= 2006 in race walking =

This page lists the World Best Year Performance in the year 2006 in both the men's and the women's race walking distances: 20 km and 50 km (outdoor). One of the main events during this season were the 2006 European Athletics Championships in Gothenburg, Sweden.

== Abbreviations ==
- All times shown are in hours:minutes:seconds

WR	world record
AR	area record
CR	event record
NR	national record
PB	personal best

== Men's 20 km ==
=== Records ===
Standing records prior to the 2006 season in track and field
World Record	Jefferson Pérez (ECU)	1:17:21	August 23, 2003	Paris, France

=== 2006 World Year Ranking ===
Rank	Time	Athlete	Venue	Date	Note
1	1:18:17	Li Gaobo (CHN)	Yangzhou, PR China	22/04/2006	
2	1:18:18	Ilya Markov (RUS)	Yangzhou, PR China	22/04/2006	
3	1:18:31	Paquillo Fernández (ESP)	A Coruña, Spain	13/05/2006	
4	1:18:35	Han Yucheng (CHN)	Yangzhou, PR China	22/04/2006	
5	1:18:44	Chu Yafei (CHN)	Yangzhou, PR China	22/04/2006	
6	1:18:45	Dong Jimin (CHN)	Yangzhou, PR China	22/04/2006	
7	1:18:57	Bai Xuejin (CHN)	Yangzhou, PR China	22/04/2006	
8	1:19:07	Nathan Deakes (AUS)	Yangzhou, PR China	22/04/2006	
9	1:19:08	Jefferson Pérez (ECU)	La Coruña, Spain	13/05/2006	
10	1:19:12	Andrei Talashka (BLR)	Nesvizh, Belarus	15/04/2006	
11	1:19:27	Viktor Burayev (RUS)	Adler, Russia	19/02/2006	
12	1:19:32	Igor Erokhin (RUS)	Adler, Russia	19/02/2006	
13	1:19:36	Hatem Ghoula (TUN)	La Coruña, Spain	13/05/2006	
14	1:19:38	Li Jianbo (CHN)	Yangzhou, PR China	22/04/2006	
14	1:19:38	Erik Tysse (NOR)	Bergen, Norway	09/06/2006	
16	1:19:51	Stepan Yudin (RUS)	Adler, Russia	19/02/2006	
17	1:19:54	Sergey Bakulin (RUS)	Adler, Russia	19/02/2006	
18	1:20:00	Valeriy Borchin (RUS)	Göteborg, Sweden	08/08/2006	
19	1:20:05	Wang Zhiping (CHN)	Xi'an, PR China	21/10/2006	
20	1:20:09	João Vieira (POR)	Göteborg, Sweden	08/08/2006	
21	1:20:11	Siarhei Charnou (BLR)	Nesvizh, Belarus	15/04/2006	
22	1:20:15	Sun Chao (CHN)	Yangzhou, PR China	22/04/2006	
23	1:20:23	Dmitriy Yesipchuk (RUS)	Adler, Russia	19/02/2006	
24	1:20:34	Mikalai Seradovich (BLR)	Nesvizh, Belarus	15/04/2006	
24	1:20:34	Andriy Yurin (UKR)	Sumy, Ukraine	02/06/2006	

== Men's 50 km ==
=== Records ===
Standing records prior to the 2006 season in track and field
World Record	Denis Nizhegorodov (RUS)	3:35:29	June 13, 2004	Cheboksary, Russia

=== 2006 World Year Ranking ===
Rank	Time	Athlete	Venue	Date	Note
1	3:35:47	Nathan Deakes (AUS)	Geelong, Australia	02/12/2006	WR
2	3:38:02	Denis Nizhegorodov (RUS)	La Coruña, Spain	14/05/2006	
3	3:41:10	Zhao Jianguo (CHN)	Wajima, Japan	16/04/2006	
4	3:41:30	Trond Nymark (NOR)	La Coruña, Spain	14/05/2006	
5	3:41:39	Yohann Diniz (FRA)	Göteborg, Sweden	10/08/2006	
6	3:42:38	Yuriy Andronov (RUS)	La Coruña, Spain	14/05/2006	
7	3:42:48	Jesús Angel García (ESP)	Göteborg, Sweden	10/08/2006	
8	3:43:02	Li Jianbo (CHN)	Wajima, Japan	16/04/2006	
9	3:43:38	Yuki Yamazaki (JPN)	Wajima, Japan	16/04/2006	
10	3:43:58	Yu Chaohong (CHN)	Xi'an, PR China	23/10/2006	
11	3:44:59	Mikel Odriozola (ESP)	La Coruña, Spain	14/05/2006	
12	3:45:47	Roman Magdziarczyk (POL)	La Coruña, Spain	14/05/2006	
13	3:45:52	Xing Shucai (CHN)	Xi'an, PR China	23/10/2006	
14	3:45:57	Vladimir Kanaykin (RUS)	Saransk, Russia	04/06/2006	
15	3:47:23	Takayuki Tanii (JPN)	Wajima, Japan	16/04/2006	
16	3:47:32	Zhao Chengliang (CHN)	Xi'an, PR China	23/10/2006	
17	3:48:08	Marco De Luca (ITA)	Göteborg, Sweden	10/08/2006	
18	3:48:22	Horacio Nava (MEX)	La Coruña, Spain	14/05/2006	
19	3:49:36	Alatan Gadasu (CHN)	Xi'an, PR China	23/10/2006	
20	3:50:24	Grzegorz Sudoł (POL)	Dudince, Slovakia	25/03/2006	
21	3:51:16	Peter Korčok (SVK)	Göteborg, Sweden	10/08/2006	
22	3:51:32	José Alejandro Cambil (ESP)	La Coruña, Spain	14/05/2006	
23	3:52:06	Si Tianfeng (CHN)	Xi'an, PR China	23/10/2006	
24	3:53:19	Duane Cousins (AUS)	Geelong, Australia	02/12/2006	
25	3:54:05	Sergey Yerokhin (RUS)	Saransk, Russia	04/06/2006	

== Women's 20 km ==
=== Records ===
Standing records prior to the 2006 season in track and field
World Record	Olimpiada Ivanova (RUS)	1:24:50	March 4, 2001	Adler, Russia

=== 2006 World Year Ranking ===
Rank	Time	Athlete	Venue	Date	Note
1	1:26:02	Olga Kaniskina (RUS)	Adler, Russia	19/02/2006	
2	1:26:11	Ryta Turava (BLR)	Nesvizh, Belarus	15/04/2006	
3	1:26:14	Irina Petrova (RUS)	Adler, Russia	19/02/2006	
4	1:26:57	Lyudmila Yefimkina (RUS)	Adler, Russia	19/02/2006	
5	1:27:26	Olimpiada Ivanova (RUS)	La Coruña, Spain	13/05/2006	
6	1:28:20	Tatyana Kozlova (RUS)	Adler, Russia	19/02/2006	
7	1:28:20	He Dan (CHN)	Yangzhou, PR China	22/04/2006	
8	1:28:23	Song Xiaoling (CHN)	Yangzhou, PR China	22/04/2006	
9	1:28:23	Kjersti Plätzer (NOR)	København, Denmark	07/10/2006	
10	1:28:26	Liu Hong (CHN)	Yangzhou, PR China	22/04/2006	
11	1:28:37	Elisa Rigaudo (ITA)	Göteborg, Sweden	09/08/2006	
12	1:28:51	Alena Zenkova-Nartova (RUS)	Adler, Russia	19/02/2006	
13	1:28:55	Jiang Jing (CHN)	Xi'an, PR China	22/10/2006	
14	1:28:58	Tatyana Sibileva (RUS)	Istanbul, Turkey	21/04/2006	
15	1:29:01	Yuliya Voyevodina (RUS)	Adler, Russia	19/02/2006	
16	1:29:05	Jane Saville (AUS)	La Coruña, Spain	13/05/2006	
17	1:29:06	Elena Ginko (BLR)	La Coruña, Spain	13/05/2006	
18	1:29:08	Jiang Qiuyan (CHN)	La Coruña, Spain	13/05/2006	
19	1:29:15	Melanie Seeger (GER)	Rio Maior, Portugal	01/04/2006	
20	1:29:27	Claudia Stef (ROM)	Göteborg, Sweden	09/08/2006	
21	1:29:31	Marina Smyslova (RUS)	Adler, Russia	19/02/2006	
22	1:29:46	Tatyana Gudkova (RUS)	Adler, Russia	19/02/2006	
23	1:29:49	Lyudmila Arkhipova (RUS)	Adler, Russia	19/02/2006	
24	1:29:50	Nie Jingjing (CHN)	Yangzhou, PR China	22/04/2006	
25	1:29:54	Sabine Krantz (GER)	La Coruña, Spain	13/05/2006	
