= 2006 IAAF World Race Walking Cup =

- Organisers: IAAF
- Edition: 22nd
- Date: 13–14 May
- Host city: A Coruña, Galicia, Spain
- Events: 5
- Participation: 58 athletes from 393 nations

he 2006 IAAF World Race Walking Cup was held on 13 and 14 May 2006 in the streets of A Coruña, Spain. Detailed reports on the event and an appraisal of the results was given for the IAAF.

Complete results were published.

== Medallists ==
Event	Gold		Silver		Bronze	
Men
Men's 20 km walk	Paquillo Fernández; Spain	1:18:31	Jefferson Pérez; Ecuador	1:19:08	Han Yucheng; China	1:19:10
Men's 50 km walk	Denis Nizhegorodov; Russia	3:38:02	Trond Nymark; Norway	3:41:30	Yuriy Andronov; Russia	3:42:38
Men's 10 km walk (junior event)	Sergey Morozov; Russia	40:26	Miguel Ángel López; Spain	41:41	Aleksey Grigoryev; Russia	41:52
Team (Men)
Team (Men 20 km)	Spain	33 pts	Australia	37 pts	Russia	37 pts
Team (Men 50 km)	Spain	20 pts	Poland	38 pts	China	39 pts
Team (Men 10 km Junior)	Russia	4 pts	Belarus	14 pts	Spain	28 pts
Women
Women's 20 km walk	Ryta Turava; BLR	1:22:20	Olimpiada Ivanova; Russia	1:22:40	Irina Petrova; Russia	1:22:40
Women's 10 km walk (junior event)	Vera Sokolova; Russia	44:49	Alexandra Kudryashova; Russia	44:52	Chai Xue; China	45:04
Team (Women)
Team (Women 20 km)	Russia	10 pts	China	19 pts	Belarus	25 pts
Team (Women 10 km Junior)	Russia	3 pts	Ukraine	11 pts	Belarus	15 pts

== Results ==
=== Men's 20 km ===
Place	Athlete	Nation	Time	Notes
1st place, gold medalist(s)	Paquillo Fernández	Spain (ESP)	1:18:31	SB
2nd place, silver medalist(s)	Jefferson Pérez	Ecuador (ECU)	1:19:08	SB
3rd place, bronze medalist(s)	Han Yucheng	China (CHN)	1:19:10	
4	Hatem Ghoula	Tunisia (TUN)	1:19:36	SB
5	Nathan Deakes	Australia (AUS)	1:19:37	
6	Sergey Bakulin	Russia (RUS)	1:20:10	
7	Viktor Burayev	Russia (RUS)	1:20:18	
8	João Vieira	Portugal (POR)	1:20:33	SB
9	Erik Tysse	Norway (NOR)	1:20:34	NR
10	Daniel García	Mexico (MEX)	1:20:52	SB
11	Siarhei Charnou	Belarus (BLR)	1:20:54	
12	Juan Manuel Molina	Spain (ESP)	1:21:09	SB
13	Wang Zhiping	China (CHN)	1:21:25	SB
14	Jared Tallent	Australia (AUS)	1:21:36	PB
15	Ivano Brugnetti	Italy (ITA)	1:31:16	SB
16	André Höhne	Germany (GER)	1:21:47	SB
17	Giorgio Rubino	Italy (ITA)	1:22:05	PB
18	Luke Adams	Australia (AUS)	1:22:11	
19	Gustavo Restrepo	Colombia (COL)	1:22:18	SB
20	Benjamin Sánchez	Spain (ESP)	1:22:24	PB
21	Mikhail Seradovich	Belarus (BLR)	1:22:26	
22	Gabriel Ortíz	Mexico (MEX)	1:22:47	
23	Kevin Eastler	United States (USA)	1:22:47	
24	Dmitriy Yesipchuk	Russia (RUS)	1:22:48	
25	Andriy Talashko	Belarus (BLR)	1:23:13	
26	Rafał Augustyn	Poland (POL)	1:23:16	
27	Lu Ronghua	China (CHN)	1:23:17	
28	José Ignacio Díaz	Spain (ESP)	1:23:19	
29	Rolando Saquipay	Ecuador (ECU)	1:23:30	
30	Takayuki Tanii	Japan (JPN)	1:23:41	
31	Koichiro Morioka	Japan (JPN)	1:24:33	
32	Lorenzo Civallero	Italy (ITA)	1:24:36	
33	Grzegorz Sudoł	Poland (POL)	1:24:50	
34	Gian Luca Trombetti	Italy (ITA)	1:24:59	
35	James Rendón	Colombia (COL)	1:25:09	
36	Franck Delree	France (FRA)	1:25:18	
37	Osvaldo Ortega	Ecuador (ECU)	1:25:24	
38	José David Domínguez	Spain (ESP)	1:25:25	
39	Theódoros Koupidis	Greece (GRE)	1:25:34	
40	Jiří Chaloupka	Czech Republic (CZE)	1:25:45	
41	Park Chil-Seong	South Korea (KOR)	1:25:54	
42	Kim Hyun-Sup	South Korea (KOR)	1:25:57	
43	Julio Rene Martínez	Guatemala (GUA)	1:25:59	
44	Diogo Martins	Portugal (POR)	1:26:12	
45	Sérgio Vieira	Portugal (POR)	1:26:22	
46	Matej Tóth	Slovakia (SVK)	1:26:30	
47	Sébastien Biche	France (FRA)	1:26:34	
48	Rustam Kuvatov	Kazakhstan (KAZ)	1:26:43	
49	Peter Korčok	Slovakia (SVK)	1:26:43	
50	Adam Rutter	Australia (AUS)	1:26:54	
51	Duane Cousins	Australia (AUS)	1:27:08	
52	Ruslan Dmytrenko	Ukraine (UKR)	1:27:16	
53	Jan Albrecht	Germany (GER)	1:27:35	
54	Recep Celik	Turkey (TUR)	1:27:36	
55	Vilius Mikelionis	Lithuania (LTU)	1:27:37	
56	Andriy Kovenko	Ukraine (UKR)	1:27:46	
57	Hassanine Sbai	Tunisia (TUN)	1:27:49	
58	Allan Segura	Costa Rica (CRC)	1:27:53	
59	Xavier Moreno	Ecuador (ECU)	1:27:57	
60	Tadas Šuškevičius	Lithuania (LTU)	1:28:05	
61	Luis García	Guatemala (GUA)	1:28:45	
62	Eric Guevara	Mexico (MEX)	1:29:02	
63	Sin Il-Yong	South Korea (KOR)	1:29:13	
64	Viktor Ginko	Belarus (BLR)	1:29:28	
65	Akihiro Sugimoto	Japan (JPN)	1:29:35	
66	Walter Sandoval	El Salvador (ESA)	1:29:40	
67	Aleksandr Venglovskyy	Ukraine (UKR)	1:29:44	
68	Marc Mundell	South Africa (RSA)	1:30:04	
69	Tim Seaman	United States (USA)	1:31:01	
70	Miloš Holuša	Czech Republic (CZE)	1:31:03	
71	John Nunn	United States (USA)	1:31:49	
72	Hervé Davaux	France (FRA)	1:31:52	
73	Ben Shorey	United States (USA)	1:32:20	
74	Matthew Boyles	United States (USA)	1:32:29	
75	Marius Žiūkas	Lithuania (LTU)	1:32:34	
76	Fredy Hernández	Colombia (COL)	1:32:38	
77	Jean Michel Prevel	France (FRA)	1:32:41	
78	Ashenafi Merecho	Ethiopia (ETH)	1:33:42	
79	Levente Kapéri	Hungary (HUN)	1:33:53	
80	Mohd Shahrul Haizy	Malaysia (MAS)	1:34:27	
81	Ivan Losev	Ukraine (UKR)	1:34:37	
82	Nicolas Perrier	Switzerland (SUI)	1:36:12	
83	Jakub Jelonek	Poland (POL)	1:36:27	
84	Aléxandros Spiliópoulos	Greece (GRE)	1:37:53	
85	Artyom Valchenko	Ukraine (UKR)	1:37:59	
86	Loo Choon Sieng	Malaysia (MAS)	1:38:04	
87	Margus Luik	Estonia (EST)	1:38:30	
88	José Atiles	Puerto Rico (PUR)	1:38:37	
89	Lauri Lelumees	Estonia (EST)	1:39:42	
90	Gabriel Ngnintedem	Cameroon (CMR)	1:40:36	
91	Harold van Beek	Netherlands (NED)	1:42:33	
92	Fraulin Caminero	Dominican Republic (DOM)	1:46:24	
93	Jérome Caprice	Mauritius (MRI)	1:47:40	
94	Yann Banderet	Switzerland (SUI)	1:47:43	
95	Thierry Giroud	Switzerland (SUI)	1:50:07	
—	Cui Zhide	China (CHN)	DQ	
—	Zhu Hongjun	China (CHN)	DQ	
—	Luis Fernando López	Colombia (COL)	DQ	
—	Andrés Chocho	Ecuador (ECU)	DQ	
—	Colin Griffin	Ireland (IRL)	DQ	
—	Cristian Berdeja	Mexico (MEX)	DQ	
—	Wayne Snyman	South Africa (RSA)	DQ	
—	Igor Yerokhin	Russia (RUS)	DQ	
—	Pierre-Luc Ménard	Canada (CAN)	DNF	
—	Denis Langlois	France (FRA)	DNF	
—	Michael Krause	Germany (GER)	DNF	
—	Jamie Costin	Ireland (IRL)	DNF	
—	Alessandro Gandellini	Italy (ITA)	DNF	
—	Eder Sánchez	Mexico (MEX)	DNF	
—	Arnaud Woo Kai Song	Mauritius (MRI)	DNF	
—	Rafał Dys	Poland (POL)	DNF	
—	Ezequiel Nazario	Puerto Rico (PUR)	DNF	
—	Waleed Al-Sabahi	Qatar (QAT)	DNF	
—	Stepan Yudin	Russia (RUS)	DNF	
—	Anatole Ibáñez	Sweden (SWE)	DNF	

==== Team (20 km Men) ====
Place	Country	Points
1st place, gold medalist(s)	Spain	33 pts
2nd place, silver medalist(s)	Australia	37 pts
3rd place, bronze medalist(s)	Russia	37 pts
4	China	43 pts
5	Belarus	57 pts
6	Italy	64 pts
7	Ecuador	68 pts
8	Mexico	94 pts
9	Portugal	97 pts
10	Japan	126 pts
11	Colombia	130 pts
12	Poland	142 pts
13	South Korea	146 pts
14	France	155 pts
15	United States	163 pts
16	Ukraine	175 pts
17	Lithuania	190 pts
18	Switzerland	271 pts

=== Men's 50 km ===
Place	Athlete	Nation	Time	Notes
1st place, gold medalist(s)	Denis Nizhegorodov	Russia (RUS)	3:38:02	CR
2nd place, silver medalist(s)	Trond Nymark	Norway (NOR)	3:41:30	NR
3rd place, bronze medalist(s)	Yuriy Andronov	Russia (RUS)	3:42:38	SB
4	Mikel Odriozola	Spain (ESP)	3:44:59	SB
5	Roman Magdziarczyk	Poland (POL)	3:45:47	SB
6	Jesús Angel García	Spain (ESP)	3:46:11	SB
7	Horacio Nava	Mexico (MEX)	3:48:22	PB
8	Zhao Chengliang	China (CHN)	3:49:29	SB
9	Marco De Luca	Italy (ITA)	3:49:43	PB
10	José Alejandro Cambil	Spain (ESP)	3:51:32	PB
11	Yu Chaohong	China (CHN)	3:52:12	SB
12	Claudio Erasmo Vargas	Mexico (MEX)	3:54:16	SB
13	Andrei Stepanchuk	Belarus (BLR)	3:54:31	SB
14	Kamil Kalka	Poland (POL)	3:54:44	PB
15	Diego Cafagna	Italy (ITA)	3:55:41	SB
16	Eddy Riva	France (FRA)	3:55:55	SB
17	David Boulanger	France (FRA)	3:56:46	SB
18	Ingus Janevics	Latvia (LAT)	3:56:54	PB
19	Rafal Fedaczynski	Poland (POL)	3:57:24	SB
20	Si Tianfeng	China (CHN)	3:57:54	SB
21	Pedro Martins	Portugal (POR)	3:58:10	
22	António Pereira	Portugal (POR)	3:58:39	
23	Fredrik Svensson	Sweden (SWE)	3:58:46	
25	Michał Jarosz	Poland (POL)	3:59:19	
26	Chris Erickson	Australia (AUS)	3:59:20	
27	Jorge Costa	Portugal (POR)	3:59:27	
28	Dionisio Ventura	Portugal (POR)	3:59:28	
29	Jarkko Kinnunen	Finland (FIN)	3:59:39	
30	Aleksandar Raković	Serbia and Montenegro (SCG)	4:01:59	
31	Augusto Cardoso	Portugal (POR)	4:03:16	
32	Bengt Bengtsson	Sweden (SWE)	4:04:45	
33	Xing Shucai	China (CHN)	4:05:41	
34	Kim Dong-Yeong	South Korea (KOR)	4:07:59	
35	Donatas Škarnulis	Lithuania (LTU)	4:09:31	
36	Gyula Dudás	Hungary (HUN)	4:11:53	
37	Gadasu Alatan	China (CHN)	4:12:04	
38	Igors Kazakēvičs	Latvia (LAT)	4:12:06	
39	Tim Berrett	Canada (CAN)	4:12:37	
40	Salvador Mira	El Salvador (ESA)	4:12:53	
41	Zoltán Czukor	Hungary (HUN)	4:15:50	
42	Philip Dunn	United States (USA)	4:16:06	
43	Timo Viljanen	Finland (FIN)	4:16:24	
44	Jorge Ignacio Silva	Spain (ESP)	4:16:34	
45	Mirko Dolci	Italy (ITA)	4:16:48	
46	Craig Barrett	New Zealand (NZL)	4:19:21	
47	Edwin Centeno	Peru (PER)	4:20:22	
48	Aleksey Shelest	Ukraine (UKR)	4:21:33	
49	Sergey Kirdyapkin	Russia (RUS)	4:23:27	
50	Yuriy Burban	Ukraine (UKR)	4:26:35	
51	Cristián Bascuñán	Chile (CHI)	4:26:55	
52	Christer Svensson	Sweden (SWE)	4:27:28	
53	Alessandro Garozzo	Italy (ITA)	4:27:44	
54	Ray Sharp	United States (USA)	4:30:46	
55	Theron Kissinger	United States (USA)	4:31:20	
56	Aleksandr Romanenko	Ukraine (UKR)	4:32:43	
57	Róbert Tubak	Hungary (HUN)	4:33:17	
58	Urbain Girod	Switzerland (SUI)	4:36:52	
59	Mark Green	United States (USA)	4:37:38	
60	Bruno Grandjean	Switzerland (SUI)	4:40:01	
61	Bernardo Calvo	Costa Rica (CRC)	4:56:19	
62	Degife Debeko	Ethiopia (ETH)	4:58:54	
63	Daniel Foudjem	Cameroon (CMR)	5:05:51	
—	Troy Sundstrom	Australia (AUS)	DQ	
—	Mario Avellaneda	Spain (ESP)	DQ	
—	László Novák	Hungary (HUN)	DQ	
—	Darius Škarnulis	Lithuania (LTU)	DQ	
—	Omar Zepeda	Mexico (MEX)	DQ	
—	Vladimir Kanaykin	Russia (RUS)	DQ	
—	Darren Bown	Australia (AUS)	DNF	
—	Sergio Galdino	Brazil (BRA)	DNF	
—	Cédric Houssaye	France (FRA)	DNF	
—	Fabrice Ramon	France (FRA)	DNF	
—	Eddy Roze	France (FRA)	DNF	
—	Konstadínos Stefanópoulos	Greece (GRE)	DNF	
—	Dario Privitera	Italy (ITA)	DNF	
—	Álvaro García	Mexico (MEX)	DNF	
—	Juan Emilio Toscano	Mexico (MEX)	DNF	
—	José Ramírez	Puerto Rico (PUR)	DNF	
—	Aleksey Voyevodin	Russia (RUS)	DNF	
—	Aleksey Kazanin	Ukraine (UKR)	DNF	
—	Dave McGovern	United States (USA)	DNF	

==== Team (50 km Men) ====
Place	Country	Points
1st place, gold medalist(s)	Spain	20 pts
2nd place, silver medalist(s)	Poland	38 pts
3rd place, bronze medalist(s)	China	39 pts
4	Russia	53 pts
5	Italy	69 pts
6	Portugal	70 pts
7	Latvia	80 pts
8	Sweden	107 pts
9	Hungary	134 pts
10	United States	151 pts
11	Ukraine	154 pts

=== Men's 10 km (Junior) ===
Place	Athlete	Nation	Time	Notes
1st place, gold medalist(s)	Sergey Morozov	Russia (RUS)	40:26	
2nd place, silver medalist(s)	Miguel Ángel López	Spain (ESP)	41:41	
3rd place, bronze medalist(s)	Aleksey Grigoryev	Russia (RUS)	41:52	
4	José Javier Sánchez	Mexico (MEX)	41:57	
5	Mauricio Arteaga	Ecuador (ECU)	42:42	
6	Dmitry Gamzunov	Belarus (BLR)	42:49	
7	Dmitry Shorin	Russia (RUS)	43:05	
8	Dzianis Kravchuk	Belarus (BLR)	43:23	
9	Juan Manuel Cano	Argentina (ARG)	43:25	
10	Aléxandros Papamihaíl	Greece (GRE)	43:31	
11	Nicholas Ball	Great Britain (GBR)	43:36	
12	Matteo Giupponi	Italy (ITA)	43:55	
13	Rafał Sikora	Poland (POL)	44:01	
14	Heikki Kukkonen	Finland (FIN)	44:01	
15	Abdurrahim Celik	Turkey (TUR)	44:04	
16	Arnis Rumbenieks	Latvia (LAT)	44:05	
17	Stefano Cattaneo	Italy (ITA)	44:12	
18	Tautvydas Žėkas	Lithuania (LTU)	44:15	
19	Maik Schneider	Germany (GER)	44:19	
20	Yaroslav Borodinov	Ukraine (UKR)	44:25	
21	Tibor Márta	Hungary (HUN)	44:25	
22	Balázs Darabos	Hungary (HUN)	44:26	
23	Kevin Campion	France (FRA)	44:59	
24	Ivan Almashii	Ukraine (UKR)	45:01	
25	Federico Tontodonati	Italy (ITA)	45:08	
26	Abdelilah Jaadar	Spain (ESP)	45:09	
27	Francisco Ruíz	Spain (ESP)	45:13	
28	Benjamin Schmitt	France (FRA)	45:17	
29	Lim Jung-Hyun	South Korea (KOR)	45:20	
30	Maciej Kubiak	Poland (POL)	45:28	
31	José Luis Muñoz	Ecuador (ECU)	45:30	
32	Werner Appel	South Africa (RSA)	45:34	
33	Vasilios Hrisikós	Greece (GRE)	45:58	
34	Ayele Hitsan	Ethiopia (ETH)	46:00	
35	Michael Doyle	Ireland (IRL)	46:06	
36	Ricard Rekst	Lithuania (LTU)	46:07	
37	Vladyslav Svidnytsky	Ukraine (UKR)	46:12	
38	Robinson Vivar	Ecuador (ECU)	46:25	
39	Martins Pastars	Latvia (LAT)	46:36	
40	Hugo López	Guatemala (GUA)	46:40	
41	Alfonso Bran	Guatemala (GUA)	47:02	
42	Daniel Coleman	Australia (AUS)	47:02	
43	Ben Wears	Great Britain (GBR)	47:07	
44	Olivier Colette	Belgium (BEL)	47:15	
45	Jonathan Latouche	France (FRA)	47:16	
46	Balázs Havasi	Hungary (HUN)	47:39	
47	Brook Keys	Australia (AUS)	47:57	
48	Christopher Bürki	Switzerland (SUI)	48:21	
49	Risko Nogelainen	Estonia (EST)	48:48	
50	Roberto Vergara	United States (USA)	49:15	
51	Michael Kazmierczak	United States (USA)	49:45	
52	Andreas Nielsen	Denmark (DEN)	50:14	
53	Ricardo Vergara	United States (USA)	50:15	
54	Artjom Djatsuk	Estonia (EST)	55:22	
—	Ian Rayson	Australia (AUS)	DQ	
—	Li Gaobo	China (CHN)	DQ	
—	Shi Yong	China (CHN)	DQ	
—	Rafael Avendaño	Mexico (MEX)	DQ	
—	Jibreel Rahmat Khan	Qatar (QAT)	DQ	
—	Recep Sariaslan	Turkey (TUR)	DQ	

==== Team (10 km Men Junior) ====
Place	Country	Points
1st place, gold medalist(s)	Russia	4 pts
2nd place, silver medalist(s)	Belarus	14 pts
3rd place, bronze medalist(s)	Spain	28 pts
4	Italy	29 pts
5	Ecuador	36 pts
6	Hungary	43 pts
7	Poland	43 pts
8	Greece	43 pts
9	Ukraine	44 pts
10	France	51 pts
11	Lithuania	54 pts
12	United Kingdom	54 pts
13	Latvia	55 pts
14	Guatemala	81 pts
15	Australia	89 pts
16	United States	101 pts
17	Estonia	103 pts

=== Women's 20 km ===
Place	Athlete	Nation	Time	Notes
1st place, gold medalist(s)	Ryta Turava	Belarus (BLR)	1:26:27	CR
2nd place, silver medalist(s)	Olimpiada Ivanova	Russia (RUS)	1:27:26	SB
3rd place, bronze medalist(s)	Irina Petrova	Russia (RUS)	1:27:46	
4	He Dan	China (CHN)	1:28:52	
5	Olga Kaniskina	Russia (RUS)	1:28:59	
6	Liu Hong	China (CHN)	1:28:59	
7	Jane Saville	Australia (AUS)	1:29:05	SB
8	Elena Ginko	Belarus (BLR)	1:29:06	SB
9	Jiang Qiuyan	China (CHN)	1:29:08	SB
10	Elisa Rigaudo	Italy (ITA)	1:29:37	SB
11	Claudia Stef	Romania (ROM)	1:29:46	SB
12	Sabine Zimmer	Germany (GER)	1:29:54	SB
13	Inês Henriques	Portugal (POR)	1:30:28	PB
14	Ana Cabecinha	Portugal (POR)	1:31:02	PB
15	Sylwia Korzeniowska	Poland (POL)	1:31:16	NR
16	Tatsiana Metleuskaya	Belarus (BLR)	1:31:35	
17	Jolanta Dukure	Latvia (LAT)	1:32:01	SB
18	María José Poves	Spain (ESP)	1:32:05	SB
19	Kristina Saltanovic	Lithuania (LTU)	1:32:08	
20	Ana Maria Groza	Romania (ROM)	1:32:29	
21	Melanie Seeger	Germany (GER)	1:32:36	
22	Snezhana Yurchenko	Belarus (BLR)	1:32:42	
23	Bai Yanmin	China (CHN)	1:32:56	
24	Norica Cîmpean	Romania (ROU)	1:33:03	
25	Sonata Milušauskaitė	Lithuania (LTU)	1:33:04	
26	Miriam Ramón	Ecuador (ECU)	1:33:24	
27	Vera Santos	Portugal (POR)	1:33:54	
28	Natalie Saville	Australia (AUS)	1:34:51	
29	Ann Loughnane	Ireland (IRL)	1:34:59	
30	Vira Zozulya	Ukraine (UKR)	1:35:33	
31	Cristina López	El Salvador (ESA)	1:35:36	
32	Teresa Vaill	United States (USA)	1:35:46	
33	Sandra Zapata	Colombia (COL)	1:36:06	
34	Joanne Dow	United States (USA)	1:36:14	
35	Gisella Orsini	Italy (ITA)	1:36:21	
36	Yadira Guamán	Ecuador (ECU)	1:36:22	
37	Cheryl Webb	Australia (AUS)	1:36:33	
38	Kellie Wapshott	Australia (AUS)	1:36:49	
39	Zuzana Malíková	Slovakia (SVK)	1:36:51	
40	Veronica Budileanu	Romania (ROU)	1:37:00	
41	Marie Polli	Switzerland (SUI)	1:37:04	
42	Lisa Grant	Australia (AUS)	1:37:40	
43	Nadiya Prokopuk	Ukraine (UKR)	1:37:47	
44	Fabiola Godinez	Mexico (MEX)	1:38:05	
45	Evelyn Núñez	Guatemala (GUA)	1:38:10	
46	María Isabel Pérez	Spain (ESP)	1:38:59	
48	Yelena Miroshnychenko	Ukraine (UKR)	1:39:30	
49	Jolene Moore	United States (USA)	1:40:08	
50	Laura Polli	Switzerland (SUI)	1:41:02	
51	Brigita Virbalytė	Lithuania (LTU)	1:41:28	
52	Mayumi Kawasaki	Japan (JPN)	1:41:41	
53	Annarita Fidanza	Italy (ITA)	1:41:46	
54	Jo Jackson	Great Britain (GBR)	1:41:47	
55	Christine Guinaudeau	France (FRA)	1:41:47	
56	Verónica Colindres	El Salvador (ESA)	1:42:37	
57	Andrea Kovács	Hungary (HUN)	1:42:50	
58	Aida Andrade	Ecuador (ECU)	1:42:52	
59	Lucie Pelantová	Czech Republic (CZE)	1:43:14	
60	Nicolene Cronje	South Africa (RSA)	1:43:23	
61	Tatiana Orellana	Ecuador (ECU)	1:43:48	
62	Ruslana Voropay	Ukraine (UKR)	1:45:39	
63	Susanne Erasmus	South Africa (RSA)	1:46:38	
64	Nagwa Ibrahim	Egypt (EGY)	1:46:42	
65	Deb Huberty	United States (USA)	1:49:23	
66	Rachel Lavallée	Canada (CAN)	1:49:53	
67	Fatma Ormeci	Turkey (TUR)	1:50:54	
68	Viktória Madarász	Hungary (HUN)	1:50:56	
69	Geetha Nandani	Sri Lanka (SRI)	1:51:53	
70	Dóra Nemere	Hungary (HUN)	1:57:38	
71	Marie Yolene Raffin	Mauritius (MRI)	1:57:44	
—	Shi Na	China (CHN)	DQ	
—	Ildikó Ilyés	Hungary (HUN)	DQ	
—	Tatyana Kozlova	Russia (RUS)	DQ	
—	Mária Gáliková	Slovakia (SVK)	DQ	
—	Mercedes Quezada	Dominican Republic (DOM)	DNF	
—	Mayte Gargallo	Spain (ESP)	DNF	
—	Katie Stones	Great Britain (GBR)	DNF	
—	María Chatzipanayiotidou	Greece (GRE)	DNF	
—	Alexía Triadafíllou	Greece (GRE)	DNF	
—	Déspina Zapounídou	Greece (GRE)	DNF	
—	Martina Gabrielli	Italy (ITA)	DNF	
—	Svetlana Tolstaya	Kazakhstan (KAZ)	DNF	
—	Neringa Aidietytė	Lithuania (LTU)	DNF	
—	Susana Feitór	Portugal (POR)	DNF	
—	Lyudmila Yefimkina	Russia (RUS)	DNF	
—	Monica Svensson	Sweden (SWE)	DNF	
—	Amber Antonia	United States (USA)	DNF	

==== Team (20km Women) ====
Place	Country	Points
1st place, gold medalist(s)	Russia	10 pts
2nd place, silver medalist(s)	China	19 pts
3rd place, bronze medalist(s)	Belarus	25 pts
4	Portugal	54 pts
5	Romania	55 pts
6	Australia	72 pts
7	Lithuania	95 pts
8	Italy	98 pts
9	United States	115 pts
10	Ukraine	120 pts
11	Ecuador	120 pts
12	Hungary	195 pts

=== Women's 10 km Junior ===
Place	Athlete	Nation	Time	Notes
1st place, gold medalist(s)	Vera Sokolova	Russia (RUS)	44:49	
2nd place, silver medalist(s)	Alexandra Kudryashova	Russia (RUS)	44:52	
3rd place, bronze medalist(s)	Chai Xue	China (CHN)	45:04	
4	Volha Mazuronak	Belarus (BLR)	47:40	
5	Svitlana Vavilova	Ukraine (UKR)	48:22	
6	Yuliya Davydenko	Ukraine (UKR)	48:40	
7	Anna Mielcarek	Poland (POL)	48:49	
8	Federica Ferraro	Italy (ITA)	49:01	
9	Katarzyna Golba	Poland (POL)	49:25	
10	Lorena Castrillo	Spain (ESP)	49:33	
11	Anna Drabenya	Belarus (BLR)	49:43	
12	Ingrid Hernández	Colombia (COL)	49:50	
13	Anlly Pineda	Colombia (COL)	49:53	
14	Klara Malíková	Slovakia (SVK)	50:12	
15	Catarina Godinho	Portugal (POR)	50:16	
16	Karoliina Kaasalainen	Finland (FIN)	50:22	
17	Claudia Cornejo	Bolivia (BOL)	50:26	
18	Maria Czaková	Slovakia (SVK)	50:32	
19	Narim Kahraman	Turkey (TUR)	50:37	
20	Fiona Alldis	Australia (AUS)	50:39	
21	Uliana Verkhola	Ukraine (UKR)	50:53	
22	Asnakch Ararissa	Ethiopia (ETH)	51:12	
23	Marta Santoro	Italy (ITA)	51:15	
24	Heather Buletti	United States (USA)	51:25	
25	Maria Rayo	Colombia (COL)	51:43	
26	Raquel González	Spain (ESP)	51:50	
27	Marcia Silva	Portugal (POR)	52:01	
28	Federica Barletta	Italy (ITA)	52:26	
29	Spyridoula Stavrou	Greece (GRE)	52:36	
30	Eugenia Gandoy	Spain (ESP)	52:41	
31	Marandeliz Arroyo	Puerto Rico (PUR)	52:45	
32	Catherine Hayes	United States (USA)	52:54	
33	Eszter Bajnai	Hungary (HUN)	53:05	
34	Mia Hovi	Finland (FIN)	53:08	
35	Ivett Erdös	Hungary (HUN)	53:10	
36	Heidi Bouchery	France (FRA)	53:38	
37	Laura Reynolds	Ireland (IRL)	53:52	
38	Cecilia Kardos	Hungary (HUN)	55:12	
39	Sarah Foster	Great Britain (GBR)	55:42	
40	Semra Yilmaz	Turkey (TUR)	56:23	
41	Leʼerin Voss	United States (USA)	58:06	
42	Ragle Raudsepp	Estonia (EST)	58:24	
43	Svetlana Gribkova	Estonia (EST)	59:53	
44	Evelin Tomingas	Estonia (EST)	69:44	
—	Tanya Holliday	Australia (AUS)	DQ	
—	Susan Knapton	Australia (AUS)	DQ	
—	Rebecca Mersh	Great Britain (GBR)	DQ	
—	Yelena Ladanova	Russia (RUS)	DQ	

==== Team (10km Women Junior) ====
Place	Country	Points
1st place, gold medalist(s)	Russia	3 pts
2nd place, silver medalist(s)	Ukraine	11 pts
3rd place, bronze medalist(s)	Belarus	15 pts
4	Poland	16 pts
5	Colombia	25 pts
6	Italy	31 pts
7	Slovakia	32 pts
8	Spain	36 pts
9	Portugal	42 pts
10	Finland	50 pts
11	United States	56 pts
12	Turkey	59 pts
13	Hungary	68 pts
14	Estonia	85 pts

== Participation ==
The participation of 393 athletes (257 men/136 women) from 58 countries is reported.

- Argentina (1/-)
- Australia (11/8)
- Belarus (7/6)
- Belgium (1/-)
- Bolivia (-/1)
- Brazil (1/-)
- Cameroon (2/-)
- Canada (2/1)
- Chile (1/-)
- China (12/6)
- Colombia (4/4)
- Costa Rica (2/-)
- Czech Republic (2/1)
- Denmark (1/-)
- Dominican Republic (1/1)
- Ecuador (8/4)
- Egypt (-/1)
- El Salvador (2/2)
- Estonia (4/3)
- Ethiopia (3/1)
- Finland (3/2)
- France (13/2)
- Germany (4/2)
- Greece (5/4)
- Guatemala (4/1)
- Hungary (8/7)
- Ireland (3/2)
- Italy (13/7)
- Japan (3/1)
- Kazakhstan (1/1)
- Latvia (4/1)
- Lithuania (7/4)
- Malaysia (2/-)
- Mauritius (2/1)
- Mexico (12/1)
- Netherlands (1/-)
- New Zealand (1/-)
- Norway (2/-)
- Peru (1/-)
- Poland (10/3)
- Portugal (8/6)
- Puerto Rico (3/1)
- Qatar (2/-)
- Romania (-/4)
- Russia (13/8)
- Serbia and Montenegro (1/-)
- Slovakia (2/4)
- South Africa (3/2)
- South Korea (5/-)
- Spain (13/6)
- Sri Lanka (-/1)
- Sweden (4/1)
- Switzerland (6/2)
- Tunisia (2/-)
- Turkey (3/3)
- Ukraine (12/7)
- United Kingdom (2/4)
- United States (13/8)

== See also ==
- 2006 Race Walking Year Ranking
