= 20 kilometres race walk =

Olympic athletics event

Athletics 20 kilometre race walk
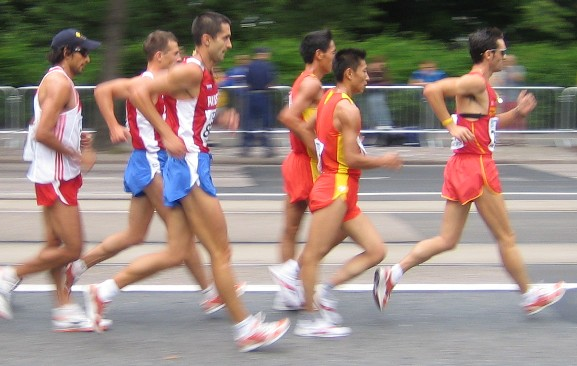
- The men's 20 km race walk at the 2005 World Championships in Athletics

World records
- Men: (Japan) Toshikazu Yamanishi 1:16:10 (2025)
- Women: (China) Yang Jiayu 1:23:49 (2021)

Olympic records
- Men: (China) Chen Ding 1:18:46 (2012)
- Women: (China) Qieyang Shenjie 1:25:16 (2012)

The 20 kilometre race walk is an Olympic athletics event that is competed by both men and women. The racewalking event is competed as a road race. Athletes must always keep in contact with the ground and the supporting leg must remain straight until the raised leg passes it.

== World records ==
The men's world record for the 20 km race walk is held by Toshikazu Yamanishi, who walked 1:16:10 at the 2025 Japanese Race Walking Championships in Kobe, Japan. The women's world record of 1:23:49 was set by Yang Jiayu of China in 2021. Russian Elena Lashmanova, has served a previous ban for doping, currently holds a quicker time of 1:23:39 which is also the European record, but it has never been ratified as a world record.

== Area records ==
- Updated 21 May 2026.

Area	Men			Women		
Area	Time	Season	Athlete	Time	Season	Athlete
World	1:16:10	2025	Toshikazu Yamanishi (JPN)	1:23:49	2021	Yang Jiayu (CHN)
Area records
Africa (records)	1:18:23	2021	Samuel Gathimba (KEN)	1:30:40	2018	Grace Wanjiru (KEN)
Asia (records)	1:16:10	2025	Toshikazu Yamanishi (JPN)	1:23:49	2021	Yang Jiayu (CHN)
Europe (records)	1:17:02	2015	Yohann Diniz (FRA)	1:25:08	2011	Vera Sokolova (RUS)
North, Central America and Caribbean (records)	1:17:39	2025	Evan Dunfee (CAN)	1:26:06	2025	Alegna González (MEX)
Oceania (records)	1:17:33	2005	Nathan Deakes (AUS)	1:26:25	2024	Jemima Montag (AUS)
South America (records)	1:17:21	2003	Jefferson Pérez (ECU)	1:25:29	2019	Glenda Morejón (ECU)

== All-time top 25 ==
Tables show data for two definitions of "Top 25" - the top 25 20 km walk times and the top 25 athletes:
- denotes top performance for athletes in the top 25 20 km walk times
- denotes lesser performances, still in the top 25 20 km walk times, by repeat athletes
- denotes top performance (only) for other top 25 athletes who fall outside the top 25 20 km walk times

=== Men ===
- Correct as of February 2025.

Ath.#	Perf.#	Time	Athlete	Nation	Date	Place	Ref.
1	1	1:16:10	Toshikazu Yamanishi	Japan	16 February 2025	Kobe	
2	2	1:16:36	Yusuke Suzuki	Japan	15 March 2015	Nomi	
3	3	1:16:43	Sergey Morozov	Russia	8 June 2008	Saransk	
4	4	1:16:51	Koki Ikeda	Japan	18 February 2024	Kobe	
5	5	1:16:54	Kaihua Wang	China	20 March 2021	Huangshan	
6	6	1:17:02	Yohann Diniz	France	8 March 2015	Arles	
	7	1:17:15	Yamanishi #2		17 March 2019	Nomi	
7	8	1:17:16	Vladimir Kanaykin	Russia	29 September 2007	Saransk	
	9	1:17:20	Yamanishi #3		21 February 2021	Kobe	
8	10	1:17:21	Jefferson Pérez	Ecuador	22 August 2003	Saint-Denis	
9	11	1:17:22	Francisco Javier Fernandez	Spain	28 April 2002	Turku	
10	12	1:17:23	Vladimir Stankin	Russia	28 February 2004	Adler, Sochi	
	13	1:17:24	Diniz #2		15 March 2015	Lugano	
11	13	1:17:24	Masatora Kawano	Japan	17 March 2019	Nomi	
12	13	1:17:24	Satoshi Maruo	Japan	16 February 2025	Kobe	
13	16	1:17:25	Sergey Shirobokov	Russia	9 June 2018	Cheboksary	
	15	1:17:25	Ikeda #2		17 March 2019	Nomi	
14	18	1:17:26	Eiki Takahashi	Japan	18 February 2018	Kobe	
14	18	1:17:26	Massimo Stano	Italy	3 March 2024	Taicang	
14	18	1:17:26	Jun Zhang	China	3 March 2024	Taicang	
17	21	1:17:32	Álvaro Martín	Spain	19 August 2023	Budapest	
18	22	1:17:33	Nathan Deakes	Australia	23 April 2005	Cixi City	
	23	1:17:36	Kanaykin #2		17 June 2007	Cheboksary	
19	24	1:17:36	Zhen Wang	China	30 March 2012	Taicang	
	24	1:17:36	Yamanishi #4		18 February 2018	Kobe	
20		1:17:37	Caio Bonfim	Brazil	16 February 2025	Kobe	
21		1:17:38	Valeriy Borchin	Russia	28 February 2009	Adler, Sochi	
22		1:17:38	Kento Yoshikawa	Japan	16 February 2025	Kobe	
23		1:17:39	Zelin Cai	China	20 March 2021	Huangshan	
24		1:17:39	Perseus Karlström	Sweden	19 August 2023	Budapest	
25		1:17:40	Ding Chen	China	30 March 2012	Taicang	

=== Women ===
- Correct as of September 2025.

Ath.#	Perf.#	Time	Athlete	Nation	Date	Place	Ref.
1	1	1:23:39	Yelena Lashmanova	Russia	9 June 2018	Cheboksary	
2	2	1:23:49	Yang Jiayu	China	20 March 2021	Huangshan	
3	3	1:24:27	Hong Liu	China	20 March 2021	Huangshan	
	4	1:24:31	Lashmanova #2		18 February 2019	Sochi	
	5	1:24:38	Liu #2		6 June 2015	La Coruna	
4	6	1:24:45	Shijie Qieyang	China	20 March 2021	Huangshan	
5	7	1:24:47	Elmira Alembekova	Russia	27 February 2015	Sochi	
6	8	1:24:50	Olimpiada Ivanova	Russia	4 March 2001	Adler, Sochi	
7	9	1:24:56	Olga Kaniskina	Russia	28 February 2009	Adler, Sochi	
	10	1:24:58	Lashmanova #3		25 June 2016	Cheboksary	
8	11	1:25:03	Marina Novikova	Russia	27 February 2015	Sochi	
9	12	1:25:04	Svetlana Vasilyeva	Russia	27 February 2015	Sochi	
10	13	1:25:08	Vera Sokolova	Russia	26 February 2011	Sochi	
	14	1:25:11	Kaniskina #2		23 February 2008	Adler, Sochi	
11	14	1:25:11	Anisiya Kornikova-Kirdyapkina	Russia	20 February 2010	Sochi	
12	16	1:25:12	Xiuzhi Lyu	China	20 March 2015	Beijing	
	17	1:25:16	Qieyang #2		11 August 2012	London	
13	18	1:25:18	Tatyana Gudkova	Russia	19 May 2000	Moscow	
	18	1:25:18	Lashmanova #4		18 February 2017	Sochi	
14	20	1:25:20	Olga Polyakova	Russia	19 May 2000	Moscow	
15	21	1:25:22	Yekaterina Medvedeva	Russia	18 February 2017	Sochi	
	22	1:25:26	Sokolova #2		28 February 2009	Adler, Sochi	
	22	1:25:26	Kornikova-Kirdyapkina #2		28 February 2009	Adler, Sochi	
	24	1:25:27	Alembekova #2		18 February 2012	Sochi	
16	25	1:25:29	Irina Stankina	Russia	19 May 2000	Moscow	
16	25	1:25:29	Glenda Morejón	Ecuador	8 June 2019	La Coruna	
18		1:25:30	María Pérez	Spain	26 March 2023	Córdoba	
19		1:25:32	Yelena Shumkina	Russia	28 February 2009	Adler, Sochi	
20		1:25:46	Tatyana Shemyakina	Russia	23 February 2008	Adler, Sochi	
21		1:25:52	Larisa Yemelyanova	Russia	28 February 2009	Adler, Sochi	
21		1:25:52	Tatyana Sibileva	Russia	20 February 2010	Sochi	
23		1:25:59	Tamara Kovalenko	Russia	19 May 2000	Moscow	
23		1:25:59	Liujing Yang	China	20 March 2021	Huangshan	
25		1:26:06	Alegna González	Mexico	20 September 2025	Tokyo	

==== Notes ====
Below is a list of other times equal or superior to 1:26:06:

- Anisiya Kornikova-Kirdyapkina also walked 1:25:30 (2008) and 1:25:59 (2013).
- Yang Jiayu also walked 1:25:34 (2019) and 1:25:54 (2024).
- Vera Sokolova also walked 1:25:35 (2010), 1:25:38 (2015) and 1:26:00 (2013).
- Shenjie Qieyang also walked 1:25:37 (2019).
- Olimpiada Ivanova also walked 1:25:41 (2005).
- Yelena Lashmanova also walked 1:25:41 (2021) and 1:25:49 (2013).
- Olga Kaniskina also walked 1:25:42 (2008), 1:25:54 (2016) and 1:26:02 (2006).
- Liu Hong also walked 1:25:46 (2012), 1:25:56 (2016, 2019) and 1:26:00 (2012).
- Lü Xiuzhi also walked 1:25:51 (2021).

The following athletes have had their performances (inside 1:26:06) annulled due to doping offence:

Time	Athlete	Nation	Date	Place	Ref.
1:25:09	Olga Kaniskina	Russia	11 August 2012	London	
1:25:59	Liu Hong	China	7 May 2016	Rome	

== Olympic medalists ==
=== Men ===
Games	Gold	Silver	Bronze
1956 Melbourne	Leonid Spirin; Soviet Union	Antanas Mikėnas; Soviet Union	Bruno Junk; Soviet Union
1960 Rome	Volodymyr Holubnychy; Soviet Union	Noel Freeman; Australia	Stan Vickers; Great Britain
1964 Tokyo	Ken Matthews; Great Britain	Dieter Lindner; United Team of Germany	Volodymyr Holubnychy; Soviet Union
1968 Mexico City	Volodymyr Holubnychy; Soviet Union	José Pedraza; Mexico	Nikolay Smaga; Soviet Union
1972 Munich	Peter Frenkel; East Germany	Volodymyr Holubnychy; Soviet Union	Hans-Georg Reimann; East Germany
1976 Montreal	Daniel Bautista; Mexico	Hans-Georg Reimann; East Germany	Peter Frenkel; East Germany
1980 Moscow	Maurizio Damilano; Italy	Pyotr Pochynchuk; Soviet Union	Roland Wieser; East Germany
1984 Los Angeles	Ernesto Canto; Mexico	Raúl González; Mexico	Maurizio Damilano; Italy
1988 Seoul	Jozef Pribilinec; Czechoslovakia	Ronald Weigel; East Germany	Maurizio Damilano; Italy
1992 Barcelona	Daniel Plaza; Spain	Guillaume LeBlanc; Canada	Giovanni De Benedictis; Italy
1996 Atlanta	Jefferson Pérez; Ecuador	Ilya Markov; Russia	Bernardo Segura; Mexico
2000 Sydney	Robert Korzeniowski; Poland	Noé Hernández; Mexico	Vladimir Andreyev; Russia
2004 Athens	Ivano Brugnetti; Italy	Paquillo Fernández; Spain	Nathan Deakes; Australia
2008 Beijing	Valeriy Borchin; Russia	Jefferson Pérez; Ecuador	Jared Tallent; Australia
2012 London	Chen Ding; China	Érick Barrondo; Guatemala	Wang Zhen; China
2016 Rio de Janeiro	Wang Zhen; China	Cai Zelin; China	Dane Bird-Smith; Australia
2020 Tokyo	Massimo Stano; Italy	Koki Ikeda; Japan	Toshikazu Yamanishi; Japan
2024 Paris	Brian Pintado; Ecuador	Caio Bonfim; Brazil	Álvaro Martín; Spain

=== Women ===
Games	Gold	Silver	Bronze
2000 Sydney	Wang Liping; China	Kjersti Plätzer; Norway	María Vasco; Spain
2004 Athens	Athanasia Tsoumeleka; Greece	Olimpiada Ivanova; Russia	Jane Saville; Australia
2008 Beijing	Olga Kaniskina; Russia	Kjersti Plätzer; Norway	Elisa Rigaudo; Italy
2012 London	Qieyang Shenjie; China	Liu Hong; China	Lü Xiuzhi; China
2016 Rio de Janeiro	Liu Hong; China	María Guadalupe González; Mexico	Lü Xiuzhi; China
2020 Tokyo	Antonella Palmisano; Italy	Sandra Arenas; Colombia	Liu Hong; China
2024 Paris	Yang Jiayu; China	María Pérez; Spain	Jemima Montag; Australia

== World Championships medalists ==
=== Men ===
Championships	Gold	Silver	Bronze
1983 Helsinki	Ernesto Canto (MEX)	Jozef Pribilinec (TCH)	Yevgeniy Yevsyukov (URS)
1987 Rome	Maurizio Damilano (ITA)	Jozef Pribilinec (TCH)	Josep Marín (ESP)
1991 Tokyo	Maurizio Damilano (ITA)	Mikhail Shchennikov (URS)	Yevgeniy Misyulya (URS)
1993 Stuttgart	Valentí Massana (ESP)	Giovanni De Benedictis (ITA)	Daniel Plaza (ESP)
1995 Gothenburg	Michele Didoni (ITA)	Valentí Massana (ESP)	Yevgeniy Misyulya (BLR)
1997 Athens	Daniel García (MEX)	Mikhail Shchennikov (RUS)	Mikhail Khmelnitskiy (BLR)
1999 Seville	Ilya Markov (RUS)	Jefferson Pérez (ECU)	Daniel García (MEX)
2001 Edmonton	Roman Rasskazov (RUS)	Ilya Markov (RUS)	Viktor Burayev (RUS)
2003 Saint-Denis	Jefferson Pérez (ECU)	Paquillo Fernández (ESP)	Roman Rasskazov (RUS)
2005 Helsinki	Jefferson Pérez (ECU)	Paquillo Fernández (ESP)	Juan Manuel Molina (ESP)
2007 Osaka	Jefferson Pérez (ECU)	Paquillo Fernández (ESP)	Hatem Ghoula (TUN)
2009 Berlin	Valeriy Borchin (RUS)	Wang Hao (CHN)	Eder Sánchez (MEX)
2011 Daegu	Luis Fernando López (COL)	Wang Zhen (CHN)	Kim Hyun-sub (KOR)
2013 Moscow	Aleksandr Ivanov (RUS)	Chen Ding (CHN)	Miguel Ángel López (ESP)
2015 Beijing	Miguel Ángel López (ESP)	Wang Zhen (CHN)	Benjamin Thorne (CAN)
2017 London	Éider Arévalo (COL)	Sergey Shirobokov (ANA)	Caio Bonfim (BRA)
2019 Doha	Toshikazu Yamanishi (JPN)	Vasiliy Mizinov (ANA)	Perseus Karlström (SWE)
2022 Eugene	Toshikazu Yamanishi (JPN)	Koki Ikeda (JPN)	Perseus Karlström (SWE)
2023 Budapest	Álvaro Martín (ESP)	Perseus Karlström (SWE)	Caio Bonfim (BRA)
2025 Tokyo	Caio Bonfim (BRA)	Wang Zhaozhao (CHN)	Paul McGrath (ESP)

=== Women ===
Championships	Gold	Silver	Bronze
1999 Seville	Liu Hongyu (CHN)	Wang Yan (CHN)	Kerry Saxby-Junna (AUS)
2001 Edmonton	Olimpiada Ivanova (RUS)	Valentina Tsybulskaya (BLR)	Elisabetta Perrone (ITA)
2003 Saint-Denis	Yelena Nikolayeva (RUS)	Gillian O'Sullivan (IRL)	Valentina Tsybulskaya (BLR)
2005 Helsinki	Olimpiada Ivanova (RUS)	Ryta Turava (BLR)	Susana Feitor (POR)
2007 Osaka	Olga Kaniskina (RUS)	Tatyana Shemyakina (RUS)	María Vasco (ESP)
2009 Berlin	Olga Kaniskina (RUS)	Olive Loughnane (IRL)	Liu Hong (CHN)
2011 Daegu	Liu Hong (CHN)	Elisa Rigaudo (ITA)	Qieyang Shenjie (CHN)
2013 Moscow	Liu Hong (CHN)	Sun Huanhuan (CHN)	Elisa Rigaudo (ITA)
2015 Beijing	Liu Hong (CHN)	Lü Xiuzhi (CHN)	Lyudmyla Olyanovska (UKR)
2017 London	Yang Jiayu (CHN)	Lupita González (MEX)	Antonella Palmisano (ITA)
2019 Doha	Liu Hong (CHN)	Qieyang Shenjie (CHN)	Yang Liujing (CHN)
2022 Eugene	Kimberly García (PER)	Katarzyna Zdziebło (POL)	Qieyang Shijie (CHN)
2023 Budapest	María Pérez (ESP)	Jemima Montag (AUS)	Antonella Palmisano (ITA)
2025 Tokyo	María Pérez (ESP)	Alegna González (MEX)	Nanako Fujii (JPN)

== World leading times ==
=== Men ===
Year	Time	Athlete	Place
2000	1:17:46	Roman Rasskazov (RUS)	Moscow
2001	1:18:06	Viktor Burayev (RUS)	Adler
2002	1:17:22	Paquillo Fernández (ESP)	Turku
2003	1:17:21	Jefferson Pérez (ECU)	Paris
2004	1:17:23	Vladimir Stankin (RUS)	Adler
2005	1:17:33	Nathan Deakes (AUS)	Cixi City
2006	1:18:17	Li Gaobo (CHN)	Yangzhou
2007	1:17:16	Vladimir Kanaykin (RUS)	Saransk
2008	1:16:43	Sergey Morozov (RUS)	Saransk
2009	1:17:38	Valeriy Borchin (RUS)	Adler
2010	1:18:24	Alex Schwazer (ITA)	Lugano
2011	1:18:30	Wang Zhen (CHN)	Taicang
2012	1:17:30	Alex Schwazer (ITA)	Lugano
2013	1:18:34	Yusuke Suzuki (JPN)	Nomi
2014	1:18:37	Yusuke Suzuki (JPN)	Kobe
2015	1:16:36	Yusuke Suzuki (JPN)	Nomi
2016	1:18:26	Eiki Takahashi (JPN)	Kobe
2017	1:17:54	Wang Kaihua (CHN)	Huangshan
2018	1:17:25	Sergey Shirobokov (RUS)	Cheboksary
2019	1:17:15	Toshikazu Yamanishi (JPN)	Nomi
2020	1:17:36	Toshikazu Yamanishi (JPN)	Kobe
2026	1:18:47	Misgana Wakuma (ETH)	Accra

=== Women ===
Year	Time	Athlete	Place
2000	1:25:18	Tatyana Gudkova (RUS)	Moscow
2001	1:24:50	Olimpiada Ivanova (RUS)	Adler
2002	1:26:42	Olimpiada Ivanova (RUS)	Munich
2003	1:26:22	Yelena Nikolayeva (RUS)	Cheboksary
2004	1:26:46	Song Hongjuan (CHN)	Guangzhou
2005	1:25:41	Olimpiada Ivanova (RUS)	Helsinki
2006	1:26:02	Olga Kaniskina (RUS)	Adler
2007	1:26:47	Olga Kaniskina (RUS)	Saransk
2008	1:25:11	Olga Kaniskina (RUS)	Adler
2009	1:24:56	Olga Kaniskina (RUS)	Adler
2010	1:25:35	Vera Sokolova (RUS)	Sochi
2011	1:25:08	Vera Sokolova (RUS)	Sochi
2012	1:25:02	Yelena Lashmanova (RUS)	London
2013	1:25:49	Yelena Lashmanova (RUS)	Sochi
2014	1:26:31	Anisya Kirdyapkina (RUS)	Taicang
2015	1:24:38	Liu Hong (CHN)	A Coruña
2016	1:24:58	Yelena Lashmanova (RUS)	Cheboksary
2017	1:25:22	Yekaterina Medvedeva (RUS)	Sochi
2018	1:23:39	Yelena Lashmanova (RUS)	Cheboksary
2019	1:25:29	Glenda Morejón (ECU)	A Coruña
2020	1:26:43	Elvira Khasanova (RUS)	Sochiz
2026	1:28:54	Reykhan Kagramanova (RUS)	Saransk
