= Athletics at the 2008 Summer Olympics – Men's 50 kilometres walk =

Men's 50 kilometres walk at the Games of the XXIX Olympiad
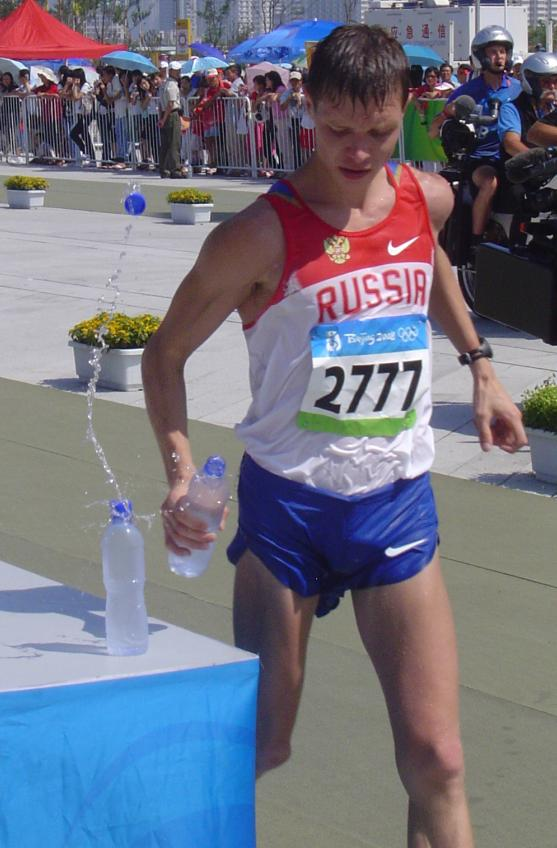
- Denis Nizhegorodov at 2008 Olympiad
- Venue: Beijing Olympic Stadium
- Dates: August 22
- Competitors: 61 from 32 nations
- Winning time: 3:37:09 OR

Medalists
1st place, gold medalist(s)		Alex Schwazer	Italy
2nd place, silver medalist(s)		Jared Tallent	Australia
3rd place, bronze medalist(s)		Denis Nizhegorodov	Russia

The men's 50 kilometres walk at the 2008 Summer Olympics took place on August 22 at the Beijing National Stadium.

The qualifying standards were 4:00:00 (A standard) and 4:07:00 (B standard).

== Records ==
Prior to this competition, the existing world and Olympic records were as follows:

World record	(Russia) Denis Nizhegorodov (RUS)	3:34:14	Cheboksary, Russia	11 May 2008
Olympic record	Vyacheslav Ivanenko (URS)	3:38:29	Seoul, South Korea	30 September 1988

The following new Olympic record was set during this competition.

Date	Name	Nationality	Time	OR	WR
22 August	Alex Schwazer	Italy	3:37:09	OR	

== Results ==
Rank	Athlete	Nationality		Notes
1st place, gold medalist(s)	Alex Schwazer	Italy	3:37:09	OR
2nd place, silver medalist(s)	Jared Tallent	Australia	3:39:27	PB
3rd place, bronze medalist(s)	Denis Nizhegorodov	Russia	3:40:14	
4	Jesús Ángel García	Spain	3:44:08	SB
5	Erik Tysse	Norway	3:45:21	PB
6	Horacio Nava	Mexico	3:45:21	PB
7	Yuki Yamazaki	Japan	3:45:47	
8	Rafał Fedaczyński	Poland	3:46:51	PB
9	Grzegorz Sudoł	Poland	3:47:18	
10	Luke Adams	Australia	3:47:45	PB
11	Antonio Pereira	Portugal	3:48:12	NR
12	André Höhne	Germany	3:49:52	
13	Mikel Odriozola	Spain	3:51:30	
14	Li Jianbo	China	3:52:20	
15	Jarkko Kinnunen	Finland	3:52:25	PB
16	Igors Kazakevics	Latvia	3:52:38	PB
17	Si Tianfeng	China	3:52:58	
18	Jesús Sánchez	Mexico	3:53:58	
19	Marco de Luca	Italy	3:54:47	
20	Antti Kempas	Finland	3:55:19	PB
21	Zhao Chengliang	China	3:56:47	
22	Luis Fernando García	Guatemala	3:56:58	SB
23	Mario Iván Flores	Mexico	3:58:04	
24	Sergiy Budza	Ukraine	3:58:21	PB
25	Fausto Quinde	Ecuador	3:59:28	PB
26	Santiago Pérez	Spain	3:59:41	SB
27	Oleksiy Shelest	Ukraine	3:59:46	
28	Eddy Riva	France	4:00:49	
29	Takayuki Tanii	Japan	4:01:37	
30	Nenad Filipović	Serbia	4:02:16	PB
31	Kim Dong-Young	South Korea	4:02:32	
32	Tadas Suskevicius	Lithuania	4:02:45	
33	Hatem Ghoula	Tunisia	4:03:47	
34	Rodrigo Moreno	Colombia	4:03:52	
35	Milos Batovsky	Slovakia	4:06:30	
36	Xavier Moreno	Ecuador	4:07:04	
37	Konstadinos Stefanopoulos	Greece	4:07:53	
38	Tim Berrett	Canada	4:08:18	
39	Philip Dunn	United States	4:08:32	
40	Augusto Cardoso	Portugal	4:09:00	
41	Mário dos Santos	Brazil	4:10:25	
42	Ingus Janevics	Latvia	4:12:45	
43	Andrei Stsepanchuk	Belarus	4:14:09	
44	Jamie Costin	Ireland	4:15:16	
45	Roman Bilek	Czech Republic	4:18:32	
46	Zoltán Czukor	Hungary	4:20:07	
47	Kazimir Verkin	Slovakia	4:21:26	
	Oleksiy Kazanin	Ukraine	DNF	
	Yohan Diniz	France	DNF	
	Trond Nymark	Norway	DNF	
	Donatas Skarnulis	Lithuania	DNF	
	Sergey Kirdyapkin	Russia	DNF	
	Adam Rutter	Australia	DNF	
	Peter Korcok	Slovakia	DNF	
	Artur Brzozowski	Poland	DQ	
	Diego Cafagna	Italy	DQ	
	Colin Griffin	Ireland	DQ	
	Salvador Mira	El Salvador	DQ	
	Darius Skarnulis	Lithuania	DQ	
	Igor Erokhin	Russia	DNS	
	Joao Vieira	Portugal	DNS	

OR - Olympic Record / PB - Personal Best / SB - Season Best / NR - National Record / DNF - Did Not Finish / DQ - Disqualified / DNS - Did Not Start

=== Intermediates ===
Intermediate	Athlete	Country	Mark
10 km	1. Denis Nizhegorodov	Russia	44:39
10 km	2. Adam Rutter	Australia	s.t.
10 km	3. Jianbo Li	China	s.t.
10 km	4. Jared Tallent	Australia	+0:01
10 km	5. Alex Schwazer	Italy	s.t.
20 km	1. Denis Nizhegorodov	Russia	1:27:38
20 km	2. Jianbo Li	China	+0:01
20 km	3. Jared Tallent	Australia	s.t.
20 km	4. Alex Schwazer	Italy	s.t.
20 km	5. Yohan Diniz	France	+0:08
30 km	1. Jared Tallent	Australia	2:10:38
30 km	2. Alex Schwazer	Italy	+0:01
30 km	3. Denis Nizhegorodov	Russia	s.t.
30 km	4. Jianbo Li	China	s.t.
30 km	5. Yohan Diniz	France	+1:48
40 km	1. Jared Tallent	Australia	2:54:36
40 km	2. Alex Schwazer	Italy	s.t.
40 km	3. Denis Nizhegorodov	Russia	s.t.
40 km	4. Jianbo Li	China	+1:58
40 km	5. Grzegorz Sudol	Poland	+3:56

s.t. - same time.
