= 2007 World Championships in Athletics – Men's 50 kilometres walk =

The men's 50 kilometres walk event at the 2007 World Championships in Athletics took place on 1 September 2007 in the streets of Osaka, Japan.

== Medallists ==
Gold	Nathan Deakes; Australia (AUS)
Silver	Yohan Diniz; France (FRA)
Bronze	Alex Schwazer; Italy (ITA)

== Abbreviations ==
- All times shown are in hours:minutes:seconds

DNS	did not start
NM	no mark
WR	world record
WL	world leading
AR	area record
NR	national record
PB	personal best
SB	season best

== Records ==
World record	3:35:47	Nathan Deakes	Australia	Geelong, Australia	2 December 2006
Championship record	3:36:03	Robert Korzeniowski	Poland	Paris, France	2003

== Final ranking ==
Rank	Athlete	Nation	Time	Note
1st place, gold medalist(s)	Nathan Deakes	Australia	3:43:53	SB
2nd place, silver medalist(s)	Yohann Diniz	France	3:44:22	SB
3rd place, bronze medalist(s)	Alex Schwazer	Italy	3:44:38	
4	Denis Nizhegorodov	Russia	3:46:57	
5	Erik Tysse	Norway	3:51:52	PB
6	Mikel Odriozola	Spain	3:55:19	SB
7	Sun Chao	China	3:55:43	
8	Trond Nymark	Norway	3:57:22	
9	Horacio Nava	Mexico	3:58:17	
10	Jarkko Kinnunen	Finland	3:58:22	SB
11	Antti Kempas	Finland	3:59:34	
12	Donatas Škarnulis	Lithuania	3:59:48	
13	Eddy Riva	France	4:00:44	
14	David Boulanger	France	4:01:30	
15	António Pereira	Portugal	4:02:09	
16	Ken Akashi	Japan	4:02:31	
17	Yusuke Yachi	Japan	4:05:21	
18	Diego Cafagna	Italy	4:06:03	
19	Tim Berrett	Canada	4:06:47	
20	Jesús Sánchez	Mexico	4:07:14	
21	Grzegorz Sudoł	Poland	4:07:48	SB
22	Miloš Bátovský	Slovakia	4:08:22	
23	Nenad Filipović	Serbia	4:12:11	
24	Chris Erickson	Australia	4:13:00	
25	Konstadinos Stefanopoulos	Greece	4:14:22	
26	Augusto Cardoso	Portugal	4:14:38	
27	Jorge Costa	Portugal	4:16:05	
28	Igors Kazakēvičs	Latvia	4:19:43	
29	Andrei Stepanchuk	Belarus	4:23:30	
30	Rafał Fedaczyński	Poland	4:24:51	
31	Kevin Eastler	United States	4:31:52	
DISQUALIFIED (DQ)
—	Colin Griffin	Ireland	DQ	
—	Andreas Gustafsson	Sweden	DQ	
—	Fredrik Svensson	Sweden	DQ	
—	Omar Zepeda	Mexico	DQ	
—	Zoltán Czukor	Hungary	DQ	
—	Jesús Angel García	Spain	DQ	
—	Duane Cousins	Australia	DQ	
—	Yu Chaohong	China	DQ	
—	Zhao Chengliang	China	DQ	
DID NOT FINISH (DNF)
—	Ingus Janevics	Latvia	DNF	
—	Vitaliy Talankou	Belarus	DNF	
—	Anton Kucmin	Slovakia	DNF	
—	Fredy Hernández	Colombia	DNF	
—	Santiago Pérez	Spain	DNF	
—	Aleksey Voyevodin	Russia	DNF	
—	Peter Korčok	Slovakia	DNF	
—	Yuki Yamazaki	Japan	DNF	
—	Kamil Kalka	Poland	DNF	
—	Marco De Luca	Italy	DNF	
—	Vladimir Kanaykin	Russia	DNF	
—	Sergey Kirdyapkin	Russia	DNF	
—	Tony Sargisson	New Zealand	DNF	
—	Jamie Costin	Ireland	DNF	

== See also ==
- Athletics at the 2007 Pan American Games - Men's 50 kilometres walk
