= 2006 European Athletics Championships – Men's 50 kilometres walk =

Men's 50 kilometres walk at the European Athletics Championships

The Men's 50 km walk event at the 2006 European Championships was held on Thursday August 10, 2006 in Gothenburg, Sweden, with the start at 09:40h.

== Medalists ==
Gold	Yohann Diniz; France (FRA)
Silver	Jesús Ángel García; Spain (ESP)
Bronze	Yuriy Andronov; Russia (RUS)

== Abbreviations ==
- All times shown are in hours:minutes:seconds

DNS	did not start
NM	no mark
WR	world record
WL	world leading
AR	area record
NR	national record
PB	personal best
SB	season best

== Records ==
Standing records prior to the 2006 European Athletics Championships
World Record	Denis Nizhegorodov (RUS)	3:35:29	June 13, 2004	Cheboksary, Russia
Event Record	Robert Korzeniowski (POL)	3:36:39	August 8, 2002	Munich, Germany

== Results ==
Rank	Athlete	Time	Note
1st place, gold medalist(s)	Yohann Diniz (FRA)	3:41:39	PB
2nd place, silver medalist(s)	Jesús Ángel García (ESP)	3:42:48	SB
3rd place, bronze medalist(s)	Yuriy Andronov (RUS)	3:43:26	
4	Trond Nymark (NOR)	3:44:17	
5	Mikel Odriozola (ESP)	3:46:34	
6	Roman Magdziarczyk (POL)	3:47:37	
7	Marco De Luca (ITA)	3:48:08	PB
8	Peter Korčok (SVK)	3:51:16	SB
9	Vladimir Kanaykin (RUS)	3:51:51	
10	Grzegorz Sudoł (POL)	3:53:33	
11	Diego Cafagna (ITA)	3:55:22	SB
12	Fredrik Svensson (SWE)	3:56:15	SB
13	Ingus Janevics (LAT)	3:56:32	PB
14	Jarkko Kinnunen (FIN)	3:56:54	PB
15	David Boulanger (FRA)	3:57:08	
16	Andrei Stepanchuk (BLR)	3:57:27	
17	Kamil Kalka (POL)	4:01:28	
18	Ugis Bruvelis (LAT)	4:02:03	
19	Jorge Costa (POR)	4:03:48	
20	António Pereira (POR)	4:07:46	
21	Miloš Holuša (CZE)	4:12:11	
DID NOT FINISH (DNF)
—	José Alejandro Cambil (ESP)	DNF	
—	Alex Schwazer (ITA)	DNF	
—	Antti Kempas (FIN)	DNF	
—	Pedro Martins (POR)	DNF	
—	Aleksandar Raković (SRB)	DNF	
DISQUALIFIED (DSQ)
—	Eddy Riva (FRA)	DSQ	
—	Denis Nizhegorodov (RUS)	DSQ	

== See also ==
- 2006 Race Walking Year Ranking
