= 2006 European Athletics Championships – Men's 20 kilometres walk =

Men's 20 kilometres walk at the European Athletics Championships

The Men's 20 km walk event at the 2006 European Championships was held on Tuesday August 8, 2006 in Gothenburg, Sweden, with the start at 17:15h.

== Medalists ==
Gold	Paquillo Fernández; Spain (ESP)
Silver	Valeriy Borchin; Russia (RUS)
Bronze	João Vieira; Portugal (POR)

== Abbreviations ==
- All times shown are in hours:minutes:seconds

DNS	did not start
NM	no mark
WR	world record
WL	world leading
AR	area record
NR	national record
PB	personal best
SB	season best

== Records ==
Standing records prior to the 2006 European Athletics Championships
World Record	Jefferson Pérez (ECU)	1:17.21	August 23, 2003	Paris, France
Event Record	Paquillo Fernández (ESP)	1:18.37	August 6, 2002	Munich, Germany

== Results ==
Rank	Athlete	Time	Note
1st place, gold medalist(s)	Paquillo Fernández (ESP)	1:19:09	
2nd place, silver medalist(s)	Valeriy Borchin (RUS)	1:20:00	PB
3rd place, bronze medalist(s)	João Vieira (POR)	1:20:09	NR
4	Viktor Burayev (RUS)	1:20:12	
5	Sergey Bakulin (RUS)	1:20:50	
6	Matej Tóth (SVK)	1:21:39	SB
7	Erik Tysse (NOR)	1:22:13	
8	Giorgio Rubino (ITA)	1:22:34	
9	Siarhei Charnou (BLR)	1:23:03	
10	Denis Langlois (FRA)	1:24:06	SB
11	André Höhne (GER)	1:24:35	
12	Predrag Filipović (SRB)	1:25:16	
13	Benjamín Sánchez (ESP)	1:25:58	
14	Andriy Yurin (UKR)	1:26:20	
15	Silviu Casandra (ROM)	1:26:36	
16	Recep Çelik (TUR)	1:27:18	
17	Ivano Brugnetti (ITA)	1:27:42	
DISQUALIFIED (DSQ)
—	Juan Manuel Molina (ESP)	DSQ	
—	Andrei Talashka (BLR)	DSQ	

== See also ==
- 2006 Race Walking Year Ranking
