= Korčok =

Korčok is a surname. Notable people with the surname include:

- Ivan Korčok (born 1964), Slovak politician and diplomat
- Peter Korčok (born 1974), Slovak race walker
