= Erik Tysse =

Norwegian race walker (born 1980)

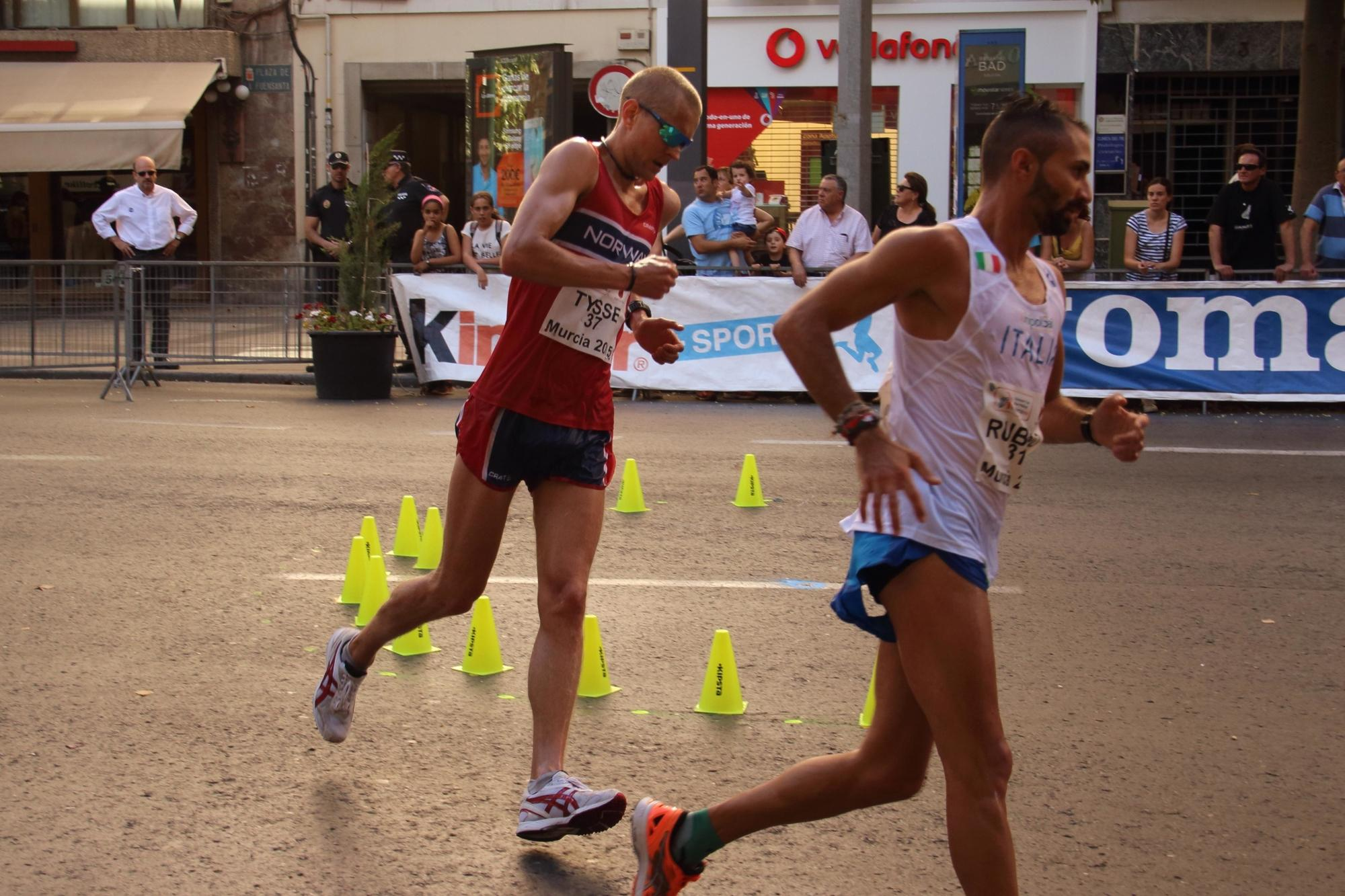
- Tysse at the 2015 European Race Walking Cup

Personal information
- Born: 4 December 1980 (age 45) Bergen, Norway

Sport
- Country: Norway
- Sport: Athletics
- Event: 20km Race Walk

Erik Tysse (born 4 December 1980) is a Norwegian race walker. He has competed at four editions of the World Championships in Athletics and represented Norway at the 2008 Summer Olympics and at the 2012 Summer Olympics.

== Career ==
He began his international career at the 1998 World Junior Championships in Athletics, and finishing in 17th place at his first major event – the 2002 European Athletics Championships. He finished ninth in the men's 20 km race at the 2006 IAAF World Race Walking Cup, but set a Norwegian record of 1:20:34 in the process. He was one of the top performers on the circuit in 2007 and finished second in the rankings in the IAAF World Race Walking Challenge that year. Tysse improved upon his past performance, finishing in sixth place at the 2008 IAAF World Race Walking Cup, and he also improved his national mark to 1:19:11.

Repeating his 2008 victory, he won the 2010 Grande Premio Internacional en Marcha Atletica meeting in Rio Maior, beating Yohann Diniz to the finish line. He stated his intent to reach the podium at the upcoming 2010 European Athletics Championships.

== Personal life ==
Tysse is the younger brother of Kjersti Plätzer and is coached by her husband Stephan Plätzer. His idol is Jefferson Pérez.

== Doping ==
On 8 July 2010 Tysse was suspended from all competitions, after findings of CERA (EPO) in his blood tests from Sesto San Giovanni in Italy. Tysse has professed his innocence. He received a two-year ban for doping and the sanction was confirmed by the Court of Arbitration for Sport. The ban ended 7 July 2012.

== Achievements ==
Year	Competition	Venue	Position	Event	Notes
Representing Norway
1998	European Race Walking Cup	Dudince, Slovakia	63rd	20 km	1:42:02
1998	World Junior Championships	Annecy, France	26th	10,000 m	49:28.12
2000	European Race Walking Cup	Eisenhüttenstadt, Germany	36th	20 km	1:26:35
2001	European Race Walking Cup	Dudince, Slovakia	41st	20 km	1:28:55
2001	European U23 Championships	Amsterdam, Netherlands	12th	20 km	1:26:58
2002	European Championships	Munich, Germany	16th	20 km	1:25:06
2002	World Race Walking Cup	Turin, Italy	53rd	20 km	1:32:12
2003	World Championships	Paris, France	19th	20 km	1:22:43
2004	World Race Walking Cup	Naumburg, Germany	62nd	20 km	1:28:15
2005	World Championships	Helsinki, Finland	13th	20 km	1:22:45
2006	World Race Walking Cup	A Coruña, Spain	9th	20 km	1:20:34
2006	European Championships	Gothenburg, Sweden	7th	20 km	1:22:13
2007	World Championships	Osaka, Japan	8th	20 km	1:24:10
2007	World Championships	Osaka, Japan	5th	50 km	3:51:52 PB
2008	Olympic Games	Beijing, China	21st	20 km	1:22:43
2008	Olympic Games	Beijing, China	5th	50 km	3:45:08
2009	World Championships	Berlin, Germany	7th	20 km	1:20:38
2009	World Championships	Berlin, Germany	–	50 km	DNF
2010	World Race Walking Cup	Chihuahua, Mexico	–	20 km	DQ
2012	Olympic Games	London, United Kingdom	14th	20 km	1:21:00
2013	European Race Walking Cup	Dudince, Slovakia	6th	20 km	1:22:43
2013	World Championships	Moscow, Russia	–	50 km	DNF
2014	World Race Walking Cup	Taicang, China	–	20 km	DNF
2014	European Championships	Zurich, Switzerland	9th	20 km	1:22:19
2015	European Race Walking Cup	Murcia, Spain	19th	20 km	1:24:34
2015	World Championships	Beijing, China	–	20 km	DNF
