= Kazimír Verkin =

Slovak racewalker (born 1972)

Personal information
- Nationality: Slovakia
- Born: 27 March 1972 (age 54) Brezno, Czechoslovakia
- Height: 1.78 m (5 ft 10 in)
- Weight: 68 kg (150 lb)

Sport
- Sport: Athletics
- Event: Race walking
- Club: ASK Dukla Banská Bystrica
- Coached by: Martin Pupis

Achievements and titles
- Personal bests: 10 km walk: 44:23 (2006); 20 km walk: 1:24:13 (2000); 50 km walk: 3:57:17 (2008)

Kazimír Verkin (born 27 March 1972) is a Slovak race walker who took part in two Summer Olympics. He set a personal best time of 3:57:17, by finishing sixth in the 50 km at the European Athletics Race Walking Permit Meeting in Dudince.

Verkin made his official debut for the 2004 Summer Olympics in Athens, where he placed thirty-sixth in the men's 50 km race walk, with a time of 4:13:11. He was the third Slovak to finish, behind Peter Korčok and Miloš Bátovský.

Four years after competing in his first Olympics, Verkin qualified for his second Slovak team, as a 36-year-old, at the 2008 Summer Olympics in Beijing, by reaching an A-standard time of 4:00:00 from the European Athletics Race Walking Permit Meeting. His time of 3:57:17 at Dudince was his personal best at the distance. At the time he recorded it, he had been unemployed for a year, focusing on his walking. He successfully finished the 50 km race walk in forty-seventh place, becoming the final finisher of the event and retiring from his walking career after the race.
