= Athletics at the 2004 Summer Olympics – Men's 50 kilometres walk =

Men's 50 kilometres walk at the Games of the XXVIII Olympiad
- Olympic Athletics
- Venue: Athens Olympic Stadium
- Dates: 27 August
- Competitors: 54 from 29 nations
- Winning time: 3:38:46

Medalists
1st place, gold medalist(s)		Robert Korzeniowski	Poland
2nd place, silver medalist(s)		Denis Nizhegorodov	Russia
3rd place, bronze medalist(s)		Aleksey Voyevodin	Russia

The men's 50 kilometres race walk at the 2004 Summer Olympics as part of the athletics program was held through the streets of Athens with the start and finish at the Athens Olympic Stadium on August 27.

The race had started in the virtually empty Olympic Stadium with fifty-four walkers lining up the field. The Chinese trio of Han Yucheng, Yu Chaohong, and Alatan Gadasu hurtled away from the pack to take the front as they left the stadium. In the early laps, Han made a tactical move to continuously lead the Chinese walkers within five minutes, but he received his first of three warnings, fell off back to the pack, and was later disqualified after the red paddle. Ten minutes into the race, the Chinese duo were soon joined by four other walkers, Russia's world record holder Denis Nizhegorodov and his teammate Aleksey Voyevodin, 20 km bronze medalist Nathan Deakes of Australia, and defending Olympic champion Robert Korzeniowski.

Between 10 and 30k, Nizhegorodov and Korzeniowski moved to the front of the pack and stayed abreast each other through most of the race. At the halfway point, the leading group had been whittled down to four. Korzeniowski was still in the lead with the Russian duo and Deakes attempting to overtake him. While Nizhegorodov and Voyevodin created a gap as they separated from the group to gain a thirty second advantage, it came down to a chase between Korzeniowski and Deakes to take the lead with only one hour to go. Deakes was eventually disqualified after his third warning with the red card, and Korzeniowski steadily broke away from the field to own the remaining third of the race.

At around 35k, Korzeniowski had commanded a 30 second lead over the weary Nizhegorodov and a further 22 seconds over Yu Chaohong. Walking tirelessly in fourth, Voyevodin managed to bridge back to the pack and launched a charge to strengthen his pace closely behind Yu.

Coming through the 45k mark and into the Olympic Stadium, Korzeniowski increased his lead by fifteen seconds ahead of the world record holder before storming his way at the final turn to cross the finish line for the last time in his competitive career. With a historic win, he added a fourth gold medal to his Olympic tally in 3:38:46.

Five minutes behind Korzeniowski, Nizhegorodov appeared unstable on the home stretch, but had accumulated much ground to finish strong with a silver medal, before collapsing to the track in exhaustion. Meanwhile, his fast-charging teammate Voyevodin surpassed the confident Yu just outside the stadium to claim the bronze with a tremendous finish, edging the Chinese off the podium by eleven seconds.

== Records ==
Prior to the competition, the existing World and Olympic records were as follows:

World record	Denis Nizhegorodov (RUS)	3:35:29	Cheboksary, Russia	13 June 2004
Olympic record	Vyacheslav Ivanenko (URS)	3:38:29	Seoul, South Korea	30 September 1988

No new records were set during the competition.

== Qualification ==
The qualification period for athletics was 1 January 2003 to 9 August 2004. For the men's 20 kilometres race walk, each National Olympic Committee was permitted to enter up to three athletes that had run the race in 4:00:00 or faster during the qualification period. If an NOC had no athletes that qualified under that standard, one athlete that had run the race in 4:07:00 or faster could be entered.

== Schedule ==
All times are Greece Standard Time (UTC+2)

Date	Time	Round
Friday, 27 August 2004	07:00	Final

== Results ==
Rank	Name	Nationality	Result	Notes
1st place, gold medalist(s)	Robert Korzeniowski	Poland	3:38:46	
2nd place, silver medalist(s)	Denis Nizhegorodov	Russia	3:42:50	
3rd place, bronze medalist(s)	Aleksey Voyevodin	Russia	3:43:34	
4	Yu Chaohong	China	3:43:45	
5	Jesús Ángel García	Spain	3:44:42	SB
6	Roman Magdziarczyk	Poland	3:48:11	
7	Grzegorz Sudoł	Poland	3:49:09	PB
8	Santiago Pérez	Spain	3:49:48	SB
9	Yuriy Andronov	Russia	3:50:28	
10	Alatan Gadasu	China	3:51:55	
11	Aigars Fadejevs	Latvia	3:52:52	
12	Jefferson Pérez	Ecuador	3:53:04	NR
13	Trond Nymark	Norway	3:53:20	SB
14	Peter Korčok	Slovakia	3:54:22	
15	Miguel Rodríguez	Mexico	3:55:43	
16	Yuki Yamazaki	Japan	3:57:00	
17	Germán Sánchez	Mexico	3:58:33	
18	Miloš Bátovský	Slovakia	3:59:11	
19	Andrei Stsepanchuk	Belarus	3:59:32	
20	Sergey Korepanov	Kazakhstan	3:59:33	
21	Eddy Riva	France	4:00:25	
22	David Boulanger	France	4:01:32	
23	Aleksandar Raković	Serbia and Montenegro	4:02:06	
24	Zoltán Czukor	Hungary	4:03:51	
25	Modris Liepinš	Latvia	4:04:26	
26	Sérgio Galdino	Brazil	4:05:02	
27	Kim Dong-young	South Korea	4:05:16	
28	Jani Lehtinen	Finland	4:05:35	
29	Craig Barrett	New Zealand	4:06:48	
30	Daugvinas Zujus	Lithuania	4:09:41	
31	Tim Berrett	Canada	4:10:31	
32	Curt Clausen	United States	4:11:31	
33	José Antonio González	Spain	4:11:51	
34	Jorge Costa	Portugal	4:12:24	
35	Philip Dunn	United States	4:12:49	
36	Kazimír Verkin	Slovakia	4:13:11	
37	Rustam Kuvatov	Kazakhstan	4:13:40	
38	Miloš Holuša	Czech Republic	4:15:01	
39	Georgios Argiropoulos	Greece	4:17:25	
40	Mario José dos Santos	Brazil	4:20:11	
41	János Tóth	Hungary	4:29:33	
	Spiridon Kastanis	Greece	DNF	
	Denis Langlois	France	DNF	
	André Höhne	Germany	DNF	
	Luis Fernando García	Guatemala	DNF	
	Mario Iván Flores	Mexico	DNF	
	Pedro Martins	Portugal	DNF	
	Theodoros Stamatopoulos	Greece	DNF	
	Han Yucheng	China	DNF	
	Takayuki Tanii	Japan	DSQ	
	Nathan Deakes	Australia	DSQ	
	Andreas Erm	Germany	DSQ	
	Julio René Martínez	Guatemala	DSQ	
	Giovanni de Benedictis	Italy	DSQ	
