= János Tóth (race walker) =

Hungarian racewalker

Personal information
- Nationality: Hungarian
- Born: 15 April 1978 (age 48)

Sport
- Sport: Athletics
- Event: Racewalking

János Tóth (born 15 April 1978) is a Hungarian racewalker. He competed in the men's 50 kilometres walk at the 2004 Summer Olympics.
