= Tatsiana Metleuskaya =

Belarusian race walker (born 1984)

Tatsiana Metleuskaya (Belarusian: Тацяна Мятлеўская; born 14 September 1984) is a Belarusian race walker.

== Achievements ==
Year	Tournament	Venue	Result	Event
2006	World Race Walking Cup	A Coruña, Spain	16th	20 km
