= António Pereira (race walker) =

Portuguese race walker

António Pereira (born 10 July 1975) is a Portuguese race walker.

== Achievements ==
| Year | Competition | Venue | Position | Event | Notes |
Representing Portugal
| 2002 | World Race Walking Cup | Turin, Italy | 49th | 20 km | 1:31:57 |
| 2004 | World Race Walking Cup | Naumburg, Germany | 25th | 50 km | 4:07:30 |
| 2006 | World Race Walking Cup | A Coruña, Spain | 22nd | 50 km | 3:58:39 |
| 2006 | European Championships | Gothenburg, Sweden | 20th | 50 km | 4:07:46 |
| 2007 | World Championships | Osaka, Japan | 15th | 50 km | 4:02:09 |
| 2008 | World Race Walking Cup | Cheboksary, Russia | 17th | 50 km | 3:53:11 |
| 2008 | Olympic Games | Beijing, China | 11th | 50 km | 3:48:12 |
| 2009 | European Race Walking Cup | Metz, France | — | 20 km | DNF |
| 2009 | World Championships | Berlin, Germany | — | 50 km | DNF |
| 2010 | World Race Walking Cup | Chihuahua, Mexico | — | 20 km | DNF |
| 2010 | European Championships | Barcelona, Spain | — | 50 km | DNF |
| 2011 | European Race Walking Cup | Olhão, Portugal | — | 50 km | DNF |
| 2013 | European Race Walking Cup | Dudince, Slovakia | 50th | 20 km | 1:34:22 |
