= José Antonio González (race walker) =

Spanish racewalker

Personal information
- Full name: José Antonio González Cobacho
- Nationality: Spanish
- Born: 15 June 1979 (age 46) Igualada, Barcelona, Spain
- Height: 178 cm (5 ft 10 in)
- Weight: 73 kg (161 lb)

Sport
- Sport: Athletics
- Event: Racewalking

José Antonio González Cobacho (Note: In this Spanish name, the first or paternal surname is González and the second or maternal family name is Cobacho.) (born 15 June 1979) is a Spanish racewalker. He competed in the men's 50 kilometres walk at the 2004 Summer Olympics.
