= Donatas Škarnulis =

Lithuanian race walker (born 1977)

Donatas Škarnulis (born 21 October 1977) is a Lithuanian race walker.

He finished twelfth at the 2007 World Championships in Osaka. He also competed at the 2006 World Race Walking Cup.

== Achievements ==
Year	Competition	Venue	Position	Event	Notes
Representing Lithuania
2006	World Race Walking Cup	A Coruña, Spain	35th	50 km	4:09:31
2007	World Championships	Osaka, Japan	12th	50 km	3:59:48
2008	World Race Walking Cup	Cheboksary, Russia	45th	20 km	1:25:08
2008	Olympic Games	Beijing, China	—	50 km	DNF
2009	European Race Walking Cup	Metz, France	7th	50 km	3:53:43
2009	World Championships	Berlin, Germany	14th	50 km	3:50:56
2010	European Championships	Barcelona, Spain	—	50 km	DQ
