= Eddy Riva =

French racewalker

Eddy Riva (born 17 April 1973 in Thionville) is a French race walker.

== Achievements ==
Year	Competition	Venue	Position	Event	Notes
Representing France
1997	World Race Walking Cup	Poděbrady, Czech Republic	61st	20 km	1:24:47
1999	World Race Walking Cup	Mézidon-Canon, France	58th	20 km	1:30:25
2001	European Race Walking Cup	Dudince, Slovakia	29th	20 km	1:26:20
2002	World Race Walking Cup	Turin, Italy	22nd	50 km	4:00:58
2003	World Championships	Paris, France	11th	50 km	3:53:18 PB
2004	World Race Walking Cup	Naumburg, Germany	—	50 km	DNF
2004	Olympic Games	Athens, Greece	21st	50 km	4:00:25
2006	European Championships	Gothenburg, Sweden	—	50 km	DSQ
2006	World Race Walking Cup	A Coruña, Spain	16th	50 km	3:55:55
2007	World Championships	Osaka, Japan	13th	50 km	4:00:44
2008	World Race Walking Cup	Cheboksary, Russia	53rd	20 km	1:25:34
2008	Olympic Games	Beijing, China	28th	50 km	4:00:49
2009	European Race Walking Cup	Metz, France	14th	50 km	4:04:46
