= José Alejandro Cambil =

Spanish racewalker

José Alejandro Cambil (born 26 January 1975) is a Spanish race walker.

== Achievements ==
Year	Competition	Venue	Position	Event	Notes
Representing Spain
1994	World Junior Championships	Lisbon, Portugal	14th	10,000 m	42:47.62
1997	European U23 Championships	Turku, Finland	9th	20 km	1:24:44
2001	Mediterranean Games	Radès, Tunisia	2nd	20 km	1:28:43
2002	World Race Walking Cup	Turin, Italy	—	20 km	DQ
2004	World Race Walking Cup	Naumburg, Germany	24th	20 km	1:22:28
2006	European Championships	Gothenburg, Sweden	—	50 km	DNF
2006	World Race Walking Cup	A Coruña, Spain	10th	50 km	3:51:32
2008	World Race Walking Cup	Cheboksary, Russia	12th	50 km	3:51:20
2009	European Race Walking Cup	Metz, France	6th	50 km	3:53:31
2009	European Race Walking Cup	Metz, France	2nd	Team - 50 km	13 pts
2009	World Championships	Berlin, Germany	29th	50 km	4:13:14
2010	World Race Walking Cup	Chihuahua, Mexico	—	50 km	DNF
