= David Boulanger =

French race walker

David Boulanger (born 11 December 1974 in Rouen) is a French race walker.

== Achievements ==
Year	Competition	Venue	Position	Notes
Representing France
2000	European Race Walking Cup	Eisenhüttenstadt, Germany	14th	50 km
2001	European Race Walking Cup	Dudince, Slovakia	8th	50 km
2001	World Championships	Edmonton, Canada	12th	50 km
2002	European Championships	Munich, Germany	15th	50 km
2004	Olympic Games	Athens, Greece	22nd	50 km
2006	European Championships	Gothenburg, Sweden	15th	50 km
2006	World Race Walking Cup	A Coruña, Spain	17th	50 km
2007	World Championships	Osaka, Japan	14th	50 km
