= Denis Nizhegorodov =

Russian race walker

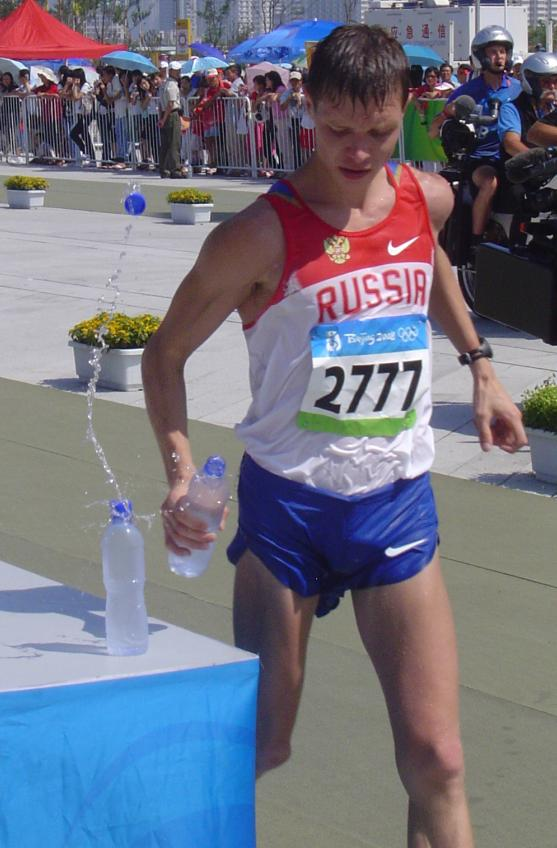
- Nizhegorodov in 2008

Personal information
- Born: 26 July 1980 (age 46) Saransk, Russia
- Height: 174 cm (5 ft 9 in)
- Weight: 63 kg (139 lb)

Sport
- Country: Russia
- Sport: Athletics
- Event: Race walking
- Club: TsOP Saransk
- Retired: 2013

Achievements and titles
- Personal best: 50 km walk – 3:34:14 (2008)
Medal record
Olympic Games
| Silver medal – second place | 2004 Athens | 50 km walk |
| Bronze medal – third place | 2008 Beijing | 50 km walk |
World Championships
| Gold medal – first place | 2011 Daegu | 50 km walk |
World Race Walking Cup
| Gold medal – first place | 2006 A Coruña | 50 km walk |
| Gold medal – first place | 2008 Cherboksary | 50 km walk |

Denis Gennadyevich Nizhegorodov (Russian: Денис Геннадьевич Нижегородов; born 26 July 1980) is a retired Russian race walker. Between 2008 and 2014 he held the world record over 50 km distance, with a time of 3:34:14. He competed in this event at the 2004 and 2008 Olympics and won a silver and a bronze medal, respectively.

In May 2016, Nizhegorodov became one of 14 Russian athletes implicated in doping following the retesting of urine from the 2008 Olympic Games. His sample A failed the retest, but these results were not confirmed on his sample B.

== International competitions ==
| Year | Competition | Venue | Position | Event | Notes |
Representing Russia
| 2000 | European Race Walking Cup | Eisenhüttenstadt, Germany | 17th | 20 km | 1:22:40 |
| 2001 | European Race Walking Cup | Dudince, Slovakia | 7th | 20 km | 1:20:42 |
| 2001 | European Race Walking Cup | Dudince, Slovakia | 1st | Team – 20 km | 13 pts |
| 2001 | European U23 Championships | Amsterdam, Netherlands | 5th | 20 km | 1:23:32 |
| 2001 | Universiade | Beijing, China | 4th | 20 km | 1:25:31 |
| 2003 | World Championships | Paris, France | 5th | 50 km | 3:38:23 |
| 2004 | Olympic Games | Athens, Greece | 2nd | 50 km | 3:42:50 |
| 2006 | World Race Walking Cup | A Coruña, Spain | 1st | 50 km | 3:38:02 |
| 2006 | European Championships | Gothenburg, Sweden | — | 50 km | DQ |
| 2007 | World Championships | Osaka, Japan | 4th | 50 km | 3:46:57 |
| 2008 | World Race Walking Cup | Cheboksary, Russia | 1st | 50 km | 3:34:14 |
| 2008 | Olympic Games | Beijing, China | 3rd | 50 km | 3:40:14 |
| 2009 | European Race Walking Cup | Metz, France | 1st | 50 km | 3:42:47 |
| 2009 | European Race Walking Cup | Metz, France | 1st | Team – 50 km | 8 pts |
| 2009 | World Championships | Berlin, Germany | — | 50 km | DNF |
| 2011 | European Race Walking Cup | Olhão, Portugal | 1st | 50 km | 3:45:58 |
| 2011 | World Championships | Daegu, South Korea | 1st | 50 km | 3:42:45 |

Records
| Preceded by Nathan Deakes | Men's 50 km walk world record holder 11 May 2008 – 15 August 2014 | Succeeded by Yohann Diniz |
