= Wang Zhiping =

Chinese race walker (born 1983)

Personal information
- Native name: 王志平
- Born: 11 December 1983 (age 42)
- Height: 172 cm (5 ft 8 in)
- Weight: 56 kg (123 lb)

Sport
- Country: China

Wang Zhiping (Chinese: 王志平; born 11 December 1983) is a Chinese race walker. He won the 2008 Chinese Athletics Championships in the 20 km walk with a time of 1:19:46 hours and represented China at several World Athletics Race Walking Tour events, finishing 13th at the 2006 IAAF World Race Walking Cup. He later became a national team coach.

== Career ==
Wang began training as a professional in 2000 at the Shaanxi Track and Field Sports Management Center.

In May 2002, Wang finished 24th in the 20 km walk and 9th in the 50 km walk at the Chaoyang, Liaoning championships. Later that year, he was runner-up at the Chinese Athletics Championships 50 km walk in Qufu, walking 4:00:23 hours.

Wang was selected to the Chinese national team in 2003 and placed 3rd in the 50 km at the National Race Walking Grand Prix (Chinese: 国竞走大奖赛). Wang was 22nd in the 20 km and 29th in the 50 km at that year's Chinese Athletics Championships. At the 2003 China National Youth Games, Wang was 10th in the 20,000 m track walk.

In 2004, Wang was 14th at a national 20 km walk competition in Guangzhou and was 25th at the 20 km World Athletics Race Walking Tour event in Kunshan. He was 24th in the 20 km walk and 5th in the 50 km walk at the Chinese Athletics Championships in Yenking.

Wang won the 2005 International Athlete (Chinese: 国际级运动健将) and Shaanxi Provincial Outstanding Athlete (Chinese: 陕西省优秀运动员) awards. He was 11th in the 20 km and 10th in the 50 km at the Nanning national competition before finishing runner-up at the 2005 Chinese Athletics Championships 50 km walk. At the Cixi World Athletics Race Walking Tour, he was 19th in the 20 km and he did not finish that year's City Games. He also won the 2005 Asian Race Walking Championships.

At the 2006 Yangzhou World Athletics Race Walking Tour 20 km meet, Wang was 15th. He was 13th at the 2006 IAAF World Race Walking Cup as the 2nd Chinese athlete behind Han Yucheng. In October, Wang finished 3rd at the Xi'an 20 km walk. He was also runner-up again at the national 20 km walking championships.

Wang won a national racewalking grand prix and Olympic qualifying race in 2007, but he did not ultimately represent China at the 2008 Summer Olympics. On the track, he was 3rd at the Chinese World University Games 10,000 m walk trials and 2nd in the 20,000 m trials. At the National Student Games of China, he was 2nd and 9th in the same two events respectively. Wang was 15th at the Shenzhen World Athletics Racewalking Tour 20 km event and was 4th at the national championships in August.

Wang won the 2008 National Road Walking Championships over 20 km in a 1:19:46 personal best. It was described as his first career podium finish. He did not finish the 2008 Good Luck Beijing race-walking IAAF Tour event and was 20th at the October national championships. Wang was also 3rd at a national 20 km race in 2008.

Wang was runner-up at the March 2009 National Race Walking Championships. He was 46th at the World Athletics Race Walking Tour 20 km event in Wuxi and 6th in a 20 km race in Huhehaote before finishing 19th at the 2009 National Games of China. He was also 3rd at a national racewalking meet and was 4th at the 2009 Chinese Grand Prix, both in the 20 km events.

== Personal life ==
Wang is from Shenmu, Yulin, Shaanxi. He graduated from Xi'an Jiaotong University.

In 2021, Wang became a race walking coach for the Xi'an Institute of Physical Education (Chinese: 西安体育学院). He coached three national youth champions. He was also the coach of the Chinese Race Walking School in 2023. In 2024, he led a training group over a new race walking course in Chenggu County. He was also a coach for the Chinese national athletics team, coaching walkers in athletics at the World University Games.
