= Jesús Sánchez (race walker) =

Mexican race walker (born 1976)

Personal information
- Full name: Jesús Sánchez González
- Nationality: Mexico
- Born: 23 March 1976 (age 50) Mexico City, Mexico
- Height: 1.66 m (5 ft 5 1/2 in)
- Weight: 59 kg (130 lb)

Sport
- Sport: Athletics
- Event: Race walking

Achievements and titles
- Personal bests: 20 km walk: 1:20:52 (2009); 50 km walk: 3:50:55 (2009)

Jesús Sánchez González (born March 23, 1976, in Mexico City) is a Mexican race walker. He set his personal best time of 3:50:55, by finishing thirteenth in the men's 50 km race walk at the 2009 IAAF World Championships in Berlin, Germany.

Sanchez represented Mexico at the 2008 Summer Olympics in Beijing, where he competed for the men's 50 km race walk, along with his teammates Mario Iván Flores and Horacio Nava. He successfully finished the race in eighteenth place by one minute behind China's Si Tianfeng, with a time of 3:53:58.
