= Irina Petrova =

Russian race walker

Irina Petrova (born 26 May 1985) is a Russian race walker.

== International competitions ==
Year	Competition	Venue	Position	Event	Notes
Representing Russia
2003	European Junior Championships	Tampere, Finland	1st	10,000 m	47:12.77
2004	World Junior Championships	Grosseto, Italy	1st	10,000 m	45:50.39
2005	European U23 Championships	Erfurt, Germany	1st	20 km	1:33:24
2006	World Race Walking Cup	A Coruña, Spain	3rd	20 km	1:27:46
