= Andriy Yurin =

Ukrainian racewalker

Andriy Yurin (born 20 January 1984 in Kiev Oblast, Soviet Union) is a Ukrainian race walker.

In 2009, he was found guilty of missing 3 doping tests between 2007 and 2008 and banned for 1 year.

== Achievements ==
Year	Competition	Venue	Position	Event	Notes
Representing Ukraine
2003	European Junior Championships	Tampere, Finland	4th	10,000 m	42:53.52
2005	European U23 Championships	Erfurt, Germany	5th	20 km	1:26:52
2005	World Championships	Helsinki, Finland	11th	20 km	1:22:15
2006	European Championships	Gothenburg, Sweden	14th	20 km	1:26:20
