= Igors Kazakevičs =

Latvian race walker

Personal information
- Born: 17 April 1980 (age 45) Vietalva, Pļaviņu, Latvian SSR, Soviet Union
- Height: 1.76 m (5 ft 9 in)
- Weight: 76 kg (168 lb)

Sport
- Country: Latvia
- Sport: Athletics
- Event: 50 km Race Walk
- Coached by: Brigita Krauze

Igors Kazakevičs (born 17 April 1980) is a Latvian race walker.

== Achievements ==
Year	Competition	Venue	Position	Event	Notes
Representing Latvia
2006	World Race Walking Cup	A Coruña, Spain	38th	50 km	
2007	World Championships	Osaka, Japan	28th	50 km	
2008	World Race Walking Cup	Cheboksary, Russia	15th	50 km	
2008	Summer Olympics	Beijing, China	16th	50 km	
2012	Summer Olympics	London, Great Britain	44th	50 km	
