= Fredrik Svensson (race walker) =

Swedish racewalker (born 1973)

Fredrik Svensson (born 10 September 1973) is a Swedish race walker.

== Career ==
A career-high placement was 13th in the 50 kilometres walk at the 2002 European Championships. Svensson then finished 15th in the 50 kilometres walk at the 2003 World Championships, setting a new personal best by one second: 3:56:31 hours. He was however disqualified at the 2005 World Championships.

In 2006 he set a Swedish record in the extreme distance 100 kilometres walk, which stood for several decades. At the 2006 European Championships on home soil in Gothenburg he reached a new career high with a 12th place. From the fall of 2006 until the summer of 2007, he had to cope with a strained hamstring, but returned in time to try to qualify for the 2007 World Championships. He reached the championship, but was disqualified again, as was the other Swedish walker Andreas Gustafsson.

Svensson took part in seven Finland–Sweden Internationals.

== Personal life ==
His brother Christer and sister Monica were racewalkers as well. Both participated in the Finland–Sweden International more times than Fredrik; Monica over 20 times. All represented the club Växjö AIS.

== Achievements ==
Year	Competition	Venue	Position	Notes
Representing Sweden
2000	European Race Walking Cup	Eisenhüttenstadt, Germany	24th	50 km
2001	European Race Walking Cup	Dudince, Slovakia	19th	50 km
2001	World Championships	Edmonton, Canada	26th	50 km
2002	European Championships	Munich, Germany	13th	50 km
2002	World Race Walking Cup	Turin, Italy	20th	50 km
2003	World Championships	Paris, France	15th	50 km
2004	World Race Walking Cup	Naumburg, Germany	20th	50 km
2005	World Championships	Helsinki, Finland	DSQ	50 km
2006	European Championships	Gothenburg, Sweden	12th	50 km
2007	World Championships	Osaka, Japan	DSQ	50 km
