= Mikel Odriozola =

Spanish racewalker

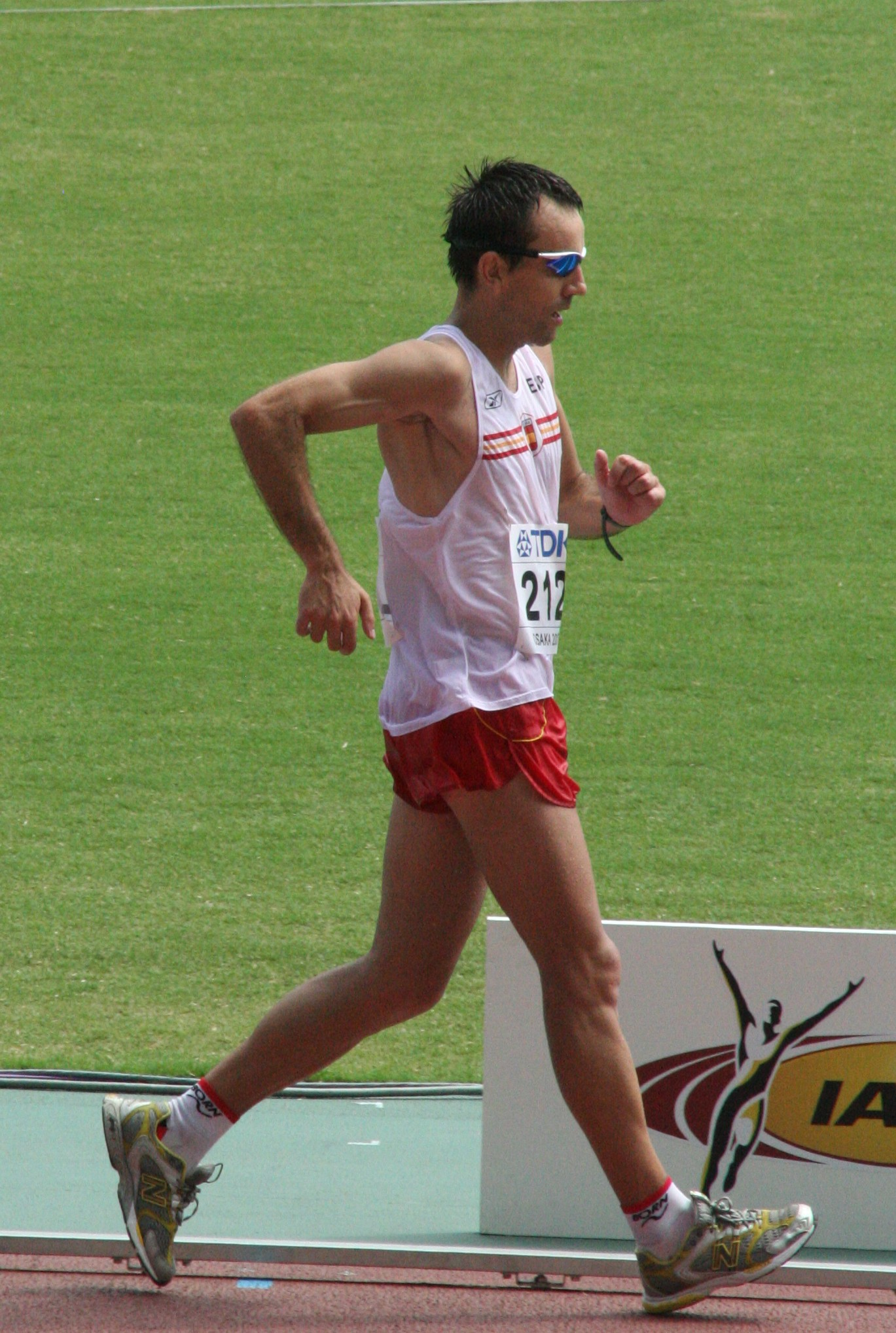
- Odriozola at the 2007 World Championships in Athletics.

Personal information
- Born: May 25, 1973 (age 53)
- Height: 1.78 m (5 ft 10 in)
- Weight: 67 kg (148 lb)

Sport
- Country: Spain
- Sport: Athletics
- Event: 50km Race Walk

Mikel Odriozola Domínguez (born 25 May 1973 in Errenteria, Guipúzcoa) is a Spanish race walker.

== Achievements ==
Year	Competition	Venue	Position	Event	Notes
Representing Spain
1997	World Race Walking Cup	Poděbrady, Czech Republic	48th	50 km	4:08:07
1998	European Championships	Budapest, Hungary	4th	50 km	3:47:24
1999	World Race Walking Cup	Mézidon-Canon, France	23rd	50 km	3:51:01
1999	World Championships	Seville, Spain	18th	20 km	1:29:03
2000	Olympic Games	Sydney, Australia	24th	50 km	3:59:50
2001	European Race Walking Cup	Dudince, Slovakia	27th	20 km	1:26:12
2001	European Race Walking Cup	Dudince, Slovakia	2nd	Team - 20 km	34 pts
2001	World Championships	Edmonton, Canada	15th	50 km	3:57:17
2002	European Championships	Munich, Germany	—	50 km	DQ
2003	World Championships	Paris, France	14th	50 km	3:56:27
2004	World Race Walking Cup	Naumburg, Germany	—	50 km	DNF
2005	World Championships	Helsinki, Finland	—	50 km	DQ
2006	European Championships	Gothenburg, Sweden	5th	50 km	3:46:34
2006	World Race Walking Cup	A Coruña, Spain	4th	50 km	3:44:59
2007	World Championships	Osaka, Japan	6th	50 km	3:55:19
2008	World Race Walking Cup	Cheboksary, Russia	4th	50 km	3:47:30
2008	Olympic Games	Beijing, China	13th	50 km	3:51:30
2009	European Race Walking Cup	Metz, France	5th	50 km	3:53:13
2009	European Race Walking Cup	Metz, France	2nd	Team - 50 km	13 pts
2009	World Championships	Berlin, Germany	26th	50 km	4:00:54
2010	World Race Walking Cup	Chihuahua, Mexico	11th	50 km	3:58:15
2010	European Championships	Barcelona, Spain	—	50 km	DNF
2011	World Championships	Daegu, South Korea	—	50 km	DQ
2012	World Race Walking Cup	Saransk, Russia	32nd	50 km	4:03:19
2012	Olympic Games	London, United Kingdom	41st	50 km	4:08:16
2013	European Race Walking Cup	Dudince, Slovakia	19th	50 km	4:02:47
2014	World Race Walking Cup	Taicang, China	28th	50 km	3:59:03
