= Andrei Stepanchuk =

Belarusian racewalker

Andrei Uladzimirovich Stsepanchuk (Belarusian: Андрэй Уладзіміравіч Сцепанчук; born 12 June 1979 in Minsk) is a male race walker from Belarus.

== Achievements ==
Year	Competition	Venue	Position	Event	Notes
Representing Belarus
1998	World Junior Championships	Annecy, France	14th	10,000 m	45:18.19
2001	European U23 Championships	Amsterdam, Netherlands	9th	20 km	1:25:24
2004	World Race Walking Cup	Naumburg, Germany	18th	50 km	3:58:31
2004	Olympic Games	Athens, Greece	19th	50 km	3:59:32
2005	World Championships	Helsinki, Finland	—	50 km	DNF
2006	World Race Walking Cup	A Coruña, Spain	13th	50 km	3:54:31
2006	European Championships	Gothenburg, Sweden	16th	50 km	3:57:27
2007	World Championships	Osaka, Japan	29th	50 km	4:23:30
2009	European Race Walking Cup	Metz, France	—	50 km	DNF
