= Ingus Janevics =

Latvian race walker

Ingus Janevics (born 29 April 1986 in Ventspils) is a Latvian race walker. He participated in the 2008 Summer Olympics.

== Achievements ==
Year	Competition	Venue	Position	Event	Notes
Representing the Latvia
2004	World Junior Championships	Grosseto, Italy	15th	10,000 m	42:22.06
2004	World Race Walking Cup (U20)	Naumburg, Germany	15th	10 km	43:41
2005	European Junior Championships	Kaunas, Lithuania	7th	10,000 m	42:22.40
2006	European Championships	Gothenburg, Sweden	13th	50 km	3:56:32
2006	World Race Walking Cup	A Coruña, Spain	18th	50 km	3:56:54
2007	World Championships	Osaka, Japan	—	50 km	DNF
2008	World Race Walking Cup	Cheboksary, Russia	9th	50 km	3:49:50
2009	European Race Walking Cup	Metz, France	—	50 km	DNF
2009	World Championships	Berlin, Germany	—	50 km	DNF
