= Siarhei Charnou =

Belarusian race walker

Siarhei Charnou (Belarusian: Сяргей Чарноў; born 5 February 1979, in Minsk) is a Belarusian race walker. His name is also spelled as Sergey Chernov.

== Achievements ==
| Year | Competition | Venue | Position | Event | Notes |
Representing Belarus
| 2005 | Universiade | İzmir, Turkey | 11th | 20 km | |
| 2006 | World Race Walking Cup | A Coruña, Spain | 11th | 20 km | |
| 2006 | European Championships | Gothenburg, Sweden | 9th | 20 km | |
| 2008 | Olympic Games | Beijing, China | 44th | 20 km | |
