= Konstadinos Stefanopoulos =

Greek race walker

Personal information
- Nationality: Greece
- Born: 11 July 1984 (age 42) Veroia, Greece
- Height: 1.84 m (6 ft 1/2 in)
- Weight: 70 kg (154 lb)

Sport
- Sport: Athletics
- Event: Race walking

Achievements and titles
- Personal bests: 20 km walk: 1:25:56 (2009); 50 km walk: 4:03:12 (2009)

Konstadinos Stefanopoulos (Greek: Κωνσταντίνος Στεφανόπουλος; born July 11, 1984, in Veroia) is a Greek race walker. He is a four-time national champion for the 50 km race walk.

Stefanopoulos represented Greece at the 2008 Summer Olympics in Beijing, where he competed for the men's 50 km race walk. He finished the race in thirty-seventh place by quarter of a minute (25 seconds) ahead of Canadian racewalker Tim Berrett, with a time of 4:07:53.
