= Yohann Diniz =

French racewalker

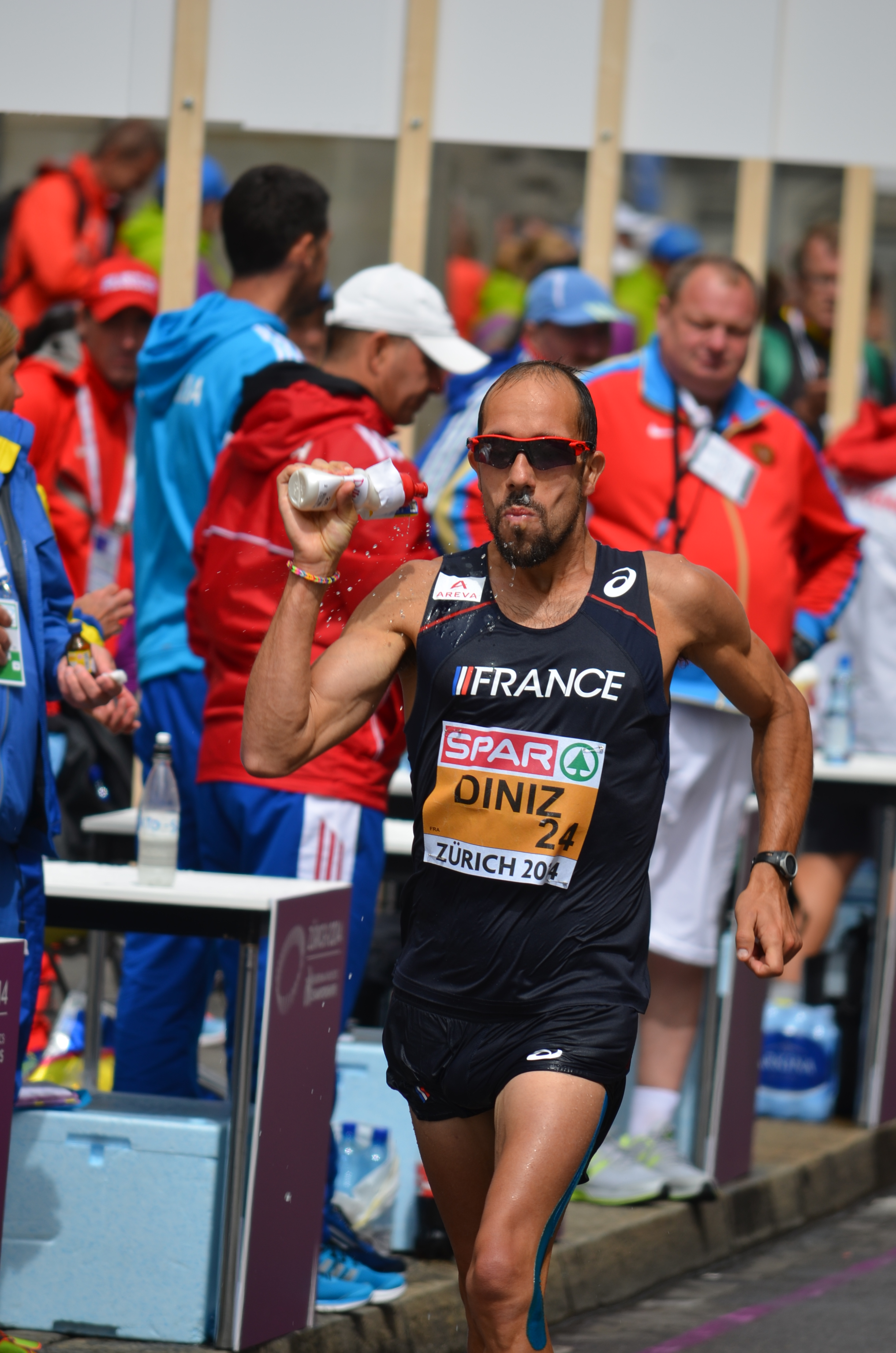
- Diniz at the 2014 European Athletics Championships in Zürich

Personal information
- Born: 1 January 1978 (age 48) Épernay, France
- Height: 1.85 m (6 ft 1 in)
- Weight: 66 kg

Sport
- Country: France
- Sport: Athletics
- Event: 50 km race walk
- Club: EFS Reims Athlétisme
- Coached by: Gilles Rocca
Medal record
World Championships
Gold medal – first place	2017 London	50 km walk
Silver medal – second place	2007 Osaka	50 km walk
European Championships
Gold medal – first place	2006 Gothenburg	50 km walk
Gold medal – first place	2010 Barcelona	50 km walk
Gold medal – first place	2014 Zürich	50 km walk

Yohann Diniz (born 1 January 1978) is a French race walker. He set the world record for the 50 km race walk of 3:32:33 in 2014, and the world record for the 50,000 metres track walk of 3:35:27 in 2011.

== Career ==
He won the gold medal in the 50 km race at the 2006 European Championships in a personal best time of 3:41:39 hours. He then repeated the feat at the 2010 European Championships in a personal best time of 3:40:37 hours.

In 2007 Diniz won the European Race Walking Cup at Royal Leamington Spa with a French record time of 1:18:58 over 20 km. He then won the silver medal in the 50 km race at the 2007 World Championships.

At the 2008 Summer Olympics in Beijing on an extremely humid day, Diniz was forced to withdraw from the 50 km walking race after about 30 km from the starting line because of pain in the stomach and thigh.

In 2009, he achieved the world's best performance for the 50 km walk – 3hr 38 min 45 sec.

He set a world record time of 3:35:27 in the 50,000 metres track walk in March 2011, defeating Thierry Toutain's previous world mark, set in 2000, by more than five minutes.

At 2011 IAAF World Championships in Daegu, Diniz was disqualified from the 50 km walk for three red cards.

Diniz improved his 20 km walk time to 1:17:43 hours at the Memorial Mario Albisetti in March 2012, placing second behind Alex Schwazer.

At the 2012 Summer Olympics in London, Diniz was disqualified from the 50 km walk immediately after crossing the finish line in eighth place, for taking a bottle of water at the 38 kilometre mark outside a designated refreshment zone.

At the 2014 European Athletics Championships, Diniz set a new world record for the 50 km walk in 3:32:33, 1 minute 41 seconds faster than the previous record despite stopping to ask for a Portuguese flag – in homage to his late Portuguese grandmother – to wave a few hundred metres from the finishing line.

At the 2015 French national walk championships in Arles, on 8 March 2015, Diniz set a new world record for the 20 km walk in 1:17:02. His record only lasted a week. Before it could be officially ratified, it was surpassed by Yusuke Suzuki.

In July 2015, Diniz announced his withdrawal from the upcoming 2015 World Championships in Athletics because of persistent pain in his inguinal ligament that would result in him undergoing an operation soon.

At the 2016 Summer Olympics he led the race, but due to gastrointestinal issues, he fainted multiple times midrace. Nevertheless, he was able to recover and finished in 8th place, six minutes behind the winner.

In 2017 he finally won the 2017 IAAF World Championships in the 50 km walk in London with the second-ever best time on the distance (the best one is also his) : 3 hours 33 minutes and 11 seconds, finishing 8 minutes ahead of the two Japanese competitors who earned the silver and bronze medals.

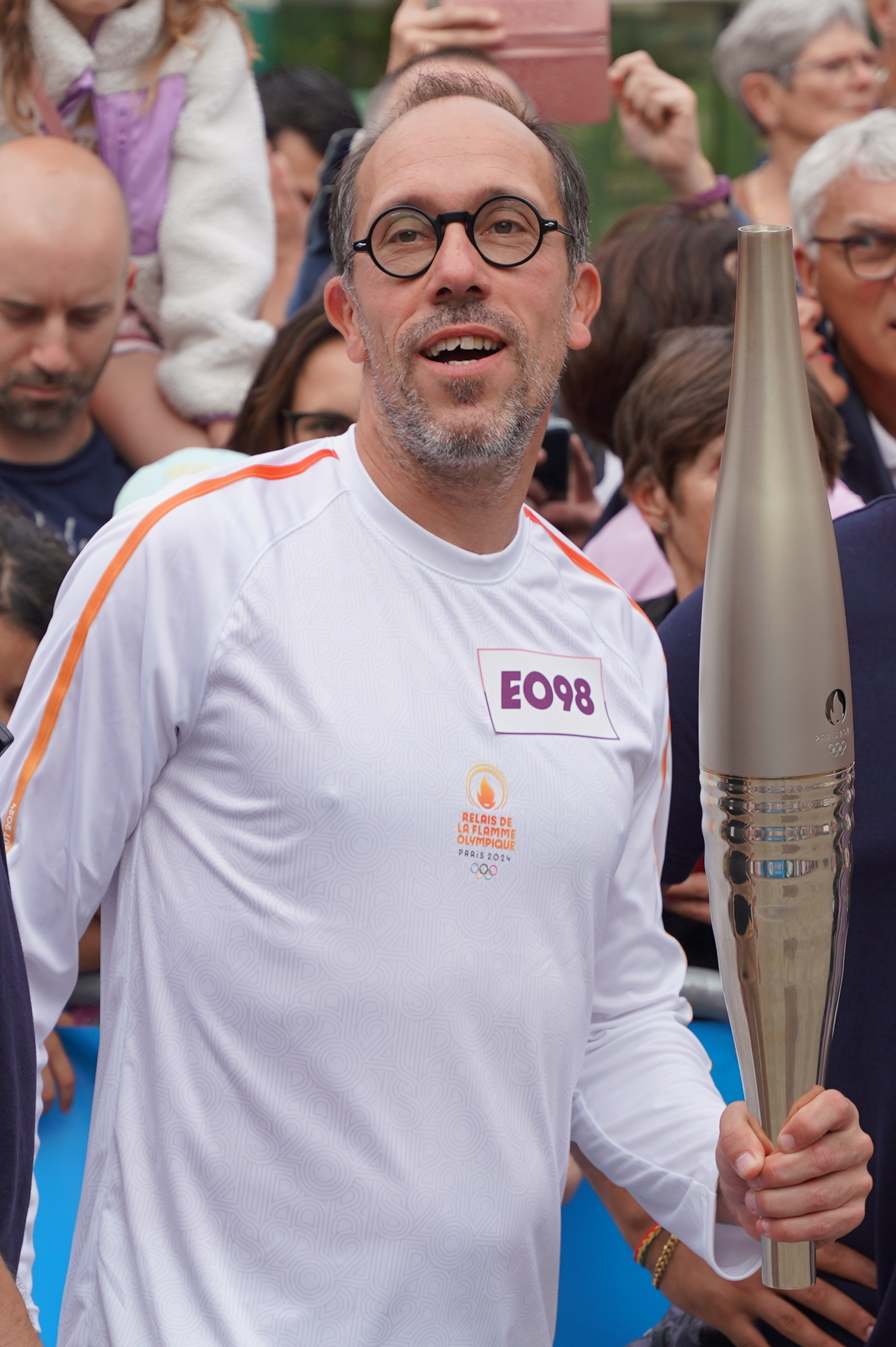
2024 Summer Olympics torch relay

In 2019, he competed in the men's 50 kilometres walk at the 2019 World Athletics Championships held in Doha, Qatar. He did not finish his race.

== Performance at major championships ==
Year	Competition	Venue	Position	Event	Notes
Representing France
2003	European Race Walking Cup	Cheboksary, Russia	40th	20 km	1:31:45
2004	IAAF World Race Walking Cup	Naumburg, Germany	40th	20 km	1:24:28
2005	European Race Walking Cup	Miskolc, Hungary	4th	50 km	3:45:17
2005	Mediterranean Games	Almería, Spain	–	20 km	DQ
2005	World Championships	Helsinki, Finland	–	50 km	DQ
2006	European Championships	Gothenburg, Sweden	1st	50 km	3:41:39 PB
2007	European Race Walking Cup	Royal Leamington Spa, England	1st	20 km	1:18.58 NR
2007	World Championships	Osaka, Japan	2nd	50 km	3:44:22
2008	Olympic Games	Beijing, China	–	50 km	DNF
2009	European Race Walking Cup	Metz, France	8th	20 km	1:26:59
2009	World Championships	Berlin, Germany	12th	50 km	3:49:03
2010	European Championships	Barcelona, Spain	1st	50 km	3:40:37 PB
2010	IAAF World Championships	Chihuahua, Mexico	–	20 km	DNF
2011	World Championships	Daegu, South Korea	–	50 km	DQ
2012	Olympic Games	London, England	–	50 km	DQ
2013	World Championships	Moscow, Russia	10th	50 km	3:45:18
2013	European Race Walking Cup	Dudince, Slovakia	1st	50 km	3:41:07
2014	European Championships	Zürich, Switzerland	1st	50 km	3:32:33 WR
2015	French national Championships	Arles, France	1st	20 km	1:17:02
2015	European Race Walking Cup	Murcia, Spain	3rd	20 km	1:20:37
2015	European Race Walking Cup	Murcia, Spain	5th	Team - 20 km	58 pts
2017	World Championships in Athletics	London, England	1st	50 km	3:33:12

Records
Preceded by Denis Nizhegorodov	Men's 50 km walk world record holder 15 August 2014 –	Succeeded by Incumbent
Preceded by Vladimir Kanaykin	Men's 20 km walk world record holder 8 March 2015 – 15 March 2015	Succeeded by Yusuke Suzuki
