= Alatan Gadasu =

Chinese race walker

- Born: 27 January 1984 (age 42); Hure Banner, Tongliao, Inner Mongolia
- Citizenship: Chinese
- Height: 173 cm (5 ft 8 in)

Chinese name
- Traditional Chinese: 阿拉坦·嘎達蘇
- Simplified Chinese: 阿拉坦·嘎达苏
- Hanyu Pinyin: Ālātǎn Gādásū

Mongolian name
- Mongolian Cyrillic: Алтан Гадас
- Mongolian script: ᠠᠯᠲᠠᠨ ᠭᠠᠳᠠᠰᠤ
- SASM/GNC: Altan Gadasû

Alatan Gadasu (born 27 January 1984) is a Chinese race walker. He was born in Hure Banner, Tongliao, Inner Mongolia. He began representing Inner Mongolia in Chinese national competitions in 2000 under coach Yang Wenke (杨文科). He went on to join the Chinese national team in 2002.

He was able to place 10th at the 2004 XXVIII Olympic Games, Olympic Stadium, Athina ^{(4)}

== Achievements ==
Year	Competition	Venue	Position	Event	Notes
Representing China
2004	Olympic Games	Athens, Greece	10th	50 km	
2004	World Race Walking Cup	Naumburg, Germany	5th	50 km	
2006	Challenger International	Tlalnepantla, Mexico	1st	50 km	
