= Viktor Burayev =

Russian racewalker

Viktor Mikhaylovich Burayev (Russian: Виктор Михайлович Бураев; born 23 August 1982, in Penza) is a male race walker from Russia. On August 5, 2008, Burayev and training partners Sergey Morozov, Aleksey Voyevodin, and Vladimir Kanaykin, all coached by Viktor Chegin, were banned from competition, following a positive EPO test. The positive tests were conducted in April 2008. and evidenced systematic doping.

== International competitions ==
| Year | Competition | Venue | Position | Event | Notes |
Representing Russia
| 2000 | World Junior Championships | Santiago, Chile | 3rd | 10,000 m | 40:56.57 |
| 2001 | European Race Walking Cup | Dudince, Slovakia | 1st | 20 km | 1:19:30 |
| 2001 | World Championships | Edmonton, Canada | 3rd | 20 km | 1:20:36 |
| 2002 | European Championships | Munich, Germany | 4th | 20 km | 1:20:36 |
| 2003 | World Championships | Paris, France | — | 20 km | DSQ |
| 2004 | World Race Walking Cup | Naumburg, Germany | 7th | 20 km | 1:20:14 |
| 2004 | Olympic Games | Athens, Greece | 22nd | 20 km | 1:25:36 |
| 2005 | World Championships | Helsinki, Finland | — | 20 km | DNF |
| 2006 | World Race Walking Cup | A Coruña, Spain | 7th | 20 km | 1:20:18 |
| 2006 | European Championships | Gothenburg, Sweden | 4th | 20 km | 1:20:12 |
