= Vladimir Kanaykin =

Russian racewalker (born 1985)

Vladimir Kanaykin Владимир Канайкин
Personal information
- Born: 21 March 1985 (age 41) Atyuryevo, Mordovian ASSR
- Height: 1.71 m (5 ft 7 in) (2011)
- Weight: 60 kg (132 lb) (2011)

Sport
- Country: Russia
- Sport: Men's athletics
Medal record
World Race Walking Cup
Bronze medal – third place	2012 Saransk	20 km walk

Vladimir Alekseevich Kanaykin (Russian: Владимир Алексеевич Канайкин; born 21 March 1985) is a Russian race walker.

== Career ==
He won the 2002 World Junior Championships in the 10 km race, took the silver medal at the 2004 World Junior Championships and finished ninth in the 50 km race at the 2006 European Championships.

He competed at the 2005 World Championships, but was disqualified.

On 29 September 2007 Kanaykin set a new world record for the 20 km race walk at the 2007 IAAF Race Walking Challenge Final, in Saransk, Russia. He walked a time of 1 hour, 17 minutes, 16 seconds to break the record previously held by three-time world champion Jefferson Pérez of Ecuador.

Kanaykin competed in the 20 km race at the London Olympics in 2012, but was disqualified.

== Doping scandal ==
On 5 August 2008 Kanaykin and his training partners Sergey Morozov, Viktor Burayev, and Aleksey Voyevodin, who are all coached by Viktor Chegin, were banned from competing for two years by the World Anti-Doping Agency (WADA) after testing positive for EPO. The positive tests were conducted in April 2008 and evidenced doping. He took the silver in men's 20 km race walk in 1:20:27 at the 2011 World Championships in Athletics in Daegu.

On 20 January 2015, Kanaykin was disqualified for life starting from 17 December 2012, and all his results between 25 January 2011 and 25 March 2011, as well as between 16 June 2011 and 27 September 2011 were annulled. On 25 March 2015 the IAAF filed an appeal with the Court of Arbitration in Lausanne, Switzerland, questioning the selective disqualification of the suspension periods of the six athletes involved including Kanaykin. On 24 March 2016 the court ruled and disqualified all of Kanaykin's results from 11 February 2011 to 17 December 2012.

== International competitions ==
Year	Competition	Venue	Position	Event	Notes
Representing Russia
2001	World Youth Championships	Debrecen, Hungary	1st	10,000 m	42:55.75
2002	World Junior Championships	Kingston, Jamaica	1st	10,000 m	41:41.40
2004	World Race Walking Cup (U20)	Naumburg, Germany	—	10 km	DQ
2004	World Junior Championships	Grosseto, Italy	2nd	10,000 m	40:58.48
2005	World Championships	Helsinki, Finland	—	50 km	DQ
2006	World Race Walking Cup	A Coruña, Spain	—	50 km	DQ
2006	European Championships	Gothenburg, Sweden	9th	50 km	3:51:51
2007	European Race Walking Cup	Leamington Spa, United Kingdom	1st	50 km	3:40:57
2007	European Race Walking Cup	Leamington Spa, United Kingdom	1st	Team - 50 km	8 pts
2007	World Championships	Osaka, Japan	—	50 km	DNF
2008	World Race Walking Cup	Cheboksary, Russia	—	50 km	DQ
2011	European Race Walking Cup	Olhão, Portugal	—	20 km	DQ (doping)
2011	World Championships	Daegu, South Korea	—	20 km	DQ (doping)
2012	World Race Walking Cup	Saransk, Russia	—	20 km	DQ (doping)
2012	Olympic Games	London, United Kingdom	—	20 km	DQ (doping)

- Kanaykin was originally seventh at the 2011 European Race Walking Cup, silver medallist at the 2011 World Championships in Athletics, bronze medallist at the 2012 IAAF World Race Walking Cup, and gold medallist at the 2012 Summer Olympics.

Records
Preceded by Jefferson Pérez	Men's 20km Walk World Record Holder; 29 September 2007 – 8 June 2008	Succeeded by Sergey Morozov
