= Duane Cousins =

Australian racewalker

Medal record
Men's athletics
Commonwealth Games
Silver medal – second place	1998 Kuala Lumpur	50 km walk

Duane Cousins is an Australian former racewalker, born in Bendigo, who competed in the 1996 Summer Olympics and in the 2000 Summer Olympics.
