= Li Gaobo =

Chinese race walker

Li Gaobo (born 4 May 1989) is a male race walker from China. His personal best time is 1:18:07 hours, achieved in April 2005 in Cixi.

He finished thirteenth in the 20 kilometres event at the 2007 World Championships.

== Achievements ==
Year	Competition	Venue	Position	Notes
Representing China
2007	World Championships	Osaka, Japan	13th	20 km
