= Nathan Deakes =

Australian race walker

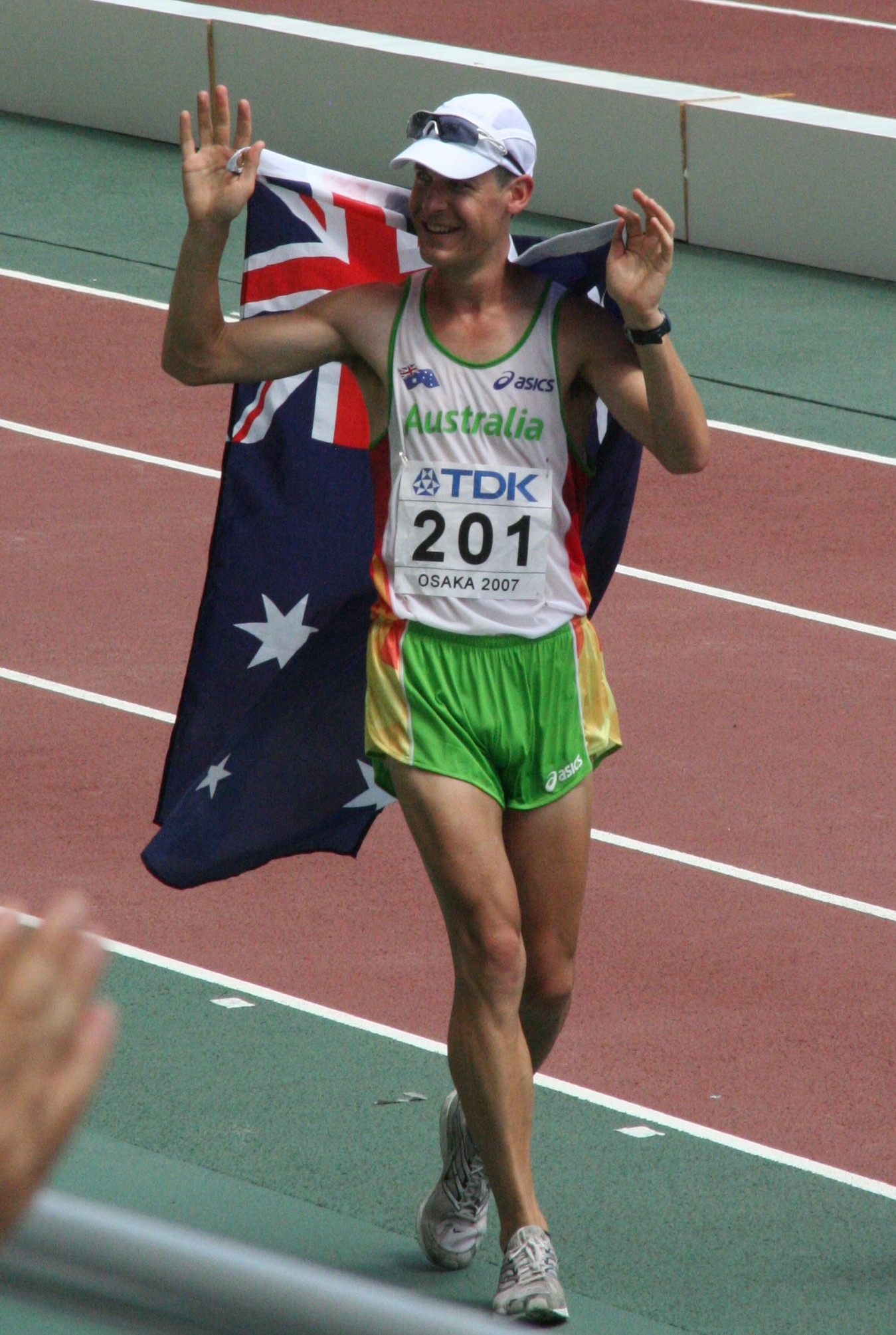

Personal information
- Born: 17 August 1977 (age 49)
- Height: 1.85 m (6 ft 1 in)
- Weight: 66 kg (146 lb)

Sport
- Country: Australia
- Sport: Athletics
- Event: 50km Race Walk
Medal record
Olympic Games
| Bronze medal – third place | 2004 Athens | 20 km walk |
World Championships
| Gold medal – first place | 2007 Osaka | 50 km walk |
Commonwealth Games
| Gold medal – first place | 2002 Manchester | 20 km walk |
| Gold medal – first place | 2002 Manchester | 50 km walk |
| Gold medal – first place | 2006 Melbourne | 20 km walk |
| Gold medal – first place | 2006 Melbourne | 50 km walk |
| Bronze medal – third place | 1998 Kuala Lumpur | 20 km walk |
World Race Walking Cup
| Bronze medal – third place | 2004 Naumburg | 20 km walk |

Nathan Deakes (born 17 August 1977 in Geelong) is an Australian former race walker. Deakes trained with the Australian Institute of Sport under Ronald Weigel and Craig Hilliard.

By performances, Deakes is Australia's best and most successful ever race walker, winning several international medals and holding many Australian and World Records. He was the 2006 Australian Male Athlete of the year, Australia's most prestigious sporting award across all sports.

He won a bronze medal at the 2004 Summer Olympics in Athens, finishing behind Ivano Brugnetti, who it was later established recorded suspicious blood samples around that period, and Francisco Fernandez, who later served a ban for doping after admitting to using the blood doping agent EPO. Deakes was also part of the leading duo in the 50 km walk, until being disqualified around the 34km mark, leaving Robert Korzeniowski alone in front to walk onto victory and a fourth Olympic gold medal.

Deakes is a four-time Commonwealth Games gold medallist. He won gold in the 20 km walk and 50 km walk events at both the 2002 Manchester Games and the 2006 Melbourne Games, becoming the first man to win both the 20 km and 50 km walks at two consecutive Commonwealth Games. He also won bronze medals at the 1998 Kuala Lumpur Games and the 1996 World Junior Championships.

He won the gold medal at the 2007 World Championships in Osaka in the 50 km walk. in a dominant display in incredibly oppressive conditions.

To cap off a successful 2007, Deakes was crowned 2007 Telstra Athletics Australia Male Athlete of the Year for the second time (the first being in 2004). He also was jointly awarded the AIS Athlete of the Year for 2007, sharing the honour with track cyclist Anna Meares.

Deakes broke the 50 km walk world record on 2 December 2006 at the Australian 50 km Road Walking Championships in Geelong, recording a time of 3:35.47. This bettered race walking great Robert Korzeniowski's previous world record of 3:36.03. He is also 4th all-time for the 20 km walk, 1:17.33, and 7th all-time for the 20,000m walk, 1:19.47, and remains the Australian record holder for each of the Olympic distances.

Deakes won the last edition of the Goodwill Games in Brisbane 2001. He beat a strong field consisting of the current Olympic Champion, Robert Korzeniowski, and the then current World Champion, Roman Rasskazov.

On 21 July 2008 Deakes announced that he would withdraw from the 2008 Summer Olympics in Beijing, with a hamstring tendon injury that required surgery to repair.

His last competitive outing came at the 2012 London Olympics, where he competed despite a year riddled with injury and finished 19th in the 50 km walk. He retired from the sport officially in February 2013, and became a board member soon after for Athletics Australia. In 2018 he was appointed as a member of the Athletics Integrity Unit Anti-Doping Panel.

Deakes has completed university academic qualifications with a double degree in Banking & Finance and Law (Honours) from the University of Canberra, a Graduate Diploma in Legal Practice from the Australian National University and a Masters in Law with a Sports Law specialisation from the University of Melbourne. He is published in the area of sports integrity. Deakes works as a Crown Prosecutor.

Inaugural inductee to University of Canberra Sport Walk of Fame in 2022.

Records
| Preceded by (Poland) Robert Korzeniowski | Men's 50 km walk world record holder 2 December 2006 – 11 May 2008 | Succeeded by (Russia) Denis Nizhegorodov |
Awards and achievements
| Preceded by Philippe Rizzo | Australian Athlete of the Year; 2007 (with Anna Meares) | Succeeded by Ken Wallace and Heath Francis |
