= Peter Korčok =

Slovak race walker

Peter Korčok (born 12 August 1974 in Šahy) is a former Slovak race walker. He is the current president of the Slovak Athletic Federation. Korčok finished 14th in the 50 km at the 2004 Summer Olympics.

== Achievements ==
Year	Competition	Venue	Position	Notes
Representing Slovakia
1998	European Championships	Budapest, Hungary	21st	50 km
2000	European Race Walking Cup	Eisenhüttenstadt, Germany	28th	20 km
2000	Olympic Games	Sydney, Australia	23rd	50 km
2002	European Championships	Munich, Germany	11th	50 km
2003	World Championships	Paris, France	13th	50 km
2004	Olympic Games	Athens, Greece	14th	50 km
2005	World Championships	Helsinki, Finland	10th	50 km
2006	European Championships	Gothenburg, Sweden	8th	50 km
2007	World Championships	Osaka, Japan	DNF	50 km
