= 2013 European Race Walking Cup =

- Organisers: EAA
- Edition: 10th
- Date: 19 May
- Host city: Dudince, Banská Bystrica Region, Slovakia
- Events: 5
- Participation: 282 athletes from 29 nations

The 2013 European Race Walking Cup was held in Dudince, Slovakia, on 19 May 2013.

Complete results were published. Detailed report were given. Medal winners were published on the Athletics Weekly website,

== Medallists ==
Event	Gold		Silver		Bronze	
Men
20 km	Denis Strelkov (RUS)	1:21:40	Miguel Ángel López (ESP)	1:21:48	Matej Tóth (SVK)	1:21:51
50 km	Yohann Diniz (FRA)	3:41:07	Mikhail Ryzhov (RUS)	3:44:41	Ivan Noskov (RUS)	3:45:31
10 km Junior	Pavel Parshin (RUS)	41:13	Nikolay Markov (RUS)	41:13	Vito Minei (ITA)	41:26
Women
20 km	Anisya Kirdyapkina (RUS)	1:28:39	Vera Sokolova (RUS)	1:29:18	Marina Pandakova (RUS)	1:29:25
10 km Junior	Nadezhda Leontyeva (RUS)	46:14	Anežka Drahotová (CZE)	46:29	Oksana Golyatkina (RUS)	47:04
Team (Men)
20 km	Russia	20 pts	Ukraine	30 pts	Poland	44 pts
50 km	Russia	12 pts	Ukraine	19 pts	Poland	31 pts
10 km Junior	Russia	3 pts	Italy	12 pts	Spain	13 pts
Team (Women)
20 km	Russia	6 pts	Portugal	23 pts	Spain	39 pts
10 km Junior	Russia	4 pts	Czech Republic	9 pts	Belarus	13 pts
Team (Total)
Total	Russia	45 pts	Ukraine	164 pts	Spain	175 pts

== Results ==
=== Men's 20 km ===
Place	Athlete	Nation	Time
1st place, gold medalist(s)	Denis Strelkov	Russia (RUS)	1:21:40
2nd place, silver medalist(s)	Miguel Ángel López	Spain (ESP)	1:21:48
3rd place, bronze medalist(s)	Matej Tóth	Slovakia (SVK)	1:21:51
4	Aleksandr Ivanov	Russia (RUS)	1:22:15
5	Ruslan Dmytrenko	Ukraine (UKR)	1:22:30
6	Erik Tysse	Norway (NOR)	1:22:43
7	João Vieira	Portugal (POR)	1:23:03
8	Rafał Augustyn	Poland (POL)	1:23:16
9	Robert Heffernan	Ireland (IRL)	1:23:26
10	Christopher Linke	Germany (GER)	1:23:28
11	Andriy Kovenko	Ukraine (UKR)	1:23:34
12	Dzianis Simanovich	Belarus (BLR)	1:23:41
13	Giorgio Rubino	Italy (ITA)	1:23:58
14	Ivan Losev	Ukraine (UKR)	1:24:05
15	Andrey Ruzavin	Russia (RUS)	1:24:11
16	Łukasz Nowak	Poland (POL)	1:24:24
17	Pyotr Trofimov	Russia (RUS)	1:24:41
18	Ato Ibáñez	Sweden (SWE)	1:24:44
19	Ivan Trotski	Belarus (BLR)	1:24:54
20	Jakub Jelonek	Poland (POL)	1:25:25
21	Andrei Talashka	Belarus (BLR)	1:25:53
22	Nazar Kovalenko	Ukraine (UKR)	1:26:12
23	Andreas Gustafsson	Sweden (SWE)	1:26:34
24	Hagen Pohle	Germany (GER)	1:26:39
25	Heikki Kukkonen	Finland (FIN)	1:26:58
26	Matteo Giupponi	Italy (ITA)	1:27:01
27	Kevin Campion	France (FRA)	1:27:09
28	Dušan Majdán	Slovakia (SVK)	1:27:10
29	Sérgio Vieira	Portugal (POR)	1:27:14
30	Francisco Arcilla	Spain (ESP)	1:27:19
31	Tom Bosworth	Great Britain (GBR)	1:27:34
32	Vito Di Bari	Italy (ITA)	1:27:42
33	Antonin Boyez	France (FRA)	1:27:53
34	Arnis Rumbenieks	Latvia (LAT)	1:28:52
35	Brendan Boyce	Ireland (IRL)	1:28:56
36	Luís Manuel Corchete	Spain (ESP)	1:29:17
37	Lukáš Gdula	Czech Republic (CZE)	1:30:00
38	Máté Helebrandt	Hungary (HUN)	1:30:16
39	Vladimir Savanović	Serbia (SRB)	1:30:25
40	Yauheni Zalesski	Belarus (BLR)	1:30:38
41	Daniele Paris	Italy (ITA)	1:31:12
42	Genadij Kozlovskij	Lithuania (LTU)	1:31:14
43	Alex Wright	Great Britain (GBR)	1:31:17
44	Tadas Šuškevičius	Lithuania (LTU)	1:32:19
45	Aleksi Ojala	Finland (FIN)	1:32:39
46	Karel Ketner	Czech Republic (CZE)	1:33:08
47	Cian McManamon	Ireland (IRL)	1:33:12
48	Aurelien Quinion	France (FRA)	1:33:22
49	Carl Dohmann	Germany (GER)	1:33:29
50	António Pereira	Portugal (POR)	1:34:22
51	Zdeno Babík	Slovakia (SVK)	1:34:25
52	Nils Brembach	Germany (GER)	1:34:35
53	Pavel Schrom	Czech Republic (CZE)	1:35:25
54	Sándor Rácz	Hungary (HUN)	1:35:53
55	Lauri Lelumees	Estonia (EST)	1:36:06
56	Miklós Srp	Hungary (HUN)	1:38:52
57	Kemal Gelecek	Turkey (TUR)	1:40:40
58	Edgars Gjačs	Latvia (LAT)	1:42:10
59	Joakim Sælen	Norway (NOR)	1:43:52
60	Ozgur Ozan Pamuk	Turkey (TUR)	1:45:00
61	Iurii Tatarciuc	Moldova (MDA)	1:45:11
62	Ersin Tacir	Turkey (TUR)	1:46:16
—	Janis Strautinš	Latvia (LAT)	DQ
—	Håvard Haukenes	Norway (NOR)	DQ
—	Fabio Ruzzier	Slovenia (SLO)	DQ
—	Vladimir Veršec	Slovenia (SLO)	DQ
—	Benjamín Sánchez	Spain (ESP)	DNF
—	Eemeli Kiiski	Finland (FIN)	DNF
—	Keny Guinaudeau	France (FRA)	DNF
—	Marius Žiūkas	Lithuania (LTU)	DNF
—	Dawid Tomala	Poland (POL)	DNF
—	Antón Kučmín	Slovakia (SVK)	DNF
—	Anders Hansson	Sweden (SWE)	DNF
—	Perseus Karlström	Sweden (SWE)	DNF
—	Serkan Dogan	Turkey (TUR)	DNF

==== Team (20 km Men) ====
Place	Country	Points
1st place, gold medalist(s)	Russia	20 pts
2nd place, silver medalist(s)	Ukraine	30 pts
3rd place, bronze medalist(s)	Poland	44 pts
4	Belarus	52 pts
5	Spain	68 pts
6	Italy	71 pts
7	Slovakia	82 pts
8	Germany	83 pts
9	Portugal	86 pts
10	Ireland	91 pts
11	France	108 pts
12	Czech Republic	136 pts
13	Hungary	148 pts
14	Turkey	179 pts

=== Men's 50 km ===
Place	Athlete	Nation	Time
1st place, gold medalist(s)	Yohann Diniz	France (FRA)	3:41:07
2nd place, silver medalist(s)	Mikhail Ryzhov	Russia (RUS)	3:44:41
3rd place, bronze medalist(s)	Ivan Noskov	Russia (RUS)	3:45:31
4	Ihor Hlavan	Ukraine (UKR)	3:46:09
5	Grzegorz Sudoł	Poland (POL)	3:46:41
6	Ivan Banzeruk	Ukraine (UKR)	3:47:35
7	Konstantin Maksimov	Russia (RUS)	3:47:48
8	Rafał Sikora	Poland (POL)	3:48:13
9	Serhiy Budza	Ukraine (UKR)	3:49:24
10	Aléxandros Papamihaíl	Greece (GRE)	3:51:05
11	Jesús Ángel García	Spain (ESP)	3:52:37
12	Claudio Villanueva	Spain (ESP)	3:52:39
13	Oleksiy Kazanin	Ukraine (UKR)	3:54:40
14	José Ignacio Díaz	Spain (ESP)	3:54:47
15	Jean-Jacques Nkouloukidi	Italy (ITA)	3:56:32
16	Teodorico Caporaso	Italy (ITA)	3:56:45
17	Pedro Isidro	Portugal (POR)	3:57:09
18	Michał Stasiewicz	Poland (POL)	3:57:28
19	Mikel Odriozola	Spain (ESP)	4:02:47
20	Lorenzo Dessi	Italy (ITA)	4:06:44
21	Michael Doyle	Ireland (IRL)	4:08:02
22	Cédric Houssaye	France (FRA)	4:08:09
23	Xavier Le Coz	France (FRA)	4:09:40
24	Pedro Martins	Portugal (POR)	4:12:37
25	Luís Gil	Portugal (POR)	4:13:02
26	Dzianis Krauchuk	Belarus (BLR)	4:18:38
27	Pavel Yarokhau	Belarus (BLR)	4:19:54
28	Dionísio Ventura	Portugal (POR)	4:25:36
29	Dávid Töködi	Hungary (HUN)	4:28:02
30	Peter Tichý	Slovakia (SVK)	4:34:45
31	Milan Rízek	Slovakia (SVK)	4:36:27
32	Dušan Krajčovič	Slovakia (SVK)	4:50:01
33	Zdenko Medera	Slovakia (SVK)	4:51:25
34	Yury Varanchuk	Belarus (BLR)	4:51:41
—	Stanislav Tanchev	Bulgaria (BUL)	DQ
—	Margus Luik	Estonia (EST)	DQ
—	Dominic King	Great Britain (GBR)	DQ
—	Nils Gloger	Germany (GER)	DQ
—	Tomas Gaidamavičius	Lithuania (LTU)	DQ
—	Łukasz Augustyn	Poland (POL)	DQ
—	Aleksey Bartsaykin	Russia (RUS)	DQ
—	Alex Flórez	Switzerland (SUI)	DQ
—	Dzmitry Dziubin	Belarus (BLR)	DNF
—	Jarkko Kinnunen	Finland (FIN)	DNF
—	Aku Partanen	Finland (FIN)	DNF
—	Viktor Nemes	Hungary (HUN)	DNF
—	Federico Tontodonati	Italy (ITA)	DNF
—	Ričardas Rekst	Lithuania (LTU)	DNF
—	Marius Cocioran	Romania (ROU)	DNF

==== Team (50 km Men) ====
Place	Country	Points
1st place, gold medalist(s)	Russia	12 pts
2nd place, silver medalist(s)	Ukraine	19 pts
3rd place, bronze medalist(s)	Poland	31 pts
4	Spain	37 pts
5	France	46 pts
6	Italy	51 pts
7	Portugal	66 pts
8	Belarus	87 pts
9	Slovakia	93 pts

=== Men's 10 km (Junior) ===
Place	Athlete	Nation	Time
1st place, gold medalist(s)	Pavel Parshin	Russia (RUS)	41:13
2nd place, silver medalist(s)	Nikolay Markov	Russia (RUS)	41:13
3rd place, bronze medalist(s)	Vito Minei	Italy (ITA)	41:26
4	Marius Šavelskis	Lithuania (LTU)	42:49
5	Marc Tur	Spain (ESP)	42:55
6	Konstadínos Dedópoulos	Greece (GRE)	43:10
7	Sahin Senoduncu	Turkey (TUR)	43:21
8	Diego García	Spain (ESP)	43:41
9	Francesco Fortunato	Italy (ITA)	44:00
10	Jamie Higgins	Great Britain (GBR)	44:08
11	Miguel Carvalho	Portugal (POR)	44:17
12	Damir Baybikov	Russia (RUS)	44:21
13	Adrian Dragomir	Romania (ROU)	44:37
14	Luke Hickey	Ireland (IRL)	44:49
15	Yuriy Shvaryk	Ukraine (UKR)	44:58
16	Zaharías Tsamoudákis	Greece (GRE)	45:10
17	Tomas Bagdány	Hungary (HUN)	45:36
18	Elmo Koivunen	Finland (FIN)	45:37
19	Serhiy Svitlychnyy	Ukraine (UKR)	45:45
20	Łukasz Kostka	Poland (POL)	45:49
21	Adrien Cassagnes	France (FRA)	45:51
22	Yanis Souaber	France (FRA)	46:04
23	Markus Kyrölä	Finland (FIN)	46:13
24	Jonathan Hilbert	Germany (GER)	46:18
25	Rui Coelho	Portugal (POR)	46:23
26	Ondřej Motl	Czech Republic (CZE)	46:27
27	Arturs Makars	Latvia (LAT)	46:28
28	Normantas Petriša	Lithuania (LTU)	46:36
29	Vit Polasek	Czech Republic (CZE)	46:59
30	Artsiom Turkau	Belarus (BLR)	47:18
31	Miroslav Úradník	Slovakia (SVK)	47:21
32	Andrej Dolinský	Slovakia (SVK)	47:29
33	Bence Venyercsán	Hungary (HUN)	47:41
34	Nathaniel Seiler	France (FRA)	47:52
35	Jean Blancheteau	France (FRA)	48:01
36	Nikola Lilić	Serbia (SRB)	48:03
37	Andrei Gafita	Romania (ROU)	48:03
38	Alessandro Cusmai	Italy (ITA)	48:10
39	Szymon Zielinski	Poland (POL)	48:10
40	Daniel Chojecki	Poland (POL)	48:16
41	Cameron Corbishley	Great Britain (GBR)	48:19
42	Michal Morvay	Slovakia (SVK)	48:32
43	Karl Junghannß	Germany (GER)	48:35
44	Cosmin Bahneanu	Romania (ROU)	48:42
45	Tomas Narushys	Belarus (BLR)	49:49
46	Filip Veselouš	Czech Republic (CZE)	50:31
47	Ruslans Smolonskis	Latvia (LAT)	50:44
48	Raivo Saulgriezis	Latvia (LAT)	54:21
—	Vadzim Lamanosau	Belarus (BLR)	DQ
—	Álvaro Martín	Spain (ESP)	DQ
—	Donát Burger	Hungary (HUN)	DQ
—	Muratcan Karapınar	Turkey (TUR)	DQ
—	Maryan Zakalnytskyy	Ukraine (UKR)	DQ
—	Evan Lynch	Ireland (IRL)	DNF

==== Team (10 km Junior Men) ====
Place	Country	Points
1st place, gold medalist(s)	Russia	3 pts
2nd place, silver medalist(s)	Italy	12 pts
3rd place, bronze medalist(s)	Spain	13 pts
4	Greece	22 pts
5	Lithuania	32 pts
6	Ukraine	34 pts
7	Portugal	36 pts
8	Finland	41 pts
9	France	43 pts
10	Romania	50 pts
11	Hungary	50 pts
12	United Kingdom	51 pts
13	Czech Republic	55 pts
14	Germany	58 pts
15	Poland	59 pts
16	Slovakia	63 pts
17	Latvia	74 pts
18	Belarus	75 pts

=== Women's 20 km ===
Place	Athlete	Nation	Time
1st place, gold medalist(s)	Anisya Kirdyapkina	Russia (RUS)	1:28:39
2nd place, silver medalist(s)	Vera Sokolova	Russia (RUS)	1:29:18
3rd place, bronze medalist(s)	Marina Pandakova	Russia (RUS)	1:29:25
4	Irina Yumanova	Russia (RUS)	1:29:37
5	Ana Cabecinha	Portugal (POR)	1:31:48
6	Eleonora Giorgi	Italy (ITA)	1:32:09
7	Lyudmyla Olyanovska	Ukraine (UKR)	1:32:30
8	Inês Henriques	Portugal (POR)	1:32:39
9	Beatriz Pascual	Spain (ESP)	1:32:53
10	Vera Santos	Portugal (POR)	1:32:54
11	Nastassia Yatsevich	Belarus (BLR)	1:33:54
12	Lucie Pelantová	Czech Republic (CZE)	1:34:06
13	Lorena Luaces	Spain (ESP)	1:34:10
14	Olha Yakovenko	Ukraine (UKR)	1:34:39
15	Hanna Drabenia	Belarus (BLR)	1:34:55
16	Agnieszka Szwarnóg	Poland (POL)	1:35:30
17	Raquel González	Spain (ESP)	1:35:39
18	Brigita Virbalytė-Dimšienė	Lithuania (LTU)	1:35:46
19	Paulina Buziak	Poland (POL)	1:35:53
20	Émilie Tissot	France (FRA)	1:36:38
21	Katarzyna Kwoka	Poland (POL)	1:37:11
22	Julia Takács	Spain (ESP)	1:37:22
23	Olena Shumkina	Ukraine (UKR)	1:37:37
24	Daryia Balkunets	Belarus (BLR)	1:38:00
25	Anne Halkivaha	Finland (FIN)	1:38:05
26	Federica Ferraro	Italy (ITA)	1:38:17
27	Alina Matveyuk	Belarus (BLR)	1:38:31
28	Antigoni Drisbioti	Greece (GRE)	1:38:46
29	Agnese Pastare	Latvia (LAT)	1:39:04
30	Inna Kashyna	Ukraine (UKR)	1:39:11
31	Susana Feitor	Portugal (POR)	1:39:22
32	Inès Pastorino	France (FRA)	1:39:35
33	Mária Czaková	Slovakia (SVK)	1:40:24
34	Laura Polli	Switzerland (SUI)	1:40:35
35	Viktória Madarász	Hungary (HUN)	1:40:50
36	Emilie Menuet	France (FRA)	1:41:31
37	Georgiana Enache	Romania (ROU)	1:41:54
38	Marie Polli	Switzerland (SUI)	1:42:37
39	Inga Mastianica	Lithuania (LTU)	1:44:45
40	Kristine Platace	Latvia (LAT)	1:46:17
41	Katarina Strmeňová	Slovakia (SVK)	1:47:24
42	Anett Torma	Hungary (HUN)	1:50:11
43	Miroslava Stašová	Slovakia (SVK)	1:51:36
44	Amandine Marcou	France (FRA)	1:51:50
45	Bethan Davies	Great Britain (GBR)	1:54:11
46	Maarika Taukul	Estonia (EST)	1:56:22
47	Petra Récsei	Hungary (HUN)	2:00:12
48	Vera Toporek	Austria (AUT)	2:05:17
49	Radosveta Simeonova	Bulgaria (BUL)	2:09:35
—	Déspina Zapounídou	Greece (GRE)	DNF
—	Laura Reynolds	Ireland (IRL)	DNF
—	Antonella Palmisano	Italy (ITA)	DNF
—	Elisa Rigaudo	Italy (ITA)	DNF
—	Anita Kažemāka	Latvia (LAT)	DNF
—	Neringa Aidietytė	Lithuania (LTU)	DNF
—	Kristina Saltanovič	Lithuania (LTU)	DNF
—	Agnieszka Dygacz	Poland (POL)	DNF
—	Mária Gáliková	Slovakia (SVK)	DNF

==== Team (20 km Women) ====
Place	Country	Points
1st place, gold medalist(s)	Russia	6 pts
2nd place, silver medalist(s)	Portugal	23 pts
3rd place, bronze medalist(s)	Spain	39 pts
4	Ukraine	44 pts
5	Belarus	50 pts
6	Poland	56 pts
7	France	88 pts
8	Slovakia	117 pts
9	Hungary	124 pts

=== Women's 10 km Junior ===
Place	Athlete	Nation	Time
1st place, gold medalist(s)	Nadezhda Leontyeva	Russia (RUS)	46:14
2nd place, silver medalist(s)	Anežka Drahotová	Czech Republic (CZE)	46:29
3rd place, bronze medalist(s)	Oksana Golyatkina	Russia (RUS)	47:04
4	Viktoryia Rashchupkina	Belarus (BLR)	48:23
5	Noemi Stella	Italy (ITA)	48:35
6	Laura Garcia-Cano	Spain (ESP)	48:47
7	Eliška Drahotová	Czech Republic (CZE)	49:01
8	Gamze Özgür	Turkey (TUR)	49:31
9	Nastassia Rodzkina	Belarus (BLR)	49:38
10	Gintarė Vaiciukevičiūtė	Lithuania (LTU)	49:50
11	Marlena Chojecka	Poland (POL)	49:57
12	Mária Pérez	Spain (ESP)	50:00
13	Filipa Ferreira	Portugal (POR)	50:05
14	Mara Ribeiro	Portugal (POR)	50:37
15	Valentyna Myronchuk	Ukraine (UKR)	50:41
16	Anna Clemente	Italy (ITA)	50:48
17	Amanda Cano	Spain (ESP)	50:49
18	Mihaela Valentina Acatrinei	Romania (ROU)	50:52
19	Živilė Vaiciukevičiūtė	Lithuania (LTU)	51:04
20	Oleksandra Olyanovska	Ukraine (UKR)	51:08
21	Joanna Bemowska	Poland (POL)	51:14
22	Monika Hornakova	Slovakia (SVK)	51:22
23	Kseniya Radko	Ukraine (UKR)	51:32
24	Mercédes Márton	Hungary (HUN)	51:35
25	Erika Parviainen	Finland (FIN)	51:41
26	Veranika Rabchaeva	Belarus (BLR)	52:22
27	Henrika Parviainen	Finland (FIN)	52:27
28	Mariann Lengyel	Hungary (HUN)	52:27
29	Anna Bajon	Poland (POL)	52:42
30	Janine Bandt	Germany (GER)	52:57
31	Mariavittoria Becchetti	Italy (ITA)	53:42
32	Cecile Deleuze	France (FRA)	53:43
33	Lucia Čubaňová	Slovakia (SVK)	54:26
34	Adela Frydrychová	Czech Republic (CZE)	55:00
35	Maxi Woelke	Germany (GER)	55:15
36	Monika Vaiciukevičiūtė	Lithuania (LTU)	55:29
37	Rita Récsei	Hungary (HUN)	56:40
38	Milica Kostić	Serbia (SRB)	57:12
39	Lucia Škantárová	Slovakia (SVK)	57:51
40	Nergiz Adaş	Turkey (TUR)	59:24
41	Sevda Demir	Turkey (TUR)	62:09
42	Inga Ritere	Latvia (LAT)	64:41
43	Sevgi Ahmed	Bulgaria (BUL)	65:16
—	Mihaela Puscasu	Romania (ROU)	DNF
—	Lena Tomas	Sweden (SWE)	DNF
—	Yekaterina Medvedyeva	Russia (RUS)	DQ IAAF Rule 32.2.b (Doping)

==== Team (10 km Junior Women) ====
Place	Country	Points
1st place, gold medalist(s)	Russia	4 pts
2nd place, silver medalist(s)	Czech Republic	9 pts
3rd place, bronze medalist(s)	Belarus	13 pts
4	Spain	18 pts
5	Italy	21 pts
6	Portugal	27 pts
7	Lithuania	29 pts
8	Poland	32 pts
9	Ukraine	35 pts
10	Turkey	48 pts
11	Hungary	52 pts
12	Finland	52 pts
13	Slovakia	55 pts
14	Germany	65 pts

=== Team (Total) ===
Place	Country	Points
1st place, gold medalist(s)	Russia	445 pts
2nd place, silver medalist(s)	Ukraine	164 pts
3rd place, bronze medalist(s)	Spain	175 pts
4	Italy	187 pts
5	Poland	222 pts
6	Portugal	238 pts
7	Belarus	277 pts
8	Slovakia	410 pts

== Participation ==
The participation of 282 athletes ( men/ women) from 29 countries is reported.

- Austria (1)
- Belarus (18)
- Bulgaria (3)
- Czech Republic (10)
- Estonia (3)
- Finland (10)
- France (16)
- Germany (9)
- Greece (5)
- Hungary (14)
- Ireland (7)
- Italy (18)
- Latvia (10)
- Lithuania (14)
- Moldova (1)
- Norway (3)
- Poland (18)
- Portugal (15)
- Romania (7)
- Russia (18)
- Serbia (3)
- Slovakia (18)
- Slovenia (2)
- Spain (18)
- Sweden (5)
- Switzerland (3)
- Turkey (9)
- Ukraine (18)
- United Kingdom (6)
