= 2013 World Championships in Athletics – Women's 20 kilometres walk =

Women's 20 kilometres walk at the 2013 World Championships
- Venue: Luzhniki Stadium
- Dates: 13 August (final)
- Competitors: 62 from 30 nations
- Winning time: 1:28:10

Medalists
gold medal	Liu Hong; China
silver medal	Sun Huanhuan; China
bronze medal	Elisa Rigaudo; Italy

The women's 20 kilometres race walk at the 2013 World Championships in Athletics was held at the Luzhniki Stadium and Moscow streets on 13 August.

The original 27th place walker, Ayman Kozhakhmetova of Kazakhstan, was disqualified for a positive drug test for exogenous testosterone and EPO.

== Records ==
Prior to the competition, the records were as follows:

World record	~~Elena Lashmanova (RUS)~~	~~1:25:02~~	~~London, United Kingdom~~	~~11 August 2012~~
Championship record	Olimpiada Ivanova (RUS)	1:25:41	Helsinki, Finland	7 August 2005
World leading	~~Elena Lashmanova (RUS)~~	~~1:25:49~~	~~Sochi, Russia~~	~~23 February 2013~~
African record	Grace Wanjiru Njue (KEN)	1:34:19	Nairobi, Kenya	1 August 2010
Asian record	Shenjie Qieyang (CHN)	1:25:16	London, United Kingdom	11 August 2012
North, Central American and Caribbean record	Mirna Ortíz (GUA)	1:28:31	Rio Maior, Portugal	1 April 2013
South American record	Miriam Ramón (ECU)	1:31:25	Lima, Peru	7 May 2005
European record	~~Elena Lashmanova (RUS)~~	~~1:25:02~~	~~London, United Kingdom~~	~~11 August 2012~~
Oceanian record	Jane Saville (AUS)	1:27:44	Naumburg, Germany	2 May 2004

== Qualification standards ==
A standard	B standard
1:36:00	1:38:00

== Schedule ==
Date	Time	Round
13 August 2013	09:35	Final

All times are local times (UTC+4)

== Results ==
KEY:	NR	National record	PB	Personal best	SB	Seasonal best

=== Final ===
The race was started at 07.35.

Rank	Athlete	Nationality	Time	Notes
1st place, gold medalist(s)	Liu Hong	China	1:28:10	
2nd place, silver medalist(s)	Sun Huanhuan	China	1:28:32	
3rd place, bronze medalist(s)	Elisa Rigaudo	Italy	1:28:41	SB
4	Beatriz Pascual	Spain	1:29:00	SB
5	Anežka Drahotová	Czech Republic	1:29:05	PB
6	Ana Cabecinha	Portugal	1:29:17	SB
7	Júlia Takács	Spain	1:29:25	
8	Eleonora Anna Giorgi	Italy	1:30:01	SB
9	Inês Henriques	Portugal	1:30:28	
10	Lyudmyla Olyanovska	Ukraine	1:30:48	
11	Antonella Palmisano	Italy	1:30:50	PB
12	Mayra Herrera	Guatemala	1:30:59	PB
13	Qieyang Shenjie	China	1:31:15	
14	Hanna Drabenia	Belarus	1:31:16	
15	Vera Santos	Portugal	1:31:36	
16	Lorena Luaces	Spain	1:31:43	SB
17	Brigita Virbalyté	Lithuania	1:31:58	
18	Kristina Saltanovič	Lithuania	1:32:11	SB
19	Sandra Arenas	Colombia	1:32:25	NR
20	Agnese Pastare	Latvia	1:32:30	SB
21	Nastassia Yatsevich	Belarus	1:32:31	SB
22	Yanelli Caballero	Mexico	1:32:37	
23	Kumi Otoshi	Japan	1:32:44	
24	Paola Pérez	Ecuador	1:33:03	
25	Masumi Fuchise	Japan	1:33:13	SB
26	Paulina Buziak	Poland	1:33:30	
27	Laura Reynolds	Ireland	1:33:39	
28	Antigoni Drisbioti	Greece	1:33:42	PB
29	Sandra Galvis	Colombia	1:33:49	SB
30	Maria Michta	United States	1:33:51	SB
31	Kimberly García	Peru	1:33:57	NR
32	Laura Polli	Switzerland	1:34:07	PB
33	Viktória Madarász	Hungary	1:34:10	SB
34	Galina Kichigina	Kazakhstan	1:34:18	
35	Khushbir Kaur	India	1:34:28	NR
36	Jeon Yeong-Eun	South Korea	1:34:29	SB
37	Neringa Aidietytė	Lithuania	1:34:32	
38	Anita Kažemaka	Latvia	1:34:37	SB
39	Erin Gray	United States	1:34:38	PB
40	Agnieszka Dygacz	Poland	1:34:42	
41	Tanya Holliday	Australia	1:35:18	
42	Wendy Cornejo	Bolivia	1:36:06	
43	Anne Halkivaha	Finland	1:36:17	
44	Nguyen Thi Thanh Phuc	Vietnam	1:36:27	
45	Marie Polli	Switzerland	1:36:31	SB
46	Ángela Castro	Bolivia	1:36:33	
47	Maria Czaková	Slovakia	1:36:34	
48	Monica Equihua	Mexico	1:36:46	
49	Katarzyna Kwoka	Poland	1:36:54	
50	Jess Rothwell	Australia	1:38:03	
51	Sholpan Kozhakhmetova	Kazakhstan	1:38:09	SB
52	Olha Iakovenko	Ukraine	1:39:58	
53	Lucie Pelantová	Czech Republic	1:40:23	
	Miranda Melville	United States	DQ	
	Mirna Ortiz	Guatemala	DQ	
	Olena Shumkina	Ukraine	DQ	
	Lizbeth Silva	Mexico	DQ	
	Vera Sokolova	Russia	DQ	
	Mária Gáliková	Slovakia	DNF	
	Elena Lashmanova	Russia	~~1:27:08~~	DQ (Doping)
	Anisya Kirdyapkina	Russia	~~1:27:11~~	DQ (Doping)
	Ayman Kozhakhmetova	Kazakhstan	~~1:33:00~~	DQ (Doping)
