= Athletics at the 2012 Summer Olympics – Women's 20 kilometres walk =

Women's 20 kilometres walk at the Games of the XXX Olympiad
- Venue: The Mall
- Date: 11 August 2012
- Competitors: 61 from 33 nations
- Winning time: 1:25:16 OR

Medalists
1st place, gold medalist(s)		Qieyang Shijie	China
2nd place, silver medalist(s)		Liu Hong	China
3rd place, bronze medalist(s)		Lü Xiuzhi	China

Official Video

The women's 20 kilometres walk at the 2012 Summer Olympics in London, United Kingdom, was held on 11 August on a route along The Mall and Constitution Hill.

== Summary ==
From the start of the race, defending champion Olga Kaniskina took the lead, and only Liu Hong would go with her. The two opened up a big gap with a chase pack of a Guatemalan, the other two Russians, and the other two Chinese. By the end of 8 km, the pack began to lose walkers, Mirna Ortíz and Johanna Jackson were disqualified, and Liu began to lose contact with Kaniskina, who was leading on her own. Shortly after the halfway mark, the pack was down to Elena Lashmanova and Anisya Kirdyapkina leading Xiuzhi Lu and Qieyang Shijie. An hour into the race Lu began to lose contact, allowing Lashmanova, Kirdyapkina and Qieyang to chase and pass Liu. By 14 km Kaniskina had a 33-second lead. Almost unnoticeably, the gap between Kaniskina and the chasers had come down to 24 seconds at 16 km, with Kirdyapkina and then Liu struggling to stay with the group. After another 2 km lap at 18 km, the gap was down to 17 seconds, still seemingly insurmountable with just one lap to go. With Kaniskina looking strong, the gap kept falling. Kaniskina started to show the strain, and as the pass became inevitable, she began the most pronounced arm swing trying to find a last bit of speed, but it wasn't enough. Less than 200 metres from the finish, Lashmanova went by Kaniskina and on to the gold carpet. Lashmanova finished with a 1:25:02 world record. A broken Kaniskina finished 7 seconds back, just a second slower than the previous world record. Qieyang happily finished another 7 seconds later for bronze. After the finish, Kaniskina was barely able to walk, while a fresh Lashmanova celebrated her victory.

Later, both the original top two athletes, Lashmanova and Kaniskina, and the original fifth place holder, who was also Russian, were disqualified for doping violations, and their results were annulled. After the medal reallocation, the Chinese gained a podium sweep, with the gold medal for Shenjie Qieyang, silver for Liu Hong, and bronze for Lü Xiuzhi. The medal reallocation ceremony was held at the Hangzhou Olympic Sports Centre Stadium on 4 October 2023 after all the events of the Asian Games ended on that day.

== Records ==
Prior to the competition, the existing world and Olympic records were as follows.

World record	Vera Sokolova (RUS)	1:25:08	Sochi, Russia	26 February 2011
Olympic record	Olga Kaniskina (RUS)	1:26:31	Beijing, China	21 August 2008
2012 World leading	Elmira Alembekova (RUS)	1:25:27	Sochi, Russia	18 February 2012

The following records were established during the competition:

Date	Event	Name	Nationality	Time	Record
11 August	Final	Qieyang Shenjie	China	1:25:16	OR WL

Elena Lashmanova's performance in the final was initially considered a world record, but was later rescinded retroactively due to a doping violation.

== Schedule ==
All times are British Summer Time (UTC+1)

Date	Time	Round
11 August 2012	17:00	Final

== Results ==
Rank	Name	Nationality	Time	Notes
1st place, gold medalist(s)	Qieyang Shijie	China	1:25:16	OR, AR
2nd place, silver medalist(s)	Liu Hong	China	1:26:00	
3rd place, bronze medalist(s)	Lü Xiuzhi	China	1:27:10	
4	Elisa Rigaudo	Italy	1:27:36	SB
5	Beatriz Pascual	Spain	1:27:56	SB
6	Ana Cabecinha	Portugal	1:28:03	SB
7	María Vasco	Spain	1:28:14	SB
8	Masumi Fuchise	Japan	1:28:41	SB
9	María José Poves	Spain	1:29:36	
10	Olive Loughnane	Ireland	1:29:39	SB
11	Eleonora Giorgi	Italy	1:29:48	PB
12	Inês Henriques	Portugal	1:29:54	SB
13	Nadiya Borovska	Ukraine	1:30:03	PB
14	Regan Lamble	Australia	1:30:08	PB
15	Mayumi Kawasaki	Japan	1:30:20	SB
16	Melanie Seeger	Germany	1:30:44	SB
17	Laura Reynolds	Ireland	1:31:02	PB
18	Kristina Saltanovic	Lithuania	1:31:04	SB
19	Agnieszka Szwarnóg	Poland	1:31:14	
20	Agnieszka Dygacz	Poland	1:31:28	SB
21	Agnese Pastare	Latvia	1:31:54	SB
22	Hanna Drabenia	Belarus	1:31:58	PB
23	Brigita Virbalyte	Lithuania	1:31:58	
24	Olha Iakovenko	Ukraine	1:32:07	PB
25	Beki Lee	Australia	1:32:14	PB
26	Maria Michta	United States	1:32:27	PB
27	Monica Equihua	Mexico	1:32:28	PB
28	Jamy Franco	Guatemala	1:33:18	
29	Sandra Arenas	Colombia	1:33:21	
30	Claudia Balderrama	Bolivia	1:33:28	PB
31	Ingrid Hernandez	Colombia	1:33:34	PB
32	Lucie Pelantova	Czech Republic	1:33:35	
33	Nguyen Thi Thanh Phuc	Vietnam	1:33:36	NR
34	Kumi Otoshi	Japan	1:33:50	
35	Claudia Stef	Romania	1:33:56	
36	Neringa Aidietyte	Lithuania	1:34:01	
37	Yadira Guaman	Ecuador	1:34:47	PB
38	Viktória Madarász	Hungary	1:34:48	
39	Ayman Kozhakhmetova	Kazakhstan	1:35:00	
40	Arabelly Orjuela	Colombia	1:35:05	
41	Despina Zapounidou	Greece	1:35:19	
42	Paulina Buziak	Poland	1:35:23	
43	Mayra Herrera	Guatemala	1:35:33	
44	Nastassia Yatsevich	Belarus	1:35:41	
45	Vera Santos	Portugal	1:35:51	
46	Paola Perez	Ecuador	1:37:05	
47	Rachel Seaman	Canada	1:37:36	
48	Maria Czakova	Slovakia	1:37:43	
49	Anne Halkivaha	Finland	1:38:49	
50	Milangela Rosales	Venezuela	1:42:46	
	Sabine Krantz	Germany	DNF	
	Sholpan Kozhakhmetova	Kazakhstan	DNF	
	Johanna Jackson	Great Britain	DQ	
	Jeon Yeong-Eun	South Korea	DQ	
	Mirna Ortiz	Guatemala	DQ	
	Claire Tallent	Australia	DQ	
DQ	~~Elena Lashmanova~~	Russia	~~1:25:02~~	Doping
DQ	~~Olga Kaniskina~~	Russia	~~1:25:09~~	Doping
DQ	~~Anisya Kirdyapkina~~	Russia	~~1:26:26~~	Doping
DQ	~~Semiha Mutlu~~	Turkey	~~1:35:33~~	Doping
DQ	~~Olena Shumkina~~	Ukraine	~~1:36:42~~	Doping

- On 24 March 2016, the Court of Arbitration for Sport has issued a decision that all competitive results obtained by Olga Kaniskina from 15 August 2009 to 15 October 2012 are disqualified for doping. The medals and places were reallocated. Anisya Kirdyapkina was also disqualified for doping.
- On 21 March 2022, the Athletics Integrity Unit has issued a 2-year ban for Elena Lashmanova, starting from 9 March 2021, and also disqualified her results from 18 February 2012, to 3 January 2014.
