= 2014 European Athletics Championships – Women's 20 kilometres walk =

Women's 20 kilometres walk at the European Athletics Championships

The women's 20 kilometres race walk at the 2014 European Athletics Championships took place at the Letzigrund on 14 August.

== Records ==
Standing records prior to the 2014 European Athletics Championships
World record	Elena Lashmanova (RUS)	1:25:02	London, Great Britain	11 August 2012
European record	Elena Lashmanova (RUS)	1:25:02	London, Great Britain	11 August 2012
Championship record	Olimpiada Ivanova (RUS)	1:26:42	Munich, Germany	7 August 2002
World Leading	Anisya Kirdyapkina (RUS)	1:26:31	Taicang, China	3 May 2014
European Leading	Anisya Kirdyapkina (RUS)	1:26:31	Taicang, China	3 May 2014

== Medalists ==
Gold	Elmira Alembekova; Russia
Silver	Lyudmyla Olyanovska; Ukraine
Bronze	Anežka Drahotová; Czech Republic

== Schedule ==
Date	Time	Round
14 August 2014	09:10	Final

All times are local times (UTC+2)

== Results ==
Rank	Name	Nationality	Time	Note
1st place, gold medalist(s)	Elmira Alembekova	Russia	1:27:56	
2nd place, silver medalist(s)	Lyudmyla Olyanovska	Ukraine	1:28:07	
3rd place, bronze medalist(s)	Anežka Drahotová	Czech Republic	1:28:08	NR
4	Vera Sokolova	Russia	1:28:24	
5	Eleonora Giorgi	Italy	1:28:28	
6	Ana Cabecinha	Portugal	1:28:40	
7	Antonella Palmisano	Italy	1:28:43	
8	Beatriz Pascual	Spain	1:29:02	SB
9	Hanna Drabenia	Belarus	1:29:39	PB
10	Raquel González	Spain	1:30:03	
11	Neringa Aidietytė	Lithuania	1:30:47	
12	Viktória Madarász	Hungary	1:30:57	PB
13	Inês Henriques	Portugal	1:31:32	
14	Agnieszka Dygacz	Poland	1:31:36	
15	Alina Matsviayuk	Belarus	1:31:46	
16	María José Poves	Spain	1:32:02	
17	Mária Gáliková	Slovakia	1:32:03	NR
18	Brigita Virbalytė-Dimšienė	Lithuania	1:32:46	
19	Laura Polli	Switzerland	1:33:22	PB
20	Despina Zapounidou	Greece	1:34:03	
21	Marie Polli	Switzerland	1:34:39	SB
22	Federica Curiazzi	Italy	1:35:48	PB
23	Inna Kashyna	Ukraine	1:35:51	
24	Antigoni Drisbioti	Greece	1:35:54	
25	Mária Czaková	Slovakia	1:38:38	
	Paulina Buziak	Poland	DNF	
	Lucie Pelantová	Czech Republic	DNF	
	Laura Reynolds	Ireland	DNF	
	Vasylyna Vitovchuk	Ukraine	DQ	
