= 2007 European Athletics U23 Championships – Women's 20 kilometres walk =

The women's 20 kilometres race walk event at the 2007 European Athletics U23 Championships was held in Debrecen, Hungary, on 13 July.

== Medalists ==
Gold	Tatyana Shemyakina; Russia
Silver	Svetlana Solovyova; Russia
Bronze	Olga Mikhaylova; Russia

== Results ==
=== Final ===
13 July

Rank	Name	Nationality	Time	Notes
1st place, gold medalist(s)	Tatyana Shemyakina	Russia	1:28:48	CR
2nd place, silver medalist(s)	Svetlana Solovyova	Russia	1:33:58	
3rd place, bronze medalist(s)	Olga Mikhaylova	Russia	1:34:41	
4	Katarzyna Kwoka	Poland	1:34:49	
5	Despina Zapounidou	Greece	1:35:42	
6	Zuzana Schindlerová	Czech Republic	1:36:04	
7	Jo Jackson	Great Britain	1:36:28	
8	Brigita Virbalytė	Lithuania	1:36:38	
9	Lucie Pelantová	Czech Republic	1:37:12	
10	Paulina Buziak	Poland	1:38:20	
11	Valentina Trapletti	Italy	1:38:45	
12	Maria Teresa Marinelli	Italy	1:38:58	
13	Agnieszka Dygacz	Poland	1:40:46	
14	Hanna Drabenia	Belarus	1:42:13	
15	Olga Yakovenko	Ukraine	1:42:24	
16	Fátima Rodrigues	Portugal	1:43:12	
17	Modra Ignate	Latvia	1:44:09	
18	Agnese Ragonesi	Italy	1:44:18	
19	Viktória Madarász	Hungary	1:44:41	
20	Mandy Loriou	France	1:45:14	
	Krisztina Kernács	Hungary	DQ	IAAF Rule 230.6
	Katalin Varró	Hungary	DQ	IAAF Rule 230.6
	Nastassia Yatsevich	Belarus	DQ	IAAF Rule 230.6

== Participation ==
According to an unofficial count, 23 athletes from 13 countries participated in the event.

- Belarus (2)
- Czech Republic (2)
- France (1)
- Great Britain (1)
- Greece (1)
- Hungary (3)
- Italy (3)
- Latvia (1)
- Lithuania (1)
- Poland (3)
- Portugal (1)
- Russia (3)
- Ukraine (1)
