= 2008 World Junior Championships in Athletics – Women's 10,000 metres walk =

The women's 10,000 metres walk event at the 2008 World Junior Championships in Athletics was held in Bydgoszcz, Poland, at Zawisza Stadium on 9 July.

== Medalists ==
Gold	Tatyana Mineyeva; Russia
Silver	Elmira Alembekova; Russia
Bronze	Li Yanfei; China

== Results ==
=== Final ===
9 July

Rank	Name	Nationality	Time	Notes
1st place, gold medalist(s)	Tatyana Mineyeva	Russia	43:24.72	
2nd place, silver medalist(s)	Elmira Alembekova	Russia	43:45.16	
3rd place, bronze medalist(s)	Li Yanfei	China	44:24.10	
4	Jess Rothwell	Australia	44:44.22	
5	Anamaria Greceanu	Romania	45:53.50	
6	Júlia Takács	Spain	45:58.29	
7	Won Seas-Byeol	South Korea	46:08.65	
8	Kumiko Okada	Japan	46:10.26	
9	Antonella Palmisano	Italy	46:22.72	
10	Adriana Turnea	Romania	46:28.51	
11	Yu Miao	China	46:40.92	
12	Anlly Pineda	Colombia	47:22.11	
13	Erandi Uribe	Mexico	47:22.14	
14	Anna Chernenko	Ukraine	47:25.18	
15	Maria Rayo	Colombia	47:35.48	
16	Panagióta Tsinopoúlou	Greece	47:46.50	
17	Nadzeya Darazhuk	Belarus	47:55.91	
18	Eleonora Giorgi	Italy	47:58.68	
19	Ayman Kozhakhmetova	Kazakhstan	48:07.14	
20	Tegist Bedilu	Ethiopia	48:29.93	
21	Raquel González	Spain	48:53.69	
22	Adriana Ochoa	Mexico	49:05.42	
23	Laurene Delon	France	49:27.33	
24	Berta Kriván	Hungary	49:43.68	
25	Sholpan Kozhakhmetova	Kazakhstan	50:01.21	
26	Melissa Hayes	Australia	50:38.35	
27	Catarina Godinho	Portugal	50:46.04	
28	Anita Kažemaka	Latvia	50:53.59	
29	Liga Brokere	Latvia	50:54.16	
30	Laura Reynolds	Ireland	51:58.15	
	Bekashign Aynalem	Ethiopia	DQ	
	Ana Conceição	Portugal	DQ	
	Claudia Cornejo	Bolivia	DNF	

== Participation ==
According to an unofficial count, 33 athletes from 21 countries participated in the event.

- Australia (2)
- Belarus (1)
- Bolivia (1)
- China (2)
- Colombia (2)
- Ethiopia (2)
- France (1)
- Greece (1)
- Hungary (1)
- Ireland (1)
- Italy (2)
- Japan (1)
- Kazakhstan (2)
- Latvia (2)
- Mexico (2)
- Portugal (2)
- Romania (2)
- Russia (2)
- South Korea (1)
- Spain (2)
- Ukraine (1)
