= 2010 European Athletics Championships – Women's 20 kilometres walk =

Women's 20 kilometres walk at the European Athletics Championships

The women's 20 kilometres walk at the 2010 European Athletics Championships was held on the streets of Barcelona on 28 July.

== Medalists ==
Gold	Anisya Kirdyapkina; Russia (RUS)
Silver	Vera Sokolova; Russia (RUS)
Bronze	Melanie Seeger; Germany (GER)

== Records ==
Standing records prior to the 2010 European Athletics Championships
World record	Olimpiada Ivanova (RUS)	1:25:41	Helsinki, Finland	7 August 2005
European record	Olimpiada Ivanova (RUS)	1:25:41	Helsinki, Finland	7 August 2005
Championship record	Olimpiada Ivanova (RUS)	1:26:42	Munich, Germany	7 August 2002
World Leading	Anisya Kirdyapkina (RUS)	1:25:11	Sochi, Russia	20 February 2010
European Leading	Anisya Kirdyapkina (RUS)	1:25:11	Sochi, Russia	20 February 2010

== Schedule ==
Date	Time	Round
28 July 2010	8:05	Final

== Results ==
=== Final ===
Rank	Athlete	Nationality	Time	Notes
DQ	Olga Kaniskina	Russia	~~1:27:44~~	~~SB~~, Doping
1st place, gold medalist(s)	Anisya Kirdyapkina	Russia	1:28:55	
2nd place, silver medalist(s)	Vera Sokolova	Russia	1:29:32	
3rd place, bronze medalist(s)	Melanie Seeger	Germany	1:29:43	
4	Beatriz Pascual	Spain	1:29:52	
5	Vera Santos	Portugal	1:30:52	
6	Kristina Saltanovič	Lithuania	1:31:40	SB
7	Ana Cabecinha	Portugal	1:31:48	
8	Inês Henriques	Portugal	1:32:26	
9	Jo Jackson	Great Britain & N.I.	1:33:33	
10	María José Poves	Spain	1:34:19	
11	Agnieszka Dygacz	Poland	1:34:51	
12	Brigita Virbalytė-Dimšienė	Lithuania	1:35:00	
13	Nastassia Yatsevich	Belarus	1:36:59	
14	Neringa Aidietytė	Lithuania	1:37:32	
15	Lucie Pelantová	Czech Republic	1:41:35	
	Olive Loughnane	Ireland		DNF
	Zuzana Malíková	Slovakia		DNF
	Alina Matveyuk	Belarus		DNF
	María Vasco	Spain		DNF
	Paulina Buziak	Poland		DQ
	Sibilla Di Vincenzo	Italy		DQ
