= Neringa Aidietytė =

Lithuanian racewalker (born 1983)

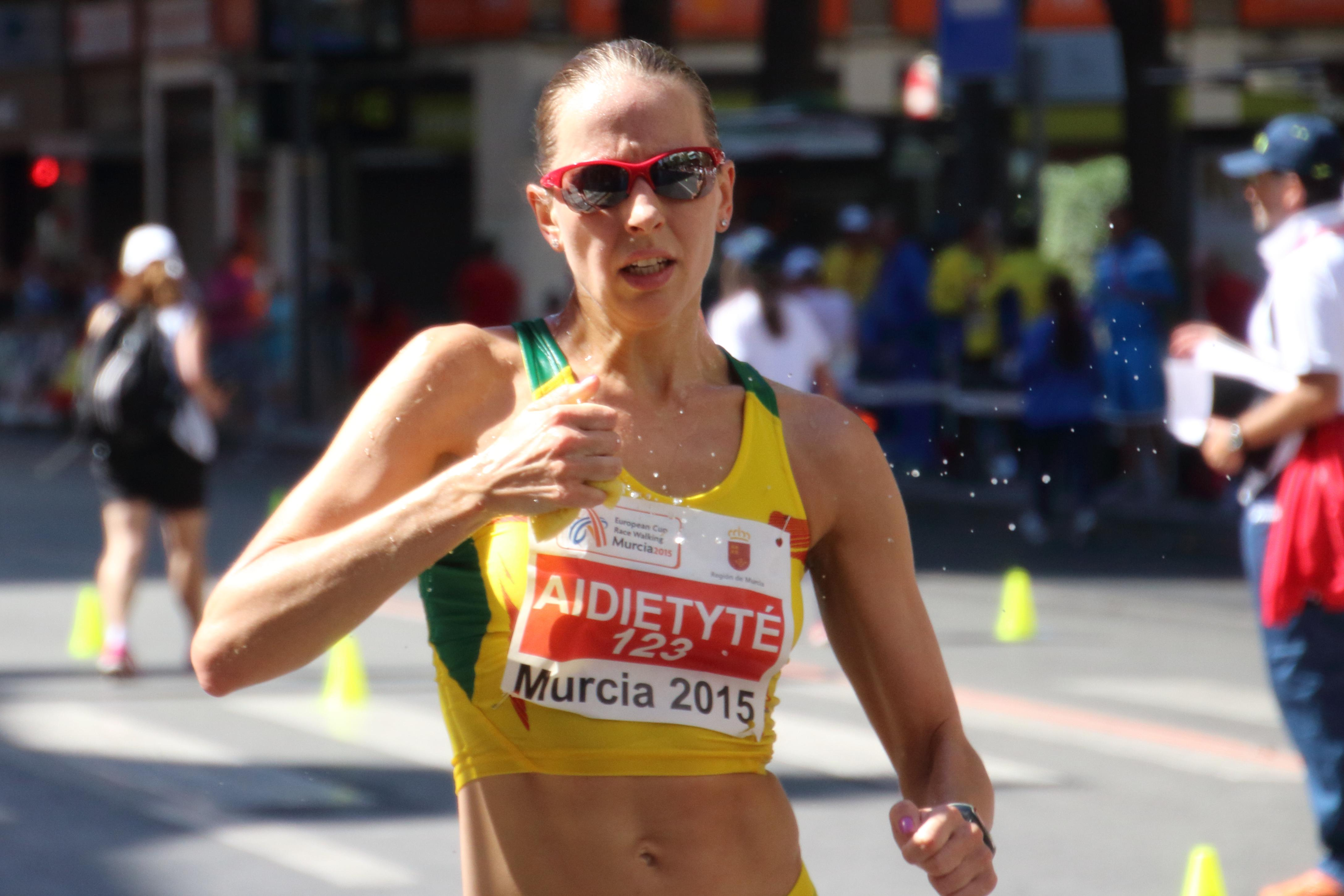
- European Cup Race Walking 2015 (Murcia, Spain).

Personal information
- Born: June 5, 1983 (age 43)
- Height: 1.77 m (5 ft 9 1/2 in)
- Weight: 61 kg (134 lb)

Sport
- Country: Lithuania
- Sport: Athletics
- Event: 20km Race Walk

Neringa Aidietytė (born 5 June, 1983) is a Lithuanian racewalker, who competes in the 20 km walking event. Her personal record is 1:29:01, reached in 2014. She represented Lithuania at the 2010 and 2014 European Championships in Athletics, 2011 and 2013 World Championship in Athletics and the 2012 London Olympic Games.

== Achievements ==
Year	Competition	Venue	Position	Event	Notes
Representing Lithuania
2004	World Race Walking Cup	Naumburg, Germany	69th	20 km	1:42:42
2005	European U23 Championships	Erfurt, Germany	7th	20 km	1:42:32
2006	World Race Walking Cup	A Coruña, Spain	—	20 km	DNF
2007	Universiade	Bangkok, Thailand	5th	20 km	1:38:57
2008	World Race Walking Cup	Cheboksary, Russia	32nd	20 km	1:35:10
2009	European Race Walking Cup	Metz, France	—	20 km	DNF
2009	Universiade	Belgrade, Serbia	—	20 km	DQ
2010	European Championships	Barcelona, Spain	15th	20 km	1:37:32
2011	European Race Walking Cup	Olhão, Portugal	23rd	20 km	1:36:55
2011	World Championships	Daegu, South Korea	—	20 km	DQ
2012	World Race Walking Cup	Saransk, Russia	53rd	20 km	1:39:34
2012	Olympic Games	London, United Kingdom	39th	20 km	1:34:01
2013	European Race Walking Cup	Dudince, Slovakia	—	20 km	DNF
2013	World Championships	Moscow, Russia	40th	20 km	1:34:32
2014	World Race Walking Cup	Taicang, China	23rd	20 km	1:29:37
2014	European Championships	Zürich, Switzerland	11th	20 km	1:30:47
2015	European Race Walking Cup	Murcia, Spain	12th	20 km	1:30:20
2015	World Championships	Beijing, China	—	20 km	DQ
