= Despina Zapounidou =

Greek race walker

Personal information
- Born: 5 October 1985 (age 40)

Sport
- Country: Greece
- Sport: Athletics
- Event: 20 km walk

Achievements and titles
- Personal bests: 3 km walk (i): 12:35.16; 10 km walk: 42:55.82 NR; 20 km walk: 1:31.08

Despina Zapounidou (Greek: Δέσποινα Ζαπουνίδου; born 5 October 1985 in Thessaloniki) is a Greek race walker. She competed in the 20 kilometres event at the 2008 Summer Olympics and the 2012 Summer Olympics. She holds two Greek records: 1:37:40.59 hours for the 20,000 m track walk and 12:35.16 minutes for the 3000 m indoor walk.

As a junior athlete, she was 12th in the 10,000 m track walk at the 2004 World Junior Championships in Athletics and fifth in the 10 km road walk at the 2004 IAAF World Race Walking Cup. She entered the senior 20 km event at the 2006 and 2008 Race Walking Cup but failed to finish on both occasions. She also failed to finish at the 2005 Universiade and the 2013 European Race Walking Cup.

From 2017 to 2021, Zapounidou served a four-year competition ban for violating anti-doping regulations.

== Competition record ==
Year	Competition	Venue	Position	Event	Notes
Representing Greece
2004	World Race Walking Cup (U20)	Naumburg, Germany	5th	10 km	49:00
2004	World Junior Championships	Grosseto, Italy	12th	10,000m	49:18.93
2006	World Race Walking Cup	A Coruña, Spain	—	20 km	DNF
2007	European U23 Championships	Debrecen, Hungary	5th	20 km walk	1:35:42
2008	World Race Walking Cup	Cheboksary, Russia	—	20 km	DNF
2008	Olympic Games	Beijing, China	40th	20 km walk	1:39:11
2012	Olympic Games	London, United Kingdom	44th	20 km walk	1:35.19
2013	European Race Walking Cup	Dudince, Slovakia	—	20 km	DNF
2014	European Championships	Zurich, Switzerland	20th	20 km walk	1:34.03
