= 2005 European Athletics U23 Championships – Women's 20 kilometres walk =

The women's 20 kilometres race walk event at the 2005 European Athletics U23 Championships was held in Erfurt, Germany, on 15 July.

== Medalists ==
| Gold | Irina Petrova; Russia |
| Silver | Olga Kaniskina; Russia |
| Bronze | Barbora Dibelková; Czech Republic |

== Results ==
=== Final ===
15 July

| Rank | Name | Nationality | Time | Notes |
|---|---|---|---|---|
| 1st place, gold medalist(s) | Irina Petrova | Russia | 1:33:24 | |
| 2nd place, silver medalist(s) | Olga Kaniskina | Russia | 1:33:33 | |
| 3rd place, bronze medalist(s) | Barbora Dibelková | Czech Republic | 1:34:44 | |
| 4 | Ana Cabecinha | Portugal | 1:36:13 | |
| 5 | Zuzana Malíková | Slovakia | 1:38:32 | |
| 6 | Nastassia Yatsevich | Belarus | 1:40:43 | |
| 7 | Neringa Aidietytė | Lithuania | 1:42:32 | |
| 8 | Sniazhana Yurchanka | Belarus | 1:43:10 | |
| 9 | Maja Landmann | Germany | 1:44:54 | |
| 10 | Tatyana Gabellone | Italy | 1:46:36 | |
| 11 | Laura Polli | Switzerland | 1:48:45 | |
| 12 | Agnese Ragonesi | Italy | 1:49:52 | |
| 13 | Mandy Loriou | France | 1:52:02 | |
| 14 | Agnieszka Dygacz | Poland | 1:53:09 | |
| 15 | Katarzyna Kwoka | Poland | 1:55:30 | |
| 16 | Dóra Nemere | Hungary | 1:57:21 | |
| 17 | Beata Bodzioch | Poland | 1:59:04 | |
| | Sibilla Di Vincenzo | Italy | DQ | IAAF rule 230.4 |

== Participation ==
According to an unofficial count, 18 athletes from 12 countries participated in the event.

- Belarus (2)
- Czech Republic (1)
- France (1)
- Germany (1)
- Hungary (1)
- Italy (3)
- Lithuania (1)
- Poland (3)
- Portugal (1)
- Russia (2)
- Slovakia (1)
- Switzerland (1)
