= Kristina Saltanovič =

Lithuanian race walker (born 1975)

Personal information
- Born: 20 February 1975 (age 51) Vilnius, Lithuanian SSR, Soviet Union
- Height: 1.64 m (5 ft 4 1/2 in)
- Weight: 53 kg (117 lb)

Sport
- Country: Lithuania
- Sport: Athletics
- Event: 20km race walk

Kristina Saltanovič (born 20 February 1975) is a Lithuanian race walker. She lives in Lisbon, Portugal.

== Achievements ==
Year	Competition	Venue	Position	Event	Notes
Representing Lithuania
1995	World Race Walking Cup	Beijing, China	67th	10 km	48:37
1996	European Race Walking Cup	A Coruña, Spain	—	10 km	DNF
1997	World Race Walking Cup	Poděbrady, Czech Republic	65th	10 km	47:31
1998	European Race Walking Cup	Dudince, Slovakia	31st	10 km	46:38
1999	World Race Walking Cup	Mézidon-Canon, France	28th	20 km	1:34:03
1999	World Championships	Seville, Spain	18th	20 km	1:35:51
2000	European Race Walking Cup	Eisenhüttenstadt, Germany	19th	20 km	1:32:48
2000	Olympic Games	Sydney, Australia	16th	20 km	1:34:24
2001	European Race Walking Cup	Dudince, Slovakia	—	20 km	DNF
2002	Lithuanian Championships	Kaunas, Lithuania	1st	20 km	1:32:49
2002	European Championships	Munich, Germany	7th	20 km	1:30:44
2002	World Race Walking Cup	Turin, Italy	18th	20 km	1:34:26
2003	European Race Walking Cup	Cheboksary, Russia	20th	20 km	1:33:12
2003	World Championships	Paris, France	14th	20 km	1:32:13
2004	World Race Walking Cup	Naumburg, Germany	27th	20 km	1:31:54
2004	Olympic Games	Athens, Greece	19th	20 km	1:32:22
2005	European Race Walking Cup	Miskolc, Hungary	14th	20 km	1:33:15
2005	World Championships	Helsinki, Finland	12th	20 km	1:31:23
2006	World Race Walking Cup	A Coruña, Spain	19th	20 km	1:32:08
2006	European Championships	Gothenburg, Sweden	—	20 km	DNF
2008	World Race Walking Cup	Cheboksary, Russia	17th	20 km	1:31:21
2008	Olympic Games	Beijing, China	18th	20 km	1:31:03
2009	European Race Walking Cup	Metz, France	3rd	20 km	1:34:17
2009	World Championships	Berlin, Germany	8th	20 km	1:31:23
2010	World Race Walking Cup	Chihuahua, Mexico	12th	20 km	1:36:28
2010	European Championships	Barcelona, Spain	7th	20 km	1:31:40
2011	European Race Walking Cup	Olhão, Portugal	—	20 km	DNF
2011	World Championships	Daegu, South Korea	8th	20 km	1:31:40
2012	World Race Walking Cup	Saransk, Russia	27th	20 km	1:35:32
2012	Olympic Games	London, United Kingdom	21st	20 km	1:31:04
2013	European Race Walking Cup	Dudince, Slovakia	—	20 km	DNF
2013	World Championships	Moscow, Russia	21st	20 km	1:32:11
2014	World Race Walking Cup	Taicang, China	43rd	20 km	1:32:58
2015	European Race Walking Cup	Murcia, Spain	—	20 km	DNF
