= Agnieszka Dygacz =

Polish race walker (born 1985)

Agnieszka Dygacz (born 18 July 1985 in Chorzów) is a Polish race walker. She competed in the 20 km kilometres event at the 2012 Summer Olympics.

== Competition record ==
Year	Competition	Venue	Position	Event	Notes
Representing Poland
2004	World Race Walking Cup	Naumburg, Germany	6th	10 km walk	49:15
2005	European Race Walking Cup	Miskolc, Hungary	43rd	20 km walk	1:50:06
2005	European U23 Championships	Erfurt, Germany	14th	20 km walk	1:53:09
2007	European Race Walking Cup	Royal Leamington Spa, United Kingdom	37th	20 km walk	1:38:30
2007	European U23 Championships	Debrecen, Hungary	13th	20 km walk	1:40:46
2008	World Race Walking Cup	Cheboksary, Russia	29th	20 km walk	1:34:27
2009	European Race Walking Cup	Metz, France	–	20 km walk	DNF
2009	Universiade	Belgrade, Serbia	11th	20 km walk	1:39:00
2009	World Championships	Berlin, Germany	28th	20 km walk	1:38:36
2010	World Race Walking Cup	Chihuahua, Mexico	39th	20 km walk	1:45:24
2010	European Championships	Barcelona, Spain	12th	20 km walk	1:34:51
2011	European Race Walking Cup	Olhão, Portugal	31st	20 km walk	1:39:16
2012	World Race Walking Cup	Saransk, Russia	–	20 km walk	DNF
2012	Olympic Games	London, United Kingdom	23rd	20 km walk	1:31:28
2013	European Race Walking Cup	Dudince, Slovakia	–	20 km walk	DNF
2013	World Championships	Moscow, Russia	43rd	20 km walk	1:34:42
2014	World Race Walking Cup	Taicang, China	18th	20 km walk	1:28:58
2014	European Championships	Zürich, Switzerland	14th	20 km walk	1:31:36
2015	European Race Walking Cup	Murcia, Spain	–	20 km	DNF
2015	World Championships	Beijing, China	38th	20 km walk	1:39:06
