= Paulina Buziak-Śmiatacz =

Polish racewalker (born 1986)

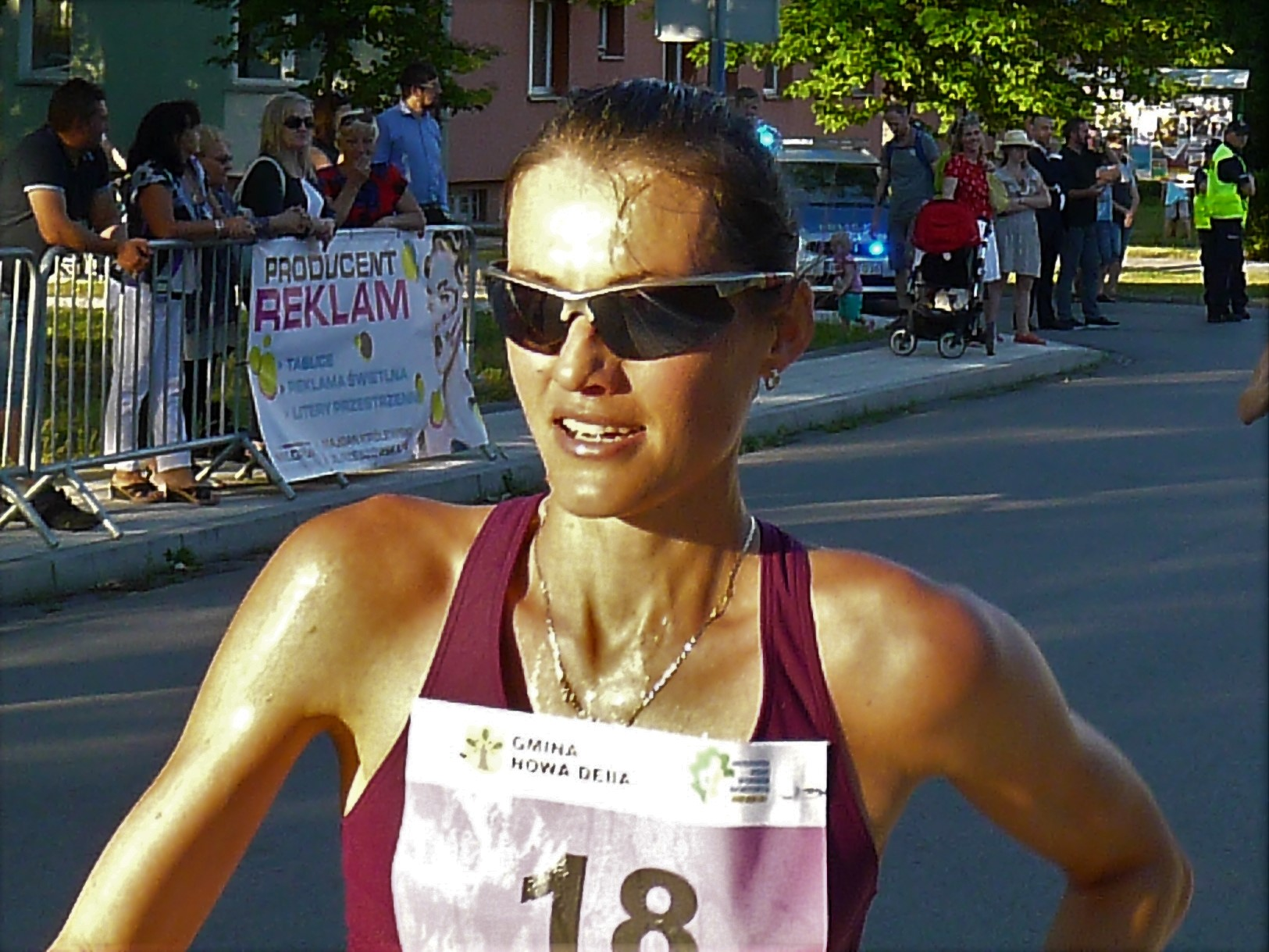
Paulina Buziak (2017)

Paulina Buziak-Śmiatacz (born 16 December 1986 in Mielec) is a Polish race walker. She competed in the 20 km kilometres event at the 2012 Summer Olympics.

== Competition record ==
Year	Competition	Venue	Position	Event	Notes
Representing Poland
2003	World Youth Championships	Sherbrooke, Canada	4th	5000 m walk	50:52.96
2005	European Race Walking Cup	Miskolc, Hungary	14th	10 km walk	50:38
2005	European Junior Championships	Hengelo, Netherlands	10th	10,000 m walk	50:52.96
2007	European Race Walking Cup	Royal Leamington Spa, United Kingdom	42nd	20 km walk	1:40:55
2007	European U23 Championships	Debrecen, Hungary	10th	20 km walk	1:38:20
2008	World Race Walking Cup	Cheboksary, Russia	49th	20 km walk	1:39:01
2009	European Race Walking Cup	Metz, France	16th	20 km walk	1:39:23
2010	European Championships	Barcelona, Spain	–	20 km walk	DQ
2011	European Race Walking Cup	Olhao, Portugal	40th	20 km walk	1:42:19
2012	World Race Walking Cup	Saransk, Russia	31st	20 km walk	1:36:17
2012	Olympic Games	London, United Kingdom	45th	20 km walk	1:35:23
2013	European Race Walking Cup	Dudince, Slovakia	19th	20 km walk	1:35:53
2013	World Championships	Moscow, Russia	47th	20 km walk	1:33:30
2014	World Race Walking Cup	Taicang, China	47th	20 km walk	1:33:50
2014	European Championships	Zürich, Switzerland	–	20 km walk	DNF
2015	European Race Walking Cup	Murcia, Spain	22nd	20 km walk	1:33:42
2016	Olympic Games	Rio de Janeiro, Brazil	28th	20 km walk	1:35:01
