= 2006 World Junior Championships in Athletics – Women's 10,000 metres walk =

The women's 10,000 metres walk event at the 2006 World Junior Championships in Athletics was held in Beijing, China, at Chaoyang Sports Centre on 19 August.

== Medalists ==
Gold	Liu Hong; China
Silver	Tatyana Shemyakina; Russia
Bronze	Anamaria Greceanu; Romania

== Results ==
=== Final ===
19 August

Rank	Name	Nationality	Time	Notes
1st place, gold medalist(s)	Liu Hong	China	45:12.84	
2nd place, silver medalist(s)	Tatyana Shemyakina	Russia	45:34.41	
3rd place, bronze medalist(s)	Anamaria Greceanu	Romania	46:45.67	
4	Vera Sokolova	Russia	46:58.21	
5	Volha Mazuronak	Belarus	47:37.11	
6	Chai Xue	China	48:09.51	
7	Federica Ferraro	Italy	49:17.53	
8	Fumika Kiryu	Japan	49:20.35	
9	Lorena Castrillo	Spain	50:46.34	
10	Federica Menzato	Italy	51:01.60	
11	Anlly Pineda	Colombia	51:54.48	
12	Svetlana Vavilova	Ukraine	52:17.36	
13	Klara Malikova	Slovakia	52:29.94	
14	Ingrid Hernández	Colombia	52:37.36	
15	Narim Kahraman	Turkey	52:52.28	
16	Karoliina Kaasalainen	Finland	53:05.09	
17	Yuliya Davydenko	Ukraine	53:09.65	
18	Catherine Hayes	United States	55:19.64	
19	Cecilia Kardos	Hungary	57:23.21	
20	Spyridoula Stavrou	Greece	58:34.23	
	Claudia Cornejo	Bolivia	DQ	
	Tanya Holliday	Australia	DQ	
	Won Seas-Byeol	South Korea	DQ	
	Anna Drabenya	Belarus	DQ	
	Catarina Godinho	Portugal	DNF	

== Participation ==
According to an unofficial count, 25 athletes from 19 countries participated in the event.

- Australia (1)
- Belarus (2)
- Bolivia (1)
- China (2)
- Colombia (2)
- Finland (1)
- Greece (1)
- Hungary (1)
- Italy (2)
- Japan (1)
- Portugal (1)
- Romania (1)
- Russia (2)
- Slovakia (1)
- South Korea (1)
- Spain (1)
- Turkey (1)
- Ukraine (2)
- United States (1)
