= Ana Cabecinha =

Portuguese race walker

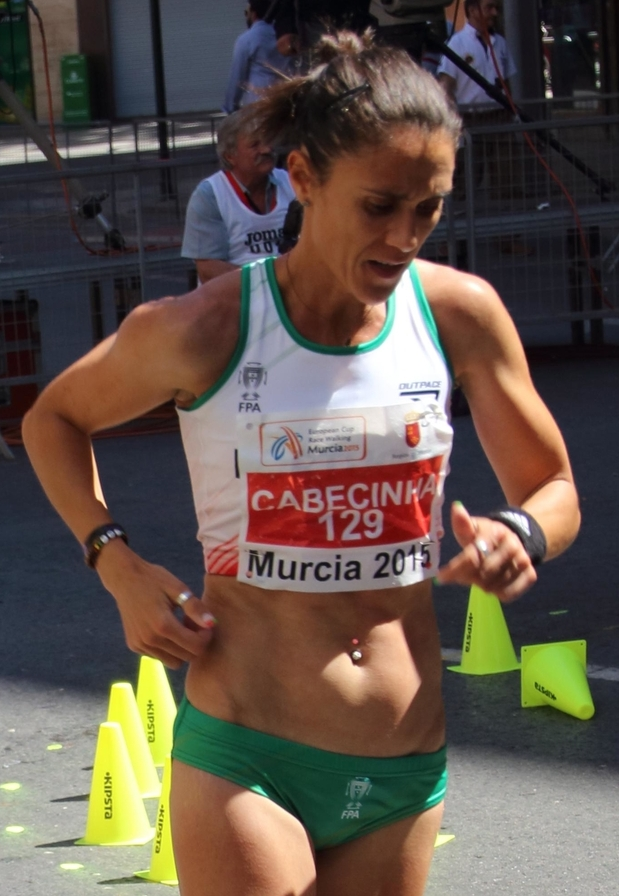
- Cabecinha in 2015

Personal information
- Full name: Ana Isabel Vermelhudo Cabecinha
- Born: 29 April 1984 (age 42) Santiago Maior, Portugal
- Height: 1.64 m (5 ft 5 in)
- Weight: 48 kg (106 lb)

Sport
- Country: Portugal
- Sport: Athletics
- Event: 20km Race Walk

Ana Isabel Vermelhudo Cabecinha (born 29 April 1984) is a Portuguese race walker. She was born in Santiago Maior (Beja).

On 16 February 2013 the athlete broke the national indoor 3000-metre record with a time of 12 minutes, 21.56 seconds.

== Achievements ==
Year	Competition	Venue	Position	Event	Notes
Representing Portugal
2001	World Youth Championships	Debrecen, Hungary	10th	5000 m	24:35.72
2002	World Junior Championships	Kingston, Jamaica	12th	10,000 m	48:57.61
2003	European Junior Championships	Tampere, Finland	3rd	10,000 m	47:36.15
2004	World Race Walking Cup	Naumburg, Germany	56th	20 km	1:37:39
2005	European U23 Championships	Erfurt, Germany	4th	20 km	1:36:13
2006	World Race Walking Cup	A Coruña, Spain	14th	20 km	1:31:02
2008	World Race Walking Cup	Cheboksary, Russia	11th	20 km	1:29:39
2008	Olympic Games	Beijing, China	8th	20 km	1:27:46
2009	European Race Walking Cup	Metz, France	13th	20 km	1:38:01
2010	World Race Walking Cup	Chihuahua, Mexico	8th	20 km	1:34:57
2010	Ibero-American Championships	San Fernando, Spain	1st	10,000 m	43:31.21
2010	European Championships	Barcelona, Spain	8th	20 km	1:31:48
2011	European Race Walking Cup	Olhão, Portugal	15th	20 km	1:34:31
2011	World Championships	Daegu, South Korea	7th	20 km	1:31:36
2012	World Race Walking Cup	Saransk, Russia	9th	20 km	1:31:42
2012	Olympic Games	London, United Kingdom	9th	20 km	1:28:03
2013	European Race Walking Cup	Dudince, Slovakia	5th	20 km	1:31:48
2013	European Race Walking Cup	Dudince, Slovakia	2nd	Team - 20 km	23 pts
2013	World Championships	Moscow, Russia	8th	20 km	1:29:17
2014	World Race Walking Cup	Taicang, China	8th	20 km	1:27:49
2014	European Athletics Championship	Zurich, Switzerland	6th	20 km	1:28:40
2015	European Race Walking Cup	Murcia, Spain	9th	20 km	1:28:28
2015	European Race Walking Cup	Murcia, Spain	3rd	Team - 20 km	38 pts
2015	World Championships	Beijing, China	4th	20 km	1:29:29
2017	World Championships	London, United Kingdom	6th	20 km	1:28:57
2022	Ibero-American Championships	La Nucía, Spain	3rd	10,000 m	44:23.69
