= Viktória Madarász =

Hungarian race walker

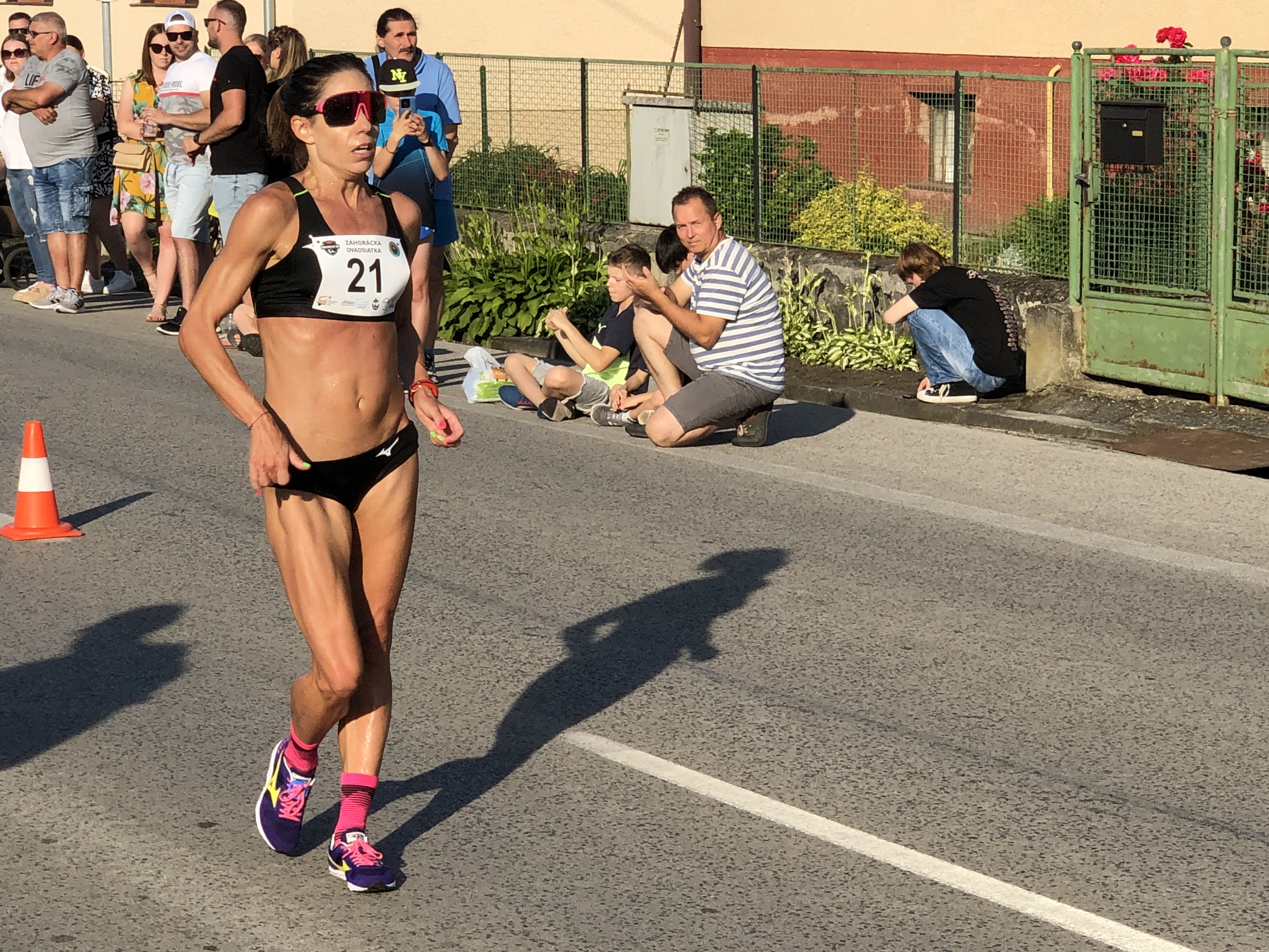

Personal information
- National team: Hungary
- Born: 12 May 1985 (age 41)

Sport
- Sport: Race walking
Medal record
Women's athletics
Representing Hungary
European Championships
Bronze medal – third place	Munich 2022	35 km walk

Viktória Madarász (born 12 May 1985 in Budapest) is a Hungarian race walker. She competed in the 20 kilometres (12 mi) km event at the 2012 Summer Olympics.

In April 2026, Madarász was issued with a four-year ban backdated to May 2025 by the Athletics Integrity Unit for an anti-doping rule violation relating to irregularities in her athlete biological passport.

== Competition record ==
Year	Competition	Venue	Position	Event	Notes
Representing Hungary
2004	World Junior Championships	Grosseto, Italy	27th (h)	3000 m s'chase	11:05.55
2006	World Race Walking Cup	A Coruña, Spain	68th	20 km walk	1:50:56
2007	European U23 Championships	Debrecen, Hungary	19th	20 km walk	1:44:41
2008	World Race Walking Cup	Cheboksary, Russia	–	20 km walk	DNF
2011	European Race Walking Cup	Olhao, Portugal	42nd	20 km walk	1:45:02
2011	World Championships	Daegu, South Korea	–	20 km walk	DQ
2012	World Race Walking Cup	Saransk, Russia	80th	20 km walk	1:49:05
2012	Olympic Games	London, United Kingdom	41st	20 km walk	1:34:48
2013	European Race Walking Cup	Dudince, Slovakia	35th	20 km walk	1:40:50
2013	World Championships	Moscow, Russia	36th	20 km walk	1:34:10
2014	European Championships	Zürich, Switzerland	12th	20 km walk	1:30:57
2015	World Championships	Beijing, China	15th	20 km walk	1:32:01
