= 2004 World Junior Championships in Athletics – Women's 10,000 metres walk =

Women's World Junior Championships 2004, Grosseto, Italy

The women's 10,000 metres walk event at the 2004 World Junior Championships in Athletics was held in Grosseto, Italy, at Stadio Olimpico Carlo Zecchini on 16 July.

== Medalists ==
Gold	Irina Petrova; Russia
Silver	Zhang Nan; China
Bronze	Vera Sokolova; Russia

== Results ==
=== Final ===
16 July

Rank	Name	Nationality	Time	Notes
1st place, gold medalist(s)	Irina Petrova	Russia	45:50.39	
2nd place, silver medalist(s)	Zhang Nan	China	45:58.54	
3rd place, bronze medalist(s)	Vera Sokolova	Russia	46:53.02	
4	Fumi Mitsumura	Japan	47:10.89	
5	Liu Xiaoyan	China	47:57.62	
6	Sumiko Suzuki	Japan	48:00.24	
7	Agnese Ragonesi	Italy	48:00.69	
8	Maja Landmann	Germany	48:16.48	
9	Brigita Virbalyté	Lithuania	48:51.25	
10	Mandy Loriou	France	49:03.35	
11	Valentina Trapletti	Italy	49:06.52	
12	Déspina Zapounídou	Greece	49:18.93	
13	Ann Loughnane	Ireland	49:24.89	
14	Megan Huzzey	Canada	49:25.50	
15	Lisa Grant	Australia	49:32.54	
16	Johana Ordóñez	Ecuador	50:05.95	
17	Eva María Iglesias	Spain	50:27.82	
18	Eszter Gerendási	Hungary	50:34.85	
19	Anastasiya Kuznyetsova	Ukraine	50:46.30	
20	Ivett Erdös	Hungary	50:58.95	
21	Amanda Gorst	New Zealand	51:02.74	
22	Maria Michta	United States	51:42.95	
23	Jheny Llactahuaman	Peru	51:55.67	
24	Yadira Guamán	Ecuador	52:07.82	
25	Catherine Hayes	United States	52:27.15	
26	Narim Saglam	Turkey	53:01.80	
27	Caitriona McMahon	Ireland	54:38.19	
	Yelena Rusak	Belarus	DQ	IAAF rule 230.4b
	Tatevik Petrosyan	Armenia	DNF	

== Participation ==
According to an unofficial count, 29 athletes from 21 countries participated in the event.

- Armenia (1)
- Australia (1)
- Belarus (1)
- Canada (1)
- China (2)
- Ecuador (2)
- France (1)
- Germany (1)
- Greece (1)
- Hungary (2)
- Ireland (2)
- Italy (2)
- Japan (2)
- Lithuania (1)
- New Zealand (1)
- Peru (1)
- Russia (2)
- Spain (1)
- Turkey (1)
- Ukraine (1)
- United States (2)
