= Athletics at the 2009 Summer Universiade – Women's 20 kilometres walk =

The men's 20 kilometres walk event at the 2009 Summer Universiade was held on 9 July.

== Results ==
Rank	Name	Nationality	Time	Notes
1st place, gold medalist(s)	Olga Mikhailova	Russia	1:30:43	GR
2nd place, silver medalist(s)	Masumi Fuchise	Japan	1:31:42	
3rd place, bronze medalist(s)	Olga Povalyaeva	Russia	1:33:58	
4	Evangelia Ksinou	Greece	1:34:48	
5	Cisiane Lopes	Brazil	1:36:07	
6	Valentina Trapletti	Italy	1:36:32	PB
7	Lucie Pelantová	Czech Republic	1:36:51	
8	Rachel Lavallee	Canada	1:37:22	
9	Lorena Luaces	Spain	1:38:01	
10	Ainhoa Pinedo	Spain	1:38:23	
11	Agnieszka Dygacz	Poland	1:39:00	
12	Ana Veronica Rodean	Romania	1:39:55	
13	Alessandra Picagevitcz	Brazil	1:40:20	
14	Galina Kichigina	Kazakhstan	1:40:45	
15	Johana Ordóñez	Ecuador	1:43:01	
16	Meliha Mulahalilović	Bosnia and Herzegovina	1:58:34	
	Neringa Aidietytė	Lithuania	DQ	
	Jillian Hosking	Australia	DQ	
	Layegha Hashemi	Afghanistan	DNS	
