= Vera Sokolova =

Russian race walker (born 1987)

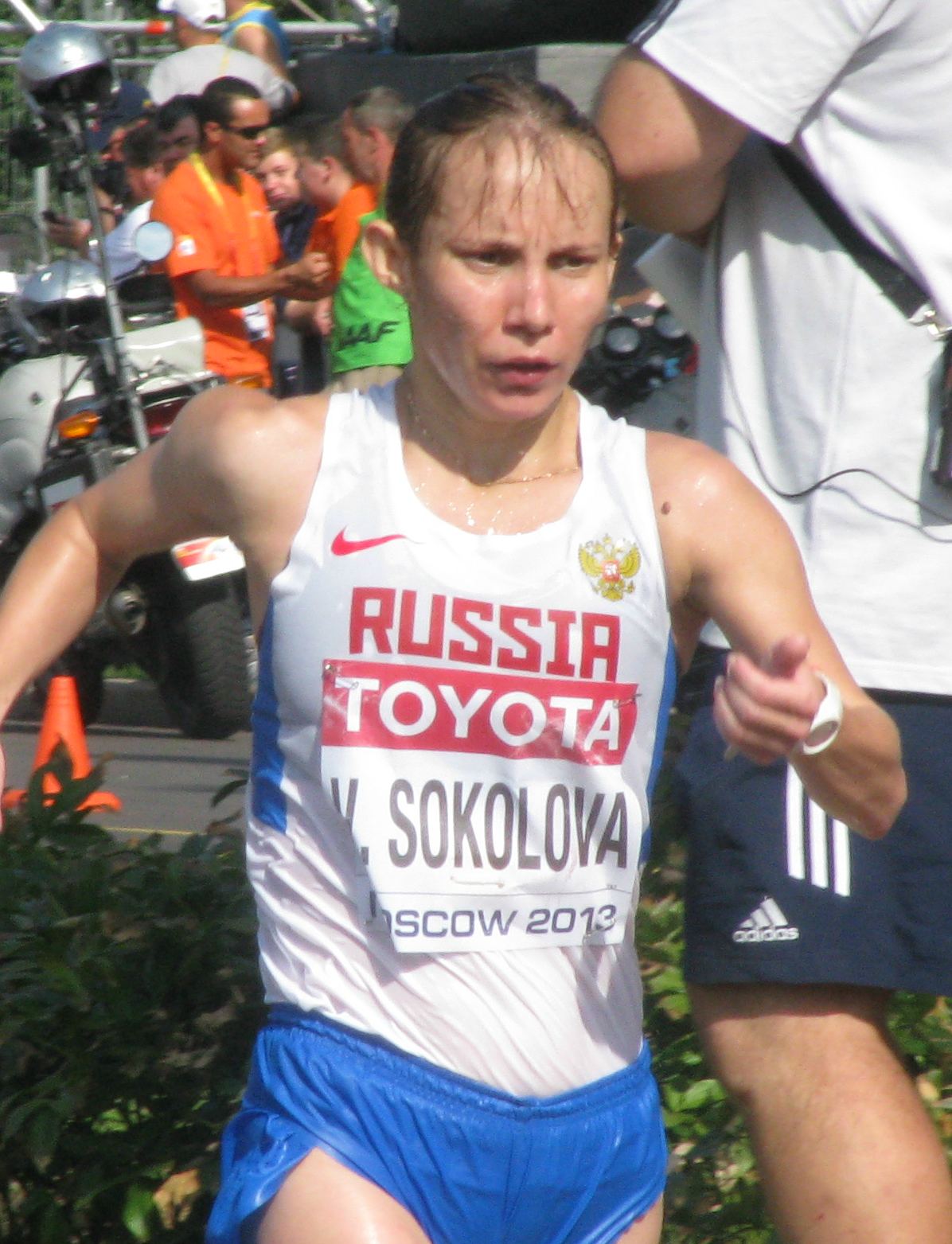
Vera Sokolova (2013)

Vera Aleksandrovna Sokolova (Russian: Вера Александровна Соколова; born June 8, 1987, in Solianoy, Morgaushsky District, Chuvash Republic) is a Russian race walker.

A gold medalist on the track at World Youth and European Junior level, she won her first major senior medal at the 2010 European Athletics Championships, taking the 20 km road walk bronze medal. She also represented Russia at the 2009 World Championships in Athletics.

She won the 2011 Russian Winter Walking Championships in Sochi with a world record in the 20 km road walk of 1:25:08, knocking 33 seconds off the former record set by Olimpiada Ivanova in the 2005 World Championships final. She continues to be coached by Viktor Chegin, after he has been suspended for a lengthy series of performance-enhancing drug suspensions against many of his athletes.

== Doping case ==
In September 2015 IAAF confirmed that Sokolova was provisionally suspended after a sample from an out-of-competition control in Saransk in June had been found positive for a prohibited substance.

== Achievements ==
Year	Competition	Venue	Position	Event	Notes
Representing Russia
2002	World Junior Championships	Kingston, Jamaica	9th	10,000 m track walk	47:59.14
2003	European Race Walking Cup (U20)	Cheboksary, Russia	2nd	10 km	47:02
2003	European Race Walking Cup (U20)	Cheboksary, Russia	1st	Team - 10 km Junior	3 pts
2003	World Youth Championships	Sherbrooke, Canada	1st	5000 m track walk	22:50.23
2004	World Race Walking Cup (U20)	Naumburg, Germany	1st	10 km	45:29
2004	World Junior Championships	Grosseto, Italy	3rd	10,000 m track walk	46:53.02
2005	European Race Walking Cup (U20)	Miskolc, Hungary	1st	10 km	44:09
2005	European Race Walking Cup (U20)	Miskolc, Hungary	1st	Team - 10 km Junior	3 pts
2005	European Junior Championships	Kaunas, Lithuania	1st	10,000 m track walk	43:11.34
2006	World Race Walking Cup (U20)	A Coruña, Spain	1st	10 km	44:49
2006	World Junior Championships	Beijing, China	4th	10,000 m track walk	46:58.21
2009	European Race Walking Cup	Metz, France	10th	20 km	1:36:43
2009	European Race Walking Cup	Metz, France	1st	Team - 20 km	14 pts
2009	World Championships	Berlin, Germany	14th	20 km walk	1:34:55
2010	World Race Walking Cup	Chihuahua, Mexico	4th	20 km	1:33:54
2010	European Championships	Barcelona, Spain	3rd	20 km walk	1:29:32
2011	European Race Walking Cup	Olhão, Portugal	1st	20 km	1:30:02
2011	European Race Walking Cup	Olhão, Portugal	1st	Team - 20 km	14 pts
2011	World Championships	Daegu, South Korea	11th	20 km	1:32:13
2013	European Race Walking Cup	Dudince, Slovakia	2nd	20 km	1:29:18
2013	European Race Walking Cup	Dudince, Slovakia	1st	Team - 20 km	6 pts
2013	Universiade	Kazan, Russia	—	20 km	DQ
2013	Universiade	Kazan, Russia	1st	Team - 20 km walk	4:32:34
2013	World Championships	Moscow, Russia	—	20 km	DQ
2014	World Race Walking Cup	Taicang, China	4th	20 km	1:27:03
2014	European Championships	Zürich, Switzerland	4th	20 km	1:28:24
2015	European Race Walking Cup	Murcia, Spain	6th	20 km	1:27:08
2015	European Race Walking Cup	Murcia, Spain	1st	Team - 20 km	9 pts

== See also ==
- List of doping cases in athletics
