= Brigita Virbalytė-Dimšienė =

Lithuanian racewalker (born 1985)

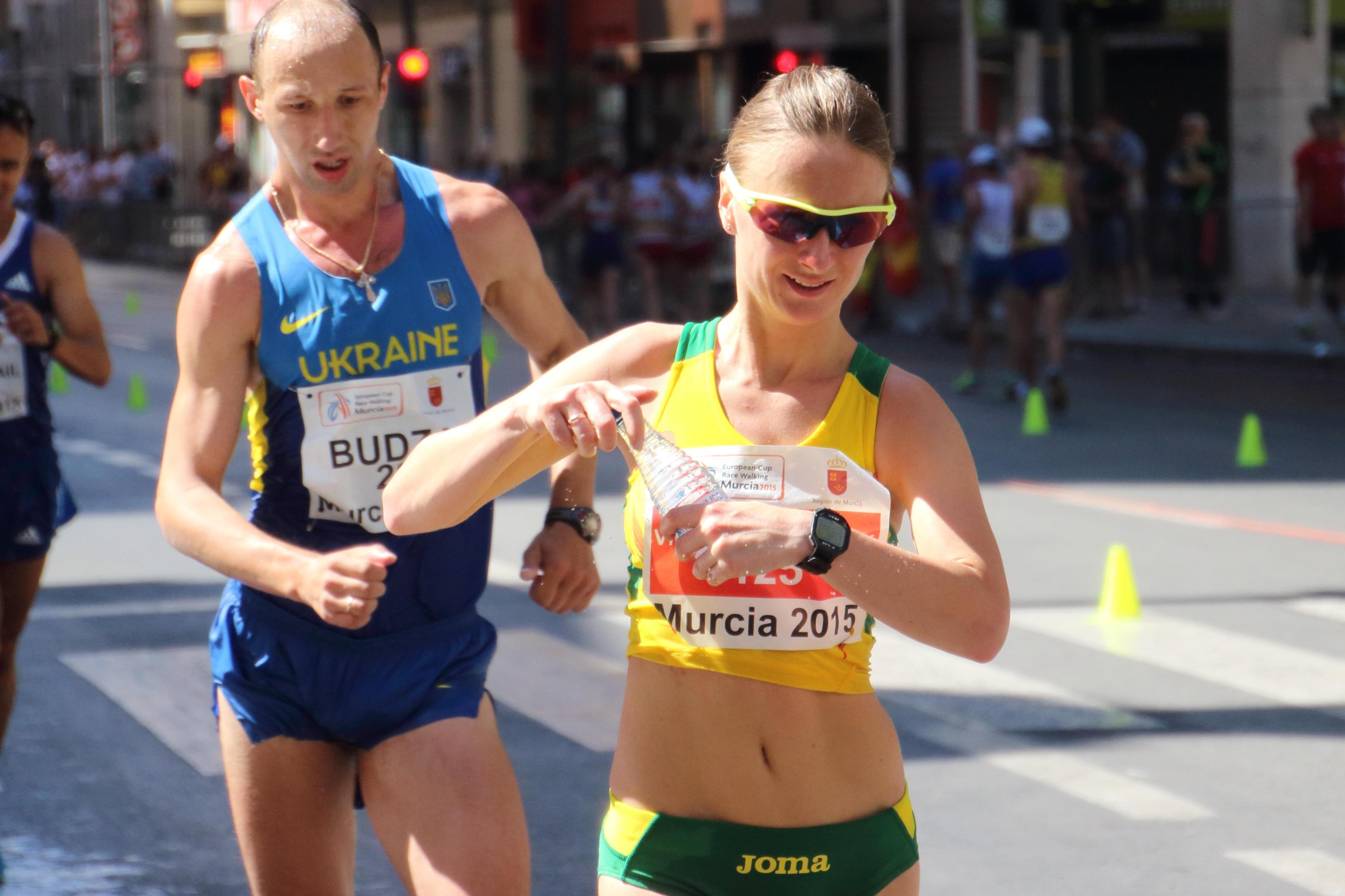

Personal information
- Born: 1 February 1985 (age 41)
- Height: 1.64 m (5 ft 5 in)
- Weight: 50 kg (110 lb)

Sport
- Country: Lithuania
- Sport: Athletics
- Event: 20km Race Walk
Medal record
European Championships
Bronze medal – third place	2018 Munich	20 km walk

Brigita Virbalytė-Dimšienė (born 1 February 1985 in Alytus) is a female professional race walker who competes internationally for Lithuania. She participated at the 2009 World Championships in Athletics and reached 24th place. She is also a Lithuanian National Radio and Television sports journalist. In 2010, she became national champion at the Druskininkai 10 km walking event, winning in a personal best of 44:42 minutes.

== International competitions ==
Year	Competition	Venue	Position	Event	Notes
Representing Lithuania
2001	World Youth Championships	Debrecen, Hungary	5th	5000 m walk	23:59.84
2003	European Junior Championships	Tampere, Finland	4th	10000 m walk	48:00.26
2004	World Race Walking Cup	Naumburg, Germany	13th	10 km walk	50:41
2004	World Junior Championships	Grosseto, Italy	9th	10000 m walk	48:51.25
2006	World Race Walking Cup	A Coruña, Spain	51st	20 km walk	1:41:28
2007	European U23 Championships	Debrecen, Hungary	8th	20 km walk	1:36:38
2007	Universiade	Bangkok, Thailand	10th	20 km walk	1:41:06
2008	World Race Walking Cup	Cheboksary, Russia	39th	20 km walk	1:36:52
2009	European Race Walking Cup	Metz, France	20th	20 km	1:40:41
2009	World Championships	Berlin, Germany	24th	20 km walk	1:36:28
2010	World Race Walking Cup	Chihuahua, Mexico	29th	20 km walk	1:42:05
2010	European Championships	Barcelona, Spain	13th	20 km walk	1:35:00
2011	European Race Walking Cup	Olhão, Portugal	16th	20 km	1:34:35
2011	World Championships	Daegu, South Korea	29th	20 km walk	1:38:39
2012	World Race Walking Cup	Saransk, Russia	41st	20 km	1:38:25
2012	Olympic Games	London, United Kingdom	25th	20 km	1:31:58
2013	European Race Walking Cup	Dudince, Slovakia	18th	20 km	1:35:46
2013	World Championships	Moscow, Russia	20th	20 km	1:31:58
2014	World Race Walking Cup	Taicang, China	34th	20 km	1:31:24
2014	European Championships	Zurich, Switzerland	18th	20 km walk	1:32:46
2015	European Race Walking Cup	Murcia, Spain	14th	20 km	1:30:37
2015	World Championships	Beijing, China	7th	20 km	1:30:20
