= 2002 World Junior Championships in Athletics – Women's 10,000 metres walk =

The women's 10,000 metres walk event at the 2002 World Junior Championships in Athletics was held in Kingston, Jamaica, at National Stadium on 18 July.

== Medalists ==
Gold	Fumi Mitsumura; Japan
Silver	Liu Siqi; China
Bronze	Marina Tikhonova; Belarus

== Results ==
=== Final ===
18 July

Rank	Name	Nationality	Time	Notes
1st place, gold medalist(s)	Fumi Mitsumura	Japan	46:01.51	
2nd place, silver medalist(s)	Liu Siqi	China	46:07.15	
3rd place, bronze medalist(s)	Marina Tikhonova	Belarus	46:14.67	
4	Guo Dongmei	China	46:31.49	
5	Zuzana Malíková	Slovakia	46:46.29	
6	Ariana Quino Salazar	Bolivia	47:03.74	
7	Tatyana Kozlova	Russia	47:51.79	
8	Barbora Dibelková	Czech Republic	47:53.58	
9	Vera Sokolova	Russia	47:59.14	
10	Laura Johnson	Australia	48:04.78	
11	Yekatarina Labashova	Belarus	48:13.66	
12	Ana Cabecinha	Portugal	48:57.61	
13	Maja Landmann	Germany	49:10.58	
14	Alessandra Picagevicz	Brazil	49:41.41	
15	Nicolene Cronje	South Africa	50:03.34	
16	Ann Loughnane	Ireland	51:11.54	
17	Sibilla Di Vincenzo	Italy	52:22.77	
18	Robyn Stevens	United States	52:53.94	
19	Anne Favolise	United States	53:28.29	
	Ulrike Sischka	Germany	DQ	
	Julie Goubault	France	DQ	
	Anna Szumny	Poland	DNF	
	Sarah Walkley	Australia	DNF	
	Lizbeth Zúñiga	Peru	DNF	

== Participation ==
According to an unofficial count, 24 athletes from 18 countries participated in the event.

- Australia (2)
- Belarus (2)
- Bolivia (1)
- Brazil (1)
- China (2)
- Czech Republic (1)
- France (1)
- Germany (2)
- Ireland (1)
- Italy (1)
- Japan (1)
- Peru (1)
- Poland (1)
- Portugal (1)
- Russia (2)
- Slovakia (1)
- South Africa (1)
- United States (2)
