= Olga Mikhaylova =

Russian racewalker

Olga Mikhaylova (born December 7, 1986) is a race walker from Russia.

== Achievements ==
Year	Competition	Venue	Position	Event	Notes
Representing Russia
2005	European Junior Championships	Kaunas, Lithuania	2nd	10,000 m walk	45:31.49
2007	European U23 Championships	Debrecen, Hungary	3rd	20 km walk	1:34:41
2009	Universiade	Belgrade, Serbia	1st	20 km walk	1:30:43
