= Ainhoa Pinedo =

Spanish racewalker

Personal information
- Full name: Ainhoa Pinedo González
- Nationality: Spanish, MADRID
- Born: 17 February 1983 (age 43) Madrid, Spain

Sport
- Sport: Track and field
- Event: Race walking
- Club: A.D. Marathon
- Coached by: Manuel Ángel Segura

Ainhoa Pinedo González (born 17 February 1983) is a Spanish race walker who competes for Spain internationally.

== Competition record ==
Year	Competition	Venue	Position	Event	Notes
Representing Spain
2009	Universiade	Belgrade, Serbia	10th	20 km	1:38:23
2014	World Race Walking Cup	Taicang, China	45th	20 km	1:33:13
2014	Ibero-American Championships	São Paulo, Brazil	8th	10,000 m	46:46
2016	World Race Walking Cup	Rome, Italy	44th	20 km	1:34:30
2017	World Championships	London, United Kingdom	21st	20 km	1:31:28
2018	World Race Walking Cup	Taicang, China	16th	50 km	4:30:02
2018	European Championships	Berlin, Germany	7th	50 km	4:27.03
