= Agnieszka Yarokhau =

Polish race walker

Personal information
- Born: 28 December 1986 (age 39) Myślenice, Poland
- Height: 165 cm (5 ft 5 in)
- Weight: 51 kg (112 lb)

Sport
- Sport: Racewalking

Agnieszka Yarokhau (née Szwarnóg; born 28 December 1986 in Myślenice) is a Polish race walker. She competed for Poland at the 2012 Summer Olympics, finishing 19th in the women's 20 km event.

She competed again for Poland at the 2016 Summer Olympics, finishing 44th in the women's 20 km event
