= Elmira Alembekova =

Russian race walker

Medal record

Women's athletics

Representing Russia

European Championships
Gold medal – first place	2014 Zürich	20 km walk

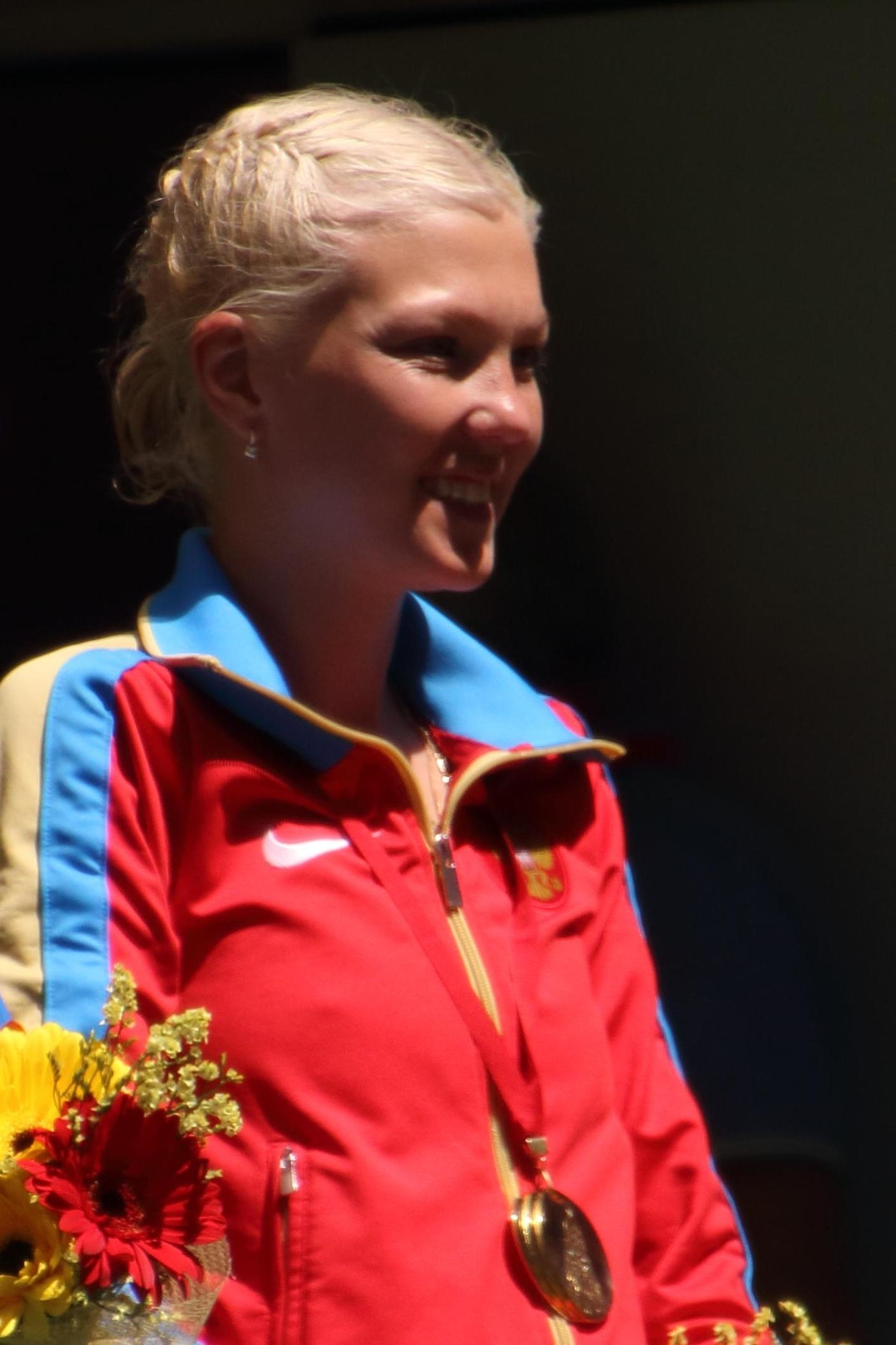
Elmira Alembekova (2015)

Elmira Shamilevna Alembekova (Russian: Эльмира Шамильевна Алембекова; Tatar Latin: Elmira Şəmil qızı Əlimbeyova; born 30 June 1990 in Saransk) is a Russian race walker. She won the gold medal in the 20 kilometres walk event at the 2014 European Championships in Athletics. She continues to be coached by Viktor Chegin, after he has been suspended for a lengthy series of performance-enhancing drug suspensions against many of his athletes.

== Doping case ==
In September 2015 IAAF confirmed that Alembekova was provisionally suspended after a sample from an out-of-competition control in Saransk in June had been found positive for a prohibited substance.

== Competition record ==
Year	Competition	Venue	Position	Event	Notes
Representing Russia
2005	World Youth Championships	Marrakesh, Morocco	2nd	5000 m	22:27.17
2008	World Race Walking Cup (U20)	Cheboksary, Russia	3rd	10 km	44:39
2008	World Junior Championships	Bydgoszcz, Poland	2nd	10,000m	43:45.16
2009	European Junior Championships	Novi Sad, Serbia	1st	10,000m	46:31.07
2012	World Race Walking Cup	Saransk, Russia	—	20 km	DNF
2014	World Race Walking Cup	Taicang, China	3rd	20 km	1:27:02
2014	European Championships	Zürich, Switzerland	1st	20 km	1:27:56
2015	European Race Walking Cup	Murcia, Spain	1st	20 km	1:26:15
2015	European Race Walking Cup	Murcia, Spain	1st	20 km - Team	9 pts
