= Sholpan Kozhakhmetova =

Kazakhstani race walker

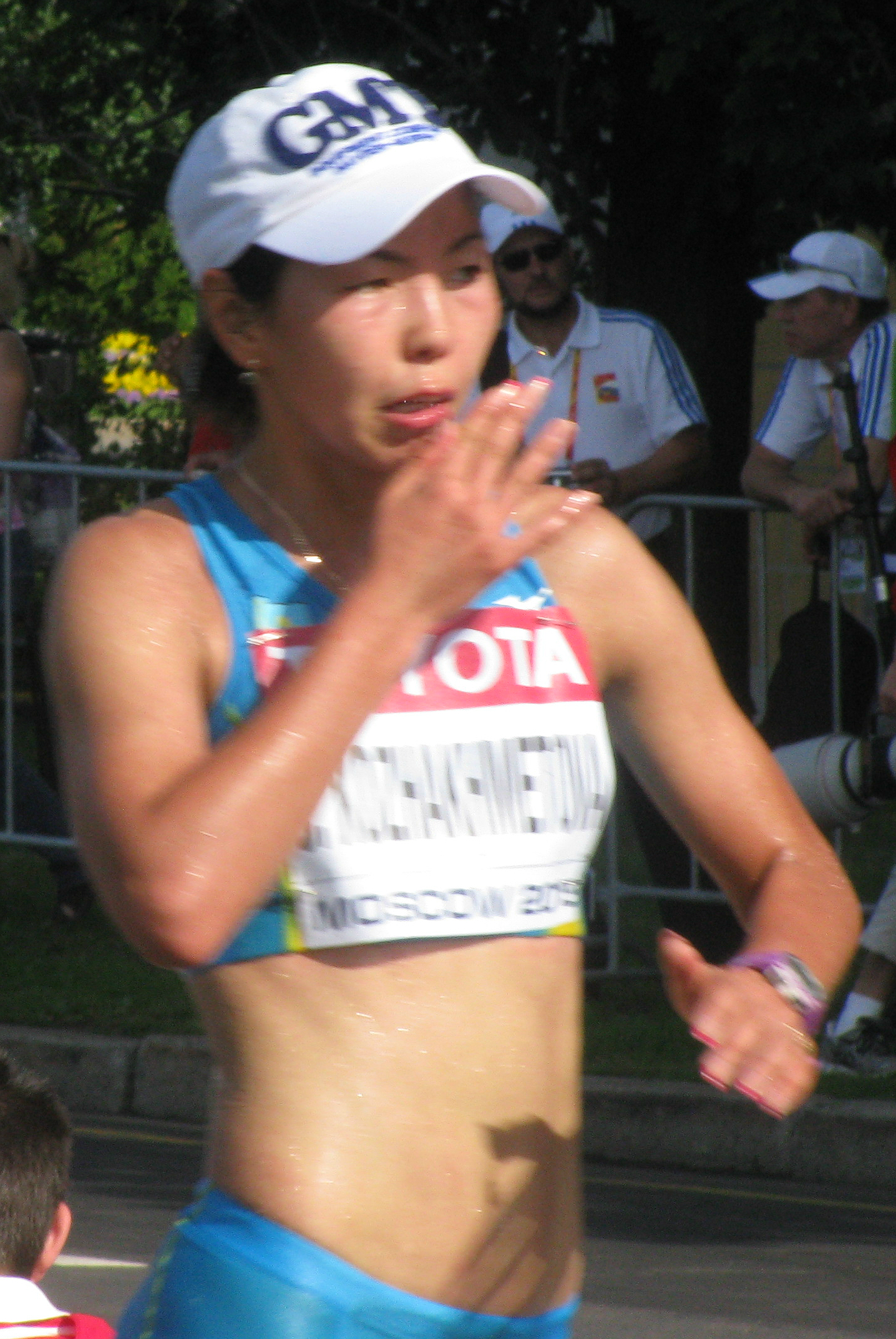
Sholpan Kozhakhmetova in action during Women's 20 kilometres walk at the 2013 World Championships in Athletics

Sholpan Kozhakhmetova (born 23 April 1991 in Taldykorgan) is a Kazakhstani race walker. She competed in the 20 km kilometres event at the 2012 Summer Olympics. Her twin sister, Ayman, competed in the same event at the 2012 Olympics.
