= Olha Iakovenko =

Ukrainian race walker (born 1987)

Olha Iakovenko (born 1 June 1987, in Vinnytsia) is a Ukrainian race walker. She competed in the 20 km kilometres event at the 2012 Summer Olympics.
