= Anne Halkivaha =

Finnish racewalker

Personal information
- Born: 9 February 1986 (age 39) Oripää
- Height: 1.62 m (5 ft 4 in)
- Weight: 49 kg (108 lb)

Sport
- Country: Finland
- Sport: Athletics
- Event: Race Walking
- Club: Turku Weikot
- Coached by: Reima Salonen, Erik Halkivaha

Anne Halkivaha (born 9 February 1986 in Oripää) is a Finnish race walker. She competed in the 20 km event at the 2012 Summer Olympics in London, finishing in 54th place.
