= Laura Reynolds =

Irish racewalker

Personal information
- Born: 21 January 1989 (age 37)
- Height: 1.71 m (5 ft 7 1/2 in)
- Weight: 57 kg (126 lb)

Sport
- Country: Ireland
- Sport: Athletics
- Event: 20km Race Walk

Laura Reynolds (born 21 January 1989) is an Irish long distance race walker, from Eslinbridge, County Leitrim who competed at the 2012 Summer Olympics in the 20k walk where she finished 18th out of 59 walkers and set a personal best.

She is a graduate of Dublin City University, where she obtained a Degree in PE and Biology.
