= Nastassia Yatsevich =

Belarusian race walker

Nastassia Aliaksandrauna Yatsevich (Belarusian: Настасься Аляксандраўна Яцэвіч; born 18 January 1985 in Omsk, Russia) is a Belarusian race walker. She competed in the 20 km kilometres event at the 2012 Summer Olympics. In 2019, she competed in the women's 50 kilometres walk at the 2019 World Athletics Championships held in Doha, Qatar. She finished in 12th place.
