= Lucie Pelantová =

Czech race walker

Lucie Pelantová (born 7 May 1986 in Prague) is a Czech race walker. She competed in the 20 km kilometres event at the 2012 Summer Olympics and at the 2013 World Championships in Athletics held in Moscow, also in the 20-km walk.
