= Hanna Drabenia =

Belarusian race walker

Hanna Drabenia born 15 August 1987, Starobin, Minsk Region is a Belarusian race walker. She competed in the 20 km kilometres event at the 2012 Summer Olympics, finishing 25th with a time of 1:31:58.

She has raced at various major international competitions and was 24th in the women's 20-kilometer walk at the 2012 London Olympics and 16th at the world championships a year later. On 31 March 2016, Belarusian race walker Hanna Drabenia picked up a two-year ban following a failed test at a competition in Belarus in 2015.
