= Dudince =

- Town
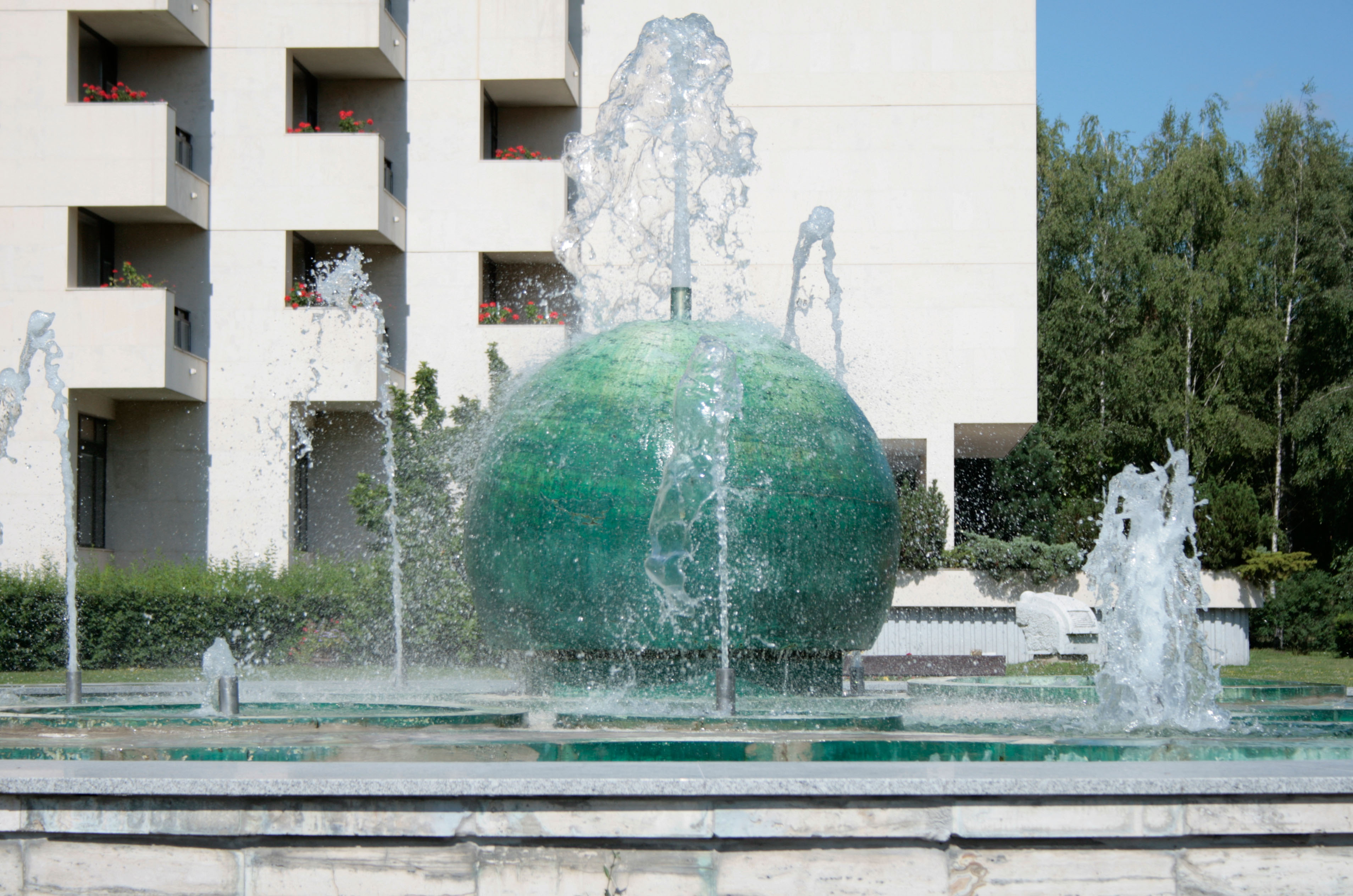

- Flag Coat of arms

- Location of Dudince in the Banská Bystrica Region Location of Dudince in Slovakia
- Coordinates: 48°10′00″N 18°52′58″E
- Country: Slovakia
- Region: Banská Bystrica Region
- District: Krupina District
- Founded: 1284

Government
  - Mayor: Dušan Strieborný

Area
  - Total: 6.84 km^{2} (2.64 sq mi)
- (2022)
- Elevation: 144 m (472 ft)

Population (2025)
  - Total: 1,377
- Time zone: UTC+1 (CET)
  - Summer (DST): UTC+2 (CEST)
- Postal code: 962 71
- Area code: +421-45
- Vehicle registration plate (until 2022): KA
- Website: dudince-mesto.sk

Dudince (before 1927 Ďudince, Hungarian: Gyűgy, German: Dudintze) is a spa town in southern Slovakia. With a population of around 1,400, it is the smallest town in Slovakia. It is known for its mineral water, hot springs and destination spas. It is located near the edge of the Banská Bystrica Region of Slovakia.

== Geography ==
The municipality lies at an altitude of 144 metres (472 ft) and covers an area of 6.84 km^{2} (2.64 sq mi) (2025).

It is located in the foothills of the Krupina Plain (inner western Carpathian Mountains) in the valley of the Štiavnica river, around 27 km south-west from Krupina and 15 km north from Šahy. Besides the main settlement, there is a formerly independent village, Merovce (annexed in 1960).

The town lies in the Stredoslovenska wine region and is surrounded by vineyards. Travertine piles and a "Roman" spa (see image gallery) can also be found there.

=== Climate ===
Climate data for Dudince (1991−2020)
Month	Jan	Feb	Mar	Apr	May	Jun	Jul	Aug	Sep	Oct	Nov	Dec	Year
Record high °C (°F)	15.1 (59.2)	18.8 (65.8)	23.8 (74.8)	31.5 (88.7)	32.9 (91.2)	37.4 (99.3)	40.2 (104.4)	40.4 (104.7)	34.6 (94.3)	29.0 (84.2)	22.4 (72.3)	15.4 (59.7)	40.4 (104.7)
Mean daily maximum °C (°F)	2.7 (36.9)	5.9 (42.6)	11.4 (52.5)	18.1 (64.6)	22.8 (73.0)	26.3 (79.3)	28.6 (83.5)	28.5 (83.3)	22.7 (72.9)	16.2 (61.2)	9.3 (48.7)	3.3 (37.9)	16.3 (61.3)
Daily mean °C (°F)	−1.2 (29.8)	0.7 (33.3)	5.0 (41.0)	11.0 (51.8)	15.8 (60.4)	19.5 (67.1)	21.2 (70.2)	20.6 (69.1)	15.2 (59.4)	9.8 (49.6)	5.1 (41.2)	0.0 (32.0)	10.2 (50.4)
Mean daily minimum °C (°F)	−4.8 (23.4)	−3.9 (25.0)	0.4 (32.7)	3.9 (39.0)	8.7 (47.7)	12.3 (54.1)	13.9 (57.0)	13.8 (56.8)	9.5 (49.1)	5.0 (41.0)	1.5 (34.7)	−3.3 (26.1)	4.7 (40.5)
Record low °C (°F)	−30.3 (−22.5)	−21.2 (−6.2)	−17.1 (1.2)	−7.8 (18.0)	−2.8 (27.0)	1.1 (34.0)	4.3 (39.7)	4.0 (39.2)	−1.3 (29.7)	−10.5 (13.1)	−14.0 (6.8)	−26.1 (−15.0)	−30.3 (−22.5)
Average precipitation mm (inches)	39.0 (1.54)	34.1 (1.34)	35.6 (1.40)	37.8 (1.49)	66.5 (2.62)	71.1 (2.80)	75.7 (2.98)	64.1 (2.52)	54.8 (2.16)	48.5 (1.91)	49.4 (1.94)	42.5 (1.67)	619.1 (24.37)
Average precipitation days (≥ 1.0 mm)	7.1	6.9	6.7	6.1	8.7	8.0	8.3	6.8	6.8	7.1	8.3	7.4	88.2
Average snowy days	8.6	6.6	3.4	0.7	0.0	0.0	0.0	0.0	0.0	0.2	2.9	6.4	28.8
Average relative humidity (%)	85.0	79.5	72.2	65.9	69.0	69.8	67.8	69.9	75.8	81.3	84.5	86.5	75.6
Mean monthly sunshine hours	61.3	96.3	157.0	215.7	252.0	267.9	281.1	271.6	193.0	139.7	72.8	49.4	2,057.8
Source: NOAA

== History ==
Archaeological discoveries show that the town was inhabited in the Neolithic era. The first written acknowledgement dates back to 1284 as Dyud. The oldest mention of the hot springs was in 1551, however, there is strong evidence to suggest that the Romas knew of the thermal pools over 2000 years ago.

The town was the host for the 2013 European Race Walking Cup.

== Population ==
Population statistic (10 years)
Year	1995	2005	2015	2025
Count	1608	1503	1429	1377
Difference		−6.52%	−4.92%	−3.63%

Population statistic
Year	2024	2025
Count	1362	1377
Difference		+1.10%

It has a population of 1377 people (31 December 2025).

=== Ethnicity ===
Census 2021 (1+ %)
Ethnicity	Number	Fraction
Slovak	1293	93.69%
Hungarian	51	3.69%
Not found out	37	2.68%
Total	1380	

In year 2021 was 1380 people by ethnicity 1293 as Slovak, 51 as Hungarian, 37 as Not found out, 10 as Other, 9 as Czech, 9 as Ukrainian, 6 as Russian, 5 as Rusyn, 3 as Canadian, 2 as German, 2 as French, 2 as English, 1 as Serbian and 1 as Moravian.

Note on population: The difference values of population numbers in the table "Population statistic" and in the sections "Ethnicity" & "Religion" is caused by the use of various statistical methods.

=== Religion ===
Census 2021 (1+ %)
Religion	Number	Fraction
Roman Catholic Church	681	49.35%
Evangelical Church	337	24.42%
None	265	19.2%
Not found out	48	3.48%
Greek Catholic Church	15	1.09%
Total	1380	

In year 2021 was 1380 people by religion 681 from Roman Catholic Church, 337 from Evangelical Church, 265 from None, 48 from Not found out, 15 from Greek Catholic Church, 7 from Islam, 6 from Eastern Orthodox Church, 4 from Other, 4 from Ad hoc movements, 2 from Other and not ascertained christian church, 2 from Jehovah's Witnesses, 2 from Christian Congregations in Slovakia, 2 from Buddhism, 1 from Jewish community, 1 from Calvinist Church, 1 from Paganism and natural spirituality, 1 from Seventh-day Adventist Church and 1 from Apostolic Church.

According to the 2001 census, the town had 1,500 inhabitants. 95.67% of inhabitants were Slovaks, 3.53% Hungarians and 0.20% Roma. The religious make-up was 55.67% Roman Catholics, 28.93% Lutherans and 11.27% people with no religious affiliation.

== Sister city ==
Dudince is a twin town of Kent, Ohio, in the United States.

== See also ==
- List of municipalities and towns in Slovakia

== Genealogical resources ==
The records for genealogical research are available at the state archive, Statny Archiv in Banska Bystrica, Nitra, Slovakia.

- Roman Catholic church records (births/marriages/deaths): 1784-1893 (parish B)
- Lutheran church records (births/marriages/deaths): 1783-1929 (parish B)

== Photos ==
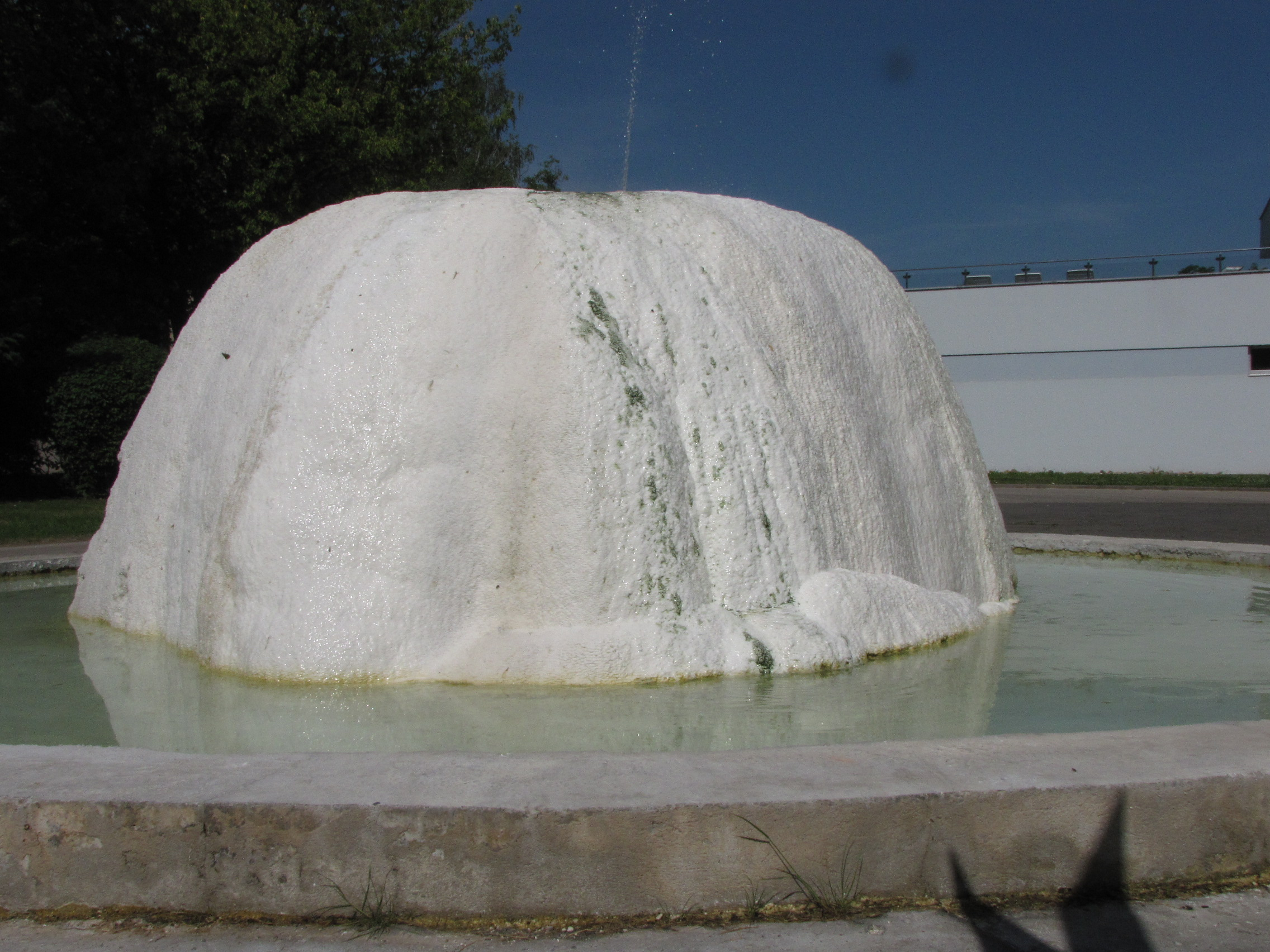
Thermal water source

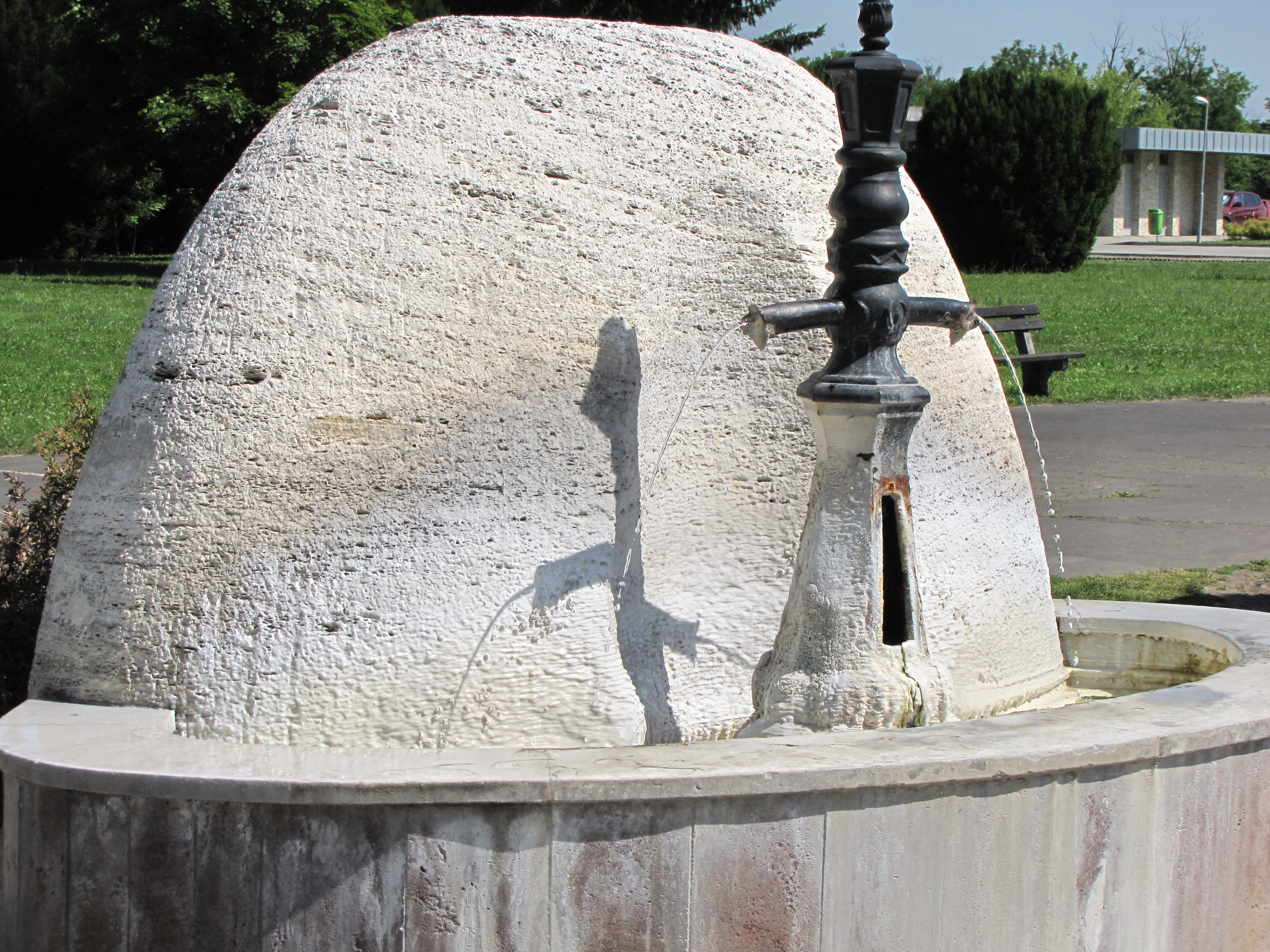
Thermal water source

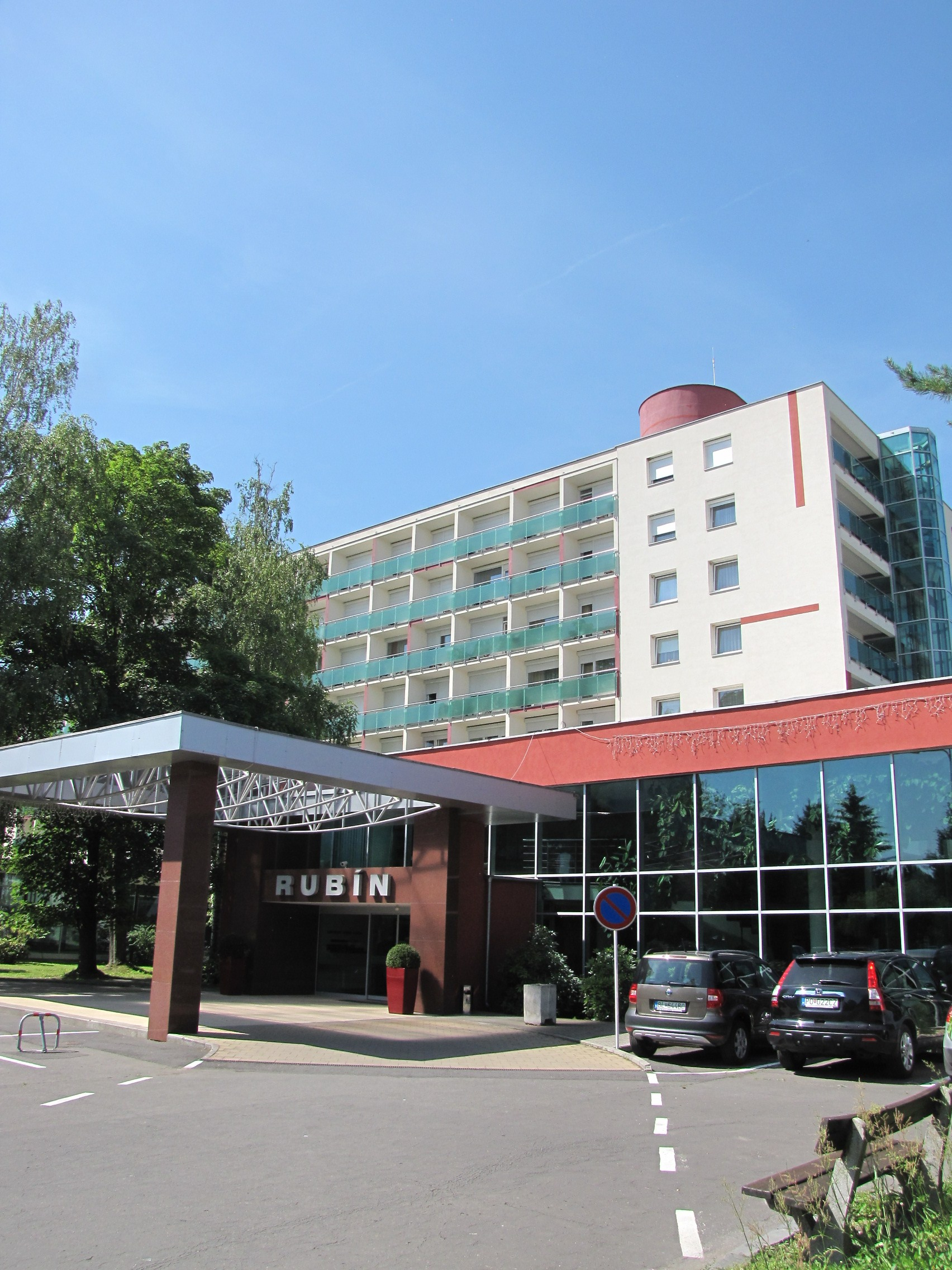
Hotel Rubin

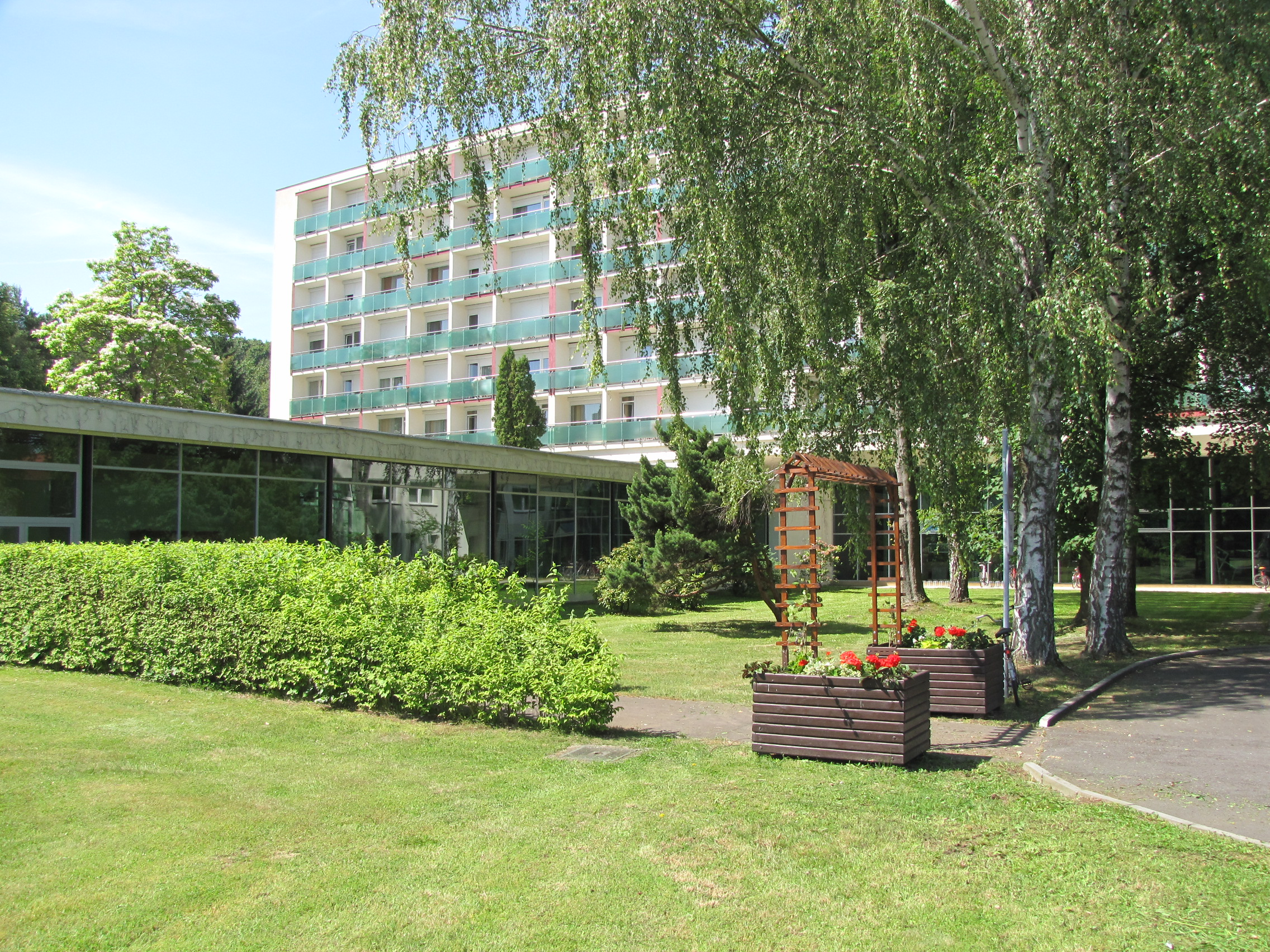
Hotel Rubin

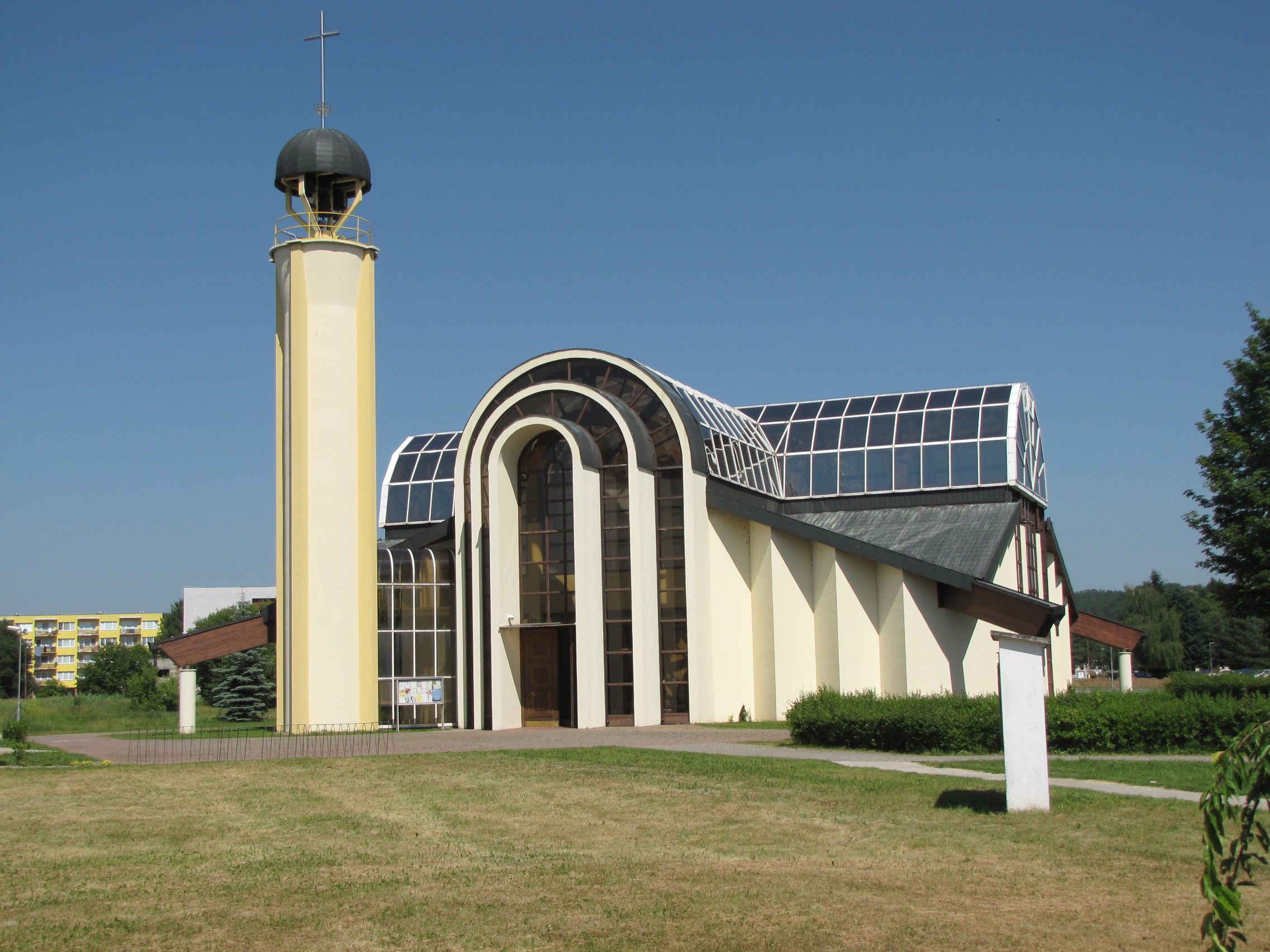
Parish Church of Our Lady Queen of Peace

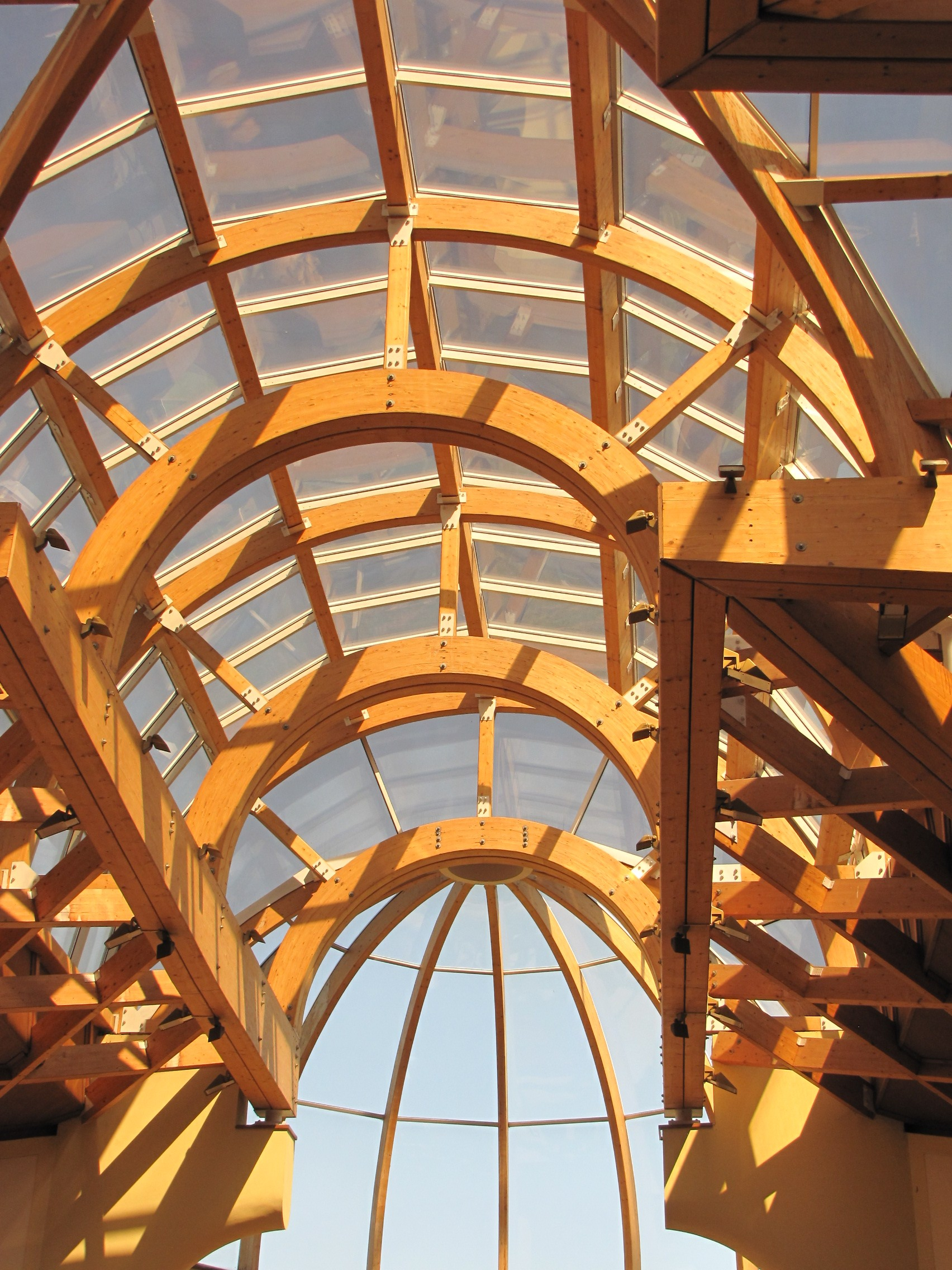
Parish Church of Our Lady Queen of Peace

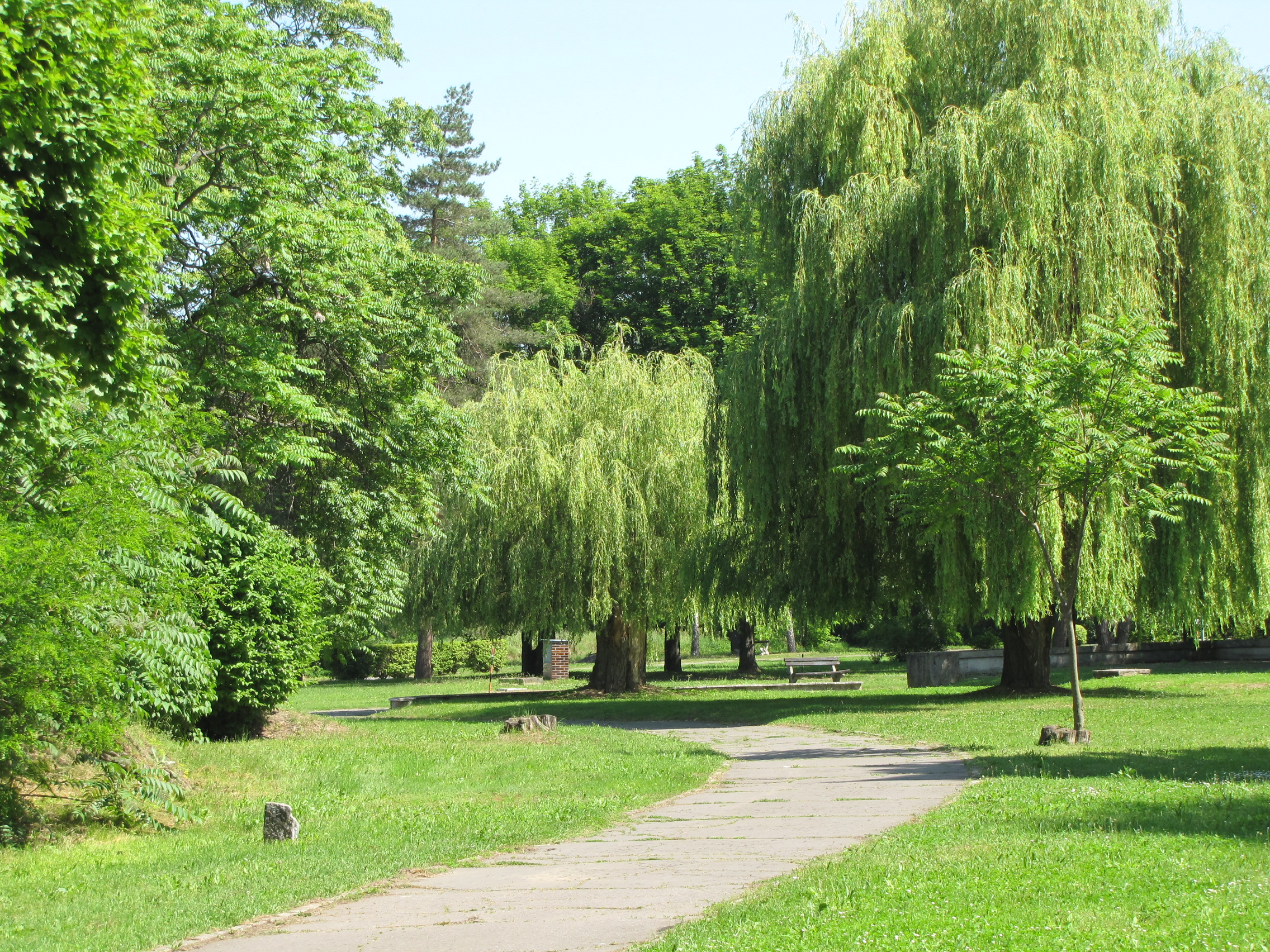
Park detail
