= World Athletics Race Walking Tour =

Racewalking series organised by World Athletics

- Sport: Racewalking
- Founded: 2003
- Official website: Race Walking

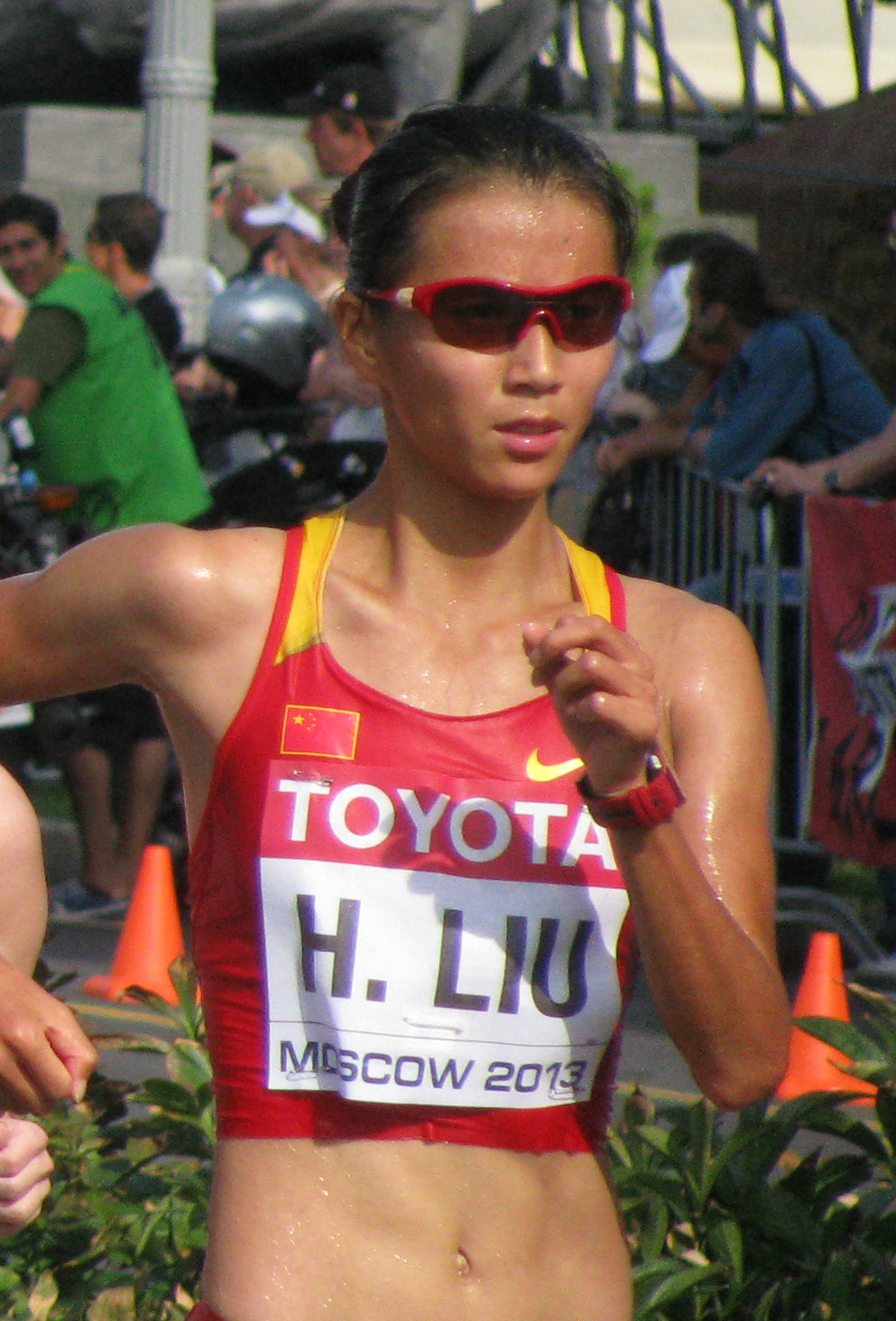
Liu Hong, the series' most successful athlete, racing at the 2013 World Championships

The World Athletics Race Walking Tour (formerly IAAF Race Walking Challenge and World Athletics Challenge - Race Walking) is a racewalking series organised by World Athletics. Athletes accumulate points in specific race walk meetings during the season. Performances in 10 kilometres race walk, 20 kilometres race walk and 50 kilometres race walk count towards athlete's final scores. Since 2011, racewalking performances at the World Athletics Championships and Olympic Games count towards the series. Women have competed in the 50 km distance since 2018.

The series started as a global tour of elite-level, independently-held racewalking meetings. From 2007 to 2012, the series culminated in the IAAF Race Walking Challenge Final. The inclusion of the 2008 IAAF World Race Walking Cup in 2008 marked a move to incorporate international championships into the series. The World Cup returned to the tour in 2010, which was also the first time that the Australian Race Walking Championships was added to the calendar. The 2011 World Championships in Athletics was the first time that performances at a major global athletics championship were included in the series, and this was followed by 2012 Summer Olympics a year later. The series was remodelled in 2013, as the Challenge Final was abolished and instead all the global and continental racewalking competitions were included: the Oceania Race Walking Championships, the Asian Race Walking Championships, the European Race Walking Cup, the African Race Walking Championships, South American Race Walking Championships and the Pan American Race Walking Cup. The 2014 series included the African Championships in Athletics and European Athletics Championships for the first time.

The highest points score achieved in a single series before 2019 is 48, which was achieved by Norway's Kjersti Plätzer in 2009 for women and China's Wang Zhen in 2012 for men. After two seasons when the competition did not take place due to the COVID-19 pandemic, the points system was overhauled.

Chinese female walkers Liu Hong and Qieyang Shijie are the most successful athletes of the series, both having won the series on three occasions and being runners-up on one. Australian Jared Tallent and Brazilian Caio Bonfim are the most successful man, with two men's titles and runner-up on two occasions each.

== Editions ==
World Athletics Race Walking Tour editions
Ed.	Year	Start date	End date	Meets	Ref.
1	2003	8 March	7 June	4	
2	2004	20 March	20 June	5	
3	2005	19 March	4 June	5	
4	2006	25 March	1 May	4	
5	2007	10 March	29 September	7	
6	2008	8 March	21 September	8	
7	2009	8 March	19 September	10	
8	2010	13 February	18 September	11	
9	2011	19 February	17 September	10	
10	2012	25 February	14 September	12	
11	2013	23 February	13 August	14	
12	2014	2 February	14 August	12	
13	2015	22 February	28 August	10	
14	2016	21 February	19 August	11	
15	2017	19 February	13 August	10	
16	2018	11 February	24 September	10	
17	2019	1 December 2018	22 October	12	
18	2021	5 June	5 June	1	
19	2022	19 December 2021	29 October	24	
20	2023	18 December 2022	28 October	21	
21	2024	17 December 2023	26 October	18	

== Meetings ==
World Athletics Race Walking Tour meetings
#	Meeting	City	Country	2003	2004	2005	2006	2007	2008	2009	2010	2011	2012	2013	2014	2015	2016	2017	2018	2019	2020
1	Grand Prix Internacional de Marcha Tijuana	Tijuana	Mexico	X	X	X															
2	Grande Prémio Internacional de Rio Maior em Marcha Atlética	Rio Maior	Portugal	X	X	X	X	X	X	X	X	X	X	X	X	X	X	X	X	X	
3	Gran Premio Cantones de La Coruña	A Coruña	Spain	X	X	X	†	X	X	X	X	‡	X	X	X	X	X	X	X	X	
4	Coppa Città di Sesto San Giovanni	Sesto San Giovanni	Italy	X	X	X	X	X	X	X	X	X	X	X							
5	Kunshan IAAF Race Walking Challenge	Kunshan	China		X																
6	Cixi IAAF Race Walking Challenge	Cixi	China			X															
7	Yangzhou IAAF Race Walking Challenge	Yangzhou	China				X														
8	Tlalnepantla de Baz IAAF Race Walking Challenge	Tlalnepantla de Baz	Mexico				X														
9	Naucalpan IAAF Race Walking Challenge	Naucalpan	Mexico					X													
10	Shenzhen IAAF Race Walking Challenge	Shenzhen	China					X													
11	Na Rynek Marsz!	Kraków	Poland					X	X	X	X										
12	IAAF Race Walking Challenge Final	Various	Various					X	X	X	X	X	X								
13	Circuito Internacional de Marcha Chihuahua	Chihuahua City	Mexico						X	X	†	X	X	X	X	X	X	X			
14	Beijing IAAF Race Walking Challenge	Beijing	China						X		‡										
15	IAAF World Race Walking Team Championships	Various	Various						X		X		X		X		X		X		
16	Memorial Mario Albisetti	Lugano	Switzerland							X	X	X	X	X	X						
17	Marxa Santa Eulalia	Santa Eulària des Riu	Spain							X											
18	Wuxi IAAF Race Walking Challenge	Wuxi	China							X											
19	Dublin Grand Prix of Race Walking	Dublin	Ireland							X		X		X							
20	Australian Race Walking Championships/ Oceania Race Walking Championships	Various	Australia								X	X	X	X	X	X	X	X	X	X	
21	Meeting de Marcha Atlética da Cidade de Olhão	Olhão	Portugal								X										
22	Dudinská Päťdesiatka	Dudince	Slovakia								X	X	X		X	X	X				
23	Alytus Race Walking festival	Alytus	Lithuania								X		X							††	
24	Taicang IAAF Race Walking Challenge	Taicang	China									X	X	X	†	X	X	X	†	X	
25	World Championships	Various	Various									X		X		X		X		X	
26	Olympic Games	Various	Various										X				X				
27	Asian Race Walking Championships	Nomi	Japan											X	X	X	X	X	X	X	
28	Poděbrady Race Walking	Poděbrady	Czech Republic											X	X						
29	African Race Walking Championships	Belle Vue Harel	Mauritius											X							
30	European Race Walking Cup	Various	Various											X		X		X		X	
31	Pan American Race Walking Cup	Various	Various											X		X		X		X	
32	South American Race Walking Championships	Various	Various												X		X		X		
33	African Championships in Athletics	Various	Various												X		X		X		
34	European Athletics Championships	Various	Various												X				X		
35	Memorial Jerzy Hausleber	Monterrey	Mexico															X	X		
36	Around Taihu International Race Walking	Suzhou	China																X	X	

- The IAAF World Race Walking Team Championships was known as the IAAF World Race Walking Cup until 2016
- † = Meeting hosted IAAF World Cup/Team Championships
- ‡ = Meeting hosted Challenge Final
- †† = Meeting hosted the European Race Walking Cup
- The 2016 and 2017 Chihuahua meeting was held in Ciudad Juárez
- The 2019 series featured three Oceania championship events: the 50 km, the 20 km and the 10,000 m walks

== Results ==
=== Men ===
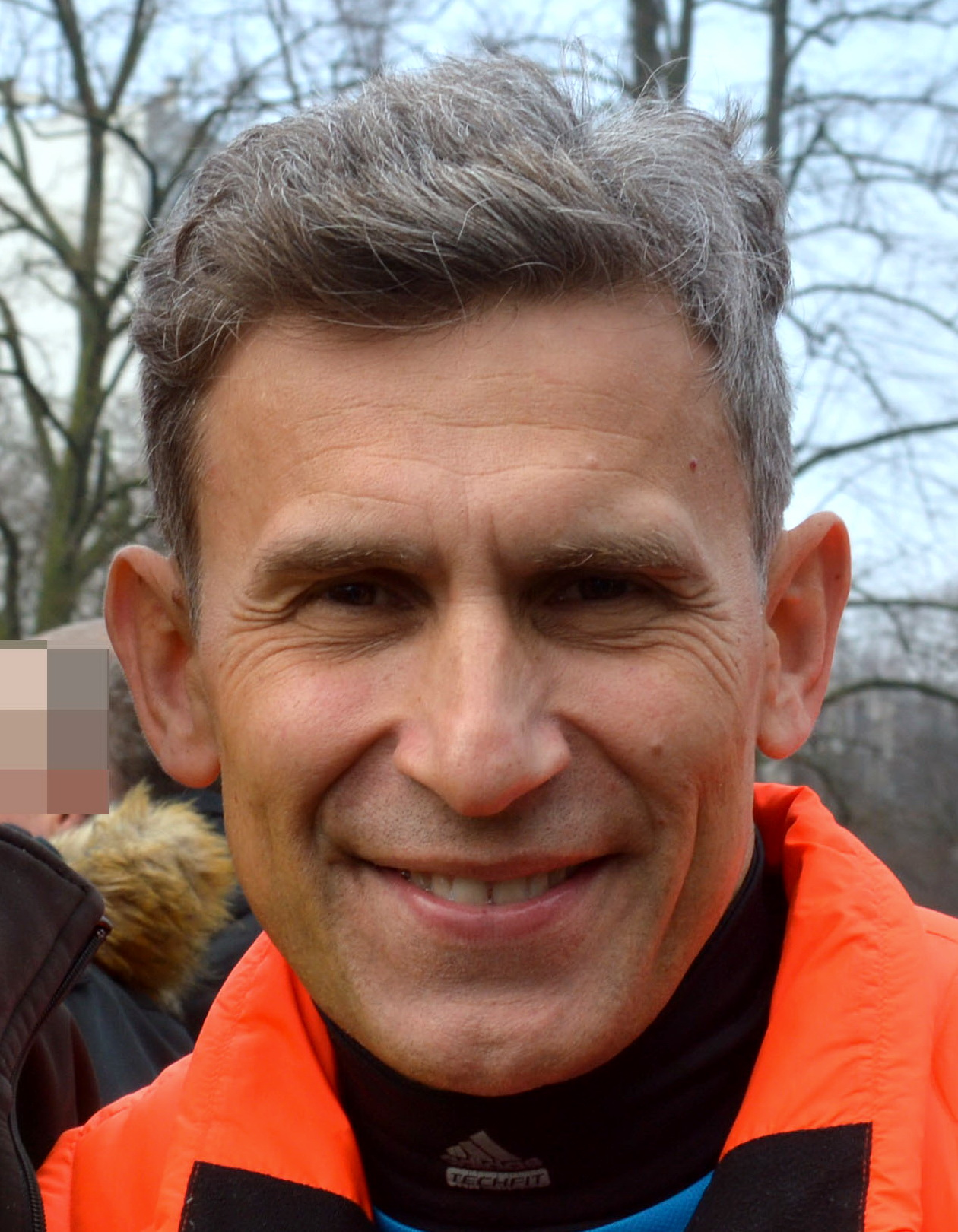
Robert Korzeniowski of Poland won the first two men's titles

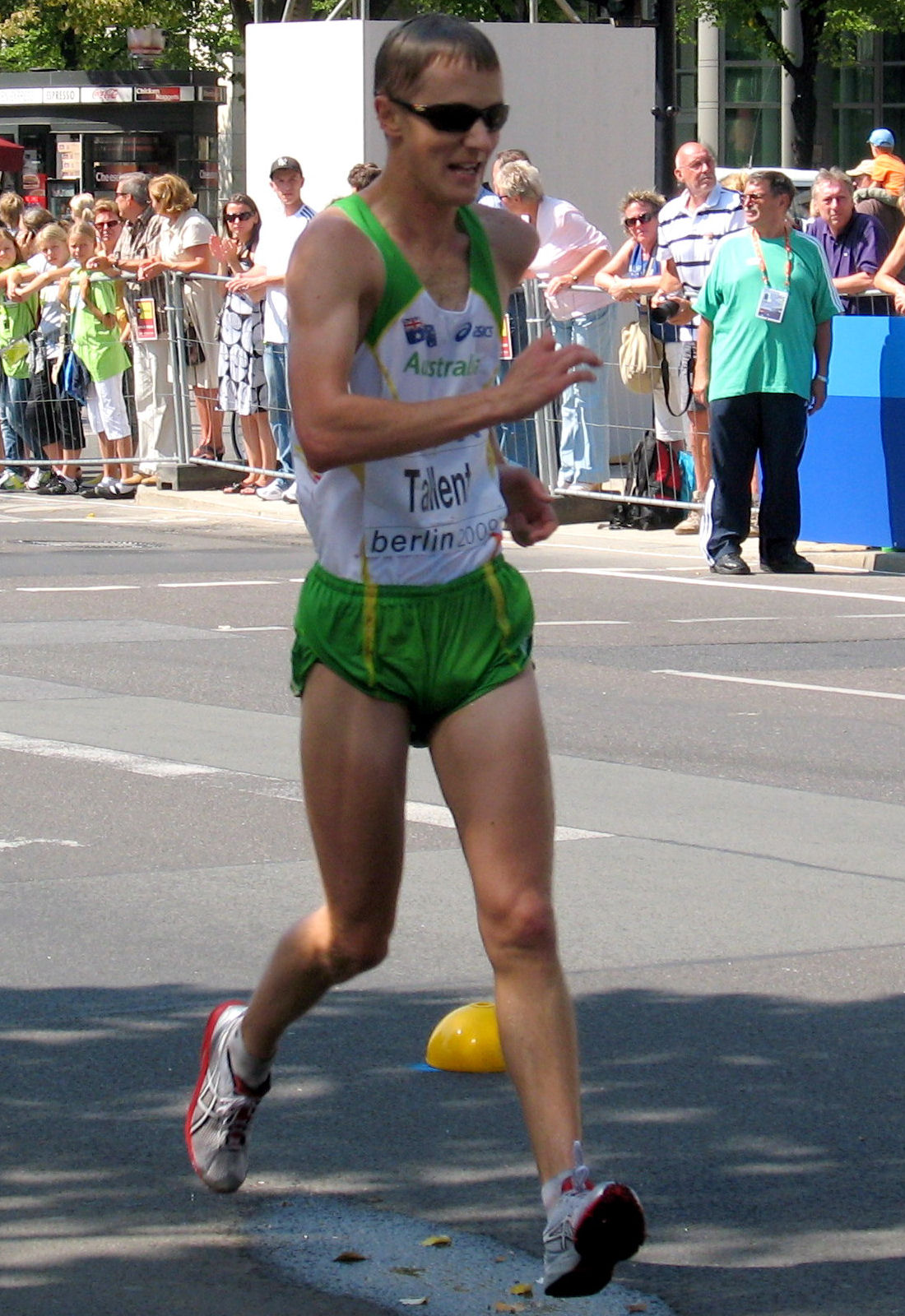
Australia's Jared Tallent is a two-time winner

Year	Gold		Silver		Bronze	
2003	Robert Korzeniowski; Poland	33	Paquillo Fernández; Spain	28	Aigars Fadejevs; Latvia	27
2004	Robert Korzeniowski; Poland	28	Jefferson Pérez; Ecuador	27	Ivano Brugnetti; Italy	23
2005	Paquillo Fernández; Spain	30	Nathan Deakes; Australia	29	Juan Manuel Molina; Spain	19
2006	Paquillo Fernández; Spain	28	Ilya Markov; Russia	28	Hatem Ghoula; Tunisia	20
2007	Luke Adams; Australia	36	Erik Tysse; Norway	33	Paquillo Fernández; Spain	32
2008	Jared Tallent; Australia	46	Jefferson Pérez; Ecuador	40	Eder Sánchez; Mexico	38
2009	Eder Sánchez; Mexico	44	Hao Wang; China	42	Luke Adams; Australia	22
2010	Chu Yafei; China	40	Matej Tóth; Slovakia	30	Wang Hao; China	28
2011	Valeriy Borchin; Russia	44	Wang Zhen; China	30	Chu Yafei; China	17
2012	Wang Zhen; China	48	Jared Tallent; Australia	40	Chen Ding; China	38
2013	Jared Tallent; Australia	34	Joao Vieira; Portugal	28	Matej Tóth; Slovakia	26
2014	Ruslan Dmytrenko; Ukraine	29	Jared Tallent; Australia	23	Caio Bonfim; Brazil	18
2015	Matej Tóth; Slovakia	29	Miguel Ángel López; Spain	25	Chen Ding; China	24
2016	Wang Zhen; China	36	Jared Tallent; Australia	27	Andrés Chocho; Ecuador	26
2017	Éider Arévalo; Colombia	36	Caio Bonfim; Brazil Andrés Chocho; Ecuador	25	Not awarded	
2018	Diego García; Spain Lebogang Shange; South Africa	27	Not awarded		Andrés Chocho; Ecuador	25
2019	Perseus Karlström; Sweden	32	Toshikazu Yamanishi; Japan	30	Diego García; Spain	26
2022	Perseus Karlström; Sweden	3969	Caio Bonfim; Brazil	3920	Brian Pintado; Ecuador	3887
2023	Caio Bonfim; Brazil	4075	Perseus Karlström; Sweden	4032	Brian Pintado; Ecuador	4008
2024	Caio Bonfim; Brazil	4072	Brian Pintado; Ecuador	4068	Álvaro Martín; Spain	4035

=== Women ===
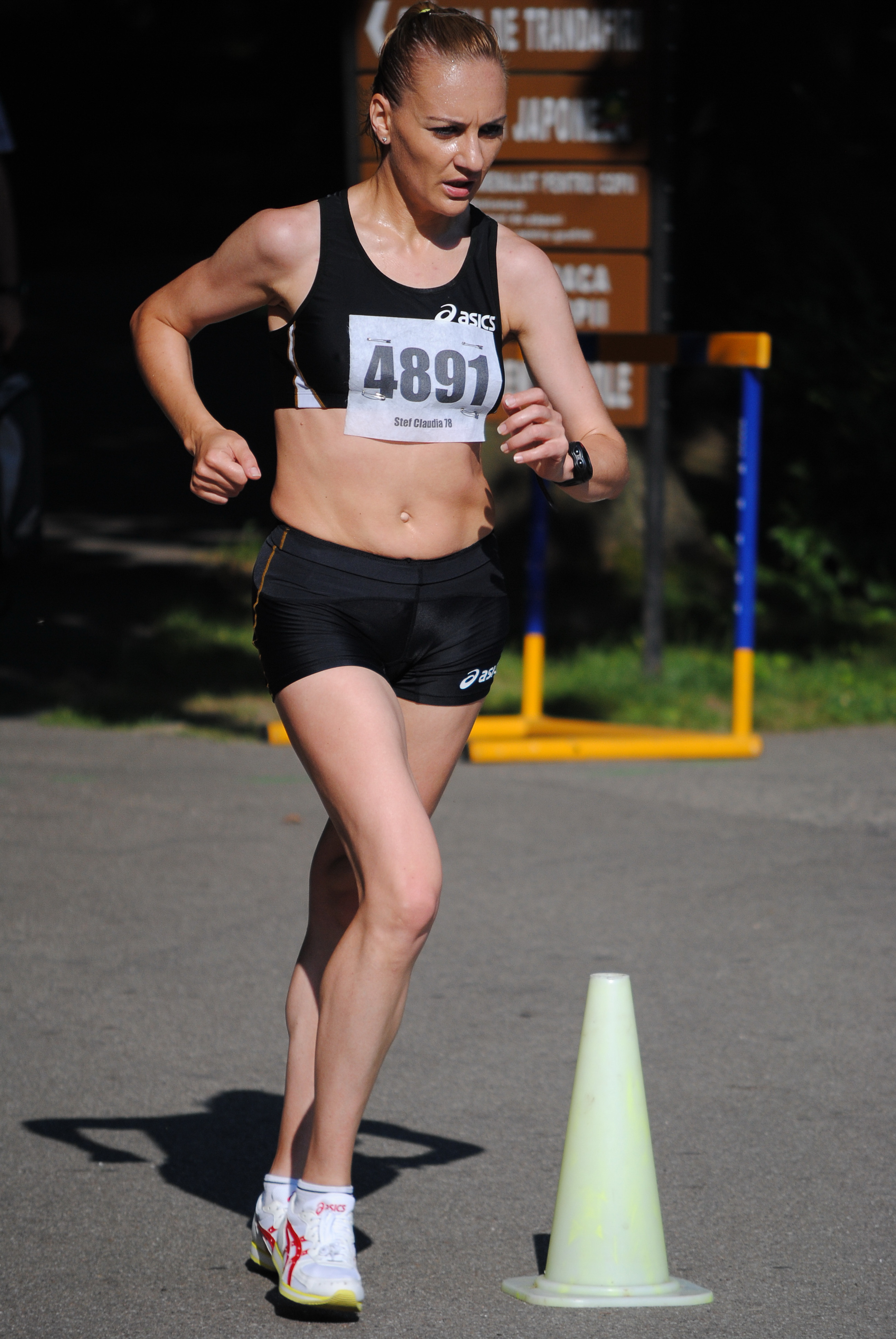
Claudia Ștef had minor placings before winning the 2006 series

Year	Gold		Silver		Bronze	
2003	Gillian O'Sullivan; Ireland	29	Kjersti Plätzer; Norway	24	Elisabetta Perrone; Italy	22
2004	Elisa Rigaudo; Italy	30	Claudia Ștef; Romania	26	María Vasco; Spain	24
2005	Ryta Turava; Belarus	29	Susana Feitor; Portugal	24	Claudia Ștef; Romania	22
2006	Claudia Ștef; Romania	28	Ryta Turava; Belarus	20	Jane Saville; Australia	18
2007	Ryta Turava; Belarus	40	Kjersti Plätzer; Norway	37	Sabine Zimmer; Germany	27
2008	Kjersti Plätzer; Norway	44	Athanasia Tsoumeleka; Greece	38	Claudia Ștef; Romania	26
2009	Kjersti Plätzer; Norway	48	Olive Loughnane; Ireland	26	Elisa Rigaudo; Italy	28
2010	Vera Santos; Portugal	40	Melanie Seeger; Germany	30	Inês Henriques; Portugal	25
2011	Olga Kaniskina; Russia	44	Liu Hong; China	34	Melanie Seeger; Germany	10
2012	Liu Hong; China	36	Beatriz Pascual; Spain	32	Lü Xiuzhi; China	30
2013	Elena Lashmanova; Russia	38	Inês Henriques; Portugal	34	Ana Cabecinha; Portugal	23
2014	Liu Hong; China	34	Eleonora Giorgi; Italy	23	Ana Cabecinha; Portugal	22
2015	Liu Hong; China	40	Eleonora Giorgi; Italy	27	Érica de Sena; Brazil	25
2016	Maria Guadalupe González; Mexico Qieyang Shijie; China	34	Not awarded		Eleonora Giorgi; Italy	32
2017	Érica de Sena; Brazil	34	Maria Guadalupe González; Mexico	28	Inês Henriques; Portugal	24
2018	Qieyang Shijie; China	34	Érica de Sena; Brazil	23	Inês Henriques; Portugal	22
2019	Qieyang Shijie; China	34	Liu Hong; China	32	Érica de Sena; Brazil	22
2022	Kimberly García; Peru	4040	Qieyang Shijie; China	3999	Jemima Montag; Australia	3864
2023	Kimberly García; Peru	4092	Alegna González; Mexico	3881	Jemima Montag; Australia	3864
2024	Yang Jiayu; China	3998	Jemima Montag; Australia	3938	Kimberly García; Peru	3901

== See also ==
- World Athletics Combined Events Tour
- IAAF World Cross Challenge
