= 2011 IAAF Race Walking Challenge =

International race walking competition

The 2011 IAAF Race Walking Challenge was the 9th edition of the annual international race walking competition organised by the International Association of Athletics Federations (IAAF). Ten meetings were scheduled for the competition: the race walk events at the 2011 World Championships in Athletics, five IAAF permit meetings, and four area permit meetings.

Athletes who gained enough points from competing at these meetings were entered into the IAAF Race Walking Challenge Final, where they competed for a total pot of US $200,000 in prize money. Reigning Olympic champions Valeriy Borchin and Olga Kaniskina won the final race and the series.

== Calendar ==
The following ten meetings, as well as the competition final, formed the schedule of the 2011 Race Walking Challenge. The "A" category meetings are worth the most points, with progressively fewer points being available through the "B" and "C" categories.

Date	Meeting	Category	Events	Venue	Country	Report
19 February	Australian 20k Racewalking Championships	C	20 km (Men/Women)	Hobart	Australia	
5 March	IAAF Permit Chihuahua	C	20 km (Men/Women); 50 km (Men)	Chihuahua City	Mexico	
20 March	Gran Premio Citta di Lugano – Memorial Mario Albisetti	C	20 km (Men/Women)	Lugano	Switzerland	
26 March	Dudinska 50-ka	C	10 km (Women); 20 km (Men); 50 km (Men)	Dudince	Slovakia	
9 April	Grande Premio Internacional en Marcha Atletica	B	20 km (Men/Women)	Rio Maior	Portugal	
22 April	IAAF Permit Taicang	B	10 km (Men/Women)	Taicang	China	
1 May	Coppa Città di Sesto San Giovanni	B	20 km (Men/Women)	Sesto San Giovanni	Italy	
26 June	Dublin International Racewalking GP	C	20 km (Men/Women)	Dublin	Ireland	
27 August – 4 September	2011 World Championships in Athletics	A	20 km (Men/Women); 50 km (Men)	Daegu	South Korea	
17 September	IAAF Race Walking Challenge Final	B	10 km (Men/Women)	A Coruña	Spain	

== Winners ==
#	Meeting	Men's winners			Women's winners	
#	Meeting	10 km	20 km	50 km	10 km	20 km
1	Hobart		Jared Tallent (AUS)			Claire Tallent (AUS)
2	Chihuahua		Eder Sánchez (MEX)	José Leyver Ojeda (MEX)		Inês Henriques (POR)
3	Lugano		Wang Zhen (CHN)			Liu Hong (CHN)
4	Dudince		Andriy Kovenko (UKR)	Matej Tóth (SVK)		Olive Loughnane (IRL)
5	Rio Maior		Valeriy Borchin (RUS)			Olga Kaniskina (RUS)
6	Taicang		Wang Zhen (CHN)	Si Tianfeng (CHN)		Liu Hong (CHN)
7	Sesto San Giovanni		Valeriy Borchin (RUS)			Olga Kaniskina (RUS)
8	Dublin		Wang Zhen (CHN)	Antti Kempas (FIN)		Liu Hong (CHN)
9	Daegu		Valeriy Borchin (RUS)	Sergey Bakulin (RUS)		Olga Kaniskina (RUS)
10	A Coruña	Valeriy Borchin (RUS)			Olga Kaniskina (RUS)	
Overall points winner		Valeriy Borchin (RUS)			Olga Kaniskina (RUS)	
