= 2009 World Championships in Athletics – Women's 20 kilometres walk =

The Women's 20 km Walk event at the 2009 World Championships in Athletics was held throughout the city of Berlin on August 16, beginning and ending at the Brandenburg Gate.

Undefeated since May 2007, the Olympic and World champion Olga Kaniskina was a clear favourite. Russian champion and second fastest of the year Vera Sokolova was predicted as a possible medallist, as were Sabine Krantz and Kjersti Platzer who had both won on the racewalking circuit prior to the competition. Amongst the other fastest athletes before the championships were Russians Anisya Kirdyapkina and Larisa Emelyanova, while Olympic medallist Elisa Rigaudo and Universiade medallist Masumi Fuchise were suggested as other contenders for the podium.

Competing on the course along the Unter den Linden boulevard, German Sabine Krantz led early on, but dropped out halfway into the race, and Norwegian Platzer was disqualified with five kilometres to go. Kaniskina emerged as the clear winner, becoming the first woman to win the racewalking gold in consecutive championships. Forty-nine seconds behind her was the surprise silver medallist Olive Loughnane, who won Ireland's first championship medal since 2003, and her first ever medal at a major championships. Liu Hong took the bronze, while Russian teenager Kirdyapkina took fourth place.

Kaniskina's victory completed a Russian men's and women's 20 km double with Valeriy Borchin, and she received a winner's prize of $60,000 for her achievement. Her win highlighted her success in an event in which she had won an Olympic gold, two World Championships titles, and a gold in the World Cup in just three years.

On January 15, 2015, Kaniskina's results were disqualified for doping violations. Most of the athletes coached by Viktor Chegin have received similar bans. On July 6, 2016, Loughnane will receive the gold medal in a full ceremony at the 2016 European Athletics Championships.

== Medalists ==
Gold	Silver	Bronze
Olive Loughnane; Ireland	Liu Hong; China	Anisya Kirdyapkina; Russia

== Records ==
World record	Olimpiada Ivanova (RUS)	1:25:41	Helsinki, Finland	7 August 2005
Championship record	Olimpiada Ivanova (RUS)	1:25:41	Helsinki, Finland	7 August 2005
World leading	Olga Kaniskina (RUS)	1:24:56	Adler, Russia	28 February 2009
African record	Susan Vermeulen (RSA)	1:36:18	Mézidon-Canon, France	2 May 1999
Asian record	Wang Yan (CHN)	1:26:22	Guangzhou, China	19 November 2001
North American record	Graciela Mendoza (MEX)	1:30:03	Mézidon-Canon, France	2 May 1999
South American record	Miriam Ramón (ECU)	1:31:25	Lima, Peru	7 May 2005
European record	Olimpiada Ivanova (RUS)	1:25:41	Helsinki, Finland	7 August 2005
Oceanian record	Jane Saville (AUS)	1:27:44	Naumburg, Germany	2 May 2004

== Qualification standards ==
A time	B time
1:33:30	1:38:00

== Schedule ==
Date	Time	Round
August 16, 2009	12:00	Final

== Results ==
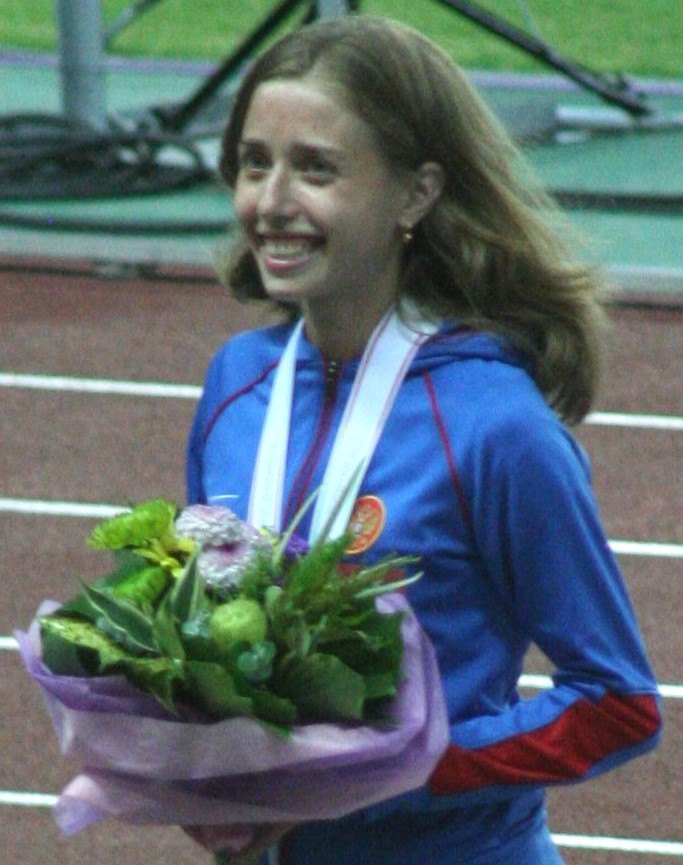
Olga Kaniskina defended her 20 km walk World Championships title but was later disqualified on doping offenses

Rank	Athlete	Nationality	Time	Notes
DSQ	Olga Kaniskina	Russia	~~1:28:09~~	
1st place, gold medalist(s)	Olive Loughnane	Ireland	1:28:58	SB
2nd place, silver medalist(s)	Liu Hong	China	1:29:10	SB
3rd place, bronze medalist(s)	Anisya Kirdyapkina	Russia	1:30:09	
5	Vera Santos	Portugal	1:30:35	
6	Beatriz Pascual	Spain	1:30:40	
7	Masumi Fuchise	Japan	1:31:15	
8	Kristina Saltanovič	Lithuania	1:31:23	SB
9	Elisa Rigaudo	Italy	1:31:52	
10	Susana Feitor	Portugal	1:32:04	
11	Inês Henriques	Portugal	1:32:51	
12	Kumi Otoshi	Japan	1:33:05	
13	Larisa Emelyanova	Russia	1:34:31	
14	Vera Sokolova	Russia	1:34:35	
15	Sniazhana Yurchanka	Belarus	1:34:57	
16	Ana Maria Groza	Romania	1:35:19	
17	Valentina Trapletti	Italy	1:35:33	SB
18	Yang Mingxia	China	1:35:42	
19	Zuzana Schindlerová	Czech Republic	1:35:47	
20	Tania Regina Spindler	Brazil	1:35:51	
21	Evaggelía Xinoú	Greece	1:35:56	
22	Jess Rothwell	Australia	1:36:01	
23	Claudia Stef	Romania	1:36:09	
24	Brigita Virbalytė	Lithuania	1:36:28	
25	Marie Polli	Switzerland	1:36:44	
26	Zuzana Malíková	Slovakia	1:37:47	
27	Claire Tallent	Australia	1:38:12	
28	Agnieszka Dygacz	Poland	1:38:36	
29	Alessandra Picagevicz	Brazil	1:38:50	
30	Geovana Irusta	Bolivia	1:39:16	
31	Chaima Trabelsi	Tunisia	1:39:50	
32	Svetlana Tolstaya	Kazakhstan	1:40:41	SB
33	Johana Ordóñez	Ecuador	1:42:27	
34	Anamaria Greceanu	Romania	1:43:35	
35	Rachel Lavallée	Canada	1:45:45	
36	Olha Yakovenko	Ukraine	1:45:55	
37	Cristina López	El Salvador	1:47:33	SB
	Cheryl Webb	Australia	DQ	
	Johanna Jackson	Great Britain & N.I.	DQ	
	María Hatzipanayiotídou	Greece	DQ	
	Yang Yawei	China	DQ	
	Monica Svensson	Sweden	DQ	
	Mária Gáliková	Slovakia	DQ	
	Mayumi Kawasaki	Japan	DQ	
	Kjersti Plätzer	Norway	DQ	
	María Vasco	Spain	DNF	
	Teresa Vaill	United States	DNF	
	Sabine Krantz	Germany	DNF	

DNF = did not finish | DNS = did not start | DQ = disqualification | NM = no mark (i.e. no valid result) | Q = qualification by place in heat | q = qualification by overall place
