= 2000 European Race Walking Cup =

- Organisers: EAA
- Edition: 3rd
- Date: June 17–18
- Host city: Eisenhüttenstadt, Brandenburg, Germany
- Events: 5
- Participation: 278 athletes from 26 nations

The third edition of the European Race Walking Cup took place in the German city of Eisenhüttenstadt on Saturday June 17 and Sunday June 18, 2000. For the first time, 10 km races for junior athletes (U20) were held. Complete results were published. The junior events are documented on the World Junior Athletics History webpages. Medal winners were published on the Athletics Weekly website,

== Medallists ==
Event	Gold		Silver		Bronze	
Men
20 km	Robert Korzeniowski (POL)	1:18:29	Andreas Erm (GER)	1:18:42	Paquillo Fernández (ESP)	1:18:56
50 km	Jesús Angel García (ESP)	3:42:51	Yevgeniy Shmalyuk (RUS)	3:44:43	Denis Langlois (FRA)	3:47:38
10 km (Junior)	Aleksandr Kuzmin (BLR)	41:16	Jan Albrecht (GER)	41:17	André Katzinski (GER)	41:59
Team (Men)
20 km	Spain	32 pts	Poland	35 pts	Germany	43 pts
50 km	France	12 pts	Spain	15 pts	Germany	30 pts
10 km Junior	Germany	5 pts	Belarus	5 pts	Italy	15 pts
Women
20 km	Olimpiada Ivanova (RUS)	1:26:48	Elisabetta Perrone (ITA)	1:27:42	Kjersti Plätzer (NOR)	1:27:53
10 km Junior	Tatyana Kozlova (RUS)	45:28	Marina Tikhonova (BLR)	45:33	Alena Zenkova (RUS)	45:35
Team (Women)
20 km	Italy	11 pts	Romania	29 pts	Ukraine	38 pts
10 km Junior	Russia	4 pts	Belarus	11 pts	Germany	18 pts

== Abbreviations ==
- All times shown are in hours:minutes:seconds

DNS	did not start
NM	no mark
WR	world record
WL	world leading
AR	area record
NR	national record
PB	personal best
SB	season best

== Men's results ==
=== 20 km walk ===
- Held on Saturday June 17, 2000.

Rank	Athlete	Time	Note
1st place, gold medalist(s)	Robert Korzeniowski (POL)	1:18:29	
2nd place, silver medalist(s)	Andreas Erm (GER)	1:18:42	
3rd place, bronze medalist(s)	Paquillo Fernández (ESP)	1:18:56	
4	Jiří Malysa (CZE)	1:19:18	
5	Dmitriy Yesipchuk (RUS)	1:19:56	
6	Aigars Fadejevs (LAT)	1:20:18	
7	Tomasz Lipiec (POL)	1:20:48	
8	Artur Meleshkevich (BLR)	1:20:53	
9	Valentin Kononen (FIN)	1:21:09	
10	Anthony Gillet (FRA)	1:21:28	
11	Giovanni De Benedictis (ITA)	1:21:43	
12	Costică Bălan (ROM)	1:21:43	
13	David Márquez (ESP)	1:21:44	
14	Michele Didoni (ITA)	1:21:51	
15	Igor Kollár (SVK)	1:22:25	
16	José David Domínguez (ESP)	1:22:34	
17	Denis Nizhegorodov (RUS)	1:22:40	
18	Robert Heffernan (IRL)	1:22:43	
19	Arturo Di Mezza (ITA)	1:22:46	
20	Robert Ihly (GER)	1:23:00	
21	Nischan Daimer (GER)	1:23:14	
22	Miloš Holuša (CZE)	1:23:24	
23	Silviu Casandra (ROM)	1:23:51	
24	Birger Fält (SWE)	1:24:48	
25	Andriy Kovenko (UKR)	1:24:49	
26	Theódoros Stamatopoulos (GRE)	1:24:57	
27	Grzegorz Sudol (POL)	1:25:02	
28	Peter Korčok (SVK)	1:25:11	
29	Róbert Valíček (SVK)	1:25:14	
30	Daugvinas Zujus (LTU)	1:25:27	
31	Leonid Mizernyuk (UKR)	1:25:46	
32	Maris Putenis (LAT)	1:25:50	
33	Gyula Dudás (HUN)	1:25:53	
34	(Serbia and Montenegro) Predrag Filipović YUG	1:26:04	
35	Spirídon Kastanis (GRE)	1:26:19	
36	Erik Tysse (NOR)	1:26:35	
37	Elefthérios Thanópoulos (GRE)	1:26:42	
38	Milos Batovský (CZE)	1:27:03	
39	Sébastian Biché (FRA)	1:27:06	
40	Ivan Azarenok (BLR)	1:27:16	
41	Anatoliy Malivskiy (UKR)	1:27:36	
42	Henri Davaux (FRA)	1:27:37	
43	(Serbia and Montenegro) Aleksandar Raković YUG	1:27:42	
44	Vladimir Stankin (RUS)	1:28:25	
45	Claus Jørgensen (DEN)	1:28:48	
46	(Serbia and Montenegro) Nenad Filipović YUG	1:28:56	
47	Aivars Kadaks (LAT)	1:30:37	
48	Yeóryios Aryirópoulos (GRE)	1:31:16	
49	Chris Maddocks (GBR)	1:31:39	
50	Andrew Penn (GBR)	1:33:10	
51	János Tóth (HUN)	1:34:28	
52	Heikki Kinnunen (FIN)	1:35:26	
53	Anatolijus Launikonys (LTU)	1:35:28	
54	Arto Matilainen (FIN)	1:35:46	
55	Aleksandrs Danulevicius (LTU)	1:38:04	
56	Snorre Utåker (NOR)	1:39:51	
57	Yann Banderer (SUI)	1:40:36	
58	Olivier Bianchi (SUI)	1:46:08	
59	Claude Berner (SUI)	1:50:43	
DID NOT FINISH (DNF)
—	Pekka Matilainen (FIN)	DNF	
DISQUALIFIED (DSQ)
—	Yevgeniy Misyulya (BLR)	DSQ	
—	Andrey Makarov (BLR)	DSQ	
—	Darrell Stone (GBR)	DSQ	
—	Andi Drake (GBR)	DSQ	
—	Sándor Urbanik (HUN)	DSQ	

==== Team (20 km Men) ====
Place	Country	Points
1st place, gold medalist(s)	Spain	32 pts
2nd place, silver medalist(s)	Poland	35 pts
3rd place, bronze medalist(s)	Germany	43 pts
4	Italy	45 pts
5	Russia	66 pts
6	Slovakia	72 pts
7	Latvia	85 pts
8	France	91 pts
9	Ukraine	97 pts
10	Greece	98 pts
11	Finland	117 pts
12	(Serbia and Montenegro) Yugoslavia	123 pts
13	Lithuania	140 pts
14	Switzerland	177 pts

=== 50 km walk ===
- Held on Sunday June 18, 2000.

Rank	Athlete	Time	Note
1st place, gold medalist(s)	Jesús Angel García (ESP)	3:42:51	
2nd place, silver medalist(s)	Yevgeniy Shmalyuk (RUS)	3:44:33	
3rd place, bronze medalist(s)	Denis Langlois (FRA)	3:47:38	
4	René Piller (FRA)	3:47:49	
5	Sylvain Caudron (FRA)	3:48:09	
6	Mario Avellaneda (ESP)	3:49:50	
7	Denis Trautmann (GER)	3:50:28	
8	Santiago Pérez (ESP)	3:51:24	
9	Francesco Galdenzi (ITA)	3:53:01	
10	Trond Nymark (NOR)	3:53:24	
11	Mike Trautmann (GER)	3:53:57	
12	Thomas Wallstab (GER)	3:54:20	
13	Alessandro Mistretta (ITA)	3:54:38	
14	David Boulanger (FRA)	3:56:52	
15	Štefan Malík (SVK)	3:57:25	
16	Jacob Sørensen (DEN)	3:58:09	
17	Jamie Costin (IRL)	3:59:02	
18	Oleksiy Shelest (UKR)	3:59:27	
19	Zoltán Czukor (HUN)	4:01:16	
20	Virgilio Soares (POR)	4:01:27	
21	Benjamin Leroy (BEL)	4:01:46	
22	Marek Janek (SVK)	4:02:42	
23	Pedro Martins (POR)	4:03:28	
24	Fredrik Svensson (SWE)	4:03:42	
25	Peter Ferrarri (SWE)	4:04:34	
26	Anton Trotskiy (BLR)	4:04:58	
27	Uģis Brūvelis (LAT)	4:06:55	
28	Steven Hollier (GBR)	4:07:18	
29	Pascal Charriere (SUI)	4:07:59	
30	Aleksandr Andrushevskiy (BLR)	4:08:35	
31	Aleksey Voyevodin (RUS)	4:10:40	
32	Vitaliy Popovich (UKR)	4:10:40	
33	Aleksei Nasibulin (BLR)	4:10:52	
34	Yuriy Burban (UKR)	4:11:36	
35	Jorge Costa (POR)	4:13:11	
36	Sergejs Lapsa (LAT)	4:15:19	
37	Kazimír Verkin (SVK)	4:15:38	
38	Ruslan Lazorkin (UKR)	4:17:00	
39	Oleg Ishutkin (RUS)	4:17:43	
40	Massimo Passoni (ITA)	4:18:46	
41	Juris Gjacs (LAT)	4:20:11	
42	Marcel van Gemert (NED)	4:22:02	
43	Chris Cheeseman (GBR)	4:23:19	
44	Attila Fülop (HUN)	4:32:12	
45	Don Bearman (GBR)	4:36:15	
46	Don Buffet (SUI)	4:43:55	
47	Bernard Cossy (SUI)	4:52:19	
48	Robert Tupak (HUN)	4:57:48	
49	Jean-Claude Zaugg (SUI)	4:59:58	
DID NOT FINISH (DNF)
—	Tim Watt (GBR)	DNF	
—	Axel Noack (GER)	DNF	
—	Jeff Cassin (IRL)	DNF	
—	Robert Heffernan (IRL)	DNF	
—	Ivano Brugnetti (ITA)	DNF	
—	Vyaceslavs Grigoryevs (LAT)	DNF	
—	Stanislaw Stosik (POL)	DNF	
—	José Magalhães (POR)	DNF	
—	Andrey Plotnikov (RUS)	DNF	
—	Peter Tichý (SVK)	DNF	
—	José Manuel Rodríguez (ESP)	DNF	
—	Bengt Bengtsson (SWE)	DNF	
—	Bo Gustavsson (SWE)	DNF	
—	Jani Lehtinen (FIN)	DNF	
DISQUALIFIED (DSQ)
—	Vitaliy Gordey (BLR)	DSQ	
—	Klaus David Jensen (DEN)	DSQ	
—	Gábor Lengyel (HUN)	DSQ	
—	Pedro Huntjens (NED)	DSQ	

==== Team (50 km Men) ====
Place	Country	Points
1st place, gold medalist(s)	France	12 pts
2nd place, silver medalist(s)	Spain	15 pts
3rd place, bronze medalist(s)	Germany	30 pts
4	Italy	62 pts
5	Russia	72 pts
6	Slovakia	74 pts
7	Portugal	78 pts
8	Ukraine	84 pts
9	Belarus	89 pts
10	Latvia	104 pts
11	Hungary	111 pts
12	United Kingdom	116 pts
13	Switzerland	122 pts

=== Junior 10 km walk ===
- Only the first ten are listed below

Rank	Athlete	Time	Note
1st place, gold medalist(s)	Alexander Kuzmin (BLR)	41:16	
2nd place, silver medalist(s)	Jan Albrecht (GER)	41:17	
3rd place, bronze medalist(s)	André Katzinski (GER)	41:59	
4	Sergey Ostapuk (BLR)	42:04	
5	Benjamin Kuciński (POL)	42:11	
6	Patrick Ennemoser (ITA)	42:24	
7	Aleksandr Strokov (RUS)	42:29	
8	Frank Werner (GER)	42:33	
9	Paul Gassebner (ITA)	42:40	
10	Ivano Medagli (ITA)	42:51	
11	Mieszko Lyp (POL)	42:56	
12	Tomas Cambal (CZE)	42:58	
13	Grzegorz Borgiel (POL)	43:00	
14	Radek Pařízek (CZE)	43:16	
15	Yevgeniy Demkov (RUS)	43:21	
16	Iustin Tatarau (ROU)	43:22	
17	Paraskevas Vandoros (GRE)	43:43	
18	Matej Tóth (SVK)	43:49	
19	Andrei Talashka (BLR)	43:58	
20	Alexis Spizopoulos (GRE)	44:02	
21	Jesús Tomero (ESP)	44:05	
22	Theodors Koupidis (GRE)	44:09	
23	Denis Shalgin (RUS)	44:17	
24	Florian Jourda (FRA)	44:19	
25	Viktor Jansson (SWE)	44:47	
26	Catalin Hogea (ROU)	45:02	
27	Dominic King (GBR)	45:03	
28	Alexandre Jacques (ESP)	45:06	
29	Andreas Gustaffsson (SWE)	45:15	
30	Eero Turpeinen (FIN)	45:20	
31	Lloyd Finch (GBR)	45:29	
32	Cédric Jumelin (FRA)	45:45	
33	Jozef Hudec (SVK)	46:31	
34	Nicolas Perrier (SUI)	46:48	
35	Ferenc Papp (HUN)	47:00	
36	Romualdas Beliakas (LTU)	47:34	
37	Saulius Taraskevičius (LTU)	47:38	
38	Benoît Beclin (FRA)	47:41	
39	Thomas Taylor (GBR)	48:55	
40	Bruno Grandjean (SUI)	48:59	
—	Aleksejus Danulevičius (LTU)	DQ	

==== Team (10 km Junior Men) ====
Place	Country	Points
1st place, gold medalist(s)	Germany	5 pts
2nd place, silver medalist(s)	Belarus	5 pts
3rd place, bronze medalist(s)	Italy	15 pts
4	Poland	16 pts
5	Russia	22 pts
6	Slovakia	30 pts
7	Greece	37 pts
8	Romania	42 pts
9	Spain	49 pts
10	Sweden	54 pts
11	France	56 pts
12	United Kingdom	58 pts
13	Lithuania	73 pts
14	Switzerland	74 pts

== Women's results ==
=== 20 km walk ===
- Held on Saturday June 17, 2000.

Rank	Athlete	Time	Note
1st place, gold medalist(s)	Olimpiada Ivanova (RUS)	1:26:48	
2nd place, silver medalist(s)	Elisabetta Perrone (ITA)	1:27:42	
3rd place, bronze medalist(s)	Kjersti Plätzer (NOR)	1:27:53	
4	Erica Alfridi (ITA)	1:28:06	
5	Annarita Sidoti (ITA)	1:28:38	
6	Norica Câmpean (ROM)	1:28:59	
7	Valentyna Savchuk (UKR)	1:29:16	
8	Valentina Tsybulskaya (BLR)	1:30:19	
9	Cristiana Pellino (ITA)	1:30:42	
10	Ana Maria Groza (ROM)	1:31:08	
11	Noka Leksir (FRA)	1:31:15	
12	Mária Urbanik (HUN)	1:31:21	
13	Daniela Cirlan (ROM)	1:31:30	
14	Gillian O'Sullivan (IRL)	1:31:31	
15	Vira Zozulya (UKR)	1:31:40	
16	Lyudmila Yegorova (UKR)	1:32:02	
17	Tatyana Ragozina (UKR)	1:32:17	
18	Eva Pérez (ESP)	1:32:24	
19	Kristina Saltanovic (LTU)	1:32:48	
20	Larisa Khmelnitskaya (BLR)	1:32:53	
21	Tamara Kovalenko (RUS)	1:33:07	
22	Encarnación Granados (ESP)	1:33:36	
23	Lisa Kehler (GBR)	1:33:57	
24	Kathrin Boyde (GER)	1:34:13	
25	Anita Liepina (LAT)	1:34:26	
26	Anne Haaland Simonsen (NOR)	1:34:34	
27	Olga Kardopoltseva (BLR)	1:34:53	
28	Beate Gummelt (GER)	1:34:57	
29	Olive Loughnane (IRL)	1:34:59	
30	Hristina Kokotou (GRE)	1:34:59	
31	Alexandra Tziouti (GRE)	1:35:03	
32	Zuzana Blažeková (SVK)	1:35:07	
33	Sonata Milušauskaitė (LTU)	1:35:13	
34	Melanie Seeger (GER)	1:35:26	
35	Athina Papayianni (GRE)	1:35:29	
36	Yuliya Voyevodina (RUS)	1:37:01	
37	Rocío Florido (ESP)	1:38:21	
38	Valerie Nadaud (FRA)	1:38:39	
39	Anna Zvarová (SVK)	1:39:17	
40	Jurgita Meškauskiene (LTU)	1:39:22	
41	Sofia Avoia (POR)	1:40:27	
42	Inês Henriques (POR)	1:41:19	
43	Mária Gáliková (SVK)	1:41:20	
44	Outi Sillanpäa (FIN)	1:41:24	
45	Isilda Gonçalves (POR)	1:42:07	
46	Niobe Menéndez (GBR)	1:43:18	
47	Diana Leoke (LAT)	1:44:14	
48	Lucie Nedomová (CZE)	1:44:44	
49	Marie Polli (SUI)	1:46:14	
50	Kim Braznell (GBR)	1:46:24	
51	Henrieta Rusnakova (SVK)	1:46:46	
52	Anita Benkő (HUN)	1:48:00	
53	Dana Vavřačová (CZE)	1:48:59	
DID NOT FINISH (DNF)
—	Anett Amberg (GER)	DNF	
—	Mónika Pesti (HUN)	DNF	
—	Jolanta Dukure (LAT)	DNF	
—	Nadezhda Ryashkina (RUS)	DNF	
—	Sara Jane Cattermole (GBR)	DNF	
—	Tatiana Boulanger (FRA)	DNF	
—	Fatiha Ouali (FRA)	DNF	
—	Susana Feitor (POR)	DNF	
—	María Vasco (ESP)	DNF	
—	Siw Ibáñez (SWE)	DNF	
—	Lyudmila Dolgopolova (BLR)	DNF	
DISQUALIFIED (DSQ)
—	Elin Cecile Løftesnes (NOR)	DSQ	

==== Team (20 km Women) ====
Place	Country	Points
1st place, gold medalist(s)	Italy	11 pts
2nd place, silver medalist(s)	Romania	29 pts
3rd place, bronze medalist(s)	Ukraine	38 pts
4	Belarus	55 pts
5	Russia	58 pts
6	Spain	77 pts
7	Germany	86 pts
8	Lithuania	92 pts
9	Greece	96 pts
10	Slovakia	114 pts
11	United Kingdom	119 pts
12	Portugal	128 pts

=== Junior 10 km walk ===
- Only the first ten are listed below

Rank	Athlete	Time	Note
1st place, gold medalist(s)	Tatyana Kozlova (RUS)	45:28	
2nd place, silver medalist(s)	Marina Tikhonova (BLR)	45:33	
3rd place, bronze medalist(s)	Alena Zenkova (RUS)	45:35	
4	Sabine Zimmer (GER)	46:01	
5	Tatyana Dotsenko (RUS)	46:39	
6	Beatriz Pascual (ESP)	46:44	
7	Alina Olaru (ROM)	47:08	
8	Vera Santos (POR)	47:22	
9	Sniazhana Yurchanka (BLR)	47:23	
10	Athanasia Tsoumeleka (GRE)	47:25	
11	Zuzana Malíková (SVK)	47:25	
12	Melissa Rodriguez (FRA)	47:33	
13	Carla Monteiro (POR)	47:54	
14	Stephanie Panzig (GER)	48:06	
15	Evaggelia Xinou (GRE)	48:28	
16	Francesca Balloni (ITA)	48:31	
17	Agnieszka Bator (POL)	48:40	
18	Tatyana Zuyeva (BLR)	48:41	
19	Edina Füsti (HUN)	48:42	
20	Barbora Dibelková (CZE)	49:39	
21	Aurélie Breton (FRA)	49:46	
22	Mária Raganová (SVK)	49:54	
23	Maria Baj (POL)	49:57	
24	Elżbieta Lepa (POL)	50:08	
25	Verónica Espino (ESP)	50:22	
26	Iratxe Pérez (ESP)	50:35	
27	María Hatzipanayiotídou (GRE)	51:10	
28	Sandra Eriksson (SWE)	51:31	
29	Virág Erdős (HUN)	51:47	
30	Veronika Daňová (SVK)	51:52	
31	Julie Goubault (FRA)	53:07	
32	Marja Penttinen (FIN)	53:24	
33	Helena Pospíšilová (CZE)	54:05	
34	Gabriella Papp (HUN)	54:18	
35	Laura Polli (SUI)	55:02	
36	Clare Reeves (GBR)	59:11	
—	Tiina Muinonen (FIN)	DNF	
—	Beatrice Klabuhn (GER)	DNF	

==== Team (10 km Junior Women) ====
Place	Country	Points
1st place, gold medalist(s)	Russia	4 pts
2nd place, silver medalist(s)	Belarus	11 pts
3rd place, bronze medalist(s)	Germany	18 pts
4	Portugal	21 pts
5	Greece	25 pts
6	Spain	31 pts
7	France	33 pts
8	Slovakia	33 pts
9	Poland	40 pts
10	Hungary	48 pts
11	Czech Republic	53 pts

== Participation ==
The participation of 278 athletes (175 men/103 women) from 26 countries is reported.

- Belarus (18)
- Belgium (1)
- Czech Republic (9)
- Denmark (3)
- Finland (9)
- France (18)
- Germany (17)
- Greece (13)
- Hungary (14)
- Ireland (6)
- Italy (15)
- Latvia (10)
- Lithuania (9)
- Netherlands (2)
- Norway (6)
- Poland (10)
- Portugal (10)
- Romania (8)
- Russia (17)
- Slovakia (16)
- Spain (17)
- Sweden (9)
- Switzerland (11)
- Ukraine (11)
- United Kingdom (16)
- (Serbia and Montenegro) Yugoslavia (3)

== See also ==
- 2000 Race Walking Year Ranking
