= Coppa Città di Sesto San Giovanni =

Racewalking competition

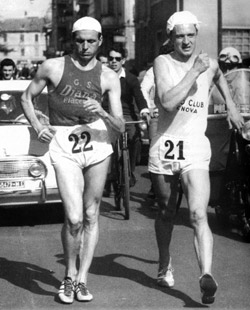
Pino Dordoni (left) and Abdon Pamich at the 1961 race.

The Coppa Città di Sesto San Giovanni is an annual racewalking competition that takes place on 1 May in Sesto San Giovanni in Italy. It is an elite level event which features a men's and a women's race in the 20 kilometres race walk.

Organised by Geas Atletica, it has been part of the IAAF World Race Walking Challenge – the highest seasonal level of the sport – since the series was inaugurated in 2003.

The competition was first established in 1957 as a men's only road walking competition. After various distances ranging from 25 to 32 kilometres in its initial years, the race settled on a 30 km distance from 1960 onwards. A women's race was included from 1980 onwards. The women's races were initially over 10 kilometres in the early history of that competition. The event's inclusion in the IAAF World Challenge series saw it adopt the standard Olympic distance of 20 km for both the men's and women's races. The race has been held every year since 1957 with the sole exception of 1995, where it was postponed due to organisational issues.

The course for the race is a looped circuit directly in the centre of the city. The main route alternates along the parallel roads of Via Fratelli Bandiera and Via Giuseppe Rovani and the finishing point is a lap of the track and field stadium at the western end of the roads.

== Past winners ==
Key: Course record

=== Men's 30 km race era ===
Edition	Year	Men's winner	Time (h:m:s)
1st	1957	Pino Dordoni (ITA)	? (25K)
2nd	1958	Pino Dordoni (ITA)	2:13:08 (25K)
3rd	1959	Pino Dordoni (ITA)	2:47:22 (32K)
4th	1960	?	?
5th	1961	Abdon Pamich (ITA)	2:36:55
6th	1962	Abdon Pamich (ITA)	?
7th	1963	Abdon Pamich (ITA)	2:28:11
8th	1964	Abdon Pamich (ITA)	?
9th	1965	Abdon Pamich (ITA)	?
10th	1966	Abdon Pamich (ITA)	?
11th	1967	Abdon Pamich (ITA)	?
12th	1968	Peter Fullager (GBR)	2:25:02,4
13th	1969	Christoph Höhne (GDR)	2:27:47
14th	1970	Peter Selzer (GDR)	?
15th	1971	H Maier (FRG)	?
16th	1972	Nikolay Smaga (URS)	2:28:31
17th	1973	Bernhard Kannenberg (GER)	?
18th	1974	Bernhard Kannenberg (GER)	2:30:34
19th	1975	Franco Vecchio (ITA)	2:29:20
20th	1976	Karl-Heinz Stadtmüller (GDR)	?
21st	1977	Vittorio Visini (ITA)	2:25:40
22nd	1978	Sandro Bellucci (ITA)	2:24:21
23rd	1979	José Marín (ESP)	2:19:07

=== First men's and women's races ===
Edition	Year	Men's winner	Time (h:m:s)	Women's winner	Time (h:m:s)
24th	1980	Domenico Carpentieri (ITA)	2:22:28	Giuliana Salce (ITA)	? (5K)
25th	1981	Sandro Bellucci (ITA)	2:22:36	Carol Tyson (GBR)	?
26th	1982	Maurizio Damilano (ITA)	2:16:25	Ann Jansson (SWE)	24:16
27th	1983	José Marín (ESP)	2:18:14	Giuliana Salce (ITA)	24:09
28th	1984	Raffaello Ducceschi (ITA)	2:10:07	María Reyes Sobrino (ESP)	24:20
29th	1985	Jorge Llopart (ESP)	2:12:12	Ann Jansson (SWE)	46:59
30th	1986	Raffaello Ducceschi (ITA)	?	Olga Krishtop (URS)	?
31st	1987	Reima Salonen (FIN)	?	Kerry Saxby (AUS)	?
32nd	1988	Jozef Pribilinec (SVK)	2:09:49	Kerry Saxby (AUS)	45:18
33rd	1989	Maurizio Damilano (ITA)	?	Ileana Salvador (ITA)	44:24
34th	1990	Ernesto Canto (MEX)	2:08:49	Kerry Saxby (AUS)	44:31
35th	1991	Andrey Perlov (URS)	2:06:09	Olga Kardopoltseva (URS)	?
36th	1992	Giovanni Perricelli (ITA)	?	Ileana Salvador (ITA)	42:07
37th	1993	Mikhail Shchennikov (RUS)	?	Ileana Salvador (ITA)	?
38th	1994	Mikhail Shchennikov (RUS)	?	Annarita Sidoti (ITA)	42:45
—	1995	—	—	—	—
39th	1996	Aleksandar Raković (YUG)	?	Rossella Giordano (ITA)	42:36
40th	1997	Giovanni De Benedictis (ITA)	?	Annarita Sidoti (ITA)	?
41st	1998	Alessandro Gandellini (ITA)	1:22:01	Valentina Tsybulskaya (BLR)	43:47
42nd	1999	Ilya Markov (RUS)	39:01	Yelena Nikolayeva (RUS)	42:04
43rd	2000	Ilya Markov (RUS)	?	Elisabetta Perrone (ITA)	41:19
44th	2001	Marco Giungi (ITA)	?	Elisabetta Perrone (ITA)	43:07
45th	2002	Aigars Fadejevs (LAT)	2:06:13	Kjersti Plätzer (NOR)	43:35

=== IAAF-era (20 km) ===
Edition	Year	Men's winner	Time (h:m:s)	Women's winner	Time (h:m:s)
46th	2003	Paquillo Fernández (ESP)	1:19:25	Gillian O'Sullivan (IRL)	1:27:22
47th	2004	Alessandro Gandellini (ITA)	1:21:16	Elisa Rigaudo (ITA)	1:30:23
48th	2005	Paquillo Fernández (ESP)	1:19:54	Ryta Turava (BLR)	1:28:43
49th	2006	Ilya Markov (RUS)	1:20:28	Ryta Turava (BLR)	1:29:22
50th	2007	Erik Tysse (NOR)	1:21:38	Ryta Turava (BLR)	1:27:10
51st	2008	Jefferson Pérez (ECU)	1:20:31	Kjersti Plätzer (NOR)	1:30:07
52nd	2009	Paquillo Fernández (ESP)	1:19:57	Kjersti Plätzer (NOR)	1:28:50
53rd	2010	Alex Schwazer (ITA)	1:20:29	Vera Santos (POR)	1:28:29
54th	2011	Valeriy Borchin (RUS)	1:19:43	Olga Kaniskina (RUS)	1:29:32
55th	2012	Eder Sánchez (MEX)	1:24:52	Tatyana Sibileva (RUS)	1:30:35
56th	2013	Matej Tóth (SVK)	1:22:02	Elena Lashmanova (RUS)	1:32:07
