= Wang Zhen (race walker) =

Chinese racewalker (born 1991)

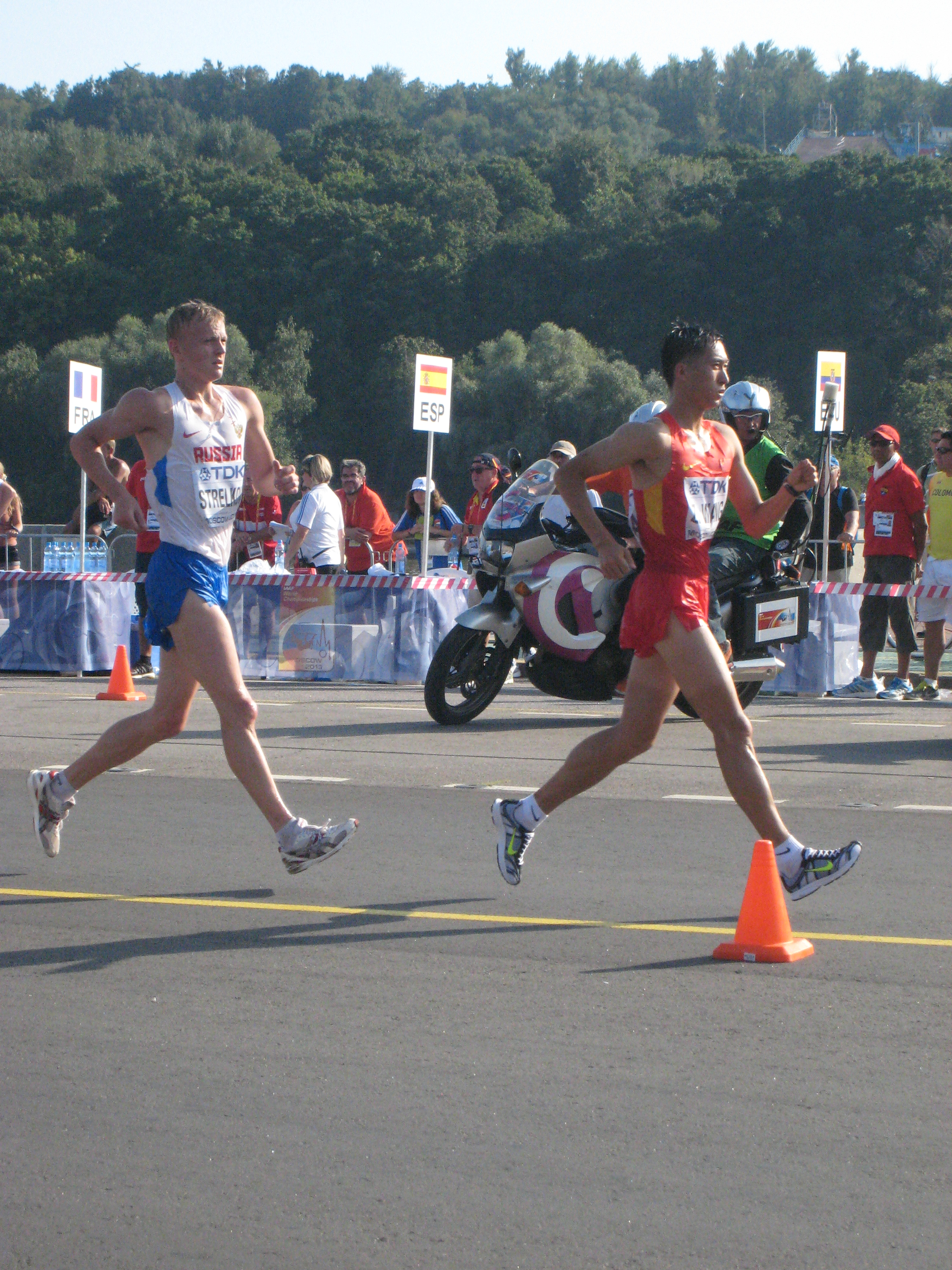
- Wang Zhen leading Denis Strelkov at the 2013 World Championships

Personal information
- Born: 24 August 1991 (age 35) Heilongjiang, China
- Height: 177 cm (5 ft 10 in)
- Weight: 63 kg (139 lb)

Sport
- Country: China
- Sport: Athletics
- Event: 20km Race Walk
- Coached by: Sandro Damilano
Medal record
Men's athletics
Representing China
Olympic Games
Gold medal – first place	2016 Rio de Janeiro	20 km walk
Bronze medal – third place	2012 London	20 km walk
World Championships
Silver medal – second place	2011 Daegu	20 km walk
Silver medal – second place	2015 Beijing	20 km walk
World Race Walking Cup
Gold medal – first place	2012 Saransk	20 km walk
Gold medal – first place	2016 Rome	20 km walk
Asian Games
Gold medal – first place	2014 Incheon	20 km walk

Wang Zhen (Chinese: 王镇; born 24 August 1991) is a Chinese race walker who specialises in the 10 kilometres and 20 kilometres race walk. He holds the senior Asian record for the 20 km with his time of 1:17:36 hours and is also the Asian, Chinese and junior world record holder over 10 km. He was the bronze medallist over 20 km at the 2012 London Olympics and the gold medallist at the 2016 Rio Olympics.

== Career ==
Born in Suihua, Wang began competing at the top level of the sport in 2008 and won the junior 30 km walk at the Chinese national race walking championships, finishing in 2:08:46. He competed in his first 50 kilometres race walk the year after at the 2009 Chinese National Games. The sixteen-year-old Wang managed sixth place in 3:53:00.

He took to the major international circuit the next year – the 2010 IAAF World Race Walking Challenge. At the Gran Premio Città di Lugano Memorial Albisetti he finished in sixth place, and then he walked to a personal best of 1:20:42 in the 20 km race at the Grande Premio Internacional en Marcha Atletica in Rio Maior, Portugal – a time worth third place at the meeting. He was seventh at the Coppa Città di Sesto San Giovanni in May, and managed 21st place over 20 km at the 2010 IAAF World Race Walking Cup (his first international championship). Having gained enough points on the circuit, he was entered into 10 km 2010 IAAF Race Walking Challenge Final and the race proved to be one of the quickest of all time, with four men walking 38 minutes and under. Wang Hao was the home favourite for the race in Beijing, but it was Wang Zhen who topped the podium. He finished the race in 37:44 minutes (the joint second fastest mark of all-time with Erik Tysse) which was a new Asian record, as well as being the world junior record for the distance.

He began his 2011 with a win at the Memorial Mario Albisetti in March and then in Taicang in April, twice improving his personal best to end with a 20 km record of 1:18:30 hours. He won 20 km walks in Dublin and London before going on to take fourth place that was retroactively upgraded to silver due to doping by the original gold and silver medallists in the event at the 2011 World Championships in Athletics. He ended the year with a runner-up finish behind Valeriy Borchin at the 2011 IAAF World Race Walking Challenge Final. His first race of 2012 was in Taicang and he broke the Asian record with a time of 1:17:36 hours – almost a minute improvement on his best.

He was chosen for the Chinese Olympic team and went on to secure the bronze medal in the 20 km walk. Finishing behind Chen Ding, he shared the honour of winning China's first ever Olympic medals in the event. He broke the Asian 10,000 m track walk record at the Chinese University Games later that year, knocking over half a minute of the former record with a time of 38:30.38 minutes.

His 2013 began with a win at the Memorial Albisetti.

He won the gold medal in 20 km race walk at the 2016 Rio Olympics on 12 August 2016.

== See also ==
- China at the 2012 Summer Olympics - Athletics
