= Grande Prémio Internacional de Rio Maior em Marcha Atlética =

- Date: April
- Location: Rio Maior, Portugal
- Event type: Racewalking
- Distance: 20km
- Established: 1991
- Course records: Men's: 1:18:55 (2011) (Russia) Valeriy Borchin; Women's: 1:27:19 (2005) (Belarus) Ryta Turava
- Website: G.P. de Rio Maior
- Participants: 32 (2022); 51 (2019)

The Grande Prémio Internacional de Rio Maior em Marcha Atlética (Rio Maior International Race Walking Grand Prix) is an annual racewalking competition that takes place in April in Rio Maior in Portugal. It is an elite level event which features a men's and a women's race in the 20 kilometres race walk.

== History ==
The event was first held in October 1991 with a 10 km racewalk for men and 5 km women's race. After hosting the 1992 Portuguese Racewalking Championships, the meeting began in its April schedule in 1993 and switched to a men's 20 km/women's 10 km format. This continued until 1999, at which point the women's race was increased to 20 km and has remained so (with the exception of the 2002 edition).

Since 2004, the competition has been part of the IAAF World Race Walking Challenge circuit – the top level meeting series for international racewalking. It is one of two professional level racewalking competitions in Portugal, alongside the Meeting de Marcha Atlética da Cidade de Olhão.

Several athletes have won the race multiple times: Portugal's Susana Feitor is an eight-time winner while Latvian Aigars Fadejevs is the most successful man with four wins. The race usually attracts walkers from Europe, China and Central America – the three regions that produce the most top level athletes. On the men's side, victors include Olympic champions Valeriy Borchin and Olympic silver medallists Aigars Fadejevs, Paquillo Fernández, and Ilya Markov. Among the women's winners are Olympic gold medallists Elena Lashmanova and Olga Kaniskina, world champions Sari Essayah and Hongyu Liu, and Olympic runners-up Elisabetta Perrone and Kjersti Plätzer.

The course route is on a loop in the town centre near the Praça da República (Republic Square) and alongside Parque 25 de Abril. The course records for the 20 km races are 1:18:55 hours set by Valeriy Borchin in 2011 and 1:27:19 hours set by Ryta Turava in 2005.

== Past winners ==
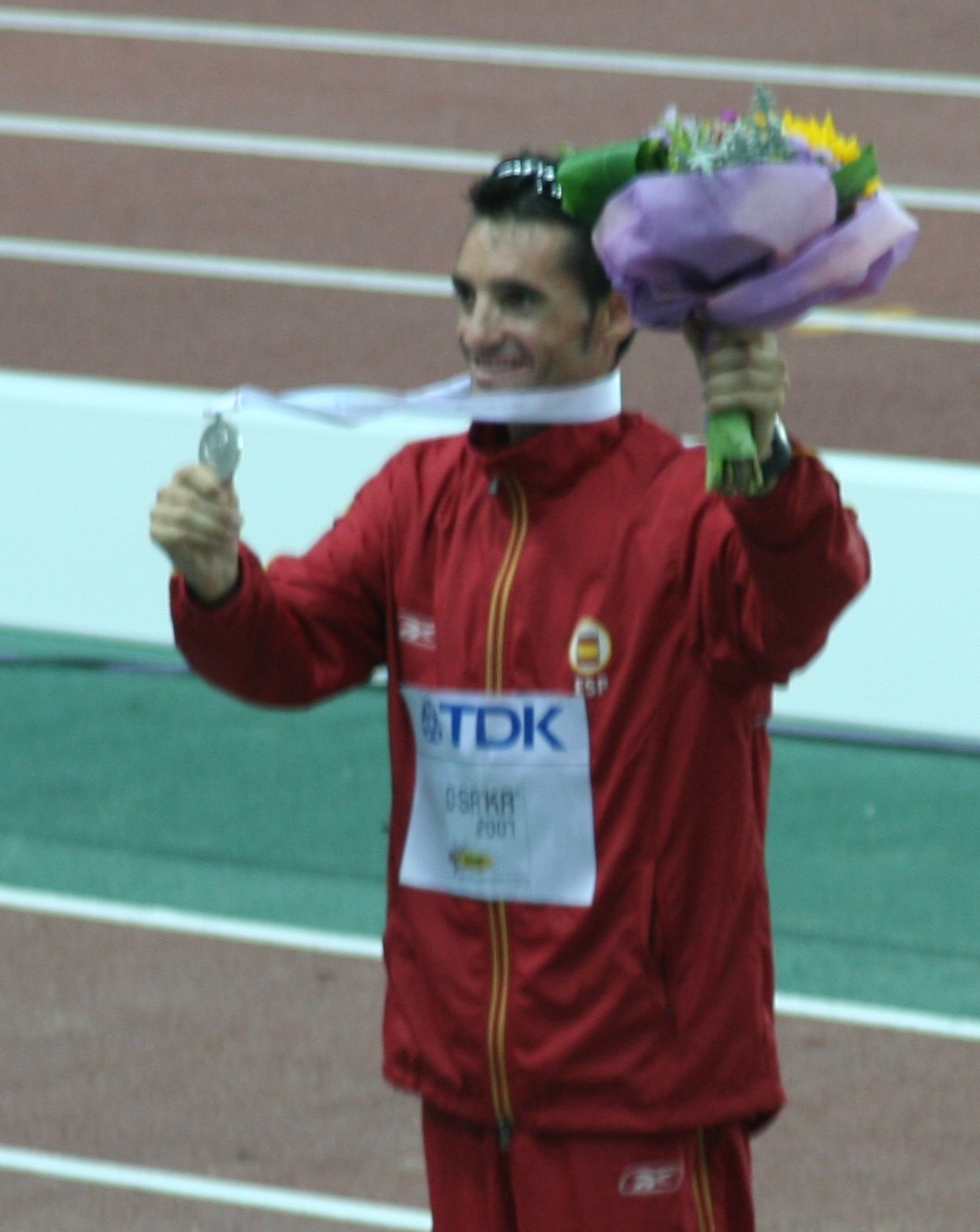
Paquillo Fernández won back-to-back races in 2005 to 2006.

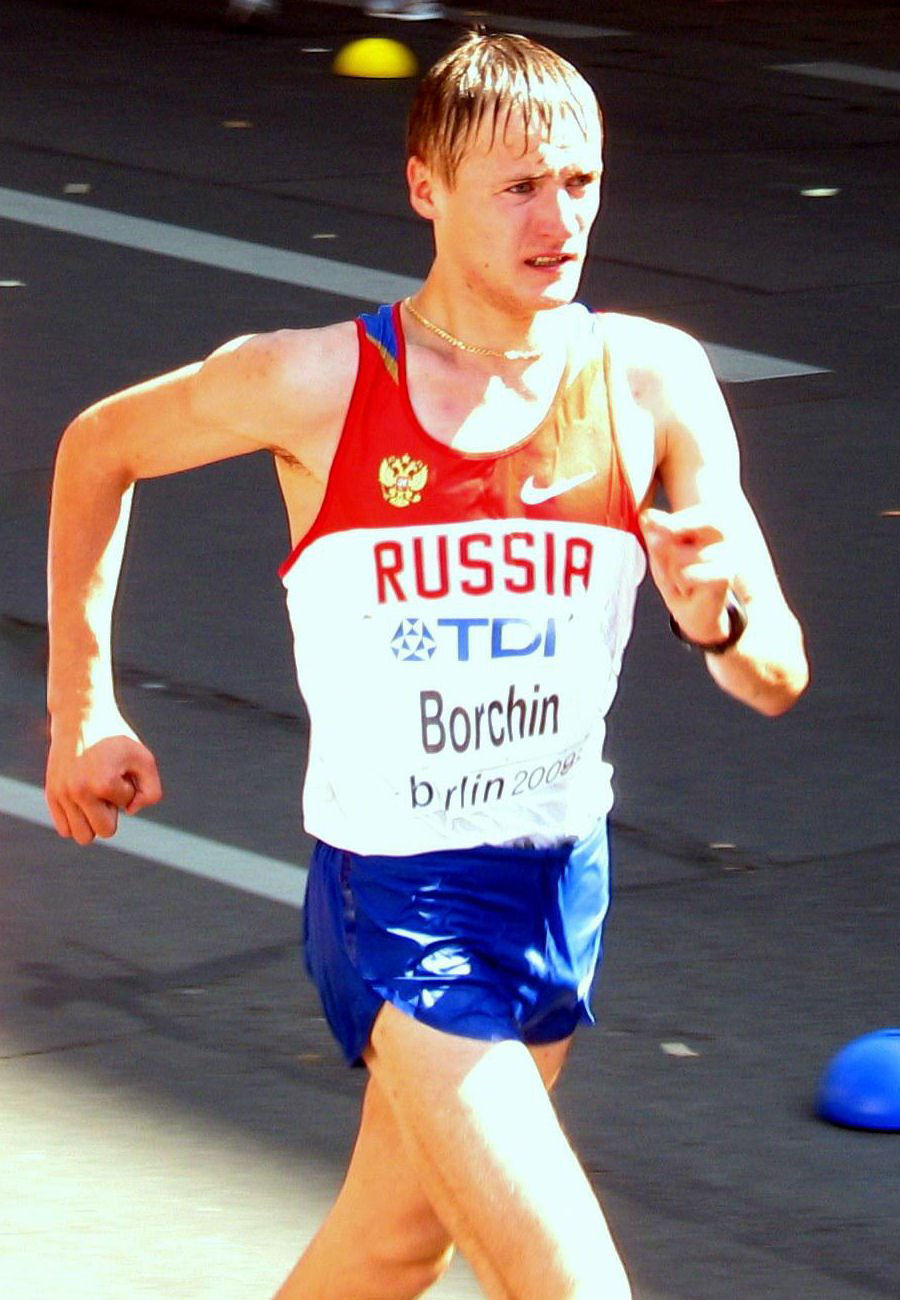
Valeriy Borchin set the men's course record in 2011.

Key: Course record Portuguese championship race

Edition	Year	Men's winner	Time (h:m:s)	Women's winner	Time (h:m:s)
1st	1991	José Urbano (POR)	43:00	Sari Essayah (FIN)	22:00
—	1992	José Urbano (POR)	3:59:33	Isilda Gonçalves (POR)	47:22
2nd	1993	José Urbano (POR)	1:25:32	Susana Feitor (POR)	43:44
3rd	1994	Juan Ramilo (ESP)	1:25:13	Susana Feitor (POR)	44:24
4th	1995	José Urbano (POR)	1:27:19	Susana Feitor (POR)	46:43
5th	1996	Claus Jørgensen (DEN)	1:25:01	Susana Feitor (POR)	44:28
6th	1997	João Vieira (POR)	1:24:48	Susana Feitor (POR)	44:41
7th	1998	Aigars Fadejevs (LAT)	1:19:44	Susana Feitor (POR)	43:42
8th	1999	Ilya Markov (RUS)	1:20:37	Susana Feitor (POR)	1:35:06
9th	2000	Liu Yunfeng (CHN)	1:20:01	Liu Hongyu (CHN)	1:27:55
10th	2001	Aigars Fadejevs (LAT)	1:22:02	Susana Feitor (POR)	1:27:55
11th	2002	Aigars Fadejevs (LAT)	1:21:26	María Vasco (ESP)	43:57
12th	2003	Aigars Fadejevs (LAT)	1:21:18	Elisabetta Perrone (ITA)	1:30:35
13th	2004	Alessandro Gandellini (ITA)	1:22:49	Elisa Rigaudo (ITA)	1:29:58
14th	2005	Paquillo Fernández (ESP)	1:19:02	Ryta Turava (BLR)	1:27:19
15th	2006	Paquillo Fernández (ESP)	1:20:36	Melanie Seeger (GER)	1:29:15
16th	2007	Ivano Brugnetti (ITA)	1:20:21	Ryta Turava (BLR)	1:28:01
17th	2008	Erik Tysse (NOR)	1:19:51	Kjersti Plätzer (NOR)	1:29:29
18th	2009	Wang Hao (CHN)	1:19:27	Kjersti Plätzer (NOR)	1:30:35
19th	2010	Erik Tysse (NOR)	1:20:08	Vera Santos (POR)	1:29:16
20th	2011	Valeriy Borchin (RUS)	1:18:55	Olga Kaniskina (RUS)	1:28:35
21st	2012	Matej Tóth (SVK)	1:20:25	Beatriz Pascual (ESP)	1:31:03
22nd	2013	João Vieira (POR)	1:21:08	Elena Lashmanova (RUS)	1:28:19
23rd	2014	Caio Bonfim (BRA)	1:23:15	Vera Santos (POR)	1:31:14
24th	2015	Éider Arévalo (COL)	1:20:41	Liu Hong (CHN)	1:27:22
25th	2016	Álvaro Martín (ESP)	1:21:03	Qieyang Shijie (CHN)	1:27:52
26th	2017	Éider Arévalo (COL)	1:20:40	Kimberly García (PER)	1:31:00
27th	2018	Diego García (ESP)	1:21:15	Qieyang Shijie (CHN)	1:28:04
28th	2019	Éider Arévalo (COL)	1:21:15	Qieyang Shijie (CHN)	1:29:00
–	2020	Did not held due to COVID-19 pandemic in Portugal			
–	2021	Did not held due to COVID-19 pandemic in Portugal			
29th	2022	Brian Pintado (ECU)	1:21:54	Kimberly García (PER)	1:32:42
30th	2023	Brian Pintado (ECU)	1:19:05	Yang Jiayu (CHN)	1:29:10
31st	2024	Brian Pintado (ECU)	1:19:57	Kimberly García (PER)	1:30:35
