= 1998 World Junior Championships in Athletics – Women's 5000 metres walk =

The women's 5000 metres walk event at the 1998 World Junior Championships in Athletics was held in Annecy, France, at Parc des Sports on 1 August.

== Medalists ==
Gold	Sabine Zimmer; Germany
Silver	Jolanta Dukure; Latvia
Bronze	Xue Ailing; China

== Results ==
=== Final ===
1 August

Rank	Name	Nationality	Time	Notes
1st place, gold medalist(s)	Sabine Zimmer	Germany	21:14.39	
2nd place, silver medalist(s)	Jolanta Dukure	Latvia	21:17.89	
3rd place, bronze medalist(s)	Xue Ailing	China	21:28.57	
4	Lyudmila Dedekina	Russia	21:52.91	
5	Daniela Cîrlan	Romania	22:04.60	
6	Rita Turova	Belarus	22:06.06	
7	Elisa Rigaudo	Italy	22:07.21	
8	Larisa Safronova	Russia	22:12.75	
9	Shi Na	China	22:28.15	
10	Michelle French	Australia	22:37.96	
11	Aura Morales	Mexico	22:53.55	
12	Mária Gáliková	Slovakia	22:53.70	
13	Zuzana Blazeková	Slovakia	22:53.84	
14	Cinzia Artino	Italy	22:57.32	
15	Renee McAskill	Australia	23:14.82	
16	Anne Haaland Simonsen	Norway	23:17.68	
17	Edina Füsti	Hungary	23:32.04	
18	Vianey Pedraza	Mexico	23:32.81	
19	Lyubov Zhivoglyadova	Kazakhstan	23:36.40	
20	Lisa Kutzing	United States	23:38.48	
21	Vanessa Espinosa	Spain	23:40.34	
22	Luisa Paltin	Ecuador	23:49.98	
23	Mónica Carrión	Ecuador	23:53.86	
24	Inês Henriques	Portugal	23:54.51	
25	Beatrice Klabuhn	Germany	23:57.11	
26	Ayako Mori	Japan	24:01.19	
27	Melissa Rodriguez	France	24:16.74	
28	Ayumi Miyashita	Japan	24:27.98	
29	Vera Santos	Portugal	24:33.63	
30	Magdalena Jacobson	Sweden	24:38.20	
31	Dímitra Koukuli	Greece	25:00.72	
32	Carma Watson	New Zealand	25:19.61	
33	Zeneida Obando	Nicaragua	26:25.59	
	Elin Cecilie Løftesnes	Norway	DQ	
	Virginie Janvier	France	DNF	

== Participation ==
According to an unofficial count, 35 athletes from 23 countries participated in the event.

- Australia (2)
- Belarus (1)
- China (2)
- Ecuador (2)
- France (2)
- Germany (2)
- Greece (1)
- Hungary (1)
- Italy (2)
- Japan (2)
- Kazakhstan (1)
- Latvia (1)
- Mexico (2)
- New Zealand (1)
- Nicaragua (1)
- Norway (2)
- Portugal (2)
- Romania (1)
- Russia (2)
- Slovakia (2)
- Spain (1)
- Sweden (1)
- United States (1)
