= Tatyana Kalmykova =

Russian race walker

Personal information
- Full name: Tatyana Vasilyevna Kalmykova
- Nationality: Russia
- Born: 10 January 1990 (age 36)
- Height: 1.66 m (5 ft 5 1/2 in)
- Weight: 48 kg (106 lb)

Sport
- Sport: Women's athletics
- Event: Race walking
Medal record
Representing Russia
IAAF World Youth Championships
Gold medal – first place	2005 Marrakesh	5000 m walk
Gold medal – first place	2007 Ostrava	5000 m walk
IAAF World Race Walking Cup
Gold medal – first place	2008 Cheboksary	Junior 10 km walk

Tatyana Vasilyevna Kalmykova (Russian: Татьяна Васильевна Калмыкова; born 10 January 1990) is a Russian race walker. She represented Russia at the 2008 Summer Olympics in Beijing, and competed in the women's 20 km race walk, along with her teammates Tatyana Sibileva and Olga Kaniskina, who eventually won the gold medal for this event. In spite of tumultuous rains, Kalmykova did not hinder her chances of racing around a 20 km walk; however, she received a final warning (a total of three red cards) for not following the proper form during the 14 km lap, and was subsequently disqualified.

Kalmykova had won gold medal for the 10 km race walk (junior division) at the 2008 IAAF World Race Walking Cup in Cheboksary. She also defended two titles and set world junior records for the 5 km track walk at the IAAF World Youth Championships in 2005 and in 2007.
