= 2006 European Athletics Championships – Women's 20 kilometres walk =

Women's 20 kilometres walk at the European Athletics Championships

The Women's 20 km walk event at the 2006 European Championships was held on August 9, 2006 in Gothenburg, Sweden, with the start at 17:15h.

== Medalists ==
Gold	Ryta Turava; Belarus (BLR)
Silver	Olga Kaniskina; Russia (RUS)
Bronze	Elisa Rigaudo; Italy (ITA)

== Abbreviations ==
- All times shown are in hours:minutes:seconds

DNS	did not start
NM	no mark
WR	world record
WL	world leading
AR	area record
NR	national record
Personal Best	personal best
Season Best	season best

== Records ==
Standing records prior to the 2006 European Athletics Championships
World Record	Olimpiada Ivanova (RUS)	1:24.50	March 4, 2001	Adler, Russia
Event Record	Olimpiada Ivanova (RUS)	1:26.42	August 7, 2002	Munich, Germany

== Results ==
Rank	Athlete	Time	Note
1st place, gold medalist(s)	Ryta Turava (BLR)	1:27:08	
2nd place, silver medalist(s)	Olga Kaniskina (RUS)	1:28:35	
3rd place, bronze medalist(s)	Elisa Rigaudo (ITA)	1:28:37	Season Best
4	Kjersti Plätzer (NOR)	1:28:45	
5	Claudia Stef (ROM)	1:29:27	Season Best
6	Sabine Zimmer (GER)	1:29:56	
7	Sylwia Korzeniowska (POL)	1:30:31	NR
8	Vera Santos (POR)	1:30:41	Personal Best
9	Jolanta Dukure (LAT)	1:31:02	NR
10	Melanie Seeger (GER)	1:31:29	
11	Ana Maria Groza (ROM)	1:31:35	
12	Inês Henriques (POR)	1:31:58	
13	Zuzana Malíková (SVK)	1:32:14	NR
14	Susana Feitor (POR)	1:32:19	
15	María Vasco (ESP)	1:32:50	Season Best
16	Gisella Orsini (ITA)	1:33:10	Season Best
17	Galina Kolpakova (RUS)	1:33:39	
18	Rossella Giordano (ITA)	1:33:56	
19	María José Poves (ESP)	1:35:03	
20	Beatriz Pascual (ESP)	1:36:03	
21	Sonata Milušauskaitė (LTU)	1:36:20	
22	Monica Svensson (SWE)	1:38:25	
DID NOT FINISH (DNF)
—	Kristina Saltanovič (LTU)	DNF	
DISQUALIFIED (DSQ)
—	Elena Ginko (BLR)	DSQ	

== See also ==
- 2006 Race Walking Year Ranking
