= Athletics at the 2014 Asian Games – Men's 20 kilometres walk =

Men's 20 kilometres walk at the 2014 Asian Games
- Venue: Incheon Asiad Main Stadium
- Dates: 28 September 2014
- Competitors: 9 from 5 nations

Medalists
gold medal	Wang Zhen	China
silver medal	Yusuke Suzuki	Japan
bronze medal	Kim Hyun-sub	South Korea

The men's 20 kilometres walk event at the 2014 Asian Games was held on the streets of Incheon, South Korea on 28 September.

== Schedule ==
All times are Korea Standard Time (UTC+09:00)

Date	Time	Event
Sunday, 28 September 2014	08:00	Final

== Records ==
Prior to this competition, the existing world, Asian and Games records were as follows.

World Record	Vladimir Kanaykin (RUS)	1:17:16	Saransk, Russia	29 September 2007
Asian Record	Wang Zhen (CHN)	1:17:36	Taicang, China	30 March 2012
Games Record	Yu Guohui (CHN)	1:20:25	Bangkok, Thailand	13 December 1998

== Results ==
Legend

- DSQ — Disqualified

Rank	Athlete	Time	Notes
1st place, gold medalist(s)	Wang Zhen (CHN)	1:19:45	GR
2nd place, silver medalist(s)	Yusuke Suzuki (JPN)	1:20:44	
3rd place, bronze medalist(s)	Kim Hyun-sub (KOR)	1:21:37	
4	Cai Zelin (CHN)	1:22:56	
5	K. T. Irfan (IND)	1:23:18	
6	Georgiy Sheiko (KAZ)	1:23:45	
7	Eiki Takahashi (JPN)	1:24:04	
—	Choe Byeong-kwang (KOR)	DSQ	
—	Ganapathi Krishnan (IND)	DSQ	
