= Nischan Daimer =

German race walker

Nischan Daimer (born Nischan Tsamonikyan on 19 July 1967 in Leningrad, Soviet Union) is a retired male race walker who competed internationally for Germany. He was affiliated with OSC Münchener Sportclub during his career. He represented Germany at the 1996 Olympic Games (finishing 15th over 20 km) and also competed at the 1995 World Championships in Athletics, where he was twelfth place in the men's 20 km.

== Achievements ==
Year	Competition	Venue	Position	Event	Notes
Representing Germany
1995	World Race Walking Cup	Beijing, PR China	46th	20 km	1:27:14
1995	World Championships	Gothenburg, Sweden	12th	20 km	1:24:34
1996	Olympic Games	Atlanta, United States	15th	20 km	1:23:23
2000	European Race Walking Cup	Eisenhüttenstadt, Germany	21st	20 km	1:23:14
