= Athletics at the 2008 Summer Olympics – Women's 20 kilometres walk =

Women's 20 kilometres walk at the Games of the XXIX Olympiad
- Venue: Beijing National Stadium
- Dates: 21 August 2008
- Competitors: 48 from 30 nations
- Winning time: 1:26:31 OR

Medalists
1st place, gold medalist(s)		Olga Kaniskina	Russia
2nd place, silver medalist(s)		Kjersti Plätzer	Norway
3rd place, bronze medalist(s)		Elisa Rigaudo	Italy

The women's 20 km walk event at the 2008 Olympic Games took place on August 21 at the Beijing Olympic Stadium. The qualifying standards were 1:33.30 (A standard) and 1:38.00 (B standard).

== Records ==
Prior to this event, the existing world and Olympic records were as follows:

World record	Olimpiada Ivanova (RUS)	1:25:41	Helsinki, Finland	7 August 2005
Olympic record	Wang Liping (CHN)	1:29:05	Sydney, Australia	28 September 2000

== Schedule ==
All times are China standard time (UTC+8)

Date	Time	Round
Thursday, 21 August 2008	09:00	Final

== Results ==
Rank	Athlete	Country		Notes
1st place, gold medalist(s)	Olga Kaniskina	Russia	1:26:31	OR
2nd place, silver medalist(s)	Kjersti Plätzer	Norway	1:27:07	NR
3rd place, bronze medalist(s)	Elisa Rigaudo	Italy	1:27:12	PB
4	Liu Hong	China	1:27:17	PB
5	María Vasco	Spain	1:27:25	NR
6	Beatriz Pascual	Spain	1:27:44	PB
7	Olive Loughnane	Ireland	1:27:45	PB
8	Ana Cabecinha	Portugal	1:27:46	NR
9	Vera Santos	Portugal	1:28:14	PB
10	Ryta Turava	Belarus	1:28:26	SB
11	Tatyana Sibileva	Russia	1:28:28	
12	Shi Na	China	1:29:08	SB
13	Mayumi Kawasaki	Japan	1:29:43	
14	Sabine Zimmer	Germany	1:30:19	
15	Sonata Milušauskaité	Lithuania	1:30:26	NR
16	Vira Zozulya	Ukraine	1:30:31	
17	María José Poves	Spain	1:30:52	
18	Kristina Saltanovic	Lithuania	1:31:03	SB
19	Jane Saville	Australia	1:31:17	
20	Sylwia Korzeniowska	Poland	1:31:19	
21	Johanna Jackson	Great Britain	1:31:33	NR
22	Melanie Seeger	Germany	1:31:56	
23	Ana Maria Groza	Romania	1:32:16	
24	Evaggelía Xinoú	Greece	1:32:19	PB
25	Sachiko Konishi	Japan	1:32:21	
26	Zuzana Schindlerová	Czech Republic	1:32:57	PB
27	Claire Woods	Australia	1:33:02	=PB
28	Kim Mi-Jung	South Korea	1:33:55	
29	Svetlana Tolstaya	Kazakhstan	1:34:03	SB
30	Joanne Dow	United States	1:34:15	SB
31	Zuzana Malíková	Slovakia	1:34:33	SB
32	Sniazhana Yurchanka	Belarus	1:35:33	
33	Nadiya Prokopuk	Ukraine	1:35:50	
34	Sandra Zapata	Colombia	1:36:18	
35	Johana Ordóñez	Ecuador	1:36:26	
36	Tania Regina Spindler	Brazil	1:36:46	
37	Verónica Colindres	El Salvador	1:36:52	SB
38	Edina Füsti	Hungary	1:37:03	
39	Kellie Wapshott	Australia	1:37:59	
40	Déspina Zapounídou	Greece	1:39:11	
41	Jolanta Dukure	Latvia	1:41:03	
42	Evelyn Núñez	Guatemala	1:44:13	
	Tatyana Kalmykova	Russia	DQ	
	Yang Mingxia	China	DQ	
	Elena Ginko	Belarus	DQ	
	Athanasía Tsoumeléka	Greece	~~1:27:54~~	DSQ
	Yuan Yufang	Malaysia	DNF	
	Susana Feitor	Portugal	DNF	

OR - Olympic Record, NR - National Record, PB - Personal Best (= - Equaled), SB - Season Best

=== Intermediates ===
Intermediate	Athlete	Country	Mark
4 km	1. Olga Kaniskina	Russia	17:00
4 km	2. María Vasco	Spain	+0:27
4 km	3. Vera Santos	Portugal	s.t.
4 km	4. Ryta Turava	Belarus	s.t.
4 km	5. Elisa Rigaudo	Italy	s.t.
8 km	1. Olga Kaniskina	Russia	34:09
8 km	2. Kjersti Plätzer	Norway	+0:41
8 km	3. Ryta Turava	Belarus	s.t.
8 km	4. Tatyana Kalmykova	Russia	+0:42
8 km	5. Beatriz Pascual	Spain	s.t.
12 km	1. Olga Kaniskina	Russia	51:19
12 km	2. Ryta Turava	Belarus	+0:41
12 km	3. Kjersti Plätzer	Norway	+0:49
12 km	4. María Vasco	Spain	s.t.
12 km	5. Tatyana Kalmykova	Russia	+0:56
16 km	1. Olga Kaniskina	Russia	1:08:31
16 km	2. Ryta Turava	Belarus	+0:59
16 km	3. Kjersti Plätzer	Norway	+1:09
16 km	4. María Vasco	Spain	s.t.
16 km	5. Hong Liu	China	+1:20

s.t. - same time.
