= Ana Maria Groza =

Romanian race walker

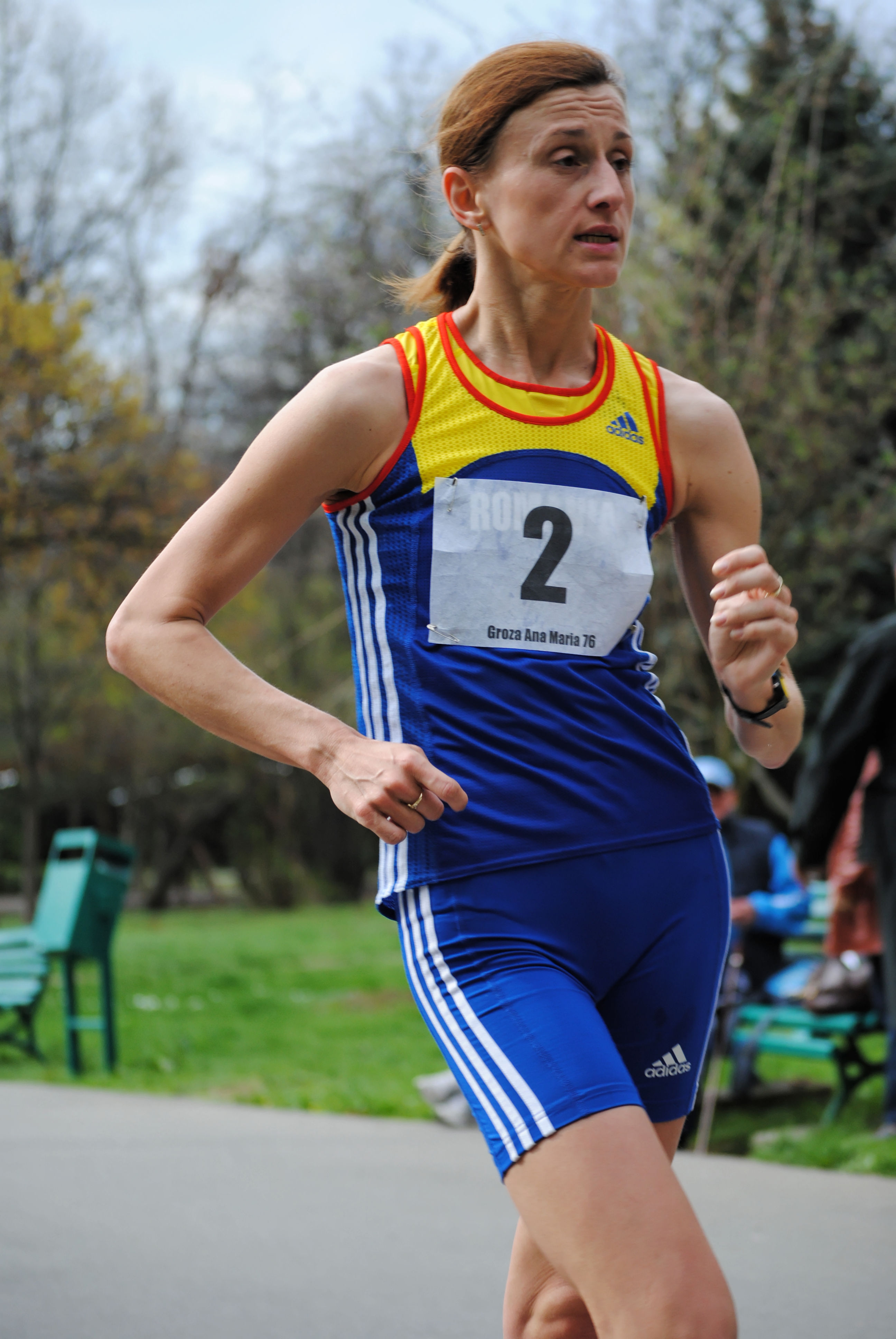
Groza during Balkan Race Walking Championship, Bucharest, 2011

Ana Maria Groza (born 1 June 1976 in Cluj-Napoca) is a Romanian race walker.

== Achievements ==
Year	Competition	Venue	Position	Event	Notes
Representing Romania
1999	World Race Walking Cup	Mézidon-Canon, France	57th	20 km	1:39:05
2000	European Race Walking Cup	Eisenhüttenstadt, Germany	10th	20 km	1:31:08
2000	European Race Walking Cup	Eisenhüttenstadt, Germany	2nd	Team - 20 km	29 pts
2000	Olympic Games	Sydney, Australia	13th	20 km	1:33:38
2002	World Race Walking Cup	Turin, Italy	34th	20 km	1:36:43
2004	World Race Walking Cup	Naumburg, Germany	55th	20 km	1:37:15
2004	Olympic Games	Athens, Greece	29th	20 km	1:34:56
2005	World Championships	Helsinki, Finland	14th	20 km	1:31:48
2006	World Race Walking Cup	A Coruña, Spain	20th	20 km	1:32:29
2006	European Championships	Gothenburg, Sweden	11th	20 km	1:31:35
2008	World Race Walking Cup	Cheboksary, Russia	18th	20 km	1:31:37
2008	Olympic Games	Beijing, China	23rd	20 km	1:32:16
2009	European Race Walking Cup	Metz, France	—	20 km	DQ
2009	World Championships	Berlin, Germany	16th	20 km	1:35:19
2011	European Race Walking Cup	Olhão, Portugal	24th	20 km	1:37:18
2012	World Race Walking Cup	Saransk, Russia	50th	20 km	1:39:16
