= Beatriz Pascual =

Spanish race walker (born 1982)

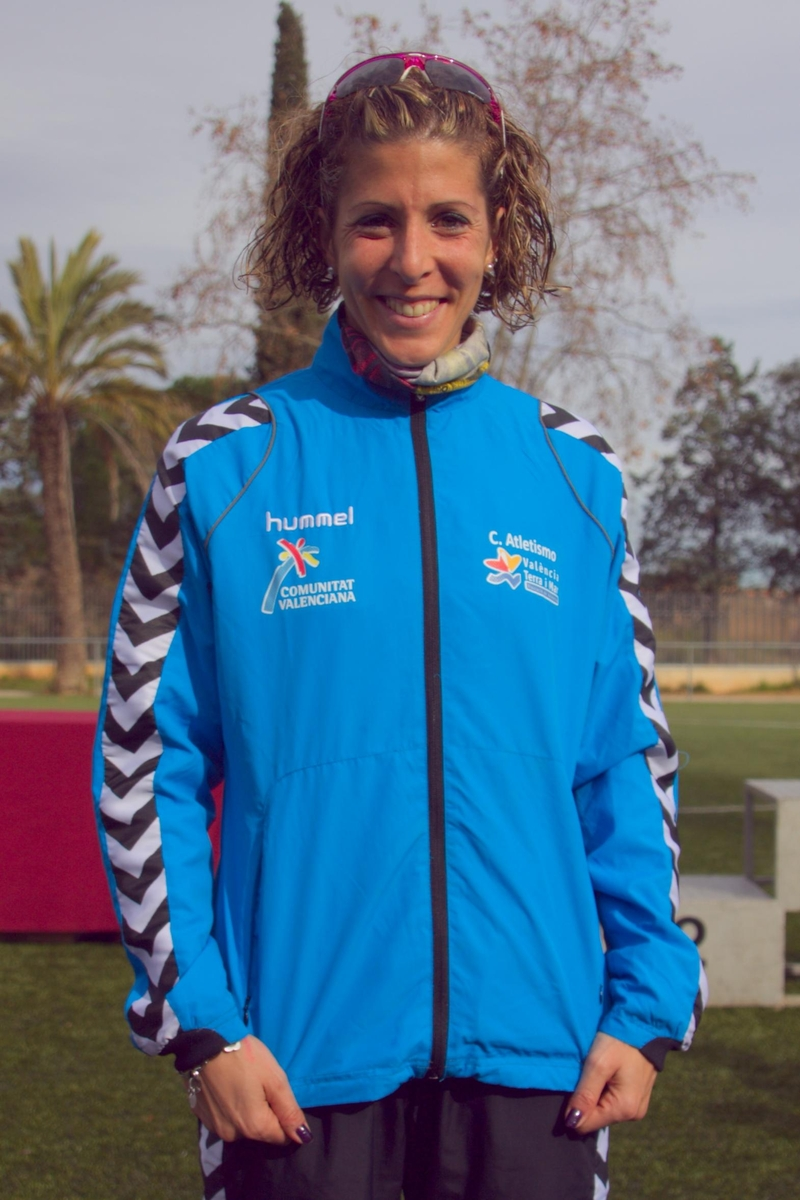
- Pascual in 2014

Personal information
- Full name: Beatriz Pascual Rodríguez
- Born: 9 May 1982 (age 44) Viladecans, Spain
- Height: 1.63 m (5 ft 4 in)
- Weight: 52 kg (115 lb)

Sport
- Country: Spain
- Sport: Athletics
- Event: 20 km race walk
Medal record
European Cup
| Silver medal – second place | 2009 Metz | 20 km team |

Beatriz Pascual Rodríguez (born 9 May 1982) is a Spanish race walker. She holds the women's national record for Spain in the 5000 m track walk (20:53.97). She was also Spain's national champion in the 20 km walk event in 2006 and 2008. She represented Spain at the Olympics in 2008 and finished sixth in the women's 20 km walk. She has also competed at the World Championships in Athletics, taking 13th in 2007 and 6th in 2009. She won the bronze medal at the 2005 Mediterranean Games.

Pascual suffered an injury in November 2010 and returned to training in March 2010. She finished in eleventh at the 2010 IAAF World Race Walking Cup, but she went on to win at a meeting on home soil at the Gran Premio Cantones de La Coruña in June 2010. She was ninth in the 20 km walk at the 2011 World Championships in Athletics. She began 2012 with a win at the Rio Maior GP. At the 2012 Summer Olympics, she finished in 8th place.

== Achievements ==
| Year | Competition | Venue | Position | Event | Notes |
Representing Spain
| 1999 | World Youth Championships | Bydgoszcz, Poland | 11th | 5000 m | 24:32.10 |
| 2000 | European Race Walking Cup (U20) | Eisenhüttenstadt, Germany | 6th | 10 km | 46:44 |
| 2000 | World Junior Championships | Santiago, Chile | 6th | 10,000 m | 47:14.79 |
| 2002 | European Championships | Munich, Germany | 12th | 20 km | 1:32:38 |
| 2002 | World Race Walking Cup | Turin, Italy | 19th | 20 km | 1:34:28 |
| 2003 | European U23 Championships | Bydgoszcz, Poland | 4th | 20 km | 1:37:28 |
| 2004 | World Race Walking Cup | Naumburg, Germany | 18th | 20 km | 1:30:22 |
| 2005 | Mediterranean Games | Almería, Spain | 3rd | 20 km | 1:36:27 |
| 2006 | European Championships | Gothenburg, Sweden | 20th | 20 km | 1:36:03 |
| 2007 | World Championships | Osaka, Japan | 13th | 20 km | 1:35:13 |
| 2008 | World Race Walking Cup | Cheboksary, Russia | 25th | 20 km | 1:33:55 |
| 2008 | Olympic Games | Beijing, China | 6th | 20 km | 1:27:44 |
| 2009 | European Race Walking Cup | Metz, France | 6th | 20 km | 1:35:28 |
| 2009 | European Race Walking Cup | Metz, France | 2nd | Team – 20 km | 18 pts |
| 2009 | World Championships | Berlin, Germany | 6th | 20 km | 1:30:40 |
| 2010 | World Race Walking Cup | Chihuahua, Mexico | 11th | 20 km | 1:36:08 |
| 2010 | European Championships | Barcelona, Spain | 5th | 20 km | 1:29:52 |
| 2011 | World Championships | Daegu, South Korea | 9th | 20 km | 1:31:46 |
| 2012 | World Race Walking Cup | Saransk, Russia | 5th | 20 km | 1:30:46 |
| 2012 | Olympic Games | London, United Kingdom | 8th | 20 km | 1:27:56 |
| 2013 | European Race Walking Cup | Dudince, Slovakia | 9th | 20 km | 1:32:53 |
| 2013 | European Race Walking Cup | Dudince, Slovakia | 3rd | Team – 20 km | 39 pts |
| 2013 | World Championships | Moscow, Russia | 6th | 20 km | 1:29:00 |
| 2014 | World Race Walking Cup | Taicang, China | 21st | 20 km | 1:29:22 |
| 2014 | European Championships | Zurich, Switzerland | 8th | 20 km | 1:29:02 |
