= Evangelia Xinou =

Greek race walker

Personal information
- Nationality: Greece
- Born: 22 November 1981 (age 44) Athens, Greece
- Height: 1.68 m (5 ft 6 in)
- Weight: 57 kg (126 lb)

Sport
- Sport: Athletics
- Event: Race walking
- Club: Olympiakos (GRE)

Achievements and titles
- Personal best(s): 10 km walk: 44:33 (2008); 20 km walk: 1:32:19 (2008); 50 km walk: 4:28:13 (2004)

Evangelia Xinou (Greek: Ευαγγελία Ξυνού; born November 22, 1981, in Athens) is a female Greek race walker. She is a four-time national champion (2005–2008) for the 20 km race walk .

Xinou represented Greece at the 2008 Summer Olympics in Beijing, where she competed for the women's 20 km race walk, along with her compatriots Despina Zapounidou and Athanasia Tsoumeleka, who later disqualified from the event because of doping charges. Despite the tumultuous weather, she finished the race in twenty-fifth place by three seconds behind Romania's Ana Maria Groza, with a personal best time of 1:32:19.
