= Vera Santos =

Portuguese race walker

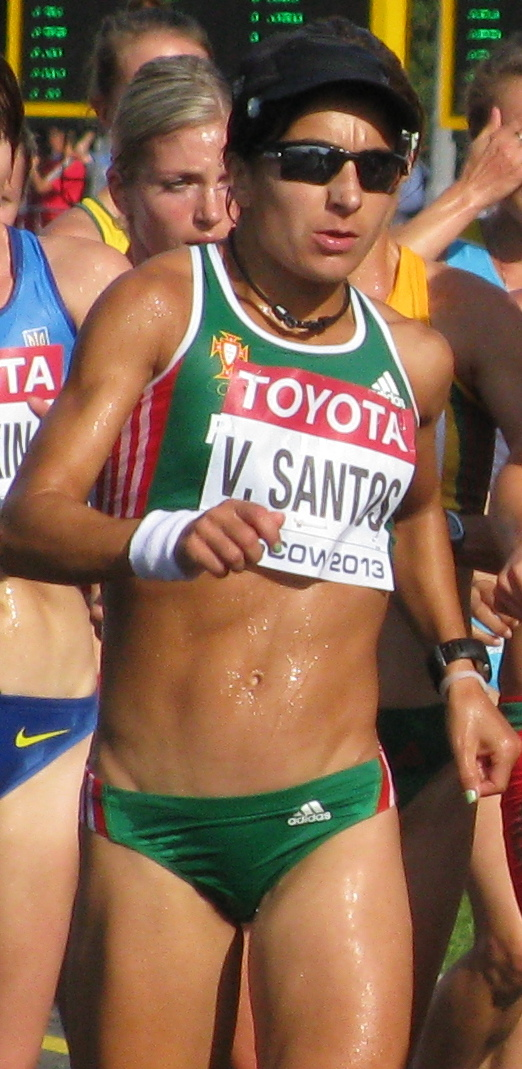
- Vera Santos in 2013

Personal information
- Born: 3 December 1981 (age 43) Santarém, Portugal
- Height: 1.64 m (5 ft 4 1/2 in)
- Weight: 57 kg (126 lb)

Sport
- Country: Portugal
- Sport: Athletics
- Event: 20km Race Walk

Vera Lúcia Montez dos Santos (born 3 December 1981) is a Portuguese race walker.

== Career ==
She began racing at the senior international level in 2002, taking part in the 2002 European Athletics Championships. Her first major medal was a silver at the 2003 European Athletics U23 Championships and she went on to compete at that year's World Championships in Athletics. Santos finished 15th at the 2005 World Championships but managed a silver at the 2005 Summer Universiade. She won the bronze at the 2008 IAAF World Race Walking Cup and then went on to finish ninth in a then personal best time at the 2008 Beijing Olympics later that year. She put in the highest-ranking performance at the 2009 World Championships, taking fifth place.

Santos won her first national racewalking title in 2005 and became a two-time national champion in 2010 with a win at the Meeting de Marcha Atlética da Cidade de Olhao. She took another victory on home turf soon after, winning the Grande Premio Internacional en Marcha Atletica in Rio Maior. She led the race throughout, holding off China's Li Yanfei, and after the win she began altitude training to prepare for the upcoming World Race Walking Cup. She took her third circuit win of the year at the Coppa Città di Sesto San Giovanni. She competed at the 2012 Summer Olympics.

In 2014, she set a new personal best of 1:28:02 at the World Race Walking Cup in Taicang, finishing in 11th place.

== Achievements ==
Year	Competition	Venue	Position	Event	Notes
Representing Portugal
1998	World Junior Championships	Annecy, France	29th	5000 m	24:33.63
2000	European Race Walking Cup (U20)	Eisenhüttenstadt, Germany	8th	10 km	47:22
2000	World Junior Championships	Santiago, Chile	5th	10,000 m	47:11.18
2001	European U23 Championships	Amsterdam, Netherlands	12th	20 km	1:35:51
2002	European Championships	Munich, Germany	17th	20 km	1:37:19
2002	World Race Walking Cup	Turin, Italy	36th	20 km	1:37:18
2003	European U23 Championships	Bydgoszcz, Poland	2nd	20 km	1:35:18
2003	World Championships	Paris, France	15th	20 km	1:32:43
2004	World Race Walking Cup	Naumburg, Germany	36th	20 km	1:37:39
2005	European Race Walking Cup	Miskolc, Hungary	7th	20 km	1:31:58
2005	European Race Walking Cup	Miskolc, Hungary	1st	Team - 20 km	25 pts
2005	World Championships	Helsinki, Finland	15th	20 km	1:32:17
2005	Universiade	İzmir, Turkey	2nd	20 km	1:33:54
2006	World Race Walking Cup	A Coruña, Spain	27th	20 km	1:33:54
2006	European Championships	Gothenburg, Sweden	8th	20 km	1:30:41
2007	World Championships	Osaka, Japan	11th	20 km	1:34:28
2008	World Race Walking Cup	Cheboksary, Russia	3rd	20 km	1:28:17
2008	Olympic Games	Beijing, China	9th	20 km	1:28:14
2009	European Race Walking Cup	Metz, France	—	20 km	DQ
2009	World Championships	Berlin, Germany	5th	20 km	1:30:35
2010	World Race Walking Cup	Chihuahua, Mexico	2nd	20 km	1:32:06
2010	European Championships	Barcelona, Spain	6th	20 km	1:30:52
2011	European Race Walking Cup	Olhão, Portugal	—	20 km	DNF
2012	World Race Walking Cup	Saransk, Russia	17th	20 km	1:33:08
2012	Olympic Games	London, United Kingdom	49th	20 km	1:35:51
2013	European Race Walking Cup	Dudince, Slovakia	10th	20 km	1:32:54
2013	European Race Walking Cup	Dudince, Slovakia	2nd	Team - 20 km	23 pts
2013	World Championships	Moscow, Russia	17th	20 km	1:31:36
2014	World Race Walking Cup	Taicang, China	11th	20 km	1:28:02
2015	European Race Walking Cup	Murcia, Spain	13th	20 km	1:30:30
2015	European Race Walking Cup	Murcia, Spain	3rd	Team - 20 km	38 pts
2015	World Championships	Beijing, China	21st	20 km	1:34:01
