= Sniazhana Yurchanka =

Belarusian race walker

Personal information
- Full name: Sniazhana Ulazimirauna Yurchanka
- Nationality: Belarus
- Born: 1 August 1984 (age 41) Gomel, Byelorussian SSR, Soviet Union
- Height: 1.60 m (5 ft 3 in)
- Weight: 48 kg (106 lb)

Sport
- Sport: Athletics
- Event: Race walking

Achievements and titles
- Personal bests: 10 km walk: 46:23 (2005); 20 km walk: 1:30:33 (2006)

Sniazhana Ulazimirauna Yurchanka (Belarusian: Сняжана Уладзіміраўна Юрчанка; born 1 August 1984) is a female Belarusian race walker. Yurchanka represented Belarus at the 2008 Summer Olympics in Beijing, where she competed for the women's 20 km race walk, along with her compatriots Elena Ginko and Ryta Turava. Despite the tumultuous weather, Yurchanka finished the race in thirty-third place, with a time of 1:35:33.
