= Edina Füsti =

Hungarian race walker

Personal information
- Nationality: Hungary
- Born: 24 June 1982 (age 44) Ózd, Hungary
- Height: 1.64 m (5 ft 4 1/2 in)
- Weight: 50 kg (110 lb)

Sport
- Sport: Athletics
- Event: Race walking
- Club: Tatabányai SC

Achievements and titles
- Personal bests: 10 km walk: 47:25 (2008); 20 km walk: 1:34:07 (2012)

Edina Füsti (born 24 June 1982 in Ózd) is a female Hungarian race walker. She is a six-time national champion (2002–2007) for the 20 km race walk. Fusti made her official debut for the 2004 Summer Olympics in Athens, where she placed forty-fourth in the women's 20 km race walk, with a time of 1:39:45.

At the 2008 Summer Olympics in Beijing, Fusti competed for the second time in the 20 km race walk. Despite the tumultuous weather, she was able to finish and complete the race in thirty-ninth place by nearly eleven seconds behind El Salvador's Veronica Colindres, with her fastest possible time of 1:37:03.

Fusti is also a member of Tatabányai SC, being coached and trained by Antal Kiss.
