= Elisa Rigaudo =

Italian race walker (born 1980)

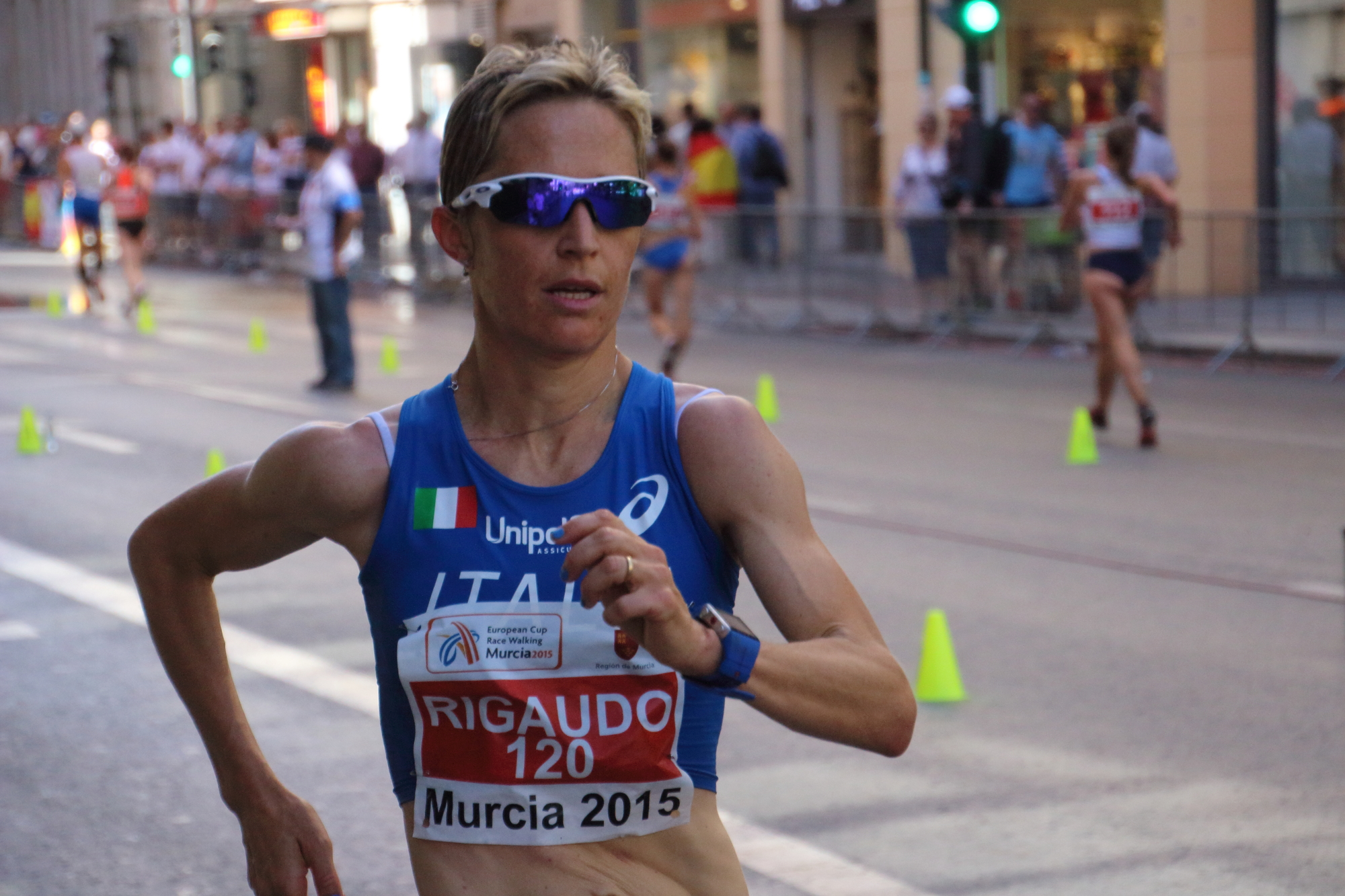

Personal information
- Born: 17 June 1980 (age 46) Cuneo, Italy
- Height: 1.68 m (5 ft 6 in)
- Weight: 55 kg (121 lb)

Sport
- Country: Italy
- Sport: Athletics
- Event: 20 km walk
- Club: G.S. Fiamme Gialle

Achievements and titles
- Personal best: 20 km: 1:27:12 (2008)
Medal record
| Event | 1st | 2nd | 3rd |
|---|---|---|---|
| Olympic Games | 0 | 0 | 1 |
| World Championships | 0 | 1 | 1 |
| European Championships | 0 | 0 | 1 |
| Mediterranean Games | 1 | 0 | 0 |
| World Race Walking Team C'ships | 0 | 1 | 0 |
| European Race Walking Team C'ships | 1 | 2 | 2 |
| European U23 Championships | 1 | 0 | 0 |
| Total | 3 | 4 | 5 |
Olympic Games
| Bronze medal – third place | 2008 Beijing | 20 km walk |
World Championships
| Silver medal – second place | 2011 Daegu | 20 km walk |
| Bronze medal – third place | 2013 Moscow | 20 km walk |
European Championships
| Bronze medal – third place | 2006 Gothenburg | 20 km walk |

Elisa Rigaudo (born 17 June 1980) is an Italian race walker from Cuneo.

She won eight medals, seven of these at senior level, at the International athletics competitions.

== Biography ==
She is affiliated with the Fiamme Gialle Castelporziano sports club. Rigaudo represented her country at the Summer Olympics in 2004 and 2008. She was the bronze medallist over 20 km at the 2011 European Race Walking Cup and went on to place fourth at the 2011 World Championships in Athletics, which was later upgraded to silver medal after disqualifications. In 2002, she received a public warning for high levels of caffeine in her doping sample. She came third at the 2012 Memorial Mario Albisetti, finishing behind Russia's Tatyana Sibileva.

== Progression ==
20 km walk

| Year | Time | Venue | Date | World Rank |
|---|---|---|---|---|
| 2012 | 1:27:36 | (United Kingdom) London | 11 AUG | 11th |
| 2011 | 1:30:44 | (South Korea) Daegu | 31 AUG | 30th |
| 2010 | stops due to maternity | | | |
| 2009 | 1:29:04 | (Italy) Sesto San Giovanni | 1 MAY | 15th |
| 2008 | 1:27:12 | (China) Beijing | 21 AUG | 8th |
| 2007 | 1:29:15 | (United Kingdom) Royal Leamington Spa | 20 MAY | 13th |
| 2006 | 1:28:37 | (Sweden) Gothenburg | 9 AUG | 11th |
| 2005 | 1:29:26 | (Hungary) Miskolc | 21 MAY | 26th |
| 2004 | 1:27:49 | (Germany) Naumburg | 2 MAY | 9th |
| 2003 | 1:30:34 | (France) Paris | 24 AUG | 33rd |
| 2002 | 1:30:43 | (Republic of Ireland) Dublin | 15 JUN | 20th |
| 2001 | 1:29:54 | (Netherlands) Amsterdam | 15 JUL | 22nd |
| 2000 | 1:32:50 | (Italy) Taranto | 19 MAR | 70th |

== Achievements ==
| Year | Competition | Venue | Position | Event | Notes |
Representing Italy
| 1998 | World Junior Championships | Annecy, France | 7th | 5000m walk | 22:07.21 |
| 1999 | European Junior Championships | Riga, Latvia | 6th | 5000m walk | 22:17.68 |
| 2001 | European U23 Championships | Amsterdam, Netherlands | 1st | 20 km walk | 1:29:54 |
| 2001 | Universiade | Beijing, China | – | 10 km | DNF |
| 2002 | World Race Walking Cup | Turin, Italy | 16th | 20 km walk | 1:33:38 |
| 2002 | World Race Walking Cup | Turin, Italy | 2nd | Team - 20 km | 26 pts |
| 2003 | European Race Walking Cup | Cheboksary, Russia | 13th | 20 km | 1:31:18 |
| 2003 | European Race Walking Cup | Cheboksary, Russia | 1st | Team - 20 km | 27 pts |
| 2003 | World Championships | Paris, France | 10th | 20 km walk | 1:30:34 |
| 2004 | Olympic Games | Athens, Greece | 6th | 20 km walk | 1:29:57 |
| 2004 | World Race Walking Cup | Naumburg, Germany | 5th | 20 km walk | 1:27:49 |
| 2005 | European Race Walking Cup | Miskolc, Hungary | 3rd | 20 km walk | 1:29:26 |
| 2005 | European Race Walking Cup | Miskolc, Hungary | 2nd | Team - 20 km | 26 pts |
| 2005 | World Championships | Helsinki, Finland | 7th | 20 km walk | 1:29:52 |
| 2005 | Mediterranean Games | Almería, Spain | 1st | 20 km walk | 1:32:44 |
| 2006 | European Championships | Gothenburg, Sweden | 3rd | 20 km walk | 1:28:37 |
| 2006 | World Race Walking Cup | A Coruña, Spain | 10th | 20 km walk | 1:29:37 |
| 2007 | European Race Walking Cup | Royal Leamington Spa, United Kingdom | 4th | 20 km | 1:29:15 |
| 2007 | World Championships | Osaka, Japan | — | 20 km walk | DNF |
| 2008 | Olympic Games | Beijing, China | 3rd | 20 km walk | 1:27:12 |
| 2008 | World Race Walking Cup | Cheboksary, Russia | 20th | 20 km walk | 1:32:38 |
| 2009 | World Championships | Berlin, Germany | 9th | 20 km walk | 1:31:52 |
| 2011 | European Race Walking Cup | Olhão, Portugal | 3rd | 20 km walk | 1:30:55 |
| 2011 | World Championships | Daegu, South Korea | 2nd | 20 km walk | 1:30:44 |
| 2012 | World Race Walking Cup | Saransk, Russia | 7th | 20 km | 1:31:25 |
| 2012 | Olympic Games | London, United Kingdom | 7th | 20 km walk | 1:27:36 |
| 2013 | European Race Walking Cup | Dudince, Slovakia | — | 20 km | DNF |
| 2013 | World Championships | Moscow, Russia | 3rd | 20 km walk | 1:28.41 |
| 2015 | European Race Walking Cup | Murcia, Spain | 8th | 20 km | 1:28:01 |
| 2015 | European Race Walking Cup | Murcia, Spain | 2nd | Team - 20 km | 30 pts |
| 2015 | World Championships | Beijing, China | — | 20 km walk | DQ |
| 2016 | Olympic Games | Rio de Janeiro, Brazil | 11th | 20 km walk | 1:31:04 |

== National titles ==
Elisa Rigaudo has won 13 times the individual national championship.

- 2 wins in the 5000 m walk track (2004, 2007)
- 1 win in the 10 km walk (2013)
- 4 wins in the 20 km walk (2003, 2004, 2005, 2008)
- 6 wins in the 3000 metres walk indoor (2004, 2005, 2006, 2007, 2008, 2009)

== See also ==
- Italy at the European Race Walking Cup - Multiple medalists
- Italian all-time lists - 20 km walk
