= Kjersti Plätzer =

Norwegian race walker (born 1972)

Olympic medal record

Women's athletics

Olympic Games
Silver medal – second place	2000 Sydney	20 km walk
Silver medal – second place	2008 Beijing	20 km walk

Kjersti Tysse Plätzer (born Tysse; 18 January 1972) is a Norwegian race walker, who won the silver medal at the 2000 Summer Olympics in Sydney, in the 20 kilometres race. She finished 12th in the same race in the 2004 Olympic Games in Athens and 4th in the 2007 World Championships in Osaka. At the 2008 Summer Olympics in Beijing, she again won a silver medal in the 20 kilometres race.

Born in Os Municipality, she is the older sister of Erik Tysse and is married to former German middle distance runner Stephan Plätzer, who is also her coach. They have two children, Kiara Lea and Sebastian.

== Achievements ==
Year	Competition	Venue	Position	Event	Notes
Representing Norway
1986	World Junior Championships	Athens, Greece	5th	5000m	23:09.99
1986	European Championships	Stuttgart, West Germany	11th	10 km	48:28
1987	World Race Walking Cup	New York City, United States	17th	10 km	46:28
1994	European Championships	Helsinki, Finland	16th	10 km	46:10
1998	European Championships	Budapest, Hungary	9th	10 km	43:49
1999	World Championships	Seville, Spain	9th	20 km	1:32:42
2000	European Race Walking Cup	Eisenhüttenstadt, Germany	3rd	20 km	1:27:53
2000	Olympic Games	Sydney, Australia	2nd	20 km	1:29:33
2001	European Race Walking Cup	Dudince, Slovakia	—	20 km	DNF
2001	World Championships	Edmonton, Canada	—	20 km	DSQ
2002	European Championships	Munich, Germany	—	20 km	DSQ
2003	World Championships	Paris, France	—	20 km	DSQ
2004	Olympic Games	Athens, Greece	12th	20 km	1:30:49
2006	European Championships	Gothenburg, Sweden	4th	20 km	1:28:45
2007	World Championships	Osaka, Japan	4th	20 km	1:31:24
2008	Olympic Games	Beijing, China	2nd	20 km	1:27:07
2009	World Championships	Berlin, Germany	—	20 km	DSQ
