= Olga Kaniskina =

Russian race walker (born 1985)

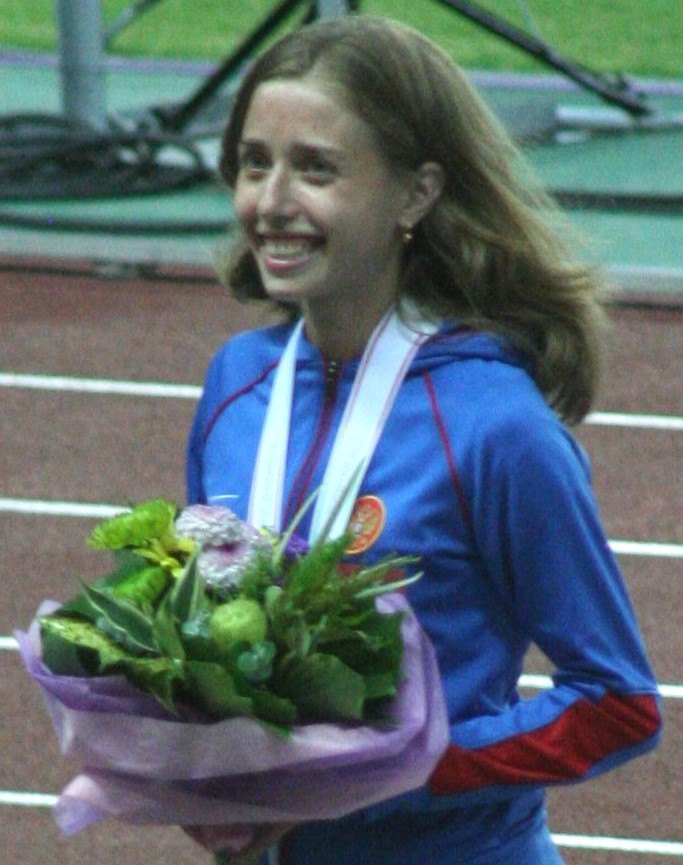
- Kaniskina at Osaka 2007

Personal information
- Born: January 19, 1985 (age 41) Napolnaya Tavla, Kochkurovsky District, Mordovian ASSR, Russian SFSR, Soviet Union
- Height: 1.59 m (5 ft 2 1/2 in)
- Weight: 43 kg (95 lb)

Sport
- Country: Russia
- Sport: Women's athletics
- Event: 20 km walk
Medal record
| Event | 1st | 2nd | 3rd |
|---|---|---|---|
| Olympic Games | 1 | 0 | 0 |
| World Championships | 1 | 0 | 0 |
| European Championships | 0 | 1 | 0 |
| Total | 2 | 1 | 0 |
Olympic Games
| Gold medal – first place | 2008 Beijing | 20 km walk |
| Disqualified | 2012 London | 20 km walk |
World Championships
| Gold medal – first place | 2007 Osaka | 20 km walk |
European Championships
| Silver medal – second place | 2006 Gothenburg | 20 km walk |

Olga Nikolayevna Kaniskina (Russian: О́льга Никола́евна Кани́ськина; born January 19, 1985 in Napolnaya Tavla, Kochkurovsky District, Mordovian ASSR, Russian SFSR, Soviet Union) is a Russian coach and former race walker. She won the silver medal in the 20 km walk at the 2006 European Championships, the gold medal at the 2007 World Championships, and the gold medal at the 2008 Beijing Olympics. She also won the 20 km walk at the 2008 IAAF World Race Walking Cup, setting a Championship record of 1:25:42. She was disqualified from several years of competition due to doping.

== Career ==
At the 2006 IAAF World Race Walking Cup Kaniskina finished in fifth place and won her first major medal, a silver, at the 2006 European Athletics Championships later that year. She won her first global title the following year, taking the gold in the women's 20 km walk at the 2007 World Championships in Athletics, beating compatriot Tatyana Shemyakina to the finish.

The 2008 season saw Kaniskina break her first world record in the 20 km Walk at the Russian Championships. She lowered the mark set by her compatriot Olimpiada Ivanova in August 2005. However, IAAF rules dictate that 3 official judges must be present at the race for a world record to be ratified, making it unlikely that this record would be ratified, as there were not 3 judges present. She went on to set the 20 km championship record at the 2008 IAAF World Race Walking Cup held in Russia, finishing with a time of 1:25:42.

At the 2008 Olympics in Beijing, she broke the standing Olympic record for the fastest 20 km walk. She walked 20 km in 1:26:31 to beat the silver medalist by 36 seconds. The previous Olympic record was 1:29:05 set by Wang Liping in 2000 at the Olympic Games in Sydney, Australia.

She continued her run of success by winning her second World gold medal at the 2009 World Championships in Athletics, becoming the first woman to win the title consecutively.

Kaniskina's first win of 2010 came at the Na Rynek Marsz! competition in Kraków, Poland, where she beat Melanie Seeger by two seconds. She improved one position from her 2006 performance to top the podium at the 2010 European Athletics Championships, claiming the women's 20 km title. Her 2011 started with a win on the 2011 World Challenge circuit in Rio Maior in April.

At the 20 km walk during the 2012 Summer Olympics she was leading the walk from the start, but on the last kilometer was overtaken by Elena Lashmanova and won silver.

=== Disqualification ===
Kaniskina was part of a training group coached by Viktor Chegin. More than a dozen members of that group have been suspended for doping violations. She did not return to defend her world championship on home soil, similar to teammate Sergey Bakulin. It was later revealed that Bakulin was serving a previously unannounced doping suspension, casting the suggestion that Kaniskina was doing the same. On January 20, 2015, Kaniskina was disqualified for 3 years and 2 months starting from 15 October 2012, and all her results between 15 July 2009 and 16 September 2009, as well as between 30 July 2011 and 8 November 2011 (which included two world championship golds) were annulled. The reason for the ban was anomalies in her biological passport.

On March 25, 2015, the IAAF filed an appeal with the Court of Arbitration in Lausanne, Switzerland, questioning the selective disqualification of the suspension periods of the six athletes involved, including the one for Kaniskina which had allowed her to keep her Olympic silver medal.

Kaniskina received prize money of around $135,000 from the government at events from which she was later disqualified.

== International competitions ==
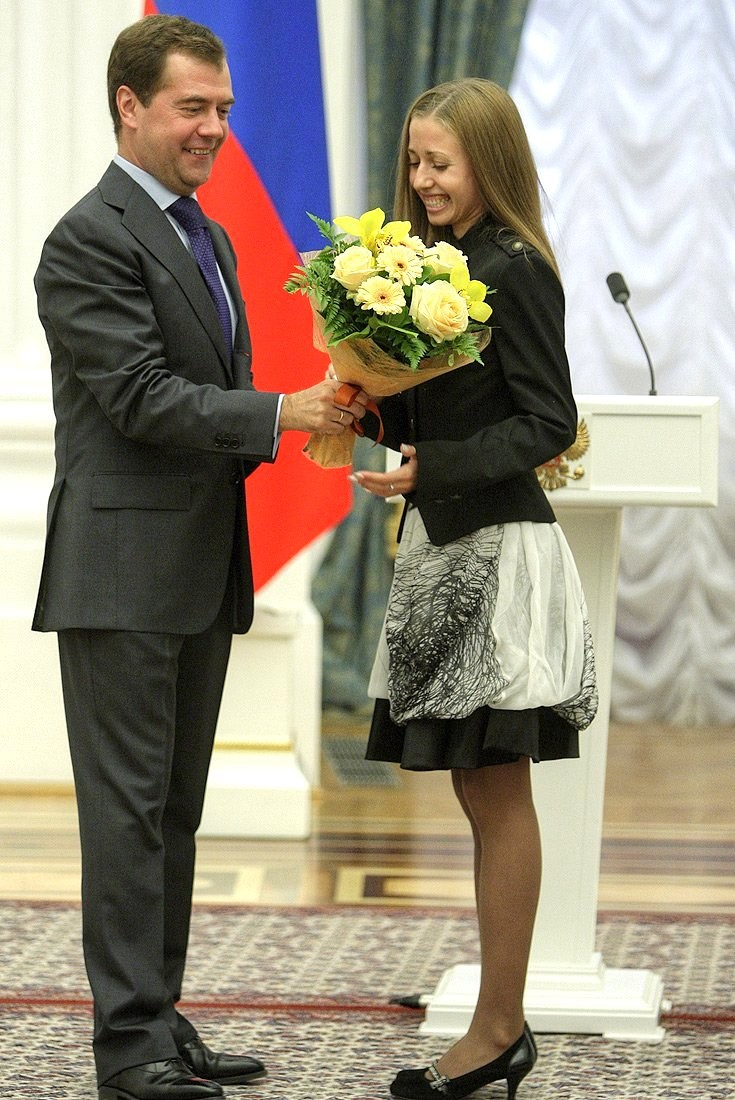
Russian president Dmitry Medvedev awarding Olga Kaniskina in Moscow Kremlin in 2009.

Representing Russia
| Year | Competition | Venue | Position | Event | Result | Notes |
|---|---|---|---|---|---|---|
| 2005 | European U23 Championships | Erfurt, Germany | 2nd | 20 km | 1:33:33 | |
| 2006 | World Race Walking Cup | A Coruña, Spain | 5th | 20 km | 1:28:59 | |
| 2006 | European Championships | Gothenburg, Sweden | 2nd | 20 km | 1:28:35 | |
| 2007 | European Race Walking Cup | Leamington Spa, United Kingdom | 2nd | 20 km | 1:28:13 | |
| 2007 | World Championships | Osaka, Japan | 1st | 20 km | 1:30:09 | |
| 2008 | World Race Walking Cup | Cheboksary, Russia | 1st | 20 km | 1:25:42 | CR |
| 2008 | Olympic Games | Beijing, China | 1st | 20 km | 1:26:31 | OR |
| 2009 | World Championships | Berlin, Germany | DQ | 20 km | 1:28:09 | Doping |
| 2010 | European Championships | Barcelona, Spain | DQ | 20 km | 1:27:44 | Doping |
| 2011 | World Championships | Daegu, South Korea | DQ | 20 km | 1:29:42 | Doping |
| 2012 | Olympic Games | London, United Kingdom | DQ | 20 km | 1:25:09 | Doping |
