= Valeriy Borchin =

Russian race walker (born 1986)

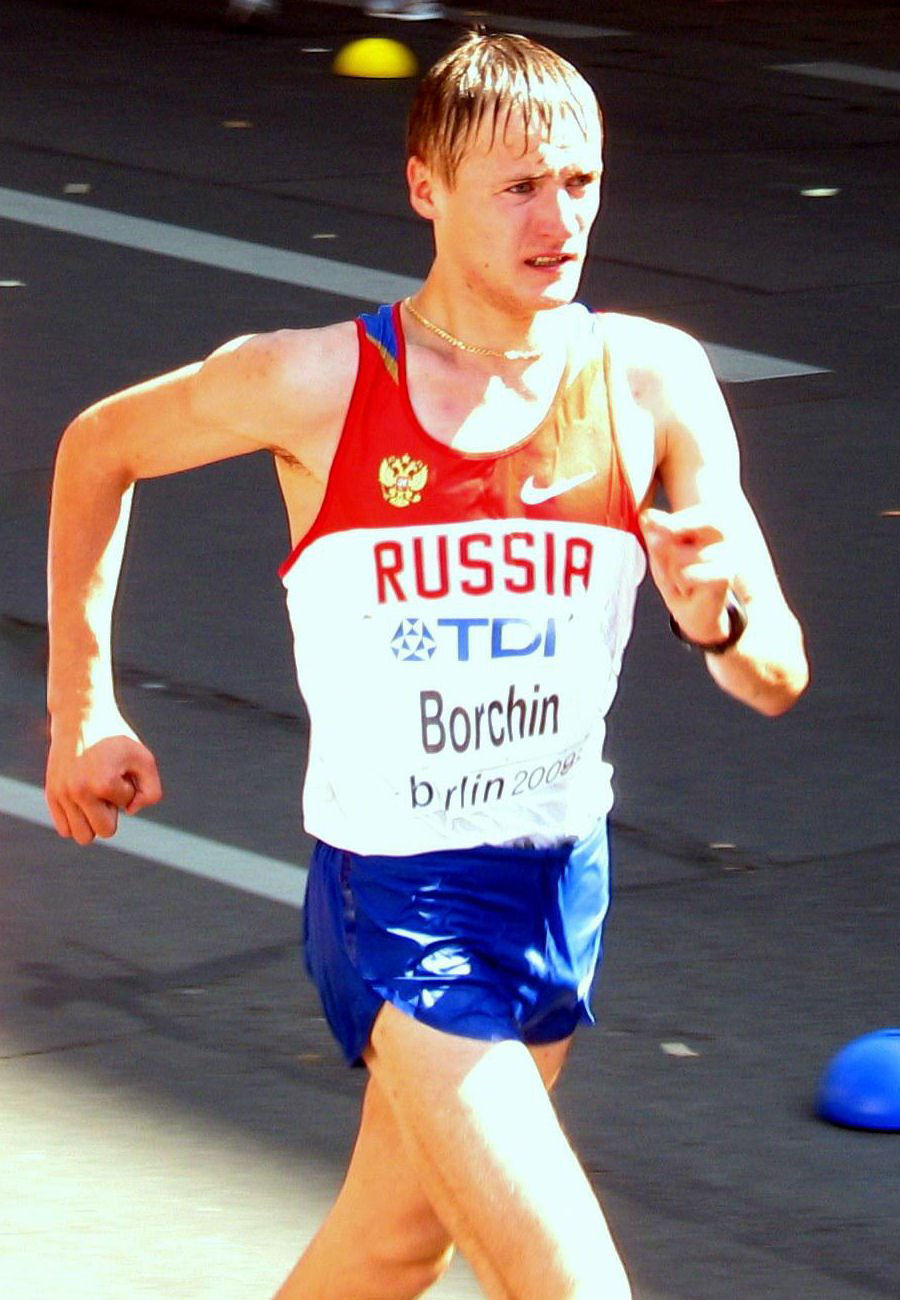
- Borchin at 2009 World Championships in Athletics in Berlin.

Personal information
- Full name: Valeriy Viktorovich Borchin
- Born: 11 September 1986 (age 39) Povadimovo, Dubyonsky District, Mordovian ASSR, Russian SFSR, Soviet Union
- Height: 1.78 m (5 ft 10 in)
- Weight: 63 kg (139 lb)

Sport
- Country: Russia
- Sport: Men's athletics
- Event: 20km Race Walk
Medal record
Olympic Games
Gold medal – first place	2008 Beijing	20 km walk
European Championships
Silver medal – second place	2006 Gothenburg	20 km walk

Valeriy Viktorovich Borchin (Russian: Вале́рий Ви́кторович Бо́рчин; born 11 September 1986) is a race walker from Russia who won the 2008 Olympic gold medal and was World champion over the 20 km distance. His World Championship was retroactively stripped in 2015 due to doping.

== Biography ==
He was born in the village of Povadimovo near Saransk in what is now the Republic of Mordovia. After trying out weightlifting and long-distance running in his youth, he began practising racewalking at the age of seventeen after a knee injury. He met Viktor Chegin, a prominent Olympic-level coach in the region, in 2004 and began practising with his training group. The year after he was the runner-up in the junior 10 km walk in the national championships. However, he received a year-long ban from competition soon after, lasting from June 2005 to 2006, after he failed an in-competition drugs test for the banned stimulant ephedrine.

Upon his return to competition, he took the senior national title and won the 20 km walk silver medal at the 2006 European Athletics Championships. Borchin formed part of a Russian medal sweep at the 2007 European Athletics U23 Championships, taking the gold medal and he competed at the 2007 World Championships in Athletics later that year, but did not manage to finish the race. He was runner-up to Paquillo Fernández at the 2008 IAAF World Race Walking Cup in Cheboksary in May, leading Russia to the team victory.

A week prior to the 2008 Summer Olympics, his coach Viktor Chegin admitted that Borchin and fellow Russian walker Vladimir Kanaykin had failed an out-of-competition test in April that year, testing positive for the blood-booster EPO. However, Borchin dismissed the claims, saying he had not given a positive test and he not trained with or spoken to any of the other Russian walkers. Borchin was allowed to compete and won the gold medal in the 20 km race at the Olympics. It was not explained why Borchin was allowed to compete – in spite the admittance of a positive test by the Russian Athletics Federation, he did not receive a doping ban and was allowed to keep his medal and continue racing.

He won his first world title the next year with a victory at the 2009 World Championships. Borchin was absent for the 2010 season, which featured no major championships, and returned to compete the following year. He opened his 2011 season with a win at the 20th edition of the International Race Walking Grand Prix in Rio Maior in April.

=== 2012 Olympics ===
In the 20 kilometre walk during the 2012 London Olympics, Borchin collapsed within 2 kilometres (1.6 miles) of the finish. The race was eventually won by Chen Ding of the People's Republic of China.

=== Disqualification ===
On 20 January 2015 Borchin was disqualified for 8 years starting from 15 October 2012, and all his results between 14 July 2009 and 15 September 2009, between 16 June 2011 and 27 September 2011 as well as between 11 April 2012 and 3 September 2012 (which include two world championship golds) were annulled. On 25 March 2015 the IAAF filed an appeal with the Court of Arbitration in Lausanne, Switzerland, questioning the selective disqualification of the suspension periods of the six athletes involved including Borchin. On March 24, 2015, the court rules all of his marks from August 14, 2009, to October 15, 2012, were also disqualified.

== See also ==
- List of doping cases in athletics
