= 2007 European Race Walking Cup =

- Organisers: EAA
- Edition: 7th
- Date: 20 May
- Host city: Victoria Park, Royal Leamington Spa, Warwickshire, United Kingdom
- Events: 5
- Participation: 249 athletes from 29 nations

The 2007 European Race Walking Cup was held in Victoria Park, Royal Leamington Spa, United Kingdom, on 20 May 2007.

Complete results were published. The junior events are documented on the World Junior Athletics History webpages. Medal winners were published on the Athletics Weekly website.

== Medallists ==
Event	Gold		Silver		Bronze	
Men
20 km	Yohan Diniz (FRA)	1:18:58	Ivano Brugnetti (ITA)	1:19:36	Igor Yerokhin (RUS)	1:20:09
50 km	Vladimir Kanaykin (RUS)	3:40:57	Trond Nymark (NOR)	3:41:31	Oleg Kistkin (RUS)	3:41:51
10 km Junior	Sergey Morozov (RUS)	40:25	Miguel Ángel López (ESP)	40:49	Dmitriy Shorin (RUS)	41:38
Team (Men)
20 km	Belarus	29 pts	Italy	32 pts	Spain	39 pts
50 km	Russia	8 pts	Spain	23 pts	France	43 pts
10 km Junior	Russia	4 pts	Spain	6 pts	France	25 pts
Women
20 km	Ryta Turava (BLR)	1:27:52	Olga Kaniskina (RUS)	1:28:13	Elena Ginko (BLR)	1:28:29
10 km Junior	Anisya Kornikova (RUS)	43:17	Yelena Shumkina (RUS)	44:29	Irina Yumanova (RUS)	45:45
Team (Women)
20 km	Belarus	16 pts	Russia	18 pts	Spain	25 pts
10 km Junior	Russia	3 pts	Romania	9 pts	Ukraine	20 pts

== Results ==
=== Men's 20 km ===
Place	Athlete	Nation	Time
1st place, gold medalist(s)	Yohan Diniz	France (FRA)	1:18:58
2nd place, silver medalist(s)	Ivano Brugnetti	Italy (ITA)	1:19:36
3rd place, bronze medalist(s)	Igor Yerokhin	Russia (RUS)	1:20:09
4	Ivan Trotski	Belarus (BLR)	1:20:13
5	Robert Heffernan	Ireland (IRL)	1:20:15
6	André Höhne	Germany (GER)	1:20:32
7	João Vieira	Portugal (POR)	1:20:42
8	Siarhei Charnou	Belarus (BLR)	1:21:02
9	Valeriy Borchin	Russia (RUS)	1:21:13
10	Giorgio Rubino	Italy (ITA)	1:21:17
11	Erik Tysse	Norway (NOR)	1:21:33
12	Juan Manuel Molina	Spain (ESP)	1:21:48
13	Benjamin Sánchez	Spain (ESP)	1:21:48
14	José Ignacio Díaz	Spain (ESP)	1:21:57
15	Benjamin Kuciński	Poland (POL)	1:21:58
16	Rafał Augustyn	Poland (POL)	1:22:08
17	Andrei Talashka	Belarus (BLR)	1:22:18
18	Andriy Kovenko	Ukraine (UKR)	1:22:28
19	Luis Manuel Corchete	Spain (ESP)	1:23:14
20	Fortunato D'Onofrio	Italy (ITA)	1:23:37
21	Mikalai Seradovich	Belarus (BLR)	1:23:45
22	Artem Valchenko	Ukraine (UKR)	1:24:03
23	Sérgio Vieira	Portugal (POR)	1:24:23
24	Diogo Martins	Portugal (POR)	1:24:45
25	Donatas Škarnulis	Lithuania (LTU)	1:24:47
26	Ivan Losev	Ukraine (UKR)	1:25:11
27	Matej Tóth	Slovakia (SVK)	1:25:12
28	Colin Griffin	Ireland (IRL)	1:25:14
29	Franck Delree	France (FRA)	1:25:28
30	Maik Berger	Germany (GER)	1:25:40
31	Jakub Jelonek	Poland (POL)	1:25:52
32	Sébastien Biche	France (FRA)	1:26:04
33	Miloš Bátovský	Slovakia (SVK)	1:26:22
34	Andrey Ruzavin	Russia (RUS)	1:26:23
35	Hervé Davaux	France (FRA)	1:26:26
36	Jarkko Kinnunen	Finland (FIN)	1:26:28
37	Marius Žiūkas	Lithuania (LTU)	1:26:31
38	Ato Ibañez	Sweden (SWE)	1:26:33
39	Jean-Jacques Nkouloukidi	Italy (ITA)	1:26:51
40	Theódoros Koupídis	Greece (GRE)	1:26:58
41	Vilius Mikelionis	Lithuania (LTU)	1:27:01
42	Dionísio Ventura	Portugal (POR)	1:27:38
43	Peter Korčok	Slovakia (SVK)	1:28:11
44	Gyula Dudás	Hungary (HUN)	1:28:43
45	Sándor Rácz	Hungary (HUN)	1:29:01
46	Jeffrey Cassin	Ireland (IRL)	1:29:06
47	Ruslan Dmytrenko	Ukraine (UKR)	1:29:16
48	Dan King	Great Britain (GBR)	1:30:59
49	Jani Lehtinen	Finland (FIN)	1:33:36
50	Jacob Sørensen	Denmark (DEN)	1:36:12
51	Jacques van Bremen	Netherlands (NED)	1:36:33
52	Virgo Adusoo	Estonia (EST)	1:41:31
53	Alexander Maier	Austria (AUT)	1:50:31
–	Recep Çelik	Turkey (TUR)	DQ
–	Levente Kapéri	Hungary (HUN)	DQ
–	Margus Luik	Estonia (EST)	DQ
–	Lauri Lelumees	Estonia (EST)	DQ
–	Tadas Šuškevičius	Lithuania (LTU)	DQ
–	Tibor Márta	Hungary (HUN)	DQ
–	Harold van Beek	Netherlands (NED)	DNF
–	Viktor Burayev	Russia (RUS)	DNF
–	Grzegorz Sudoł	Poland (POL)	DNS

==== Team (20 km Men) ====
Place	Country	Points
1st place, gold medalist(s)	Belarus	29 pts
2nd place, silver medalist(s)	Italy	32 pts
3rd place, bronze medalist(s)	Spain	39 pts
4	Russia	46 pts
5	Portugal	54 pts
6	France	62 pts
7	Poland	62 pts
8	Ukraine	66 pts
9	Ireland	79 pts
10	Lithuania	103 pts
11	Slovakia	103 pts

=== Men's 50 km ===
Place	Athlete	Nation	Time
1st place, gold medalist(s)	Vladimir Kanaykin	Russia (RUS)	3:40:57
2nd place, silver medalist(s)	Trond Nymark	Norway (NOR)	3:41:31
3rd place, bronze medalist(s)	Oleg Kistkin	Russia (RUS)	3:41:51
4	Aleksey Voyevodin	Russia (RUS)	3:41:52
5	Yuriy Andronov	Russia (RUS)	3:42:55
6	Jesús Ángel García	Spain (ESP)	3:46:08
7	Santiago Pérez	Spain (ESP)	3:46:56
8	Marco De Luca	Italy (ITA)	3:47:04
9	Rafał Fedaczyński	Poland (POL)	3:48:07
10	Francisco José Pinardo	Spain (ESP)	3:50:53
11	Eddy Riva	France (FRA)	3:51:34
12	David Boulanger	France (FRA)	3:51:48
13	Vitaliy Talankou	Belarus (BLR)	3:51:59
14	António Pereira	Portugal (POR)	3:52:17
15	Jamie Costin	Ireland (IRL)	3:53:30
16	Augusto Cardoso	Portugal (POR)	3:55:14
17	Ingus Janevics	Latvia (LAT)	3:55:40
18	Diego Cafagna	Italy (ITA)	3:55:52
19	José Alejandro Cambil	Spain (ESP)	3:56:16
20	Denis Langlois	France (FRA)	3:57:01
21	Anton Kučmín	Slovakia (SVK)	3:57:41
22	Jorge Costa	Portugal (POR)	3:57:44
23	Antti Kempas	Finland (FIN)	3:57:59
24	Oleksiy Shelest	Ukraine (UKR)	3:58:10
25	Igors Kazakevičs	Latvia (LAT)	3:59:56
26	Andreas Gustafsson	Sweden (SWE)	4:00:48
27	Oleksiy Kazanin	Ukraine (UKR)	4:02:27
28	Zóltan Czukor	Hungary (HUN)	4:03:37
29	Nenad Filipović	Serbia (SRB)	4:03:42
30	Konstadínos Stefanópoulos	Greece (GRE)	4:03:42
31	Serhiy Budza	Ukraine (UKR)	4:04:38
32	Aleksandar Raković	Serbia (SRB)	4:05:38
33	Fredrik Svensson	Sweden (SWE)	4:07:55
34	Dario Privitera	Italy (ITA)	4:08:38
35	Johan Augeron	France (FRA)	4:11:50
36	Roman Bílek	Czech Republic (CZE)	4:12:38
–	Yury Varanchuk	Belarus (BLR)	DQ
–	Maciej Rosiewicz	Poland (POL)	DQ
–	Attila Vozár	Hungary (HUN)	DQ
–	Uģis Brūvelis	Latvia (LAT)	DQ
–	Oleksandr Romanenko	Ukraine (UKR)	DNF
–	Modris Liepiņš	Latvia (LAT)	DNF
–	Andrei Stsepanchuk	Belarus (BLR)	DNF
–	Pedro Martins	Portugal (POR)	DNF
–	Alessandro Garozzo	Italy (ITA)	DNF
–	Bruno Grandjean	Switzerland (SUI)	DNF
–	Kamil Kalka	Poland (POL)	DNF

==== Team (50 km Men) ====
Place	Country	Points
1st place, gold medalist(s)	Russia	8 pts
2nd place, silver medalist(s)	Spain	23 pts
3rd place, bronze medalist(s)	France	43 pts
4	Portugal	52 pts
5	Italy	60 pts
6	Latvia	79 pts
7	Ukraine	82 pts

=== Men's 10 km (Junior) ===
Place	Athlete	Nation	Time
1st place, gold medalist(s)	Sergey Morozov	Russia (RUS)	40:25
2nd place, silver medalist(s)	Miguel Ángel López	Spain (ESP)	40:49
3rd place, bronze medalist(s)	Dmitriy Shorin	Russia (RUS)	41:38
4	Manuel Torlá	Spain (ESP)	41:46
5	Lluís Torlá	Spain (ESP)	41:49
6	Aliaksandr Liakhovich	Belarus (BLR)	42:03
7	Christopher Linke	Germany (GER)	42:10
8	Arnis Rumbenieks	Latvia (LAT)	42:13
9	Edikt Khaybullin	Russia (RUS)	42:39
10	Kevin Campion	France (FRA)	43:10
11	Alin Ciobotaru	Romania (ROU)	43:17
12	Yaroslav Borodinov	Ukraine (UKR)	43:20
13	Alexandros Papamichail	Greece (GRE)	43:21
14	Máté Helebrandt	Hungary (HUN)	43:23
15	Damien Molmy	France (FRA)	43:37
16	Wojciech Halman	Poland (POL)	43:46
17	Andrea Adragna	Italy (ITA)	43:47
18	Oleksandr Hryshchuk	Ukraine (UKR)	43:49
19	Michał Stasiewicz	Poland (POL)	43:58
20	Ihar Hladkou	Belarus (BLR)	44:01
21	Patryk Rogowski	Poland (POL)	44:07
22	Federico Tontodonati	Italy (ITA)	44:11
23	Mehdi Boufraine	France (FRA)	44:13
24	Mykola Lukianchuk	Ukraine (UKR)	44:19
25	Tautvydas Žėkas	Lithuania (LTU)	44:40
26	Ben Wears	Great Britain (GBR)	44:41
27	Ridvan Çelik	Turkey (TUR)	44:48
28	Paul Fitzpatrick	Ireland (IRL)	45:40
29	Balázs Havasi	Hungary (HUN)	45:49
30	Vasílios Hrisikós	Greece (GRE)	45:50
31	Perseus Karlström	Sweden (SWE)	46:18
32	Abdürrahim Çelik	Turkey (TUR)	46:23
33	Raimondas Grigas	Lithuania (LTU)	46:37
34	Ainar Veskus	Estonia (EST)	47:07
35	Risko Nogaelainen	Estonia (EST)	47:46
36	Christophe Bürki	Switzerland (SUI)	47:53
37	Andreas Nielsen	Denmark (DEN)	47:54
–	Dzmitry Hamzunau	Belarus (BLR)	DQ
–	Balázs Darabos	Hungary (HUN)	DQ
–	Matteo Giupponi	Italy (ITA)	DQ

==== Team (10 km Junior Men) ====
Place	Country	Points
1st place, gold medalist(s)	Russia	4 pts
2nd place, silver medalist(s)	Spain	6 pts
3rd place, bronze medalist(s)	France	25 pts
4	Belarus	26 pts
5	Ukraine	30 pts
6	Poland	35 pts
7	Italy	39 pts
8	Greece	43 pts
9	Hungary	43 pts
10	Lithuania	58 pts
11	Turkey	59 pts
12	Estonia	69 pts

=== Women's 20 km ===
Place	Athlete	Nation	Time
1st place, gold medalist(s)	Ryta Turava	Belarus (BLR)	1:27:52
2nd place, silver medalist(s)	Olga Kaniskina	Russia (RUS)	1:28:13
3rd place, bronze medalist(s)	Elena Ginko	Belarus (BLR)	1:28:29
4	Elisa Rigaudo	Italy (ITA)	1:29:15
5	María Vasco	Spain (ESP)	1:29:17
6	Tatyana Sibileva	Russia (RUS)	1:30:11
7	Inês Henriques	Portugal (POR)	1:30:24
8	Claudia Ștef	Romania (ROU)	1:30:34
9	Beatriz Pascual	Spain (ESP)	1:30:37
10	Alena Nartova	Russia (RUS)	1:30:44
11	María José Poves	Spain (ESP)	1:30:48
12	Sniazhana Yurchanka	Belarus (BLR)	1:31:12
13	Vira Zozulya	Ukraine (UKR)	1:31:13
14	Susana Feitor	Portugal (POR)	1:31:28
15	Rossella Giordano	Italy (ITA)	1:32:38
16	Sylwia Korzeniowska	Poland (POL)	1:32:47
17	María Teresa Gargallo	Spain (ESP)	1:32:51
18	Vera Santos	Portugal (POR)	1:32:53
19	Sonata Milušauskaitė	Lithuania (LTU)	1:33:08
20	Zuzana Malíková	Slovakia (SVK)	1:33:37
21	Lyudmila Arkhipova	Russia (RUS)	1:33:41
22	Neringa Aidietytė	Lithuania (LTU)	1:33:54
23	Ana Maria Groza	Romania (ROU)	1:34:09
24	Mária Gáliková	Slovakia (SVK)	1:34:18
25	Olive Loughnane	Ireland (IRL)	1:34:28
26	Gisella Orsini	Italy (ITA)	1:34:37
27	Barbora Dibelková	Czech Republic (CZE)	1:34:44
28	Veronica Budileanu	Romania (ROU)	1:34:54
29	Zuzana Schindlerová	Czech Republic (CZE)	1:34:57
30	Lidia Mongelli	Italy (ITA)	1:35:25
31	Jurgita Meškauskienė	Lithuania (LTU)	1:35:39
32	Nadiya Prokopuk	Ukraine (UKR)	1:35:41
33	Marie Polli	Switzerland (SUI)	1:35:41
34	Katarzyna Kwoka	Poland (POL)	1:36:23
35	Brigita Virbalytė	Lithuania (LTU)	1:37:20
36	Evaggelía Xinoú	Greece (GRE)	1:37:56
37	Agnieszka Dygacz	Poland (POL)	1:38:30
38	Johanna Jackson	Great Britain (GBR)	1:38:56
39	Olena Shevchuk	Ukraine (UKR)	1:39:24
40	Nina Kovalchuk	Ukraine (UKR)	1:40:04
41	Laura Polli	Switzerland (SUI)	1:40:40
42	Paulina Buziak	Poland (POL)	1:40:55
43	Lisa Kehler	Great Britain (GBR)	1:41:00
44	Modra Ignate	Latvia (LAT)	1:42:09
45	Stéphanie Iund-Herledan	France (FRA)	1:42:14
46	Sandra Mitrovic	France (FRA)	1:42:24
47	Edina Füsti	Hungary (HUN)	1:42:31
48	Fabienne Chanfreau	France (FRA)	1:42:59
49	Anne-Gaëlle Retout	France (FRA)	1:44:02
50	Andrea Kovács	Hungary (HUN)	1:44:32
51	Lucie Pelantová	Czech Republic (CZE)	1:44:42
52	Katalin Varró	Hungary (HUN)	1:50:02
53	Krisztina Kerács	Hungary (HUN)	1:53:20
–	Ana Cabecinha	Portugal (POR)	DNF
–	Natalya Yatsevich	Ukraine (UKR)	DNF
–	Jolanta Dukure	Latvia (LAT)	DNF
–	Fatma Örmeci	Turkey (TUR)	DNF
–	Melanie Seeger	Germany (GER)	DNS
–	Sabine Zimmer	Germany (GER)	DNS
–	Yeliz Ay	Turkey (TUR)	DNS

==== Team (20 km Women) ====
Place	Country	Points
1st place, gold medalist(s)	Belarus	16 pts
2nd place, silver medalist(s)	Russia	18 pts
3rd place, bronze medalist(s)	Spain	25 pts
4	Portugal	39 pts
5	Italy	45 pts
6	Romania	59 pts
7	Lithuania	72 pts
8	Ukraine	84 pts
9	Poland	87 pts
10	Czech Republic	107 pts
11	France	139 pts
12	Hungary	149 pts

=== Women's 10 km Junior ===
Place	Athlete	Nation	Time
1st place, gold medalist(s)	Anisya Kornikova	Russia (RUS)	43:17
2nd place, silver medalist(s)	Yelena Shumkina	Russia (RUS)	44:29
3rd place, bronze medalist(s)	Irina Yumanova	Russia (RUS)	45:45
4	Anamaria Greceanu	Romania (ROU)	47:01
5	Georgiana Banciu	Romania (ROU)	47:33
6	Yuliya Davydenko	Ukraine (UKR)	47:42
7	Krystsina Asipenka	Belarus (BLR)	47:46
8	Lorena Castrillo	Spain (ESP)	47:47
9	Federica Ferraro	Italy (ITA)	47:54
10	Anna Mielcarek	Poland (POL)	47:55
11	Jenny Grasse	Germany (GER)	48:03
12	Federica Menzato	Italy (ITA)	48:05
13	Alexandra Gradinariu	Romania (ROU)	48:38
14	Svitlana Vavilova	Ukraine (UKR)	48:52
15	Ana Cláudia Conceição	Portugal (POR)	48:56
16	Katarzyna Golba	Poland (POL)	49:21
17	Raquel González	Spain (ESP)	49:26
18	Alba Sánchez	Spain (ESP)	49:35
19	Mária Czaková	Slovakia (SVK)	49:49
20	Sandra Krause	Germany (GER)	49:57
21	Claudia Bussu	Italy (ITA)	49:59
22	Catarina Godinho	Portugal (POR)	50:04
23	Spyridoúla Stávrou	Greece (GRE)	50:34
24	Lucyna Chruściel	Poland (POL)	50:39
25	Cecília Kardos	Hungary (HUN)	50:53
26	Anita Mészáros	Hungary (HUN)	51:36
27	Laurène Delon	France (FRA)	51:53
28	Anastasía Pouláki	Greece (GRE)	52:02
29	Barbora Strnadová	Slovakia (SVK)	52:05
30	Natalia Bakun	Ukraine (UKR)	52:10
31	Berta Kriván	Hungary (HUN)	52:13
32	Rebecca Mersh	Great Britain (GBR)	52:44
33	Laura Reynolds	Ireland (IRL)	52:53
34	Asimina Talanti	Greece (GRE)	54:12
35	Marie Le Guennec	France (FRA)	54:19
36	Ragle Raudsepp	Estonia (EST)	55:25
37	Meeli Pällin	Estonia (EST)	58:06
38	Caroline Housmans	Belgium (BEL)	1:04:00
–	Marie Masse	France (FRA)	DNF
–	Anna Karrila	Finland (FIN)	DNS

==== Team (10 km Junior Women) ====
Place	Country	Points
1st place, gold medalist(s)	Russia	3 pts
2nd place, silver medalist(s)	Romania	9 pts
3rd place, bronze medalist(s)	Ukraine	20 pts
4	Italy	21 pts
5	Spain	25 pts
6	Poland	26 pts
7	Germany	31 pts
8	Portugal	37 pts
9	Slovakia	48 pts
10	Hungary	51 pts
11	Greece	51 pts
12	France	62 pts
13	Estonia	73 pts

== Participation ==
The participation of 249 athletes ( men/ women) from 29 countries is reported.

- Austria (1)
- Belarus (13)
- Belgium (1)
- Czech Republic (4)
- Denmark (2)
- Estonia (7)
- Finland (4)
- France (18)
- Germany (7)
- Greece (8)
- Hungary (16)
- Ireland (7)
- Italy (18)
- Latvia (7)
- Lithuania (10)
- Netherlands (2)
- Norway (2)
- Poland (17)
- Portugal (14)
- Romania (7)
- Russia (18)
- Serbia (2)
- Slovakia (8)
- Spain (18)
- Sweden (4)
- Switzerland (4)
- Turkey (5)
- Ukraine (20)
- United Kingdom (5)
