= 2011 European Race Walking Cup =

- Organisers: EAA
- Edition: 9th
- Date: 21 May
- Host city: Olhão, Algarve, Portugal
- Events: 5
- Participation: 218 athletes from 25 nations
- Official website: Olhao2011

The ninth edition of the European Race Walking Cup was held on the roads of Olhão, Portugal on 21 May 2011. The event was jointly organised by the Federação Portuguesa de Atletismo (Portuguese Athletics Federation) and the European Athletics Association. A total of 222 athletes from 26 countries participated in the competition.

Olhão won the nomination as the host city in November 2009, seeing off a rival bid from Spain's Santa Eulària des Riu. Although this was Portugal's first time hosting a racewalking event of this size, it became another high profile athletics competition to be staged in the Algarve region, after the 2000 IAAF World Cross Country Championships, 2003 IAAF World Half Marathon Championships and several editions of the European Champion Clubs Cup. The city itself has, since 2001, played host to the annual Meeting de Marcha Atlética da Cidade de Olhão racewalking meeting, which has featured on the IAAF World Race Walking Challenge series.

As in previous years, the competition featured five races: two 20 km walk competitions for men and women, a 50 km men's walk, and junior walks for men and women of 10 km each. The course was a looped circuit on the roads next to Olhão's marina on the seafront of the Atlantic Ocean. Russia and Italy were the dominant teams at the competition, taking three and two team titles respectively. Italian men took a sweep of the top three in the 20 km race while Russia's junior men completed a 1–2 finish to gain a perfect team score.

== Medallists ==
=== Men ===
Race	Gold		Silver		Bronze	
Junior men's 10 km	Ihor Lyashchenko (UKR)	41:26	Hagen Pohle (GER)	41:36	Dementiy Cheparev (RUS)	41:58
Junior men's 10 km Team	Ukraine (UKR)	5 pts	Russia (RUS)	8 pts	Germany (GER)	12 pts
Senior men's 20 km	Matej Toth (SVK)	1:23:53	Jakub Jelonek (POL)	1:23:59	Benjamín Sánchez (ESP)	1:24:12
Senior men's 20 km Team	Spain (ESP)	26 pts	Italy (ITA)	27 pts	France (FRA)	37 pts
Senior men's 50 km	Denis Nizhegorodov (RUS)	3:45:58	Marco De Luca (ITA)	3:50:13	Christopher Linke (GER)	3:52:56
Senior men's 50 km Team	Italy (ITA)	16 pts	Poland (POL)	17 pts	Spain (ESP)	39 pts

=== Women ===
Race	Gold		Silver		Bronze	
Junior women's 10 km	Yelena Lashmanova (RUS)	43:10	Svetlana Vasilyeva (RUS)	44:02	Kate Veale (IRL)	46:32
Junior women's 10 km Team	Russia (RUS)	3 pts	Italy (ITA)	9 pts	Czech Republic (CZE)	19 pts
Senior women's 20 km	Vera Sokolova (RUS)	1:30:02	Anisya Kirdyapkina (RUS)	1:30:41	Elisa Rigaudo (ITA)	1:30:55
Senior women's 20 km Team	Russia (RUS)	14 pts	Spain (ESP)	22 pts	Ukraine (UKR)	32 pts

== Results ==
Complete results were published.

=== Men's 20 km ===
Place	Athlete	Nation	Time
1st place, gold medalist(s)	Matej Tóth	Slovakia (SVK)	1:23:53
2nd place, silver medalist(s)	Jakub Jelonek	Poland (POL)	1:23:59
3rd place, bronze medalist(s)	Benjamín Sánchez	Spain (ESP)	1:24:12
4	Giorgio Rubino	Italy (ITA)	1:24:14
5	Vladimir Kanaykin	Russia (RUS)	1:24:20
6	Miguel Ángel López	Spain (ESP)	1:24:37
7	Andrey Krivov	Russia (RUS)	1:25:14
8	Antonin Boyez	France (FRA)	1:25:21
9	Robert Heffernan	Ireland (IRL)	1:25:34
10	Kevin Campion	France (FRA)	1:25:50
11	Matteo Giupponi	Italy (ITA)	1:26:30
12	Federico Tontodonati	Italy (ITA)	1:26:59
13	Nazar Kovalenko	Ukraine (UKR)	1:27:03
14	Pedro Isidro	Portugal (POR)	1:27:39
15	Antón Kučmín	Slovakia (SVK)	1:28:14
16	Grzegorz Sudoł	Poland (POL)	1:28:49
17	Francisco Arcilla	Spain (ESP)	1:28:59
18	Marius Žiūkas	Lithuania (LTU)	1:29:16
19	Emmanuel Boulay	France (FRA)	1:29:45
20	Rafał Sikora	Poland (POL)	1:29:52
21	Aku Partanen	Finland (FIN)	1:29:54
22	Dawid Wolski	Poland (POL)	1:30:33
23	Alex Wright	Great Britain (GBR)	1:30:36
24	José Ignacio Díaz	Spain (ESP)	1:31:05
25	Bertrand Moulinet	France (FRA)	1:31:26
26	Oleksandr Venhlovskyy	Ukraine (UKR)	1:31:30
27	Brendan Boyce	Ireland (IRL)	1:32:17
28	Heikki Kukkonen	Finland (FIN)	1:32:29
29	Tom Bosworth	Great Britain (GBR)	1:32:48
30	Ruslan Dmytrenko	Ukraine (UKR)	1:32:55
31	Michael Doyle	Ireland (IRL)	1:34:24
32	Kemal Gelecek	Turkey (TUR)	1:36:35
33	Karel Ketner	Czech Republic (CZE)	1:40:18
34	Lauri Lelumees	Estonia (EST)	1:42:57
—	Andreas Nielsen	Denmark (DEN)	DNF
—	Akim Ovsjannikov	Estonia (EST)	DNF
—	Ben Wears	Great Britain (GBR)	DNF
—	André Höhne	Germany (GER)	DNF
—	Carsten Schmidt	Germany (GER)	DNF
—	Máté Helebrandt	Hungary (HUN)	DNF
—	Daniele Paris	Italy (ITA)	DNF
—	João Vieira	Portugal (POR)	DNF
—	Sérgio Vieira	Portugal (POR)	DNF
—	Perseus Karlström	Sweden (SWE)	DNF
—	Recep Çelik	Turkey (TUR)	DNF
—	Eemeli Kiiski	Finland (FIN)	DQ
—	Dan King	Great Britain (GBR)	DQ
—	Tadas Šuškevičius	Lithuania (LTU)	DQ
—	Stanislav Yemelyanov	Russia (RUS)	DQ IAAF Rule 32.2.b (Doping)
—	Sergey Morozov	Russia (RUS)	DQ IAAF Rule 32.2.b (Doping)

==== Team (20 km Men) ====
Place	Country	Points
1st place, gold medalist(s)	Spain	26 pts
2nd place, silver medalist(s)	Italy	27 pts
3rd place, bronze medalist(s)	France	37 pts
4	Poland	38 pts
5	Ireland	67 pts
6	Ukraine	69 pts

=== Men's 50 km ===
Place	Athlete	Nation	Time
1st place, gold medalist(s)	Denis Nizhegorodov	Russia (RUS)	3:45:58
2nd place, silver medalist(s)	Marco De Luca	Italy (ITA)	3:50:13
3rd place, bronze medalist(s)	Christopher Linke	Germany (GER)	3:52:56
4	Artur Brzozowski	Poland (POL)	3:53:51
5	Jean-Jacques Nkouloukidi	Italy (ITA)	3:54:19
6	Rafał Augustyn	Poland (POL)	3:54:38
7	Michał Stasiewicz	Poland (POL)	4:02:51
8	Oleksiy Kazanin	Ukraine (UKR)	4:03:19
9	Lorenzo Dessi	Italy (ITA)	4:04:00
10	Teodorico Caporaso	Italy (ITA)	4:04:12
11	Denis Strelkov	Russia (RUS)	4:04:36
12	Luís Manuel Corchete	Spain (ESP)	4:05:25
13	Miguel Ángel Prieto	Spain (ESP)	4:06:45
14	Ferrán Collados	Spain (ESP)	4:06:57
15	Predrag Filipović	Serbia (SRB)	4:07:54
16	Xavier Le Coz	France (FRA)	4:08:04
17	Ivan Losev	Ukraine (UKR)	4:10:02
18	Augusto Cardoso	Portugal (POR)	4:10:03
19	Ato Ibáñez	Sweden (SWE)	4:10:54
20	Dzianis Krauchuk	Belarus (BLR)	4:13:31
21	Claudio Villanueva	Spain (ESP)	4:14:27
22	Dušan Majdán	Slovakia (SVK)	4:15:10
23	Serhiy Budza	Ukraine (UKR)	4:16:26
24	Dominic King	Great Britain (GBR)	4:18:56
25	Jorge Costa	Portugal (POR)	4:25:04
26	Sándor Rácz	Hungary (HUN)	4:28:09
27	Róbert Tubak	Hungary (HUN)	4:33:47
28	Margus Luik	Estonia (EST)	4:34:11
—	Dzmitry Dziubin	Belarus (BLR)	DNF
—	Andrei Talashka	Belarus (BLR)	DNF
—	Ivan Trotski	Belarus (BLR)	DNF
—	Antti Kempas	Finland (FIN)	DNF
—	Hervé Davaux	France (FRA)	DNF
—	Colin Griffin	Ireland (IRL)	DNF
—	Vjaceslavs Grigorjevs	Latvia (LAT)	DNF
—	Arnis Rumbenieks	Latvia (LAT)	DNF
—	Trond Nymark	Norway (NOR)	DNF
—	Pedro Martins	Portugal (POR)	DNF
—	António Pereira	Portugal (POR)	DNF
—	Andrey Ruzavin	Russia (RUS)	DNF
—	Vladimir Savanović	Serbia (SRB)	DNF
—	Alex Flórez	Switzerland (SUI)	DNF
—	Miloš Bátovský	Slovakia (SVK)	DNF
—	Maksym Kovalenko	Ukraine (UKR)	DNF
—	Janis Strautinš	Latvia (LAT)	DQ
—	Nenad Filipović	Serbia (SRB)	DQ
—	Andreas Gustafsson	Sweden (SWE)	DQ
—	Igor Yerokhin	Russia (RUS)	DQ; IAAF Rule 32.2.b (Doping)

==== Team (50 km Men) ====
Place	Country	Points
1st place, gold medalist(s)	Italy	16 pts
2nd place, silver medalist(s)	Poland	17 pts
3rd place, bronze medalist(s)	Spain	39 pts
4	Ukraine	48 pts

=== Men's 10 km (Junior) ===
Place	Athlete	Nation	Time
1st place, gold medalist(s)	Ihor Lyashchenko	Ukraine (UKR)	41:26
2nd place, silver medalist(s)	Hagen Pohle	Germany (GER)	41:36
3rd place, bronze medalist(s)	Dementiy Cheparev	Russia (RUS)	41:58
4	Oleksandr Verbytskyy	Ukraine (UKR)	42:09
5	Pavel Parshin	Russia (RUS)	42:16
6	Alvaro Martin	Spain (ESP)	42:17
7	Luís Alberto Amezcua	Spain (ESP)	43:10
8	Leonardo Dei Tos	Italy (ITA)	43:21
9	Patrik Spevák	Slovakia (SVK)	43:41
10	Marcel Lehmberg	Germany (GER)	43:48
11	Dimitri Malosse	France (FRA)	43:52
12	Aleksi Ojala	Finland (FIN)	44:00
13	Nicolas Gosselin	France (FRA)	44:03
14	Massimo Stano	Italy (ITA)	44:35
15	Ihor Puzanov	Ukraine (UKR)	44:48
16	Juan Antonio Raya	Spain (ESP)	44:49
17	Sahin Senoduncu	Turkey (TUR)	45:14
18	Viktor Márkus	Hungary (HUN)	45:43
19	Samuel Pereira	Portugal (POR)	45:46
20	Miklós Srp	Hungary (HUN)	45:51
21	Marcel Faber	Slovakia (SVK)	46:06
22	Bruno Pedro	Portugal (POR)	46:19
23	Leonardo Serra	Italy (ITA)	46:44
24	Edgars Gjačs	Latvia (LAT)	46:55
25	Anders Hansson	Sweden (SWE)	46:56
26	Adrian Dragomir	Romania (ROU)	47:00
27	Evan Lynch	Ireland (IRL)	47:08
28	Valters Gerinš	Latvia (LAT)	47:21
29	Romain Denimal	France (FRA)	47:26
30	Jamie Higgins	Great Britain (GBR)	47:28
31	Andrzej Łobaczewski	Poland (POL)	47:47
32	Peter Tichý	Slovakia (SVK)	47:57
33	Jakub Herba	Poland (POL)	48:42
34	Łukasz Kostka	Poland (POL)	49:04
35	Ozgur Ozan Pamuk	Turkey (TUR)	49:12
—	Damir Baybikov	Russia (RUS)	DQ

==== Team (10 km Junior Men) ====
Place	Country	Points
1st place, gold medalist(s)	Ukraine	5 pts
2nd place, silver medalist(s)	Russia	8 pts
3rd place, bronze medalist(s)	Germany	12 pts
4	Spain	13 pts
5	Italy	22 pts
6	France	24 pts
7	Slovakia	30 pts
8	Hungary	38 pts
9	Portugal	41 pts
10	Turkey	52 pts
11	Latvia	52 pts
12	Poland	64 pts

=== Women's 20 km ===
Place	Athlete	Nation	Time
1st place, gold medalist(s)	Vera Sokolova	Russia (RUS)	1:30:02
2nd place, silver medalist(s)	Anisya Kirdyapkina	Russia (RUS)	1:30:41
3rd place, bronze medalist(s)	Elisa Rigaudo	Italy (ITA)	1:30:55
4	María Vasco	Spain (ESP)	1:31:41
5	Olha Yakovenko	Ukraine (UKR)	1:32:08
6	Melanie Seeger	Germany (GER)	1:32:14
7	Nadiya Borovska	Ukraine (UKR)	1:32:30
8	María José Poves	Spain (ESP)	1:32:36
9	Susana Feitor	Portugal (POR)	1:32:43
10	Julia Takács	Spain (ESP)	1:33:09
11	Anna Lukyanova	Russia (RUS)	1:33:27
12	Johanna Jackson	Great Britain (GBR)	1:33:53
13	Inês Henriques	Portugal (POR)	1:34:11
14	Zuzana Schindlerová	Czech Republic (CZE)	1:34:15
15	Ana Cabecinha	Portugal (POR)	1:34:31
16	Brigita Virbalytė-Dimšienė	Lithuania (LTU)	1:34:35
17	Nastassia Yatsevich	Belarus (BLR)	1:35:21
18	Marie Polli	Switzerland (SUI)	1:35:37
19	Federica Ferraro	Italy (ITA)	1:35:48
20	Olena Shumkina	Ukraine (UKR)	1:36:20
21	Laura Reynolds	Ireland (IRL)	1:36:31
22	Tatyana Korotkova	Russia (RUS)	1:36:43
23	Neringa Aidietytė	Lithuania (LTU)	1:36:55
24	Ana Maria Groza	Romania (ROU)	1:37:18
25	Katarzyna Kwoka	Poland (POL)	1:37:23
26	Lucie Pelantová	Czech Republic (CZE)	1:37:37
27	Karoliina Kaasalainen	Finland (FIN)	1:38:21
28	Eleonora Giorgi	Italy (ITA)	1:38:29
29	Emilie Menuet	France (FRA)	1:38:33
30	Antonella Palmisano	Italy (ITA)	1:39:00
31	Agnieszka Dygacz	Poland (POL)	1:39:16
32	Agnieszka Szwarnóg	Poland (POL)	1:39:45
33	Hanna Drabenia	Belarus (BLR)	1:39:53
34	Laura Polli	Switzerland (SUI)	1:40:01
35	Mari Olsson	Sweden (SWE)	1:40:20
36	Anita Kažemāka	Latvia (LAT)	1:40:57
37	Edina Füsti	Hungary (HUN)	1:41:00
38	Anne Halkivaha	Finland (FIN)	1:41:01
39	Olena Shevchuk	Ukraine (UKR)	1:42:07
40	Paulina Buziak	Poland (POL)	1:42:19
41	Mária Czaková	Slovakia (SVK)	1:44:22
42	Viktória Madarász	Hungary (HUN)	1:45:02
43	Eszter Gerendási	Hungary (HUN)	1:47:27
44	Lisa Kehler	Great Britain (GBR)	1:47:58
45	Anita Cuhnova	Latvia (LAT)	1:55:39
46	Karolína Škrášková	Czech Republic (CZE)	2:02:19
—	Lorena Luaces	Spain (ESP)	DQ
—	Olive Loughnane	Ireland (IRL)	DQ
—	Claudia Ștef	Romania (ROU)	DQ
—	Alina Matveyuk	Belarus (BLR)	DNF
—	Agnese Pastare	Latvia (LAT)	DNF
—	Sonata Milušauskaitė	Lithuania (LTU)	DNF
—	Kristina Saltanovič	Lithuania (LTU)	DNF
—	Vera Santos	Portugal (POR)	DNF
—	Ana Veronica Rodean	Romania (ROU)	DNF

==== Team (20 km Women) ====
Place	Country	Points
1st place, gold medalist(s)	Russia	14 pts
2nd place, silver medalist(s)	Spain	22 pts
3rd place, bronze medalist(s)	Ukraine	32 pts
4	Portugal	37 pts
5	Italy	50 pts
6	Czech Republic	86 pts
7	Poland	88 pts
8	Hungary	122 pts

=== Women's 10 km Junior ===
Place	Athlete	Nation	Time
1st place, gold medalist(s)	Yelena Lashmanova	Russia (RUS)	43:10
2nd place, silver medalist(s)	Svetlana Vasilyeva	Russia (RUS)	44:02
3rd place, bronze medalist(s)	Kate Veale	Ireland (IRL)	46:32
4	Anna Clemente	Italy (ITA)	49:08
5	Federica Curiazzi	Italy (ITA)	49:14
6	Tuğçe Güneş	Turkey (TUR)	49:16
7	Anežka Drahotová	Czech Republic (CZE)	49:36
8	Olga Dubrovina	Russia (RUS)	49:36
9	Paula Martínez	Spain (ESP)	49:51
10	Halyna Yakovchuk	Ukraine (UKR)	50:01
11	Charlyne Czychy	Germany (GER)	50:39
12	Eliška Drahotová	Czech Republic (CZE)	50:58
13	Diana Kačanova	Lithuania (LTU)	51:06
14	Gamze Özgür	Turkey (TUR)	51:14
15	Sara Loparco	Italy (ITA)	51:19
16	Amandine Marcou	France (FRA)	51:27
17	Inès Pastorino	France (FRA)	51:44
18	Coralie Mellado	France (FRA)	51:48
19	Natalia Plomińska	Poland (POL)	52:08
20	Maeve Curley	Ireland (IRL)	52:37
21	Sandra Troyano	Spain (ESP)	52:37
22	Heather Lewis	Great Britain (GBR)	52:56
23	Amanda Cano	Spain (ESP)	53:06
24	Emma Prendiville	Ireland (IRL)	54:15
25	Lauren Whelan	Great Britain (GBR)	54:20
26	Erika Parviainen	Finland (FIN)	54:31
27	Tetyana Davydenko	Ukraine (UKR)	55:22
28	Sandra Monteiro	Portugal (POR)	56:42
—	Lyudmyla Olyanovska	Ukraine (UKR)	DNF

==== Team (10 km Junior Women) ====
Place	Country	Points
1st place, gold medalist(s)	Russia	3 pts
2nd place, silver medalist(s)	Italy	9 pts
3rd place, bronze medalist(s)	Czech Republic	19 pts
4	Turkey	20 pts
5	Ireland	23 pts
6	Spain	30 pts
7	France	33 pts
8	Ukraine	37 pts
9	United Kingdom	47 pts

== Participation ==
The participation of 218 athletes (134 men/84 women) from 25 countries is reported.

- Belarus (7)
- Czech Republic (6)
- Denmark (1)
- Estonia (3)
- Finland (8)
- France (13)
- Germany (7)
- Hungary (8)
- Ireland (10)
- Italy (18)
- Latvia (8)
- Lithuania (7)
- Norway (1)
- Poland (15)
- Portugal (14)
- Romania (4)
- Russia (18)
- Serbia (3)
- Slovakia (8)
- Spain (18)
- Sweden (5)
- Switzerland (3)
- Turkey (7)
- Ukraine (17)
- United Kingdom (10)
