= 2009 European Race Walking Cup =

- Organisers: EAA
- Edition: 8th
- Date: May 24
- Host city: Metz, Lorraine, France
- Events: 5
- Participation: 228 athletes from 26 nations

The eighth edition of the European Race Walking Cup took place in the French city of Metz on Sunday May 24, 2009.

Complete results were published. The junior events are documented on the World Junior Athletics History webpages. Medal winners were published on the Athletics Weekly website,

== Timetable ==
- All times are Central European Time (UTC+1)

Men's 50 km	08.00h
Men's 10 km Junior	09.00h
Women's 10 km Junior	10.00h
Women's 20 km	13.30h
Men's 20 km	15.30h

== Medallists ==
Event	Gold		Silver		Bronze	
Men
20 km	Giorgio Rubino (ITA)	1:24:06	Ivano Brugnetti (ITA)	1:24:54	Jean-Jacques Nkouloukidi (ITA)	1:25:07
50 km	Denis Nizhegorodov (RUS)	3:42:47	Jesús Ángel García (ESP)	3:46:27	Yuriy Andronov (RUS)	3:49:09
10 km Junior	Stanislav Yemelyanov (RUS)	41:22	Valeriy Filipchuk (RUS)	41:46	Veli-Matti Partanen (FIN)	41:55
Women
20 km	María Vasco (ESP)	1:32:53	Anisya Kirdyapkina (RUS)	1:33:28	Kristina Saltanovič (LTU)	1:34:17
10 km Junior	Tatyana Mineyeva (RUS)	44:16	Adriana Turnea (ROU)	46:32	Antonella Palmisano (ITA)	46:48
Team (Men)
20 km	Italy Giorgio Rubino; Ivano Brugnetti; Jean-Jacques Nkouloukidi	6 pts	Spain Juan Manuel Molina; Francisco Arcilla; Miguel Ángel López	30 pts	Poland Rafał Augustyn; Dawid Tomala; Rafał Sikora	40 pts
50 km	Russia Denis Nizhegorodov; Yury Andronov; Sergey Bakulin	8 pts	Spain Jesús Ángel García; Mikel Odriozola; José Cambil	13 pts	Italy Marco De Luca; Diego Cafagna; Fortunato D'Onofrio	38 pts
10 km Junior	Russia Stanislav Yemelyanov; Valery Filipchuk	3 pts	Poland Wojciech Halman; Tomasz Wiater	13 pts	Germany Hagen Pohle; Carl Dohmann	15 pts
Team (Women)
20 km	Russia Anisya Kirdyapkina; Larisa Safronova; Olena Shumkina	14 pts	Spain María Vascó; Beatriz Pascual; Julia Takács	18 pts	Slovakia Zuzana Malíková; Mária Gáliková; Mária Czaková	72 pts
10 km Junior	Italy Antonella Palmisano; Federica Curiazzi	10 pts	France Laurène Delon; Émilie Menuet	11 pts	Romania Adriana Turnea; Alexandra Gradinariu	12 pts

== Abbreviations ==
- All times shown are in hours:minutes:seconds

DNS	did not start
NM	no mark
WR	world record
WL	world leading
AR	area record
NR	national record
PB	personal best
SB	season best

== Men's results ==
=== 20 km walk ===
Rank	Athlete	Time	Note
1st place, gold medalist(s)	Giorgio Rubino (ITA)	1:24:06	
2nd place, silver medalist(s)	Ivano Brugnetti (ITA)	1:24:54	SB
3rd place, bronze medalist(s)	Jean-Jacques Nkouloukidi (ITA)	1:25:07	
4	Robert Heffernan (IRL)	1:25:21	SB
5	Pyotr Trofimov (RUS)	1:25:50	
6	Juan Manuel Molina (ESP)	1:25:58	
7	Rafał Augustyn (POL)	1:26:06	
8	Yohann Diniz (FRA)	1:26:59	SB
9	Matej Tóth (SVK)	1:27:29	
10	Jarkko Kinnunen (FIN)	1:27:43	
11	Francisco Arcilla (ESP)	1:28:24	
12	Matteo Giupponi (ITA)	1:28:47	
13	Miguel Ángel López (ESP)	1:29:23	
14	Ivan Losyev (UKR)	1:30:00	
15	Ruslan Dmytrenko (UKR)	1:30:50	
16	Dawid Tomala (POL)	1:30:56	
17	Rafal Sikora (POL)	1:31:00	
18	Antonin Boyez (FRA)	1:31:11	
19	Andrey Ruzavin (RUS)	1:31:28	SB
20	Pedro Isidro (POR)	1:31:54	
21	Bertrand Moulinet (FRA)	1:32:11	
22	Alexandros Papamihail (GRE)	1:33:31	
23	Antón Kucmín (SVK)	1:33:55	
24	Miloš Bátovský (SVK)	1:36:03	
25	Luke Finch (GBR)	1:36:31	
26	Milan Rízek (SVK)	1:36:39	
27	Andrey Krivov (RUS)	1:38:18	
28	Máté Helebrandt (HUN)	1:39:10	
29	Damien Molmy (FRA)	1:39:57	
30	Oleksandr Romanenko (UKR)	1:41:33	
31	Dragoș Neacșu (ROU)	1:42:37	
32	Jacques van Bremen (NED)	1:43:06	
33	Karel Ketner (CZE)	1:46:03	PB
DID NOT FINISH (DNF)
—	Andriy Kovenko (UKR)	DNF	
—	Recep Çelik (TUR)	DNF	
—	Aleksandr Yargunkin (RUS)	DNF	
—	Sérgio Vieira (POR)	DNF	
—	João Vieira (POR)	DNF	
—	António Pereira (POR)	DNF	
—	Benjamin Kucinski (POL)	DNF	
—	Trond Nymark (NOR)	DNF	
—	Tautvydas Žekas (LTU)	DNF	
—	Vilius Mikelionis (LTU)	DNF	
—	Tadas Šuškevičius (LTU)	DNF	
—	Jamie Costin (IRL)	DNF	
—	Theodoros Kefalopoulos (GRE)	DNF	
—	Carsten Schmidt (GER)	DNF	
—	Benjamín Sánchez (ESP)	DNF	
—	Vitaly Talankou (BLR)	DNF	
—	Andrei Talashka (BLR)	DNF	
—	Olivier Colette (BEL)	DNF	
DISQUALIFIED (DSQ)
—	Ato Ibáñez (SWE)	DSQ	
—	Colin Griffin (IRL)	DSQ	
—	André Höhne (GER)	DSQ	
—	Lauri Lelumees (EST)	DSQ	
—	Ivan Trotski (BLR)	DSQ	

==== Team (20 km Men) ====
Place	Country	Points
1st place, gold medalist(s)	Italy	6 pts
2nd place, silver medalist(s)	Spain	30 pts
3rd place, bronze medalist(s)	Poland	40 pts
4	France	47 pts
5	Russia	51 pts
6	Slovakia	56 pts
7	Ukraine	59 pts

=== 50 km walk ===
Rank	Athlete	Time	Note
1st place, gold medalist(s)	Denis Nizhegorodov (RUS)	3:42:47	SB
2nd place, silver medalist(s)	Jesús Ángel García (ESP)	3:46:27	SB
3rd place, bronze medalist(s)	Yuriy Andronov (RUS)	3:49:09	SB
4	Sergey Bakulin (RUS)	3:52:38	PB
5	Mikel Odriozola (ESP)	3:53:13	SB
6	José Alejandro Cambil (ESP)	3:53:31	SB
7	Donatas Škarnulis (LTU)	3:53:43	SB
8	Marco De Luca (ITA)	3:54:35	SB
9	Oleksiy Shelest (UKR)	3:55:19	SB
10	Augusto Cardoso (POR)	4:01:13	SB
11	Diego Cafagna (ITA)	4:01:47	SB
12	Konstadinos Stefanopoulos (GRE)	4:03:12	PB
13	Jorge Costa (POR)	4:04:10	SB
14	Eddy Riva (FRA)	4:04:46	SB
15	Dionísio Ventura (POR)	4:05:51	SB
16	Santiago Pérez (ESP)	4:08:17	
17	Hervé Davaux (FRA)	4:10:13	SB
18	Vasilios Hrisikos (GRE)	4:11:30	PB
19	Fortunato D'Onofrio (ITA)	4:12:27	PB
20	Vjaceslavs Grigorjevs (LAT)	4:21:50	SB
21	Cédric Houssaye (FRA)	4:27:16	SB
22	László Novák (HUN)	4:38:56	
23	Róbert Tubak (HUN)	4:45:47	
24	Gyula Dudás (HUN)	4:53:58	
DID NOT FINISH (DNF)
—	Serhiy Budza (UKR)	DNF	
—	Oleksiy Kazanin (UKR)	DNF	
—	Andreas Gustafsson (SWE)	DNF	
—	Bruno Grandjean (SUI)	DNF	
—	Sergey Kirdyapkin (RUS)	DNF	
—	Pedro Martins (POR)	DNF	
—	Artur Brzozowski (POL)	DNF	
—	Arnis Rumbenieks (LAT)	DNF	
—	Ingus Janevics (LAT)	DNF	
—	Dario Privitera (ITA)	DNF	
—	Sébastien Biche (FRA)	DNF	
—	Andrei Stepanchuk (BLR)	DNF	
DISQUALIFIED (DSQ)
—	Taras Kozlyuk (UKR)	DSQ	
—	Zoltán Czukor (HUN)	DSQ	
—	Maik Berger (GER)	DSQ	
—	Dan King (GBR)	DSQ	
—	Dominic King (GBR)	DSQ	

==== Team (50 km Men) ====
Place	Country	Points
1st place, gold medalist(s)	Russia	8 pts
2nd place, silver medalist(s)	Spain	13 pts
3rd place, bronze medalist(s)	Italy	38 pts
4	Portugal	38 pts
5	France	52 pts
6	Hungary	69 pts

=== Junior 10 km walk ===
Rank	Athlete	Time	Note
1st place, gold medalist(s)	Stanislav Yemelyanov (RUS)	41:22	
2nd place, silver medalist(s)	Valeriy Filipchuk (RUS)	41:46	
3rd place, bronze medalist(s)	Veli-Matti Partanen (FIN)	41:55	SB
4	Hagen Pohle (GER)	42:25	
5	Wojciech Halman (POL)	42:29	
6	Vito Di Bari (ITA)	42:35	
7	Ihor Lyashchenko (UKR)	42:50	
8	Tomasz Wiater (POL)	43:00	
9	Riccardo Macchia (ITA)	43:13	
10	Denis Strelkov (RUS)	43:29	
11	Carl Dohmann (GER)	43:32	
12	Adrian Błocki (POL)	43:58	
13	Luís Alberto Amezcua (ESP)	44:11	
14	Genadij Kozlovskij (LTU)	44:28	
15	Viktor Holubnychyy (UKR)	44:33	
16	Luís Lopes (POR)	44:51	
17	Dzmitry Dziubin (BLR)	44:53	
18	Yuriy Loktionov (UKR)	45:00	
19	Aleh Sauchanka (BLR)	45:19	
20	Perseus Karlström (SWE)	45:28	
21	Pavel Schrom (CZE)	45:33	
22	Victor Paloma (ESP)	45:57	
23	Lukáš Gdula (CZE)	45:59	
24	Mark O'Kane (GBR)	46:04	
25	Mael Boulch (FRA)	46:10	
26	Francisco Yuste (ESP)	46:11	
27	Mert Atli (TUR)	46:12	
28	Gerard Chmyznikov (LTU)	47:18	
29	Roman Říha (CZE)	47:27	
30	Dénes Papp (HUN)	47:49	
31	Hugo Andrieu (FRA)	47:56	
32	Ainar Veskus (EST)	48:00	
33	Axel Gaborit (FRA)	48:22	
34	Iiro Lehtoranta (FIN)	48:33	
35	Máté Lalik (HUN)	48:42	
36	Anders Hansson (SWE)	49:51	
37	Niall Prendiville (IRL)	50:27	
38	Viktor Markus (HUN)	50:55	
39	Tom Bosworth (GBR)	52:01	
—	Ben Wears (GBR)	DSQ	
—	Vincenzo Taliano (ITA)	DSQ	
—	Håvard Haukenes (NOR)	DSQ	
—	Kemal Gelecek (TUR)	DSQ	

==== Team (10 km Junior Men) ====
Place	Country	Points
1st place, gold medalist(s)	Russia	3 pts
2nd place, silver medalist(s)	Poland	13 pts
3rd place, bronze medalist(s)	Germany	15 pts
4	Italy	15 pts
5	Ukraine	22 pts
6	Spain	35 pts
7	Belarus	36 pts
8	Finland	37 pts
9	Lithuania	42 pts
10	Czech Republic	44 pts
11	France	56 pts
12	Sweden	57 pts
13	United Kingdom	63 pts
14	Hungary	65 pts

== Women's results ==
=== 20 km walk ===
Rank	Athlete	Time	Note
1st place, gold medalist(s)	María Vasco (ESP)	1:32:53	SB
2nd place, silver medalist(s)	Anisya Kirdyapkina (RUS)	1:33:28	
3rd place, bronze medalist(s)	Kristina Saltanovic (LTU)	1:34:17	
4	Olive Loughnane (IRL)	1:34:52	SB
5	Larisa Yemelyanova (RUS)	1:35:16	
6	Beatriz Pascual (ESP)	1:35:28	
7	Yelena Shumkina (RUS)	1:35:51	
8	Sniazhana Yurchanka (BLR)	1:36:14	
9	Evaggelia Xinou (GRE)	1:36:39	
10	Vera Sokolova (RUS)	1:36:43	
11	Julia Takács (ESP)	1:37:01	
12	Katarzyna Kwoka (POL)	1:37:36	
13	Ana Cabecinha (POR)	1:38:01	
14	Marie Polli (SUI)	1:39:02	
15	Claudia Stef (ROU)	1:39:10	
16	Paulina Buziak (POL)	1:39:23	
17	Rocío Florido (ESP)	1:39:40	
18	Zuzana Malíková (SVK)	1:39:42	
19	Karoliina Kaasalainen (FIN)	1:39:48	PB
20	Brigita Virbalyte (LTU)	1:40:41	
21	Zuzana Schindlerová (CZE)	1:40:48	
22	Nadiya Borovska (UKR)	1:41:15	
23	Mária Gáliková (SVK)	1:41:54	
24	Hanna Drabenia (BLR)	1:42:40	
25	Ana Veronica Rodean (ROU)	1:44:17	
26	Vira Zozulya (UKR)	1:44:47	
27	Jo Jackson (GBR)	1:45:05	
28	Lucie Pelantová (CZE)	1:45:52	
29	Laura Polli (SUI)	1:46:58	
30	Anne-Gaëlle Retout (FRA)	1:47:42	
31	Mária Czaková (SVK)	1:48:52	
32	Laura Reynolds (IRL)	1:49:24	SB
33	Katalin Varró (HUN)	1:50:37	
34	Fabienne Chanfreau (FRA)	1:50:44	
35	Andrea Kovács (HUN)	1:52:04	
36	Eszter Gerendási (HUN)	1:54:08	SB
37	Olha Yakovenko (UKR)	1:55:27	
38	Krisztina Kernács (HUN)	1:56:33	
39	Sandra Mitrovic (FRA)	1:58:58	
40	Corinne Henchoz (SUI)	2:04:47	SB
DID NOT FINISH (DNF)
—	Nastassia Yatsevich (BLR)	DNF	
—	Sabine Krantz (GER)	DNF	
—	Maria Hatzipanayiotidou (GRE)	DNF	
—	Sonata Milušauskaitė (LTU)	DNF	
—	Neringa Aidietyte (LTU)	DNF	
—	Agnieszka Dygacz (POL)	DNF	
—	Katarzyna Golba (POL)	DNF	
—	Susana Feitor (POR)	DNF	
—	Anamaria Greceanu (ROU)	DNF	
—	Lyudmyla Shelest (UKR)	DNF	
DISQUALIFIED (DSQ)
—	Zhanna Halaunia (BLR)	DSQ	
—	Inês Henriques (POR)	DSQ	
—	Vera Santos (POR)	DSQ	
—	Ana Maria Groza (ROU)	DSQ	

==== Team (20 km Women) ====
Place	Country	Points
1st place, gold medalist(s)	Russia	14 pts
2nd place, silver medalist(s)	Spain	18 pts
3rd place, bronze medalist(s)	Slovakia	72 pts
4	Switzerland	83 pts
5	Ukraine	85 pts
6	France	103 pts
7	Hungary	104 pts

=== Junior 10 km walk ===
- U-20 competition; only top three listed

Rank	Athlete	Time	Note
1st place, gold medalist(s)	Tatyana Mineyeva (RUS)	44:16	
2nd place, silver medalist(s)	Adriana Turnea (ROU)	46:32	
3rd place, bronze medalist(s)	Antonella Palmisano (ITA)	46:48	PB
4	Panayióta Tsinopoúlou (GRE)	48:25	
5	Laurène Delon (FRA)	48:37	
6	Emilie Menuet (FRA)	48:45	
7	Federica Curiazzi (ITA)	48:48	
8	Anita Kažemāka (LAT)	49:00	
9	Sara Alonso (ESP)	49:24	
10	Alexandra Gradinariu (ROU)	49:30	
11	Berta Kriván (HUN)	50:12	
12	Anna Mielcarek (POL)	50:22	
13	Sandra Yerga (ESP)	50:55	
14	Nadzeya Darazhuk (BLR)	51:06	
15	Magdalena Jasińska (POL)	51:21	
16	Kateryna Svitko (UKR)	51:36	
17	Paula Martínez (ESP)	51:39	
18	Charlyne Czychy (GER)	53:03	
19	Halyna Yakovchuk (UKR)	53:10	
20	Mikaela Löfbacka (FIN)	53:13	
21	Claudia Bussu (ITA)	53:32	
22	Elif Koç (TUR)	53:43	
23	Marie Onno (FRA)	54:39	
24	Fiona Dennehy (IRL)	55:11	
25	Nikoletta Lada (GRE)	55:15	
26	Agnė Klebauskaitė (LTU)	55:35	
27	Emma Doherty (IRL)	55:54	
28	Emma Prendiville (IRL)	57:13	
29	Hulya Taser (TUR)	59:52	
—	Alina Matveyuk (BLR)	DSQ	
—	Tatyana Kalmykova (RUS)	DSQ	
—	Kseniya Trifonova (RUS)	DSQ	
—	Anna Chernenko (UKR)	DSQ	

==== Team (10 km Junior Women) ====
Place	Country	Points
1st place, gold medalist(s)	Italy	10 pts
2nd place, silver medalist(s)	France	11 pts
3rd place, bronze medalist(s)	Romania	12 pts
4	Spain	22 pts
5	Poland	27 pts
6	Greece	29 pts
7	Ukraine	35 pts
8	Turkey	51 pts
9	Ireland	51 pts

== Participation ==
The participation of 228 athletes (140 men/88 women) from 26 countries is reported.

- Belarus (12)
- Belgium (1)
- Czech Republic (6)
- Estonia (2)
- Finland (5)
- France (17)
- Germany (7)
- Greece (8)
- Hungary (13)
- Ireland (9)
- Italy (14)
- Latvia (5)
- Lithuania (11)
- Netherlands (1)
- Norway (2)
- Poland (14)
- Portugal (13)
- Romania (7)
- Russia (18)
- Slovakia (7)
- Spain (18)
- Sweden (4)
- Switzerland (4)
- Turkey (5)
- Ukraine (18)
- United Kingdom (7)
