= Viktor Chegin =

Russian racewalking coach (born 1962)

Viktor Mikhailovich Chegin (Russian: Виктор Михайлович Чёгин; born 3 February 1962 in Bersenevka, Lyambirsky District) is a banned Russian racewalking coach. He was responsible for training all three athletes who swept the medals at the 2009 World Championships in Athletics: Olga Kaniskina, Valeriy Borchin and Sergey Kirdyapkin. His athletes Elena Lashmanova and Sergey Kirdyapkin won gold medals at the 2012 Summer Olympics, with Kaniskina earning a silver medal. Former and banned world record holders Lashmanova, Denis Nizhegorodov and Sergey Morozov are all coached by Chegin.

More than 20 of Chegin's trainees were disqualified for doping-related offenses between 2005 and 2015. As a result, he was banned for life from all sport-related activities on 17 February 2016. Historical results by Chegin-coached athletes continued to be disqualified into mid-2019.

== Biography ==
On 16 July 2014, Chegin was fired from the Russian team amid an investigation by the Russian Anti Doping Agency (RUSADA). Sovetsky Sport quoted Valentin Balakhnichev, head of the All-Russia Athletic Federation saying Chegin would not be part of the team for the European championship, as the recent doping scandals had “tarnished Chegin’s career” but said the coach would continue to train athletes in Russia.

While not part of the official delegation, Chegin was spotted in August 2014 in Zurich along the course of the 2014 European Athletics Championships coaching his athletes after the ban was in place.

Banned for life in December 2012, after a second doping violation, Morozov continued to work with Chegin as an accredited Russian staff member at the 2014 IAAF World Race Walking Cup.

Chegin coaches at the Centre of the Olympic training of Mordovia in Saransk, where he has been highly honored as "the father of all the victories of our race walkers." He was named a "Chevalier of the Order of Glory of Mordovia"

As early as 2008, there were accusations of systematic doping violations on the part of Chegin. Several other athletes have skipped major championships, which have raised suspicions of doping and avoidance of Drug Testing.

Several of Chegin's suspended athletes, including Sergey Bakulin, Elena Lashmanova and Ekaterina Medvedeva apparently competed in a race on 30 December 2014 according to photographs collected by Canadian race walker Evan Dunfee. Russian officials claim the photographs are from a 2012 event and released additional photographs which show different athletes on the awards stands, although it was not possible to be from 2012 as the running shoes used were not released by Asics until after 2012.

On 15 July 2015 Chegin was suspended by the Russian athletics federation. Prior to that date, Chegin had been allowed to coach. The day before, IAAF ratified a new world record in the 20 km walk by Liu Hong. Two record breaking performances, months earlier, by Chegin coached Olimpiada Ivanova and Olga Kaniskina were not taken into account, because insufficient number of judges were present to fix them. In the year since Balakhnichev cleared Chegin to continuing coaching, Balakhnichev resigned his positions with the All-Russia Athletic Federation and as Treasurer of the IAAF in light of the scandal. His replacement, Vadim Zelichenok, said “Athletes will not be allowed to work with Chegin, or otherwise they come under sanctions.”

On 9 November 2015, an investigative report by the World Anti-Doping Agency recommended that Chegin be given a lifetime ban from sport, due to involvement in a wide-ranging Russian doping scheme in track and field. The ban was issued by RUSADA on 17 February 2016.

Despite his ban, Chegin never ceased coaching his athletes and continued to do so even amid the outcry in the West.

== Athletes coached by Chegin and banned for doping offenses ==
37 athletes in total had by January 2015 been banned by IAAF in biological passport cases. Eleven of them, or ca. 30%, were coached by Viktor Chegin. There are also at least 6 EPO positives recorded by his athletes, two positives for the possible cancer causing black market drug GW1516, and in 2014 two of his athletes tested positive for SARMs. Three of his athletes have been banned for life, all for their second anti-doping rule violation, and all before the age of 30. Also, one of his athletes, German Skurygin, died of a heart attack at age 45.

- Tatyana Akulinushkina – 6-month ban for a Fenoterol positive in 2013 + 4-year ban for Furosemide positive in 2015.
- Elmira Alembekova – 2014 European Gold Medalist, suspended in secrecy in June 2015, finally revealed in September 2015
- Yuriy Andronov – 2 time World Cup bronze medalist – 2-year ban for a Trimetazidine positive in 2014.
- Sergey Bakulin – 2011 World Champion – 3 years and 2 months ban for anomalies in his biological passport.
- Pyotr Bogatyrev – Bronze medalist at the World Junior Championships – 2-year ban for anomalies in his biological passport.
- Valeriy Borchin – Olympic and 2X world champion, collapsed 1 km before the finish in 2012 Olympics – 8-year ban for anomalies in his biological passport.
- Viktor Burayev – European Race Walking Cup – 2-year ban for an EPO positive in 2008.
- Dementiy Cheparev – Silver medalist at the 2009 IAAF World Youth Championships – 2-year ban for a Fenoterol positive in 2012.
- Evgenia Danilova – 2-year ban for a GW1516 positive in 2013.
- Stanislav Emelyanov – 2007 World Youth champion, 2008 World Junior champion and 2009 European Junior champion – 2-year ban for anomalies in his biological passport Caught for a second violation in June 2015. Banned for life in March 2018.
- Igor Erokhin – Silver medalist from the 2011 European Race Walking Cup – 2-year ban for an EPO positive in 2008 and banned for life in 2013 for anomalies in his biological passport.
- Artur Grigoryev – 2-year ban for a Carphedon positive in 2013.
- Olimpiada Ivanova – Olympic silver medalist and 2X world champion – 2-year ban for a stanozolol positive in 1997.
- Vladimir Kanaykin – World Championships silver medalist, World Junior Champion – 2-year ban for an EPO positive in 2008 and banned for life in 2015 for biological passport anomalies.
- Olga Kaniskina – Olympic Gold and Silver medalist – Banned for 3 years and 2 months in 2015 for biological passport anomalies.
- Anisya Kirdyapkina - in February 2019, banned for three years for doping and all her results from 25 February 2011 to 11 October were disqualified including her 2 Universiade gold medals, 2 World Championship silver medals and her 2012 Olympics 5th place.
- Sergey Kirdyapkin – 2012 Olympic Gold Medalist, Banned for 3 years and 2 months in 2015 for biological passport anomalies.
- Elena Lashmanova – Olympic and World Champion, World Record – Banned for 2 years for a GW1516 positive in 2014.
- Mikhail Lemaev – Marathon runner – Banned for 2 years in 2013 for biological passport anomalies.
- Ekaterina Medvedeva – World Junior Champion – Banned for 2 years in 2013 for an EPO positive.
- Tatyana Mineyeva – World Junior Champion – Banned for 2 years in 2012 for biological passport anomalies.
- Nadezhda Mokeyeva – Banned for 2 years in 2014 for a SARMs positive.
- Sergey Morozov – World Youth Champion – Banned for 2 years for an EPO positive in 2008 and banned for life in 2012 (at the age of 24) for biological passport anomalies.
- Ivan Noskov – 2014 World Cup Silver medalist, suspended in secrecy in June 2015, finally revealed in September 2015
- Evgeniy Pantyushin – banned in October 2014
- Andrey Ruzavin – Bronze medalist at the 2014 IAAF World Race Walking Cup. Provisionally suspended in October 2014, and handed a 30-month doping ban in March 2015 for Biological passport anomalies.
- Mikhail Ryzhov World Championship Silver Medalist, suspended in secrecy in June 2015, finally revealed in September 2015
- German Skurygin – World and European Champion – Banned for 2 years in 1999 for a human chorionic gonadotrophin positive. died of a heart attack at 45
- Vera Sokolova – World Cup gold medalist, suspended in secrecy in June 2015, finally revealed in September 2015
- Denis Strelkov – 2014 European bronze medalist, suspended in secrecy in June 2015, finally revealed in September 2015
- Aleksey Voyevodin – World Cup Champion – Banned for 2 years in 2008 for an EPO positive.
- Irina Yumanova – Banned for 2 years in 2014 for a SARMs positive.

== Other athletes coached by Chegin ==
- Aleksandr Ivanov
- Vera Nacharkina
- Denis Nizhegorodov
- Vladimir Porvatkin
- Tatyana Shemyakina
- Irina Stankina
