= Andrey Ruzavin =

Russian racewalker (born 1986)

Medal record

Men's athletics

Representing Russia

Universiade
Silver medal – second place	2009 Belgrade	20 km walk

IAAF World Race Walking Cup
Bronze medal – third place	2014 Taicang	20 km walk

Andrey Viktorovich Ruzavin (Russian: Андрея Викторович Рузавин; born 28 March 1986) is a Russian racewalking athlete who competes over the 20 kilometres race walk distance. He has a personal best of 1:17:47 hours for the distance, which ranks him in the top twenty of all time. Ruzavin was the silver medallist in the 20 km walk at the 2009 Summer Universiade and a bronze medallist at the 2014 IAAF World Race Walking Cup.

He is a three-time participant at the Universiade (2009, 2011 and 2013) and a four-time entrant at the IAAF World Race Walking Cup (2004, 2010, 2012, 2014). He represented his country at the 2013 World Championships in Athletics. He was the gold medallist in the 10,000 m walk at the 2004 World Junior Championships in Athletics and the 2005 European Athletics Junior Championships. He has won three national titles: two summer and one winter 20 km title.

Ruzavin was suspended for doping in 2014 and in March 2015 he was handed a 30-month doping ban for abnormalities in his biological passport.

== Career ==
=== Junior career ===
Born in Mordovia, Ruzavin attended Mordovian State University. He began competing in racewalking events as a teenager He made his international debut in the junior 10 km walk at the 2004 IAAF World Race Walking Cup, finishing in sixth place. He shared the team silver medals with Russian team mate Aleksandr Prokhorov.

His first individual medal followed at the 2004 World Junior Championships in Athletics, where he edged compatriot Vladimir Kanaykin to win the 10,000 m track walk title. A gold medal double came the year after: he was the junior champion in the 10 km road distance at the 2005 European Race Walking Cup before going on to win at the 2005 European Athletics Junior Championships in a championship record time of 39:28.45 minutes.

=== First senior competitions ===
Ruzavin began to make an impact at senior level in 2006, placing fourth at the Russian Race Walking Championships. His first senior call-up came at the 2007 European Race Walking Cup, where he ranked 34th overall. At the 2008 national championships he competed over the novel 35 km distance and managed third place in a race won by world record holder Vladimir Kanaykin. Stepping up in distance, he entered the 50 kilometres race walk for the 2008 IAAF World Race Walking Cup, but did not perform well and failed to finish the competition. His performances over 20 km began to improve at the 2009 European Race Walking Cup, where he ranked 19th. He also edged up in the national rankings, coming second to Andrey Krivov in the 20 km event. He received his first senior medal at the 2009 Universiade, forming a Russian 1–2 with champion Sergey Bakulin. A senior title came at the end-of-season IAAF Race Walking Challenge Final, where he was victorious over the shorter 10 km distance ahead of both Stanislav Emelyanov and Eder Sánchez.

He came 38th at the 2010 IAAF World Race Walking Cup 20 km race. In 2010 he ranked within the top four nationally at both the winter and summer championships and repeated that feat the year after. He was less successful at international level, failing to finish the 50 km distance at the 2011 European Race Walking Cup and managing only 17th in the 20 km race at the 2011 Universiade. Working under coach Viktor Chegin, his form turned around in the 2012 season as he opened with a personal best of 1:17:45 hours to win the 20 km title at the Russian Winter Walking Championships. He was beaten by training mate Sergey Morozov at the summer championships (although Morozov was banned for life from the sport for doping later that year). He gave his best performance of his career at that point at the 2012 IAAF World Race Walking Cup, finishing in fifth after Morozov's subsequent disqualification.

=== Global competition and medal ===
At the 2013 Russian winter championships Ruzavin was second to Pyotr Trofimov, but gained selection for the 2013 European Race Walking Cup and shared in the team title with winner Denis Strelkov and Aleksandr Ivanov. He was the winner at the summer Russian championships ahead of stable-mate Petr Bogatyrev in a time of 1:19:08 hours. He led from the start at the 2013 Universiade, held in Kazan, but fell back to fourth place while fellow Russian Andrey Krivov won the title. Ruzavin gained selection for the 2013 World Championships in Athletics hosted by Moscow – his first major global championships – but despite being among the favoured entrants he could not match his earlier form and was well down the field in 49th place, nearly twelve minutes behind gold medallist Aleksandr Ivanov.

Ruzavin raised himself into fifth on the all-time rankings for the infrequently held 5000 m indoor walk, recording a time of 18:15.54 minutes at the Samara Cup. A fourth-place finish at the Russian Winter Walking Championships earned him another international selection for the 2014 IAAF World Race Walking Cup and had his second fastest 20 km finishing time at the point with 1:18:59 hours – this brought him the bronze medal, although poor performances by his compatriots (Ivanov was disqualified and Trofimov was next best in 17th) meant he did not secure a team medal.

Ruzavin was suspended from competition by RUSADA (the Russian anti-doping agency) in October 2014 due to abnormalities in his biological passport. His suspension marked a continuation of a series of doping bans emerging from Viktor Chegin's Mordovia walking school, the most prominent being Olympic champion and world record breaker Elena Lashmanova.

== Personal bests ==
- 10,000 metres walk – 38:43.03 min (2006)
- 10 kilometres walk – 38:17 min (2009)
- 20 kilometres walk – 1:17:47 hrs (2012)
- 35 kilometres walk – 2:28:17 hrs (2011)
- 5000 metres indoor walk – 18:15.54 min (2014)

== National titles ==
- Russian Race Walking Championships
  - 20 km walk: 2012, 2013
- Russian Winter Race Walking Championships
  - 20 km walk: 2012

== International competitions ==
Year	Competition	Venue	Position	Event	Notes
Representing Russia
2004	IAAF World Race Walking Cup	Naumburg, Germany	6th	10 km junior walk	41:53
2004	World Junior Championships	Grosseto, Italy	1st	10,000 m walk	40:58.15
2005	European Race Walking Cup	Miskolc, Hungary	1st	10 km junior walk	39:57
2005	European Junior Championships	Kaunas, Lithuania	1st	10,000 m walk	39:28.45
2007	European Race Walking Cup	Royal Leamington Spa, United Kingdom	34th	20 km walk	1:26:23
2008	IAAF World Race Walking Cup	Cheboksary, Russia	–	50 km walk	DNF
2009	European Race Walking Cup	Metz, France	19th	20 km walk	1:31:28
2009	Universiade	Belgrade, Serbia	2nd	20 km walk	1:21:08
2009	IAAF Race Walking Challenge Final	Saransk, Russia	1st	10 km walk	38:17
2010	IAAF World Race Walking Cup	Chihuahua City, Mexico	37th	20 km walk	1:29:22
2011	European Race Walking Cup	Olhão, Portugal	–	50 km walk	DNF
2011	Universiade	Shenzhen, China	17th	20 km walk	1:30:38
2012	IAAF World Race Walking Cup	Saransk, Russia	5th	20 km walk	1:20:37
2013	European Race Walking Cup	Dudince, Slovakia	15th	20 km	1:24:11
2013	European Race Walking Cup	Dudince, Slovakia	1st	Team - 20 km	20 pts
2013	Universiade	Kazan, Russia	4th	20 km walk	1:22:12
2013	World Championships	Moscow, Russia	49th	20 km walk	1:32:45
2014	World Race Walking Cup	Taicang, China	3rd	20 km walk	1:18:59

== See also ==
- List of doping cases in athletics
