= 2007 European Athletics U23 Championships – Men's 20 kilometres walk =

The men's 20 kilometres race walk event at the 2007 European Athletics U23 Championships was held in Debrecen, Hungary, on 14 July.

== Medalists ==
Gold	Valeriy Borchin; Russia
Silver	Andrey Krivov; Russia
Bronze	Sergey Bakulin; Russia

== Results ==
=== Final ===
14 July

Rank	Name	Nationality	Time	Notes
1st place, gold medalist(s)	Valeriy Borchin	Russia	1:20:43	
2nd place, silver medalist(s)	Andrey Krivov	Russia	1:21:51	
3rd place, bronze medalist(s)	Sergey Bakulin	Russia	1:23:33	
4	Ingus Janevičs	Latvia	1:23:37	
5	Michael Krause	Germany	1:24:54	
6	Ruslan Dmytrenko	Ukraine	1:26:25	
7	Hannes Tonat	Germany	1:27:24	
8	Jakub Jelonek	Poland	1:28:06	
9	Marius Žiūkas	Lithuania	1:28:35	
10	Aliaksandr Kazakou	Belarus	1:28:52	
11	Ivan Losyev	Ukraine	1:31:13	
12	Vilius Mikelionis	Lithuania	1:32:24	
13	Sándor Rácz	Hungary	1:35:21	
	Michal Blažek	Slovakia	DNF	
	Benjamín Sánchez	Spain	DNF	
	Carsten Schmidt	Germany	DNF	
	Tadas Šuškevičius	Lithuania	DQ	
	Dzianis Simanovich	Belarus	DQ	
	Ato Ibáñez	Sweden	DQ	
	Artur Brzozowski	Poland	DQ	
	Giorgio Rubino	Italy	DQ	

== Participation ==
According to an unofficial count, 21 athletes from 12 countries participated in the event.

- Belarus (2)
- Germany (3)
- Hungary (1)
- Italy (1)
- Latvia (1)
- Lithuania (3)
- Poland (2)
- Russia (3)
- Slovakia (1)
- Spain (1)
- Sweden (1)
- Ukraine (2)
