= Evan Dunfee =

Canadian race walker

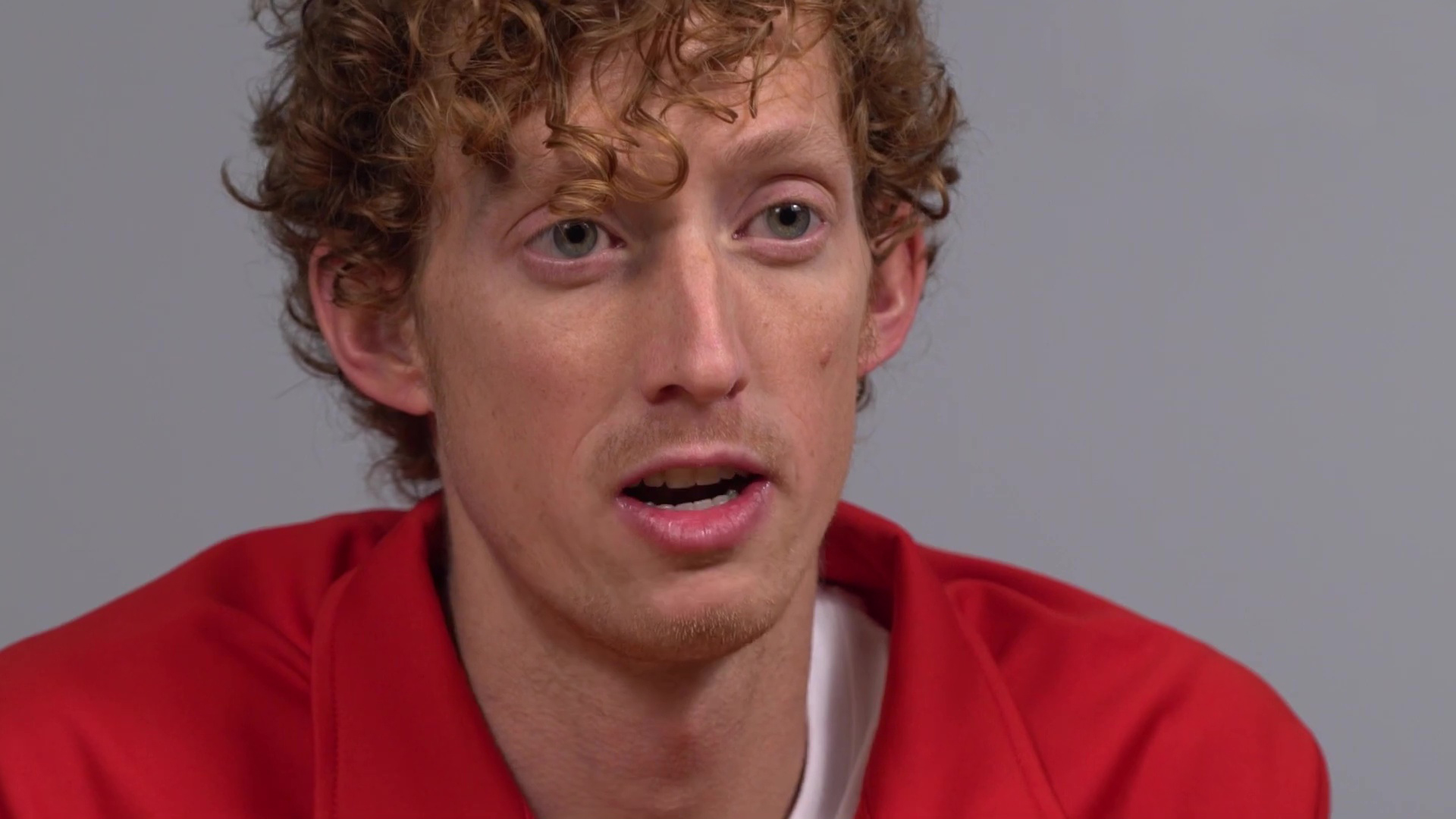
- Dunfee in 2021

Personal information
- Nationality: Canadian
- Born: September 28, 1990 (age 36) Richmond, British Columbia, Canada
- Height: 1.86 m (6 ft 1 in)
- Weight: 67 kg (148 lb)

Sport
- Country: Canada
- Sport: Athletics
- Event: Race walking
Medal record
Men's race walking
Representing Canada
Olympic Games
Bronze medal – third place	2020 Tokyo	50 km walk
World Championships
Gold medal – first place	2025 Tokyo	35 km walk
Bronze medal – third place	2019 Doha	50 km walk
World Race Walking Team Championships
Silver medal – second place	2016 Rome	20 km
Commonwealth Games
Gold medal – first place	2022 Birmingham	10 km walk
Bronze medal – third place	2026 Glasgow	10000 m walk
Pan American Games
Gold medal – first place	2015 Toronto	20 km walk
North American, Central American and Caribbean Championships
Gold medal – first place	2018 Toronto	20 km
Silver medal – second place	2022 Freeport	20 km
Jeux de la Francophonie
Silver medal – second place	2013 Nice	20 km
Summer Universiade
Bronze medal – third place	2013 Kazan	20 km (team)

Evan Dunfee (born September 28, 1990) is a Canadian race walker. An Olympic and World medallist, Dunfee first set the Canadian record in the 50 kilometres race walk (at 3:41:38) at the 2016 Summer Olympics, where he placed fourth. He went on to win bronze medals at the 2019 World Athletics Championships and the 2020 Summer Olympics, which was the last time both of those competitions held the 50 km as an event. He is the reigning world champion in 35 kilometres, having won the gold medal at the 2025 World Championships.

== Career ==
He competed for his national team in the 50K walk at the 2013 World Championships, finishing in under 4 hours at 3:59:28. He won a bronze medal with his team at the 2013 World University Games where two of the winning Russian race walkers, Denis Strelkov and Andrey Ruzavin have since been suspended for doping violations. Dunfee is the 2012 champion and record holder for the 20 km walk at the NACAC Under-23 Championships in Athletics. He was the silver medalist at the Athletics at the 2013 Jeux de la Francophonie. He has several near misses finishing fourth at the 2009 Pan American Race Walking Cup, the 2013 Pan American Race Walking Cup, 2015 Pan American Race Walking Cup and the 2012 Oceania Race Walking Championships and sixth at the 2010 Commonwealth Games usually very close to teammate and training partner Iñaki Gomez.

Dunfee grew up in Richmond, British Columbia, where he attended Kingswood Elementary and Matthew McNair Secondary School. He graduated from the University of British Columbia in 2014 with a bachelor's degree in kinesiology. Dunfee was a digital contributor to Canadian Running Magazine. His investigative work on illegal doping-related activities by Russian competitors has been quoted by the Associated Press and Inside the Games. Additionally, he is a KidSport ambassador. In 2018, in support of KidSport's 25th anniversary, he raised funds and walked 25 km a day for 25 days.

In July 2016, he was named to Canada's Olympic team for the 2016 Rio Olympics. In the 50-kilometre race walk, Hirooki Arai of Japan initially finished third. He was then disqualified for making contact with Dunfee, but Arai's medal was reinstated after a Japanese appeal led to overturning the disqualification. Dunfee advised the Canadian team against making a further appeal. Dunfee set a new Canadian record in the event. He also competed in the 20-kilometre race walk, placing tenth.

After dealing with injuries, Dunfee took some time out from the sport in 2018 before beginning what he termed a restart with new goals. His work with KidSport to raise money for charity was part of an attempt to give him "a different avenue to chase [his] competitive spirit," and he credited it with reinvigorating him heading into the 2019 season. Competing at the 2019 World Athletics Championships in Doha, Dunfee won the bronze medal, the second medal for a Canadian in racewalk at the World Championships, and the first in the 50 km. This was the last time the 50 km was contested at the World Championships, a decision Dunfee indicated he disagreed with. He went on to say that his full focus was on preparing for the next Olympics.

Due to the COVID-19 pandemic, the 2020 Summer Olympics in Tokyo were delayed by a year. As in Doha, this was the last time the 50 kilometres race walk was to be a featured event at the Olympics. In the closing metres of the race, Dunfee surged into third place and won the bronze medal, becoming the third-ever Canadian racewalking Olympic medalist and the only one in the 50 km event. He said, "I don't need a medal to validate myself. I'm proud of what I accomplished today, but I have been dreaming of this moment and winning this medal for 21 years. I am over the moon." Dunfee's accomplishment in Tokyo was recognized by the Canadian association of national team athletes with their True Sport Award for the athlete who "exemplifies the highest values of sport, including sportsmanship, perseverance and inclusion" in December 2021.

The transition to the 2022 season was difficult for Dunfee, who struggled with both a hamstring injury and depression relating to World Athletics' decision to retire from the 50 km event in favour of the new 35 km. He said it had "been a mental struggle for me, finding the motivation and mostly related to just coming to terms with the 50K not existing anymore, and that was so much of my identity." In his first major championship appearance in the new event, he finished seventh at the 2022 World Race Walking Team Championships in Muscat. He was sixth at the 2022 World Championships in Eugene, Oregon, which he said he was "thrilled" by in light of his recent difficulties. Later in the summer, Dunfee was named to the Canadian team for the 2022 Commonwealth Games in Birmingham, competing in the newly added 10,000 m walk. He won the gold medal in a new national and Commonwealth Games record time of 38:36.37.

Dunfee sought election to the Richmond City Council in the 2022 municipal elections. He finished tenth, two places short of election to the council.

At the 2023 World Athletics Championships, Dunfee competed in the 20 km walk on the first day of the event, finishing fourth with a Canadian record time 1:18:03. He went on to finish fourth as well in the 35 km walk, having torn his hamstring around 32 kilometres into the race. He said that recovery times would likely preclude his planned participation in the 2023 Pan American Games.

But Dunfee did compete at the 2023 Pan American Games in Santiago, Chile. He finished 9th in the 20 km walk in 1:22:14, and afterwards said "The hamstring was a big setback, but ... I went out there and I gave it my best shot."

In 2024 he served as a creative consultant on the sports comedy film Racewalkers, in which he has a small background role.

He placed fifth in the 20K walk, the only distance contested at the Olympics, at the 2024 Paris Games.

On March 22, 2025, Dunfee broke the world record in the 35 km race walk by 7 seconds, setting a new time of 2:21:40 at the Dudince 50, a World Athletics Race Walking Tour Gold meet in Slovakia; the record stood for shortly under 2 months, until it was surpassed by Massimo Stano of Italy on 18 May 2025.

At the 2025 Tokyo World Athletics Championships, his seventh world championships, Dunfee won gold in the men's 35-kilometre race walk, finishing the race in 2:28:22, only 33 seconds ahead of the second-place finisher.

== Personal bests ==
Event	Result	Venue	Date
Road walk
10 km	39:22 min	Madrid, Spain	June 1, 2025
20 km	1:17:39 hrs	Adelaide, Australia	February 19, 2025
35 km	2:21:40 hrs	Dudince, Slovakia	March 22, 2025
50 km	3:41:38 hrs	Rio de Janeiro, Brazil	August 19, 2016
Track walk
5000 m	18:39.08 min	Burnaby, Canada	June 18, 2021
10,000 m	38:36.37 min	Birmingham, United Kingdom	August 7, 2022
20,000 m	1:25:15.0 hrs (ht)	Calgary, Canada	June 25, 2011

== Competition record ==
Year	Competition	Venue	Position	Event	Notes
Representing Canada
2007	World Youth Championships	Ostrava, Czech Republic	23rd	10,000 m	47:40.86
2008	World Junior Championships	Bydgoszcz, Poland	10th	10,000 m	42:56.82
2009	Pan American Race Walking Cup (U20)	San Salvador, El Salvador	4th	10 km	44:16
2009	Pan American Junior Championships	Port of Spain, Trinidad and Tobago	6th	10,000 m	43:27.04
2010	World Race Walking Cup	Chihuahua, Mexico	–	20 km	DNF
2010	Commonwealth Games	Delhi, India	6th	20 km	1:28:13
2011	Universiade	Shenzhen, China	14th	20 km	1:29:13
2012	Oceania Race Walking Championships	Hobart, Australia	4th^{†}	20 km	1:25:17
2012	World Race Walking Cup	Saransk, Russia	–	20 km	DNF
2012	World Race Walking Cup	Saransk, Russia	15th	Team (20 km)	180 pts
2012	NACAC U23 Championships	Irapuato, Mexico	1st	20,000 m	1:26:15.32 A
2013	Pan American Race Walking Cup	Guatemala City, Guatemala	4th	20 km	1:25:43 A
2013	Universiade	Kazan, Russia	21st	20 km	1:31:07
2013	Universiade	Kazan, Russia	3rd	Team (20 km)	4:20:35
2013	World Championships	Moscow, Russia	36th	50 km	3:59:28
2013	Jeux de la Francophonie	Nice, France	2nd	20 km	1:25:30
2014	World Race Walking Cup	Taicang, China	11th	20 km	1:20:13
2014	World Race Walking Cup	Taicang, China	4th	Team (20 km)	36 pts
2015	Pan American Race Walking Cup	Arica, Chile	4th	20 km	1:21:54
2015	Pan American Race Walking Cup	Arica, Chile	1st	Team (20 km)	21 pts
2015	World Championships	Beijing, China	12th	20 km	1:21:48
2015	World Championships	Beijing, China	12th	50 km	3:49:56
2016	World Race Walking Team Championships	Rome, Italy	16th	20 km	1:21:26
2016	World Race Walking Team Championships	Rome, Italy	2nd	Team (20 km)	28 pts
2016	Olympic Games	Rio de Janeiro, Brazil	10th	20 km	1:20:49
2016	Olympic Games	Rio de Janeiro, Brazil	4th	50 km	3:41:38
2017	World Championships	London, United Kingdom	15th	50 km	3:47:36
2018	Commonwealth Games	Gold Coast, Australia	8th	20 km	1:23:26
2018	World Race Walking Team Championships	Taicang, China	12th	50 km	3:50:18
2018	NACAC Championships	Toronto, Canada	1st	20 km	1:25:39
2019	World Championships	Doha, Qatar	3rd	50 km	4:05:02
2021	Olympic Games	Tokyo, Japan	3rd	50 km	3:50:59
2022	World Race Walking Team Championships	Muscat, Oman	7th	35 km	2:38:08
2022	World Championships	Eugene, United States	6th	35 km	2:25:02
2022	Commonwealth Games	Birmingham, United Kingdom	1st	10,000 m	38:36.37
2022	NACAC Championships	Freeport, Bahamas	2nd	20,000 m	1:27:18
2023	World Championships	Budapest, Hungary	4th	20 km	1:18:03
2023	World Championships	Budapest, Hungary	4th	35 km	2:25:28
2023	Pan American Games	Santiago, Chile	9th	20 km	1:22:14
2025	World Championships	Tokyo, Japan	1st	35 km	2:28:22
2026	Commonwealth Games	Glasgow, United Kingdom	3rd	10,000 m	40:03.39

^{†}: Guest appearance out of competition.
