= Sergey Bakulin =

Russian racewalker (born 1986)

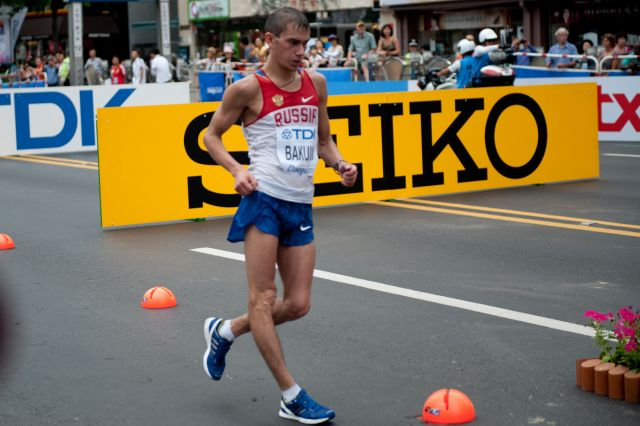
- Bakulin at the 2011 World championships Athletics in Daegu.

Personal information
- Full name: Sergey Vasilyevich Bakulin
- Born: 13 November 1986 (age 39)
- Height: 1.69 m (5 ft 6 1/2 in)
- Weight: 58 kg (128 lb)

Sport
- Country: Russia
- Sport: Athletics
- Event: 50km Race Walk
Medal record
World Championships
Disqualified	2011 Daegu	50 km walk

Sergey Vasilyevich Bakulin (Russian: Серге́й Васильевич Бакулин; born 13 November 1986 in Insar, Mordvin ASSR) is a male race walker from Russia.

== Biography ==
He was originally the 2011 World Champion in the 50 kilometres race walk before losing his medal for doping infringements. He originally finished in 6th place in the same race in the 2012 Olympics before that result, too, was expunged. He was advanced to 5th place when teammate Igor Yerokhin was disqualified and banned for life following a second finding of irregularities in his biological passport, an indicator of performance-enhancing drugs.

=== Disqualification ===
Bakulin began serving a previously unannounced suspension for irregularities in his biological passport beginning in December 2012. Suspicions that he had been suspended began when Bakulin failed to defend his World Championship title on home soil, even though he was given a bye to do so. Bakulin is coached by Viktor Chegin who has a history of training athletes banned for doping violations. Bakulin could face additional suspensions as photographs apparently reveal he has competed while serving the original suspension. On 20 January 2015 Bakulin was disqualified for 3 years and 2 months starting from 24 December 2012, and all his results between 25 January 2011 and 25 March 2011, between 16 July 2011 and 16 August 2011, as well as between 11 April 2012 and 11 June 2012 were annulled. On 25 March 2015, the IAAF filed an appeal with the Court of Arbitration in Lausanne, Switzerland, questioning the selective suspension periods of the six athletes involved including the window that opened up less than a month before his World Championship gold medal. On 24 March 2016, his results from 25 February 2011 to 24 December 2012 were disqualified. He received a second doping ban in August 2019, banning him for 8 years up to April 2027 with all of his results from 20 May 2018 to 3 April 2019 disqualified.

== International competitions ==
Year	Competition	Venue	Position	Event	Notes
Representing Russia
2006	World Race Walking Cup	A Coruña, Spain	6th	20 km	1:20:10
2006	European Championships	Gothenburg, Sweden	5th	20 km	1:20:50
2007	European U23 Championships	Debrecen, Hungary	3rd	20 km	1:23:33
2008	World Race Walking Cup	Cheboksary, Russia	—	20 km	DQ
2009	European Race Walking Cup	Metz, France	4th	50 km	3:52:38
2009	European Race Walking Cup	Metz, France	1st	Team – 50 km	8 pts
2009	Universiade	Belgrade, Serbia	1st	20 km	1:20.52
2010	World Race Walking Cup	Chihuahua, Mexico	DSQ	20 km	1:24:05
2010	European Championships	Barcelona, Spain	DSQ	50 km	3:43:26
2011	World Championships	Daegu, South Korea	DSQ	50 km	3:41:24
2012	World Race Walking Cup	Saransk, Russia	DSQ	50 km	3:46:14
2012	Olympic Games	London, United Kingdom	DSQ	50 km	3:38:55
