= Athletics at the 2010 Commonwealth Games – Men's 20 kilometres walk =

Men's 20 kilometres walk at the Commonwealth Games

The Men's 20 kilometres walk at the 2010 Commonwealth Games as part of the athletics programme was held on Saturday 9 October 2010.

== Records ==
World Record	1:16:43	Sergey Morozov	RUS	Saransk, Russia	8 June 2008
Games Record	1:19.55	Nathan Deakes	AUS	Melbourne, Australia	20 March 2006

== Results ==
Rank	Athlete	Time	Notes
1st place, gold medalist(s)	Jared Tallent (AUS)	1:22:18	
2nd place, silver medalist(s)	Luke Adams (AUS)	1:22:31	
3rd place, bronze medalist(s)	Harminder Singh (IND)	1:23:28	PB
4	David Kimutai Rotich (KEN)	1:25:29	
5	Iñaki Gomez (CAN)	1:27:09	PB
6	Evan Dunfee (CAN)	1:28:13	
7	Josephat Kipchumba Sirma (KEN)	1:28:15	
8	Chris Erickson (AUS)	1:28:35	PB
9	Baljinder Singh (IND)	1:29:18	
10	Luke Finch (ENG)	1:29:37	
11	Tom Bosworth (ENG)	1:30:44	
12	Sylvanus Wekesa Karani (KEN)	1:32:00	
13	Alex Wright (ENG)	1:34:26	
14	Lo Choon Sieng (MAS)	1:35:29	
15	Teoh Boon Lim (MAS)	1:36:45	
	Panucha Babu Bhai (IND)	DNF	
