= Athletics at the 2011 Summer Universiade – Men's 20 kilometres walk =

The men's 20 kilometres walk event at the 2011 Summer Universiade was held on 18 August.

== Medalists ==
=== Individual ===
Gold	Silver	Bronze
Andrey Krivov; Russia	Andrés Chocho; Ecuador	Moacir Zimmermann; Brazil

=== Team ===
Gold	Silver	Bronze
Russia; Andrey Krivov; Mikhail Ryzhov; Andrey Ruzavin	China; Cai Zelin; Yu Wei; Niu Wenbin; Yang Tao	

== Results ==
Rank	Name	Nationality	Time	Notes
1st place, gold medalist(s)	Andrey Krivov	Russia	1:24:15	
2nd place, silver medalist(s)	Andrés Chocho	Ecuador	1:24:44	
3rd place, bronze medalist(s)	Moacir Zimmermann	Brazil	1:25:06	
4	Inaki Gomez	Canada	1:26:21	
5	Marius Žiūkas	Lithuania	1:26:30	
6	Cai Zelin	China	1:26:55	
7	Caio Bonfim	Brazil	1:27:19	
8	Jakub Jelonek	Poland	1:27:26	
9	Federico Tontodonati	Italy	1:27:32	
10	Łukasz Nowak	Poland	1:27:53	
11	Yu Wei	China	1:28:51	
12	Niu Wenbin	China	1:29:10	SB
13	Evan Dunfee	Canada	1:29:13	
14	Brendan Boyce	Ireland	1:29:48	
15	Brendon Reading	Australia	1:30:26	
16	Andrey Ruzavin	Russia	1:30:38	
17	Daichi Aono	Japan	1:32:00	
18	Michael Doyle	Ireland	1:32:48	
19	Yang Tao	China	1:33:01	
20	Ricard Rekst	Lithuania	1:33:43	
21	Lo Choon Sieng	Malaysia	1:38:12	
	Carl Dohmann	Germany	DQ	230.6
	Ian Rayson	Australia	DQ	230.6
	Carmody Shandele	Zambia	DNS	
	Mikhail Ryzhov	Russia	DNS	
