= Jakub Jelonek =

Polish racewalker

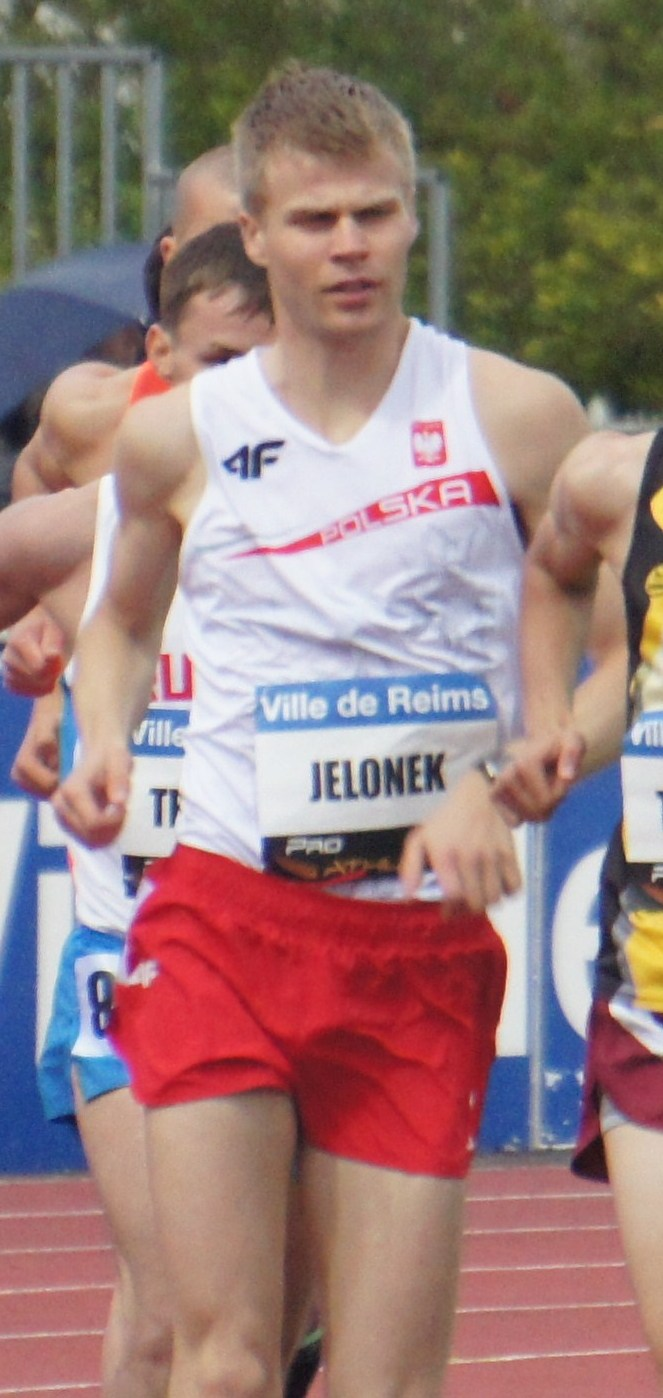
Jakub Jelonek in 2013

Jakub Jelonek (born 7 July 1985 in Częstochowa) is a Polish race walker.

== Achievements ==
Year	Competition	Venue	Position	Event	Notes
Representing Poland
2003	European Race Walking Cup (U20)	Cheboksary, Russia	24th	10 km	45:06
2006	World Race Walking Cup	A Coruña, Spain	83rd	20 km	1:36:27
2007	European Race Walking Cup	Royal Leamington Spa, United Kingdom	31st	20 km	1:25:52
2007	European U23 Championships	Debrecen, Hungary	8th	20 km	1:28:06
2008	World Race Walking Cup	Cheboksary, Russia	40th	20 km	1:24:26
2008	Olympic Games	Beijing, China	46th	20 km walk	1:30:37
2009	Universiade	Belgrade, Serbia	16th	20 km walk	1:26:50
2009	World Championships	Berlin, Germany	38th	20 km walk	1:28:59
2010	World Race Walking Cup	Chihuahua, Mexico	26th	20 km	1:27:35
2010	European Championships	Barcelona, Spain	8th	20 km walk	1:22:24
2011	European Race Walking Cup	Olhão, Portugal	2nd	20 km	1:23:59
2011	Universiade	Shenzhen, China	9th	20 km walk	1:27:26
2012	World Race Walking Cup	Saransk, Russia	36th	20 km	1:24:18
2013	European Race Walking Cup	Dudince, Slovakia	20th	20 km	1:25:25
2013	European Race Walking Cup	Dudince, Slovakia	3rd	Team – 20 km	44 pts
