= Men's 35 kilometres walk world record progression =

The following table shows the world record progression in the men's 35 kilometres race walk, as recognised by World Athletics.

== World record progression ==
Ratified
Not ratified
Ratified but later rescinded
Pending ratification

Time	Athlete	Date	Place	Ref.
2:21:31	Vladimir Kanaykin (RUS)	19 February 2006	Sochi, Russia	
2:21:47	Masatora Kawano (JPN)	27 October 2024	Takahata, Japan	
2:21:40	Evan Dunfee (CAN)	22 March 2025	Dudince, Slovakia	
2:20:43	Massimo Stano (ITA)	18 May 2025	Poděbrady, Czech Republic	
