= Athletics at the 2009 Summer Universiade – Men's 20 kilometres walk =

The men's 20 kilometres walk event at the 2009 Summer Universiade was held on 9 July.

== Results ==
Rank	Name	Nationality	Time	Notes
1st place, gold medalist(s)	Sergey Bakulin	Russia	1:20:52	GR
2nd place, silver medalist(s)	Andrey Ruzavin	Russia	1:21:08	SB
3rd place, bronze medalist(s)	Moacir Zimmermann	Brazil	1:21:35	
4	Wei Yang	China	1:21:57	
5	Kim Hyun-sub	South Korea	1:22:00	
6	Isamu Fujisawa	Japan	1:22:12	
7	Ruslan Dmytrenko	Ukraine	1:22:46	
8	Rafał Augustyn	Poland	1:23:00	SB
9	Jean-Jacques Nkouloukidi	Italy	1:24:13	
10	Park Chil-sung	South Korea	1:24:16	
11	Francisco Arcilla	Spain	1:24:43	SB
12	Andrés Chocho	Ecuador	1:24:51	
13	Yusuke Suzuki	Japan	1:25:08	
14	Konstantin Masimov	Russia	1:25:49	
15	Mohamed Ameur	Algeria	1:26:21	SB
16	Jakub Jelonek	Poland	1:26:50	
17	Dragoș Neacșu	Romania	1:27:35	
18	Vladimir Savanović	Serbia	1:27:53	
19	Thomas Barnes	Australia	1:28:11	
20	Inaki Gomez	Canada	1:29:55	
21	Ian Rayson	Australia	1:30:59	
	Álvaro García	Mexico	DQ	
	Mabrook Saleh Mohamed	Qatar	DNS	
	Adam Rutter	Australia	DNS	
