= Ruslan Dmytrenko =

Ukrainian racewalker (born 1986)

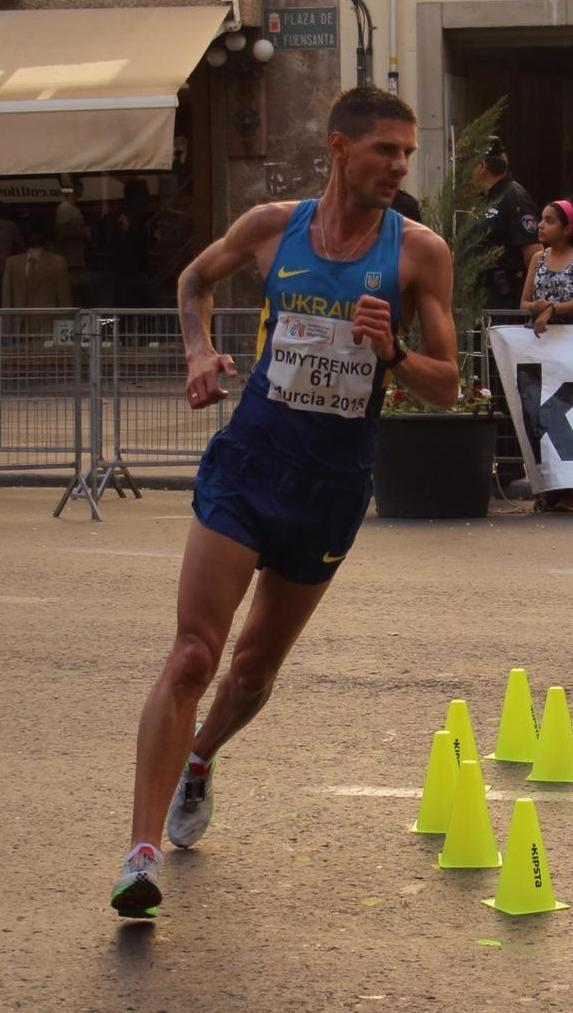
Dmytrenko at the 2015 European Cup Race Walking.

Ruslan Hryhorovych Dmytrenko (Ukrainian: Руслан Григорович Дмитренко; born 22 March 1986 in Kyiv Oblast) is a Ukrainian racewalker.

== Career ==
He competed in the 20 km walk at the 2012 Summer Olympics, where he placed 30th.

In February 2019 he was disqualified until 4 May 2020 for a doping rules violation, and all his results from 14 August 2009 to 3 August 2012 were annulled.

He was injured in a car crash in March 2020.

== Competition record ==
Year	Competition	Venue	Position	Event	Notes
Representing Ukraine
2005	European Race Walking Cup	Miskolc, Hungary	6th	10 km walk	42:15
2005	European Junior Championships	Kaunas, Lithuania	11th	10,000 m walk	44:02.00
2006	World Race Walking Cup	A Coruña, Spain	52nd	20 km walk	1:27:16
2007	European Race Walking Cup	Royal Leamington Spa, United Kingdom	47th	20 km walk	1:29:16
2007	European U23 Championships	Debrecen, Hungary	6th	20 km walk	1:26:25
2008	World Race Walking Cup	Cheboksary, Russia	52nd	20 km walk	1:25:26
2009	European Race Walking Cup	Metz, France	15th	20 km walk	1:30:50
2009	Universiade	Belgrade, Serbia	7th	20 km walk	1:22:46
2009	World Championships	Berlin, Germany	DSQ (33rd)	20 km walk	~~1:27:01~~
2010	European Championships	Barcelona, Spain	DSQ (12th)	20 km walk	~~1:22:45~~
2011	European Race Walking Cup	Olhão, Portugal	DSQ (30th)	20 km walk	~~1:32:55~~
2011	World Championships	Daegu, South Korea	DSQ (7th)	20 km walk	~~1:21:31~~
2012	World Race Walking Cup	Saransk, Russia	DSQ (4th)	20 km walk	~~1:20:17~~
2012	Olympic Games	London, United Kingdom	30th	20 km walk	1:23:21
2013	European Race Walking Cup	Dudince, Slovakia	5th	20 km	1:22:30
2013	European Race Walking Cup	Dudince, Slovakia	2nd	Team - 20 km	30 pts
2013	Universiade	Kazan, Russia	2nd	20 km walk	1:20:54
2013	Universiade	Kazan, Russia	2nd	Team - 20 km walk	4:08:09
2013	World Championships	Moscow, Russia	7th	20 km walk	1:22:14
2014	World Race Walking Cup	Taicang, China	1st	20 km walk	1:18:37
2014	European Championships	Zürich, Switzerland	4th	20 km walk	1:19:46
2015	European Race Walking Cup	Murcia, Spain	40th	20 km	1:32:38
2015	European Race Walking Cup	Murcia, Spain	3rd	Team - 20 km	37 pts
2015	World Championships	Beijing, China	21st	20 km walk	1:23:37
2016	World Race Walking Team Championships	Rome, Italy	9th	20 km walk	1:20:33
