= Athletics at the 2013 Summer Universiade – Men's 20 kilometres walk =

The men's 20 km race walk at the 2013 Summer Universiade was held on July 9.

== Medalists ==
=== Individual ===
Gold	Silver	Bronze
Andrey Krivov; Russia	Ruslan Dmytrenko; Ukraine	Denis Strelkov; Russia

=== Team ===
Gold	Silver	Bronze
Russia; Andrey Krivov; Denis Strelkov; Andrey Ruzavin; Konstantin Kulagov; Valery Filipchuk	Ukraine; Ruslan Dmytrenko; Ihor Hlavan; Ivan Losyev; Nazar Kovalenko	Canada; Inaki Gomez; Benjamin Thorne; Evan Dunfee

== Results ==
Official Video

=== Individual standing ===
Rank	Name	Nationality	Time	Notes
1st place, gold medalist(s)	Andrey Krivov	Russia	1:20:47	UR
2nd place, silver medalist(s)	Ruslan Dmytrenko	Ukraine	1:20:54	
3rd place, bronze medalist(s)	Denis Strelkov	Russia	1:21:32	
4	Andrey Ruzavin	Russia	1:22:12	
5	Inaki Gomez	Canada	1:22:29	SB
6	Ihor Hlavan	Ukraine	1:22:32	PB
7	Isaac Palma	Mexico	1:24:14	
8	Ivan Losyev	Ukraine	1:24:43	
9	Eiki Takahashi	Japan	1:25:19	
10	Nazar Kovalenko	Ukraine	1:25:32	
11	Anatole Ibáñez	Sweden	1:25:39	
12	Mauricio Arteaga	Ecuador	1:25:59	SB
13	Liu Jianmin	China	1:26:44	
14	Konstantin Kulagov	Russia	1:26:56	
15	Nils Gloger	Germany	1:26:57	
16	Benjamin Thorne	Canada	1:26:59	PB
17	Riccardo Macchia	Italy	1:28:16	
18	Bian Tongda	China	1:28:56	
19	Valery Filipchuk	Russia	1:29:39	
20	Perseus Karlstrom	Sweden	1:30:19	
21	Evan Dunfee	Canada	1:31:07	
22	Ever Palma	Mexico	1:31:07	
23	Zhao Ziyang	China	1:31:45	
24	Ricard Rekst	Lithuania	1:32:45	
25	Li Tianlei	China	1:34:57	
	Wayne Snyman	South Africa	DNF	
	Choe Byeong-kwang	South Korea	DQ	
	Aliaksandr Liakhovich	Belarus	DQ	
	Tomas Gaidamavičius	Lithuania	DQ	

=== Team standing ===
Rank	Nationality	Time	Notes
1st place, gold medalist(s)	Russia	4:04:31	
2nd place, silver medalist(s)	Ukraine	4:08:09	
3rd place, bronze medalist(s)	Canada	4:20:35	
4	China	4:27:25	
