= Iñaki Gómez =

Canadian race walker (born 1988)

Personal information
- Full name: Iñaki Gomez Goroztieta
- Nationality: Canada
- Born: 16 January 1988 (age 38) Mexico City, Mexico
- Home town: Vancouver, Canada
- Height: 5 ft 8 in (173 cm)
- Weight: 129 lb (59 kg)

Sport
- Sport: Race walking
- Event: 20 km
- College team: UBC Thunderbirds
Medal record
Pan American Games
| Silver medal – second place | 2015 Toronto | 20 km walk |

Iñaki Gomez Goroztieta (born 16 January 1988) is a Canadian retired race walker. He competed in the 20 kilometres walk event at the 2012 Summer Olympics, and finished in 13th place. More recently, he competed in the IAAF World Championships in Athletics in Moscow where he finished 8th place.

In university, Gomez won three NAIA 5000-metre race walk titles (2008-2010) as a member of the UBC Thunderbirds.

In July 2016, he was named to Canada's Olympic team. At the Rio Olympics, he finished in 12th place.

He announced retirement the following year, on 3 May 2017. In March 2018 Gómez was elected the World Athletics member of Athlete's Commission.

== Personal bests ==
| Event | Result | Venue | Date |
Road walk
| 10 km | 39:21 min | Nomi, Japan | 20 March 2016 |
| 20 km | 1:19:20 hrs | Nomi, Japan | 20 March 2016 |
Track walk
| 5000 m | 18:45.64 min | Sydney, Australia | 18 February 2012 |
| 10,000 m | 40:01.0 min (ht) | Moncton, Canada | 22 June 2013 |
| 20,000 m | 1:26:27.1 hrs (ht) | Calgary, Canada | 25 June 2011 |

== Achievements ==
| Year | Competition | Venue | Position | Event | Notes |
Representing Canada
| 2007 | Pan American Junior Championships | São Paulo, Brazil | 7th | 10,000m track walk | 46:08.84 |
| 2008 | NACAC U-23 Championships | Toluca, Mexico | 4th | 20,000m track walk | 1:36:08.82 A |
| 2009 | Pan American Race Walking Cup | San Salvador, El Salvador | 16th | 20 km | 1:31:19 |
| 2009 | Universiade | Beograd, Serbia | 20th | 20 km | 1:29:55 |
| 2009 | Jeux de la Francophonie | Beirut, Lebanon | — | 20 km | DNF |
| 2010 | World Race Walking Cup | Chihuahua, Mexico | 45th | 20 km | 1:31:14 |
| 2010 | Commonwealth Games | Delhi, India | 5th | 20 km | 1:27:09 |
| 2011 | Universiade | Shenzhen, China | 5th | 20 km | 1:26:21 |
| 2012 | Oceania Race Walking Championships | Hobart, Australia | 3rd^{†} | 20 km | 1:24:46 |
| 2012 | World Race Walking Cup | Saransk, Russia | 11th | 20 km | 1:21:58 |
| 2012 | World Race Walking Cup | Saransk, Russia | 15th | Team (20 km) | 180 pts |
| 2012 | Olympic Games | London, United Kingdom | 13th | 20 km | 1:20:58 |
| 2013 | Pan American Race Walking Cup | Guatemala City, Guatemala | 8th | 20 km | 1:27:58 A |
| 2013 | Universiade | Kazan, Russia | 5th | 20 km | 1:22:29 |
| 2013 | Universiade | Kazan, Russia | 3rd | 20 km walk team | 4:20:35 |
| 2013 | World Championships | Moscow, Russia | 8th | 20 km | 1:22:21 |
| 2014 | World Race Walking Cup | Taicang, China | 12th | 20 km | 1:20:18 |
| 2014 | World Race Walking Cup | Taicang, China | 4th | Team (20 km) | 36 pts |
| 2015 | Pan American Race Walking Cup | Arica, Chile | 7th | 20 km | 1:23:31 |
| 2015 | Pan American Race Walking Cup | Arica, Chile | 1st | Team (20 km) | 21 pts |
| 2015 | World Championships | Beijing, China | 14th | 20 km walk | 1:21:55 |

^{†}: Guest appearance out of competition.

== See also ==
- Canadian records in track and field
