= Yuriy Andronov =

Russian race walker

Personal information
- Nationality: Russian
- Born: November 6, 1971 (age 54) Samara, Soviet Union

Sport
- Sport: Athletics
- Event: Racewalking

Yuriy Vladimirovich Andronov (Russian: Юрий Владимирович Андронов; born 6 November 1971 in Samara) is a Russian race walker.

He was disqualified from the 2014 IAAF World Race Walking Cup, having failed a doping test, and was banned from the sport for two years.

== International competitions ==
| Year | Competition | Venue | Position | Event | Notes |
Representing Russia
| 2001 | European Race Walking Cup | Dudince, Slovakia | 12th | 50 km | 3:52:57 |
| 2001 | European Race Walking Cup | Dudince, Slovakia | 1st | Team - 50 km | 11 pts |
| 2002 | European Championships | Munich, Germany | — | 50 km | DQ |
| 2004 | Olympic Games | Athens, Greece | 9th | 50 km | 3:50:28 |
| 2004 | World Race Walking Cup | Naumburg, Germany | 3rd | 50 km | 3:46:49 |
| 2005 | European Race Walking Cup | Miskolc, Hungary | 3rd | 50 km | 3:42:34 |
| 2005 | European Race Walking Cup | Miskolc, Hungary | 1st | Team - 50 km | 6 pts |
| 2006 | European Championships | Gothenburg, Sweden | 3rd | 50 km | 3:43:26 |
| 2006 | World Race Walking Cup | La Coruña, Spain | 3rd | 50 km | 3:42:38 |
| 2007 | European Race Walking Cup | Royal Leamington Spa, United Kingdom | 5th | 50 km | 3:42:55 |
| 2007 | European Race Walking Cup | Royal Leamington Spa, United Kingdom | 1st | Team - 50 km | 8 pts |
| 2009 | European Race Walking Cup | Metz, France | 3rd | 50 km | 3:49:09 |
| 2009 | European Race Walking Cup | Metz, France | 1st | Team - 50 km | 8 pts |
| 2009 | World Championships | Berlin, Germany | — | 50 km | DNF |
| 2010 | European Championships | Barcelona, Spain | 10th | 50 km | 3:54:22 |
| 2010 | IAAF World Race Walking Cup | Chihuahua, Mexico | 12th | 50 km | 3:58:21 |
| 2014 | IAAF World Race Walking Cup | Taicang, China | — | 50 km | DQ (Doping) |
