= Jorge Costa (race walker) =

Portuguese race walker

Jorge Costa (born 20 March 1961) is a Portuguese race walker.

== Achievements ==
Year	Competition	Venue	Position	Event	Notes
Representing Portugal
1999	World Race Walking Cup	Mézidon-Canon, France	70th	50 km	4:15:59
2000	European Race Walking Cup	Eisenhüttenstadt, Germany	35th	50 km	4:13:11
2001	European Race Walking Cup	Dudince, Slovakia	23rd	50 km	4:04:54
2001	World Championships	Edmonton, Canada	25th	50 km	4:07:48
2002	European Championships	Munich, Germany	—	50 km	DNF
2004	Olympic Games	Athens, Greece	34th	50 km	4:12:24
2004	World Race Walking Cup	Naumburg, Germany	13th	50 km	3:55:31
2005	World Championships	Helsinki, Finland	22nd	50 km	4:22:17
2006	World Race Walking Cup	A Coruña, Spain	27th	50 km	3:59:27
2006	European Championships	Gothenburg, Sweden	19th	50 km	4:03:48
2007	World Championships	Osaka, Japan	27th	50 km	4:16:05
2008	World Race Walking Cup	Cheboksary, Russia	32nd	50 km	4:01:05
2009	European Race Walking Cup	Metz, France	13th	50 km	4:04:10
2010	World Race Walking Cup	Chihuahua, Mexico	34th	50 km	4:17:19
2011	European Race Walking Cup	Olhão, Portugal	25th	50 km	4:25:04
