= Mária Gáliková =

Slovak racewalker

Personal information
- Born: 21 August 1980 (age 45) Nová Baňa
- Height: 161 cm (5 ft 3 in)

Sport
- Country: Slovakia
- Sport: Athletics
- Event: Racewalking
Medal record
European Cup
Bronze medal – third place	2009 Metz	20 km team
- Updated on 29 August 2015

Mária Gáliková (born 21 August 1980) is a racewalker from Slovakia.

She competed in the Women's 20 kilometres walk event at the 2015 World Championships in Athletics in Beijing, China, and the 2016 Summer Olympics.

== See also ==
- Slovakia at the 2015 World Championships in Athletics
