= Santiago Pérez (race walker) =

Spanish racewalker

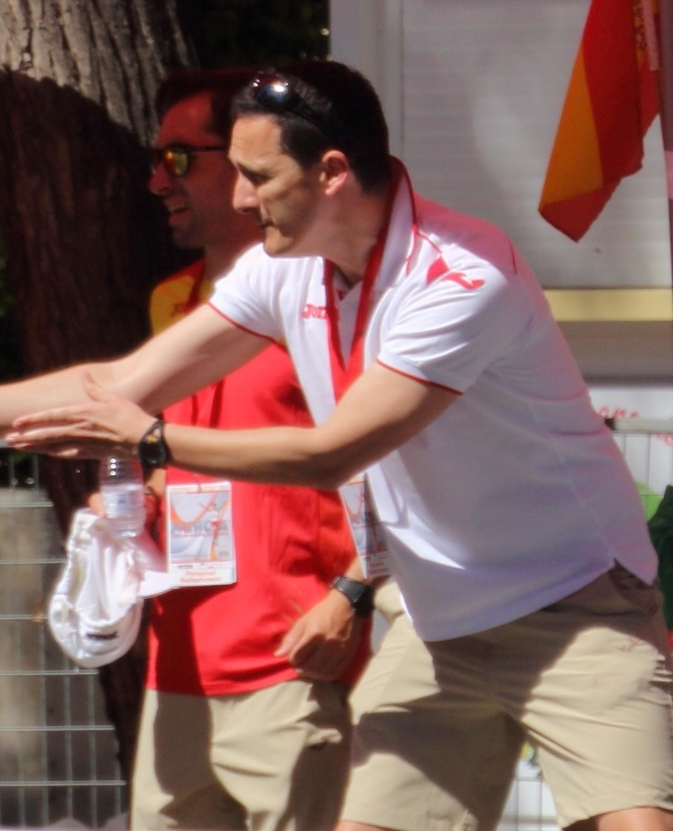
Pérez in 2015

Santiago Pérez Alonso (born 12 January 1972 in Vigo, Pontevedra) is a Spanish race walker.

== Achievements ==
Year	Competition	Venue	Position	Event	Notes
Representing Spain
1997	World Race Walking Cup	Poděbrady, Czech Republic	21st	50 km	3:54:28
1997	World Championships	Athens, Greece	21st	50 km	4:05:25
1998	European Championships	Budapest, Hungary	6th	50 km	3:48:17
1999	World Race Walking Cup	Mézidon-Canon, France	14th	50 km	3:48:27
1999	World Championships	Seville, Spain	26th	50 km	4:11:30
2000	European Race Walking Cup	Eisenhüttenstadt, Germany	8th	50 km	3:51:24
2000	European Race Walking Cup	Eisenhüttenstadt, Germany	2nd	Team - 50 km	15 pts
2001	European Race Walking Cup	Dudince, Slovakia	4th	50 km	3:46:52
2001	European Race Walking Cup	Dudince, Slovakia	2nd	Team - 50 km	21 pts
2002	European Championships	Munich, Germany	12th	50 km	3:55:50
2004	Olympic Games	Athens, Greece	8th	50 km	3:49:48
2004	World Race Walking Cup	Naumburg, Germany	8th	50 km	3:52:58
2007	World Championships	Osaka, Japan	—	50 km	DNF
2008	World Race Walking Cup	Cheboksary, Russia	33rd	50 km	4:02:09
2008	Olympic Games	Beijing, China	26th	50 km	3:59:41
2009	European Race Walking Cup	Metz, France	16th	50 km	4:08:17
2009	European Race Walking Cup	Metz, France	3rd	Team - 50 km	38 pts
