= Stanislav Emelyanov =

Russian race walker (born 1990)

Personal information
- Born: 23 October 1990 (age 35) Saransk, Russia

Sport
- Sport: Athletics
- Event: Race walking
- Coached by: Viktor Chegin; Yuri Ryabov

Achievements and titles
- Personal best(s): 10 km – 38:28 (2009); 20 km – 1:19:43 (2010)

Stanislav Valeryevich Emelyanov (Russian: Станислав Валерьевич Емельянов; born 23 October 1990) is a former Russian race walker.

== Doping ==
=== Bio passport ban ===
IAAF announced on 28 July 2014 that Emelyanov was sanctioned for doping after his biological passport had shown anomalies. His ban ended 14 December 2014. Emelyanov was the 17th athlete trained by Viktor Chegin to be banned for doping.

=== EPO positive ===
In September 2015 IAAF confirmed that Emelyanov was provisionally suspended after a sample from an out-of-competition control in Saransk in June had been found positive for a prohibited substance. Emelyanov had the previous day given interviews saying his B sample had been found negative, and that the substance in question was EPO.

Emelyanov was given an 8-year ban for second doping offence, commencing on 7 April 2017 and has been stripped of all results obtained after 2 June 2015. This ban was extended indefinitely in March 2018.

== International competitions ==
Year	Competition	Venue	Position	Event	Notes
Representing Russia
2007	World Youth Championships	Ostrava, Czech Republic	1st	10,000 m track walk	41:49.91
2008	World Junior Championships	Bydgoszcz, Poland	1st	10,000 m track walk	39:35.01
2009	European Race Walking Cup (U20)	Metz, France	1st	10 km	41:22
2009	European Race Walking Cup (U20)	Metz, France	1st	Team – 10 km Junior	3 pts
2009	European Junior Championships	Novi Sad, Serbia	1st	10,000 m track walk	40:20.86
2010	European Championships	Barcelona, Spain	~~1st~~ —	20 km	DSQ
2011	European Race Walking Cup	Olhão, Portugal	~~1st~~ —	20 km	DSQ
