= Ivan Losev (race walker) =

Ukrainian racewalker

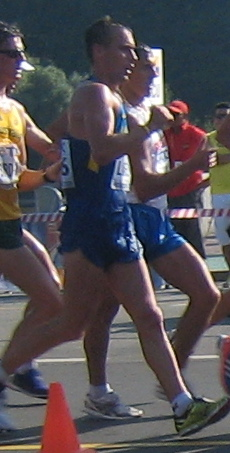
Ivan Losyev in 2013

Ivan Volodymyrovych Losyev (Ukrainian: Іван Володимирович Лосев; born 26 January 1986 in Brovary) is a Ukrainian racewalker.

== Career ==
He competed in the 20 kilometer walk at the 2012 Summer Olympics, where he placed 47th.

== Achievements ==
Year	Competition	Venue	Position	Event	Notes
Representing Ukraine
2006	World Race Walking Cup	A Coruña, Spain	81st	20 km	1:34:37
2007	European U23 Championships	Debrecen, Hungary	11th	20 km	1:31:13
2008	World Race Walking Cup	Cheboksary, Russia	–	50 km	DNF
2009	European Race Walking Cup	Metz, France	14th	20 km	1:30:00
2011	European Race Walking Cup	Olhão, Portugal	17th	50 km	4:10:02
2012	World Race Walking Cup	Saransk, Russia	12th	20 km	1:21:57
2012	Olympic Games	London, United Kingdom	47th	20 km	1:26:50
2013	European Race Walking Cup	Dudince, Slovakia	14th	20 km	1:24:05
2013	European Race Walking Cup	Dudince, Slovakia	2nd	Team - 20 km	30 pts
2013	Universiade	Kazan, Russia	8th	20 km walk	1:24:43
2013	Universiade	Kazan, Russia	2nd	20 km walk team	4:08:09
2013	World Championships	Moscow, Russia	30th	20 km	1:26:32
2014	World Race Walking Cup	Taicang, China	52nd	20 km	1:23:40
2015	World Championships	Beijing, China	39th	20 km walk	1:26:32
