= Oleksiy Kazanin =

Ukrainian race walker (born 1982)

Personal information
- Born: May 22, 1982 (age 44)
- Height: 1.72 m (5 ft 7 1/2 in)
- Weight: 65 kg (143 lb)

Sport
- Country: Ukraine
- Sport: Athletics
- Event: 50km Race Walk

Oleksiy Kazanin (born 22 May 1982) is a Ukrainian race walker. He is married to Olena Shumkina who is also a race walker.

== Achievements ==
Year	Competition	Venue	Position	Event	Notes
Representing Ukraine
2005	World Championships	Helsinki, Finland	—	50 km	DNF
2006	World Race Walking Cup	A Coruña, Spain	—	50 km	DNF
2008	World Race Walking Cup	Cheboksary, Russia	10th	50 km	3:50:30
2008	Olympic Games	Beijing, China	—	50 km	DNF
2009	European Race Walking Cup	Metz, France	—	50 km	DNF
2011	European Race Walking Cup	Olhão, Portugal	8th	50 km	4:03:19
2011	World Championships	Daegu, South Korea	20th	50 km	3:56:18
2012	World Race Walking Cup	Saransk, Russia	10th	50 km	3:50:17
2012	Olympic Games	London, United Kingdom	—	50 km	DQ
2013	European Race Walking Cup	Dudince, Slovakia	13th	50 km	3:54:40
2013	European Race Walking Cup	Dudince, Slovakia	2nd	Team - 50 km	19 pts
2014	World Race Walking Cup	Taicang, China	5th	50 km	3:47:01
2015	European Race Walking Cup	Murcia, Spain	—	50 km	DNF
