= Andrey Krivov =

Russian racewalker (born 1985)

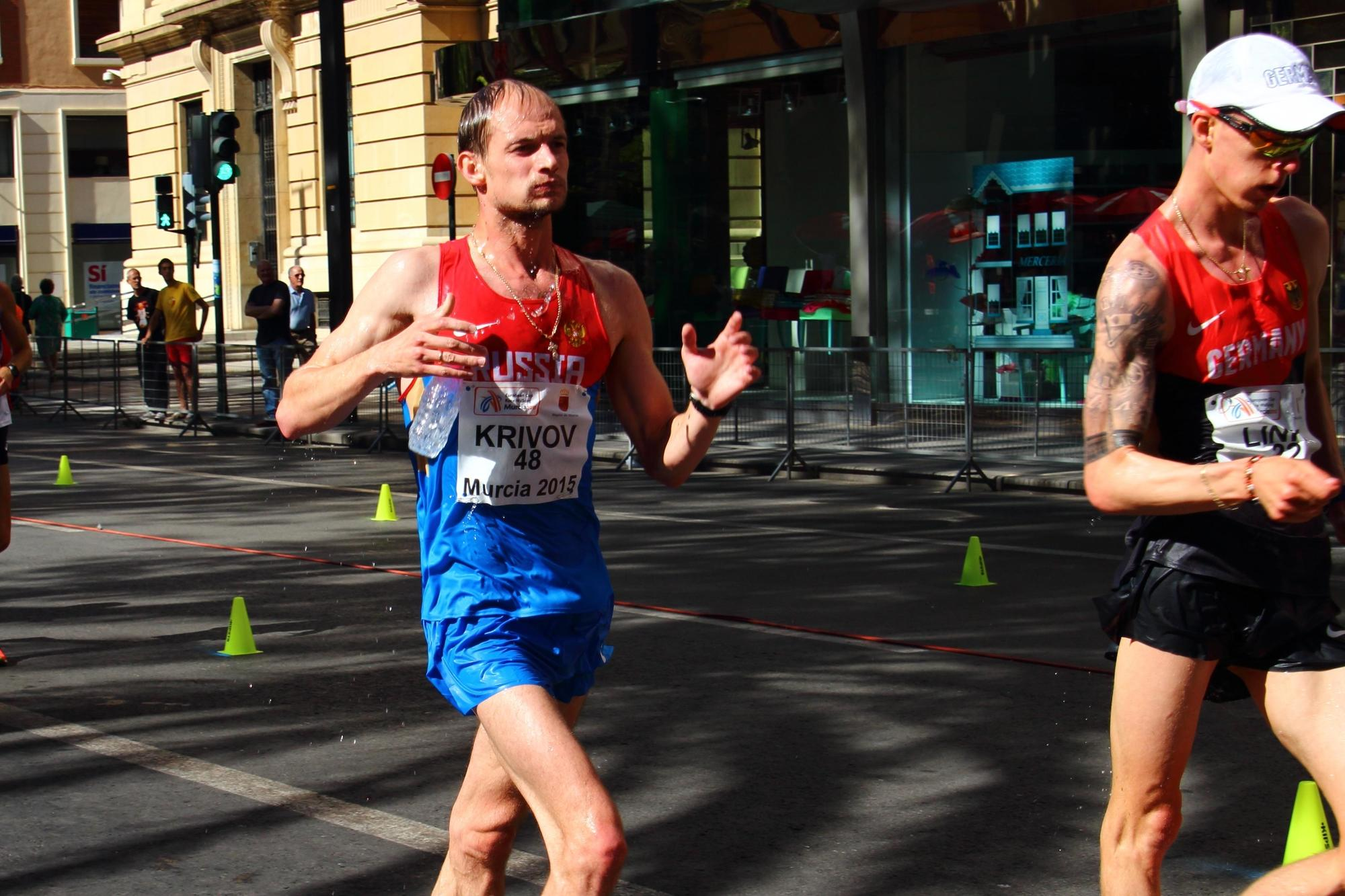
- Krivov at the 2015 European Cup Race Walking

Personal information
- Full name: Andrey Anatolyevich Krivov
- Born: November 14, 1985 (age 40) Komsomolsky, Chamzinsky District, Mordovia
- Height: 1.85 m (6 ft 1 in)
- Weight: 72 kg (159 lb)

Sport
- Country: Russia
- Sport: Men's athletics
- Event: 20km Race Walk
Medal record
World Race Walking Cup
Silver medal – second place	2012 Saransk	20 km walk
Bronze medal – third place	2010 Chihuahua	20 km walk
Universiade
Gold medal – first place	2011 Shenzhen	20 km walk
Gold medal – first place	2011 Shenzhen	Team 20 km walk
Gold medal – first place	2013 Kazan	20 km walk
Gold medal – first place	2013 Kazan	Team 20 km walk

Andrey Anatolyevich Krivov (Russian: Андрей Анатольевич Кривов; born 14 November 1985 in Komsomolsky, Chamzinsky District, Mordovia) is a Russian race walker.

== Achievements ==
Year	Competition	Venue	Position	Event	Notes
Representing Russia
2007	European U23 Championships	Debrecen, Hungary	2nd	20 km	1:21:51
2008	World Race Walking Cup	Cheboksary, Russia	5th	20 km	1:19:10
2009	European Race Walking Cup	Metz, France	27th	20 km	1:38:18
2009	World Championships	Berlin, Germany	17th	20 km	1:22:19
2010	World Race Walking Cup	Chihuahua, Mexico	3rd	20 km	1:22:54
2010	European Championships	Barcelona, Spain	5th	20 km	1:22:20
2011	European Race Walking Cup	Olhão, Portugal	7th	20 km	1:25:14
2011	Universiade	Shenzhen, China	1st	20 km	1:24:15
2011	Universiade	Shenzhen, China	1st	Team 20 km	4:19:19
2012	World Race Walking Cup	Saransk, Russia	2nd	20 km	1:19:27
2012	Olympic Games	London, United Kingdom	37th	20 km	1:24:17
2013	Universiade	Kazan, Russia	1st	20 km	1:20:47
2013	Universiade	Kazan, Russia	1st	Team 20 km	4:04:31
2015	European Race Walking Cup	Murcia, Spain	6th	20 km	1:22:05
2015	European Race Walking Cup	Murcia, Spain	2nd	Team - 20 km	35 pts
