= Tadas Šuškevičius =

Lithuanian racewalker (born 1985)

Personal information
- Born: 22 May 1985 (age 41)
- Height: 1.76 m (5 ft 9 in)
- Weight: 65 kg (143 lb)

Sport
- Country: Lithuania
- Sport: Athletics
- Event: 50km Race Walk

Tadas Šuškevičius (born 22 May 1985 in Vilnius) is a race-walker who competes internationally for Lithuania.

He finished 32nd in the 50 km walk at the 2008 Olympics in Beijing and 45th at the 2012 Olympics. He also competed at the 2009 World Championships in Athletics reaching 17th place and setting a then personal record. Since then he has also competed at the 2011, 2013 and 2015 World Championships.

== Achievements ==
Year	Competition	Venue	Position	Event	Notes
Representing Lithuania
2004	World Race Walking Cup	Naumburg, Germany	23rd	10 km	44:52
2005	European U23 Championships	Erfurt, Germany	14th	20 km	1:32:42
2006	World Race Walking Cup	A Coruña, Spain	60th	20 km	1:28:05
2007	European U23 Championships	Debrecen, Hungary	—	20 km	DQ
2008	World Race Walking Cup	Cheboksary, Russia	60th	20 km	1:26:05
2008	Olympic Games	Beijing, China	32nd	50 km	4:02:45
2009	European Race Walking Cup	Metz, France	—	20 km	DNF
2009	World Championships	Berlin, Germany	17th	50 km	3:54:29 (PB)
2010	European Championships	Barcelona, Spain	9th	50 km	3:52:31 (PB)
2011	European Race Walking Cup	Olhão, Portugal	—	20 km	DQ
2011	World Championships	Daegu, South Korea	—	50 km	DQ
2012	World Race Walking Cup	Saransk, Russia	42nd	50 km	4:06:29
2012	Olympic Games	London, United Kingdom	45th	50 km	4:08:16
2013	European Race Walking Cup	Dudince, Slovakia	44th	20 km	1:32:19
2013	World Championships	Moscow, Russia	38th	50 km	4:01:29
2014	European Championships	Zurich, Switzerland	17th	50 km	3:52:39
2015	World Championships	Beijing, China	22nd	50 km	3:56:27

== Personal bests ==
Event	Result	Year	Place
10 km walk	41:43	2004	Alytus, Lithuania
20 km walk	1:23:29	2008	Eskilstuna, Sweden
50 km walk	3:51:58	2014	Dudince, Slovakia
