= Luis Manuel Corchete =

Spanish athlete

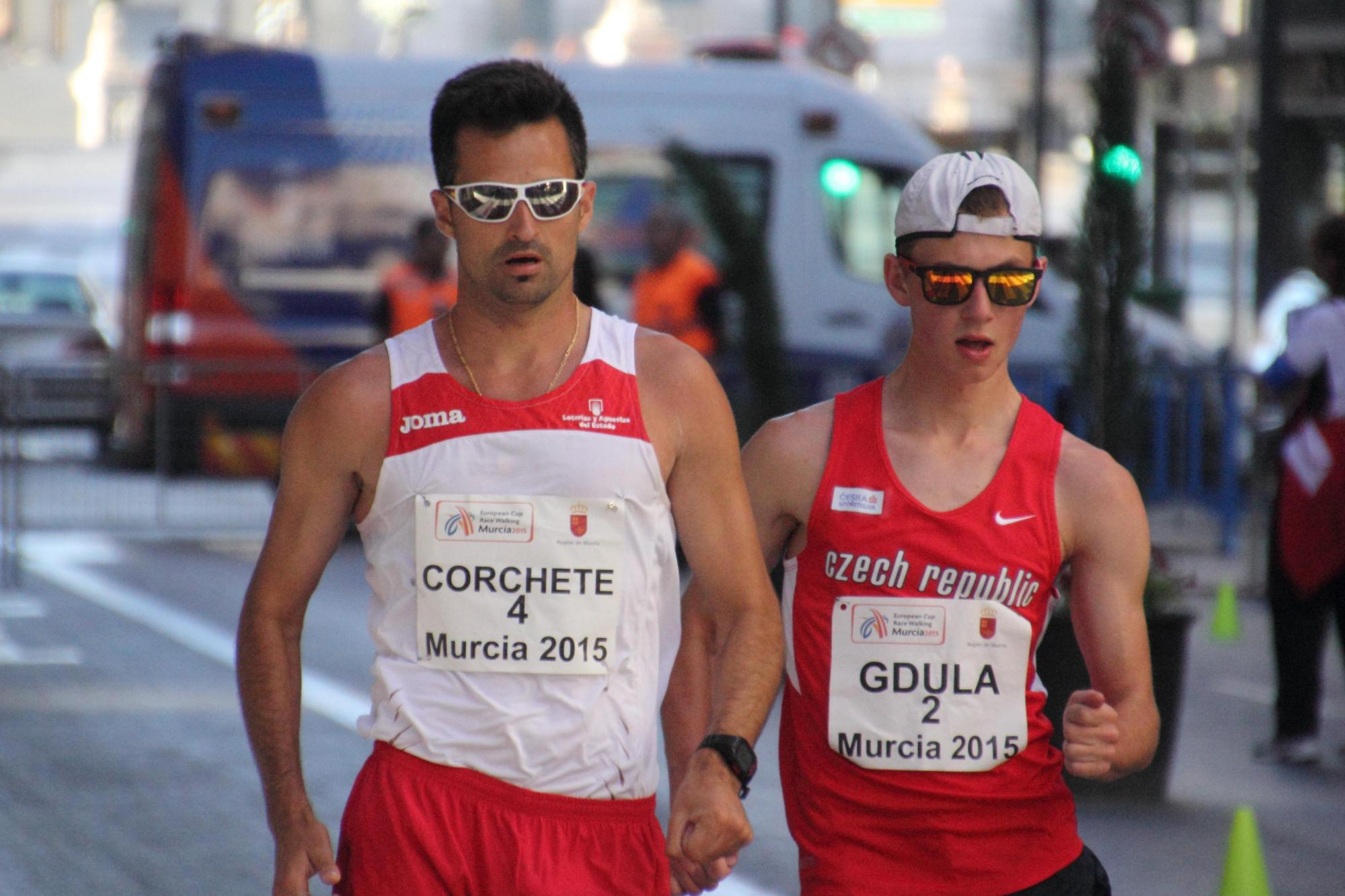
- Corchete (left) in 2015

Personal information
- Full name: Luis Manuel Corchete Martínez
- Nationality: Spanish
- Born: 14 May 1984 (age 41) Alicante, Spain
- Height: 184 cm (6 ft 0 in)
- Weight: 72 kg (159 lb)

Sport
- Sport: Track and field
- Event: Racewalking

Luis Manuel Corchete Martínez (Note: In this Spanish name, the first or paternal surname is Corchete and the second or maternal family name is Martínez.) (born 14 May 1984) is a Spanish athlete who specialises in racewalking. He competed at the 2020 Olympic Games and was the Spanish national champion in 2021 in the 50 km race walk.

== Career ==
He is a member of Torrevieja Athletics club. He had top ten finishes at the 2002 Junior World Championships in Kingston, Jamaica and at the 2003 European Athletics Junior Championships in Tampere, Finland. He was coached by Josep Marín at the Sant Cugat CAR for eight years before switching in 2009, when he began to be coached by Antonio Carillo.

He was set to retire after finishing fifth in the 50,000km race walk at the Spanish Championships in 2020, however during the COVID-19 pandemic that year, he continued to train on a home treadmill and decided to continue. He finished third in the 10,000 metres Spanish Race Walking Championships in September 2020 in Madrid.

In February 2021, he beat his personal best from 2012 by 12 minutes to finish in 3:49:19 and in second place in the race at the Spanish Championships in Seville. However, he was behind Ecuadorian Claudio Villanueva, and therefore he became the Spanish senior national champion for the first time. The time achieved the Olympic minimum standard in the 50 km walk. He made his Olympic debut at the delayed 2020 Olympic Games in Tokyo later that year in August 2021, at the age of 37 years-old, but did not finish the race.

== Personal life ==
Corchete is a native of Torrevieja, where he attended municipal school. His wife is the former international gymnast Jennifer Colino. She later set up and ran a gymnastics club in Torrevieja.
