= Anne-Gaëlle Retout =

French athlete (born 1980)

Personal information
- Born: 15 August 1980 (age 45) Caen, France
- Years active: 2010s
- Height: 164 cm (5 ft 5 in)
- Weight: 50 kg (110 lb)

Sport
- Country: France
- Sport: Athletics
- Event: Race walking

Anne-Gaëlle Retout (born 15 August 1980 in Caen) is a French athlete, who specializes in race walking.

== Biography ==
=== Prize list ===
- French Championships in Athletics :
  - winner of 10 000 m walk 2012
  - winner of the 20 km walk in 2008 and 2010

=== Records ===
Personal Bests
Event	Performance	Location	Date
20 km walk	1:36.21	Podébrady	10 April 2010
