= Olena Shumkina =

Ukrainian racewalker (born 1988)

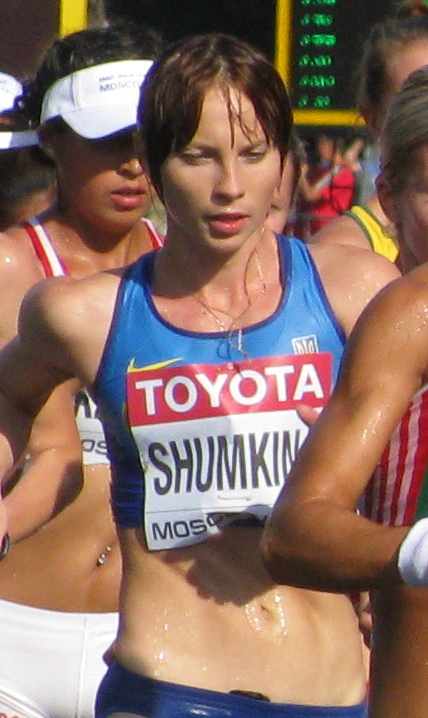
- Shumkina in 2013

Personal information
- Born: 24 January 1988 (age 38) Atyuryevsky District, Mordovia, Russian SFSR
- Height: 160 cm (5 ft 3 in)

Sport
- Sport: Athletics
- Event: Racewalking
Medal record
European Cup
Gold medal – first place	2009 Metz	20 km team

Olena Shumkina (born 24 January 1988 in Atyuryevsky District, Mordovia, Russian SFSR) is a Ukrainian race walker. She competed in the 20 km kilometres event at the 2012 Summer Olympics. She is married to race walker Oleksiy Kazanin. She became a Ukrainian citizen in 2009.
