= Nadiya Borovska =

Ukrainian race walker

Personal information
- Born: 25 February 1981 (age 45)

Sport
- Country: Ukraine
- Sport: Racewalking

Nadiya Borovska (born 25 February 1981 in Zghorany village) is a Ukrainian race walker. She competed in the 20 kilometres event at the 2012 Summer Olympics finishing in 16th place. In 2018, she competed in the women's 20 kilometres walk event at the European Athletics Championships held in Berlin, Germany. She finished in 10th place.

In 2019, she competed in the women's 20 kilometres walk event at the World Athletics Championships held in Doha, Qatar. She finished in 20th place.
