= Sándor Rácz (race walker) =

Hungarian racewalker

Sándor Rácz (born September 14, 1986) is a Hungarian racewalker. He competed at the 2016 Summer Olympics in the men's 50 kilometres walk but did not finish the race.
