= Igor Yerokhin =

Russian racewalker

Personal information
- Native name: Игорь Николаевич Ерохин
- Full name: Igor Nikolayevich Yerokhin
- Born: 4 September 1985 (age 40) Saransk, Russian SFSR, Soviet Union
- Height: 1.66 m (5 ft 5 1/2 in)
- Weight: 56 kg (123 lb)

Sport
- Country: Russia
- Sport: Athletics
- Event: 50km race walk

Igor Nikolayevich Yerokhin or Erokhin (Russian: Игорь Николаевич Ерохин, 4 September 1985 in Saransk) is a Russian former race walker. He was a participant of the 2012 Summer Olympics in London and finished in 5th place in the 50 kilometres walk. In 2011, he placed second at the European Race Walking Cup.

== Career ==
Yerokhin competed at the 2008 Summer Olympics in Beijing but tested positive for prohibited substances and was subsequently disqualified for two years.

In August 2013 the Russian Athletics Federation announced that Yerokhin had received a further ban after abnormal hematological profile indicators were found on his biological passport. He received a life ban and was stripped of all his results since 25 February 2011. This included his 5th-place finish at the 2012 Summer Olympics and his 2nd place at the European Race Walking Cup.

== See also ==
- List of doping cases in athletics
