= Recep Çelik =

Turkish racewalker (born 1983)

Personal information
- Nationality: Turkish
- Born: Recep Çelik; 10 June 1983 (age 43) Diyarbakır, Turkey
- Height: 177 cm (5 ft 10 in)
- Weight: 60 kg (130 lb)

Sport
- Sport: Race walker
- Club: İzmir Büyükşehir Belediyespor
- Coached by: Nikolai Radionov

Achievements and titles
- Personal bests: 10km walk: 40:44; 20000m walk: 1:23:49.9; 20km walk: 1:22:31 NR
Medal record
Tournaments
Gold medal – first place	2011 Bucharest	20km race walk

Recep Çelik (born 10 June 1983 in Diyarbakır, Turkey) is a Turkish racewalker. The 177 cm (5.81 ft) tall athlete weighs 60 kg (130 lb), and is a member of the İzmir Büyükşehir Belediyespor, where he is coached by Nikolai Radionov. He graduated 2004 in physical education and sports from the Vocational College of Aksaray at Niğde University before he studied Regional Public Administration at Anadolu University.

He is the holder of the national records in 10 km walk (road) and 20 km walk (road). Recep Çelik represented Turkey in the 20km race walk event at the 2008 Olympics in Beijing. He is qualified to take part in the same event at the 2012 Olympics in London.

Çelik won the 20km event of the 2011 Balkan Race Walking Championship held on April 9 in Bucharest, Romania, clocking 1:22.31 and setting a new Turkish record.

He qualified for participation in the 20 km walk event at the 2012 Summer Olympics.

== Doping ==
Çelik tested positive for the anabolic steroid Metenolone in May 2012, and was subsequently handed a two-year ban from sports.

== Personal bests ==
According to IAAF database, his personal bests are:

- 10 km walk: 40:44 min (2011)
- 20,000 m walk: 1:23:49.9 hrs (2011)
- 20 km walk: 1:22:31 hrs (2011) NR
