= Laura Polli =

Swiss racewalker

Personal information
- Born: 7 September 1983 (age 43)

Sport
- Country: Switzerland
- Sport: Track and field
- Updated on 29 August 2015

Laura Polli (born 7 September 1983) is a female racewalker from Switzerland. She competed in the women's 20 kilometres walk event at the 2015 World Championships in Athletics in Beijing, China, and finished in the 33rd position.

== See also ==
- Switzerland at the 2015 World Championships in Athletics
