= 2015 European Race Walking Cup =

- Organisers: EAA
- Edition: 11th
- Date: 17 May
- Host city: Murcia, Spain
- Venue: Gran Vía Escultor Salzillo
- Events: 5
- Participation: 207 athletes from 27 nations

The 2015 European Race Walking Cup took place on 17 May 2015. The races were held on a 1 km lap on Gran Vía Escultor Salzillo in Murcia, Spain. Detailed reports of the event were given for the IAAF and for the EAA.

Complete results were published.

Later, Russian athletes Mikhail Ryzhov (winner of 50 km) and Ivan Noskov (runner-up of 50 km event) were disqualified for doping, and the medals were redistubuted.

== Medallists ==
Event	Gold		Silver		Bronze	
Individual
Men's 20 km	Miguel Ángel López; Spain	1:19:52	Matej Tóth; Slovakia	1:20:21	Yohann Diniz; France	1:20:37
Men's 50 km	Marco De Luca; Italy	3:46:21	Ivan Banzeruk; Ukraine		?	
Men's 10 km Junior (U20)	Diego García; Spain	40:38	Jean Blancheteau; France	41:11	Pablo Oliva; Spain	41:19
Women's 20 km	Elmira Alembekova; Russia	1:26:15	Eleonora Giorgi; Italy	1:26:17	Svetlana Vasilyeva; Russia	1:26:31
Women's 10 km Junior (U20)	Klavdiya Afanasyeva; Russia	45:55	Mariya Losinova; Russia	46:11	Mária Pérez; Spain	47:08
Team
Men's 20 km	Germany	32	Russia	35	Ukraine	37
Men's 50 km	Italy		Ukraine		?	
Men's 10 km Junior (U20)	Spain	4	France	11	Germany	17
Women's 20 km	Russia	9	Italy	30	Portugal	38
Women's 10 km Junior (U20)	Russia	3	Spain	9	Italy	12

== Race results ==
=== Men's 20km ===
Individual race
Rank	Athlete	Country	Time	Notes	Red cards
1st place, gold medalist(s)	Miguel Ángel López	Spain	1:19:52		
2nd place, silver medalist(s)	Matej Tóth	Slovakia	1:20:21	SB	
3rd place, bronze medalist(s)	Yohann Diniz	France	1:20:37		>>
4	Dzianis Simanovich	Belarus	1:21:11		~
5	Ihor Hlavan	Ukraine	1:21:24	SB	
6	Andrey Krivov	Russia	1:22:05		
7	Christopher Linke	Germany	1:22:06		
8	Perseus Karlström	Sweden	1:22:44	SB	
9	Denis Strelkov	Russia	1:22:47		~
10	Ato Ibáñez	Sweden	1:22:48	SB	>
11	Giorgio Rubino	Italy	1:22:55		~
12	Hagen Pohle	Germany	1:23:07		
13	Carl Dohmann	Germany	1:23:16		
14	Andriy Kovenko	Ukraine	1:23:21	SB	
15	Alex Wright	Ireland	1:23:35	SB	~~
16	Tom Bosworth	United Kingdom	1:23:54		~
17	Rafał Augustyn	Poland	1:23:59		>
18	Nazar Kovalenko	Ukraine	1:24:03		
19	Erik Tysse	Norway	1:24:34		
20	Pyotr Trofimov	Russia	1:25:22		
21	Miguel Carvalho	Portugal	1:25:40	PB	
22	Luís Alberto Amezcua	Spain	1:25:49		
23	Kevin Campion	France	1:25:50	SB	
24	Jarkko Kinnunen	Finland	1:26:03	SB	
25	Arnis Rumbenieks	Latvia	1:26:32		
26	Veli-Matti Partanen	Finland	1:26:40		
27	Brendan Boyce	Ireland	1:26:47	SB	
28	Anton Kučmín	Slovakia	1:26:53		
29	Francesco Fortunato	Italy	1:27:04		
30	Aleksi Ojala	Finland	1:27:13		
31	Leonardo Dei Tos	Italy	1:27:34		
32	Antonin Boyez	France	1:28:15		
33	Michele Antonelli	Italy	1:28:17		>
34	Álvaro Martín	Spain	1:28:45		
35	Matias Korpela	Finland	1:29:30	PB	>>
36	Rafał Sikora	Poland	1:30:31		>
37	Adrian Dragomir	Romania	1:30:32		
38	Dušan Majdán	Slovakia	1:30:32		
39	Patrik Spevák	Slovakia	1:31:48		
40	Ruslan Dmytrenko	Ukraine	1:32:38		
41	José Ignacio Díaz	Spain	1:32:46		
42	Sahin Senoduncu	Turkey	1:34:06		
43	Bruno Erent	Croatia	1:38:00		
44	Lauri Lelumees	Estonia	1:39:11		>
	Dzmitry Dziubin	Belarus	DNF		>~
	Dietmar Hirschmugl	Austria	DNF		>>
	Serkan Dogan	Turkey	DNF		~
	Genadij Kozlovskij	Lithuania	DNF		
	Recep Çelik	Turkey	DNF		
	Ersin Tacir	Turkey	DNF		
	Sérgio Vieira	Portugal	DNF		
	João Vieira	Portugal	DNF		
	Håvard Haukenes	Norway	DQ	R 230.6a	>>>
	Aleksandr Ivanov	Russia	DQ	R 230.6a	>~~
	Margus Luik	Estonia	DQ	R 230.6a	>>>
	Łukasz Nowak	Poland	DQ	R 230.6a	>>>
	Joakim Sælen	Norway	DQ	R 230.6a	>>>
	Catalin Vasile Suhani	Romania	DQ	R 230.6a	>>>

~ Lost contact
> Bent knee

Teams
Rank	Team	Points
1st place, gold medalist(s)	Germany: Christopher Linke / 7; Hagen Pohle / 12; Carl Dohmann / 13	32
2nd place, silver medalist(s)	Russia: Andrey Krivov / 6; Denis Strelkov / 9; Pyotr Trofimov / 20	35
3rd place, bronze medalist(s)	Ukraine: Ihor Hlavan / 5; Andriy Kovenko / 14; Nazar Kovalenko / 18; (Ruslan Dmytrenko) / (40)	37
4	Spain: Miguel Ángel López / 1; Luís Alberto Amezcua / 22; Álvaro Martín / 34; (José Ignacio Díaz) / (41)	57
5	France: Yohann Diniz / 3; Kevin Campion / 23; Antonin Boyez / 32	58
6	Slovakia: Matej Tóth / 2; Anton Kučmín / 28; Dušan Majdán / 38; (Patrik Spevák) / (39)	68
7	Italy: Giorgio Rubino / 11; Francesco Fortunato / 29; Leonardo Dei Tos / 31; (Michele Antonelli) / (33)	71
8	Finland: Jarkko Kinnunen / 24; Veli-Matti Partanen / 26; Aleksi Ojala / 30; (Matias Korpela) / (35)	80

- Note: Athletes in parentheses did not score for the team result.

=== Men's 50km ===
Individual race
Rank	Athlete	Country	Time	Notes	Red cards
DSQ	Mikhail Ryzhov	Russia	3:43:32		
DSQ	Ivan Noskov	Russia	3:43:57		
1st place, gold medalist(s)	Marco De Luca	Italy	3:46:21		~
2nd place, silver medalist(s)	Ivan Banzeruk	Ukraine	3:49:02		
3rd place, bronze medalist(s)	Roman Yevstifeyev	Russia	3:51:00		~
4	Serhiy Budza	Ukraine	3:51:33		
5	Aléxandros Papamihaíl	Greece	3:51:38		
6	Teodorico Caporaso	Italy	3:51:44	PB	
7	Grzegorz Sudoł	Poland	3:51:48		
8	Benjamín Sánchez	Spain	3:55:45	PB	
9	Marius Cocioran	Romania	3:55:59	PB	
10	Federico Tontodonati	Italy	3:56:09		
11	Ihor Saharuk	Ukraine	3:57:20		
12	Sergey Sharipov	Russia	3:57:40	PB	
13	Martin Tistan	Slovakia	4:02:26	PB	>~
14	Luís Manuel Corchete	Spain	4:02:29		
15	Lorenzo Dessi	Italy	4:02:45	SB	
16	Anders Hansson	Sweden	4:03:20	PB	
17	Pavel Schrom	Czech Republic	4:08:05	SB	>~
18	Eemeli Kiiski	Finland	4:08:36		>>
19	Alex Flórez	Switzerland	4:12:11		~~
20	Xavier Le Coz	France	4:30:34		
	Oleksiy Kazanin	Ukraine	DNF		~
	Pedro Isidro	Portugal	DNF		~
	Pedro Martins	Portugal	DNF		
	Jesús Ángel García	Spain	DQ	R 230.6a	>>>
	Lukáš Gdula	Czech Republic	DQ	R 230.6a	>>>
	Ivan Trotski	Belarus	DQ	R 230.6a	>>>
	Marc Tur	Spain	DQ	R 230.6a	>>>

~ Lost contact
> Bent knee

Teams
Rank	Team	Points
DSQ	Russia: Mikhail Ryzhov / 1; Ivan Noskov / 2; Roman Yevstifeyev / 5; (Sergey Sharipov) / (14)	8
1st place, gold medalist(s)	Italy: Marco De Luca / 3; Teodorico Caporaso / 8; Federico Tontodonati / 12; (Lorenzo Dessi) / (17)	23
2nd place, silver medalist(s)	Ukraine: Ivan Banzeruk / 4; Serhiy Budza / 6; Ihor Saharuk / 13	23

- Note: Athletes in parentheses did not score for the team result.

=== Men's 10km Junior (U20) ===
Individual race
Rank	Athlete	Country	Time	Notes	Red cards
1st place, gold medalist(s)	Diego García	Spain	40:38	SB	
2nd place, silver medalist(s)	Jean Blancheteau	France	41:11	PB	~
3rd place, bronze medalist(s)	Pablo Oliva	Spain	41:19	PB	
4	Miroslav Úradník	Slovakia	41:38	PB	
5	Manuel Bermúdez	Spain	41:49	PB	>
6	Vasiliy Mizinov	Russia	41:57		~
7	Karl Junghannß	Germany	42:07	PB	~~
8	Bence Venyercsán	Hungary	42:07	PB	
9	Thibaut Hypolite	France	42:10	PB	~~
10	Nathaniel Seiler	Germany	42:12	PB	
11	Gregorio Angelini	Italy	42:42	PB	
12	Callum Wilkinson	United Kingdom	42:49	PB	~~
13	Axel Mutter	France	42:54	PB	
14	Aleksey Shevchuk	Russia	43:15		
15	Anatoli Homeleu	Belarus	43:17	PB	
16	Gianluca Picchiottino	Italy	43:26	PB	
17	Guy Thomas	United Kingdom	43:40	PB	>
18	Eduard Zabuzhenko	Ukraine	43:41	PB	
19	Fredrik Vaeng Røtnes	Norway	43:41	PB	
20	Miguel Rodrigues	Portugal	43:47	PB	
21	Muratcan Karapınar	Turkey	43:57		
22	Oleksandr Zholob	Ukraine	43:58	PB	
23	Andrei Gafita	Romania	43:59	PB	
24	Salih Korkmaz	Turkey	44:08	PB	
25	Mustafa Özbek	Turkey	44:18		
26	Kacper Kosecki	Poland	44:27	PB	
27	Arturs Makars	Latvia	44:45	SB	~
28	Michal Morvay	Slovakia	44:55		>
29	Tomas Pagirys	Lithuania	44:58		
30	Andriy Vodvud	Ukraine	45:01	SB	
31	Dzmitry Lukyanchuk	Belarus	45:04		
32	Pedro Amaral	Portugal	45:07	PB	
33	Helder Santos	Portugal	45:15	PB	
34	Stefano Chiesa	Italy	45:53		>>
35	Dominik Cerný	Slovakia	46:33		
36	Tomas Gdula	Czech Republic	46:59	SB	~
37	Igor Jakovlev	Estonia	53:42		
38	Kirill Titov	Estonia	1:01:59		
	Heiner Terp	Germany	DNF		~
	Cameron Corbishley	United Kingdom	DQ	R 230.6a	~~~
	Maksim Krasnov	Russia	DQ	R 230.6a	~~~
	Mateusz Nowak	Poland	DQ	R 230.6a	~~>
	Zaharías Tsamoudákis	Greece	DQ	R 230.6a	~~~

~ Lost contact
> Bent knee

Teams
Rank	Team	Points
1st place, gold medalist(s)	Spain: Diego García / 1; Pablo Oliva / 3; (Manuel Bermúdez) / (5)	4
2nd place, silver medalist(s)	France: Jean Blancheteau / 2; Thibaut Hypolite / 9; (Axel Mutter) / (13)	11
3rd place, bronze medalist(s)	Germany: Karl Junghannß / 7; Nathaniel Seiler / 10	17
4	Russia: Vasiliy Mizinov / 6; Aleksey Shevchuk / 14	20
5	Italy: Gregorio Angelini / 11; Gianluca Picchiottino / 16; (Stefano Chiesa) / (34)	27
6	United Kingdom: Callum Wilkinson / 12; Guy Thomas / 17	29
7	Slovakia: Miroslav Úradník / 4; Michal Morvay / 28; (Dominik Cerný) / (35)	32
8	Ukraine: Eduard Zabuzhenko / 18; Oleksandr Zholob / 22; (Andriy Vodvud) / (30)	40
9	Turkey: Muratcan Karapınar / 21; Salih Korkmaz / 24; (Mustafa Özbek) / (25)	45
10	Belarus: Anatoli Homeleu / 15; Dzmitry Lukyanchuk / 31	46
11	Portugal: Miguel Rodrigues / 20; Pedro Amaral / 32; (Helder Santos) / (33)	52
12	Estonia: Igor Jakovlev / 37; Kirill Titov / 38	75

- Note: Athletes in parentheses did not score for the team result.

=== Women's 20km ===
Individual race
Rank	Athlete	Country	Time	Notes	Red cards
1st place, gold medalist(s)	Elmira Alembekova	Russia	1:26:15	CR	>
2nd place, silver medalist(s)	Eleonora Giorgi	Italy	1:26:17	PB	~~
3rd place, bronze medalist(s)	Svetlana Vasilyeva	Russia	1:26:31		
4	Anežka Drahotová	Czech Republic	1:26:53	PB	
5	Marina Pandakova	Russia	1:26:58		~
6	Vera Sokolova	Russia	1:27:08		~~
7	Lyudmyla Olyanovska	Ukraine	1:27:09	PB	
8	Elisa Rigaudo	Italy	1:28:01	SB	>
9	Ana Cabecinha	Portugal	1:28:28	SB	
10	Laura García-Caro	Spain	1:29:32	PB	~
11	Raquel González	Spain	1:29:34	SB	
12	Neringa Aidietytė	Lithuania	1:30:20	SB	>
13	Vera Santos	Portugal	1:30:30		
14	Brigita Virbalytė-Dimšienė	Lithuania	1:30:37	PB	
15	Nadiya Borovska	Ukraine	1:30:38	SB	~
16	Inês Henriques	Portugal	1:30:44		~~
17	Inna Kashyna	Ukraine	1:30:52	SB	
18	María José Poves	Spain	1:31:16	SB	
19	Susana Feitor	Portugal	1:31:58		
20	Valentina Trapletti	Italy	1:32:08	PB	
21	Emilie Menuet	France	1:32:20	PB	~
22	Paulina Buziak	Poland	1:33:42		>
23	Agnieszka Szwarnóg	Poland	1:33:49		
24	Olena Shumkina	Ukraine	1:33:55	SB	
25	Daryia Balkunets	Belarus	1:34:23		
26	Claudia Ștef	Romania	1:34:31	SB	
27	Lucie Pelantová	Czech Republic	1:34:46	SB	
28	Antigoni Drisbioti	Greece	1:35:00		
29	Corinne Baudoin	France	1:36:08	PB	
30	Andreea Arsine	Romania	1:36:11	PB	
31	Mária Czaková	Slovakia	1:36:42		
32	Agnese Pastare	Latvia	1:37:00	SB	>
33	Laura Polli	Switzerland	1:38:40		
34	Inès Pastorino	France	1:39:33		
35	Federica Ferraro	Italy	1:39:54		>
36	Monika Horňáková	Slovakia	1:43:33		
37	Violaine Averous	France	1:44:04		
38	Jo Atkinson	United Kingdom	1:44:28		~>
39	Alexandra Aichimoaei	Romania	1:50:27		
	Radosveta Simeonova	Bulgaria	DNF		>>
	Mária Gáliková	Slovakia	DNF		
	Agnieszka Dygacz	Poland	DNF		
	Mari Olsson	Sweden	DNF		
	Kristina Saltanovič	Lithuania	DNF		
	Julia Takács	Spain	DQ	R 230.6a	~~~

~ Lost contact
> Bent knee

Teams
Rank	Team	Points
1st place, gold medalist(s)	Russia: Elmira Alembekova / 1; Svetlana Vasilyeva / 3; Marina Pandakova / 5; (Vera Sokolova) / (6)	9
2nd place, silver medalist(s)	Italy: Eleonora Giorgi / 2; Elisa Rigaudo / 8; Valentina Trapletti / 20; (Federica Ferraro) / (35)	30
3rd place, bronze medalist(s)	Portugal: Ana Cabecinha / 9; Vera Santos / 13; Inês Henriques / 16; (Susana Feitor) / (19)	38
4	Ukraine: Lyudmyla Olyanovska / 7; Nadiya Borovska / 15; Inna Kashyna / 17; (Olena Shumkina) / (24)	39
5	Spain: Laura García-Caro / 10; Raquel González / 11; María José Poves / 18	39
6	France: Emilie Menuet / 21; Corinne Baudoin / 29; Inès Pastorino / 34; (Violaine Averous) / (37)	84
7	Romania: Claudia Ștef / 26; Andreea Arsine / 30; Alexandra Aichimoaei / 39	95

- Note: Athletes in parentheses did not score for the team result.

=== Women's 10km Junior (U20) ===
Individual race
Rank	Athlete	Country	Time	Notes	Red cards
1st place, gold medalist(s)	Klavdiya Afanasyeva	Russia	45:55		
2nd place, silver medalist(s)	Mariya Losinova	Russia	46:11		
3rd place, bronze medalist(s)	Mária Pérez	Spain	47:08	SB	~
4	Noemi Stella	Italy	47:19		
5	Katarzyna Zdzieblo	Poland	47:52		
6	Lidia Sánchez-Puebla	Spain	48:01		
7	Živilė Vaiciukevičiūtė	Lithuania	48:20		~~
8	Eleonora Dominici	Italy	48:46		
9	Monika Vaiciukevičiūtė	Lithuania	49:10	SB	
10	Irene Vazquez	Spain	49:14		
11	Anastasiya Rarouskaya	Belarus	49:29		
12	Hanna Suslyk	Ukraine	49:49		~
13	Angelika Augustyn	Poland	49:53	PB	
14	Edna Barros	Portugal	49:58		
15	Catarina Marques	Portugal	50:01	PB	
16	Giada Francesca Ciabini	Italy	50:38	PB	
17	Emilia Lehmeyer	Germany	51:01		
18	Carmen Bianca Molnar	Romania	52:00		>
19	Yuliya Balkouskaya	Belarus	52:19		
20	Axelle Ham	France	52:20		
21	Henrika Parviainen	Finland	52:42		
22	Annika Brembach	Germany	52:45		
23	Ivanna Danylyuk	Ukraine	53:16		
24	Emma Achurch	United Kingdom	53:35		>>
25	Teresa Zurek	Germany	53:47		
26	Kseniya Byelova	Ukraine	55:17		>
27	Margarita Kozlova	Estonia	1:08:16		
	Tereza Korvasová	Czech Republic	DNF		>
	Lika Mitrofanova	Estonia	DNF		>
	Rita Récsei	Hungary	DQ	R 230.6a	~~~
	Olga Shargina	Russia	DQ	R 230.6a	~>>
	Lena Ungerböck	Austria	DQ	R 230.6a	>>>

~ Lost contact
> Bent knee

Teams
Rank	Team	Points
1st place, gold medalist(s)	Russia: Klavdiya Afanasyeva / 1; Mariya Losinova / 2	3
2nd place, silver medalist(s)	Spain: Mária Pérez / 3; Lidia Sánchez-Puebla / 6; (Irene Vazquez) / (10)	9
3rd place, bronze medalist(s)	Italy: Noemi Stella / 4; Eleonora Dominici / 8; (Giada Francesca Ciabini) / (16)	12
4	Lithuania: Živilė Vaiciukevičiūtė / 7; Monika Vaiciukevičiūtė / 9	16
5	Poland: Katarzyna Zdzieblo / 5; Angelika Augustyn / 13	18
6	Portugal: Edna Barros / 14; Catarina Marques / 15	29
7	Belarus: Anastasiya Rarouskaya / 11; Yuliya Balkouskaya / 19	30
8	Ukraine: Hanna Suslyk / 12; Ivanna Danylyuk / 23; (Kseniya Byelova) / (26)	35
9	Germany: Emilia Lehmeyer / 17; Annika Brembach / 22; (Teresa Zurek) / (25)	39

- Note: Athletes in parentheses did not score for the team result.

== Medal table (unofficial) ==
The host country is highlighted in lavender blue

Rank	Nation	Gold	Silver	Bronze	Total
1	Russia	6	3	1	10
2	Spain*	3	1	2	6
3	Germany	1	0	1	2
4	Italy	0	3	2	5
5	France	0	2	1	3
6	Slovakia	0	1	0	1
7	Ukraine	0	0	2	2
8	Portugal	0	0	1	1
Totals (8 entries)		10	10	10	30

- Note: Totals include both individual and team medals, with medals in the team competition counting as one medal.

== Participation ==
According to an unofficial count, 207 athletes from 27 countries participated.

- Austria (2)
- Belarus (8)
- Bulgaria (1)
- Croatia (1)
- Czech Republic (6)
- Estonia (6)
- Finland (6)
- France (12)
- Germany (9)
- Greece (3)
- Hungary (2)
- Ireland (2)
- Italy (18)
- Latvia (3)
- Lithuania (7)
- Norway (4)
- Poland (11)
- Portugal (14)
- Romania (8)
- Russia (18)
- Slovakia (11)
- Spain (18)
- Sweden (4)
- Switzerland (2)
- Turkey (7)
- Ukraine (18)
- United Kingdom (6)

== Videos ==
- Video impression of the Murcia 2015 European Cup Race Walking
- Interview: Miguel Angel Lopez 20km men Race Walking
- Interview: Matej Toth 20km men Race Walking
- Interview: Yohan Diniz 20km men Race Walking
- Interview: Marco de Luca 50km Men Race Walking
- Interview: Eleonora Giorgi 20km Women Race Walking
- Interview: Anezka Drahotova 20km Women Race Walking
- Interview: Diego Garcia 10km Junior Men Race Walking
- Interview: Pablo Oliva 10km Junior Men Race Walking
- Interview: Callum Wilkinson 10km Junior Men Race Walking
- Interview: Maria Perez 10km women junior Race Walking
