= 2022 European Athletics Championships – Men's 35 kilometres walk =

Men's 35 kilometres walk at the 2022 European Athletics Championships
- Location: Munich
- Dates: August 16
- Competitors: 26 from 15 nations
- Winning result: 2:26:49

Medalists
gold medal	Miguel Ángel López	Spain
silver medal	Christopher Linke	Germany
bronze medal	Matteo Giupponi	Italy

The men's 35 kilometres race walk at the 2022 European Athletics Championships took place at the streets of Munich on 16 August.

== Records ==
Standing records prior to the 2022 European Athletics Championships
World record	world records will be recognised after 1 January 2023			
European record	Massimo Stano (ITA)	2:23:14	Eugene, United States	24 July 2022
Championship record	new event			
World Leading	Massimo Stano (ITA)	2:23:14	Eugene, United States	24 July 2022
Europe Leading	Massimo Stano (ITA)	2:23:14	Eugene, United States	24 July 2022

== Schedule ==
Date	Time	Round
16 August 2022	8:30	Final

All times are local times (UTC+2)

== Results ==
The start on 8:30.

Rank	Name	Nationality	Time	Note
1st place, gold medalist(s)	Miguel Ángel López	Spain	2:26:49	CR
2nd place, silver medalist(s)	Christopher Linke	Germany	2:29:30	PB
3rd place, bronze medalist(s)	Matteo Giupponi	Italy	2:30:34	PB
4	Manuel Bermúdez	Spain	2:32:31	
5	Jonathan Hilbert	Germany	2:32:44	PB
6	Miroslav Úradník	Slovakia	2:35:44	
7	Michal Morvay	Slovakia	2:36:04	
8	Carl Dohmann	Germany	2:36:52	
9	Vít Hlaváč	Czech Republic	2:37:32	
10	Brendan Boyce	Ireland	2:38:03	
11	Maryan Zakalnytskyy	Ukraine	2:39:06	SB
12	Aleksi Ojala	Finland	2:39:06	
13	Ivan Banzeruk	Ukraine	2:39:34	SB
14	Bence Venyercsán	Hungary	2:41:07	SB
15	Anton Radko	Ukraine	2:43:10	SB
16	Narcis Mihăilă	Romania	2:45:03	
17	Arturas Mastianica	Lithuania	2:46:09	
	Alexandros Papamichail	Greece	DNF	
	Marius Cocioran	Romania	DNF	
	Perseus Karlström	Sweden	DNF	
	Artur Brzozowski	Poland	DNF	
	Michele Antonelli	Italy	DSQ	TR54.7.5
	Lukáš Gdula	Czech Republic	DSQ	TR54.7.5
	Máté Helebrandt	Hungary	DSQ	TR54.7.5
	Aurélien Quinion	France	DSQ	TR54.7.5
	Marc Tur	Spain	DSQ	TR54.7.5
	Teodorico Caporaso	Italy	DNS	
