= 2014 European Athletics Championships – Men's 50 kilometres walk =

Men's 50 kilometres walk at the European Athletics Championships

The men's 50 kilometres race walk at the 2014 European Athletics Championships took place at the Letzigrund, Zürich, Switzerland on 15 August.

== Medalists ==
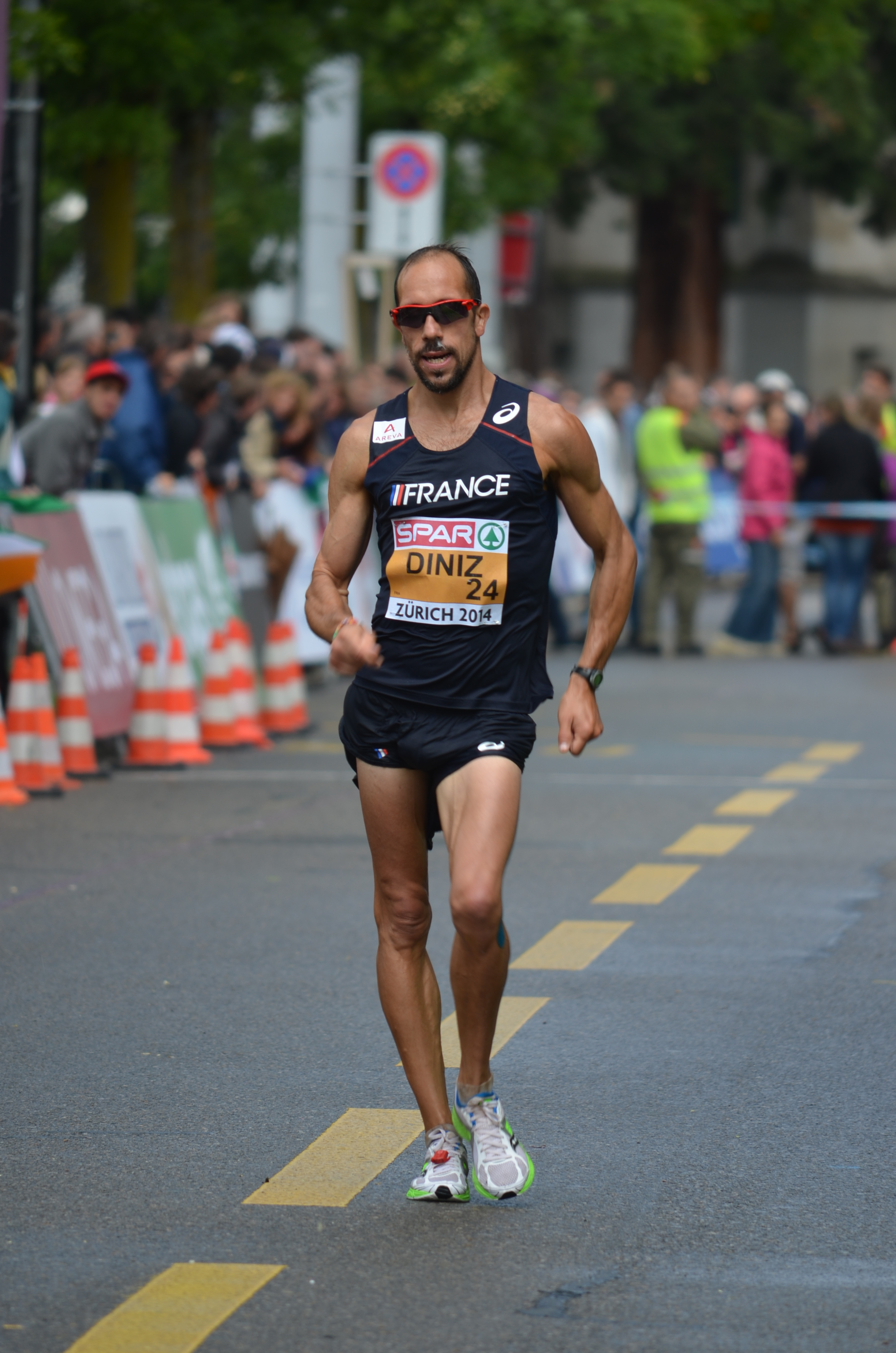
Winner Yohann Diniz

Gold	Yohann Diniz; France
Silver	Matej Tóth; Slovakia
Bronze	Ivan Noskov; Russia

== Records ==
Standing records prior to the 2014 European Athletics Championships
World record	Denis Nizhegorodov (RUS)	3:34:14	Cheboksary, Russia	11 May 2008
European record	Denis Nizhegorodov (RUS)	3:34:14	Cheboksary, Russia	11 May 2008
Championship record	Robert Korzeniowski (POL)	3:36:39	Munich, Germany	8 August 2002
World Leading	Mikhail Ryzhov (RUS)	3:39:05	Taicang, China	3 May 2014
European Leading	Mikhail Ryzhov (RUS)	3:39:05	Taicang, China	3 May 2014
Broken records during the 2014 European Athletics Championships
World record European record Championship record World Leading; European Leading	Yohann Diniz (FRA)	3:32:33	Zürich, Switzerland	15 August 2014

== Schedule ==
Date	Time	Round
15 August 2014	09:00	Final

All times are local times (UTC+2)

== Results ==
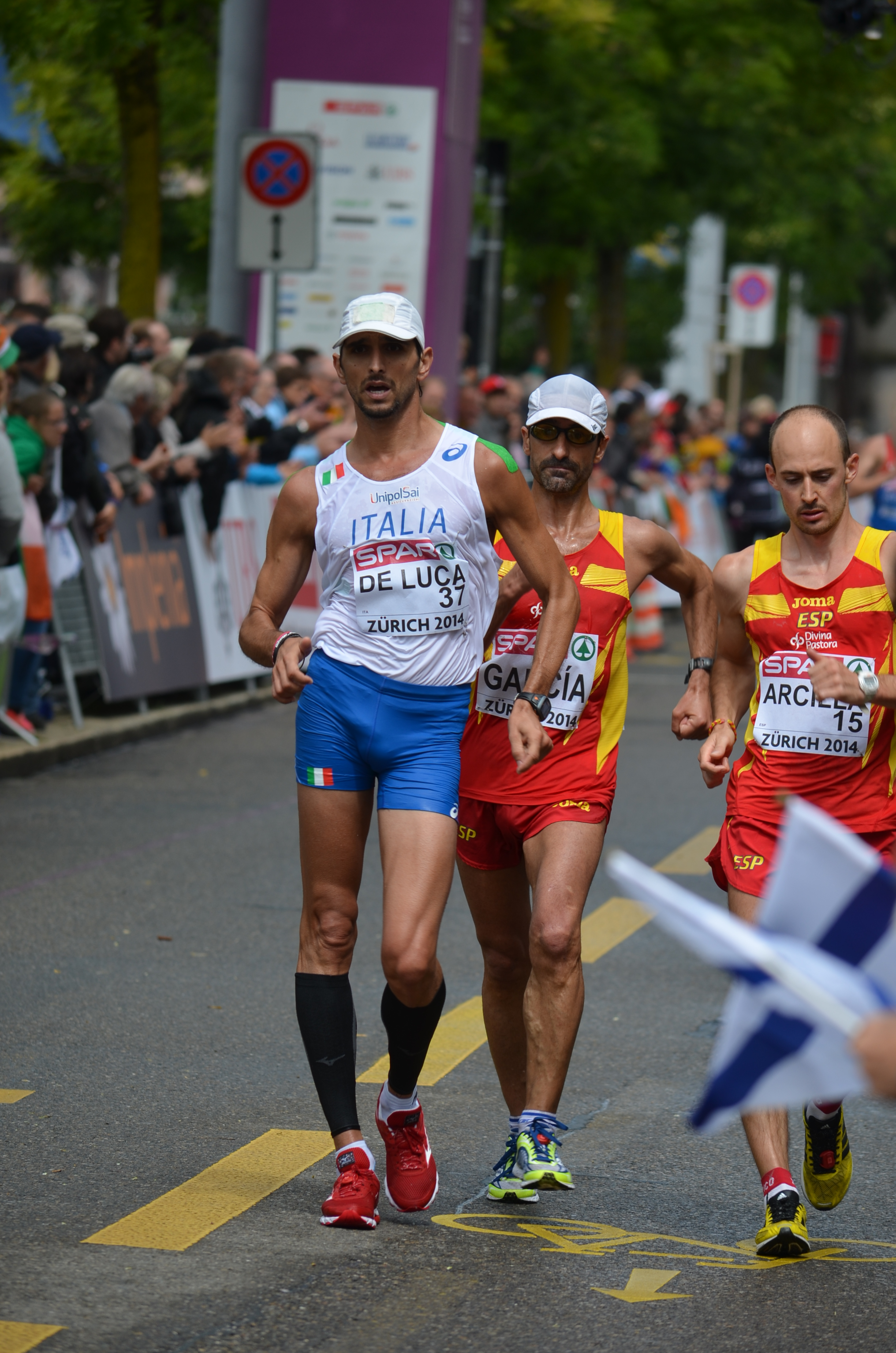
Picture of the race

=== Final ===
Rank	Athlete	Nationality	Time	Notes
1st place, gold medalist(s)	Yohann Diniz	France	3:32:33	WR
2nd place, silver medalist(s)	Matej Tóth	Slovakia	3:36:21	NR
3rd place, bronze medalist(s)	Ivan Noskov	Russia	3:37:41	PB
4	Mikhail Ryzhov	Russia	3:39:07	
5	Ivan Banzeruk	Ukraine	3:44:49	PB
6	Ihor Hlavan	Ukraine	3:45:08	
7	Marco De Luca	Italy	3:45:25	PB
8	Jesús Ángel García	Spain	3:45:41	SB
9	Rafał Augustyn	Poland	3:48:15	
10	Ato Ibáñez	Sweden	3:48:42	PB
11	Jarkko Kinnunen	Finland	3:48:49	
12	Oleksiy Kazanin	Ukraine	3:49:00	
13	Alexandros Papamichail	Greece	3:49:58	
14	Aleksandr Yargunkin	Russia	3:50:39	
15	Carl Dohmann	Germany	3:51:27	PB
16	Brendan Boyce	Ireland	3:51:34	PB
17	Tadas Šuškevičius	Lithuania	3:52:39	
18	Veli-Matti Partanen	Finland	3:52:58	PB
19	Dušan Majdán	Slovakia	3:53:26	PB
20	Teodorico Caporaso	Italy	3:58:23	SB
21	Francisco Arcilla	Spain	4:00:57	
22	Jean-Jacques Nkouloukidi	Italy	4:01:12	
23	Marius Cocioran	Romania	4:03:25	
24	Martin Tistan	Slovakia	4:06:11	PB
25	Pedro Isidro	Portugal	4:07:44	
26	Lukáš Gdula	Czech Republic	4:08:51	
	Robert Heffernan	Ireland	DNF	
	Łukasz Nowak	Poland	DNF	
	Ivan Trotski	Belarus	DNF	
	Grzegorz Sudoł	Poland	DNF	
	Ričardas Rekst	Lithuania	DNF	
	Andreas Gustafsson	Sweden	DSQ	
	Maciej Rosiewicz	Georgia	DSQ	
	Pavel Schrom	Czech Republic	DSQ	
	Perseus Karlström	Sweden	DNS	
