= 2013 World Championships in Athletics – Men's 50 kilometres walk =

Men's 50 kilometres walk at the 2013 World Championships
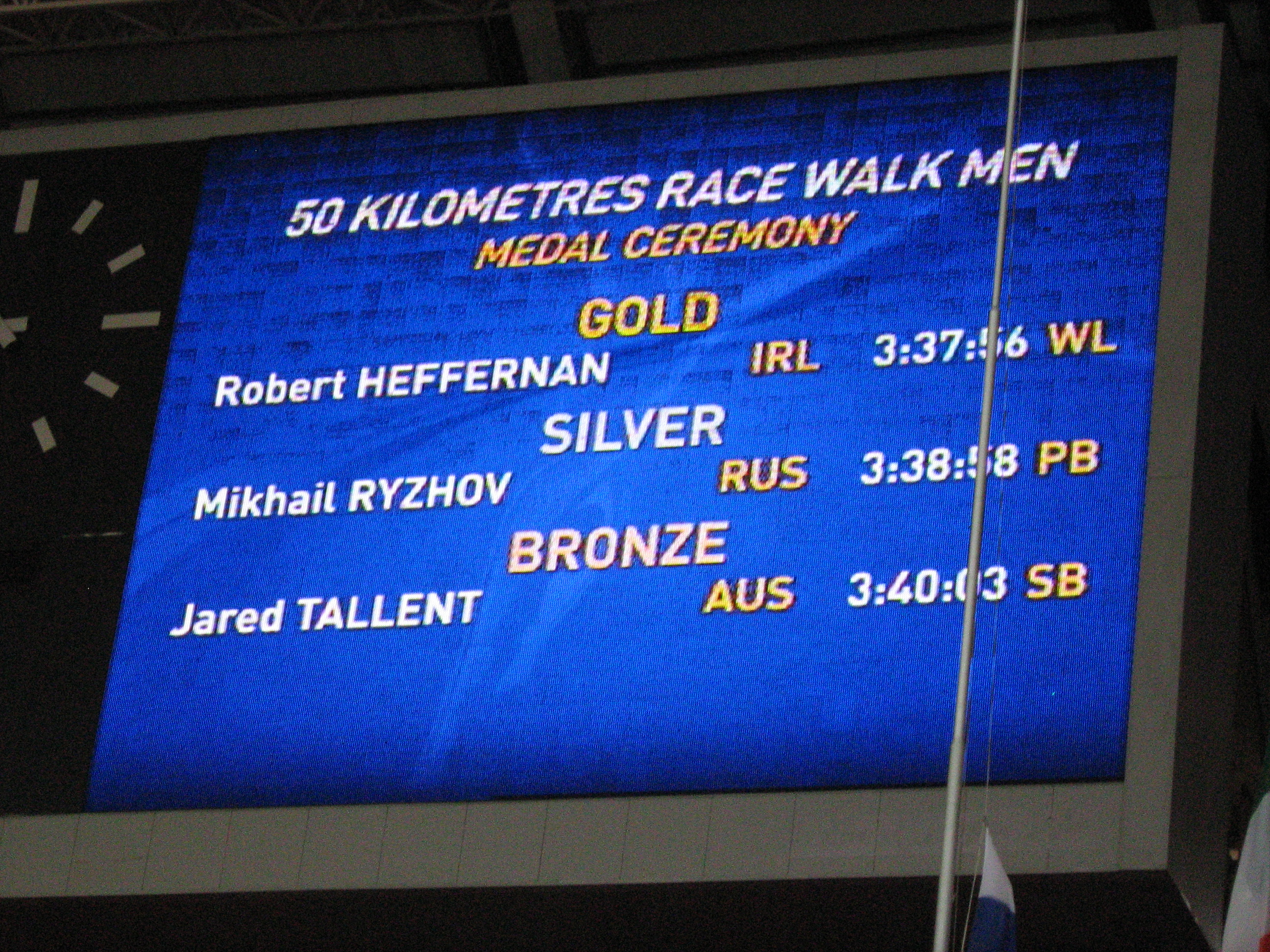
- Venue: Luzhniki Stadium
- Dates: 14 August (final)
- Competitors: 60 from 34 nations
- Winning time: 3:37:56

Medalists
gold medal	Robert Heffernan; Ireland
silver medal	Jared Tallent; Australia
bronze medal	Ihor Hlavan; Ukraine

Official Video

The men's 50 kilometres walk at the 2013 World Championships in Athletics was held at the Luzhniki Stadium and Moscow streets on 14 August.

From the start on home soil, Russians Mikhail Ryzhov and Ivan Noskov took the lead, with Jared Tallent in tow. By 15K the three had broken away to a 12-second lead. Tallent began to fall back to lead a large chasing pack as the two men continued to set the pace. By the half way mark Grzegorz Sudol and Robert Heffernan, who had spotted the leaders 30 seconds earlier, joined world leader Yohann Diniz to form a 5-man pack at the front. By 35K roles had reversed, Heffernan was now leading the Russians, Diniz was exiting the back and Sudol was trying to hold on. Over the next 5K, Heffernan pushed the lead with Ryzhov, as Noskov and Sudol formed their own group now steadily losing ground. Meanwhile, Tallent continued to hang around, leading the chase pack then leaving them behind to do a one-man chase of the leaders. Heffernan finally broke Ryzhov and pushed his way to almost a minute victory. Tallent continued his pace to finish third. After giving up minutes to the leaders, Ihor Hlavan put in an impressive 21:38 final 5K to chase Tallent.

== Records ==
Prior to the competition, the records were as follows:

World record	Denis Nizhegorodov (RUS)	3:34:14	Cheboksary, Russia	11 May 2008
Championship record	Robert Korzeniowski (POL)	3:36:03	Saint-Denis, France	23 August 2003
World Leading	Yohann Diniz (FRA)	3:41:07	Dudince, Slovakia	19 May 2013
African Record	Marc Mundell (RSA)	3:55:32	London, Great Britain	11 August 2012
Asian Record	Yu Chaohong (CHN)	3:36:06	Nanjing, People's Republic of China	22 October 2005
North, Central American and Caribbean record	Érick Barrondo (GUA)	3:41:09	Dudince, Slovakia	23 March 2013
South American Record	Andrés Chocho (ECU)	3:49:26	Valley Cottage, United States	28 October 2012
European Record	Denis Nizhegorodov (RUS)	3:34:14	Cheboksary, Russia	11 May 2008
Oceanian record	Nathan Deakes (AUS)	3:35:47	Geelong, Australia	2 December 2006

== Qualification standards ==
A standard	B standard
4:02:00	4:16:00

== Schedule ==
Date	Time	Round
14 August 2013	08:30	Final

All times are local times (UTC+4)

== Results ==
KEY:	NR	National record	PB	Personal best	SB	Seasonal best

=== Final ===
The final was held at 08:30.

Rank	Name	Nationality	Time	Notes
1st place, gold medalist(s)	Robert Heffernan	Ireland	3:37:56	WL
DSQ	Mikhail Ryzhov	Russia	3:38:58	PB
2nd place, silver medalist(s)	Jared Tallent	Australia	3:40:03	SB
3rd place, bronze medalist(s)	Ihor Hlavan	Ukraine	3:40:39	PB
5	Matej Tóth	Slovakia	3:41:07	SB
6	Grzegorz Sudoł	Poland	3:41:20	PB
7	Ivan Noskov	Russia	3:41:36	PB
8	Łukasz Nowak	Poland	3:43:38	SB
9	Takayuki Tanii	Japan	3:44:26	
10	Yohann Diniz	France	3:45:18	
11	Hirooki Arai	Japan	3:45:56	PB
12	Jesús Ángel García	Spain	3:46:44	SB
13	Serhiy Budza	Ukraine	3:47:36	PB
14	Ivan Trotski	Belarus	3:47:52	SB
15	Marco De Luca	Italy	3:48:05	SB
16	Chris Erickson	Australia	3:49:41	PB
17	Quentin Rew	New Zealand	3:50:27	PB
18	Claudio Villanueva	Spain	3:50:29	PB
19	Omar Zepeda	Mexico	3:50:43	SB
20	Jarkko Kinnunen	Finland	3:50:56	SB
21	Adrian Błocki	Poland	3:51:00	
22	Ato Ibáñez	Sweden	3:53:38	PB
23	Kōichirō Morioka	Japan	3:53:54	
24	Jean-Jacques Nkouloukidi	Italy	3:54:00	SB
25	Brendan Boyce	Ireland	3:54:24	PB
26	Li Jianbo	China	3:56:13	
27	Jonnathan Caceres	Ecuador	3:56:58	
28	Pedro Isidro	Portugal	3:57:30	
29	Dušan Majdán	Slovakia	3:57:50	PB
30	Xu Faguang	China	3:57:54	SB
31	Marc Mundell	South Africa	3:57:55	SB
32	Horacio Nava	Mexico	3:58:09	
33	Basanta Bahadur Rana	India	3:58:20	SB
34	José Ignacio Díaz	Spain	3:58:26	
35	Omar Segura	Mexico	3:58:34	
36	Evan Dunfee	Canada	3:59:28	PB
37	Oh Se-Han	South Korea	4:01:00	
38	Tadas Šuškevičius	Lithuania	4:01:29	
39	Andreas Gustafsson	Sweden	4:01:40	SB
40	Marius Cocioran	Romania	4:04:23	SB
41	Veli-Matti Partanen	Finland	4:04:59	
42	Teodorico Caporaso	Italy	4:05:25	
43	Mário dos Santos	Brazil	4:06:12	SB
44	Xavier Moreno	Ecuador	4:07:29	SB
45	Sándor Rácz	Hungary	4:12:18	
46	John Nunn	United States	4:34:55	SB
	Ian Rayson	Australia	DQ	R 230.6
	Edward Araya	Chile	DQ	R 230.6
	Andrés Chocho	Ecuador	DQ	R 230.6
	Emerson Esnal Hernández	El Salvador	DQ	R 230.6
	Sandeep Kumar	India	DQ	R 230.6
	Yim Jung-hyun	South Korea	DQ	R 230.6
	Håvard Haukenes	Norway	DQ	R 230.6
	Ivan Banzeruk	Ukraine	DQ	R 230.6
	Si Tianfeng	China	DNF	
	Fredy Hernández	Colombia	DNF	
	Maciej Rosiewicz	Georgia	DNF	
	Erik Tysse	Norway	DNF	
	Predrag Filipović	Serbia	DNF	
	Yerenman Salazar	Venezuela	DNF	
	Alexandros Papamichail	Greece	DNS	
