= 2010 European Athletics Championships – Men's 50 kilometres walk =

Athletics Championships for men's on the street of Barcelona

Men's 50 kilometres walk at the European Athletics Championships

The men's 50 kilometres walk at the 2010 European Athletics Championships was held on the streets of Barcelona on 30 July.

== Medalists ==
Gold	Yohann Diniz; France (FRA)
Silver	Grzegorz Sudoł; Poland (POL)
Bronze	Sergey Bakulin; Russia (RUS)

== Records ==
Standing records prior to the 2010 European Athletics Championships
World record	Denis Nizhegorodov (RUS)	3:34:14	Cheboksary, Russia	11 May 2008
European record	Denis Nizhegorodov (RUS)	3:34:14	Cheboksary, Russia	11 May 2008
Championship record	Robert Korzeniowski (POL)	3:36:39	Munich, Germany	8 August 2002
World Leading	Yuki Yamazaki (JPN)	3:46:56	Wajima, Japan	18 April 2010
European Leading	Rafał Augustyn (POL)	3:49:54	Dudince, Slovakia	27 March 2010
Broken records during the 2010 European Athletics Championships
World Leading	Yohann Diniz (FRA)	3:40:37	Barcelona, Spain	30 July 2010
European Leading	Yohann Diniz (FRA)	3:40:37	Barcelona, Spain	30 July 2010

== Schedule ==
Date	Time	Round
30 July 2010	7:35	Final

== Results ==
=== Final ===
Rank	Athlete	Nationality	Time	Notes
1st place, gold medalist(s)	Yohann Diniz	France	3:40:37	EL
2nd place, silver medalist(s)	Grzegorz Sudoł	Poland	3:42:24	PB
3rd place, bronze medalist(s)	Sergey Bakulin	Russia	3:43:26	PB
4	Robert Heffernan	Ireland	3:45:30	NR
5	Jesús Ángel García	Spain	3:47:56	SB
6	Marco de Luca	Italy	3:48:36	SB
7	André Höhne	Germany	3:49:29	
8	Łukasz Nowak	Poland	3:51:31	
9	Tadas Šuškevičius	Lithuania	3:52:31	PB
10	Yuriy Andronov	Russia	3:54:22	SB
11	Colin Griffin	Ireland	3:57:58	SB
12	Andreas Gustafsson	Sweden	3:58:02	
13	Dušan Majdán	Slovakia	4:00:51	PB
14	Augusto Cardoso	Portugal	4:03:40	
15	Predrag Filipovic	Serbia	4:06:29	
	Donatas Škarnulis	Lithuania	DQ	
	Sergey Kirdyapkin	Russia	DNF	Doping
	Trond Nymark	Norway	DNF	
	Andriy Kovenko	Ukraine	DNF	
	Alex Schwazer	Italy	DNF	
	Serhiy Budza	Ukraine	DNF	
	Artur Brzozowski	Poland	DNF	
	Christopher Linke	Germany	DNF	
	António Pereira	Portugal	DNF	
	Jarkko Kinnunen	Finland	DNF	
	Miloš Bátovský	Slovakia	DNF	
	Mikel Odriozola	Spain	DNF	
