= Pedro Isidro =

Portuguese race walker

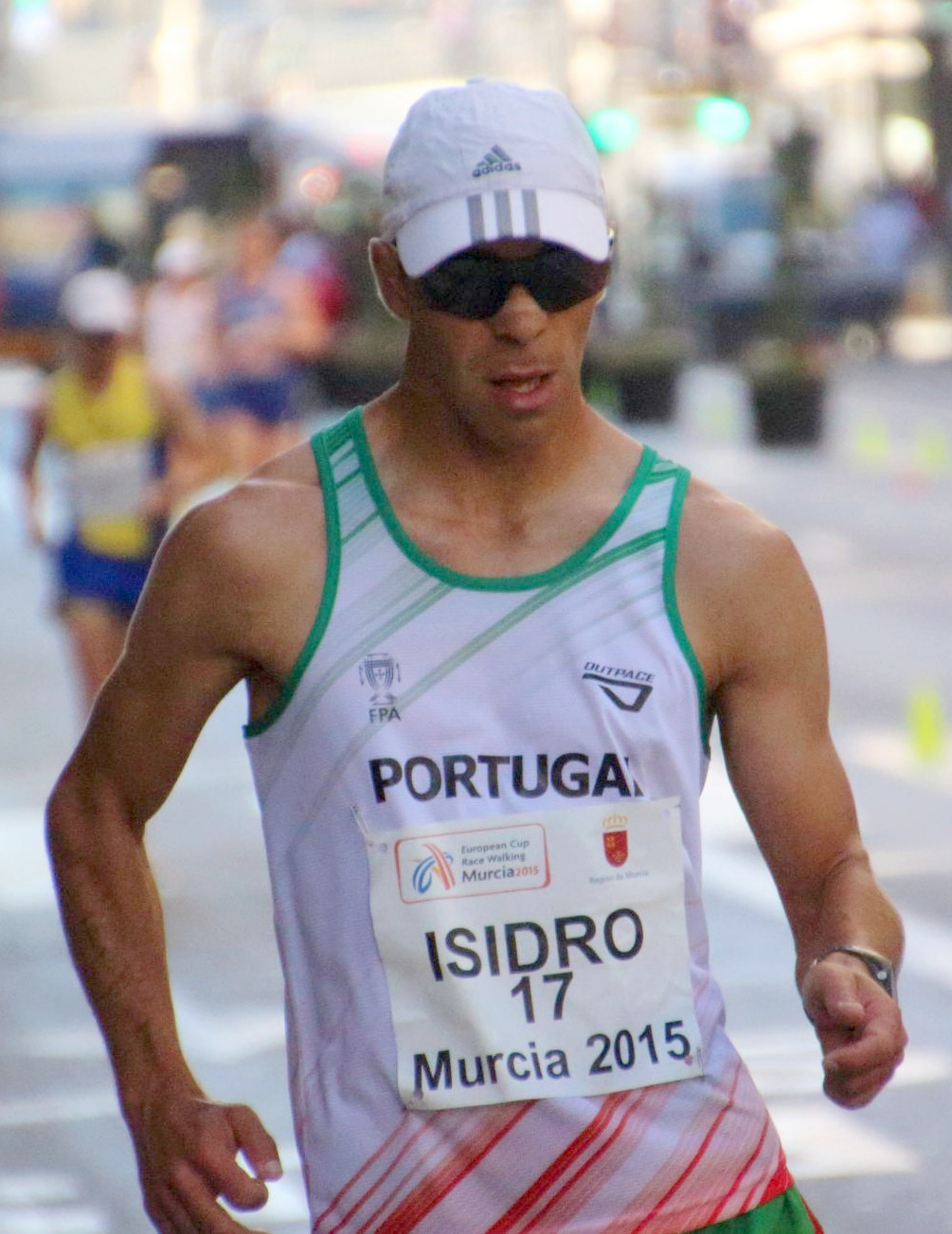
- Isidro at the 2015 European Cup Race Walking

Personal information
- Full name: Pedro Isidro
- Born: 17 July 1985 (age 40) Azambuja, Portugal
- Height: 175 cm (5 ft 9 in)
- Weight: 58 kg (128 lb)

Sport
- Country: Portugal
- Sport: Athletics
- Events: 20 km, 50 km race walk
- Club: Benfica

Achievements and titles
- Personal bests: 20 km – 1:24:53 (2015); 50 km – 3:55:44 (2015)

Pedro Isidro (born 17 July 1985) is a Portuguese race walker. He competed in the 50 km event at the 2012 and 2016 Olympics and finished 39th and 33rd, respectively.

== Competition record ==
Year	Competition	Venue	Position	Event	Notes
Representing Portugal
2008	World Race Walking Cup	Cheboksary, Russia	50th	20 km walk	1:25:22
2009	European Race Walking Cup	Metz, France	20th	20 km walk	1:31:54
2010	World Race Walking Cup	Chihuahua, Mexico	30th	20 km walk	1:27:55
2010	Ibero-American Championships	San Fernando, Spain	3rd	20,000 m walk	1:25:54.7
2011	European Race Walking Cup	Olhão, Portugal	14th	20 km walk	1:27:39
2012	World Race Walking Cup	Saransk, Russia	26th	50 km walk	3:58:00
2012	Olympic Games	London, United Kingdom	39th	50 km walk	3:58:59
2013	European Race Walking Cup	Dudince, Slovakia	17th	50 km walk	3:57:09
2013	World Championships	Moscow, Russia	28th	50 km walk	3:57:30
2014	World Race Walking Cup	Taicang, China	22nd	50 km walk	3:56:15
2014	European Championships	Zurich, Switzerland	25th	50 km walk	4:07:44
2015	European Race Walking Cup	Murcia, Spain	—	50 km walk	DNF
2015	World Championships	Beijing, China	21st	50 km walk	3:55:44
