= Mikhail Ryzhov (race walker) =

Russian racewalker

Mikhail Mikhailovich Ryzhov (Russian: Михаил Михайлович Рыжов; born 17 December 1991) is a Russian race walker. He won the silver medal in the 50 kilometres walk event at the 2013 World Championships in Athletics in Moscow, Russia, but was disqualified for doping in 2015.

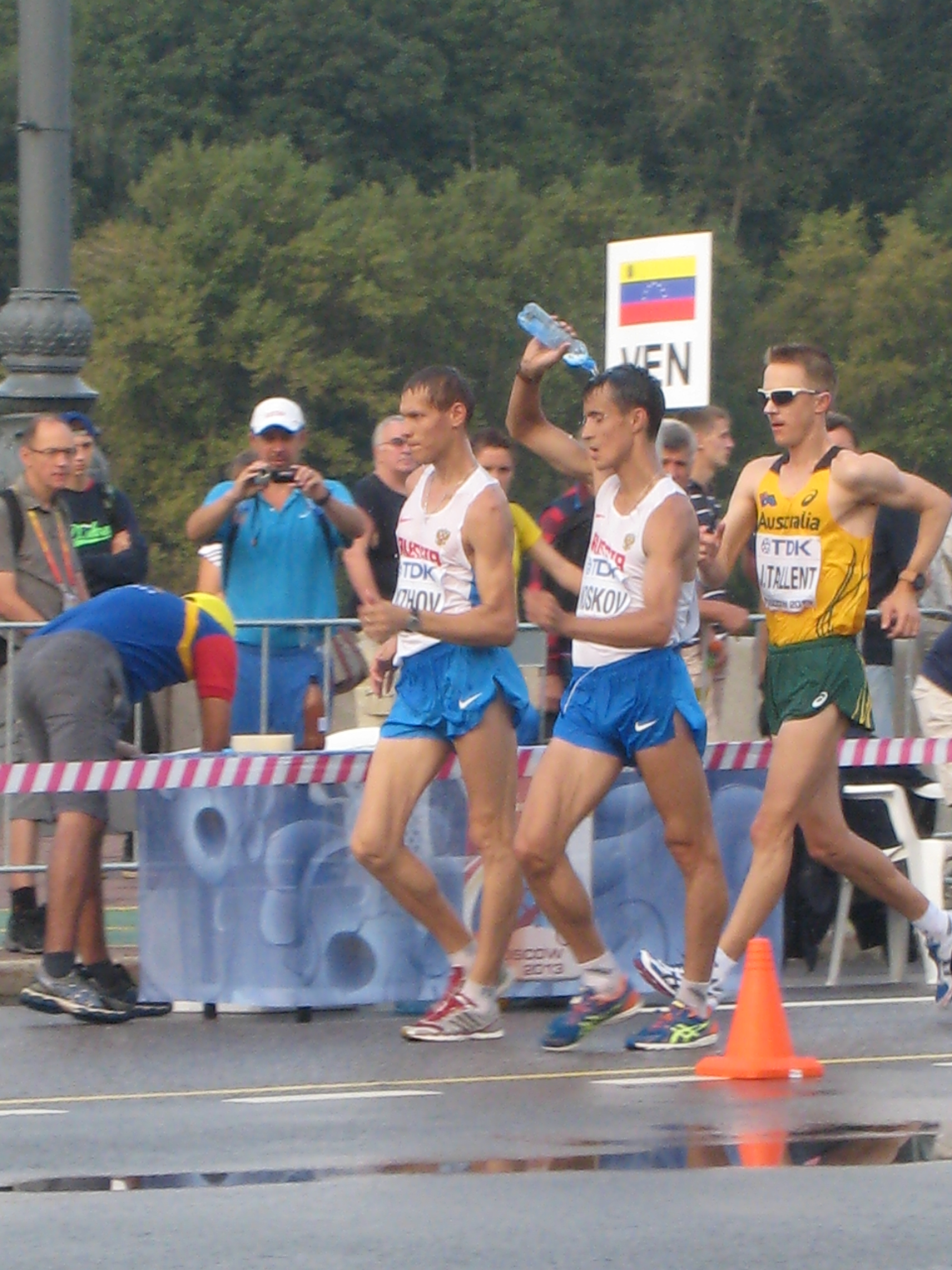
Noskov, Ryzhov and Tallent at 50 km walk race in Moscow

== Doping case ==
In September 2015 IAAF confirmed that Ryshov was provisionally suspended after a sample from an out-of-competition control in Saransk in June had been found positive for a prohibited substance.

== Competition record ==
Year	Competition	Venue	Position	Event	Notes
Representing Russia
2011	Universiade	Shenzhen, China	2nd	20 km	1:24:26
2012	World Race Walking Cup	Saransk, Russia	17th	50 km	3:53:49
2013	European Race Walking Cup	Dudince, Slovakia	2nd	50 km	3:44:41
2013	European Race Walking Cup	Dudince, Slovakia	1st	Team - 50 km	12 pts
2013	World Championships	Moscow, Russia	DSQ (2nd)	50 km	3:38:58
2014	World Race Walking Cup	Taicang, China	1st	50 km	3:39:05
2014	European Championships	Zürich, Switzerland	4th	50 km	3:39:07
2015	European Race Walking Cup	Murcia, Spain	DSQ (1st)	50 km	3:43:32
2015	European Race Walking Cup	Murcia, Spain	DSQ (1st)	50 km - Team	8 pts
