= Grzegorz Sudoł =

Polish race walker (born 1978)

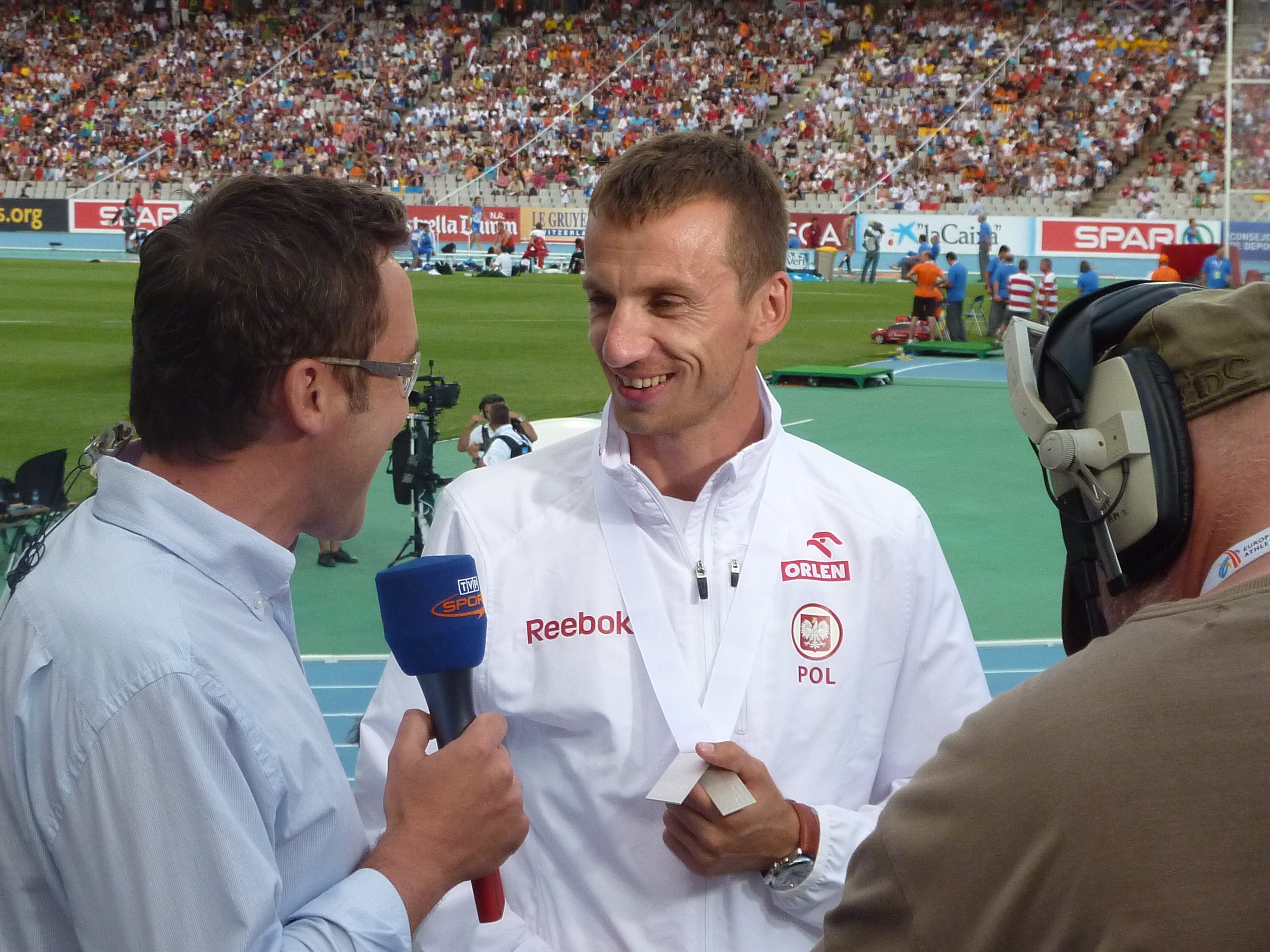
- Sudoł in 2010

Personal information
- Nationality: Poland
- Born: 28 August 1978 (age 48) Nowa Dęba, Poland
- Height: 1.75 m (5 ft 9 in)
- Weight: 64 kg (141 lb)

Sport
- Sport: Athletics
- Event: Race walking
- Club: AZS AWF Kraków
Medal record
Men's athletics
Representing Poland
World Championships
| Bronze medal – third place | 2009 Berlin | 50 km walk |
European Championships
| Silver medal – second place | 2010 Barcelona | 50 km walk |

Grzegorz Arkadiusz Sudoł (born 28 August 1978) is a Polish race walker.

== Competition record ==
| Year | Competition | Venue | Position | Event | Notes |
Representing Poland
| 1996 | World Junior Championships | Sydney, Australia | 7th | 10,000 m | 42:12.26 |
| 1997 | World Race Walking Cup | Poděbrady, Czech Republic | 71st | 20 km | 1:25:47 |
| 1997 | European Junior Championships | Ljubljana, Slovenia | 10th | 10,000 m | 44:33.35 |
| 1999 | World Race Walking Cup | Mézidon-Canon, France | 40th | 20 km | 1:27:54 |
| 2000 | European Race Walking Cup | Eisenhüttenstadt, Germany | 27th | 20 km | 1:25:02 |
| 2002 | European Championships | Munich, Germany | 10th | 50 km | 3:54:35 |
| 2002 | World Race Walking Cup | Turin, Italy | — | 20 km | DNF |
| 2003 | World Championships | Paris, France | — | 50 km | DQ |
| 2004 | World Race Walking Cup | Naumburg, Germany | 49th | 20 km | 1:26:12 |
| 2004 | Olympic Games | Athens, Greece | 7th | 50 km | 3:49:09 (=PB) |
| 2005 | World Championships | Helsinki, Finland | — | 50 km | DQ |
| 2006 | World Race Walking Cup | A Coruña, Spain | 33rd | 20 km | 1:24:50 |
| 2006 | European Championships | Gothenburg, Sweden | 10th | 50 km | 3:53:33 |
| 2007 | World Championships | Osaka, Japan | 21st | 50 km | 4:07:48 |
| 2008 | World Race Walking Cup | Cheboksary, Russia | — | 50 km | DNF |
| 2008 | Olympic Games | Beijing, China | 9th | 50 km | 3:47:18 |
| 2009 | World Championships | Berlin, Germany | 3rd | 50 km | 3:42:34 |
| 2010 | World Race Walking Cup | Chihuahua, Mexico | 53rd | 20 km | 1:33:27 |
| 2010 | European Championships | Barcelona, Spain | 2nd | 50 km | 3:42:24 (PB) |
| 2011 | European Race Walking Cup | Olhão, Portugal | 16th | 20 km | 1:28:49 |
| 2011 | World Championships | Daegu, South Korea | — | 50 km | DNF |
| 2012 | World Race Walking Cup | Saransk, Russia | — | 50 km | DNF |
| 2012 | Olympic Games | London, United Kingdom | 24th | 20 km | 1:22:40 |
| 2013 | European Race Walking Cup | Dudince, Slovakia | 5th | 50 km | 3:46:41 |
| 2013 | European Race Walking Cup | Dudince, Slovakia | 3rd | Team - 50 km | 31 pts |
| 2013 | World Championships | Moscow, Russia | 6th | 50 km | 3:41:20 |
| 2014 | World Race Walking Cup | Taicang, China | 62nd | 20 km | 1:24:29 |
| 2014 | European Championships | Zurich, Switzerland | — | 50 km | DNF |
| 2015 | European Race Walking Cup | Murcia, Spain | 7th | 50 km | 3:51:48 |

== Personal bests ==
- 3000 m walk – 11:42.7 (Germiston 2012)
- 5000 m walk – 19:06.07 (Reims 2012)
- 10,000 m walk – 40:58.89 (Kraków 2007)
- 10 km walk – 39:01 (Zaniemyśl 2005)
- 20 km walk – 1:20:50 (Lugano 2010)
- 30,000 m walk – 2:11:12.0 (Reims 2011)
- 50 km walk – 3:42:24 (Barcelona 2010)
