= Ihor Hlavan =

Ukrainian racewalker

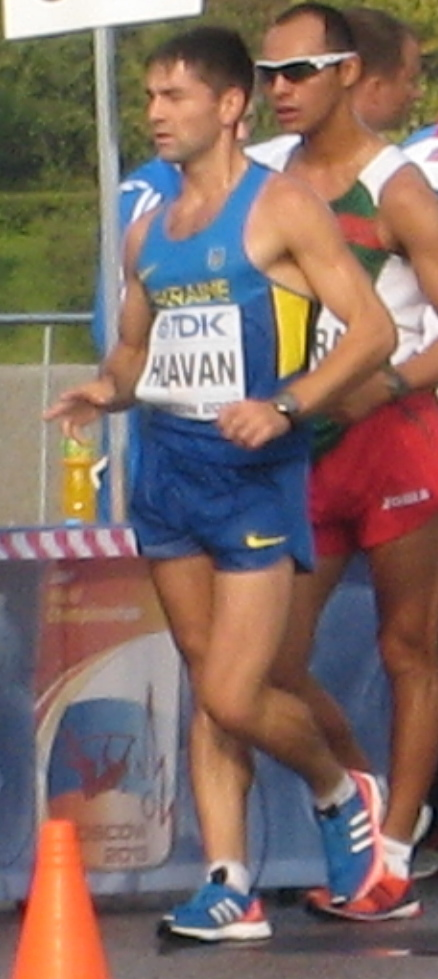
- Ihor Hlavan in 2013

Personal information
- Born: 25 September 1990 (age 35) Kropyvnytskyi, Soviet Union
- Education: National University of Physical Education and Sport of Ukraine
- Height: 1.72 m (5 ft 8 in)
- Weight: 62 kg (137 lb)

Sport
- Sport: Athletics
- Event: Race walking

Ihor Kostyantynovych Hlavan (Ukrainian: Ігор Костянтинович Главан; born 25 September 1990 in Nazarivka) is a Ukrainian race walker.

== Career ==
He competed at the 2012 and 2016 Summer Olympics. He finished third in the 2013 World Championships and fourth at the 2015 and 2017 World Championships.

== International competitions ==
Year	Competition	Venue	Position	Event	Notes
Representing Ukraine
2012	World Race Walking Cup	Saransk, Russia	10th	50 km walk	3:51:24
2012	Olympic Games	London, United Kingdom	16th	20 km walk	3:48:07
2013	European Race Walking Cup	Dudince, Slovakia	4th	50 km walk	3:46:09
2013	Universiade	Kazan, Russia	6th	20 km walk	1:22:32
2013	World Championships	Moscow, Russia	3rd	50 km walk	3:40:39
2014	World Race Walking Cup	Taicang, China	7th	20 km walk	1:19:59
2014	European Championships	Zürich, Switzerland	6th	50 km walk	3:45:08
2015	European Race Walking Cup	Murcia, Spain	5th	20 km walk	1:21:24
2015	Universiade	Taipei, Taiwan	6th	20 km walk	1:23:56
2015	World Championships	Beijing, China	4th	20 km walk	1:20:29
2015	World Championships	Beijing, China	–	50 km walk	DQ
2016	World Race Walking Team Championships	Rome, Italy	2nd	50 km walk	3:44:02
2016	Olympic Games	Rio de Janeiro, Brazil	35th	20 km walk	1:23:32
2016	Olympic Games	Rio de Janeiro, Brazil	–	50 km walk	DNF
2017	European Race Walking Cup	Poděbrady, Czech Republic	2nd	50 km walk	3:48:38
2017	World Championships	London, United Kingdom	4th	50 km walk	3:41:42
2017	Universiade	Taipei, Taiwan	6th	20 km walk	1:30:39

== Personal bests ==
Outdoor

- 5000 metres walk – 19:11.87 (Kyiv 2014)
- 10,000 metres walk – 41:49.65 (Mukachevo 2016)
- 20 kilometres walk – 1:19:59 (Taicang 2014)
- 35 metres walk – 2:31:40 (Ivano-Frankivsk 2017)
- 50 kilometres walk – 3:40:39 (Moscow 2013) NR

Indoor

- 5000 metres walk – 19:13.25 (Kyiv 2016)
- 10,000 metres walk – 39:06.06 (Sumy 2014) NR
