= Christopher Linke =

German racewalker (born 1988)

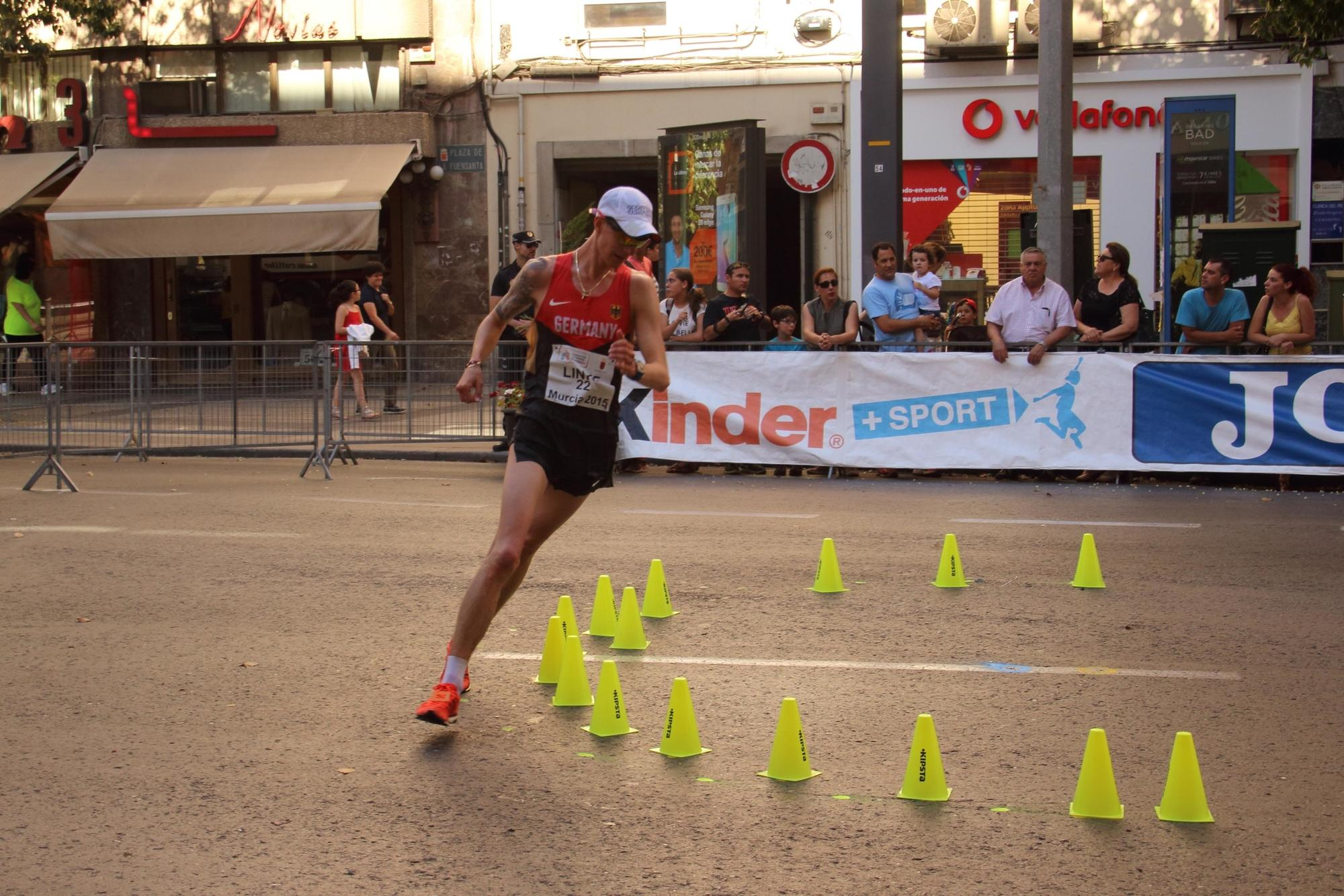
- Linke at the 2015 European Cup Race Walking

Personal information
- Born: 24 October 1988 (age 37) Potsdam, East Germany
- Height: 1.91 m (6 ft 3 in)
- Weight: 66 kg (146 lb)

Sport
- Country: Germany
- Sport: Athletics
- Event: 50km Race Walk

Achievements and titles
- Personal bests: 20 km: 1:18:12 (2023) NR; 35 km: 2:23:21 (2025) NR; 50 km: 3:47:33 (2012)
Medal record
Men's athletics
Representing Germany
European Championships
Silver medal – second place	2022 Munich	35 km walk
European Race Walking Team Championships
Silver medal – second place	2025 Poděbrady	35 km walk

Christopher Linke (born 24 October 1988 in Potsdam) is a German race walker. He competed in the 50 km event at the 2012 Summer Olympics in London, finishing in 24th place. In the 20 km event at the 2016 Olympics, he finished in 5th place. He also finished in 5th at the 2017 World Championships in that event. In 2019, he competed in the men's 20 kilometres walk at the 2019 World Athletics Championships held in Doha, Qatar. He finished in 4th place.

== Competition record ==
Year	Competition	Venue	Position	Event	Notes
Representing Germany
2007	European Race Walking Cup	Royal Leamington Spa, United Kingdom	7th	10 km walk	42:10
2007	European Junior Championships	Hengelo, Netherlands	6th	10,000 m walk	42:11.94
2008	World Race Walking Cup	Cheboksary, Russia	69th	20 km walk	1:27:49
2009	European U23 Championships	Kaunas, Lithuania	4th	20 km walk	1:24:29
2010	European Championships	Barcelona, Spain	–	50 km walk	DNF
2011	European Race Walking Cup	Olhão, Portugal	3rd	50 km walk	3:52:56
2011	World Championships	Daegu, South Korea	21st	20 km walk	1:24:17
2012	World Race Walking Cup	Saransk, Russia	5th	50 km walk	3:47:33
2012	Olympic Games	London, United Kingdom	24th	50 km walk	3:49:19
2013	European Race Walking Cup	Dudince, Slovakia	10th	20 km walk	1:23:28
2013	World Championships	Moscow, Russia	9th	20 km walk	1:22:36
2014	European Championships	Zürich, Switzerland	5th	20 km walk	1:21:00
2015	European Race Walking Cup	Murcia, Spain	7th	20 km	1:22:06
2015	European Race Walking Cup	Murcia, Spain	1st	Team - 20 km	32 pts
2015	World Championships	Beijing, China	38th	20 km walk	1:26:10
2016	World Race Walking Team Championships	Rome, Italy	10th	20 km walk	1:20:40
2016	Olympic Games	Rio de Janeiro, Brazil	5th	20 km walk	1:20:00
2017	World Championships	London, United Kingdom	5th	20 km walk	1:19:21
