= Jarkko Kinnunen =

Finnish race walker (born 1984)

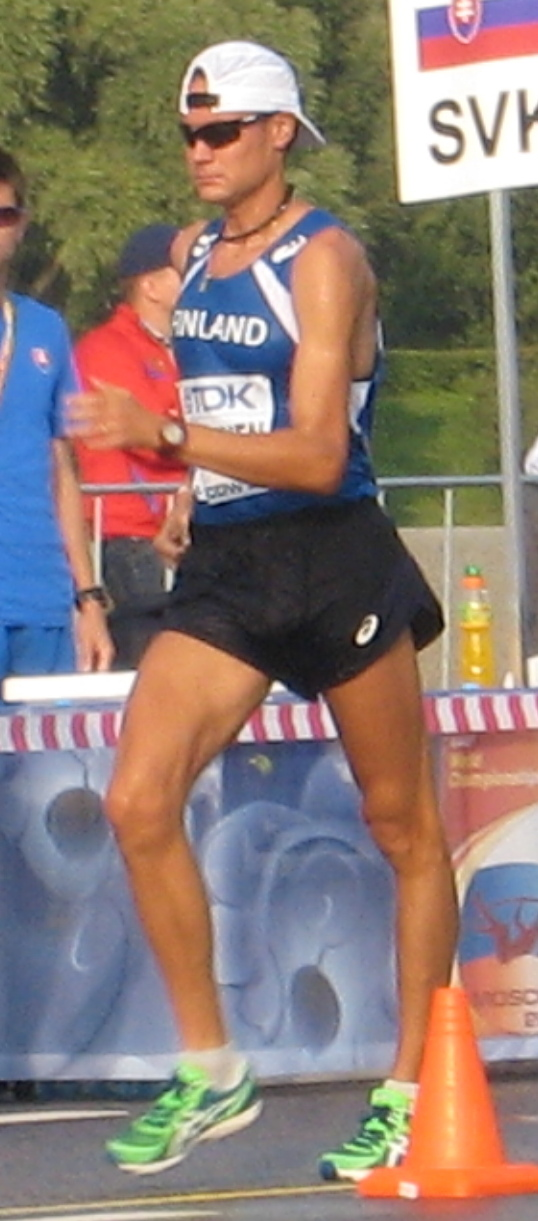
- Jarkko Kinnunen in 2013

Personal information
- Born: 19 January 1984 (age 42) Jalasjärvi, Finland
- Height: 1.88 m (6 ft 2 in)
- Weight: 69 kg (152 lb)

Sport
- Country: Finland
- Sport: Athletics
- Event: 50km Race Walk

Jarkko Juhani Kinnunen (born 19 January 1984 in Jalasjärvi) is a Finnish race walker. His trainer is Kari Ahonen since 1999.

== Achievements ==
Year	Competition	Venue	Position	Event	Notes
Representing Finland
2001	World Youth Championships	Debrecen, Hungary	10th	10,000 m	45:06.31
2006	World Race Walking Cup	A Coruña, Spain	29th	50 km	3:59:39
2006	European Championships	Gothenburg, Sweden	14th	50 km	3:56:54
2007	World Championships	Osaka, Japan	10th	50 km	3:58:22
2008	Finnish Championships	Tampere, Finland	1st	20 km	1:25.56
2008	Olympic Games	Beijing, China	15th	50 km	3:52:25
2009	European Race Walking Cup	Metz, France	10th	20 km	1:27:43
2009	Finnish Championships	Espoo, Finland	1st	20 km	1:27.30
2009	World Championships	Berlin, Germany	8th	50 km	3:47:36
2010	European Championships	Barcelona, Spain	—	50 km	DNF
2011	World Championships	Daegu, South Korea	15th	50 km	3:52:32
2012	World Race Walking Cup	Saransk, Russia	31st	20 km	1:23:43
2012	Olympic Games	London, United Kingdom	12th	50 km	3:46:25
2013	European Race Walking Cup	Dudince, Slovakia	—	50 km	DNF
2013	World Championships	Moscow, Russia	20th	50 km	3:50:56
2014	European Championships	Zurich, Switzerland	11th	50 km	3:48:49
2015	European Race Walking Cup	Murcia, Spain	24th	20 km	1:26:03
2015	European Race Walking Cup	Murcia, Spain	8th	Team - 20 km	80 pts
2015	World Championships	Beijing, China	32nd	50 km	4:02:07
