= Leonardo Dei Tos =

Italian racewalker

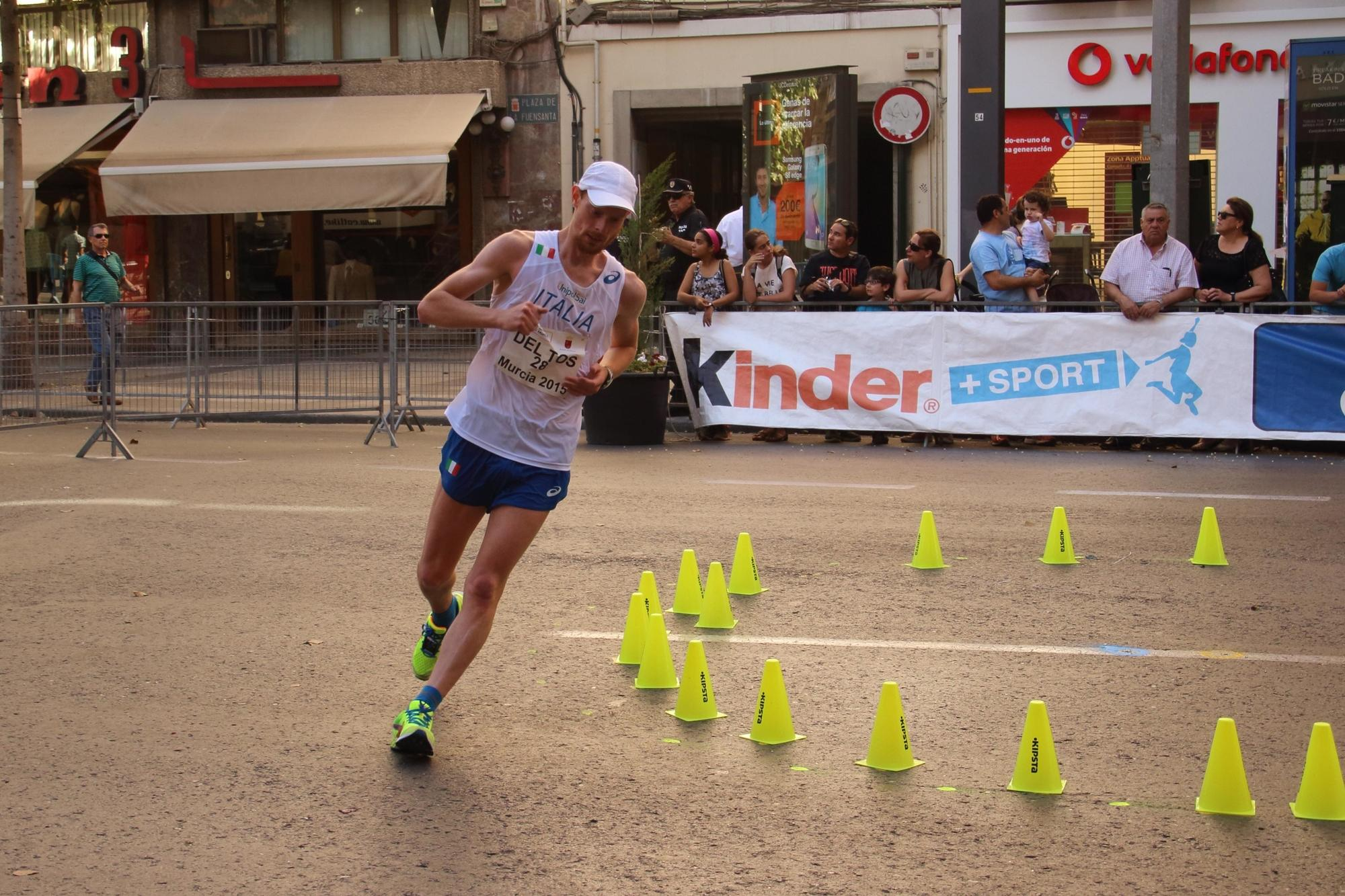
- Dei Tos (note the name on the bib not written correctly) in Murcia 2015.

Personal information
- National team: Italy (5 caps)
- Born: 27 April 1992 (age 34) Vittorio Veneto, Italy
- Height: 1.80 m (5 ft 11 in)
- Weight: 62 kg (137 lb)

Sport
- Country: Italy
- Sport: Athletics
- Event: Racewalking
- Club: Athletic Club 96 Alperia Bolzano
- Coached by: Enzo Fiorillo

Achievements and titles
- Personal bests: 20 km walk: 1:22:58 (2015); 50 km walk: 3:56:56 (2019)

Leonardo Dei Tos (born 27 April 1992) is an Italian male racewalker, who won two Italian Athletics Championships and competed at the 2016 IAAF World Race Walking Team Championships.

== Achievements ==
Year	Competition	Venue	Position	Event	Performance	Notes
2016	World Race Walking Team Championships	(Italy) Rome	67th	20 km	1:26:38	
2016	World Race Walking Team Championships	(Italy) Rome	14th	20 km team	160 pts	

== National titles ==
- Italian Athletics Championships
  - 50 km walk: 2018
- Italian Athletics Indoor Championships
  - 5000 metres walk: 2015
