= Federica Ferraro =

Italian racewalker

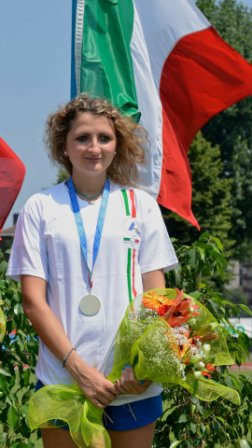

Personal information
- National team: Italy
- Born: 18 August 1988 (age 37) Savona, Italy
- Height: 1.68 m (5 ft 6 in)
- Weight: 51 kg (112 lb)

Sport
- Sport: Athletics
- Event: Racewalking
- Club: Aeronautica
- Coached by: Claudio Penolazzi

Achievements and titles
- Personal bests: 3000 m walk: 13:16.88 (2015); 5000 m walk: 22:33.0 (2012); 5 Km walk: 23:39 (2007); 10,000 m walk: 45:08.81 (2013); 10 Km walk: 43:53 (2013); 20 Km walk: 1:31:20 (2013)
Medal record
European Race Walking Cup
Silver medal – second place	2015 Murcia	Team

Federica Ferraro (born 18 August 1988) is an Italian racewalker, four-time national champion at senior level.

== National titles ==
- Italian Athletics Championships
  - 20 km race walk: 2011, 2012, 2013
  - 10,000 m race walk (track): 2011

== See also ==
- Italian team at the running events
- Italy at the European Race Walking Cup
