= Łukasz Nowak =

Polish race walker (born 1988)

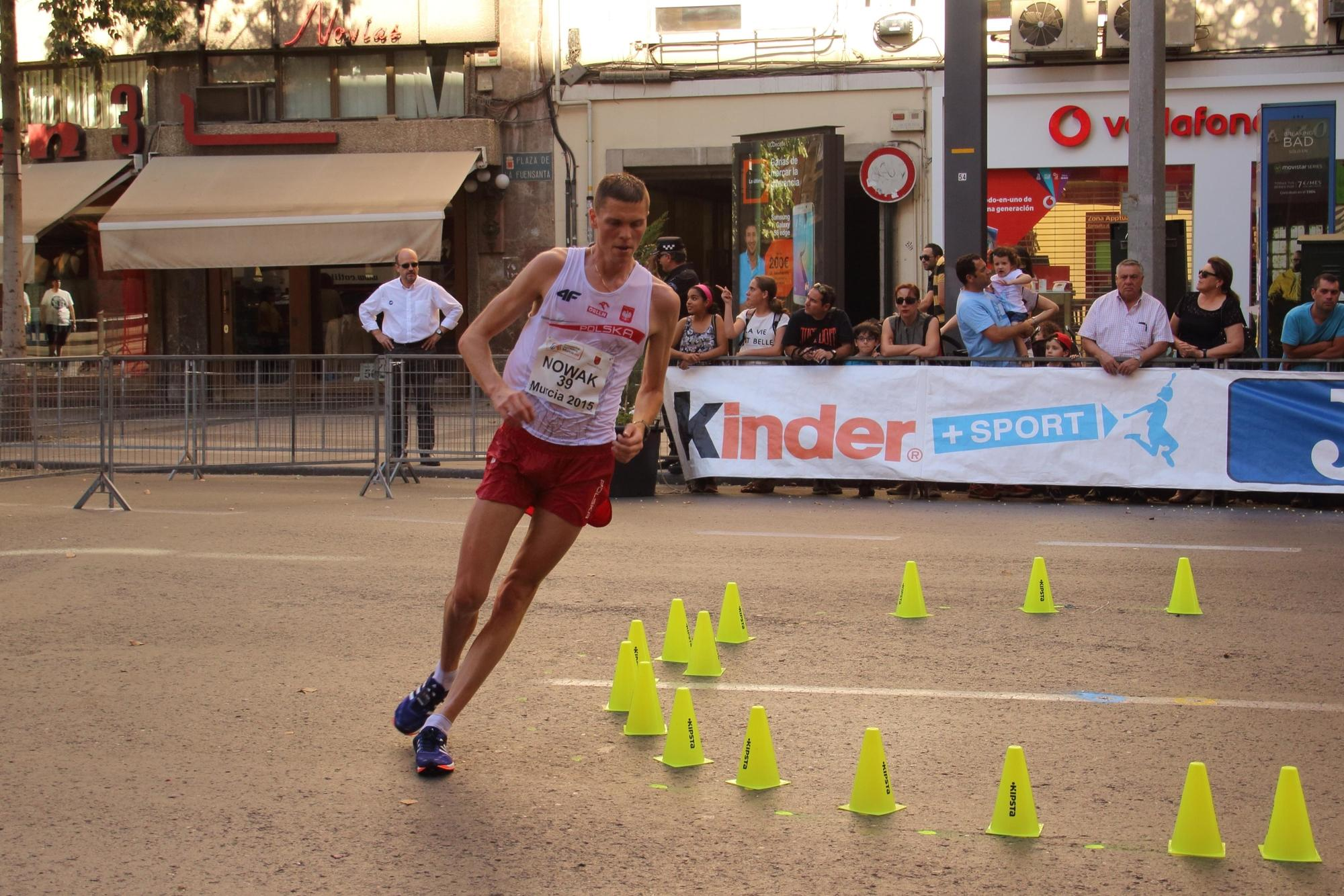
- Nowak at the 2015 European Cup Race Walking

Personal information
- Nationality: Poland
- Born: 18 December 1988 (age 37) Poznań, Poland
- Height: 1.94 m (6 ft 4 in)
- Weight: 78 kg (172 lb)

Sport
- Sport: Athletics
- Event: Race walking
- Club: AZS Poznań

Łukasz Nowak (born 18 December 1988, in Poznań) is a Polish race walker.

He finished 6th in the 50 kilometers walk at the 2012 Olympic Games in London with a new personal best of 3:42:47.

== Competition record ==
Year	Competition	Venue	Position	Event	Notes
Representing Poland
2009	European U23 Championships	Kaunas, Lithuania	13th	20 km	1:28:21
2010	European Championships	Barcelona, Spain	8th	50 km	3:51:31
2011	Universiade	Shenzhen, China	11th	20 km	1:27:53
2012	World Race Walking Cup	Saransk, Russia	—	50 km	DNF
2012	Olympic Games	London, United Kingdom	6th	50 km	3:42:47
2013	European Race Walking Cup	Dudince, Slovakia	16th	20 km	1:24:24
2013	European Race Walking Cup	Dudince, Slovakia	3rd	Team – 20 km	44 pts
2013	World Championships	Moscow, Russia	8th	50 km	3:43:38
2014	World Race Walking Cup	Taicang, China	55th	20 km	1:23:48
2014	European Championships	Zürich, Switzerland	—	50 km	DNF
2015	European Race Walking Cup	Murcia, Spain	—	20 km	DQ
2015	World Championships	Beijing, China	—	50 km	DQ

== Personal bests ==
Outdoor

- 3000 m walk – 11:41.30 (Sosnowiec 2011)
- 5000 m walk – 19:24.57 (Katowice 2011)
- 10 km walk – 40:40 (Zaniemyśl 2014)
- 20 km walk – 1:20:48 (Zaniemyśl 2013)
- 50 km walk – 3:42:47 (London 2012)

Indoor

- 5000 m walk – 19:13.08 (Sopot 2014)
