= Marco De Luca =

Italian race walker

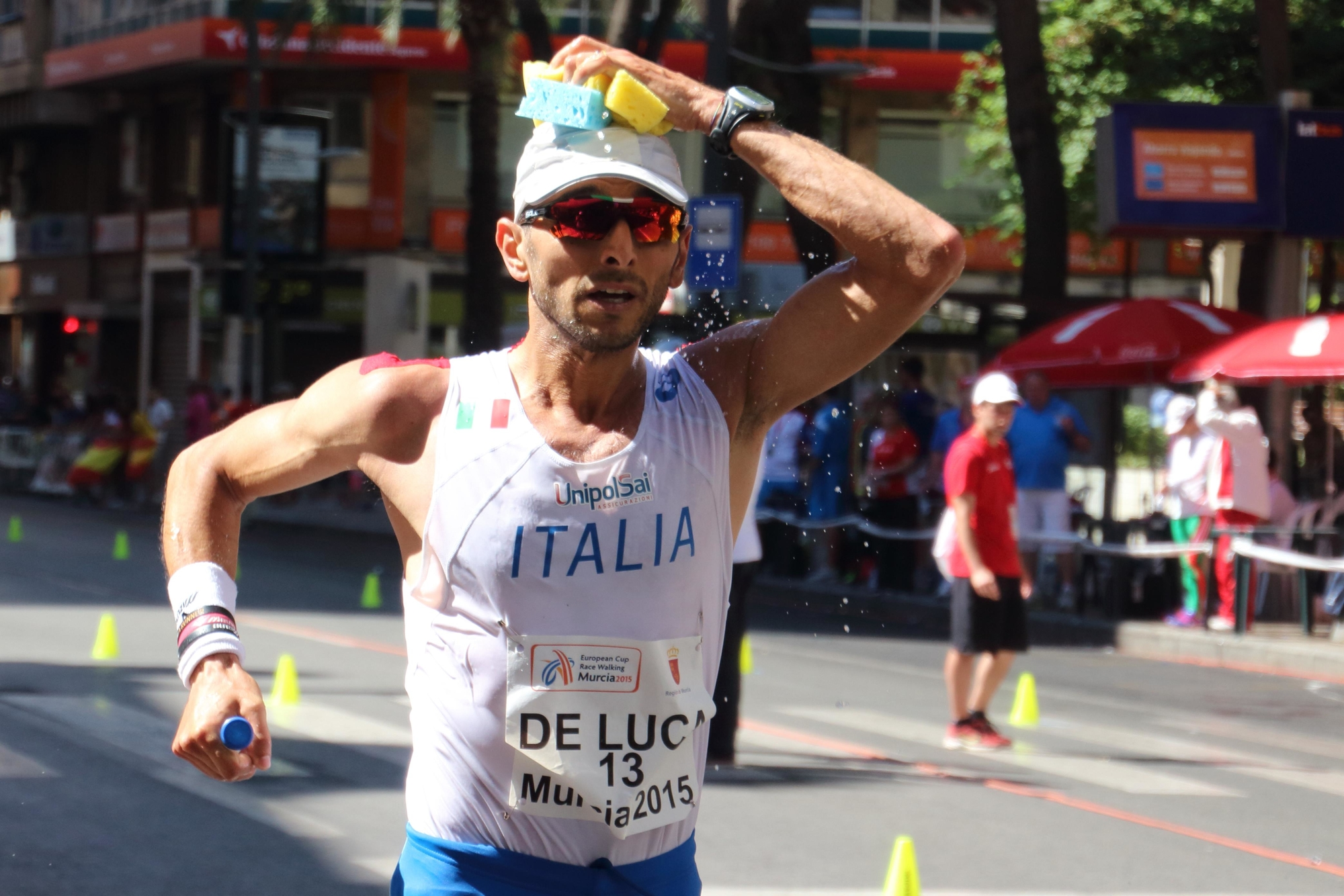
- De Luca in 2015

Personal information
- Nationality: Italian
- Born: May 12, 1981 (age 45) Rome
- Height: 1.88 m (6 ft 2 in)
- Weight: 72 kg (159 lb)

Sport
- Country: Italy
- Sport: Athletics
- Event: 50km Race Walk
- Club: G.S. Fiamme Gialle

Achievements and titles
- Personal bests: 20 km: 1:22:01 (2016); 50 km: 3:44:47 (2016)
Medal record
Event	1st	2nd	3rd
World Race Walking Cup	2	1	1
European Race Walking Team C'ships	2	2	3
Total	4	3	4
World Race Walking Cup
Gold medal – first place	2008 Cheboksary	50 km team
Gold medal – first place	2016 Rome	50 km team
Silver medal – second place	2018 Taicang	20 km team
Bronze medal – third place	2016 Rome	50 km individual
European Race Walking Team Championships
Gold medal – first place	2011 Olhão	50 km team
Gold medal – first place	2021 Poděbrady	50 km team
Gold medal – first place	2015 Murcia	50 km individual
Silver medal – second place	2011 Olhão	50 km individual
Silver medal – second place	2015 Murcia	50 km team
Bronze medal – third place	2005 Miskolc	50 km team
Bronze medal – third place	2009 Metz	50 km team

Marco De Luca (born 12 May 1981 in Rome) is an Italian race walker. His best results at International level are 7th place at 2009 World Championships and 6th at 2006 European Championships and 2010 European Championships.

But the most prestigious achievement of his career was achieved in 2016, at age 35, when he finished fourth at the World Race Walking Team Championships, but was awarded the bronze medal following the disqualification for doping of the teammate Alex Schwazer, who had won the gold medal.

He competed at the 2020 Summer Olympics in 50 km walk.

== Biography ==
Marco De Luca won three times the individual national championship. At London 2017 for him it is the seventh consecutive participation in the World Championships. He also participated at three editions of the Summer Olympics from 2008 to 201 and four consecutive editions (2006, 2010, 2014, 2018) of European Championships (in the editions of the European Championships of the Olympic years, 2012 and 2016, the race walk was not part of the program).

== Achievements ==
Year	Competition	Venue	Position	Event	Notes
2005	European Race Walking Cup	Miskolc, Hungary	13th	50 km	3:55:30
2005	European Race Walking Cup	Miskolc, Hungary	3rd	50 km team	30 pts
2005	World Championships	Helsinki, Finland	13th	50 km	3:58:32
2006	World Race Walking Cup	A Coruña, Spain	9th	50 km	3:49:43 PB
2006	European Championships	Gothenburg, Sweden	6th	50 km	3:48:08
2007	European Race Walking Cup	Royal Leamington Spa, United Kingdom	8th	50 km	3:47:04
2007	World Championships	Osaka, Japan	—	50 km	DNF
2008	World Race Walking Cup	Cheboksary, Russia	8th	50 km	3:49:21
2008	World Race Walking Cup	Cheboksary, Russia	1st	50 km team	128 pts
2008	Olympic Games	Beijing, China	19th	50 km	3:54:47
2009	European Race Walking Cup	Metz, France	8th	50 km	3:54:35
2009	European Race Walking Cup	Metz, France	3rd	50 km team	38 pts
2009	World Championships	Berlin, Germany	7th	50 km	3:46:31
2010	World Race Walking Cup	Chihuahua, Mexico	14th	50 km	4:00:45
2010	European Championships	Barcelona, Spain	6th	50 km	3:48:36
2011	European Race Walking Cup	Olhão, Portugal	2nd	50 km	3:50:13
2011	European Race Walking Cup	Olhão, Portugal	1st	50 km team	16 pts
2011	World Championships	Daegu, South Korea	12th	50 km	3:49:40
2012	World Race Walking Cup	Saransk, Russia	8th	50 km	3:49:50
2012	Olympic Games	London, Great Britain	17th	50 km	3:47:19
2013	World Championships	Moscow, Russia	15th	50 km	3:48:05
2014	World Race Walking Cup	Taicang, China	51st	20 km	1:23:34
2014	European Championships	Zürich, Switzerland	7th	50 km	3:45:25
2015	European Race Walking Cup	Murcia, Spain	1st	50 km	3:46:21
2015	European Race Walking Cup	Murcia, Spain	2nd	50 km team	23 pts
2015	World Championships	Beijing, China	16th	50 km	3:53:02
2016	World Race Walking Cup	Rome, Italy	3rd	50 km	3:44:47
2016	World Race Walking Cup	Rome, Italy	1st	50 km team	10 pts
2016	Olympic Games	Rio de Janeiro, Brazil	21st	50 km	3:54:40
2017	World Championships	London, England	9th	50 km	3:45:02 SB

== National titles ==
- Italian Athletics Championships
  - 20 km walk: road: 2011
  - 50 km walk: road: 2006, 2009

== See also ==
- Italy at the European Race Walking Cup - Multiple medalists
- Italian all-time lists - 50 km walk
