= Ivan Noskov =

Russian racewalker

Ivan Sergeyevich Noskov
Personal information
- Native name: Иван Сергеевич Носков
- Born: July 16, 1988 (age 38) Novopetropavlovskoe, Dalmatovsky District, Kurgan Oblast, RSFSR, USSR

Sport
- Country: Russia

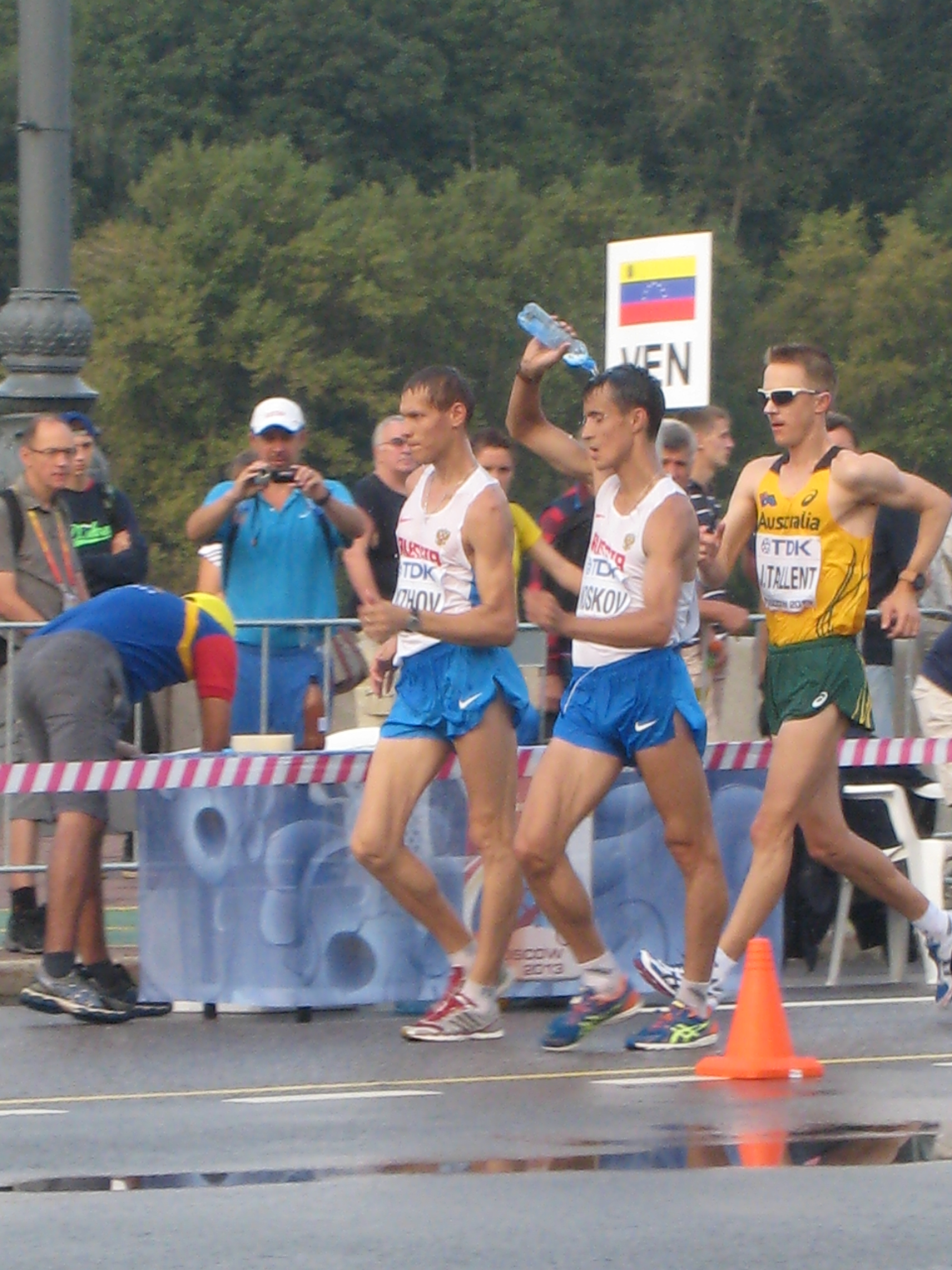
Noskov, Ryzhov and Tallent at 50 km walk race in Moscow

Ivan Sergeyevich Noskov (Russian: Иван Сергеевич Носков; born 16 July 1988 in Novopetropavlovskoe, Dalmatovsky District, Kurgan Oblast) is a Russian race walker. He won the bronze medal in the 50 kilometres walk event at the 2014 European Athletics Championships in Zürich, Switzerland.

== Doping case ==
In September 2015 IAAF confirmed that Noskov was provisionally suspended after a sample from an out-of-competition control in Saransk in June had tested positive for a prohibited substance.

In October 2016, the Court of Arbitration for Sport decided to disqualify five Russian track and field athletes, including Ivan Noskov, because traces of Erythropoietin (EPO) were detected in all of the athletes.

== Personal bests ==
| Event | Ensue | Venue | Date |
|---|---|---|---|
| 20 km | 1:23:49 hrs | Voronovo, Belarus | 17 September 2011 |
| 50 km | 3:37:41 hrs | Zürich, Switzerland | 15 August 2014 |

== Competition record ==
| Year | Competition | Venue | Position | Event | Notes |
Representing Russia
| 2012 | World Race Walking Cup | Saransk, Russia | 19th | 50 km | 3:55:16 |
| 2013 | European Race Walking Cup | Dudince, Slovakia | 3rd | 50 km | 3:45:31 |
| 2013 | European Race Walking Cup | Dudince, Slovakia | 1st | Team - 50 km | 12 pts |
| 2013 | World Championships | Moscow, Russia | 7th | 50 km | 3:41:36 |
| 2014 | World Race Walking Cup | Taicang, China | 2nd | 50 km | 3:39:38 |
| 2014 | European Championships | Zürich, Switzerland | 3rd | 50 km | 3:37:41 |
| 2015 | European Race Walking Cup | Murcia, Spain | DSQ ~~2nd~~ | 50 km | ~~3:43:57~~ |
| 2015 | European Race Walking Cup | Murcia, Spain | DSQ ~~1st~~ | 50 km - Team | ~~8 pts~~ |
