= Stefano Chiesa =

Italian athlete (born 1996)

Personal information
- Nationality: Italian
- Born: 25 May 1996 (age 29)

Sport
- Sport: Track and Field
- Event: Race walking

Stefano Chiesa (born 25 May 1996) is an Italian athlete who specialises in race walking.

From Verbania, he had achieved the Olympic qualifying standard for the 50 km race walk in October 2019 in the Tilburg 50 km, with a time of 3:48:25. In November 2019 however, he injured a metatarsal in a national training camp in Tuscany. The time he recorded was described as remarkable as it was 23 minutes faster than his previous best time of 4:11:07. Chiesa was named in the Italian squad for the World Race Walking Championships in 2022 held in Muscat.
