= Andreea Arsine =

Romanian racewalker

Personal information
- Born: 14 September 1988 (age 37) Botoșani, Romania

Sport
- Sport: Track and field
- Event: 20 kilometres race walk
- Club: CSU Galați

Andreea Arsine (born 14 September 1988) is a Romanian race walker. She competed in the women's 20 kilometres walk event at the 2016 Summer Olympics. In 2018, she competed in the women's 20 kilometres walk event at the 2018 European Athletics Championships held in Berlin, Germany. She finished in 26th place.
