= Marius Cocioran =

Romanian race walker

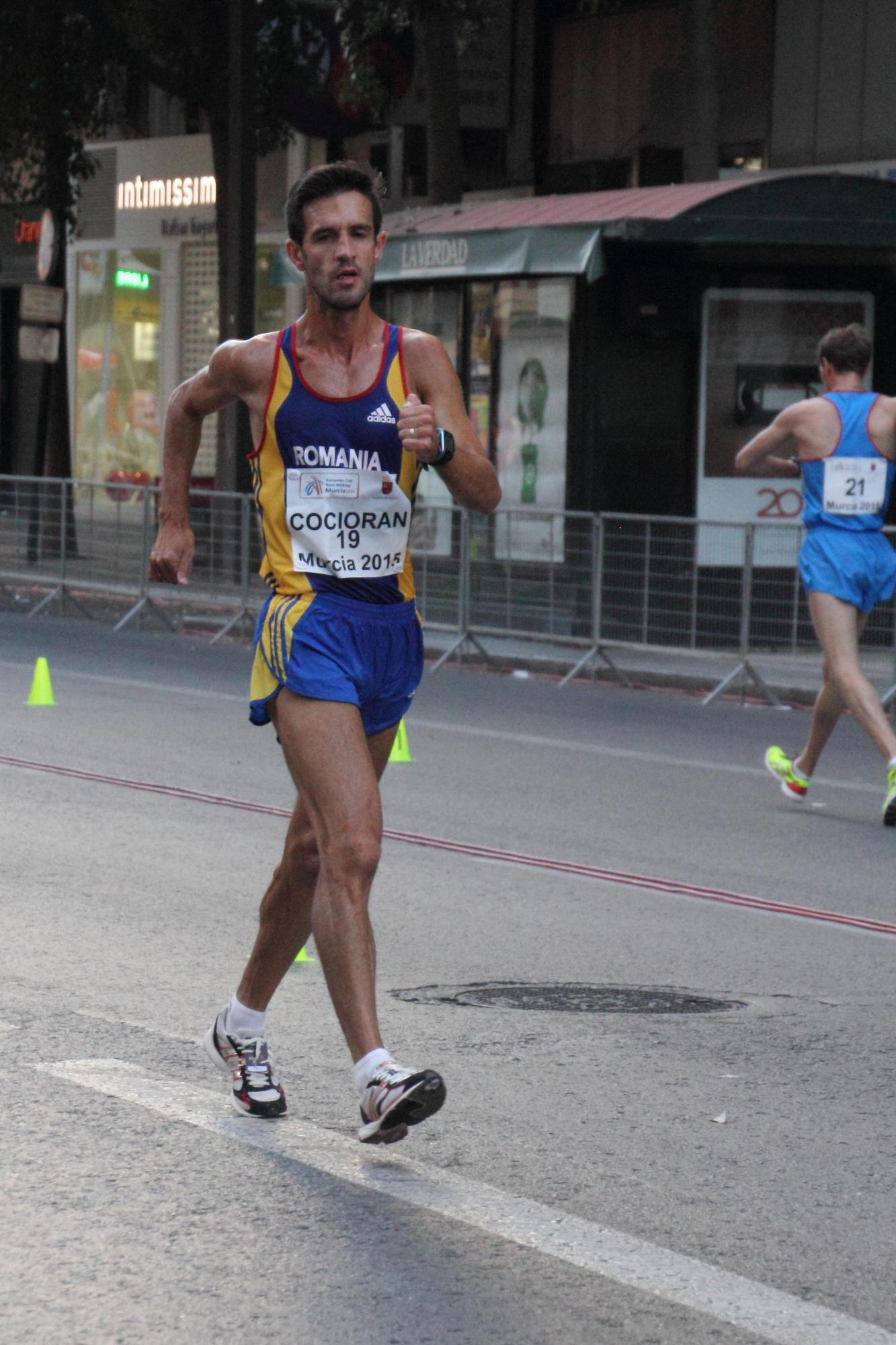
- Cocioran at the 2015 European Cup Race Walking

Personal information
- Full name: Marius Iulian Cocioran
- Born: July 10, 1983 (age 43)

Sport
- Country: Romania
- Sport: Athletics
- Event: 50 km race walk

Marius Iulian Cocioran (born 10 July 1983, in Reșița) is a Romanian race walker. He competed in the 50 kilometres walk event at the 2012 Summer Olympics.

== Competition record ==
Year	Competition	Venue	Position	Event	Notes
Representing Romania
2012	World Race Walking Cup	Saransk, Russia	24th	50 km walk	3:57:55
2012	Olympic Games	London, United Kingdom	39th	50 km walk	3:57:52
2013	European Race Walking Cup	Dudince, Slovakia	–	50 km walk	DNF
2013	World Championships	Moscow, Russia	40th	50 km walk	4:04:23
2014	European Championships	Zürich, Switzerland	23rd	50 km walk	4:03:25
2015	European Race Walking Cup	Murcia, Spain	9th	50 km	3:55:59
2015	World Championships	Beijing, China	—	50 km	DNF
