= Brendan Boyce =

Irish race walker

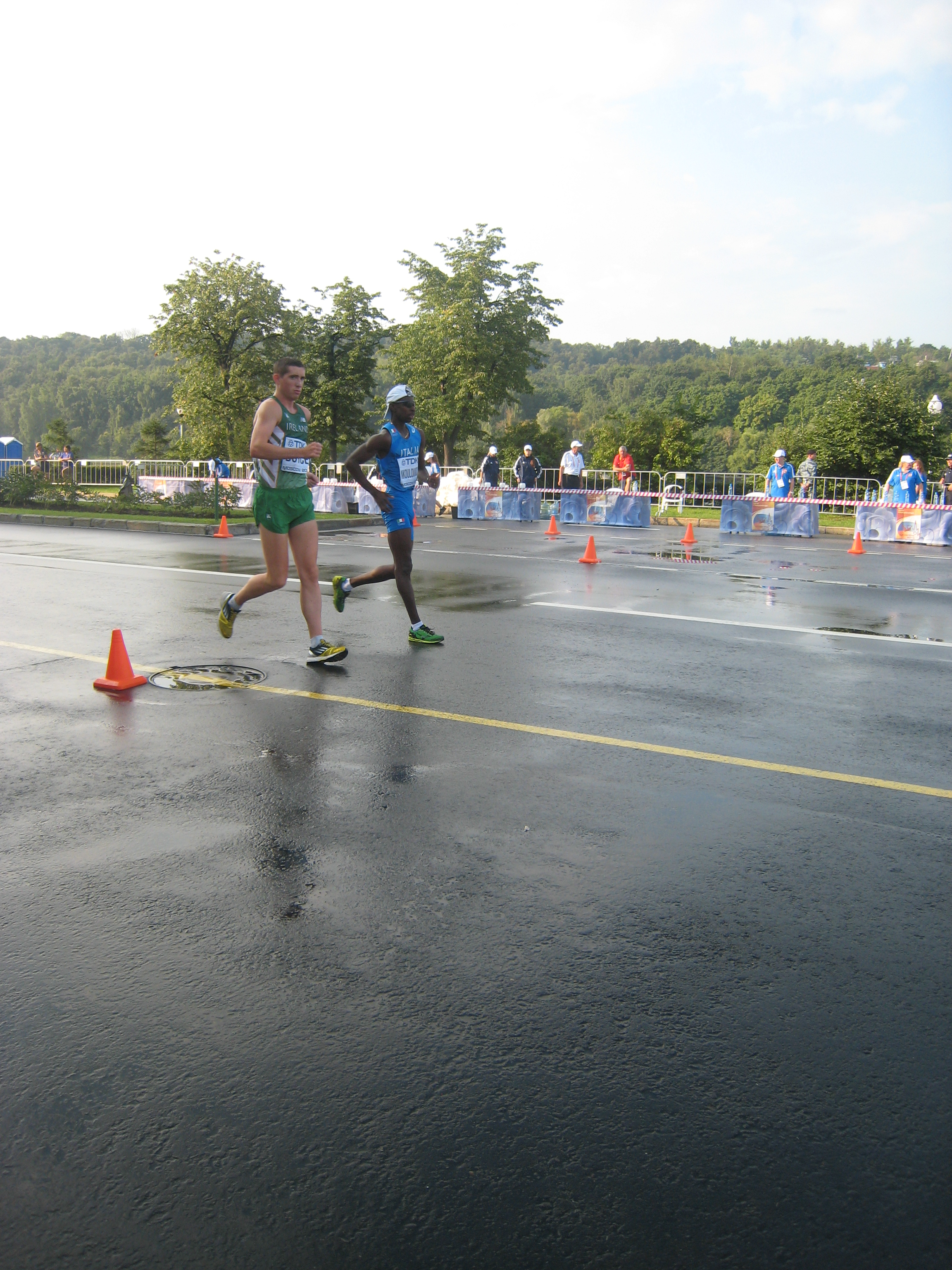
- Boyce (left) in Moscow (2013)

Personal information
- Born: 15 October 1986 (age 39) Milford, County Donegal, Ireland
- Height: 1.83 m (6 ft 0 in)
- Weight: 76 kg (168 lb)

Sport
- Country: Ireland
- Sport: racewalking
- Events: 20 km walk 50 km walk
- Club: Letterkenny Athletics Club

Achievements and titles
- Personal bests: 20km: 1:24:38; 50km: 3:48:55

Brendan Boyce (born 15 October 1986) is an Irish race walker. He competed at the 2012 Summer Olympics in the 50k walk, coming 29th, and the 2013 World Championships in Athletics where he came 25th. He competed at the 2016 Summer Olympics in the 50k walk where he finished in the top twenty, bettering his performance of the previous Olympiad. In 2021, he represented Ireland at the 2020 Summer Olympics, placing 10th in the men's 50 kilometres walk.

== Competition record ==
Year	Competition	Venue	Position	Event	Notes
Representing Ireland
2011	European Race Walking Cup	Olhão, Portugal	27th	20 km walk	1:32:17
2011	Universiade	London, United Kingdom	15th	20 km walk	1:29:48
2012	World Race Walking Cup	Saransk, Russia	63rd	20 km walk	1:27:46
2012	Olympic Games	London, United Kingdom	29th	50 km walk	3:55:01
2013	European Race Walking Cup	Dudince, Slovakia	35th	20 km walk	1:28:56
2013	World Championships	Moscow, Russia	25th	50 km walk	3:54:24
2014	World Race Walking Cup	Taicang, China	77th	20 km walk	1:26:55
2014	European Championships	Zürich, Switzerland	16th	50 km walk	3:51:34
2015	European Race Walking Cup	Murcia, Spain	27th	20 km walk	1:26:47
2015	World Championships	Beijing, China	—	50 km walk	DQ
2016	World Race Walking team championships	Rome, Italy	63rd	20 km walk	1:25:38
2016	Olympic Games	Rio de Janeiro, Brazil	19th	50 km walk	3:53:59
2017	European Race Walking Cup	Poděbrady, Czech Republic	4th	50 km walk	3:49:49
2019	World Athletics Championships	Doha, Qatar	6th	50 km walk	4:07:46
2021	2020 Summer Olympics	Sapporo, Japan	10th	50 km walk	3:53:40

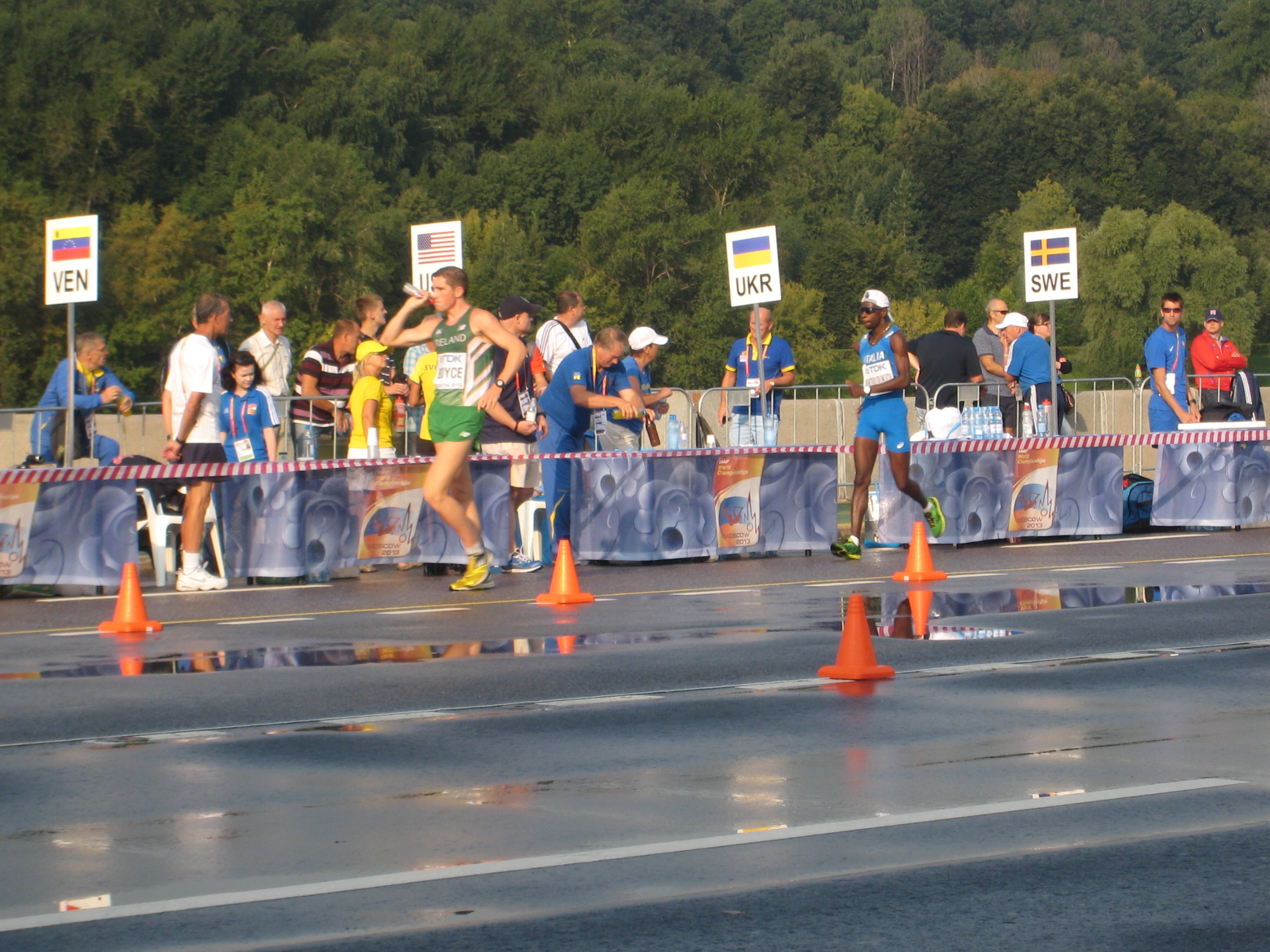
Boyce (left, in green) at the 2013 World Championships in Athletics in Moscow
