= José Ignacio Díaz =

Spanish racewalker

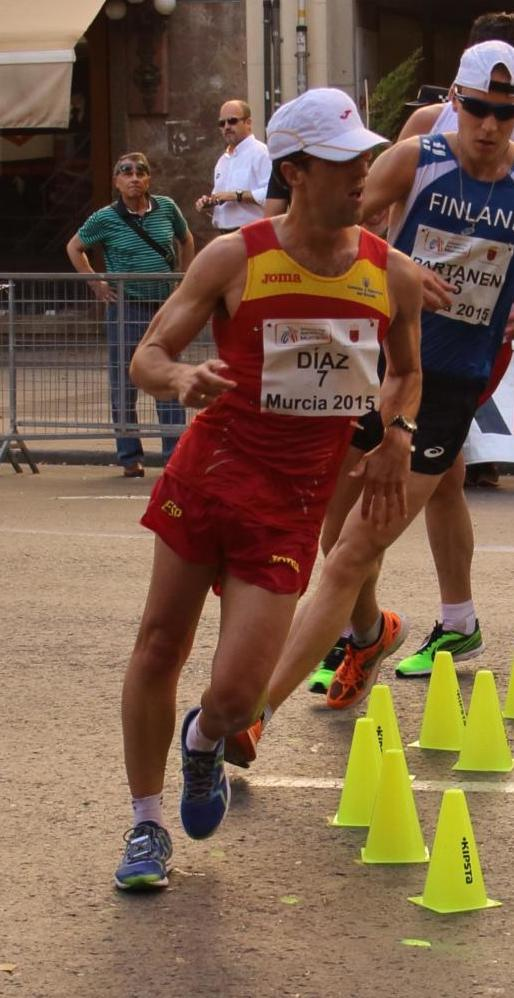
Díaz at the 2015 European Cup Race Walking.

José Ignacio Díaz Velázquez (born November 22, 1979) is a Spanish racewalker. He competed at the 2016 Summer Olympics in the men's 50 kilometres walk but did not finish the race.

In 2018, he competed in the men's 50 kilometres walk at the 2018 European Athletics Championships held in Berlin, Germany. He finished in 9th place. In 2019, he competed in the men's 50 kilometres walk at the 2019 World Athletics Championships held in Doha, Qatar. He did not finish his race.
