= Michal Morvay =

Slovakian athlete (born 1996)

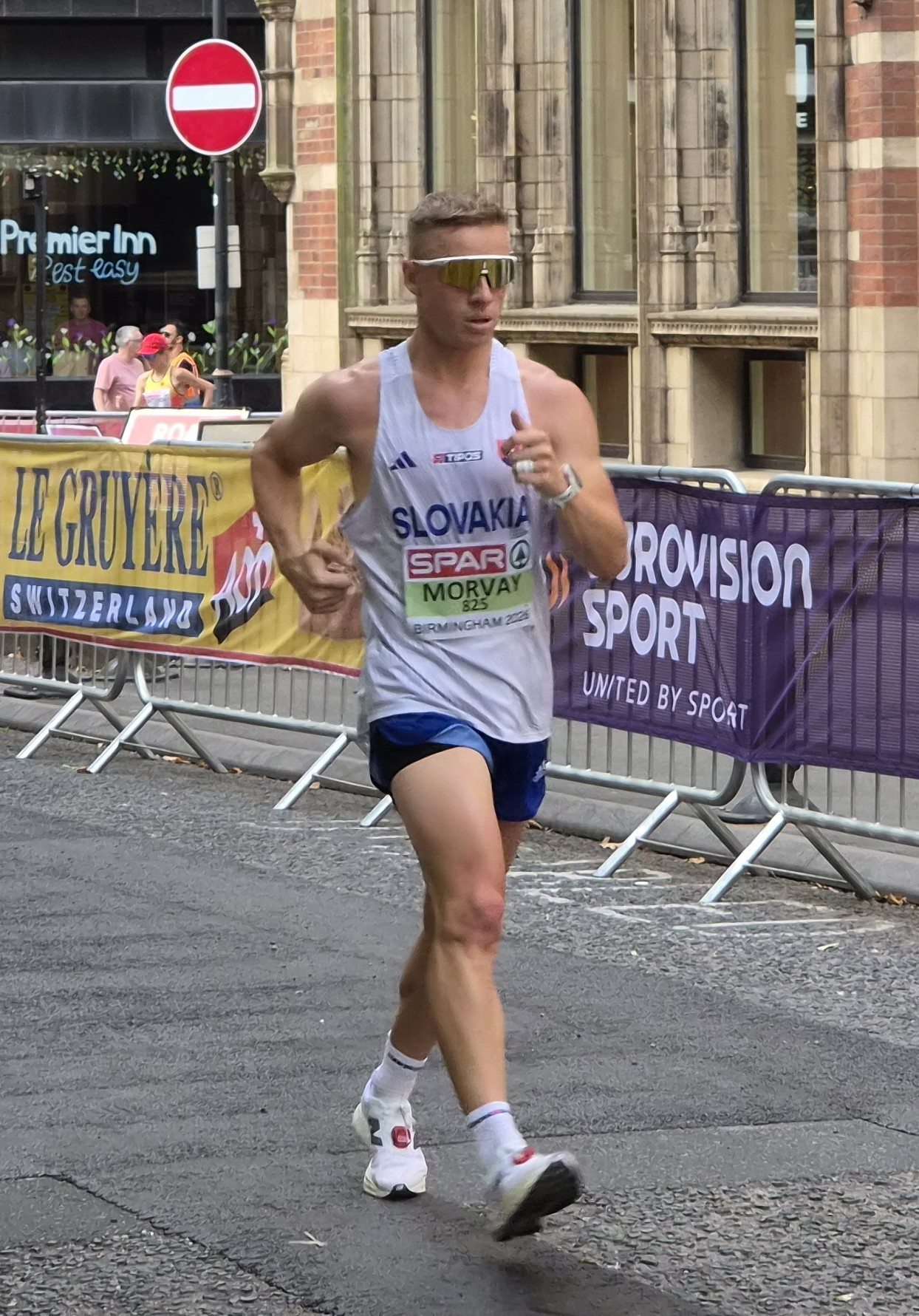
- 2026 European Championships

Personal information
- Nationality: Slovakian
- Born: 12 August 1996 (age 30)

Sport
- Sport: Track and Field
- Event: Race Walking

Michal Morvay (born 12 August 1996) is a Slovak athlete who competes in race walking.

== Career ==
In 2013, Morvay won the under-17s 10km in a time of 44:54 at the European Athletics Race Walking Circuit in Lugano.

The champion of Slovakia in 2019, in February 2021 Morvay had to have surgery on his knee cartilage but it was at the Dudinská Päťdesiatka that he sealed his place at the delayed 2020 Tokyo Olympic Games in the 50 kilometres race walk with a personal best time 3:57:59, and he became the champion of Slovakia again. In Tokyo, Morvay finished 41st overall in the 50km race walk event.

He was selected for the Slovak team to compete at the 2025 World Athletics Championships in Tokyo, Japan, in September 2025.
