= Maciej Rosiewicz =

Polish racewalker

Maciej Rosiewicz (born 31 July 1977) is a Polish race walker representing Georgia. He competed in the 50 kilometres walk event at the 2012 Summer Olympics.

In 2011, Rosiewicz obtained Georgian citizenship and is representing Georgia since then.
