= Teodorico Caporaso =

Italian racewalker (born 1987)

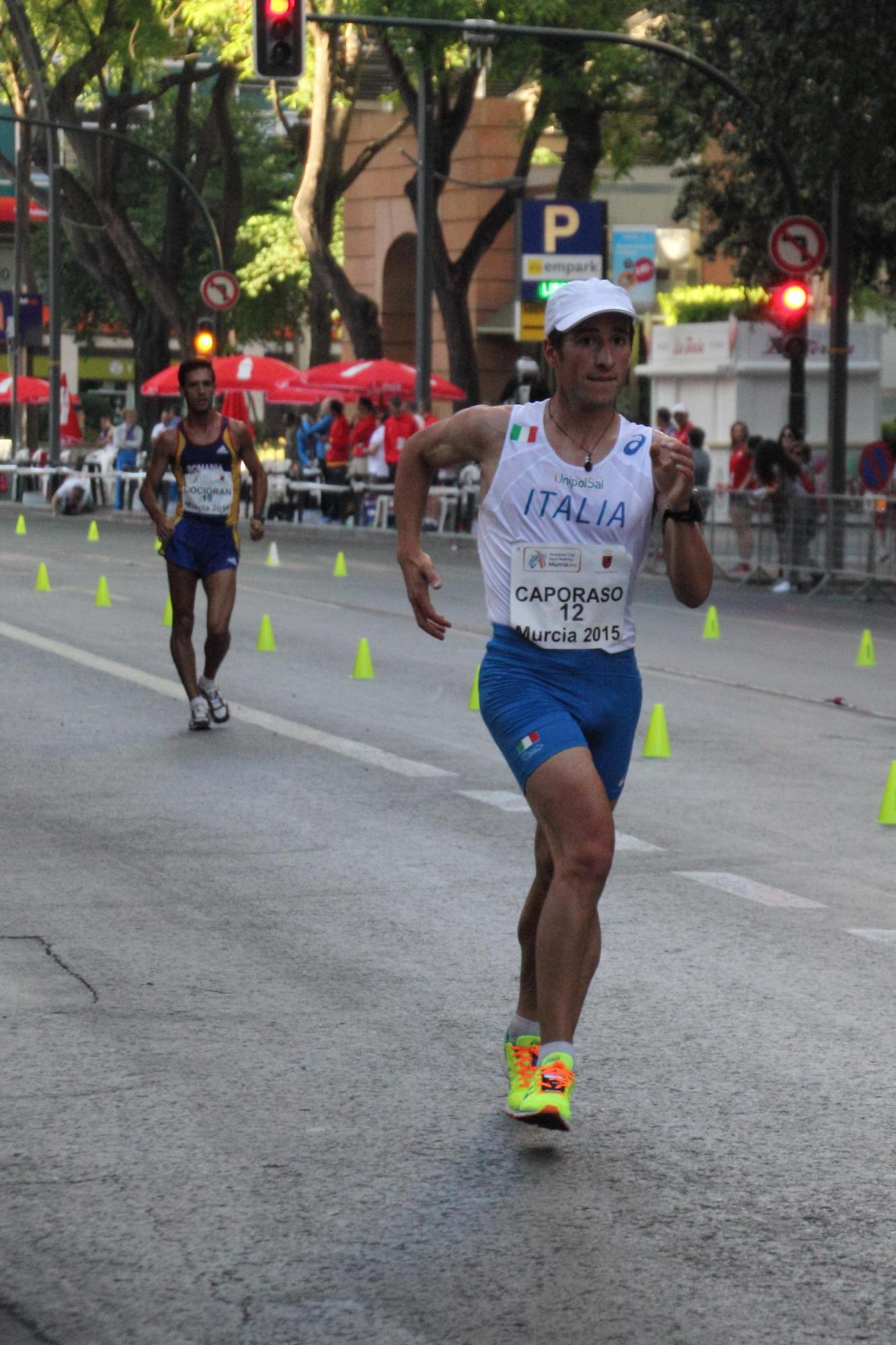
- Caporaso at the 2015 European Cup Race Walking

Personal information
- National team: Italy (13 caps)
- Born: 14 September 1987 (age 38) Benevento, Italy
- Height: 166 cm (5 ft 5 in)
- Weight: 60 kg (132 lb)

Sport
- Country: Italy
- Sport: Athletics
- Event: Racewalking
Medal record
Event	1st	2nd	3rd
World Race Walking Cup	1	0	0
European Race Walking Cup	1	2	0
Total	2	2	0
- Updated on 21 September 2019

Teodorico Caporaso (born 14 September 1987) is a male Italian racewalker who won four international medals at senior level at the race walk competitions. He competed at the 2020 Summer Olympics in 50 km walk.

== Biography ==
He competed in the 50 kilometres walk event at the 2015 World Championships in Athletics in Beijing, China.

In 2019, he competed in the men's 50 kilometres walk at the 2019 World Athletics Championships held in Doha, Qatar. He did not finish his race.

He won his first national title on 50 km with a time of 4:01:04 in Ostia on 23 January 2021.

== Achievements ==
Year	Competition	Venue	Position	Event	Performance	Notes
2011	European Cup	(Portugal) Olhão	10th	50 km		
2011	European Cup	(Portugal) Olhão	1st	50 km team		
2015	European Cup	(Spain) Murcia	6th	50 km		
2015	European Cup	(Spain) Murcia	2nd	50 km team		
2016	World Team Championships	(Italy) Rome	4th	50 km	3:48:29	PB
2016	World Team Championships	(Italy) Rome	1st	50 km team		
2017	European Cup	(Czech Republic) Poděbrady	5th	50 km		
2017	European Cup	(Czech Republic) Poděbrady	2nd	50 km team		

== See also ==
- Italy at the IAAF World Race Walking Cup
- Italy at the European Race Walking Cup
