= Ivan Banzeruk =

Ukrainian racewalker (born 1990)

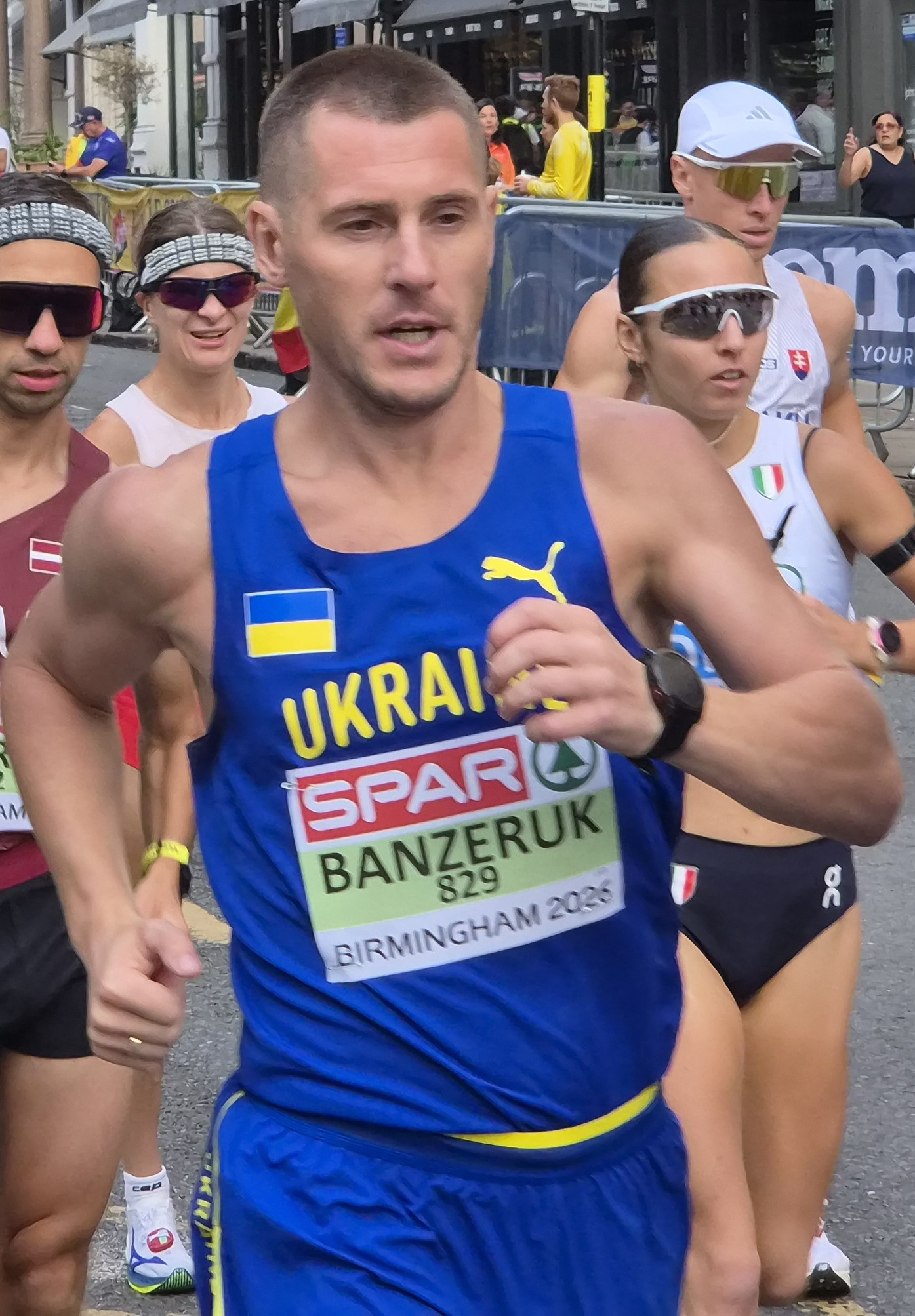
- Banzeruk at the 2026 European Championships

Personal information
- Born: 9 February 1990 (age 36) Voyehoshcha, Volyn Oblast, Ukrainian SSR, Soviet Union

Sport
- Country: Ukraine
- Sport: Track and field
- Event: racewalking
- Updated on 29 August 2015

Ivan Mykolayovych Banzeruk (Ukrainian: Іван Миколайович Банзерук; born 9 February 1990) is a Ukrainian racewalker.

== Career ==
He competed in the 50 kilometres walk event at the 2013 World Championships in Athletics. He also competed in the 50 kilometres walk event at the 2015 World Championships in Athletics in Beijing, China, where he finished in 15th place. In 2019, he competed in the men's 50 kilometres walk at the 2019 World Athletics Championships held in Doha, Qatar. He did not finish his race.

== See also ==
- Ukraine at the 2015 World Championships in Athletics
