= Dušan Majdán =

Slovak racewalker

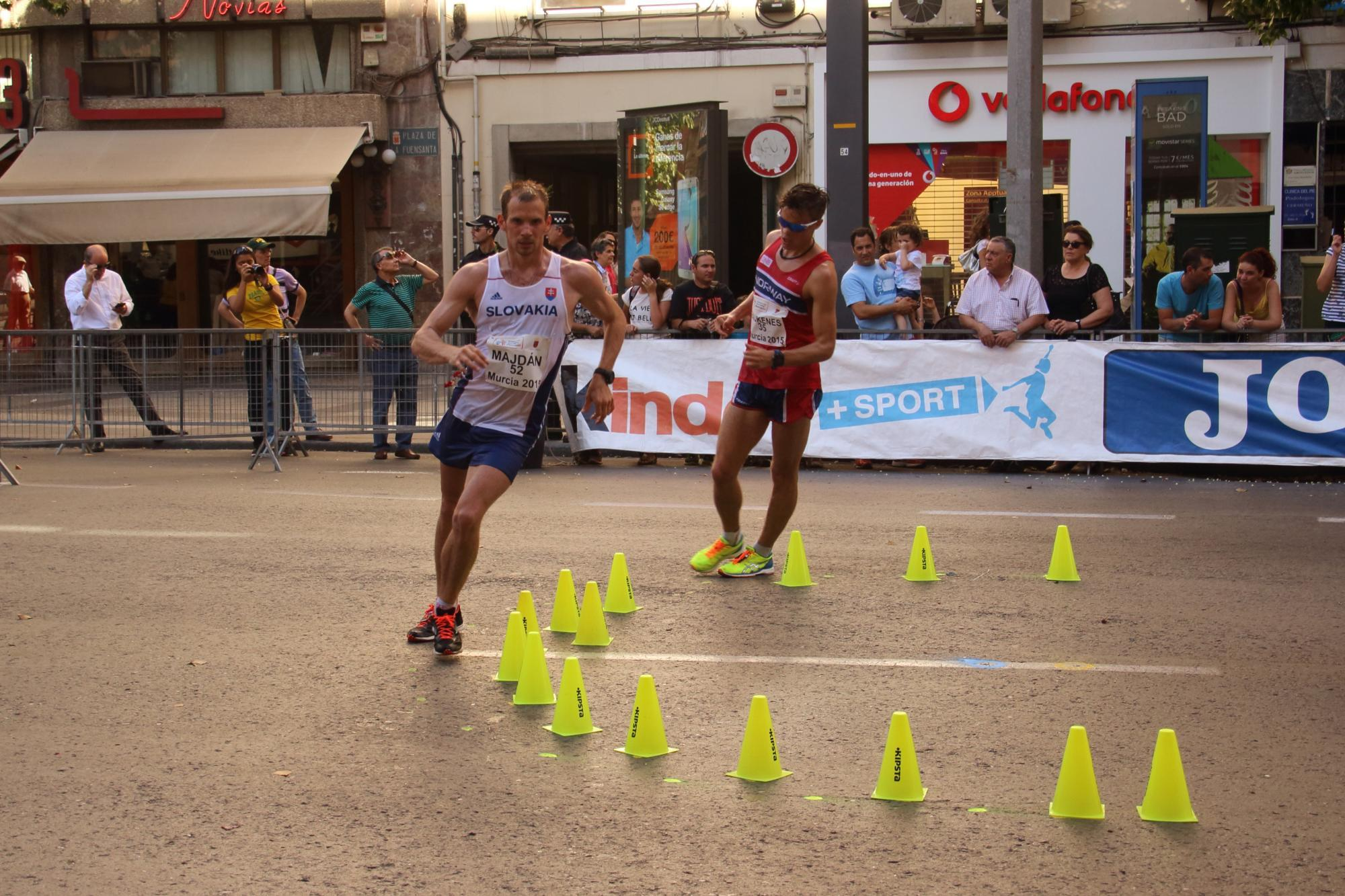
- Majdán (left) at the 2015 European Cup Race Walking

Personal information
- Born: 8 September 1987 (age 38) Hnúšťa, Slovakia

Sport
- Country: Slovakia
- Sport: Track and field
- Event: racewalking
- Updated on 29 August 2015

Dušan Majdán (born 8 September 1987) is a Slovak racewalker. He competed in the 50 kilometres walk event at the 2013 World Championships in Athletics. He also competed in the 50 kilometres walk event at the 2015 World Championships in Athletics in Beijing, China.

In 2018, he competed in the men's 50 kilometres walk at the 2018 European Athletics Championships held in Berlin, Germany. He finished in 15th place.

== See also ==
- Slovakia at the 2015 World Championships in Athletics
