= Carl Dohmann =

German racewalker (born 1990)

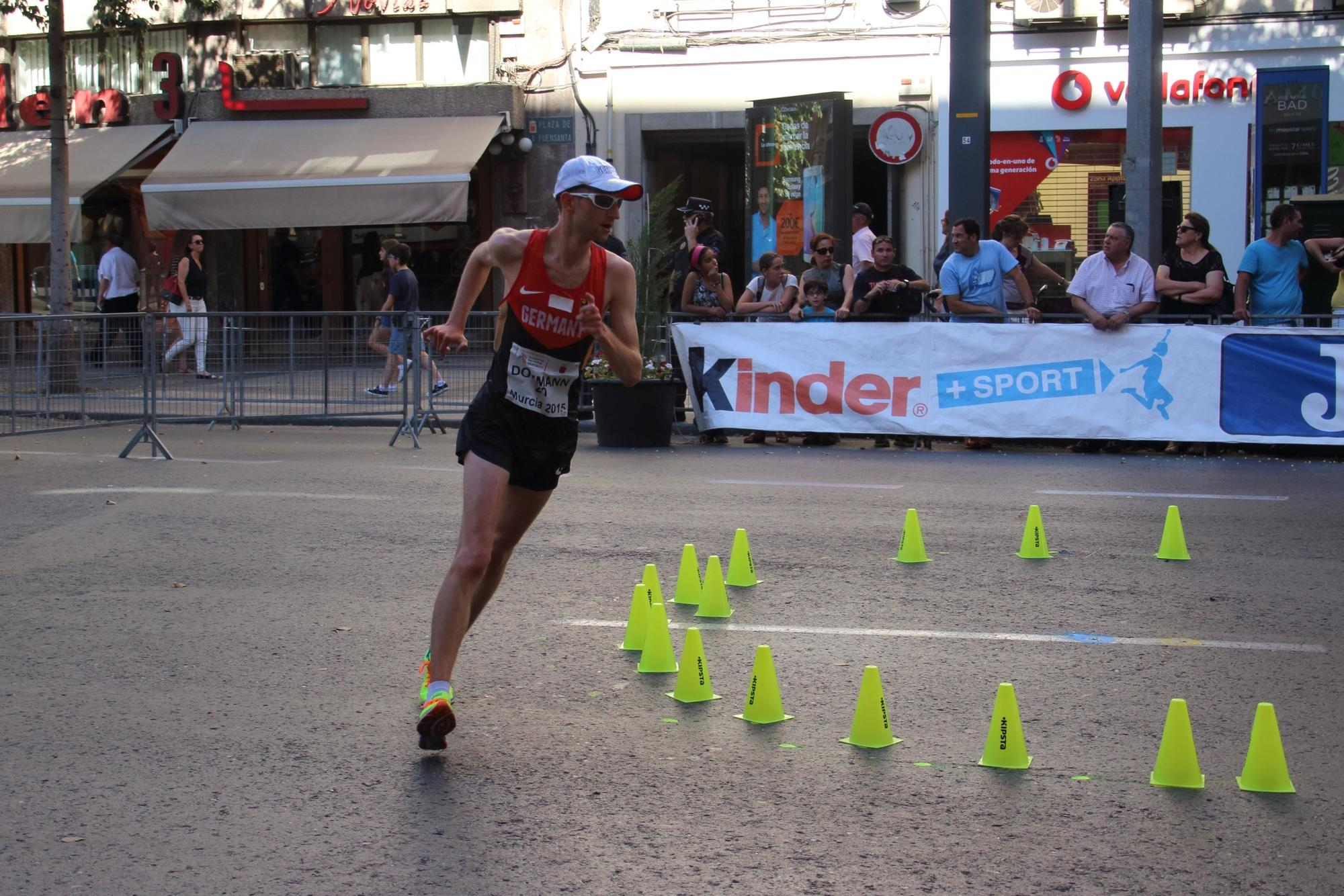
- Dohmann at the 2015 European Cup Race Walking

Personal information
- Born: 18 May 1990 (age 36)
- Height: 182 cm (6 ft 0 in)
- Weight: 60 kg (132 lb)

Sport
- Country: Germany
- Sport: Track and field
- Event: Racewalking
- Updated on 29 August 2015

Carl Dohmann (born 18 May 1990) is a male German racewalker. He competed in the 50 kilometres walk event at the 2015 World Championships in Athletics in Beijing, China, but did not finish. At the 2016 Summer Olympics, he competed in the 50 km walk, but did not finish the race.

In 2018, he competed in the men's 50 kilometres walk at the 2018 European Athletics Championships held in Berlin, Germany. He finished in 5th place.

== See also ==
- Germany at the 2015 World Championships in Athletics
