= 2017 European Race Walking Cup =

Walking race

- Organisers: EAA
- Edition: 12th
- Date: 21 May
- Host city: Poděbrady, Czech Republic
- Events: 5
- Participation: 223 athletes from 27 nations
- Official website: https://www.podebrady2017.com/en/

The 2017 European Race Walking Cup took place on 21 May 2017. The races were held on a 1 km lap around the city park in Poděbrady, Czech Republic.

== Medallists ==
Event	Gold		Silver		Bronze	
Individual
Men's 20 km	Christopher Linke; Germany	1:19:28	Miguel Ángel López; Spain	1:20:21	Perseus Karlström; Sweden	1:20:40
Men's 50 km	Ivan Banzeruk; Ukraine	3:48:15	Ihor Hlavan; Ukraine	3:48:38	Michele Antonelli; Italy	3:49:07
Men's 10 km Junior (U20)	Leo Köpp; Germany	41:08	Mikita Kaliada; Belarus	41:19	Łukasz Niedziałek; Poland	41:28
Women's 20 km	Antonella Palmisano; Italy	1:27:57 SB	Ana Cabecinha; Portugal	1:29:44	Laura García-Caro; Spain	1:29:57
Women's 10 km Junior (U20)	Yana Smerdova; Authorised Neutral Athlete	46:39	Meryem Bekmez; Turkey	46:48	Teresa Zurek; Germany	46:51
Team
Men's 20 km	Spain	30	Germany	35	Ireland	45
Men's 50 km	Ukraine	9	Italy	19	Spain	34
Men's 10 km Junior (U20)	Belarus	9	France	11	Ukraine	14
Women's 20 km	Spain	18	Italy	34	Lithuania	36
Women's 10 km Junior (U20)	Spain	10	Greece	12	Germany	14

== Race results ==
=== Men's 20 km ===
Individual race
Rank	Athlete	Country	Time	Notes
1st place, gold medalist(s)	Christopher Linke	Germany	1:19:28	
2nd place, silver medalist(s)	Miguel Ángel López	Spain	1:20:21	SB
3rd place, bronze medalist(s)	Perseus Karlström	Sweden	1:20:40	SB
4	Tom Bosworth	Great Britain	1:21:21	
5	Marius Žiūkas	Lithuania	1:21:38	
6	Alex Wright	Ireland	1:21:48	
7	Diego García	Spain	1:21:56	SB
8	Giorgio Rubino	Italy	1:22:05	SB
9	Artur Brzozowski	Poland	1:22:14	
10	Callum Wilkinson	Great Britain	1:22:17	PB
11	Dzmitry Dziubin	Belarus	1:22:21	SB
12	Sergey Shirobokov	Authorised Neutral Athletes	1:22:21	
13	Robert Heffernan	Ireland	1:22:40	SB
14	João Vieira	Portugal	1:22:42	SB
15	Aliaksandr Liakhovich	Belarus	1:23:00	
16	Nils Brembach	Germany	1:23:04	
17	Ivan Losev	Ukraine	1:23:13	SB
18	Hagen Pohle	Germany	1:23:24	
19	Serhiy Budza	Ukraine	1:23:26	PB
20	Damian Błocki	Poland	1:23:28	PB
21	Manuel Bermúdez	Spain	1:23:30	
22	Miguel Carvalho	Portugal	1:23:31	PB
23	Jakub Jelonek	Poland	1:23:45	
24	Aurélien Quinion	France	1:23:47	PB
25	Alexandros Papamichail	Greece	1:23:53	
26	Cian McManamon	Ireland	1:24:03	PB
27	Jonathan Hilbert	Germany	1:24:43	
28	Francesco Fortunato	Italy	1:24:49	
29	Marco De Luca	Italy	1:25:02	
30	Salih Korkmaz	Turkey	1:25:24	
31	Álvaro Martín	Spain	1:25:53	
32	Rafał Sikora	Poland	1:25:55	SB
33	Yauheni Zalesski	Belarus	1:26:12	
34	Genadij Kozlovskij	Lithuania	1:26:40	
35	Mert Atlı	Turkey	1:26:49	SB
36	Cameron Corbishley	Great Britain	1:27:26	
37	Alex Flórez	Switzerland	1:27:35	SB
38	Milan Rízek	Slovakia	1:28:05	
39	Bence Venyercsán	Hungary	1:28:14	
40	Serkan Dogan	Turkey	1:28:38	
41	Miroslav Úradník	Slovakia	1:28:43	SB
42	Andrei Gafita	Romania	1:28:43	
43	Ruslans Smolonskis	Latvia	1:28:59	PB
44	Andriy Kovenko	Ukraine	1:29:00	
45	Elmo Koivunen	Finland	1:29:02	SB
46	Raivo Saulgriezis	Latvia	1:29:10	
47	Dominic King	Great Britain	1:29:28	SB
48	Jean Blancheteau	France	1:30:04	
49	Fredrik Vaeng Røtnes	Norway	1:30:59	
50	Marius Cocioran	Romania	1:31:22	
51	Oleksiy Kazanin	Ukraine	1:31:34	
52	Tomasz Bagdány	Hungary	1:32:50	
53	Ersin Tacir	Turkey	1:33:09	
54	Edgars Gjačs	Latvia	1:33:47	SB
55	Soma Kovács	Hungary	1:33:55	
56	Sándor Rácz	Hungary	1:34:30	
57	Aigars Salenieks	Latvia	1:39:16	SB
58	Virgo Adusoo	Estonia	1:43:40	SB
59	Lauri Lelumees	Estonia	1:47:26	SB
	Leonardo Dei Tos	Italy	DNF	
	Vít Hlaváč	Czech Republic	DNF	
	Fabian Bernabe	France	DNF	
	Narcis Mihaila	Romania	DNF	
	Tadas Šuškevičius	Lithuania	DNF	
	Dušan Majdán	Slovakia	DNF	
	Kévin Campion	France	DQ	
	Håvard Haukenes	Norway	DQ	
	Veli-Matti Partanen	Finland	DQ	

Teams
Rank	Team	Points
1st place, gold medalist(s)	Spain	30
2nd place, silver medalist(s)	Germany	35
3rd place, bronze medalist(s)	Ireland	45
4	Great Britain	50
5	Poland	52
6	Belarus	59
7	Italy	65
8	Ukraine	80
9	Turkey	105
10	Latvia	143
11	Hungary	146

=== Men's 50 km ===
Individual race
Rank	Athlete	Country	Time	Notes
1st place, gold medalist(s)	Ivan Banzeruk	Ukraine	3:48:15	SB
2nd place, silver medalist(s)	Ihor Hlavan	Ukraine	3:48:38	SB
3rd place, bronze medalist(s)	Michele Antonelli	Italy	3:49:07	PB
4	Brendan Boyce	Ireland	3:49:49	SB
5	Teodorico Caporaso	Italy	3:52:14	SB
6	Maryan Zakalnytskyy	Ukraine	3:53:50	PB
7	Nathaniel Seiler	Germany	3:55:13	PB
8	Pedro Isidro	Portugal	3:56:38	SB
9	Francisco Arcilla	Spain	3:56:39	PB
10	Iván Pajuelo	Spain	3:56:47	PB
11	Andrea Agrusti	Italy	3:58:08	SB
12	Andriy Hrechkovskyy	Ukraine	3:58:35	SB
13	Anders Hansson	Sweden	3:58:35	PB
14	Federico Tontodonati	Italy	4:00:39	SB
15	Luis Manuel Corchete	Spain	4:01:39	SB
16	Artur Mastianica	Lithuania	4:01:56	PB
17	Florin Alin Stirbu	Romania	4:03:36	PB
18	Karl Junghannß	Germany	4:07:23	SB
19	Lukáš Gdula	Czech Republic	4:13:40	SB
20	Dávid Tokodi	Hungary	4:14:41	SB
21	Carl Dohmann	Germany	4:17:19	SB
22	Bruno Erent	Croatia	4:19:22	
23	Remo Karlström	Sweden	4:32:42	PB
	Damien Molmy	France	DNF	
	Benjamín Sánchez	Spain	DNF	
	Miklós Srp	Hungary	DQ	
	Aleksi Ojala	Finland	DQ	
	Ato Ibáñez	Sweden	DQ	

Teams
Rank	Team	Points
1st place, gold medalist(s)	Ukraine	9
2nd place, silver medalist(s)	Italy	19
3rd place, bronze medalist(s)	Spain	34
4	Germany	46

=== Men's 10 km (U20) ===
Individual race
Rank	Athlete	Country	Time	Notes
1st place, gold medalist(s)	Leo Köpp	Germany	41:08	PB
2nd place, silver medalist(s)	Mikita Kaliada	Belarus	41:19	PB
3rd place, bronze medalist(s)	Łukasz Niedziałek	Poland	41:28	PB
4	Viktor Shumik	Ukraine	41:38	PB
5	David Kuster	France	42:02	
6	Justin Bournier	France	42:14	PB
7	Stanislau Kuzmich	Belarus	42:18	PB
8	Abdulselam Imük	Turkey	42:25	PB
9	Giacomo Brandi	Italy	42:46	SB
10	Eduard Zabuzhenko	Ukraine	42:47	PB
11	José Manuel Pérez	Spain	42:58	PB
12	Riccardo Orsoni	Italy	43:15	PB
13	Abdulaziz Danis	Turkey	44:08	
14	Viktor Kononenko	Ukraine	44:10	PB
15	Bálint Sárossi	Hungary	44:13	
16	Johannes Frenzl	Germany	44:15	PB
17	Pedro Conesa	Spain	44:17	PB
18	Stefan Cristian Mangu	Romania	44:18	SB
19	Christopher Snook	Great Britain	44:23	PB
20	Jan Stramka	Germany	44:33	PB
21	Natanael Rotaru	Romania	44:41	PB
22	Ryan Gognies	France	44:53	PB
23	Daniel Jimeno	Spain	45:08	PB
24	Robert Goławski	Poland	45:19	PB
25	Umut Temel	Turkey	45:27	PB
26	Vojtěch Libnar	Czech Republic	45:28	PB
27	Ľubomír Kubiš	Slovakia	46:05	PB
28	Joni Hava	Finland	46:51	
29	Dávid Varga	Hungary	47:45	PB
30	Ruslan Sergatsjov	Estonia	47:50	PB
31	Paulius Juozaitis	Lithuania	48:24	PB
32	Davide Finocchietti	Italy	48:27	
33	Daniel Kováč	Slovakia	48:32	
34	Norbert Tóth	Hungary	48:34	PB
35	Arminas Rudenka	Lithuania	49:38	
36	Rodrigo Marques	Portugal	50:11	
37	Nathan Bonzon	Switzerland	50:59	
	Michał Wiater	Poland	DNF	

Teams
Rank	Team	Points
1st place, gold medalist(s)	Ukraine	28
2nd place, silver medalist(s)	France	33
3rd place, bronze medalist(s)	Germany	37
4	Turkey	46
5	Spain	51
6	Italy	53
7	Hungary	78

=== Women's 20 km ===
Individual race
Rank	Athlete	Country	Time	Notes
1st place, gold medalist(s)	Antonella Palmisano	Italy	1:27:57	SB
2nd place, silver medalist(s)	Ana Cabecinha	Portugal	1:29:44	SB
3rd place, bronze medalist(s)	Laura García-Caro	Spain	1:29:57	SB
4	Inna Kashyna	Ukraine	1:30:11	PB
5	Nadiya Borovska	Ukraine	1:30:26	SB
6	María Pérez	Spain	1:30:52	SB
7	Valentina Trapletti	Italy	1:30:58	PB
8	Brigita Virbalytė-Dimšienė	Lithuania	1:31:32	
9	Lidia Sánchez-Puebla	Spain	1:32:09	
10	Émilie Menuet	France	1:32:32	
11	Živilė Vaiciukevičiūtė	Lithuania	1:32:42	
12	Barbara Kovács	Hungary	1:33:43	PB
13	Viktoryia Rashchupkina	Belarus	1:33:46	PB
14	Gemma Bridge	Great Britain	1:34:24	PB
15	Despina Zapounidou	Greece	1:34:26	SB
16	Emilia Lehmeyer	Germany	1:34:31	PB
17	Monika Vaiciukevičiūtė	Lithuania	1:34:57	PB
18	Mara Ribeiro	Portugal	1:35:45	PB
19	Elisa Neuvonen	Finland	1:35:48	
20	Paulina Buziak	Poland	1:35:50	
21	Amanda Cano	Spain	1:35:53	
22	Bethan Davies	Great Britain	1:36:04	
23	Ana Veronica Rodean	Romania	1:36:06	SB
24	Rita Récsei	Hungary	1:36:57	
25	Marine Quennehen	France	1:37:17	
26	Nicole Colombi	Italy	1:37:26	SB
27	Nadzeya Darazhuk	Belarus	1:37:50	
28	Olena Mizernyuk	Ukraine	1:38:26	
29	Corinne Baudoin	France	1:38:53	
30	Kristina Saltanovič	Lithuania	1:38:58	
31	Dušica Topić	Serbia	1:39:14	NR
32	Laura Polli	Switzerland	1:39:57	
33	Joanna Bemowska	Poland	1:40:17	
34	Mihaela Acatrinei	Romania	1:40:47	SB
35	Valentyna Myronchuk	Ukraine	1:40:55	
36	Olga Niedziałek	Poland	1:41:30	
37	Nastassia Rodzkina	Belarus	1:42:24	
38	Agnese Pastare	Latvia	1:43:38	SB
39	Heather Lewis	Great Britain	1:44:41	
40	Anett Torma	Hungary	1:47:31	
41	Mihaela Puscasu	Romania	1:51:52	
42	Anna Tipukina	Estonia	1:58:45	PB
43	Andrea Scheibl	Austria	2:12:18	PB
	Kathrin Schulze	Austria	DNF	
	Panayiota Tsinopoulou	Greece	DNF	
	Katarzyna Golba	Poland	DNF	
	Clemence Beretta	France	DNF	
	Antigoni Drisbioti	Greece	DNF	
	Sibilla Di Vincenzo	Italy	DQ	
	Inês Henriques	Portugal	DQ	
	Lena Ungerböck	Austria	DQ	
	Lucia Čubaňová	Slovakia	DQ	

Teams
Rank	Team	Points
1st place, gold medalist(s)	Spain	18
2nd place, silver medalist(s)	Italy	34
3rd place, bronze medalist(s)	Lithuania	36
4	Ukraine	37
5	France	64
6	Great Britain	75
7	Hungary	76
8	Belarus	77
9	Poland	89
10	Romania	98

=== Women's 10 km (U20) ===
Individual race
Rank	Athlete	Country	Time	Notes
1st place, gold medalist(s)	Yana Smerdova	Authorised Neutral Athletes	46:39	SB
2nd place, silver medalist(s)	Meryem Bekmez	Turkey	46:48	
3rd place, bronze medalist(s)	Teresa Zurek	Germany	46:51	
4	Marina Peña	Spain	48:02	PB
5	Sofia Alikanioti	Greece	48:16	PB
6	Irene Montejo	Spain	48:35	
7	Dimitra Bohori	Greece	48:45	SB
8	Inês Reis	Portugal	48:48	PB
9	Antia Chamosa	Spain	48:52	
10	Carolina Costa	Portugal	49:15	
11	Julia Richter	Germany	49:38	
12	Eloise Terrec	France	49:43	
13	Darya Khusayinova	Ukraine	50:03	=PB
14	Annalisa Russo	Italy	50:33	PB
15	Zuzanna Drygalska	Poland	50:37	
16	Austėja Kavaliauskaitė	Lithuania	50:47	
17	Athanasia Vaitsi	Greece	50:59	
18	Enni Nurmi	Finland	51:00	
19	Ayşe Tekdal	Turkey	51:27	
20	Julia Henze	Germany	51:38	
21	Orla O'Connor	Ireland	51:39	
22	Daphne Dimanopulosz	Hungary	51:50	
23	Kseniya Byelova	Ukraine	51:52	SB
24	Anthea Mirabello	Italy	51:56	SB
25	Iryna Chernukha	Ukraine	52:25	PB
26	Małgorzata Cetnarska	Poland	53:11	
27	Niamh O'Connor	Ireland	53:29	
28	Andra Elena Botez	Romania	53:29	
29	Klaudia Žárska	Slovakia	53:32	
30	Angelica Mirabello	Italy	54:01	SB
31	Molly Jade Davey	Great Britain	54:02	
32	Dóra Csörgö	Hungary	54:56	PB
33	Ema Hačundová	Slovakia	55:24	
34	Laura Komoroczy	Hungary	57:53	
35	Angela Mandel	Estonia	59:44	PB
	Agata Kowalska	Poland	DNF	
	Camille Aurriere	France	DNF	

Teams
Rank	Team	Points
1st place, gold medalist(s)	Spain	19
2nd place, silver medalist(s)	Greece	29
3rd place, bronze medalist(s)	Germany	34
4	Ukraine	61
5	Italy	68
6	Hungary	88

== Medal table (unofficial) ==
* Host nation (Host nation)

Rank	Nation	Gold	Silver	Bronze	Total
1	Spain	3	1	2	6
2	Germany	2	1	2	5
3	Ukraine	2	1	1	4
4	Italy	1	2	1	4
5	Belarus	1	1	0	2
6	Authorised Neutral Athletes	1	0	0	1
7	France	0	1	0	1
7	Greece	0	1	0	1
7	Portugal	0	1	0	1
7	Turkey	0	1	0	1
11	Ireland	0	0	1	1
11	Lithuania	0	0	1	1
11	Poland	0	0	1	1
11	Sweden	0	0	1	1
Totals (14 entries)		10	10	10	30

- Note: Totals include both individual and team medals, with medals in the team competition counting as one medal.

== Participation ==
According to an unofficial count, 223 athletes from 27 countries participated.

- Austria (3)
- Authorised Neutral Athletes (2)
- Belarus (8)
- Croatia (1)
- Czech Republic (3)
- Estonia (5)
- Finland (6)
- France (14)
- Germany (14)
- Great Britain (9)
- Greece (7)
- Hungary (15)
- Ireland (6)
- Italy (18)
- Latvia (5)
- Lithuania (11)
- Norway (2)
- Poland (14)
- Portugal (9)
- Romania (10)
- Serbia (1)
- Slovakia (8)
- Spain (18)
- Sweden (4)
- Switzerland (3)
- Turkey (9)
- Ukraine (18)
