= 2021 European Race Walking Team Championships =

- Organisers: EAA
- Edition: 14th (1st with new name)
- Date: 16 May
- Host city: Poděbrady, Czech Republic
- Events: 6
- Participation: 212 athletes from 25 nations
- Official website: https://www.podebrady-walking.cz/en/

The 2021 European Race Walking Team Championships took place on 16 May 2021. The races were held on a 1 km lap around the city park of Poděbrady, Czech Republic. It was the first edition to be held under the new name of European Race Walking Team Championships (from 2021 on).

For the first time European Race Walking Cup also included women's 35 km racewalking event.

== Medallists ==
Event	Gold		Silver		Bronze	
Individual
Men's 20 km	Perseus Karlström; Sweden	1:18:54	Álvaro Martín; Spain	1:19:14; PB	Diego García; Spain	1:19:19; SB
Men's 50 km	Marc Tur; Spain	3:47:40; PB	Aleksi Ojala; Finland	3:48:25; SB	Andrea Agrusti; Italy	3:49:52 PB
Men's 10 km Junior (U20)	José Luis Hidalgo; Spain	41:35; PB	Paul McGrath; Spain	41:51	Serhat Güngör; Turkey	42:20
Women's 20 km	Antonella Palmisano; Italy	1:27:42	María Pérez; Spain	1:28:03; SB	Laura García-Caro; Spain	1:28:07; PB
Women's 35 km	Antigoni Drisbioti; Greece	2:49:55; PB	Eleonora Giorgi; Italy	2:51:05; SB	Lidia Barcella; Italy	2:51:50 PB
Women's 10 km Junior (U20)	Eliška Martínková; Czech Republic	45:37	Adriana Viveiros; Portugal	46:49	Maële Biré-Heslouis; France	47:53
Team
Men's 20 km	Spain	9	Italy	24	Germany	44
Men's 50 km	Italy	23	Germany	24	Ukraine	41
Men's 10 km Junior (U20)	Spain	3	France	12	Turkey	15
Women's 20 km	Spain	9	Ukraine	21	Italy	23
Women's 35 km	Italy	13	Greece	21	Belarus	27
Women's 10 km Junior (U20)	Portugal	7	France	7	Czech Republic	15

== Race results ==
=== Men's 20 km ===
Individual race

Rank	Athlete	Country	Time	Notes
1st place, gold medalist(s)	Perseus Karlström	Sweden	1:18:54	
2nd place, silver medalist(s)	Álvaro Martín	Spain	1:18:54	PB
3rd place, bronze medalist(s)	Diego García	Spain	1:19:19	SB
4	Miguel Ángel López	Spain	1:19:25	SB
5	Francesco Fortunato	Italy	1:19:43	PB
6	Gabriel Bordier	France	1:20:10	PB
7	Salih Korkmaz	Turkey	1:20:10	
8	Massimo Stano	Italy	1:20:30	SB
9	Eduard Zabuzhenko	Ukraine	1:20:43	
10	Nils Brembach	Germany	1:20:52	SB
11	Federico Tontodonati	Italy	1:21:13	
12	Matteo Giupponi	Italy	1:21:52	
13	Christopher Linke	Germany	1:22:20	SB
14	Łukasz Niedziałek	Poland	1:22:26	
15	Tom Bosworth	Great Britain	1:22:27	SB
16	Ivan Losev	Ukraine	1:22:41	
17	Şahin Şenoduncu	Turkey	1:22:44	SB
18	Cam Corbishley	Great Britain	1:22:50	PB
19	Viktor Shumik	Ukraine	1:23:39	SB
20	Leo Köpp	Germany	1:23:44	SB
21	Marius Žiūkas	Lithuania	1:23:57	
22	Aliaksandr Liakhovich	Belarus	1:24:09	
23	Abdulselam İmük	Turkey	1:24:14	
24	Hagen Pohle	Germany	1:24:49	SB
25	Dawid Tomala	Poland	1:24:54	SB
26	Håvard Haukenes	Norway	1:25:05	SB
27	Selman Ilhan	Turkey	1:25:30	SB
28	Kévin Campion	France	1:25:31	SB
29	Arturas Mastianica	Lithuania	1:25:59	SB
30	Rafał Augustyn	Poland	1:26:08	
31	Miroslav Úradník	Slovakia	1:26:39	SB
32	David Kuster	France	1:27:21	
33	Dominik Černý	Slovakia	1:27:28	SB
34	Mikita Kaliada	Belarus	1:27:35	
35	Vít Hlaváč	Czech Republic	1:27:42	SB
36	Damian Błocki	Poland	1:27:59	
37	Raivo Saulgriezis	Latvia	1:28:44	SB
38	Dzmitry Dziubin	Belarus	1:30:37	
39	Lukáš Gdula	Czech Republic	1:30:57	SB
40	Cian McManamon	Ireland	1:31:48	
41	Mattéo Duc	France	1:32:13	PB
42	Dániel Kováč	Slovakia	1:41:22	
43	Paul Jansen	Netherlands	1:42:35	SB
44	Norbert Tóth	Hungary	1:48:28	
	Joni Hava	Finland	DNF	
	Máté Helebrandt	Hungary	DNF	
	Dzmitry Lukyanchuk	Belarus	DNF	
	Alberto Amezcua	Spain	DNF	

Team race

Rank	Country	Points
1st place, gold medalist(s)	Spain	9
2nd place, silver medalist(s)	Italy	24
3rd place, bronze medalist(s)	Germany	43
4	Ukraine	44
5	Turkey	47
6	France	66
7	Poland	69
8	Belarus	94
9	Slovakia	106

=== Women's 20 km ===
Individual race

Rank	Athlete	Country	Time	Notes
1st place, gold medalist(s)	Antonella Palmisano	Italy	1:27:42	
2nd place, silver medalist(s)	María Pérez	Spain	1:28:03	SB
3rd place, bronze medalist(s)	Laura García-Caro	Spain	1:28:07	PB
4	Raquel González	Spain	1:28:37	SB
5	Ayşe Tekdal	Turkey	1:29:47	PB
6	Olena Sobchuk	Ukraine	1:29:54	SB
7	Hanna Shevchuk	Ukraine	1:29:56	
8	Lyudmyla Olyanovska	Ukraine	1:29:56	
9	Katarzyna Zdziebło	Poland	1:29:57	PB
10	Valentina Trapletti	Italy	1:30:05	
11	Panayiota Tsinopoulou	Greece	1:32:24	SB
12	Nicole Colombi	Italy	1:32:40	SB
13	Anastasiya Rarouskaya	Belarus	1:32:45	PB
14	Evin Demir	Turkey	1:32:53	
15	Olga Niedziałek	Poland	1:33:26	PB
16	Viktoryia Rashchupkina	Belarus	1:33:51	SB
17	Heather Lewis	Great Britain	1:34:13	PB
18	Mária Czaková	Slovakia	1:34:27	SB
19	Brigita Virbalytė	Lithuania	1:34:40	
20	Júlia Takács	Spain	1:34:55	
21	Pauline Stey	France	1:34:58	PB
22	Eloise Terrec	France	1:35:04	PB
23	Meryem Bekmez	Turkey	1:35:12	
24	Camille Moutard	France	1:35:26	PB
25	Kader Dost	Turkey	1:36:14	
26	Barbara Kovács	Hungary	1:36:19	
27	Clémence Beretta	France	1:36:39	SB
28	Olga Fiaska	Greece	1:36:51	PB
29	Bethan Davies	Great Britain	1:37:09	
30	Saskia Feige	Germany	1:37:49	
31	Elisa Neuvonen	Finland	1:37:57	SB
32	Rita Récsei	Hungary	1:38:00	SB
33	Anniina Kivimäki	Finland	1:38:16	PB
34	Adrija Meškauskaitė	Lithuania	1:38:27	PB
35	Tiia Kuikka	Finland	1:39:23	
36	Valeryia Komel	Belarus	1:39:33	
37	Hana Burzalová	Slovakia	1:39:58	PB
38	Monika Vaiciukevičiūtė	Lithuania	1:40:16	
39	Mihaela Acatrinei	Romania	1:42:37	
40	Agnieszka Ellward	Poland	1:42:52	
41	Ema Hačundová	Slovakia	1:43:24	PB
42	Austėja Kavaliauskaitė	Lithuania	1:45:25	PB
43	Modra Ignate	Latvia	1:47:59	SB
44	Dóra Csörgő	Hungary	1:55:42	
	Eszter Bánhidi	Hungary	DNF	
	Ana Cabecinha	Portugal	DNF	
	Anna Terlyukevich	Belarus	DNF	
	Mariavittoria Becchetti	Italy	DQ	
	Maria Bernardo	Portugal	DQ	

Team race

Rank	Country	Points
1st place, gold medalist(s)	Spain	9
2nd place, silver medalist(s)	Ukraine	21
3rd place, bronze medalist(s)	Italy	23
4	Turkey	42
5	Poland	64
6	Belarus	65
7	France	67
8	Lithuania	91
9	Slovakia	96
10	Finland	99
11	Hungary	102

=== Women's 35 km ===
Individual race

Rank	Athlete	Country	Time	Notes
1st place, gold medalist(s)	Antigoni Drisbioti	Greece	2:49:55	PB
2nd place, silver medalist(s)	Eleonora Giorgi	Italy	2:51:05	SB
3rd place, bronze medalist(s)	Lidia Barcella	Italy	2:51:50	PB
4	María Juárez	Spain	2:52:44	PB
5	Nadzeya Darazhuk	Belarus	2:52:59	PB
6	Anastasiya Rodzkina	Belarus	2:55:07	PB
7	Kiriaki Filtisakou	Greece	2:55:10	PB
8	Federica Curiazzi	Italy	2:56:02	PB
9	Tereza Ďurdiaková	Czech Republic	2:57:08	PB
10	Christina Papadopoulou	Greece	2:57:29	PB
11	Antia Chamosa	Spain	2:57:51	PB
12	Nastassia Yatsevich	Belarus	2:58:01	PB
13	Ana Veronica Rodean	Romania	2:59:27	PB
14	Beatrice Foresti	Italy	3:04:04	PB
15	Antonina Lorek	Poland	3:12:30	PB
16	Efstathia Kourkoutsaki	Greece	3:14:13	
17	Khrystyna Yudkina	Ukraine	3:14:46	PB
18	Valéria Biróné Dr Molnár	Hungary	3:22:37	PB
	Yana Farina	Ukraine	DNF	
	Inês Henriques	Portugal	DNF	
	Lyudmyla Shelest	Ukraine	DQ	

Team race

Rank	Country	Points
1st place, gold medalist(s)	Italy	13
2nd place, silver medalist(s)	Greece	18
3rd place, bronze medalist(s)	Belarus	23

=== Men's 50 km ===
Individual race

Rank	Athlete	Country	Time	Notes
1st place, gold medalist(s)	Marc Tur	Spain	3:47:40	PB
2nd place, silver medalist(s)	Aleksi Ojala	Finland	3:48:25	SB
3rd place, bronze medalist(s)	Andrea Agrusti	Italy	3:49:52	PB
4	Ruslans Smolonskis	Latvia	3:50:31	PB
5	Marco De Luca	Italy	3:50:48	SB
6	Nathaniel Seiler	Germany	3:51:48	
7	Arnis Rumbenieks	Latvia	3:51:51	PB
8	Karl Junghannß	Germany	3:52:07	SB
9	Brendan Boyce	Ireland	3:52:15	SB
10	Carl Dohmann	Germany	3:52:58	
11	Ivan Banzeruk	Ukraine	3:53:51	SB
12	Marius Cocioran	Romania	3:55:29	NR
13	Valeriy Litanyuk	Ukraine	3:55:45	SB
14	Anatoli Homeleu	Belarus	3:55:58	PB
15	Michele Antonelli	Italy	3:56:18	SB
16	Jakub Jelonek	Poland	3:56:45	SB
17	Ihor Hlavan	Ukraine	3:58:12	SB
18	Rafał Fedaczyński	Poland	3:58:17	SB
19	Tadas Šuškevičius	Lithuania	3:59:35	SB
20	Jesús Ángel García	Spain	4:01:14	SB
21	Dávid Tokodi	Hungary	4:03:06	PB
22	Manuel Bermúdez	Spain	4:03:38	
23	Anton Radko	Ukraine	4:06:41	SB
24	Hélder Santos	Portugal	4:07:27	PB
25	Rui Coelho	Portugal	4:07:29	PB
26	José Ignacio Díaz	Spain	4:11:44	SB
27	Pavel Remus Rădoi	Romania	4:13:35	PB
28	Rafał Sikora	Poland	4:19:51	
29	Alejandro Francisco Florez Studer	Switzerland	4:22:37	SB
30	Ionuț Vasilică Pleșu	Romania	4:26:58	SB
	Virgo Adusoo	Estonia	DNF	
	Uladzimir Kalesnik	Belarus	DNF	
	Miklós Srp	Hungary	DNF	
	Narcis Mihăilă	Romania	DNF	
	Alexandros Papamichail	Greece	DNF	
	Bruno Erent	Croatia	DNF	
	Hugo Andrieu	France	DNF	
	Tomasz Bagdány	Hungary	DNF	
	Stefano Chiesa	Italy	DQ	

Team race

Rank	Country	Points
1st place, gold medalist(s)	Italy	23
2nd place, silver medalist(s)	Germany	24
3rd place, bronze medalist(s)	Ukraine	41
4	Spain	43
5	Poland	62
6	Romania	69

=== Men's 10 km (U20) ===
Individual race

Rank	Athlete	Country	Time	Notes
1st place, gold medalist(s)	Jose Luis Hidalgo	Spain	41:35	PB
2nd place, silver medalist(s)	Paul McGrath	Spain	41:51	
3rd place, bronze medalist(s)	Serhat Güngör	Turkey	42:20	
4	Dimitri Durand	France	42:26	=PB
5	Jaromír Morávek	Czech Republic	42:27	PB
6	Gabriele Gamba	Italy	42:30	PB
7	Pablo Pastor	Spain	42:43	
8	Lucas Dreville	France	42:46	PB
9	Pedro Dias	Portugal	42:51	PB
10	Taras Koretskyy	Ukraine	42:52	PB
11	Jerry Jokinen	Finland	43:06	PB
12	Mustafa Tekdal	Turkey	43:46	PB
13	Florian Peter	France	43:50	PB
14	Oleksandr Mytsyk	Ukraine	44:58	PB
15	Filippo Antonio Capostagno	Italy	45:54	SB
16	Yehor Shelest	Ukraine	46:17	PB
17	Ignas Dumbliauskas	Lithuania	48:12	PB
18	Leon Bánk	Hungary	53:07	SB
	Daniele Breda	Italy	DQ	

Team race

Rank	Country	Points
1st place, gold medalist(s)	Spain	3
2nd place, silver medalist(s)	France	12
3rd place, bronze medalist(s)	Turkey	15
4	Italy	21
5	Ukraine	24

=== Women's 10 km (U20) ===
Individual race

Rank	Athlete	Country	Time	Notes
1st place, gold medalist(s)	Eliška Martínková	Czech Republic	45:46	PB
2nd place, silver medalist(s)	Adriana Ornelas	Portugal	47:01	PB
3rd place, bronze medalist(s)	Maële Biré-Heslouis	France	47:05	NR
4	Elvina Carré	France	47:13	PB
5	Inês Mendes	Portugal	47:23	PB
6	Lizaveta Hryshkavich	Belarus	47:37	
7	Celia Ferrari	Spain	48:34	PB
8	Alicia Lumbreras	Spain	49:03	
9	Lena Riedel	Germany	49:33	PB
10	Alessia Titone	Italy	49:34	SB
11	Sina Riedel	Germany	49:58	PB
12	Anna Ferrari	Italy	50:01	
13	Alina Leipe	Germany	51:28	
14	Klára Hlaváčová	Czech Republic	51:35	
15	Francesca Liviani	Italy	51:42	PB
16	Bruna Marques	Portugal	51:55	SB
17	Jana Zikmundová	Czech Republic	53:13	
18	Songül Koçer	Turkey	53:34	
19	Kinga Waleriańczyk	Poland	53:43	PB
20	Amelia Błażejewska	Poland	53:59	PB
21	Stanislava Hakulinová	Slovakia	54:12	
22	Toma Dailidonytė	Lithuania	54:41	
	Maria Diana Lataretu	Romania	DNF	
	Alžbeta Ragasová	Slovakia	DQ	

Team race

Rank	Country	Points
1st place, gold medalist(s)	Portugal	7
2nd place, silver medalist(s)	France	7
3rd place, bronze medalist(s)	Czech Republic	15
4	Spain	15
5	Germany	20
6	Italy	22
7	Poland	39
	Slovakia	NM

== Participation ==
212 athletes from 25 countries registered for competition of which 200 eventually started.

- Austria (1)
- Belarus (14)
- Croatia (3)
- Czech Republic (3)
- Estonia (8)
- Finland (3)
- France (20)
- Germany (15)
- Great Britain (8)
- Greece (8)
- Hungary (11)
- Ireland (7)
- Italy (22)
- Latvia (5)
- Lithuania (13)
- Netherlands (1)
- Norway (1)
- Poland (13)
- Portugal (9)
- Romania (5)
- Serbia (1)
- Slovakia (8)
- Slovenia (1)
- Spain (22)
- Sweden (2)
- Switzerland (1)
- Turkey (11)
- Ukraine (22)

== Medal table ==
* Host nation (Czech Republic)

Rank	Nation	Gold	Silver	Bronze	Total
1	Spain	5	3	3	11
2	Italy	3	2	3	8
3	Greece	1	1	0	2
3	Portugal	1	1	0	2
5	Czech Republic*	1	0	0	1
5	Sweden	1	0	0	1
7	France	0	2	1	3
8	Germany	0	1	1	2
8	Ukraine	0	1	1	2
10	Finland	0	1	0	1
11	Turkey	0	0	2	2
12	Belarus	0	0	1	1
Totals (12 entries)		12	12	12	36
