= Athletics at the 2020 Summer Olympics – Men's 50 kilometres walk =

Men's 50 kilometres walk at the Games of the XXXII Olympiad
- Olympic Athletics
- Venue: Odori Park, Sapporo
- Date: 6 August 2021
- Competitors: 59 from 29 nations
- Winning time: 3:50:08

Medalists
1st place, gold medalist(s)		Dawid Tomala	Poland
2nd place, silver medalist(s)		Jonathan Hilbert	Germany
3rd place, bronze medalist(s)		Evan Dunfee	Canada

The men's 50 kilometres walk event at the 2020 Summer Olympics took place on 6 August 2021 in Sapporo. 59 athletes competed; the exact number was dependent on how many nations use universality places to enter athletes in addition to the number qualifying through time (no universality places were used in 2016).

== Background ==
This was the 20th appearance of the event: except for 1976, it has appeared at every Olympics since 1932. The reigning champion is Matej Tóth of Slovakia.

Due to the Olympics' movement towards gender equality (the 50 kilometres walk was the only men's event on the 2020 athletics programme with no women's equivalent) and declining fan attendance and TV ratings for the event, the men's 50 kilometres walk was replaced by a mixed-team marathon walk relay at the 2024 Summer Olympics.

== Qualification ==
A National Olympic Committee (NOC) could enter up to 3 qualified athletes in the men's 50 kilometres walk if all athletes meet the entry standard or qualify by ranking during the qualifying period. (The limit of 3 has been in place since the 1930 Olympic Congress.) The qualifying standard is 3:50:00. This standard was "set for the sole purpose of qualifying athletes with exceptional performances unable to qualify through the IAAF World Rankings pathway." The world rankings, based on the average of the best five results for the athlete over the qualifying period and weighted by the importance of the meet, will then be used to qualify athletes until the cap of 60 is reached.

The qualifying period was originally from 1 January 2019 to 31 May 2020. Due to the COVID-19 pandemic, the period was suspended from 6 April 2020 to 30 November 2020, with the end date extended to 31 May 2021. The most recent Area Championships may be counted in the ranking, even if not during the qualifying period. In July 2020, World Athletics announced that the suspension period would be lifted for the road events (marathons and race walks) on 1 September 2020.

NOCs can also use their universality place—each NOC can enter one male athlete regardless of time if they had no male athletes meeting the entry standard for an athletics event—in the 50 kilometres walk.

=== Men's 50km walk ===
Qualification standard	No. of athletes	NOC	Nominated athletes
Entry standard – 3:50:00	3	China	Bian Tongda; Luo Yadong; Wang Qin
Entry standard – 3:50:00	3	Germany	Carl Dohmann; Jonathan Hilbert; Nathaniel Seiler
Entry standard – 3:50:00	3	Italy	Andrea Agrusti; Teodorico Caporaso; Marco De Luca
Entry standard – 3:50:00	3	Japan	Hayato Katsuki; Masatora Kawano; Satoshi Maruo
Entry standard – 3:50:00	3	Poland	Rafał Augustyn; Artur Brzozowski; Dawid Tomala
Entry standard – 3:50:00	2	Colombia	Diego Pinzón; Jorge Ruiz
Entry standard – 3:50:00	2	Ecuador	Andrés Chocho; Claudio Villanueva
Entry standard – 3:50:00	2	Finland	Aleksi Ojala; Aku Partanen
Entry standard – 3:50:00	2	Guatemala	Bernardo Barrondo; Luis Ángel Sánchez
Entry standard – 3:50:00	2	Mexico	Isaac Palma; Horacio Nava
Entry standard – 3:50:00	2	Spain	Luis Manuel Corchete; Marc Tur
Entry standard – 3:50:00	2	Ukraine	Ivan Banzeruk; Maryan Zakalnytskyy
Entry standard – 3:50:00	1	Belarus	Dzmitry Dziubin
Entry standard – 3:50:00	1	Canada	Evan Dunfee
Entry standard – 3:50:00	1	France	Yohann Diniz
Entry standard – 3:50:00	1	Ireland	Brendan Boyce
Entry standard – 3:50:00	1	Lithuania	Arturas Mastianica
Entry standard – 3:50:00	1	New Zealand	Quentin Rew
Entry standard – 3:50:00	1	Norway	Håvard Haukenes
Entry standard – 3:50:00	1	Portugal	João Vieira
Entry standard – 3:50:00	1	Slovakia	Matej Tóth
World ranking	2	Czech Republic	Vít Hlaváč; Lukáš Gdula
World ranking	2	Hungary	Bence Venyercsán; Máté Helebrandt
World ranking	2	Latvia	Arnis Rumbenieks; Ruslans Smolonskis
World ranking	1	Australia	Rhydian Cowley
World ranking	1	Brazil	Caio Bonfim
World ranking	1	Canada	Mathieu Bilodeau
World ranking	1	Colombia	José Montaña
World ranking	1	Ecuador	Jhonatan Amores
World ranking	1	Finland	Jarkko Kinnunen
World ranking	1	Greece	Alexandros Papamichail
World ranking	1	Guatemala	Érick Bernabé Barrondo
World ranking	1	India	Gurpreet Singh
World ranking	1	Ireland	Alex Wright
World ranking	1	Mexico	José Leyver
World ranking	1	Romania	Marius Cocioran
World ranking	1	Slovakia	Michal Morvay
World ranking	1	South Africa	Marc Mundell
World ranking	1	Spain	Jesús Ángel García
World ranking	1	Ukraine	Ihor Hlavan
World ranking	60	30	Totals

== Competition format and course ==
The event consisted of a single race.

== Records ==
Prior to this competition, the existing world, Olympic, and area records were as follows.

World record	Yohann Diniz (FRA)	3:32:33	Zürich, Switzerland	15 August 2014
Olympic record	Jared Tallent (AUS)	3:36:53	London, United Kingdom	11 August 2012

Area	Time	Athlete	Nation
Africa (records)	3:54:12	Marc Mundell	South Africa
Asia (records)	3:36:06	Yu Chaohong	China
Europe (records)	3:32:33 WR	Yohann Diniz	France
North, Central America and Caribbean (records)	3:41:09	Erick Barrondo	Guatemala
Oceania (records)	3:35:47	Nathan Deakes	Australia
South America (records)	3:42:57	Andrés Chocho	Ecuador

== Schedule ==
All times are Japan Standard Time (UTC+9)

The men's 50 kilometres walk took place on a single day.

Date	Time	Round
Friday, 6 August 2021	5:30	Final

== Results ==
Key:	PB	Personal best	SB	Seasonal best	~	Loss of contact	>	Bent knee	TR 54.7.5	Disqualified by Rule TR 54.7.5

Rank	Athlete	Nation	Time	Notes
1st place, gold medalist(s)	Dawid Tomala	Poland	3:50:08	
2nd place, silver medalist(s)	Jonathan Hilbert	Germany	3:50:44	~~
3rd place, bronze medalist(s)	Evan Dunfee	Canada	3:50:59	SB
4	Marc Tur	Spain	3:51:08	>>
5	João Vieira	Portugal	3:51:28	SB
6	Masatora Kawano	Japan	3:51:56	SB
7	Bian Tongda	China	3:52:01	
8	Rhydian Cowley	Australia	3:52:01	PB
9	Aku Partanen	Finland	3:52:39	~ SB
10	Brendan Boyce	Ireland	3:53:40	
11	José Montaña	Colombia	3:53:50	SB
12	Artur Brzozowski	Poland	3:54:08	~ SB
13	Jorge Ruiz	Colombia	3:55:30	~
14	Matej Tóth	Slovakia	3:56:23	SB
15	José Leyver Ojeda	Mexico	3:56:53	~ SB
16	Quentin Rew	New Zealand	3:57:33	~
17	Máté Helebrandt	Hungary	3:57:53	~ SB
18	Diego Pinzón	Colombia	3:57:54	
19	Andrés Chocho	Ecuador	3:59:03	~>~ SB
20	Bence Venyercsán	Hungary	3:59:05	
21	Wang Qin	China	3:59:35	
22	Dzmitry Dziubin	Belarus	4:00:25	SB
23	Andrea Agrusti	Italy	4:01:10	
24	Marius Cocioran	Romania	4:01:43	
25	Maryan Zakalnytskyy	Ukraine	4:02:53	
26	Jarkko Kinnunen	Finland	4:04:28	>
27	Jhonatan Amores	Ecuador	4:05:47	
28	Luo Yadong	China	4:06:17	
29	Alex Wright	Ireland	4:06:20	~ SB
30	Hayato Katsuki	Japan	4:06:32	
31	Arturas Mastianica	Lithuania	4:06:43	
32	Satoshi Maruo	Japan	4:06:44	
33	Carl Dohmann	Germany	4:07:18	
34	Bernardo Barrondo	Guatemala	4:08:34	~~>
35	Jesús Ángel García	Spain	4:10:03	>
36	Alexandros Papamichail	Greece	4:12:49	
37	Arnis Rumbenieks	Latvia	4:13:33	>>
38	Aleksi Ojala	Finland	4:14:02	>
39	Valeriy Litanyuk	Ukraine	4:14:05	>
40	Marc Mundell	South Africa	4:14:37	
41	Michal Morvay	Slovakia	4:15:22	
42	Nathaniel Seiler	Germany	4:15:37	
43	Vít Hlaváč	Czech Republic	4:15:40	
44	Horacio Nava	Mexico	4:19:00	>>
45	Mathieu Bilodeau	Canada	4:20:36	SB
46	Lukáš Gdula	Czech Republic	4:33:06	>>>
47	Claudio Villanueva	Ecuador	4:53:09	>>
–	Teodorico Caporaso	Italy	DNF	~
–	Rafał Augustyn	Poland	DNF	
–	Håvard Haukenes	Norway	DNF	
–	Luis Manuel Corchete	Spain	DNF	
–	Gurpreet Singh	India	DNF	
–	Ivan Banzeruk	Ukraine	DNF	>>
–	Luis Ángel Sánchez	Guatemala	DNF	~~~
–	Isaac Palma	Mexico	DNF	~
–	Yohann Diniz	France	DNF	
–	Marco De Luca	Italy	DNF	
–	Ruslans Smolonskis	Latvia	DQ	~>>> TR 54.7.5
–	Érick Barrondo	Guatemala	DQ	~~~~ TR 54.7.5
