= 2024 European Athletics Championships – Men's 20 kilometres walk =

Men's 20 kilometres walk at the 2024 European Athletics Championships
- Venue: Stadio Olimpico
- Location: Rome
- Dates: 8 June (final)
- Competitors: 35 from 17 nations
- Winning time: 1:19:13

Medalists
gold medal	Perseus Karlström	Sweden
silver medal	Paul McGrath	Spain
bronze medal	Francesco Fortunato	Italy

The men's 20 kilometres walk at the 2024 European Athletics Championships took place at the Stadio Olimpico on 8 June.

== Records ==
Standing records prior to the 2024 European Athletics Championships
World record	Yusuke Suzuki (JPN)	1:16:38	Nomi, Japan	15 March 2015
European record	Yohann Diniz (FRA)	1:17:02	Arles, France	8 March 2015
Championship record	Francisco Javier Fernández (ESP)	1:18:37	Munich, Germany	6 August 2002
World Leading	Koki Ikeda (JPN)	1:16:51	Kobe, Japan	18 February 2024
Europe Leading	Massimo Stano (ITA)	1:17:26	Taicang, China	3 March 2024

== Schedule ==
Date	Time	Round
8 June 2024	18:00	Final

All times are local times (UTC+2)

== Results ==
The start was at 18:00.

Rank	Name	Nationality	Time	Note
1st place, gold medalist(s)	Perseus Karlström	Sweden	1:19:13	
2nd place, silver medalist(s)	Paul McGrath	Spain	1:19:31	
3rd place, bronze medalist(s)	Francesco Fortunato	Italy	1:19:54	SB
4	Gabriel Bordier	France	1:20:45	
5	Veli-Matti Partanen	Finland	1:20:52	SB
6	Riccardo Orsoni	Italy	1:21:08	
7	Maher Ben Hlima	Poland	1:21:12	
8	Leo Köpp	Germany	1:21:19	
9	Callum Wilkinson	Great Britain	1:21:34	
10	Ihor Hlavan	Ukraine	1:22:03	
11	Kévin Campion	France	1:22:21	SB
12	Aurélien Quinion	France	1:22:38	
13	Dominik Černý	Slovakia	1:22:56	
14	Diego García Carrera	Spain	1:22:56	
15	Artur Brzozowski	Poland	1:23:05	
16	Máté Helebrandt	Hungary	1:23:22	
17	Serhii Svitlychnyi	Ukraine	1:23:49	SB
18	Vít Hlaváč	Czech Republic	1:23:53	
19	Miroslav Úradník	Slovakia	1:24:04	
20	Bence Venyercsán	Hungary	1:24:08	
21	Raivo Saulgriezis	Latvia	1:24:18	
22	Jerry Jokinen	Finland	1:24:41	=NU23R
23	Oisin Lane	Ireland	1:25:02	
24	Mazlum Demir	Turkey	1:26:33	
25	Nathaniel Seiler	Germany	1:27:42	
26	Ivan Banzeruk	Ukraine	1:28:25	SB
27	Norbert Tóth	Hungary	1:30:02	
	Hayrettin Yıldız	Turkey	DNF	
	Alexandros Papamichail	Greece	DNF	
	Gianluca Picchiottino	Italy	DNF	
	Christopher Linke	Germany	DNF	
	Alberto Amezcua	Spain	DNF	
	Salih Korkmaz	Turkey	DNF	
	Aleksi Ojala	Finland	DQ	
	Marius Žiūkas	Lithuania	DQ	
