= 2019 World Athletics Championships – Men's 50 kilometres walk =

Men's 50 kilometres walk at the 2019 World Championships
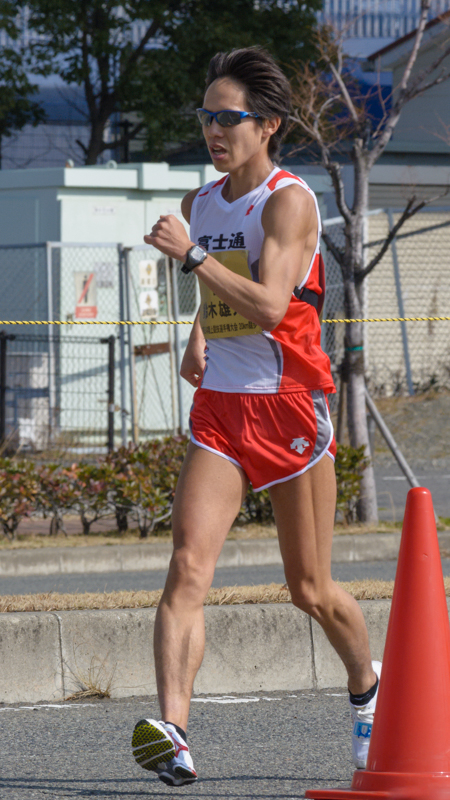
- Yusuke Suzuki, winner of the men's 50 kilometres walk.
- Venue: Khalifa International Stadium
- Dates: 28–29 September
- Competitors: 46 from 26 nations
- Winning time: 4:04:20

Medalists
gold medal	Yusuke Suzuki	Japan
silver medal	João Vieira	Portugal
bronze medal	Evan Dunfee	Canada

The men's 50 kilometres walk at the 2019 World Athletics Championships was held in Doha, Qatar, on 28–29 September 2019.

== Summary ==
This race marked the eleventh world championships for João Vieira, tying his contemporary teammate Susana Feitor for the second most. Feitor was only 16 at her first appearance, Vieira was 23 at his.

Based on the previous evening's marathon, the desert heat was going to affect the outcome. This race too started at midnight in order to avoid the heat of the day in Doha, that would mean temperatures hovered around 32 °C 90 °F throughout the race. Most walkers were wary of starting too fast, only 20K world record holder Yusuke Suzuki went out fast, opening up a gap just a few minutes into the race. By 5K he had a 10 second lead over a chase pack of only four others, including the world record holder and defending champion Yohann Diniz and Olympic champion Matej Tóth, the rest of the field was 37 seconds or more back. As they were approaching 10K, Diniz decided the man who had taken his 20K world record was too serious a challenger to his title and bridged the ever growing gap. That extra effort didn't last too long before Diniz was sliding back through the field. Diniz eventually dropped out. By 15K, Suzuki had 45 seconds over Tóth and Isaac Palma, the rest of the peloton almost 1:20 back. At 20K, he had over 2 minutes as Tóth and Palma dropped back. Neither would finish. At the half way point, Suzuki had over 3 minutes against new leaders of the chase pack.

Luo Yadong and Niu Wenbin teamed up to try to bridge the gap, Luo getting barely under 3 minutes back by 30K, but by 35K Suzuki had opened up 3:34. As Luo dropped back through the field, the next racer behind Niu was Vieira, still over 4:30 back with 10K to go. Suzuki first showed signs of cracking, stopping at the water station at 44K before getting back on stride. At that point he still had two minutes on Niu, an additional minute on Vieira with the next chaser Evan Dunfee another minute back, now ahead of Luo. Niu had his second red card and was on the edge of disqualification. He couldn't push. One 2K lap later, Suzuki stopped again at the water station and again one lap later. Still with a huge lead, Suzuki struggled through the final lap while Vieira and Dunfee were applying the pressure. Both passed Niu, with Dunfee closing down his gap to Vieira. Suzuki got across the finish line first, only 39 seconds ahead of Vieira, who held off Dunfee by only 3 seconds.

At age 43, Vieira became the oldest medalist. Suzuki's winning time of 4:04:20 was the slowest winning time in the event's history dating back to 1976 by almost 10 minutes. Of 46 starters, 14 dropped out and an additional four were disqualified. 35 minutes after the last competitor crossed the line, it was sunrise in Doha.

== Records ==
Before the competition records were as follows:

Record	Perf.	Athlete	Nat.	Date	Location
World	3:32:33	Yohann Diniz	FRA	15 Aug 2014	Zürich, Switzerland
Championship	3:33:12	Yohann Diniz	FRA	13 Aug 2017	London, Great Britain
World leading	3:37:43	Yohann Diniz	FRA	19 May 2019	Alytus, Lithuania
African	3:54:12	Marc Mundell	RSA	13 Dec 2015	Melbourne, Australia
Asian	3:36:06	Yu Chaohong	CHN	22 Oct 2005	Nanjing, China
NACAC	3:41:09	Érick Barrondo	GUA	23 Mar 2013	Dudince, Slovakia
South American	3:42:57	Andrés Chocho	ECU	6 Mar 2016	Ciudad Juárez, Mexico
European	3:32:33	Yohann Diniz	FRA	15 Aug 2014	Zürich, Switzerland
Oceanian	3:35:47	Nathan Deakes	AUS	2 Dec 2006	Geelong, Australia

== Schedule ==
The event schedule, in local time (UTC+3), was as follows:

Date	Time	Round
28 September	23:30	Final

== Results ==
The final was started at 23:30.

Rank	Name	Nationality	Time	Notes
1st place, gold medalist(s)	Yusuke Suzuki	Japan	4:04:20	
2nd place, silver medalist(s)	João Vieira	Portugal	4:04:59	
3rd place, bronze medalist(s)	Evan Dunfee	Canada	4:05:02	
4	Niu Wenbin	China	4:05:36	
5	Luo Yadong	China	4:06:49	
6	Brendan Boyce	Ireland	4:07:46	
7	Carl Dohmann	Germany	4:10:22	
8	Jesús Ángel García	Spain	4:11:28	
9	Maryan Zakalnytskyy	Ukraine	4:12:28	SB
10	Narcis Mihăilă	Romania	4:13:56	
11	Quentin Rew	New Zealand	4:15:54	
12	Ato Ibáñez	Sweden	4:17:04	
13	Rafał Augustyn	Poland	4:20:25	
14	Mathieu Bilodeau	Canada	4:21:13	
15	Arturas Mastianica	Lithuania	4:21:54	
16	Michele Antonelli	Italy	4:22:20	
17	Alexandros Papamichail	Greece	4:22:39	
18	Horacio Nava	Mexico	4:24:16	
19	Marc Tur	Spain	4:24:38	
20	Jarkko Kinnunen	Finland	4:25:36	
21	Arnis Rumbenieks	Latvia	4:28:18	
22	Artur Brzozowski	Poland	4:30:17	
23	Jonathan Hilbert	Germany	4:30:43	
24	Marc Mundell	South Africa	4:41:39	
25	Valeriy Litanyuk	Ukraine	4:42:18	
26	Bence Venyercsán	Hungary	4:45:04	
27	Hayato Katsuki	Japan	4:46:10	
28	Rafał Sikora	Poland	4:50:08	SB
	Ivan Banzeruk	Ukraine	DNF	
	Teodorico Caporaso	Italy	DNF	
	Andrés Chocho	Ecuador	DNF	
	José Ignacio Díaz	Spain	DNF	
	Yohann Diniz	France	DNF	
	Dzmitry Dziubin	Belarus	DNF	
	Máté Helebrandt	Hungary	DNF	
	Tomohiro Noda	Japan	DNF	
	Isaac Palma	Mexico	DNF	
	Aku Partanen	Finland	DNF	
	Nathaniel Seiler	Germany	DNF	
	Matej Tóth	Slovakia	DNF	
	Claudio Villanueva	Ecuador	DNF	
	Wang Qin	China	DNF	
	Cameron Corbishley	Great Britain & N.I.	DQ	
	Håvard Haukenes	Norway	DQ	
	Dominic King	Great Britain & N.I.	DQ	
	Ruslans Smolonskis	Latvia	DQ	
