= 2016 IAAF World U20 Championships – Men's 10,000 metres walk =

The men's 10,000 metres race walk event at the 2016 IAAF World U20 Championships was held at Zdzisław Krzyszkowiak Stadium on 23 July.

== Medalists ==
Gold	Callum Wilkinson; Great Britain
Silver	Jhonatan Amores; Ecuador
Bronze	Salih Korkmaz; Turkey

== Records ==
Standing records prior to the 2016 IAAF World U20 Championships in Athletics
World Junior Record	Viktor Burayev (RUS)	38:46.4	Moscow, Russia	20 May 2000
Championship Record	Daisuke Matsunaga (JPN)	39:27.19	Eugene, United States	25 July 2014
World Junior Leading	Federico González (MEX)	41:08.87	Monterrey, Mexico	14 May 2016

== Results ==
Rank	Name	Nationality	Time	Note	Penalties
1st place, gold medalist(s)	Callum Wilkinson	Great Britain	40:41.62	WU20L	~~
2nd place, silver medalist(s)	Jhonatan Amores	Ecuador	40:43.33	PB	~
3rd place, bronze medalist(s)	Salih Korkmaz	Turkey	40:45.53	NU20R	~
4	Yohanis Algaw	Ethiopia	40:55.96	AU20R	~
5	Zhu Guowen	China	41:01.33		~
6	Bai Liga	China	41:06.14		
7	Noel Chama	Mexico	41:29.28		~
8	Leo Köpp	Germany	41:33.10		
9	Masatora Kawano	Japan	41:42.48		
10	Manuel Bermúdez	Spain	41:52.09		
11	Gabriel Bordier	France	41:53.16		
12	Tyler Jones	Australia	42:02.96	PB	~>
13	César Rodríguez	Peru	42:06.18		~~
14	Cristian Merchán	Colombia	42:10.20		
15	Giacomo Brandi	Italy	42:19.49		
16	Adam Garganis	Australia	42:22.96	PB	
17	Pablo Rodríguez	Bolivia	42:24.39	PB	
18	César Herrera	Colombia	42:28.99	PB	
19	Song Yun-hwa	South Korea	42:31.88		
20	Arturs Makars	Latvia	42:33.35		
21	Baha Eddine Gatri	Tunisia	42:44.28		
22	Joo Hyun-myeong	South Korea	42:44.48		
23	Eduard Zabuzhenko	Ukraine	43:00.63		
24	Cameron Corbishley	Great Britain	43:06.91		
25	Ryutaro Yamamoto	Japan	43:14.19		
26	Oleksandr Zholob	Ukraine	43:33.42		
27	Dominik Černý	Slovakia	43:39.92		
28	Soma Kovács	Hungary	43:41.91		>
29	Sergio Daniel Sacul	Guatemala	43:46.44	PB	
30	Mustafa Özbek	Turkey	43:48.37		
31	Daniel Chamosa	Spain	43:56.20		
32	Aníbal Xiquín	Guatemala	43:57.88	PB	
33	Kacper Kosecki	Poland	43:58.23		>~
34	Lenyn Mamani	Peru	44:01.61		~
35	Vít Hlavác	Czech Republic	44:17.93		
36	Niccolò Coppini	Italy	44:19.72		
37	Yhojan Melillán	Chile	44:35.63		
38	Billal Djafri	Algeria	46:40.93	PB	
	Arkadiusz Drozdowicz	Poland	DNF		~
	David Hurtado	Ecuador	DQ		~~~~
