= 2019 European Athletics U23 Championships – Men's 20 kilometres walk =

The men's 20 kilometres walk event at the 2019 European Athletics U23 Championships was held in Gävle, Sweden on 14 July.

== Results ==
Rank	Name	Nationality	Time	Notes	Penalties
1st place, gold medalist(s)	Vasiliy Mizinov	Authorised Neutral Athletes	1:21:29	EU23L	~~
2nd place, silver medalist(s)	Salih Korkmaz	Turkey	1:21:32	NR	
3rd place, bronze medalist(s)	Callum Wilkinson	Great Britain	1:22:13		~~
4	Eduard Zabuzhenko	Ukraine	1:23:54		~
5	Manuel Bermúdez	Spain	1:24:17	SB	
6	Abdulselam İmük	Turkey	1:24:34	PB	~>
7	Dzmitry Lukyanchuk	Belarus	1:24:41	PB	
8	Iván López	Spain	1:24:59		
9	David Kenny	Ireland	1:25:43	PB	
10	Viktor Shumik	Ukraine	1:26:18		
11	Vít Hlaváč	Czech Republic	1:26:55	PB	>>
12	Cameron Corbishley	Great Britain	1:27:07		~~~
13	Oleh Svystun	Ukraine	1:27:49		
14	Giacomo Brandi	Italy	1:28:36		>
15	Niccolò Coppini	Italy	1:29:18		>>
16	David Kuster	France	1:30:06		>>
17	José Manuel Pérez	Spain	1:30:45		
18	Ettore Grillo	Italy	1:37:44		>
19	Dominik Černý	Slovakia	1:38:14		>>
	Gabriel Bordier	France	DNF		>
	Yeoryios Tzatzimakis	Greece	DQ		~~~~

Penalties:
~ Lost contact
> Bent knee
