= 2017 European Athletics U23 Championships – Men's 20 kilometres walk =

The men's 20 kilometres walk event at the 2017 European Athletics U23 Championships was held in Bydgoszcz, Poland, at Zdzisław Krzyszkowiak Stadium on 16 July.

== Results ==
Rank	Name	Nationality	Time	Notes
1st place, gold medalist(s)	Diego García	Spain	1:22:29	
2nd place, silver medalist(s)	Karl Junghannß	Germany	1:22:52	
3rd place, bronze medalist(s)	Gabriel Bordier	France	1:23:03	PB
4	Salih Korkmaz	Turkey	1:23:11	NU23R
5	Manuel Bermúdez	Spain	1:23:12	PB
6	Jonathan Hilbert	Germany	1:23:26	PB
7	Andrea Agrusti	Italy	1:23:28	PB
8	Jean Blancheteau	France	1:25:10	
9	Zaharias Tsamoudakis	Greece	1:25:11	PB
10	Stefano Chiesa	Italy	1:25:21	PB
11	Miguel Rodrigues	Portugal	1:26:05	PB
12	Bence Venyercsán	Hungary	1:26:20	
13	Gianluca Picchiottino	Italy	1:26:43	
14	Helder Santos	Portugal	1:27:00	PB
15	Anatoli Homeleu	Belarus	1:27:08	SB
16	Ruslans Smolonskis	Latvia	1:27:25	PB
17	Fredrik Væng Røtnes	Norway	1:27:44	SB
18	Dominik Černý	Slovakia	1:28:00	
19	Iván López	Spain	1:28:02	
20	Dmytro Sobchuk	Ukraine	1:28:07	
21	Miroslav Úradník	Slovakia	1:29:44	
22	Michal Morvay	Slovakia	1:30:05	
23	Andrei Gafita	Romania	1:32:41	
24	Soma Kovács	Hungary	1:33:50	
	Fabian Bernabe	France	DNF	
	Tomasz Bagdány	Hungary	DQ	
	Dzmitry Lukyanchuk	Belarus	DQ	
	Nathaniel Seiler	Germany	DQ	
