= 2018 European Athletics Championships – Men's 50 kilometres walk =

Men's 50 kilometres walk at the 2018 European Athletics Championships
- Venue: Olympic Stadium
- Location: Berlin
- Dates: 7 August 2018
- Competitors: 36 from 18 nations
- Winning time: 3:46:32

Medalists
gold medal	Maryan Zakalnytskyy	Ukraine
silver medal	Matej Tóth	Slovakia
bronze medal	Dzmitry Dziubin	Belarus

The men's 50 kilometres race walk at the 2018 European Athletics Championships took place at the Olympic Stadium on 7 August.

== Records ==
Standing records prior to the 2018 European Athletics Championships
World record	Yohann Diniz (FRA)	3:32:33	Zürich, Switzerland	15 August 2014
European record	Yohann Diniz (FRA)	3:32:33	Zürich, Switzerland	15 August 2014
Championship record	Yohann Diniz (FRA)	3:32:33	Zürich, Switzerland	15 August 2014
World Leading	Sergey Bakulin (RUS)	3:42:20	Cheboksary, Russia	9 June 2018
European Leading	Sergey Bakulin (RUS)	3:42:20	Cheboksary, Russia	9 June 2018

== Schedule ==
Date	Time	Round
7 August 2018	8:35	Final

All times are local times (UTC+2)

== Results ==
=== Final ===
Rank	Name	Nationality	Time	Note
1st place, gold medalist(s)	Maryan Zakalnytskyy	Ukraine	3:46:32	
2nd place, silver medalist(s)	Matej Tóth	Slovakia	3:47:27	
3rd place, bronze medalist(s)	Dzmitry Dziubin	Belarus	3:47:59	PB
4	Håvard Haukenes	Norway	3:48:35	
5	Carl Dohmann	Germany	3:50:27	SB
6	Rafał Augustyn	Poland	3:51:37	
7	Rafał Sikora	Poland	3:52:56	
8	Nathaniel Seiler	Germany	3:54:08	PB
9	José Ignacio Díaz	Spain	3:55:28	SB
10	Marco De Luca	Italy	3:55:47	
11	Andrea Agrusti	Italy	3:57:03	
12	Adrian Błocki	Poland	3:57:11	
13	Bence Venyercsán	Hungary	3:58:25	NRU23
14	Arturas Mastianica	Lithuania	3:58:29	PB
15	Dušan Majdán	Slovakia	3:59:21	SB
16	Ivan Banzeruk	Ukraine	4:00:57	
17	Tadas Šuškevičius	Lithuania	4:01:30	
18	Valeriy Litanyuk	Ukraine	4:01:33	
19	Brendan Boyce	Ireland	4:02:14	
20	Anatole Ibáñez	Sweden	4:03:53	SB
21	Lukáš Gdula	Czech Republic	4:05:44	
22	Marc Tur	Spain	4:09:18	
23	Anders Hansson	Sweden	4:11:36	SB
24	Pedro Isidro	Portugal	4:11:44	
25	Bruno Erent	Croatia	4:24:20	
26	Jarkko Kinnunen	Finland	4:24:59	
	Aku Partanen	Finland	DNF	
	Florin Alin Știrbu	Romania	DNF	
	Michele Antonelli	Italy	DNF	
	Jesús Ángel García Bragado	Spain	DNF	
	Arnis Rumbenieks	Latvia	DNF	
	Narcis Ștefan Mihăilă	Romania	DNF	
	Máté Helebrandt	Hungary	DNF	
	Aleksi Ojala	Finland	DNF	
	João Vieira	Portugal	DNF	
	Karl Junghannß	Germany	DQ	230.7 (a)
