= 2014 World Junior Championships in Athletics – Men's 10,000 metres walk =

The men's 10,000 metres race walk at the 2014 World Junior Championships in Athletics was held at Hayward Field on 25 July.

== Medalists ==
Gold	Daisuke Matsunaga; Japan
Silver	Diego García; Spain
Bronze	Paolo Yurivilca; Peru

== Records ==
Standing records prior to the 2014 World Junior Championships in Athletics
World Junior Record	Viktor Burayev (RUS)	38:46.4	Moscow, Russia	20 May 2000
Championship Record	Stanislav Emelyanov (RUS)	39:35.01	Bydgoszcz, Poland	11 July 2008
World Junior Leading	Daisuke Matsunaga (JPN)	39:18.71	Kumagaya, Japan	17 May 2014
Broken records during the 2014 World Junior Championships in Athletics
Championship Record	Daisuke Matsunaga (JPN)	39:27.19	Eugene, United States	25 July 2014

== Results ==
=== Final ===
25 July
Start time: 09:58 Temperature: 18 °C Humidity: 64 %

Rank	Name	Nationality	Time	Notes	Red cards ~ Lost contact > Bent knee
1st place, gold medalist(s)	Daisuke Matsunaga	Japan	39:27.19	CR	~
2nd place, silver medalist(s)	Diego García	Spain	39:51.59	NJR	
3rd place, bronze medalist(s)	Paolo Yurivilca	Peru	40:02.07	NJR	~~
4	Yuga Yamashita	Japan	40:15.27	PB	>
5	Nikolay Markov	Russia	40:22.48	PB	
6	Zaharías Tsamoudákis	Greece	40:35.89	NJR	~
7	Ricardo Ortiz	Mexico	40:40.31	PB	~
8	Wang Rui	China	40:48.62	SB	
9	José Luis Doctor	Mexico	40:49.71	PB	~
10	César Rodríguez	Peru	41:57.90	PB	~
11	Jürgen Grave	Guatemala	42:00.06	PB	~~
12	Muratcan Karapınar	Turkey	42:01.42	NJR	~
13	Brayan Fuentes	Colombia	42:18.59	PB	>~
14	Jean Blancheteau	France	42:33.44	PB	~~
15	Pablo Oliva	Spain	42:41.08	PB	
16	Miroslav Úradník	Slovakia	42:49.92	PB	
17	Nathan Brill	Australia	42:54.39	SB	~
18	Jonathan Hilbert	Germany	43:02.55	SB	~
19	José Israel Meléndez	Puerto Rico	43:05.12	NJR	
20	Nathaniel Seiler	Germany	43:12.78	SB	
21	Bence Venyercsán	Hungary	43:25.62	PB	
22	Marek Adamowicz	Canada	43:25.84	PB	~
23	Gregorio Angelini	Italy	43:34.10	PB	
24	Daniele Todisco	Italy	43:47.06	PB	>
25	Tomasz Bagdány	Hungary	43:53.13	PB	
26	Choe Byeongho	South Korea	44:57.84	SB	~
27	Xu Gang	China	45:10.35	SB	
28	Anthony Peters	United States	45:31.86	PB	
29	Martynas Jarusevičius	Lithuania	45:46.96	SB	>
30	Michal Morvay	Slovakia	46:34.31	PB	>
31	Al Shaali Hassan Jasim Alnuaimi	United Arab Emirates	48:03.91	SB	~
32	Hamad Ali Alhindaassi	United Arab Emirates	48:07.22	SB	>
33	Jesse Osborne	Australia	49:53.38		
	Maxim Krasnov	Russia	DQ	230.6(a)	>~~
	Braulio Morocho	Ecuador	DQ	230.6(a)	>>>
	Brian Pintado	Ecuador	DQ	230.6(a)	~~~
	Ioánnis Vaítsis	Greece	DQ	230.6(a)	>>>

Note:
IAAF Rule 230.6(a) - Repeated failure to comply with the definition of Race Walking

Intermediate times:
1000m: 3:54.07 Daisuke Matsunaga
2000m: 7:50.90 Daisuke Matsunaga
3000m: 11:47.69 Daisuke Matsunaga
4000m: 15:43.46 Daisuke Matsunaga
5000m: 19:37.77 Daisuke Matsunaga
6000m: 23:35.78 Daisuke Matsunaga
7000m: 27:36.16 Daisuke Matsunaga
8000m: 31:35.35 Daisuke Matsunaga
9000m: 35:37.26 Daisuke Matsunaga

== Participation ==
According to an unofficial count, 37 athletes from 23 countries participated in the event.

- Australia (2)
- Canada (1)
- China (2)
- Colombia (1)
- Ecuador (2)
- France (1)
- Germany (2)
- Greece (2)
- Guatemala (1)
- Hungary (2)
- Italy (2)
- Japan (2)
- Lithuania (1)
- Mexico (2)
- Peru (2)
- Puerto Rico (1)
- Russia (2)
- Slovakia (2)
- South Korea (1)
- Spain (2)
- Turkey (1)
- United Arab Emirates (2)
- United States (1)
