= Cam Corbishley =

British race walker (born 1997)

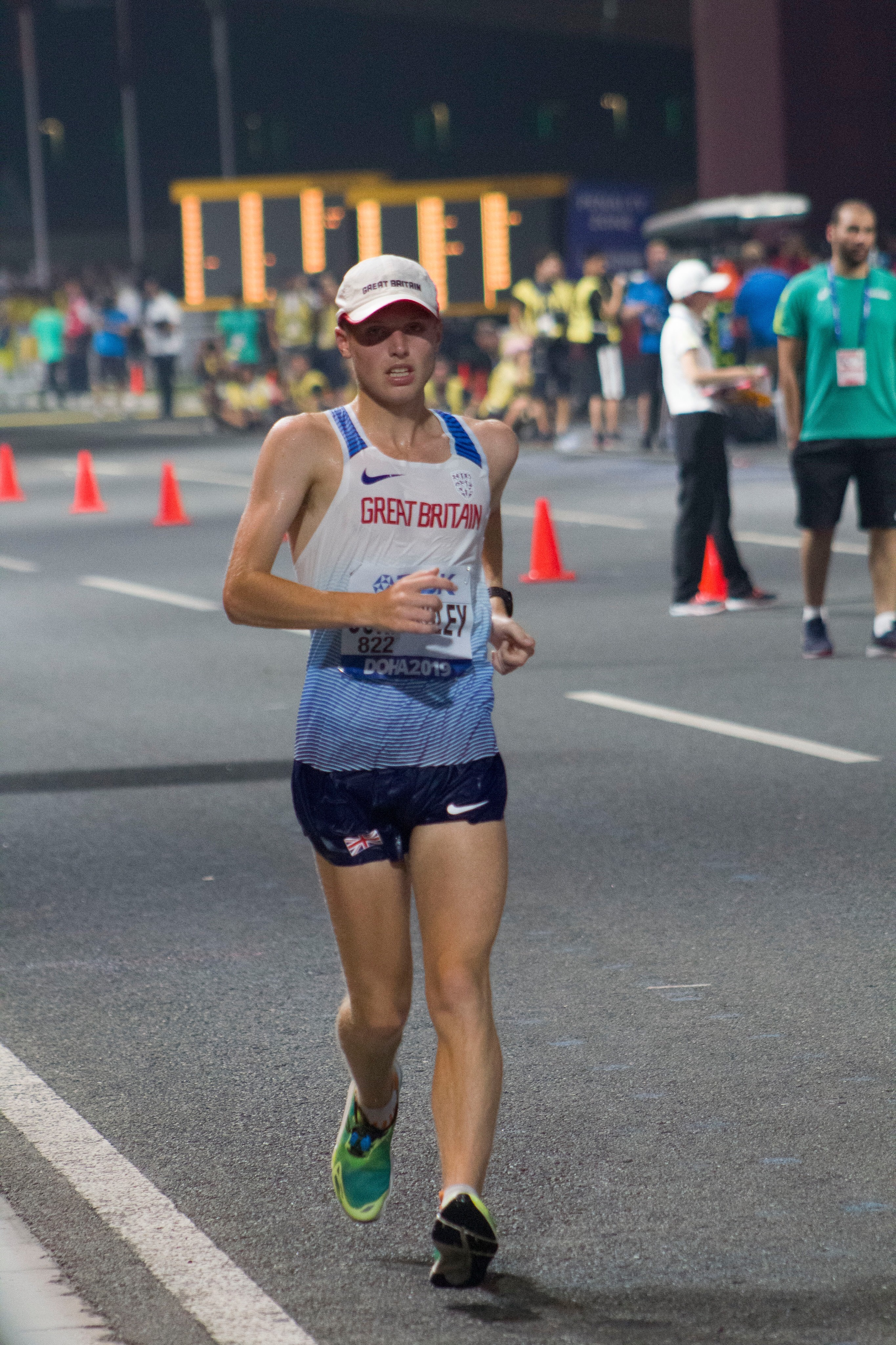
- Corbishley competing in the 2019 World Athletics Championships in Doha.

Personal information
- Nationality: British (English)
- Born: 31 March 1997 (age 29) Maidstone, England
- Education: Leeds Trinity University

Sport
- Sport: Athletics
- Event: Racewalking
- Club: Medway and Maidstone
- Coached by: Andi Drake

Achievements and titles
- Personal bests: 11:19.10 for 3000m; 19:49.53 for 5000m; 40:59 for 10km; 1:24:42 for 20km; 3:53:20 for 50km
Medal record
UK Athletics Championships
Gold medal – first place	2025 Birmingham	5000m walk

Cameron Corbishley (born 31 March 1997) is a British race walker. He specialises in the 20 km and 50 km walks.

== Biography ==
In 2016, he competed in the men's 10,000 metres walk at the 2016 IAAF World U20 Championships held in Bydgoszcz, Poland, where he finished in 24th place. the following year he competed in the 20 km walk at the European Race Walking Cup in Poděbrady, Czech Republic. Finishing 36th, with a time of 1:27:26, this resulted in the British Athletics team finishing fourth in the team competition, their highest ever placing.

Representing England in January 2018, he took fifth place in the men's 5000m walk at the Bratislava Elan meeting with a time of 20:16.44, and in March, he competed in the Lugano Trophy 15th Memorial Mario Albisetti 20 km held in Lugano, but was disqualified before the end of the race. In April at the European Athletics Race Walking permit meeting in Poděbrady, he finished 33rd with a time of 1:32:47 and in August, claimed the gold medal for the 3000m walk at the Manchester International Match, setting a season Best time of 11:48.07.

In January 2019, Corbishley took the England Indoor title over 3000 metres in Sheffield and achieved a new personal best of 19:49.53 over 5000 metres in the Bratislava Elan meeting. In March, Corbishley debuted in the 50 kilometres walk in Dudince, Slovakia, setting a new British U23 record of 3:53:20, the second fastest time ever by a Briton. In May, he set a new pb over 20 km of 1:25:45 in the European Race Walking Cup in Alytus, Lithuania. His performance, alongside Tom Bosworth and Callum Wilkinson, earned the British team a silver medal. In July, he competed in the men's 20 kilometres walk at the 2019 European Athletics U23 Championships held in Gävle, Sweden. He finished in 12th place. and in August, returned to Manchester to defend his title for the 3000m walk in the international meet, taking first place again in a time of 11:44.98, a new Championship Best Performance for the Manchester International Match.

He competed in the men's 50 kilometres walk at the 2019 World Athletics Championships held in Doha, Qatar but was disqualified after a fourth red card.

Corbishley podiumed three times at the British Athletics Championships in 2019, 2021 and 2023. He won the 5000 metres walk title at the 2025 UK Athletics Championships and competed at the 2025 World Athletics Championships in Tokyo, Japan.

== Achievements ==
Year	Competition	Venue	Position	Event	Notes
Representing Great Britain
2013	European Race Walking Cup (U20)	Dudince, Slovakia	41st	10 km walk	48:20
2015	European Race Walking Cup (U20)	Murcia, Spain	DQ – Disqualified	10 km walk	DQ
2016	World Race Walking Cup	Rome, Italy	26th	10 km walk	43:27
2016	IAAF World U20 Championships	Bydgoszcz, Poland	24th	10,000m walk	43:06.91
2017	European Race Walking Cup	Poděbrady, Czech Republic	36th	20 km walk	1:27:26
2019	European Race Walking Cup	Alytus, Lithuania	25th	20 km walk	1:25:45
2019	European Athletics U23 Championships	Gävle, Sweden	12th	20 km walk	1:27:07
2019	IAAF World Championships	Doha, Qatar	DQ – Disqualified	50 km walk	DQ

== Statistics ==
=== Personal bests ===
Event	Time	Venue	Date	Notes
3000 metres race walk	11:19.10	Leeds, United Kingdom	12 June 2017	
5000 metres race walk	19:49.53i	Bratislava, Slovakia	27 January 2019	Indoor
10 kilometres race walk	40:59.00	Coventry, United Kingdom	1 March 2020	
20 kilometres race walk	1:24:42.00	Leeds, United Kingdom	30 June 2019	
50 kilometres race walk	3:53:20.00	Dudince, Slovakia	23 March 2019	

== Personal life ==
From Sittingbourne, Kent, he started in athletics at Maidstone and Medway Athletics Club. Corbishley studied a BA (Hons) in Philosophy, Ethics and Religion at Leeds Trinity University, graduating in 2018. He later worked in an administrative role for the Yorkshire Ambulance Service in Leeds.
