= Niu Wenbin =

Chinese racewalker

Personal information
- Nationality: Chinese
- Born: 20 January 1991 (age 34)

Sport
- Sport: Athletics
- Event: Race walking

Niu Wenbin (born 20 January 1991) is a Chinese racewalking athlete. Representing China at the 2019 World Athletics Championships, he placed fourth in the men's 50 kilometres walk.
