= Matej Tóth =

Slovak racewalker (born 1983)

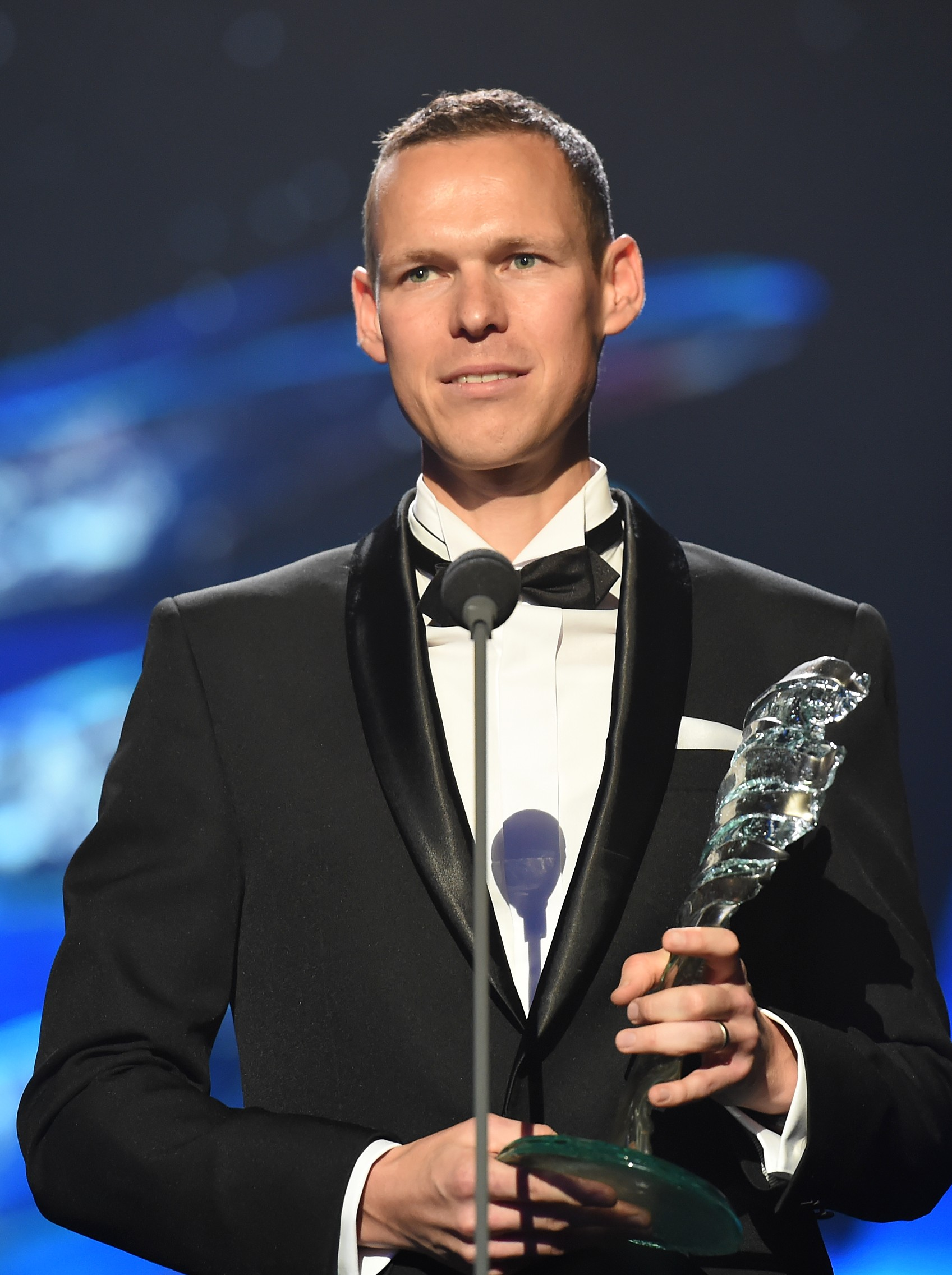
- Tóth in 2016

Personal information
- Born: 10 February 1983 (age 43) Nitra, Czechoslovakia
- Years active: 1995–2021
- Height: 1.85 m (6 ft 1 in)
- Weight: 73 kg (161 lb)

Sport
- Country: Slovakia
- Sport: Athletics
- Event: 50 km Race Walk
Medal record
Olympic Games
Gold medal – first place	2016 Rio de Janeiro	50 km walk
World Championships
Gold medal – first place	2015 Beijing	50 km walk
European Championships
Silver medal – second place	2014 Zürich	50 km walk
Silver medal – second place	2018 Berlin	50 km walk
World Race Walking Cup
Gold medal – first place	2010 Chihuahua	50 km walk

Matej Tóth (Slovak pronunciation: [ˈmacej ˈtɔːt]; born 10 February 1983) is a retired Slovak race walker. He won the 50 km walk World Championship in 2015, and became an Olympic champion in the same event in 2016.

== Career ==
Tóth won the gold medal in the 50 km walk at the 2010 IAAF World Race Walking Cup held in Chihuahua, Mexico, finishing with the slowest winning time since 1993.

He finished first at the 2015 World Championships, taking Slovakia's first ever gold at the championships and completing the course two minutes ahead of his nearest rival.

Tóth finished first at the 2016 Olympic Games in 50 km walk with a time of 3 hours, 40 minutes and 58 seconds, winning the first Slovak Olympic medal in athletics since the country's independence in 1993.

Tóth was the 2016 Slovak Athlete of the Year, winning the award for the fourth consecutive time, and fifth time overall, that year. Tóth closed the year out by winning the Sportsperson of the Year award in December 2016, ahead of cyclist Peter Sagan and tennis player Dominika Cibulková. He added a sixth Athlete of the Year title in 2018.

In 2018, Tóth won a silver medal in the men's 50 kilometres walk at the 2018 European Athletics Championships held in Berlin, Germany. In 2019, he competed in the men's 50 kilometres walk at the 2019 World Athletics Championships held in Doha, Qatar, but did not finish the race.

Toth represented Slovakia at the 2020 Summer Olympics and finished 14th in the men's 50 kilometres walk with a season's best. The race, the sixteenth time he had competed over 50 kilometres, was his final competitive venture before retiring from the sport after a career spanning 26 years.

Awards and achievements
Preceded by Peter Sagan	Sportsperson of Slovakia; 2016	Succeeded by Peter Sagan
