= Gianluca Picchiottino =

Italian racewalker (born 1996)

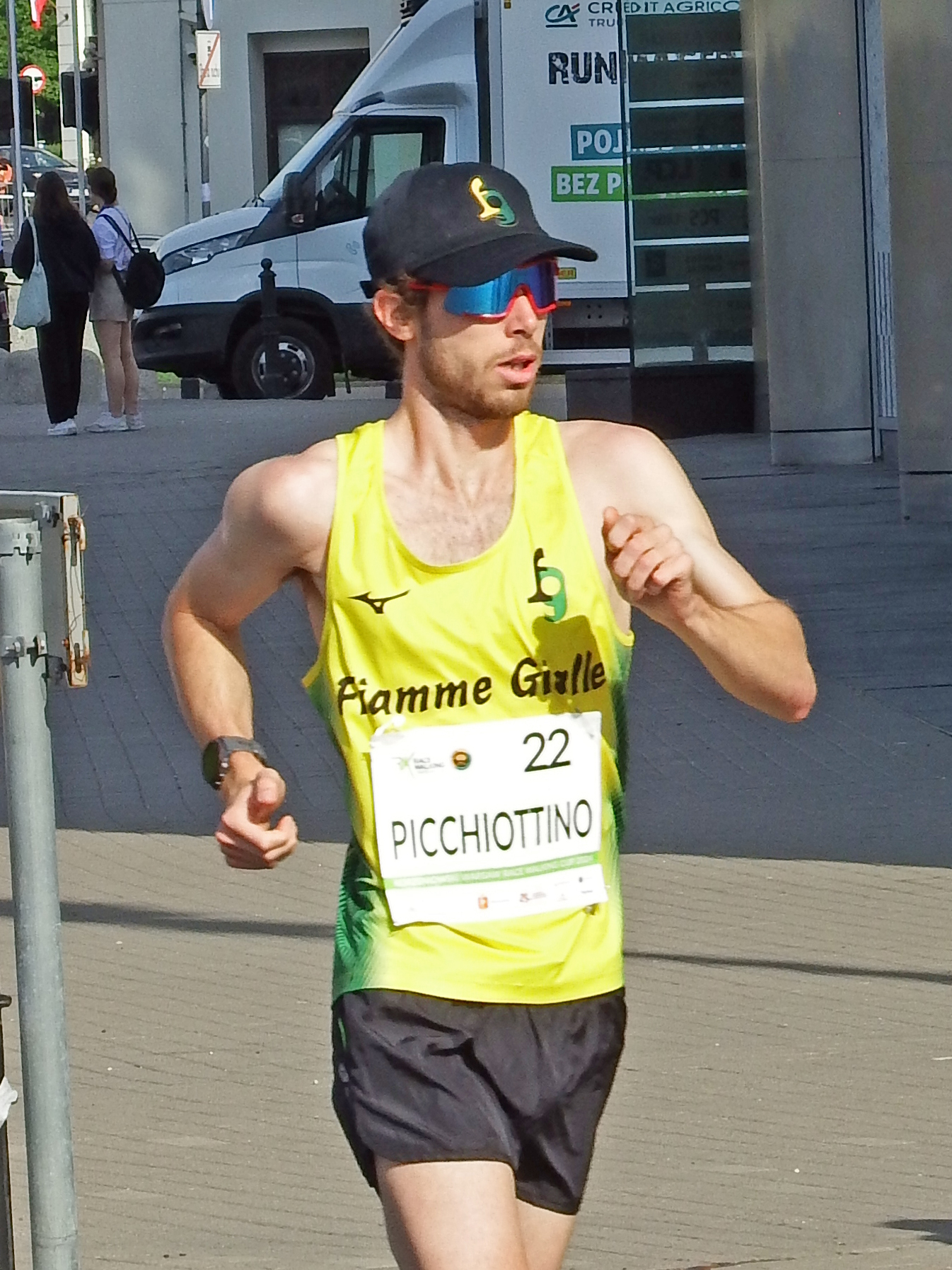
- Picchiottino in 2024

Personal information
- National team: Italy
- Born: 22 August 1996 (age 29) Pisa, Italy
- Height: 1.76 m (5 ft 9 in)
- Weight: 61 kg (134 lb)

Sport
- Sport: Athletics
- Event: Racewalking
- Club: G.S. Fiamme Gialle
- Coached by: Massimo Passoni

Achievements and titles
- Personal bests: 10 km: 39:26 (2018); 20 km: 1:20:46 (2024)

Gianluca Picchiottino (born 22 August 1996) is an Italian racewalker who won two national titles at senior level and participated at the 2022 World Athletics Championships.

== Achievements ==
Year	Competition	Venue	Rank	Event	Time	Notes
2022	World Championships	(United States) Eugene	32nd	20 km walk	1:28:33	
2024	European Championships	(Italy) Rome	DNF	20 km walk	no time	

== National titles ==
He won two national championships at senior level.

- Italian Athletics Championships
  - 10 km walk: 2019
  - 20 km walk: 2022

== See also ==
- Italian team at the running events
- Italy at the World Athletics Race Walking Team Championships
- Italy at the European Race Walking Team Championships
