= Luo Yadong =

Chinese racewalker

Personal information
- Nationality: Chinese
- Born: 15 January 1992 (age 33)

Sport
- Sport: Athletics
- Event: Race walking

Luo Yadong (born 15 January 1992) is a Chinese racewalking athlete. Representing China at the 2019 World Athletics Championships, he placed fifth in the men's 50 kilometres walk.
