= Andrea Agrusti =

Italian racewalker (born 1995)

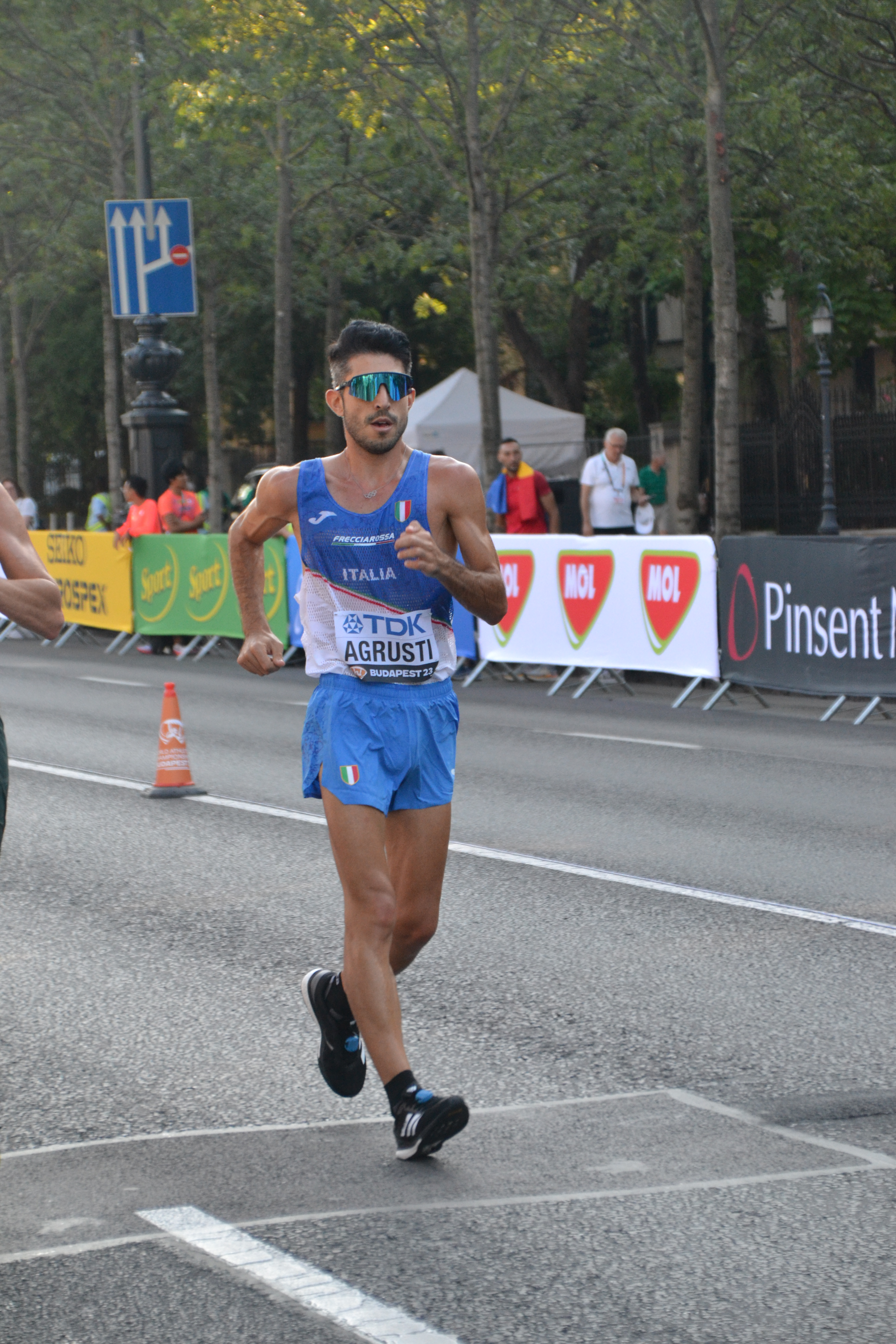

Personal information
- Born: 30 August 1995 (age 30) Sassari, Italy

Sport
- Country: Italy
- Sport: Racewalking
- Club: G.S. Fiamme Gialle
- Coached by: Patrizio Parcesepe

Achievements and titles
- Personal bests: 35 km walk: 2:30:16 (2023); 50 km walk: 3:49:52 (2021)
Medal record
Representing Italy
Men's athletics
World Team Championships
Silver medal – second place	2026 Brasília	Marathon walk (team)
European Race Walking Team Championships
Bronze medal – third place	2021 Poděbrady	50 km walk
Gold medal – first place	2021 Poděbrady	50 km walk (team)

Andrea Agrusti (born 30 August 1995 in Sassari) is an Italian racewalker. He competed at the 2020 Summer Olympics in 50 km walk.

== Biography ==
He became interested with athletics after looking 2004 Olympic Games at television, but he started with sprint and doing also some basket. Then he specialised only in racewalking, with coach Marco Sanna in Sassari. He won his first Junior National title in 2014 and from November 2014 he moved to Castel Porziano with a new coach, Patrizio Parcesepe. He participated to his first 50 km walk in 2015.

With 6 National caps, he finished 11th at 2018 European Championships, 22nd at 2018 World Team Championships, 11th at 2017 European Cup and did not finished this race in 2019, then at his third attempt, he won the bronze medal at 2021 European Team Championships, with his personal best, qualifying him to the 2020 Olympics.
