= Miroslav Úradník =

Slovak racewalker

Personal information
- Nationality: Slovak
- Born: 24 March 1996 (age 30)

Sport
- Sport: Men's athletics
- Event: Racewalking

Miroslav Úradník (born 24 March 1996) is a Slovak racewalking athlete. He represented Slovakia at the 2020 Summer Olympics in the men's 20 kilometres walk.

== Career ==
Úradník represented Slovakia at the 2020 Summer Olympics in the men's 20 kilometres walk and finished in 41st place.

== Competition record ==
Year	Competition	Venue	Position	Event	Notes
Representing Slovakia
2013	European Race Walking Cup	Dudince, Slovakia	31st	10 km walk	47:21
2014	World Race Walking Cup	Taicang, China	16th	10 km walk	43:05
2014	World Junior Championships	Eugene, United States	16th	10 km walk	42:49.92
2015	European Race Walking Cup	Murcia, Spain	4th	10 km walk	41:38
2016	World Race Walking Cup	Taicang, China	93rd	20 km walk	1:32:23
2017	European Race Walking Cup	Poděbrady, Czech Republic	41st	20 km walk	1:28:43
2017	European U23 Championships	Bydgoszcz, Poland	21st	20 km walk	1:29:44
2017	Universiade	Taipei, Taiwan	—	20 km walk	DNF
2018	European Championships	Berlin, Germany	22nd	20 km walk	1:25:44
2019	European Race Walking Cup	Alytus, Lithuania	30th	20 km walk	1:26:37
2019	Universiade	Naples, Italy	10th	20 km walk	1:27:42
2019	Military World Games	Wuhan, China	3rd	20 km walk	1:24:16
2021	World Race Walking Cup	Poděbrady, Czech Republic	31st	20 km walk	1:26:39
2021	Olympic Games	Tokyo, Japan	41st	20 km walk	1:29:25
