= Anders Hansson (race walker) =

Swedish racewalker (1992–2020)

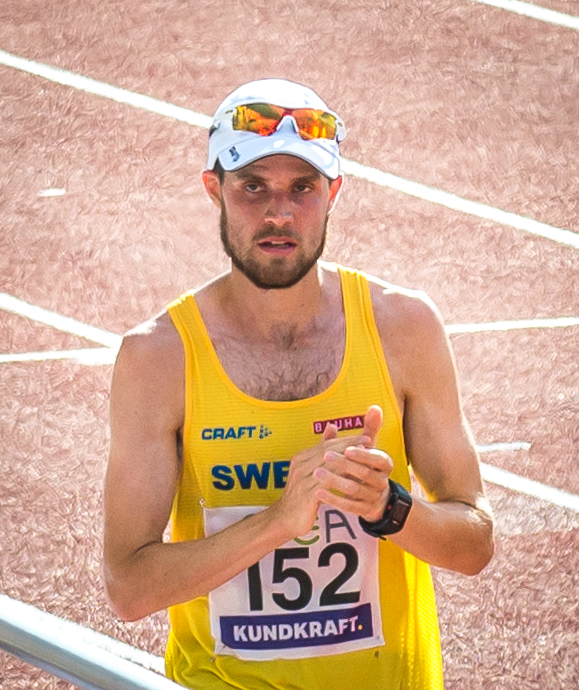
- Anders Hansson during the Finland-Sweden Athletics International in Stockholms 2019.

Personal information
- Born: 10 March 1992
- Died: 30 October 2020 (aged 28)

Sport
- Country: Sweden
- Sport: Track and field
- Event: racewalking
- Updated on 29 August 2015

Anders Hansson (10 March 1992 – 30 October 2020) was a male Swedish racewalker.

== Career ==
He competed in the 50 kilometres walk event at the 2015 World Championships in Athletics in Beijing, China, but did not finish. In 2018, he competed in the men's 50 kilometres walk at the 2018 European Athletics Championships held in Berlin, Germany. He finished in 23rd place.

Hansson died of cancer on 30 October 2020.

== See also ==
- Sweden at the 2015 World Championships in Athletics
