= Isaac Palma =

Mexican racewalker

Personal information
- Born: October 26, 1990 (age 35)
- Education: Anahuac University of North Mexico
- Height: 1.74 m (5 ft 9 in)
- Weight: 69 kg (152 lb)

Sport
- Country: Mexico
- Sport: Athletics
- Event: 20km Race Walk

Isaac Antonio Palma Olivares (born October 26, 1990, in Zitácuaro, Michoacán) is a Mexican racewalker. He has represented Mexico in multiple international competitions. He began to practice racewalking in 2005 in his hometown. In 2008, he joined the Alfredo Harp Helu Foundation as a sports prospectus and then entered the CNAR this year. In 2008 he competed for the first time internationally in the World Cup in Chevoksary Russia. He competed for Mexico in 20 kilometres walk at the 2012 Summer Olympics in London. In 2019, he won the 50 km race at the Pan American Race Walking Cup. In 2019, he competed in the men's 50 kilometres walk at the 2019 World Athletics Championships held in Doha, Qatar. He did not finish his race.

His younger brother, Ever, is also a racewalker.
