= Jonathan Hilbert =

German racewalker (born 1995)

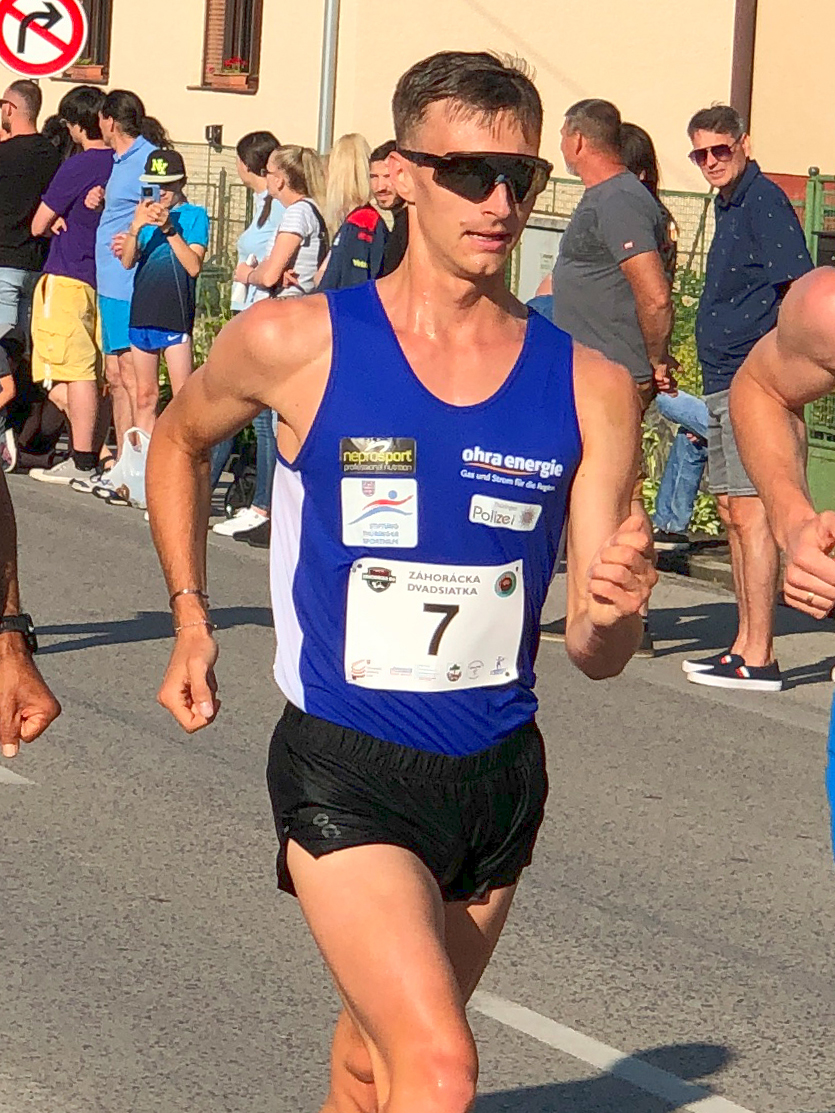
- Hilbert in 2023

Personal information
- Born: 21 April 1995 (age 31) Mühlhausen, Germany

Sport
- Country: Germany
- Sport: Racewalking
Medal record
Men's Racewalking
Representing Germany
Olympic Games
Silver medal – second place	2020 Tokyo	50 km walk

Jonathan Hilbert (born 21 April 1995) is a German racewalker. He won the silver medal in the men's 50 kilometres walk at the 2020 Summer Olympics held in Tokyo, Japan. In 2019, he competed in the men's 50 kilometres walk at the World Athletics Championships held in Doha, Qatar. He finished in 23rd place.

In 2014, he competed in the men's 10,000 metres walk at the World Junior Championships in Athletics held in Eugene, Oregon, United States. In 2017, he finished in 6th place in the men's 20 kilometres walk at the European Athletics U23 Championships held in Bydgoszcz, Poland.

== International competitions ==
Year	Competition	Venue	Position	Event	Notes
Representing Germany
2019	World Championships	Doha, Qatar	23rd	50 km walk	4:30:43
2021	2020 Summer Olympics	Sapporo, Japan	2nd	50 km walk	3:50:44
