= Daisuke Matsunaga =

Japanese racewalker (born 1995)

Personal information
- Born: 24 March 1995 (age 31) Kanagawa Prefecture, Japan
- Height: 1.74 m (5 ft 8 1/2 in)
- Weight: 60 kg (132 lb)

Sport
- Country: Japan
- Sport: Men's athletics
- Event: 20 kilometres race walk

Achievements and titles
- Personal best: 20 km walk: 1:18:53 (2016)

Daisuke Matsunaga (松永 大介, Matsunaga Daisuke; born 24 March 1995) is a Japanese male racewalking athlete who competes in the 20 kilometres race walk. He holds a personal best of 1:18:53 hours. He represented his nation at the 2016 Summer Olympics and was the 2014 World Junior champion.

He made his first impact at the 2012 Asian Junior Athletics Championships, taking a silver, then won the 2014 World Junior Championships in Athletics in a championship record of 39:27.19 minutes. He also took a silver in the junior race behind Gao Wenkui at the 2014 IAAF World Race Walking Cup in China. Moving into the senior ranks he took bronze medals at the 2015 Asian Race Walking Championships and the 2015 Summer Universiade

He started 2016 with a win at the Asian Race Walking Championships. He was selected to represent Japan at the 2016 Summer Olympics and placed seventh in the final.

== Personal bests ==
- 10,000 metres race walk – 39:18.04 min (2015)
- 10 kilometres race walk – 39:45 min (2014)
- 20 kilometres race walk – 1:18:53 hrs (2016)

All information from All-Athletics.

== International competitions ==
Year	Competition	Venue	Position	Event	Notes
2012	Asian Junior Championships	Colombo, Sri Lanka	2nd	10,000 m walk	45:03.01
2014	World Race Walking Cup	Taicang, China	2nd	10 km walk (junior)	39:45
2014	World Race Walking Cup	Taicang, China	5th	Junior team	23 pts
2014	World Junior Championships	Eugene, United States	1st	10,000 m walk	39:27.19 CR
2015	Asian Race Walking Championships	Nomi, Japan	3rd	20 km walk	1:19:08
2015	Universiade	Gwangju, South Korea	3rd	20 km walk	1:22:06
2016	Asian Race Walking Championships	Nomi, Japan	1st	20 km walk	1:19:01
2016	Olympic Games	Rio de Janeiro, Brazil	7th	20 km walk	1:20:22
