= Michele Antonelli =

Italian racewalker (born 1994)

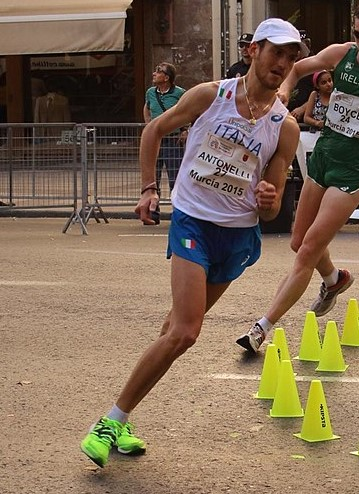
- Antonelli in 2015

Personal information
- Nationality: Italian
- Born: 23 May 1994 (age 32) Macerata, Italy
- Height: 1.80 m (5 ft 11 in)
- Weight: 66 kg (146 lb)

Sport
- Country: Italy
- Sport: Athletics
- Event: Racewalking
- Club: C.S. Aeronautica Militare

Achievements and titles
- Personal bests: 20 Km: 1:23:55 (2016); 50 Km: 3:49:07 (2017)
Medal record
European Race Walking Cup
Bronze medal – third place	2017 Poděbrady	20 km walk

Michele Antonelli (born 23 May 1994) is an Italian male racewalker who competed in the 2017 World Championships in Athletics.

== Biography ==
He was the Italian champion at senior level of 50 km race walk in 2016 and bronze in the 2017 European Race Walking Cup in 50 km (Poděbrady 21 May 2017). He has the third all-time Italian performance under 23 of the 50 km behind Alex Schwazer and Gianni Perricelli. In 2018, he competed in the men's 50 kilometres walk at the 2018 European Athletics Championships held in Berlin, Germany. He did not finish his race.

== Achievements ==
Year	Competition	Venue	Position	Event	Time	Notes
2017	European Race Walking Cup	(Czech Republic) Poděbrady	3rd	50 km walk	3:49:07	
2017	World Championships	(United Kingdom) London	DNF	50 km walk	NM	

== National titles ==
- Italian Athletics Championships
  - 50 km walk: 2016, 2019
