= Gabriel Bordier =

French racewalker (born 1997)

Personal information
- Born: 8 October 1997 (age 28) Laval, Mayenne, France
- Height: 1.77 m (5 ft 10 in)

Sport
- Country: France
- Sport: Racewalking
Medal record
Men's racewalking
Representing France
European Race Walking Team Championships
Bronze medal – third place	2025 Poděbrady	20 km walk
European U23 Championships
Bronze medal – third place	2017 Bydgoszcz	20 km walk

Gabriel Bordier (born 8 October 1997) is a French racewalker. He competed in the men's 20 kilometres walk at the 2019 World Athletics Championships held in Doha, Qatar. He finished in 24th place.

In 2016, he competed in the men's 10,000 metres walk at the 2016 IAAF World U20 Championships held in Bydgoszcz, Poland. He finished in 11th place.

In 2017, he won the bronze medal in the men's 20 kilometres walk at the European Athletics U23 Championships held in Bydgoszcz, Poland. In the same year, he also competed in the men's 20 kilometres walk at the 2017 Summer Universiade held in Taipei, Taiwan. He finished in 16th place.

In 2019, he also competed in the men's 20 kilometres walk at the European Athletics U23 Championships held in Gävle, Sweden. He did not finish his race.
