= Aku Partanen =

Finnish racewalker (born 1991)

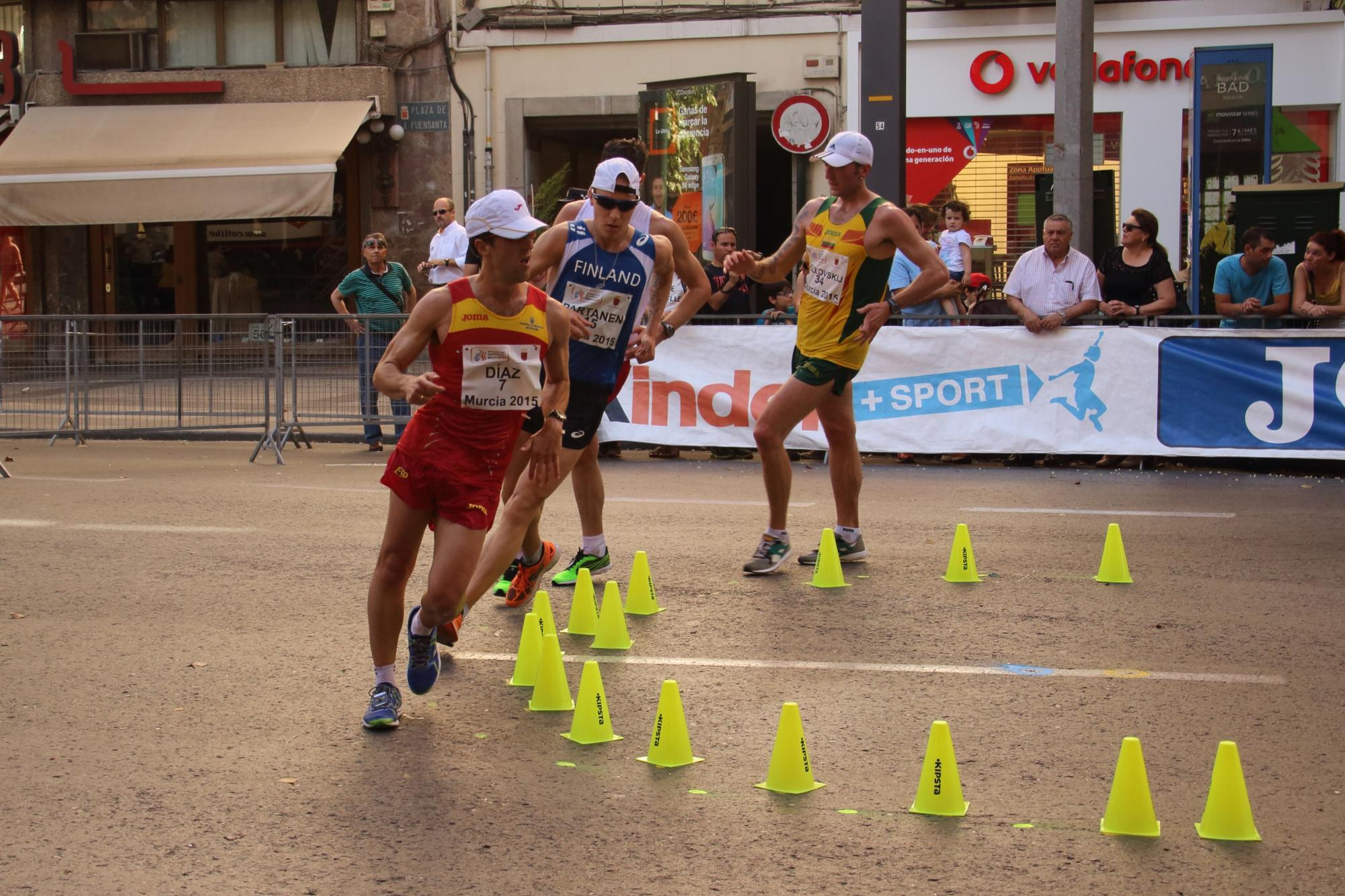

Personal information
- Full name: Veli-Matti Partanen
- Born: 28 October 1991 (age 34) Lappeenranta, Finland
- Height: 1.80 m (5 ft 11 in)
- Weight: 55 kg (121 lb)

Sport
- Country: Finland
- Sport: Athletics
- Event: 50km Race Walk

Achievements and titles
- Personal best: 20 km: 1:18:22 (2023)

Veli-Matti "Aku" Partanen (born 28 October 1991 in Lappeenranta) is a Finnish racewalker who competes mostly at the 50 kilometres race walk. Partanen's club is Lappeenrannan Urheilumiehet.

Partanen competed at the 2013 World Championships in Moscow, where he was 41st at 50 kilometres. At the 2014 European Championships, in Zürich, Partanen was 18th. His time was 3:52:58. In 2018, he competed in the men's 50 kilometres walk at the 2018 European Athletics Championships held in Berlin, Germany. He did not finish his race. In 2019, he competed in the men's 50 kilometres walk at the 2019 World Athletics Championships held in Doha, Qatar. He did not finish his race.

Partanen's original name was Veli-Matti, but he changed his name to Aku because everyone called him Aku.

In 2021, he represented Finland at the 2020 Summer Olympics, where he finished 9th in the men's 50 kilometres walk and set a season best of 3:52:39.

== Records ==
- 50 kilometres race walk: 3.49.02 (Dudince 2015)
