= Eduard Zabuzhenko =

Ukrainian racewalker (born 1998)

Personal information
- Born: 18 April 1998 (age 28) Khmelnytskyi, Ukraine

Sport
- Country: Ukraine
- Sport: Racewalking

Eduard Ihorevych Zabuzhenko (Ukrainian: Едуард Ігоревич Забуженко; born 18 April 1998) is a Ukrainian racewalker.

== Career ==
He represented Ukraine at the 2019 World Athletics Championships in Doha, Qatar and at the 2020 Summer Olympics in Tokyo, Japan.

In 2016, he competed in the men's 10,000 metres walk at the 2016 IAAF World U20 Championships held in Bydgoszcz, Poland. He finished in 23rd place.

In 2019, he competed in the men's 20 kilometres walk at the 2019 European Athletics U23 Championships held in Gävle, Sweden. He finished in 4th place. In that same year, he also competed in the men's 20 kilometres walk at the 2019 World Athletics Championships held in Doha, Qatar. He finished in 34th place.

He competed in the men's 20 kilometres walk at the 2020 Summer Olympics held in Tokyo, Japan.
