= Viktor Shumik =

Ukrainian racewalker (born 1998)

Personal information
- Native name: Віктор Шумік
- Born: 21 May 1998 (age 28)

Sport
- Country: Ukraine
- Sport: Racewalking
Medal record
Men's racewalking
Representing Ukraine
Military World Games
Silver medal – second place	2019 Wuhan	20 km walk

Viktor Ruslanovych Shumik (Ukrainian: Віктор Русланович Шумік; born 21 May 1998) is a Ukrainian racewalker. In 2019, he competed in the men's 20 kilometres walk at the 2019 World Athletics Championships held in Doha, Qatar. He finished in 30th place.

In 2019, he also competed in the men's 20 kilometres walk at the 2019 European Athletics U23 Championships held in Gävle, Sweden. He finished in 10th place.
