= Dzmitry Dziubin =

Belarusian racewalker

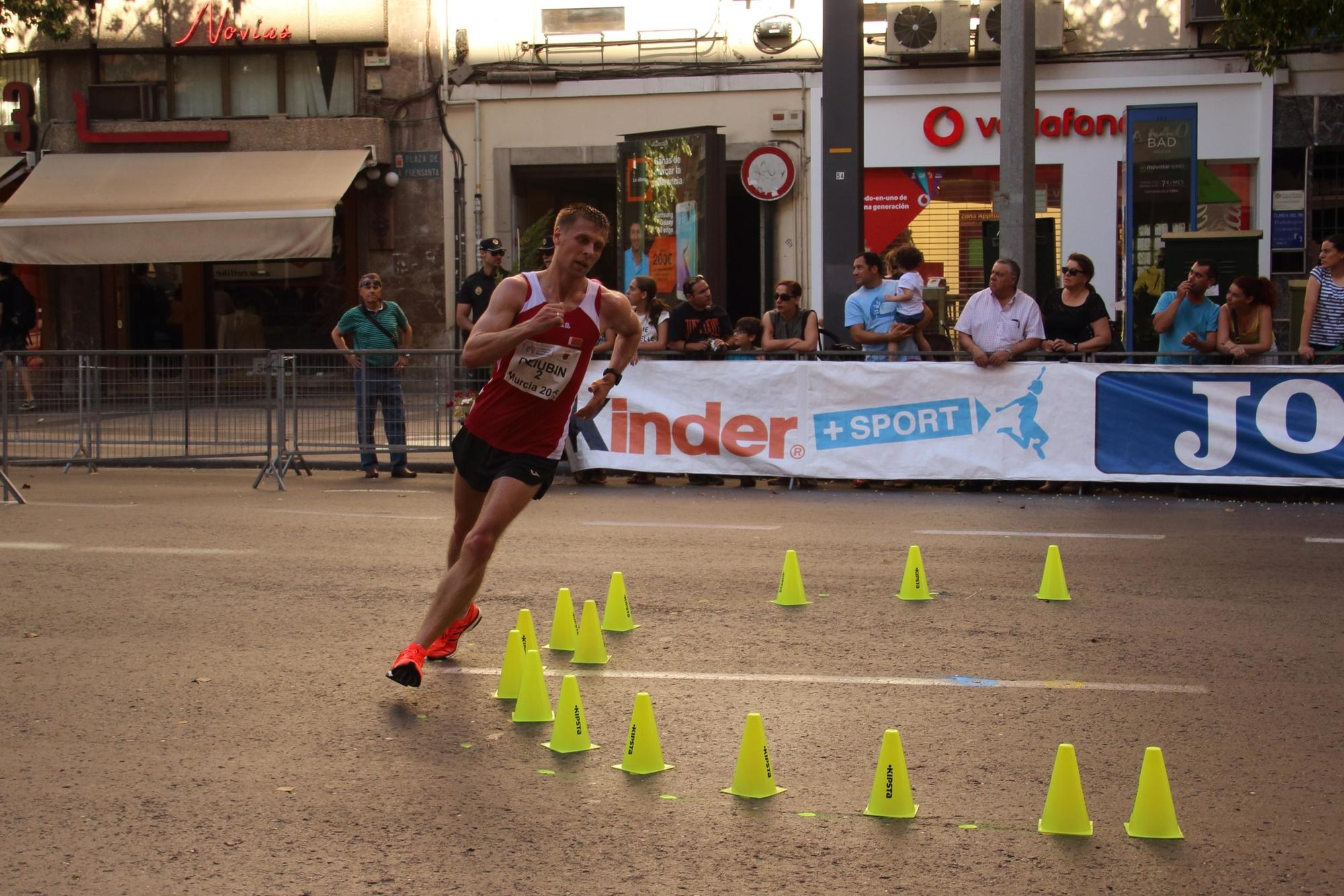
- Dziubin in 2015

Personal information
- Born: 12 July 1990 (age 35)

Sport
- Country: Belarus
- Sport: Athletics

Achievements and titles
- Personal best(s): 20 km walk: 1:22:21 (2017); 50 km walk 3:45:51 (2019)
Medal record
European Championships
Bronze medal – third place	2018 Berlin	50 km walk

Dzmitry Mikhailavich Dziubin (Belarusian: Дзмітрый Міхайлавіч Дзюбін; born 12 July 1990) is a Belarusian male racewalking athlete. He was the bronze medallist in the 50 kilometres race walk at the 2018 European Athletics Championships and won silver medals in that event at the European Race Walking Cup and Military World Games in 2019. He has represented Belarus twice at the World Athletics Championships (2017 and 2019) and is a five-time participant at the World Race Walking Team Championships.

He made his international debut at the age of seventeen at the 2007 World Youth Championships in Athletics, placing 17th in the 10,000 m walk. His senior debut came four years later in the 50 km walk at the 2011 European Race Walking Cup, though he failed to finish the distance. In 2013 he won national titles in the indoor 10,000 m and the 50 km outdoors. He was runner-up at the Alytus International Race Walking Festival in 2014. He finished his first international 20 km race at the 2014 IAAF World Race Walking Cup but managed only 47th.

== International competitions ==
Year	Competition	Venue	Position	Event	Notes
2007	World Youth Championships	Ostrava, Czech Republic	14th	10,000 m walk	46:11.87
2009	World Race Walking Cup	Cheboksary, Russia	35th	10 km walk	44:47
2009	European Race Walking Cup	Metz, France	17th	10 km walk	44:53
2011	European Race Walking Cup	Olhão, Portugal	—	50 km walk	DNF
2012	World Race Walking Cup	Saransk, Russia	34th	50 km walk	4:03:53
2013	European Race Walking Cup	Dudince, Slovakia	—	50 km walk	DNF
2014	World Race Walking Cup	Taicang, China	47th	20 km walk	1:23:13
2015	European Race Walking Cup	Murcia, Spain	—	20 km walk	DNF
2016	World Race Walking Team Championships	Rome, Italy	40th	20 km walk	1:23:32
2017	European Race Walking Cup	Poděbrady, Czech Republic	11th	20 km walk	1:22:21
2017	World Championships	London, United Kingdom	49th	20 km walk	1:25:41
2018	World Race Walking Team Championships	Taicang, China	13th	50 km walk	3:52:25
2018	European Championships	Berlin, Germany	3rd	50 km walk	3:47:59
2019	European Race Walking Cup	Alytus, Lithuania	2nd	50 km walk	3:45:51
2019	World Championships	Doha, Qatar	—	50 km walk	DNF
2019	Military World Games	Wuhan, China	2nd	50 km walk	3:53:14

== National titles ==
- Belarusian Athletics Championships
  - 50 km walk: 2013
- Belarusian Indoor Athletics Championships
  - 10,000 m walk: 2013, 2017
