= Ruslans Smolonskis =

Latvian racewalker (born 1996)

Personal information
- Born: 15 December 1996 (age 29)

Sport
- Country: Latvia
- Sport: Racewalking

Ruslans Smolonskis (born 15 December 1996) is a Latvian racewalker. In 2019, he competed in the men's 50 kilometres walk at the 2019 World Athletics Championships held in Doha, Qatar. He was disqualified after a fourth red card.

In 2017, he finished in 16th place in the men's 20 kilometres walk at the 2017 European Athletics U23 Championships held in Bydgoszcz, Poland.
