= Lukáš Gdula =

Czech racewalker (born 1991)

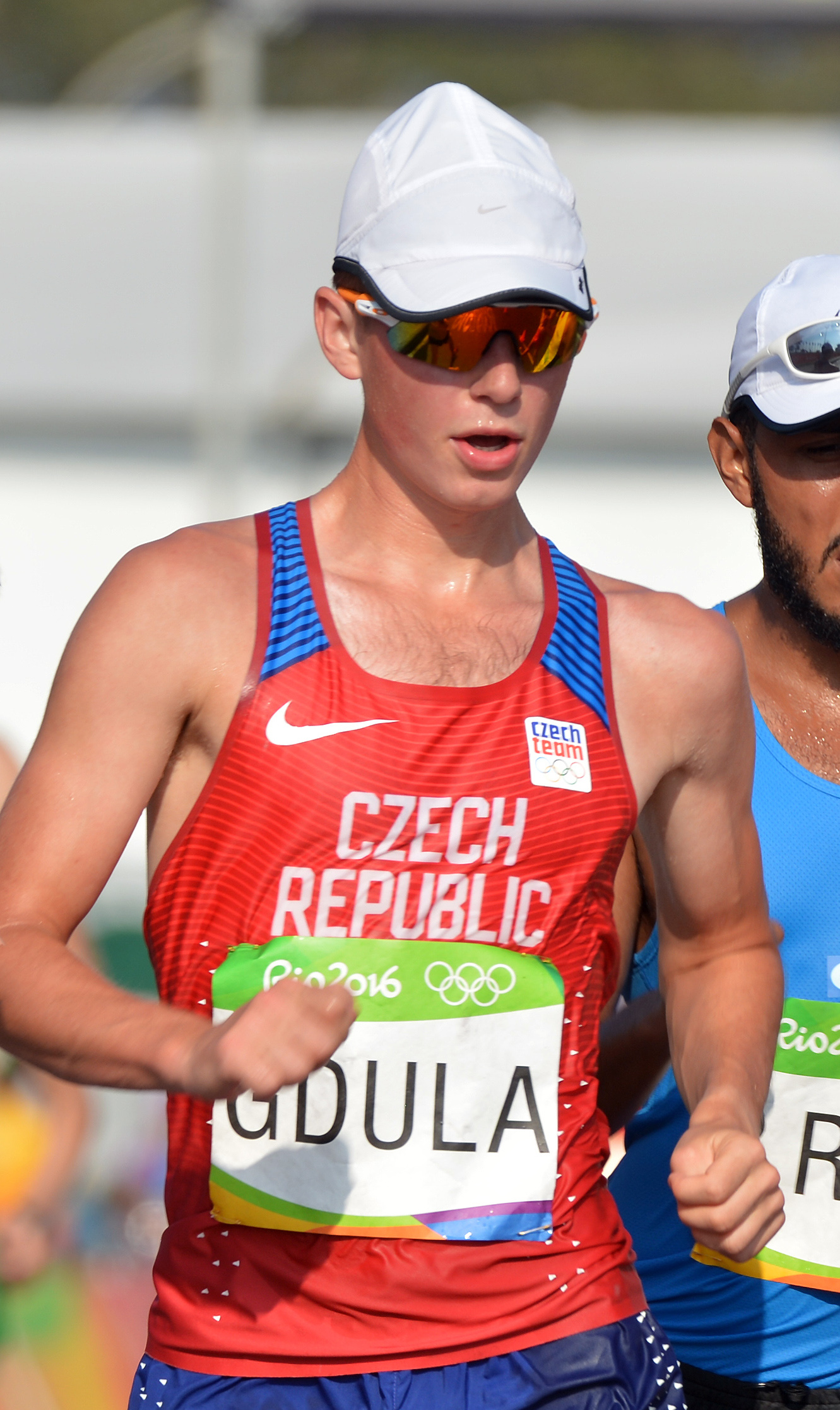
- Gdula at the 2016 Olympics

Personal information
- Born: 6 December 1991 (age 34) Hrochův Týnec, Czech Republic
- Height: 178 cm (5 ft 10 in)
- Weight: 65 kg (143 lb)

Sport
- Country: Czech Republic
- Sport: Track and field
- Event: Racewalking

Achievements and titles
- Personal bests: 10 km – 43:14 (2010); 20 km – 1:25:50 (2016); 50 km – 3:54:29 (2016)
- Updated on 29 August 2015

Lukáš Gdula (born 6 December 1991) is a Czech racewalker. He competed in the 50 km event at the 2015 World Championships and 2016 Olympics. In 2018, he competed in the men's 50 kilometres walk at the 2018 European Athletics Championships held in Berlin, Germany. He finished in 21st place.
