= Salih Korkmaz =

Turkish racewalker (born 1997)

Personal information
- Full name: Salih Korkmaz
- Nationality: Turkish
- Born: 1 January 1997 (age 29) Arguvan, Turkey

Sport
- Country: Turkey
- Sport: Athletics
- Event: Race walking
Medal record
European U23 Championships
Silver medal – second place	2019 Gävle	20 km walk
Summer World University Games
Gold medal – first place	2021 Chengdu	20 km walk

Salih Korkmaz (born 1 January 1997) is a Turkish racewalking athlete.

In 2017, he finished in 4th place in the men's 20 kilometres walk at the 2017 European Athletics U23 Championships held in Bydgoszcz, Poland.

Representing Turkey at the 2019 World Athletics Championships, he placed fifth in 20 kilometres walk. He won the silver medal at the 2019 European Athletics U23 Championships held in Gävle, Sweden.
