= Bence Venyercsán =

Hungarian race walker

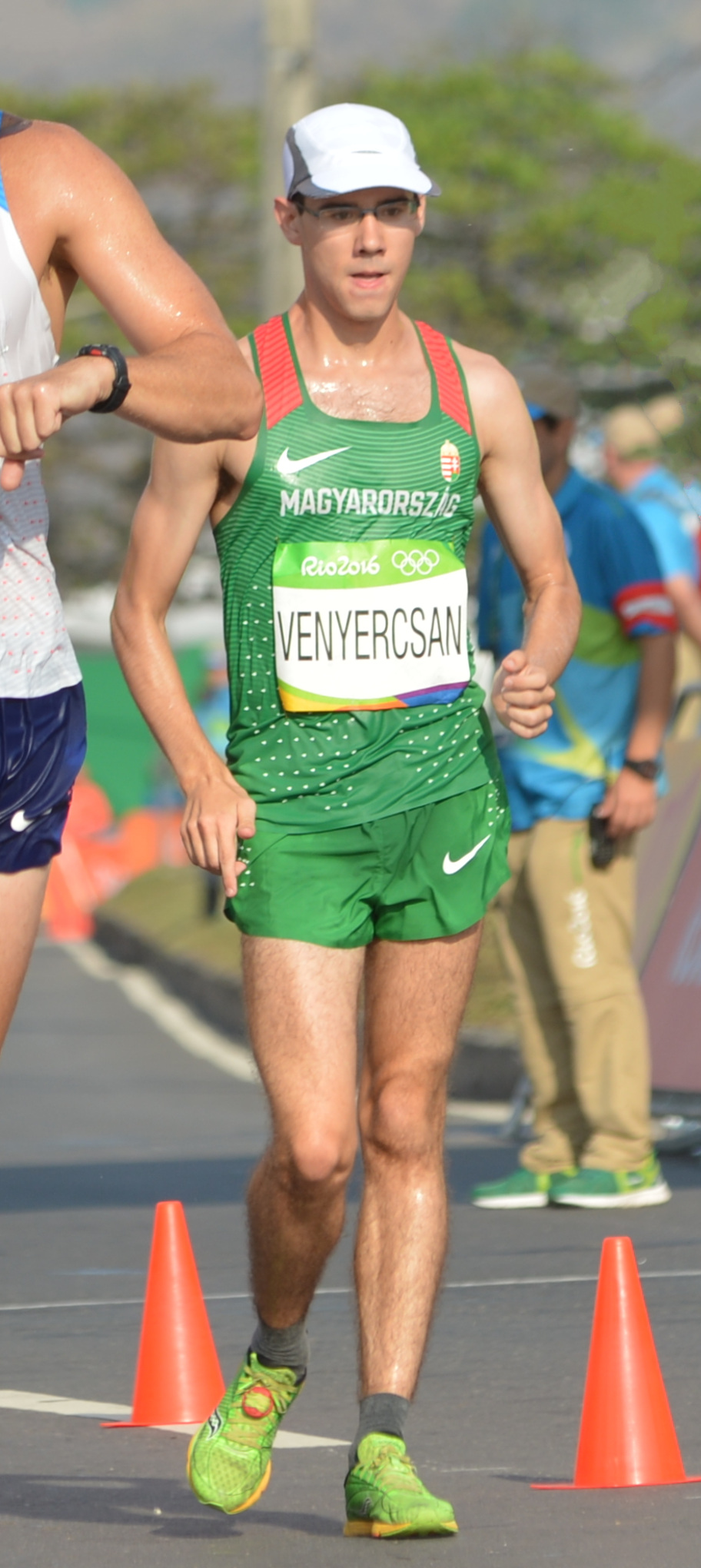
- Venyercsán at the 2016 Olympics

Personal information
- Full name: Bence Barnabás Venyercsán
- Born: 8 January 1996 (age 30) Székesfehérvár, Hungary
- Education: Eötvös Loránd University
- Height: 173 cm (5 ft 8 in)
- Weight: 56 kg (123 lb)

Sport
- Sport: Athletics
- Event: Race walking

Achievements and titles
- Personal bests: 10 km – 42:07 (2015); 20 km – 1:28:24 (2014); 50 km – 4:02:35 (2016)

Bence Barnabás Venyercsán (born 8 January 1996) is a Hungarian race walker. He finished 45th in the 50 km event at the 2016 Summer Olympics and 20th in the men's 50 kilometres walk at the 2020 Summer Olympics.

He started competing when he was 13 years old and finished 8th in the 2013 World Youth Championship. He finished 21st in the 2014 Junior World Championship and 8th in the Junior Eb in 2015. in 2017, he won 17th place in the Summer Universiade for 20 kilometers.

In 2017, he finished in 12th place in the men's 20 kilometres walk at the 2017 European Athletics U23 Championships held in Bydgoszcz, Poland. In 2018, he competed in the men's 50 kilometres walk at the 2018 European Athletics Championships held in Berlin, Germany. He finished in 13th place.
