= Aleksi Ojala =

Finnish racewalker

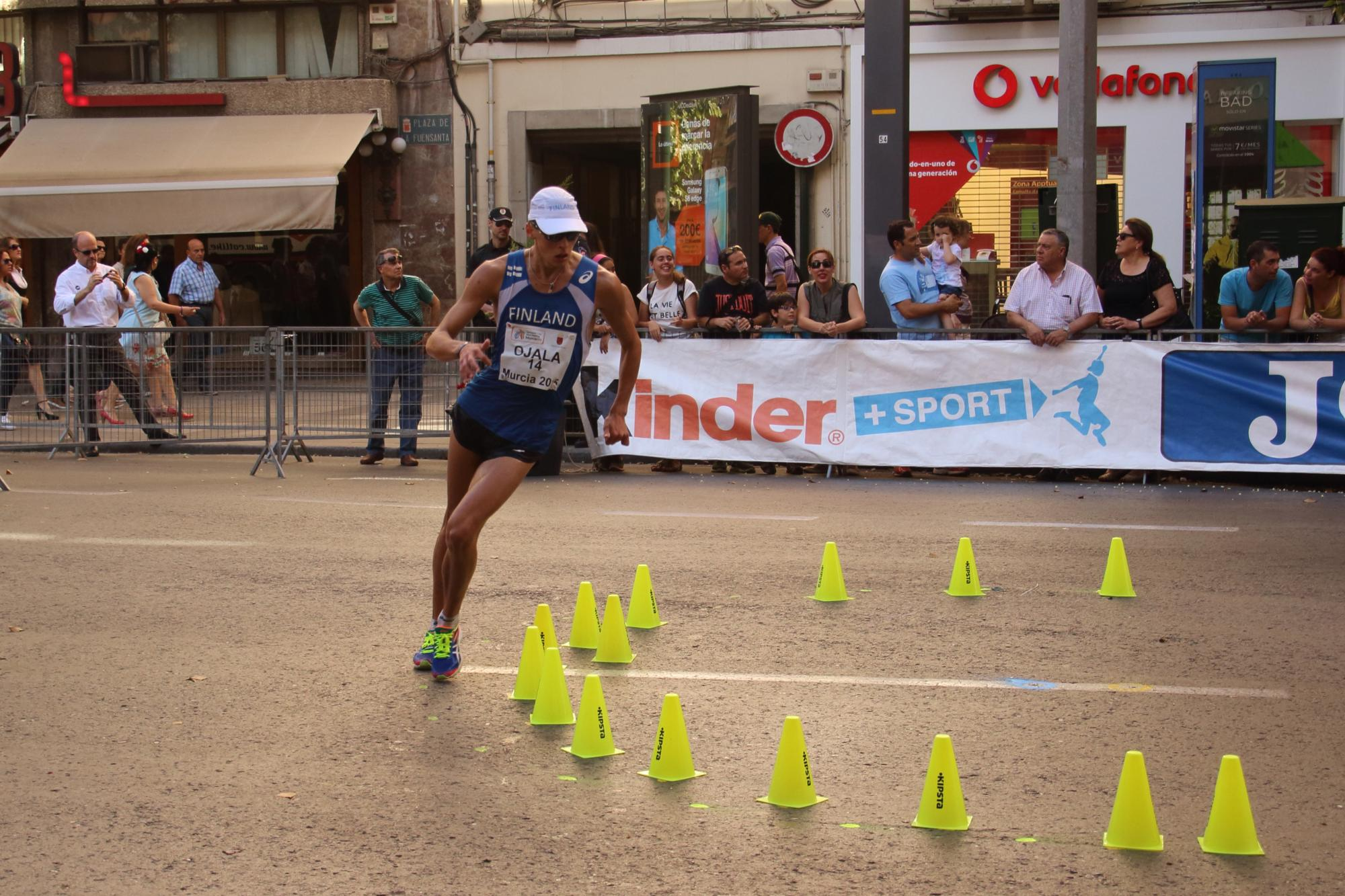
- Ojala at the 2015 European Cup Race Walking

Personal information
- Born: 9 December 1992 (age 32) Urjala, Finland

Sport
- Country: Finland
- Sport: Athletics
- Event: 50km Race Walk

Aleksi Ojala (born 9 December 1992 in Urjala) is a Finnish racewalker who competes mostly at the 50 kilometres race walk. Ojala's club is Urjalan Urheilijat.

After some initial disappointing world championship results, Ojala achieved two top-20 World Athletics Championships finishes. At the 2015 World Championships in Beijing, he did not finish the 50 kilometres. However two years later, he finished 14th at the 2017 World Championship 50 km walk.

In 2018, he competed in the men's 50 kilometres walk at the 2018 European Athletics Championships held in Berlin, Germany, but he failed to finish again. He rebounded in the new 35 km walk at the 2022 World Championships, where he finished 13th and was the best racewalker from his country.

In July 2024, Ojala retired from the sport.

== Records ==
- 50 kilometres race walk: 3.57.14 (Dudince 2015)
