= Nathaniel Seiler =

German racewalker

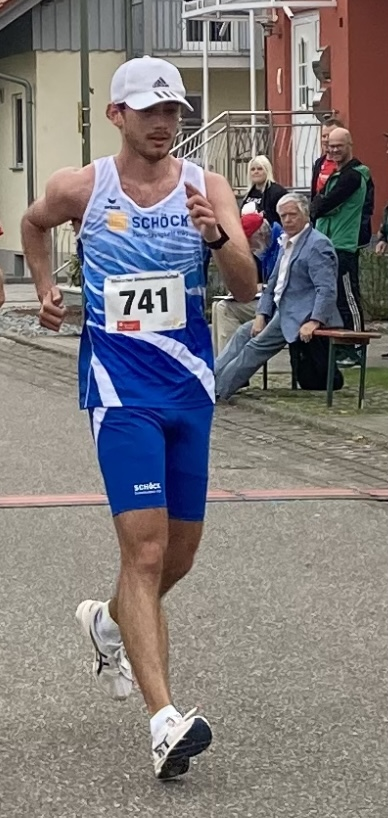
- 20 km walk in Biberach/Baden, 2022

Personal information
- Born: 6 April 1996 (age 29) Baden-Baden

Sport
- Country: Germany
- Sport: Racewalking
- Coached by: Robert Ihly

Nathaniel Seiler (born 6 April 1996) is a Filipino-German racewalker. In 2019, he competed in the men's 50 kilometres walk at the 2019 World Athletics Championships held in Doha, Qatar. He did not finish his race.

In 2014, he competed in the men's 10,000 metres walk at the 2014 World Junior Championships in Athletics held in Eugene, Oregon, United States. In 2017, he was disqualified in the men's 20 kilometres walk at the 2017 European Athletics U23 Championships held in Bydgoszcz, Poland. The following year, he competed in the men's 50 kilometres walk at the 2018 European Athletics Championships held in Berlin, Germany. He finished in 8th place.
