= Vít Hlaváč =

Czech racewalker

Personal information
- Born: 26 February 1997 (age 29), Czech Republic
- Height: 185 cm (6 ft 1 in)
- Weight: 65 kg (143 lb)

Sport
- Country: Czech Republic
- Sport: Track and field
- Event: Racewalking

Achievements and titles
- Personal best(s): 20 km – 1:26:55 (2019); 35 km – 2:32:50 (2022); 50 km – 3:52:54 (2021)
- Updated on 2021

Vít Hlaváč (born 26 February 1997) is a Czech racewalker.

He won the National title 3 times:

- 50 km race walk on track: 3:56:29 (NR) at Mestský atletický štadión, Trnava (SVK) 5 December 2020
- 50 km Race Walk: 3:52:54 in Dudince (SVK) 20 March 2021
- 20 km Race Walk: 1:29:12 in Olomouc (CZE) 10 April 2021
- "Vít Hlaváč, A Student Of The Faculty Of Biomedical Engineering, Won The Title Of 50 Km Walk Champion Of The Czech Republic, A National Record".

National record:

- 35 km Race Walk: 2:32:50 (NR) in Eugene, Oregon (USA) 24 July 2022
