= Callum Wilkinson =

British race walker (born 1997)

Personal information
- Nationality: British (English)
- Born: 14 March 1997 (age 29) Moulton, Suffolk, England

Sport
- Sport: Athletics
- Event: Race walking
- Club: Enfield and Haringey AC; Togher Athletic Club
- Coached by: Rob Heffernan

Achievements and titles
- Personal best: 1:20:34 for 20k
Medal record
Men's athletics
Representing Great Britain
World Junior Championships
Gold medal – first place	2016 Bydgoszcz	10,000 m walk

Callum Wilkinson (born 14 March 1997) is a British race walker. He competed at the 2020 Summer Olympics and 2024 Summer Olympics.

== Biography ==
Wilkinson won a gold medal in the 10,000 m walk at the IAAF World U20 Championships in Bydgoszcz, Poland. He represented Great Britain in the 20 km walk at the 2017 World Championships, finishing in 41st position and in 2017 was ranked 2nd overall in the UK for 20 km walk.

At the 2019 European Athletics U23 Championships in Gävle, Sweden. He won a bronze medal in the 20 kilometres walk.

He became a double British champion when successfully defending his title and winning the 5,000 metres walk event at the 2020 British Athletics Championships in a time of 19 min 25.94 secs.

Wilkinson represented Great Britain in the 20km race walk at the delayed 2020 Summer Olympics. He came tenth in a time of 1:22:38.

After winning the 10,000 metres walk gold medal at the 2024 British Athletics Championships, Wilkinson was subsequently named in the Great Britain team for the 2024 Olympic Games. He finished 16th in the 20 kilometres walk at the Games in Paris.
