= Håvard Haukenes =

Norwegian racewalker (born 1990)

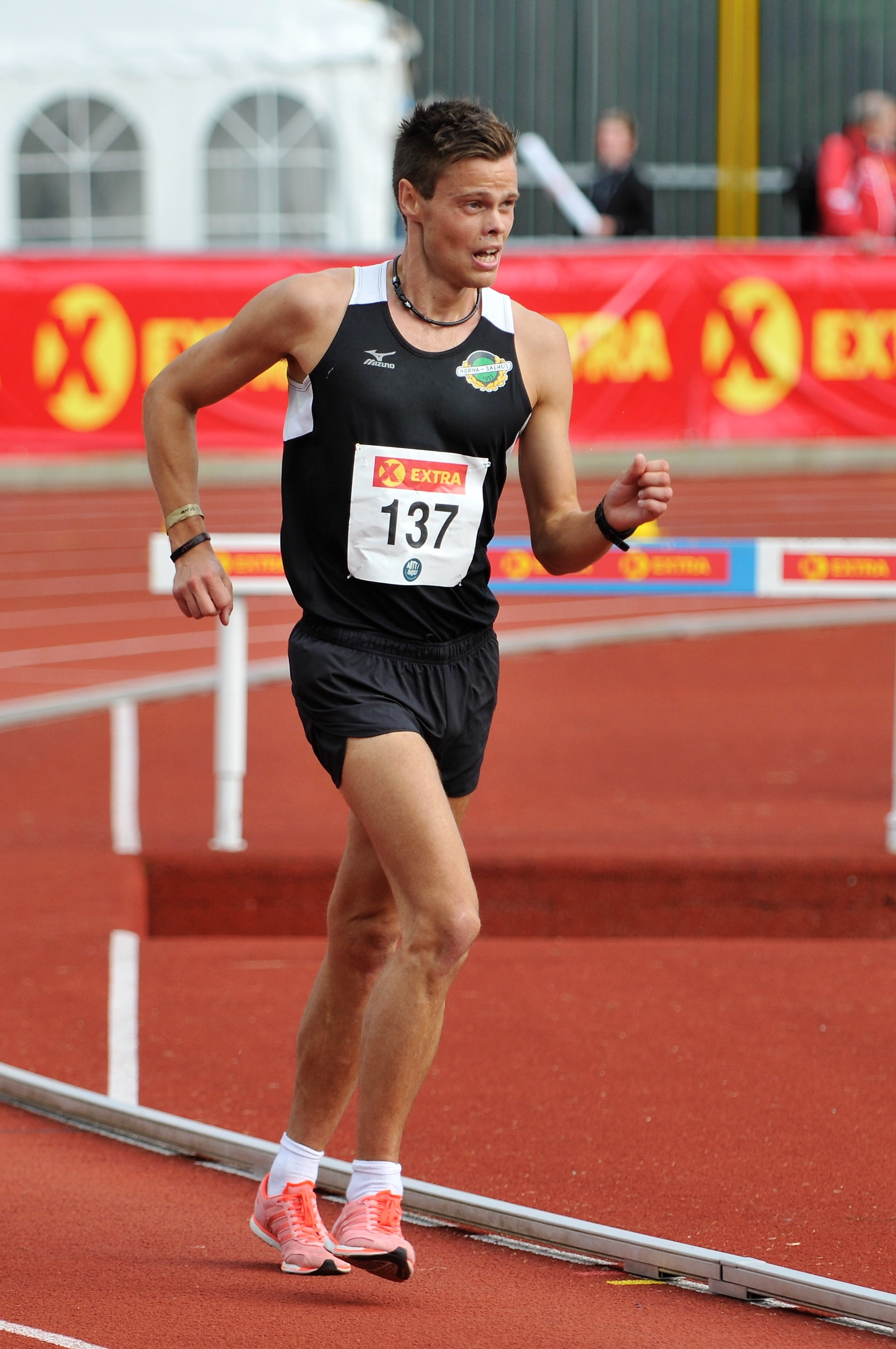
- Haukenes in 2017

Personal information
- Born: 22 April 1990 (age 36) Bergen

Sport
- Country: Norway
- Sport: Track and field
- Event: racewalking

Håvard Haukenes (born 22 April 1990) is a Norwegian athlete. He has competed in two Olympic games in the 50 kilometre walk.

He made his World Championships debut in Moscow 2013, later in 2015 World Championships in Beijing. His first Olympic Games was the 2016 Olympic Games, where he placed 7th in the 50 kilometre walk.

Haukenes was also ranked as world leader in 2017 leading into World Championship in London. In 2018, he finished 4th in the European championship in Berlin. In 2019, he was ranked as number 5 in the world and in 2020 he earned a national record on the 30 km walk. Haukenes competed in the Olympic games in Tokyo 2021 and in several IAAF World Race Walking Cups.

Haukenes was born in Paradis, Bergen and represents the club ILI BUL.
