= 2019 European Race Walking Cup =

- Organisers: EAA
- Edition: 13th
- Date: May 19
- Host city: Alytus, Lithuania
- Events: 6
- Participation: 241 athletes from 29 nations
- Official website: http://www.alytusfestival.lt

The 2019 European Race Walking Cup took place on 19 May, 2019. The races were held on a 1 km lap around the city centre in Alytus, Lithuania. It was the last edition to be held under the name European Race Walking Cup before being renamed to European Race Walking Team Championships from 2021 on.

For the first time European Race Walking Cup also included women's 50 km racewalking event.

== Medallists ==
Event	Gold		Silver		Bronze	
Individual
Men's 20 km	Perseus Karlström; Sweden	1:19:54; EL	Vasiliy Mizinov; Authorised Neutral Athletes	1:20:18	Diego García; Spain	1:20:23; SB
Men's 50 km	Yohann Diniz; France	3:37:43; CR	Dzmitry Dziubin; Belarus	3:45:51; PB	João Vieira; Portugal	4:46:38
Men's 10 km Junior (U20)	Riccardo Orsoni; Italy	42:43; PB	Pedro Conesa; Spain	43:18	Łukasz Niedziałek; Poland	43:28
Women's 20 km	Živilė Vaiciukevičiūtė; Lithuania	1:29:48; SB	Laura García-Caro; Spain	1:29:55; SB	Raquel González; Spain	1:30:17; SB
Women's 50 km	Eleonora Giorgi; Italy	4:04:50; ER	Júlia Takács; Spain	4:05:46; NR	Inês Henriques; Portugal	4:13:57
Women's 10 km Junior (U20)	Meryem Bekmez; Turkey	45:37	Evin Demir; Turkey	46:49	Pauline Stey; France	47:53
Team
Men's 20 km	Spain	14	Great Britain	38	Ukraine	38
Men's 50 km	Ukraine	26	Spain	43	Belarus	49
Men's 10 km Junior (U20)	Italy	7	Spain	9	Turkey	23
Women's 20 km	Spain	16	Italy; Eleonora Dominici; Valentina Trapletti; Nicole Colombi; Antonella Palmisano	27	Belarus	33
Women's 50 km	Ukraine	18	Spain	21	Italy; Eleonora Giorgi; Mariavittoria Becchetti; Federica Curiazzi; Beatrice Foresti	27
Women's 10 km Junior (U20)	Turkey	3	France	11	Spain	16

== Race results ==
=== Men's 20 km ===
Individual race
Rank	Athlete	Country	Time	Notes
1st place, gold medalist(s)	Perseus Karlström	Sweden	1:19:54	SB
2nd place, silver medalist(s)	Vasiliy Mizinov	Authorised Neutral Athletes	1:20:18	
3rd place, bronze medalist(s)	Diego García	Spain	1:20:23	SB
4	Tom Bosworth	Great Britain	1:20:53	SB
5	Álvaro Martín	Spain	1:20:59	SB
6	Miguel Ángel López	Spain	1:21:00	SB
7	Massimo Stano	Italy	1:21:12	SB
8	Gabriel Bordier	France	1:21:43	PB
9	Callum Wilkinson	Great Britain	1:21:54	
10	Ivan Losev	Ukraine	1:22:21	
11	Eduard Zabuzhenko	Ukraine	1:22:40	
12	Christopher Linke	Germany	1:23:21	
13	Salih Korkmaz	Turkey	1:23:46	
14	Matteo Giupponi	Italy	1:23:49	
15	Marius Žiūkas	Lithuania	1:23:58	
16	Kévin Campion	France	1:24:21	
17	Viktor Shumik	Ukraine	1:24:30	
18	Nils Brembach	Germany	1:24:42	
19	Federico Tontodonati	Italy	1:24:49	
20	Miguel Carvalho	Portugal	1:24:53	SB
21	Cian McManamon	Ireland	1:24:59	SB
22	Rafał Augustyn	Poland	1:25:15	
23	Damian Błocki	Poland	1:25:25	
24	Hagen Pohle	Germany	1:25:38	
25	Cameron Corbishley	Great Britain	1:25:45	PB
26	Alex Wright	Ireland	1:25:51	
27	Sahin Senoduncu	Turkey	1:26:10	
28	Dzmitry Lukyanchuk	Belarus	1:26:18	SB
29	Abdulselam Imük	Turkey	1:26:26	PB
30	Miroslav Úradník	Slovakia	1:26:37	
31	David Kenny	Ireland	1:26:50	PB
32	Luis Alberto Amezcua	Spain	1:27:26	
33	Dawid Tomala	Poland	1:27:31	
34	Dominik Černý	Slovakia	1:27:58	
35	Aleksey Shevchuk	Authorised Neutral Athletes	1:28:47	SB
36	Oleh Svystun	Ukraine	1:30:12	
37	Antonin Boyez	France	1:32:04	
38	Genadij Kozlovskij	Lithuania	1:32:51	
39	Vít Hlaváč	Czech Republic	1:34:28	
40	Normunds Ivzāns	Latvia	1:36:14	SB
41	Edgars Gjačs	Latvia	1:43:20	SB
42	Darius Jezepčikas	Lithuania	1:43:32	SB
43	Igor Jakovlev	Estonia	2:03:26	PB
44	Andrei Baulin	Estonia	2:08:31	PB
	Miguel Rodrigues	Portugal	DNF	
	Francesco Fortunato	Italy	DNF	
	Keny Guinaudeau	France	DNF	
	Máté Helebrandt	Hungary	DNF	
	Håvard Haukenes	Norway	DNF	
	Raivo Saulgriezis	Latvia	DNF	
	Yeoryios Tzatzimakis	Greece	DNF	
	Dominic King	Great Britain	DQ	

Team race
Place	Country	Points
1st place, gold medalist(s)	Spain	14 pts
2nd place, silver medalist(s)	United Kingdom	38 pts
3rd place, bronze medalist(s)	Ukraine	38 pts
4	Italy	40 pts
5	Germany	54 pts
6	France	61 pts
7	Turkey	69 pts
8	Ireland	78 pts
9	Poland	78 pts
10	Lithuania	95 pts
11	Latvia	NM

=== Men's 50 km ===
Individual race
Rank	Athlete	Country	Time	Notes
1st place, gold medalist(s)	Yohann Diniz	France	3:37:43	WL
2nd place, silver medalist(s)	Dzmitry Dziubin	Belarus	3:45:51	PB
3rd place, bronze medalist(s)	João Vieira	Portugal	3:46:38	SB
4	Artur Brzozowski	Poland	3:46:42	PB
5	Brendan Boyce	Ireland	3:48:13	PB
6	Ivan Banzeruk	Ukraine	3:48:40	SB
7	Valeriy Litanyuk	Ukraine	3:51:27	PB
8	José Ignacio Díaz	Spain	3:52:00	SB
9	Michele Antonelli	Italy	3:52:09	SB
10	Artur Mastianica	Lithuania	3:55:40	PB
11	Alexandros Papamichail	Greece	3:56:19	SB
12	Arnis Rumbenieks	Latvia	3:57:09	PB
13	Serhiy Budza	Ukraine	3:57:34	SB
14	Nathaniel Seiler	Germany	3:57:49	SB
15	Jesús Ángel García	Spain	3:57:51	
16	Narcis Mihaila	Romania	3:58:17	PB
17	Jonathan Hilbert	Germany	3:58:21	SB
18	Ruslans Smolonskis	Latvia	3:58:35	PB
19	Marco De Luca	Italy	3:58:54	SB
20	Marc Tur	Spain	3:59:59	
21	Carl Dohmann	Germany	4:02:41	SB
22	Aliaksandr Liakhovich	Belarus	4:02:43	PB
23	Dmytro Sobchuk	Ukraine	4:03:13	SB
24	Marius Cocioran	Romania	4:04:04	SB
25	Uladzimir Kalesnik	Belarus	4:08:19	PB
26	Benjamín Sánchez	Spain	4:13:54	
27	Hugo Andrieu	France	4:14:29	SB
28	Karl Junghannß	Germany	4:14:52	
29	Bruno Erent	Croatia	4:27:39	
30	Gregorio Angelini	Italy	4:30:26	
31	Virgo Adusoo	Estonia	4:35:13	PB
32	Dávid Tokodi	Hungary	4:39:47	
	Andrea Agrusti	Italy	DNF	
	Aleksi Ojala	Finland	DNF	
	Lukáš Gdula	Czech Republic	DNF	
	Michal Morvay	Slovakia	DNF	
	Ato Ibáñez	Sweden	DNF	
	Jakub Jelonek	Poland	DNF	
	Rafał Sikora	Poland	DNF	
	Andrei Gafita	Romania	DNF	
	Rick Liesting	Netherlands	DNF	
	Mert Atlı	Turkey	DNF	
	Miklós Srp	Hungary	DNF	
	Aurélien Quinion	France	DNF	
	Tomasz Bagdány	Hungary	DNF	
	Tadas Šuškevičius	Lithuania	DQ	

Team race
Place	Country	Points
1st place, gold medalist(s)	Ukraine	26 pts
2nd place, silver medalist(s)	Spain	43 pts
3rd place, bronze medalist(s)	Belarus	49 pts
4	Germany	52 pts
5	Italy	58 pts
	France	NM
	Poland	NM
	Romania	NM
	Hungary	NM

=== Men's 10 km (U20) ===
Individual race
Rank	Athlete	Country	Time	Notes
1st place, gold medalist(s)	Riccardo Orsoni	Italy	42:43	PB
2nd place, silver medalist(s)	Pedro Conesa	Spain	43:18	SB
3rd place, bronze medalist(s)	Łukasz Niedziałek	Poland	43:28	
4	Selman Ilhan	Turkey	43:41	
5	Christopher Snook	Great Britain	43:45	
6	Aldo Andrei	Italy	43:45	PB
7	Eloy Hornero	Spain	44:07	
8	Mattéo Duc	France	44:08	PB
9	Gabriele Gamba	Italy	44:19	
10	Ihor Honcharenko	Ukraine	44:28	PB
11	Daniel Kováč	Slovakia	44:41	
12	Jakob Johannes Schmidt	Germany	44:45	
13	Anton Bildziuha	Belarus	44:49	
14	Taras Koretskyy	Ukraine	44:57	PB
15	Martin Madeline-Degy	France	45:08	
16	Oisin Lane	Ireland	45:17	PB
17	José Mestre	Spain	45:20	
18	Vladyslav Biryukov	Ukraine	45:24	
19	Mustafa Tekdal	Turkey	46:01	
20	Ryan Gognies	France	46:09	
21	Pavel Oliohovik	Belarus	46:30	
22	Norbert Tóth	Hungary	46:33	
23	Ion-Adrian Dumitru	Romania	46:38	SB
24	Johannes Frenzl	Germany	47:30	SB
25	Ruben Santos	Portugal	47:45	PB
26	Ruslan Sergatšjov	Estonia	47:56	SB
27	Carlos Mihai Neag	Romania	49:06	PB
28	Nathan Bonzon	Switzerland	49:26	
29	Paulius Juozaitis	Lithuania	50:46	
30	Otto Junghannß	Germany	52:18	
31	Dmitri Butsenko	Estonia	53:22	PB
32	Rostislav Rožnovský	Czech Republic	54:49	
	Özgür Topsakal	Turkey	DNF	

Team race
Place	Country	Points
1st place, gold medalist(s)	Italy	7 pts
2nd place, silver medalist(s)	Spain	9 pts
3rd place, bronze medalist(s)	Turkey	23 pts
4	France	23 pts
5	Ukraine	24 pts
6	Belarus	34 pts
7	Germany	36 pts
8	Romania	50 pts
9	Estonia	57 pts

=== Women's 20 km ===
Individual race
Rank	Athlete	Country	Time	Notes
1st place, gold medalist(s)	Živilė Vaiciukevičiūtė	Lithuania	1:29:48	SB
2nd place, silver medalist(s)	Laura García-Caro	Spain	1:29:55	SB
3rd place, bronze medalist(s)	Raquel González	Spain	1:30:17	=SB
4	Inna Kashyna	Ukraine	1:30:33	
5	Ana Cabecinha	Portugal	1:31:12	SB
6	Eleonora Dominici	Italy	1:31:30	
7	Daryia Paluektava	Belarus	1:32:28	
8	Valentina Trapletti	Italy	1:32:49	SB
9	Antigoni Drisbioti	Greece	1:33:22	SB
10	Viktoryia Rashchupkina	Belarus	1:33:37	
11	María Pérez	Spain	1:34:08	
12	Mária Czaková	Slovakia	1:34:30	SB
13	Nicole Colombi	Italy	1:34:37	
14	Katarzyna Zdziebło	Poland	1:34:43	
15	Brigita Virbalytė-Dimšienė	Lithuania	1:35:30	
16	Nastassia Rarouskaya	Belarus	1:36:05	
17	Lidia Sánchez-Puebla	Spain	1:36:17	
18	Emilia Lehmeyer	Germany	1:36:22	
19	Yana Smerdova	Authorised Neutral Athletes	1:36:40	SB
20	Monika Vaiciukevičiūtė	Lithuania	1:36:57	
21	Heather Lewis	Great Britain	1:37:43	
22	Ayşe Tekdal	Turkey	1:37:45	
23	Violaine Averous	France	1:38:42	SB
24	Mariya Filyuk	Ukraine	1:38:46	
25	Bethan Davies	Great Britain	1:39:02	SB
26	Olga Niedziałek	Poland	1:39:17	
27	Eloise Terrec	France	1:39:52	
28	Hanna Shevchuk	Ukraine	1:40:12	PB
29	Enni Nurmi	Finland	1:40:25	
30	Panayiota Tsinopoulou	Greece	1:41:32	
31	Ivana Renić	Croatia	1:42:28	
32	Clemence Beretta	France	1:42:38	
33	Barbara Kovács	Hungary	1:42:41	
34	Teresa Zurek	Germany	1:42:54	
35	Amandine Marcou	France	1:43:03	
36	Kate Veale	Ireland	1:43:08	SB
37	Agnieszka Yarokhau	Poland	1:43:29	
38	Monika Hornáková	Slovakia	1:46:53	
39	Tamara Havrylyuk	Ukraine	1:46:58	
40	Erika Kelly	Great Britain	1:47:58	
41	Ema Hačundová	Slovakia	1:50:34	
42	Greta Vainaitė	Lithuania	1:58:31	
43	Lada Rosljakova	Estonia	2:21:42	SB
	Antonella Palmisano	Italy	DNF	
	Hristina Papadopoulou	Greece	DNF	
	Saskia Feige	Germany	DNF	
	Edna Barros	Portugal	DNF	
	Rita Récsei	Hungary	DNF	
	Kathrin Schulze	Austria	DNF	

Team race
Place	Country	Points
1st place, gold medalist(s)	Spain	16 pts
2nd place, silver medalist(s)	Italy	27 pts
3rd place, bronze medalist(s)	Belarus	33 pts
4	Lithuania	36 pts
5	Ukraine	56 pts
6	Poland	77 pts
7	France	82 pts
8	United Kingdom	86 pts
9	Slovakia	91 pts
	Greece	NM
	Germany	NM

=== Women's 50 km ===
Individual race
Rank	Athlete	Country	Time	Notes
1st place, gold medalist(s)	Eleonora Giorgi	Italy	4:04:50	AR
2nd place, silver medalist(s)	Julia Takács	Spain	4:05:46	NR
3rd place, bronze medalist(s)	Inês Henriques	Portugal	4:13:57	SB
4	Valentyna Myronchuk	Ukraine	4:15:50	PB
5	Nastassia Yatsevich	Belarus	4:16:39	PB
6	Olena Sobchuk	Ukraine	4:17:07	PB
7	Nadzeya Darazhuk	Belarus	4:17:29	PB
8	Khrystyna Yudkina	Ukraine	4:19:57	PB
9	Ainhoa Pinedo	Spain	4:21:07	SB
10	Mar Juárez	Spain	4:24:35	PB
11	Mariavittoria Becchetti	Italy	4:26:10	PB
12	Mara Ribeiro	Portugal	4:27:14	PB
13	Aggeliki Makri	Greece	4:29:15	PB
14	Tiia Kuikka	Finland	4:29:25	NR
15	Federica Curiazzi	Italy	4:30:17	PB
16	Agnieszka Ellward	Poland	4:31:19	NR
17	Lyudmyla Shelest	Ukraine	4:36:05	SB
18	Anastasiya Rodzkina	Belarus	4:40:02	PB
19	Andrea Kovács	Hungary	4:40:05	NR
20	Beatrice Foresti	Italy	4:41:03	PB
21	Antonina Lorek	Poland	4:46:44	PB
22	Maria Larios	Spain	4:48:16	SB
23	Lucie Champalou	France	4:49:36	SB
24	Maeva Casale	France	4:52:45	SB
25	Anett Torma	Hungary	5:03:12	SB
26	Valéria Bíróné Molnár	Hungary	5:06:50	
	Tijana Savićević	Serbia	DNF	
	Inès Pastorino	France	DNF	
	Bianka Dittrich	Germany	DNF	
	Paulina Buziak-Śmiatacz	Poland	DQ	

Team race
Place	Country	Points
1st place, gold medalist(s)	Ukraine	18 pts
2nd place, silver medalist(s)	Spain	21 pts
3rd place, bronze medalist(s)	Italy	27 pts
4	Belarus	30 pts
5	Hungary	70 pts
	Poland	NM
	France	NM

=== Women's 10 km (U20) ===
Individual race
Rank	Athlete	Country	Time	Notes
1st place, gold medalist(s)	Meryem Bekmez	Turkey	45:37	
2nd place, silver medalist(s)	Evin Demir	Turkey	46:49	
3rd place, bronze medalist(s)	Pauline Stey	France	47:53	PB
4	Jekaterina Mirotvortseva	Estonia	48:05	NR
5	Kader Dost	Turkey	48:09	
6	Mariona García	Spain	48:49	
7	Kiriaki Filtisakoua	Greece	48:57	
8	Camille Moutard	France	49:06	PB
9	Olga Fiaska	Greece	49:28	
10	Mireia Urrutia	Spain	49:39	
11	Dóra Csörgö	Hungary	49:39	PB
12	Joana Pontes	Portugal	50:07	SB
13	Sara Buglisi	Italy	50:33	
14	Gemma Mora	Spain	50:38	
15	Austėja Kavaliauskaitė	Lithuania	50:40	SB
16	Daryna Kasyan	Ukraine	50:45	
17	Maelle Terrec	France	50:51	
18	Hana Burzalová	Slovakia	50:55	
19	Dana Marozava	Belarus	50:58	
20	Yevheniya Sychok	Ukraine	50:58	PB
21	Simona Bertini	Italy	51:11	
22	Alesia Beliahova	Belarus	51:28	
23	Niamh O'Connor	Ireland	52:08	
24	Adrija Meškauskaitė	Lithuania	52:33	PB
25	Camilla Gatti	Italy	52:36	
26	Alina Tkach	Ukraine	53:10	
27	Toma Dailidonyté	Lithuania	53:31	PB
28	Eva Čanadi	Slovenia	55:05	NR
29	Eli Pevec	Croatia	56:24	
30	Alla Šubina	Estonia	57:46	PB
	Josephine Alisa Grandi	Germany	DNF	

Team race
Place	Country	Points
1st place, gold medalist(s)	Turkey	3 pts
2nd place, silver medalist(s)	France	11 pts
3rd place, bronze medalist(s)	Spain	16 pts
4	Greece	16 pts
5	Estonia	34 pts
6	Italy	34 pts
7	Ukraine	36 pts
8	Lithuania	39 pts
9	Belarus	41 pts

== Participation ==
256 athletes from 29 countries registered for competition of which 241 eventually started.

- Austria (1)
- Authorised Neutral Athletes (3)
- Belarus (14)
- Croatia (3)
- Czech Republic (3)
- Estonia (8)
- Finland (3)
- France (20)
- Germany (15)
- Great Britain (8)
- Greece (8)
- Hungary (11)
- Ireland (7)
- Italy (22)
- Latvia (5)
- Lithuania (13)
- Netherlands (1)
- Norway (1)
- Poland (13)
- Portugal (9)
- Romania (5)
- Serbia (1)
- Slovakia (8)
- Slovenia (1)
- Spain (22)
- Sweden (2)
- Switzerland (1)
- Turkey (11)
- Ukraine (22)
