= 2025 European Race Walking Team Championships =

- Organisers: European Athletics
- Edition: 16th (3rd with this name)
- Date: 18 May
- Host city: Poděbrady, Czech Republic
- Events: 6
- Official website: https://www.podebrady-walking.cz/en/

The 2025 European Race Walking Team Championships took place on 18 May 2025. The races were held on a 1 km lap around the city park of Poděbrady, Czech Republic. It was the third edition to be held under the new name of European Race Walking Team Championships (from 2021 on).

== Medallists ==
Event	Gold		Silver		Bronze	
Individual
Men's 20 km	Paul McGrath; Spain	1:18:05	Francesco Fortunato; Italy	1:18:16	Gabriel Bordier; France	1:18:23
Men's 35 km	Massimo Stano; Italy	2:20:43; WR	Christopher Linke; Germany	2:23:21; NR	Miguel Ángel López; Spain	2:23:48; NR
Men's 10 km Junior (U20)	Giuseppe Disabato; Italy	39:28; NU20R	Joan Querol; Spain	40:58	Alessio Coppola; Italy	41:09
Women's 20 km	Lyudmyla Olyanovska; Ukraine	1:27:56	Clemence Beretta; France	1:28:05; NR	Pauline Stey; France	1:28:18
Women's 35 km	María Pérez; Spain	2:38:59	Antonella Palmisano; Italy	2:39:35; NR	Nicole Colombi; Italy	2:41:47
Women's 10 km Junior (U20)	Sofia Santacreu; Spain	43:57; NU20R	Chloe Le Roch; France	44:02; NR	Serena Di Fabio; Italy	44:08; NU20R
Team
Men's 20 km	Spain	16	Italy	16	Hungary	50
Men's 35 km	Italy	14	Spain	18	Germany	31
Men's 10 km Junior (U20)	Italy	4	Spain	7	Ukraine	17
Women's 20 km	France	15	Spain	17	Ukraine	24
Women's 35 km	Italy	10	Spain	18	Not awwarded	
Women's 10 km Junior (U20)	Spain	6	France	9	Italy	12

== Race results ==
=== Women's 20 km ===
Individual race

Rank	Athlete	Country	Time	Notes
1st place, gold medalist(s)	Lyudmila Olyanovska	Ukraine	1:27:56	SB
2nd place, silver medalist(s)	Clémence Beretta	France	1:28:05	NR
3rd place, bronze medalist(s)	Pauline Stey	France	1:28:18	PB
4	Antia Chamosa	Spain	1:29:11	
5	Katarzyna Zdziebło	Poland	1:29:19	SB
6	Paula Juarez	Spain	1:29:24	PB
7	Lidia Sanchez-Puebla	Spain	1:29:47	PB
8	Alexandrina Mihai	Italy	1:31:02	
9	Mariia Sakharuk	Ukraine	1:31:29	
10	Ana Delahaie	France	1:31:39	PB
11	Hana Burzalová	Slovakia	1:31:48	PB
12	Jekaterina Mirotvortseva	Estonia	1:31:52	NR
13	Giulia Gabriele	Italy	1:32:01	PB
14	Olena Sobchuk	Ukraine	1:32:05	SB
15	Camille Moutard	France	1:32:53	
16	Sofia Fiorini	Italy	1:33:19	PB
17	Vitória Oliveira	Portugal	1:34:13	
18	Valeriya Sholomitska	Ukraine	1:34:35	PB
19	Lucia Redondo	Spain	1:34:37	
20	Austeja Kavaliauskaite	Lithuania	1:35:53	
21	Kader Dost	Turkey	1:35:59	
22	Emine Ceylan	Turkey	1:36:00	PB
23	Michelle Cantò	Italy	1:36:45	
24	Tülin Ek	Turkey	1:37:01	PB
25	Ema Klimentová	Czech Republic	1:38:00	PB
26	Magdalena Żelazna	Poland	1:38:37	
27	Barbara Oláh	Hungary	1:39:24	SB
28	Fride Moller Flatin	Norway	1:41:59	PB
29	Kate Veale	Ireland	1:46:17	
30	Dóra Csörgő	Hungary	1:48:17	
31	Aisling Lane	Ireland	1:52:48	
	Tiziana Spiller	Hungary	DNF	
	Enni Nurmi	Finland	DNF	
	Meryem Bekmez	Turkey	DNF	

Team race

Rank	Country	Points
1st place, gold medalist(s)	Spain	6
2nd place, silver medalist(s)	France	9
3rd place, bronze medalist(s)	Italy	12
4	Turkey	29
5	Portugal	33
6	Ukraine	33
7	Poland	35
8	Hungary	44
9	Slovakia	46

=== Men's 20 km ===
Individual race

Rank	Athlete	Country	Time	Notes
1st place, gold medalist(s)	Paul McGrath	Spain	1:18:05	CR
2nd place, silver medalist(s)	Francesco Fortunato	Italy	1:18:16	PB
3rd place, bronze medalist(s)	Gabriel Bordier	France	1:18:23	PB
4	Andrea Cosi	Italy	1:18:43	PB
5	Mukola Rushchak	Ukraine	1:18:50	PB
6	Álvaro López	Spain	1:19:38	PB
7	Perseus Karlström	Sweden	1:19:48	
8	Leo Köpp	Germany	1:20:34	PB
9	Iván López	Spain	1:20:38	SB
10	Michele Antonelli	Italy	1:20:43	PB
11	David Kenny	Ireland	1:20:54	SB
12	Nicola Lomuscio	Italy	1:21:03	PB
13	Máté Helebrandt	Hungary	1:21:21	SB
14	Bence Venyercsán	Hungary	1:21:21	PB
15	Jerry Jokinen	Finland	1:21:37	PB
16	Mazlum Demir	Turkey	1:21:49	
17	José Manuel Pérez	Spain	1:22:23	
18	Veli-Matti Partanen	Finland	1:22:52	
19	Joni Hava	Finland	1:23:37	PB
20	Alexandros Papamichail	Greece	1:23:54	SB
21	Michal Morvay	Slovakia	1:23:57	PB
22	Salih Korkmaz	Turkey	1:24:18	
23	Norbert Tóth	Hungary	1:24:25	SB
24	Mateusz Nowak	Poland	1:25:16	PB
25	Frederick Weigel	Germany	1:25:21	
26	Adam Zajíček	Czech Republic	1:25:37	SB
27	Hayrettin Yıldız	Turkey	1:26:40	
28	Maryan Zakalnytskyy	Ukraine	1:26:49	
29	Arkadiusz Schiedel	Poland	1:28:00	
30	Jonathan Ekberg	Finland	1:28:15	SB
31	Lukas Lasevičius	Lithuania	1:34:48	
32	Kacper Łuc	Poland	1:34:56	
33	Tauras Jokūbas Grincevičius	Lithuania	1:35:24	
34	Thomas Hollegger	Austria	1:35:39	
35	Oleksii Polishchuk	Ukraine	1:37:05	
	Matthew Glennon	Ireland	DQ	
	Dávid Tokodi	Hungary	DQ	
	Mikail Dere	Turkey	DNF	

Team race

Rank	Country	Points
1st place, gold medalist(s)	Spain	16
2nd place, silver medalist(s)	Italy	16
3rd place, bronze medalist(s)	Hungary	50
4	Finland	52
5	Turkey	65
6	Ukraine	68
7	Poland	85

=== Women's 35 km ===
Individual race

Rank	Athlete	Country	Time	Notes
1st place, gold medalist(s)	María Pérez	Spain	2:38:59	WL
2nd place, silver medalist(s)	Antonella Palmisano	Italy	2:39:35	NR
3rd place, bronze medalist(s)	Nicole Colombi	Italy	2:41:47	PB
4	Hanna Shevchuk	Ukraine	2:42:41	NR
5	Federica Curiazzi	Italy	2:45:39	
6	Cristina Montesinos	Spain	2:46:18	
7	Viktória Madarász	Hungary	2:50:39	SB
8	Agnieszka Ellward	Poland	2:56:11	
9	Ines Mendes	Portugal	2:56:41	PB
10	Olga Fiaska	Greece	3:03:10	
11	Beatriz Cantero	Spain	3:04:04	
12	Efstathia Kourkoutsaki	Greece	3:17:14	
	Anett Torma	Hungary	DQ	
	Raquel González	Spain	DQ	
	Kader Güvenç	Turkey	DQ	
	Eleonora Anna Giorgi	Italy	DNF	
	Heta Veikkola	Finland	DNF	

Team race

Rank	Country	Points
1st place, gold medalist(s)	Italy	10
2nd place, silver medalist(s)	Spain	18

=== Men's 35 km ===
Individual race

Rank	Athlete	Country	Time	Notes
1st place, gold medalist(s)	Massimo Stano	Italy	2:20:43	WR
2nd place, silver medalist(s)	Christopher Linke	Germany	2:23:21	NR
3rd place, bronze medalist(s)	Miguel Ángel López	Spain	2:23:48	NR
4	Riccardo Orsoni	Italy	2:26:09	PB
5	Aurélien Quinion	France	2:26:24	SB
6	Dominik Černý	Slovakia	2:27:42	
7	Daniel Chamosa	Spain	2:27:56	PB
8	Manuel Bermúdez	Spain	2:28:43	PB
9	Matteo Giupponi	Italy	2:28:57	
10	Kévin Campion	France	2:29:05	PB
11	Maher Ben Hlima	Poland	2:29:51	
12	Serhii Svitlychnyi	Ukraine	2:30:00	NR
13	Ivan Banzeruk	Ukraine	2:30:22	PB
14	Johannes Frenzl	Germany	2:30:30	PB
15	Jonathan Hilbert	Germany	2:30:38	PB
16	Ihor Hlavan	Ukraine	2:31:26	PB
17	João Vieira	Portugal	2:31:41	NR
18	Vít Hlaváč	Czech Republic	2:31:44	NR
19	Marc Tur	Spain	2:32:00	
20	Teodorico Caporaso	Italy	2:33:03	
21	Jaromír Morávek	Czech Republic	2:35:19	PB
22	Cameron Corbishley	United Kingdom	2:36:06	
23	Martin Madeline-Degy	France	2:36:53	PB
24	Mattéo Duc	France	2:39:08	PB
25	Marius Iulian Cocioran	Romania	2:41:36	SB
26	Ozan Bayram	Turkey	2:42:27	NR
27	Joe Mooney	Ireland	2:43:04	SB
28	Narcis Stefan Mihăilă	Romania	2:43:40	SB
29	Brendan Boyce	Ireland	2:58:26	
30	Pavel Remus Rădoi	Romania	3:00:55	
31	Yehor Shelest	Ukraine	3:03:39	
32	Virgo Adusoo	Estonia	3:09:47	
	Tadas Šuškevičius	Lithuania	DQ	

Team race

Rank	Country	Points
1st place, gold medalist(s)	Italy	14
2nd place, silver medalist(s)	Spain	18
3rd place, bronze medalist(s)	Germany	31
4	France	39
5	Ukraine	41
6	Romania	86

=== Women's 10 km (U20) ===
Individual race

Rank	Athlete	Country	Time	Notes
1st place, gold medalist(s)	Sofia Santacreu	Spain	43:57	CR
2nd place, silver medalist(s)	Chloe Le Roch	France	44:02	PB
3rd place, bronze medalist(s)	Serena Di Fabio	Italy	44:08	PB
4	Mina Stanković	Serbia	44:21	
5	Claudia Ventura	Spain	44:44	PB
6	Alessia Cristina Pop	Romania	45:08	PB
7	Marine Merbitz	France	45:49	PB
8	Léna Auvray	France	45:53	PB
9	Elisa Marini	Italy	45:55	PB
10	Júlia Suárez Piza	Spain	47:39	
11	Isa Ferreira	Portugal	47:45	PB
12	Aleksandra Zembrowska	Poland	47:49	PB
13	Şeri˙fe Berra Güven	Turkey	48:04	PB
14	Theresia Emma Mohr	Austria	48:14	
15	Veronika Tkachuk	Ukraine	48:49	PB
16	Ipek Özkavlak	Turkey	48:52	PB
17	Francesca Gloria Buselli	Italy	49:06	
18	Khrystyna Ponikarchyk	Ukraine	49:07	PB
19	Petra Kusá	Slovakia	49:10	PB
20	Alexandra Kovács	Hungary	49:48	
21	Feyza Sagdiç	Turkey	50:01	PB
22	Isabel Luís	Portugal	50:37	PB
23	Paulina Tomaszewska	Poland	50:43	
24	Sára Kata Alföldi	Hungary	51:34	
25	Nika Helene Illing	Germany	51:35	
26	Daryna Yushchenko	Ukraine	52:19	PB
27	Tamara Indrišková	Slovakia	52:52	
28	Noémi Vancsó	Hungary	54:55	

Team race

Rank	Country	Points
1st place, gold medalist(s)	Spain	6
2nd place, silver medalist(s)	France	9
3rd place, bronze medalist(s)	Italy	12
4	Turkey	29
5	Portugal	33
6	Ukraine	33
7	Poland	35
8	Hungary	44
9	Slovakia	46

=== Men's 10 km (U20) ===
Individual race

Rank	Athlete	Country	Time	Notes
1st place, gold medalist(s)	Giuseppe Disabato	Italy	39:28	CR
2nd place, silver medalist(s)	Joan Querol Serrano	Spain	40:58	
3rd place, bronze medalist(s)	Alessio Coppola	Italy	41:09	PB
4	Nicolo' Vidal	Italy	41:22	PB
5	Pablo González	Spain	41:30	
6	Eduardo Camarate	Portugal	41:36	PB
7	Roman Horbachov	Ukraine	42:38	
8	Przemysław Jasiński	Poland	42:39	PB
9	Nick Joel Richardt	Germany	42:55	
10	Eduard Muravskyi	Ukraine	42:56	PB
11	Bastien Picart	France	43:03	
12	Panagiotis Saltis	Greece	43:14	PB
13	Séamus Clarke	Ireland	43:22	PB
14	Lukáš Rosenbaum	Slovakia	43:24	
15	Hampus Otterborg	Sweden	44:18	
16	Ernest Przestrzelski	Poland	44:23	PB
17	Azadullah Beğçe	Turkey	44:42	PB
18	Daniel Monfort	Spain	44:42	
19	Matthew Newell	Ireland	44:52	PB
20	Illia Tyshkevych	Ukraine	44:53	
21	Benjámin Bor	Hungary	45:00	
22	Jakub Mažgút	Slovakia	45:03	
23	David Ferreira	Portugal	45:47	
24	Péter Schwarcz	Hungary	46:45	
25	Kristoffer Randall	Norway	46:49	PB
26	Mateusz Margiel	Poland	47:09	
27	Serdar Yalçın	Turkey	47:12	
28	Dávid Ligeti	Hungary	47:17	PB
29	Liudas GrincevIčius	Lithuania	48:42	
30	Libertas Kulieša	Lithuania	49:17	
	Furkan Yaran	Turkey	DNF	

Team race

Rank	Country	Points
1st place, gold medalist(s)	Italy	4
2nd place, silver medalist(s)	Spain	7
3rd place, bronze medalist(s)	Ukraine	17
4	Poland	24
5	Portugal	29
6	Ireland	32
7	Slovakia	36
8	Turkey	44
9	Hungary	45
10	Lithuania	59

== Medal table ==
* Host nation (Czech Republic)

Rank	Nation	Gold	Silver	Bronze	Total
1	Italy	6	2	4	12
2	Spain	4	6	1	11
3	France	1	3	2	6
4	Ukraine	1	0	2	3
5	Germany	0	1	1	2
6	Hungary	0	0	1	1
Totals (6 entries)		12	12	11	35
