= 2026 European Athletics Championships – Women's half marathon race walk =

Women's half marathon race walk at the 2026 European Athletics Championships
- Venue: Alexander Stadium
- Location: Birmingham, United Kingdom
- Dates: 15 August 2026
- Winning time: 1:30:06 WR

Medalists
gold medal	María Pérez	Spain
silver medal	Alexandrina Mihai	Italy
bronze medal	Lyudmyla Olyanovska	Ukraine

The women's half marathon race walk at the 2026 European Athletics Championships took place in Birmingham, United Kingdom, on 15 August 2026.

== Background ==
Records before the 2026 European Athletics Championships
Record	Athlete (nation)	Time	Location	Date
World record	Jiang Yunyan (CHN)	1:31:39	Taicang, China	1 March 2026
World leading	Jiang Yunyan (CHN)	1:31:39	Taicang, China	1 March 2026
Championship record	New event			
European record	Antonella Palmisano (ITA)	1:32:21	Poděbrady, Czech Republic	8 May 2026
European leading	Antonella Palmisano (ITA)	1:32:21	Poděbrady, Czech Republic	8 May 2026

== Qualification ==
The qualification period was from 27 January 2025 to 26 July 2026. Athletes qualified by the entry standard of 1:36:20 m or faster in half marathon race walk, by the entry standard of 1:31:00 in 20 km walk, or by their position on the World Athletics Rankings for the event. The target number was 35 athletes. Eventually 28 athletes qualified.

Qualification standings per 31 July 2026
QP	CP	Country	Athlete	Status	Details
1	1	Italy	Antonella Palmisano	Qualified by Wild Card	Defending European Champion
2	1	Spain	María Pérez	Qualified by Entry Standard	1:32:51 - La Coruña (ESP) - 23 MAY 2026
3	2	Spain	Antía Chamosa	Qualified by Entry Standard	1:33:45 - Cieza (ESP) - 08 MAR 2026
4	2	Italy	Alexandrina Mihai	Qualified by Entry Standard	1:33:51 - La Coruña (ESP) - 23 MAY 2026
5	1	France	Pauline Stey	Qualified by Entry Standard	1:33:54 - Lens (FRA) - 08 MAR 2026
6	1	Ukraine	Lyudmila Olyanovska	Qualified by Entry Standard	1:34:18 - Pulko Str., Alytus (LTU) - 02 MAY 2026
7	3	Spain	Aldara Meilán	Qualified by Entry Standard	1:34:44 - Cieza (ESP) - 08 MAR 2026
8	3	Italy	Nicole Colombi	Qualified by Entry Standard	1:35:44 - St Anne's Park, Dublin (IRL) - 14 DEC 2025
9	2	France	Clémence Beretta	Qualified by Entry Standard	1:28:05 - Lázeňský Park, Poděbrady (CZE) - 18 MAY 2025
10	2	Ukraine	Mariia Sakharuk	Qualified by Entry Standard	1:29:13 - Alytus (LTU) - 12 JUN 2025
11	1	Turkey	Meryem Bekmez	Qualified by Entry Standard	1:30:00 - Lohrheidestadion, Wattenscheid, Bochum (GER) - 27 JUL 2025
12	3	France	Ana Delahaie	Qualified by World Rankings	22nd - 1144 points
13	1	Czech Republic	Ema Klimentová	Qualified by World Rankings	24th - 1137 points
14	1	Serbia	Mina Stanković	Qualified by World Rankings	27th - 1128 points
15	4	Italy	Giulia Gabriele	Qualified by World Rankings	28th - 1125 points
16	1	Greece	Christina Papadopoulou	Qualified by World Rankings	29th - 1120 points
17	1	Slovakia	Hana Černá	Qualified by World Rankings	30th - 1112 points
	5	Italy	Michelle Cantò	Qualified by World Rankings	31st - 1110 points
18	1	Portugal	Vitória Oliveira	Qualified by World Rankings	32nd - 1107 points
19	1	Hungary	Tiziana Spiller	Qualified by World Rankings	33rd - 1106 points
	6	Italy	Giada Traina	Qualified by World Rankings	34th - 1105 points
20	1	Austria	Theresia Emma Mohr	Qualified by World Rankings	38th - 1088 points
21	1	Lithuania	Austėja Kavaliauskaitė	Qualified by World Rankings	39th - 1085 points
22	1	Poland	Magdalena Żelazna	Qualified by World Rankings	40th - 1085 points
23	2	Turkey	Kader Dost	Qualified by World Rankings	44th - 1068 points
24	2	Czech Republic	Eliška Martínková	Qualified by World Rankings	45th - 1060 points
25	1	Finland	Heta Veikkola	Qualified by World Rankings	50th - 1033 points
26	3	Turkey	Emine Ceylan	Qualified by World Rankings	51st - 1029 points
27	3	Czech Republic	Alžběta Franklová	Qualified by World Rankings	56th - 1017 points
28	2	Hungary	Alexandra Kovács	Qualified by World Rankings	57th - 1015 points
29	2	Greece	Anastasia Antonopoulou	Qualified by World Rankings	58th - 1013 points
30	2	Finland	Enni Nurmi	Qualified by World Rankings	61st - 1007 points
31	3	Finland	Anniina Kivimäki	Qualified by World Rankings	70th - 975 points
32	1	Latvia	Modra Liepiņa	Qualified by World Rankings	83rd - 925 points

== Schedule ==
Date	Time	Round
15 August 2026	7:30	Final

All times are local times (UTC+1)

== Results ==
Key:	~ Red card for loss of contact	> Red card for bent knee

Place	Athlete	Nation	Time	Red cards	Notes
1st place, gold medalist(s)	María Pérez	Spain	1:30:06		WR
2nd place, silver medalist(s)	Alexandrina Mihai	Italy	1:31:04	~ ~	PB
3rd place, bronze medalist(s)	Lyudmyla Olyanovska	Ukraine	1:31:07	>	NR
4	Pauline Stey	France	1:31:12		PB
5	Antonella Palmisano	Italy	1:32:10		PB
6	Ana Delahaie	France	1:33:32		PB
7	Clémence Beretta	France	1:34:10	~	PB
8	Mariia Sakharuk	Ukraine	1:34:28		PB
9	Aldara Meilán	Spain	1:34:53		
10	Tiziana Spiller	Hungary	1:35:32		NR
11	Nicole Colombi	Italy	1:35:36	~ ~ >	PB
12	Antía Chamosa	Spain	1:35:57		
13	Vitória Oliveira	Portugal	1:36:10	> >	NR
14	Meryem Bekmez	Turkey	1:36:10		PB
15	Ema Klimentová	Czech Republic	1:36:29	~ ~	PB
16	Michelle Canto	Italy	1:37:59		
17	Mina Stanković	Serbia	1:38:10		
18	Eliška Martínková	Czech Republic	1:38:41		PB
19	Hana Burzalová	Slovakia	1:39:47		
20	Magdalena Żelazna	Poland	1:40:08		PB
21	Anastasia Antonopoulou	Greece	1:40:30		PB
22	Theresia Emma Mohr	Austria	1:40:59		
23	Alexandra Kovács	Hungary	1:41:45		PB
24	Kader Dost	Turkey	1:42:29	~	PB
25	Austėja Kavaliauskaitė	Lithuania	1:43:16		
26	Emine Ceylan	Turkey	1:43:25		PB
27	Enni Nurmi	Finland	1:44:02	~	PB
28	Alžběta Franklová	Czech Republic	1:44:47		SB
29	Anniina Kivimäki	Finland	1:48:02	~ >	
30	Modra Liepiņa	Latvia	1:48:58		NR
—	Heta Veikkola	Finland	DNF		
