= 2023 European Race Walking Team Championships =

- Organisers: EAA
- Edition: 15th (2nd with this name)
- Date: 21 May
- Host city: Poděbrady, Czech Republic
- Events: 6
- Participation: 210 athletes from 21 nations
- Official website: https://www.podebrady-walking.cz/en/

The 2023 European Race Walking Team Championships took place on 21 May 2023. The races were held on a 1 km lap around the city park of Poděbrady, Czech Republic. It was the second edition to be held under the new name of European Race Walking Team Championships (from 2021 on).

For the first time the men's 35 km distance was held and for the second time it also included women's 35 km racewalking event.

== Medallists ==
Event	Gold		Silver		Bronze	
Individual
Men's 20 km	Francesco Fortunato; Italy	1:18:59; EL, PB	Perseus Karlström; Sweden	1:19:27 =SB	Massimo Stano; Italy	1:20:07; SB
Men's 35 km	Álvaro Martín; Spain	2:25:35; NR, CR	Christopher Linke; Germany	2:27:05; NR	Miguel Ángel López; Spain	2:27:33 SB
Men's 10 km Junior (U20)	Diego Giampaolo; Italy	42:16; PB	Hayrettin Yıldız; Turkey	42:24	Pablo Rodríguez Rojas; Spain	42:37
Women's 20 km	Antigoni Drisbioti; Greece	1:29:17	Antonella Palmisano; Italy	1:29:19; SB	Ana Cabecinha; Portugal	1:29:35; SB
Women's 35 km	María Pérez; Spain	2:37:15; WR	Raquel González; Spain	2:45:42; SB	Cristina Montesinos; Spain	2:45:58 PB
Women's 10 km Junior (U20)	Giulia Gabriele; Italy	46:42 PB	Aldara Meilán; Spain	47:45	Ana Delahaie; France	48:04
Team
Men's 20 km	Italy	15	Spain	16	Germany	45
Men's 35 km	Spain	12	Italy	23	Germany	33
Men's 10 km Junior (U20)	Spain	8	Italy	9	Turkey	13
Women's 20 km	Italy	21	Ukraine	25	France	37
Women's 35 km	Spain	6	Italy	25	Ukraine	30
Women's 10 km Junior (U20)	Spain	7	Italy	8	France	20

== Race results ==
=== Men's 20 km ===
Individual race

Rank	Athlete	Country	Time	Notes
1st place, gold medalist(s)	Francesco Fortunato	Italy	1:18:59	EL
2nd place, silver medalist(s)	Perseus Karlström	Sweden	1:19:27	=SB
3rd place, bronze medalist(s)	Massimo Stano	Italy	1:20:07	SB
4	Alberto Amezcua	Spain	1:20:24	SB
5	Paul McGrath	Spain	1:21:15	EU23L, PB
6	Aku Partanen	Finland	1:21:26	PB
7	Diego García	Spain	1:21:42	SB
8	Nils Brembach	Germany	1:21:54	SB
9	Gabriel Bordier	France	1:22:00	
10	João Vieira	Portugal	1:22:08	SB
11	Andrea Cosi	Italy	1:22:48	
12	Salih Korkmaz	Turkey	1:23:12	SB
13	Leo Köpp	Germany	1:23:59	SB
14	Maryan Zakalnytskyy	Ukraine	1:24:27	SB
15	Serhii Svitlychnyi	Ukraine	1:24:28	SB
16	David Kenny	Ireland	1:24:31	SB
17	Mazlum Demir	Turkey	1:24:46	PB
18	Joni Hava	Finland	1:24:46	SB
19	Alexandros Papamichail	Greece	1:24:52	SB
20	Gianluca Picchiottino	Italy	1:25:47	
21	Dominik Černý	Slovakia	1:26:18	
22	Oisin Lane	Ireland	1:26:26	SB
23	Adam Zajíček	Czech Republic	1:26:37	PB
24	Karl Junghannß	Germany	1:26:53	
25	Arnis Rumbenieks	Latvia	1:26:57	SB
26	Aleksi Ojala	Finland	1:27:06	SB
27	Jaromír Morávek	Czech Republic	1:27:33	PB
28	Jerry Jokinen	Finland	1:27:35	SB
29	Brendan Boyce	Ireland	1:27:57	
30	Mykola Rushchak	Ukraine	1:28:52	
31	Raivo Saulgriezis	Latvia	1:28:59	
32	Abdulselam İmük	Turkey	1:29:11	
33	Artur Mastianica	Lithuania	1:30:15	SB
34	Johannes Frenzl	Germany	1:31:04	
35	Viktor Shumik	Ukraine	1:31:36	
36	Rui Coelho	Portugal	1:32:09	
37	Álvaro López	Spain	1:33:05	
38	Ignas Dumbliauskas	Lithuania	1:35:39	PB
39	Norbert Tóth	Hungary	1:39:17	
40	Dávid Józsvai	Hungary	1:41:31	SB
41	Imre Csontos	Hungary	1:42:01	
42	Deividas Balevičius	Lithuania	1:42:13	
	Marius Žiukas	Lithuania	DQ	
	Matthew Glennon	Ireland	DNF	
	Martin Madeline-Degy	France	DNF	
	Kévin Campion	France	DNF	
	Michal Morvay	Slovakia	DNF	
	Łukasz Niedziałek	Poland	DNF	

Team race

Rank	Country	Points
1st place, gold medalist(s)	Italy	15
2nd place, silver medalist(s)	Spain	16
3rd place, bronze medalist(s)	Germany	45
4	Finland	50
5	Ukraine	59
6	Turkey	61
7	Ireland	67
8	Lithuania	113
9	Hungary	120

=== Women's 20 km ===
Individual race

Rank	Athlete	Country	Time	Notes
1st place, gold medalist(s)	Antigoni Drisbioti	Greece	1:29:17	
2nd place, silver medalist(s)	Antonella Palmisano	Italy	1:29:19	SB
3rd place, bronze medalist(s)	Ana Cabecinha	Portugal	1:29:35	SB
4	Lyudmila Olyanovska	Ukraine	1:29:58	SB
5	Olena Sobchuk	Ukraine	1:30:48	SB
6	Clémence Beretta	France	1:31:14	
7	Antia Chamosa	Spain	1:31:24	PB
8	Valentina Trapletti	Italy	1:32:09	SB
9	Pauline Stey	France	1:32:21	PB
10	Saskia Feige	Germany	1:32:49	
11	Alexandrina Mihai	Italy	1:32:55	PB
12	Eliška Martínková	Czech Republic	1:33:02	SB
13	María Juárez	Spain	1:33:29	SB
14	Katarzyna Zdziebło	Poland	1:34:18	SB
15	Olga Chojecka	Poland	1:34:22	SB
16	Hanna Shevchuk	Ukraine	1:34:25	SB
17	Christina Papadopoulou	Greece	1:34:30	SB
18	Eleonora Anna Giorgi	Italy	1:34:34	SB
19	Vitória Oliveira	Portugal	1:34:41	
20	Carmen Escariz	Spain	1:35:42	
21	Meryem Bekmez	Turkey	1:35:48	
22	Camille Moutard	France	1:35:50	
23	Lucia Redondo	Spain	1:35:53	
24	Carolina Costa	Portugal	1:35:59	SB
25	Inês Mendes	Portugal	1:37:49	
26	Heather Warner	United Kingdom	1:38:13	
27	Kader Dost	Turkey	1:38:41	
28	Olga Fiaska	Greece	1:38:55	
29	Monika Vaiciukevičiuté	Lithuania	1:39:41	
30	Ema Hačundová	Slovakia	1:41:19	
31	Heta Veikkola	Finland	1:41:44	
32	Hana Burzalová	Slovakia	1:42:29	
33	Agnieszka Ellward	Poland	1:42:44	SB
34	Anna Zdziebło	Poland	1:42:57	
35	Barbara Oláh	Hungary	1:45:03	SB
36	Klaudia Žárska	Slovakia	1:46:56	
37	Venla-Nora Nirkkonen	Finland	1:47:07	PB
38	Tiziana Spiller	Hungary	1:50:54	
39	Petra Zahorán	Hungary	1:51:45	SB
40	Fride Moller Flatin	Norway	1:51:51	PB
41	Sofiia Krylovetska	Ukraine	1:52:13	
42	Sorana Tutu	Romania	1:56:06	
	Dóra Csörgő	Hungary	DNF	

Team race

Rank	Country	Points
1st place, gold medalist(s)	Italy	21
2nd place, silver medalist(s)	Ukraine	25
3rd place, bronze medalist(s)	France	37
4	Spain	40
5	Greece	46
6	Portugal	46
7	Poland	62
8	Slovakia	98
9	Hungary	112

=== Men's 35 km ===
Individual race

Rank	Athlete	Country	Time	Notes
1st place, gold medalist(s)	Álvaro Martín	Spain	2:25:35	CR, NR
2nd place, silver medalist(s)	Christopher Linke	Germany	2:27:05	NR
3rd place, bronze medalist(s)	Miguel Ángel López	Spain	2:27:33	SB
4	Aurélien Quinion	France	2:29:32	SB
5	Andrea Agrusti	Italy	2:30:16	PB
6	Riccardo Orsoni	Italy	2:30:38	PB
7	Carl Dohmann	Germany	2:31:16	SB
8	Marc Tur	Spain	2:32:06	
9	Ihor Hlavan	Ukraine	2:32:50	SB
10	Jakub Jelonek	Poland	2:34:21	PB
11	Artur Brzozowski	Poland	2:34:41	PB
12	Stefano Chiesa	Italy	2:34:46	
13	Ivan Banzeruk	Ukraine	2:34:52	SB
14	Valeriy Litanyuk	Ukraine	2:35:46	SB
15	Manuel Bermúdez	Spain	2:35:46	SB
16	Narcis Mihăilă	Romania	2:37:23	NR
17	Michele Antonelli	Italy	2:38:06	SB
18	Ioannis Kafkas	Greece	2:40:53	PB
19	Bence Venyercsán	Hungary	2:40:58	
20	Hugo Andrieu	France	2:41:33	PB
21	Anton Radko	Ukraine	2:42:02	
22	Marius Iulian Cocioran	Romania	2:42:47	SB
23	Mattéo Duc	France	2:43:05	PB
24	Nathaniel Seiler	Germany	2:44:06	
25	Rafał Sikora	Poland	2:46:26	SB
26	Tadas Šuškevičius	Lithuania	2:48:17	SB
27	Vít Hlaváč	Czech Republic	2:49:35	
28	Remi Rodriguez	France	2:52:32	
29	Pavel Remus Rădoi	Romania	2:54:10	
30	Ionuț Vasilică Pleșu	Romania	2:56:07	
31	Virgo Adusoo	Estonia	3:06:19	PB
	Dávid Tokodi	Hungary	DQ	
	Selman Ilhan	Turkey	DNF	

Team race

Rank	Country	Points
1st place, gold medalist(s)	Spain	12
2nd place, silver medalist(s)	Italy	23
3rd place, bronze medalist(s)	Germany	33
4	Ukraine	36
5	Poland	46
6	France	47
7	Romania	67

=== Women's 35 km ===
Individual race

Rank	Athlete	Country	Time	Notes
1st place, gold medalist(s)	María Pérez	Spain	2:37:15	WR
2nd place, silver medalist(s)	Raquel González	Spain	2:45:42	SB
3rd place, bronze medalist(s)	Cristina Montesinos	Spain	2:45:58	PB
4	Federica Curiazzi	Italy	2:49:39	PB
5	Nicole Colombi	Italy	2:52:13	PB
6	Ines Henriques	Portugal	2:53:14	SB
7	Vasylyna Sydorchuk	Ukraine	2:54:35	PB
8	Kiriaki Filtisakou	Greece	2:55:00	SB
9	Paula Juárez	Spain	2:55:14	PB
10	Alina Tsviliy	Ukraine	2:55:39	PB
11	Rita Récsei	Hungary	2:57:42	PB
12	Ana Rodean	Romania	2:59:18	NR
13	Valentyna Naiavko	Ukraine	2:59:45	SB
14	Bethan Davies	United Kingdom	3:00:13	SB
15	Bianca Maria Dittrich	Germany	3:00:55	PB
16	Sara Vitiello	Italy	3:01:18	
17	Mária Czaková	Slovakia	3:02:29	
18	Austėja Kavaliauskaitė	Lithuania	3:08:03	
19	Sofia Alikanioti	Greece	3:09:21	PB
20	Efstathia Kourkoutsaki	Greece	3:10:50	SB
	Anne van Andel	Netherlands	DQ	
	Anett Torma	Hungary	DQ	
	Tereza Ďurdiaková	Czech Republic	DNF	
	Lidia Barcella	Italy	DNF	

Team race

Rank	Country	Points
1st place, gold medalist(s)	Spain	6
2nd place, silver medalist(s)	Italy	25
3rd place, bronze medalist(s)	Ukraine	30
4	Greece	47

=== Men's 10 km (U20) ===
Individual race

Rank	Athlete	Country	Time	Notes
1st place, gold medalist(s)	Diego Giampaolo	Italy	42:16	
2nd place, silver medalist(s)	Hayrettin Yıldız	Turkey	42:24	
3rd place, bronze medalist(s)	Pablo Rodriguez Rojas	Spain	42:37	PB
4	Frederick Weigel	Germany	43:08	
5	Pablo Postigo	Spain	43:16	PB
6	Daniel Morilla	Spain	43:38	SB
7	Filip Krestianko	Slovakia	44:01	
8	Giuseppe Disabato	Italy	44:02	
9	Jassam Abu El Wafa	Germany	44:11	
10	Quentin Chenuet	France	45:14	
11	Andrea Di Carlo	Italy	45:16	
12	Harun Bilir	Turkey	45:17	
13	Tauras Jokubas Grincevičius	Lithuania	45:37	PB
14	Lukas Lasevičius	Lithuania	45:53	
15	Guilherme Rodrigues	Portugal	45:53	
16	Arvid Kockel	Germany	46:16	
17	Eduard Muravskyi	Ukraine	46:19	
18	Andrew Glennon	Ireland	46:29	PB
19	Ozan Bayram	Turkey	46:40	
20	Hugo Ellul	France	46:41	
21	Tomáš Mencel	Slovakia	46:54	
22	Jakub Bátovský	Slovakia	46:57	
23	Eduard Kravchenko	Ukraine	47:36	
24	Rom Horbachov	Ukraine	47:54	
25	Jake O´Brien	Ireland	48:59	SB
26	Benjámin Bor	Hungary	50:25	
27	Artur Djatšuk	Estonia	50:40	SB
28	Bernát Kocsis	Hungary	52:23	
29	Péter Schwarcz	Hungary	52:42	

Team race

Rank	Country	Points
1st place, gold medalist(s)	Spain	8
2nd place, silver medalist(s)	Italy	9
3rd place, bronze medalist(s)	Germany	13
4	Turkey	14
5	Lithuania	27
6	Slovakia	28
7	France	30
8	Ukraine	40
9	Ireland	43
10	Hungary	54

=== Women's 10 km (U20) ===
Individual race

Rank	Athlete	Country	Time	Notes
1st place, gold medalist(s)	Giulia Gabriele	Italy	46:42	PB
2nd place, silver medalist(s)	Aldara Meilán	Spain	47:45	
3rd place, bronze medalist(s)	Ana Delahaie	France	48:04	
4	Ema Klimentová	Czech Republic	48:15	PB
5	Griselda Serret	Spain	48:35	
6	Valeriya Sholomitska	Ukraine	48:39	SB
7	Giada Traina	Italy	48:40	
8	Sofia Fiorini	Italy	48:50	SB
9	Lena Sonntag	Germany	49:02	
10	Anastasia Antonopoulou	Greece	49:16	
11	Justé Perveneckaité	Lithuania	49:16	PB
12	Sofia Santacreu	Spain	49:34	
13	Alexandra Kovács	Hungary	50:03	
14	Magdalena Żelazna	Poland	50:11	
15	Emine Ceylan	Turkey	50:12	
16	Alžběta Franklová	Czech Republic	51:06	
17	Marine Merbitz	France	51:14	
18	Akvilé Orliukaité	Lithuania	51:23	
19	Kylie Garreis	Germany	51:33	
20	Izabela Krzyżanowska	Poland	51:42	
21	Tamara Indrišková	Slovakia	51:54	
22	Oksana Lukianovych	Ukraine	51:55	
23	Tülin Ek	Turkey	52:07	
24	Agathe Millé	France	52:13	
25	Aliisa Kiiski	Finland	52:28	
26	Tabea Kiefer	Germany	53:31	
27	Paulína Avenová	Slovakia	53:49	
28	Judit Erdős	Hungary	54:04	
29	Yuliia Lutska	Ukraine	54:09	
30	Elif Nur Özbey	Turkey	54:15	
31	Maria Ivanova	Estonia	55:17	PB
	Bernadett Bor	Hungary	DQ	
	Emilia Wiśniewska	Poland	DQ	

Team race

Rank	Country	Points
1st place, gold medalist(s)	Spain	7
2nd place, silver medalist(s)	Italy	8
3rd place, bronze medalist(s)	France	20
4	Czech Republic	20
5	Ukraine	28
6	Germany	28
7	Lithuania	29
8	Poland	34
9	Turkey	38
10	Hungary	41
11	Slovakia	48
