= 2024 European Athletics Championships – Women's 20 kilometres walk =

Women's 20 kilometres walk at the 2024 European Athletics Championships
- Venue: Stadio Olimpico
- Location: Rome
- Dates: 7 June (final)
- Competitors: 35 from 14 nations
- Winning time: 1:28:08

Medalists
gold medal	Antonella Palmisano	Italy
silver medal	Valentina Trapletti	Italy
bronze medal	Lyudmila Olyanovska	Ukraine

The women's 20 kilometres walk at the 2024 European Athletics Championships took place at the Stadio Olimpico on 7 June.

== Records ==
Standing records prior to the 2024 European Athletics Championships
World record	Yang Jiayu (CHN)	1:23:49	Huangshan, China	20 March 2021
European record	Vera Sokolova (RUS)	1:25:08	Sochi, Russia	26 February 2011
Championship record	María Pérez (ESP)	1:26:36	Berlin, Germany	11 August 2018
World Leading	Elvira Chepareva (RUS)	1:24:31	Sochi, Russia	27 February 2024
Europe Leading	Elvira Chepareva (RUS)	1:24:31	Sochi, Russia	27 February 2024

== Schedule ==
Date	Time	Round
7 June 2024	18:35	Final

All times are local times (UTC+2)

== Results ==
The start was at 18:35.

Rank	Name	Nationality	Time	Note
1st place, gold medalist(s)	Antonella Palmisano	Italy	1:28:08	
2nd place, silver medalist(s)	Valentina Trapletti	Italy	1:28:37	PB
3rd place, bronze medalist(s)	Lyudmyla Olyanovska	Ukraine	1:28:48	SB
4	Laura García-Caro	Spain	1:28:48	
5	Camille Moutard	France	1:28:55	PB
6	Cristina Montesinos	Spain	1:29:07	
7	Clémence Beretta	France	1:29:37	
8	Pauline Stey	France	1:29:54	
9	Raquel González	Spain	1:30:05	
10	Olena Sobchuk	Ukraine	1:31:47	SB
11	Eliška Martínková	Czech Republic	1:31:58	
12	Olga Chojecka	Poland	1:32:34	
13	Mariia Sakharuk	Ukraine	1:32:39	
14	Rita Récsei	Hungary	1:32:54	
15	Eleonora Anna Giorgi	Italy	1:33:29	
16	Antigoni Ntrismpioti	Greece	1:33:38	SB
17	Vitória Oliveira	Portugal	1:33:39	
18	Saskia Feige	Germany	1:33:57	SB
19	Panagiota Tsinopoulou	Greece	1:34:12	
20	Mária Katerinka Czaková	Slovakia	1:34:32	
21	Hana Burzalová	Slovakia	1:34:43	
22	Kyriaki Filtisakou	Greece	1:34:45	
23	Carolina Costa	Portugal	1:37:01	
24	Austėja Kavaliauskaitė	Lithuania	1:37:14	
25	Inês Mendes	Portugal	1:37:23	
26	Viktória Madarász	Hungary	1:37:43	
27	Ema Hačundová	Slovakia	1:39:18	
28	Maria Diana Lătărețu	Romania	1:39:22	
29	Brigita Virbalytė	Lithuania	1:40:14	
30	Tiziana Spiller	Hungary	1:43:55	
31	Monika Vaiciukevičiūtė	Lithuania	1:52:02	
	Meryem Bekmez	Turkey	DNF	
	Christina Papadopoulou	Greece	DQ	
	Katarzyna Zdziebło	Poland	DQ	
	Ayşe Tekdal	Turkey	DQ	
