= 2023 European Athletics U23 Championships – Women's 20 kilometres walk =

Women's 20 kilometres walk at the 2023 European Athletics U23 Championships
- Venue: Leppävaara Stadium
- Location: Espoo, Finland
- Dates: 12 July
- Competitors: 23 from 11 nations
- Winning time: 1:31:17

Medalists
gold medal	Pauline Stey	France
silver medal	Alexandrina Mihai	Italy
bronze medal	Camille Moutard	France

The women's 20 kilometres walk event at the 2023 European Athletics U23 Championships was held in Espoo, Finland, at Leppävaara Stadium on 12 July.

== Records ==
Prior to the competition, the records were as follows:

European U23 record	Natalya Fedoskina (RUS)	1:26:50	Dudince, Slovakia	19 May 2001
Championship U23 record	Anežka Drahotová (CZE)	1:27:25	Tallinn, Estonia	10 July 2015

== Results ==
Rank	Name	Nationality	Time	Notes
1st place, gold medalist(s)	Pauline Stey	France	1:31:17	NU23R
2nd place, silver medalist(s)	Alexandrina Mihai	Italy	1:32:32	PB
3rd place, bronze medalist(s)	Camille Moutard	France	1:35:40	
4	Ana Pulgarin	Spain	1:35:49	PB
5	Inês Mendes	Portugal	1:35:58	
6	Lucia Redondo	Spain	1:36:10	
7	Heta Veikkola	Finland	1:37:12	PB
8	Olga Fiaska	Greece	1:37:45	SB
9	Bruna Marques	Portugal	1:37:49	PB
10	Adriana Viveiros	Portugal	1:37:57	PB
11	Vittoria Di Dato	Italy	1:38:16	
12	Eva Rico	Spain	1:38:19	PB
13	Alžbeta Ragasová	Slovakia	1:38:59	PB
14	Elvina Carré	France	1:39:24	
15	Tiziana Spiller	Hungary	1:40:45	
16	Maria Diana Lataretu	Romania	1:45:40	
17	Petra Zahorán	Hungary	1:45:46	SB
18	Venla-Nora Nirkkonen	Finland	1:46:03	PB
19	Sorana Tutu	Romania	1:47:46	
20	Maria Antola	Finland	1:51:11	
	Evin Demir	Turkey	DNF	
	Eliška Martínková	Czech Republic	DQ	
	Karin Devaldová	Slovakia	DQ	
