= 2025 European Athletics U23 Championships – Women's 10,000 metres walk =

Women's 10,000 metres walk at the 2025 European Athletics U23 Championships
- Venue: Fana Stadion
- Location: Bergen, Norway
- Dates: 19 July
- Competitors: 23 from 13 nations
- Winning time: 43:49.55 PB

Medalists
| gold medal | Alexandrina Mihai | Italy |
| silver medal | Ana Delahaie | France |
| bronze medal | Giulia Gabriele | Italy |

The women's 10,000 metres walk event at the 2025 European Athletics U23 Championships was held in Bergen, Norway, at Fana Stadion on 19 July.

== Results ==
| Place | Athlete | Nation | Time | Notes |
|---|---|---|---|---|
| 1st place, gold medalist(s) | Alexandrina Mihai | Italy | 43:49.55 | PB |
| 2nd place, silver medalist(s) | Ana Delahaie | France | 44:07.59 | PB |
| 3rd place, bronze medalist(s) | Giulia Gabriele | Italy | 44:19.31 | |
| 4 | Sofia Fiorini | Italy | 44:57.05 | PB |
| 5 | Lucia Redondo | Spain | 45:37.40 | SB |
| 6 | Ema Klimentová | Czech Republic | 45:41.33 | PB |
| 7 | Tiziana Spiller | Hungary | 45:46.61 | NU23R |
| 8 | Griselda Serret | Spain | 45:53.92 | |
| 9 | Eva Rico | Spain | 46:30.53 | PB |
| 10 | Valeriya Sholomitska | Ukraine | 46:38.67 | |
| 11 | Anastasia Antonopoulou | Greece | 46:41.48 | PB |
| 12 | Liv Masson | France | 46:42.49 | PB |
| 13 | Alžběta Franklová | Czech Republic | 47:54.47 | PB |
| 14 | Selin Çadir | Turkey | 48:18.78 | PB |
| 15 | Magdalena Żelazna | Poland | 48:33.62 | |
| 16 | Heta Veikkola | Finland | 48:49.32 | PB |
| 17 | Lana Švarbić | Croatia | 48:53.16 | |
| 18 | Aliisa Kiiski | Finland | 49:24.77 | SB |
| 19 | Sorana Tutu | Romania | 51:42.22 | PB |
| 20 | Elena Andreea Focan | Romania | 53:01.93 | PB |
| — | Emine Ceylan | Turkey | DNF | |
| — | Anna Kokko | Finland | DNF | |
| — | Maren Bekkestad | Norway | DQ | TR 54.7.5 |
