= Kiriaki Filtisakou =

Greek racewalker

Kyriaki Filtisakou
Personal information
- Nationality: Greek
- Born: 14 August 2000 (age 25) Athens, Greece

Sport
- Sport: Athletics
- Event: Racewalking

Achievements and titles
- Personal bests: 20 km walk: 1:32:23 (2021); 35 km walk: 2:51:51 (2022); Indoors; 3000 m walk: 12:24.92 (2024)
Medal record
Women's athletics
Representing Greece
European Race Walking Team Championships
Silver medal – second place	2021 Poděbrady	35 km walk (team)
World Athletics Race Walking Team Championships
Silver medal – second place	2022 Muscat	20 km walk (team)

Kyriaki Filtisakou (born 14 August 2000) is a Greek racewalking athlete. At the age of 20 she qualified to represent Greece at the 2020 Summer Olympics in Tokyo 2021, competing in women's 20 kilometres walk, in which she finished in the 29th place.

Kyriaki Filtissakou in a doping test carried out in view of the Paris Olympics tested positive for a banned substance and was excluded from the Olympic Games a few days before the delegation departed.

== International competitions ==
Representing Greece
Year	Competition	Venue	Position	Event	Notes
2023	World Championships	Budapest, Hungary	37th	20 km Walk	1:37:51
2023	World Championships	Budapest, Hungary	26th	35 km Walk	3:02:16
2023	European Race Walking Team Championships	Poděbrady, Czech Republic	8th	35 km Walk	2:55:00
2023	Balkan Race Walking Championships	Antalya, Turkey	3rd	20 km Walk	1:34:08
2022	World Championships	Eugene, USA	22nd	20 km Walk	1:34:55 SB
2022	European Championships	München, Germany	DNF	20 km Walk	-
2022	World Athletics Teams Championships	Muscat, Oman	11th	20 km Walk	1:34:55
2021	Olympic Games	Tokyo, Japan	29th	20 km Walk	1:36:51
2021	European U23 Championships	Tallinn, Estonia	DNF	20 km Walk	-
2021	International Race Walking Festival	Alytus, Lithuania	5th	20 km Walk	1:33:06
2021	European Race Walking Team Championships	Poděbrady, Czech Republic	7th	35 km Walk	2:55:10
2021	Balkan Race Walking Championships	Antalya, Turkey	OC	20 km Walk	1:32:23 PB
2024	European Championships	Rome, Italy	22nd	20 km Walk	1.34:45
