= 2013 European Athletics U23 Championships – Women's 20 kilometres walk =

The Women's 20 kilometres walk event at the 2013 European Athletics U23 Championships was held in Tampere, Finland, on 10 July.

== Medalists ==
Gold	Lyudmyla Olyanovska; Ukraine
Silver	Antonella Palmisano; Italy
Bronze	Natalya Serezhkina; Russia

== Results ==
=== Final ===
10 July 2013

Rank	Name	Nationality	Time	Notes
DQ	Svetlana Vasilyeva	Russia	~~1:30:07~~	
1st place, gold medalist(s)	Lyudmyla Olyanovska	Ukraine	1:30:37	
2nd place, silver medalist(s)	Antonella Palmisano	Italy	1:30:59	PB
3rd place, bronze medalist(s)	Natalya Serezhkina	Russia	1:31:50	
4	Nina Ochotnikova	Russia	1:33:20	
5	Darya Balkunets	Belarus	1:34:52	
6	Federica Curiazzi	Italy	1:37:34	PB
7	Inès Pastorino	France	1:38:04	SB
8	Inna Kashyna	Ukraine	1:38:50	
9	Emilie Menuet	France	1:40:10	SB
10	Daniela Cardoso	Portugal	1:40:43	
11	Georgiana Enache	Romania	1:41:05	
12	Elena Poli	Italy	1:41:19	PB
13	Natalia Płomińska	Poland	1:43:51	
14	Elisa Neuvonen	Finland	1:45:42	PB
15	Nadia Cancela	Portugal	1:46:33	
16	Karolina Wierus	Poland	1:47:54	
17	Katarina Strmeňová	Slovakia	1:50:01	
18	Barbara Kovács	Hungary	1:52:53	
	Alexandra Aichimoaei	Romania	DQ	R 230.6a
	Sara Alonso	Spain	DQ	R 230.6a
	Mar Juárez	Spain	DQ	R 230.6a
	Émilie Tissot	France	DQ	R 230.6a

Intermediate times:
2 km: 9:37 Nina Ochotnikova Russia
4 km: 18:54 Natalya Serezhkina Russia
6 km: 28:02 Natalya Serezhkina Russia
8 km: 37:08 Natalya Serezhkina Russia
10 km: 46:05 Lyudmyla Olyanovska Ukraine
12 km: 55:01 Natalya Serezhkina Russia
14 km: 1:03:36 Svetlana Vasilyeva Russia
16 km: 1:12:21 Svetlana Vasilyeva Russia
18 km: 1:21:09 Svetlana Vasilyeva Russia

== Participation ==
According to an unofficial count, 23 athletes from 12 countries participated in the event.

- Belarus (1)
- Finland (1)
- France (3)
- Hungary (1)
- Italy (3)
- Poland (2)
- Portugal (2)
- Romania (2)
- Russia (3)
- Slovakia (1)
- Spain (2)
- Ukraine (2)
