= Alexandrina Mihai =

Italian racewalker (born 2003)

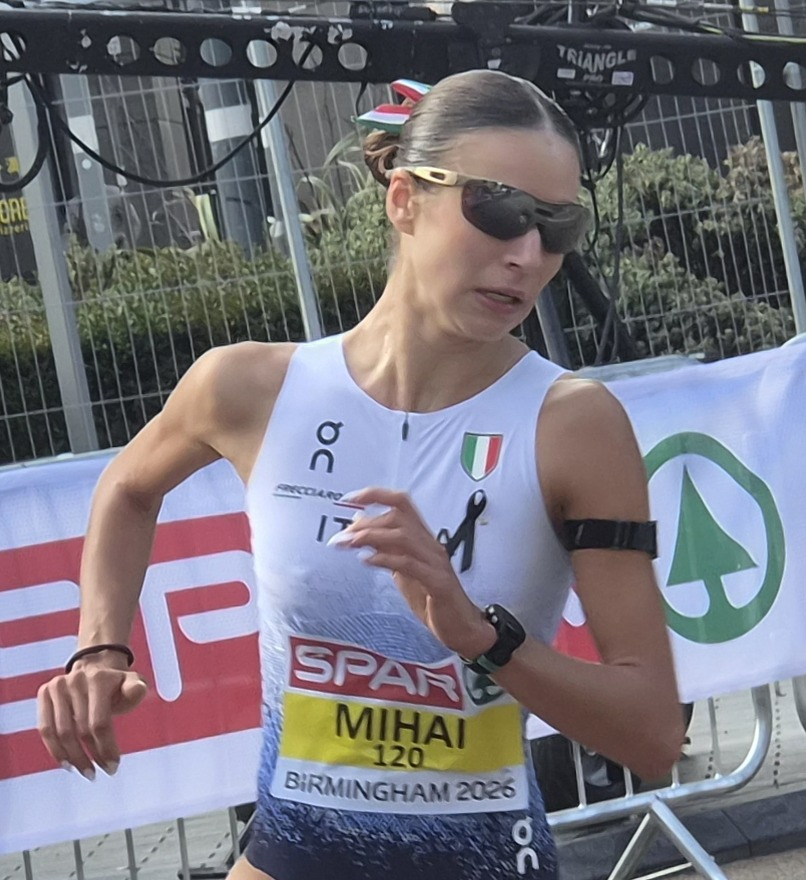
- Alexandrina Mihai at the 2026 European Championships

Personal information
- National team: Moldova (until 2022); Italy (from 2022)
- Born: 27 May 2003 (age 23) Chetrosu, Moldova
- Height: 1.74 m (5 ft 9 in)

Sport
- Sport: Athletics
- Event: Racewalking
- Club: Fiamme Oro
- Coached by: Pierluigi Padoan

Achievements and titles
- Personal bests: 10 km walk: 44:29 (2026); 20 km walk: 1:28:57 (2025); 35 km walk: 2:46:41 (2025)
Medal record
Event	1st	2nd	3rd
European Championships	0	1	0
European U23 Championships	1	1	0
European RW Team Championships	1	0	0
Total	2	2	0
European Championships
Silver medal – second place	2026 Birmingham	Half marathon walk

Alexandrina Mihai (born 27 May 2003) is a Moldovan-born Italian racewalker, who won a gold medal in the 10,000 m walk at the 2025 European Athletics U23 Championships.

== Biography ==
Born in Moldova, she moved to Italy at the age of five to join her parents in Soave, in the province of Verona. After practicing swimming for several years, in 2015 she began taking up athletics at San Bonifacio, where she was introduced to racewalking by coach Pierluigi Padoan.

In May 2023, she made her debut with the Italian senior national team at the European Team Racewalking Cup in Poděbrady, placing 11th in the individual 20 km race and winning the team gold medal alongside Antonella Palmisano and Valentina Trapletti. Later that year, she took part in the European U23 Championships in Espoo, winning the silver medal in the 20 km walk.

In 2025, she set the Italian U23 best performances in the 20 km (1:28:57) and 35 km (2:46:41) road walks. The same year, she won the gold medal in the 10,000 m track walk at the European U23 Championships in Bergen, setting an Italian U23 category record of 43:49.55.

== National records ==
- 20 km walk (under-23): 1:28:57 ( (Italy) Sant'Alessio Siculo, 30 March 2025)
- 35 km walk (under-23): 2:46:41 ( (Italy) Acquaviva delle Fonti, 26 January 2025)

== Achievements ==
Year	Competition	Venue	Position	Event	Performance	Notes
2023	European Team Championships	(Czech Republic) Poděbrady	11th	20 km	1:32:55	
2023	European Team Championships	(Czech Republic) Poděbrady	1st	20 km team	21 pts	
2023	European U23 Championships	(Finland) Espoo	2nd	20 km	1:32:32	
2023	World University Games	(China) Chengdu	5th	20 km	1:38:08	
2025	European U23 Championships	(Norway) Bergen	1st	10,000 m	43:49.55	NU23R
2025	World Championships	(Japan) Tokyo	15th	20 km	1:29:44	

== National titles ==
- Italian Athletics Championships
  - 10 km walk: 2026
  - 20 km walk: 2025
- Italian Indoor Athletics Championships
  - 3000 m walk: 2023

== See also ==
- Italy at the European Race Walking Cup
