= Massimo Stano =

Italian race walker

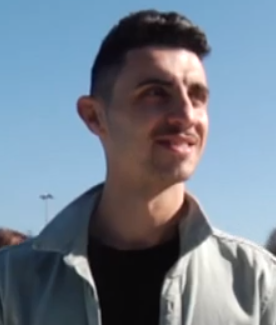
- Stano in 2021

Personal information
- Nickname: Jetsy
- National team: Italy (15 caps)
- Born: 27 February 1992 (age 34) Grumo Appula, Italy
- Height: 1.79 m (5 ft 10 in)
- Weight: 66 kg (146 lb)

Sport
- Country: Italy
- Sport: Athletics
- Event: Race walking
- Club: G.S. Fiamme Oro (2011-)

Achievements and titles
- Personal bests: 5000 m race walk short track: 19:22.62 (2015); 10,000 m race walk: 37:33.03 (2025) ER; 10 km walk: 39:06 (2023); 20 km walk: 1:17:26 (2024) NR; 35 km walk: 2:20:43 (2025) WR; Marathon race walk: 2:56:49 (2026)
Medal record
Event	1st	2nd	3rd
Olympic Games	1	0	0
World Championships	1	0	0
European Championships	1	0	0
World Team Championships	0	2	1
European Race Walking Team C'ships	2	1	1
European U23 Championships	0	1	0
Total	5	4	2
Olympic Games
Gold medal – first place	2020 Tokyo	20 km walk
World Championships
Gold medal – first place	2022 Eugene	35 km walk
European Championships
Gold medal – first place	2026 Birmingham	Marathon race walk
World Team Championships
Silver medal – second place	2018 Taicang	20 km walk (team)
Silver medal – second place	2026 Brasília	Marathon walk (team)
Bronze medal – third place	2018 Taicang	20 km walk
European Race Walking Team Championships
Gold medal – first place	2023 Poděbrady	20 km walk (team)
Gold medal – first place	2025 Poděbrady	35 km walk
Silver medal – second place	2021 Poděbrady	20 km walk (team)
Bronze medal – third place	2023 Poděbrady	20 km walk

Massimo Stano (born 27 February 1992) is an Italian race walker. He competed in the 20 kilometres walk event at the 2015 World Championships in Athletics in Beijing, China, finishing in the 19th position, and the same event at the 2020 Summer Olympics held in Tokyo, Japan, finishing in first place. On 24 July 2022, Stano won the 2022 World Athletics Championships with a championship record.

He is the world record holder of 35 km race walk.

== Career ==
Born in Grumo Appula, he grew up in Palo del Colle. He started with athletics at 11 years-old with the Fiamma Olimpia Palo, middle-distance running mainly, then starting at 14 years-old to practise race walking with his coach Giovanni Zaccheo. His club becomes for 4 years the Atletica Aden Exprivia Molfetta, the town where he trained. In 2011, he became a policeman as member of the Fiamme Oro. His first big athletics result comes from the 2013 European Athletics U23 Championships in Tampere where he finished initially fourth, but where he won first the bronze medal, then the silver after the doping disqualification of 2 Russians. To improve his results, he left Palo for Sesto San Giovanni taking a new coach, Alessandro Gandellini.

With too many injuries, he finally decided to change again of location and went to Castel Porziano, working and training in the barracks of the Fiamme Oro. His new coach becomes Patrizio Percesepe. Very quickly, he started having better results: he won the national championships with a personal best, he finished third at the 2018 IAAF World Race Walking Team Championships in Taicang, China and 4th at the European Championships in Berlin, finishing at only 1 second from the podium. In June 2019, he established the new national record of 1:17:45, but then, he finished only 14th at the 2019 World Championships in Doha. 2020 was also a difficult year with more injuries (periostitis) and with Covid pandemic he started again walking at the European Cup in Poděbrady on 16 May 2021 where he finished 8th.

In 2021 he won the gold medal in 20 km race walk at the 2020 Summer Olympics. In 2022 he won the 35 km race walk event 2022 World Athletics Championships in Eugene. In 2024 Summer Olympics in Paris he finished 4th at the 20 km walk event, and 6th at the Marathon race walk mixed relay event with Antonella Palmisano.

== Personal life ==
In 2016, Stano married Moroccan athlete Fatima Lotfi. They have a daughter, Sophie, and live together in Rome.

== Statistics ==
=== World records ===
- 35 km race walk: 2:20:43 Poděbrady, Czech Republic, 18 May 2025 – current holder

=== European records ===
- 35 km race walk: 2:20:43 Poděbrady, Czech Republic, 18 May 2025 – current holder
- 10,000 m race walk track: 37:33.03 Prato, Italy, 13 April 2025 (Note: The record was broken by Gabriel Bordier on 2 August 2025)

=== National records ===
- 20 km race walk: 1:17:45 A Coruña, Spain, 8 June 2019 – current holder
- 35 km race walk: 2:20:43 Poděbrady, Czech Republic, 18 May 2025 – current holder

=== Achievements ===
Individual

Year	Competition	Venue	Rank	Event	Time	Notes
2018	World Team Championships	Taicang, Taiwan	3rd	20 km race walk	1:21:33	
2021	Olympics Games	Tokyo, Japan	1st	20 km race walk	1:21:05	
2022	World Championships	Eugene, United States	1st	35 km race walk	2:23:14	CR ER
2023	European Team Championships	Poděbrady, Czech Republic	3rd	20 km race walk	1:20:07	
2025	European Team Championships	Poděbrady, Czech Republic	1st	35 km race walk	2:20:43	WR
2026	World Team Championships	Brasília, Brazil	5th	Marathon race walk	3:07:38	PB

=== National titles ===
Stano won five national championships at senior level.

- Italian Athletics Championships
  - 10,000 m race walk: 2025
  - 10 km walk: 2018
  - 20 km walk: 2015, 2018, 2022

== See also ==
- List of world records in athletics
- List of European records in athletics
- Italian records in athletics
- Italian all-time lists - 20 km walk
- Italy at the IAAF World Race Walking Cup
- Italy at the European Race Walking Cup
- Italy at the 2015 World Championships in Athletics
