= Francesco Fortunato =

Italian race walker (born 1994)

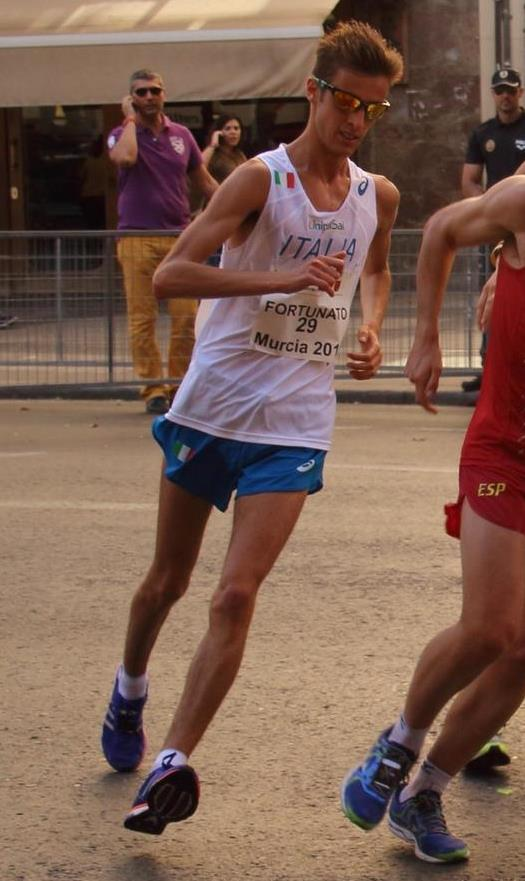
- Fortunato at 2015 European Race Walking Cup in Murcia

Personal information
- National team: Italy
- Born: 13 December 1994 (age 31) Andria, Italy
- Height: 1.78 m (5 ft 10 in)
- Weight: 52 kg (115 lb)

Sport
- Sport: Athletics
- Event: Race walking
- Club: G.S. Fiamme Gialle

Achievements and titles
- Personal bests: 5000 m walk (i): 17:54.48 (2026) WR; 10 km walk: 38.56 (2023); 20 km walk: 1:18:16 (2025); Half marathon walk: 1:23:00 (2026)
Medal record
Men's athletics
Representing Italy
World Team Championships
Gold medal – first place	2026 Brasília	Half marathon walk
Gold medal – first place	2024 Antalya	Marathon walk (mixed relay)
Silver medal – second place	2018 Taicang	20 km walk (team)
European Championships
Silver medal – second place	2026 Birmingham	Half marathon walk
Bronze medal – third place	2024 Rome	20 km walk
European Team Championships
Gold medal – first place	2023 Poděbrady	20 km walk
Gold medal – first place	2023 Poděbrady	20 km walk (team)
Silver medal – second place	2025 Poděbrady	20 km walk
Silver medal – second place	2021 Poděbrady	20 km walk (team)

Francesco Fortunato (born 13 December 1994) is an Italian race walker.

He is the world record holder of 5000 metres race walk indoor.

== Career ==
He won a bronze medal at the 2024 European Athletics Championships, sixteen national championships and has participated at three editions of the World Athletics Championships (2017, 2022, 2023). He also competed at the 2020 Summer Olympics in the 20 km walk.

In 2025 he improved on the 5000 metres race walk world record, with a time of 17:55.65, but his performance was not ratified as a world record due to the competition not meeting the level of judges required by World Athletics. However, in February 2026 he improved on the 5000 metres race walk world record, with a time of 17:54.48.

== Statistics ==
=== World Record ===
- 5000 metres race walk short track: 17:54.48 - Ancona, Italy, 28 February 2026

=== European Record ===
- Half marathon race walk: 1:23:00 - Poděbrady, Czech Republic, 8 May 2026

=== Achievements ===
Year	Competition	Venue	Position	Event	Time	Notes
2012	World Junior Championships	Barcelona, Spain	21st	10,000 m walk	43:13.27	
2013	European Junior Championships	Rieti, Italy	6th	10,000 m walk	42:23.99	
2014	Mediterranean U23 Championships	Aubagne, France	3rd	10,000 m walk	42:53.52	
2015	European U23 Championships	Tallinn, Estonia	11th	20 km walk	1:28:20	
2016	Mediterranean U23 Championships	Tunis, Tunisia	1st	10,000 m walk	39:46.25	
2017	World Championships	London, United Kingdom	28th	20 km walk	1:22:01	PB
2018	World Race Walking Cup	Taicang, China	2nd	20 km walk (team)	29 pts	
2018	European Championships	Berlin, Germany	16th	20 km walk	1:23:04	
2019	Universiade	Naples, Italy	5th	20 km walk	1:23:53	
2021	Olympic Games	Tokyo, Japan	15th	20 km walk	1:23:43	
2022	World Championships	Eugene, United States	15th	20 km walk	1:22:50	
2023	World Championships	Budapest, Hungary	11th	20 km walk	1:19:01	
2024	World Race Walking Cup	Antalya, Turkey	1st	Mixed relay (Note: Distance of the race is 42.195km: male 11.45km, female 10km, male 10km, female 10.745km)	2:56:45	PB (Note: He competed in team with Valentina Trapletti)
2024	European Championships	Rome, Italy	3rd	20 km walk	1:19:54	SB
2024	Olympic Games	Paris, France	20th	20 km walk	1:20:38	
2025	World Championships	Tokyo, Japan	16th	20 km walk	1:21:00	
2026	World Team Championships	Brasília, Brazil	1st	Half marathon walk	1:27:25	CR
2026	World Team Championships	Brasília, Brazil	5th	Half marathon walk (team)	62 pts	

=== National titles ===
He won 19 national championships at senior level.

- Italian Athletics Championships
  - 10,000 m walk track: 2020, 2021 (2)
  - 10 km walk: 2016, 2022, 2023, 2025 (4)
  - 20 km walk: 2017, 2019, 2023, 2024 (4)
- Italian Indoor Athletics Championships
  - 5000 m walk: 2016, 2017, 2018, 2019, 2020, 2023, 2024, 2025, 2026 (9)

== See also ==
- List of world records in athletics
- List of European records in athletics
- List of Italian records in athletics
- Italian team at the running events
- Italy at the World Athletics Race Walking Team Championships
- Italy at the European Race Walking Team Championships
