= Svetlana Vasilyeva =

Russian race walker

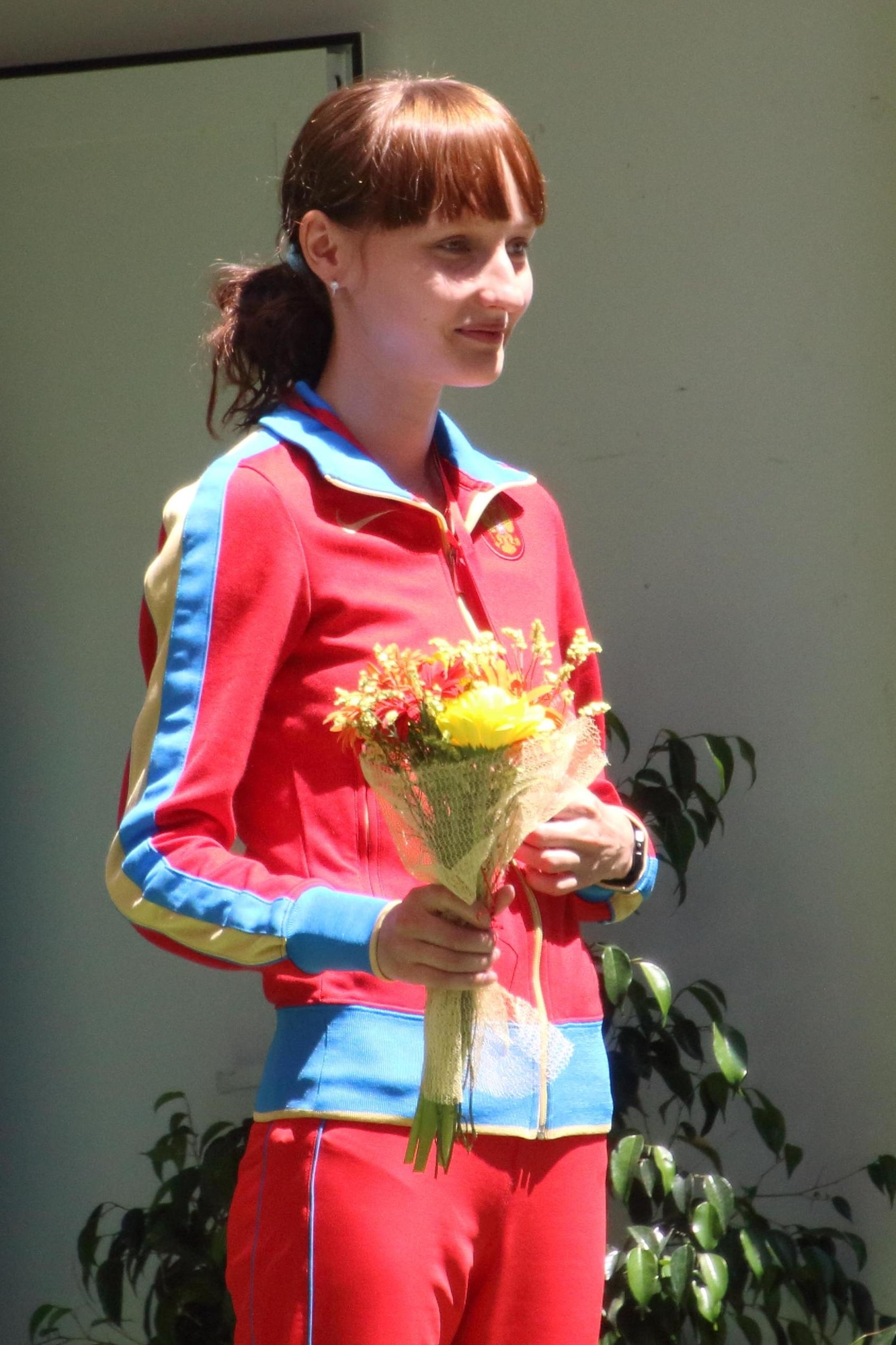
Vasilyeva in 2015

Svetlana Mikhailovna Vasilyeva (Russian: Светлана Михайловна Васильева; born 24 July 1992) is a Russian race walker. She won the 2011 Russian Winter Walking Championships in Sochi in the 10000 m track walk with a time of 42:43. The mark was not ratified as a world junior record as it was hand-timed. In August 2017, the All-Russia Athletic Federation announced that Vasilyeva had received a four year ban for doping violations, to be applied from 13 December 2016 onwards. She was also stripped of her previous results from 18 October 2011 until 14 July 2013 and 24 May until 12 December 2016.

== Competition record ==
Year	Competition	Venue	Position	Event	Notes
Representing Russia
2009	World Youth Championship	Bressanone, Italy	3rd	5000 m	23:00.15
2010	World Race Walking Cup (U20)	Chihuahua, Mexico	5th	10 km	48:35
2011	European Race Walking Cup (U20)	Olhão, Portugal	2nd	10 km	44:02
2011	European Race Walking Cup (U20)	Olhão, Portugal	1st	Team - 10 km Junior	3 pts
2011	European Junior Championships	Tallinn, Estonia	2nd	10,000m	44:52.98
2013	European U23 Championships	Tampere, Finland	DSQ (1st)	20 km	1:30:07
2015	European Race Walking Cup	Murcia, Spain	3rd	20 km	1:26:31
2015	European Race Walking Cup	Murcia, Spain	1st	Team - 20 km	9 pts
