= European U23 Championships =

European U23 Championships may refer to:

- European Athletics U23 Championships
- European U23 Cross Country Championships
