= Chetrosu =

Chetrosu may refer to:

- Chetrosu, a village in Gherghești Commune, Vaslui County, Romania
- Chetrosu, Anenii Noi, a commune in Anenii Noi district, Moldova
- Chetrosu, Drochia, a commune in Drochia district, Moldova
