= Damian Błocki =

Polish racewalker

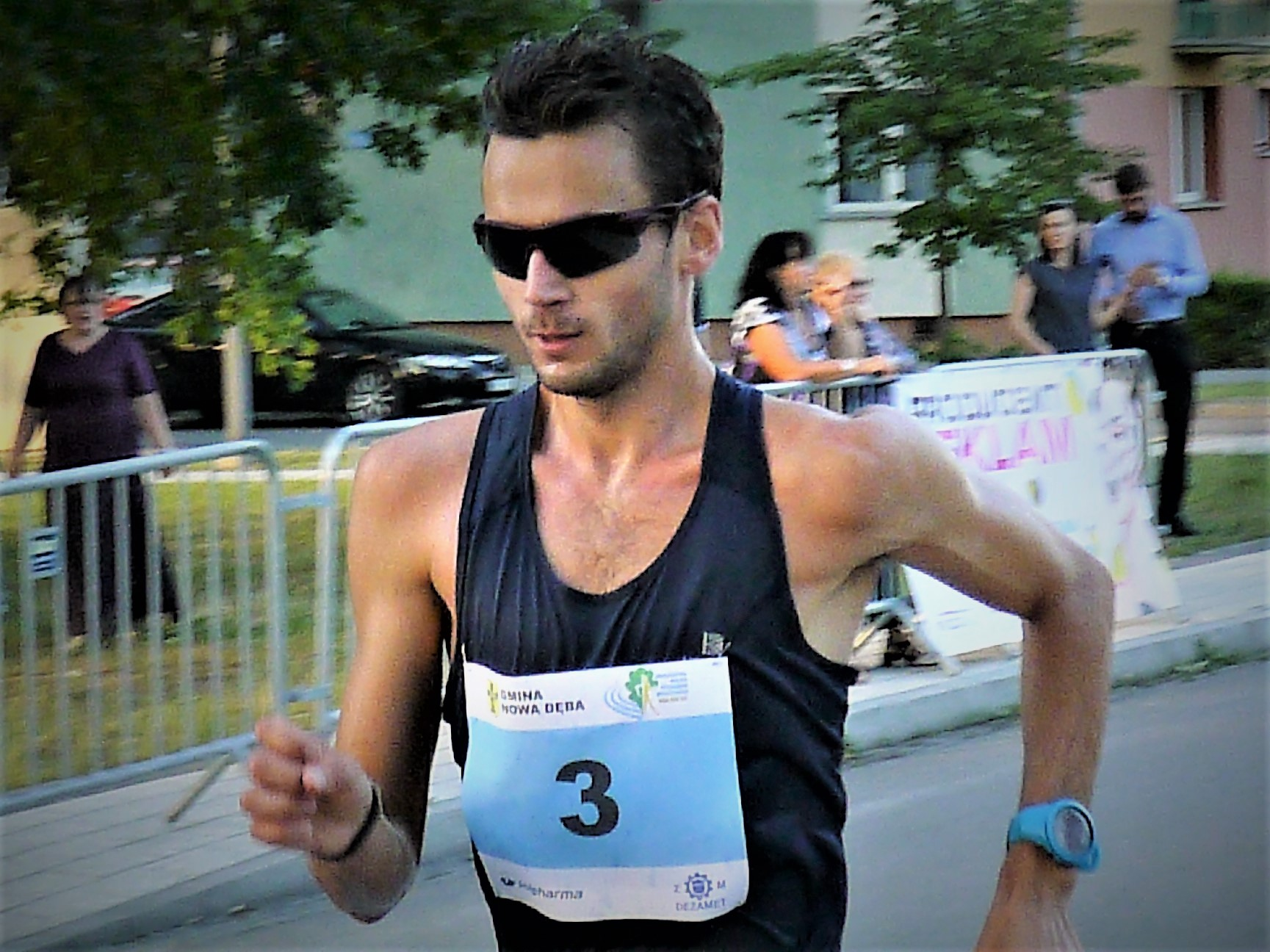
- Damian Błocki in 2017

Personal information
- Born: 28 April 1989 (age 36)

Sport
- Country: Poland
- Sport: Racewalking

Damian Błocki (born 28 April 1989) is a Polish racewalker. In 2017, he competed in the men's 20 kilometres walk at the 2017 World Championships in Athletics held in London, United Kingdom.
