= Miklós Srp =

Hungarian racewalker

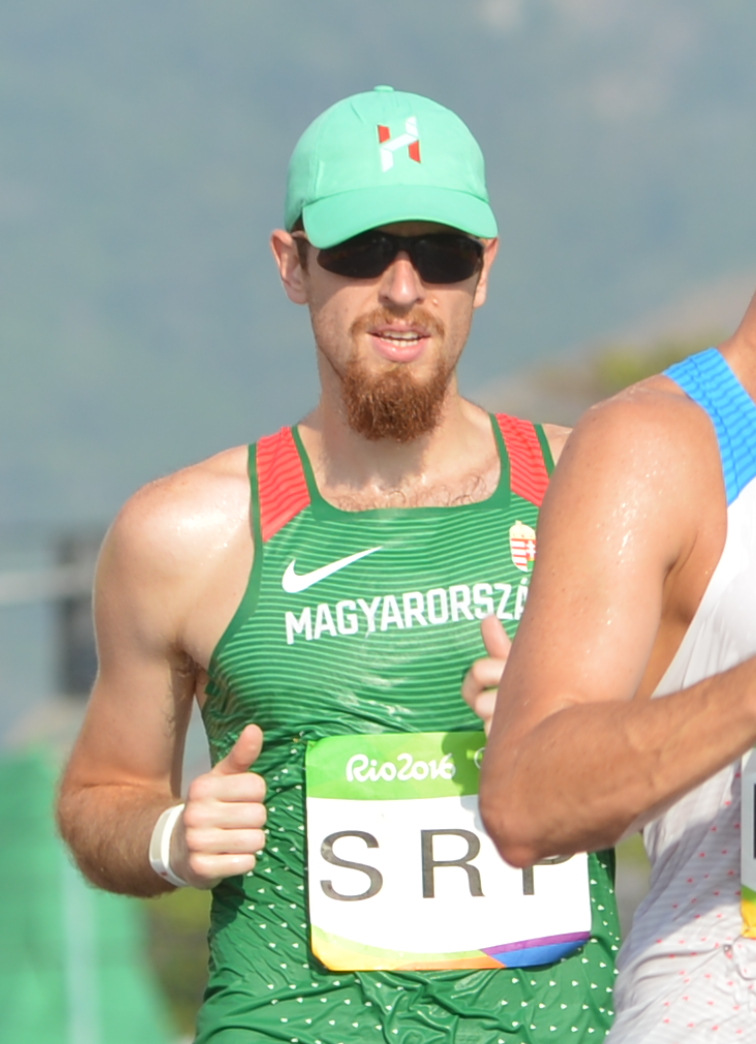
- Srp at the 2016 Olympics

Personal information
- Born: 6 March 1993 (age 33)
- Height: 200 cm (6 ft 7 in)
- Weight: 83 kg (183 lb)

Sport
- Sport: Athletics
- Event: Race walking

Achievements and titles
- Personal bests: 10 km – 44:02 (2011); 20 km – 1:28:17 (2013); 50 km – 3:57:06 (2016)

Miklós Srp (born 6 March 1993) is a Hungarian race walker. He competed in the 50 km event at the 2016 Summer Olympics but was disqualified during the race.
