= Lyudmyla Olyanovska =

Ukrainian race walker (b. 1993)

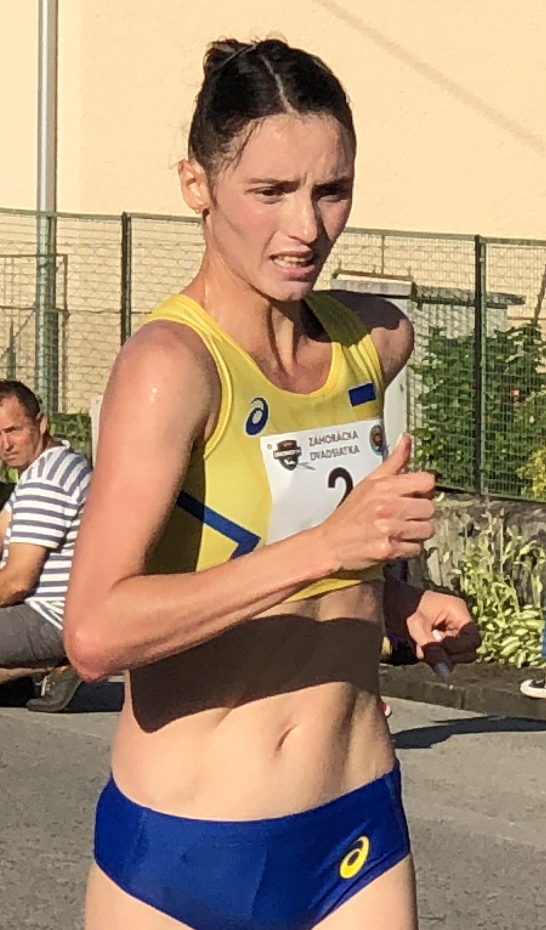
- Olyanovska in 2023

Medal record

Women's athletics

Representing Ukraine

World Championships
Bronze medal – third place	2015 Beijing	20 km walk

European Championships
Silver medal – second place	2014 Zürich	20 km walk
Bronze medal – third place	2024 Rome	20 km walk
Bronze medal – third place	2026 Birmingham	Half marathon race walk

European Race Walking Team Championships
Gold medal – first place	2025 Poděbrady	20 km walk

European U23 Championships
Gold medal – first place	2013 Tampere	20 km walk
Silver medal – second place	2015 Tallinn	20 km walk

Lyudmyla Oleksandrivna Olyanovska (Ukrainian: Людмила Олександрівна Оляновська; born 20 February 1993) is a Ukrainian race walker.

She is the world record holder of 5000 metres race walk indoor.

== Career ==
She won the bronze medal in the 20 kilometer racewalking event at the 2015 World Championships in Athletics in Beijing, China.

In 2014, she won the silver medal in the 20 kilometres racewalking event at the 2014 European Championships in Athletics.

In February 2017, she was disqualified for doping rules violation for four years since 30 November 2015 until 29 November 2019.

== National records ==
She holds three national records in racewalking:

Event	Record	Date	Meet	Place	Ref
5000 m walk (track)	20:15.71	4 June 2014		Kyiv, Ukraine	
15 km walk (road)	1:05:59+	3 May 2014	IAAF World Race Walking Cup	Taicang, China	
20 km walk (road)	1:27:09	17 May 2015	European Race Walking Cup	Murcia, Spain	
