= Nadzeya Darazhuk =

Belarusian racewalker (born 1990)

Personal information
- Born: 23 January 1990 (age 35)

Sport
- Country: Belarus
- Sport: Racewalking

Nadzeya Darazhuk (born 23 January 1990) is a Belarusian racewalker. In 2019, she competed in the women's 50 kilometres walk at the 2019 World Athletics Championships held in Doha, Qatar. She finished in 13th place.

In 2018, she finished in 11th place in the women's 50 kilometres walk at the 2018 European Athletics Championships held in Berlin, Germany.
