= Sofia Fiorini =

Italian race walker (born 2004)

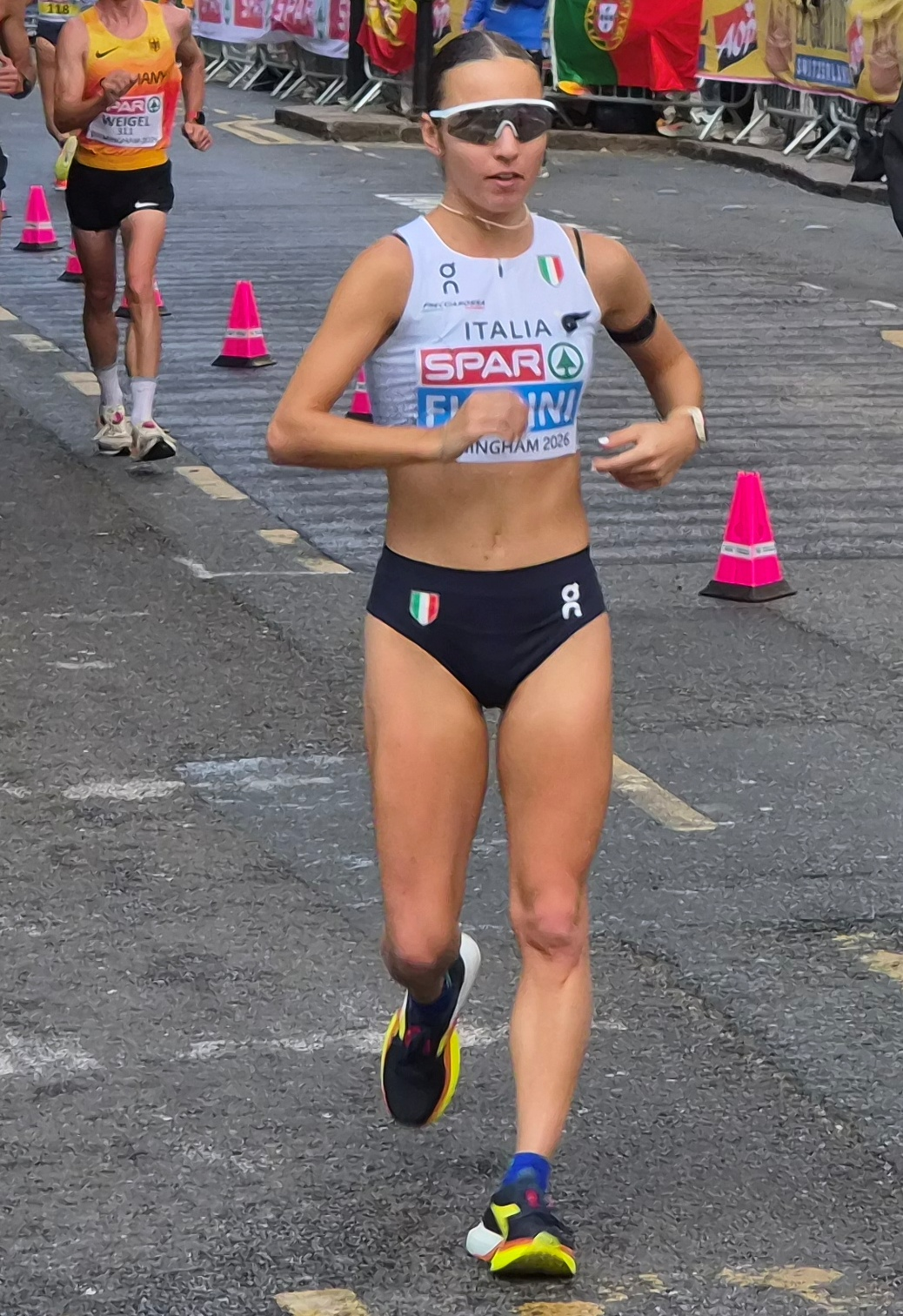

Personal information
- National team: Italy
- Born: 19 August 2004 (age 21) Bibbiena, Italy
- Height: 1.61 m (5 ft 3 in)
- Weight: 49 kg (108 lb)

Sport
- Sport: Athletics
- Event: Race walk
- Club: Atletica Libertas Unicusano Livorno
- Coached by: Alessandro Gandellini

Achievements and titles
- Personal bests: 20 km walk: 1:33:19 (2025); 35 km walk: 2:54:42 (2025); Half marathon walk: 1:32:36 (2026); Marathon walk: 3:15:11 (2026)
Medal record
Women's athletics
Representing Italy
European Championships
Gold medal – first place	2026 Birmingham	Marathon walk
World Team Championships
Silver medal – second place	2026 Brasília	Marathon walk
Silver medal – second place	2026 Brasília	Marathon walk (team)

Sofia Fiorini (born 19 August 2004) is an Italian race walker. She won the gold medal in the marathon walk at the 2026 European Championships, setting a world record in the process. Fiorini also won the silver medal at 2026 World Race Walking Team Championships and is a two-time two national champion at senior level.

== Achievements ==
Year	Competition	Venue	Rank	Event	Time	Notes
2025	European U23 Championships	Bergen, Norway	4th	10,000 m race walk	44:57.05	PB
2026	World Team Championships	Brasília, Brazil	2nd	Marathon race walk	3:25:42	PB

== National titles ==
She won two national championships at senior level.

- Italian Athletics Championships
  - Half marathon race walk: 2026
  - Marathon race walk: 2026

== See also ==
- Italian all-time lists - 35 km walk
- Italy at the World Athletics Race Walking Team Championships
- List of European under-23 records in athletics
