= Clémence Beretta =

French athlete (born 1997)

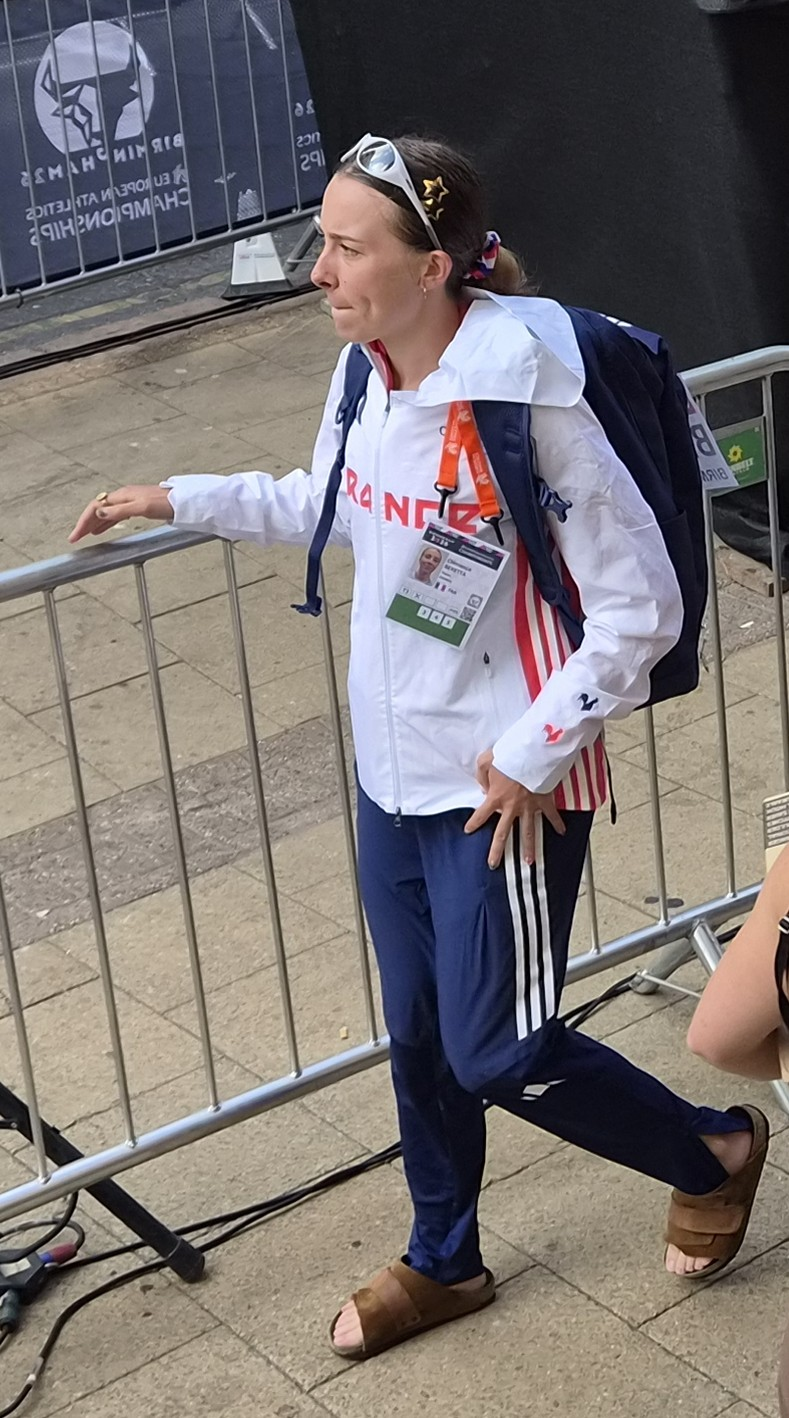
- Beretta at the 2026 European Championships

Personal information
- Born: 27 December 1997 (age 28) Remiremont, France
- Height: 163 cm (5 ft 4 in)
- Weight: 52 kg (115 lb)

Sport
- Country: France
- Sport: Athletics
- Event: Race walking
- Coached by: Pierre Beretta
Medal record
Women's athletics
Representing France
European Race Walking Team Championships
Gold medal – first place	2025 Poděbrady	20 km Team
Silver medal – second place	2025 Poděbrady	20 km walk
Bronze medal – third place	2023 Poděbrady	20 km Team

Clémence Beretta (born 27 December 1997) is a French race walker. She is a multiple-time French national record holder.

== Biography ==
From Remiremont, she was educated at Lycée Polyvalent André Malraux in the city and is a member of the Athlé Vosges Pays de Remiremont. Beretta had a sixth place finish at the 2022 European Athletics Championships in Munich in the women's 20 kilometres walk in August 2022, breaking the French record for the distance which has stood for 22 years.

Beretta had a sixth place finish individually, and was the first finishing Frenchwoman, with France winning the bronze medal in the team event at the 2023 European Race Walking Team Championships in the Czech Republic. Competing at the 2023 World Athletics Championships in Budapest, Hungary, she finished 16th in the 20km race. Beretta set a French record for the 10,000m race walk in January 2024 in Australia.

Beretta won the silver medal at the 2025 European Race Walking Team Championships in the individual women's 20 km walk, and the gold medal in the team event alongside Pauline Stey and Ana Delahaie. In doing so, she broke her own French record for the distance she had previously set in 2024.

On 15 August 2026, she placed seventh in the half marathon at the 2026 European Athletics Championships in Birmingham, England.
