= Nicole Colombi =

Italian racewalker (born 1995)

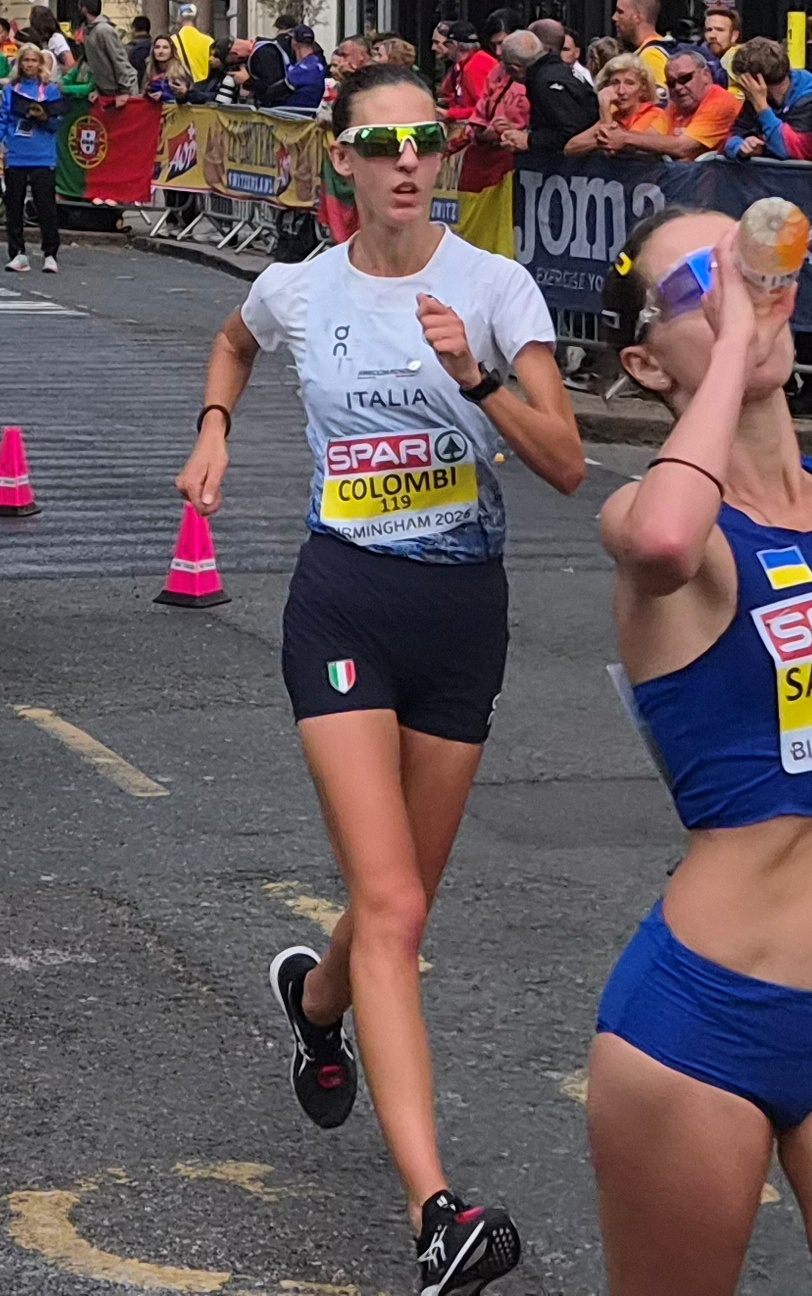

Personal information
- National team: Italy (5 caps)
- Born: 29 December 1995 (age 30) Seriate, Italy
- Height: 1.74 m (5 ft 9 in)
- Weight: 57 kg (126 lb)

Sport
- Country: Italy
- Sport: Athletics
- Event: Racewalking
- Club: Atletica Brescia 1950
- Coached by: Renato Cortinovis

Achievements and titles
- Personal bests: 20 km walk: 1:32:28 (2019); 50 km walk: 4:27:38 (2019)
Medal record
Event	1st	2nd	3rd
World Race Walking Cup	0	1	0
European Race Walking Cup	0	2	0
Total	0	3	0

Nicole Colombi (born 29 December 1995) is an Italian racewalker, who won a silver medal with the Italian team at the 2018 IAAF World Race Walking Team Championships.

== National records ==
- 50 km walk (road): 4:27:38 ( (Italy) Gioiosa Marea, 27 January 2019) - till 19 May 2019

== Achievements ==
Year	Competition	Venue	Position	Event	Performance	Notes
2017	European Cup	(Czech Republic) Poděbrady	26th	20 km	1:37:26	SB
2017	European Cup	(Czech Republic) Poděbrady	2nd	20 km team	34 pts	
2018	World Team Championships	(China) Taicang	42nd	20 km	1:34:33	SB
2018	World Team Championships	(China) Taicang	2nd	20 km team	38 pts	
2019	European Cup	(Lithuania) Alytus	13th	20 km	1:34:37	
2019	European Cup	(Lithuania) Alytus	2nd	20 km team	27 pts	

== National titles ==
- Italian Athletics Championships
  - 50 km walk: 2019
  - 10 km walk: 2021

== See also ==
- Italy at the IAAF World Race Walking Cup
- Italy at the European Race Walking Cup
