= Pauline Stey =

French athlete (born 2001)

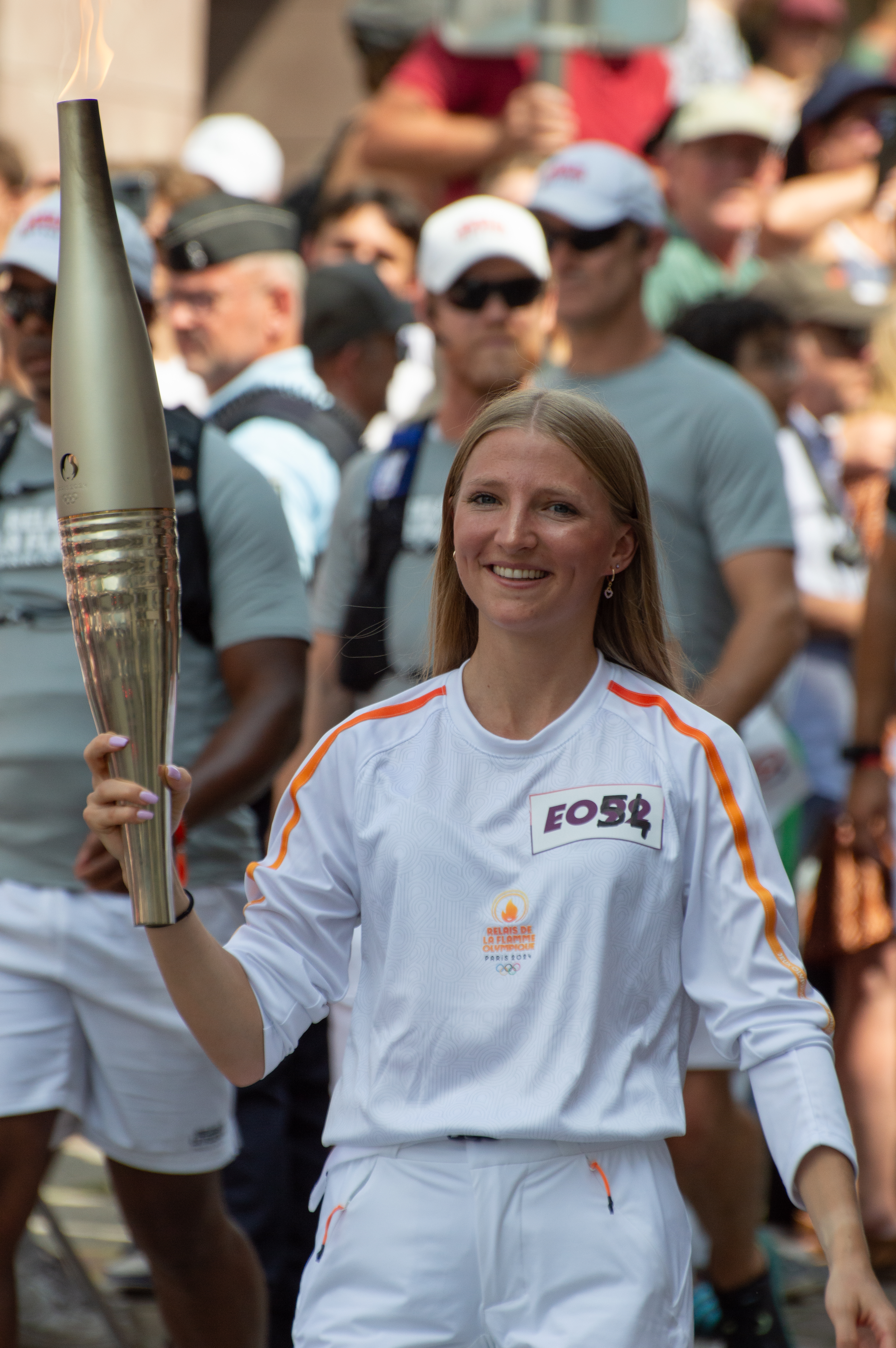
- Stey with the 2024 Olympic Torch

Personal information
- Born: 9 September 2001 (age 25) Saverne, France
- Height: 156 cm (5 ft 1 in)
- Weight: 42 kg (93 lb)

Sport
- Country: France
- Sport: Athletics
- Event: Race walking
- Club: Alsace Nord Athlétisme
- Coached by: Eddy Riva
Medal record
Women's athletics
Representing France
European Race Walking Team Championships
Gold medal – first place	2025 Poděbrady	20 km Team
Bronze medal – third place	2025 Poděbrady	20 km walk
Bronze medal – third place	2023 Poděbrady	20 km Team
European U23 Championships
Gold medal – first place	2023 Espoo	20km walk
Silver medal – second place	2021 Tallinn	20km walk
European Race Walking Cup
Bronze medal – third place	2019 Alytus	10 km race walk (U20)

Pauline Stey (born 9 September 2001) is a French race walker. She is the national record holder in the 3000 metres race walk.

== Biography ==
Stey grew up in the village of Waldolwisheim in Alsace. She became involved in athletics at the age of 11 years-old. She started at the local club Rohan Athlétisme Saverne and remains registered with Alsace Nord Athlétisme, and joined the Regional Centre for Sports and Physical Education in Strasbourg in 2019. That year, she placed third in the junior women's 10 km race at the 2019 European Race Walking Cup in Lithuania.

In 2021, she had a second-place finish at the French Indoor Athletics Championships in Miramas over 3000 metres, and followed that with a second-place finish at the 2021 French Championships in Angers over 10,000 metres. She won the silver medal in the 20-kilometer race walk at the 2021 European Athletics U23 Championships in Tallinn, Estonia.

In February 2023, Stey won the French 3000m race walk title at the French Indoor Race Walking Championships in Val-de-Reuil, setting a new French record time. That year, she also became the French senior champion in the 10km race walk and won the gold medal at the 2023 European Athletics U23 Championships in the 20km race walk in Espoo, Finland. Stey had a ninth place finish individually, and won the bronze medal in the team event for France at the 2023 European Race Walking Team Championships in the Czech Republic.

Stay won the bronze medal at the 2025 European Race Walking Team Championships in the individual women's 20 km walk, and the gold medal in the team event alongside Clemence Beretta and Ana Delahaie.

On 15 August 2026, Stey placed fourth in the half marathon at the 2026 European Athletics Championships in Birmingham, England.
