= Narcis Mihăilă =

Romanian racewalker

Personal information
- Born: 4 August 1987 (age 38)

Sport
- Country: Romania
- Sport: Racewalking

Narcis Ștefan Mihăilă (born August 4, 1987) is a Romanian racewalker. He placed 31st in the men's 50 kilometres walk at the 2016 Summer Olympics. In 2018, he competed in the men's 50 kilometres walk at the 2018 European Athletics Championships held in Berlin, Germany. He did not finish his race.
