= Lucía Redondo =

Spanish athlete (born 2003)

- Redondo at the 2026 European Championships

Personal information
- Full name: Lucía Redondo Ardid
- Nationality: Spanish
- Born: 3 August 2003 (age 23) Madrid, Spain

Sport
- Country: Spain
- Sport: Athletics
- Event: Race walking

Lucía Redondo Ardid (born 3 August 2003) is a Spanish race walker from Madrid.

== Biography ==
From Madrid, Redondo became the Spanish under-16 champion for the first time in 2017, despite competing against race walkers several years her senior. She proceeded to become the Spanish U18 and U20 Champion. In March 2022, she won the bronze medal alongside Eva Rico in the women's U20 10 km team walk at the 2022 World Athletics Race Walking Team Championships in Muscat, Oman.

In 2023, at the age of 19 years-old, she won the Spanish under-23 championships for the first time in both the 10 and 20 kilometre race walks. That year, she was called up to the senior national team for the first time for the 2023 European Race Walking Team Championships in Podebrady, Czech Republic.

In April 2024, Redondo recorded a personal best of 1:33:03, in the just second 20km race of her career, to place 21st at the 2024 World Athletics Race Walking Team Championships in Antalya, Turkey.

Redondo finished fourth in 44:37.40, a personal best, in the 10,000 metres race walk at the 2025 European Athletics U23 Championships in Bergen, Norway.

Redondo set a 1:34:22 personal best for a third place finish in the half marathon at the World Athletics Race Walking Tour Gold meeting in Poděbrady in May 2026. In July, she placed fourth in the 10,000 metres race walk at the Spanish Championships in Malaga. Redondo competed for Spain at the 2026 European Athletics Championships in Birmingham, England, in the marathon race walk, placing seventh overall.
