= Ana Delahaie =

Spanish athlete (born 2004)

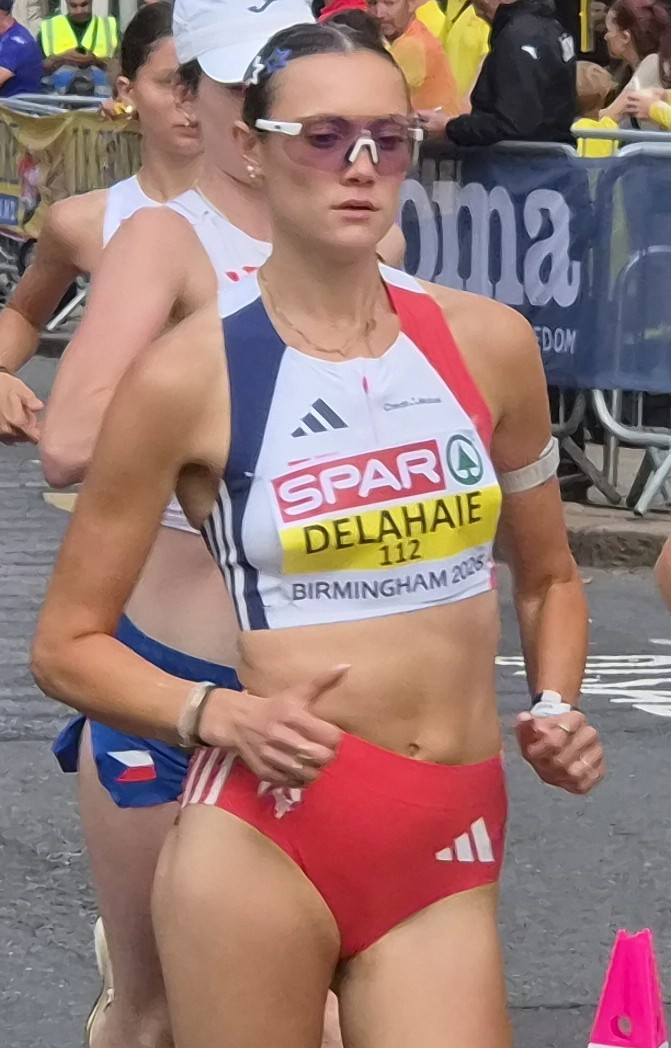
- 2026 European Championships

Personal information
- Born: 13 May 2004 (age 22)

Sport
- Sport: Athletics
- Event: Race Walking
Medal record
Women's athletics
Representing France
European Race Walking Team Championships
Gold medal – first place	2025 Poděbrady	20 km Team
European U23 Championships
Silver medal – second place	2025 Bergen	10,000 m walk
European U20 Championships
Bronze medal – third place	2023 Jerusalem	10,000 m walk

Ana Delahaie (born 13 May 2004) is a French race walker. The French senior national champion in 2024 in the 10,000 metres race walk, she won the silver medal over 10,000 metres at the 2025 European Athletics U23 Championships, and the bronze medalist at the 2023 European Athletics U20 Championships in the same distance.

== Biography ==
Originally from the Dordogne, she took part in basketball and rollerblading as well as participating in athletics as a member of Bergerac Athletic Club. She started race walking in her mid-teens and began to be coached by Christophe le Nocher who she stayed being coached by after joining Stade Bordelais and moving to study to Bordeaux and train at the Talence High-Performance Training Centre. She was runner-up in the French age-group championships in the 5000m race walk at the age of 17 years-old. She qualified for the World Junior Championships in Colombia in 2022 but missed the event due to a passport issue. In the 2022–23 season she won four junior French Championship titles; one in the 10,000 metres, one in the 10k on the road, one in the 3000 metres indoors and one in the 1 hour walk. She won two bronze medals at the 2023 European Race Walking Team Championships in Podebrady, Czech Republic, both individually and in the team event. In July, she won the individual bronze at the 2023 European Athletics U20 Championships in Jerusalem, Israel behind Sofia Santacreu of Spain and Italian Giula Gabriele.

In June 2024, she won the French championships over 10,000 metres in Angers with a new personal best of 45:41.15, improving her previous best by over a minute. On October 7, 2024, she competed at the French National Race Walking League Challenge and broke the French under-23 one-hour record. With her distance of 13,014 metres, she surpassed the previous best mark held by Camille Moutard (13,008 m). During the same race, she moved to second on the French all-time under-23 list in the 10,000 m behind Pauline Stey.

In 2025, she won the team gold medal in the 20,000 metres at the 2025 European Race Walking Team Championships in Poděbrady, and the individual silver medal over 10,000 metres at the 2025 European Athletics U23 Championships in Bergen, Norway.

On 15 August 2026, she placed sixth in the half marathon at the 2026 European Athletics Championships in Birmingham, England.
