= Kader Dost =

Turkish race walker

Personal information
- Born: 1 January 2000 (age 26) Adıyaman, Turkey

Sport
- Sport: Race walk

Kader Dost (born 1 January 2000) is a Turkish race walker specialising in the 5000 m, 10 km and 20 km racewalk.

Kader Dost was born in Adıyaman, Turkey on 1 January 2000.

At the 2019 European Race Walking Cup held in Alytus, Lithuania, she placed fifth in the U20 category of 10 km walk with a time of 48:09. In the 20 km individual race of the 2021 European Race Walking Team Championships, she ranked 26th with 1:36:14. In 2021, she took third place in the 20 km event at the International Race walk Championship in Sumy, Ukraine. She set her personal best time with 1:34:40. At the 20 km event of the 2022 European Athletics Championships in Munich, Germany, Dost finished in 19th place with 1:42:26.
