= Antonella Palmisano =

Italian racewalker (born 1991)

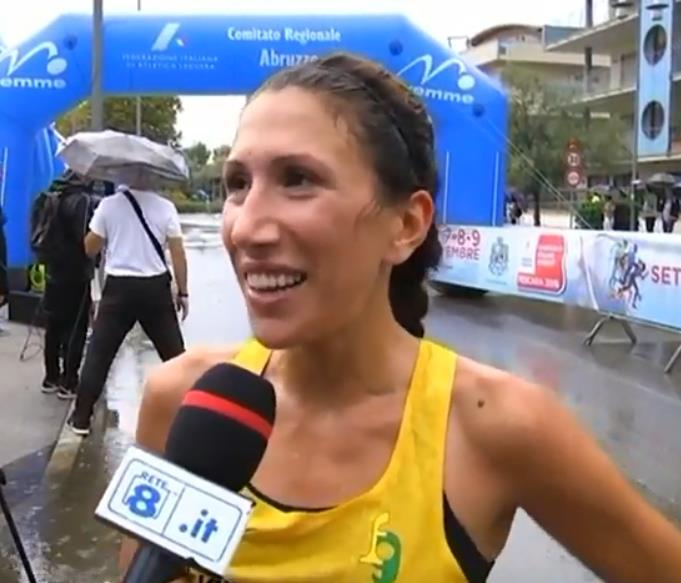
- Palmisano in 2018

Personal information
- Nationality: Italian
- Born: 6 August 1991 (age 34) Mottola, Italy
- Height: 1.66 m (5 ft 5 in)
- Weight: 49 kg (108 lb)

Sport
- Country: Italy
- Sport: Athletics
- Event: Racewalking
- Club: G.S. Fiamme Gialle

Achievements and titles
- Personal bests: 10000 m walk: 41:57.29 (2017); 20 km walk: 1:26:36 (2017)
Medal record
Women's athletics
Representing Italy
Event	1st	2nd	3rd
Olympic Games	1	0	0
World Championships	0	1	2
European Championships	1	1	0
World Race Walking Team C'ships	0	1	0
European Race Walking Team C'ships	3	2	1
Total	5	5	3
Olympic Games
Gold medal – first place	2020 Tokyo	20 km walk
World Championships
Silver medal – second place	2025 Tokyo	35 km walk
Bronze medal – third place	2017 London	20 km walk
Bronze medal – third place	2023 Budapest	20 km walk
European Championships
Gold medal – first place	2024 Rome	20 km walk
Silver medal – second place	2018 Berlin	20 km walk
European Race Walking Team Championships
Gold medal – first place	2017 Poděbrady	20 km walk
Gold medal – first place	2021 Poděbrady	20 km walk
Gold medal – first place	2023 Poděbrady	20 km walk
Silver medal – second place	2017 Poděbrady	20 km walk (team)
Silver medal – second place	2023 Poděbrady	20 km walk
Silver medal – second place	2025 Poděbrady	35 km walk
Bronze medal – third place	2021 Poděbrady	20 km walk (team)
European U23 Championships
Silver medal – second place	2011 Ostrava	20 km walk
Bronze medal – third place	2013 Tampere	20 km walk
European Junior Championships
Silver medal – second place	2009 Novi Sad	10000 m walk

Antonella Palmisano (born 6 August 1991) is an Italian racewalker, 3rd at 2017 World Championships, 4th at 2016 Summer Olympics and 5th at 2015 World Championships in 20 km race walk and 1st in the same event at the 2020 Summer Olympics. Also, she finished 2nd at 2025 World Athletics Championships held at Tokyo in the 35 km race walk.

== Biography ==
She competed in the Women's 20 kilometres walk event at the 2017 World Championships in Athletics in London and in the Women's 20 kilometres walk event at the 2015 World Championships in Athletics in Beijing, China.

== Achievements ==
Year	Competition	Venue	Position	Event	Time	Notes
2009	European Junior Championships	(Serbia) Novi Sad	2nd	10000 m walk	46:59.47	PB
2009	European Race Walking Cup	(France) Metz	3rd	10 km walk (junior)	48:48	SB
2010	World Race Walking Cup	(Mexico) Chihuahua	1st	10 km walk (junior)	47:52	
2011	European U23 Championships	(Czech Republic) Ostrava	2nd	20 km walk	1:36:26	
2013	European U23 Championships	(Finland) Tampere	3rd	20 km walk	1:30:59	PB
2013	World Championships	(Russia) Moscow	13th	20 km walk	1:30:50	PB
2014	European Championships	(Switzerland) Zürich	7th	20 km walk	1:28:43	
2015	World Championships	(China) Beijing	5th	20 km walk	1:29:34	
2016	Olympic Games	(Brazil) Rio de Janeiro	4th	20 km walk	1:29:03	
2017	European Race Walking Cup	(Czech Republic) Poděbrady	1st	20 km walk	1:27:57	
2017	World Championships	(United Kingdom) London	3rd	20 km walk	1:26:36	PB
2018	European Championships	(Germany) Berlin	2nd	20 km walk	1:27:30	SB
2021	European Race Walking Team Championships	(Czech Republic) Poděbrady	1st	20 km walk	1:27:42	
2021	European Race Walking Team Championships	(Czech Republic) Poděbrady	3rd	Team 20 km	23 pts	
2021	Olympic Games	(Japan) Tokyo	1st	20 km walk	1:29:12	
2023	World Championships	(Hungary) Budapest	3rd	20 km walk	1:27:26	SB
2024	European Championships	(Italy) Rome	1st	20 km walk	1:28:08	
2024	Olympic Games	(France) Paris	DNF	20 km walk	no time	
2024	Olympic Games	(France) Paris	6th	Mixed marathon walk relay	2:53:52	
2025	World Championships	(Japan) Tokyo	DNF	20 km walk	no time	
2025	World Championships	(Japan) Tokyo	2nd	35 km walk	2:42:24	

== National titles ==
She won 10 national championships at senior level.

- Italian Athletics Championships
  - 10 km walk road: 2014, 2018, 2020 (3)
  - 20 km walk road: 2014 (1)
- Italian Indoor Athletics Championships
  - 3000 metres walk: 2013, 2015, 2017, 2018, 2019, 2026 (6)

== See also ==
- Italian all-time lists - 20 km walk
- Italy at the World Athletics Race Walking Team Championships
- Italy at the European Race Walking Team Championships
- Italian team at the running events
