= Mariia Sakharuk =

Ukrainian racewalker (born 1995)

Personal information
- Nationality: Ukrainian
- Born: 14 October 1995 (age 30)

Sport
- Sport: Athletics
- Event: Racewalking

Mariia Sakharuk (née Filyuk) (born 14 October 1995) is a Ukrainian racewalking athlete. She competed in the women's 20 kilometres walk at the 2020 Summer Olympics.

Do not confuse this fast walker with Maria Dmytrivna Sakharuk (2008), who became the youngest Ukrainian woman to conquer Kilimanjaro in the summer of 2024.
