= Valentina Trapletti =

Italian racewalker (born 1985)

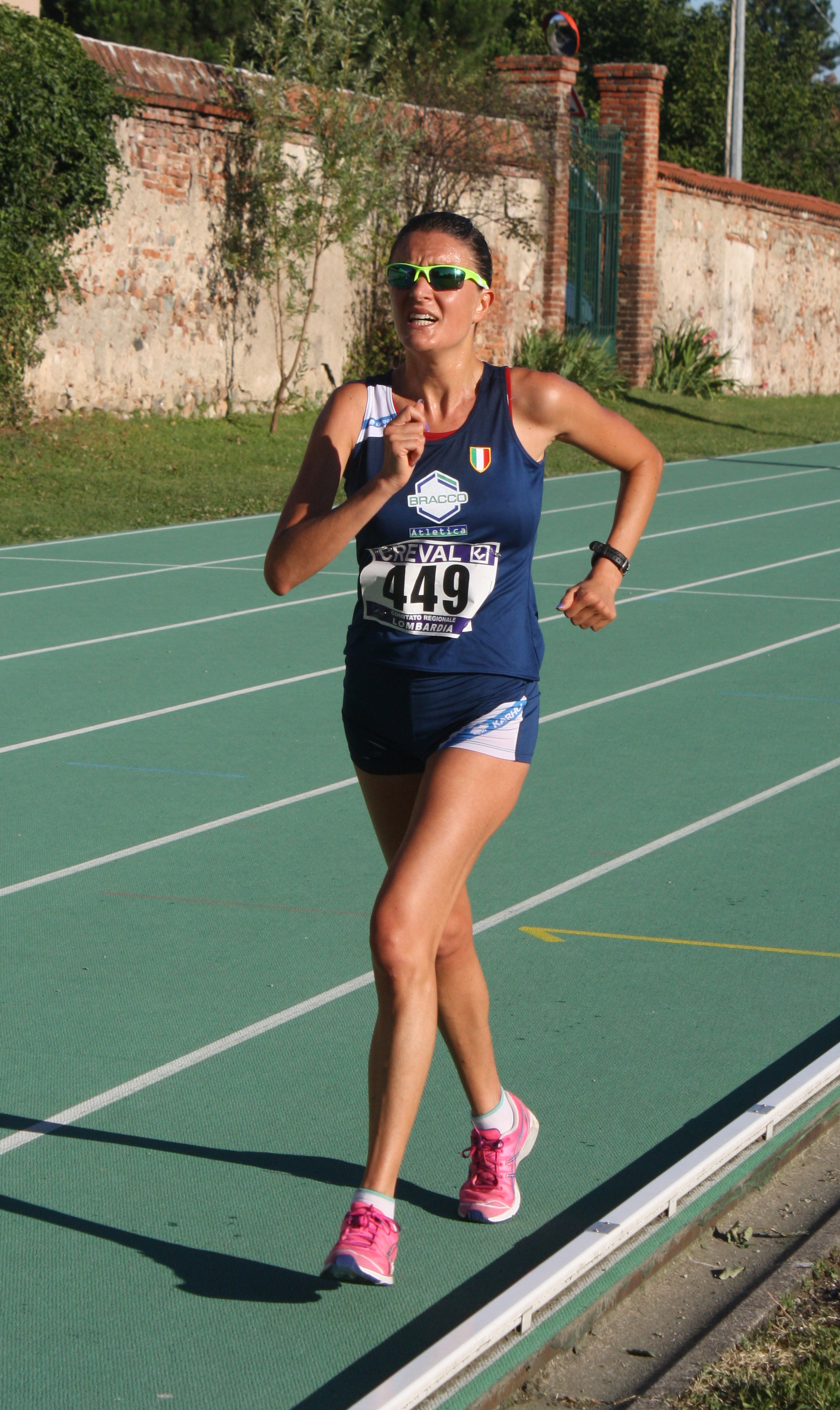
- Trapletti in 2016

Personal information
- National team: Italy (15 caps)
- Born: 12 July 1985 (age 41) Magenta, Italy
- Height: 1.72 m (5 ft 8 in)
- Weight: 58 kg (128 lb)

Sport
- Country: Italy
- Sport: Athletics
- Event: Racewalking
- Club: C.S. Esercito
- Coached by: Enzo Fiorillo

Achievements and titles
- Personal bests: 10000 m walk: 44:04.94 (2017); 20 km walk: 1:29:47 (2022)
Medal record
World Team Championships
| Gold medal – first place | 2024 Antalya | Marathon walk (mixed relay) |
European Championships
| Silver medal – second place | 2024 Rome | 20 km walk |
European Race Walking Cup
| Silver medal – second place | 2015 Murcia | 20 km walk Team |
| Silver medal – second place | 2017 Poděbrady | 20 km walk Team |

Valentina Trapletti (born 12 July 1985) is a female racewalker from Italy, who participated at three World championships and won seven national titles. She competed at the 2020 Summer Olympics, in 20 km walk.

== Biography ==
She competed in the Women's 20 kilometres walk event at the IAAF World Championships of Berlin 2009 and London 2017. His best season was 2009, when she was 24 years old, was 6th at the Universiade of Belgrade and 16th at the World Championships in Berlin, setting up her Personal Best at the all two occasions. She also won two silver medals (in 2015 and 2017) in team rankings of the European Race Walking Cup. In 2018, she competed in the women's 20 kilometres walk event at the 2018 European Athletics Championships held in Berlin, Germany. She finished in 9th place.

== Achievements ==
| Year | Competition | Venue | Position | Event | Time | Notes |
|---|---|---|---|---|---|---|
| 2009 | Universiade | (Serbia) Beograd | 6th | 20 km walk | 1:36.32 | PB |
| 2009 | World Championships | (Germany) Berlin | 16th | 20 km walk | 1:35:33 | PB |
| 2017 | World Championships | (United Kingdom) London | 15th | 20 km walk | 1:30:35 | PB |
| 2019 | World Championships | (Qatar) Doha | 17th | 20 km walk | 1:38:22 | |

== National titles ==
She won 11 national championships at senior level.

- Italian Athletics Championships
  - 10 km walk: road: 2016, 2022, 2023, 2024 (4)
  - 20 km walk: road: 2009, 2015, 2017, 2018, 2022 (5)
  - 5000 m walk indoor: 2020, 2021 (2)

== See also ==
- Italian all-time lists - 20 km walk
