= 2024 World Athletics Race Walking Team Championships =

- Organisers: World Athletics
- Edition: 30th
- Date: 21 April
- Host city: Antalya, Turkey
- Events: 5
- Participation: 431 athletes from 52 nations

The 2024 World Athletics Race Walking Team Championships were the 30th edition of the global team racewalking competition organised by World Athletics.

== Overview ==
The 35 km senior men's and women's races were introduced in 2022, replacing the 50 km race walk. These races will be replaced by a new Marathon Race Walking Mixed Relay on the Marathon distance (42.195 km), with teams of one male and one female racing twice. The rest of the programme will be unchanged, with senior men's and women's races over 20 km and junior category events for both sexes over 10 km.

== Medal Summary ==
=== Men ===
Race	Gold		Silver		Bronze	
10 km (junior)	(Australia) Isaac Beacroft	39:56 AU20R	(China) Shi Shengji	39:57	(China) Luo Jiawei	40:03
10 km (team)	China; Shi Shengji; Luo Jiawei	5 pts	Japan; Sotaro Osaka; Taisei Yoshizako	10 pts	Australia; Isaac Beacroft; Riley Coughman	14 pts
20 km	Sweden; Perseus Karlström	1:18:49	Spain; Paul McGrath	1:19:14	Spain; Diego García	1:19:51
20 km (team)	Spain; Paul McGrath; Diego García; Álvaro López	13 pts	Japan; Yuta Koga; Satoshi Maruo; Tomohiro Noda	26 pts	Italy; Riccardo Orsoni; Gianluca Picchiottino; Michele Antonelli	33 pts

=== Women ===
Race	Gold		Silver		Bronze	
10 km (junior)	(China) Yang Xizhen	45:06	(Spain) Aldara Meilán	45:12	(Spain) Sofia Santacreu	45:17 PB
10 km (team)	Spain; Aldara Meilán; Sofia Santacreu	5 pts	China; Yang Xizhen; Chen Meiling	6 pts	Italy; Giulia Gabriele; Serena Di Fabio	11 pts
20 km	(Peru) Kimberly García	1:27:12	(China) Ma Zhenxia	1:27:55	(Brazil) Érica de Sena	1:29:22 SB
20 km (team)	China; Ma Zhenxia; Ji Haiying; Shi Yuxia	15 pts	Peru; Kimberly García; Evelyn Inga; Mary Luz Andía	15 pts	Spain; Lidia Sanchez-Puebla; Antia Chamosa; Paula Juarez	31 pts

=== Mixed ===
Race	Gold		Silver		Bronze	
Marathon Race Walk Mixed Relay	Italy; Francesco Fortunato; Valentina Trapletti	2:56:45 PB	Japan; Koki Ikeda; Kumiko Okada	2:57:04 PB	Spain; Álvaro Martín; Laura García-Caro	2:57:47

== Results ==
=== Men's 20 km ===
Rank	Name	Nationality	Time	Notes	Penalties
1st place, gold medalist(s)	Perseus Karlström	Sweden	1:18:49		
2nd place, silver medalist(s)	Paul McGrath	Spain	1:19:14		
3rd place, bronze medalist(s)	Diego García Carrera	Spain	1:19:51		
4	Yuta Koga	Japan	1:19:54		~ ~
5	Christopher Linke	Germany	1:19:57	SB	
6	Jordy Rafael Jiménez Arrobo	Ecuador	1:20:04	PB	~ ~
7	Riccardo Orsoni	Italy	1:20:11	PB	
8	Álvaro López	Spain	1:20:20	PB	
9	Satoshi Maruo	Japan	1:20:23		
10	Misgana Wakuma Fekansa	Ethiopia	1:20:51	NR	~ ~
11	Wen Yongjie	China	1:20:58		
12	Gianluca Picchiottino	Italy	1:21:06	PB	~ ~
13	Tomohiro Noda	Japan	1:21:16		~ ~
14	Michele Antonelli	Italy	1:21:18	PB	
15	Andres Eduardo Olivas Núñez	Mexico	1:21:31	SB	~ ~
16	José Luis Doctor	Mexico	1:21:32		~ ~
17	Veli-Matti Partanen	Finland	1:21:32	SB	~
18	Kento Yoshikawa	Japan	1:21:35		~
19	Artur Brzozowski	Poland	1:21:38	SB	~ ~
20	Servin Sebastian	India	1:21:39		~
21	Lu Ning	China	1:21:43		
22	Mazlum Demir	Turkey	1:21:46	PB	~ ~
23	Vikash Singh	India	1:21:59	SB	~ ~
24	Wayne Snyman	South Africa	1:22:00	SB	
25	César Augusto Rodríguez	Peru	1:22:01		~ ~ ~
26	Noel Chama	Mexico	1:22:04	SB	
27	Cui Lihong	China	1:22:05		
28	Iván López	Spain	1:22:18		
29	Marc Tur	Spain	1:22:27		~
30	Matheus Corrêa	Brazil	1:22:41	SB	
31	Karl Junghannß	Germany	1:22:45	SB	~ >
32	Andrea Agrusti	Italy	1:22:52	SB	
33	Emiliano Brigante	Italy	1:22:59	PB	~
34	Mukola Rushchak	Ukraine	1:23:17	PB	
35	Zhao Xiangfei	China	1:23:30		~ ~
36	Aleksi Ojala	Finland	1:23:33		
37	Dimitri Durand	France	1:23:35	PB	~
38	Isaac Palma	Mexico	1:23:41		~ ~
39	Maryan Zakalnytskyy	Ukraine	1:23:47		
40	Suraj Panwar	India	1:24:09		
41	Will Thompson	Australia	1:24:09		~
42	Adam Zajíček	Czech Republic	1:24:10	PB	~
43	Luis Henry Campos	Peru	1:24:15	SB	~ ~ ~
44	Martin Madeline-Degy	France	1:24:50	PB	> ~
45	Cameron Corbishley	United Kingdom	1:25:05		~ ~ ~
46	Ismail Benhammouda	Algeria	1:25:16		
47	Mitchell Baker	Australia	1:25:19	SB	~ >
48	Jerry Jokinen	Finland	1:25:44	SB	
49	Michal Morvay	Slovakia	1:25:47		
50	Viktor Shumik	Ukraine	1:25:49	SB	~
51	Tim Fraser	Australia	1:25:59		~
52	Ryo Hamanishi	Japan	1:26:04		
53	Ozan Bayram	Turkey	1:26:49	PB	> ~
54	Arnis Rumbenieks	Latvia	1:27:05		
55	Joe Mooney	Ireland	1:27:09		
56	Hsu Chia-wei	Chinese Taipei	1:27:13	SB	~
57	Wang Zhaozhao	China	1:27:14		
58	Gabriel Alvarado	Nicaragua	1:27:29	NR	
59	Joni Hava	Finland	1:28:00		
60	Abdennour Ameur	Algeria	1:28:18	PB	> ~ >
61	Jaromír Morávek	Czech Republic	1:28:32		~
62	Yehor Shelest	Ukraine	1:28:34		
63	Aymen Bensaha	Algeria	1:29:15		~ ~ ~
64	Carl Gibbons	Australia	1:30:39		~ ~
65	Harun Bilir	Turkey	1:32:37		~
66	Arshpreet Singh	India	1:33:39		~ >
67	Antonio Farmer	South Africa	1:34:27		
68	John Cody Risch	United States	1:34:56	SB	
69	Juan Montanez	United States	1:35:30	PB	~
70	Paulo Henrique Ribeiro	Brazil	1:37:59	SB	
71	Tumisang Pule	South Africa	1:38:12		> > >
72	Mohamed Fetah Meddour	Algeria	1:40:24		~ ~
73	Darkhаn Assetkhanuly	Kazakhstan	1:40:37		>
74	Joel Pfahler	United States	1:41:03	SB	
75	Abood Khaled Joudah	Jordan	1:43:43	PB	
76	Alex Brown	New Zealand	1:54:38	SB	>
	Ram Baboo	India	DNF		
	Kévin Campion	France	DNF		
	Jason Jya Hsin Cherng	United States	DNF		
	Leo Köpp	Germany	DNF		
	Lucas Mazzo	Brazil	DNF		
	Dylan Richardson	Australia	DNF		
	Hayrettin Yildiz	Turkey	DNF		~
	Rasulbek Dilmurodov	Uzbekistan	DQ		~ > ~ ~ TR54.7.5
	David Hurtado	Ecuador	DQ		~ ~ ~ ~ TR54.7.5
	Brian Daniel Pintado	Ecuador	DQ		~ ~ ~ ~ TR54.7.5
	Şahin Şenoduncu	Turkey	DQ		~ ~ ~ ~ TR54.7.5

=== Team (Men 20 km) ===
Rank	Team	Points
1	Spain	13
2	Japan	26
3	Italy	33
4	Mexico	57
5	China	59
6	India	83
7	Finland	101
8	Ukraine	123
9	Australia	139
10	Turkey	140
11	South Africa	162
12	Algeria	169
13	United States	211

=== Women's 20 km ===
Rank	Name	Nationality	Time	Notes	Penalties
1st place, gold medalist(s)	Kimberly García	Peru	1:27:12		
2nd place, silver medalist(s)	Ma Zhenxia	China	1:27:55		~ ~
3rd place, bronze medalist(s)	Érica de Sena	Brazil	1:29:22	SB	
4	Evelyn Inga	Peru	1:29:26		~ ~ ~
5	Paula Milena Torres	Ecuador	1:29:47		~ ~
6	Ji Haiying	China	1:30:08		~
7	Shi Yuxia	China	1:30:21		~ ~
8	Lidia Sanchez-Puebla	Spain	1:30:24	PB	
9	Antía Chamosa	Spain	1:30:32	PB	
10	Mary Luz Andía	Peru	1:31:05		~ ~
11	Camille Moutard	France	1:31:15		~
12	Yin Lamei	China	1:31:19		
13	Lucy Mendoza	Colombia	1:31:50	PB	
14	Paula Juarez	Spain	1:31:56		~
15	Hanna Shevchuk	Ukraine	1:32:04	SB	~ ~
16	Federica Curiazzi	Italy	1:32:32	PB	~
17	Rachelle de Orbeta	Puerto Rico	1:32:44	SB	
18	Ayane Yanai	Japan	1:32:52		~ ~
19	Sofía Ramos Rodríguez	Mexico	1:32:57	SB	~ ~ ~
20	Peng Li	China	1:33:02		
21	Lucia Redondo	Spain	1:33:03	PB	
22	Alexandrina Mihai	Italy	1:33:19	SB	
23	Panayiota Tsinopoulou	Greece	1:33:29	SB	~ ~
24	Maële Biré-Heslouis	France	1:34:00	PB	~
25	Eleonora Dominici	Italy	1:34:48	SB	> ~
26	Valeriya Sholomitska	Ukraine	1:34:51	PB	
27	Allanah Pitcher	Australia	1:35:04	SB	>
28	Nicole Colombi	Italy	1:35:24		
29	Ayşe Tekdal	Turkey	1:35:34	SB	~ ~
30	Ángela Castro	Bolivia	1:36:11		
31	Yasmina Toxanbayeva	Kazakhstan	1:36:47		
32	Mayara Luize Vicentainer	Brazil	1:36:56	PB	
33	Yaquelin Teletor Jerónimo	Guatemala	1:37:12		~ >
34	Galina Yakusheva	Kazakhstan	1:37:57		
35	Monika Vaiciukevičiūtė	Lithuania	1:38:10	SB	
36	Tiziana Spiller	Hungary	1:38:28		~
37	Natalia Pulido	Colombia	1:38:39	PB	
38	Hannah Mison	Australia	01 1:38:42		
39	Elizabeth McMillen	Australia	1:39:04		
40	Agnieszka Ellward	Poland	1:39:27	SB	>
41	Ema Hačundová	Slovakia	1:39:47	SB	
42	Kumawat Pooja	India	1:40:27		
43	Manju Rani	India	1:40:31		>
44	Mokavi Muthurathinam	India	1:40:33		
45	Laura Langley	New Zealand	1:40:41	PB	
46	Elvina Carré	France	1:41:06		~ ~
47	Magdalena Żelazna	Poland	1:41:13		
48	Jekaterina Mirotvortseva	Estonia	1:41:48	SB	
49	Ramandeep Kaur	India	1:42:12		
50	Payal	India	1:42:32		>
51	Elif Nur Özbey	Turkey	1:45:23	PB	
52	Stephanie Casey	United States	1:45:55	SB	
53	Selin Çadir	Turkey	1:46:02		~
54	Lydia McGranahan	United States	1:46:09	SB	
55	Heta Veikkola	Finland	1:46:24	SB	
56	Marissa Swanepoel	South Africa	1:47:40		
57	Klaudia Žárska	Slovakia	1:47:44		
58	Violine Intan Puspita	Indonesia	1:47:45	PB	
59	Janelle Branch	United States	1:47:53	PB	
60	Gabrielly Cristina Dos Santos	Brazil	1:47:59	SB	
61	Arnika Nelson	New Zealand	1:50:34	PB	~
62	Ruby Ray	United States	1:56:23	PB	~ >
63	Karin Devaldová	Slovakia	1:56:27		
	Enni Nurmi	Finland	DNF		
	Magaly Bonilla	Ecuador	DQ		~ ~ ~ ~ TR54.7.5
	Eleonora Giorgi	Italy	DQ		~ ~ ~ ~ TR54.7.5
	Sintayehu Masire	Ethiopia	DQ		~ ~ ~ ~ TR54.7.5
	Glenda Morejón	Ecuador	DQ		~ ~ ~ ~ TR54.7.5
	Alžbeta Ragasová	Slovakia	DQ		> > > > TR54.7.5
	Ayman Ratova	Kazakhstan	DQ		> > > > TR54.7.5

=== Team (Women 20 km) ===
Rank	Team	Points
1	China	15
2	Peru	15
3	Spain	31
4	Italy	63
5	France	81
6	Brazil	95
7	Australia	104
8	India	129
9	Turkey	133
10	Slovakia	161
11	United States	165

=== Men's 10 km (Junior) ===
Rank	Name	Nationality	Time	Notes	Penalties
1st place, gold medalist(s)	Isaac Beacroft	Australia	39:56	AU20R	~ ~
2nd place, silver medalist(s)	Shi Shengji	China	39:57		~ ~
3rd place, bronze medalist(s)	Luo Jiawei	China	40:03		
4	Sotaro Osaka	Japan	40:30	PB	~
5	Giuseppe Disabato	Italy	40:32	PB	~
6	Taisei Yoshizako	Japan	40:39	PB	~ ~
7	Şeyhmus Çapat	Turkey	40:42	NU20R	~
8	Daniel Monfort	Spain	40:43	PB	
9	Frederick Weigel	Germany	40:53	PB	
10	Jesús Ramírez	Colombia	40:53	PB	~
11	Li Chenjie	China	40:54		~ ~ ~
12	Miguel Espinosa Olivares	Spain	40:55	PB	~
13	Riley Coughlan	Australia	41:03	PB	~ ~
14	Daniel Morilla Garcia	Spain	41:07	PB	
15	Marcus Wakim	Australia	41:15	PB	~ ~
16	Yuki Shimoda	Japan	41:15	PB	
17	Julián Alfonso	Colombia	41:40	PB	
18	Nick Joel Richardt	Germany	41:50	PB	
19	Emiliano Barba	Mexico	41:52	PB	~
20	Mehmet Güngör	Turkey	41:54	PB	> > ~
21	Quentin Chenuet	France	41:57	PB	
22	Bastien Picart	France	42:03	PB	~ ~
23	Alex Mateo Sanchez Guaman	Ecuador	42:06	PB	~
24	Oscar Bocanegra	Mexico	42:16	PB	~ ~ ~
25	Juan Pablo Rojas	Colombia	42:23	PB	
26	Oleksii Polishchuk	Ukraine	42:35	PB	~ ~
27	Filip Krestianko	Slovakia	42:40	PB	
28	Alessio Coppola	Italy	42:45	PB	
29	Hugo Ellul	France	42:57	PB	~
30	Andrea Di Carlo	Italy	42:58	PB	
31	Albert Kukla	Czech Republic	43:29		
32	Jakub Bátovský	Slovakia	43:29	PB	
33	Jonah Cropp	New Zealand	43:45	NU20R	~
34	İlhan Gövce	Turkey	43:51		
35	Klaubert Emanoel Ferreira	Brazil	43:51	PB	~ ~
36	José Duvan Ccoscco Sueldo	Peru	43:56	PB	~
37	Yegor Strukov	Kazakhstan	44:09	PB	
38	Eduard Muravskyi	Ukraine	44:19	PB	
39	Lukas Lasevičius	Lithuania	44:42	PB	~
40	Séamus Clarke	Ireland	44:45	PB	
41	Joao Paulo Nobre	Brazil	44:45	PB	
42	Kacper Gołąbek	Poland	44:49	PB	
43	Przemysław Jasiński	Poland	44:55		~ ~
44	Zharylkasyn Egizbay	Kazakhstan	44:55	PB	~
45	Sherkhan Egizbay	Kazakhstan	45:46	PB	
46	Mateusz Margiel	Poland	46:35	PB	>
47	Lukáš Rosenbaum	Slovakia	46:41		>
48	Toby O'Rorke	New Zealand	47:04	PB	
49	Olwethu Mncibi	South Africa	47:32	PB	
50	Liudas Grincevičius	Lithuania	49:09	PB	
51	Santiago Urbina	Brazil	51:58	PB	

=== Team (Men 10 km Junior) ===
Rank	Team	Points
1	China	5
2	Japan	10
3	Australia	14
4	Spain	20
5	Colombia	27
6	Germany	27
7	Turkey	27
8	Italy	33
9	France	43
10	Mexico	43
11	Slovakia	59
12	Ukraine	64
13	Brazil	76
14	Kazakhstan	81
15	New Zealand	81
16	Poland	85
17	Lithuania	89

=== Women's 10 km (Junior) ===
Rank	Name	Nationality	Time	Notes	Penalties
1st place, gold medalist(s)	Yang Xizhen	China	45:06		
2nd place, silver medalist(s)	Aldara Meilán	Spain	45:12		
3rd place, bronze medalist(s)	Sofia Santacreu	Spain	45:17	PB	~
4	Giulia Gabriele	Italy	45:26	PB	
5	Chen Meiling	China	45:35		
6	Griselda Serret	Spain	46:12	PB	
7	Serena Di Fabio	Italy	46:12	PB	
8	Alessia Cristina Pop	Romania	46:16	PB	
9	Michelle Cantò	Italy	46:27	PB	
10	Ema Klimentová	Czech Republic	46:28	PB	~ ~
11	Duo Jiecuo	China	46:29		~
12	Renata Cortes	Mexico	46:31		~ ~
13	Suzu Okuno	Japan	46:32	PB	
14	Valeria Flores	Mexico	46:40		~ ~
15	Suzuka Kuge	Japan	46:41	PB	~
16	Alexandra Griffin	Australia	46:50	PB	~ ~
17	Ruby Segura	Colombia	47:01	PB	~
18	Chloe Le Roch	France	47:13	PB	
19	Léna Auvray	France	47:38	PB	~ ~
20	Kylie Garreis	Germany	48:20	PB	
21	Heather Durrant	United States	48:34	PB	
22	Zoe Woods	Australia	48:36	PB	~ ~
23	Tülin Ek	Turkey	49:01	PB	~
24	Angelica Harris	United States	49:01	PB	
25	Alžběta Franklová	Czech Republic	49:04	PB	~
26	Marine Merbitz	France	49:05	PB	
27	Yadira Orihuela Poma	Peru	49:08	PB	
28	Alexandra Kovács	Hungary	49:12		>
29	Katherine Dayanna Barreto	Ecuador	49:15	PB	
30	Şeri̇fe Berra Güven	Turkey	49:23	PB	
31	Sumika Tani	Japan	49:24		> >
32	Nellie Langford	Australia	49:28	PB	
33	Margarita Storozhenko	Kazakhstan	49:31	PB	
34	Judit Erdős	Hungary	49:34	PB	~
35	Anna-Maria Gabriel	Germany	49:42		
36	Kristína Zámecnikova	Slovakia	49:53	PB	
37	Akvilé Orliukaité	Lithuania	50:21	SB	
38	Tamara Indrišková	Slovakia	50:43		
39	Sabrina Arziyeva	Kazakhstan	51:09		~ ~ ~
40	Esma Öztekin	Turkey	51:18		> > >
41	Ivana Dudová	Slovakia	51:38		
42	Tabea Kiefer	Germany	51:46		
43	Lee Sue Nyathi	South Africa	51:50	PB	>
44	Aliisa Kiiski	Finland	52:21		
45	Aiva Bilevičiūtė	Lithuania	54:08		
46	Emilia Wiśniewska	Poland	54:28		> > >
47	Thaliane Janaina Miranda	Brazil	54:49	PB	
	Ella Rautawaara	Finland	DNF		~
	Mina Stanković	Serbia	DQ		~ ~ ~ ~ TR54.7.5

=== Team (Women 10 km Junior) ===
Rank	Team	Points
1	Spain	5
2	China	6
3	Italy	11
4	Mexico	26
5	Japan	28
6	Czech Republic	35
7	France	37
8	Australia	38
9	United States	45
10	Turkey	53
11	Germany	55
12	Hungary	62
13	Kazakhstan	72
14	Slovakia	74
15	Lithuania	82

=== Marathon Race Walk Mixed Relay ===
Rank	Team	Athlete	Individual Time	Time	Notes	Penalties
1st place, gold medalist(s)	Italy 2	Francesco Fortunato	48:37 + 40:17	2:56:45	PB	
1st place, gold medalist(s)	Italy 2	Valentina Trapletti	44:05 + 43:46	2:56:45	PB	
2nd place, silver medalist(s)	Japan	Koki Ikeda	47:56 + 40:28	2:57:04	PB	~ ~
2nd place, silver medalist(s)	Japan	Kumiko Okada	44:19 + 44:21	2:57:04	PB	~ ~
3rd place, bronze medalist(s)	Spain	Álvaro Martín	48:02 + 39:48	2:57:47		~ ~
3rd place, bronze medalist(s)	Spain	Laura García-Caro	45:00 + 44:57	2:57:47		~ ~
4	Mexico	Ever Palma	49:03 + 42:43	2:59:21	PB	~
4	Mexico	Alegna González	43:42 + 43:53	2:59:21	PB	~
5	Brazil	Caio Bonfim	48:01 + 40:52	2:59:55	PB	~ ~ ~
5	Brazil	Viviane Lyra	43:54 + 47:08	2:59:55	PB	~ ~ ~
6	Australia	Rhydian Cowley	48:13 + 40:37	3:00:13	PB	~ ~
6	Australia	Jemima Montag	44:16 + 47:07	3:00:13	PB	~ ~
7	Spain 2	Alberto Amezcua	48:38 + 42:08	3:00:37		~
7	Spain 2	Cristina Montesinos	44:33 + 45:18	3:00:37		~
8	Ukraine 3	Ivan Banzeruk	49:42 + 42:12	3:01:03	PB	~
8	Ukraine 3	Olena Sobchuk	43:50 + 45:19	3:01:03	PB	~
9	France	Gabriel Bordier	48:14 + 41:52	3:01:16	PB	~
9	France	Pauline Stey	45:12 + 45:58	3:01:16	PB	~
10	Spain 3	Miguel Ángel López	48:09 + 40:37	3:02:43		~ ~ ~ ~
10	Spain 3	María Pérez	44:26 + 49:31	3:02:43		~ ~ ~ ~
11	China 2	He Xianghong	49:00 + 45:50	3:03:10		~ ~ ~
11	China 2	Qieyang Shijie	43:06 + 45:14	3:03:10		~ ~ ~
12	China	Zhang Jun	48:01 + 43:46	3:03:46		~ ~ ~
12	China	Yang Jiayu	43:59 + 48:00	3:03:46		~ ~ ~
13	Colombia 2	César Herrera	49:51 + 43:33	3:03:48	PB	~ ~
13	Colombia 2	Laura Chalarca	45:16 + 45:08	3:03:48	PB	~ ~
14	Germany	Jonathan Hilbert	50:53 + 41:37	3:04:29	PB	~
14	Germany	Saskia Feige	45:47 + 46:12	3:04:29	PB	~
15	Colombia	Mateo Romero	49:48 + 42:53	3:04:57	PB	~
15	Colombia	Sandra Arenas	45:16 + 47:00	3:04:57	PB	~
16	Australia 2	Declan Tingay	48:12 + 42:14	3:04:57	PB	~ ~ ~
16	Australia 2	Rebecca Henderson	45:20 + 49:11	3:04:57	PB	~ ~ ~
17	Japan 3	Kazuki Takahashi	48:02 + 40:01	3:05:02	PB	> ~
17	Japan 3	Masumi Fuchise	47:30 + 49:29	3:05:02	PB	> ~
18	India	Akshdeep Singh	49:30 + 43:38	3:05:03	PB	
18	India	Priyanka Goswami	45:05 + 46:50	3:05:03	PB	
19	Mexico 2	Ricardo Ortiz	48:41 + 41:44	3:05:22		~ ~ ~
19	Mexico 2	Ilse Guerrero	45:12 + 49:45	3:05:22		~ ~ ~
20	Turkey	Salih Korkmaz	48:37 + 43:52	3:05:33	PB	~ ~ ~ ~ ~ ~
20	Turkey	Meryem Bekmez	47:35 + 45:29	3:05:33	PB	~ ~ ~ ~ ~ ~
21	Slovakia	Dominik Černý	50:51 + 40:39	3:05:38	PB	
21	Slovakia	Hana Černá	47:28 + 46:40	3:05:38	PB	
22	Ukraine 2	Serhii Svitlychnyi	49:38 + 44:31	3:05:55	PB	~ ~ ~ ~
22	Ukraine 2	Lyudmyla Olyanovska	47:29 + 44:17	3:05:55	PB	~ ~ ~ ~
23	Poland 2	Dawid Tomala	50:53 + 44:10	3:05:56	PB	~ ~
23	Poland 2	Katarzyna Zdziebło	44:46 + 46:07	3:05:56	PB	~ ~
24	Slovakia 2	Miroslav Úradník	50:38 + 41:42	3:06:11	PB	~ ~ ~
24	Slovakia 2	Mária Katerinka Czaková	45:09 + 48:42	3:06:11	PB	~ ~ ~
25	China 3	Li Yandong	49:28 + 46:57	3:06:40		~ ~ ~
25	China 3	Liu Hong	43:20 + 46:55	3:06:40		~ ~ ~
26	Canada	Evan Dunfee	48:10 + 40:24	3:07:10	PB	>
26	Canada	Olivia Lundman	48:00 + 50:36	3:07:10	PB	>
27	Japan 2	Masatora Kawano	47:57 + 41:15	3:07:28	SB	~ ~
27	Japan 2	Yukiko Umeno	47:49 + 50:27	3:07:28	SB	~ ~
28	Ukraine	Ihor Hlavan	49:08 + 44:00	3:07:29	PB	~ ~ ~ ~
28	Ukraine	Mariia Sakharuk	47:18 + 47:03	3:07:29	PB	~ ~ ~ ~
29	Poland	Maher Ben Hlima	48:27 + 42:55	3:07:31	PB	~ ~ ~ ~ ~ ~
29	Poland	Olga Chojecka	48:35 + 47:34	3:07:31	PB	~ ~ ~ ~ ~ ~
30	Australia 3	Kyle Swan	49:56 + 44:41	3:07:38	PB	~ ~
30	Australia 3	Olivia Sandery	46:07 + 46:54	3:07:38	PB	~ ~
31	Hungary	Bence Venyercsán	50:53 + 43:19	3:07:46	PB	~ ~
31	Hungary	Rita Récsei	46:34 + 47:00	3:07:46	PB	~ ~
32	Portugal	João Vieira	51:37 + 46:58	3:08:44	PB	
32	Portugal	Vitória Oliveira	44:53 + 45:16	3:08:44	PB	
33	France 2	Aurélien Quinion	49:18 + 42:32	3:08:48	PB	~ ~ ~ ~ ~
33	France 2	Clémence Beretta	48:06 + 48:52	3:08:48	PB	~ ~ ~ ~ ~
34	Czech Republic	Vít Hlaváč	50:42 + 43:45	3:08:52	PB	~ ~ ~ ~
34	Czech Republic	Eliška Martínková	47:40 + 46:45	3:08:52	PB	~ ~ ~ ~
35	India 2	Paramjeet Singh Bisht	49:38 + 44:14	3:09:58	PB	~
35	India 2	Munita Prajapati	46:34 + 49:32	3:09:58	PB	~
36	Greece	Alexandros Papamichail	50:51 + 43:31	3:10:11	PB	~ ~
36	Greece	Kiriaki Filtisakou	46:34 + 49:15	3:10:11	PB	~ ~
37	Greece 2	Ioannis Kafkas	51:06 + 44:01	3:11:05	PB	~ ~
37	Greece 2	Olga Fiaska	47:22 + 48:36	3:11:05	PB	~ ~
38	Kazakhstan	Georgiy Sheiko	50:53 + 42:56	3:11:19	PB	~ ~ ~
38	Kazakhstan	Kristina Morozova	45:33 + 51:57	3:11:19	PB	~ ~ ~
39	Guatemala	José Alejandro Barrondo	49:49 + 44:06	3:11:52	PB	
39	Guatemala	Maritza Rafaela Poncio Tzul	47:38 + 50:19	3:11:52	PB	
40	Lithuania	Marius Žiūkas	51:23 + 43:00	3:12:12	PB	>
40	Lithuania	Brigita Virbalytė-Dimšienė	47:52 + 49:57	3:12:12	PB	>
41	United States	Nick Christie	51:58 + 44:27	3:12:53	PB	
41	United States	Robyn Stevens	47:37 + 48:51	3:12:53	PB	
42	Peru	Kevin Cahuana	51:23 + 44:18	3:14:23	SB	~
42	Peru	Jocy Caballero	48:22 + 50:20	3:14:23	SB	~
43	France 3	Mattéo Duc	51:46 + 44:03	3:14:46	PB	
43	France 3	Ana Delahaie	48:28 + 50:29	3:14:46	PB	
44	Mexico 3	Brandon Segura	50:09 + 48:44	3:14:55		~ ~ ~
44	Mexico 3	Vivian Castillo	49:03 + 46:59	3:14:55		~ ~ ~
45	Lithuania 2	Arturas Mastianica	51:57 + 46:28	3:16:29	PB	
45	Lithuania 2	Austėja Kavaliauskaitė	47:55 + 50:09	3:16:29	PB	
46	Guatemala 3	Bernardo Barrondo	49:57 + 47:23	3:16:54	PB	~ ~ ~
46	Guatemala 3	María Fernanda Peinado	48:12 + 51:22	3:16:54	PB	~ ~ ~
47	South Korea	Choe Byeong-kwang	50:23 + 44:14	3:18:00	PB	~ ~ ~
47	South Korea	Lee Jeong-eun	48:29 + 54:54	3:18:00	PB	~ ~ ~
48	Romania	Narcis Stefan Mihăilă	52:55 + 46:47	3:18:20	PB	
48	Romania	Maria Diana Lataretu	47:26 + 51:12	3:18:20	PB	
49	Portugal 2	Rui Coelho	55:26 + 44:39	3:19:56		~
49	Portugal 2	Inês Mendes	48:35 + 51:16	3:19:56		~
50	Turkey 2	Diyar Bayram	53:52 + 45:44	3:20:00	PB	~ ~ ~
50	Turkey 2	Kader Dost	47:39 + 52:45	3:20:00	PB	~ ~ ~
51	Brazil 2	Max Batista Goncalves Dos Santos	55:58 + 45:57	3:20:51	SB	~ ~ ~ ~ ~
51	Brazil 2	Gabriela de Sousa	48:02 + 50:54	3:20:51	SB	~ ~ ~ ~ ~
52	Croatia	Bruno Erent	55:08 + 47:02	3:21:50	PB	~
52	Croatia	Lana Švarbić	49:06 + 50:34	3:21:50	PB	~
53	Hong Kong	Man Kit Chin	54:45 + 46:40	3:22:04	PB	
53	Hong Kong	Ching Siu Nga	49:45 + 50:54	3:22:04	PB	
54	South Africa	Sizwe Ndebele	55:34 + 47:18	3:22:10	PB	
54	South Africa	Jessica Groenewald	49:17 + 50:01	3:22:10	PB	
55	Algeria	Sohail Abderahmane Aloui	54:58 + 50:20	3:23:14	PB	~ ~ ~
55	Algeria	Souad Azzi	47:14 + 50:42	3:23:14	PB	~ ~ ~
56	United States 3	Emmanuel Corvera	54:41 + 46:13	3:24:46		
56	United States 3	Celina Lepe	50:52 + 53:00	3:24:46		
57	United States 2	Jordan Crawford	55:34 + 52:16	3:25:07		~ ~ ~
57	United States 2	Miranda Melville	48:22 + 48:55	3:25:07		~ ~ ~
58	Greece 3	Georgios Kritoulis	58:00 + 47:38	3:27:46		~ ~
58	Greece 3	Sofia Alikanioti	49:56 + 52:12	3:27:46		~ ~
59	South Korea 2	Joo Hyun-myeong	53:06 + 46:10	3:28:01	PB	~
59	South Korea 2	Kim Minji	50:35 + 58:10	3:28:01	PB	~
60	Croatia 2	Edmond Dobruna	58:53 + 52:37	3:29:49	PB	~ ~ ~ ~
60	Croatia 2	Ivana Renić	48:14 + 50:05	3:29:49	PB	~ ~ ~ ~
61	Indonesia	Hendro	56:06 + 52:02	3:40:50	PB	
61	Indonesia	Halida Ulfah	53:31 + 59:11	3:40:50	PB	
62	Venezuela	Angel Jesus Peroza	58:10 + 57:46	3:42:53	PB	~ ~ ~ > ~
62	Venezuela	Milángela Francesca Rosales	51:23 + 55:34	3:42:53	PB	~ ~ ~ > ~
63	Mauritius	Jerome Caprice	1:02:53 + 55:57	4:00:42	PB	> >
63	Mauritius	Prisca Manikion	59:07 + 1:02:45	4:00:42	PB	> >
	Guatemala 2	Erick Bernabé Barrondo	54:27	DNF		~ ~ ~ ~ ~
	Guatemala 2	Mirna Ortiz		DNF		~ ~ ~ ~ ~
	Ireland	Brendan Boyce		DNF		
	Ireland	Kate Veale		DNF		
	Italy	Massimo Stano	48:31	DNF		
	Italy	Antonella Palmisano		DNF		
	Ecuador	Jhonatan Javier Amores Carua	50:06 + 47:11	DQ		~ ~ ~
	Ecuador	Karla Jaramillo	48:59 + 48:45	DQ		~ ~ ~

== Medal table ==
=== Overall ===
Overall of the 9 events senior and junior (Men and Women).

* Host nation (Turkey)

Rank	Nation	Gold	Silver	Bronze	Total
1	China (CHN)	3	3	1	7
2	Spain (ESP)	2	2	4	8
3	Peru (PER)	1	1	0	2
4	Italy (ITA)	1	0	2	3
5	Australia (AUS)	1	0	1	2
6	Sweden (SWE)	1	0	0	1
7	Japan (JPN)	0	3	0	3
8	Brazil (BRA)	0	0	1	1
Totals (8 entries)		9	9	9	27

=== Senior ===
Men and Women's 5 events (individual and team)

* Host nation (Turkey)

Rank	Nation	Gold	Silver	Bronze	Total
1	Spain (ESP)	1	1	3	5
2	China (CHN)	1	1	0	2
2	Peru (PER)	1	1	0	2
4	Italy (ITA)	1	0	1	2
5	Sweden (SWE)	1	0	0	1
6	Japan (JPN)	0	2	0	2
7	Brazil (BRA)	0	0	1	1
Totals (7 entries)		5	5	5	15

=== Junior ===
Men and women's 4 events (individual and team)

* Host nation (Turkey)

Rank	Nation	Gold	Silver	Bronze	Total
1	China (CHN)	2	2	1	5
2	Spain (ESP)	1	1	1	3
3	Australia (AUS)	1	0	1	2
4	Japan (JPN)	0	1	0	1
5	Italy (ITA)	0	0	1	1
Totals (5 entries)		4	4	4	12

== Participants ==
A total of 431 competitors from the national teams of the following 52 countries are registered to compete at 2024 World Athletics Race Walking Team Championships.

- Algeria (6)
- Australia (21)
- Bolivia (1)
- Brazil (14)
- Canada (2)
- China (27)
- Chinese Taipei (1)
- Colombia (10)
- Croatia (4)
- Czech Republic (7)
- Ecuador (10)
- Egypt (2)
- Estonia (1)
- Ethiopia (2)
- Finland (8)
- France (21)
- Germany (13)
- Great Britain (1)
- Greece (7)
- Guatemala (8)
- Hong Kong (2)
- Hungary (6)
- India (14)
- Indonesia (3)
- Ireland (6)
- Italy (23)
- Japan (19)
- Jordan (1)
- Kazakhstan (11)
- Kenya (9)
- Latvia (1)
- Lithuania (9)
- Mauritius (2)
- Mexico (15)
- New Zealand (5)
- Nicaragua (1)
- Peru (9)
- Poland (11)
- Portugal (4)
- Puerto Rico (1)
- Romania (3)
- Serbia (1)
- Slovakia (15)
- South Africa (8)
- South Korea (4)
- Spain (28)
- Sweden (1)
- Turkey (19)
- Ukraine (14)
- United States (18)
- Uzbekistan (1)
- Venezuela (2)
