= 2026 World Athletics Race Walking Team Championships =

Athletics edition in Brasília, Brazil

- Host city: Brasília
- Country: Brazil
- Organizer: World Athletics
- Edition: 31st
- Nations: 40
- Athletes: 333
- Events: 12
- Dates: 12 April 2026
- Race length: 10K, Half marathon, Marathon
- Website: Brasilia26

The 2026 World Athletics Race Walking Team Championships took place in Brasília, Brazil, on 12 April 2026 and were the 31st edition of the global team race walking competition organised by World Athletics. They included the World Athletics Half Marathon Race Walk and Marathon distance (42.195 km) Race Walk Championships, which were last held in 2024 Antalya, Turkey. The junior (U20) category events for both male and female took place over 10 km.

== Championships timetable ==
Sunday, April 12, 2026
6:45 a.m. BRT (UTC−3) - Men & Women's Marathon

7:15 a.m. BRT (UTC−3) - Men's (U20) 10 km

8:15 a.m. BRT (UTC−3) - Women's (U20) 10 km

11:05 a.m. BRT (UTC−3) - Men's Half Marathon

12:50 p.m. BRT (UTC−3) - Women's Half Marathon

== Participation ==
A total of 333 athletes are entered for the championships, with 40 teams being represented: 40 nations and the Athlete Refugee Team.

- Australia (17)
- Bolivia (02)
- Brazil (26)
- Canada (04)
- China (26)
- Colombia (09)
- Czech Republic (01)
- Costa Rica (01)
- Ecuador (16)
- Ethiopia (04)
- Finland (01)
- France (07)
- Germany (04)
- Great Britain (01)
- Guatemala (08)
- India (10)
- Indonesia (03)
- Ireland (03)
- Italy (26)
- Japan (17)
- Jordan (01)
- Kenya (09)
- Mauritius (01)
- Mexico (25)
- New Zealand (05)
- Peru (11)
- Poland (05)
- Portugal (05)
- Puerto Rico (04)
- Slovakia (05)
- Spain (17)
- Turkey (12)
- United States (17)

== Medal table ==
=== Overall ===
Overall of the 12 events senior and junior (Men and Women).

* Host nation (Brazil)

Rank	Nation	Gold	Silver	Bronze	Total
1	China (CHN)	3	1	2	6
2	Japan (JPN)	3	0	2	5
3	Italy (ITA)	2	5	1	8
4	Ecuador (ECU)	2	1	1	4
5	Peru (PER)	1	0	0	1
5	Ukraine (UKR)	1	0	0	1
7	Spain (ESP)	0	2	2	4
8	Australia (AUS)	0	1	2	3
9	Ethiopia (ETH)	0	1	0	1
9	Mexico (MEX)	0	1	0	1
11	Brazil (BRA)*	0	0	2	2
Totals (11 entries)		12	12	12	36

== Senior Men Marathon ==
Individual race
Rank	Athlete	Country	Time (h:m:s)	Notes
1st place, gold medalist(s)	Hayato Katsuki	Japan	3:04:58	CR
2nd place, silver medalist(s)	David Hurtado	Ecuador	3:05:57	AR
3rd place, bronze medalist(s)	Kazuya Iwai	Japan	3:06:03	
4	César Herrera	Colombia	3:06:59	NR
5	Massimo Stano	Italy	3:07:38	PB
6	Aurélien Quinion	France	3:07:53	PB
7	Riccardo Orsoni	Italy	3:08:09	PB
8	Andrea Agrusti	Italy	3:08:26	
9	Subaru Ishida	Japan	3:10:34	
10	Bernardo Barrondo	Guatemala	3:11:17	
11	Karl Junghannss	Germany	3:12:10	
12	Manuel Bermúdez	Spain	3:13:10	PB
13	Daniel Chamosa	Spain	3:13:10	PB
14	Samuel Gathimba	Kenya	3:13:20	PB
15	José Luis Doctor	Mexico	3:13:39	PB
16	José Manuel Pérez	Spain	3:13:39	
17	Ram Baboo	India	3:13:55	
18	Erick Barrondo	Guatemala	3:14:15	PB
19	Andrés Olivas	Mexico	3:15:30	
20	Sandeep Kumar	India	3:15:41	
21	He Xianghong	China	3:15:52	
22	Xavier Mena	Ecuador	3:16:21	PB
23	Mitchell Baker	Australia	3:17:06	
24	Aldo Andrei	Italy	3:17:35	PB
25	Heristone Wafula	Kenya	3:17:47	PB
26	Josafat Sánchez Peña	Mexico	3:18:32	
27	Christopher Linke	Germany	3:18:59	
28	Zhu Xiaoqiang	China	3:19:14	
29	Johannes Frenzl	Germany	3:19:23	
30	Jinson Calderón	Ecuador	3:19:40	
31	Paulo Henrique Ribeiro	Brazil	3:21:26	PB
32	Cam Corbishley	Great Britain	3:21:38	
33	Stefano Chiesa	Italy	3:21:53	
34	Carl Gibbons	Australia	3:22:53	PB
35	Carlos Mercenario	Mexico	3:23:10	
36	Oscar Patín	Ecuador	3:24:36	
37	Roberto Marroquín	Guatemala	3:28:22	
38	Gao Yanlong	China	3:28:56	
39	Wang Jinxi	China	3:32:25	
40	Felix Kipkemoi	Kenya	3:35:01	PB
41	Qu Tao	China	3:35:37	
42	Stephen Kihu	Kenya	3:36:04	PB
43	Diego Pereira Lima	Brazil	3:39:34	PB
44	Edson Alves de Aguiar	Brazil	3:39:45	PB
45	Peter Muigai	Kenya	3:46:29	PB
46	Bricyn Healey	United States	3:48:15	PB
47	Klaubert Ferreira	Brazil	3:51:01	PB
48	Rudney Dias Nogueira	Brazil	3:51:57	PB
49	Michael Mannozzi	United States	4:06:59	
	Julio César Salazar	Mexico	DNF	
	Ozan Bayram	Turkey	DNF	
	Harun Bilir	Turkey	DNF	
	Diyar Bayram	Turkey	DQ	
	Perseus Karlström	Sweden	DNS	

Team race
Rank	Team	Points
1st place, gold medalist(s)	Japan; Hayato Katsuki (1); Kazuya Iwai (3); Subaru Ishida (9)	13 pts
2nd place, silver medalist(s)	Italy; Massimo Stano (5); Riccardo Orsoni (7); Andrea Agrusti (8)	20 pts
3rd place, bronze medalist(s)	Spain; Manuel Bermúdez (12); Daniel Chamosa (13); José Manuel Pérez (16)	41 pts
4	Ecuador; David Hurtado (2); Xavier Mena (22); Jinson Calderón (30)	54 pts
5	Mexico; José Luis Doctor (15); Andrés Olivas (19); Josafat Sánchez Peña (26)	60 pts
6	Guatemala; Bernardo Barrondo (10); Erick Barrondo (18); Roberto Marroquín (37)	65 pts
7	Germany; Karl Junghannß (11); Christopher Linke (27); Johannes Frenzl (29)	67 pts
8	Kenya; Samuel Gathimba (14); Heristone Wafula (25); Felix Kipkemoi (40); Stephen Kihu (42); Peter Muigai (45)	79 pts
9	China; He Xianghong (21); Zhu Xiaoqiang (28); Gao Yanlong (38); Wang Jinxi (39); Qu Tao (41)	87 pts
10	Brazil; Paulo Henrique Ribeiro (31); Diego Pereira Lima (43); Edson Alves de Aguiar (44); Klaubert Ferreira (47); Rudney Dias Nogueira (48)	118 pts

== Senior Women Marathon ==
Individual race
Rank	Athlete	Country	Time (m:s)	Notes
1st place, gold medalist(s)	Paula Milena Torres	Ecuador	3:24:37	CR, AR
2nd place, silver medalist(s)	Sofia Fiorini	Italy	3:25:42	PB
3rd place, bronze medalist(s)	Nathaly Leon	Ecuador	3:31:47	PB
4	Federica Curiazzi	Italy	3:32:21	PB
5	Viviane Lyra	Brazil	3:34:53	SB
6	Jiahui Zhang	China	3:35:23	
7	Eleonora Giorgi	Italy	3:35:46	PB
8	Karla Jaramillo	Ecuador	3:40:42	PB
9	Magaly Bonilla	Ecuador	3:42:25	SB
10	Priyanka Goswami	India	3:43:01	
11	Gabriela De Souza	Brazil	3:46:07	PB
12	Mayara Vicentainer	Brazil	3:47:09	PB
13	Ayşe Aslan	Turkey	3:48:48	PB
14	Johana Ordóñez	Ecuador	3:48:56	
15	Quzhen Sangdan	China	3:50:41	
16	Maria Michta-Coffey	United States	3:52:38	
17	Joana Pontes	Portugal	3:52:43	
18	Kader Güvenç	Turkey	3:53:45	
19	Renata Cortes	Mexico	3:53:59	PB
20	Yanhong Li	China	3:54:15	
21	Arisay Cruz Salinas	Mexico	3:54:52	PB
22	Katie Burnett	United States	3:55:14	PB
23	Naomi Garcia	Puerto Rico	3:55:30	PB
24	Lydia McGranahan	United States	3:57:39	PB
25	Estrella Rojas Ramos	Peru	3:59:02	PB
26	Ricuo Xi	China	3:59:28	
27	PAYAL	India	3:59:50	
28	Xinyu Li	China	3:59:56	
29	Brigitte Coaquira Albarracín	Peru	4:01:08	PB
30	Lidia Barcella	Italy	4:01:58	
31	Manju Rani	India	4:05:22	
32	Milángela Francesca Rosales	Venezuela	4:07:16	PB
33	Mariela Sánchez Terán	Mexico	NO TIME	
34	Stephanie Casey	United States	NO TIME	
35	Katherine Miale	United States	NO TIME	
36	Elianay Pereira	Brazil	DNF	
37	Thaissa Gabrielle Santos	Brazil	DNF	
38	Sofía Ramos Rodríguez	Mexico	DNF	
39	Esma Öztekin	Turkey	DNF	
40	Olivia Lundman	Canada	DQ (TR54.7.5)	

Team race
Rank	Team	Points
1st place, gold medalist(s)	Ecuador	12 pts
2nd place, silver medalist(s)	Italy	13 pts
3rd place, bronze medalist(s)	Brazil	28 pts
4	China	41 pts
5	United States	62 pts
6	India	68 pts
7	Mexico	73 pts

== Junior Men 10 km ==
Individual race
Rank	Athlete	Country	Time (m:s)
1st place, gold medalist(s)	Huajia Pu	China	39:58
2nd place, silver medalist(s)	Isaac Beacroft	Australia	40:47
3rd place, bronze medalist(s)	Alessio Coppola	Italy	41:16
4	Nicolò Vidal	Italy	41:25
5	Emiliano Barba	Mexico	41:47
6	Chengxi Shi	China	41:51
7	Haoze Zhang	China	42:07
8	Pablo Zárate	Spain	42:11
9	Ryuta Tainaka	Japan	42:16
10	Eloi Anton	Spain	42:21
11	Yasin Abduselam Abdulwahab	Ethiopia	42:21
12	Owen Toyne	Australia	42:24
13	José Duvan Ccoscco Sueldo	Peru	42:46
14	Cesar Hidalgo	Spain	42:57
15	Derian Jair Robalino Cordona	Ecuador	42:58
16	Osvaldo Miramontes	Mexico	43:35
17	Toshiya Inoue	Japan	43:39
18	Cristian Cecchetto	Italy	43:53
19	Daichi Yamada	Japan	43:55
20	Sebastia Vinicio Barrera Quinde	Ecuador	44:05
21	Matthew Newell	Ireland	44:08
22	Azadullah Beğçe	Turkey	44:51
23	Przemysław Jasiński	Poland	44:52
24	Séamus Clarke	Ireland	44:54
25	John Glennon	Ireland	45:09
26	Sérgio Nieto	Colombia	45:17
27	Gael Plasencia	United States	45:42
28	Davi Gabriel Bastos	Brazil	45:43
29	Lukáš Rosenbaum	Slovakia	46:15
30	Jakub Mažgút	Slovakia	46:45
31	Vinicius Da Silva	Brazil	47:04
32	Mateus Ribeiro Pereira Dos Santos	Brazil	47:31
33	Yamkela Luthsa Shosha	South Africa	48:27
34	Dylan Sebastian Acedo	Mexico	49:00
35	Ari Bennett	New Zealand	50:09
	John Ronan	Australia	DQ (TR54.7.5)
	Clement Rabreau	France	DQ (TR54.7.5)
	Gabriel González	Venezuela	DQ (TR54.7.5)

Team race
Rank	Team	Points
1st place, gold medalist(s)	Italy	7 pts
2nd place, silver medalist(s)	China	7 pts
3rd place, bronze medalist(s)	Australia	14 pts
4	Spain	18 pts
5	Mexico	21 pts
6	Japan	26 pts
7	Ecuador	35 pts
8	Ireland	45 pts
9	Slovakia	59 pts
10	Brazil	59 pts

== Junior Women 10 km ==
Individual race
Rank	Athlete	Country	Time (m:s)
1st place, gold medalist(s)	Yutong Yang	China	46:11
2nd place, silver medalist(s)	Serena Di Fabio	Italy	46:21
3rd place, bronze medalist(s)	Lihua Ni	China	46:37
4	Chloe Le Roch	France	47:18
5	Yaru Wang	China	47:27
6	Yuna Uchiyama	Japan	47:57
7	Suzu Okuno	Japan	48:37
8	Harumi Tabata	Japan	48:46
9	Hiwot Ambaw	Ethiopia	48:52 PB
10	Valentina Adamo	Italy	48:57
11	Aleksandra Zembrowska	Poland	49:11
12	Veronika Tkachuk	Ukraine	49:14
13	Irene Vega	Spain	49:17
14	Katherine Dayanna Barreto	Ecuador	49:39
15	Natalia Mendiola	Mexico	50:13 PB
16	Ella Rautawaara	Finland	50:15 SB
17	Şerife Berra Güven	Turkey	50:26
18	Andia Arotaipe Rocio	Peru	50:32 PB
19	Mercyline Nakhumicha Wanjala	Kenya	50:44 PB
20	Francesca Gloria Buselli	Italy	50:53
21	Nelci Rojas	Bolivia	51:04 PB
22	Zoe Woods	Australia	51:10
23	Lourdes Vega Huallpa	Peru	51:30
24	Sophie Polkinghorne	Australia	51:30
25	Gina Torres	Spain	51:39
26	Naomi Luis	Mexico	51:43 SB
27	Danna Rivera	Colombia	51:52 PB
28	Isabel Luís	Portugal	51:54
29	Kristína Zámečníková	Slovakia	52:09
30	Ipek Özkavlak	Turkey	52:37
31	Matilda Webb	Australia	52:57
32	Melany Yamileth Martin Del Campo	Mexico	52:59
33	Petra Kusá	Slovakia	53:14 SB
34	Gabriela Beatriz Barros	Brazil	55:47
35	Vitoria Silva	Brazil	57:44
36	Genesis Toro	Venezuela	57:45 PB
37	Mariana Dias	Brazil	58:05
38	Alysa Brown	Australia	1:00:35

Team race
Rank	Team	Points
1st place, gold medalist(s)	China	4 pts
2nd place, silver medalist(s)	Italy	12 pts
3rd place, bronze medalist(s)	Japan	13 pts
4	Spain	38 pts
5	Peru	41 pts
6	Mexico	41 pts
7	Australia	46 pts
8	Turkey	47 pts
9	Slovakia	62 pts
10	Brazil	69 pts

== Senior Men Half-Marathon ==
Individual race
Rank	Athlete	Country	Time (m:s)	Notes
1st place, gold medalist(s)	Francesco Fortunato	Italy	1:27:25	CR
2nd place, silver medalist(s)	Misgana Wakuma	Ethiopia	1:27:33	PB
3rd place, bronze medalist(s)	Caio Bonfim	Brazil	1:27:36	
4	Leo Köpp	Germany	1:27:50	PB
5	Kento Yoshikawa	Japan	1:28:00	
6	Jordy Jiménez	Ecuador	1:28:00	SB
7	Toshikazu Yamanishi	Japan	1:28:18	
8	Tomohiro Noda	Japan	1:28:42	
9	Diego García	Spain	1:28:55	
10	Álvaro López	Spain	1:29:08	
11	Ricardo Ortiz	Mexico	1:29:18	
12	Will Thompson	Australia	1:29:42	
13	Xinrui Zhang	China	1:29:44	
14	Saul Wamputsri	Ecuador	1:29:44	PB
15	Shuo Ding	China	1:29:45	
16	Kazuki Takahashi	Japan	1:29:48	
17	Satoshi Maruo	Japan	1:29:54	
18	Éider Arévalo	Colombia	1:30:16	SB
19	Servin Sebasthiyan	India	1:30:28	
20	Paul McGrath	Spain	1:30:34	
21	Tim Fraser	Australia	1:30:37	
22	Rhydian Cowley	Australia	1:31:09	
23	Congshan Bi	China	1:31:19	
24	Maher Ben Hlima	Poland	1:31:24	PB
25	Serhii Svitlychnyi	Ukraine	1:31:46	
26	Max Batista Goncalves dos Santos	Brazil	1:31:51	PB
27	Declan Tingay	Australia	1:31:56	
28	Mazlum Demir	Turkey	1:31:58	PB
29	Salih Korkmaz	Turkey	1:32:15	PB
30	Andrea Cosi	Italy	1:32:27	
31	Gianluca Picchiottino	Italy	1:33:21	
32	Xiangfei Zhao	China	1:33:50	
33	João Vieira	Portugal	1:33:56	
34	Mukola Rushchak	Ukraine	1:34:17	
35	Jaime Ccanto	Peru	1:34:25	PB
36	Lihong Cui	China	1:34:51	
37	Noel Chama	Mexico	1:34:53	
38	Giuseppe Disabato	Italy	1:35:19	
39	Nick Christie	United States	1:35:36	
40	Evan Dunfee	Canada	1:35:36	PB
41	Miguel Peña	Colombia	1:35:49	
42	Mateusz Nowak	Poland	1:35:49	
43	Kevin Cahuana	Peru	1:36:05	PB
44	Daniel Monfort	Spain	1:36:18	
45	José Eduardo Ortiz	Guatemala	1:36:21	
46	Michal Morvay	Slovakia	1:37:03	
47	Jhon Sebastian Chamba Sarango	Ecuador	1:37:26	
48	Luis Henry Campos	Peru	1:38:00	
49	Emmanuel Corvera	United States	1:38:03	PB
50	Akshdeep Singh	India	1:38:19	
51	Isaac Palma	Mexico	1:38:23	
52	Jordan Crawford	United States	1:39:39	PB
53	Jesús Ramírez	Colombia	1:39:40	
54	Kyle Swan	Australia	1:40:49	
55	Hendro	Indonesia	1:42:00	SB
56	Tumisang Pule	South Africa	1:42:04	
57	Hardeep	India	1:42:28	
58	Jason Jya Hsin Cherng	United States	1:43:01	
59	Sahil	India	1:43:11	
60	Eduardo Camarate	Portugal	1:43:44	
61	Jefferson Jesús Chacón García	Venezuela	1:45:10	SB
62	Lowell Solmes	Canada	1:45:13	
63	Lucas Martin (racewalker)	New Zealand	1:46:10	PB
64	Jonah Cropp	New Zealand	1:47:34	PB
65	Antonio Farmer	South Africa	1:47:51	
66	Pedro Marquez Pereira	Venezuela	1:49:07	PB
67	Joao Paulo Nobre	Brazil	1:50:40	
68	Sebastian Quinones	Puerto Rico	1:50:46	
69	Jerome Caprice	Mauritius	1:51:11	SB
70	Toby Paul O'Rorke	New Zealand	1:52:17	PB
71	Nathan Limas	United States	1:53:08	
72	Tyler Wilson	Canada	NO TIME	
73	Jan Ramirez	Puerto Rico	NO TIME	
74	Ihor Hlavan	Ukraine	NO TIME	
75	Edmund Chye Soon	Singapore	NO TIME	
76	Abood Khaled Joudah	Jordan	DNF	
77	Brandon Segura	Mexico	DNF	
78	Rivers Williams	South Africa	DNF	
79	Lucas Mazzo	Brazil	DQ (TR54.7.5)	
80	José Alejandro Barrondo	Guatemala	DQ (TR54.7.5)	
81	Michele Antonelli	Italy	DQ (TR54.7.5)	
82	Ismael Bernal	Mexico	DQ (TR54.7.5)	
83	Miguel Ángel Quispe	Peru	DQ (TR54.7.5)	
84	Rasulbek Dilmurodov	Uzbekistan	DQ (TR54.7.5)	
85	Matheus Correa	Brazil	DNS	

Team race
Rank	Team	Points
1st place, gold medalist(s)	Japan	20 pts
2nd place, silver medalist(s)	Spain	39 pts
3rd place, bronze medalist(s)	China	51 pts
4	Australia	55 pts
5	Italy	62 pts
6	Ecuador	67 pts
7	Brazil	96 pts
8	Mexico	99 pts
9	Colombia	112 pts
10	Peru	126 pts
11	India	126 pts
12	Ukraine	133 pts
13	United States	140 pts
14	Canada	174 pts
15	New Zealand	197 pts

== Senior Women Half-Marathon ==
Individual race
Rank	Athlete	Country	Time (m:s)	Notes
1st place, gold medalist(s)	Kimberly García	Peru	1:35:00	CR
2nd place, silver medalist(s)	Alejandra Ortega	Mexico	1:35:21	PB
3rd place, bronze medalist(s)	Aldara Meilán	Spain	1:35:38	
4	Sofia Santacreu	Spain	1:36:02	
5	Rebecca Henderson	Australia	1:37:05	
6	Evelyn Inga	Peru	1:37:08	
7	Hanna Shevchuk	Ukraine	1:37:39	
8	Lyudmila Olyanovska	Ukraine	1:37:54	SB
9	Nicole Colombi	Italy	1:38:00	SB
10	Mariia Sakharuk	Ukraine	1:38:15	
11	Elizabeth McMillen	Australia	1:38:29	PB
12	Clémence Beretta	France	1:38:48	PB
13	Lauren Harris	United States	1:39:28	NR
14	Olivia Sandery	Australia	1:39:50	
15	Haiying Ji	China	1:39:55	
16	Pauline Stey	France	1:39:59	
17	Katarzyna Zdziebło	Poland	1:40:16	NR
18	Maocuo Dou	China	1:40:17	
19	Karla Ximena Serrano	Mexico	1:40:22	PB
20	Camille Moutard	France	1:40:39	
21	Lidia Sanchez-Puebla	Spain	1:41:09	
22	Meryem Bekmez	Turkey	1:41:30	PB
23	Antia Chamosa	Spain	1:41:38	
24	Ruby Segura	Colombia	1:41:55	NR
25	Michelle Cantò	Italy	1:42:16	
26	Hana Černá	Slovakia	1:42:45	
27	Griselda Serret	Spain	1:42:52	
28	Jinlin Ning	China	1:42:57	
29	Ai Oyama	Japan	1:43:15	
30	Yadira Orihuela	Peru	1:43:29	
31	Na Guo	China	1:43:46	
32	Laura Chalarca	Colombia	1:43:49	
33	Ayane Yanai	Japan	1:44:14	
34	Nadia Lizeth Gonzalez Manjarrez	Mexico	1:44:18	
35	Ema Klimentová	Czech Republic	1:44:44	
36	Mary Luz Andía	Peru	1:44:46	
37	Xiaofan La	China	1:44:49	
38	Valeria Ortuño	Mexico	1:45:29	
39	Ravina	India	1:45:44	
40	Vitória Oliveira	Portugal	1:46:40	
41	Ana Delahaie	France	1:46:47	PB
42	Austėja Kavaliauskaitė	Lithuania	1:46:59	
43	Munita Prajapati	India	1:47:15	
44	Ayumi Sugibayashi	Japan	1:47:40	
45	Giulia Miconi	Italy	1:48:06	
46	Sharon Lisseth Herrera Soto	Costa Rica	1:49:16	
47	Allanah Pitcher	Australia	1:49:28	
48	Elisa Marini	Italy	1:50:07	
49	Vivian Castillo	Mexico	1:53:27	
50	Angela Castro	Bolivia	1:53:54	
51	María de los Ángeles Rodríguez	Ecuador	1:53:56	PB
52	Mansi Negi	India	1:54:12	
53	Silvia Jerono Kemboi	Kenya	1:54:36	PB
54	Izabelle Trefts	United States	1:54:42	
55	María Fernanda Peinado	Guatemala	1:55:07	
56	Bruna Batista de Oliveira	Brazil	1:56:19	
57	Maritza Rafaela Poncio Tzul	Guatemala	1:57:19	
58	Zelda Aletta Botha	South Africa	1:57:29	
59	Violine Intan Puspita	Indonesia	1:58:27	SB
60	Miranda Melville	United States	1:58:39	
61	Thaliane Janaina Miranda	Brazil	2:00:14	PB
62	Angelica Harris	United States	2:01:03	
63	Caren Naliaka Simiyu	Kenya	2:01:52	PB
64	Maria Luiza Jaime	Brazil	2:04:30	
65	Laryssa Fernanda Frois	Brazil		
—	Pietra Fernanda Ferreira Valério	Brazil		DNF
—	Natalia Pulido	Colombia		DNF
—	Halida Ulfah	Indonesia		DNF
—	Giulia Gabriele	Italy		DNF
—	Naum Jepkirui	Kenya		DNF
—	Rachelle De Orbeta	Puerto Rico		DNF
—	Kader Dost	Turkey		DNF
—	Yaquelin Mishell Teletor Jerónimo	Guatemala		DQ (TR54.7.5)
—	Abebu Ayalew	Ethiopia		DNS

Team race
Rank	Team	Points
1st place, gold medalist(s)	Ukraine	25 pts
2nd place, silver medalist(s)	Spain	28 pts
3rd place, bronze medalist(s)	Australia	30 pts
4	Peru	37 pts
5	France	48 pts
6	Mexico	55 pts
7	China	61 pts
8	Italy	79 pts
9	Japan	106 pts
10	United States	127 pts
11	India	134 pts
12	Brazil	181 pts

== Live Results and Video Recaps ==
World Athletics Race Walking Team Championships Brasilia, Brazil BRA: Brazil Sun Apr 12 Timing Website on World Athletics.

China secures minimal points for U20 10km gold - World Race Walking Team Championships Brasilia 26 from World Athletics

Katsuki leads Japan to marathon gold - World Race Walking Team Championships Brasilia 26 from World Athletics

Champions delight in Brasilia - Full Highlights - World Race Walking Team Championships Brasilia 26 from World Athletics

García León storms to gold once again - World Race Walking Team Championships Brasilia 26 from World Athletics

Fortunato stuns in Brasilia to claim gold - World Race Walking Team Championships Brasilia 26 from World Athletics
