= 2023 Asian Athletics Championships – Men's 20 kilometres walk =

Men's 20 kilometres walk at the 2023 Asian Athletics Championships
- Location: Bangkok, Thailand
- Dates: 14 July
- Competitors: 13 from 9 nations
- Winning time: 1:24:40

Medalists
gold medal	Yutaro Murayama	Japan
silver medal	Wang Kaihua	China
bronze medal	Vikash Singh	India

The men's 20 kilometres walk event at the 2023 Asian Athletics Championships was held on 16 July.

== Records ==
Records before the 2023 Asian Athletics Championships
Record	Athlete (nation)	Time (s)	Location	Date
World record	Yusuke Suzuki (JPN)	1:16:36	Nomi, Japan	15 March 2015
Asian record	Yusuke Suzuki (JPN)	1:16:36	Nomi, Japan	15 March 2015
Championship record	Han Yucheng (CHN)	1:21:11	Manila, Philippines	22 September 2003
World leading	Zhang Jun (CHN)	1:17:38	Taicang, China	8 April 2023
Asian leading	Zhang Jun (CHN)	1:17:38	Taicang, China	8 April 2023

== Results ==
Rank	Name	Nationality	Time	Notes
1st place, gold medalist(s)	Yutaro Murayama	Japan	1:24:40	
2nd place, silver medalist(s)	Wang Kaihua	China	1:25:29	
3rd place, bronze medalist(s)	Vikash Singh	India	1:29:32	
4	Zhang Jiaxu	China	1:31:08	
5	Georgiy Sheiko	Kazakhstan	1:31:26	
6	Hsu Chia-wei	Chinese Taipei	1:31:30	
7	Hendro	Indonesia	1:35:59	
8	Chin Man Kit	Hong Kong	1:36:40	
9	Athit Sriwichai	Thailand	1:42:51	
10	Natthanon Sukchum	Thailand	1:44:56	PB
11	Phyo Tun Pyae	Myanmar	1:45:47	
	Hiroto Jusho	Japan	DNF	
	Akshdeep Singh	India	DQ	
