= Suraj Panwar =

Indian racewalker

Suraj Panwar (born 2 April 2001) is an Indian athlete from Uttarakhand. He takes part in 20km race walk. He is selected to represent India in the 2024 Summer Olympics at Paris in 20 km marathon race walking mixed relay team along with Priyanka Goswami . He won a silver at the 2018 Summer Youth Olympics in men's 20 km race walk.

== Early life ==
Panwar is from Karbari Grant village, 15 km from Dehradun, Uttarakhand.

== Career ==
Panwar made the cut to the 2024 Summer Olympics in Paris through world rankings while three other Indian race walkers qualified after meeting the entry standard. Akshdeep Singh, Ram Baboo, Vikash Singh and Paramjeet Singh Bisht were the other Indian race walkers who qualified for the 2024 Olympics.
