= Athletics at the 2022 Asian Games – Men's 20 kilometres walk =

Men's 20 kilometres walk at the 2022 Asian Games
- Venue: Qiantang River Green Belt
- Date: 29 September 2023
- Competitors: 11 from 8 nations

Medalists
gold medal	Zhang Jun	China
silver medal	Wang Zhaozhao	China
bronze medal	Yutaro Murayama	Japan

The men's 20 kilometres walk competition at the 2022 Asian Games took place on 29 September 2023 at the Qiantang River Green Belt.

== Schedule ==
All times are China Standard Time (UTC+08:00)

Date	Time	Event
Friday, 29 September 2023	07:00	Final

== Records ==
Prior to this competition, the existing world, Asian and Games records were as follows.

World Record	Yusuke Suzuki (JPN)	1:16:36	Nomi, Japan	15 March 2015
Asian Record	Yusuke Suzuki (JPN)	1:16:36	Nomi, Japan	15 March 2015
Games Record	Wang Zhen (CHN)	1:19:45	Incheon, South Korea	28 September 2014

== Results ==
Legend

- DSQ — Disqualified

Rank	Athlete	Time	Notes
1st place, gold medalist(s)	Zhang Jun (CHN)	1:23:00	
2nd place, silver medalist(s)	Wang Zhaozhao (CHN)	1:24:08	
3rd place, bronze medalist(s)	Yutaro Murayama (JPN)	1:24:41	
4	Tomohiro Noda (JPN)	1:27:08	
5	Vikash Singh (IND)	1:27:33	
6	Choe Byeong-kwang (KOR)	1:29:18	
7	Hsu Chia-wei (TPE)	1:31:19	
8	Georgiy Sheiko (KAZ)	1:32:40	
9	Hendro (INA)	1:36:17	
10	Chin Man Kit (HKG)	1:37:43	
—	Sandeep Kumar (IND)	DSQ	
