= Serena di Fabio =

Italian athlete (born 2007)

Personal information
- Born: 23 November 2007 (age 18)

Sport
- Sport: Athletics
- Event: Race walking
Medal record
Women's athletics
Representing Italy
World U20 Championships
Gold medal – first place	2026 Eugene	5000 m walk
World Team Championships (U20)
Silver medal – second place	2026 Brasilia	10 km walk
Silver medal – second place	2026 Brasilia	10 km walk (team)
Bronze medal – third place	2024 Antalya	10 km walk (team)
European U20 Championships
Silver medal – second place	2025 Tampere	10,000 m walk
European U18 Championships
Gold medal – first place	2024 Banská Bystrica	5000 m walk

Serena di Fabio (born 23 November 2007) is an Italian race walker. She is the 2026 World U20 champion in the 5000 metres race walk.

== Biography ==
From Abruzzo, Di Santo won the gold medal at the 2024 European Athletics U18 Championships in Slovakia in the 5000 metres race walk.

In May 2025, she won the bronze medal in the women's U20 10,000m race at the European Race Walking Team Championships in the Czech Republic. Di Fabio won the silver medal behind Sofia Santacreu of Spain but ahead of another Spaniard, Aldara Meilán, at the 2025 European Athletics U20 Championships.

Having joined the Fiamme Azzurre, in February 2026, she set a new Italian junior record with a time of 12:40.77 in the 3000 m walk at the Italian Indoor Championships in Ancona. Di Fabio won the silver medal in the junior individual and team competitions at the 2026 World Athletics Race Walking Team Championships in Brazil, having completed the 10 km course in a time of 46:11. On 8 August 2026, she won the gold medal in the 5000 metres race walk at the 2026 World Athletics U20 Championships in Eugene, USA, with a time of 20:57.57, finishing ahead of Chloe Le Roch of France. She was nominated for European Athletics Women’s Rising Star for 2026.
