= Athletics at the 2026 Asian Games – Men's half marathon race walk =

Men's half marathon race walk at the 2026 Asian Games
- Venue: Aichi-Nagoya Race Walking Course, Aichi Prefecture
- Date: 23 September 2026
- Competitors: 9 from 6 nations
- Winning time: 1:23:32

Medalists
gold medal	Shi Shengji	China
silver medal	Toshikazu Yamanishi	Japan
bronze medal	Choe Byeong-gwang	South Korea

The men's half marathon race walk competition at the 2026 Asian Games took place on 23 September 2026 at the Aichi-Nagoya Race Walking Course in Aichi Prefecture, Japan.

It was the first time the half marathon race walk was contested at the Asian Games, having replaced the 20 km race walk on the programme. China's Shi Shengji won the gold medal in 1:23:32, Japan's Toshikazu Yamanishi took silver, and South Korea's Choe Byeong-gwang claimed bronze.

== Schedule ==
All times are Japan Standard Time (UTC+09:00)

Schedule
Date	Time	Event
23 September	07:30	Final

== Results ==
Key:	~ Red card for loss of contact	> Red card for bent knee

Place	Athlete	Nation	Time	Red cards	Notes
1st place, gold medalist(s)	Shi Shengji	China	1:23:32	~~	
2nd place, silver medalist(s)	Toshikazu Yamanishi	Japan	1:28:01	~~~	
3rd place, bronze medalist(s)	Choe Byeong-gwang	South Korea	1:28:35	~~	
4	Kento Yoshikawa	Japan	1:29:28	>>~	
5	Chin Man Kit	Hong Kong	1:34:26		
6	Lo Sheng-qin	Chinese Taipei	1:35:20	>	
7	Hendro Yap	Indonesia	1:36:49	~	
8	Chan Yung-kuei	Chinese Taipei	1:41:48	~~~	
—	Li Chenjie	China	DQ	~~~~	TR54.7.5
