= Olivia Sandery =

Australian athlete (born 2003)

Personal information
- Nationality: Australian
- Born: 22 January 2003 (age 23) Adelaide, Australia

Sport
- Sport: Athletics
- Event: Race walking
Medal record
Women's Athletics
Representing Australia
World Team Championships
Bronze medal – third place	2026 Brasilia	Half Marathon Team
World University Games
Silver medal – second place	2025 Bochum	20 km walk team

Olivia Sandery (born 22 January 2003) is an Australian race walker. She won the 10,000 m walk at the 2022–23 Australian Athletics Championships. In 2024, she won the national title over 35 km.

== Career ==
She is from South Australia and coached by Jarred Tallent. She set a 10 km personal best of 45:24 in January 2022. In March 2022, she won silver in the women's U20 10 km team walk at the 2022 World Athletics Race Walking Team Championships in Muscat, Oman. In May 2022, she finished third in the 35 km walk at the Oceania Open 35 km Race Walking Championships.

She finished fourth at the 2022 World Athletics U20 Championships in the women's 10,000 metres walk in Cali, Colombia. She set a personal best of 45:19.63 in the 10,000 m at Supernova #1 in January 2023, before setting a new South Australian record of 21:09.08 over 5000 m in March 2023.

She won the 10,000 m walk at the 2022–23 Australian Athletics Championships in Brisbane in 2023. She competed at the 2023 World Athletics Championships in the women's 20 kilometres walk in Budapest in August 2023.

In February 2024, she finished third at the Oceanian & Australian 20 km Race Walking Championships over 20 km. She competed at the 2024 Summer Olympics in the women's 20 kilometres walk. In December 2024, she set an Australian record time of 2:45:31 in winning the 35 km national race walking championship.

In July 2025, she placed fifth at the 2025 Summer World University Games in Bochum, Germany, in the women's 20 km road walk, winning the silver medal for Australia in the team competition. She was selected for the Australian team for the 2025 World Athletics Championships in Tokyo, Japan, placing 14th overall in the 35 km race walk.

In January 2026, she placed third behind Elizabeth McMillen and Rebecca Henderson in the Australian Athletics 10,000m Race Walking Championships.
