= 2025 Asian Athletics Championships – Men's 20 kilometres walk =

Men's 20 kilometres walk at the 2025 Asian Athletics Championships
- Location: Gumi, South Korea
- Dates: 27 May
- Competitors: 19 from 12 nations
- Winning time: 1:20:36 CR

Medalists
gold medal	Wang Zhaozhao	China
silver medal	Kento Yoshikawa	Japan
bronze medal	Servin Sebastian	India

The men's 20 kilometres walk event at the 2025 Asian Athletics Championships was held on 27 May.

== Records ==
Records before the 2025 Asian Athletics Championships
Record	Athlete (nation)	Time (s)	Location	Date
World record	Toshikazu Yamanishi (JPN)	1:16:10	Kobe, Japan	16 February 2025
Asian record	Toshikazu Yamanishi (JPN)	1:16:10	Kobe, Japan	16 February 2025
Championship record	Han Yucheng (CHN)	1:21:11	Manila, Philippines	22 September 2003
World leading	Toshikazu Yamanishi (JPN)	1:16:10	Kobe, Japan	16 February 2025
Asian leading	Toshikazu Yamanishi (JPN)	1:16:10	Kobe, Japan	16 February 2025

== Schedule ==
The event schedule, in local time (UTC+9), was as follows:

Date	Time	Round
27 May	08:00	Final

== Results ==
Place	Athlete	Nation	Time	Notes
1st place, gold medalist(s)	Wang Zhaozhao	China	1:20:37	CR
2nd place, silver medalist(s)	Kento Yoshikawa	Japan	1:20:46	
3rd place, bronze medalist(s)	Servin Sebastian	India	1:21:14	
4	Ryo Hamanishi	Japan	1:21:58	
5	Amit Khatri	India	1:22:15	
6	Zhang Jingrui	China	1:22:54	
7	Joo Hyun-myeong	South Korea	1:23:57	
8	Georgiy Sheiko	Kazakhstan	1:25:18	
9	Lim Dong-min	South Korea	1:27:54	
10	Chan Yung-kuei	Chinese Taipei	1:29:43	
11	Hendro Hendro	Indonesia	1:29:50	
12	Chin Man Kit	Hong Kong	1:30:55	
13	Hsu Chia-wei	Chinese Taipei	1:34:16	
14	Carlos de Imus	Philippines	1:35:28	
15	Naing Lin Tun	Myanmar	1:36:36	
16	Hong Khor Jing	Malaysia	1:37:05	
17	Pyae Phyo Tun	Myanmar	1:37:27	
—	Rasulbek Dilmurodov	Uzbekistan	DQ	
—	Choe Byeong-kwang	South Korea	DQ	
