= Athletics at the 2022 Asian Games – Mixed 35 kilometres walk team =

Mixed 35 kilometres walk team at the 2022 Asian Games
- Venue: Qiantang River Green Belt
- Date: 4 October 2023
- Competitors: 14 from 5 nations

Medalists
gold medal	China; Wang Qin, Qieyang Shijie, He Xianghong, Bai Xueying
silver medal	Japan; Subaru Ishida, Masumi Fuchise, Maika Yagi
bronze medal	India; Ram Baboo, Manju Rani

The mixed team 35 kilometres race walk competition at the 2022 Asian Games took place on 4 October 2023 at the Qiantang River Green Belt, Hangzhou.

Each team of could send a maximum of four athletes to the competition. The times of the first male and first female finished athletes of each team were counted to determine the team placing.

== Schedule ==
All times are China Standard Time (UTC+08:00)

Date	Time	Event
Wednesday, 4 October 2023	07:00	Final

== Results ==
Legend

- DNF — Did not finish

Rank	Team	Time	Notes
1st place, gold medalist(s)	China (CHN)	5:16:41	GR
M	He Xianghong	~~2:33:24~~	
M	Wang Qin	2:31:28	
W	Bai Xueying	~~2:48:13~~	
W	Qieyang Shijie	2:45:13	GR
2nd place, silver medalist(s)	Japan (JPN)	5:22:11	
M	Subaru Ishida	2:31:12	GR
M	Hayato Katsuki	~~DNF~~	
W	Masumi Fuchise	2:50:59	
W	Maika Yagi	~~2:59:52~~	
3rd place, bronze medalist(s)	India (IND)	5:51:14	
M	Ram Baboo	2:42:11	
W	Manju Rani	3:09:03	
4	Hong Kong (HKG)	5:57:04	
M	Chin Man Kit	2:52:45	
W	Ching Siu Nga	3:04:19	
5	Indonesia (INA)	6:22:06	
M	Hendro	2:53:36	
W	Violine Intan Puspita	3:28:30	
