= Akshdeep =

Akshdeep is a given name. Notable people with the name include:

- Akshdeep Singh (born 1999), Indian athlete
- Akshdeep Nath (born 1993), Indian cricketer
