= Athletics at the 2025 Summer World University Games – Women's 20 kilometres walk =

Women's 20 kilometres walk at the 2025 Summer World University Games
- Venue: Kemnader See
- Location: Bochum, Germany
- Dates: 27 July
- Competitors: 28 from 15 nations
- Winning time: 1:28:18 =GR

Medalists
gold medal	Elizabeth McMillen	Australia
silver medal	Ning Jinlin	China
bronze medal	Ji Haiying	China

The women's 20 kilometres walk event at the 2025 Summer World University Games was held in Bochum, Germany, at Kemnader See on 27 July.

== Results ==
=== Individual ===
Place	Athlete	Nation	Time	Notes
1st place, gold medalist(s)	Elizabeth McMillen	Australia	1:28:18	=GR
2nd place, silver medalist(s)	Ning Jinlin	China	1:28:32	PB
3rd place, bronze medalist(s)	Ji Haiying	China	1:29:14	
4	Meryem Bekmez	Turkey	1:30:00	SB
5	Olivia Sandery	Australia	1:30:16	
6	Yasmina Toxanbayeva	Kazakhstan	1:30:18	PB
7	Luo Yue	China	1:31:05	
8	Alexandra Griffin	Australia	1:32:46	
9	Ema Klimentová	Czech Republic	1:32:58	PB
10	Jekaterina Mirotvortseva	Estonia	1:33:04	
11	Tiziana Spiller	Hungary	1:33:18	PB
12	Hana Burzalová	Slovakia	1:34:03	
13	Allanah Pitcher	Australia	1:34:42	
14	Ayane Yanai	Japan	1:35:04	
15	Sejal Singh	India	1:35:21	PB
16	Valeriya Sholomitska	Ukraine	1:36:34	
17	Ada Junghannß	Germany	1:38:20	PB
18	Munita Prajapati	India	1:39:33	
19	Sumika Tani	Japan	1:40:37	
20	Mansi Negi	India	1:41:12	
21	Tabea Kiefer	Germany	1:41:20	
22	Sofía Ramos Rodríguez	Mexico	1:46:42	SB
23	Shalini	India	1:48:07	
24	Manuela Piñacela Tenesaca	Ecuador	1:49:12	PB
25	Mahima Choudhary	India	1:55:49	
—	Rebecca Henderson	Australia	DNF	
—	Maria Diana Lataretu	Romania	DNF	
—	Kader Dost	Turkey	DNF	

=== Team ===
Rank	Nation	Athletes	Time	Notes
1st place, gold medalist(s)	China	Ning Jinlin; Ji Haiying; Luo Yue	4:28:51	
2nd place, silver medalist(s)	Australia	Elizabeth McMillen; Olivia Sandery; Alexandra Griffin; Allanah Pitcher; Rebecca Henderson	4:31:20	
3rd place, bronze medalist(s)	India	Sejal Singh; Munita Prajapati; Mansi Negi; Shalini; Mahima Choudhary	4:56:06	
