= 2022 World Athletics U20 Championships – Women's 10,000 metres walk =

Women's 10,000 metres walk at the 2022 World Athletics U20 Championships
- Venue: Estadio Olímpico Pascual Guerrero
- Dates: 5 August
- Competitors: 41 from 30 nations
- Winning time: 46:24.35

Medalists
gold medal	Karla Serrano	Mexico
silver medal	Ai Ooyama	Japan
bronze medal	Ayane Yanai	Japan

The women's 10,000 metres race walk at the 2022 World Athletics U20 Championships was held at the Estadio Olímpico Pascual Guerrero in Cali, Colombia on 5 August 2022.

42 athletes from 30 countries entered to the competition, however only 41 of them competed. Heather Durrant, the third racewalker entered by the United States, did not compete since only two athletes per nation can compete in each event.

== Records ==
U20 standing records prior to the 2022 World Athletics U20 Championships were as follows:

Record	Athlete & Nationality	Mark	Location	Date
World U20 Record	Anežka Drahotová (CZE)	42:47.25	Eugene, United States	23 July 2014
Championship Record	Anežka Drahotová (CZE)	42:47.25	Eugene, United States	23 July 2014
World U20 Leading	Olivia Sandery (AUS)	45:24.1	Canberra, Australia	15 January 2022

== Results ==
The race will start at 8:30 on 5 August 2022. The results were as follows:

Rank	Name	Nationality	Time	Note
1st place, gold medalist(s)	Karla Serrano	Mexico	46:24.35	PB ~
2nd place, silver medalist(s)	Ai Ooyama	Japan	46:24.44	
3rd place, bronze medalist(s)	Ayane Yanai	Japan	46:43.07	
4	Olivia Sandery	Australia	47:37.85 (TR54.7.3)	~ ~ ~
5	Valeriya Sholomitska	Ukraine	47:40.67	
6	Lisbeth López	Guatemala	47:45.63	PB ~
7	Alanna Peart	Australia	47:47.55	PB
8	Giada Traina	Italy	47:48.78 (PZ60)	~ > ~
9	Lucía Redondo	Spain	48:00.50	
10	Natalia Pulido	Colombia	48:21.65	PB
11	Inês Mendes	Portugal	48:36.82	
12	Sharon Herrera	Costa Rica	48:54.61	
13	Olivia Lundman	Canada	48:54.71	~ ~
14	Margret Gati	Kenya	49:05.09	NU20R
15	Yaquelin Teletor	Guatemala	49:09.00	> >
16	Vittoria Di Dato	Italy	49:10.67	
17	Anastasia Antonopoulou	Greece	49:27.57	>
18	Emine Ceylan	Turkey	49:37.85	~
19	Magdalena Żelazna	Poland	49:54.33	>
20	Maysaa Boughdir	Tunisia	49:59.11	
21	Eva Rico	Spain	50:10.16	
22	Tiziana Spiller	Hungary	50:22.26	~ ~
23	Lena Sonntag	Germany	50:22.34	~
24	Elvina Carré	France	50:31.88	~ ~
25	Mariana Rincón	Colombia	50:35.99	~
26	Oumayma Hsouna	Tunisia	50:59.37	> ~
27	Maren Bekkestad	Norway	51:09.51	> >
28	Talia Green	United States	51:12.16	
29	Terézia Kurucová	Slovakia	51:56.94	
30	Gabrielly Santos	Brazil	52:02.35	
31	Sorana Tutu	Romania	52:08.92	PB
32	Mansi Negi	India	52:20.02	
33	Heta Veikkola	Finland	52:23.86	>
34	Angelica Harris	United States	52:32.40	
35	Lana Švarbić	Croatia	52:34.43	
36	Yasmina Toxanbaeva	Kazakhstan	53:06.76	PB
37	María José Mendoza	Ecuador	53:07.13	SB
38	Karin Devaldová	Slovakia	53:29.08	
39	Lilian Bittencourt	Brazil	54:19.10	~
40	Janise Nell	South Africa	56:56.62	~
	Rachana	India	DNF (PZ60)	~ > ~

Key:	~ Red card for loss of contact	> Red card for bent knee	PZ60: 60sec Penalty Zone	TR54.7.3: Failing to enter the Penalty Zone / leaving the Penalty Zone early
