= Athletics at the 2018 Summer Youth Olympics – Boys' 5000 metre walk =

Walk competition at 2018 Summer Youth Olympics

Boys' 5000 metre walk at the III Summer Youth Olympic Games
- Venue: Parque Polideportivo Roca
- Date: 11 and 15 October 2018
- Competitors: 16 from 16 nations

Medalists
1st place, gold medalist(s)		Óscar Patín	Ecuador
2nd place, silver medalist(s)		Suraj Panwar	India
3rd place, bronze medalist(s)		Jan Moreu	Puerto Rico

The Boys' 5000 metre walk competition at the 2018 Summer Youth Olympics was held on 11 and 15 October, at the Parque Polideportivo Roca.

== Schedule ==
All times are in local time (UTC-3).

Date	Time	Round
Thursday, 11 October 2018	14:30	Stage 1
Monday, 15 October 2018	14:30	Stage 2

== Results ==
=== Stage 1 ===
Rank	Athlete	Nation	Result	Notes
1	Óscar Patín	Ecuador	20:13.69	
2	Suraj Panwar	India	20:23.30	
3	Wang Xin	China	20:28.02	
4	Gilberto Menjívar	El Salvador	20:31.53	
5	César Córdova Fernández	Mexico	20:39.90	
6	Davide Finocchietti	Italy	20:51.96	
7	Jan Moreu	Puerto Rico	21:05.25	
8	Ľubomír Kubiš	Slovakia	21:10.94	
9	Özgür Topsakal	Turkey	21:23.99	
10	Yusuke Iwakawa	Japan	21:49.40	
11	Anthimos Kelepouris	Greece	21:58.74	
12	Said Khoufache	Algeria	22:00.00	
13	Kevin Cahuana	Peru	22:08.21	
14	Cristián Rojas	Colombia	22:18.17	
15	Lee Seong-yoon	South Korea	22:20.57	
	Bruno Lorenzett Nascimento	Brazil	DQ	

=== Stage 2 ===
Rank	Athlete	Nation	Result	Notes
1	Suraj Panwar	India	20:35.87	
2	Óscar Patín	Ecuador	20:38.17	
3	Jan Moreu	Puerto Rico	20:54.04	PB
4	Davide Finocchietti	Italy	21:41.62	
5	Ľubomír Kubiš	Slovakia	21:42.72	
6	Gilberto Menjívar	El Salvador	22:04.63	
7	Özgür Topsakal	Turkey	22:16.98	
8	Lee Seong-yoon	South Korea	22:29.41	
9	Cristián Rojas	Colombia	22:30.52	
10	Anthimos Kelepouris	Greece	22:42.50	
11	Kevin Cahuana	Peru	22:44.77	
12	Yusuke Iwakawa	Japan	23:20.84	
13	Marco Palumbo	Italy	23:24.93	
14	Said Khoufache	Algeria	23:39.49	
15	Bruno Lorenzett Nascimento	Brazil	27:21.77	
	César Córdova Fernández	Mexico	DQ	
	Wang Xin	China	DQ	

=== Final placing ===
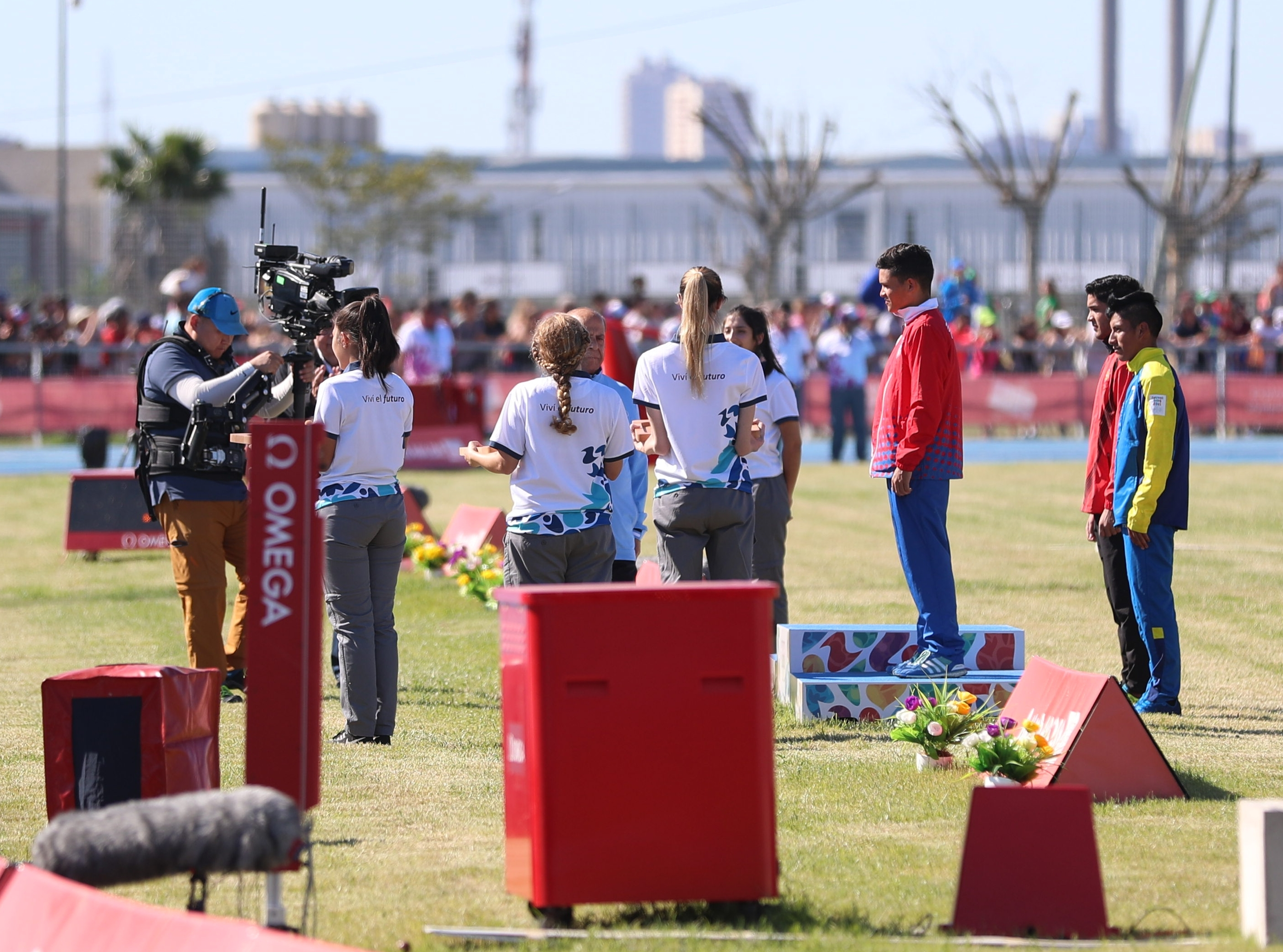
Victory ceremony of the Boys' 5000 metre walk

Rank	Athlete	Nation	Stage 1	Stage 2	Total
1st place, gold medalist(s)	Óscar Patín	Ecuador	20:13.69	20:38.17	40:51.86
2nd place, silver medalist(s)	Suraj Panwar	India	20:23.30	20:35.87	40:59.17
3rd place, bronze medalist(s)	Jan Moreu	Puerto Rico	21:05.25	20:54.04	41:59.29
4	Davide Finocchietti	Italy	20:51.96	21:41.62	42:33.58
5	Gilberto Menjívar	El Salvador	20:31.53	22:04.63	42:36.16
6	Ľubomír Kubiš	Slovakia	21:10.94	21:42.72	42:53.66
7	Özgür Topsakal	Turkey	21:23.99	22:16.98	43:40.97
8	Anthimos Kelepouris	Greece	21:58.74	22:42.50	44:41.24
9	Cristián Rojas	Colombia	22:18.17	22:30.52	44:48.69
10	Lee Seong-yoon	South Korea	22:20.57	22:29.41	44:49.98
11	Kevin Cahuana	Peru	22:08.21	22:44.77	44:52.98
12	Yusuke Iwakawa	Japan	21:49.40	23:20.84	45:10.24
13	Said Khoufache	Algeria	22:00.00	23:39.49	45:39.49
	Wang Xin	China	20:28.02	DQ	
	César Córdova Fernández	Mexico	20:39.90	DQ	
	Bruno Lorenzett Nascimento	Brazil	DQ	27:21.77	
