= Lidia Barcella =

Italian racewalker (born 1997)

Personal information
- National team: Italy
- Born: 21 April 1997 (age 29) Alzano Lombardo, Italy

Sport
- Sport: Athletics
- Event: Racewalking
- Club: Bracco Atletica
- Coached by: Renato Cortinovis

Achievements and titles
- Personal best: 35 km: 2:51:50 (2021)
Medal record
Representing Italy
Women's athletics
World Team Championships
Silver medal – second place	2026 Brasília	Marathon walk (team)
European Race Walking Team Championships
Silver medal – second place	2021 Poděbrady	35 km walk
Bronze medal – third place	2021 Poděbrady	35 km walk (team)

Lidia Barcella (born 21 April 1997) is an Italian racewalker who won an individual bronze medal at senior level at the 2021 European Race Walking Team Championships.

== See also ==
- Italy at the European Race Walking Cup
