= Athletics at the 2015 SEA Games – Men's 20 kilometres walk =

Men's 20 kilometres walk at the 2015 SEA Games
- Venue: East Coast Park
- Dates: June 6, 2015
- Competitors: 8 from 6 nations

Medalists
gold medal	Hendro Hendro	Indonesia
silver medal	Vo Xuan Vinh	Vietnam
bronze medal	Md Khairil Harith Harun	Malaysia

The Men's 20 Kilometres Walk event at the 2015 SEA Games was held at East Coast Park, Singapore on 6 June 2015.

== Schedule ==
All times are Singapore Standard Time (UTC+08:00)

Date	Time	Event
Saturday, 6 June 2015	16:00	Final

== Records ==
Prior to this competition, the existing Asian and Games records were as follows:

Asian Record	Suzuki Yusuke (JPN)	1:16:36	Nomi, Japan	15 March 2015
Games Record	Harbans Singh Narinde (MAS)	1:29:13	Jakarta, Indonesia	14 October 1997

== Results ==
Rank	Athlete	Time	Notes
1st place, gold medalist(s)	Hendro (INA)	1:34:23	
2nd place, silver medalist(s)	Vo Xuan Vinh (VIE)	1:38:38	
3rd place, bronze medalist(s)	Muhammad Khairil Harith Harun (MAS)	1:40:57	
4	Nguyen Thanh Ngung (VIE)	1:52:12	
5	Edmund Sim Soon Chye (SIN)	1:53:15	
	Chonduang Kittipong (THA)	–	DSQ
	Joel Koh Zhi Xuan (SIN)	–	DSQ
	Oo Kyaw Zaw (MYA)	–	DSQ
