= Riccardo Orsoni =

Italian athlete (born 2000)

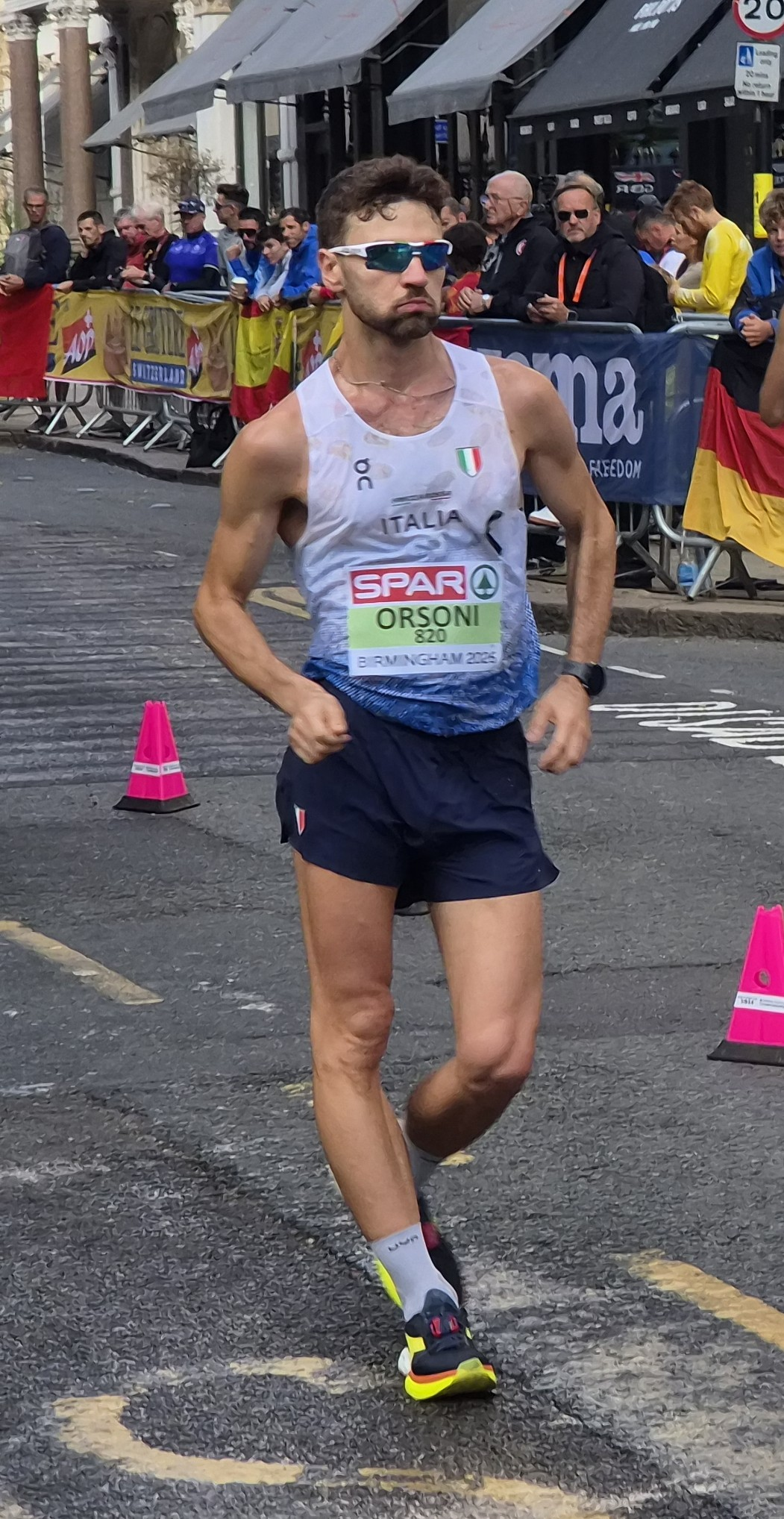
- 2026 European Championships

Personal information
- Born: 20 January 2000 (age 26)

Sport
- Sport: Athletics
- Event: Race Walking
Medal record
Men's athletics
Representing Italy
World Team Championships
Silver medal – second place	2026 Brasilia	Marathon walk (team)
Bronze medal – third place	2024 Antalya	20km walk (team)
European U20 Championships
Silver medal – second place	2019 Borås	10,000 m walk
European Race Walking Cup
Gold medal – first place	2019 Alytus	10 km race walk (U20)

Riccardo Orsoni (born 20 January 2000) is an Italian race walker.

== Biography ==
From Piàdena, in the province of Cremona, he competed for CUS Parma. In 2015 he began training with Roberto Cervi in Cremona where he also studied. From August 2017, he was coached by Alessandro Gandellini in Sesto San Giovanni (Milan). He became the first Italian junior to win the 2019 European Race Walking Cup in Lithuania. Orsoni also won the silver medal in the men's 10,000 kilometres race walk at the 2019 European Athletics U20 Championships in Sweden.

Orsoni placed seventh at the 2024 World Athletics Race Walking Team Championships in the men's 20km, winning the bronze medal with the Italian team. Orsoni placed eighth overall in the men's 35 kilometres race walk at the 2025 World Athletics Championships in Tokyo.

In March 2026, Orsoni won the inaugural Italian men’s half marathon race walk title. He also won the 10,000 metres race walk title at the 2026 Italian Championships in Florence. He won the silver medal with the Italian team at the 2026 World Athletics Race Walking Team Championships in Brazil.
