= 2026 World Athletics U20 Championships – Women's 5000 metres walk =

Women's 5000 metres walk at the 2026 World Athletics U20 Championships
- Venue: Hayward Field
- Dates: 8 August (Final)
- Competitors: 40 from 28 nations
- Winning time: 20:57.57 CR

Medalists
gold medal	Serena di Fabio	Italy
silver medal	Chloé Le Roch	France
bronze medal	Yang Yutong	China

The women's 5000 metres walk at the 2026 World Athletics U20 Championships was held at Hayward Field in Eugene, United States on 8 August 2026.

== Results ==
=== Final ===
The final took place in the morning session on 8 August 2026.

Key:	~ Red card for loss of contact	> Red card for bent knee

Place	Athlete	Nation	Time	Red cards	Notes
1st place, gold medalist(s)	Serena di Fabio	Italy	20:57.57		CR
2nd place, silver medalist(s)	Chloé Le Roch	France	21:17.92		NU20R
3rd place, bronze medalist(s)	Yang Yutong	China	21:31.99	~ ~	PB
4	Ibuki Hori	Japan	21:36.62	~	PB
5	Harumi Tabata	Japan	21:57.99	~	PB
6	Beatrice Palmonari	Italy	21:59.41	~ ~ ~	PB
7	Gina Torres	Spain	22:13.30	~ ~	PB
8	Veronika Tkachuk	Ukraine	22:25.39		PB
9	Natalia Mendiola	Mexico	22:27.54		PB
10	Aleksandra Zembrowska	Poland	22:28.20	~	PB
11	Dunja Eremić	Serbia	22:28.90	~	PB
12	Sun Xiaoxue	China	22:30.92		PB
13	Nelci Rojas	Bolivia	22:39.99		PB
14	Ipek Özkavlak	Turkey	22:53.04		PB
15	Zoe Woods	Australia	22:54.80		
16	Isabel Luis	Portugal	22:58.82	~	PB
17	Katherine Dayanna Barreto	Ecuador	22:58.99		PB
18	Matilde Angelico	Portugal	22:59.60		PB
19	Kwon Seo-Rhin	South Korea	23:02.39		PB
20	Naomi Luis	Mexico	23:15.38	~ ~ ~	
21	Sára Kata Alföldi	Hungary	23:20.13	~	PB
22	Chara Gerou	Greece	23:22.48	>	PB
23	Irene Vega	Spain	23:36.85		
24	Nika Helene Illing	Germany	23:37.35		PB
25	Margarita Storozhenko	Kazakhstan	23:40.75	~ ~	
26	Ella Rautawaara	Finland	23:40.88		
27	Petra Kusá	Slovakia	23:41.39	~	PB
28	Xiomara Orihuela	Peru	23:46.94		
29	Lison Charpentier	France	23:53.61		
30	Rim Slimi	Tunisia	23:58.32	>	
31	Marlen Staudacher	Austria	24:14.12		PB
32	María José González	Colombia	24:22.23		
33	Linda Nujić	Croatia	24:23.52		
34	Sophie Polkinghorne	Australia	24:26.15	>	
35	Kristína Zámečníková	Slovakia	24:34.81		
36	Danna Rivera	Colombia	24:44.39	~ ~ ~	
37	Grace Wagener	United States	25:39.29		
—	Aya Zenkhri	Algeria	DNF	> ~	
—	Andia Arotaipe Rocio	Peru	DNF		
—	Imen Saii	Tunisia	DSQ	~ ~ ~	TR54.7.3 & TR7.1
