= Maika Yagi =

Japanese race walker

Personal information
- Nationality: Japanese
- Born: 21 January 1999 (age 27)

Sport
- Sport: Athletics
- Event: Race walking
Medal record
Athletics
Asian Games
Silver medal – second place	2022 Hangzhou	Mixed 35 km walk team

Maika Yagi (矢来 舞香, Yagi Maika; born 21 January 1999) is a Japanese racewalking athlete. Representing Japan at the 2022 Asian Games, she won the silver medal at the mixed 35 kilometres walk team.

She competed in the women's 35 kilometres walk at the 2025 World Athletics Championships held in Tokyo, Japan.
