= Athletics at the 2013 SEA Games – Men's 20 kilometres walk =

The men's 20 kilometres walk at the 2013 SEA Games, the athletics were held in Naypyidaw, Myanmar. The track and field events are taking place at the Wunna Theikdi Stadiumon December 15.

== Schedule ==
All times are Myanmar Standard Time (UTC+06:30)

Date	Time	Event
Sunday, 15 December 2013	07:15	Final

== Records ==
Prior to this competition, the existing world, Asian, and Southeast Asian Games records were as follows.

World Record	Vladimir Kanaykin (RUS)	1:17:16	Saransk, Russia	29 September 2007
Asian Record	Wang Zhen (CHN)	1:17:36	Taicang, China	30 March 2012
Games Record	Harbans Singh Narinde (MAS)	1:29:13	Jakarta, Indonesia	14 October 1997

== Results ==
Legend

- DSQ — Disqualified

Rank	Athlete	Nation	Time	Notes
1st place, gold medalist(s)	Hendro Hendro	Indonesia (INA)	1:29:41	
2nd place, silver medalist(s)	Xuan Vinh Vo	Vietnam (VIE)	1:33:30	
3rd place, bronze medalist(s)	Myo Min Thiha	Myanmar (MYA)	1:36:18	
4	Kittiphong Chonduang	Thailand (THA)	1:37:03	
5	Choon Sieng Lo	Malaysia (MAS)	1:38:15	
6	Kyaw Zaw Oo	Myanmar (MYA)	1:41:19	
–	Muhammad Khairil Harith Harun	Malaysia (MAS)	–	DSQ
–	Thanh Ngung Nguyen	Vietnam (VIE)	–	DSQ
