= Rebecca Henderson (race walker) =

Australian racewalker

Personal information
- Born: 4 July 2001 (age 25) Dandenong, Victoria

Sport
- Country: Australia
- Sport: Athletics
- Event: Racewalking
- Club: Mentone Athletic Club
Medal record
Women's Athletics
Representing Australia
World Team Championships
Bronze medal – third place	2026 Brasilia	Half Marathon Team
Commonwealth Games
Bronze medal – third place	2026 Glasgow	10000 m walk
World University Games
Silver medal – second place	2025 Bochum	20 km walk team

Rebecca Henderson (born 4 July 2001) is an Australian racewalking athlete. She set a world record in the Marathon race walk in October 2026 in Takahata, Japan, with 3:14:52.

== Early years ==
Henderson joined the Berwick Little Athletics Centre at an early age. At the age of 10 she decided to give away the sprints and concentrate on the walks for her athletics career.

Henderson was always very bright at school and found it hard to juggle training with her studies. In 2019, she finished up dux of her school, Berwick College., In 2020 she began a Bachelor of Biomedical Science degree at Monash University.

== Achievements ==
Henderson came 16th over the 10 km distance in the 2018 World Race Walking Cup in China. In March 2021, she set PBs in 5 km and 10 km walks before making a 20 km debut in with a time of 1:32.12.

Henderson qualified to represent Australia at the 2020 Summer Olympics in Tokyo, competing in the women's 20 kilometres walk. Henderson came 38th with a time of 1:38.21, 10 seconds behind her compatriot, Katie Hayward. Her PB for 10 km is 46m.34 which has her in the Australian top-30.

At the 2024 Olympic Games in Paris, France, she placed 31st in 20km race walk and 22nd in mixed race walk team with Declan Tingay.

Henderson competed for Australia at the 2025 Summer World University Games in Bochum, Germany, in the women's 20 km road walk in July 2025. She represented Australia at the 2025 World Athletics Championships, where she placed ninth in the Women's 35 kilometres walk.

Henderson won the inaugural Australian half marathon race walk national title in 2026. In April 2026, she placed fifth in the individual race and won the bronze medal in the team event for Australia at the 2026 World Athletics Race Walking Team Championships in Brazil. On 1 August 2026, Henderson won the bronze medal at the 2026 Commonwealth Games in Glasgow, Scotland, as part of an Australian clean sweep of the medals in the 10,000 metres race walk alongside Jemima Montag and Elizabeth McMillen.

On 25 October 2026, Henderson set a world record in the Marathon race walk at the All Japan Race Walking meeting in Takahata, Japan, with 3:14:52. This time surpassed the previous record set by Sofia Fiorini at the European Championships in Birmingham in August, by 19 seconds.
