= Athletics at the 2026 Commonwealth Games – Women's 10,000 metres walk =

Women's 10,000 metres walk at the 2026 Commonwealth Games
- Venue: Scotstoun Stadium, Glasgow
- Dates: 1 August 2026 (final)
- Winning time: 42:13.40

Medalists
gold medal	Jemima Montag	Australia
silver medal	Elizabeth McMillen	Australia
bronze medal	Rebecca Henderson	Australia

The women's 10,000 metres walk at the 2026 Commonwealth Games, as part of the athletics programme, took place at the Scotstoun Stadium on 1 August 2026. The event was a straight final.

Jemima Montag of Australia returned to attempt to win a third consecutive race walk gold medal, being the reigning champion from both the first 10,000 metres track event from Birmingham 2022, and the 20 kilometre race walk at Gold Coast in 2018.

== Records ==
Prior to this competition, the existing world and Games records were as follows:

Women's 10,000 metres walk
World record	Nadezhda Ryashkina (URS)	41:56.23	Seattle, United States	24 July 1990
Commonwealth record	Kerry Saxby (AUS)	41:57.22	Seattle, United States	24 July 1990
Games record	Jemima Montag (AUS)	42:34.30	Birmingham, England	6 August 2022

== Schedule ==
The schedule was as follows:

Date	Time	Round
1 August 2026	18:30	Final

All times are United Kingdom time (UTC+1)

== Results ==
=== Final ===
The straight final of the women's 10,000 metres walk is scheduled for the evening of 1 August 2026.

Place	Athlete	Nation	Time	Notes
1st place, gold medalist(s)	Jemima Montag	Australia	42:13.40	
2nd place, silver medalist(s)	Elizabeth McMillen	Australia	42:39.87	
3rd place, bronze medalist(s)	Rebecca Henderson	Australia	43:27.46	
4	Priyanka Goswami	India	45:53.93	
5	Sylvia Jerono Kemboi	Kenya	51:30.80	
—	Ravina Gakiwad	India	DQ	TR54.7.5
