= Kumiko Okada =

Japanese race walker

Personal information
- Born: 17 October 1991 (age 34) Ageo, Saitama Prefecture, Japan
- Height: 158 cm (5 ft 2 in)
- Weight: 47 kg (104 lb)

Sport
- Country: Japan
- Sport: Track and field
Medal record
Women's athletics
Representing Japan
World Team Championships
Silver medal – second place	2024 Antalya	Marathon walk (mixed relay)
- Updated on 29 August 2015

Kumiko Okada (岡田 久美子, Okada Kumiko; born 17 October 1991) is a female racewalker from Japan. She competed in the women's 20 kilometres walk event at the 2015 World Championships in Athletics in Beijing, China.

She competed in the women's 20 kilometres walk at the 2022 World Athletics Championships held in Eugene, Oregon, United States.

== See also ==
- Japan at the 2015 World Championships in Athletics
