= Wang Kaihua =

Chinese racewalker (born 1994)

Wang Kaihua (born 16 February 1994) is a Chinese male racewalking athlete. He has represented his country at the IAAF World Race Walking Team Championships in 2016, where he helped China to the team gold, and at the 2017 World Championships in Athletics, where he finished in seventh place.

Born in Lanzhou, he took part in racewalking competitions as a youth and participated at the 2011 World Youth Championships in Athletics. He is coached by Italian Sandro Damilano. Moving into the senior ranks, he began to establish himself at the Taicang Race Walking Challenge, placing second to Chen Ding. Wang was ranked the number one in the world over the 20 kilometres race walk distance in the 2017 season, having set a personal best of 1:17:54 hours to win at the Chinese National Grand Prix. This moved him into the top five all time fastest Chinese at the event.

== International competitions ==
Year	Competition	Venue	Position	Event	Notes
2011	World Youth Championships	Lille, France	6th	10,000 m walk	
2016	World Race Walking Team Championships	Rome, Italy	13th	20 km walk	1:21:12
2016	World Race Walking Team Championships	Rome, Italy	1st	20 km walk	16 pts
2017	World Championships	London, United Kingdom	7th	20 km walk	1:19:30
2018	Asian Games	Jakarta, Indonesia	1st	20 km walk	1:22:04
2023	Asian Championships	Bangkok, Thailand	2nd	20 km walk	1:25:29
