= Wang Zhaozhao =

Chinese racewalker (born 1999)

Personal information
- Nationality: Chinese
- Born: 1 September 1999 (age 26)

Sport
- Sport: Athletics
- Event: Race Walking
Medal record
Men's athletics
Representing China
World Championships
Silver medal – second place	2025 Tokyo	20 km walk
Asian Championships
Gold medal – first place	2025 Gumi	20 km walk
Asian Games
Silver medal – second place	2022 Hangzhou	20 km walk

Wang Zhaozhao (born 1 September 1999) is a Chinese racewalker. He represented China at the 2024 Olympic Games.

== Career ==
In May 2025, he competed at the 2025 Asian Athletics Championships and won a gold medal in the 20 kilometres walk with an Asian Athletics Championships record time of 1:20:37. In September 2025, he competed at the 2025 World Athletics Championships and won a silver medal in the 20 kilometres walk.
