= Sofia Santacreu =

Spanish athlete (born 2006)

Personal information
- Nationality: Spanish
- Born: 7 February 2006 (age 20) Barcelona, Spain

Sport
- Country: Spain
- Sport: Athletics
- Event: Race walking
Medal record
Women's athletics
Representing Spain
World Team Championships (U20)
Gold medal – first place	2024 Antalya	10 km walk (team)
Bronze medal – third place	2024 Antalya	10 km walk
European U20 Championships
Gold medal – first place	2023 Jerusalem	10,000 m walk
Gold medal – first place	2025 Tampere	10,000 m walk
European U18 Championships
Gold medal – first place	2022 Jerusalem	5000 metres walk

Sofia Santacreu (born 7 February 2006) is a Spanish race walker and author. She has won European titles at U18 and U20 championships.

== Early life ==
She was born in Barcelona where she attended the French Lyceum, graduating in 2024. She started athletics at the age of 11 years-old after many years of ballet.

== Career ==
She was coached as a youngster by Sergio Ezquerro. In 2021, she broke the Spanish under-16 record for the 5000m race walk previously set by Mari Cruz Díaz. She won the gold medal in the 5000 metres race walk at the 2022 European Athletics U18 Championships in Jerusalem, Israel at the age of 16 years-old.

In July 2023, she broke the Spanish U18 5000m record set in 1992 by María Vasco, as she won the Spanish U18 title in Gijón. She won the gold medal in the 10,000 metres at the 2023 European Athletics U20 Championships in Jerusalem, Israel, despite being the third youngest of the 26 race walkers entered. She won with a time of 45:59.76, a new Spanish U20 record time.

She sustained an injury in her tibialis in November 2023 and her training regime was seriously hampered until March 2024 when she could resume full training. That month, she set a new personal best of 45:25 over 10 km in Valencia. The following month, she competed at the 2024 World Athletics Race Walking Team Championships in Antalya, winning bronze in the U20 race and gold in the team event. That year, Santacreu left her long-term coach Sergio Ezquerro and started training with Alejandro Aragoneses, coach to fellow Spanish race walker Paul McGrath. Competing for Joventut Atlètica Sabadell (JAS) she was second at the Spanish U20 championships in the 5 km walk in 22:37.39, 18 seconds behind the Galician Aldara Meilán who set a new championship record.

In May 2025, she won the women's U20 10,000m race at the European Race Walking Team Championships in the Czech Republic. In July 2025, at the Spanish under-20 championships she won the 5000m race walk in a lifetime best of 21:37.60. In August, she retained her title in the women’s 10,000m race walk at the 2025 European Athletics U20 Championships in Tampere, setting a national U20 record of 43:47.89. In September 2025, she was nominated for the European Athletics female rising star award.

In April, she won the silver medal in the team event having placed fourth, a place behind compatriot Aldara Meilán, in the individual women’s half marathon at the 2026 World Athletics Race Walking Team Championships in Brazil.

== Personal life ==
At the age of 14 years-old, she published a book Train with Sofía after a family friend proposed the idea for exercise charts for children admitted to the hospital. The profits of the book have been donated to several social causes.
