= Paula Milena Torres =

Ecuadoran racewalker

Personal information
- Nationality: Ecuadorian
- Born: 17 October 2000 (age 25) Cuenca, Ecuador

Sport
- Country: Ecuador
- Sport: Athletics
- Event: Race walking
Medal record
Representing Ecuador
Women's athletics
World Championships
Bronze medal – third place	2025 Tokyo	35 km walk
World Team Championships
Gold medal – first place	2026 Brasília	Marathon walk
Gold medal – first place	2026 Brasília	Marathon walk (team)
South American Championships
Silver medal – second place	2023 Sao Paulo	20,000 m walk
South American Race Walking Championships
Bronze medal – third place	2024 Recife	20 km walk
World Team Championships (U20)
Silver medal – second place	2018 Taicang	10 km walk (team)
South American U23 Championships
Gold medal – first place	2022 Cascavel	20,000 m walk

Paula Milena Torres (born 17 October 2000) is an Ecuadorian racewalker, 3rd at 2025 World Championships in 35 km race walk, and 9th at 2024 Summer Olympics in 20 km race walk.
