= Aldara Meilán =

Spanish athlete (born 2006)

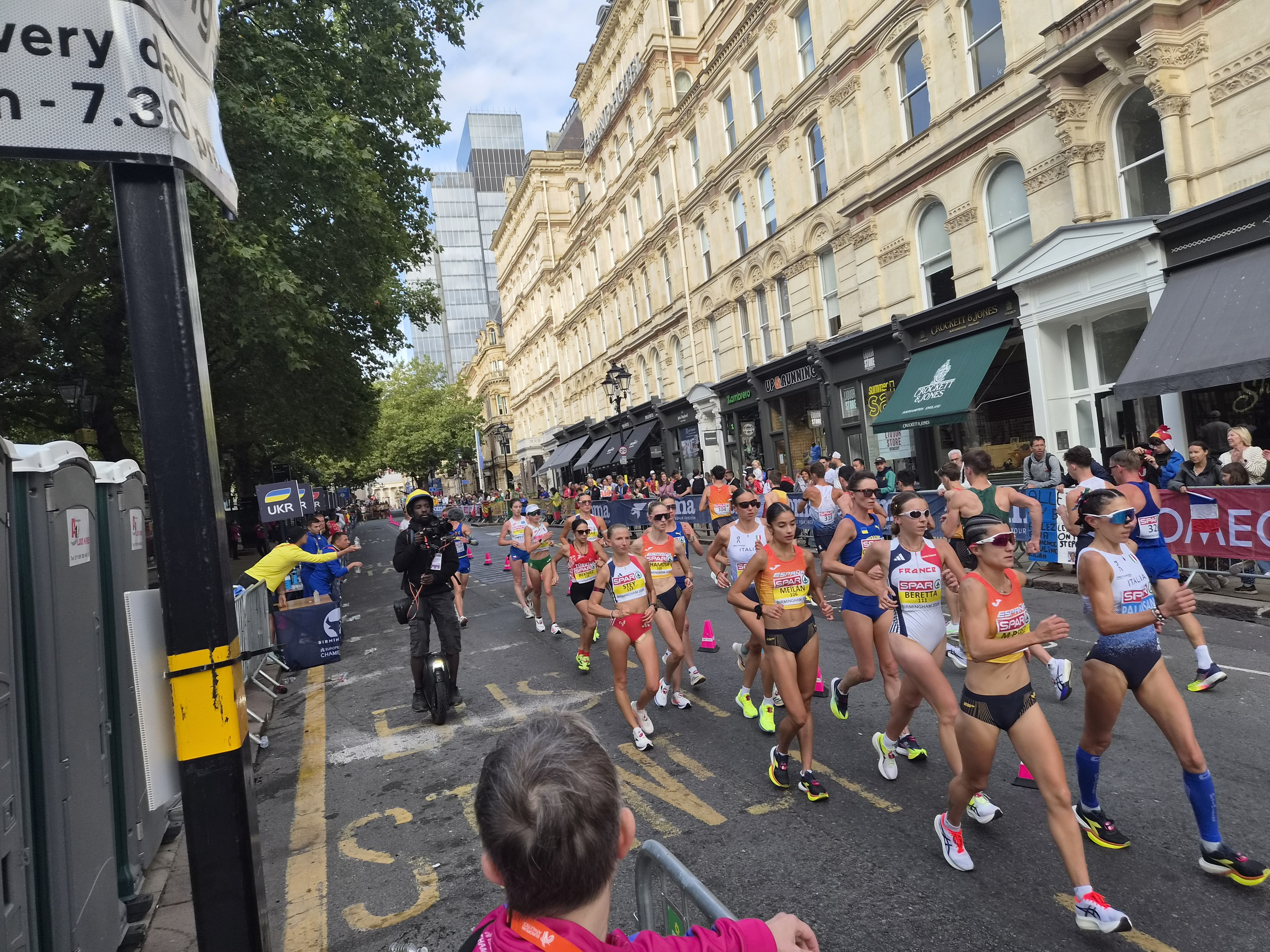
- Meilán in 2026

Personal information
- Born: 2 October 2006 (age 19) Lugo, Spain

Sport
- Sport: Athletics
- Event: Race Walking
Medal record
Women's athletics
Representing Spain
World Team Championships (U20)
Gold medal – first place	2024 Antalya	10 km walk (team)
Silver medal – second place	2024 Antalya	10 km walk
European U20 Championships
Bronze medal – third place	2025 Tampere	10,000 m walk
European Youth Olympic Festival
Silver medal – second place	2022 Banská Bystrica	5000 m walk

Aldara Meilán (born 2 October 2006) is a Spanish race walker.

== Biography ==
She is from Lugo, in Galicia. Coached by Javier Piñeiro, in 2022 she earned silver in the 5000m race walk at the 2022 European Youth Olympic Festival in Banská Bystrica, Slovakia. The following year, she finished second in the U20 10km at the European Race Walking Team Championships in Poděbrady.

She competed for Spain at the 2024 World Athletics Race Walking Team Championships in Antalya, winning the silver medal in the U20 race, and gold in the team event alongside Sofia Santacreu. She won the Spanish U20 championships in the 5km walk in 2024, setting a new championship record time. She was selected for the 2024 World Athletics U20 Championships in Lima, Peru.

In August, she won the bronze medal in a personal best of 44:15.89 in the women's 10,000m race walk at the 2025 European Athletics U20 Championships in Tampere.

In April 2026, she won the bronze medal in the individual women's half marathon and silver in the team event at the 2026 World Athletics Race Walking Team Championships in Brazil.
