= Hardeep =

Hardeep is a unisex given name. Notable people with the name include:

- Hardeep Singh Bawa, Indian 21st century politician
- Hardeep Singh Dang, Indian 21st century politician
- Hardeep Grewal, Canadian 21st century politician
- Hardeep Singh Kohli (born 1969), British presenter, comedian, writer, director and contestant on reality TV shows
- Hardeep Singh Mundian, Indian 21st century politician
- Hardeep Singh Nijjar (1977–2023), Canadian Sikh separatist who was assassinated
- Hardeep Singh Puri (born 1952), Indian Minister of Petroleum and Natural Gas and Minister of Housing and Urban Affairs
- Hardeep Singh (field hockey) (born 1960), Indian field hockey player
- Hardeep Singh (Jammu and Kashmir cricketer) (born 1981), Indian cricketer
- Hardeep Singh (Uttar Pradesh cricketer) (born 1995), Indian cricketer
- Hardeep Singh (wrestler) (born 1990), Indian Greco-Roman wrestler
