= Shi Shengji =

Chinese track and field athlete (born 2007)

Personal information
- Nationality: Chinese
- Born: 19 January 2007 (age 19)

Sport
- Sport: Athletics
- Event: Race walking
Medal record
Men's athletics
Representing China
Asian Games
| Gold medal – first place | 2026 Aichi–Nagoya | Half marathon |
World Team Championships
| Gold medal – first place | 2024 Antalya | 10 km team |
| Silver medal – second place | 2024 Antalya | 10 km walk |

Shi Shengji (Chinese: 石升吉; born 19 January 2007) is a Chinese race walker.

== Career ==
In April 2023, Shi competed at the 2024 World Athletics Race Walking Team Championships and won a gold medal in the 10 kilometer team event.

In March 2026, he competed at the Chinese Race Walking Grand Prix, the first World Athletics Race Walking Tour Gold meeting of 2026, and won a gold medal in the half marathon race walk with a time of 1:22.33. This was his first individual senior title.

In September 2026, he competed at the 2026 Asian Games and won a gold medal in the half marathon with a time of 1:23:32. The half-marathon race walk, contested over 21.0975 kilometers, made its Asian Games debut. It replaced the 20 kilometer race walk on the program following World Athletics' change to the standard senior road race walking distances this season. This was China's 200th gold medal in athletics at the Asian Games.
