= Maher Ben Hlima =

Polish racewalker (born 1989)

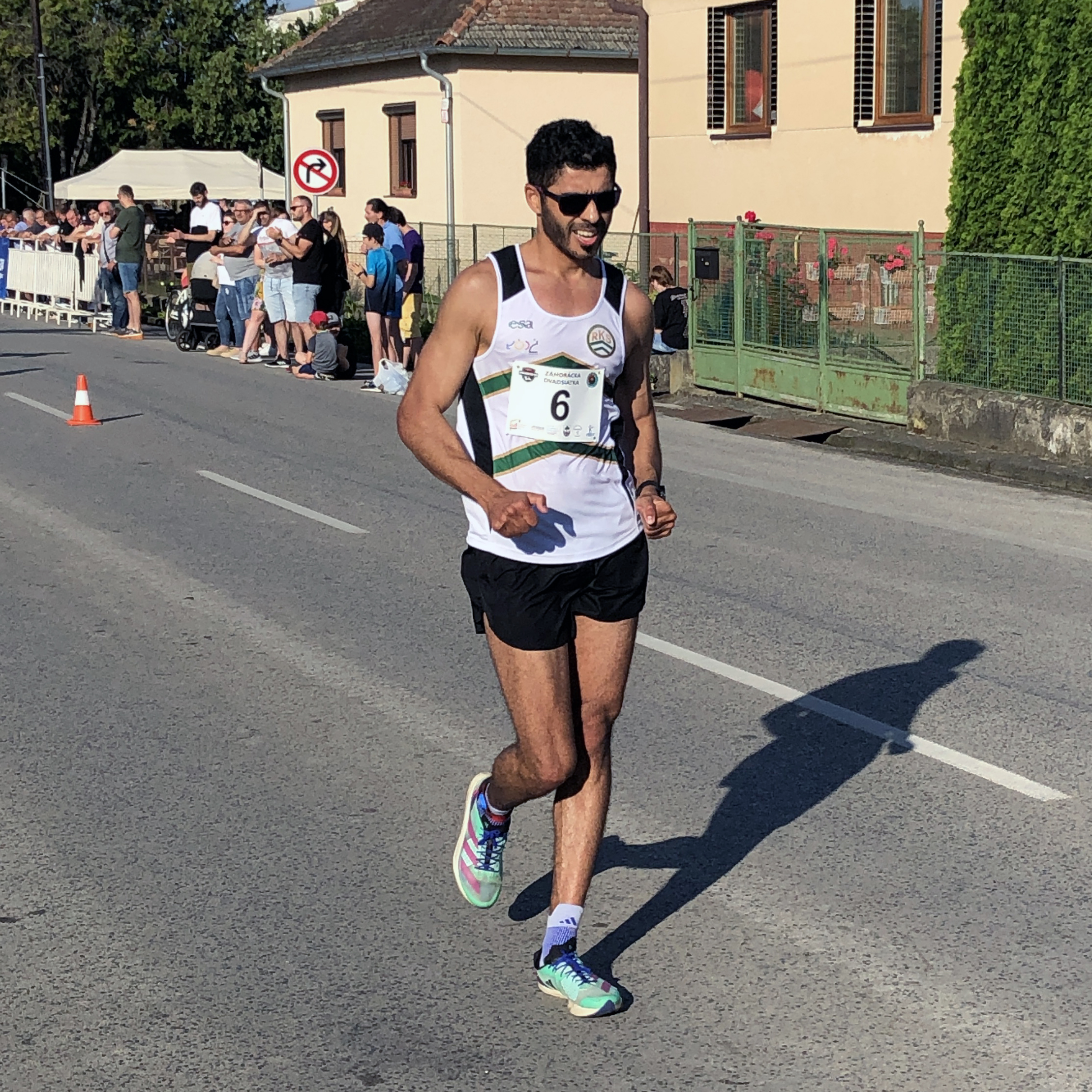
- Maher Ben Hlima at Záhorácka dvadsiatka 2023

Personal information
- Nationality: Poland / Tunisia
- Born: 24 July 1989 (age 36)

Sport
- Sport: Athletics
- Event: Racewalking
- Club: RKS Łódź
- Coached by: Andrzej Chylinski

Maher Ben Hlima (born 24 July 1989) is a Polish racewalker of Tunisian origin.

== Career ==
Maher Ben Hlima won the 2007 African Junior Championship in the 10,000 m walk, representing Tunisia. In 2008, he participated in the World Junior Athletics Championships in Bydgoszcz, Poland, over the same distance, where he failed to finish the race due to disqualification. He then interrupted his sports career and moved to Poland, where, among other things, he opened a transport company. In 2019 he obtained Polish citizenship, and in 2021 he returned to racing. Since 31 May 2023, he is eligible to represent Poland internationally.

In 2023, he won the Polish championship in the 10,000 m and silver medals in the 5000 m (indoor), 20 km and 35 km distances. At the 69th Janusz Kusociński Memorial, he set a Polish record in the 1-mile walk with a time of 5:35.49. In 2024 he won the title of Polish indoor champion at 5000 m, Polish vice-championship at 20 km and gold at 10,000 m. He also competed in the world team championships (29th place in team with Olga Chojecka) and the European 20 km championships (7th place).

He competed at the 2024 Summer Olympics in Paris, where he reached 29th place at the 20 km distance and 16th place in team with Olga Chojecka at the mixed relay marathon.

Since 2023 he has represented the RKS Lodz club (coach: Lech Krakowiak; before: Andrzej Chylinski), and earlier KS Ultra Team Lódz.

== Competition record ==
Year	Competition	Venue	Position	Event	Notes
Representing Tunisia
2007	African Junior Championships	Ouagadougou, Burkina Faso	1st	10,000 m	53:09.98
2008	World Junior Championships	Bydgoszcz, Poland	DSQ	10,000 m	DSQ
Representing Poland
2023	Polish Indoor Championships	Toruń, Poland	2nd	5000 m	20:33.44
2023	Polish Championships	Warsaw, Poland	2nd	20 km	1:25.01
2023	Polish Championships	Dudince, Slovakia	2nd	35 km	2:43.38
2023	Polish Championships	Gorzów Wielkopolski, Poland	1st	10,000 m	40:35.48
2024	Polish Indoor Championships	Wrocław, Poland	1st	5000 m	19:37.59
2024	World Race Walking Team Championships	Antalya, Turkey	29th	marathon, mixed relay (in team with Olga Chojecka)	3:07:31
2024	Polish Championships	Warsaw, Poland	2nd	20 km	1:23:28
2024	European Championships	Rome, Italy	7th	20 km	1:21:12
2024	Polish Championships	Bydgoszcz, Poland	1st	10,000 m	40:33.56
2024	Summer Olympics	Paris, France	29th	20 km	1:22:34
2024	Summer Olympics	Paris, France	16th	marathon, mixed relay (in team with Olga Chojecka)	3:00:55

== Personal bests ==
- 3000 m walk (indoors) – 10:45.60 (2025-02-08, Rzeszów)
- 5000 m walk – 19:35.90 (2023-05-13, Warsaw)
- 5000 m walk (indoors) – 18:47.63 (2025-02-22, Toruń)
- 10,000 m walk – 39:32.63 (2024-03-27, Warsaw)
- 10 km walk – 39:46 (2023-09-16, Druskieniki)
- 20 km walk – 1:20:06 (2024-05-18, A Coruña)
- 35 km walk – 2:27:51 (2025-03-22, Dudince)
- Mile walk – 5:35.49 (2023-06-04, Chorzów) – Polish national record
