= Bernardo Barrondo =

Guatemalan racewalker

Personal information
- Full name: Bernardo Uriel Barrondo García
- Nationality: Guatemalan
- Born: 5 June 1993 (age 33)

Sport
- Sport: Athletics
- Event: Racewalking

Bernardo Uriel Barrondo García (born 5 June 1993) is a Guatemalan racewalking athlete. He qualified to represent Guatemala at the 2020 Summer Olympics in Tokyo 2021, competing in men's 50 kilometres walk.
