= Chloé Le Roch =

French athlete (born 2007)

Personal information
- Born: 14 May 2007 (age 19)

Sport
- Sport: Athletics
- Event: Race walking
Medal record
Women's athletics
Representing France
World U20 Championships
Silver medal – second place	2026 Eugene	5000 m walk

Chloé Le Roch (born 14 May 2007) is a French race walker.

== Biography ==
From Saint Malo, Brittany, and a member of CJF Saint-Malo, Le Roch placed eighth in the 10,000 metres race walk at the 2024 World Athletics U20 Championships in Lima, Peru. In May 2025, she won the silver medal in the women's U20 10,000m race at the European Race Walking Team Championships in the Czech Republic.

In February 2026, she set a new French age-group record time at the French Race Walking and Combined Events Championships in Miramas and moved to third on the French all-time list in the 3,000m race walk with 12:34,64. She had first broken the French U20 record for the distance the year before. In July, she set a new French U20 record in the 5000 metres race walk, with 21:41.80 in winning the French under-20 title. On 8 August, Le Roch won the silver medal in the 5,000 metres race walk behind Serena di Fabio of Italy at the 2026 World Athletics U20 Championships in Eugene, USA, breaking her own French U20 record and setting a new French U23 record time of 21:17.92, also the second-fastest French performance of all time, behind Pauline Stey.
