= Paramjeet Singh Bisht =

Indian athlete

Paramjeet Singh Bisht (born 3 March 2002) is an Indian athlete from Uttarakhand. He takes part in 20km race walk. He is selected to represent India in the 2024 Summer Olympics at Paris.

== Career ==
Singh met the Olympic qualifying mark at the Asian 20 km Race Walking Championships by clocking 1:20:08 seconds on way to a bronze medal on 19 March 2023. The qualifying mark was 1hour, 20min, 10sec. Vikash Singh, who won the silver medal clocking 1:20:05, also crossed the qualifying mark and made it to the Olympics. The duo will take part in the 20 km race walk at the 2024 Summer Olympics in Paris. He is supported by OGQ.
