= Elizabeth McMillen =

Australian athlete (born 2004)

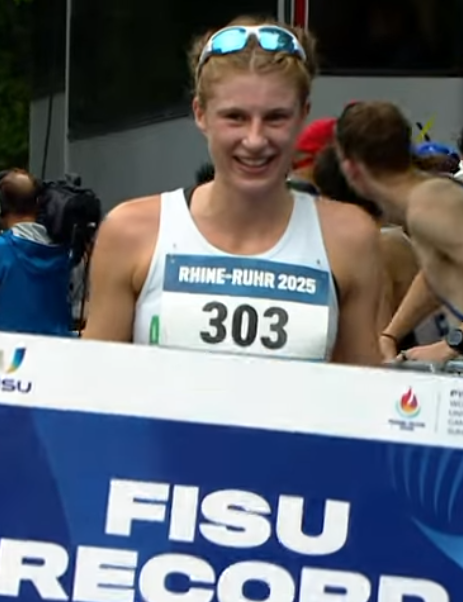
- At the 2025 Summer World University Games

Personal information
- Nationality: Australian
- Born: 10 April 2004 (age 22)

Sport
- Sport: Athletics
- Event: Race Walking

Achievements and titles
- Personal bests: 10 km 42:15.68 (Sydney, 2025); 20 km 1:28:10 (Bochum, 2025)
Medal record
Women's athletics
Representing Australia
World Team Championships
Bronze medal – third place	2026 Brasilia	Half Marathon Team
Commonwealth Games
Silver medal – second place	2026 Glasgow	10000 m walk
Summer World University Games
Gold medal – first place	2025 Bochum	20 km walk
Silver medal – second place	2025 Bochum	20 km team

Elizabeth McMillen (born 10 April 2004) is an Australian race walker. She won a gold medal at the 2025 Summer World University Games and the silver medal at the 2026 Commonwealth Games.

== Biography ==
McMillen started race walking at the age of 8 years-old, and was a multiple-time Australian national champion at age-group levels.

A member of New South Wales Institute of Sport (NSWIS) as a scholarship athlete, McMillen competed for Australia's at the 2024 World Athletics Race Walking Team Championships in Antalya, Türkiye.

McMillen won the gold medal competing at the 2025 Summer World University Games in Bochum, Germany, in the women's 20 km road walk in July 2025. She won the title in 1:28:18, a personal best time that equalled the 10-year-old Games record and also led the Australian team to a silver medal in the team competition behind China, for whom Ning Jinlin and Ji Haiying won silver and bronze individual medals. In September, she competed at the 2025 World Athletics Championships in Tokyo, placing 33rd overall in the 20 km race walk.

In January 2026, McMillen won the senior Australian Athletics 10,000m Race Walking Championships, gaining automatic selection for the 2026 Commonwealth Games.

On 1 August 2026, McMillen won the silver medal at the 2026 Commonwealth Games in Glasgow, Scotland, finishing runner-up as Australia completed a clean sweep of the medals in the 10,000 metres race walk. On 25 October 2026, McMillen set a half marathon race walk personal best to win at the All Japan Race Walking meeting in Takahata, Japan, with 1:31:30.
