= Manju Rani (athlete) =

Indian Track Athlete

Personal information
- Nationality: Indian

Sport
- Sport: Athletics
Medal record
Representing India
Asian Games
Bronze medal – third place	2022 Hangzhou	Mixed 35 km race walk

Manju Rani (born 22 March 1999) is an Indian track athlete. She won a bronze medal in the team 35 km race walk event at the 2022 Asian Games.
