= Servin Sebastian =

Indian racewalker (born 1999)

Personal information
- Born: 26 November 1999 (age 26) Edayathumangalam, Tamil Nadu, India
- Military career
- Branch: Indian Army
- Service years: 2018 - present
- Rank: Havildar

Sport
- Sport: Race walk
- Coached by: Ronald Weigel

Achievements and titles
- Personal best: 1:21:14
Medal record
Men's athletics
Representing India
Asian Championships
Bronze medal – third place	2025 Gumi	20km walk

Servin Sebastian (born 26 November 1999) is an Indian race walker. He won the bronze medal in 20 km walk event at the 2025 Asian Championships, by clocking his personal best. He missed out on a 2024 Paris Olympics berth despite qualifying, and ever since, he has improved on his personal best twice - at the 2025 National Games of India in Uttarakhand with a meet record, and at the 2025 Asian Championships where he won the bronze; he also won at the Indian open in Chandigarh in the interim.
