= Olivia Lundman =

Canadian racewalker

Olivia Thompson
Personal information
- Born: January 3, 2003 (age 23) Nanaimo, British Columbia, Canada
- Spouse: Andy Thompson (2026-Present)

Sport
- Country: Canada
- Sport: Athletics (race walking)
- Coached by: Evan Dunfee

Olivia Thompson (formerly Olivia Lundman), born January 3, 2003, is a Canadian track and field athlete competing in the racewalking events.

== Career ==
In March 2024, Lundman was named to Canada's team for the 2024 World Athletics Race Walking Team Championships in Antalya, Turkey. At the event, Lundman along with Evan Dunfee qualified for the 2024 Summer Olympics in the mixed racewalking relay event.

In July 2024, Lundman was officially named to Canada's 2024 Olympic team in the mixed racewalking team event.
