= Ram Baboo =

Indian race walker (born 1999)

Personal information
- Born: 20 March 1999 (age 27) Sonbhadra, Uttar Pradesh, India
- Military career
- Branch: Indian Army
- Service years: 2021–present
- Rank: Naib Subedar

Sport
- Sport: Athletics
- Event: 35 km race walk
- Coached by: Ronald Weigel

Achievements and titles
- Personal bests: 2:29:56 NR (2023)
Medal record
Men's athletics
Representing India
Asian Games
Bronze medal – third place	2022 Hangzhou	35km race walk mixed

Ram Baboo (born 20 March 1999) is an Indian race walker. He won a bronze medal in the 35 km race walk mixed event at the 2022 Asian Games. Baboo met the qualification standard for the 2024 Paris Olympics but did not secure a berth, finishing fourth among athletes from his country, which was restricted to three entries.

== Early life ==
Baboo was born in Bahuara village in Sonbhadra district, Uttar Pradesh. His achievement received widespread coverage as he was working as a daily wage labourer and a waiter at a hotel even as he was training for athletics. He did his schooling from Jawahar Navodaya Vidyalaya and did six months training at Major Dhyanchand Sports College, Saifai, eventually moving to Sports Authority of India, Bhopal for his training.
