= Ayane Yanai =

Japanese race walker

Personal information
- Nationality: Japanese
- Born: 24 December 2003 (age 22)

Sport
- Sport: Athletics
- Event: Race walking
Medal record
Athletics
Representing Japan
World Athletics U20 Championships
Bronze medal – third place	2022 Cali	10,000 metres walk

Ayane Yanai (柳井 綾音, Yanai Ayane; born 24 December 2003) is a Japanese racewalking athlete. Representing Japan at the 2022 World Athletics U20 Championships, she won the bronze medal at the women's 10,000 metres walk.

She competed in the women's 20 kilometres walk at the 2023 World Athletics Championships held in Budapest, Hungary.
