= Vikash Singh (race walker) =

Indian athlete

Vikash Singh (born 6 July 1996) is an Indian athlete from Delhi. He takes part in 20km race walk. He is selected to represent India in the 2024 Summer Olympics at Paris. He finished 30th at the Paris Olympics with a time of 1hour, 22min, 36 seconds.

== Early life ==
Singh is a Kerala-born athlete, settled in Delhi.

== Career ==
Singh met the Olympic qualifying mark at the Asian 20 km Race Walking Championships by clocking 1:20:05 seconds on way to a silver medal on 19 March 2023. The qualifying mark was 1hour, 20min, 10sec. Paramjeet, who won the bronze medal also crossed the qualifying mark and made it to the Olympics. The duo will take part in the 20 km race walk at the 2024 Summer Olympics in Paris.
