= Akshdeep Singh =

Indian racewalker (born 1999)

Personal information
- Full name: Akshdeep Singh Dhillon
- Born: 22 November 1999 (age 26) Barnala, Punjab, India
- Education: Punjabi University
- Military career
- Branch: Indian Navy
- Service years: 2022–present
- Rank: Petty officer

Sport
- Sport: Athletics
- Event: 20 km race walk

Achievements and titles
- Personal best: 1:19:37.56 NR (2024)
Medal record
Men's athletics
Representing India
Asian Race Walking Championships
Gold medal – first place	2023 Nomi	20km walk

Akshdeep Singh Dhillon (born 22 November 1999) is an Indian athlete who competes in the 20 km race walk event and holds the national record. Akshdeep represented India in the men's 20 km race walk event at the 2024 Paris Olympics.

== Career ==
In January 2022, Akshdeep won the inter-university gold in Moodbidri and the Khelo India University Games in May at Bengaluru. In October 2022, he won a silver medal at the National Open Athletics Championships at Sree Kanteerava Stadium in Bengaluru.

On 14 February 2023, he won the gold medal in the 20 km race walk at the Indian Race Walking Championships at Ranchi clocking 1:19:55. Later, on 19 March 2023, he took part in the 47th All Japan Race Walking Meet and finished 12th.

Akshdeep and Priyanka Goswami qualified for the 2024 Paris Olympics mixed marathon walk relay, finishing 18th in the World Race Walking Team Championship in Antalya, Turkey on 21 April 2024. The Indian duo clocked 3:05:03 to meet the qualifying mark. On 30 January 2024, he set the National record at the 11th National Race Walking Championships at Chandigarh clocking 1:19:37.56. At the 2024 Paris Olympics, Akshdeep logged a DNF (did not finish) in the men's 20 km race walk event.
