= Hendro =

Indonesian racewalker (born 1990)

Personal information
- Nationality: Indonesian
- Born: Yap Kim Lung; 24 October 1990 (age 35) Medan, North Sumatra, Indonesia

Sport
- Country: Indonesia
- Sport: Athletics
- Event: Racewalking
Medal record
Men's athletics
Representing Indonesia
SEA Games
Gold medal – first place	2013 Naypyidaw	20 km walk
Gold medal – first place	2015 Singapore	20 km walk
Gold medal – first place	2017 Kuala Lumpur	20 km walk
Gold medal – first place	2019 Philippines	20 km walk
Gold medal – first place	2023 Cambodia	20 km walk
Gold medal – first place	2025 Thailand	20 km walk
Silver medal – second place	2011 Jakarta–Palembang	20 km walk
Silver medal – second place	2021 Vietnam	20 km walk

Hendro (born Yap Kim Lung, 24 October 1990), commonly known as Hendro Yap, is an Indonesian race walker.

== Early life and education ==
Hendro was born in Medan, North Sumatra, on 24 October 1990, as the second child of five siblings to parents Yap Soen Peng and Melati. Due to financial constraints, Hendro started elementary school directly without attending kindergarten. After attending school in Medan until the third grade, Hendro moved to Cileungsi in the fourth grade. In the third year of middle school, in 2004, Hendro was advised by his parents to stop his education due to financial difficulties. However, under the guidance of his teacher, Hendro was encouraged to participate in race walking in hopes of joining the Student Sports Education and Training Center (PPLP). To be eligible for PPLP, candidates had to first perform well in the National Student Sports Week (Popnas). Hendro participated in Popnas in Medan, which also served as the selection for PPLP. He finished in fourth place and successfully gained admission to PPLP. In 2009, Hendro continued his studies in sports training at the Indonesia University of Education in Bandung through a scholarship.

== Career ==
While studying at the Indonesia University of Education in Bandung, Hendro was selected to join the national training camp for the 2011 SEA Games. Just days before the event, he came down with chickenpox but still competed, earning a silver medal in the 20-kilometer race walk. Over the next three editions of the SEA Games—2013, 2015, and 2017—Hendro went on to win gold medals in his event.

In the 20 km race walk at the 2017 SEA Games, Hendro not only took home the gold with a time of 1 hour, 32 minutes, and 11 seconds, but he also broke a long-standing 18-year-old SEA Games record held by Malaysia’s Harbans Singh Narinde, who had set the previous mark of 1 hour, 33 minutes, and 47 seconds at the 1999 SEA Games in Brunei.

At the 2019 SEA Games in the Philippines, Hendro successfully defended his title by winning another gold medal. However, his streak of golds came to an end at the 2021 SEA Games, held in 2022 in Vietnam, where he earned a silver medal. Hendro made a strong comeback at the 2023 SEA Games in Cambodia, securing another gold, and went on to repeat his success at the 2025 SEA Games in Thailand.
