= 2022 World Athletics Race Walking Team Championships =

- Organisers: World Athletics
- Edition: 29th
- Date: 4–5 March
- Host city: Muscat, Oman
- Events: 6
- Participation: 280 athletes from 40 nations

The 2022 World Athletics Race Walking Team Championships were the 29th edition of the global team racewalking competition organised by World Athletics.

== Overview ==
New 35 km senior men's and women's races were introduced, instead of the 50 km race. The rest of the programme was unchanged, with senior men's and women's races over 20 km and junior category events for both sexes over 10 km.

== Medal Summary ==
=== Men ===
Race	Gold		Silver		Bronze	
10 km (junior)	(China) Wang Hongren	44:06 SB	(Italy) Diego Giampaolo	44:14	(China) Zeng Yu	44:14 SB
10 km (team)	China; Wang Hongren; Zeng Yu	4 pts	Italy; Diego Giampaolo; Nicola Lomuscio	10 pts	Spain; Pablo Pastor; Óscar Martínez Rodríguez	13 pts
20 km	(Japan) Toshikazu Yamanishi	1:22:52 SB	(Japan) Koki Ikeda	1:23:29 SB	(Kenya) Samuel Gathimba	1:23:52 SB
20 km (team)	Ecuador; Brian Pintado; Jordy Jiménez; David Hurtado	25 pts	Japan; Toshikazu Yamanishi; Koki Ikeda; Motofumi Suwa	26 pts	China; Li Yandong; Niu Wenchao; Xu Hao	45 pts
35 km	(Sweden) Perseus Karlström	2:36:14 CR	(Spain) Álvaro Martín	2:36:54	(Spain) Miguel Ángel López	2:37:27
35 km (team)	Spain; Álvaro Martín; Miguel Ángel López; Marc Tur	16 pts	China; Lu Ning; Zhaxi Yangben; Wang Zhenhao	29 pts	Germany; Karl Junghannß; Christopher Linke; Nathaniel Seiler	48 pts

=== Women ===
Race	Gold		Silver		Bronze	
10 km (junior)	(China) Jiang Yunyan	47:48 SB	(China) Jiang Jinyan	48:03 SB	(Finland) Heta Veikkola	48:11 SB
10 km (team)	China; Jiang Yunyan; Jiang Jinyan	3 pts	Australia; Olivia Sandery; Allanah Pitcher	12 pts	Spain; Eva Rico Rufas; Lucía Redondo	20 pts
20 km	(China) Ma Zhenxia	1:30:22	(China) Yang Jiayu	1:31:54	(Peru) Kimberly García	1:32:27
20 km (team)	China; Ma Zhenxia; Yang Jiayu; Ma Li	10 pts	Greece; Antigoni Drisbioti; Kiriaki Filtisakou; Christina Papadopoulou	30 pts	India; Ravina; Bhawna Jat; Munita Prajapati	61 pts
35 km	(Ecuador) Glenda Morejón	2:48:33 CR	(China) Li Maocuo	2:50:26 NR	(Poland) Katarzyna Zdziebło	2:51:48 SB
35 km (team)	Ecuador; Glenda Morejón; Paola Pérez; Magaly Bonilla	12 pts	Spain; Laura García-Caro; Raquel González; María Juárez	28 pts	China; Li Maocuo; Ma Faying; Bai Xueying	29 pts

== Results ==
=== Men's 20 km ===
Rank	Name	Nationality	Time	Notes	Penalties
1st place, gold medalist(s)	Toshikazu Yamanishi	Japan	1:22:52	SB	
2nd place, silver medalist(s)	Koki Ikeda	Japan	1:23:29	SB	
3rd place, bronze medalist(s)	Samuel Gathimba	Kenya	1:23:52	SB	
4	Brian Pintado	Ecuador	1:24:35	SB	~ ~
5	Diego García	Spain	1:24:41		
6	Saul Mena	Mexico	1:25:14		~ ~
7	Wayne Snyman	South Africa	1:25:33	SB	~ ~
8	Noel Chama	Mexico	1:25:52		~
9	Jordy Jiménez	Ecuador	1:26:03		
10	Declan Tingay	Australia	1:26:05		~ ~ ~
11	Rhydian Cowley	Australia	1:26:09		~
12	David Hurtado	Ecuador	1:26:38	SB	~ ~
13	Sandeep Kumar	India	1:26:45	SB	~ ~ ~
14	Li Yandong	China	1:26:53		TR54.7.4
15	Niu Wenchao	China	1:27:01		~
16	Xu Hao	China	1:27:07		~ ~
17	Nils Brembach	Germany	1:27:10	SB	~
18	Quentin Rew	New Zealand	1:27:14		~ ~
19	Iván López	Spain	1:27:18		
20	Juan José Soto	Colombia	1:27:19	SB	
21	César Rodríguez	Peru	1:27:35		~ ~
22	Francesco Fortunato	Italy	1:27:44	SB	~
23	Motofumi Suwa	Japan	1:27:51		~ ~
24	Andrea Cosi	Italy	1:27:57		
25	Suraj Panwar	India	1:28:18	PB	
26	Will Thompson	Australia	1:28:30		
27	Leo Köpp	Germany	1:28:36	SB	~
28	Wang Zhaozhao	China	1:28:37		
29	Benjamin Thorne	Canada	1:28:42		
30	Cui Lihong	China	1:29:41		
31	José Manuel Pérez	Spain	1:29:48		~
32	Federico Tontodonati	Italy	1:29:58		~
33	Simon Wachira	Kenya	1:30:17	SB	~ >
34	Kyle Swan	Australia	1:30:33		~ ~
35	Mohamed Ragab	Egypt	1:30:56	SB	
36	Gianluca Picchiottino	Italy	1:31:33		
37	Paul McGrath	Spain	1:32:12		
38	Şahin Şenoduncu	Turkey	1:32:35		~ ~
39	Yohanis Algaw	Ethiopia	1:33:19	SB	
40	Cam Corbishley	United Kingdom	1:33:20	SB	~ ~ >
41	Johannes Frenzl	Germany	1:33:48	SB	
42	Abdulselam İmük	Turkey	1:35:18		~
43	Dominic Samson Ndigiti	Kenya	1:35:42	SB	
44	Rasulbek Dilmurodov	Uzbekistan	1:35:45	SB	>
45	Marius Cocioran	Romania	1:36:44		
46	Lucas Mazzo	Brazil	1:38:46		~ ~ ~
47	Samuel Allen	United States	1:39:07		>
48	Jordan Crawford	United States	1:39:15		
49	Tumisang Pule	South Africa	1:40:50		> > >
50	Mustafa Özbek	Turkey	1:41:07		
51	Tyler Wilson	Canada	1:42:47	PB	>
52	Sizwe Ndebele	South Africa	1:44:07		
53	Jerome Caprice	Mauritius	1:48:07	SB	
54	Aiman Sulaiman Tahbish Al Hashemi	Oman	2:16:58	NR	> >
55	Mohammed Al Baimani	Oman	2:18:35	PB	>
56	Osama Al Gheilani	Oman	2:25:03	PB	> > >
	Birara Alem	Ethiopia	DNF		>
	Alberto Amezcua	Spain	DNF		
	Éider Arévalo	Colombia	DNF		
	Tom Bosworth	United Kingdom	DNF		~
	Davide Finocchietti	Italy	DNF		
	Khalid Al Hashimi	Oman	DQ		> > > > TR54.7.5
	Hisham Al Jabri	Oman	DQ		> > > > TR54.7.5
	Matheus Corrêa	Brazil	DQ		~ ~ ~ ~ TR54.7.5
	Tyler Jones	Australia	DQ		~ ~ ~ ~ TR54.7.5
	AJ Gruttadauro	United States	DNS		

=== Team (Men 20 km) ===
Rank	Team	Points
1	Ecuador	25
2	Japan	26
3	China	45
4	Australia	47
5	Spain	55
6	Italy	78
7	Kenya	79
8	Germany	85
9	South Africa	108
10	Turkey	130
11	Oman	165

=== Women's 20 km ===
Rank	Name	Nationality	Time	Notes	Penalties
1st place, gold medalist(s)	Ma Zhenxia	China	1:30:22		
2nd place, silver medalist(s)	Yang Jiayu	China	1:31:54		
3rd place, bronze medalist(s)	Kimberly García	Peru	1:32:27		~
4	Alegna González	Mexico	1:32:45		
5	Nanako Fujii	Japan	1:33:16	SB	~
6	Antigoni Ntrismpioti	Greece	1:34:54	SB	>
7	Yang Liujing	China	1:34:59		~ ~
8	Saskia Feige	Germany	1:35:24	SB	~
9	Valentina Trapletti	Italy	1:36:44	SB	
10	Ma Li	China	1:37:19		~ ~
11	Kiriaki Filtisakou	Greece	1:38:53	SB	~
12	Lidia Sanchez-Puebla	Spain	1:39:42		
13	Christina Papadopoulou	Greece	1:40:01	SB	
14	Ravina	India	1:40:02	SB	~
15	Brigita Virbalytė-Dimšienė	Lithuania	1:40:15	SB	
16	Antia Chamosa	Spain	1:41:24		
17	Clémence Beretta	France	1:41:43	SB	
18	Bethan Davies	United Kingdom	1:42:25	SB	
19	Emily Wamusyi Ngii	Kenya	1:42:39	SB	~ ~
20	Kristina Morozova	Kazakhstan	1:42:45		>
21	Bhawna Jat	India	1:43:08	SB	~
22	Emilia Lehmeyer	Germany	1:43:18	SB	
23	Paula Milena Torres	Ecuador	1:43:46		
24	Gabriela de Sousa	Brazil	1:44:18	SB	
25	Olga Fiaska	Greece	1:44:54	SB	~
26	Munita Prajapati	India	1:45:03	PB	
27	Eliška Martínková	Czech Republic	1:45:26	SB	
28	Monika Vaiciukevičiūtė	Lithuania	1:45:44	SB	
29	Eloïse Terrec	France	1:45:49	SB	
30	Mihaela Acatrinei	Romania	1:46:11		
31	Hana Burzalová	Slovakia	1:46:51	SB	
32	Rachelle de Orbeta	Puerto Rico	1:46:54		~ ~ ~
33	Souad Azzi	Algeria	1:47:08		
34	Efstathia Kourkoutsaki	Greece	1:47:44	SB	
35	Anna Zdziebło	Poland	1:47:54	SB	
36	Enni Nurmi	Finland	1:49:06	SB	~
37	Robyn Stevens	United States	1:49:14	SB	~ ~
38	Regina Rykova	Kazakhstan	1:49:28	SB	
39	Austėja Kavaliauskaitė	Lithuania	1:50:04		>
40	Katie Burnett	United States	1:56:02		~
41	Marissa Swanepoel	South Africa	1:58:23		~
	Mary Luz Andía	Peru	DNF		
	Maria Diana Lataretu	Romania	DNF		>
	Sintayehu Masire	Ethiopia	DNF		
	Galina Yakusheva	Kazakhstan	DNF		
	Yehualeye Beletew	Ethiopia	DQ		~ ~ ~ ~ TR54.7.5
	Kader Dost	Turkey	DQ		~ ~ ~ > TR54.7.5
	Viviane Lyra	Brazil	DQ		~ ~ ~ ~ ~TR54.7.5
	Clara Smith	Australia	DQ		

=== Team (Women 20 km) ===
Rank	Team	Points
1	China	10
2	Greece	30
3	India	61
4	Lithuania	82

=== Men's 35 km ===
Rank	Name	Nationality	Time	Notes	Penalties
1st place, gold medalist(s)	Perseus Karlström	Sweden	2:36:14	CR	
2nd place, silver medalist(s)	Álvaro Martín	Spain	2:36:54		
3rd place, bronze medalist(s)	Miguel Ángel López	Spain	2:37:27		
4	Masatora Kawano	Japan	2:37:36	PB	>
5	Lu Ning	China	2:37:51	NR	>
6	Karl Junghannß	Germany	2:37:52	PB	~ >
7	Evan Dunfee	Canada	2:38:08	PB	~
8	Caio Bonfim	Brazil	2:38:20		
9	Zhaxi Yangben	China	2:38:53		
10	Kazuki Takahashi	Japan	2:39:08	PB	
11	Marc Tur	Spain	2:39:30	SB	> >
12	Aleksi Ojala	Finland	2:39:39	SB	~
13	Aurélien Quinion	France	2:40:19	SB	~
14	Matteo Giupponi	Italy	2:40:34		
15	Wang Zhenhao	China	2:40:46		>
16	Diego Pinzón	Colombia	2:41:07	PB	~ ~
17	Miroslav Úradník	Slovakia	2:41:30	SB	
18	Marius Žiūkas	Lithuania	2:41:32	PB	> >
19	Christopher Linke	Germany	2:42:01	PB	
20	Manuel Bermúdez	Spain	2:42:55		>
21	Vít Hlaváč	Czech Republic	2:43:14	PB	
22	He Xianghong	China	2:43:44		
23	Nathaniel Seiler	Germany	2:44:05	PB	~ ~
24	Jhonatan Javier Amores Carua	Ecuador	2:44:08		~
25	Carl Dohmann	Germany	2:44:09	PB	
26	Brendan Boyce	Ireland	2:44:25	SB	~
27	Eknath Sambhaji Turambekar	India	2:45:17	NR	
28	Michele Antonelli	Italy	2:46:32	SB	
29	Carl Gibbons	Australia	2:46:35	AR	
30	Artur Brzozowski	Poland	2:47:03	PB	>
31	Yassir Cabrera	Panama	2:47:25		
32	Dominik Černý	Slovakia	2:47:38	PB	
33	Luis Henry Campos	Peru	2:47:50		>
34	Jonathan Hilbert	Germany	2:47:52	PB	
35	Jakub Jelonek	Poland	2:47:55	SB	~ > ~
36	Gao Yingchao	China	2:47:58		
37	Álvaro López	Spain	2:49:31		
38	Chandan Singh	India	2:51:40	PB	
39	Riccardo Orsoni	Italy	2:51:56		
40	José Luis Doctor	Mexico	2:56:02		
41	Gonzalo Antonio Bustan Japon	Ecuador	2:58:04		~
42	Narcis Stefan Mihăilă	Romania	3:01:17	NR	
43	Hayato Katsuki	Japan	3:03:01	PB	
44	Bricyn Healey	United States	3:03:30	PB	
45	Dan Nehnevaj	United States	3:06:37		
46	Ram Baboo	India	3:07:14	SB	
47	Max Batista Goncalves dos Santos	Brazil	3:11:22		
48	Andrei Gafita	Romania	3:12:41	PB	
49	Diego Pereira Lima	Brazil	3:14:02		~ > >
50	Rudney Dias Nogueira	Brazil	3:17:58		>
51	Michael Giuseppe Mannozzi	United States	3:28:16		
	Mert Atlı	Turkey	DNF		>
	Rafał Augustyn	Poland	DNF		
	Stefano Chiesa	Italy	DNF		~ > >
	Andrés Chocho	Ecuador	DNF		~ ~
	Nick Christie	United States	DNF		
	Rui Coelho	Portugal	DNF		
	Ricardo Ortiz	Mexico	DNF		
	Ruslans Smolonskis	Latvia	DNF		~ > >
	Zakariya Al Baimani	Oman	DQ		> > > > > > TR54.7.5
	Al Sassan Al Hinai	Oman	DQ		> > > > > > TR54.7.5
	Abdul Hamid Al Nadabi	Oman	DQ		> > > > > > TR54.7.5
	Ismail Al Rahbi	Oman	DQ		> > > > TR54.7.5
	Osama Al Zakwani	Oman	DQ		> > > > TR54.7.5
	Dominic King	United Kingdom	DQ		> > > > TR54.7.5

=== Team (Men 35 km) ===
Rank	Team	Points
1	Spain	16
2	China	29
3	Germany	48
4	Japan	57
5	Italy	81
6	Brazil	104
7	India	111
8	United States	140

=== Women's 35 km ===
Rank	Name	Nationality	Time	Notes	Penalties
1st place, gold medalist(s)	Glenda Morejón	Ecuador	2:48:33	CR	
2nd place, silver medalist(s)	Li Maocuo	China	2:50:26	NR	
3rd place, bronze medalist(s)	Katarzyna Zdziebło	Poland	2:51:48	SB	~
4	Laura García-Caro	Spain	2:52:10		
5	Paola Pérez	Ecuador	2:53:58		
6	Magaly Beatriz Bonilla	Ecuador	2:54:39		~
7	Karla Jaramillo	Ecuador	2:56:14	PB	
8	Olga Chojecka	Poland	2:57:50	PB	
9	Johana Ordóñez	Ecuador	2:59:57		
10	Ma Faying	China	3:01:26		
11	Raquel González	Spain	3:02:44	SB	
12	Nicole Colombi	Italy	3:03:19		>
13	Mar Juárez	Spain	3:04:54		
14	Federica Curiazzi	Italy	3:05:22		
15	Cristina Montesinos	Spain	3:07:50		
16	Evelyn Inga	Peru	3:08:58		
17	Bai Xueying	China	3:10:19		
18	Lidia Barcella	Italy	3:11:07	SB	
19	Tereza Ďurdiaková	Czech Republic	3:12:21	SB	~
20	Priyanka Goswami	India	3:13:19	NR	~
21	Wu Quanming	China	3:14:00		
22	Sara Vitiello	Italy	3:14:57		
23	Ilse Guerrero	Mexico	3:15:59		
24	Mayara Luize Vicentainer	Brazil	3:19:18		
25	Vittoria Giordani	Italy	3:22:06		
26	Stephanie Casey	United States	3:23:10		>
27	Elianay Pereira	Brazil	3:35:59		
28	Na Guo	China	3:41:42		
29	Nair Da Rosa	Brazil	3:47:11		
	Carmen Escariz	Spain	DNF		
	Tiia Kuikka	Finland	DNF		> > >
	Inês Henriques	Portugal	DNF		
	Ana Veronica Rodean	Romania	DNF		
	Erin Taylor-Talcott	United States	DNF		> > >

=== Team (Women 35 km) ===
Rank	Team	Points
1	Ecuador	12
2	Spain	28
3	China	29
4	Italy	44
5	Brazil	80

=== Men's 10 km (Junior) ===
Rank	Name	Nationality	Time	Notes	Penalties
1st place, gold medalist(s)	Hongren Wang	China	44:06	SB	
2nd place, silver medalist(s)	Diego Giampaolo	Italy	44:14		
3rd place, bronze medalist(s)	Yu Zeng	China	44:14	SB	~ ~
4	Heristone Wanyonyi Wafula	Kenya	45:18	NU20R	~ ~ ~
5	Mateo Romero	Colombia	45:20		
6	Pablo Pastor	Spain	45:23		~
7	Oscar Martinez Rodriguez	Spain	45:25		~
8	Nicola Lomuscio	Italy	45:33		
9	Sajan Irincheev	Finland	45:54	SB	~ ~ ~ TR54.7.4
9	Pablo Rodriguez Rojas	Spain	45:54		
11	Mazlum Demir	Turkey	46:11		
12	Pietro Pio Notaristefano	Italy	46:13		
13	Adam Zajíček	Czech Republic	46:56	SB	
14	Andreas Papastergiou	Greece	47:22		
15	Fraser Saunder	Australia	47:38		
16	Frederick Weigel	Germany	47:47	SB	~ >
17	Tomáš Mencel	Slovakia	48:10	SB	~
18	Emanuel Apaza	Peru	48:18		
19	Jaime Ccanto	Peru	48:34		~
20	Julián Alfonso	Colombia	49:13		
21	Marcus Wakim	Australia	49:21		> >
22	Raivo Liniņš	Latvia	49:46	SB	
23	Kamil Piecuch	Poland	50:03	SB	~
24	Ignas Dumbliauskas	Lithuania	50:15	SB	
25	Michal Duda	Slovakia	50:24	SB	
26	Heron Rodrigues Miranda	Brazil	51:41		
27	Nurzat Kunbolatuly	Kazakhstan	52:00	SB	~
28	Hayrettin Yildiz	Turkey	52:28		>
29	Christiaan Bester	South Africa	55:43		> > >
30	Khalid Al Siyaby	Oman	1:00:31	NU20R	
31	Hamed Al Dughaishi	Oman	1:06:55	PB	
32	Mohammed Al Jabri	Oman	1:20:41	PB	
	Jaromír Morávek	Czech Republic	DNF		~ ~ ~
	Amit	India	DQ		~ ~ ~ ~ TR54.7.5
	Joao Victor Silva	Brazil	DQ		> ~ > > TR54.7.5

=== Team (Men's 10 km Junior) ===
Rank	Team	Points
1	China	4
2	Italy	10
3	Spain	13
4	Colombia	25
5	Australia	36
6	Peru	37
7	Turkey	39
8	Slovakia	42
9	Oman	61

=== Women's 10 km (Junior) ===
Rank	Name	Nationality	Time	Notes	Penalties
1st place, gold medalist(s)	Yunyan Jiang	China	47:48	SB	
2nd place, silver medalist(s)	Jinyan Jiang	China	48:03	SB	
3rd place, bronze medalist(s)	Heta Veikkola	Finland	48:11	SB	
4	Valeriya Sholomitska	Ukraine	48:53	SB	
5	Olivia Sandery	Australia	49:01		
6	Meiduo Gangla	China	49:40	SB	
7	Allanah Pitcher	Australia	49:51		
8	Eva Rico Rufas	Spain	50:02		~ ~
9	Yasmina Toxanbaeva	Kazakhstan	50:19	PB	
10	Vittoria Di Dato	Italy	50:20		~
11	Elvina Carré	France	50:26	SB	~
12	Lucia Redondo	Spain	50:41		~ ~ ~ TR54.7.4
13	Alanna Peart	Australia	50:47		
14	Mariana Rincón	Colombia	51:05		~ ~ ~
15	Olivia Lundman	Canada	51:13	PB	>
16	Inês Mendes	Portugal	51:29		
17	Griselda Serret Menendez	Spain	51:29		
18	Magdalena Żelazna	Poland	51:51	SB	>
19	Sofia Fiorini	Italy	52:08		>
20	Lena Sonntag	Germany	52:28	SB	
21	Maria Jose Mendoza	Ecuador	52:44		
22	Reshma Patel	India	53:10	SB	~ ~ ~
23	Ana Delahaie	France	53:20	SB	
24	Şükran Ayaz	Turkey	53:40		> > ~ TR54.7.4
25	Izabela Krzyżanowska	Poland	53:41	SB	
26	Janise Nell	South Africa	54:01		
27	Heather Durrant	United States	54:03		
28	Gabrielly Cristina Dos Santos	Brazil	54:21		
29	Lilian Dumes Bittencourt	Brazil	54:33		
30	Elif Nur Özbey	Turkey	55:48		~
31	Karin Devaldová	Slovakia	56:34		> > >
32	Sorana Tutu	Romania	56:42		
33	Ellen Seisto	Finland	57:33	SB	
34	Angelica Harris	United States	57:37		
35	Stanislava Hakulinová	Slovakia	57:45		
	Giada Traina	Italy	DNF		

=== Team (Women's 10 km Junior) ===
Rank	Team	Points
1	China	3
2	Australia	12
3	Spain	20
4	Italy	29
5	France	34
6	Finland	36
7	Poland	43
8	Turkey	54
9	Brazil	57
10	United States	61
11	Slovakia	66

== Medal table ==
=== Overall ===
Overall of the 12 events senior and junior (Men and Women).

* Host nation (Oman)

Rank	Nation	Gold	Silver	Bronze	Total
1	China (CHN)	6	4	3	13
2	Ecuador (ECU)	3	0	0	3
3	Spain (ESP)	1	2	3	6
4	Japan (JPN)	1	2	0	3
5	Sweden (SWE)	1	0	0	1
6	Italy (ITA)	0	2	0	2
7	Australia (AUS)	0	1	0	1
7	Greece (GRE)	0	1	0	1
9	Finland (FIN)	0	0	1	1
9	Germany (GER)	0	0	1	1
9	India (IND)	0	0	1	1
9	Kenya (KEN)	0	0	1	1
9	Peru (PER)	0	0	1	1
9	Poland (POL)	0	0	1	1
Totals (14 entries)		12	12	12	36

=== Senior ===
Men and Women's 4 events (individual and team)

* Host nation (Oman)

Rank	Nation	Gold	Silver	Bronze	Total
1	Ecuador (ECU)	3	0	0	3
2	China (CHN)	2	3	2	7
3	Spain (ESP)	1	2	1	4
4	Japan (JPN)	1	2	0	3
5	Sweden (SWE)	1	0	0	1
6	Greece (GRE)	0	1	0	1
7	Germany (GER)	0	0	1	1
7	India (IND)	0	0	1	1
7	Kenya (KEN)	0	0	1	1
7	Peru (PER)	0	0	1	1
7	Poland (POL)	0	0	1	1
Totals (11 entries)		8	8	8	24

=== Junior ===
Men and women's 4 events (individual and team)

* Host nation (Oman)

Rank	Nation	Gold	Silver	Bronze	Total
1	China (CHN)	4	1	1	6
2	Italy (ITA)	0	2	0	2
3	Australia (AUS)	0	1	0	1
4	Spain (ESP)	0	0	2	2
5	Finland (FIN)	0	0	1	1
Totals (5 entries)		4	4	4	12

== Participants ==
A total of 280 competitors from the national teams of the following 40 countries was registered to compete at 2022 World Athletics Race Walking Team Championships.

- Algeria (1)
- Australia (12)
- Brazil (15)
- Canada (4)
- China (24)
- Colombia (6)
- Ecuador (13)
- Egypt (1)
- Ethiopia (4)
- Finland (6)
- France (5)
- Germany (12)
- Great Britain (4)
- Greece (6)
- India (11)
- Ireland (1)
- Italy (21)
- Japan (7)
- Kazakhstan (5)
- Kenya (5)
- Latvia (2)
- Lithuania (5)
- Mauritius (1)
- Mexico (6)
- New Zealand (1)
- Oman (13)
- Panama (1)
- Peru (7)
- Poland (9)
- Portugal (3)
- Puerto Rico (1)
- Romania (7)
- Slovakia (7)
- South Africa (6)
- Spain (23)
- Sweden (1)
- Turkey (9)
- Ukraine (1)
- United States (13)
- Uzbekistan (1)
