= 2014 IAAF World Race Walking Cup =

- Organisers: IAAF
- Edition: 26th
- Date: 3–4 May
- Host city: Taicang, Jiangsu, China
- Events: 5
- Participation: 350 athletes from 48 nations

The 2014 IAAF World Race Walking Cup was held in Taicang, China, on 3–4 May 2014. The course was a 2 km loop along Shanghai Road between Banjing Road and Loujiang Road in the centre of the city. It has already been used for the annual IAAF World Race Walking Challenge event. Detailed reports on the event and an appraisal of the results was given for the IAAF.

Complete results were published for individuals and teams.

== Medallists ==
| Event | Gold | | Silver | | Bronze | |
|---|---|---|---|---|---|---|
Men
| Men's 20 km | Ruslan Dmytrenko (UKR) | 1:18:37 | Cai Zelin (CHN) | 1:18:52 | Andrey Ruzavin (RUS) | 1:18:59 |
| Men's 50 km | Mikhail Ryzhov (RUS) | 3:39:05 | Ivan Noskov (RUS) | 3:39:38 | Jared Tallent (AUS) | 3:42:48 |
| Men's 10 km (Junior) | Gao Wenkui (CHN) | 39:40 | Daisuke Matsunaga (JPN) | 39:45 | Nikolay Markov (RUS) | 39:55 |
Women
| Women's 20 km | Anisya Kirdyapkina (RUS) | 1:26:31 | Liu Hong (CHN) | 1:26:58 | Elmira Alembekova (RUS) | 1:27:02 |
| Women's 10 km (Junior) | Duan Dandan (CHN) | 43:05 | Yang Jiayu (CHN) | 43:37 | Anežka Drahotová (CZE) | 43:40 |
Team (Men)
| Men's 20 km | Ukraine | 18 pts | China | 23 pts | Japan | 35 pts |
| Men's 50 km | Russia | 7 pts | Ukraine | 22 pts | China | 37 pts |
| Men's 10 km (Junior) | China | 6 pts | Spain | 17 pts | Australia | 19 pts |
Team (Women)
| Women's 20 km | Russia | 8 pts | China | 22 pts | Portugal | 36 pts |
| Women's 10 km (Junior) | China | 3 pts | Spain | 13 pts | Australia | 20 pts |

== Results ==
=== Men's 20 km ===
| Place | Athlete | Country | Time | Notes |
|---|---|---|---|---|
| 1st place, gold medalist(s) | Ruslan Dmytrenko | Ukraine | 1:18:37 | NR |
| 2nd place, silver medalist(s) | Cai Zelin | China | 1:18:52 | SB |
| 3rd place, bronze medalist(s) | Andrey Ruzavin | Russia | 1:18:59 | SB |
| 4 | Yusuke Suzuki | Japan | 1:19:19 | |
| 5 | Miguel Ángel López | Spain | 1:19:21 | PB |
| 6 | Wang Zhen | China | 1:19:40 | SB |
| 7 | Ihor Hlavan | Ukraine | 1:19:59 | PB |
| 8 | Omar Segura | Mexico | 1:20:03 | PB |
| 9 | Eiki Takahashi | Japan | 1:20:04 | |
| 10 | Nazar Kovalenko | Ukraine | 1:20:11 | |
| 11 | Evan Dunfee | Canada | 1:20:13 | NR |
| 12 | Inaki Gomez | Canada | 1:20:18 | PB |
| 13 | Benjamin Thorne | Canada | 1:20:19 | PB |
| 14 | Dane Bird-Smith | Australia | 1:20:27 | PB |
| 15 | Chen Ding | China | 1:20:28 | SB |
| 16 | Caio Bonfim | Brazil | 1:20:28 | PB |
| 17 | Petr Trofimov | Russia | 1:20:33 | SB |
| 18 | Kim Hyunsub | South Korea | 1:20:39 | |
| 19 | Álvaro Martín | Spain | 1:20:39 | PB |
| 20 | Giorgio Rubino | Italy | 1:20:44 | SB |
| 21 | Yu Wei | China | 1:20:47 | SB |
| 22 | Takumi Saito | Japan | 1:20:51 | |
| 23 | Robert Heffernan | Ireland | 1:21:00 | |
| 24 | Kevin Campion | France | 1:21:07 | |
| 25 | Isamu Fujisawa | Japan | 1:21:07 | |
| 26 | Irfan Kolothum Thodi | India | 1:21:09 | SB |
| 27 | Gurmeet Singh | India | 1:21:20 | SB |
| 28 | Matej Tóth | Slovakia | 1:21:33 | |
| 29 | Mauricio Arteaga | Ecuador | 1:21:46 | PB |
| 30 | Denis Strelkov | Russia | 1:21:58 | |
| 31 | Julio César Salazar | Mexico | 1:21:58 | PB |
| 32 | José Leonardo Montaña | Colombia | 1:22:03 | PB |
| 33 | Singh Devender | India | 1:22:07 | PB |
| 34 | Marius Žiūkas | Lithuania | 1:22:09 | PB |
| 35 | Antón Kučmín | Slovakia | 1:22:12 | |
| 36 | Jesús Tadeo Vega | Mexico | 1:22:13 | PB |
| 37 | Alberto Amezcua | Spain | 1:22:19 | PB |
| 38 | Koichiro Morioka | Japan | 1:22:21 | |
| 39 | Antonin Boyez | France | 1:22:21 | PB |
| 40 | Ivan Trotski | Belarus | 1:22:24 | SB |
| 41 | Ganapathi Krishnan | India | 1:22:41 | PB |
| 42 | Marc Tur | Spain | 1:22:46 | PB |
| 43 | Tom Bosworth | Great Britain | 1:22:53 | |
| 44 | Pavel Parshin | Russia | 1:22:59 | |
| 45 | Bian Tongda | China | 1:23:00 | |
| 46 | Massimo Stano | Italy | 1:23:01 | PB |
| 47 | Dzmitry Dziubin | Belarus | 1:23:13 | PB |
| 48 | Basanta Bahadur Rana | India | 1:23:15 | |
| 49 | Georgiy Sheiko | Kazakhstan | 1:23:18 | |
| 50 | Choe Byeong Kwang | South Korea | 1:23:32 | |
| 51 | Marco De Luca | Italy | 1:23:34 | |
| 52 | Ivan Losev | Ukraine | 1:23:40 | |
| 53 | Rafał Fedaczyński | Poland | 1:23:41 | |
| 54 | Anatole Ibáñez | Sweden | 1:23:43 | SB |
| 55 | Łukasz Nowak | Poland | 1:23:48 | |
| 56 | Rafał Augustyn | Poland | 1:23:53 | |
| 57 | Rhydian Cowley | Australia | 1:23:58 | PB |
| 58 | Iván Garrido | Colombia | 1:23:58 | PB |
| 59 | Máté Helebrandt | Hungary | 1:24:03 | |
| 60 | Sérgio Vieira | Portugal | 1:24:13 | SB |
| 61 | Lebogang Shange | South Africa | 1:24:18 | |
| 62 | Grzegorz Sudoł | Poland | 1:24:29 | SB |
| 63 | Andrei Talashka | Belarus | 1:24:36 | SB |
| 64 | Adam Rutter | Australia | 1:24:44 | SB |
| 65 | Aurélien Quinion | France | 1:25:00 | PB |
| 66 | Håvard Haukenes | Norway | 1:25:06 | PB |
| 67 | Igor Liaschenko | Ukraine | 1:25:23 | |
| 68 | Marco Antonio Rodríguez | Bolivia | 1:25:42 | SB |
| 69 | Vito Minei | Italy | 1:25:51 | PB |
| 70 | Francesco Fortunato | Italy | 1:25:57 | PB |
| 71 | Wayne Snyman | South Africa | 1:26:03 | PB |
| 72 | Mohamed Ragab | Egypt | 1:26:10 | NR |
| 73 | Dušan Majdán | Slovakia | 1:26:12 | |
| 74 | Patrik Spevák | Slovakia | 1:26:14 | PB |
| 75 | Genadij Kozlovskij | Lithuania | 1:26:41 | |
| 76 | Rafał Sikora | Poland | 1:26:49 | |
| 77 | Brendan Boyce | Ireland | 1:26:55 | |
| 78 | Moacir Zimmermann | Brazil | 1:27:16 | SB |
| 79 | Şahin Şenoduncu | Turkey | 1:27:32 | PB |
| 80 | Luke Hickey | Ireland | 1:27:51 | PB |
| 81 | Joakim Saelen | Norway | 1:28:05 | PB |
| 82 | Benjamín Sánchez | Spain | 1:28:26 | |
| 83 | Miguel Carvalho | Portugal | 1:28:41 | PB |
| 84 | Cian McManamon | Ireland | 1:28:51 | SB |
| 85 | Anders Hansson | Sweden | 1:28:57 | PB |
| 86 | Mert Atlı | Turkey | 1:29:20 | PB |
| 87 | Gabriel Calvo | Costa Rica | 1:29:21 | PB |
| 88 | Hendro Hendro | Indonesia | 1:29:24 | NR |
| 89 | Alejandro Chavez | United States | 1:29:47 | |
| 90 | Emerson Esnal Hernández | El Salvador | 1:29:57 | SB |
| 91 | Nicholas Christie | United States | 1:32:19 | |
| 92 | Ozan Pamuk | Turkey | 1:32:36 | |
| 93 | Bruno Carrière | Canada | 1:33:08 | PB |
| 94 | Adrian Ionut Dragomir | Romania | 1:33:26 | PB |
| 95 | Muhammad Harun | Malaysia | 1:33:31 | PB |
| 96 | Michael Mannozzi | United States | 1:35:36 | |
| 97 | Tse Chun Hung | Hong Kong | 1:39:15 | |
| 98 | Eswaran Rajan Deren | Malaysia | 1:39:21 | PB |
| 99 | Edmund Sim | Singapore | 1:40:11 | |
| 100 | Mukhiddin Fakhritdinov | Tajikistan | 1:41:27 | PB |
| — | José Alessandro Bagio | Brazil | DNF | |
| — | Diego Flores | Mexico | DNF | |
| — | Erik Tysse | Norway | DNF | |
| — | João Vieira | Portugal | DNF | |
| — | Yerko Araya | Chile | DQ | 230.6(a) |
| — | Éider Arévalo | Colombia | DQ | 230.6(a) |
| — | Érick Barrondo | Guatemala | DQ | 230.6(a) |
| — | Creighton Connolly | Canada | DQ | 230.6(a) |
| — | Alejandro Francisco Florez | Switzerland | DQ | 230.6(a) |
| — | Andreas Gustafsson | Sweden | DQ | 230.6(a) |
| — | Aleksandr Ivanov | Russia | DQ | 230.6(a) |
| — | Stanislav Tanchev | Bulgaria | DQ | 230.6(a) |
| — | Perseus Karlström | Sweden | DNS | |

IAAF Rule 230.6(a): repeated failure to comply with the definition of race walking

=== Team (Men 20 km) ===
| Place | Country | Points |
|---|---|---|
| 1 | Ukraine | 18 pts |
| 2 | China | 23 pts |
| 3 | Japan | 35 pts |
| 4 | Canada | 36 pts |
| 5 | Russia | 50 pts |
| 6 | Spain | 61 pts |
| 7 | Mexico | 75 pts |
| 8 | India | 86 pts |
| 9 | Italy | 117 pts |
| 10 | France | 128 pts |
| 11 | Australia | 135 pts |
| 12 | Slovakia | 136 pts |
| 13 | Belarus | 150 pts |
| 14 | Poland | 164 pts |
| 15 | Ireland | 180 pts |
| 16 | Turkey | 257 pts |
| 17 | United States | 276 pts |

=== Men's 50 km ===
| Place | Athlete | Country | Time | Notes |
|---|---|---|---|---|
| 1st place, gold medalist(s) | Mikhail Ryzhov | Russia | 3:39:05 | WL |
| 2nd place, silver medalist(s) | Ivan Noskov | Russia | 3:39:38 | PB |
| 3rd place, bronze medalist(s) | Jared Tallent | Australia | 3:42:48 | SB |
| 4 | Alexey Bartsaykin | Russia | 3:46:34 | PB |
| 5 | Oleksiy Kazanin | Ukraine | 3:47:01 | PB |
| 6 | Omar Zepeda | Mexico | 3:47:35 | PB |
| 7 | Zhang Lin | China | 3:48:49 | PB |
| 8 | Ivan Banzeruk | Ukraine | 3:49:00 | SB |
| 9 | Serhiy Budza | Ukraine | 3:49:25 | SB |
| 10 | Chris Erickson | Australia | 3:49:33 | PB |
| 11 | Rolando Saquipay | Ecuador | 3:50:19 | PB |
| 12 | Quentin Rew | New Zealand | 3:50:22 | PB |
| 13 | Ihor Saharuk | Ukraine | 3:50:49 | PB |
| 14 | Wu Qianlong | China | 3:50:51 | PB |
| 15 | Jonathan Cáceres | Ecuador | 3:50:52 | PB |
| 16 | Zhao Qi | China | 3:51:47 | PB |
| 17 | Andriy Hrechkovskyi | Ukraine | 3:51:48 | PB |
| 18 | José Leyver Ojeda | Mexico | 3:52:20 | |
| 19 | Jean-Jacques Nkouloukidi | Italy | 3:53:44 | SB |
| 20 | Jesús Ángel García | Spain | 3:55:38 | SB |
| 21 | Pedro Isidro | Portugal | 3:56:15 | PB |
| 22 | Sandeep Kumar | India | 3:56:22 | NR |
| 23 | Pavel Chihuán | Peru | 3:56:35 | NR |
| 24 | Park Chilsung | South Korea | 3:56:39 | SB |
| 25 | Francisco Arcilla | Spain | 3:58:00 | PB |
| 26 | Teodorico Caporaso | Italy | 3:58:44 | SB |
| 27 | Jorge Armando Ruiz | Colombia | 3:58:58 | PB |
| 28 | Mikel Odriozola | Spain | 3:59:03 | SB |
| 29 | Omar Sierra | Colombia | 3:59:08 | PB |
| 30 | He Yongqiang | China | 4:01:54 | SB |
| 31 | Manish Singh | India | 4:02:08 | PB |
| 32 | Marc Mundell | South Africa | 4:02:19 | SB |
| 33 | Luis Fernando López | Colombia | 4:05:14 | PB |
| 34 | Lukáš Gdula | Czech Republic | 4:05:19 | |
| 35 | Jiang Jie | China | 4:07:10 | PB |
| 36 | Surinder Singh | India | 4:09:17 | PB |
| 37 | Federico Tontodonati | Italy | 4:10:49 | |
| 38 | Cláudio Richardson dos Santos | Brazil | 4:10:56 | SB |
| 39 | Oh Sehan | South Korea | 4:12:33 | SB |
| 40 | Ronal Quispe | Bolivia | 4:15:05 | SB |
| 41 | Vitaliy Anichkin | Kazakhstan | 4:16:44 | SB |
| 42 | Maniram Patel | India | 4:17:03 | |
| 43 | Angel Batz | Guatemala | 4:18:02 | PB |
| 44 | Jonathan Rieckmann | Brazil | 4:22:15 | SB |
| 45 | Patrick Stroupe | United States | 4:23:13 | SB |
| 46 | Mario Alfonso Bran | Guatemala | 4:26:07 | SB |
| 47 | Aníbal Paau | Guatemala | 4:36:44 | PB |
| — | Damian Błocki | Poland | DNF | |
| — | Xavier Le Coz | France | DNF | |
| — | Iván Pajuelo | Spain | DNF | |
| — | Allan Segura | Costa Rica | DNF | |
| — | Denis Asanov | Russia | DQ | 230.6(a) |
| — | Adrian Błocki | Poland | DQ | 230.6(a) |
| — | Andrés Chocho | Ecuador | DQ | 230.6(a) |
| — | Luis Manuel Corchete | Spain | DQ | 230.6(a) |
| — | Lorenzo Dessi | Italy | DQ | 230.6(a) |
| — | Luiz Felipe dos Santos | Brazil | DQ | 230.6(a) |
| — | Pavel Schrom | Czech Republic | DQ | 230.6(a) |
| — | Dávid Tokodi | Hungary | DQ | 230.6(a) |
| — | Yury Andronov | Russia | DQ | Doping |

IAAF Rule 230.6(a): repeated failure to comply with the definition of race walking

=== Team (Men 50 km) ===
| Place | Country | Points |
|---|---|---|
| 1st place, gold medalist(s) | Russia | 7 pts |
| 2nd place, silver medalist(s) | Ukraine | 22 pts |
| 3rd place, bronze medalist(s) | China | 37 pts |
| 4 | Spain | 763 pts |
| 5 | Italy | 82 pts |
| 6 | Colombia | 89 pts |
| 7 | India | 89 pts |
| 8 | Guatemala | 136 pts |

=== Men's 10 km (Junior) ===
| Place | Athlete | Country | Time | Notes |
|---|---|---|---|---|
| 1st place, gold medalist(s) | Gao Wenkui | China | 39:40 | CR |
| 2nd place, silver medalist(s) | Daisuke Matsunaga | Japan | 39:45 | NJR |
| 3rd place, bronze medalist(s) | Nikolay Markov | Russia | 39:55 | PB |
| 4 | Diego García | Spain | 40:10 | NJR |
| 5 | Jie Jinzhu | China | 40:46 | PB |
| 6 | Paolo Yurivilca | Peru | 40:47 | NJR |
| 7 | Nathan Brill | Australia | 41:07 | PB |
| 8 | Leng Xiao | China | 41:27 | SB |
| 9 | Ricardo Ortiz | Mexico | 41:33 | PB |
| 10 | Muratcan Karapınar | Turkey | 41:46 | NJR |
| 11 | José Luis Doctor | Mexico | 41:47 | PB |
| 12 | Jesse Osborne | Australia | 42:13 | |
| 13 | Manuel Bermúdez | Spain | 42:29 | |
| 14 | Mahmoud Abdelfattah | Egypt | 42:59 | NJR |
| 15 | Pablo Oliva | Spain | 43:03 | |
| 16 | Miroslav Úradník | Slovakia | 43:05 | |
| 17 | Jean Blancheteau | France | 43:10 | |
| 18 | Raouf Ben El Bahi | Tunisia | 43:23 | PB |
| 19 | Gregorio Angelini | Italy | 43:36 | PB |
| 20 | Daniele Todisco | Italy | 44:19 | |
| 21 | Yuki Kurumisawa | Japan | 44:27 | |
| 22 | Miguel Rodrigues | Portugal | 44:30 | PB |
| 23 | Martynas Jarusevicius | Lithuania | 44:30 | |
| 24 | Dmytro Sobchuk | Ukraine | 44:38 | |
| 25 | Andrii Vodvud | Ukraine | 44:39 | |
| 26 | Anton Radko | Ukraine | 44:46 | |
| 27 | Michal Morvay | Slovakia | 45:21 | |
| 28 | Ghassen Saidi | Tunisia | 45:29 | PB |
| 29 | Anthony Peters | United States | 45:54 | PB |
| 30 | Pierre Vermaak | South Africa | 45:54 | PB |
| 31 | Hélder dos Santos | Portugal | 46:05 | PB |
| 32 | Jonathon Lord | New Zealand | 47:58 | PB |
| 33 | Jared Free | New Zealand | 51:47 | |
| — | Alan Yamil Flores | Mexico | DQ | 230.6(a) |
| — | Brayan Fuentes | Colombia | DQ | 230.6(a) |
| — | Tyler Jones | Australia | DQ | 230.6(a) |
| — | Maxim Krasnov | Russia | DQ | 230.6(a) |
| — | Arturs Makars | Latvia | DQ | 230.6(a) |
| — | Brian Pintado | Ecuador | DQ | 230.6(a) |
| — | Denis Sergeev | Russia | DQ | 230.6(a) |
| — | Yanis Souaber | France | DQ | 230.6(a) |

IAAF Rule 230.6(a): repeated failure to comply with the definition of race walking

=== Team (Men 10 km Junior) ===
| Place | Country | Points |
|---|---|---|
| 1st place, gold medalist(s) | China | 6 pts |
| 2nd place, silver medalist(s) | Spain | 17 pts |
| 3rd place, bronze medalist(s) | Australia | 19 pts |
| 4 | Mexico | 20 pts |
| 5 | Japan | 23 pts |
| 6 | Italy | 39 pts |
| 7 | Slovakia | 43 pts |
| 8 | Tunisia | 46 pts |
| 9 | Ukraine | 49 pts |
| 10 | Portugal | 53 pts |
| 11 | New Zealand | 65 pts |

=== Women's 20 km ===
| Place | Athlete | Country | Time | Notes |
|---|---|---|---|---|
| 1st place, gold medalist(s) | Anisya Kirdyapkina | Russia | 1:26:31 | WL |
| 2nd place, silver medalist(s) | Liu Hong | China | 1:26:58 | SB |
| 3rd place, bronze medalist(s) | Elmira Alembekova | Russia | 1:27:02 | SB |
| 4 | Vera Sokolova | Russia | 1:27:03 | SB |
| 5 | Eleonora Giorgi | Italy | 1:27:05 | NR |
| 6 | Lü Xiuzhi | China | 1:27:15 | SB |
| 7 | Lyudmyla Olyanovska | Ukraine | 1:27:27 | NR |
| 8 | Ana Cabecinha | Portugal | 1:27:49 | SB |
| 9 | Antonella Palmisano | Italy | 1:27:51 | PB |
| 10 | Marina Pandakova | Russia | 1:27:54 | SB |
| 11 | Vera Santos | Portugal | 1:28:02 | PB |
| 12 | Lina Bikulova | Russia | 1:28:12 | PB |
| 13 | Raquel González | Spain | 1:28:36 | PB |
| 14 | Nie Jingjing | China | 1:28:43 | SB |
| 15 | María José Poves | Spain | 1:28:46 | SB |
| 16 | María Guadalupe González | Mexico | 1:28:48 | NR |
| 17 | Susana Feitor | Portugal | 1:28:51 | SB |
| 18 | Agnieszka Dygacz | Poland | 1:28:58 | NR |
| 19 | Ding Huiqin | China | 1:29:17 | PB |
| 20 | Sun Huanhuan | China | 1:29:20 | SB |
| 21 | Beatriz Pascual | Spain | 1:29:22 | SB |
| 22 | Inês Henriques | Portugal | 1:29:33 | SB |
| 23 | Neringa Aidietytė | Lithuania | 1:29:37 | NR |
| 24 | Kimberly García | Peru | 1:29:44 | AR, NR |
| 25 | Sandra Arenas | Colombia | 1:30:18 | NR |
| 26 | Mirna Ortiz | Guatemala | 1:30:18 | SB |
| 27 | Hanna Drabenia | Belarus | 1:30:32 | PB |
| 28 | Mayra Herrera | Guatemala | 1:30:41 | PB |
| 29 | Júlia Takács | Spain | 1:30:43 | |
| 30 | Maria Michta-Coffey | United States | 1:30:49 | NR |
| 31 | Rachel Seaman | Canada | 1:31:14 | |
| 32 | Alina Matveyuk | Belarus | 1:31:14 | PB |
| 33 | Inna Kashyna | Ukraine | 1:31:21 | |
| 34 | Brigita Virbalytė | Lithuania | 1:31:24 | SB |
| 35 | Khushbir Kaur | India | 1:31:40 | NR |
| 36 | Sandra Galvis | Colombia | 1:31:57 | PB |
| 37 | Laura Reynolds | Ireland | 1:32:25 | SB |
| 38 | Erica de Sena | Brazil | 1:32:27 | |
| 39 | Tanya Holliday | Australia | 1:32:36 | SB |
| 40 | Yanelli Caballero | Mexico | 1:32:51 | SB |
| 41 | Olena Shumkina | Ukraine | 1:32:52 | |
| 42 | Rei Inoue | Japan | 1:32:55 | |
| 43 | Kristina Saltanovič | Lithuania | 1:32:58 | SB |
| 44 | Katarzyna Burghardt | Poland | 1:33:08 | |
| 45 | Ainhoa Pinedo | Spain | 1:33:13 | SB |
| 46 | Jeon Yeongeun | South Korea | 1:33:38 | PB |
| 47 | Paulina Buziak | Poland | 1:33:50 | |
| 48 | Johanna Jackson | Great Britain | 1:33:55 | |
| 49 | Kelly Ruddick | Australia | 1:34:00 | SB |
| 50 | Maritza Poncio | Guatemala | 1:34:11 | PB |
| 51 | Mária Czaková | Slovakia | 1:34:13 | PB |
| 52 | Magaly Bonilla | Ecuador | 1:35:08 | PB |
| 53 | Cisiane Lopes | Brazil | 1:35:26 | SB |
| 54 | Kumiko Okada | Japan | 1:35:37 | |
| 55 | Halyna Yakovchuk | Ukraine | 1:35:48 | |
| 56 | Valentina Trapletti | Italy | 1:35:58 | |
| 57 | Federica Curiazzi | Italy | 1:35:59 | PB |
| 58 | Corinne Baudoin | France | 1:36:13 | PB |
| 59 | Miranda Melville | United States | 1:36:18 | |
| 60 | Paola Pérez | Ecuador | 1:36:19 | |
| 61 | Monika Kapera | Poland | 1:36:22 | |
| 62 | Darya Balkunets | Belarus | 1:36:31 | SB |
| 63 | Ángela Castro | Bolivia | 1:36:32 | SB |
| 64 | Ai Michiguchi | Japan | 1:36:47 | |
| 65 | Emilie Menuet | France | 1:38:07 | |
| 66 | Violaine Averous | France | 1:38:08 | SB |
| 67 | Mari Olsson | Sweden | 1:38:10 | SB |
| 68 | Claudia Balderrama | Bolivia | 1:38:10 | |
| 69 | Barbara Kovács | Hungary | 1:38:53 | PB |
| 70 | Inès Pastorino | France | 1:39:11 | |
| 71 | Laura Polli | Switzerland | 1:39:47 | |
| 72 | Polina Repina | Kazakhstan | 1:39:51 | PB |
| 73 | Marie Polli | Switzerland | 1:41:22 | SB |
| 74 | Yadira Guamán | Ecuador | 1:41:47 | SB |
| 75 | Cornelia Swart | South Africa | 1:42:19 | PB |
| 76 | Florida Miniyanova | Kazakhstan | 1:42:44 | SB |
| 77 | Nicola Evangelista | Canada | 1:43:22 | SB |
| 78 | Katie Burnett | United States | 1:44:00 | |
| 79 | Susan Randall | United States | 1:45:01 | |
| 80 | Erin Talcott | United States | 1:45:25 | |
| 81 | Elena Goh Ling Yin | Malaysia | 1:45:34 | PB |
| 82 | Katelynn Ramage | Canada | 1:49:30 | PB |
| 83 | Radosveta Simeonova | Bulgaria | DNF | * |
| 84 | Corinne Henchoz | Switzerland | DNF | * |
| — | Wendy Cornejo | Bolivia | DNF | |
| — | Agnese Pastare | Latvia | DNF | |
| — | Nastassia Yatsevich | Belarus | DNF | |
| — | Olha Iakovenko | Ukraine | DQ | 230.6(a) |

^{*}: beyond Time Limit
IAAF Rule 230.6(a): repeated failure to comply with the definition of race walking

=== Team (Women 20 km) ===
| Place | Country | Points |
|---|---|---|
| 1st place, gold medalist(s) | Russia | 8 pts |
| 2nd place, silver medalist(s) | China | 22 pts |
| 3rd place, bronze medalist(s) | Portugal | 36 pts |
| 4 | Spain | 49 pts |
| 5 | Italy | 70 pts |
| 6 | Ukraine | 81 pts |
| 7 | Lithuania | 100 pts |
| 8 | Guatemala | 104 pts |
| 9 | Poland | 109 pts |
| 10 | Belarus | 121 pts |
| 11 | Japan | 160 pts |
| 12 | United States | 167 pts |
| 13 | Ecuador | 186 pts |
| 14 | France | 189 pts |
| 15 | Canada | 190 pts |
| 16 | Switzerland | 228 pts |

=== Women's 10 km (Junior) ===
| Place | Athlete | Country | Time | Notes |
|---|---|---|---|---|
| 1st place, gold medalist(s) | Duan Dandan | China | 43:05 | WJL |
| 2nd place, silver medalist(s) | Yang Jiayu | China | 43:37 | PB |
| 3rd place, bronze medalist(s) | Anežka Drahotová | Czech Republic | 43:40 | NJR |
| 4 | Laura García-Caro | Spain | 45:29 | PB |
| 5 | Cun Hailu | China | 45:52 | |
| 6 | Klavdiia Afanaseva | Russia | 45:59 | PB |
| 7 | Viktoryia Rashchupkina | Belarus | 46:21 | PB |
| 8 | Clara Smith | Australia | 46:33 | PB |
| 9 | María Pérez | Spain | 46:41 | PB |
| 10 | Chahinez Nasri | Tunisia | 46:43 | AJR |
| 11 | Mildred Raya | Mexico | 47:13 | PB |
| 12 | Jemima Montag | Australia | 47:34 | |
| 13 | Eleonora Dominici | Italy | 47:37 | PB |
| 14 | Valeria Ortuño | Mexico | 47:44 | PB |
| 15 | Lidia Sánchez-Puebla | Spain | 48:07 | PB |
| 16 | Nicole Colombi | Italy | 48:22 | PB |
| 17 | Karla Jaramillo | Ecuador | 48:26 | NJR |
| 18 | Jéssica Hancco | Peru | 48:29 | PB |
| 19 | Živilė Vaiciukevičiūtė | Lithuania | 48:37 | PB |
| 20 | Daniela Pastrana | Colombia | 48:54 | PB |
| 21 | Anel Oosthuizen | South Africa | 48:59 | NJR |
| 22 | Monika Vaiciukevičiūtė | Lithuania | 49:01 | PB |
| 23 | Anastasiia Chernova | Russia | 49:11 | |
| 24 | Ganna Suslyk | Ukraine | 49:20 | |
| 25 | Elizabeth Hosking | Australia | 49:21 | PB |
| 26 | Mara Ribeiro | Portugal | 49:39 | SB |
| 27 | Ellie Dooley | Great Britain | 49:53 | |
| 28 | Diana Aydosova | Kazakhstan | 49:56 | PB |
| 29 | Rita Récsei | Hungary | 49:57 | PB |
| 30 | Mariana Mota | Portugal | 50:05 | PB |
| 31 | Dana Aydosova | Kazakhstan | 50:19 | |
| 32 | Emma Achurch | Great Britain | 50:20 | |
| 33 | María Guadalupe Sánchez | Mexico | 50:56 | |
| 34 | Monika Horňáková | Slovakia | 50:57 | |
| 35 | Eliška Drahotová | Czech Republic | 51:14 | |
| 36 | Tamara Stasiuk | Ukraine | 51:34 | |
| 37 | Edna Barros | Portugal | 51:50 | PB |
| 38 | Derya Karakurt | Turkey | 52:03 | |
| 39 | Cécile Deleuze | France | 52:38 | |
| 40 | Lena Tomas | Sweden | 52:38 | |
| 41 | Katharine Newhoff | United States | 52:52 | |
| 42 | Brenda McCollum | United States | 53:24 | |
| 43 | Ameni Manai | Tunisia | 53:55 | PB |
| 44 | Amira Zinhom | Egypt | 53:56 | PB |
| — | Margherita Crosta | Italy | DQ | 230.6(a) |
| — | Mariia Filiuk | Ukraine | DQ | 230.6(a) |
| — | Oxana Golyatkina | Russia | DQ | 230.6(a) |
| — | Katie Michta | United States | DQ | 230.6(a) |

IAAF Rule 230.6(a): repeated failure to comply with the definition of race walking

=== Team (Women 10 km Junior) ===
| Place | Country | Points |
|---|---|---|
| 1 | China | 3 pts |
| 2 | Spain | 13 pts |
| 3 | Australia | 20 pts |
| 4 | Mexico | 25 pts |
| 5 | Italy | 29 pts |
| 6 | Russia | 29 pts |
| 7 | Czech Republic | 38 pts |
| 8 | Lithuania | 41 pts |
| 9 | Tunisia | 53 pts |
| 10 | Portugal | 56 pts |
| 11 | Kazakhstan | 59 pts |
| 12 | United Kingdom | 59 pts |
| 13 | Ukraine | 60 pts |
| 14 | United States | 83 pts |

== Medal table (unofficial) ==
* Host nation (China)

| Rank | Nation | Gold | Silver | Bronze | Total |
|---|---|---|---|---|---|
| 1 | China* | 4 | 5 | 1 | 10 |
| 2 | Russia | 4 | 1 | 3 | 8 |
| 3 | Ukraine | 2 | 1 | 0 | 3 |
| 4 | Spain | 0 | 2 | 0 | 2 |
| 5 | Japan | 0 | 1 | 1 | 2 |
| 6 | Australia | 0 | 0 | 3 | 3 |
| 7 | Czech Republic | 0 | 0 | 1 | 1 |
| 7 | Portugal | 0 | 0 | 1 | 1 |
| Totals (8 entries) | | 10 | 10 | 10 | 30 |

- Note: Totals include both individual and team medals, with medals in the team competition counting as one medal.

== Participation ==
According to an unofficial count, 350 athletes from 48 countries participated.

- Australia (13)
- Belarus (8)
- Bolivia (5)
- Brazil (8)
- Bulgaria (2)
- Canada (8)
- Chile (1)
- China (21)
- Colombia (10)
- Costa Rica (2)
- Czech Republic (4)
- Ecuador (9)
- Egypt (3)
- El Salvador (1)
- France (11)
- Guatemala (7)
- Hong Kong (1)
- Hungary (4)
- India (10)
- Indonesia (1)
- Ireland (5)
- Italy (18)
- Japan (10)
- Kazakhstan (6)
- Latvia (2)
- Lithuania (8)
- Malaysia (3)
- Mexico (14)
- New Zealand (3)
- Norway (3)
- Peru (4)
- Poland (11)
- Portugal (13)
- Romania (1)
- Russia (21)
- Singapore (1)
- Slovakia (8)
- South Africa (6)
- South Korea (5)
- Spain (21)
- Sweden (6)
- Switzerland (4)
- Tajikistan (1)
- Tunisia (4)
- Turkey (5)
- Ukraine (21)
- United Kingdom (4)
- United States (13)

== See also ==
- Chinese Race Walking Grand Prix
