= Athletics at the 2024 Summer Olympics – Men's 20 kilometres walk =

Men's 20 kilometres walk at the Games of the XXXIII Olympiad
- Venue: Pont d'Iéna and Champ de Mars road course, Paris
- Date: 1 August 2024
- Competitors: 49 from 25 nations

Medalists
| 1st place, gold medalist(s) | | Brian Pintado | Ecuador |
| 2nd place, silver medalist(s) | | Caio Bonfim | Brazil |
| 3rd place, bronze medalist(s) | | Álvaro Martín | Spain |

The men's 20 kilometres race walk at the 2024 Summer Olympics was held in Paris, France, on 1 August 2024. It was the eighteenth time that the event was contested at the Summer Olympics.

== Summary ==
This was the first athletics event of this Olympics. Returning silver medalist Koki Ikeda made himself the favorite by walking within 15 seconds of countrymate Yusuke Suzuki's nine-year-old world record at the Japanese National Championships in February. Returning champion Massimo Stano had technically the third fastest time of the year, losing on the finish line to Zhang Jun a few weeks later. But the form chart was upset in May when returning bronze medalist Toshikazu Yamanishi, who did not even make the Japanese team, led double reigning World Champion Álvaro Martín, Caio Bonfim and Brian Pintado to beat both Ikeda and Zhang at the Gran Premio Cantones de A Coruña de Marcha in Spain.

49 walkers took the line with Bonfim charging off to a quick lead and a 4:00 lap of camera time, but after getting two yellow paddles he slowed and the peloton pulled him back over the second lap. The pack stayed together throughout the race with about half the field still in contact by the halfway point. Over the next few laps, more and more fell off the back, down to a dozen by 15 laps. As they moved into the last few laps, Stano, Martín, Bonfim, Pintado and Ikeda appeared at the front of the pack. Ikeda was the first to fall back as lap times dropped into the low 3:50's. The 18th lap was 3:45, separating the first four, several seconds back, only Evan Dunfee was able to keep up. Another 3:47 lap and Stano wasn't able to match the eventual medalists in a virtual tie at the bell. Pintado hit the gas, immediately separating from the other two, leaving them to battle for silver. He picked up two yellow paddles for contact, but since it was the final lap, those judges wouldn't have another opportunity to see him. Pintado's 3:31 was the fastest lap in the race by ten seconds. As Pintado accelerated, Bonfim tried to go with him and gained a couple of steps on Martín. Martín was never able to recover those steps conceding silver to pick up the Spanish flag as he crossed the finish line.

Pintado's victory comes 28 years after Jefferson Pérez won the first gold medal for Ecuador in this same event. In sixth place, 20 year old Misgana Wakuma set a new national record for Ethiopia.

== Background ==
The men's 20 kilometres race walk has been present on the Olympic athletics programme since 1956.

Global records before the 2024 Summer Olympics
| Record | Athlete (Nation) | Time | Location | Date |
|---|---|---|---|---|
| World record | Yusuke Suzuki (JPN) | 1:16.36 | Nomi, Japan | 15 March 2015 |
| Olympic record | Chen Ding (CHN) | 1:18.46 | London, Great Britain | 4 August 2012 |
| World leading | Koki Ikeda (JPN) | 1:16.51 | Kobe, Japan | 18 February 2024 |

Area records before the 2024 Summer Olympics
| Area Record | Athlete (Nation) | Time |
|---|---|---|
| Africa (records) | Samuel Gathimba (KEN) | 1:18.23 |
| Asia (records) | Yusuke Suzuki (JPN) | 1:16.36 WR |
| Europe (records) | Yohann Diniz (FRA) | 1:17.02 |
| North, Central America and Caribbean (records) | Julio Martínez (GUA) | 1:17.46 |
| Oceania (records) | Nathan Deakes (AUS) | 1:17.33 |
| South America (records) | Jefferson Pérez (ECU) | 1:17.21 |

== Qualification ==
For the men's 20 kilometres race walk event, the qualification period was between 1 July 2023 and 30 June 2024. 48 athletes were able to qualify for the event, with a maximum of three athletes per nation, by walking the entry standard of 1:20.10 seconds or faster or by their World Athletics Ranking for this event.

== Results ==
The event took place on 1 August, starting at 07:30 (UTC+2) in the morning. It had 20 one-kilometer laps around a road course at the Pont d'Iéna and Champ de Mars.

| Rank | Athlete | Nation | Time | Time behind | Notes |
|---|---|---|---|---|---|
| 1st place, gold medalist(s) | Brian Pintado | Ecuador | 1:18:55 | | |
| 2nd place, silver medalist(s) | Caio Bonfim | Brazil | 1:19:09 | +0:14 | ~~ |
| 3rd place, bronze medalist(s) | Álvaro Martín | Spain | 1:19:11 | +0:16 | |
| 4 | Massimo Stano | Italy | 1:19:12 | +0:17 | |
| 5 | Evan Dunfee | Canada | 1:19:16 | +0:21 | |
| 6 | Misgana Wakuma | Ethiopia | 1:19:31 | +0:36 | ~ NR |
| 7 | Koki Ikeda | Japan | 1:19:41 | +0:46 | |
| 8 | Yuta Koga | Japan | 1:19:50 | +0:55 | ~~ |
| 9 | Aurélien Quinion | France | 1:19:56 | +1:01 | PB |
| 10 | Zhang Jun | China | 1:19:56 | +1:01 | ~~ |
| 11 | Declan Tingay | Australia | 1:19:56 | +1:01 | ~ SB |
| 12 | Rhydian Cowley | Australia | 1:20:04 | +1:09 | |
| 13 | Noel Chama | Mexico | 1:20:19 | +1:24 | |
| 14 | Ricardo Ortiz | Mexico | 1:20:27 | +1:32 | |
| 15 | David Hurtado | Ecuador | 1:20:30 | +1:35 | |
| 16 | Callum Wilkinson | Great Britain | 1:20:31 | +1:36 | |
| 17 | Paul McGrath | Spain | 1:20:32 | +1:37 | |
| 18 | Ryo Hamanishi | Japan | 1:20:33 | +1:38 | ~ |
| 19 | Christopher Linke | Germany | 1:20:35 | +1:40 | |
| 20 | Francesco Fortunato | Italy | 1:20:38 | +1:43 | ~ |
| 21 | Perseus Karlström | Sweden | 1:21:05 | +2:10 | |
| 22 | Samuel Gathimba | Kenya | 1:21:26 | +2:31 | ~ SB |
| 23 | Leo Köpp | Germany | 1:21:36 | +2:41 | |
| 24 | Gabriel Bordier | France | 1:21:40 | +2:45 | |
| 25 | Jordy Jiménez | Ecuador | 1:21:44 | +2:49 | |
| 26 | Luis Henry Campos | Peru | 1:22:00 | +3:05 | SB |
| 27 | Artur Brzozowski | Poland | 1:22:11 | +3:16 | ~ |
| 28 | Max Batista | Brazil | 1:22:16 | +3:21 | ~ |
| 29 | Maher Ben Hlima | Poland | 1:22:34 | +3:39 | |
| 30 | Vikash Singh | India | 1:22:36 | +3:41 | |
| 31 | Li Yandong | China | 1:22:46 | +3:51 | ~ |
| 32 | Aku Partanen | Finland | 1:22:56 | +4:01 | > |
| 33 | Diego García | Spain | 1:23:10 | +4:15 | |
| 34 | Dominik Černý | Slovakia | 1:23:25 | +4:30 | |
| 35 | Kyle Swan | Australia | 1:23:32 | +4:37 | |
| 36 | Wang Zhaozhao | China | 1:23:40 | +4:45 | ~ |
| 37 | Paramjeet Singh Bisht | India | 1:23:48 | +4:53 | ~ |
| 38 | José Alejandro Barrondo | Guatemala | 1:24:17 | +5:22 | ~ |
| 39 | Matheus Corrêa | Brazil | 1:24:25 | +5:30 | ~>~ |
| 40 | Ihor Hlavan | Ukraine | 1:24:52 | +5:57 | ~>~ |
| 41 | Riccardo Orsoni | Italy | 1:25:08 | +6:13 | > |
| 42 | Choe Byeong-kwang | South Korea | 1:26:15 | +7:20 | ~ |
| 43 | Érick Barrondo | Guatemala | 1:26:19 | +7:24 | ~~~ |
| 44 | Máté Helebrandt | Hungary | 1:27:17 | +8:22 | ~~ |
| 45 | Salih Korkmaz | Turkey | 1:29:05 | +10:10 | SB |
| 46 | Bence Venyercsán | Hungary | 1:29:14 | +10:19 | ~~> |
| — | César Rodríguez | Peru | DNF | | ~~ |
| — | Akshdeep Singh | India | DNF | | |
| — | Jose Luis Doctor | Mexico | DSQ | | ~~~~ |
