= 2015 European Athletics U23 Championships – Men's 20 kilometres walk =

The men's 20 kilometres walk event at the 2015 European Athletics U23 Championships was held in Tallinn, Estonia, on 10 July.

== Medalists ==
Gold	Nikolay Markov; Russia
Silver	Álvaro Martín; Spain
Bronze	Pavel Parshin; Russia

== Results ==
=== Final ===
10 July

Rank	Name	Nationality	Time	Notes
1st place, gold medalist(s)	Nikolay Markov	Russia	1:23:49	
2nd place, silver medalist(s)	Álvaro Martín	Spain	1:24:51	
3rd place, bronze medalist(s)	Pavel Parshin	Russia	1:25:26	
4	Vito Minei	Italy	1:25:46	PB
5	Francisco José Durán	Spain	1:26:19	
6	Nils Brembach	Germany	1:26:30	
7	Aurélien Quinion	France	1:26:41	
8	Kirill Frolov	Russia	1:27:13	
9	Michele Antonelli	Italy	1:27:17	
10	Miguel Carvalho	Portugal	1:28:04	
11	Francesco Fortunato	Italy	1:28:20	
12	João Martins	Portugal	1:29:16	PB
13	Jonathan Hilbert	Germany	1:30:25	
14	Sahin Senoduncu	Turkey	1:30:39	
15	Vladyslav Lobchenko	Ukraine	1:31:34	
16	Tomasz Bagdány	Hungary	1:31:49	
17	Peter Tichý	Slovakia	1:32:08	
18	Konstadínos Dedópoulos	Greece	1:32:28	
19	Rui Coelho	Portugal	1:33:20	
20	Normantas Petriša	Lithuania	1:35:09	
21	Mert Atli	Turkey	1:42:48	
	Miklós Srp	Hungary	DQ	
	Marc Tur	Spain	DQ	
	Andriy Hrechkovskyy	Ukraine	DQ	
	Marius Šavelskis	Lithuania	DNF	

== Participation ==
According to an unofficial count, 25 athletes from 12 countries participated in the event.

- France (1)
- Germany (2)
- Greece (1)
- Hungary (2)
- Italy (3)
- Lithuania (2)
- Portugal (3)
- Russia (3)
- Slovakia (1)
- Spain (3)
- Turkey (2)
- Ukraine (2)
