= 2022 European Athletics Championships – Men's 20 kilometres walk =

Men's 20 kilometres walk at the 2022 European Athletics Championships
- Location: Munich
- Dates: 20 August
- Competitors: 29 from 13 nations
- Winning time: 1:19:11

Medalists
gold medal	Álvaro Martín	Spain
silver medal	Perseus Karlström	Sweden
bronze medal	Diego García Carrera	Spain

The men's 20 kilometres race walk at the 2022 European Athletics Championships took place at the streets of Munich on 20 August.

== Records ==
Standing records prior to the 2022 European Athletics Championships
World record	Yusuke Suzuki (JPN)	1:16:36	Nomi, Japan	15 March 2015
European record	Yohann Diniz (FRA)	1:17:02	Arles, France	8 March 2015
Championship record	Francisco Javier Fernández (ESP)	1:18:37	Munich, Germany	6 August 2002
World Leading	Vasiliy Mizinov (RUS)	1:17:47	Sochi, Russia	31 January 2022
Europe Leading	Vasiliy Mizinov (RUS)	1:17:47	Sochi, Russia	31 January 2022

== Schedule ==
Date	Time	Round
20 August 2022	8:30	Final

All times are local times (UTC+2)

== Results ==
The start on 8:30.

Rank	Name	Nationality	Time	Note
1st place, gold medalist(s)	Álvaro Martín	Spain	1:19:11	PB
2nd place, silver medalist(s)	Perseus Karlström	Sweden	1:19:23	
3rd place, bronze medalist(s)	Diego García Carrera	Spain	1:19:45	SB
4	Alberto Amezcua	Spain	1:20:00	
5	Francesco Fortunato	Italy	1:20:06	SB
6	Kévin Campion	France	1:20:47	PB
7	Salih Korkmaz	Turkey	1:20:50	PB
8	Massimo Stano	Italy	1:21:18	PB
9	Leo Köpp	Germany	1:21:36	PB
10	Andrea Cosi	Italy	1:22:18	
11	Iván López	Spain	1:22:55	
12	Marius Žiūkas	Lithuania	1:24:58	SB
13	Joni Hava	Finland	1:25:32	
14	Dominik Černý	Slovakia	1:25:38	
15	Viktor Shumik	Ukraine	1:25:51	SB
16	Arturas Mastianica	Lithuania	1:25:54	PB
17	Jerry Jokinen	Finland	1:26:11	PB
18	Ivan Losev	Ukraine	1:27:10	SB
19	Gabriel Bordier	France	1:28:11	
20	Karl Junghannß	Germany	1:28:21	
21	Hélder Santos	Portugal	1:28:43	
22	Serhiy Svitlychniy	Ukraine	1:28:51	SB
23	Raivo Saulgriezis	Latvia	1:29:24	
24	Jaakko Määttänen	Finland	1:29:38	
25	Paulo Martins	Portugal	1:31:09	
	Abdulselam İmük	Turkey	DNF	
	Nils Brembach	Germany	DQ	
	Şahin Şenoduncu	Turkey	DQ	
	Callum Wilkinson	Great Britain	DQ	
	João Vieira	Portugal	DNS	
