= Athletics at the 2020 Summer Olympics – Men's 20 kilometres walk =

Men's 20 kilometres walk at the Games of the XXXII Olympiad
- Olympic Athletics
- Venue: Odori Park, Sapporo
- Date: 5 August 2021
- Competitors: 57 from 28 nations

Medalists
1st place, gold medalist(s)		Massimo Stano	Italy
2nd place, silver medalist(s)		Koki Ikeda	Japan
3rd place, bronze medalist(s)		Toshikazu Yamanishi	Japan

The men's 20 kilometres walk event at the 2020 Summer Olympics took place on 5 August 2021 in Sapporo. Approximately 60 athletes competed; the exact number was dependent on how many nations use universality places to enter athletes in addition to the number qualifying through time (no universality places were used in 2016). The reigning champion was Wang Zhen of China.

== Background ==
This was the 17th appearance of the event, having appeared at every Olympics since 1956.

== Qualification ==
A National Olympic Committee (NOC) could enter up to 3 qualified athletes in the men's 20 kilometres walk if all athletes meet the entry standard or qualify by ranking during the qualifying period. (The limit of 3 has been in place since the 1930 Olympic Congress.) The qualifying standard is 1:21:00. This standard was "set for the sole purpose of qualifying athletes with exceptional performances unable to qualify through the IAAF World Rankings pathway." The world rankings, based on the average of the best five results for the athlete over the qualifying period and weighted by the importance of the meet, will then be used to qualify athletes until the cap of 60 is reached.

The qualifying period was originally from 1 January 2019 to 31 May 2020. Due to the COVID-19 pandemic, the period was suspended from 6 April 2020 to 30 November 2020, with the end date extended to 29 June 2021. The most recent Area Championships may be counted in the ranking, even if not during the qualifying period. In July 2020, World Athletics announced that the suspension period would be lifted for the road events (marathons and race walks) on 1 September 2020.

NOCs can also use their universality place—each NOC can enter one male athlete regardless of time if they had no male athletes meeting the entry standard for an athletics event—in the 20 kilometres walk.

=== Men's 20 km walk ===
Entry number: 60.

Qualification standard	No. of athletes	NOC	Nominated athletes
Entry standard – 1:21:00	3	China	Cai Zelin; Wang Kaihua; Zhang Jun
Entry standard – 1:21:00	3	India	Irfan Kolothum Thodi; Sandeep Kumar; Rahul Rohilla
Entry standard – 1:21:00	3	Italy	Francesco Fortunato; Massimo Stano; Federico Tontodonati
Entry standard – 1:21:00	3	Japan	Koki Ikeda; Eiki Takahashi; Toshikazu Yamanishi
Entry standard – 1:21:00	3	Mexico	Noel Alí Chama; Andrés Olivas; Jesús Tadeo Vega
Entry standard – 1:21:00	3	Spain	Álvaro Martín; Diego García; Miguel Ángel López
Entry standard – 1:21:00	1	Australia	Dane Bird-Smith; ~~Rhydian Cowley~~
Entry standard – 1:21:00	2	Brazil	Caio Bonfim; Matheus Corrêa
Entry standard – 1:21:00	1	Colombia	Éider Arévalo; ~~José Leonardo Montaña~~
Entry standard – 1:21:00	1	Ecuador	~~Andrés Chocho~~; Brian Pintado
Entry standard – 1:21:00	2	France	Gabriel Bordier; Kévin Campion
Entry standard – 1:21:00	2	Germany	Nils Brembach; Christopher Linke
Entry standard – 1:21:00	2	Great Britain	Tom Bosworth; Callum Wilkinson
Entry standard – 1:21:00	2	Guatemala	José Alejandro Barrondo; José Ortiz
Entry standard – 1:21:00	2	Ukraine	Ivan Losev; Eduard Zabuzhenko
Entry standard – 1:21:00	0	Ireland	~~Alex Wright~~
Entry standard – 1:21:00	1	Kazakhstan	Georgiy Sheiko
Entry standard – 1:21:00	0	Kenya	~~Samuel Gathimba~~
Entry standard – 1:21:00	1	Lithuania	Marius Žiūkas
Entry standard – 1:21:00	1	ROC	Vasiliy Mizinov
Entry standard – 1:21:00	1	South Africa	Wayne Snyman
Entry standard – 1:21:00	1	South Korea	Choe Byeong-kwang
Entry standard – 1:21:00	1	Sweden	Perseus Karlström
Entry standard – 1:21:00	1	Turkey	Salih Korkmaz
World ranking	1	Germany	Leo Köpp
World ranking	2	Turkey	Şahin Şenoduncu; Abdulselam İmuk
World ranking	1	Ukraine	Viktor Shumik
World ranking	1	Poland	Łukasz Niedziałek
World ranking	2	Colombia	Jhon Castañeda; Manuel Esteban Soto
World ranking	2	Peru	César Rodríguez; Luis Henry Campos
World ranking	2	Australia	Kyle Swan; Declan Tingay
World ranking	1	Belarus	Aliaksandr Liakhovich
World ranking	1	Ireland	David Kenny
World ranking	1	South Africa	~~Lebogang Shange~~
World ranking	1	Slovakia	Miroslav Úradník
World ranking	1	Brazil	Lucas Mazzo
World ranking	1	United States	Nick Christie
Total	60		

== Competition format and course ==
The event consists of a single race.

== Records ==
Prior to this competition, the existing world, Olympic, and area records were as follows.

World record	Yusuke Suzuki (JPN)	1:16:36	Nomi, Japan	15 March 2015
Olympic record	Chen Ding (CHN)	1:18.46	London, United Kingdom	4 August 2012

Area	Time	Athlete	Nation
Africa (records)	1:19:02	Hatem Ghoula	Tunisia
Asia (records)	1:16:36 WR	Yusuke Suzuki	Japan
Europe (records)	1:17:02	Yohann Diniz	France
North, Central America and Caribbean (records)	1:17:46	Julio René Martínez	Guatemala
Oceania (records)	1:17:33	Nathan Deakes	Australia
South America (records)	1:17:21	Jefferson Pérez	Ecuador

== Schedule ==
All times are Japan Standard Time (UTC+9)

The men's 20 kilometres walk took place on a single day.

Date	Time	Round
Thursday, 5 August 2021	16:30	Final

== Results ==
Rank	Athlete	Nation	Time	Time behind	Notes
1st place, gold medalist(s)	Massimo Stano	Italy	1:21:05		
2nd place, silver medalist(s)	Koki Ikeda	Japan	1:21:14	+0:09	
3rd place, bronze medalist(s)	Toshikazu Yamanishi	Japan	1:21:28	+0:23	
4	Álvaro Martín	Spain	1:21:46	+0:41	
5	Christopher Linke	Germany	1:21:50	+0:45	
6	Diego García	Spain	1:21:57	+0:52	
7	Wang Kaihua	China	1:22:03	+0:58	
8	Zhang Jun	China	1:22:16	+1:11	
9	Perseus Karlström	Sweden	1:22:29	+1:24	
10	Callum Wilkinson	Great Britain	1:22:38	+1:33	
11	Andrés Olivas	Mexico	1:22:46	+1:41	
12	Brian Pintado	Ecuador	1:22:54	+1:49	
13	Caio Bonfim	Brazil	1:23:21	+2:16	
14	Manuel Esteban Soto	Colombia	1:23:32	+2:27	
15	Francesco Fortunato	Italy	1:23:43	+2:38	
16	Kévin Campion	France	1:23:53	+2:48	SB
17	Declan Tingay	Australia	1:24:00	+2:55	PB
18	Éider Arévalo	Colombia	1:24:10	+3:05	
19	David Hurtado	Ecuador	1:24:31	+3:26	
20	Wayne Snyman	South Africa	1:24:33	+3:28	
21	César Rodríguez	Peru	1:24:40	+3:35	
22	Leo Kopp	Germany	1:24:46	+3:41	
23	Sandeep Kumar	India	1:25:07	+4:02	
24	Gabriel Bordier	France	1:25:23	+4:18	
25	Tom Bosworth	Great Britain	1:25:57	+4:52	
26	Cai Zelin	China	1:26:39	+5:34	
27	Jhon Castañeda	Colombia	1:26:41	+5:36	
28	Nils Brembach	Germany	1:26:45	+5:40	
29	David Kenny	Ireland	1:26:54	+5:49	
30	José Oswaldo Calel	Guatemala	1:26:55	+5:50	
31	Miguel Ángel López	Spain	1:27:12	+6:07	
32	Eiki Takahashi	Japan	1:27:29	+6:24	
33	Marius Žiūkas	Lithuania	1:27:35	+6:30	
34	Şahin Şenoduncu	Turkey	1:27:39	+6:34	
35	Jordy Jiménez	Ecuador	1:27:52	+6:47	
36	Kyle Swan	Australia	1:27:55	+6:50	
37	Choe Byeong-kwang	South Korea	1:28:12	+7:07	SB
38	Noel Alí Chama	Mexico	1:28:23	+7:18	
39	Georgiy Sheiko	Kazakhstan	1:28:38	+7:33	
40	José Ortiz	Guatemala	1:28:57	+7:52	
41	Miroslav Úradník	Slovakia	1:29:25	+8:20	
42	Jesús Tadeo Vega	Mexico	1:30:37	+9:32	
43	Luis Henry Campos	Peru	1:30:58	+9:53	
44	Federico Tontodonati	Italy	1:31:19	+10:14	
45	Aliaksandr Liakhovich	Belarus	1:31:28	+10:23	
46	Matheus Correa	Brazil	1:31:47	+10:42	
47	Rahul Rohilla	India	1:32:06	+11:01	
48	Abdulselam İmük	Turkey	1:32:27	+11:22	
49	Ivan Losev	Ukraine	1:33:26	+12:21	
50	Nick Christie	United States	1:34:37	+13:32	
51	Irfan Kolothum Thodi	India	1:34:41	+13:36	SB
52	Eduard Zabuzhenko	Ukraine	1:39:38	+18:33	
—	Lucas Mazzo	Brazil	Did not finish		
—	Łukasz Niedziałek	Poland	Did not finish		
—	Salih Korkmaz	Turkey	Did not finish		
—	Vasiliy Mizinov	ROC	Disqualified		
—	José Alejandro Barrondo	Guatemala	Disqualified		
