= Chinese Race Walking Grand Prix =

Annual race walking competition in Taicang, China

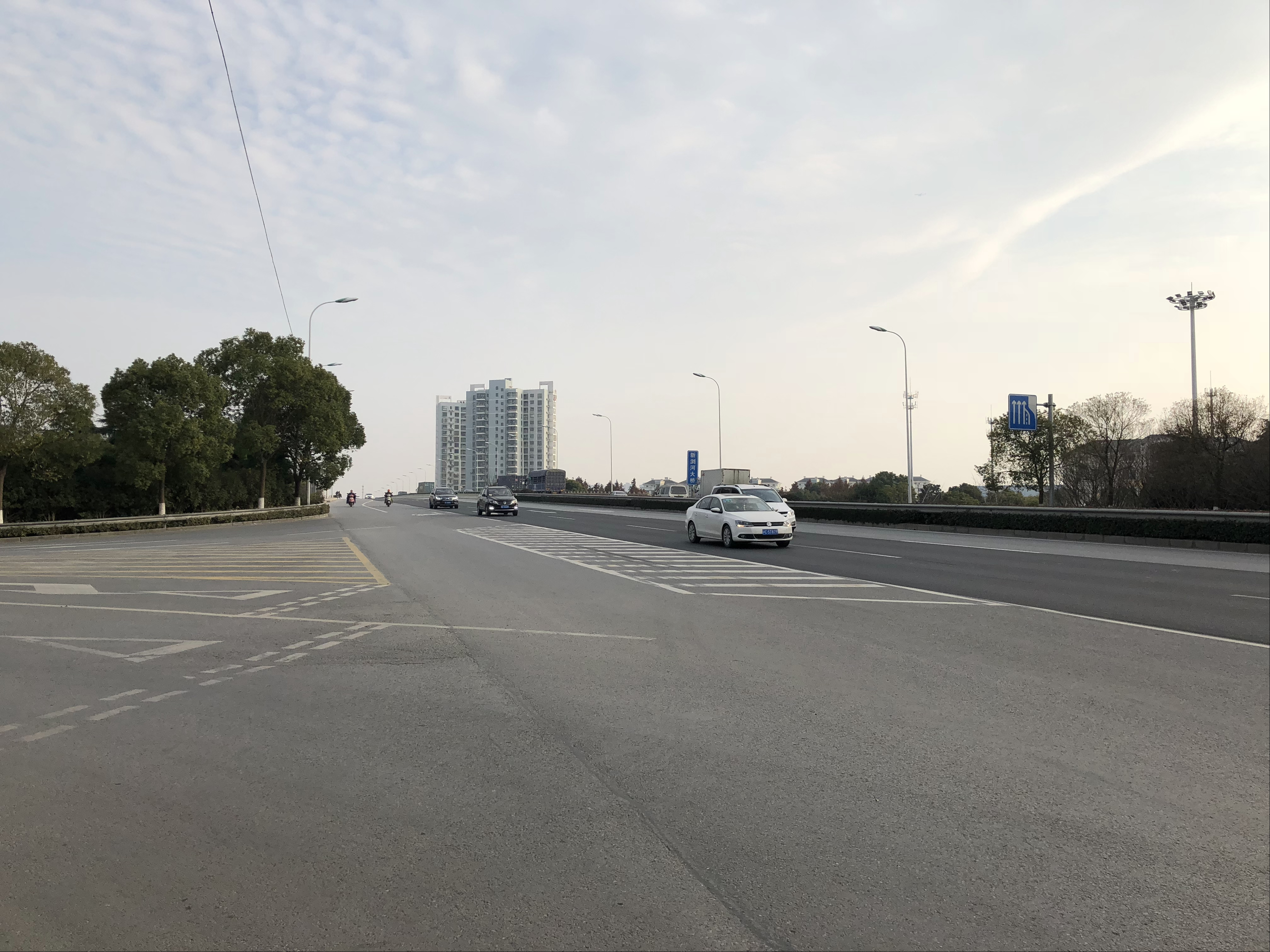
- An example road of Taicang, where the competition is held
- Date: March, April, or May
- Location: Taicang, Jiangsu, China
- Event type: Race walking
- World Athletics Cat.: A (World Athletics Race Walking Tour Gold)
- Distance: 20 km race walk 35 km race walk 50 km race walk Marathon race walk mixed relay
- Established: 2011

The Chinese Race Walking Grand Prix, formerly known as the Taicang IAAF Race Walking Challenge, is an annual race walking competition held in Taicang, China. As of 2023, it is a World Athletics Race Walking Tour Gold level meeting – the highest-level circuit of international race walking competitions.

The meeting is organized by the Chinese Athletic Association, and it is typically held in March, April, or May. There was a domestic race walking competition held in Taicang as far back as 2010, but the meeting became sponsored by World Athletics (then IAAF) and attracted international talent starting in 2011. In 2014, it served as the 2014 IAAF World Race Walking Cup, and in 2018 it hosted the championship again under its new name 2018 IAAF World Race Walking Team Championships. In 2024, it also served as the 2024 Olympic trials for China in the race walk. The citizens of Taicang were reported to have a "deep passion" for walking, and the city fielded a race walking team at the 2014 edition.

The competition was cancelled in 2020 due to the COVID-19 pandemic in China, and it did not return until 2023, rebranded as the Chinese Race Walking Grand Prix (or National Race Walking Grand Prix). There was a separate National Race Walking Grand Prix in Taicang in the past, but it did not receive Tour / IAAF Challenge status before 2023.

== Editions ==
Chinese Race Walking Grand Prix editions
Ed.	Name	Date	Ref.
1st	2011 Taicang IAAF Race Walking Challenge	22-24 April 2011	
2nd	2012 Taicang IAAF Race Walking Challenge	30 March 2012	
3rd	2013 Taicang IAAF Race Walking Challenge	1 March 2013	
4th	2014 IAAF World Race Walking Cup	3-4 May 2014	
6th	2015 Taicang IAAF Race Walking Challenge	1 May 2015	
7th	2016 Taicang IAAF Race Walking Challenge	23 April 2016	
8th	2017 Taicang IAAF Race Walking Challenge	15 April 2017	
9th	2018 IAAF World Race Walking Team Championships	5-6 May 2018	
10th	2019 Taicang IAAF Race Walking Challenge	11 May 2019	
11th	2023 Chinese Race Walking Grand Prix	8-9 April 2023	
12th	2024 Chinese Race Walking Grand Prix	3-9 March 2024	

== Winners ==
Chinese Race Walking Grand Prix senior race winners
Year	Men						Women						Mixed		R
Year	20 km walk		35 km walk		50 km walk		20 km walk		35 km walk		50 km walk		Marathon race walk mixed relay		R
2011	Wang Zhen (CHN)	1:18:30	—N/a		Si Tianfeng (CHN)	3:38:48	Liu Hong (CHN)	1:27:17	—N/a		—N/a		—N/a		
2012	Wang Zhen (CHN)	1:17:36 AR	—N/a		—N/a		Liu Hong (CHN)	1:25:46 AR	—N/a		—N/a		—N/a		
2013	Li Jianbo (CHN)	1:18:52	—N/a		—N/a		Sun Huanhuan (CHN)	1:27:36	—N/a		—N/a		—N/a		
2014	Ruslan Dmytrenko (UKR)	1:18:37 NR	—N/a		Ivan Noskov (RUS)	3:39:38	Anisya Kirdyapkina (RUS)	1:26:31	—N/a		—N/a		—N/a		
2015	Chen Ding (CHN)	1:19:53	—N/a		—N/a		Duan Dandan (CHN)	1:32:21	—N/a		—N/a		—N/a		
2016	Pedro Daniel Gómez (MEX)	1:20:52	—N/a		—N/a		Wang Yingliu (CHN)	1:30:51	—N/a		—N/a		—N/a		
2017	Caio Bonfim (BRA)	1:22:16	—N/a		—N/a		Lu Xiuzhi (CHN)	1:31:01	—N/a		—N/a		—N/a		
2018	Koki Ikeda (JPN)	1:21:13	—N/a		Hiroki Arai (JPN)	3:44:25	Maria Guadalupe González (MEX)	1:26:38	—N/a		Liang Rui (CHN)	4:04:36 WR	—N/a		
2019	Wang Kaihua (CHN)	1:19:48	—N/a		—N/a		Qieyang Shenjie (CHN)	1:28:00	—N/a		—N/a		—N/a		
2023 (Note: Races were limited to Chinese competitors. There were also senior men's and women's Team 20 km walks, which were won individually by Liu Xing (1:19:58) and Li Yanhong (1:32:30) respectively.)	Zhang Jun (CHN)	1:17:38	Wang Zhenhao (CHN)	2:35:17	—N/a		Liu Hong (CHN)	1:28:49	Chang Xiangkun (CHN)	2:51:20	—N/a		—N/a		
2024	Zhang Jun (CHN)	1:17:26	—N/a		—N/a		Ma Zhenxia (CHN)	1:26:07	—N/a		—N/a		Shaanxi B (CHN); Zhang Xinrui, Zhang Ting	3:01:22	
