= 2013 World Youth Championships in Athletics – Boys' 10,000 metres walk =

Boys' 10,000 metres walk at the 2013 World Youth Championships in Athletics
- Venue: RSC Olimpiyskiy
- Dates: 13 July
- Competitors: 40
- Winning time: 41:53.80 PB

Medalists
gold medal	Toshikazu Yamanishi	Japan
silver medal	Maksim Krasnov	Russia
bronze medal	Diego García	Spain

The boys' 10,000 metres walk at the 2013 World Youth Championships in Athletics was held on 13 July.

== Medalists ==
Gold	Silver	Bronze
Toshikazu Yamanishi; Japan	Maksim Krasnov; Russia	Diego García; Spain

== Records ==
Prior to the competition, the following records were as follows.

World Youth Best	Chen Ding (CHN)	39:47.20	Bydgoszcz, Poland	11 July 2008
Championship Record	Pavel Parshin (RUS)	40:51.31	Lille, France	9 July 2011
World Youth Leading	Paolo Yurivilca (PER)	41:40.57	Lima, Peru	15 June 2013

== Final ==
Rank	Name	Nationality	Result	Notes
1st place, gold medalist(s)	Toshikazu Yamanishi	Japan	41:53.80	PB
2nd place, silver medalist(s)	Maksim Krasnov	Russia	42:03.10	PB
3rd place, bronze medalist(s)	Diego García	Spain	42:03.32	PB
4	Yuga Yamashita	Japan	42:07.94	PB
5	Nathan Brill	Australia	42:54.70	
6	Zacharias Tsamoudakis	Greece	45:14.15	
7	Gregorio Angelini	Italy	45:26.66	PB
8	Bence Venyercsán	Hungary	46:08.48	
9	Yao Biao	China	46:15.78	PB
10	Manuel Bermúdez	Spain	46:21.96	
11	Marek Adamowicz	Canada	46:35.67	PB
12	Karl Junghannß	Germany	46:35.81	PB
13	Giuseppe Inglese	Italy	47:36.17	
14	Jefferson Chacón	Venezuela	47:39.34	
15	Cristian Merchán	Colombia	47:40.32	
16	Michal Morvay	Slovakia	47:51.77	PB
17	Jürgen Grave	Guatemala	48:04.81	
18	Hélder Santos	Portugal	48:33.81	PB
19	César Rodríguez	Peru	48:35.50	
20	Djaber Bouras	Algeria	48:54.12	
21	Dai Jianxing	China	49:23.34	PB
22	Braulio Morocho	Ecuador	49:26.60	
23	Oracio Chiliquinga	Ecuador	49:38.08	
24	Hamad Al-Hindaassi	United Arab Emirates	50:13.03	
25	Vitaliy Zub	Ukraine	50:28.47	
26	Óscar Menjívar	El Salvador	50:43.36	
27	Andrei Gafița	Romania	50:54.19	
	José Alejandro Barrondo	Guatemala	DQ	
	Brayan Fuentes	Colombia	DQ	
	Vitaliy Terekhin	Kazakhstan	DQ	
	Miroslav Úradník	Slovakia	DNF	
	Muratcan Karapınar	Turkey	DNF	
	Nikola Lilić	Serbia	DNF	
	Mohamed Fekkoun	Algeria	DNF	
	Vladislav Saraykin	Russia	DNF	
	Artūrs Makars	Latvia	DNF	
	Paolo Yurivilca	Peru	DNF	
	Maricel Necula	Romania	DNF	
	Oleksandr Zholob	Ukraine	DNF	
	Efstratios-Georgios Kelepouris	Greece	DNF	
