= Athletics at the 2010 Summer Youth Olympics – Boys' 10 kilometre walk =

Athletics – Boys' 10 kilometres walk at the I Summer Youth Olympic Games
- Venue: Bishan Stadium
- Date: August 22
- Competitors: 17 from 17 nations

Medalists
1st place, gold medalist(s)		Igor Lyashchenko	Ukraine
2nd place, silver medalist(s)		Oscar Villavicencio	Ecuador
3rd place, bronze medalist(s)		Pavel Parshin	Russia

The boys' 10 kilometres walk competition at the 2010 Youth Olympic Games was held on 22 August 2010 in Bishan Stadium.

== Schedule ==
Date	Time	Round
22 August 2010	19:05	Final

== Results ==
=== Final ===
Rank	Athlete	Time	Notes
1st place, gold medalist(s)	Igor Lyashchenko (UKR)	42:43.93	
2nd place, silver medalist(s)	Oscar Villavicencio (ECU)	43:46.00	PB
3rd place, bronze medalist(s)	Pavel Parshin (RUS)	44:18.04	
4	Leonardo Serra (ITA)	45:19.73	
5	Wei Xubao (CHN)	45:33.80	
6	Tewfik Yesref (ALG)	45:38.46	PB
7	Jesus Vega (MEX)	46:08.16	
8	Yauhen Zaleski (BLR)	46:52.38	
9	Álvaro Martín (ESP)	47:04.10	
10	Tyler Sorensen (USA)	47:07.77	
11	Blake Steele (AUS)	48:00.85	
	Hazem Alhasan Alahmad (SYR)	DNF	
	Matthew Holcroft (NZL)	DNF	
	Kuldeep Kumar (IND)	DNF	
	Ivan Salyakhov (KAZ)	DNF	
	Éider Arévalo (COL)	DSQ	
	Marius Savelskis (LTU)	DSQ	

Intermediate times:

1000m	4:11.46	Igor Lyashchenko (UKR)
2000m	8:19.88	Pavel Parshin (RUS)
3000m	12:36.86	Pavel Parshin (RUS)
4000m	16:59.87	Igor Lyashchenko (UKR)
5000m	21:24.85	Pavel Parshin (RUS)
6000m	25:38.82	Igor Lyashchenko (UKR)
7000m	29:53.66	Igor Lyashchenko (UKR)
8000m	34:11.26	Igor Lyashchenko (UKR)
9000m	38:27.27	Igor Lyashchenko (UKR)
