= 2018 European Athletics Championships – Men's 20 kilometres walk =

Men's 20 kilometres walk at the 2018 European Athletics Championships
- Venue: Olympic Stadium
- Location: Berlin
- Dates: 11 August 2018
- Competitors: 28 from 15 nations
- Winning time: 1:20:42

Medalists
gold medal	Álvaro Martín	Spain
silver medal	Diego García	Spain
bronze medal	Vasiliy Mizinov	Authorised Neutral Athletes

The men's 20 kilometres race walk at the 2018 European Athletics Championships took place at the Olympic Stadium on 7 August.

== Records ==
Standing records prior to the 2018 European Athletics Championships
World record	Yusuke Suzuki (JPN)	1:16:36	Nomi, Japan	15 March 2015
European record	Yohann Diniz (FRA)	1:17:02	Arles, France	8 March 2015
Championship record	Francisco Javier Fernández (ESP)	1:18:37	Munich, Germany	6 August 2002
World Leading	Sergey Shirobokov (RUS)	1:17:25	Cheboksary, Russia	9 June 2018
European Leading	Sergey Shirobokov (RUS)	1:17:25	Cheboksary, Russia	9 June 2018

== Schedule ==
Date	Time	Round
11 August 2018	10:55	Final

All times are local times (UTC+2)

== Results ==
=== Final ===
Rank	Name	Nationality	Time	Note
1st place, gold medalist(s)	Álvaro Martín	Spain	1:20:42	SB
2nd place, silver medalist(s)	Diego García	Spain	1:20:48	
3rd place, bronze medalist(s)	Vasiliy Mizinov	Authorised Neutral Athletes	1:20:50	
4	Massimo Stano	Italy	1:20:51	PB
5	Nils Brembach	Germany	1:21:25	SB
6	Miguel Ángel López	Spain	1:21:27	
7	Tom Bosworth	Great Britain	1:21:31	
8	Hagen Pohle	Germany	1:21:35	SB
9	Kévin Campion	France	1:21:52	SB
10	Alex Wright	Ireland	1:22:18	SB
11	Viktor Shumik	Ukraine	1:22:24	PB
12	Ivan Losev	Ukraine	1:22:28	
13	Christopher Linke	Germany	1:22:33	
14	Gabriel Bordier	France	1:22:39	
15	Alexandros Papamichail	Greece	1:22:51	
16	Francesco Fortunato	Italy	1:23:04	SB
17	Luis Alberto Amezcua	Spain	1:23:33	
18	Aliaksandr Liakhovich	Belarus	1:24:07	
19	Dawid Tomala	Poland	1:25:06	
20	Perseus Karlström	Sweden	1:25:16	
21	Cian McManamon	Ireland	1:25:43	
22	Miroslav Úradník	Slovakia	1:25:44	
23	Oleksiy Kazanin	Ukraine	1:26:49	
	Artur Brzozowski	Poland	DQ	230.7 (a)
	Salih Korkmaz	Turkey	DQ	230.7 (a)
	Giorgio Rubino	Italy	DQ	230.7 (a)
	Florin Alin Știrbu	Romania	DQ	230.7 (a)
	Callum Wilkinson	Great Britain	DQ	230.7 (a)
