= Kevin Campion =

Kevin Campion may refer to:

- Kévin Campion (born 1988), French racewalker
- Kevin Campion (rugby league) (born 1971), Australian rugby league footballer
