= Jordy Jiménez =

Ecuadorian racewalker (born 1994)

Personal information
- Nationality: Ecuadorian
- Born: 11 February 1994 (age 32)
- Height: 1.68 m (5 ft 6 in)
- Weight: 54 kg (119 lb)

Sport
- Sport: Athletics
- Event: Race walking
Medal record
Representing Ecuador
Men's athletics
World Team Championships
Gold medal – first place	2022 Muscat	20 km walk (team)
Bronze medal – third place	2016 Rome	20 km walk (team)
Pan American Cup
Gold medal – first place	2025 Anapoima	20 km walk
South American Games
Bronze medal – third place	2026 Santa Fe	Half marathon walk
South American Championships
Silver medal – second place	2025 Mar del Plata	20 km walk
South American Race Walking Championships
Bronze medal – third place	2022 Lima	20 km walk
Bolivarian Games
Gold medal – first place	2022 Valledupar	20 km walk
Gold medal – first place	2025 Lima-Ayacucho	Half marathon walk

Jordy Rafael Jiménez Arrobo (born 11 February 1994) is an Ecuadorian racewalking athlete. He represented Ecuador at the 2020 and 2024 Summer Olympics.

== Career ==
In June 2021, Jiménez represented Ecuador during the Spanish leg of the World Race Walking Challenge where finished in 10th place with a personal best time of 1:20:47.

In August 2021, Jiménez represented Ecuador at the 2020 Summer Olympics in the 20 kilometres walk and finished in 35th place with a time of 1:27:52. He again represented Ecuador at the 2024 Summer Olympics in the 20 kilometres walk and finished in 25th place with a time of 1:21:44.

In November 2025, he competed at the 2025 Bolivarian Games and won a gold medal in the 20 kilometre walk.
