= Álvaro Martín (race walker) =

Spanish racewalker

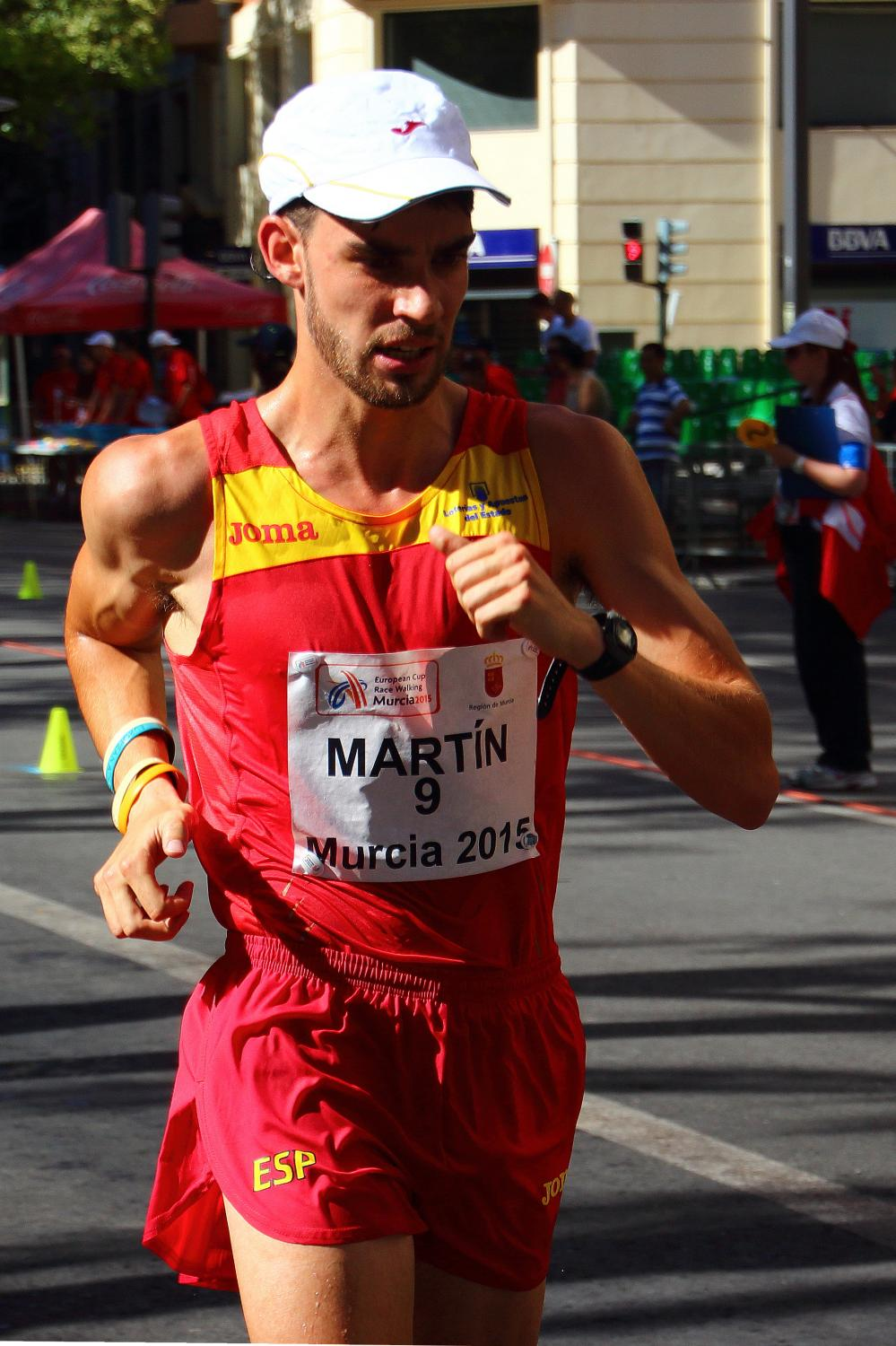
- Martín at the 2015 European Cup Race Walking

Personal information
- Full name: Álvaro Rafael Martín Uriol
- Born: 18 June 1994 (age 32) Llerena, Spain
- Height: 179 cm (5 ft 10 in)
- Weight: 63 kg (139 lb)

Sport
- Country: Spain
- Sport: Athletics
- Event(s): 20 km race walk 35 km race walk

Achievements and titles
- Personal bests: 20 km: 1:17:32 (2023); 35 km: 2:24:30 (2023) NR
Medal record
Men's athletics
Representing Spain
Olympic Games
Gold medal – first place	2024 Paris	Marathon walk relay
Bronze medal – third place	2024 Paris	20 km walk
World Championships
Gold medal – first place	2023 Budapest	20 km walk
Gold medal – first place	2023 Budapest	35 km walk
World Team Championships
Silver medal – second place	2022 Muscat	35 km walk
Bronze medal – third place	2016 Rome	20 km walk
Bronze medal – third place	2024 Antalya	Marathon walk (mixed relay)
European Championships
Gold medal – first place	2018 Berlin	20 km walk
Gold medal – first place	2022 Munich	20 km walk

Álvaro Rafael Martín Uriol (born 18 June 1994 in Llerena) is a Spanish racewalker.

== Career ==
Martín won the gold medals in the 20 km walk and 35 km walk at the 2023 World Athletics Championships in Budapest.

He won consecutive gold medals in the 20 km walk at the European Athletics Championships in 2018 and 2022 European Athletics Championships.

Martín won a winning a gold and bronze medal in the mixed marathon walk relay and 20 km walk at the 2024 Olympic Games in Paris.

He also competed in the 20 km walk at the Olympic Games in 2012 in London (DNF), 2016 in Rio de Janeiro (22nd) and 2020 in Tokyo (4th).

Martín announced his retirement after the Olympic Games in Paris.

== Competition record ==
Year	Competition	Venue	Position	Event	Notes
Representing Spain
2010	Youth Olympic Games	Singapore	9th	10,000 m	47:04
2011	World Youth Championships	Lille Métropole, France	8th	10,000 m	42:27
2012	World Junior Championships	Barcelona, Spain	5th	10,000 m	40:35
2012	Olympic Games	London, United Kingdom	—	20 km	DNF
2013	European Junior Championships	Rieti, Italy	3rd	10,000 m	41:13
2013	World Championships	Moscow, Russian Federation	24th	20 km	1:25:12
2014	World Race Walking Cup	Taicang, China	19th	20 km	1:20:39
2014	Mediterranean U23 Championships	Aubagne, France	1st	10,000 m	42:50
2014	European Championships	Zürich, Switzerland	6th	20 km	1:21:41
2015	European U23 Championships	Tallinn, Estonia	2nd	20 km	1:24:51
2015	World Championships	Beijing, China	16th	20 km	1:22:04
2016	World Race Walking Team Championships	Rome, Italy	3rd	20 km	1:19:36
2016	Olympic Games	Rio de Janeiro, Brazil	22nd	20 km	1:22:11
2017	World Championships	London, United Kingdom	8th	20 km	1:19:41
2018	World Race Walking Team Championships	Taicang, China	8th	20 km	1:23:22
2018	European Championships	Berlin, Germany	1st	20 km	1:20:42
2019	World Championships	Doha, Qatar	22nd	20 km	1:33:20
2021	Olympic Games	Sapporo, Japan	4th	20 km	1:21.46
2022	World Race Walking Team Championships	Muscat, Oman	2nd	35 km	2:36:54
2022	Ibero-American Championships	La Nucía, Spain	1st	10,000 m	39:24.20
2022	World Championships	Eugene, United States	7th	20 km	1:20:19
2022	European Championships	Munich, Germany	1st	20 km	1:19:11
2023	World Championships	Budapest, Hungary	1st	20 km	1:17:32
2024	Olympic Games	Paris, France	3rd	20 km	1:19:11
2024	Olympic Games	Paris, France	1st	Mixed marathon walk relay	2:50:31
