= Jesús Tadeo Vega =

Mexican racewalker

Personal information
- Born: 23 May 1994 (age 32) Mexico City, Mexico

Sport
- Sport: Athletics
- Event: Racewalking

Jesús Tadeo Vega (born 23 May 1994) is a Mexican racewalking athlete. He qualified to represent Mexico at the 2020 Summer Olympics in Tokyo 2021, competing in men's 20 kilometres walk.
