= Lucas Mazzo =

Brazilian racewalker (born 1994)

Personal information
- Born: 19 May 1994 (age 32) Belém, Brazil

Sport
- Sport: Men's Athletics
- Event: Racewalking

Lucas Mazzo (born 19 May 1994) is a Brazilian racewalking athlete. He represented Brazil at the 2020 Summer Olympics in the men's 20 kilometres walk.

== Career ==
Mazzo represented Brazil at the 2021 South American Championships in the 20,000 meters walk and finished in fifth place with a time of 1:28:26.92. He then represented Brazil at the 2020 Summer Olympics in the men's 20 kilometres walk, and did not finish.
