= Marc Tur =

Spanish racewalker (born 1994)

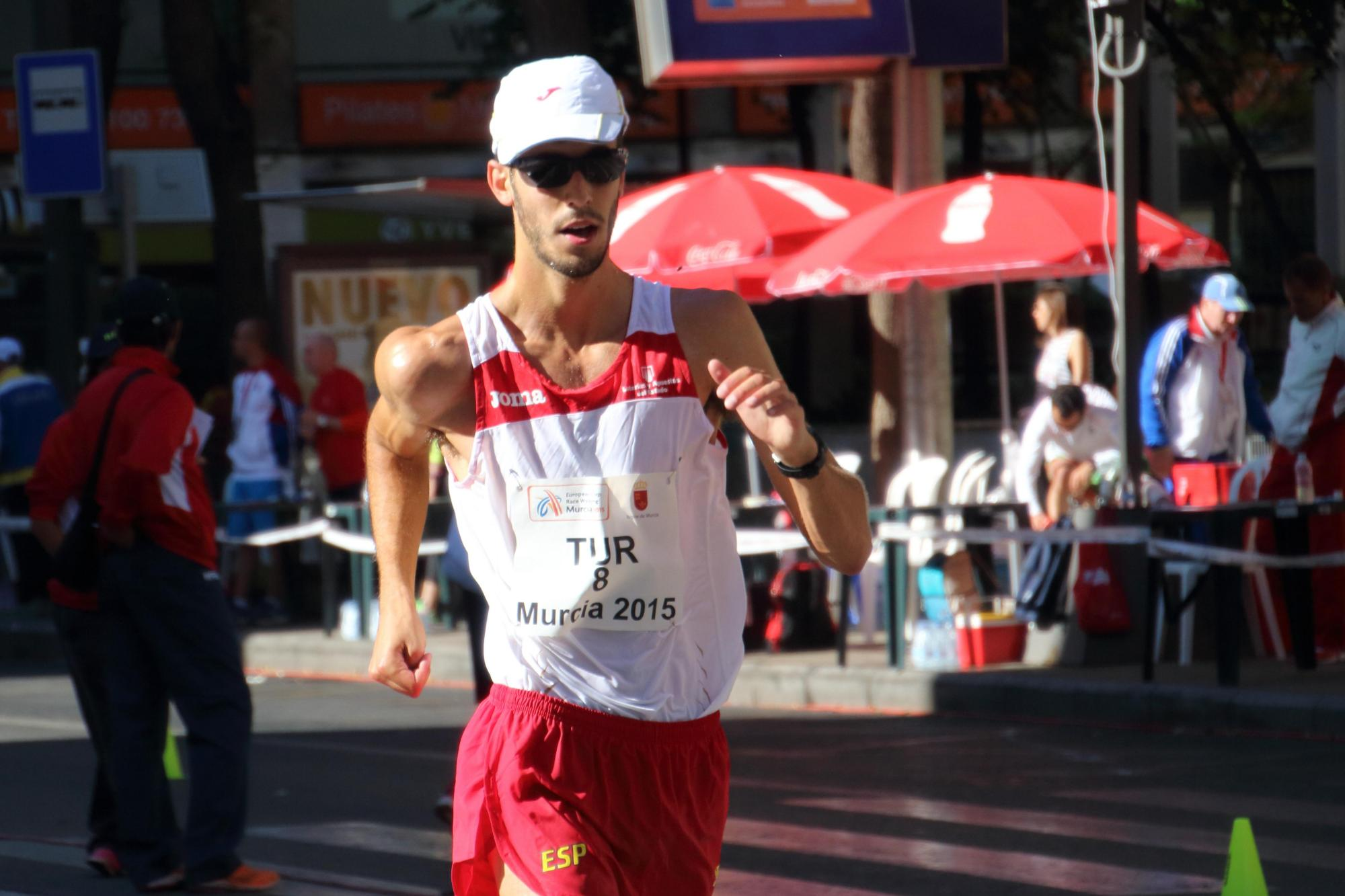
- Tur in 2015

Personal information
- Full name: Marc Vicent Tur Picó
- Nationality: Spanish
- Born: 30 November 1994 (age 31) Santa Eulària des Riu, Spain
- Height: 191 cm (6 ft 3 in)
- Weight: 72 kg (159 lb)

Sport
- Country: Spain
- Sport: Racewalking

Achievements and titles
- Personal bests: 3:47.40 (50 km, 2021)

Marc Vicent Tur Picó (born 30 November 1994) is a Spanish racewalker. In 2019, he competed in the men's 50 kilometres walk at the 2019 World Athletics Championships held in Doha, Qatar. He finished in 19th place.

In 2018, he competed in the men's 50 kilometres walk at the 2018 European Athletics Championships held in Berlin, Germany. He finished in 22nd place.

During the 2020 Summer Olympics in Tokyo, he placed 4th in the men's 50 kilometres walk.

== Competition record ==
Year	Competition	Venue	Position	Event	Notes
Representing Spain
2012	World Junior Championships	Barcelona, Spain	29th	10,000 m	44:42
2013	European Junior Championships	Rieti, Italy	5th	10,000 m	41:51
2014	World Race Walking Cup	Taicang, China	42nd	20 km	1:22:46
2014	Mediterranean U23 Championships	Aubagne, France	2nd	10,000 m	42:52
2014	Ibero-American Championships	São Paulo, Brazil	2nd	20,000 m	1:23:22
2015	European U23 Championships	Tallinn, Estonia	—	20 km	DQ
2016	Mediterranean U23 Championships	Radès, Tunisia	4th	10,000 m	41:23
2018	World Race Walking Team Championships	Taicang, China	24th	50 km	3:56:28
2018	European Championships	Berlin, Germany	22nd	50 km	4:09:18
2019	World Championships	Doha, Qatar	19th	50 km	4:24:38
2021	Summer Olympics	Sapporo, Japan	4th	50 km	3:51:08

== Personal life ==
Tur is openly gay.
