= Matheus Corrêa =

Brazilian racewalker (born 1999)

Personal information
- Full name: Matheus Gabriel De Liz Corrêa
- Born: 22 August 1999 (age 26) Blumenau, Brazil

Sport
- Sport: Athletics
- Event: Race walking
Medal record
Representing Brazil
Men's athletics
Ibero-American Championships
Gold medal – first place	2024 Cuiabá	20 km walk
Bronze medal – third place	2026 Lima	10,000 m walk
South American Championships
Bronze medal – third place	2025 Mar del Plata	20 km walk
South American Race Walking Championships
Silver medal – second place	2024 Recife	20 km walk
Junior Pan American Games
Silver medal – second place	2021 Cali-Valle	20,000 m walk
South American U23 Championships
Gold medal – first place	2021 Guayaquil	20,000 m walk

Matheus Gabriel De Liz Corrêa (born 22 August 1999) is a Brazilian racewalking athlete. He qualified to represent Brazil at the 2020 Summer Olympics in Tokyo 2021, competing in men's 20 kilometres walk.
