= Miguel Carvalho (race walker) =

Portuguese racewalker

Miguel Ângelo Henriques Carvalho (born 2 September 1994) is a Portuguese racewalker. He placed 36th in the men's 50 kilometres walk at the 2016 Summer Olympics.
