= Abdulselam İmük =

Turkish racewalker

Personal information
- Nationality: Turkish
- Born: 10 October 1999 (age 27) Istanbul, Turkey

Sport
- Sport: Athletics
- Event: Race walking
Medal record
Men's race walking
Representing Turkey
Balkan Race Walking Championships
Bronze medal – third place	2020 Ivano-Frankivsk	20 km walk
Silver medal – second place	2020 Ivano-Frankivsk	20 km walk team

Abdulselam İmük (born 10 October 1999) is a Turkish racewalking athlete.

İlmük won the bronze medal in the 20 km walk event at the 2020 Balkan Championship held in Ivano-Frankivsk, Ukraine. This result enabled him to participate at the 2020 Summer Olympics. He was also part of the team, which took the silver medal at the same competition. Representing Turkey at the 2020 Summer Olympics, he placed 48th in 20 km walk.
