= Kyle Swan =

Australian racewalker

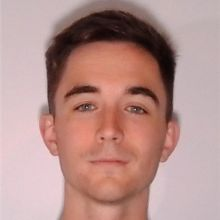
- Swan in 2024

Personal information
- Nationality: Australian
- Born: 28 March 1999 (age 27) Wantirna, Victoria, Australia
- Height: 1.74 m (5 ft 9 in)

Sport
- Sport: Athletics
- Event: Racewalking

Kyle Swan (born 28 March 1999) is an Australian racewalking athlete.

== Early years ==
When Swan was 6 years old he started watching his older brother at Little Athletics. He joined and found that he could walk the 800m easily. (This was the longest distance for children of his age). His first coach was Fran Attard. He made his junior international debut aged 16 at the 2015 World Youth (U18) Championships.

He attended Melbourne High School, graduating in 2017 and in 2021 completed a Bachelor of Science at the University of Melbourne.

== Achievements ==
In 2018, Swan was the first Australian across the line in 10th place in the junior event at the World Race Walking Cup in China, helping Australia to win a bronze medal in the team event. Two months later he competed in the World U20 Championships in Finland where he came sixth in a time of 41:24.12.

As a senior athlete Swan needed to race over twice the distance, 20 km, and it took some time to adjust. In December 2019 he recorded 1:23.53 and in 2021 he set track best times over 5000m and 10,000m, and had two solid walks just outside his 20 km PB. He qualified to represent Australia at the 2020 Summer Olympics in Tokyo 2021 in the men's 20 kilometres walk where he came 36th with a time of 1:27.55, 6:50 behind the winner Massimo Stano of Italy.

Swan also competed at the 2024 Summer Olympics.
