= Noel Chama =

Mexican racewalker

Personal information
- Full name: Noel Alí Chama Almazán
- Born: 15 September 1997 (age 28) State of Mexico, Mexico

Sport
- Sport: Athletics
- Event: Racewalking

Noel Alí Chama Almazán (born 15 September 1997) is a Mexican racewalking athlete. He qualified to represent Mexico at the 2020 Summer Olympics in Tokyo 2021, competing in men's 20 kilometres walk.
