= Declan Tingay =

Australian racewalker

Personal information
- Nationality: Australian; American
- Born: 6 February 1999 (age 27) Los Angeles, California, United States

Sport
- Country: Australia
- Sport: Athletics
- Event: Racewalking
Medal record
Men's athletics
Representing Australia
Commonwealth Games
Silver medal – second place	2022 Birmingham	10,000 m walk

Declan Tingay (born 6 February 1999) is an Australian racewalking athlete. He won the silver medal in the 10,000 metres walk at the 2022 Commonwealth Games. Tingay is the Oceanian record holder for the 5000 m and 10,000 m walk.

== Early years ==
Tingay started walking when he was 9 months and started Little Athletics when he was 5 years of age. His parents encouraged him as they wanted to give him an opportunity to play sport and also the athletics club was the most local to them. He found that he was a good walker and was best over long distances Tingay became serious when he was under 14 and 4 years later he just missed the national under-18 5000m walk record by a second. He attended Wesley College in South Perth.

== Achievements ==
Tingay took the Australian under-20 10,000m walk record when placed fourth at the 2018 IAAF World U20 Championships. His time was 40:49.72 and he was superior to Olympians Dane Bird-Smith, Jared Tallent, Nick A'Hern and Luke Adams.

In 2018, he won bronze as a member of the national U20 team at the World Race Walking Team Championships in Taicang, China, and placed fourth in the 10,000m walk at the World U20 Championships held in Tampere, Finland. He was disqualified in his next international outing at the 2019 Summer Universiade staged in Naples, Italy.

However, in 2021 he smashed his personal best in the 20 km walk and qualified to represent Australia in the event at the postponed 2020 Summer Olympics in Tokyo. Tingay finished in 17th place with a time of 1:24.00 close to 3 minutes behind the eventual winner, Massimo Stano.

Tingay also competed at the 2024 Summer Olympics.

Although self-coached, Tingay does work with Brent Valance. He studied Sports Science & Exercise and Health at the University of Western Australia.

== Personal bests ==
- 5000 metres race walk – 18:24.50 (Melbourne 2022) Oceanian record
- 10,000 metres race walk – 38:03.78 (Canberra 2023) Oceanian record
- 10 kilometres race walk – 40:26 (Madrid 2022)
- 20 kilometres race walk – 1:20:44 (Adelaide 2022)
