= Federico Tontodonati =

Italian racewalker

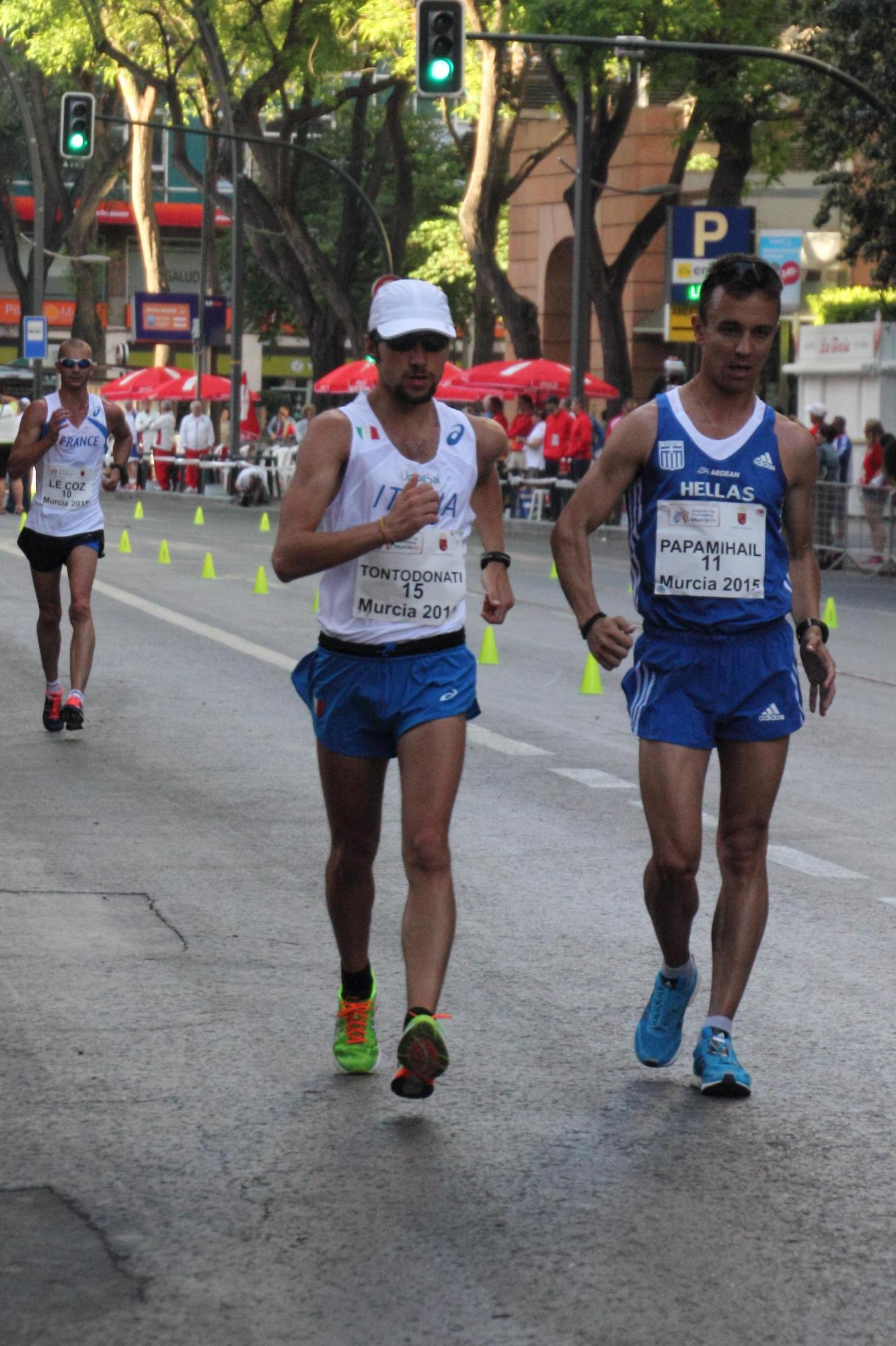
- Tontodonati (left) in 2015

Personal information
- National team: Italy (15 caps)
- Born: 30 October 1989 (age 36) Turin, Italy

Sport
- Sport: Athletics
- Event: Racewalking
- Club

Achievements and titles
- Personal bests: 20 km walk: 1:20:12 (2021); 50 km walk: 3:49:27 (2015)
Medal record
Event	1st	2nd	3rd
World Athletics Race Walking Team C'ships	0	1	1
European Race Walking Team C'hips	0	4	0
Total	0	5	1
World Athletics Race Walking Team C'ships
Silver medal – second place	2016 Rome	50 km walk (team)
Bronze medal – third place	2018 Taicang	20 km walk (team)
European Race Walking Team Championships
Silver medal – second place	2011 Olhão	20 km walk (team)
Silver medal – second place	2015 Murcia	50 km walk (team)
Silver medal – second place	2011 Poděbrady	50 km walk (team)
Silver medal – second place	2021 Poděbrady	20 km walk (team)

Federico Tontodonati (born 30 October 1989) is a male Italian racewalker who won six international medals at senior level at the race walk competitions. He competed at the 2020 Summer Olympics, in 20 km walk.

== Biography ==
He competed in the 20 kilometres walk event at the 2015 World Championships in Athletics in Beijing, China, finishing at the 27th position. He won 9 national titles: 3 over 50 km (in 2011, 2012, 2015), 3 over 20 km (2012, 2016, 2021), two over 10 km (2015 and 2017) and one over 5000 m indoor (2021).

== Tontodonati family ==
Tontodonati is a family of sportswomen and sportsmen. Federico is the brother of the kayaking coach Matteo Tontodonati (born 1991) and the nephew of the Italian ex-rower Letizia Tontodonati (born 1998), ex-brother-in-law of the Australian-born Italian rower Kiri Tontodonati (born 1994), ex-wife of Matteo, coach of the kayaker Marco Tontodonati (born 2005), and son of the rowing coach Mauro Tontodonati (born 1963).

== National titles ==
Tontodonati won eight national championships at individual senior level.

- Italian Athletics Championships
  - 10,000 m walk tracks: 2017 (1)
  - 10 km walk road: 2015 (1)
  - 20 km walk road: 2012, 2016, 2021 (3)
  - 50 km walk road: 2011, 2012, 2015 (3)
- Italian Athletics Indoor Championships
  - 5000 m walk tracks: 2021 (1)

== See also ==
- Italy at the IAAF World Race Walking Cup
- Italy at the European Race Walking Cup
