= Zhang Jun (race walker) =

Chinese racewalker (born 1998)

Personal information
- Nationality: Chinese
- Born: 20 July 1998 (age 28)

Sport
- Sport: Athletics
- Event: Racewalking
Medal record
Men's athletics
Representing China
Asian Games
| Gold medal – first place | 2022 Hangzhou | 20 km walk |

Zhang Jun (Chinese: 张•俊; born 20 July 1998) is a Chinese racewalking athlete. He qualified to represent China at the 2020 Summer Olympics in Tokyo 2021, competing in men's 20 kilometres walk.
