= Mert Atlı =

Turkish racewalker

Personal information
- Nationality: Turkey
- Born: 23 July 1993 (age 32) Balıkesir, Turkey
- Height: 1.91 m (6 ft 3 in)
- Weight: 70 kg (150 lb)

Sport
- Sport: Race walker
- Club: Ayvalık Atletizm SK

Mert Atlı (born 23 July 1993 in Balıkesir) is a Turkish racewalker. He is a member of Ayvalık Atletizm SK.

He earned a quota spot for 2016 Summer Olympics with his performance of placing 6th in the 20 km race walk event at the IAAF Race Walking Challenge in Dudince, Slovakia.
