= Pavel Parshin =

Soviet sailor (born 1919)

Personal information
- Nationality: Soviet
- Born: 22 December 1919 Saint Petersburg, Russia
- Died: 19 October 1991 (aged 71)

Sport
- Sport: Sailing

Pavel Parshin (22 December 1919 – 19 October 1991) was a Soviet sailor. He competed in the 5.5 Metre event at the 1960 Summer Olympics.
