= Leo Köpp =

German racewalker

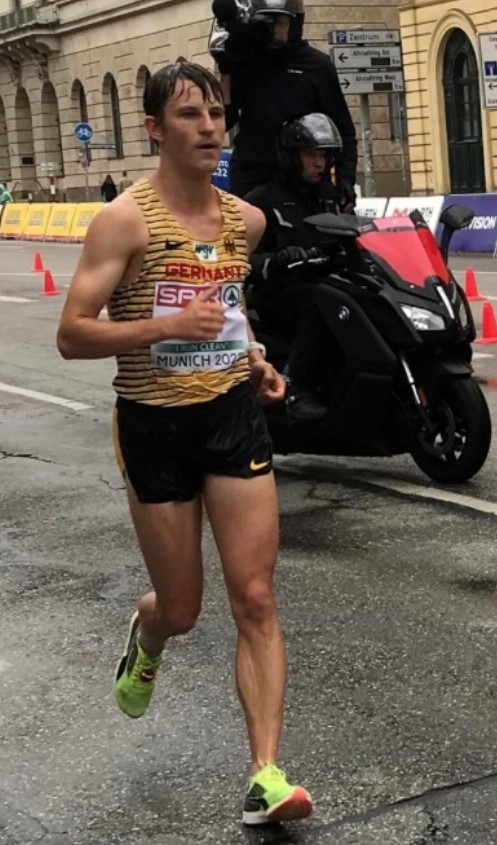
- Köpp in 2022

Personal information
- Nationality: German
- Born: 23 May 1998 (age 28)

Sport
- Sport: Athletics
- Event: Racewalking

Leo Köpp (born 23 May 1998) is a German racewalking athlete. He represented Germany at the 2020 Summer Olympics in Tokyo 2021, competing in men's 20 kilometres walk.

His biggest solo success so far was a victory at the 2017 IAAF U20 Europacup in Poděbrady. He also won a bronze medal with his team at the 2021 European Race Walking Team Championships, again held in Poděbrady.

He is currently an athlete of the athletics club LG Nord Berlin.
