= Cai Zelin =

Chinese racewalker (born 1991)

Personal information
- Born: 11 April 1991 (age 35) Dali, Yunnan
- Height: 1.72 m (5 ft 8 in)
- Weight: 55 kg (121 lb)

Sport
- Country: China
- Sport: Athletics
- Event: 20km Race Walk
Medal record
Racewalking
Representing the China
Olympic Games
Silver medal – second place	2016 Rio de Janeiro	20 km walk

Cai Zelin (simplified Chinese: 蔡泽林; traditional Chinese: 蔡澤林; pinyin: Cài Zélín, born 11 April 1991, in Huize, Yunnan) is a Chinese male racewalker. He finished 4th at the 20 km walk during the 2012 London Olympics, and won the silver medal at the 2016 Rio Olympics. He finished 5th at the 2015 World Championships in the 20 km race walk. In 2019, he competed in the men's 20 kilometres walk at the 2019 World Athletics Championships held in Doha, Qatar. He did not finish his race.

== See also ==
- China at the 2012 Summer Olympics - Athletics
- Athletics at the 2012 Summer Olympics – Men's 20 kilometres walk
