= Koki Ikeda =

Japanese racewalker (born 1998)

Personal information
- Nationality: Japanese
- Born: 3 May 1998 (age 28) Hamamatsu, Shizuoka Prefecture, Japan

Sport
- Sport: Athletics
- Event: Race walking
Medal record
Men's athletics
Representing Japan
Olympic Games
Silver medal – second place	2020 Tokyo	20 km walk
World Championships
Silver medal – second place	2022 Eugene	20 km walk
World Team Championships
Silver medal – second place	2024 Antalya	Marathon walk (mixed relay)
Summer Universiade
Gold medal – first place	2019 Naples	20 km walk

Koki Ikeda (池田 向希, Ikeda Kōki; born 3 May 1998) is a Japanese racewalking athlete. He studied at Toyo University.

Ikeda won a bronze medal in 20 kilometres race walk at the 2019 Asian Race Walking Championships in Nomi. He represented Japan at the 2019 World Athletics Championships, competing in 20 kilometres walk. He won a silver medal at 2020 Summer Olympics and the 2022 World Athletics Championships in the same event.

In October 2026, the Court of Arbitration for Sport overturned a decision by the Athletics Integrity Unit made in February 2025 which had found that Ikeda had committed anti-doping violations due to irregularities in his Athlete Biological Passport. The proposed four-year ban was rescinded and Ikeda was cleared of breaching anti-doping rules.

== See also ==
- 2019 IAAF World Rankings
