= Şahin Şenoduncu =

Turkish racewalker

Personal information
- Nationality: Turkish
- Born: 24 April 1994 (age 32) Ayvalık, Balıkesirl, Turkey

Sport
- Sport: Athletics
- Event: Race walking
Medal record
Men's Race walking
Representing Turkey
Balkan Championships
Gold medal – first place	2021 Antalya	20 km walk
Silver medal – second place	2019 Alexandroupoli	20 km walk

Şahin Şenoduncu (born 24 April 1994) is a Turkish racewalking athlete.

At the 2019 Balkan Race Walking Championship held in Alexandroupoli, Greece, Şenoduncu won the silver medal. He became champion at the 2021 Balkan Race Walking Championship in Antalya, Turkey. Representing Turkey at the 2020 Summer Olympics, he placed 34th in 20 km walk.
