= Aurélien Quinion =

French athlete (born 1993)

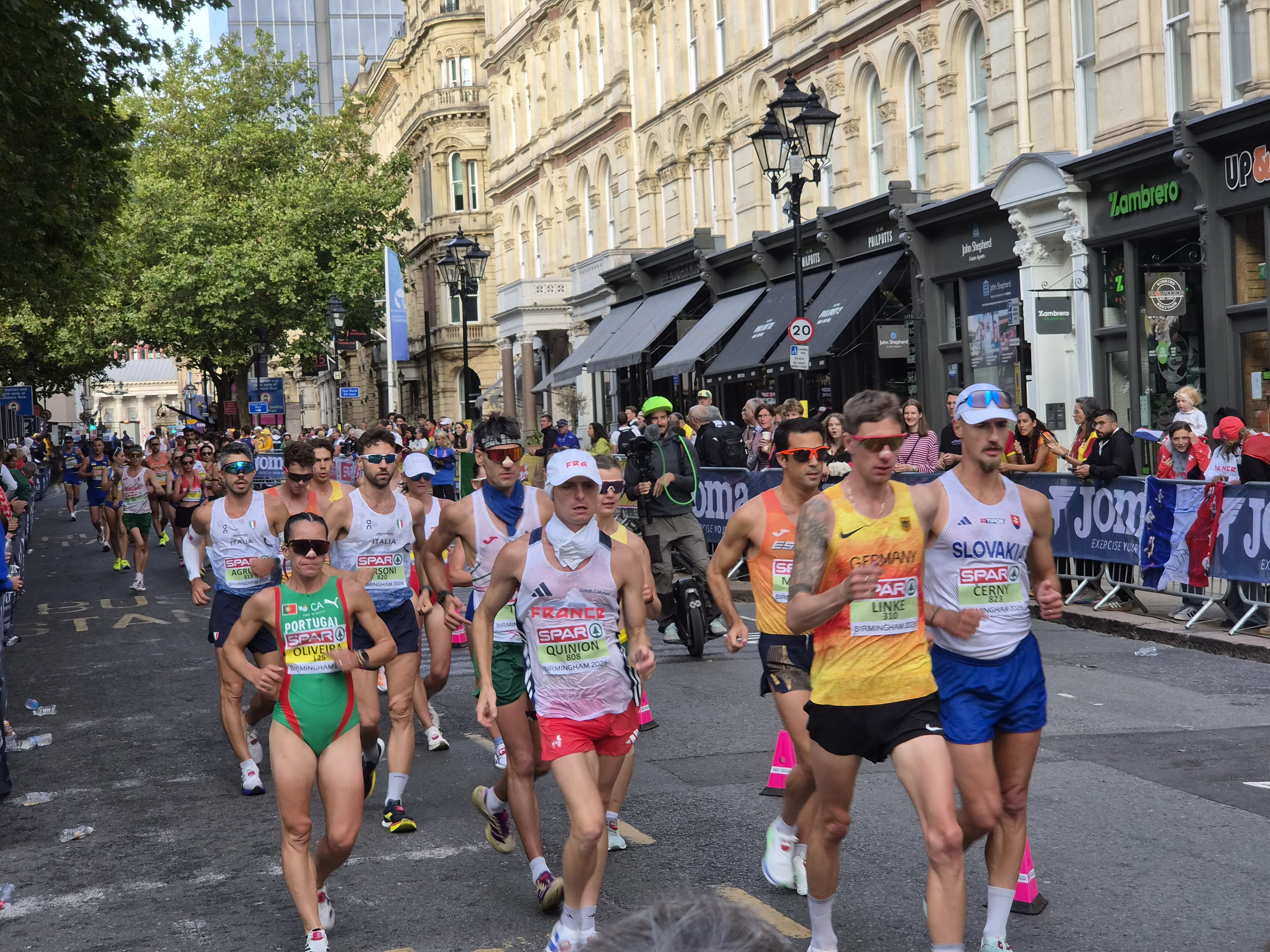
- Quinion in 2026

Personal information
- Born: 27 January 1993 (age 33) Paris, France
- Height: 180 cm (5 ft 11 in)
- Weight: 63 kg (139 lb)

Sport
- Country: France
- Sport: Athletics
- Event: Race Walking
Medal record
Men's athletics
Representing France
European Championships
Bronze medal – third place	2026 Birmingham	Marathon walk

Aurélien Quinion (born 27 January 1993) is a French race-walker. He won the bronze medal at the 2026 European Athletics Championships in the marathon race walk. He is a multiple-time national champion and competed at the 2024 Olympic Games and the 2022, 2023 and 2025 World Athletics Championships.

== Biography ==
He won the French Indoor Athletics Championships in the 5000 metres race walk in Miramas in February 2021. He placed fourteenth over 20 km at the 2022 World Athletics Championships, in Eugene, Oregon.

In Val-de-Reuil on 11 February 2023, he won won the French Indoor Race Walking Championships in the 5000 metres race walk. The following month, on 12 March, he won the 20km event at the French Race Walking Championships in Aix-les-Bains. He competed at the 2023 World Athletics Championships in Budapest, Hungary.

He competed at the 2024 Olympic Games in Paris, France, placing ninth in the 20km race walk in a personal best time of 1:19:56. The race came shortly after he became a father, with his daughter being born six hours before the start of the race, and he came directly from the hospital where his wife gave birth in order to compete.

He won the 35km race at the French Race Walking Championships In Les Mureaux on 23 March 2025. He placed fourth in the 20km race walk at the 2025 World Athletics Championships in Tokyo, Japan. Also at the championships, he placed fifth in the 35km race walk.

On 15 August 2026, Quinion won the bronze medal in the marathon race walk at the 2026 European Athletics Championships in Birmingham, England in a new personal best time of 2:59:29.
