= Chen Ding =

Chinese racewalker (born 1992)

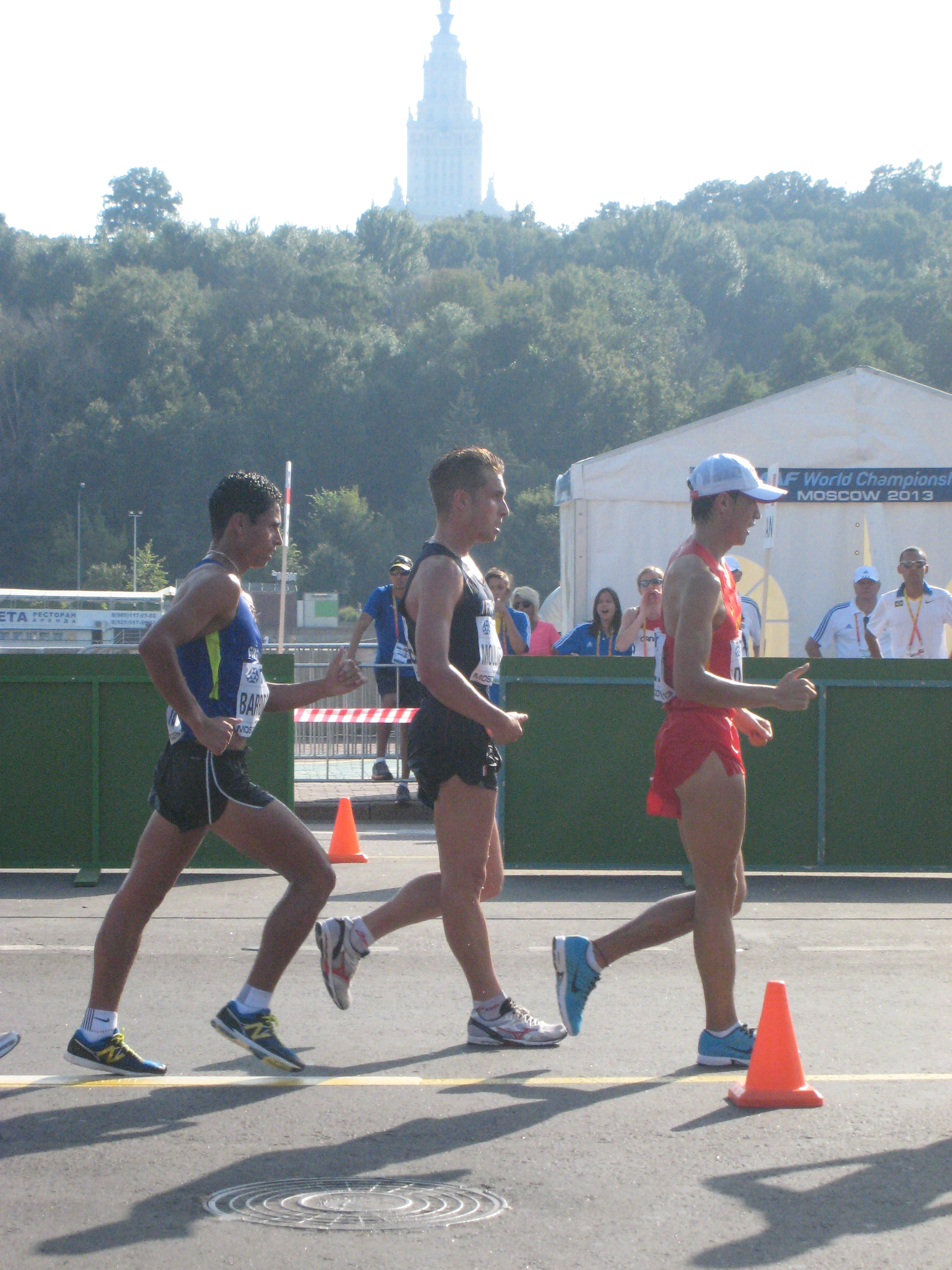
- 2013 IAAF World Championships in Moscow. 20 km walk men. Erick Barrondo (GUA), Chen Ding (CHN), Bertrand Moulinet (FRA)

Personal information
- Native name: 陈定
- Nationality: Chinese
- Born: August 5, 1992 (age 33) Baoshan, Yunnan Province
- Height: 180 cm (5 ft 11 in)
- Weight: 62 kg (137 lb)

Sport
- Country: China
- Sport: Track and field
- Event: 20 km racewalk
- Club: Guangdong Province Athletic Team
- Coached by: Sandro Damilano

Achievements and titles
- Olympic finals: 2012 Summer Olympics: Men's 20 kilometres walk – Gold
Medal record
Men's athletics
Representing China
Olympic Games
Gold medal – first place	2012 London	20 km walk
World Championships
Gold medal – first place	2013 Moscow	20 km walk
- Updated on 27 March 2019

Chen Ding (Chinese: 陈定; born August 5, 1992, in Baoshan, Yunnan, China) is a Chinese racewalker who won a gold medal in the 2012 Summer Olympics in London, United Kingdom. He finished the race in 1:18:46, a new Olympic record. He also won a gold medal in the 2013 World Championships in Athletics after the original gold medalist was disqualified for doping.

== Career ==
=== 2012 London Olympics ===
In the 2012 London Games, Chen became the first Chinese male athlete ever to win an Olympic gold medal in 20 km racewalk event. He is also the second Chinese male athlete to win a gold medal in any athletic event of the Olympics, after Liu Xiang's gold in 110 m hurdles at the 2004 Summer Olympics in Athens. Chen finished the race in 1:18:46 and established a new Olympic record. He achieved this feat one day before his birthday and considered it as a "wonderful gift". His teammates Wang Zhen and Cai Zelin finished third and fourth, with Guatemala's Erick Barrondo in second.

== See also ==
- China at the 2012 Summer Olympics - Athletics
- Athletics at the 2012 Summer Olympics – Men's 20 kilometres walk
