= Nils Brembach =

German racewalker

Personal information
- Born: 23 February 1993 (age 33)
- Height: 184 cm (6 ft 0 in)
- Weight: 70 kg (154 lb)

Sport
- Country: Germany
- Sport: Track and field
- Event: racewalking
- Updated on 29 August 2015

Nils Brembach (born 23 February 1993) is a German racewalker. He competed in the 20 kilometres walk event at the 2015 World Championships in Athletics in Beijing, China. At the 2016 Summer Olympics, he competed in the men's 20 km walk. He finished in 38th place with a time of 1:23:46. In 2019, he competed in the men's 20 kilometres walk at the 2019 World Athletics Championships held in Doha, Qatar. He did not finish his race.

== See also ==
- Germany at the 2015 World Championships in Athletics
