= Diego García (race walker) =

Spanish racewalker (born 1996)

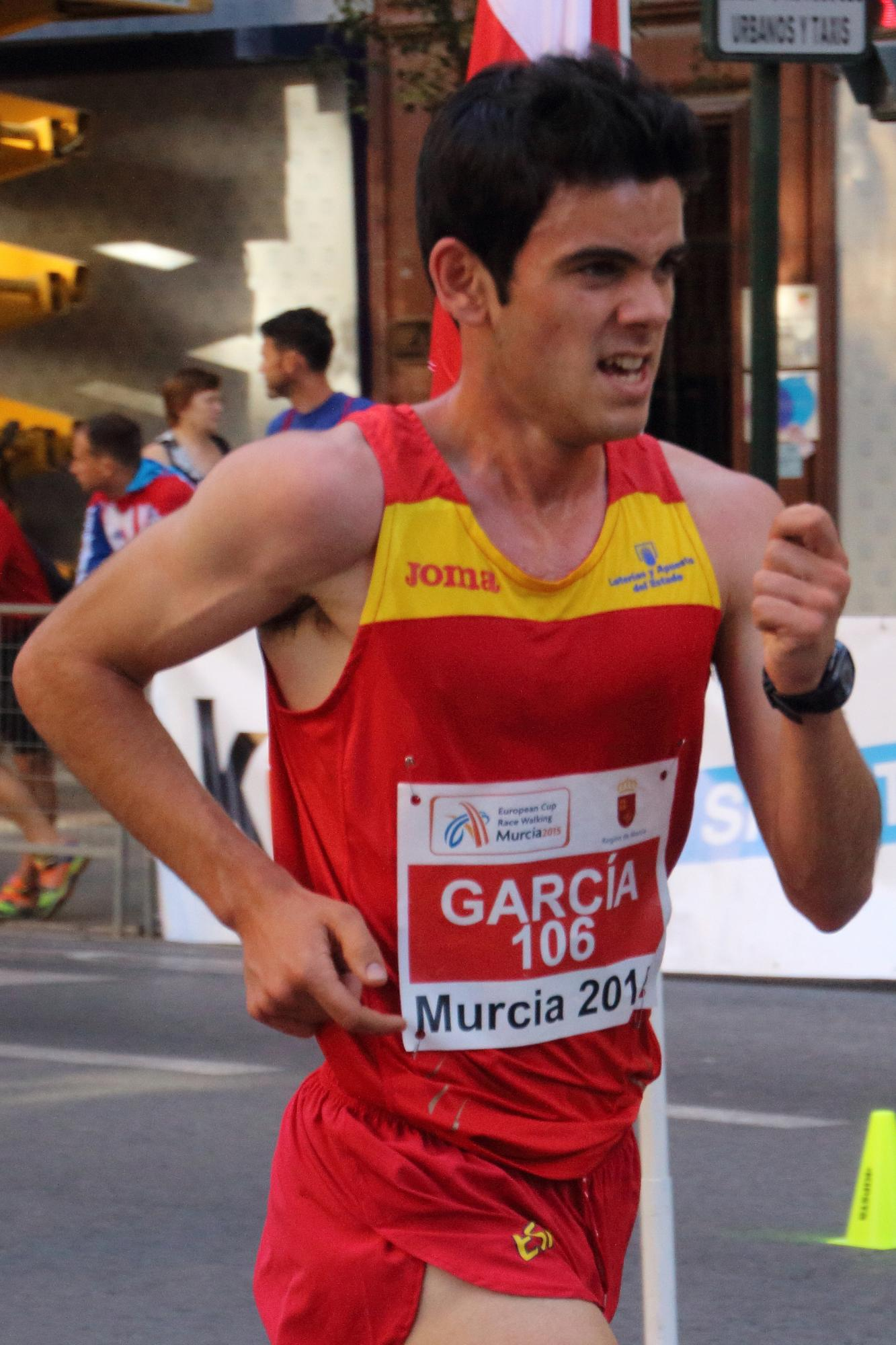
- García at 2015 Copa de Europa

Personal information
- Full name: Diego García Carrera
- Nationality: Spanish
- Born: 19 January 1996 (age 30) Madrid, Spain
- Height: 174 cm (5 ft 9 in)
- Weight: 60 kg (132 lb)

Sport
- Country: Spain
- Sport: Track and field
- Event: racewalking
Medal record
European Championships
Silver medal – second place	2018 Berlin	20 km walk
Bronze medal – third place	2022 Munich	20 km walk
- Updated on 21 August 2018

Diego García Carrera (born 19 January 1996) is a male Spanish racewalker. He competed in the 20 kilometres walk event at the 2018 European Athletics Championships in Berlin, winning the silver medal.

In 2017, he won the gold medal in the men's 20 kilometres walk at the 2017 European Athletics U23 Championships held in Bydgoszcz, Poland.

He was also the winner of the IAAF Race Walking Challenge in 2018.

In 2019, he competed in the men's 20 kilometres walk at the 2019 World Athletics Championships held in Doha, Qatar. He finished in 35th place.

== See also ==
- Spain at the 2015 World Championships in Athletics
- Spain at the 2018 European Athletics Championships
