= Ecuador at the 2025 World Athletics Championships =

- Flag of Ecuador
- WA code: ECU

in Tokyo, Japan 13 September 2025 – 21 September 2025
- Competitors: 14 (6 men and 8 women)
- Medals Ranked 17th: Gold 1 Silver 0 Bronze 1 Total 2

World Athletics Championships appearances
- 1983; 1987; 1991; 1993; 1995; 1997; 1999; 2001; 2003; 2005; 2007; 2009; 2011; 2013; 2015; 2017; 2019; 2022; 2023; 2025

Ecuador competed at the 2025 World Athletics Championships in Tokyo, Japan, from 13 to 21 September 2025.

== Medallists ==
| Medal | Athlete | Event | Date |
|---|---|---|---|
| Gold | Juleisy Angulo | Women's javelin throw | September 20 |
| Bronze | Paula Milena Torres | Women's 35 kilometres walk | September 13 |

== Results ==
Ecuador entered 6 male and 8 female athletes to the championships.

Key

- Q = Qualified for the next round
- q = Qualified for the next round as a fastest loser or, in field events, by position without achieving the qualifying target
- NR = National record
- PB = Personal best
- SB = Season best
- N/A = Round not applicable for the event

=== Men ===
Track and road events

| Athlete | Event | Final | |
| Athlete | Event | Result | Rank |
|---|---|---|---|
| Segundo Jami | Marathon | 2:28:07 | 60 |
| David Hurtado | 20 kilometres walk | 1:21:18 | 19 |
| Jordy Jiménez | 20 kilometres walk | 1:20:43 | 15 |
| David Hurtado | 35 kilometres walk | 2:32:35 | 9 |
| Xavier Mena | 35 kilometres walk | DNF | |
| Oscar Patín | 35 kilometres walk | 2:43:48 | 30 |

Field events

| Athlete | Event | Qualification | | Final | |
| Athlete | Event | Distance | Position | Distance | Position |
|---|---|---|---|---|---|
| Juan José Caicedo | Discus throw | 60.94 | 25 | Did not advance | |

=== Women ===
Track and road events

| Athlete | Event | Heats | | Semifinal | | Final | |
| Athlete | Event | Result | Rank | Result | Rank | Result | Rank |
|---|---|---|---|---|---|---|---|
| Anahí Suárez | 200 metres | 23.50 | 8 | Did not advance | | | |
| Mary Zenaida Granja | Marathon | —N/a | | | | 2:43:02 | 46 |
| Silvia Ortiz | Marathon | —N/a | | | | 2:37:22 SB | 35 |
| Magaly Bonilla | 20 kilometres walk | —N/a | | | | 1:30:39 SB | 20 |
| Johana Ordóñez | 20 kilometres walk | —N/a | | | | Did not start | |
| Paula Milena Torres | 20 kilometres walk | —N/a | | | | 1:26:18 PB | 4 |
| Karla Jaramillo | 35 kilometres walk | —N/a | | | | 3:05:03 | 23 |
| Johana Ordóñez | 35 kilometres walk | —N/a | | | | Did not finish | |
| Paula Milena Torres | 35 kilometres walk | —N/a | | | | 2:42:24 NR | 3rd place, bronze medalist(s) |

Field events

| Athlete | Event | Qualification | | Final | |
| Athlete | Event | Distance | Position | Distance | Position |
|---|---|---|---|---|---|
| Juleisy Angulo | Javelin throw | 63.25 NR | 4 Q | 65.12 NR | 1st place, gold medalist(s) |
