= 2023 World Athletics Championships – Women's 35 kilometres walk =

Women's 35 kilometres walk at the 2023 World Championships
- Venue: National Athletics Centre
- Dates: 24 August
- Competitors: 47 from 22 nations
- Winning time: 2:38:40 CR

Medalists
gold medal	María Pérez	Spain
silver medal	Kimberly García	Peru
bronze medal	Antigoni Drisbioti	Greece

The women's 35 kilometres walk at the 2023 World Athletics Championships was held on National Athletics Centre in Budapest on 24 August 2023. 47 athletes from 22 nations entered to the event.

== Records ==
Before the competition records were as follows:

Record	Athlete & Nat.	Perf.	Location	Date
World record	María Pérez (ESP)	2:37:15	Poděbrady, Czech Republic	21 May 2023
Championship record	Kimberly García (PER)	2:39:16	Eugene, United States	22 July 2022
World Leading	Klavdiya Afanasyeva (RUS)	2:37:11	Saransk, Russia	20 May 2023
African Record	Esther Steenkamp (RSA)	3:42:04	Cape Town, South Africa	15 January 2022
Asian Record	Liu Hong (CHN)	2:38:42	Wajima, Japan	16 April 2023
North, Central American and Caribbean record	Robyn Stevens (USA)	2:49:29	Dudince, Slovakia	23 April 2022
South American Record	Kimberly García (PER)	2:37:44	Dudince, Slovakia	25 March 2023
European Record	María Pérez (ESP)	2:37:15	Poděbrady, Czech Republic	21 May 2023
Oceanian record	Rebecca Henderson (AUS)	2:47:54	Melbourne, Australia	21 May 2023

The following records were set at the competition:

Record	Perf.	Athlete	Nat.	Date
Championship record	2:38:40	María Pérez	ESP	24 Aug 2023

== Qualification standard ==
The standard to qualify automatically for entry was 2:51:30.

== Schedule ==
The event schedule, in local time (UTC+2), was as follows:

Date	Time	Round
24 August	07:00	Final

== Results ==
The race was started at 07:00. The results were as follows:

Rank	Name	Nationality	Time	Warnings	Notes
1st place, gold medalist(s)	María Pérez	Spain	2:38:40	>	CR
2nd place, silver medalist(s)	Kimberly García	Peru	2:40:52	>	
3rd place, bronze medalist(s)	Antigoni Drisbioti	Greece	2:43:22	~	SB
4	Viviane Lyra	Brazil	2:44:40		NR
5	Cristina Montesinos	Spain	2:45:32		PB
6	Evelyn Inga	Peru	2:46:18		PB
7	Serena Sonoda	Japan	2:46:32		
8	Olga Chojecka	Poland	2:46:48	~	PB
9	Magaly Bonilla	Ecuador	2:47:09		
10	Tereza Ďurdiaková	Czech Republic	2:49:06	~	NR
11	Bai Xueying	China	2:49:34		
12	Alejandra Ortega	Mexico	2:50:44		NR
13	Raquel González	Spain	2:51:53		
14	Masumi Fuchise	Japan	2:52:57	>	PB
15	Federica Curiazzi	Italy	2:53:27		
16	Victoría Madarász	Hungary	2:53:30		SB
17	Johana Ordóňez	Ecuador	2:54:58		SB
18	Agnieszka Ellward	Poland	2:56:51		PB
19	Sara Vitiello	Italy	2:57:00		
20	Vasylyna Sydorchuk	Ukraine	2:57:24	>>>	
21	Allanah Pitcher	Australia	2:57:55	>	
22	Rita Récsei	Hungary	2:59:37		
23	Arabelly Orjuela	Colombia	2:59:58	~	SB
24	Maria Michta-Coffey	United States	3:01:22		
25	Mária Katerinka Czaková	Slovakia	3:01:53		PB
26	Kyriaki Filtisakou	Greece	3:02:16		
27	Nicole Colombi	Italy	3:02:29	>>>	
28	Hana Burzalová	Slovakia	3:02:47		SB
29	Bianca Maria Dittrich	Germany	3:03:05		
30	Ilse Guerrero	Mexico	3:03:41		SB
31	Ema Hačundová	Slovakia	3:05:43		SB
32	Karla Jaramillo	Ecuador	3:05:55		
33	Austėja Kavaliauskaitė	Lithuania	3:08:11	>	
34	Alina Tsvilii	Ukraine	3:09:23	>	
35	Miranda Melville	United States	3:09:41	>>>	
36	Elianay Pereira	Brazil	3:16:11		SB
	Mihaela Acatrinei	Romania	DNF		
	Olga Fiaska	Greece	DNF	>>	
	Inês Henriques	Portugal	DNF		
	Li Maocuo	China	DNF		
	Qieyang Shijie	China	DNF		
	Ana Veronica Rodean	Romania	DNF		
	Erica Sena	Brazil	DNF	>	
	Galina Yakusheva	Kazakhstan	DNF		
	Stephanie Casey	United States	DQ	>>>>	TR54.7.5
	Katarzyna Zdziebło	Poland	DQ	~~~>	TR54.7.5
	Rebecca Henderson	Australia	DNS		

Key:	~ Red card for loss of contact	> Red card for bent knee	TR54.7.5: Disqualified by Rule TR54.7.5 (4 red cards)
