= Mexico at the 2025 World Athletics Championships =

- Flag of Mexico
- WA code: MEX

in Tokyo, Japan 13 September 2025 – 21 September 2025
- Competitors: 19 (11 men and 8 women)
- Medals Ranked 24th: Gold 0 Silver 2 Bronze 0 Total 2

World Athletics Championships appearances
- 1976; 1980; 1983; 1987; 1991; 1993; 1995; 1997; 1999; 2001; 2003; 2005; 2007; 2009; 2011; 2013; 2015; 2017; 2019; 2022; 2023; 2025

Mexico competed at the 2025 World Athletics Championships in Tokyo, Japan, from 13 to 21 September 2025. The country ended with 2 silver medals, including the first ever medal in shot put.

== Medalists ==
Medal	Athlete	Event	Date
2nd place, silver medalist(s)	Uziel Muñoz	Men's Shot Put	13 September
2nd place, silver medalist(s)	Alegna González	Women's 20 Km Walk	20 September

== Results ==
Mexico entered 19 athletes to the championships: 8 women and 11 men.

Key

- Q = Qualified for the next round
- q = Qualified for the next round as a fastest loser or, in field events, by position without achieving the qualifying target
- AR= Area record
- NR = National record
- PB = Personal best
- SB = Season best
- N/A = Round not applicable for the event
- Rank before final is for each heat.

=== Men ===
Track and road events

Athlete	Event	Heat		Semifinal		Final	
Athlete	Event	Result	Rank	Result	Rank	Result	Rank
Eduardo Herrera	5,000 m	13:51.29	17	—N/a		Did not advance	35
Marcelo Laguera	Marathon	—N/a				2:20:56	48
Juan Pacheco	Marathon	—N/a				DNF	
Noel Chama	20 Km Walk	—N/a				1:23:41	33
José Luis Doctor	20 Km Walk	—N/a				DSQ	
Ricardo Ortiz	20 Km Walk	—N/a				1:20:36	12
José Luis Doctor	35 Km Walk	—N/a				DNF	
Andrés Olivas	35 Km Walk	—N/a				DNF	
Julio César Salazar	35 Km Walk	—N/a				DNF	

Field events

Athlete	Event	Qualification		Final	
Athlete	Event	Distance	Position	Distance	Position
Erick Portillo	High Jump	2.21	18	Did not advance	
Edgar Rivera	High Jump	2.21	=14	Did not advance	
Uziel Munoz	Shot Put	20.77	9 q	21.97 NR	2nd place, silver medalist(s)

=== Women ===
Track and road events

Athlete	Event	Heat		Semifinal		Final	
Athlete	Event	Result	Rank	Result	Rank	Result	Rank
Miriam Sánchez	200 m	23.01	4 q	23.12	8	Did not advance	23
Margarita Hernández	Marathon	—N/a				3:02:26	63
Isabel Oropeza	Marathon	—N/a				2:43:53 SB	47
Alegna González	20 Km Walk	—N/a				1:26:06 AR, NR	2nd place, silver medalist(s)
Ilse Guerrero	20 Km Walk	—N/a				1:35:20	35
Alejandra Ortega	20 Km Walk	—N/a				1:34:18 SB	31
Alegna González	35 Km Walk	—N/a				DNS	
Valeria Ortuño	35 Km Walk	—N/a				DNF	
Ximena Serrano	35 Km Walk	—N/a				DNF	
