= 2025 World Athletics Championships – Women's 20 kilometres walk =

Women's 20 kilometres walk at the 2025 World Athletics Championships
- Venue: National Stadium
- Location: Tokyo, Japan
- Dates: 20 September
- Competitors: 49 from 24 nations
- Winning time: 1:25:54 SB

Medalists
gold medal	María Pérez	Spain
silver medal	Alegna González	Mexico
bronze medal	Nanako Fujii	Japan

The women's 20 kilometres walk at the 2025 World Athletics Championships was held at the National Stadium in Tokyo on 20 September 2025.

== Records ==
Before the competition records were as follows:

Record	Athlete & Nat.	Perf.	Location	Date
World Record	Yang Jiayu (CHN)	1:23:49	Huangshan, China	20 March 2021
Championship Record	Olimpiada Ivanova (RUS)	1:25:41	Helsinki, Finland	7 August 2005
World Leading	Elvira Chepareva (RUS)	1:24:20	Sochi, Russia	24 February 2025
African Record	Grace Wanjiru Njue (KEN)	1:30:40	Nairobi, Kenya	6 June 2018
Asian Record	Yang Jiayu (CHN)	1:23:49	Huangshan, China	20 March 2021
European Record	Vera Sokolova (RUS)	1:25:08	Sochi, Russia	26 February 2011
North, Central American and Caribbean Record	Lupita González (MEX)	1:26:17	Rome, Italy	7 May 2016
Oceanian Record	Jemima Montag (AUS)	1:26:25	Paris, France	1 August 2024
South American Record	Glenda Morejón (ECU)	1:25:29	La Coruña, Spain	8 June 2019

== Qualification standard ==
The standard to qualify automatically for entry was 1:29:00.

== Schedule ==
The event schedule, in local time (UTC+9), was as follows:

Date	Time	Round
20 September	07:30	Final

== Results ==
The race was started on 20 September at 7:30.

Place	Athlete	Nation	Time	Warnings	Notes
1st place, gold medalist(s)	María Pérez	Spain	1:25:54		SB
2nd place, silver medalist(s)	Alegna González	Mexico	1:26:06		AR
3rd place, bronze medalist(s)	Nanako Fujii	Japan	1:26:18	~ ~	NR
4	Paula Milena Torres	Ecuador	1:26:18	~	PB
5	Kimberly García	Peru	1:26:22		NR
6	Yang Jiayu	China	1:27:16	~	SB
7	Antía Chamosa	Spain	1:27:55		PB
8	Wu Quanming	China	1:28:08	~	
9	Ma Li	China	1:28:52	~	
10	Mary Luz Andía	Peru	1:28:52		
11	Pauline Stey	France	1:28:52		
12	Viviane Lyra	Brazil	1:29:02	~	
13	Lyudmyla Olyanovska	Ukraine	1:29:16		
14	Katarzyna Zdziebło	Poland	1:29:31		
15	Alexandrina Mihai	Italy	1:29:44	~ ~	
16	Antigoni Drisbioti	Greece	1:29:47	~ >	
17	Federica Curiazzi	Italy	1:29:48	~	
18	Kumiko Okada	Japan	1:30:12		
19	Mariia Sakharuk	Ukraine	1:30:38	~ ~	
20	Magaly Bonilla	Ecuador	1:30:39	~ ~	SB
21	Rebecca Henderson	Australia	1:31:05		
22	Paula Juárez	Spain	1:31:50		
23	Yasmina Toxanbayeva	Kazakhstan	1:31:51		
24	Hanna Shevchuk	Ukraine	1:32:15	~	
25	Hana Burzalová	Slovakia	1:32:28		
26	Rachelle de Orbeta	Puerto Rico	1:32:47		SB
27	Lauren Harris	United States	1:32:50	~	PB
28	Vitória Oliveira	Portugal	1:33:02		
29	Clémence Beretta	France	1:33:14	~	
30	Evelyn Inga	Peru	1:33:29	~ ~ ~ PZ	
31	Alejandra Ortega	Mexico	1:34:18	~	SB
32	Gabriela de Sousa	Brazil	1:34:28		SB
33	Elizabeth McMillen	Australia	1:34:58	~	
34	Christina Papadopoulou	Greece	1:35:05	>	SB
35	Ilse Guerrero	Mexico	1:35:20		
36	Tiziana Spiller	Hungary	1:35:32		
37	Ayane Yanai	Japan	1:35:44		
38	Jekaterina Mirotvortseva	Estonia	1:36:25		
39	Panayiota Tsinopoulou	Greece	1:37:40	~ > ~ PZ	SB
40	Lucy Mendoza	Colombia	1:38:05		
41	Laura Chalarca	Colombia	1:42:08		
	Meryem Bekmez	Turkey	DNF	~	
	Alexandra Griffin	Australia	DNF	>	
	Sintayehu Masire	Ethiopia	DNF	~ ~	
	Antonella Palmisano	Italy	DNF		
	Érica de Sena	Brazil	DNF		
	Mirna Ortiz	Guatemala	DQ	~ ~ > >	
	Peng Li	China	DQ	~ ~ ~ ~	
	Johana Ordóñez	Ecuador	DNS		

Key:	~ Red card for loss of contact	> Red card for bent knee	PZ 3.5 min. Penalty Zone	TR54.7.5: Disqualified by Rule TR54.7.5 (4 red cards)
