= 2025 World Athletics Championships – Men's 35 kilometres walk =

Men's 35 kilometres walk at the 2025 World Athletics Championships
- Venue: National Stadium
- Location: Tokyo, Japan
- Dates: 13 September
- Competitors: 50 from 26 nations
- Winning time: 2:28:22

Medalists
gold medal	Evan Dunfee	Canada
silver medal	Caio Bonfim	Brazil
bronze medal	Hayato Katsuki	Japan

The men's 35 kilometres walk at the 2025 World Athletics Championships was held at the National Stadium in Tokyo on 13 September 2025.

== Summary ==
Álvaro Martín did not return to defend his title having retired after being part of the Spanish Gold medal race walk relay. Earlier in the year, Olympic champion Massimo Stano set the world record in the event but a hamstring injury prevented his participation.

In the closing stages of the 2016 Olympics, Japanese walker Hirooki Arai elbowed his way past Evan Dunfee, wrecking his stride at that critical moment. Arai took third but was later disqualified for interference. That DQ was overturned on appeal, denying Dunfee an Olympic medal. Five years later, Dunfee got his Olympic bronze medal in Japan. Four years later, Dunfee is back in Japan.

The race quickly formed a pack of 23 walkers. By 10k, it had whittled down to 13 with Japanese walkers Hayato Katsuki and Masatora Kawano on the front satisfying the home crowd. Around 16K, only David Hurtado was walking with the leading Japanese though four or five others were trying to stay in the same zip code including Caio Bonfim, Aurélien Quinion and Dunfee. That group stayed in contention through 26K when things began to shake up. Hurtado began to push the pace. Kawano tried to go with him but Katsuki fell slightly off the pace. Then Kawano couldn't stay with him. Hurtado had broken the race and was all alone. Then he wasn't. Hurtado picked up enough DQ cards to earn a trip to the penalty box officially called the Penalty Zone in race walking. He got to rejoin the race 3 and a half minutes later, finishing ninth only 3 minutes and 17 seconds behind the winner. With Hurtado's exit, Kawano found himself in the lead, about 15 seconds ahead of Katsuki but Dunfee was gaining with Bonfim and Zhou Yingcheng gaining. Within a lap and a half of Hurtado's pause, Dunfee had passed both Japanese and was pulling away. Bonfim caught Kawano with just over a lap to go. Kawano's answer was to slow down. Over the final lap Dunfee struggled but had enough of a cushion to confidently pick up a Canadian flag to display at the finish. Bonfim gained over 30 seconds on Dunfee through the last lap and a half, but still finished 33 seconds behind. Kawano fell back through the field, eventually finishing 18th while Katsuki held off Zhou for the bronze.

== Records ==
Before the competition records were as follows:

Record	Athlete & Nat.	Perf.	Location	Date
World Record	Massimo Stano (ITA)	2:20:43	Poděbrady, Czech Republic	18 May 2025
Championship Record	Massimo Stano (ITA)	2:23:14	Eugene, United States	24 July 2022
World Leading	Massimo Stano (ITA)	2:20:43	Poděbrady, Czech Republic	18 May 2025
African Record	Wayne Snyman (RSA)	2:31:15	Eugene, United States	24 July 2022
Asian Record	Masatora Kawano (JPN)	2:21:47	Takahata, Japan	18 October 1997
European Record	Massimo Stano (ITA)	2:20:43	Poděbrady, Czech Republic	18 May 2025
North, Central American and Caribbean Record	Evan Dunfee (CAN)	2:21:40	Dudince, Slovakia	22 March 2025
Oceanian Record	Rhydian Cowley (AUS)	2:25:21	Nomi, Japan	16 March 2025
South American Record	Brian Pintado (ECU)	2:24:34	Budapest, Hungary	24 August 2023

== Qualification standard ==
The standard to qualify automatically for entry was 2:28:00.

== Schedule ==
The event schedule, in local time (UTC+9), was as follows:

Date	Time	Round
13 September	07:30	Final

== Results ==
The race was started on 13 September at 7:30.

Place	Athlete	Nation	Time	Warnings	Notes
1st place, gold medalist(s)	Evan Dunfee	Canada	2:28:22		
2nd place, silver medalist(s)	Caio Bonfim	Brazil	2:28:55	~	SB
3rd place, bronze medalist(s)	Hayato Katsuki	Japan	2:29:16		
4	Zhou Yingcheng	China	2:29:31		
5	Aurélien Quinion	France	2:30:24		
6	Daniel Chamosa	Spain	2:30:42	~	
7	Dominik Černý	Slovakia	2:31:17		
8	Riccardo Orsoni	Italy	2:31:39		
9	David Hurtado	Ecuador	2:32:35	~ ~ ~ PZ	
10	Maher Ben Hlima	Poland	2:33:08	>	
11	Rhydian Cowley	Australia	2:33:28	~	
12	Miguel Ángel López	Spain	2:33:45		
13	Manuel Bermúdez	Spain	2:35:19		
14	Christopher Linke	Germany	2:36:10		
15	Matheus Correa	Brazil	2:36:35	~	PB
16	Jonathan Hilbert	Germany	2:36:47		
17	Johannes Frenzl	Germany	2:36:47		
18	Masatora Kawano	Japan	2:37:15	~ >	SB
19	Perseus Karlström	Sweden	2:37:47		
20	João Vieira	Portugal	2:38:20		
21	Kévin Campion	France	2:39:12		
22	Bence Venyercsán	Hungary	2:39:14	~ ~	
23	Sandeep Kumar	India	2:39:15	>	
24	Raivo Saulgriezis	Latvia	2:40:19		
25	Will Thompson	Australia	2:40:19	~ ~	SB
26	Satoshi Maruo	Japan	2:40:29		
27	Max Batista Gonçalves dos Santos	Brazil	2:41:04		SB
28	Oisin Lane	Ireland	2:41:36		
29	Alexandros Papamichail	Greece	2:42:07		
30	Oscar Patín	Ecuador	2:43:48		
31	Vít Hlaváč	Czech Republic	2:44:08		
32	Mitchell Baker	Australia	2:51:11	> > > PZ	SB
33	Yassir Cabrera	Panama	2:51:37		
34	Cam Corbishley	Great Britain & N.I.	2:52:15	~ ~	
	Ivan Banzeruk	Ukraine	DNF		
	José Luis Doctor	Mexico	DNF	~	
	Matteo Giupponi	Italy	DNF	~	
	Ihor Hlavan	Ukraine	DNF	~	
	Kim Min-gyu	South Korea	DNF		
	Xavier Mena	Ecuador	DNF		
	Michal Morvay	Slovakia	DNF	> >	
	Andrés Olivas	Mexico	DNF	~ ~ ~ PZ	
	Julio César Salazar	Mexico	DNF		
	Wang Qin	China	DNF		
	Ram Baboo	India	DQ	~ ~ ~ ~	TR54.7.5
	Teodorico Caporaso	Italy	DQ	> ~ ~ ~	TR54.7.5
	César Herrera	Colombia	DQ	~ ~ ~ ~	TR54.7.5
	José Leonardo Montaña	Colombia	DQ	> ~ > ~ ~	TR54.7.5
	Yehor Shelest	Ukraine	DQ	> > > >	TR54.7.5
	Zhang Jinrui	China	DQ	~ ~ > >	TR54.7.5

Key:	~ Red card for loss of contact	> Red card for bent knee	PZ 3.5 min. Penalty Zone	TR54.7.5: Disqualified by Rule TR54.7.5 (4 red cards)
