= Mexico at the 2023 World Athletics Championships =

- WA code: MEX

in Budapest, Hungary 19 August 2023 – 27 August 2023
- Competitors: 25 (13 men and 12 women)
- Medals: Gold 0 Silver 0 Bronze 0 Total 0

World Athletics Championships appearances
- 1976; 1980; 1983; 1987; 1991; 1993; 1995; 1997; 1999; 2001; 2003; 2005; 2007; 2009; 2011; 2013; 2015; 2017; 2019; 2022; 2023; 2025

Mexico competed at the 2023 World Athletics Championships in Budapest, Hungary, from 19 to 27 August. 2023.

== Results ==
Key

- Q = Qualified for the next round
- q = Qualified for the next round as a fastest loser or, in field events, by position without achieving the qualifying target
- NR = National record
- PB = Personal best
- SB = Season best
- NM = No mark
- N/A = Round not applicable for the event

=== Men ===
==== Track and road events ====
Athlete	Event	Final	
Athlete	Event	Result	Rank
Patricio Castillo	Marathon	DNF	
José Luis Santana	Marathon	2:15:51	32
Noel Chama	20 kilometres walk	1:21:51	25
José Luis Doctor	20 kilometres walk	1:23:35	32
Andrés Eduardo Olivas	20 kilometres walk	1:19:55 SB	18
José Leyver Ojeda	35 kilometres walk	2:41:34	31
Ricardo Ortiz	35 kilometres walk	2:29:14 SB	11
Ever Palma	35 kilometres walk	2:39:40 SB	29

==== Field events ====
Athlete	Event	Qualification		Final	
Athlete	Event	Distance	Position	Distance	Position
Erik Portillo	High jump	2.18	28	Did not advance	
Edgar Rivera	High jump	2.25	14	Did not advance	
Uziel Muñoz	Shot put	20.62	15	Did not advance	
Diego del Real	Hammer throw	74.91	11 q	72.56	12

=== Women ===
==== Track and road events ====
Athlete	Event	Heat		Semifinal		Final	
Athlete	Event	Result	Rank	Result	Rank	Result	Rank
Cecilia Tamayo-Garza	200 metres	23.25	5	Did not advance			
Paola Morán	400 metres	51.59	2 Q	51.46	6	Did not advance	
Alma Delia Cortés	1500 metres	4:06:03 PB	8	Did not advance			
Laura Galván	5000 metres	14:43.94 NR	8 Q	—N/a		14:59.32	10
Citlali Cristian Moscote	Marathon	—N/a				2:36:03	34
Risper Gesabwa	Marathon	—N/a				2:38:29	44
Argentina Valdepeñas Cerna	Marathon	—N/a				2:43:35	56
Alegna González	20 kilometres walk	—N/a				1:27:36	5
Valeria Ortuño	20 kilometres walk	—N/a				1:40:53	40
Sofía Ramos Rodríguez	20 kilometres walk	—N/a				1:37:49	36
Ilse Guerrero	35 kilometres walk	—N/a				3:03:41 SB	30
Alejandra Ortega	35 kilometres walk	—N/a				2:50:44 NR	12
