= 2025 World Athletics Championships – Women's 35 kilometres walk =

Women's 35 kilometres walk at the 2025 World Athletics Championships
- Venue: National Stadium
- Location: Tokyo, Japan
- Dates: 13 September
- Competitors: 47 from 22 nations
- Winning time: 2:39:01

Medalists
gold medal	María Pérez	Spain
silver medal	Antonella Palmisano	Italy
bronze medal	Paula Milena Torres	Ecuador

The women's 35 kilometres walk at the 2025 World Athletics Championships was held at the National Stadium in Tokyo on 13 September 2025.

== Records ==
Before the competition records were as follows:

Record	Athlete & Nat.	Perf.	Location	Date
World Record	María Pérez (ESP)	2:37:15	Poděbrady, Czech Republic	21 May 2023
Championship Record	María Pérez (ESP)	2:38:40	Budapest, Hungary	24 August 2023
World Leading	María Pérez (ESP)	2:38:59	Poděbrady, Czech Republic	18 May 2025
African Record	Jessica Groenewald (RSA)	3:13:17	Dublin, Ireland	13 July 2025
Asian Record	Liu Hong (CHN)	2:38:42	Wajima, Japan	16 April 2023
European Record	María Pérez (ESP)	2:37:15	Poděbrady, Czech Republic	21 May 2023
North, Central American and Caribbean Record	Alegna González (MEX)	2:44:28	Dublin, Ireland	13 July 2025
Oceanian Record	Olivia Sandery (AUS)	2:42:40	Nomi, Japan	16 March 2025
South American Record	Kimberly García (PER)	2:37:44	Dudince, Slovakia	25 March 2023

== Qualification standard ==
The standard to qualify automatically for entry was 2:48:00.

== Schedule ==
The event schedule, in local time (UTC+9), was as follows:

Date	Time	Round
13 September	07:30	Final

== Results ==
The race was started on 13 September at 7:30.

Place	Athlete	Nation	Time	Warnings	Notes
1st place, gold medalist(s)	María Pérez	Spain	2:39:01	~	
2nd place, silver medalist(s)	Antonella Palmisano	Italy	2:42:24		
3rd place, bronze medalist(s)	Paula Milena Torres	Ecuador	2:42:44	~ ~	NR
4	Peng Li	China	2:43:29		PB
5	Katarzyna Zdziebło	Poland	2:44:37	~	SB
6	Raquel González	Spain	2:45:41		SB
7	Cristina Montesinos	Spain	2:46:44		
8	Hanna Shevchuk	Ukraine	2:49:44	~	
9	Rebecca Henderson	Australia	2:50:03	~	
10	Kimberly García	Peru	2:50:37		
11	Nicole Colombi	Italy	2:51:04		
12	Hana Burzalová	Slovakia	2:51:15		
13	Viviane Lyra	Brazil	2:51:16		
14	Olivia Sandery	Australia	2:51:43	~	
15	Yukiko Umeno	Japan	2:56:28		
16	Yin Hang	China	2:56:51	> >	
17	Eleonora Giorgi	Italy	2:58:50	~ ~ ~ PZ	
18	Olga Fiaska	Greece	2:59:59		SB
19	Allanah Pitcher	Australia	3:00:08		
20	Maika Yagi	Japan	3:00:08		
21	Masumi Fuchise	Japan	3:03:29		
22	Maria Michta-Coffey	United States	3:05:02		SB
23	Karla Jaramillo	Ecuador	3:05:03		
24	Priyanka Goswami	India	3:05:58	> > > PZ	
25	Agnieszka Ellward	Poland	3:08:21		
26	Mayara Vicentainer	Brazil	3:08:54		
27	Joana Pontes	Portugal	3:09:07		PB
28	Ma Li	China	3:09:32		
29	Ema Hačundová	Slovakia	3:10:21		
30	Miranda Melville	United States	3:12:07		
31	Brigitte Coaquira	Peru	3:13:22		
32	Katie Burnett	United States	3:14:13		
33	Kader Güvenç	Turkey	3:14:46	>	PB
34	Jessica Groenewald	South Africa	3:16:03		
35	Polina Repina	Kazakhstan	3:20:00	> >	
36	Elianay Pereira	Brazil	3:20:32		
37	Sofia Alikanioti	Greece	3:21:06		
38	Naomi Garcia	Puerto Rico	3:21:57	>	
	Mary Luz Andía	Peru	DNF		
	Viktória Madarász	Hungary	DNF		
	Antigoni Ntrismpioti	Greece	DNF		
	Johana Ordóñez	Ecuador	DNF		
	Valeria Ortuño	Mexico	DNF		
	Karla Serrano	Mexico	DNF		
	Galina Yakusheva	Kazakhstan	DNF		
	Olivia Lundman	Canada	DQ	> > > > ~	
	Alegna González	Mexico	DNS		

Key:	~ Red card for loss of contact	> Red card for bent knee	PZ 3.5 min. Penalty Zone	TR54.7.5: Disqualified by Rule TR54.7.5 (4 red cards)
