= Mexico at the 2022 World Athletics Championships =

- Flag of Mexico
- WA code: MEX
- National federation: Federation of Mexican Athletics Associations
- Website: www.fmaa.mx

in Eugene, United States 15 July 2022 – 24 July 2022
- Competitors: 25 (14 men and 11 women) in 16 events
- Medals: Gold 0 Silver 0 Bronze 0 Total 0

World Athletics Championships appearances
- 1976; 1980; 1983; 1987; 1991; 1993; 1995; 1997; 1999; 2001; 2003; 2005; 2007; 2009; 2011; 2013; 2015; 2017; 2019; 2022; 2023; 2025

Mexico competed at the 2022 World Athletics Championships in Eugene, United States, from 15 to 24 July 2022. The Federation of Mexican Athletics Associations entered 25 athletes.

For the second time in a row, Mexico ended its participation in the World Athletics Championships without winning a medal. Mexico was ranked 67th place in the overall placing table with two points, thanks to Alegna González's seventh place in the women's 20 kilometres race walk.

== Results ==
Mexico has entered 25 athletes.

Key

- Note: Ranks given for track events are within the athlete's heat only
- Q = Qualified for the next round
- q = Qualified for the next round as a fastest loser or, in field events, by position without achieving the qualifying target
- NR = National record
- PB = Personal best
- SB = Season best
- N/A = Round not applicable for the event

=== Men ===
Track and road events

Athlete	Event	Heat		Semi-final		Final	
Athlete	Event	Result	Rank	Result	Rank	Result	Rank
Luis Avilés	400 metres	46.47	6	Did not advance			
Jesús Tonatiú López	800 metres	1:44.67 SB	2 Q	1:46.17	5	Did not advance	
Patricio Castillo	Marathon	—N/a				2:11:51	29
Darío Castro	Marathon	—N/a				2:18:32	51
Jesús Calderón	20 kilometres walk	—N/a				1:35:43	42
Andrés Olivas	20 kilometres walk	—N/a				1:23:26	18
Julio César Salazar	20 kilometres walk	—N/a				1:25:16	25
José Luis Doctor	35 kilometres walk	—N/a				2:32:43	22
Ricardo Ortíz	35 kilometres walk	—N/a				2:27:11 NR	11
Ever Palma	35 kilometres walk	—N/a				2:27:55 PB	12

Field events

Athlete	Event	Qualification		Final	
Athlete	Event	Distance	Position	Distance	Position
Edgar Rivera	High jump	2.25	12 q	2.19	13
Uziel Muñoz	Shot put	20.24	12 q	20.01	12
Diego del Real	Hammer throw	74.12	16	Did not advance	
David Carreón	Javelin throw	77.61	20	Did not advance	

=== Women ===
Track and road events

Athlete	Event	Heat		Semi-final		Final	
Athlete	Event	Result	Rank	Result	Rank	Result	Rank
Paola Morán	400 metres	52.28	5	Did not advance			
Mariela Real	800 metres	2:03.24	8	Did not advance			
Alma Delia Cortés	1500 metres	4:13.92	13	Did not advance			
Laura Galván	1500 metres	4:07.25	11	Did not advance			
Laura Galván	5000 metres	15:15.92	11	—N/a		Did not advance	
Risper Gesabwa	Marathon	—N/a				2:30:47 SB	18
Citlali Moscote	Marathon	—N/a				2:26:33	10
Alegna González	20 kilometres walk	—N/a				1:29:40 SB	7
Valeria Ortuño	20 kilometres walk	—N/a				DNF	
Nadia González	35 kilometres walk	—N/a				2:52:06 NR	14
Aura Morales	35 kilometres walk	—N/a				3:04:50	28
Alejandra Ortega	35 kilometres walk	—N/a				2:58:46	21
