= Ecuador at the 2019 World Athletics Championships =

- WA code: ECU
- Website: featle.org.ec (in Spanish)

in Doha, Qatar
- Competitors: 12 (5 men and 7 women) in 8 events
- Medals Ranked 31st: Gold 0 Silver 0 Bronze 1 Total 1

World Athletics Championships appearances
- 1983; 1987; 1991; 1993; 1995; 1997; 1999; 2001; 2003; 2005; 2007; 2009; 2011; 2013; 2015; 2017; 2019; 2022; 2023; 2025

Ecuador competed at the 2019 World Championships in Athletics in Doha, Qatar from 27 September to 6 October 2019. The country finished in 31st place in the medal table.

== Medalists ==
Medal	Athlete	Event	Date
Bronze	Álex Quiñónez	Men's 200 metres	October 1

== Results ==
(q – qualified, NM – no mark, SB – season best)

=== Men ===
Track and road events

Athlete	Event	Heat		Semifinal		Final	
Athlete	Event	Result	Rank	Result	Rank	Result	Rank
Álex Quiñónez	200 m	20.08	2 Q	19.95	2 Q	19.98	3rd place, bronze medalist(s)
Brian Pintado	20 km walk	—N/a				1:33:48	23
Mauricio Arteaga	20 km walk	—N/a				did not finish	
Andrés Chocho	20 km walk	—N/a				1:32:49	18
Andrés Chocho	50 km walk	—N/a				did not finish	
Claudio Villanueva	50 km walk	—N/a				did not finish	

=== Women ===
Track and road events

Athlete	Event	Heat		Semifinal		Final	
Athlete	Event	Result	Rank	Result	Rank	Result	Rank
Ángela Tenorio	100 m	11.40	32	did not advance			
Rosa Chacha	Marathon	—N/a				did not finish	
Karla Jaramillo	20 km walk	—N/a				1:38:26	18
Glenda Morejón	20 km walk	—N/a				1:39:38	25
Magaly Bonilla	50 km walk	—N/a				4:37:03	7
Paola Pérez	50 km walk	—N/a				4:38:54	9

Field events

Athlete	Event	Qualification		Final	
Athlete	Event	Result	Rank	Result	Rank
Liuba Zaldívar	Triple jump	13.56	24	did not advance	
