= Ecuador at the 2023 World Athletics Championships =

- Flag of Ecuador
- WA code: ECU

in Budapest, Hungary 19 August 2023 – 27 August 2023
- Competitors: 17 (6 men and 11 women)
- Medals Ranked 27th: Gold 0 Silver 1 Bronze 0 Total 1

World Athletics Championships appearances
- 1983; 1987; 1991; 1993; 1995; 1997; 1999; 2001; 2003; 2005; 2007; 2009; 2011; 2013; 2015; 2017; 2019; 2022; 2023

Ecuador competed at the 2023 World Athletics Championships in Budapest, Hungary, from 19 to 27 August 2023.

== Medalists ==
Medal	Athlete	Event	Date
Silver	Brian Pintado	Men's 35 kilometres walk	August 24

== Results ==
Ecuador entered 17 athletes.

Key

- Q = Qualified for the next round
- q = Qualified for the next round as a fastest loser or, in field events, by position without achieving the qualifying target
- NR = National record
- PB = Personal best
- SB = Season best
- N/A = Round not applicable for the event

=== Men ===
Track and road events

Athlete	Event	Final	
Athlete	Event	Result	Rank
Segundo Jami	Marathon	2:16:49	36
David Hurtado	20 kilometres walk	1:20:07	19
Jordy Jiménez	20 kilometres walk	1:20:08 PB	20
Brian Pintado	20 kilometres walk	1:18:26 PB	7
Andrés Chocho	35 kilometres walk	DNF	
Brian Pintado	35 kilometres walk	2:24:34 AR	2nd place, silver medalist(s)

Field events

Athlete	Event	Qualification		Final	
Athlete	Event	Distance	Position	Distance	Position
Juan José Caicedo	Discus throw	55.78	35	Did not advance	

=== Women ===
Track and road events

Athlete	Event	Heat		Semifinal		Final	
Athlete	Event	Result	Rank	Result	Rank	Result	Rank
Ángela Tenorio	100 metres	11.52	6	Did not advance			
Nicole Caicedo	200 metres	23.51	7	Did not advance			
Nicole Caicedo	400 metres	52.82	7	Did not advance			
Andrea Bonilla	Marathon	—				DNF	
Rosa Chacha	Marathon	—				2:42:00	51
Silvia Ortiz	Marathon	—				2:35:09	29
Glenda Morejón	20 kilometres walk	—				1:27:40 SB	6
Johana Ordóñez	20 kilometres walk	—				1:33:58	25
Paula Milena Torres	20 kilometres walk	—				1:38:03	38
Magaly Bonilla	35 kilometres walk	—				2:47:09	9
Karla Jaramillo	35 kilometres walk	—				3:05:55	32
Johana Ordóñez	35 kilometres walk	—				2:54:58 SB	17

Field events

Athlete	Event	Qualification		Final	
Athlete	Event	Distance	Position	Distance	Position
Juleisy Angulo	Javelin throw	55.27	25	Did not advance	
