= 35 kilometres race walk =

Racewalking event in athletics

Athletics 35 kilometres race walk

World Championship records
- Men: Massimo Stano (ITA) 2:23:14 (2022)
- Women: María Pérez (ESP) 2:38:40 (2023)

The 35 kilometres race walk is a road racewalking event which became a standard championship discipline in 2022, with world records being recognised after 1 January 2023.

== Area records ==
- Updated 3 November 2026.

Area	Men			Women		
Area	Time	Season	Athlete	Time	Season	Athlete
World	2:20:43	2025	Massimo Stano (ITA)	2:37:15	2023	María Pérez (ESP)
Area records
Africa (records)	2:31:15	2022	Wayne Snyman (RSA)	3:13:17	2025	Jessica Groenewald (RSA)
Asia (records)	2:21:47	2024	Masatora Kawano (JPN)	2:38:42	2023	Liu Hong (CHN)
Europe (records)	2:20:43	2025	Massimo Stano (ITA)	2:37:15	2023	María Pérez (ESP)
North, Central America and Caribbean (records)	2:21:40	2025	Evan Dunfee (CAN)	2:44:28	2025	Alegna González (MEX)
Oceania (records)	2:25:21	2025	Rhydian Cowley (AUS)	2:42:40	2025	Olivia Sandery (AUS)
South America (records)	2:24:34	2023	Brian Pintado (ECU)	2:37:44	2023	Kimberly García (PER)

== All-time top 25 ==
=== Men ===
- Correct as of May 2025.

Ath.#	Perf.#	Time (s)	Athlete	Nation	Date	Place	Ref.
1	1	2:20:43	Massimo Stano	Italy	18 May 2025	Poděbrady	
2	2	2:21:31	Vladimir Kanaykin	Russia	19 February 2006	Sochi	
3	3	2:21:40	Evan Dunfee	Canada	22 March 2025	Dudince	
4	4	2:21:47	Masatora Kawano	Japan	27 October 2024	Takahata	
5	5	2:22:55	Xianghong He	China	4 March 2023	Huangshan	
6	6	2:23:13	Tomohiro Noda	Japan	16 April 2023	Wajima Race Walk Course, Wajima	
	7	2:23:14	Stano #2		24 July 2022	Autzen Complex, Eugene, OR	
	8	2:23:15	Kawano #2		24 July 2022	Eugene	
7	9	2:23:21	Christopher Linke	Germany	18 May 2025	Poděbrady	
8	10	2:23:44	Perseus Karlstrom	Sweden	24 July 2022	Eugene	
9	11	2:23:48	Miguel Ángel López	Spain	18 May 2025	Poděbrady	
10	12	2:24:19	Sergey Kozhevnikov	Russia	13 February 2023	Avtodrom, Sochi	
11	13	2:24:24	Satoshi Maruo	Japan	27 October 2024	Takahata	
12	14	2:24:25	Sergey Bakulin	Russia	1 March 2009	Adler, Sochi	
13	15	2:24:30	Álvaro Martín	Spain	24 August 2023	Nemzeti Atlétikai Központ, Budapest	
14	16	2:24:34	Brian Pintado	Ecuador	24 August 2023	Nemzeti Atlétikai Központ, Budapest	
	17	2:24:37	Pintado #2		24 July 2022	Autzen Complex, Eugene, OR	
15	18	2:24:38	Hayato Katsuki	Japan	16 March 2025	Nomi	
	19	2:24:40	Linke #2		22 March 2025	Dudince	
16	20	2:24:41	José Luis Doctor	Mexico	22 March 2025	Dudince	
	21	2:24:45	He #2		24 July 2022	Eugene	
	22	2:24:53	Bakulin #2		19 February 2018	Sochi	
17	23	2:24:56	Denis Nizhegorodov	Russia	1 March 2009	Adler, Sochi	
	24	2:25:02	Dunfee #2		24 July 2022	Eugene	
18	25	2:25:08	Andres Olivas	Mexico	16 March 2025	Nomi	
19		2:25:14	Caio Bonfim	Brazil	24 July 2022	Autzen Complex, Eugene, OR	
20		2:25:19	Andrey Ruzavin	Russia	1 March 2009	Adler, Sochi	
21		2:25:21	Éider Arévalo	Colombia	24 July 2022	Eugene	
21		2:25:21	Rhydian Cowley	Australia	16 March 2025	Nomi	
23		2:25:39	Julio César Salazar	Mexico	22 March 2025	Dudince	
24		2:25:45	Kazuki Takahashi	Japan	16 March 2025	Nomi	
25		2:25:50	Subaru Ishida	Japan	16 March 2025	Nomi	

=== Women ===
- Correct as of September 2025.

Ath.#	Perf.#	Time (s)	Athlete	Nation	Date	Place	Ref.
1	1	2:37:11	Klavdiya Afanasyeva	Russia	20 May 2023	Saransk	
2	2	2:37:15	María Perez	Spain	21 May 2023	Poděbrady	
3	3	2:37:44	Kimberly García	Peru	25 March 2023	Dudince	
4	4	2:37:46	Margarita Nikiforova	Russia	27 August 2022	Yelena Yelesina Stadium, Chelyabinsk	
	5	2:38:24	Afanasyeva #2		18 February 2019	Sochi	
	6	2:38:40	Perez #2		24 August 2023	Nemzeti Atlétikai Központ, Budapest	
5	7	2:38:42	Hong Liu	China	16 April 2023	Wajima Race Walk Course, Wajima	
	8	2:38:49	Nikiforova #2		21 May 2022	Cheboksary	
	9	2:38:59	Perez #3		18 May 2025	Poděbrady	
	10	2:39:16	Perez #4		30 January 2022	Lepe	
	10	2:39:16	Garcia Leon #2		22 July 2022	Autzen Complex, Eugene, OR	
6	12	2:39:35	Antonella Palmisano	Italy	18 May 2025	Poděbrady	
7	13	2:39:51	Darya Golubchekova	Authorised Neutral Athletes	5 September 2021	Voronovo	
8	14	2:40:03	Katarzyna Zdziebło	Poland	22 July 2022	Autzen Complex, Eugene, OR	
	15	2:40:06	Liu #2		25 March 2023	Dudince	
	16	2:40:27	Afanasyeva #3		13 February 2023	Avtodrom, Sochi	
9	17	2:40:37	Shijie Qieyang	China	22 July 2022	Autzen Complex, Eugene, OR	
	18	2:40:52	Garcia Leon #3		24 August 2023	Nemzeti Atlétikai Központ, Budapest	
10	19	2:40:59	Xueying Bai	China	4 March 2023	Huangshan	
11	20	2:41:00	Li Ma	China	24 September 2022	Xi'an	
	21	2:41:28	Nikiforova #3		31 January 2022	Sochi	
	22	2:41:38	Perez #5		26 February 2023	Cieza	
12	23	2:41:47	Nicole Colombi	Italy	18 May 2025	Poděbrady	
13	24	2:41:54	Eleonora Giorgi	Italy	22 February 2025	Aksu	
14	25	2:41:58	Antigoni Ntrismpioti	Greece	22 July 2022	Autzen Complex, Eugene, OR	
15		2:42:27	Raquel González	Spain	22 July 2022	Autzen Complex, Eugene, OR	
16		2:42:39	Maocuo Li	China	4 March 2023	Huangshan	
17		2:42:40	Olivia Sandery	Australia	16 March 2025	Nomi	
18		2:42:41	Hanna Shevchuk	Ukraine	18 May 2025	Poděbrady	
19		2:42:44	Paula Milena Torres	Ecuador	13 September 2025	Tokyo	
20		2:42:45	Laura Garcia-Caro	Spain	22 July 2022	Autzen Complex, Eugene, OR	
21		2:42:52	Lamei Yin	China	4 March 2023	Huangshan	
22		2:43:25	Quanming Wu	China	22 January 2022	Nanjing	
23		2:43:59	Yelena Lashmanova	Russia	31 January 2022	Sochi	
24		2:44:11	Kumiko Okada	Japan	16 April 2023	Wajima Race Walk Course, Wajima	
25		2:44:17	Sandra Arenas	Colombia	16 March 2025	Nomi	

==== Notes ====
Below is a list of other times equal or superior to 2:44:17:

- María Pérez also walked 2:44:17 (2021).
- Margarita Nikiforova also walked 2:43:14 (2021), 2:44:00 (2019).
- Kimberly García also walked 2:43:19 (2022).
- Qieyang Shijie also walked 2:43:06 (2022).
- Antigoni Ntrismpioti also walked 2:43.22 (2023).

== World Championships medalists ==
=== Men ===
Championships	Gold	Silver	Bronze
2022 Eugene	Massimo Stano (ITA)	Masatora Kawano (JPN)	Perseus Karlström (SWE)
2023 Budapest	Álvaro Martín (ESP)	Brian Pintado (ECU)	Masatora Kawano (JPN)
2025 Tokyo	Evan Dunfee (CAN)	Caio Bonfim (BRA)	Hayato Katsuki (JPN)

=== Women ===
Championships	Gold	Silver	Bronze
2022 Eugene	Kimberly García (PER)	Katarzyna Zdziebło (POL)	Qieyang Shijie (CHN)
2023 Budapest	María Pérez (ESP)	Kimberly García (PER)	Antigoni Ntrismpioti (GRE)
2025 Tokyo	María Pérez (ESP)	Antonella Palmisano (ITA)	Paula Milena Torres (ECU)
