= Ecuador at the 2022 World Athletics Championships =

- WA code: ECU

in Eugene, United States 15 July 2022 – 24 July 2022
- Competitors: 15 (6 men and 9 women) in 8 events
- Medals: Gold 0 Silver 0 Bronze 0 Total 0

World Athletics Championships appearances
- 1983; 1987; 1991; 1993; 1995; 1997; 1999; 2001; 2003; 2005; 2007; 2009; 2011; 2013; 2015; 2017; 2019; 2022; 2023; 2025

Ecuador competed at the 2022 World Athletics Championships in Eugene, United States, from 15 to 24 July 2022.

== Results ==
Ecuador entered 20 athletes.

Key

- Q = Qualified for the next round
- q = Qualified for the next round as a fastest loser or, in field events, by position without achieving the qualifying target
- NR = National record
- PB = Personal best
- SB = Season best
- N/A = Round not applicable for the event

=== Men ===
Track and road events

Athlete	Event	Final	
Athlete	Event	Result	Rank
Brian Pintado	20 km walk	1:19:34 PB	5
David Hurtado	20 km walk	1:21:11	11
Jordy Jiménez	20 km walk	1:24:35	23
Brian Pintado	35 km walk	2:24:37 AR	4
Andrés Chocho	35 km walk	2:33:28	24
Jhonatan Amores	35 km walk	Did not finish	

Combined events – Decathlon

Athlete	Event	100 m	LJ	SP	HJ	400 m	110H	DT	PV	JT	1500 m	Final	Rank
Andy Preciado	Result	DNF	Did not start									Did not finish	
Andy Preciado	Points	0	Did not start									Did not finish	

=== Women ===
Track and road events

Athlete	Event	Heat		Semi-final		Final	
Athlete	Event	Result	Rank	Result	Rank	Result	Rank
Anahí Suárez	200 m	22.56	12 Q	22.74 NR	16	Did not advance	
Yuliana Angulo; Anahí Suárez; Nicole Caicedo; Nicole Jazmine Chala	4 × 100 m relay	44.17 SB	15	—		Did not advance	
Glenda Morejón	20 km walk	—				1:34:27	19
Karla Jaramillo	20 km walk	—				1:36:36	26
Magaly Bonilla	35 km walk	—				2:50:39	12
Paola Pérez	35 km walk	—				2:54:15	16

Field events

Athlete	Event	Qualification		Final	
Athlete	Event	Distance	Position	Distance	Position
Juleisy Angulo	Javelin throw	57.28	17	Did not advance	
