= 2023 World Athletics Championships – Men's 35 kilometres walk =

Men's 35 kilometres walk at the 2023 World Championships
- Venue: National Athletics Centre
- Dates: 24 August
- Competitors: 49 from 26 nations
- Winning time: 2:24:30

Medalists
| gold medal | Álvaro Martín | Spain |
| silver medal | Brian Pintado | Ecuador |
| bronze medal | Masatora Kawano | Japan |

The men's 35 kilometres walk at the 2023 World Athletics Championships was held at the National Athletics Centre in Budapest on 24 August 2023.

== Records ==
Before the competition records were as follows:

| Record | Athlete & Nat. | Perf. | Location | Date |
|---|---|---|---|---|
| World record | Target performance | 2:22:00 | | |
| Championship record | Massimo Stano (ITA) | 2:23:14 | Eugene, United States | 24 July 2022 |
| World Leading | He Xianghong (CHN) | 2:22:55 | Huangshan, China | 4 March 2023 |
| African Record | Wayne Snyman (RSA) | 2:32:52 | Cape Town, South Africa | 15 January 2022 |
| Asian Record | He Xianghong (CHN) | 2:22:55 | Huangshan, China | 4 March 2023 |
| North, Central American and Caribbean record | Evan Dunfee (CAN) | 2:25:02 | Eugene, United States | 24 July 2022 |
| South American Record | Brian Pintado (ECU) | 2:24:37 | Eugene, United States | 24 July 2022 |
| European Record | Massimo Stano (ITA) | 2:23:14 | Eugene, United States | 24 July 2022 |
| Oceanian record | Rhydian Cowley (AUS) | 2:27:33 | Melbourne, Australia | 21 May 2023 |

== Qualification standard ==
The standard to qualify automatically for entry was 2:29:40.

== Schedule ==
The event schedule, in local time (CEST), was as follows:

| Date | Time | Round |
|---|---|---|
| 24 August | 7:00 | Final |

== Results ==
The race was started on 24 August at 7:00.

| Rank | Name | Nationality | Time | Warnings | Notes |
|---|---|---|---|---|---|
| 1st place, gold medalist(s) | Álvaro Martín | Spain | 2:24:30 | | NR |
| 2nd place, silver medalist(s) | Brian Pintado | Ecuador | 2:24:34 | ~~ | AR |
| 3rd place, bronze medalist(s) | Masatora Kawano | Japan | 2:25:12 | ~ | SB |
| 4 | Evan Dunfee | Canada | 2:25:28 | > | SB |
| 5 | Christopher Linke | Germany | 2:25:35 | | NR |
| 6 | Tomohiro Noda | Japan | 2:25:50 | | |
| 7 | Massimo Stano | Italy | 2:25:59 | | SB |
| 8 | Perseus Karlström | Sweden | 2:27:03 | > | SB |
| 9 | Karl Junghannß | Germany | 2:27:08 | | PB |
| 10 | Caio Bonfim | Brazil | 2:27:45 | ~~ | |
| 11 | Ricardo Ortiz | Mexico | 2:29:14 | ~ | SB |
| 12 | Miguel Ángel López | Spain | 2:29:32 | | |
| 13 | Satoshi Maruo | Japan | 2:29:52 | ~~ | |
| 14 | Kévin Campion | France | 2:30:18 | | SB |
| 15 | Andrea Agrusti | Italy | 2:30:32 | >> | |
| 16 | Riccardo Orsoni | Italy | 2:31:41 | > | |
| 17 | José Leonardo Montaña | Colombia | 2:31:45 | >~ | SB |
| 18 | Veli-Matti Partanen | Finland | 2:32:28 | ~>~ | |
| 19 | Dominik Černý | Slovakia | 2:32:56 | >> | PB |
| 20 | Matteo Giupponi | Italy | 2:34:58 | | SB |
| 21 | Wayne Snyman | South Africa | 2:35:13 | | SB |
| 22 | Marc Tur | Spain | 2:36:04 | >> | |
| 23 | He Xianghong | China | 2:37:31 | | |
| 24 | Brendan Boyce | Ireland | 2:37:26 | >> | SB |
| 25 | Aleksi Ojala | Finland | 2:38:34 | ~ | |
| 26 | Jakub Jelonek | Poland | 2:38:45 | >>~ | |
| 27 | Ram Baboo | India | 2:39:07 | ~~~ | |
| 28 | Wang Qin | China | 2:39:19 | ~ | |
| 29 | Ever Jair Palma Olivares | Mexico | 2:39:40 | ~ | SB |
| 30 | Bence Venyercsán | Hungary | 2:40:34 | > | |
| 31 | José Leyver | Mexico | 2:41:34 | ~~~ | |
| 32 | Arnis Rumbenieks | Latvia | 2:43:36 | > | |
| 33 | Ihor Hlavan | Ukraine | 2:45:18 | > | |
| | Éider Arévalo | Colombia | DNF | | |
| | Ivan Banzeruk | Ukraine | DNF | | |
| | Andrés Chocho | Ecuador | DNF | | |
| | Rhydian Cowley | Australia | DNF | > | |
| | Carl Dohmann | Germany | DNF | | |
| | Narcis Mihăilă | Romania | DNF | | |
| | Alexandros Papamichail | Greece | DNF | ~> | |
| | Dawid Tomala | Poland | DNF | | |
| | João Vieira | Portugal | DNF | | |
| | Artur Brzozowski | Poland | DQ | >~>> | TR54.7.5 |
| | Michal Morvay | Slovakia | DQ | >>>> | TR54.7.5 |
| | Aurélien Quinion | France | DQ | ~~~~ | TR54.7.5 |
| | Juan José Soto | Colombia | DQ | >~>> | TR54.7.5 |
| | Zhaxi Yangben | China | DQ | ~>~> | TR54.7.5 |
| | Luis Henry Campos | Peru | DNS | | |
| | César Rodríguez | Peru | DNS | | |

| Key: | ~ Red card for loss of contact | > Red card for bent knee | TR54.7.5: Disqualified by Rule TR54.7.5 (4 red cards) |
