= Ecuador at the 2017 World Championships in Athletics =

- Flag of Ecuador
- WA code: ECU
- National federation: Ecuadorian Athletics Federation
- Website: featle.org.ec (in Spanish)

in London, United Kingdom 4–13 August 2017
- Competitors: 18 (6 men and 12 women) in 8 events
- Medals: Gold 0 Silver 0 Bronze 0 Total 0

World Championships in Athletics appearances
- 1983; 1987; 1991; 1993; 1995; 1997; 1999; 2001; 2003; 2005; 2007; 2009; 2011; 2013; 2015; 2017; 2019; 2022; 2023; 2025

Ecuador competed at the 2017 World Championships in Athletics in London, Great Britain, from 4–13 August 2017.

== Results ==
=== Men ===
Track and road events

Athlete	Event	Final	
Athlete	Event	Result	Rank
Bayron Piedra	10,000 metres	28:50.72 SB	21
Segundo Jami	Marathon	2:24:28	57
Mauricio Arteaga	20 kilometres walk	1:22:28 SB	28
Brian Pintado	20 kilometres walk	1:21:17 PB	18
Andrés Chocho	50 kilometres walk	DQ	–
Claudio Villanueva	50 kilometres walk	3:49:27 PB	18

=== Women ===
Track and road events

Athlete	Event	Heat		Semifinal		Final	
Athlete	Event	Result	Rank	Result	Rank	Result	Rank
Narcisa Landazuri	100 metres	11.59	34	Did not advance			
Ángela Tenorio	100 metres	11.33	25	Did not advance			
Angela Brito	Marathon	—N/a				2:58:21	72
Rosa Chacha	Marathon	—N/a				2:37:50	32
Carmen Toaquiza	Marathon	—N/a				2:48:45	61
Yuliana Angulo; Narcisa Landazuri; Romina Cifuentes; Ángela Tenorio	4 × 100 metres relay	43.94 SB	12	—N/a		Did not advance	
Maritza Guamán	20 kilometres walk	—N/a				1:33:06	28
Johana Ordóñez	20 kilometres walk	—N/a				1:36:27	41
Paola Pérez	20 kilometres walk	—N/a				1:30:09	13
