= 2022 World Athletics Championships – Women's 20 kilometres walk =

Women's 20 kilometres walk at the 2022 World Championships
- Venue: Hayward Field
- Dates: 15 July
- Competitors: 41 from 26 nations
- Winning time: 1:26:59

Medalists
gold medal	Kimberly García	Peru
silver medal	Katarzyna Zdziebło	Poland
bronze medal	Qieyang Shijie	China

Video on YouTube Official Video

The women's 20 kilometres race walk at the 2022 World Athletics Championships was held on a 1 kilometer loop course on Martin Luther King Jr. Blvd. adjacent to Autzen Stadium in Eugene on 15 July 2022. 41 athletes from 26 nations entered to the event.

== Records ==
Before the competition records were as follows:

Record	Athlete & Nat.	Perf.	Location	Date
World record	Yang Jiayu (CHN)	1:23:49	Huangshan, China	20 March 2021
Championship record	Olimpiada Ivanova (RUS)	1:25:41	Helsinki, Finland	7 August 2005
World Leading	Elvira Chepareva (RUS)	1:26:42	Sochi, Russia	31 January 2022
African Record	Grace Wanjiru Njue (KEN)	1:30:40	Nairobi, Kenya	6 June 2018
Asian Record	Yang Jiayu (CHN)	1:23:49	Huangshan, China	20 March 2021
North, Central American and Caribbean record	Lupita González (MEX)	1:26:17	Rome, Italy	7 May 2016
South American Record	Glenda Morejón (ECU)	1:25:29	La Coruña, Spain	8 June 2019
European Record	Vera Sokolova (RUS)	1:25:08	Sochi, Russia	26 February 2011
Oceanian record	Jemima Montag (AUS)	1:27:27	Adelaide, Australia	13 February 2022

== Qualification standard ==
The standard to qualify automatically for entry was 1:31:00.

== Schedule ==
The event schedule, in local time (UTC−7), was as follows:

Date	Time	Round
15 July	13:10	Final

== Results ==
The race was started at 13:09. The results were as follows:

Rank	Name	Nationality	Time	Notes
1st place, gold medalist(s)	Kimberly García	Peru	1:26:58	NR
2nd place, silver medalist(s)	Katarzyna Zdziebło	Poland	1:27:31	NR
3rd place, bronze medalist(s)	Qieyang Shijie	China	1:27:56	
4	Jemima Montag	Australia	1:28:17	~
5	Liu Hong	China	1:29:00	SB ~
6	Nanako Fujii	Japan	1:29:01	SB
7	Alegna González	Mexico	1:29:40	SB
8	Valentina Trapletti	Italy	1:29:54	~
9	Ana Cabecinha	Portugal	1:30:29	SB >
10	Ma Zhenxia	China	1:30:39	~
11	Olena Sobchuk	Ukraine	1:31:19	
12	Lyudmyla Olyanovska	Ukraine	1:31:42	SB
13	Wu Quanming	China	1:31:44	~
14	Kumiko Okada	Japan	1:31:53	
15	Saskia Feige	Germany	1:32:12	~~
16	Noelia Vargas	Costa Rica	1:32:36	SB >
17	Viviane Lyra	Brazil	1:33:11	~~
18	Meryem Bekmez	Turkey	1:33:27	SB >
19	Glenda Morejón	Ecuador	1:34:27	
20	Rebecca Henderson	Australia	1:34:38	
21	Eliška Martínková	Czech Republic	1:34:45	~
22	Kiriaki Filtisakou	Greece	1:34:55	SB
23	Brigita Virbalytė-Dimšienė	Lithuania	1:35:36	SB
24	Robyn Stevens	United States	1:36:16	~
25	Carolina Costa	Portugal	1:36:31	
26	Karla Jaramillo	Ecuador	1:36:36	
27	Ángela Castro	Bolivia	1:36:52	SB
28	Christina Papadopoulou	Greece	1:37:20	SB >>>
29	Enni Nurmi	Finland	1:37:29	
30	Emily Wamusyi Ngii	Kenya	1:37:43	~
31	Evelyn Inga	Peru	1:38:23	SB >>
32	Inês Henriques	Portugal	1:38:32	
33	Galina Yakusheva	Kazakhstan	1:38:47	
34	Priyanka Goswami	India	1:39:42	~~~
35	Miranda Melville	United States	1:39:58	>>
36	Rachelle de Orbeta	Puerto Rico	1:41:55	~
	Valeria Ortuño	Mexico	DNF	
	Hanna Shevchuk	Ukraine	DNF	
	Nicole Colombi	Italy	DSQ TR54.7.5	>>>>
	Maidy Monge	Guatemala	DSQ TR54.7.5	~~~~
	María Pérez	Spain	DSQ TR54.7.5	~~~>

Key:	~ Red card for loss of contact	> Red card for bent knee	TR54.7.5: Disqualified by Rule TR54.7.5 (4 red cards)
