= 2023 World Athletics Championships – Men's 20 kilometres walk =

Men's 20 kilometres walk at the 2023 World Championships
- Venue: National Athletics Centre
- Dates: 19 August
- Competitors: 50 from 28 nations
- Winning time: 1:17:32

Medalists
gold medal	Álvaro Martín	Spain
silver medal	Perseus Karlström	Sweden
bronze medal	Caio Bonfim	Brazil

The men's 20 kilometres walk at the 2023 World Athletics Championships was held at the National Athletics Centre in Budapest on 19 August 2023.

== Summary ==
The skies over Budapest unloaded on the first event at these Championships drenching the 1 kilometer course just before race time. With tight turns, several athletes slipped and fell trying to compete at high speed.

From the gun, returning silver medalist Koki Ikeda went to the front, creating a gap over a pack led by Salih Korkmaz and two-time defending champion Toshikazu Yamanishi. On the fifth lap, Ikeda dropped a 3:49 to open up an 8-second lead. By the halfway point he had expanded that gap to 15 seconds. From that commanding lead, Ikeda began to show signs of weakness. Lap times in the low 3:50's became high 3:50's while the chase group was picking up speed. On the 15th lap, Álvaro Martín put the hammer down, dropping a 3:43 lap and pulling next to Ikeda. Martín followed that with a 3:48 crushing Ikeda's enthusiasm. Caio Bonfim, Perseus Karlström and Evan Dunfee were the next to pass Ikeda and set off in chase of Martín. Over the next three laps, Martín opened up 13 seconds over his chasers. He was able to celebrate on the final lap while Karlström was doing a 3:48 behind him to separate from Bonfim and capture silver.

== Records ==
Before the competition records were as follows:

Record	Athlete & Nat.	Perf.	Location	Date
World record	Yusuke Suzuki (JPN)	1:16:36	Nomi, Japan	15 March 2015
Championship record	Jefferson Pérez (ECU)	1:17:21	Saint-Denis, France	23 August 2003
World Leading	Zhang Jun (CHN)	1:17:47	Taicang, China	8 April 2023
African Record	Samuel Gathimba (KEN)	1:18:23	Nairobi, Kenya	18 June 2021
Asian Record	Yusuke Suzuki (JPN)	1:16:36	Nomi, Japan	15 March 2015
North, Central American and Caribbean record	Julio Martínez (GUA)	1:17:46	Eisenhüttenstadt, Germany	8 May 1999
South American Record	Jefferson Pérez (ECU)	1:17:21	Saint-Denis, France	23 August 2003
European Record	Yohann Diniz (FRA)	1:17:02	Arles, France	8 March 2015
Oceanian record	Nathan Deakes (AUS)	1:17:33	Cixi, China	23 April 2005

The following records were set at the competition:

Record	Perf.	Athlete	Nat.	Date
World Leading	1:17:32	Álvaro Martín	Spain	19 Aug 2023

== Qualification standard ==
The standard to qualify automatically for entry was 1:20:100.

== Schedule ==
The event schedule, in local time (CEST), was as follows:

Date	Time	Round
19 August	8:50	Final

== Results ==
The race was started on 19 August at 10:50.

Rank	Name	Nationality	Time	Notes
1st place, gold medalist(s)	Álvaro Martín	Spain	1:17:32	WL
2nd place, silver medalist(s)	Perseus Karlström	Sweden	1:17:39	NR
3rd place, bronze medalist(s)	Caio Bonfim	Brazil	1:17:47	NR
4	Evan Dunfee	Canada	1:18:03	NR
5	Christopher Linke	Germany	1:18:12	NR
6	Veli-Matti Partanen	Finland	1:18:22	NR
7	Brian Pintado	Ecuador	1:18:26	PB
8	Declan Tingay	Australia	1:18:30	PB
9	Samuel Gathimba	Kenya	1:18:34	SB
10	Gabriel Bordier	France	1:18:59	PB
11	Francesco Fortunato	Italy	1:19:01	
12	Yuta Koga	Japan	1:19:02	SB
13	Alberto Amezcua	Spain	1:19:28	PB
14	Rhydian Cowley	Australia	1:19:31	
15	Koki Ikeda	Japan	1:19:44	
16	Salih Korkmaz	Turkey	1:19:49	SB
17	César Rodríguez	Peru	1:19:52	NR
18	Andrés Olivas	Mexico	1:19:55	SB
19	David Hurtado	Ecuador	1:20:07	
20	Jordy Jiménez	Ecuador	1:20:08	PB
21	Eiki Takahashi	Japan	1:20:25	
22	Luis Henry Campos	Peru	1:20:56	PB
23	Máté Helebrandt	Hungary	1:21:16	PB
24	Toshikazu Yamanishi	Japan	1:21:39	
25	Noel Chama	Mexico	1:21:51	
26	Éider Arévalo	Colombia	1:21:55	
27	Vikash Singh	India	1:21:58	
28	Serhii Svitlychnyi	Ukraine	1:22:28	SB
29	Zhang Jun	China	1:23:13	
30	Andrea Cosi	Italy	1:23:28	
31	José Alejandro Barrondo	Guatemala	1:23:33	
32	José Luis Doctor	Mexico	1:23:35	
33	João Vieira	Portugal	1:23:37	
34	Dominik Černý	Slovakia	1:23:42	PB
35	Paramjeet Singh Bisht	India	1:24:02	
36	Max Batista Gonçalves dos Santos	Brazil	1:24:10	PB
37	Wang Zhaozhao	China	1:24:23	
38	Alexandros Papamichail	Greece	1:24:26	SB
39	Diego García	Spain	1:25:12	
40	Kyle Swan	Australia	1:26:02	
41	Nick Christie	United States	1:26:21	SB
42	José Eduardo Ortiz	Guatemala	1:26:29	
43	Jerry Jokinen	Finland	1:26:54	
44	Niu Wenchao	China	1:27:26	
45	Juan Manuel Cano	Argentina	1:27:29	
46	César Herrera	Colombia	1:27:47	
47	Akashdeep Singh	India	1:31:12	
	David Kenny	Ireland	DNF	
	Massimo Stano	Italy	DNF	
	Marius Žiūkas	Lithuania	DQ	
