= 2023 World Athletics Championships – Women's 20 kilometres walk =

Women's 20 kilometres walk at the 2023 World Championships
- Venue: National Athletics Centre
- Dates: 20 August
- Competitors: 48 from 23 nations
- Winning time: 1:26:51

Medalists
gold medal	María Pérez	Spain
silver medal	Jemima Montag	Australia
bronze medal	Antonella Palmisano	Italy

The women's 20 kilometres race walk at the 2023 World Athletics Championships was held on National Athletics Centre in Budapest on 20 August 2023. 48 athletes from 23 nations entered to the event.

== Summary ==
The cream rose to the top quickly as a group of about a dozen separated, led by world record holder Jiayu Yang. Defending champion Kimberly García took the point after the first lap and held the lead of the tight group through the halfway point as the lead pack whittled down to seven. After falling early in the race, Antonella Palmisano edged ahead to carry the lead to 15k. While most of the 1 kilometer laps had been in the 4:20's, on the 16th lap María Pérez dropped a monster 4:06 lap. Only Jemima Montag was able to produce any answer with a 4:10, which separated her from the rest of the pack but still 4 seconds down to Perez, who continued with a 4:09, 4:05 and 4:06 to leave no doubt about winning, ultimately 25 seconds ahead of Montag. Palmisano was able to get a slight edge on Alegna González and Glenda Morejón then had to hold off a 4:08 final lap by García León to take bronze.

== Records ==
Before the competition records were as follows:

Record	Athlete & Nat.	Perf.	Location	Date
World record	Yang Jiayu (CHN)	1:23:49	Huangshan, China	20 March 2021
Championship record	Olimpiada Ivanova (RUS)	1:25:41	Helsinki, Finland	7 August 2005
World Leading	María Pérez (ESP)	1:25:30	Córdoba, Spain	26 March 2023
African Record	Grace Wanjiru Njue (KEN)	1:30:40	Nairobi, Kenya	6 June 2018
Asian Record	Yang Jiayu (CHN)	1:23:49	Huangshan, China	20 March 2021
North, Central American and Caribbean record	Lupita González (MEX)	1:26:17	Rome, Italy	7 May 2016
South American Record	Glenda Morejón (ECU)	1:25:29	La Coruña, Spain	8 June 2019
European Record	Vera Sokolova (RUS)	1:25:08	Sochi, Russia	26 February 2011
Oceanian record	Jemima Montag (AUS)	1:27:27	Adelaide, Australia	13 February 2022

The following records were set at the competition:

Record	Perf.	Athlete	Nat.	Date
Oceanian record	1:27:16	Jemima Montag	AUS	20 Aug 2023

== Qualification standard ==
The standard to qualify automatically for entry was 1:29:20.

== Schedule ==
The event schedule, in local time (UTC+2), was as follows:

Date	Time	Round
20 August	07:15	Final

== Results ==
The race was started at 07:15. The results were as follows:

Rank	Name	Nationality	Time	Warnings	Notes
1st place, gold medalist(s)	María Pérez	Spain	1:26:51		
2nd place, silver medalist(s)	Jemima Montag	Australia	1:27:16	~	AR
3rd place, bronze medalist(s)	Antonella Palmisano	Italy	1:27:26		SB
4	Kimberly García	Peru	1:27:32		
5	Alegna González	Mexico	1:27:36	~	
6	Glenda Morejón	Ecuador	1:27:40	~~	SB
7	Ma Zhenxia	China	1:28:30	~	
8	Viviane Lyra	Brazil	1:28:36	~	PB
9	Ana Cabecinha	Portugal	1:28:49	>~	SB
10	Olena Sobchuk	Ukraine	1:28:50	~	PB
11	Lyudmyla Olyanovska	Ukraine	1:29:36	~	SB
12	Yang Jiayu	China	1:29:40		
13	Érica de Sena	Brazil	1:29:53	>	
14	Nanako Fujii	Japan	1:30:10		
15	Antigoni Drisbioti	Greece	1:30:19		
16	Clémence Beretta	France	1:30:43	~	
17	Liu Hong	China	1:30:43		
18	Pauline Stey	France	1:31:20		
19	Hanna Shevchuk	Ukraine	1:31:44	>	SB
20	Eleonora Giorgi	Italy	1:31:45	~~~	
21	Camille Moutard	France	1:32:18	~	
22	Valentina Trapletti	Italy	1:32:57		
23	Vitória Oliveira	Portugal	1:33:04	>	PB
24	Rachelle de Orbeta	Puerto Rico	1:33:19	~	
25	Johana Ordóñez	Ecuador	1:33:58		
26	Gabriela de Sousa	Brazil	1:33:59		
27	Eliška Martínková	Czech Republic	1:34:02	~~	
28	Antia Chamosa	Spain	1:34:20	~~	
29	Saskia Feige	Germany	1:34:49		
30	Ayane Yanai	Japan	1:34:59		
31	Mary Luz Andía	Peru	1:35:38	~~	SB
32	Rebecca Henderson	Australia	1:35:51	~	
33	Barbara Oláh	Hungary	1:35:55		
34	Viktória Madarász	Hungary	1:36:13		
35	Yukiko Umeno	Japan	1:36:52		
36	Sofía Ramos Rodríguez	Mexico	1:37:49	~	
37	Kiriaki Filtisakou	Greece	1:37:51		
38	Paula Milena Torres	Ecuador	1:38:03		
39	Ángela Castro	Bolivia	1:40:01		
40	Valeria Ortuño	Mexico	1:40:53		
	Sandra Arenas	Colombia	DNF	~~~	
	Meryem Bekmez	Turkey	DNF		
	Emily Wamusyi Ngii	Kenya	DNF	>>	
	Maritza Poncio	Guatemala	DNF		
	Evelyn Inga	Peru	DSQ	~~~~	TR54.7.5
	Olivia Sandery	Australia	DSQ	>>>>	TR54.7.5
	Katarzyna Zdziebło	Poland	DSQ	~>~~	TR54.7.5
	Christina Papadopoulou	Greece	DNS		

Key:	~ Red card for loss of contact	> Red card for bent knee	TR54.7.5: Disqualified by Rule TR54.7.5 (4 red cards)
