= Athletics at the 2026 Asian Games – Women's half marathon race walk =

Women's half marathon race walk at the 2026 Asian Games
- Venue: Aichi-Nagoya Race Walking Course, Aichi Prefecture
- Date: 23 September 2026
- Competitors: 8 from 5 nations
- Winning time: 1:33:40

Medalists
gold medal	Yang Liujing	China
silver medal	Kristina Morozova	Kazakhstan
bronze medal	Jiang Yunyan	China

The women's half marathon race walk competition at the 2026 Asian Games took place on 23 September 2026 at the Aichi-Nagoya Race Walking Course in Aichi Prefecture, Japan.

It was the first time the half marathon race walk was contested at the Asian Games, having replaced the 20 km race walk on the programme. China's Yang Liujing won the gold medal in 1:33:40, Kazakhstan's Kristina Morozova took silver, and China's Jiang Yunyan claimed bronze.

== Schedule ==
All times are Japan Standard Time (UTC+09:00)

Schedule
Date	Time	Event
23 September	07:30	Final

== Results ==
Key:	~ Red card for loss of contact	> Red card for bent knee

Place	Athlete	Nation	Time	Red cards	Notes
1st place, gold medalist(s)	Yang Liujing	China	1:33:40		
2nd place, silver medalist(s)	Kristina Morozova	Kazakhstan	1:35:25	>>	
3rd place, bronze medalist(s)	Jiang Yunyan	China	1:35:26	~~~	
4	Ayane Yanai	Japan	1:39:24		
5	Lee Se-ha	South Korea	1:42:28	>~>	
6	Elmira Kalimullina	Kazakhstan	1:43:21		
7	Ayumi Sugibayashi	Japan	1:46:13		
8	Violine Intan Puspita	Indonesia	1:51:00	>	
