= 2019 World Athletics Championships – Women's 20 kilometres walk =

Women's 20 kilometres walk at the 2019 World Championships
- Venue: Khalifa International Stadium
- Dates: 29 September
- Competitors: 45 from 31 nations
- Winning time: 1:32:53

Medalists
gold medal	Liu Hong	China
silver medal	Qieyang Shijie	China
bronze medal	Yang Liujing	China

The women's 20 kilometres race walk at the 2019 World Athletics Championships was held at the Khalifa International Stadium in Doha, Qatar, on 29 September 2019.

== Records ==
Before the competition records were as follows:

Record	Perf.	Athlete	Nat.	Date	Location
World	1:24:38	Liu Hong	CHN	6 Jun 2015	A Coruña, Spain
Championship	1:25:41	Olimpiada Ivanova	RUS	7 Aug 2005	Helsinki, Finland
World leading	1:24:31	Elena Lashmanova	RUS	18 Feb 2019	Sochi, Russia
African	1:30:40	Grace Wanjiru	KEN	6 Jun 2018	Nairobi, Kenya
Asian	1:24:38	Liu Hong	CHN	6 Jun 2015	A Coruña, Spain
NACAC	1:26:17	Lupita González	MEX	7 May 2016	Rome, Italy
South American	1:25:29	Glenda Morejón	ECU	8 Jun 2019	A Coruña, Spain
European	1:25:02	Elena Lashmanova	RUS	11 Augf 2012	London, Great Britain
Oceanian	1:27:44	Jane Saville	AUS	2 May 2004	Naumburg, Germany

== Schedule ==
The event schedule, in local time (UTC+3), was as follows:

Date	Time	Round
29 September	23:30	Final

== Results ==
The race was started at 23:59.

Rank	Name	Nationality	Time	Notes
1st place, gold medalist(s)	Liu Hong	China	1:32:53	
2nd place, silver medalist(s)	Qieyang Shijie	China	1:33:10	
3rd place, bronze medalist(s)	Yang Liujing	China	1:33:17	
4	Érica de Sena	Brazil	1:33:36	
5	Sandra Arenas	Colombia	1:34:16	
6	Kumiko Okada	Japan	1:34:36	
7	Nanako Fujii	Japan	1:34:50	
8	María Pérez	Spain	1:35:43	
9	Ana Cabecinha	Portugal	1:36:31	
10	Jemima Montag	Australia	1:36:54	
11	Saskia Feige	Germany	1:37:14	
12	Mirna Ortiz	Guatemala	1:37:32	
13	Antonella Palmisano	Italy	1:37:36	SB
14	Darya Paluektava	Belarus	1:37:42	
15	Raquel González	Spain	1:38:02	
16	Yehualeye Beletew	Ethiopia	1:38:11	
17	Valentina Trapletti	Italy	1:38:22	
18	Karla Jaramillo	Ecuador	1:38:26	
19	Anežka Drahotová	Czech Republic	1:38:29	
20	Nadiya Borovska	Ukraine	1:38:35	SB
21	Katarzyna Zdziebło	Poland	1:38:44	
22	Antigoni Drisbioti	Greece	1:38:56	
23	Živilė Vaiciukevičiūtė	Lithuania	1:39:26	
24	Meryem Bekmez	Turkey	1:39:36	
25	Glenda Morejón	Ecuador	1:39:38	
26	Grace Wanjiru	Kenya	1:39:58	
27	Alana Barber	New Zealand	1:40:59	
28	Ángela Castro	Bolivia	1:41:15	
29	Inna Loseva	Ukraine	1:41:44	
30	Ching Siu Nga	Hong Kong	1:42:55	
31	Yana Smerdova	Authorised Neutral Athletes	1:43:49	
32	Valeria Ortuño	Mexico	1:43:51	
33	Laura García-Caro	Spain	1:44:05	
34	Rachel Seaman	Canada	1:45:40	
35	Maria Michta-Coffey	United States	1:46:02	SB
36	Noelia Vargas	Costa Rica	1:46:30	
37	Ilse Guerrero	Mexico	1:46:32	
38	Mayra Herrera	Guatemala	1:46:42	
39	Viktória Madarász	Hungary	1:47:38	
	Leyde Guerra	Peru	DNF	
	Viviane Lyra	Brazil	DNF	
	Chahinez Nasri	Tunisia	DNF	
	Katie Hayward	Australia	DSQ	230.7(c)
	Ayşe Tekdal	Turkey	DSQ	230.7(c)
	Yang Jiayu	China	DSQ	230.7(c)
