= Mexico at the 2019 World Athletics Championships =

Mexico at the 2019 World Championships in Athletics
- WA code: MEX

in Doha
- Competitors: 11 (8 men and 3 women)
- Medals: Gold 0 Silver 0 Bronze 0 Total 0

World Championships in Athletics appearances
- 1976; 1980; 1983; 1987; 1991; 1993; 1995; 1997; 1999; 2001; 2003; 2005; 2007; 2009; 2011; 2013; 2015; 2017; 2019; 2022; 2023

Mexico competed at the 2019 World Athletics Championships in Doha, Qatar, from 27 September–6 October 2019.

== Result ==
Key

- Note–Ranks given for track events are for the entire round
- Q = Qualified for the next round
- q = Qualified for the next round as a fastest loser or, in field events, by position without achieving the qualifying target
- NR = National record
- GR = Games record
- PB = Personal best
- SB = Season best
- DNF = Did not finish
- DNS = Did not start
- NM = No mark
- N/A = Round not applicable for the event
- Bye = Athlete not required to compete in round

=== Men ===
Track and road events

Athlete	Event	Heat		Semifinal		Final	
Athlete	Event	Result	Rank	Result	Rank	Result	Rank
Fernando Vega	400 m hurdles	49.95	19 q	49.96	18	Did not advance	
Carlos Sánchez Cantera	20 km walk	—				DNF	
José Leyver Ojeda	20 km walk	—				DNF	
Julio César Salazar	20 km walk	—				1:33:02	20
Horacio Nava	50 km walk	—				4:24:16	18
Isaac Palma	50 km walk	—				DNF	

Field events

Athlete	Event	Qualification		Final	
Athlete	Event	Distance	Position	Distance	Position
Uziel Muñoz	Shot put	19.06	34	Did not advance	
Diego del Real	Hammer throw	73.15	21	Did not advance	

=== Women ===
Track and road events

Athlete	Event	Heat		Semifinal		Final	
Athlete	Event	Result	Rank	Result	Rank	Result	Rank
Paola Morán	400 m	51.58	15 Q	51.08	9	Did not advance	
Ilse Guerrero	20 km walk	—				1:46:32	37
Valeria Ortuño	20 km walk	—				1:43:51	32
