= 2025 World Athletics Championships – Men's 20 kilometres walk =

Men's 20 kilometres walk at the 2025 World Athletics Championships
- Venue: National Stadium
- Location: Tokyo, Japan
- Dates: 20 September
- Competitors: 48 from 26 nations
- Winning time: 1:18:35

Medalists
gold medal	Caio Bonfim	Brazil
silver medal	Wang Zhaozhao	China
bronze medal	Paul McGrath	Spain

The men's 20 kilometres walk at the 2025 World Athletics Championships was held at the National Stadium in Tokyo on 20 September 2025.

== Records ==
Before the competition records were as follows:

Record	Athlete & Nat.	Perf.	Location	Date
World Record	Toshikazu Yamanishi (JPN)	1:16:10	Kobe, Japan	16 February 2025
Championship Record	Jefferson Pérez (ECU)	1:17:21	Saint-Denis, France	23 August 2003
World Leading	Toshikazu Yamanishi (JPN)	1:16:10	Kobe, Japan	16 February 2025
African Record	Samuel Gathimba (KEN)	1:18:23	Nairobi, Kenya	18 June 2021
Asian Record	Toshikazu Yamanishi (JPN)	1:16:10	Kobe, Japan	16 February 2025
European Record	Yohann Diniz (FRA)	1:17:02	Arles, France	8 March 2015
North, Central American and Caribbean Record	Evan Dunfee (CAN)	1:17:39	Adelaide, Australia	16 February 2025
Oceanian Record	Nathan Deakes (AUS)	1:17:33	Cixi, China	23 April 2005
South American Record	Jefferson Pérez (ECU)	1:17:21	Saint-Denis, France	23 August 2003

== Qualification standard ==
The standard to qualify automatically for entry was 1:19:20.

== Schedule ==
The event schedule, in local time (UTC+9), was as follows:

Date	Time	Round
20 September	09:55	Final

== Results ==
The race was started on 20 September at 9:55.

Place	Athlete	Nation	Time	Warnings	Notes
1st place, gold medalist(s)	Caio Bonfim	Brazil	1:18:35	~ ~	
2nd place, silver medalist(s)	Wang Zhaozhao	China	1:18:43	~ ~	
3rd place, bronze medalist(s)	Paul McGrath	Spain	1:18:45	~ ~	
4	Aurélien Quinion	France	1:18:49	~	PB
5	Gabriel Bordier	France	1:19:23	~ ~	
6	Qian Haifeng	China	1:19:38		
7	Kento Yoshikawa	Japan	1:19:46		
8	Diego García	Spain	1:20:05		
9	Satoshi Maruo	Japan	1:20:09		
10	Christopher Linke	Germany	1:20:11		
11	Leo Köpp	Germany	1:20:35		
12	Ricardo Ortiz	Mexico	1:20:36	~ ~	
13	Perseus Karlström	Sweden	1:20:37		
14	Maher Ben Hlima	Poland	1:20:39	~	
15	Jordy Jiménez	Ecuador	1:20:43		
16	Francesco Fortunato	Italy	1:21:00		
17	Matheus Corrêa	Brazil	1:21:04	~	SB
18	Misgana Wakuma	Ethiopia	1:21:17	>	SB
19	David Hurtado	Ecuador	1:21:18	~ ~ ~ PZ	
20	Rhydian Cowley	Australia	1:21:18	~	
21	Álvaro López	Spain	1:21:28		
22	Dominik Černý	Slovakia	1:21:29		
23	Declan Tingay	Australia	1:21:30	~ >	
24	Li Chenjie	China	1:21:39		
25	Veli-Matti Partanen	Finland	1:21:41	~	SB
26	Mukola Rushchak	Ukraine	1:21:57		
27	Serhii Svitlychnyi	Ukraine	1:22:24	~	
28	Toshikazu Yamanishi	Japan	1:22:39	~ ~ ~ PZ	
29	Mateo Romero	Colombia	1:22:44		
30	Choe Byeong-kwang	South Korea	1:22:52		
31	Servin Sebastian	India	1:23:03	~	
32	Bence Venyercsán	Hungary	1:23:06	~	
33	Noel Chama	Mexico	1:23:41	> >	
34	Gianluca Picchiottino	Italy	1:23:50		
35	Mazlum Demir	Turkey	1:24:11		
36	Andrea Cosi	Italy	1:24:18	~ ~ ~ PZ	
37	Jerry Jokinen	Finland	1:24:37	~	
38	Érick Barrondo	Guatemala	1:24:42		SB
39	Tim Fraser	Australia	1:24:55	>	
40	César Herrera	Colombia	1:25:01	~	
41	Raivo Saulgriezis	Latvia	1:27:25	> > > PZ	
42	Max Batista Gonçalves dos Santos	Brazil	1:27:34	~	
43	Wayne Snyman	South Africa	1:30:12	~	SB
	Luis Henry Campos	Peru	DQ	~ > > ~	
	José Luis Doctor	Mexico	DQ	~ ~ > ~	
	Ihor Hlavan	Ukraine	DQ	~ > ~ ~	
	Hayrettin Yıldız	Turkey	DQ	> > > >	
	Alexandros Papamichail	Greece	DNS		

Key:	~ Red card for loss of contact	> Red card for bent knee	PZ 3.5 min. Penalty Zone	TR54.7.5: Disqualified by Rule TR54.7.5 (4 red cards)
