= Serena Sonoda =

Japanese race walker

Personal information
- Nationality: Japanese
- Born: 10 September 1996 (age 29)

Sport
- Sport: Athletics
- Event: Race walking

Serena Sonoda (園田 世玲奈, Sonoda Serena; born 10 September 1996) is a Japanese racewalking athlete. Representing Japan at the 2023 World Athletics Championships, she placed seventh in the women's 35 kilometres walk.

She competed in the women's 35 kilometres walk at the 2022 World Athletics Championships.
