= Mexico at the 2009 World Championships in Athletics =

- WA code: MEX

in Berlin
- Competitors: 18
- Medals: Gold 0 Silver 0 Bronze 1 Total 1

World Championships in Athletics appearances
- 1976; 1980; 1983; 1987; 1991; 1993; 1995; 1997; 1999; 2001; 2003; 2005; 2007; 2009; 2011; 2013; 2015; 2017; 2019; 2022; 2023; 2025

Mexico competed at the 2009 World Championships in Athletics from 15–23 August in Berlin.
