= Ecuador at the 2009 World Championships in Athletics =

- WA code: ECU

in Berlin
- Competitors: 10 (8 men, 2 women)
- Medals: Gold 0 Silver 0 Bronze 0 Total 0

World Championships in Athletics appearances
- 1983; 1987; 1991; 1993; 1995; 1997; 1999; 2001; 2003; 2005; 2007; 2009; 2011; 2013; 2015; 2017; 2019; 2022; 2023

Ecuador competes at the 2009 World Championships in Athletics from 15 to 23 August in Berlin.

== Team selection ==
Track and road events

Event	Athletes	
Event	Men	Women
100 metres	Franklin Nazareno	
200 metres	Franklin Nazareno	
800 metres	Byron Piedra	
1500 metres	Byron Piedra	
5000 metres	Byron Piedra	
20 km race walk	Mauricio Arteaga; Andrés Chocho; Rolando Saquipay	Johana Ordóñez
50 km race walk	Mesías Zapata	
Marathon	Franklin Tenorio	Sandra Ruales

Field and combined events

Event	Athletes	
Event	Men	Women
Long jump	Hugo Chila	
Triple jump	Hugo Chila	
