= Spain at the 2025 World Athletics Championships =

- Flag of Spain
- WA code: ESP

in Tokyo, Japan 13 September 2025 – 21 September 2025
- Competitors: 56 (26 men and 30 women)
- Medals Ranked 5th: Gold 2 Silver 0 Bronze 1 Total 3

World Athletics Championships appearances (overview)
- 1976; 1980; 1983; 1987; 1991; 1993; 1995; 1997; 1999; 2001; 2003; 2005; 2007; 2009; 2011; 2013; 2015; 2017; 2019; 2022; 2023; 2025

Spain competed at the 2025 World Athletics Championships in Tokyo, Japan, from 13 to 21 September 2025.

== Medallists ==
Medal	Athlete	Event	Date
Gold	María Pérez	Women's 35 kilometres walk	September 13
Gold	María Pérez	Women's 20 kilometres walk	September 20
Bronze	Paul McGrath	Men's 20 kilometres walk	September 20

== Results ==
Spain entered 56 athletes.

Key

- Q = Qualified for the next round
- q = Qualified for the next round as a fastest loser or, in field events, by position without achieving the qualifying target
- NR = National record
- PB = Personal best
- SB = Season best
- N/A = Round not applicable for the event

=== Men ===
Track and road events

Athlete	Event	Heat		Semifinal		Final	
Athlete	Event	Result	Rank	Result	Rank	Result	Rank
Mohamed Attaoui	800 metres	1:45.23	1 Q	1:43.18	1 Q	1:42.21 SB	5
David Barroso	800 metres	1:44.96	1 Q	1:44.27	6	Did not advance	
Mariano García	800 metres	1:47.09	4	Did not advance			
Adrián Ben	1500 metres	3:42.27	5 Q	3:36.78	2 Q	3:35.38	8
Pol Oriach	1500 metres	3:37.43	9	Did not advance			
Carlos Sáez	1500 metres	3:40.61	10	Did not advance			
Thierry Ndikumwenayo	5000 metres	13:47.72	14	—N/a		Did not advance	
Thierry Ndikumwenayo	10,000 metres	—N/a				28:59.07 SB	9
Enrique Llopis	110 metres hurdles	13.22	1 Q	13.29	2 Q	13.16	4
Asier Martínez	110 metres hurdles	13.63	7	Did not advance			
Jesús David Delgado	400 metres hurdles	48.98	7 q	49.41	8	Did not advance	
Daniel Arce	3000 metres steeplechase	DNF		—N/a		Did not advance	
Alejandro Quijada	3000 metres steeplechase	8:42.30	10	—N/a		Did not advance	
Diego García	20 kilometres walk	—N/a				1:20:05	8
Álvaro López	20 kilometres walk	—N/a				1:21:28	21
Paul McGrath	20 kilometres walk	—N/a				1:18:45	3rd place, bronze medalist(s)
Manuel Bermúdez	35 kilometres walk	—N/a				2:35:19	13
Daniel Chamosa	35 kilometres walk	—N/a				2:30:42	6
Miguel Ángel López	35 kilometres walk	—N/a				2:33:45	12

Field events

Athlete	Event	Qualification		Final	
Athlete	Event	Distance	Position	Distance	Position
Artur Coll	Pole vault	5.40	=26	Did not advance	
Jaime Guerra	Long jump	8.13	5 q	7.81	12
Lester Lescay	Long jump	8.21 SB	2 Q	7.97	8
Jordan Díaz	Triple jump	NM		Did not advance	
Diego Casas	Discus throw	62.54	21	Did not advance	

=== Women ===
Track and road events

Athlete	Event	Heat		Semifinal		Final	
Athlete	Event	Result	Rank	Result	Rank	Result	Rank
Jaël Bestué	200 metres	22.74	3 Q	22.80	6	Did not advance	
Paula Sevilla	400 metres	50.69 PB	4 q	50.97	7	Did not advance	
Rocío Arroyo	800 metres	2:01.34	5	Did not advance			
Lorea Ibarzabal	800 metres	2:00.60	5	Did not advance			
Marta Mitjans	800 metres	2:00.67	7	Did not advance			
Esther Guerrero	1500 metres	4:02.20	7	Did not advance			
Águeda Marqués	1500 metres	4:04.13	7	Did not advance			
Marta Pérez	1500 metres	4:05.14	5 Q	4:01.19	5 Q	3:58.54 SB	9
Marta García	5000 metres	14:56.96	4 Q	—N/a		15:01.02	7
Idaira Prieto	5000 metres	15:11.16	15	—N/a		Did not advance	
Laura Luengo	Marathon	—N/a				2:30:55 SB	11
Fatima Ouhaddou	Marathon	—N/a				2:35:05	24
Daniela Fra	400 metres hurdles	56.88	8	Did not advance			
Marta Serrano	3000 metres steeplechase	9:21.00 PB	7	—N/a		Did not advance	
Antía Chamosa	20 kilometres walk	—N/a				1:27.55 PB	7
Paula Juárez	20 kilometres walk	—N/a				1:31.50	22
María Pérez	20 kilometres walk	—N/a				1:25:54 SB	1st place, gold medalist(s)
Raquel González	35 kilometres walk	—N/a				2:45:41 SB	6
Cristina Montesinos	35 kilometres walk	—N/a				2:46:44	7
María Pérez	35 kilometres walk	—N/a				2:39:01	1st place, gold medalist(s)
Jaël Bestué; Esperança Cladera; María Isabel Pérez; Paula Sevilla	4 × 100 metres relay	42.53	2 Q	—N/a		42.47	5
Carmen Avilés; Blanca Hervás; Ana Prieto; Eva Santidrián	4 × 400 metres relay	3:24.76	5	—N/a		Did not advance	

Field events

Athlete	Event	Qualification		Final	
Athlete	Event	Distance	Position	Distance	Position
Fátima Diame	Long jump	DNS		Did not advance	
Irati Mitxelena	Long jump	6.27	28	Did not advance	

Combined events – Heptathlon

Athlete	Event	100H	HJ	SP	200 m	LJ	JT	800 m	Final	Rank
María Vicente	Result	13.65	1.77	13.34	23.96	6.10	44.58	2:16.80	6207	12
María Vicente	Points	1028	941	750	985	880	755	868	6207	12

=== Mixed ===
Track events

Athlete	Event	Heat		Final	
Athlete	Event	Result	Rank	Result	Rank
Blanca Hervás; Paula Sevilla; Julio Arenas; Bernat Erta	4 × 400 metres relay	3:12.57	4	Did not advance	
