= Ecuador at the 2015 World Championships in Athletics =

- WA code: ECU
- Website: www.pzla.pl

in Beijing
- Competitors: 5
- Medals: Gold 0 Silver 0 Bronze 0 Total 0

World Championships in Athletics appearances
- 1983; 1987; 1991; 1993; 1995; 1997; 1999; 2001; 2003; 2005; 2007; 2009; 2011; 2013; 2015; 2017; 2019; 2022; 2023; 2025

Ecuador competed at the 2015 World Championships in Athletics in Beijing, China, from 22 to 30 August 2015.

== Results ==
(q – qualified, NM – no mark, SB – season best, AR – area record)

=== Men ===
Track and road events

Athlete	Event	Heat		Semifinal		Final	
Athlete	Event	Result	Rank	Result	Rank	Result	Rank
Álex Quiñónez	200 metres	DQ		did not advance			
Mauricio Arteaga	20 kilometres walk	—N/a				1:25:50	37
Andrés Chocho	20 kilometres walk	—N/a				DQ	
Andrés Chocho	50 kilometres walk	—N/a				3:46:00 AR	8th

=== Women ===
Track and road events

Athlete	Event	Heat		Semifinal		Final	
Athlete	Event	Result	Rank	Result	Rank	Result	Rank
Narcisa Landazuri	100 metres	11.48	35	did not advance			
Paola Pérez	20 kilometres walk	—N/a				1:32:12	16
