= Mexico at the 2015 World Championships in Athletics =

- WA code: MEX

in Beijing
- Competitors: 5
- Medals: Gold 0 Silver 0 Bronze 0 Total 0

World Championships in Athletics appearances
- 1976; 1980; 1983; 1987; 1991; 1993; 1995; 1997; 1999; 2001; 2003; 2005; 2007; 2009; 2011; 2013; 2015; 2017; 2019; 2022; 2023; 2025

Mexico competed at the 2015 World Championships in Athletics in Beijing, China, from 22 to 30 August 2015.

== Results ==
(q – qualified, NM – no mark, SB – season best)

=== Men ===
Track and road events

Athlete	Event	Heat		Semifinal		Final	
Athlete	Event	Result	Rank	Result	Rank	Result	Rank
Horacio Nava	20 kilometres walk	—N/a				1:24:40 SB	28
Julio César Salazar	20 kilometres walk	—N/a				1:24:58	31
Eder Sánchez	20 kilometres walk	—N/a				1:21:56 SB	15

=== Women ===
Track and road events

Athlete	Event	Heat		Semifinal		Final	
Athlete	Event	Result	Rank	Result	Rank	Result	Rank
Brenda Flores	10,000 metres	—N/a				32:15.26	14
Alejandra Ortega	20 kilometres walk	—N/a				1:31:04 PB	9
