= Mexico at the 2017 World Championships in Athletics =

- Flag of Mexico
- WA code: MEX
- National federation: Federation of Mexican Athletics Associations
- Website: fmaa.mx (in Spanish)

in London, United Kingdom 4–13 August 2017
- Competitors: 15 (11 men and 4 women) in 10 events
- Medals Ranked =31th: Gold 0 Silver 1 Bronze 0 Total 1

World Championships in Athletics appearances
- 1976; 1980; 1983; 1987; 1991; 1993; 1995; 1997; 1999; 2001; 2003; 2005; 2007; 2009; 2011; 2013; 2015; 2017; 2019; 2022; 2023; 2025

Mexico competed at the 2017 World Championships in Athletics in London, United Kingdom, from 4–13 August 2017.

== Medalists ==
The following competitors from Mexico won medals at the Championships.

Medal	Athlete	Event	Date
Silver	Lupita González	Women's 20 km walk	13 August

== Results ==
=== Men ===
Track and road events

Athlete	Event	Heat		Semifinal		Final	
Athlete	Event	Result	Rank	Result	Rank	Result	Rank
Jesús Tonatiu López	800 metres	1:46.71	22	Did not advance			
Ricardo Ramos	Marathon	—N/a				2:41.50 SB	70
Pedro Daniel Gómez	20 kilometres walk	—N/a				1:24:11	43
Eder Sánchez	20 kilometres walk	—N/a				DNF	–
Jesús Tadeo Vega	20 kilometres walk	—N/a				1:23:10 SB	35
Horacio Nava	50 kilometres walk	—N/a				3:47:53 SB	16
José Levyer Ojeda	50 kilometres walk	—N/a				3:51:17	21
Omar Zepeda	50 kilometres walk	—N/a				DQ	–

Field events

Athlete	Event	Qualification		Final	
Athlete	Event	Distance	Position	Distance	Position
Edgar Rivera	High jump	2.29	11 q	2.29	4
Alberto Álvarez	Triple jump	16.48	20	Did not advance	
Diego del Real	Hammer throw	71.29	26	Did not advance	

=== Women ===
Track and road events

Athlete	Event	Final	
Athlete	Event	Result	Rank
Margarita Hernández	10,000 metres	33:06.53	29
Lupita González	20 kilometres walk	1:26:19 SB	2nd place, silver medalist(s)
María Guadalupe Sánchez	20 kilometres walk	DQ	–

Field events

Athlete	Event	Qualification		Final	
Athlete	Event	Distance	Position	Distance	Position
Jessamyn Sauceda	Long jump	5.61	29	Did not advance	
