= Spain at the 2023 World Athletics Championships =

- Flag of Spain
- WA code: ESP

in Budapest, Hungary 19 August 2023 – 27 August 2023
- Competitors: 58 (27 men and 31 women)
- Medals Ranked 3rd: Gold 4 Silver 1 Bronze 0 Total 5

World Athletics Championships appearances (overview)
- 1976; 1980; 1983; 1987; 1991; 1993; 1995; 1997; 1999; 2001; 2003; 2005; 2007; 2009; 2011; 2013; 2015; 2017; 2019; 2022; 2023; 2025

Spain competed at the 2023 World Athletics Championships in Budapest, Hungary, from 19 to 27 August 2023.

== Medalists ==
| Medal | Athlete | Event | Date |
|---|---|---|---|
| Gold | Álvaro Martín | Men's 20 kilometres walk | August 19 |
| Gold | María Pérez | Women's 20 kilometres walk | August 20 |
| Gold | Álvaro Martín | Men's 35 kilometres walk | August 24 |
| Gold | María Pérez | Women's 35 kilometres walk | August 24 |
| Silver | Mohamed Katir | Men's 5000 metres | August 27 |

== Results ==
Spain entered 58 athletes. Reserve athletes that did not compete include Esther Navero and María Isabel Pérez (for the women's 4 x 100 relay), David García Zurita (for the men's 4 x 400 relay) and Carmen Avilés (for the women's 4 x 400 relay).

Key

- Q = Qualified for the next round
- q = Qualified for the next round as a fastest loser or, in field events, by position without achieving the qualifying target
- NR = National record
- PB = Personal best
- SB = Season best
- N/A = Round not applicable for the event

=== Men ===
Track and road events

| Athlete | Event | Heat | | Semifinal | | Final | |
| Athlete | Event | Result | Rank | Result | Rank | Result | Rank |
|---|---|---|---|---|---|---|---|
| Mohammed Attaoui | 800 metres | 1:46.65 | 3 Q | 1:44.35 PB | 5 | Did not advance | |
| Adrián Ben | 800 metres | 1:45.37 | 1 Q | 1:43.92 PB | 2 Q | 1:44.91 | 4 |
| Saúl Ordóñez | 800 metres | 1:47.97 | 3 Q | 1:44.74 | 3 | Did not advance | |
| Mario García | 1500 metres | 3:46.77 | 1 Q | 3:35.26 | 4 Q | 3:30.26 | 6 |
| Adel Mechaal | 1500 metres | 3:34.35 | 4 Q | 3:33.33 | 9 | Did not advance | |
| Mohamed Katir | 1500 metres | 3:34.34 | 2 Q | 3:33.56 | 10 | Did not advance | |
| Mohamed Katir | 5000 metres | 13:35.90 | 1 Q | —N/a | | 13:11.44 | 2nd place, silver medalist(s) |
| Thierry Ndikumwenayo | 5000 metres | 13:34.03 | 9 | —N/a | | Did not advance | |
| Ouassim Oumaiz | 5000 metres | 13:36.35 | 4 Q | —N/a | | 13:31.99 | 16 |
| Ibrahim Chakir | Marathon | —N/a | | | | 2:13:44 | 24 |
| Ayad Lamdassem | Marathon | —N/a | | | | 2:12:59 | 22 |
| Tariku Novales | Marathon | —N/a | | | | 2:12:39 SB | 21 |
| Enrique Llopis | 110 metres hurdles | 13.33 SB | 2 Q | 13.30 =PB | 3 | Did not advance | |
| Sergio Fernández | 400 metres hurdles | 49.26 | 5 | Did not advance | | | |
| Daniel Arce | 3000 metres steeplechase | 8:20.46 | 4 Q | —N/a | | 8:18.31 | 9 |
| Víctor Ruiz | 3000 metres steeplechase | 8:20.54 | 6 | —N/a | | Did not advance | |
| Alberto Amezcua | 20 kilometres walk | —N/a | | | | 1:19:28 PB | 13 |
| Diego García | 20 kilometres walk | —N/a | | | | 1:25:12 | 39 |
| Álvaro Martín | 20 kilometres walk | —N/a | | | | 1:17:32 WL | 1st place, gold medalist(s) |
| Álvaro Martín | 35 kilometres walk | —N/a | | | | 2:24:30 NR | 1st place, gold medalist(s) |
| Miguel Ángel López | 35 kilometres walk | —N/a | | | | 2:29.32 | 12 |
| Marc Tur | 35 kilometres walk | —N/a | | | | 2:36.04 | 22 |
| Iñaki Cañal; Bernat Erta; Samuel García; Óscar Husillos | 4 × 400 metres relay | 3:02.64 SB | 8 | —N/a | | Did not advance | |

Field events

| Athlete | Event | Qualification | | Final | |
| Athlete | Event | Distance | Position | Distance | Position |
|---|---|---|---|---|---|
| Jaime Guerra | Long jump | 7.35 | 35 | Did not advance | |
| Yasiel Sotero | Discus throw | 55.89 | 34 | Did not advance | |

=== Women ===
Track and road events

| Athlete | Event | Heat | | Semifinal | | Final | |
| Athlete | Event | Result | Rank | Result | Rank | Result | Rank |
|---|---|---|---|---|---|---|---|
| Jaël Bestué | 100 metres | 11.28 | 3 Q | 11.25 | 7 | Did not advance | |
| Jaël Bestué | 200 metres | 22.58 | 3 Q | 22.60 | 5 | Did not advance | |
| Daniela García | 800 metres | 2:00.92 | 7 | Did not advance | | | |
| Lorea Ibarzabal | 800 metres | 2:06.33 | 7 | Did not advance | | | |
| Lorena Martín | 800 metres | 2:01.25 | 5 | Did not advance | | | |
| Esther Guerrero | 1500 metres | 4:04.33 | 6 Q | 4:00.13 PB | 10 | Did not advance | |
| Águeda Marqués | 1500 metres | 4:06.41 | 8 | Did not advance | | | |
| Marta Pérez | 1500 metres | 4:01.41 SB | 5 Q | 4:02.96 | 7 | Did not advance | |
| Marta Galimany | Marathon | —N/a | | | | 2:37:10 SB | 38 |
| Fatima Ouhaddou | Marathon | —N/a | | | | DNF | |
| Meritxell Soler | Marathon | —N/a | | | | 2:34:38 | 27 |
| Carolina Robles | 3000 metres steeplechase | 9:34.41 | 8 | —N/a | | Did not advance | |
| Irene Sánchez-Escribano | 3000 metres steeplechase | 9:31.97 | 9 | —N/a | | Did not advance | |
| Marta Serrano | 3000 metres steeplechase | 9:31.82 | 9 | —N/a | | Did not advance | |
| Antia Chamosa | 20 kilometres walk | —N/a | | | | 1:34:20 | 28 |
| María Pérez | 20 kilometres walk | —N/a | | | | 1:26:51 | 1st place, gold medalist(s) |
| María Pérez | 35 kilometres walk | —N/a | | | | 2:24:30 NR | 1st place, gold medalist(s) |
| Raquel González | 35 kilometres walk | —N/a | | | | 2:51:53 | 13 |
| Cristina Montesinos | 35 kilometres walk | —N/a | | | | 2:45:42 PB | 5 |
| Jaël Bestué; Lucía Carrillo; Carmen Marco; Paula Sevilla | 4 × 100 metres relay | 42.96 SB | 6 | —N/a | | Did not advance | |
| Laura Bueno; Bárbara Camblor; Herminia Parra; Eva Santidrián | 4 × 400 metres relay | 3:31.91 | 7 | —N/a | | Did not advance | |

Field events

| Athlete | Event | Qualification | | Final | |
| Athlete | Event | Distance | Position | Distance | Position |
|---|---|---|---|---|---|
| Fátima Diame | Long jump | 6.61 | 12 q | 6.82 =PB | 6 |
| Tessy Ebosele | Long jump | 6.65 | 11 q | 6.62 | 8 |
| María Vicente | Long jump | 6.59 | 14 | Did not advance | |
| María Vicente | Triple jump | 14.13 | 13 | Did not advance | |
| Laura Redondo | Hammer throw | 66.95 | 29 | Did not advance | |
