= Mexico at the 2013 World Championships in Athletics =

- WA code: MEX

in Moscow
- Competitors: 16
- Medals: Gold 0 Silver 0 Bronze 1 Total 1

World Championships in Athletics appearances
- 1976; 1980; 1983; 1987; 1991; 1993; 1995; 1997; 1999; 2001; 2003; 2005; 2007; 2009; 2011; 2013; 2015; 2017; 2019; 2022; 2023; 2025

Mexico is competing at the 2013 World Championships in Athletics in Moscow, Russia, from 10 to 18 August 2013. A team of 16 athletes was announced to represent the country in the event.

== Results ==
(q – qualified, NM – no mark, SB – season best)

=== Men ===
Track and road events

Athlete	Event	Preliminaries		Heats		Semifinals		Final	
Athlete	Event	Time	Rank	Time	Rank	Time	Rank	Time	Rank
James Eichberger	800 metres			1:47.96	32	did not advance			
Diego Estrada	5000 metres			13:48.30	25			did not advance	
Juan Luis Barrios	10,000 metres							DNF	-
José Antonio Uribe	Marathon								
Diego Flores	20 kilometres walk							1:26:46	32
Isaac Palma	20 kilometres walk							1:28:14	37
Horacio Nava	50 kilometres walk							3:58:09	32
Omar Segura	50 kilometres walk							3:58:34	35
Omar Zepeda	50 kilometres walk							3:50:43	19

Field events

Athlete	Event	Preliminaries		Final	
Athlete	Event	Width Height	Rank	Width Height	Rank
Luis Rivera	Long jump	8.04	5 q	8.27	3rd place, bronze medalist(s)
Edgar Rivera	High jump	2.22	22	did not advance	

=== Women ===
Track and road events

Athlete	Event	Preliminaries		Heats		Semifinals		Final	
Athlete	Event	Time	Rank	Time	Rank	Time	Rank	Time	Rank
Marisol Romero	10,000 metres							32:16.36	11
Madaí Perez	Marathon							2:34:23	7
Yanelli Caballero	20 kilometres walk							1:32:37	25
Mónica Equihua	20 kilometres walk							1:36:46	52
Lizbeth Silva	20 kilometres walk							DQ	-
