= Mexico at the 2011 World Championships in Athletics =

- WA code: MEX
- National federation: Federación Mexicana de Asociaciones de Atletismo
- Website: www.atletismofma.com.mx

in Daegu
- Competitors: 10
- Medals: Gold 0 Silver 0 Bronze 0 Total 0

World Championships in Athletics appearances
- 1976; 1980; 1983; 1987; 1991; 1993; 1995; 1997; 1999; 2001; 2003; 2005; 2007; 2009; 2011; 2013; 2015; 2017; 2019; 2022; 2023; 2025

Mexico competed at the 2011 World Championships in Athletics from August 27 to September 4 in Daegu, South Korea. A team of 10 athletes was announced to represent the country in the event. The team was led by race walker Eder Sánchez, bronze medalist at the last world championships.

== Results ==
=== Men ===
Athlete	Event	Preliminaries		Heats		Semifinals		Final	
Athlete	Event	Time Width Height	Rank	Time Width Height	Rank	Time Width Height	Rank	Time Width Height	Rank
Juan Carlos Romero Bernal	10,000 metres							29:38.38	16
Eder Sánchez Terán	20 kilometres walk							1:23:05	15
Horacio Nava Reza	20 kilometres walk							1:24:15	20
Diego Flores Hinojosa	20 kilometres walk							1:30:00	35
Edgar Hernández Martínez	50 kilometres walk							3:54:46 SB	18
José Leyver Ojeda Blas	50 kilometres walk							3:55:37	19
Omar Zepeda León	50 kilometres walk							3:56:41	21
Edgar Rivera Morales	High jump	2.21	26					Did not advance	
Giovanni Alessandro Lanaro Mercado	Pole vault	5.50	21					Did not advance	

=== Women ===
Athlete	Event	Preliminaries		Heats		Semifinals		Final	
Athlete	Event	Time Width Height	Rank	Time Width Height	Rank	Time Width Height	Rank	Time Width Height	Rank
María Guadalupe Sánchez Gómez	20 kilometres walk							DSQ	
