= Ecuador at the 2011 World Championships in Athletics =

- WA code: ECU
- National federation: Federación Ecuatoriana de Atletismo

in Daegu
- Competitors: 5
- Medals: Gold 0 Silver 0 Bronze 0 Total 0

World Championships in Athletics appearances
- 1983; 1987; 1991; 1993; 1995; 1997; 1999; 2001; 2003; 2005; 2007; 2009; 2011; 2013; 2015; 2017; 2019; 2022; 2023

Ecuador competed at the 2011 World Championships in Athletics from August 27 to September 4 in Daegu, South Korea.

== Team selection ==
A team of 6 athletes was announced to represent the country in the event.

The following athletes appeared on the preliminary Entry List, but not on the Official Start List of the specific event, resulting in total number of 5 competitors:

KEY:	Did not participate	Competed in another event

	Event	Athlete
Men	20 kilometres walk	Andrés Chocho
Men	50 kilometres walk	Rolando Saquipay

== Results ==
=== Men ===
Athlete	Event	Preliminaries		Heats		Semifinals		Final	
Athlete	Event	Time Width Height	Rank	Time Width Height	Rank	Time Width Height	Rank	Time Width Height	Rank
Bayron Piedra	10,000 metres							DNF	
Mauricio Arteaga	20 kilometres walk							DNF	
Andrés Chocho	50 kilometres walk							3:49:32 AR	11
Diego Ferrín	High jump	2.21	23					Did not advance	

=== Women ===
Athlete	Event	Preliminaries		Heats		Semifinals		Final	
Athlete	Event	Time Width Height	Rank	Time Width Height	Rank	Time Width Height	Rank	Time Width Height	Rank
Yadira Guamán	20 kilometres walk							1:45:15	39
