= Galina Yakusheva =

Kazakhstani race walker

Personal information
- Nationality: Kazakhstani
- Born: 14 July 1988 (age 37)

Sport
- Country: Kazakhstan
- Sport: Athletics
- Event: Racewalking

Achievements and titles
- Personal best(s): 20 kilometres walk: 1:32:55 (2021); 35 kilometres walk: 2:54:50 (2022)

Galina Yakusheva (Russian: Гали́на Яку́шева; born 14 July 1988) is a Kazakhstani race walker. She represented Kazakhstan at the 2022 World Athletics Championships, competing in 20 kilometres walk and 35 kilometres walk.
