= Ecuador at the 2013 World Championships in Athletics =

- WA code: ECU

in Moscow
- Competitors: 12
- Medals: Gold 0 Silver 0 Bronze 0 Total 0

World Championships in Athletics appearances
- 1983; 1987; 1991; 1993; 1995; 1997; 1999; 2001; 2003; 2005; 2007; 2009; 2011; 2013; 2015; 2017; 2019; 2022; 2023

Ecuador competed at the 2013 World Championships in Athletics in Moscow, Russia, from 10–18 August 2013. A team of 12 athletes was announced to represent the country in the event.

== Results ==
(q – qualified, NM – no mark, SB – season best)

=== Men ===
Track and road events

Athlete	Event	Preliminaries		Heats		Semifinals		Final	
Athlete	Event	Time	Rank	Time	Rank	Time	Rank	Time	Rank
Álex Quiñónez	100 metres								
Álex Quiñónez	200 metres								
Bayron Piedra	5000 metres								
Miguel Ángel Almachi	Men's Marathon								
Mauricio Arteaga	20 kilometres walk								
Rolando Saquipay	20 kilometres walk								
Jonnathan Caceres	50 kilometres walk								
Andrés Chocho	50 kilometres walk								
Xavier Moreno	50 kilometres walk								

Field events

Athlete	Event	Preliminaries		Final	
Athlete	Event	Width Height	Rank	Width Height	Rank
Diego Ferrin	High jump				

=== Women ===
Athlete	Event	Preliminaries		Heats		Semifinals		Final	
Athlete	Event	Time	Rank	Time	Rank	Time	Rank	Time	Rank
Ángela Tenorio	100 metres								
Ángela Tenorio	200 metres								
Rosa Chacha	Marathon								
Paola Perez	20 kilometres walk								
