= Yang Liujing =

Chinese racewalker (born 1998)

Personal information
- Nationality: Chinese
- Born: 22 August 1998 (age 27) Ankang, China

Sport
- Country: China
- Sport: Athletics
- Event: Racewalking

Achievements and titles
- Personal best(s): 10 km walk: 43:22; 20 km walk: 1:25:59
Medal record
Representing China
World Championships
Bronze medal – third place	2019 Doha	20 km walk
Asian Athletics Championships
Gold medal – first place	2023 Bangkok	20 km walk
- Updated on 16 July 2023

Yang Liujing (Chinese: 杨柳静; born 22 August 1998) is a Chinese racewalker.

She won the bronze medal at the 2019 World Athletics Championships in Doha.
