= Qieyang Shijie =

Chinese racewalker (born 1990)

Personal information
- Nationality: Chinese
- Born: 11 November 1990 (age 35) Haiyan County, Qinghai, China
- Height: 1.60 m (5 ft 3 in)
- Weight: 50 kg (110 lb)

Sport
- Country: China
- Sport: Athletics
- Event: Racewalking
Medal record
Women's athletics
Representing China
Olympic Games
Gold medal – first place	2012 London	20 km walk
World Championships
Silver medal – second place	2019 Doha	20 km walk
Bronze medal – third place	2011 Daegu	20 km walk
Bronze medal – third place	2022 Eugene	20 km walk
Bronze medal – third place	2022 Eugene	35 km walk
Asian Games
Gold medal – first place	2022 Hangzhou	Mixed team 35 km walk
Silver medal – second place	2018 Jakarta	20 km walk

Qieyang Shijie (Chinese: 切阳什姐; pinyin: Qièyáng Shíjiě; Tibetan: ཆོས་དབྱིངས་སྐྱིད་, Wylie: chos dbyings skyid, ZWPY: Qoiying Gyi, Lhasa dialect: [tɕʰǿjiŋ cîʔ], Amdo Tibetan language: [tɕʰeɣjaŋ ʂcəl]; born 11 November 1990), also known as Qieyang Shenjie or Choeyang Kyi; is a Chinese race walker.

She represented China three times at the Summer Olympics and won gold at the 2012 Summer Olympics in London, England, United Kingdom. As a result, she became the first ethnic Tibetan to compete at the Olympics and the first to win an Olympic medal.

== Personal life ==
Qieyang Shijie was born in Haiyan, Haibei T.A.P, Qinghai province on 11 November 1990. Her family are Tibetan herders.

== Career ==
She was selected into the Qinghai Team in April 2008 by Yuan Dejiu, the major coach of the team who found her speciality when let accompany someone other to run and gave her her nickname "little tokyi".

Qieyang Shijie made her Olympic debut at the 2012 Summer Olympics in London, England, United Kingdom. Originally, she won a bronze medal in the women's 20 km racewalk. However, Olga Kaniskina was disqualified in March 2016 for doping and Qieyang Shijie was upgraded to silver. The subsequent disqualification of Elena Lashmanova saw Qieyang Shijie promoted to gold. She is the first ethnic Tibetan to compete at the Olympics and the first to win an Olympic medal.

Four years later at the 2016 Summer Olympics in Rio de Janeiro, Brazil, she finished the women's 20 km racewalk in fifth place.

After winning the medal, Qieyang Shijie said she was most grateful to her coach.

At the 2020 Summer Olympics in Tokyo, Japan, Qieyang Shijie finished seventh in the women's 20 km racewalk.
