= Perseus Karlström =

Swedish racewalker (born 1990)

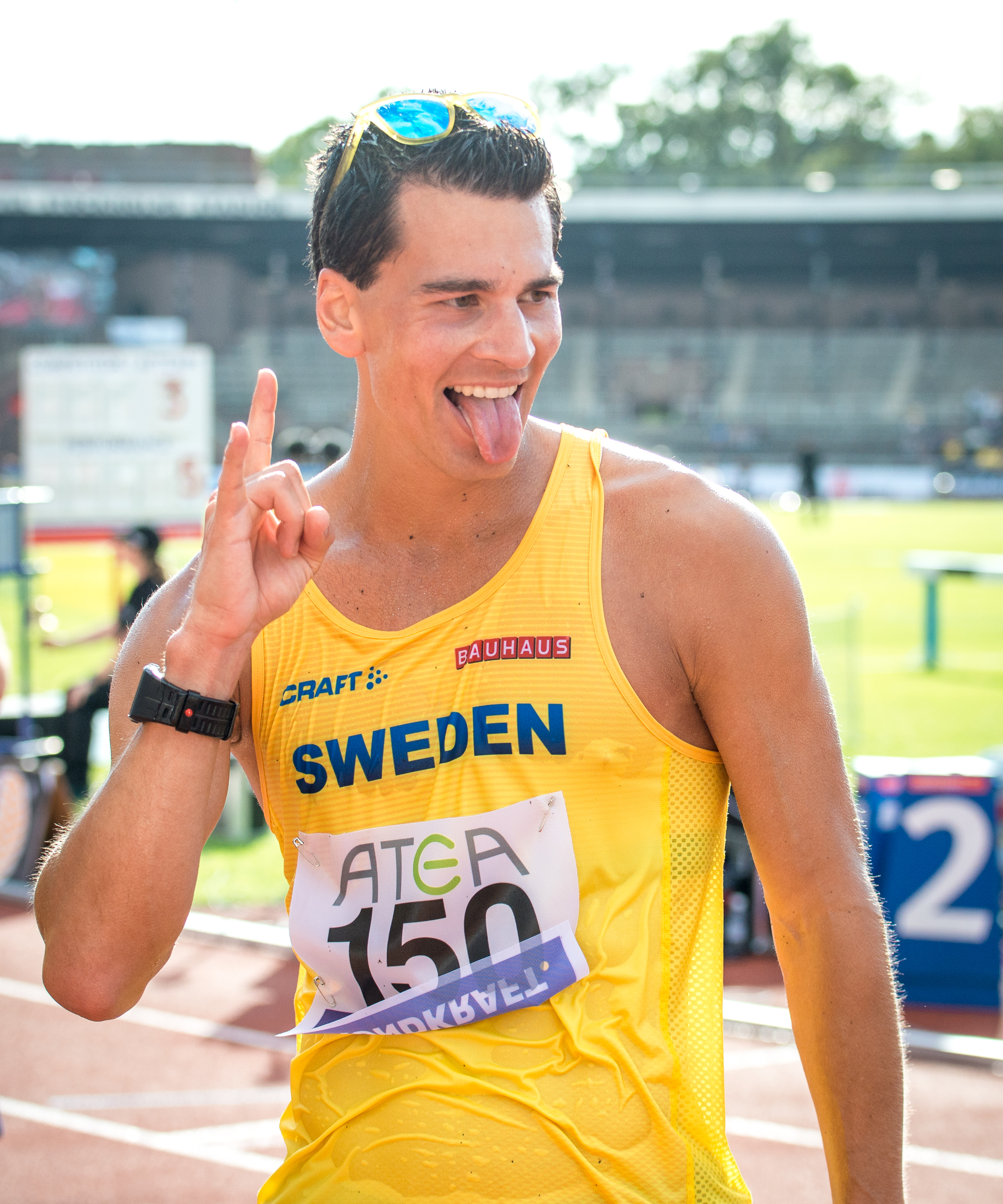
- Karlström in 2019

Personal information
- Nationality: Swedish
- Born: Perseus Ibáñez; 2 May 1990 (age 36) Stora Sundby, Eskilstuna, Sweden
- Height: 1.84 m (6 ft 0 in)
- Weight: 73 kg (161 lb)

Sport
- Country: Sweden
- Sport: Athletics
- Event: Racewalking
Medal record
Men's athletics
Representing Sweden
World Championships
Silver medal – second place	2023 Budapest	20 km walk
Bronze medal – third place	2019 Doha	20 km walk
Bronze medal – third place	2022 Eugene	20 km walk
Bronze medal – third place	2022 Eugene	35 km walk
European Championships
Gold medal – first place	2024 Rome	20 km walk
Silver medal – second place	2022 Munich	20 km walk

Perseus Karlström (born 2 May 1990) is a Swedish male racewalker. He competed in the 20 kilometres walk event at the 2013 World Championships in Athletics. He also competed in the 20 kilometres walk event at the 2015 World Championships in Athletics in Beijing, China, but did not finish. He was bronze medallist at the 2019 World Athletics Championships in Qatar 2019.

Born in Stora Sundby, Eskilstuna, he is the son of international racewalker Siv Gustavsson. His brother, Ato Ibáñez, is also an international racewalker for Sweden.

== See also ==
- Sweden at the 2015 World Championships in Athletics
