= Alejandra Ortega =

Mexican racewalker (born 1994)

Personal information
- Full name: Alejandra Ortega Solís
- Born: 8 July 1994 (age 32) Mexico City, Mexico
- Height: 1.66 m (5 ft 5 in) (2024)
- Weight: 56 kg (123 lb)

Sport
- Country: Mexico
- Sport: Race walking
- Event: 20 km race walk
Medal record
Women's athletics
Representing Mexico
World Team Championships
Silver medal – second place	2026 Brasília	Half marathon walk
Pan American Championships
Bronze medal – third place	2026 Medellín	Half marathon walk
Central American and Caribbean Games
Gold medal – first place	2023 San Salvador	20 km walk
Silver medal – second place	2026 Santo Domingo	Half marathon walk
World Team Championships (U20)
Silver medal – second place	2012 Saransk	10 km walk
Pan American Cup (U20)
Gold medal – first place	2013 Guatemala City	10 km walk
Gold medal – first place	2013 Guatemala City	10 km walk (team)
Central American and Caribbean Junior Championships
Gold medal – first place	2012 San Salvador	5,000 m walk

Alejandra Ortega Solís (Note: In this Spanish name, the first or paternal surname is Ortega and the second or maternal family name is Solís.) (born 8 July 1994 in Mexico City) is a female racewalker from Mexico. She competed in the Women's 20 kilometres walk event at the 2015 World Championships in Athletics in Beijing, China, where she finished 9th and at the 2015 Pan American Games where she finished 8th. She competed in the 2016 Olympics, finishing 41st.

She was the gold medalist in the junior race at the 2013 Pan American Race Walking Cup, vanquishing her closest competitor by more than two minutes. The previous year she was the silver medalist at the 2012 IAAF World Race Walking Cup, where she set the North American Junior Record at 46:00. She was also champion at the 2012 Central American and Caribbean Junior Championships in Athletics.

== See also ==
- Mexico at the 2015 World Championships in Athletics
