= Ilse Guerrero =

Mexican racewalker (born 1993)

Personal information
- Full name: Ilse Adriana Guerrero Rodarte
- Born: 24 March 1993 (age 33) Guadalupe, Zacatecas, Mexico
- Height: 1.56 m (5 ft 1 in)

Sport
- Country: Mexico
- Event: Racewalking

Ilse Adriana Guerrero Rodarte (born 24 March 1993) is a Mexican racewalker. She competed in the women's 20 kilometres walk event at the 2019 World Athletics Championships held in Doha, Qatar. She finished in 37th place with a time of 1:46:32.

In 2019, she competed in the women's 20 kilometres walk event at the Pan American Games held in Lima, Peru. She finished in 4th place with a personal best of 1:30:54. As a result, she represented Mexico in the women's 20 kilometres walk at the 2020 Summer Olympics in Tokyo, Japan.
