= Julio César Salazar =

Mexican racewalker

Personal information
- Full name: Julio César Salazar Enríquez
- Born: 8 July 1993 (age 32) Chihuahua, Chihuahua, Mexico
- Education: Autonomous University of Chihuahua

Sport
- Sport: Track and field
- Event: Racewalking
Medal record
Men's athletics
Representing Mexico
CAC Championships
Silver medal – second place	2013 Morelia	20 km walk
- Updated on 1 September 2015

Julio César Salazar Enríquez (born 8 July 1993) is a Mexican racewalker. He competed in the 20 kilometres walk event at the 2015 World Championships in Athletics in Beijing, China and at the 2015 Pan American Games in Toronto, Canada. In 2019, he competed in the men's 20 kilometres walk at the 2019 World Athletics Championships held in Doha, Qatar. He finished in 20th place.

== See also ==
- Mexico at the 2015 World Championships in Athletics
