= Andrés Olivas (racewalker) =

Mexican racewalker (born 1998)

Andrés Eduardo Olivas
Personal information
- Full name: Andrés Eduardo Olivas Núñez
- Born: 27 May 1998 (age 28) Chihuahua, Chihuahua, Mexico
- Height: 175 cm (5 ft 9 in)

Sport
- Sport: Athletics
- Event: Racewalking
Medal record
Men's athletics
Representing Mexico
Pan American Games
Bronze medal – third place	2023 Santiago	20 km walk

Andrés Eduardo Olivas Núñez (Note: In this Spanish name, the first or paternal surname is Olivas and the second or maternal family name is Núñez.) (born 27 May 1998) is a Mexican racewalking athlete. He qualified to represent Mexico at the 2020 Summer Olympics, competing in the men's 20 kilometres walk.
