= Karla Jaramillo =

Ecuadorian racewalker (born 1997)

Personal information
- Full name: Karla Johanna Jaramillo Navarrate
- Born: 21 January 1997 (age 29) Ibarra, Ecuador
- Height: 1.58 m (5 ft 2 in)
- Weight: 52 kg (115 lb)

Sport
- Sport: Athletics
- Event: Race walking
Medal record
Representing Ecuador
Women's athletics
World Team Championships
Gold medal – first place	2022 Muscat	35 km walk (team)
Gold medal – first place	2026 Brasília	Marathon walk (team)
Pan American Cup
Silver medal – second place	2021 Guayaquil	20 km walk
Bronze medal – third place	2019 Lázaro Cárdenas	20 km walk
South American Games
Silver medal – second place	2022 Asunción	35 km walk
South American Championships
Gold medal – first place	2019 Lima	20,000 m walk
South American Race Walking Championships
Gold medal – first place	2020 Lima	20 km walk
Bolivarian Games
Gold medal – first place	2022 Valledupar	20 km walk
Pan American U20 Championships
Silver medal – second place	2015 Edmonton	10,000 m walk
South American U23 Championships
Silver medal – second place	2018 Cuenca	20,000 m walk

Karla Johanna Jaramillo Navarrate (born 21 January 1997) is an Ecuadorian racewalking athlete. She won a gold medal in 20 km walk at the 2019 South American Championships in Athletics, setting Ecuadorian record and South American record in 20 km track walk. She placed eighth in women's 20 kilometres walk at the 2019 Pan American Games. Representing Ecuador at the 2019 World Athletics Championships, she placed 18th in the women's 20 kilometres walk.

She represented Ecuador at the 2020 Summer Olympics.
