= Brian Pintado =

Ecuadorian racewalker (born 1995)

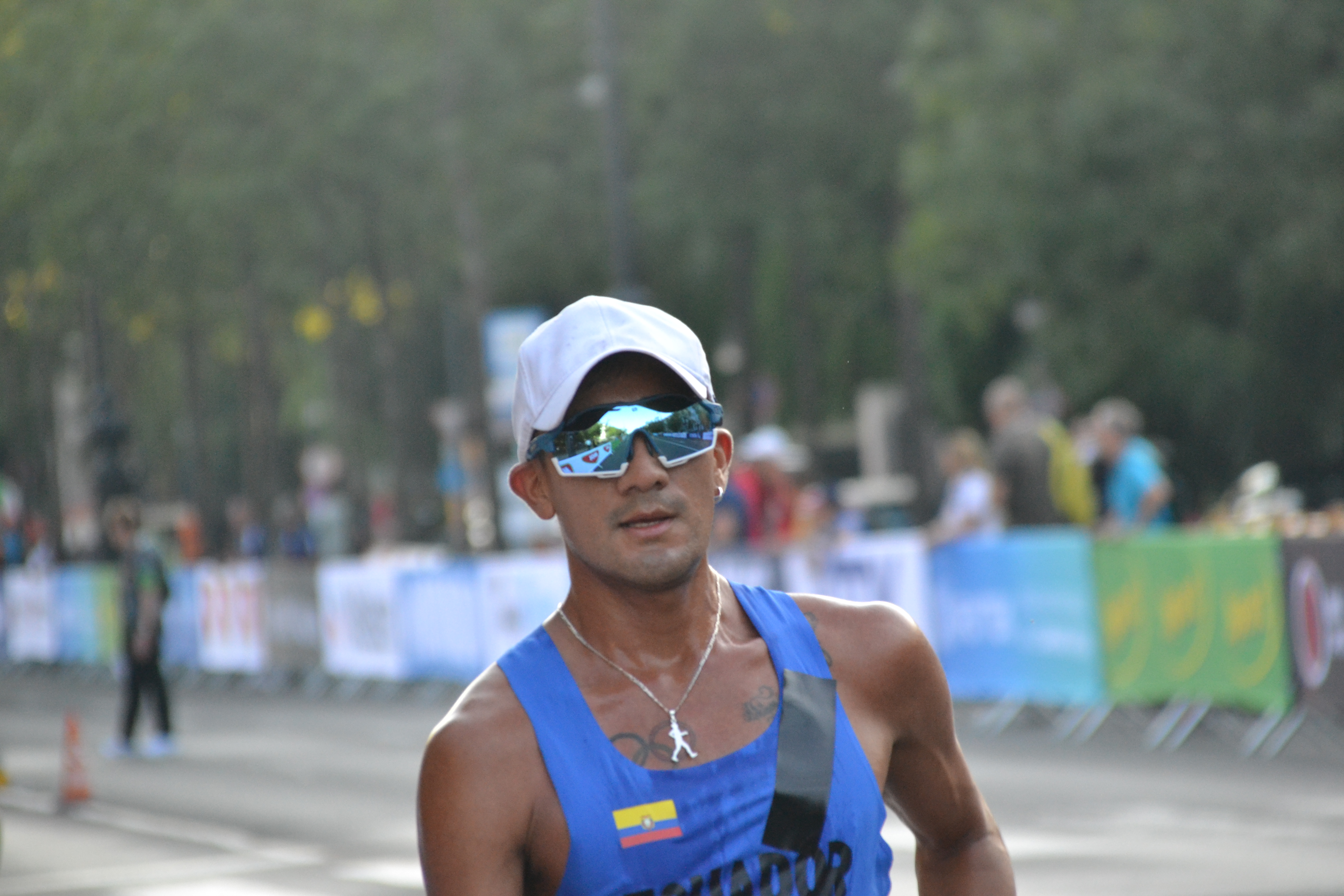
- Pintado at the 2023 World Championships

Personal information
- Full name: Brian Daniel Pintado Álvarez
- Born: 29 July 1995 (age 30) Cuenca, Ecuador
- Height: 168 cm (5 ft 6 in)
- Weight: 57 kg (126 lb)

Sport
- Sport: Athletics
- Event: Racewalking
Medal record
Men's athletics
Representing Ecuador
Olympic Games
Gold medal – first place	2024 Paris	20 km walk
Silver medal – second place	2024 Paris	Marathon walk relay
World Championships
Silver medal – second place	2023 Budapest	35 km walk
World Team Championships
Gold medal – first place	2022 Muscat	20 km walk (team)
Bronze medal – third place	2016 Rome	20 km walk (team)
Pan American Games
Gold medal – first place	2019 Lima	20 km walk
Gold medal – first place	2023 Santiago	Marathon walk relay
South American Games
Gold medal – first place	2018 Cochabamba	20 km walk
Gold medal – first place	2022 Asunción	20 km walk
South American Race Walking Championships
Silver medal – second place	2020 Lima	20 km walk
Bronze medal – third place	2018 Sucúa	20 km walk
Pan American U20 Championships
Silver medal – second place	2013 Medellín	10,000 m walk

Brian Daniel Pintado Álvarez (born 29 July 1995 in Cuenca) is an Ecuadorian racewalker, two-time Pan American Games champion and two-time Olympic Medallist.

== Biography ==
Pintado was born on 29 July 1995 in Cuenca to Fausto Pintado and Eulalia Álvarez. He was a sporty child, playing football and distance running. He made the switch to race walking at 11 years old and went on to win the 2008 South American School Games.

His debut as an adult was in 2013 at the Grande Prémio Internacional de Rio Maior em Marcha Atlética in Rio Maior, Portugal. He finished 10th in the 20km race walk.

He is married to Karen Palaguachi and has a son, Daniel Nicolas (born 2014) and a daughter, Montserrath (born 2020). His brother-in-law, Claudio Villanueva is also a race walker, who won the 2019 Pan American Games 50km race walk.

== Rio 2016 ==
He competed in the men's 20 km walk at the 2016 Summer Olympics, finishing in 37th place with a time of 1:23:44.

== Tokyo 2020 ==
He represented Ecuador again at the 2020 Summer Olympics in Tokio finishing 12th at the Men's 20km Race Walk with a time of 1:22:54.-2

== Paris 2024 ==
On 6 June 2024, the Ecuadorian National Olympic Committee named Pintado and weightlifter Neisi Dajomes as the official flag bearers for the Paris 2024 Olympic Games. He trained with Andrés Chocho in Cuenca for the Olympics and abroad since April 2024.

He won the gold medal in the men's 20 kilometres walk at the 2024 Summer Olympics with a time of 1:18:55, only 9 seconds behind the Olympic record established in the 2012 Summer Olympics by Chen Ding. He became the second Ecuadorian athlete to win gold in this race after Jefferson Pérez at the 1996 Summer Olympics.

He won the silver medal at the Marathon Race Walk Relay Mixed at the 2024 Summer Olympics together with Glenda Morejón.
