= Glenda Morejón =

Ecuadorian racewalker (born 2000)

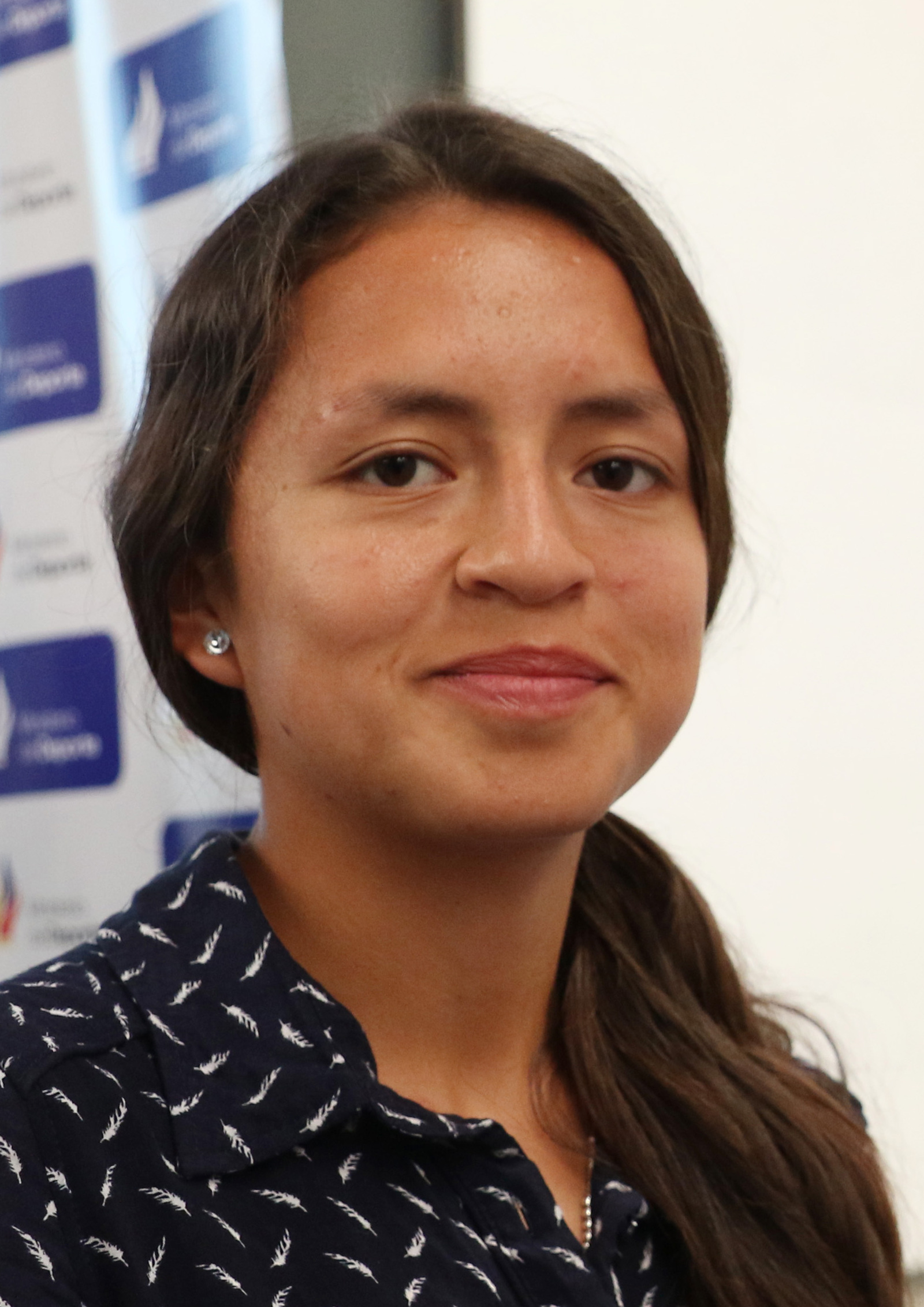
- Morejón in 2017

Personal information
- Full name: Glenda Estefanía Morejón Quiñónez
- Born: 30 May 2000 (age 26) Ibarra, Ecuador

Sport
- Country: Ecuador
- Sport: Athletics
Medal record
Women's athletics
Representing Ecuador
Olympic Games
Silver medal – second place	2024 Paris	Marathon walk relay
World Team Championships
Gold medal – first place	2022 Muscat	35 km walk
Gold medal – first place	2022 Muscat	35 km walk (team)
Pan American Games
Gold medal – first place	2023 Santiago	Marathon walk relay
Silver medal – second place	2023 Santiago	20 km walk
Pan American Championships
Silver medal – second place	2026 Medellín	Half marathon walk
Ibero-American Championships
Bronze medal – third place	2018 Lima	10,000 m walk
South American Games
Gold medal – first place	2022 Asunción	20 km walk
South American Championships
Gold medal – first place	2021 Guayaquil	20,000 m walk
South American Race Walking Championships
Gold medal – first place	2022 Lima	20 km walk
World U20 Championships
Bronze medal – third place	2018 Tampere	10,000 m walk
World Team Championships (U20)
Silver medal – second place	2018 Taicang	10 km walk
Silver medal – second place	2018 Taicang	10 km walk (team)
World U18 Championships
Gold medal – first place	2017 Nairobi	5,000 m walk
Junior Pan American Games
Gold medal – first place	2021 Cali-Valle	20,000 m walk
Pan American U20 Championships
Gold medal – first place	2019 San José	10,000 m walk
South American U23 Championships
Gold medal – first place	2021 Guayaquil	20,000 m walk

Glenda Estefanía Morejón Quiñónez (Note: In this Spanish name, the first or paternal surname is Morejón and the second or maternal family name is Quiñónez.) (born 30 May 2000) is an Ecuadorian racewalker. On 27 July 2017, she won the 5000m category of the World U18 Championships, becoming the second female Ecuadorian athlete to do so.

== Biography ==
Morejón was born on 30 May 2000 in Ibarra, Ecuador. She was educated in Ibarra at the Tarquino Jaramillo School.

Morejón comes from a family of medium-low social status, her father Luis Morejón is a professional, in addition to helping with domestic chores, her mother María del Carmen Quiñónez works in the 24 de Mayo market in the city of Otavalo and her sister María Belén, who follows in her footsteps is a walker. At the age of thirteen, Morejón began to practice in the field of Olympic walks, along with the help of her coach Giovan Delgado a Guayaquil graduated in Physical Culture who works in the Educational Unit Ibarra and who lives in Ibarra since 1988, which also founded the Tarquino Jaramillo Athletic School in 2001, where she trains along with 24 other athletes.

With respect to her university education, the Universidad Técnica Particular de Loja (UTPL) has awarded Morejón a sports scholarship that covers 70% of her first cycle tuition and will cover 90% of the total cost of tuition in all cycles of her Business Administration career in open and distance modality.

She won the World U18 Championships in the 5,000 meters (16,000 ft) category on 15 July 2017 at the Nyayo National Stadium in Nairobi, in the face of doubts of her ability because of inexperience and young age. She won with a time of 22:32:30, ahead of athletes Meryem Bekmez (Turkey) and Elvira Khasanova (Russia). Morejón is the second Ecuador athlete to win in the World Under 18 Champions, the first of which being Maribel Caicedo in 2015.

Despite her record of winning acclaim for Latin America, Morejón has had difficulty securing funding for her training or equipment. She trained with patched and holed shoes, drank tap water, and used aguapanela as an energizer. Despite a local campaign by Morejón's management, she had to go alone to Nairobi and with basic equipment. Ecuador's Ministry of Sport has denied funding for Morejón despite international protest.

On 5 May 2018, she won the silver medal in the World Championship held in Taicang, China.

On 8 June 2019, at a meet in La Coruña, Spain, Morejón produced what World Athletics described as one of the deepest 20 km race walk fields in history, finishing in 1:25:29 to defeat that year's reigning world champion, China's Yang Jiayu, by five seconds, in what was her debut at the distance. The performance was, at the time, the fastest ever recorded by an under-20 athlete and ranked 13th on the senior world all-time list. The mark remained the South American area record as of the 2025 World Athletics Championships, six years later.

That August, competing at the 2019 World Athletics Championships in Doha, Morejón finished 25th in the women's 20 km walk after fading in the second half of the race in difficult heat conditions. Reflecting on the result afterward, she said: "I was disappointed with my performance in Doha because I didn't reach my target of walking as fast as I wanted to. But it's part of sport and it's a learning experience." She was among the nominees for that year's World Athletics Rising Star Award.

== Tokyo 2020 ==
Although she has won four international contests, she was as considered a substitute athlete for the 2020 Tokyo. However, in 2019, Morejón was promoted to the High Performance Plan, the Olympic competitor program from the Sport Secretary in Ecuador. She participated in the Women's 20 kilometres walk but didn't finish.

Morojón then trained for the Olympic games in Paris 2024 along with other Ecuadorian athletes, such as Alex Quiñonez, Neisi Dájomes, etc.

== Paris 2024 ==
She finished 6th in the Women's 20km Race Walk and went on to earn a silver medal together with Brian Pintado at the Marathon Race Walk Relay Mixed at the 2024 Summer Olympics.

== Sports career ==
On 28 June 2026, Morejón won the silver medal in the inaugural half marathon walk at the 2026 Pan American Championships in Athletics in Medellín, Colombia, finishing in 1:35:44, one place and ten seconds behind Peru's Evelyn Inga and ahead of Mexico's Alejandra Ortega.

Personal Records
Discipline	Performance	Location	Date	Records	Results Score
5000 Metres (Race Walk)	22:25.16	Cuenca (ECU)	26 August 2017	N/A	1045
5 kilometres (Race Walk)	21:16	Sucúa (ECU)	15 April 2017	ABP, AJB	1127
10,000 Metres (Race Walk)	44:12.75	Trujillo (PER)	25 August 2018	AJB, NR	1115
10 Kilometres (Race Walk)	43:04	Sucúa (ECU)	9 March 2019	ABP, AJR	1156
20 Kilometres (Race Walk)	1:25.29	La Coruña (ESP)	9 June 2019	WJB, AR, AJB, NR	1218
35 Kilometres (Race Walk)	2:48:33	(location unspecified)	5 March 2022		1158
Half Marathon (Race Walk)	1:35:44	Medellín (COL)	28 June 2026		1136

World Rankings
Current World Ranking Positions
Women's 20 km (Race Walking)	PLACE 23	SCORE 1155
Women's Overall Ranking	PLACE 1078	SCORE 1155
Highest Ever World Ranking Positions
Women's 20 km (Race Walking)	PLACE 23	SCORE for 3 weeks
Women's Overall Ranking	PLACE 1078	SCORE for 1 week
