= Johana Ordóñez =

Ecuadorian race walker

Personal information
- Full name: Johana Edelmira Ordóñez Lucero
- Nationality: Ecuador
- Born: 12 December 1987 (age 38) Guayaquil, Ecuador
- Height: 1.66 m (5 ft 5 1/2 in)
- Weight: 52 kg (115 lb)

Sport
- Country: Ecuador
- Sport: Athletics
- Event: Race walking
- Club: Federación Deportiva del Azuay
- Coached by: Luis Chocho
Medal record
Representing Ecuador
Women's athletics
World Team Championships
Gold medal – first place	2022 Muscat	35 km walk (team)
Gold medal – first place	2026 Brasília	Marathon walk (team)
Silver medal – second place	2018 Taicang	50 km walk (team)
Pan American Games
Gold medal – first place	2019 Lima	50 km walk
Pan American Cup
Silver medal – second place	2019 Lázaro Cárdenas	50 km walk
Silver medal – second place	2025 Anapoima	35 km walk
South American Championships
Bronze medal – third place	2017 Asunción	20,000 m walk
South American Race Walking Championships
Silver medal – second place	2018 Sucúa	50 km walk
Bronze medal – third place	2022 Lima	35 km walk
Bolivarian Games
Gold medal – first place	2009 Sucre	20 km walk
South American U23 Championships
Gold medal – first place	2008 Lima	20,000 m walk

Johana Edelmira Ordóñez Lucero (born 12 December 1987) is an Ecuadorian race walker.

== Career ==
She represented Ecuador at the 2008 Summer Olympics in Beijing, and competed for the women's 20 km race walk. Despite the tumultuous weather, Ordóñez finished and completed the race in thirty-fifth place, with a time of 1:36:26.

== Achievements ==
Year	Competition	Venue	Position	Event	Notes
Representing Ecuador
2001	South American Race Walking Cup - Youth (U-18)	Cuenca, Ecuador	3rd	5 km walk	27:11 min
2002	South American Race Walking Cup - Youth (U-18)	Puerto Saavedra, Chile	3rd	5 km walk	25:21 min
2002	South American Junior Championships / South American Games	Belém, Brazil	4th	10,000m walk	57:09.83
2002	South American Youth Championships	Asunción, Paraguay	2nd	5000 m track walk	25:12.72 min
2004	South American Race Walking Championships - Junior (U-20)	Los Ángeles, Chile	2nd	10 km walk	49:30 min
2004	World Junior Championships	Grosseto, Italy	16th	10,000m walk	50:05.95
2004	South American Youth Championships	Guayaquil, Ecuador	1st	5000 m track walk	24:36.6 min
2008	South American Race Walking Championships	Cuenca, Ecuador	2nd	20 km walk	1:39:27 hrs
2008	South American U23 Championships	Lima, Peru	1st	20,000m walk	1:40:22
