= Peru at the 2025 World Athletics Championships =

- Flag of Peru
- WA code: PER

in Tokyo, Japan 13 September 2025 – 21 September 2025
- Competitors: 10 (3 men and 7 women)
- Medals: Gold 0 Silver 0 Bronze 0 Total 0

World Athletics Championships appearances
- 1983; 1987; 1991; 1993; 1995; 1997; 1999; 2001; 2003; 2005; 2007; 2009; 2011; 2013; 2015; 2017; 2019; 2022; 2023; 2025

Peru competed at the 2025 World Athletics Championships in Tokyo, Japan, from 13 to 21 September 2025.

== Results ==
Peru entered 3 male and 7 female athletes to the championships.

Key

- Q = Qualified for the next round
- q = Qualified for the next round as a fastest loser or, in field events, by position without achieving the qualifying target
- NR = National record
- PB = Personal best
- SB = Season best
- N/A = Round not applicable for the event

=== Men ===
Track and road events

Athlete	Event	Final	
Athlete	Event	Result	Rank
Ferdinand Cereceda	Marathon	2:23:46 SB	56
Rene Champi	Marathon	DNF	
Luis Henry Campos	20 kilometres walk	DQ	

=== Women ===
Track and road events

Athlete	Event	Final	
Athlete	Event	Result	Rank
Sheyla Eulogio	Marathon	2:33:42	21
Aydee Loayza	Marathon	2:48:00	51
Zaida Ramos	Marathon	DNF	
Mary Luz Andía	20 kilometres walk	1:28:52	10
Kimberly García	20 kilometres walk	1:26:22 NR	5
Evelyn Inga	20 kilometres walk	1:33:29	30
Mary Luz Andía	35 kilometres walk	DNF	
Brigitte Coaquira Albarracin	35 kilometres walk	3:13:22	31
Kimberly García	35 kilometres walk	2:50:37	10
