= Peru at the 2022 World Athletics Championships =

- Flag of Peru
- WA code: PER
- National federation: Peruvian Athletics Sport Federation
- Website: fedepeatle.org

in Eugene, United States July 15, 2022 – July 24, 2022
- Competitors: 8 (3 men and 5 women) in 6 events
- Medals Ranked 7th: Gold 2 Silver 0 Bronze 0 Total 2

World Athletics Championships appearances
- 1983; 1987; 1991; 1993; 1995; 1997; 1999; 2001; 2003; 2005; 2007; 2009; 2011; 2013; 2015; 2017; 2019; 2022; 2023; 2025

Peru competed at the 2022 World Athletics Championships in Eugene, United States, from 15 to 24 July 2022. The Peruvian Athletics Sport Federation had initially entered 8 athletes, but ended up competing with 6 of them due to the withdrawals of Jovana de la Cruz and Soledad Torre.

On 15 July 2022, racewalker Kimberly García won the women's 20km race walk, which meant the first world gold medal and the first ever world medal of any kind for Peru at the World Athletics Championships. Seven days later, García won the second gold medal for Peru after winning the women's 35km race walk, an event that made its debut in the World Athletics Championships.

With 2 gold medals, Peru finished its participation in 7th place in the medal table, and was 26th place in the overall placing table with a total of 16 points.

== Medalists ==
Medal	Athlete	Event	Date
Gold	Kimberly García	Women's 20 kilometres walk	15 July
Gold	Kimberly García	Women's 35 kilometres walk	22 July

== Team ==
On 7 July 2022, the Peruvian Athletics Sport Federation (FDPA) named a team conformed by 11 athletes qualified for the World Athletics Championships, the largest number of athletes that Peru had ever qualified. However, the final entry list published by World Athletics consigned 8 athletes for Peru, with Gladys Tejeda (marathon), Mariluz Andía and Leyde Guerra (both in 20 kilometres walk) being ruled out due to sporting reasons and injuries respectively.

Eventually, Jovana de la Cruz and Soledad Torre (both in marathon) withdrew from the competition due to sporting reasons and physical discomforts respectively, reducing the Peruvian team to 6 athletes.

== Results ==
Peru entered 8 athletes.

Key

- Q = Qualified for the next round
- q = Qualified for the next round as a fastest loser or, in field events, by position without achieving the qualifying target
- NR = National record
- PB = Personal best
- SB = Season best
- N/A = Round not applicable for the event

=== Men ===
Road events

Athlete	Event	Final	
Athlete	Event	Result	Rank
Luis Henry Campos	20 kilometres walk	1:34:02	41
Luis Henry Campos	35 kilometres walk	DNF	
César Rodríguez	20 kilometres walk	1:20:59	10
César Rodríguez	35 kilometres walk	2:29:24 NR	16

Field events

Athlete	Event	Qualification		Final	
Athlete	Event	Distance	Position	Distance	Position
José Luis Mandros	Long jump	7.71	25	Did not advance	

=== Women ===
Road events

Athlete	Event	Final	
Athlete	Event	Result	Rank
Kimberly García	20 kilometres walk	1:26:58 NR	1st place, gold medalist(s)
Kimberly García	35 kilometres walk	2:39:16 CR, AR, NR	1st place, gold medalist(s)
Evelyn Inga	20 kilometres walk	1:38:23 SB	31
Evelyn Inga	35 kilometres walk	2:56:04	18
Aydee Huamán	Marathon	3:04:16 SB	32
Jovana de la Cruz	Marathon	Withdrew from the competition	
Soledad Torre	Marathon	Withdrew from the competition	
