= 2011 World Youth Championships in Athletics – Girls' 5000 metres walk =

Girls' 5000 metres walk at the 2011 World Youth Championships in Athletics
- Venue: Stadium Lille Métropole
- Dates: 8 July
- Competitors: 27
- Winning time: 21:45.59 WYL

Medalists
gold medal	Kate Veale	Ireland
silver medal	Mao Yanxue	China
bronze medal	Nadezhda Leontyeva	Russia

The girls' 5000 metres walk at the 2011 World Youth Championships in Athletics was held at the Stadium Lille Métropole on 8 July.

== Medalists ==
Gold	Silver	Bronze
Kate Veale; Ireland	Mao Yanxue; China	Nadezhda Leontyeva; Russia

== Records ==
Prior to the competition, the following records were as follows.

World Youth Best	Tatyana Kalmykova (RUS)	20:28.05	Ostrava, Czech Republic	12 July 2007
Championship Record	Tatyana Kalmykova (RUS)	20:28.05	Ostrava, Czech Republic	12 July 2007
World Youth Leading	Yuli Capcha (PER)	21:53.8	Lima, Peru	14 May 2011

== Final ==
Rank	Name	Nationality	Time	Notes
1st place, gold medalist(s)	Kate Veale	Ireland	21:45.59	WYL
2nd place, silver medalist(s)	Mao Yanxue	China	22:00.15	PB
3rd place, bronze medalist(s)	Nadezhda Leontyeva	Russia	22:00.84	PB
4	Alina Galchenko	Ukraine	22:12.47	PB
5	Alejandra Ortega	Mexico	22:17.85	PB
6	Anežka Drahotová	Czech Republic	22:32.87	PB
7	Ni Yuanyuan	China	22:36.62	PB
8	Anna Clemente	Italy	22:47.32	SB
9	Olga Nacharkina	Russia	22:52.40	
10	Nozomi Okazaki	Japan	23:11.00	
11	Eliška Drahotová	Czech Republic	23:23.10	PB
12	Makoto Yamanaka	Japan	23:25.77	
13	Ana Daza	Colombia	23:28.91	PB
14	Nikola Piliarová	Slovakia	23:35.33	PB
15	Jessica Pickles	Australia	24:01.42	
16	Natalia Alfonzo	Venezuela	24:19.41	PB
17	Elysle Albino	Brazil	24:20.53	
18	Mercédesz Marton	Hungary	24:27.17	PB
19	Alessia Costantino	Italy	24:30.73	PB
20	Askale Tiksa	Ethiopia	24:43.11	PB
21	Mihaela Pușcașu	Romania	24:44.51	PB
22	Amanda Cano	Spain	24:47.19	
23	Madison Loriou	France	25:41.84	
24	Askal Hailaye	Ethiopia	27:36.45	PB
	Amy Burren	Australia	DNF	
	Yuli Capcha	Peru	DNF	
	Gamze Özgör	Turkey	DNF	
