= 2012 World Junior Championships in Athletics – Women's 10,000 metres walk =

The women's 10,000 metres race walk at the 2012 World Junior Championships in Athletics was held at the Estadi Olímpic Lluís Companys on 11 July.

== Medalists ==
Gold	Silver	Bronze
Ekaterina Medvedeva; Russia	Nadezhda Leontyeva; Russia	Sandra Arenas; Columbia

== Records ==
Prior to the competition, the existing world junior and championship records were as follows.

World Junior Record	Elena Lashmanova (RUS)	42:59.48	Tallinn, Estonia	21 July 2011
Championship Record	Tatyana Mineyeva (RUS)	43:24.72	Bydgoszcz, Poland	9 July 2008
World Junior Leading	Ekaterina Medvedeva (RUS)	44:30.49	Moscow, Russia	10 June 2012

== Results ==
Rank	Name	Nationality	Time	Note
1st place, gold medalist(s)	Ekaterina Medvedeva	Russia	45:41.74	
2nd place, silver medalist(s)	Nadezhda Leontyeva	Russia	45:43.64	PB
3rd place, bronze medalist(s)	Sandra Arenas	Colombia	45:44.46	NU20R
4	Liudmyla Olianovska	Ukraine	45:53.50	PB
5	Yanxue Mao	China	46:10.60	PB
6	Anežka Drahotová	Czech Republic	46:29.95	PB
7	Alejandra Ortega	Mexico	47:03.42	PB
8	Nozomi Yagi	Japan	47:04.92	PB
9	Ángela Castro	Bolivia	47:09.62	PB
10	Kimberly García	Peru	47:42.49	SB
11	Alina Halchenko	Ukraine	47:49.92	
12	Katarina Strmenová	Slovakia	47:54.60	PB
13	Wendy Cornejo	Bolivia	48:00.03	SB
14	Eliška Drahotová	Czech Republic	48:15.34	PB
15	Anna Clemente	Italy	48:22.25	PB
16	Dandan Duan	China	48:39.21	PB
17	Lee Jeong-eun	South Korea	48:40.61	PB
18	Kate Veale	Ireland	48:50.20	PB
19	Elena Poli	Italy	49:11.12	
20	Emilie Tissot	France	49:13.95	PB
21	Amanda Cano	Spain	49:18.27	
22	Rachel Tallent	Australia	49:55.81	
23	Sae Matsumoto	Japan	49:56.66	
24	Laura García-Caro	Spain	50:13.77	PB
25	Yanelli Caballero	Mexico	50:29.85	
26	Gamze Özgör	Turkey	50:53.64	PB
27	Filipa Ferreira	Portugal	50:59.00	
28	Coralie Mellado	France	51:14.84	SB
29	Elif Koc	Turkey	51:44.86	PB
30	Shahinaz Al-Nasri	Tunisia	51:53.22	
31	Emma Prendiville	Ireland	52:41.51	PB
32	Bariza Ghezelani	Algeria	53:30.36	
33	Mara Ribeiro	Portugal	53:31.29	
34	Erika Parviainen	Finland	53:56.98	PB
–	Jessica Pickles	Australia	–	DSQ
–	Khushbir Kaur	India	–	DSQ
–	Viktoryia Rashchupkina	Belarus	–	DNF
–	Alexandra Iuliana Aichimoaei	Romania	–	DNF

== Participation ==
According to an unofficial count, 38 athletes from 24 countries participated in the event.

- Algeria (1)
- Australia (2)
- Belarus (1)
- Bolivia (2)
- China (2)
- Colombia (1)
- Czech Republic (2)
- Finland (1)
- France (2)
- India (1)
- Ireland (2)
- Italy (2)
- Japan (2)
- Mexico (2)
- Peru (1)
- Portugal (2)
- Romania (1)
- Russia (2)
- Slovakia (1)
- South Korea (1)
- Spain (2)
- Tunisia (1)
- Turkey (2)
- Ukraine (2)
