= Peru at the 2017 World Championships in Athletics =

- Flag of Peru
- WA code: PER
- National federation: Peruvian Athletics Sport Federation
- Website: fedepeatle.org (in Spanish)

in London, United Kingdom 4–13 August 2017
- Competitors: 7 (4 men and 3 women) in 5 events
- Medals: Gold 0 Silver 0 Bronze 0 Total 0

World Championships in Athletics appearances
- 1983; 1987; 1991; 1993; 1995; 1997; 1999; 2001; 2003; 2005; 2007; 2009; 2011; 2013; 2015; 2017; 2019; 2022; 2023; 2025

Peru competed at the 2017 World Championships in Athletics in London, United Kingdom, from 4–13 August 2017.

== Results ==
=== Men ===
Track and road events

Athlete	Event	Heat		Semifinal		Final	
Athlete	Event	Result	Rank	Result	Rank	Result	Rank
David Torrence	1500 metres	3:46.39	32	Did not advance			
Jean-Pierre Castro	Marathon	—N/a				DNF	–
Raúl Machacuay	Marathon	—N/a				DNF	–
César Rodríguez	20 kilometres walk	—N/a				1:23:05 PB	33

=== Women ===
Track and road events

Athlete	Event	Final	
Athlete	Event	Result	Rank
Wilma Arizapana	Marathon	2:43:13	48
Inés Melchor	Marathon	2:35:34	26
Kimberly García	20 kilometres walk	1:29:13 NR	7
