= Peru at the 2023 World Athletics Championships =

- Flag of Peru
- WA code: PER

in Budapest, Hungary 19 August 2023 – 27 August 2023
- Competitors: 12 (5 men and 7 women)
- Medals Ranked 27th: Gold 0 Silver 1 Bronze 0 Total 1

World Athletics Championships appearances
- 1983; 1987; 1991; 1993; 1995; 1997; 1999; 2001; 2003; 2005; 2007; 2009; 2011; 2013; 2015; 2017; 2019; 2022; 2023

Peru competed at the 2023 World Athletics Championships in Budapest, Hungary, from 19 to 27 August 2023.

== Medalists ==
Medal	Athlete	Event	Date
Silver	Kimberly García	Women's 35 kilometres walk	August 24

== Results ==
Peru entered 12 athletes.

Key

- Q = Qualified for the next round
- q = Qualified for the next round as a fastest loser or, in field events, by position without achieving the qualifying target
- NR = National record
- PB = Personal best
- SB = Season best
- N/A = Round not applicable for the event

=== Men ===
Track and road events

Athlete	Event	Final	
Athlete	Event	Result	Rank
Nelson Ito Ccuro	Marathon	2:20:00	46
Luis Ostos	Marathon	2:25:50	57
Luis Henry Campos	20 kilometres walk	1:20:56 PB	22
Luis Henry Campos	35 kilometres walk	DNS	
César Rodríguez	20 kilometres walk	1:19:52 NR	17
César Rodríguez	35 kilometres walk	DNS	

Field events

Athlete	Event	Qualification		Final	
Athlete	Event	Distance	Position	Distance	Position
José Luis Mandros	Long jump	7.53	30	Did not advance	

=== Women ===
Track and road events

Athlete	Event	Final	
Athlete	Event	Result	Rank
Luz Mery Rojas	10,000 metres	33:19.61	19
Nicolasa Condori	Marathon	2:42:25	53
Aydee Loayza Huaman	Marathon	2:45:40	62
Zaida Ramos	Marathon	2:36:23	35
Mary Luz Andía	20 kilometres walk	1:35:38 SB	31
Kimberly García	20 kilometres walk	1:27:32	4
Kimberly García	35 kilometres walk	2:40:52	2nd place, silver medalist(s)
Evelyn Inga	20 kilometres walk	DQ	
Evelyn Inga	35 kilometres walk	2:46:18 PB	6
