= Athletics at the 2019 Summer Universiade – Women's 20 kilometres walk =

Athletics competition event

The women's 20 kilometres walk event at the 2019 Summer Universiade was held on 12 July in Naples.

== Results ==
=== Individual ===
Official Video

Rank	Name	Nationality	Time	Notes
1st place, gold medalist(s)	Katie Hayward	Australia	1:33:30	
2nd place, silver medalist(s)	Jemima Montag	Australia	1:33:57	
3rd place, bronze medalist(s)	Wang Na	China	1:37:33	
4	Liu Yu	China	1:38:17	
5	Olena Sobchuk	Ukraine	1:38:40	
6	Mariia Filiuk	Ukraine	1:38:48	
7	Katarzyna Zdziebło	Poland	1:38:56	
8	Valentyna Myronchuk	Ukraine	1:40:34	
9	Nadia González	Mexico	1:40:37	
10	Anastasiya Rarouskaya	Belarus	1:40:57	
11	Monika Vaiciukevičiūtė	Lithuania	1:41:28	
12	Sara Vitiello	Italy	1:42:17	
13	Anastasiya Rodzkina	Belarus	1:42:37	
14	Su Wenxiu	China	1:44:03	
15	Philippa Huse	Australia	1:44:09	
16	Ravina	India	1:46:08	
17	Joana Pontes	Portugal	1:47:10	
18	Katsiaryna Hniadzko	Belarus	1:47:53	
19	Sonal Sukhwal	India	1:50:14	
20	Kate Veale	Ireland	1:54:38	
	Maria Vittoria Becchetti	Italy	DNF	
	Tiia Kuikka	Finland	DNF	
	Monika Horňáková	Slovakia	DNF	
	Anežka Drahotová	Czech Republic	DQ	

=== Team ===
Rank	Team	Time	Notes
1st place, gold medalist(s)	Australia; Katie Hayward; Jemima Montag; Philippa Huse	4:51:36	
2nd place, silver medalist(s)	Ukraine; Olena Sobchuk; Mariia Filiuk; Valentyna Myronchuk	4:58:02	
3rd place, bronze medalist(s)	China; Wang Na; Liu Yu; Su Wenxiu	4:59:53	
4	Belarus; Anastasiya Rarouskaya; Anastasiya Rodzkina; Katsiaryna Hniadzko	5:11:27	
