= Athletics at the 2020 Summer Olympics – Women's 20 kilometres walk =

Women's 20 kilometres walk at the Games of the XXXII Olympiad
- Olympic Athletics
- Venue: Sapporo
- Date: 6 August 2021
- Competitors: 58 from 30 nations
- Winning time: 1:29.12

Medalists
| 1st place, gold medalist(s) | | Antonella Palmisano | Italy |
| 2nd place, silver medalist(s) | | Sandra Arenas | Colombia |
| 3rd place, bronze medalist(s) | | Liu Hong | China |

The women's 20 kilometres walk event at the 2020 Summer Olympics took place on 6 August 2021 in Sapporo. Approximately 60 athletes has qualified; the exact number depended on how many nations use universality places to enter athletes in addition to the number qualifying through time (one universality place was used in 2016). The actual number of participants was 58 walkers, and the winner was Antonella Palmisano of Italy.

== Background ==
This was the 6th appearance of the event, having appeared at every Olympics since 2000.

== Qualification ==
A National Olympic Committee (NOC) could enter up to 3 qualified athletes in the women's 20 kilometres walk if all athletes meet the entry standard or qualify by ranking during the qualifying period. (The limit of 3 has been in place since the 1930 Olympic Congress.) The qualifying standard was 1:31:00. This standard was "set for the sole purpose of qualifying athletes with exceptional performances unable to qualify through the IAAF World Rankings pathway." The world rankings, based on the average of the best five results for the athlete over the qualifying period and weighted by the importance of the meet, was then used to qualify athletes until the cap of 60 is reached.

The qualifying period was originally from 1 January 2019 to 31 May 2020. Due to the COVID-19 pandemic, the period was suspended from 6 April 2020 to 30 November 2020, with the end date extended to 29 June 2021. The most recent Area Championships was available to be counted in the ranking, even if not during the qualifying period. In July 2020, World Athletics announced that the suspension period would be lifted for the road events (marathons and race walks) on 1 September 2020.

NOCs were able to use also their universality place—each NOC can enter one female athlete regardless of time if they had no female athletes meeting the entry standard for an athletics event—in the 20 kilometres walk.

=== Women's 20 km walk ===
| Qualification standard | No. of athletes | NOC | Nominated athletes |
|---|---|---|---|
| Entry standard – 1:31:00 | 3 | China | Liu Hong; Qieyang Shijie; Yang Jiayu |
| Entry standard – 1:31:00 | 3 | Ecuador | Karla Jaramillo; Glenda Morejón; Paola Pérez |
| Entry standard – 1:31:00 | 3 | Italy | Eleonora Giorgi; Antonella Palmisano; Valentina Trapletti |
| Entry standard – 1:31:00 | 3 | Mexico | Alegna González; Ilse Guerrero; Valeria Ortuño |
| Entry standard – 1:31:00 | 3 | Spain | Laura García-Caro; Raquel González; María Pérez |
| Entry standard – 1:31:00 | 3 | Ukraine | Lyudmila Olyanovska; Mariia Sakharuk; Hanna Shevchuk |
| Entry standard – 1:31:00 | 2 | Australia | Katie Hayward; Jemima Montag |
| Entry standard – 1:31:00 | 2 | Belarus | Viktoryia Rashchupkina; Anna Terlyukevich |
| Entry standard – 1:31:00 | 2 | Colombia | Sandra Arenas; Sandra Galvis |
| Entry standard – 1:31:00 | 2 | Guatemala | Mayra Herrera; Mirna Ortiz |
| Entry standard – 1:31:00 | 2 | India | Priyanka Goswami; Bhawna Jat |
| Entry standard – 1:31:00 | 2 | Japan | Nanako Fujii; Kumiko Okada |
| Entry standard – 1:31:00 | 1 | Lithuania | ~~Živilė Vaiciukevičiūtė~~; Brigita Virbalytė |
| Entry standard – 1:31:00 | 2 | Peru | Mary Luz Andía; Kimberly García |
| Entry standard – 1:31:00 | 2 | Turkey | Meryem Bekmez; Ayşe Tekdal |
| Entry standard – 1:31:00 | 1 | Brazil | Érica de Sena |
| Entry standard – 1:31:00 | 1 | Costa Rica | Noelia Vargas |
| Entry standard – 1:31:00 | 1 | Czech Republic | Tereza Ďurdiaková |
| Entry standard – 1:31:00 | 1 | Germany | Saskia Feige |
| Entry standard – 1:31:00 | 1 | Greece | Antigoni Drisbioti |
| Entry standard – 1:31:00 | 1 | Kazakhstan | Ayman Ratova |
| Entry standard – 1:31:00 | 0 | Kenya | ~~Emily Wamusyi Ngii~~ |
| Entry standard – 1:31:00 | 1 | Poland | Katarzyna Zdziebło |
| Entry standard – 1:31:00 | 1 | Portugal | Ana Cabecinha |
| Entry standard – 1:31:00 | 1 | ROC | Elvira Khasanova |
| World ranking | 2 | Greece | Kiriaki Filtisakou; Panagiota Tsinopoulou |
| World ranking | 2 | Hungary | Barbara Kovács; Viktória Madarász |
| World ranking | 1 | Australia | Rebecca Henderson |
| World ranking | 1 | Belarus | Anastasiya Rarouskaya |
| World ranking | 1 | Bolivia | Ángela Castro |
| World ranking | 1 | Colombia | Yeseida Carrillo |
| World ranking | 1 | Czech Republic | Anežka Drahotová |
| World ranking | 1 | Ethiopia | Yehualeye Beletew |
| World ranking | 1 | Hong Kong | Ching Siu Nga |
| World ranking | 1 | Japan | Kaori Kawazoe |
| World ranking | 1 | Peru | Leydi Guerra |
| World ranking | 1 | Slovakia | Mária Czaková |
| World ranking | 1 | Turkey | Evin Demir |
| World ranking | 1 | United States | Robyn Stevens |
| Total | 60 | | |

== Competition format and course ==
The event consists of a single race.

== Records ==
Prior to this competition, the existing world, Olympic, and area records were as follows.

| World record | Yang Jiayu (CHN) | 1:23:49 | Huangshan, China | 20 March 2021 |
| Olympic record | Qieyang Shijie (CHN) | 1:25:16 | London, United Kingdom | 11 August 2012 |

| Area | Time | Athlete | Nation |
|---|---|---|---|
| Africa (records) | 1:30:43 | Grace Wanjiru Njue | Kenya |
| Asia (records) | 1:23:49 WR | Yang Jiayu | China |
| Europe (records) | 1:25:02 | Elena Lashmanova | Russia |
| North, Central America and Caribbean (records) | 1:26:17 | María Guadalupe González | Mexico |
| Oceania (records) | 1:27:44 | Jane Saville | Australia |
| South America (records) | 1:25:29 | Glenda Morejón | Ecuador |

== Schedule ==
All times are Japan Standard Time (UTC+9)

The women's 20 kilometres walk took place on a single day.

| Date | Time | Round |
|---|---|---|
| Friday, 6 August 2021 | 16:30 | Final |

== Results ==
| Key: | ~ | Loss of contact | > | Bent knee | TR 54.7.5 | Disqualified by Rule TR 54.7.5 |

| Rank | Athlete | Nation | Time | Time behind | Notes |
|---|---|---|---|---|---|
| 1st place, gold medalist(s) | Antonella Palmisano | Italy | 1:29:12 | +0.00 | |
| 2nd place, silver medalist(s) | Sandra Arenas | Colombia | 1:29:37 | +0:25 | ~~ |
| 3rd place, bronze medalist(s) | Liu Hong | China | 1:29:57 | +0:45 | ~~ |
| 4 | María Pérez | Spain | 1:30:05 | +0:53 | |
| 5 | Alegna González | Mexico | 1:30:33 | +1:21 | |
| 6 | Jemima Montag | Australia | 1:30:39 | +1:27 | ~ |
| 7 | Qieyang Shijie | China | 1:31:04 | +1:52 | |
| 8 | Antigoni Drisbioti | Greece | 1:31:24 | +2:12 | SB |
| 9 | Paola Pérez | Ecuador | 1:31:26 | +2:14 | ~~ |
| 10 | Katarzyna Zdziebło | Poland | 1:31:29 | +2:17 | |
| 11 | Érica de Sena | Brazil | 1:31:39 | +2:27 | ~~ ~ |
| 12 | Yang Jiayu | China | 1:31:54 | +2:42 | ~~ ~ |
| 13 | Nanako Fujii | Japan | 1:31:55 | +2:43 | |
| 14 | Raquel González | Spain | 1:31:57 | +2:45 | ~ |
| 15 | Kumiko Okada | Japan | 1:31:57 | +2:45 | |
| 16 | Elvira Khasanova | ROC | 1:31:58 | +2:46 | ~~ |
| 17 | Priyanka Goswami | India | 1:32:36 | +3:24 | ~ |
| 18 | Valentina Trapletti | Italy | 1:33:12 | +4:00 | |
| 19 | Mariia Sakharuk | Ukraine | 1:34:04 | +4:52 | |
| 20 | Ana Cabecinha | Portugal | 1:34:08 | +4:56 | SB |
| 21 | Noelia Vargas | Costa Rica | 1:35:07 | +5:55 | |
| 22 | Meryem Bekmez | Turkey | 1:35:08 | +5:56 | |
| 23 | Anastasiya Rarovskaya | Belarus | 1:35:09 | +5:57 | ~ |
| 24 | Mary Luz Andía | Peru | 1:35:25 | +6:13 | |
| 25 | Sandra Galvis | Colombia | 1:35:36 | +6:24 | ~~ SB |
| 26 | Brigita Virbalytė | Lithuania | 1:35:56 | +6:44 | |
| 27 | Hanna Shevchuk | Ukraine | 1:36:27 | +7:15 | ~~ |
| 28 | Karla Jaramillo | Ecuador | 1:36:32 | +7:20 | ~ |
| 29 | Kiriaki Filtisakou | Greece | 1:36:51 | +7:39 | |
| 30 | Tereza Ďurdiaková | Czech Republic | 1:36:58 | +7:46 | |
| 31 | Anna Terlyukevich | Belarus | 1:37:22 | +8:10 | ~ |
| 32 | Bhawna Jat | India | 1:37:38 | +8:26 | ~ |
| 33 | Robyn Stevens | United States | 1:37:42 | +8:30 | >~ |
| 34 | Laura García-Caro | Spain | 1:37:48 | +8:36 | ~~ ~ |
| 35 | Ching Siu Nga | Hong Kong | 1:37:53 | +8:41 | > |
| 36 | Leyde Guerra | Peru | 1:38:10 | +8:58 | ~~ |
| 37 | Katie Hayward | Australia | 1:38:11 | +8:59 | ~~ |
| 38 | Rebecca Henderson | Australia | 1:38:21 | +9:09 | ~ |
| 39 | Ayşe Tekdal | Turkey | 1:38:40 | +9:28 | |
| 40 | Kaori Kawazoe | Japan | 1:39:31 | +10:19 | |
| 41 | Evin Demir | Turkey | 1:39:55 | +10:43 | |
| 42 | Ayman Ratova | Kazakhstan | 1:40:02 | +10:50 | |
| 43 | Lyudmyla Olyanovska | Ukraine | 1:40:20 | +11:08 | |
| 44 | Mirna Ortiz | Guatemala | 1:40:23 | +11:11 | |
| 45 | Mária Czaková | Slovakia | 1:41:29 | +12:17 | >~ |
| 46 | Barbara Kovács | Hungary | 1:41:49 | +12:37 | |
| 47 | Valeria Ortuño | Mexico | 1:41:50 | +12:38 | ~~ |
| 48 | Ángela Castro | Bolivia | 1:42:25 | +13:13 | |
| 49 | Viktoryia Rashchupkina | Belarus | 1:43:33 | +14:21 | |
| 50 | Mayra Herrera | Guatemala | 1:44:30 | +15:18 | ~~ ~ |
| 51 | Ilse Guerrero | Mexico | 1:45:47 | +16:35 | |
| 52 | Eleonora Giorgi | Italy | 1:46:36 | +17:24 | ~> |
| 53 | Panayiota Tsinopoulou | Greece | 1:47:19 | +18:07 | > |
| | Kimberly García | Peru | DNF | | ~ |
| | Viktória Madarász | Hungary | DNF | | |
| | Saskia Feige | Germany | DNF | | |
| | Glenda Morejón | Ecuador | DNF | | |
| | Yehualeye Beletew | Ethiopia | DNF | | |
