= 2014 World Junior Championships in Athletics – Women's 10,000 metres walk =

The women's 10,000 metres race walk event at the 2014 World Junior Championships in Athletics was held in Eugene, Oregon, USA, at Hayward Field on 23 July.

== Medalists ==
Gold	Anežka Drahotová; Czech Republic
Silver	Wang Na; China
Bronze	Ni Yuanyuan; China

== Records ==
Standing records prior to the 2014 World Junior Championships in Athletics
World Junior Record	Elena Lashmanova (RUS)	42:59.48	Tallinn, Estonia	21 July 2011
Championship Record	Tatiana Mineeva (RUS)	43:24.72	Bydgoszcz, Poland	9 July 2008
World Junior Leading	Viktoryia Rashchupkina (BLR)	46:08.68	Brest, Belarus	23 June 2014
Broken records during the 2014 World Junior Championships in Athletics

== Results ==
=== Final ===
23 July
Start time: 10:28 Temperature: 14 °C Humidity: 88 %

Rank	Name	Nationality	Time	Notes	Red cards ~ Lost contact > Bent knee
1st place, gold medalist(s)	Anežka Drahotová	Czech Republic	42:47.25	WJR	
2nd place, silver medalist(s)	Wang Na	China	44:02.64	PB	~
3rd place, bronze medalist(s)	Ni Yuanyuan	China	44:16.72	PB	
4	Laura García-Caro	Spain	44:32.84	NJR	~~
5	María Pérez	Spain	44:57.30	PB	
6	Rena Goto	Japan	45:54.07	PB	~
7	Kana Minemura	Japan	46:22.88	PB	
8	Stefany Coronado	Bolivia	46:42.06	NJR	
9	Jéssica Hancco	Peru	46:47.31	NJR	
10	Viktoryia Rashchupkina	Belarus	47:00.30		>
11	Katarzyna Zdzieblo	Poland	47:10.01	PB	
12	Živilė Vaiciukevičiūtė	Lithuania	47:19.80	PB	
13	Eleonora Dominici	Italy	47:24.48	PB	
14	Nicole Colombi	Italy	47:38.82	PB	>
15	Mihaela Acatrinei	Romania	47:47.64	PB	
16	Mara Ribeiro	Portugal	47:48.33	PB	
17	Karla Jaramillo	Ecuador	47:59.90	NJR	
18	Tayla-Paige Billington	Australia	48:40.01	PB	>
19	Ganna Suslyk	Ukraine	48:48.46	PB	~
20	Monika Vaiciukevičiūtė	Lithuania	48:50.07	PB	
21	Anél Oosthuizen	South Africa	48:55.26	PB	
22	Carmen Bianca Molnar	Romania	49:06.42	PB	
23	Mariana Mota	Portugal	49:07.82	PB	
24	Sonia Irene Barrondo	Guatemala	49:15.32	NJR	~>
25	María Guadalupe Sánchez	Mexico	49:47.04	PB	>
26	Diana Aydosova	Kazakhstan	49:50.28	PB	
27	Lee Da-seul	South Korea	49:50.90	PB	~>
28	Monika Hornáková	Slovakia	49:52.26	PB	
29	Rita Récsei	Hungary	50:31.88		>
30	Daniela Pastrana	Colombia	51:04.22	PB	
31	Dana Aydosova	Kazakhstan	51:09.74		>
32	Katharine Newhoff	United States	51:40.42	PB	~
	Derya Karakurt	Turkey	DNF		
	Jasmine Dighton	Australia	DQ	230.6(a)	~~~
	Eliška Drahotová	Czech Republic	DQ	230.6(a)	>>>
	Oxana Golyatkina	Russia	DQ	230.6(a)	~~~
	Olga Shargina	Russia	DQ	230.6(a)	>~~

Note:
IAAF Rule 230.6(a) - Repeated failure to comply with the definition of Race Walking

Intermediate times:
1000m: 4:24.56 Anežka Drahotová
2000m: 8:39.46 Anežka Drahotová
3000m: 12:50.67 Anežka Drahotová
4000m: 17:04.34 Anežka Drahotová
5000m: 21:21.15 Anežka Drahotová
6000m: 25:39.66 Anežka Drahotová
7000m: 29:57.03 Anežka Drahotová
8000m: 34:17.93 Anežka Drahotová
9000m: 38:36.45 Anežka Drahotová

== Participation ==
According to an unofficial count, 37 athletes from 26 countries participated in the event.

- Australia (2)
- Belarus (1)
- Bolivia (1)
- China (2)
- Colombia (1)
- Czech Republic (2)
- Ecuador (1)
- Guatemala (1)
- Hungary (1)
- Italy (2)
- Japan (2)
- Kazakhstan (2)
- Lithuania (2)
- Mexico (1)
- Peru (1)
- Poland (1)
- Portugal (2)
- Romania (2)
- Russia (2)
- Slovakia (1)
- South Africa (1)
- South Korea (1)
- Spain (2)
- Turkey (1)
- Ukraine (1)
- United States (1)
