= Athletics at the 2010 Summer Youth Olympics – Girls' 5 kilometre walk =

Athletics – Girls' 5 kilometre walk at the I Summer Youth Olympic Games
- Venue: Bishan Stadium
- Date: August 21
- Competitors: 15 from 15 nations

Medalists
1st place, gold medalist(s)		Anna Clemente	Italy
2nd place, silver medalist(s)		Mao Yanxue	China
3rd place, bronze medalist(s)		Nadezda Leontyeva	Russia

The girls' 5,000 metres walk event at the 2010 Youth Olympic Games was held on 21 August 2010 in Bishan Stadium.

== Schedule ==
Date	Time	Round
21 August 2010	19:00	Final

== Results ==
=== Final ===
Rank	Athlete	Time	Notes
1st place, gold medalist(s)	Anna Clemente (ITA)	22:27.38	PB
2nd place, silver medalist(s)	Mao Yanxue (CHN)	22:29.42	PB
3rd place, bronze medalist(s)	Nadezda Leontyeva (RUS)	22:35.05	
4	Kate Veale (IRL)	22:36.97	
5	Yanelli Caballero (MEX)	22:42.15	PB
6	Alina Galchenko (UKR)	22:47.89	
7	Kimberly García (PER)	23:17.04	PB
8	Katarina Strmenova (SVK)	23:24.65	
9	Ana Bustos (ECU)	23:43.81	PB
10	Aikaterini Theodoropoulou (GRE)	23:44.38	
11	Diana Kacanova (LTU)	24:36.76	
12	Volha Dukhounik (BLR)	25:09.48	
13	Khushbir Kaur (IND)	25:30.27	
14	Jantraporn Vongsuwakunta (THA)	29:06.19	
	Zouina Benamsili (ALG)	DNF	

Intermediate times:

1000m	4:23.83	Alina Galchenko (UKR)
2000m	8:50.74	Alina Galchenko (UKR)
3000m	13:22.84	Alina Galchenko (UKR)
4000m	17:52.97	Alina Galchenko (UKR)
