= 2015 European Athletics U23 Championships – Women's 20 kilometres walk =

The women's 20 kilometres walk event at the 2015 European Athletics U23 Championships was held in Tallinn, Estonia, on 10 July.

== Medalists ==
| Gold | Anežka Drahotová; Czech Republic |
| Silver | Lyudmyla Olyanovska; Ukraine |
| Bronze | Laura García-Caro; Spain |

== Results ==
=== Final ===
10 July

| Rank | Name | Nationality | Time | Notes |
|---|---|---|---|---|
| 1st place, gold medalist(s) | Anežka Drahotová | Czech Republic | 1:27:25 | |
| 2nd place, silver medalist(s) | Lyudmyla Olyanovska | Ukraine | 1:28:41 | |
| 3rd place, bronze medalist(s) | Laura García-Caro | Spain | 1:31:52 | |
| 4 | Nadezhda Sergeyeva | Russia | 1:32:13 | PB |
| 5 | Daryia Balkunets | Belarus | 1:32:36 | PB |
| 6 | Mariavittoria Becchetti | Italy | 1:36:33 | |
| 7 | Viktoryia Rashchupkina | Belarus | 1:37:14 | |
| 8 | Amanda Cano | Spain | 1:38:27 | |
| 9 | Nicole Colombi | Italy | 1:38:50 | PB |
| 10 | Mar Juárez | Spain | 1:39:19 | |
| 11 | Mara Ribeiro | Portugal | 1:39:33 | PB |
| 12 | Valentyna Myronchuk | Ukraine | 1:41:21 | |
| 13 | Monika Horňáková | Slovakia | 1:43:32 | |
| 14 | Mihaela Acatrinei | Romania | 1:44:06 | |
| 15 | Karolina Wierus | Poland | 1:45:19 | |
| 16 | Barbara Kovács | Hungary | 1:46:29 | |
| 17 | Mariana Mota | Portugal | 1:46:52 | |
| 18 | Hele Haapaniemi | Finland | 1:48:57 | |
| 19 | Eglė Juočytė | Lithuania | 1:50:07 | |
| 20 | Tiia Kuikka | Finland | 1:50:34 | |
| 21 | Lucia Čubaňová | Slovakia | 1:56:15 | |
| | Gamze Özgür | Turkey | DNF | |
| | Joanna Bemowska | Poland | DQ | |
| DSQ | Mariya Ponomaryova | Russia | ~~1:27:17~~ | ~~PB~~ |

== Participation ==
According to an unofficial count, 24 athletes from 14 countries participated in the event.

- Belarus (2)
- Czech Republic (1)
- Finland (2)
- Hungary (1)
- Italy (2)
- Lithuania (1)
- Poland (2)
- Portugal (2)
- Romania (1)
- Russia (2)
- Slovakia (2)
- Spain (3)
- Turkey (1)
- Ukraine (2)
