= Gran Premio Cantones de A Coruña de Marcha =

Annual racewalking competition in Spain

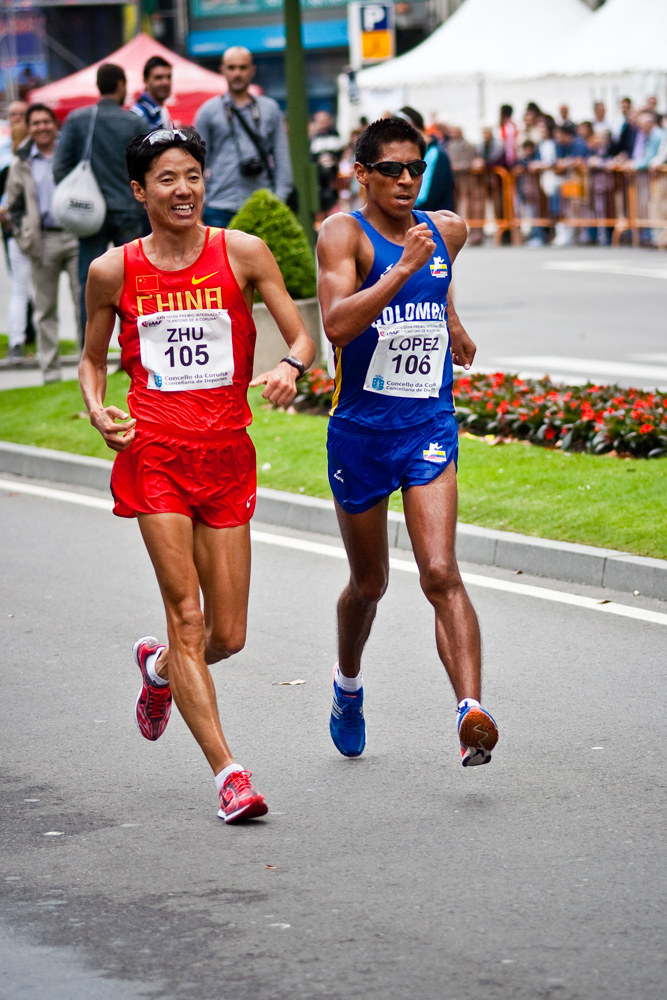
- Yao Zhu battles with Luis Fernando López in the final stretch of the 2010 edition
- Location: A Coruña, Spain
- Event type: Racewalking
- World Athletics Cat.: A (World Athletics Race Walking Tour Gold)
- Distance: 20 km walk (1987–present)
- Established: 1987

The Gran Premio Cantones de A Coruña de Marcha, also known as the Cantones De La Coruña or the Gran Premio de Marcha Cantones de la Coruña-Sergio Vazquez, is an annual Racewalking competition held in A Coruña, Spain. As of 2024, it is a World Athletics Race Walking Tour Gold level meeting – the highest-level circuit of international race walking competitions.

The meeting is organized by the Royal Spanish Athletics Federation, and it is typically held in early June or late May.

== History ==
The race was first held on 16 May 1987, after being planned for about a year prior, with the help of the Xunta de Galicia. With the exception of 2020, it has been held annually since, and it has been a part of the IAAF Race Walking Challenge (now called the World Athletics Race Walking Tour) since 2005 playing host to competitors from 63 countries. Since 2001, both men and women typically walk the 20 km distance, with some exceptions.

The course has also hosted various international championships, beginning in 1996 when it was the host of the 1996 European Race Walking Cup. In 2006, it hosted the 2006 IAAF World Race Walking Cup, and in 2011 it served as the IAAF Race Walking Challenge Final.

One world record has been set at the Gran Premio Cantones de A Coruña de Marcha. In 2015, Liu Hong of China walked a time of 1:24:38 for the 20 km walk, breaking Elmira Alembekova's record from earlier that year. It would not be broken until 2021, when Yang Jiayu walked 1:23:49 at another competition.

In 2019, the meeting received a World Athletics Heritage plaque for its contributions to the sport of athletics.

== Winners ==
Gran Premio Cantones de A Coruna de Marcha senior race winners
Ed.	Date	Men's 20 km walk		Women's 20 km walk		R
Ed.	Date	Winner	Time	Winner	Time	R
1st	16 May 1987	Maurizio Damilano (ITA)	40:19 (10 km)	María Reyes Sobrino (ESP)	21:25 (5 km)	
2nd	5 Jun 1988	Giovanni De Benedictis (ITA)	1:22:37	Kerry Saxby-Junna (AUS)	22:31 (5 km)	
3rd	3 Jun 1989	Ernesto Canto (MEX)	38:51 (10 km)	Erica Alfridi (ITA)	21:41 (5 km)	
4th	12 May 1990	Andrey Perlov (RUS)	39:14 (10 km)	Kerry Saxby-Junna (AUS)	20:46 (5 km)	
5th	13 Apr 1991	Daniel Plaza (ESP)	1:22:53	Victoria Oprea (ROM)	45:56 (10 km)	
6th	6 Jun 1992	Mikhail Shchennikov (URS)	1:18:54	Madelein Svensson (SWE)	43:28 (10 km)	
7th	15 May 1993	Valentí Massana (ESP)	1:20:50	Yelena Nikolayeva (RUS)	43:11 (10 km)	
8th	21 May 1994	Mikhail Shchennikov (RUS)	1:20:34	Yelena Nikolayeva (RUS)	43:09 (10 km)	
9th	20 May 1995	Mikhail Shchennikov (RUS)	1:20:34	Yelena Nikolayeva (RUS)	43:22 (10 km)	
10th (Note: A men's 50 km walk was also held, won by García Bragado of Spain in 3:51:01.)	20 Apr 1996	Robert Korzeniowski (POL)	1:21:46	Annarita Sidoti (ITA)	43:26 (10 km)	
11th	17 May 1997	Ilya Markov (RUS)	1:21:27	Yelena Nikolayeva (RUS)	42:12 (10 km)	
12th	16 May 1998	Jefferson Pérez (ECU)	1:19:40	Annarita Sidoti (ITA)	43:31 (10 km)	
13th	15 May 1999	Paquillo Fernández (ESP)	1:21:55	Claudia Ștef (ROM)	43:04 (10 km)	
14th	20 May 2000	Michele Didoni (ITA)	1:22:45	Claudia Ștef (ROM)	44:35 (10 km)	
15th	9 Jun 2001	David Márquez (ESP)	1:22:54	Olimpiada Ivanova (RUS)	1:31:22	
16th	16 Mar 2002	Mikel Odriozola (ESP)	3:47:55 (50 km)	María Vasco (ESP)	1:28:47	
17th	7 Jun 2003	Robert Korzeniowski (POL)	1:19:56	Yelena Nikolayeva (RUS)	1:27:25	
18th	5 Jun 2004	Paquillo Fernández (ESP)	1:19:19	Claudia Ștef (ROM)	1:27:41	
19th	4 Jun 2005	Paquillo Fernández (ESP)	1:17:52	Cristina López (ESA)	1:30:08	
20th (Note: A men's 50 km was also held, won by Denis Nizhegorodov of Russia in 3:38:02.)	13-14 May 2006	Paquillo Fernández (ESP)	1:18:31	Ryta Turava (BLR)	1:26:27	
21st	2 Jun 2007	Paquillo Fernández (ESP)	1:18:31	Ryta Turava (BLR)	1:28:44	
22nd	7 Jun 2008	Erik Tysse (NOR)	1:19:21	Kjersti Plätzer (NOR)	1:29:38	
23rd	20 Jun 2009	Chu Yafei (CHN)	1:19:51	Sabine Krantz (GER)	1:30:20	
24th	19 Jun 2010	Chu Yafei (CHN)	1:21:11	Beatriz Pascual (ESP)	1:28:05	
25th (Note: Served as the 2011 IAAF Race Walking Challenge Final)	17 Sep 2011	Valeriy Borchin (RUS)	38:43 (10 km)	Olga Kaniskina (RUS)	42:39 (10 km)	
26th	9 Jun 2012	Li Jianbo (CHN)	1:20:55	Liu Hong (CHN)	1:27:32	
27th	1 Jun 2013	Jared Tallent (AUS)	1:21:21	Inês Henriques (POR)	1:29:30	
28th	31 May 2014	Érick Barrondo (GUA)	1:21:14	Liu Hong (CHN)	1:27:39	
29th	6 Jun 2015	Wang Zhen (CHN)	1:18:00	Liu Hong (CHN)	1:24:28 WR	
30th	28 May 2016	Wang Zhen (CHN)	1:20:17	Qieyang Shijie (CHN)	1:28:30	
31st	3 Jun 2017	Álvaro Martín (ESP)	1:19:57	Érica de Sena (BRA)	1:29:16	
32nd	2 Jun 2018	Éider Arévalo (COL)	1:19:14	Qieyang Shijie (CHN)	1:26:28	
33rd	8 Jun 2019	Toshikazu Yamanishi (JPN)	1:17:41	Glenda Morejón (ECU)	1:25:29 AR	
34th	5 Jun 2021	Diego García (ESP)	1:19:44	Sandra Arenas (COL)	1:28:24	
35th	28 May 2022	Álvaro Martín (ESP)	1:19:58	Qieyang Shijie (CHN)	1:27:50	
36th	3 Jun 2023	Caio Bonfim (BRA)	1:18:29	Kimberly García (PER)	1:26:40	
37th	18 May 2024	Toshikazu Yamanishi (JAP)	1:17:47	Kimberly García (PER)	1:26:41	
