= Wang Na =

Wang Na may refer to:

- Front Palace, the viceroy office in Siam, whose holder was second only to the king
- Front Palace, Bangkok, the physical palace occupied by the above

== Sportspeople ==
- Wang Na (synchronised swimmer) (born 1984), Chinese synchronised swimmer
- Wang Na (volleyball) (born 1990), Chinese volleyball player
- Wang Na (field hockey) (born 1994), Chinese field hockey player
- Wang Na (racewalker) (born 1995), Chinese racewalking athlete
