= Peru at the 2011 World Championships in Athletics =

- WA code: PER
- National federation: Federación Deportiva Peruana de Atletismo
- Website: www.fepeatle.com

in Daegu
- Competitors: 5
- Medals: Gold 0 Silver 0 Bronze 0 Total 0

World Championships in Athletics appearances
- 1983; 1987; 1991; 1993; 1995; 1997; 1999; 2001; 2003; 2005; 2007; 2009; 2011; 2013; 2015; 2017; 2019; 2022; 2023; 2025

Peru competed at the 2011 World Championships in Athletics from August 27 to September 4 in Daegu, South Korea. A team of 5 athletes was announced to represent the country in the event.

== Results ==
=== Men ===
Event	Athlete	Preliminaries		Heats		Semifinals		Final	
Event	Athlete	Time Width Height	Rank	Time Width Height	Rank	Time Width Height	Rank	Time Width Height	Rank
Jhon Casallo	Marathon							2:36:43	49
Mario Bazán	3000 metres steeplechase			DNF				Did not advance	
Jorge McFarlane	Long jump	7.66	26					Did not advance	

=== Women ===
Athlete	Event	Preliminaries		Heats		Semifinals		Final	
Athlete	Event	Time Width Height	Rank	Time Width Height	Rank	Time Width Height	Rank	Time Width Height	Rank
Judith Toribio	Marathon							2:47:21	41
Jemena Misayauri	Marathon							DNF	
