= Micaela Rivera Wood =

Peruvian middle-distance and marathon runner

Micaela Wood
Personal information
- Full name: Micaela Rivera Wood
- Nationality: Peru/United States
- Born: 1 January 2000 (age 26)
- Home town: Herriman, Utah
- Education: Utah State University '22 BA Marketing ’23 Master of Data Analytics
- Height: 1.70 m (5 ft 7 in)

Sport
- Country: Peru
- Sport: Track and field, Middle-distance running, Cross country running
- Events: Marathon, 5000 metres, 10,000 metres
- University team: Utah State Aggies
- Club: Eyestone Elite
- Turned pro: 2023
- Coached by: Ed Eyestone
Medal record
Women's athletics
Representing the Peru
South American Indoor Championships
Silver medal – second place	2025 Cochabamba	3000 m
Ibero-American Championships
Silver medal – second place	2024 Cuiabá	5000 m

Micaela Rivera Wood (born 1 January 2000) is a Peruvian athlete competing in track, road running, and cross country running. Wood earned a 2025 South American Indoor Championships in Athletics silver medal. Rivera Wood set a South American record at the 2026 Cherry Blossom Ten Mile Run.

== Professional ==
Wood placed 4th in 2019 at the USATF U20 Outdoor Championships 5000 meters championships, finishing in 17:28.21.

In April 2024, Wood earned two gold medals in 5000m (16:14.59) and 10,000m (34:54.88) at the Peruvian Athletics Sport Federation outdoor track and field championships. She also competed in the 5000 meters event at the 2024 Ibero-American Championships in Athletics in Cuiabá, Brazil, where she placed 2nd.

Wood earned a 2025 South American Indoor Championships in Athletics silver medal at 3000 meters in Cochabamba, Bolivia.

Wood set a South American record and Peruvian record at the 2026 Cherry Blossom Ten Mile Run with a time of 52:55.

Wood debuted in the marathon in December 2025 at The Marathon Project in Chandler, Arizona finishing in 2:31:35. She then placed 9th in the 2026 Copenhagen Marathon in 2:29:13 behind winner Mercy Chebwogen. She also competed in the 2026 New York City Marathon in the professional women's category where she placed 14th and finished in 2:29:52.

In addition to running, Wood has built a large social media following and currently (November 2026) has 79K subscribers on her Youtube channel.

== NCAA Results ==
Representing Utah State University '18 - '23
Year & Championship	Venue	Position	Event	Time
Cross Country Championships
2022 NCAA Division I cross country championships	Oklahoma State University	201st	6 km	21:21.4
2022 Mountain West Conference Cross Country Championship	University of Wyoming	15th	6 km	20:27.2
2021 NCAA Division I cross country championships	Florida State University	135th	6 km	20:44.2
2021 Mountain West Conference Cross Country Championship	University of New Mexico	39th	6 km	20:07.7
2020-1 Mountain West Conference Cross Country Championship	Craig Ranch Regional Park; Las Vegas	29th	6 km	21:16
2019 Mountain West Conference Cross Country Championship	Utah State University	35th	6 km	21:24.4
2018 Mountain West Conference Cross Country Championship	Balboa Park (San Diego)	41st	6 km	22:36
Track and Field Championships
2023 NCAA Division I Outdoor Track and Field Championships	California State University, Sacramento	40th	5000m	16:07.73
2023 NCAA Division I Outdoor Track and Field Championships	California State University, Sacramento	28th	10,000m	33:14.18
2023 Mountain West Conference Outdoor Track and Field Championship	California State University, Fresno	6th	1500m	4:25.58
2023 Mountain West Conference Indoor Track and Field Championship	University of New Mexico	4th	5000m	16:21.42
2023 Mountain West Conference Indoor Track and Field Championship	University of New Mexico	5th	3000m	9:30.84
2022 NCAA Division I Outdoor Track and Field Championships	University of Arkansas	26th	10,000m	34:09.64
2022 Mountain West Conference Outdoor Track and Field Championship	California State University, Fresno	9th	3000m steeplechase	10:25.93
2022 Mountain West Conference Outdoor Track and Field Championship	California State University, Fresno	9th	5000m	16:30.04
2022 Mountain West Conference Indoor Track and Field Championship	University of New Mexico	14th	3000m	9:41.21
2021 Mountain West Conference Outdoor Track and Field Championship	California State University, Fresno	8th	10,000m	35:26.04
2020 Mountain West Conference Indoor Track and Field Championship	University of New Mexico	19th	Mile	5:10.17
2020 Mountain West Conference Indoor Track and Field Championship	University of New Mexico	22nd	3000m	10:14.78
2019 Mountain West Conference Outdoor Track and Field Championship	California State University, Fresno	12th	5000m	16:41.79
2019 Mountain West Conference Indoor Track and Field Championship	University of New Mexico	13th	Mile	5:03.46
2019 Mountain West Conference Indoor Track and Field Championship	University of New Mexico	29th	3000m	10:19.94

== Personal Life ==
Wood graduated from Herriman High School in 2018 as a 8-time Utah High School Activities Association state finalist.

Micaela Rivera Wood married Adam Wood in 2022.
