= 2022 World Athletics Championships – Women's 35 kilometres walk =

Women's 35 kilometres walk at the 2022 World Championships
- Venue: Hayward Field
- Dates: 22 July
- Competitors: 43 from 20 nations
- Winning time: 2:39:16

Medalists
gold medal	Kimberly García	Peru
silver medal	Katarzyna Zdziebło	Poland
bronze medal	Qieyang Shijie	China

Video on YouTube Official Video

The women's 35 kilometres walk at the 2022 World Athletics Championships was held at the Hayward Field in Eugene on 22 July 2022.

== Records ==
Before the competition records were as follows:

Record	Athlete & Nat.	Perf.	Location	Date
World record	world records will be recognised after 1 January 2023			
Championship record	new event			
World Leading	Margarita Nikiforova (RUS)	2:38:49	Cheboksary, Russia	21 May 2022
African Record	Esther Steenkamp (RSA)	3:42:04	Cape Town, South Africa	15 January 2022
Asian Record	Qieyang Shijie (CHN)	2:43:06	Dudince, Slovakia	23 April 2022
North, Central American and Caribbean record	Robyn Stevens (USA)	2:49:29	Dudince, Slovakia	23 April 2022
South American Record	Kimberly García (PER)	2:43:19	Dudince, Slovakia	23 April 2022
European Record	María Pérez (ESP)	2:39:16	Lepe, Spain	30 January 2022
Oceanian record	No ratified record			

== Qualification standard ==
The standard to qualify automatically for entry was 2:54:00 or 4:25:00 over 50 kilometres.

== Schedule ==
The event schedule, in local time (UTC−7), was as follows:

Date	Time	Round
22 July	06:15	Final

== Results ==
The final started at 06:15.

Rank	Name	Nationality	Time	Notes
1st place, gold medalist(s)	Kimberly García	Peru	2:39:16	CR, AR, NR
2nd place, silver medalist(s)	Katarzyna Zdziebło	Poland	2:40:03	NR
3rd place, bronze medalist(s)	Qieyang Shijie	China	2:40:37	AR, NR
4	Antigoni Drisbioti	Greece	2:41:58	NR
5	Raquel González	Spain	2:42:27	PB
6	Laura García-Caro	Spain	2:42:45	PB
7	Li Maocuo	China	2:44:28	PB
8	Viviane Lyra	Brazil	2:45:02	NR
9	Serena Sonoda	Japan	2:45:09	PB
10	Yin Lamei	China	2:46:02	PB
11	Olga Niedziałek	Poland	2:49:43	PB
12	Magaly Bonilla	Ecuador	2:50:39	
13	Inês Henriques	Portugal	2:51:12	SB
14	Nadia González	Mexico	2:52:06	NR
15	Mirna Ortíz	Guatemala	2:54:00	
16	Paola Pérez	Ecuador	2:54:15	
17	Galina Yakusheva	Kazakhstan	2:54:50	PB
18	Evelyn Inga	Peru	2:56:04	
19	Vitória Oliveira	Portugal	2:57:37	
20	Elisa Neuvonen	Finland	2:57:42	NR
21	Alejandra Ortega	Mexico	2:58:46	
22	Maria Michta-Coffey	United States	2:58:51	PB
23	Hana Burzalová	Slovakia	2:59:32	PB
24	Stephanie Casey	United States	3:00:54	PB
25	Yasury Palacios	Guatemala	3:01:16	
26	Ana Veronica Rodean	Romania	3:01:29	SB
27	Efstathia Kourkoutsaki	Greece	3:02:27	PB
28	Aura Morales	Mexico	3:04:50	
29	Miranda Melville	United States	3:05:31	
30	Elianay Pereira	Brazil	3:05:39	PB
31	Mayara Luize Vicentainer	Brazil	3:06:10	
32	Ema Hačundová	Slovakia	3:07:02	PB
33	Jaaneth Mamani	Bolivia	3:07:16	PB
34	Kelly Ruddick	Australia	3:11:55	
35	Sandra Silva	Portugal	3:17:23	PB
	Tereza Ďurdiaková	Czech Republic	DNF	
	Christina Papadopoulou	Greece	DNF	
	Mihaela Acatrinei	Romania	DNF	
	Nadiya Borovska	Ukraine	DNF	
	Tiia Kuikka	Finland	DQ	
	Polina Repina	Kazakhstan	DQ	
