= List of Peruvian records in athletics =

The following are the national records in athletics in Peru maintained by its national athletics federation: Federación Deportiva Peruana de Atletismo (FDPA).

== Outdoor ==
Key to tables: Awaiting ratification Record not kept by FDPA Not ratified or later rescined by FDPA

=== Men ===
Event	Record	Athlete	Date	Meet	Place	Ref.
100 m	10.28 (+0.4 m/s)	Andy Martínez	22 April 2016		Tarija, Bolivia	
100 m	10.2 h	Fernando Acevedo	August 1970	Bolivarian Games	Maracaibo, Venezuela	
100 m	10.2 h A	Fernando Acevedo	4 October 1969		Quito, Ecuador	
200 m	20.58 A (+1.7 m/s)	Andy Martínez	24 April 2016	Torneo Julia Iriarte	Tarija, Bolivia	
400 m	45.30 A	Fernando Acevedo	1 August 1971	Pan American Games	Cali, Colombia	
800 m	1:46.39	Marco Vilca	11 May 2024	Ibero-American Championships	Cuiabá, Brazil	
1500 m	3:34.67	David Torrence	18 June 2017	Diamond League	Stockholm, Sweden	
Mile	3:54.99	David Torrence	31 August 2016	Hoka One One Long Island Mile	Long Island, United States	
3000 m	7:57.95	Mario Bazán	14 June 2008	Ibero-American Championships	Iquique, Chile	
5000 m	13:23.20	David Torrence	17 August 2016	Olympic Games	Rio de Janeiro, Brazil	
5 km (road)	15:06+	Cristhian Pacheco	19 February 2023	Seville Marathon	Seville, Spain	
10,000 m	27:53.58	José Luis Ostos	5 May 2016	Payton Jordan Invitational	Stanford, United States	
10 km (road)	28:25	José Luis Ostos	9 October 2016		Lima, Peru	
15 km (road)	42:51	José Castillo	26 February 1994		Tampa, United States	
20 km (road)	59:01+	Willy Canchanya	24 March 2018	World Half Marathon Championships	Valencia, Spain	
Half marathon	1:02:06	Rene Champi	27 August 2023		Buenos Aires, Argentina	
25 km (road)	1:17:07+	Raúl Pacheco	12 April 2015	Rotterdam Marathon	Rotterdam, Netherlands	
25 km (road)	1:16:01+	Cristhian Pacheco	19 February 2023	Seville Marathon	Seville, Spain	
30 km (road)	1:32:50+	Raúl Pacheco	12 April 2015	Rotterdam Marathon	Rotterdam, Netherlands	
30 km (road)	1:30:55+	Cristhian Pacheco	19 February 2023	Seville Marathon	Seville, Spain	
Marathon	2:07:38	Cristhian Pacheco	19 February 2023	Seville Marathon	Seville, Spain	
110 m hurdles	13.52 A (±0.0 m/s)	Javier McFarlane	26 June 2016	Gran Prix Internacional "Valle Oro Puro"	Cali, Colombia	
110 m hurdles	13.5 h (−1.8 m/s)	Jorge McFarlane	31 May 2013	Campeonato Nacional de Mayores	Lima, Peru	
400 m hurdles	52.20 (Note: best electronic timed mark)	Mauro Mina	1 November 1992		Santiago, Chile	
400 m hurdles	51.6 h (Note: ratified as national record)	Mauro Mina	3 July 1993		Lima, Peru	
3000 m steeplechase	8:28.67	Mario Bazán	15 August 2009	World Championships	Berlin, Germany	
High jump	2.31 m A	Arturo Chávez	11 June 2016	Encuentro Internacional "Wilfrido Massiel"	Mexico City, Mexico	
Pole vault	5.18 m	Francisco Léon	12 May 2005		Abilene, United States	
Long jump	8.11 m (+2.0 m/s) (Note: outdoor best; indoor mark ratified as absolute record)	José Luis Mandros	30 May 2025	GP Diputacion Castellon - Memorial Jose Antonio Cansino	Castellón de la Plana, Spain	
Triple jump	16.72 m A NWI	Ricardo Valiente	14 November 1987		Huancayo, Peru	
Shot put	20.02 m	Michael Putman	9 June 2013	38th Annual Northwest Track & Field Classics	Miami, United States	
Discus throw	57.96 m	Michael Putman	18 March 2011	USF Bulls Invitational	Tampa, United States	
Hammer throw	67.26 m	Eduardo Acuña	20 June 2009	South American Championships	Lima, Peru	
Javelin throw	69.46 m	Jorge Quiñones	4 September 1999		Lima, Peru	
Decathlon	7190 pts h	Miro Ronac	7–8 June 1980		Mainz, West Germany	
Decathlon	100m (wind) / Long jump (wind) / Shot put / High jump / 400m / 110m H (wind) / Discus / Pole vault / Javelin / 1500m; 11.5 / 6.70 m / 12.95 m / 1.92 m / 53.2 / 16.5 / 45.60 m / 4.10 m / 62.20 m / 4:42.3					
5,000 m walk (track)	18:59.87	Luis Henry Campos	11 July 2026	VI Festival de Atletismo La Victoria	Lima, Peru	
5 km walk (road)	19:48+	César Augusto Rodríguez	18 May 2024	XXXVII Gran Premio Cantones de A Coruna de Marcha	La Coruña, Spain	
10,000 m walk (track)	39:30.86	Luis Henry Campos	29 March 2025	Peruvian Championships	Lima, Peru	
10 km walk (road)	39:37+	César Augusto Rodríguez	18 May 2024	XXXVII Gran Premio Cantones de A Coruna de Marcha	La Coruña, Spain	
15 km walk (road)	58:59+	César Augusto Rodríguez	18 May 2024	XXXVII Gran Premio Cantones de A Coruna de Marcha	La Coruña, Spain	
20,000 m walk (track)	1:21:25.6 h	Luis Henry Campos	29 July 2023	South American Championships	São Paulo, Brazil	
20 km walk (road)	1:18:23	César Augusto Rodríguez	18 May 2024	XXXVII Gran Premio Cantones de A Coruna de Marcha	La Coruña, Spain	
Half Marathon walk	1:24:45 (Note: The accurate stopped time is 1:24:44.3)	Luis Henry Campos	23 September 2026	South American Games	Santa Fe, Argentina	
30 km walk (road)	2:07:57+	César Rodríguez	24 July 2022	World Championships	Eugene, United States	
35 km walk (road)	2:29:24	César Rodríguez	24 July 2022	World Championships	Eugene, United States	
50 km walk (road)	3:56:35	Pavel Chihuán	3 May 2014	IAAF World Race Walking Cup	Taicang, China	
4 × 100 m relay	40.38 A (Note: best electronic timed mark)	Peru; Javier del Rio; Giorgio Mautino; Marco Mautino; Moisés del Castillo	23 July 1988		Mexico City, Mexico	
4 × 100 m relay	40.3 h A (Note: ratified as national record)	Peru; Moisés del Castillo; Marco Mautino; Giorgio Mautino; Óscar Fernández	20 July 1988		Quito, Ecuador	
4 × 400 m relay	3:08.53 A	Peru; Jorge Aleman; J. Siguas; A. Marchinares; Fernando Acevedo	5 August 1971	Pan American Games	Cali, Colombia	

=== Women ===
Event	Record	Athlete	Date	Meet	Place	Ref.
60 m	7.40 (+1.9 m/s)	Paula Daruich	28 March 2026	III Control Preparatorio	Lima, Peru	
100 m	11.60 (+1.7 m/s)	Paula Daruich	29 May 2026	Ibero-American Championships	Lima, Peru	
100 m	11.2 h A	Carmela Bolivar	November 1981	South American Championships	La Paz, Bolivia	
200 m	23.55 A NWI	Carmela Bolivar	11 November 1978	Southern Cross Games	La Paz, Bolivia	
400 m	53.86	Maitte Torres	20 May 2017	Grand Prix "Marco Boroco"	Cuenca, Ecuador	
800 m	2:05.57	Anita Poma	5 July 2022	Bolivarian Games	Valledupar, Colombia	
1500 m	4:12.33	Anita Poma	12 May 2024	Ibero-American Championships	Cuiabá, Brazil	
3000 m	9:18.45	Soledad Torre	14 May 2016	Ibero-American Championships	Rio de Janeiro, Brazil	
5000 m	15:30.63	Inés Melchor	28 November 2013	Bolivarian Games	Trujillo, Peru	
5 km (road)	15:50	Ena Weinstein	15 February 1992		Fort Myers, United States	
10,000 m	31:56.62	Inés Melchor	2 May 2015	Payton Jordan Cardinal Invitational	Palo Alto, United States	
10 km (road)	31:44 Wo	Thalia Valdivia	26 April 2025	Adizero: Road to Records	Herzogenaurach, Germany	
15 km (road)	49:17+	Sheyla Eulogio Paucar	29 March 2026	Berlin Half Marathon	Berlin, Germany	
15 km (road)	49:17+ Wo	Micaela Rivera Wood	12 April 2026	Cherry Blossom Ten Mile Run	Washington, D.C., United States	
10 miles (road)	52:55 Wo	Micaela Rivera Wood	12 April 2026	Cherry Blossom Ten Mile Run	Washington, D.C., United States	
20 km (road)	1:06:11 + Wo	Sheyla Eulogio Paucar	20 September 2026	World Road Running Championships	Copenhagen, Denmark	
Half marathon	1:09:42 Wo	Sheyla Eulogio Paucar	20 September 2026	World Road Running Championships	Copenhagen, Denmark	
25 km (road)	1:25:48+	Gladys Tejeda	20 February 2022	Seville Marathon	Seville, Spain	
30 km (road)	1:42:50+	Gladys Tejeda	20 February 2022	Seville Marathon	Seville, Spain	
Marathon	2:25:23	Thalia Valdivia	14 April 2024	Rotterdam Marathon	Rotterdam, Netherlands	
100 m hurdles	13.25 (+0.5 m/s)	Diana Bazalar	7 August 2019	Pan American Games	Lima, Peru	
400 m hurdles	58.04	Kimberly Cardoza	6 August 2019	Pan American Games	Lima, Peru	
2000 m steeplechase	6:40.28	Zulema Arenas	27 October 2012	South American Youth Championships	Mendoza, Argentina	
3000 m steeplechase	9:52.32	Zulema Arenas	24 November 2017	Bolivarian Games	Santa Marta, Colombia	
High jump	1.82 m	Candy Toche	22 June 2019	Grand Prix de Cali	Cali, Colombia	
Pole vault	4.20 m	Nicole Hein	14 July 2019		Walldorf, Germany	
Pole vault	4.25 m A	Nicole Hein	22 February 2020		Mexico City, Mexico	
Long jump	6.66 m A (+1.5 m/s)	Paola Mautino	6 June 2018	South American Games	Cochabamba, Bolivia	
Triple jump	13.56 m A (+0.2 m/s)	Silvana Segura	7 June 2018		Cochabamba, Bolivia	
Shot put	16.66 m	Alessandra Gamboa	16 April 2016	Peruvian Championships	Lima, Peru	
Discus throw	48.34 m (Note: by World Athletics source, 48.24 by FDPA source)	Elvira Yufra	3 December 1988		Lima, Peru	
Hammer throw	69.69 m	Ximena Zorrilla	7 April 2024	Peruvian Championships	Lima, Peru	
Javelin throw	49.24 m	Jimena Gómez	28 May 2017	Peruvian Championships	Lima, Peru	
Javelin throw	50.01 m	Kimberly Flores	31 October 2025	South American U20 Championships	Lima, Peru	
Heptathlon	5141 pts	Kimberly Cardoza	23–24 November 2017		Santa Marta, Colombia	
Heptathlon	100m H (wind) / High jump / Shot put / 200m (wind) / Long jump (wind) / Javelin / 800m; 14.40 (+1.8 m/s) / 1.67 m / 10.65 m / 25.84 (+2.0 m/s) / 5.50 m (+1.5 m/s) / 27.66 m / 2:15.56					
5000 m walk (track)	21:53.8 h	Yuli Magali Capcha	14 May 2011	Grand Prix Internacional de Marcha	Barranco, Peru	
5000 m walk (track)	20:35.38	Mary Luz Andía	16 August 2025	V Festival de Atletismo La Victoria	Lima, Peru	
5 km walk (road)	21:54+	Kimberly García	13 May 2017		Lima, Peru	
5 km walk (road)	21:35+	Kimberly García	1 August 2024	Olympic Games	Paris, France	
10,000 m walk (track)	42:56.97	Kimberly García	25 August 2018	Ibero-American Championships	Trujillo, Peru	
10,000 m walk (track)	42:45.06	Kimberly García	30 May 2026	Ibero-American Championships	Lima, Peru	
10 km walk (road)	43:23	Kimberly García	25 September 2017		Mudu, China	
20,000 m walk (track)	1:29:07.5	Mary Luz Andía	28 July 2023	South American Championships	São Paulo, Brazil	
20 km walk (road)	1:26:40	Kimberly García	3 June 2023	Gran Premio Cantones de La Coruna	A Coruña, Spain	
20 km walk (road)	1:26:22	Kimberly García	20 September 2025	World Championships	Tokyo, Japan	
Half marathon walk	1:33:49	Evelyn Inga	7 March 2026	Dudinská Päťdesiatka	Dudince, Slovakia	
Half marathon walk	1:31:44	Kimberly García	8 May 2026	Poděbrady Walking	Poděbrady, Czech Republic	
35 km walk (road)	2:37:44	Kimberly García	25 March 2023	Dudinská Päťdesiatka	Dudince, Slovakia	
50 km walk (road)	4:22:57	Evelyn Inga	21 April 2019	Pan American Race Walking Cup	Lázaro Cárdenas, Mexico	
4 × 100 m relay	46.28	Peru; Paola Mautino; Maitte Torres; Diana Bazalar; Gabriela Delgdo	23 November 2017	Bolivarian Games	Santa Marta, Colombia	
4 × 400 m relay	3:42.74	Peru; Triana Alonso; Maitte Torres; Esperanza Manrique; Kimberly Cardoza	26 May 2019	South American Championships	Lima, Peru	

=== Mixed ===
Event	Record	Athlete	Date	Meet	Place	Ref.
4 × 400 m relay	3:33.41	Peru; Rodrigo Cornejo; Laura Vila; Jeffrey Cajo; Luciana Fernandez	10 May 2024	Ibero-American Championships	Cuiabá, Brazil	
4 × 400 m relay	3:30.75	Peru; Estefania Papi; Jeffrey Cajo; Laura Vila; Rodrigo Cornejo	5 December 2025	Bolivarian Games	Lima, Peru	

== Indoor ==
=== Men ===
Event	Record	Athlete	Date	Meet	Place	Ref.
50 m	5.6	Fernando Acevedo	28 January 1978		Böblingen, Germany	
60 m	6.76 A	Aron Earl	27 January 2024	South American Championships	Cochabamba, Bolivia	
200 m	21.98	Javier Verme Villaran	7 March 1997	World Championships	Paris, France	
400 m	47.84 A	Marco Vilca	1 February 2020	South American Championships	Cochabamba, Bolivia	
800 m	1:47.88	Marco Vilca	28 January 2023	Texas Tech Open	Lubbock, United States	
1000 m	2:26.48	Marco Vilca	14 January 2022	Corky Classic	Lubbock, United States	
1500 m	3:39.79	David Torrence	4 February 2017	Weltklasse in Karlsruhe	Karlsruhe, Germany	
Mile	3:57.63	David Torrence	28 January 2017	New Balance Indoor Grand Prix	Boston, United States	
3000 m	8:29.72	Diego Moreno-Guzman	24 February 2007		Nampa, United States	
3000 m	8:18.12 OT	Diego Moreno-Guzman	3 March 2007		Seattle, United States	
60 m hurdles	7.98	Jorge McFarlane	23 February 2010		Santiago, Chile	
High jump	2.23 m	Hugo Muñoz	6 February 1999		Moscow, United States	
Pole vault	5.10 m A	Francisco León	10 January 2004		Reno, United States	
Long jump	8.17 m A	José Luis Mandros	20 February 2022	South American Championships	Cochabamba, Bolivia	
Triple jump	15.19 m	Piero Vojvodic	15 February 2002		Moscow, United States	
Shot put	19.20 m	Michael Putman	23 February 2012	ACC Championship	Roxbury, United States	
Heptathlon	4269 OT	Alvaro Romero	10 January 2014	GVSU Bob Eubanks Open	Allendale, United States	
Heptathlon	60m / Long jump / Shot put / High jump / 60m H / Pole vault / 1000m; 7.28 / 6.52 m / 10.08 m / 1.80 m / 8.91 / 3.20 m / 3:18.67					
5000 m walk						
4 × 400 m relay						

=== Women ===
Event	Record	Athlete	Date	Meet	Place	Ref.
60 m	7.74	Sandra Reátegui	26 January 2002		Logan, United States	
200 m	24.45 A OT	Sandra Reátegui	23 February 2002		Flagstaff, United States	
400 m						
800 m						
1500 m	4:21.77	Anita Poma	21 March 2025	World Championships	Nanjing, China	
3000 m	9:25.57	Ena Weinstein	27 February 1987		New York City, United States	
50 m hurdles	7.1 h	Edith Noeding	28 January 1976		Munich, Germany	
60 m hurdles	8.51 A	Diana Bazalar	30 January 2020	Grand Prix de Cochabamba	Cochabamba, Bolivia	
High jump	1.73 m	Daniella Munoz	19 February 2021	GVSU Tune Up	Allendale, United States	
Pole vault	4.00 m A	Nicole Hein	1 February 2020	South American Championships	Cochabamba, Bolivia	
Long jump	5.83 m A	Alejandra Arevalo	18 February 2022	South American Meeting Jürgen Berodt	Cochabamba, Bolivia	
Triple jump	13.07 m A	Silvana Segura	2 February 2020	South American Championships	Cochabamba, Bolivia	
Shot put						
Pentathlon						
Pentathlon	60m H / High jump / Shot put / Long jump / 800m					
3000 m walk						
4 × 400 m relay						
