= Kaori Kawazoe =

Japanese racewalker

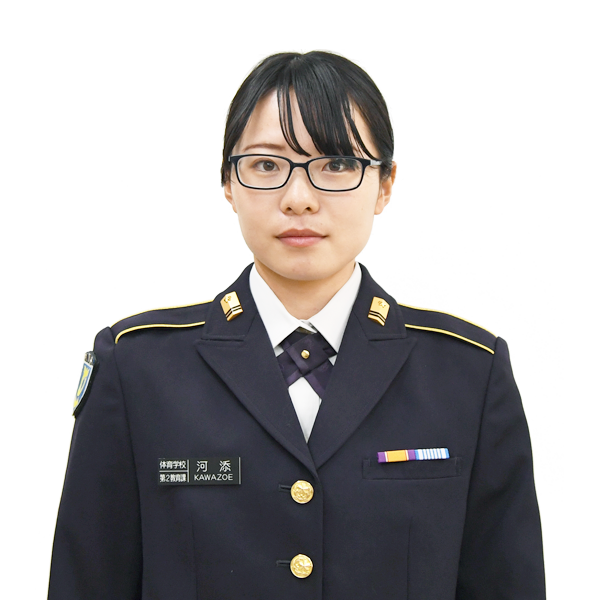

Personal information
- Nationality: Japanese
- Born: 30 September 1995 (age 30)

Sport
- Sport: Athletics
- Event: Racewalking

Kaori Kawazoe (河添香織, born 30 September 1995) is a Japanese racewalking athlete. She qualified to represent Japan at the 2020 Summer Olympics in Tokyo 2021, competing in women's 20 kilometres walk.
