= Hanna Shevchuk =

Ukrainian racewalker

Personal information
- Nationality: Ukrainian
- Born: 18 July 1996 (age 29)

Sport
- Sport: Athletics
- Event: Racewalking

Hanna Shevchuk (née Suslyk) (born 18 July 1996) is a Ukrainian racewalking athlete.

== Career ==
She competed in women's 20 kilometres walk at the 2020 Summer Olympics

She competed in the women's 20 kilometres walk at the 2022 World Athletics Championships held in Eugene, Oregon, United States.
