= Hortensia Arzapalo =

Peruvian long-distance runner

Personal information
- Born: 29 July 1981 (age 44)

Sport
- Country: Peru
- Sport: Track and field
- Event: long-distance running
- Updated on 2 September 2015

Hortensia Arzapalo (born 29 July 1981) is a Peruvian long-distance runner. She competed in the marathon event at the 2015 World Championships in Athletics in Beijing, China.

== See also ==
- Peru
- Peru at the 2015 World Championships in Athletics
