= Diana Kačanova =

Lithuanian racewalker (born 1993)

Diana Kačanova (born 7 January 1993) is a Lithuanian race walker, who internationally competes for Lithuania. At 2010 in Moscow she reached her personal 5000 m walking record - 23:29.6.

She represented Lithuania in 2009 World Youth Championships in Athletics, where she reached 16th place. Kačanova also represented her country in 2010 Summer Youth Olympics.

== Achievements ==
Year	Competition	Venue	Position	Event	Notes
Representing Lithuania
2009	World Youth Championships in Athletics	Brixen, Italy	16th	5000 m	24:47.22
2010	Youth olympics	Singapore City, Singapore	11th	5000 m	24:36.76
2011	European Race Walking Cup (U20)	Olhão, Portugal	13th	10 km	51:06
2011	European Junior Championships	Tallinn, Estonia	8th	10000 m	49:50.07 (PB)
