= Peru at the 2009 World Championships in Athletics =

- WA code: PER

in Berlin
- Competitors: 4
- Medals: Gold 0 Silver 0 Bronze 0 Total 0

World Championships in Athletics appearances
- 1983; 1987; 1991; 1993; 1995; 1997; 1999; 2001; 2003; 2005; 2007; 2009; 2011; 2013; 2015; 2017; 2019; 2022; 2023

Peru competed at the 2009 World Championships in Athletics from 15 to 23 August 2009 in Berlin. The four athletes from Peru failed to win any medals.

== Team selection ==
Event	Athletes	
Event	Men	Women
5000 metres		Inés Melchor
Marathon	Costantino León	
3000 m steeplechase	Mario Bazán	
20 km race walk	Pavel Chihuan	

== Results ==
=== Men ===
Event	Athletes	Heats		Final	
Event	Athletes	Result	Rank	Result	Rank
Marathon	Costantino León	-		2:23:34 SB	52
3000 m steeplechase	Mario Bazán	8:28.67 NR	21	did not advance	
20 km walk	Pavel Chihuan	-		1:27:54	36

=== Women ===
Event	Athletes	Heats		Final	
Event	Athletes	Result	Rank	Result	Rank
5000 m	Inés Melchor	16:00.83	20	did not advance	
