= Athletics at the 2023 Pan American Games – Race walk mixed team =

Mixed team race walk at the 2023 Pan American Games
- Venue: Streets of Santiago
- Dates: November 4
- Competitors: 16 from 8 nations
- Winning time: 2:56:49

Medalists
Gold medal	Brian Pintado; Glenda Morejón	Ecuador
Silver medal	César Rodríguez; Kimberly García	Peru
Bronze medal	Caio Bonfim; Viviane Lyra	Brazil

The mixed team Racewalking competition of the athletics events at the 2023 Pan American Games was held on November 4 on the streets of Santiago, Chile.

== Records ==
Prior to this competition, the existing world and Pan American Games records were as follows:

World record	Inaugural event	—	—	—
Pan American Games record	Inaugural event	—	—	—

== Schedule ==
Date	Time	Round
November 4, 2023	7:30	Final

== Results ==
All times shown are in seconds.

KEY:	q	Fastest non-qualifiers	Q	Qualified	NR	National record	PB	Personal best	SB	Seasonal best	DQ	Disqualified

=== Final ===
The results were as follows

Rank	Nation	Name	Time	Notes
1st place, gold medalist(s)	Ecuador	Brian Pintado; Glenda Morejón	2:56:49	
2nd place, silver medalist(s)	Peru	César Rodríguez; Kimberly García	3:01:14	
3rd place, bronze medalist(s)	Brazil	Caio Bonfim; Viviane Lyra	3:02:14	
4	Mexico	José Luis Doctor; Alejandra Ortega	3:15:12	
5	Colombia	José Leonardo Montaña; Sandra Arenas	3:16:21	
6	United States	Nicholas Christie; Miranda Melville	3:16:52	
7	Independent Athletes Team	José Barrondo; Mirna Ortiz	3:23:30	
8	Costa Rica	Juan Calderón; Noelia Vargas	3:34:58	
