= Anastasiya Rarovskaya =

Belarusian racewalker

Personal information
- Nationality: Belarusian
- Born: 19 June 1996 (age 30)

Sport
- Sport: Athletics
- Event: Racewalking

Anastasiya Rarovskaya (born 19 June 1996) is a Belarusian racewalking athlete. She qualified to represent Belarus at the 2020 Summer Olympics in Tokyo 2021, competing in women's 20 kilometres walk.
