= Laura García-Caro =

Spanish racewalker (born 1995)

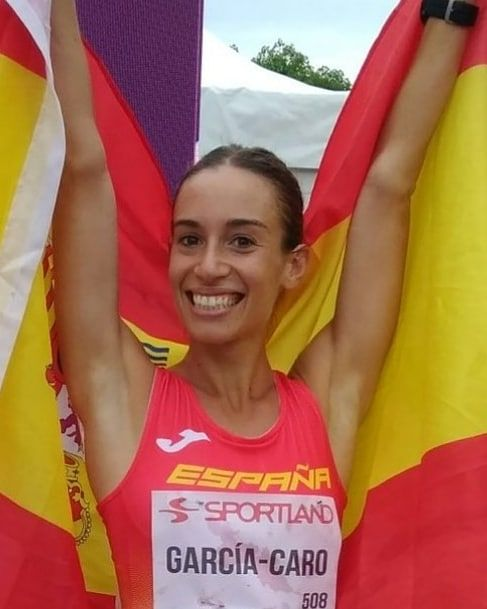

Personal information
- Full name: Laura García-Caro Lorenzo
- Born: 16 April 1995 (age 31) Lepe, Huelva, Spain
- Height: 166 cm (5 ft 5 in)
- Weight: 54 kg (119 lb)

Sport
- Country: Spain
- Sport: Track and field
Medal record
Women's athletics
Representing Spain
World Team Championships
Silver medal – second place	2014 Taicang	10 km (junior team)
Bronze medal – third place	2018 Taicang	20 km (team)
Silver medal – second place	2022 Muscat	35 km (team)
Bronze medal – third place	2024 Antalya	Marathon walk (mixed relay)
European Cup
Bronze medal – third place	2017 Poděbrady	20 km
- Updated on 29 August 2015

Laura García-Caro Lorenzo (born 16 April 1995) is a female racewalker from Spain. She competed in the Women's 20 kilometres walk event at the 2015 World Championships in Athletics in Beijing, China, finishing the 32nd. She went viral during the 2024 European championship for starting to celebrate a bronze medal that she would lose in the last 5 metres of the race

== Competition record ==
Year	Competition	Venue	Position	Event	Notes
Representing Spain
2013	European Junior Championships	Rieti, Italy	5th	10,000 m	47:17
2014	World Junior Championships	Eugene, United States	4th	10,000 m	44:32
2015	European Race Walking Cup	Murcia, Spain	10th	20 km	1:29:32
2015	European U23 Championships	Tallinn, Estonia	5th	20 km	1:31:52
2015	World Championships	Beijing, China	32nd	20 km	1:36:22
2016	Mediterranean U23 Championships	Radès, Tunisia	1st	10,000 m	44:55
2017	European Race Walking Cup	Poděbrady, Czech Republic	3rd	20 km	1:29:57
2017	European U23 Championships	Bydgoszcz, Poland	–	20 km	DQ
2017	World Championships	London, United Kingdom	9th	20 km	1:29:29
2018	World Race Walking Championships	Taicang, China	14th	20 km	1:29:58
2018	European Athletics Championships	Berlin, Germany	6th	20 km	1:28:15
2019	World Championships	Doha, Qatar	33rd	20 km	1:44:05
2021	Olympic Games	Sapporo, Japan	34th	20 km	1:37:48
2022	World Race Walking Championships	Muscat, Oman	14th	35 km	2:52:10
2022	Ibero-American Championships	La Nucía, Spain	1st	10,000 m	43:33.72
2022	World Championships	Eugene, United States	6th	35 km	2:42:45
2024	European Championships	Rome, Italy	4th	20 km	1.28:48

== See also ==
- Spain at the 2015 World Championships in Athletics
