= Katie Hayward =

Australian racewalker (born 2000)

Personal information
- Born: 23 July 2000 (age 25)

Sport
- Country: Australia
- Event: Racewalking
Medal record
Women's racewalking
Representing Australia
Summer Universiade
Gold medal – first place	2019 Naples	20 km walk
Oceania Athletics Championships
Silver medal – second place	2019 Townsville	10,000 m walk
Bronze medal – third place	2022 Mackay	10,000 m walk

Katie Hayward (born 23 July 2000) is an Australian racewalker. She represented Australia at the 2019 World Athletics Championships held in Doha, Qatar and also at the 2020 Summer Olympics held in Tokyo, Japan. At the 2020 Olympics, she came 37th in the women's 20 km walk final with a time of 1:38.11, just on 9 minutes behind the eventual winner Antonella Palmisano.

== Early years ==
Hayward joined Gold Coast Little Athletics at the age of 10. She was always very active and did a range of sports, including nippers, surf lifesaving, dancing, soccer and touch football. At Little Athletics she participated in a walking race and won. As she got older Hayward regularly broke high quality national records, particularly the U18 5000m and U20 10,000m.

In May 2018, Hayward made her international debut in the under-20 race at the World Race Walking Cup in China. Unfortunately she was disqualified. After reviewing this performance Hayward and her coach changed her technique and at the World Juniors/U20s she came fifth. This was Australia's best place in the event for 10 years.

== Career ==
In June 2019, she won the silver medal in the women's 10,000 metres walk at the Oceania Athletics Championships held in Townsville, Australia. The following month, she won the gold medal in the women's 20 kilometres walk event at the Summer Universiade held in Naples, Italy. In the same year, she also competed in the women's 20 kilometres walk event at the World Athletics Championships held in Doha, Qatar.

In 2018, she competed in the women's 10,000 metres walk at the IAAF World U20 Championships held in Tampere, Finland. She finished in 5th place with a personal best of 45:10.42, and qualified for 2020 Summer Olympics in Tokyo, Japan.

== Personal life ==
She studies at Griffith University.

== Achievements ==
Year	Competition	Venue	Position	Event	Notes
Representing Australia
2019	Oceania Athletics Championships	Townsville, Australia	2nd	10,000 m	45:35.81
2019	Summer Universiade	Naples, Italy	1st	20 km	1:33:30
2022	Oceania Athletics Championships	Mackay, Australia	3rd	10,000 m	46:14.77
