= Sandra Arenas =

Colombian race walker

Lorena Arenas Campuzano
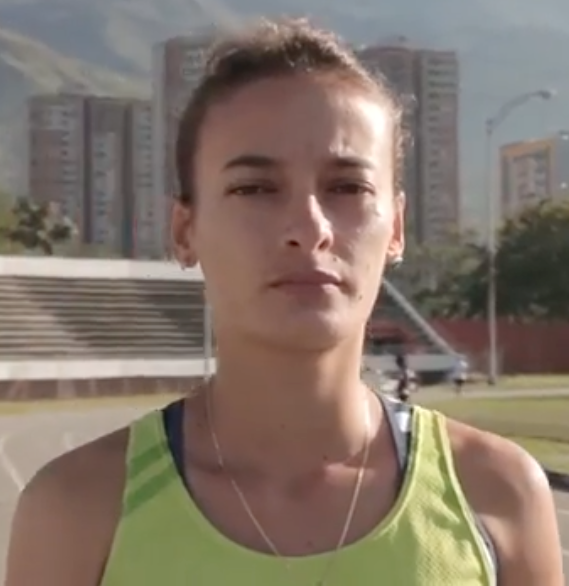
- In a 2016 video

Personal information
- Full name: Sandra Lorena Arenas Campuzano
- Born: 17 September 1993 (age 32) Pereira, Colombia
- Height: 1.60 m (5 ft 3 in)
- Weight: 50 kg (110 lb)

Sport
- Country: Colombia
- Sport: Athletics
- Event: Race walking
- Club: Liga de Antioquia
- Coached by: Brent Vallance

Achievements and titles
- Personal bests: 5,000 m walk: 21:30.33 NR (2023); 10,000 m walk: 42:02.99 AR (2018); 20,000 m walk: 1:31:02.25 NR (2015); 10 km walk: 43:16 NR (2017); 20 km walk: 1:27:03 NR (2024); 35 km walk: 2:44:17 NR (2025)
Medal record
Representing Colombia
Women's athletics
Senior level
Event	1st	2nd	3rd
Olympic Games	0	1	0
World Team Championships	0	0	1
Pan American Games	1	0	0
Pan American Cup	0	2	0
Ibero-American Championships	1	0	0
CAC Games	0	1	0
South American Games	1	0	0
South American Championships	2	0	0
Bolivarian Games	1	1	0
Total	6	5	1
U20 level
Event	1st	2nd	3rd
World U20 Championships	0	0	1
World Team Championships (U20)	1	0	0
Pan American U20 Championships	1	0	0
South American U20 Championships	1	0	0
South American Race Walking Championships	1	1	0
Total	4	1	1
Senior level
Olympic Games
Silver medal – second place	2020 Tokyo	20 km walk
World Team Championships
Bronze medal – third place	2016 Rome	20 km walk (team)
Pan American Games
Gold medal – first place	2019 Lima	20 km walk
Pan American Cup
Silver medal – second place	2013 Guatemala City	20 km walk
Silver medal – second place	2013 Guatemala City	20 km walk (team)
Ibero-American Championships
Gold medal – first place	2018 Lima	10,000 m walk
Central American and Caribbean Games
Silver medal – second place	2014 Veracruz	20 km walk
South American Games
Gold medal – first place	2014 Santiago	20,000 m walk
South American Championships
Gold medal – first place	2013 Cartagena	20,000 m walk
Gold medal – first place	2015 Lima	20,000 m walk
Bolivarian Games
Gold medal – first place	2017 Santa Marta	20 km walk
Silver medal – second place	2013 Trujillo	20 km walk
U20 level
World U20 Championships
Bronze medal – third place	2012 Barcelona	10,000 m walk
World Team Championships (U20)
Gold medal – first place	2012 Saransk	10 km walk
Pan American U20 Championships
Gold medal – first place	2011 Miramar	10,000 m walk
South American U20 Championships
Gold medal – first place	2011 Medellín	10,000 m walk
South American Race Walking Championships
Gold medal – first place	2012 Salinas	10 km walk (U20)
Silver medal – second place	2012 Salinas	10 km walk (team U20)
- Updated on 23 March 2026

Sandra Lorena Arenas Campuzano (born 17 September 1993 in Pereira, Colombia) is a Colombian racewalker. She won the silver medal in the 2020 Summer Olympics in Tokyo in the 20 kilometer race walk. She competed at the 2012 Summer Olympics in London in the 20 kilometer race walk.

In May 2012, Arenas won the women's 10 kilometer event (junior event) at the 2012 IAAF World Race Walking Cup in Saransk, Russia. In July 2012, Arenas won the bronze medal in the 10km race walk event at the 2012 World Junior Championships in Athletics with a time of 45:44.46. Arenas placed 29th in 20km race walk at the 2012 Summer Olympics with a time of 1:33:21. She Again Placed 32nd at the 2016 Summer Olympics, with a time of 1:35:40; She went on to Place Second in the 2020 Summer Olympics, with a time of 1:29:37.

== Personal bests ==
Event	Result	Venue	Date
Track walk
5,000 m	21:30.33 min NR (ht)	Melbourne, Australia	5 March 2023
10,000 m	42:02.99 min AR	Trujillo, Peru	25 August 2018
20,000 m	1:31:02.25 hrs NR (ht)	Lima, Peru	13 June 2015
Road walk
10 km	43:16 min NR	Suzhou, China	25 September 2017
20 km	1:27:03 hrs NR	Paris, France	1 August 2024
35 km	2:44:17 hrs NR	Nomi, Japan	16 March 2025

== International competitions ==
Year	Competition	Venue	Position	Event	Result
Representing the Colombia
2011	Pan American Cup (U20)	Envigado, Colombia	4th	10 km walk	49:51
2011	Pan American Cup (U20)	Envigado, Colombia	4th	10 km walk (team)	16 pts
2011	Pan American U20 Championships	Miramar, United States	1st	10,000 m walk	48:15.78
2011	South American U20 Championships	Medellín, Colombia	1st	10,000 m walk	47:22.68 CR
2012	South American Race Walking Championships (U20)	Salinas, Ecuador	1st	10 km walk	45:17 NU20R
2012	South American Race Walking Championships (U20)	Salinas, Ecuador	2nd	10 km walk (team)	6 pts
2012	World Team Championships (U20)	Saransk, Russia	1st	10 km walk	45:57
2012	World Team Championships (U20)	Saransk, Russia	5th	10 km walk (team)	18 pts
2012	World Race Walking Tour	A Coruña, Spain	8th	20 km walk	1:32:36 NU20R
2012	World U20 Championships	Barcelona, Spain	3rd	10,000 m walk	45:44.46 NU20R
2012	Olympic Games	London, United Kingdom	29th	20 km walk	1:33:21
2013	Pan American Cup	Guatemala City, Guatemala	2nd	20 km walk	1:35:14
2013	Pan American Cup	Guatemala City, Guatemala	2nd	20 km walk (team)	17 pts
2013	South American Championships	Cartagena, Colombia	1st	20,000 m walk	1:37:46.17
2013	World Championships	Moscow, Russia	19th	20 km walk	1:32:25 NR
2013	Bolivarian Games	Trujillo, Peru	2nd	20 km walk	1:34:23
2014	World Race Walking Tour	Chihuahua, Mexico	1st	20 km walk	1:33:24
2014	South American Games	Santiago, Chile	1st	20,000 m walk	1:31:46.9 GR, NU23R
2014	World Team Championships	Taicang, China	24th	20 km walk	1:30:18 NR
2014	Ibero-American Championships	São Paulo, Brazil	5th	10,000 m walk	44:58.26 NU23R
2014	Central American and Caribbean Games	Xalapa, Mexico	2nd	20 km walk	1:36:29 A
2015	South American Championships	Lima, Peru	1st	20,000 m walk	1:31:02.25 NR
2015	Pan American Games	Toronto, Canada	4th	20 km walk	1:32:36
2015	World Championships	Beijing, China	19th	20 km walk	1:33:24
2016	World Team Championships	Rome, Italy	10th	20 km walk	1:29:31 NR
2016	World Team Championships	Rome, Italy	3rd	20 km walk (team)	58 pts
2016	Olympic Games	Rio de Janeiro, Brazil	32nd	20 km walk	1:35:40
2017	Pan American Cup	Lima, Peru	4th	20 km walk	1:32:15
2017	World Championships	London, United Kingdom	5th	20 km walk	1:28:10 NR
2017	Bolivarian Games	Santa Marta, Colombia	1st	20 km walk	1:32:39 GR
2018	World Team Championships	Taicang, China	15th	20 km walk	1:30:11
2018	World Team Championships	Taicang, China	5th	20 km walk (team)	82 pts
2018	Ibero-American Championships	Trujillo, Peru	1st	10,000 m walk	42:02.99 CR, AR
2019	Pan American Games	Lima, Peru	1st	20 km walk	1:28:03 GR, NR
2019	World Championships	Doha, Qatar	5th	20 km walk	1:34:16
2021	Olympic Games	Sapporo, Japan	2nd	20 km walk	1:29:37
2023	World Championships	Budapest, Hungary	—N/a	20 km walk	DNF
2023	Pan American Games	Santiago, Chile	5th	Marathon walk relay	3:16:21
2024	World Team Championships	Antalya, Turkey	15th	Marathon walk relay	3:04:57
2024	Olympic Games	Paris, France	4th	20 km walk	1:27:03 NR
2024	Olympic Games	Paris, France	12th	Marathon walk relay	2:57:54
