= Mary Luz Andía =

Peruvian racewalker (born 2000)

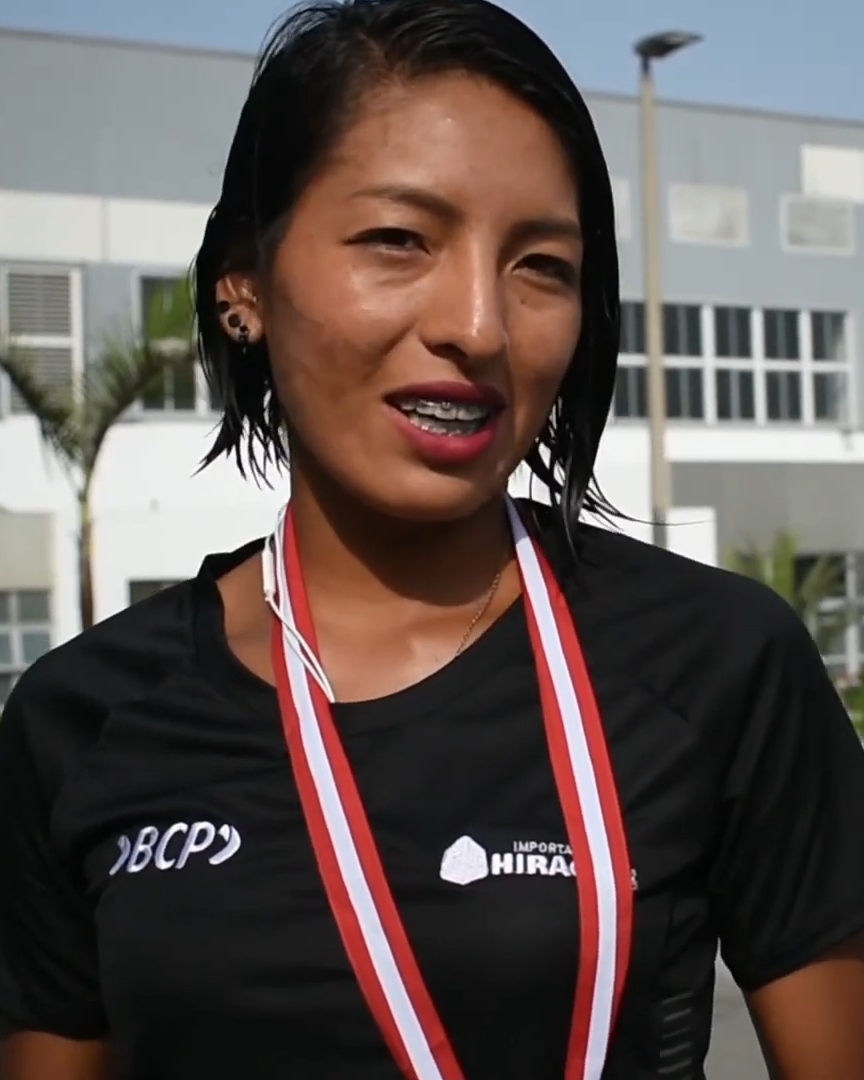

Personal information
- Full name: Mary Luz Andía Arotaipe
- Born: 9 November 2000 (age 25) Cusco, Peru

Sport
- Sport: Athletics
- Event: Race walking
Medal record
Representing Peru
Women's athletics
World Team Championships
Silver medal – second place	2024 Antalya	20 km walk (team)
Pan American Cup
Gold medal – first place	2025 Anapoima	20 km walk
Silver medal – second place	2023 Managua	20 km walk
Ibero-American Championships
Silver medal – second place	2026 Lima	10,000 m walk
South American Championships
Gold medal – first place	2023 Sao Paulo	20,000 m walk
South American Race Walking Championships
Bronze medal – third place	2020 Lima	20 km walk
Bolivarian Games
Silver medal – second place	2025 Lima-Ayacucho	Half marathon walk
Junior Pan American Games
Silver medal – second place	2021 Cali-Valle	20,000 m walk
Pan American U20 Championships
Silver medal – second place	2019 San José	10,000 m walk
South American U23 Championships
Silver medal – second place	2021 Guayaquil	20,000 m walk

Mary Luz Andía Arotaipe (born 9 November 2000) is a Peruvian racewalking athlete. She is the 2023 South American champion in the 20,000 metre walk. She is also a Junior Pan American Games and Bolivarian Games silver medalist. She qualified to represent Peru at the 2020 and 2024 Summer Olympics.

== Career ==
Andía began racewalking when she was 13 years old after it was recommended by her physical education teacher. She finished 12th in the 10,000 metres walk at the 2018 World U20 Championships.

At the 2019 Gran Premio Cantones de la Coruña, Andía earned a qualifying time for the 2019 Pan American Games, the 2019 World Athletics Championships, and the 2020 Summer Olympics. She went on to place tenth at the Pan American Games. She set a championship record in the 10,000 metre walk at the 2019 South American U20 Championships to win the title. Additionally, she was the runner-up at the 2019 Pan American U20 Championships.

Andía represented Peru at the 2020 Summer Olympics and finished 24th in the 20 kilometres walk. She won a silver medal at the 2021 Junior Pan American Games, behind Glenda Morejón, and she also finished second to Morejón at the 2021 South American U23 Championships.

Andía missed most of the 2022 season due to her pregnancy, but she returned to training one month after giving birth. At the 2023 South American Championships, she won the 20,000 metres race walk, set the new South American record, and qualified for the 2024 Summer Olympics. She then competed at the 2023 World Athletics Championships and finished 31st.

Andía represented Peru at the 2024 Summer Olympics and finished 12th in the 20 kilometres walk. She also competed at the 2025 World Athletics Championships where she finished tenth in the 20 kilometres walk. She won a silver medal at the 2025 Bolivarian Games in the half marathon walk, behind teammate Kimberly García.

== Personal life ==
Andía was born in Cusco, Peru. She moved away from her family to Arequipa when she was 14 for her training. She is married to fellow racewalker Luis Henry Campos, and they have a daughter who was born in September 2022.
