= Anna Clemente =

Italian race walker (born 1994)

Personal information
- Born: 6 January 1994 (age 32) Castellaneta, Italy
- Height: 1.68 m (5 ft 6 in)
- Weight: 55 kg (121 lb)

Sport
- Country: Italy
- Sport: Athletics
- Event: Racewalking
- Club: G.S. Fiamme Gialle

Achievements and titles
- Personal best: 10 km: 46:42 (2010)
Medal record
Event	1st	2nd	3rd
Youth Olympic Games	1	0	0

Anna Clemente (born 6 January 1994 in Castellaneta) is an Italian race walker.

== Biography ==
In 2010, she became the first Italian athlete to win a medal at the Youth Olympic Games.

== Achievements ==
Year	Competition	Venue	Position	Event	Notes
Representing Italy
2010	Summer Youth Olympics	Singapore	1st	5000 m walk	22:27.38
2011	European Race Walking Cup (U20)	Olhão, Portugal	4th	10 km	49:08
2011	European Race Walking Cup (U20)	Olhão, Portugal	2nd	Team - 10 km Junior	9 pts
2011	World Youth Championships	Villeneuve d'Ascq, France	8th	5000 m walk	22:47.32
2012	World Race Walking Cup (U20)	Saransk, Russia	14th	10 km	48:25
2012	World Junior Championships	Barcelona, Spain	15th	10,000 m walk	48:22.25
2013	European Race Walking Cup (U20)	Dudince, Slovakia	16th	10 km	50:48

== See also ==
- Italy at the 2010 Summer Youth Olympics
