= Wang Na (race walker) =

Chinese racewalker

Wang Na (Chinese: 王娜; born 29 May 1995) is a Chinese female racewalking athlete.

Wang's first international success came at the 2014 World Junior Championships in Athletics where she was the 10,000 m walk runner-up to Czech athlete Anežka Drahotová.

Senior success followed at the 2017 Asian Race Walking Championships, which she won over two minutes clear of the runner-up Kumiko Okada. On the circuit that year she was third at the Taicang Race Walking Challenge and runner-up to Lü Xiuzhi at the Chinese National Race Walking Grand Prix. She placed eighth at the 2017 World Championships in Athletics.

== International competitions ==
Year	Competition	Venue	Position	Event	Notes
2014	World Junior Championships	Eugene, United States	2nd	10,000 m walk	44:02.64
2017	Asian Race Walking Championships	Nomi, Japan	1st	20 km walk	1:30:51
2017	World Championships	London, United Kingdom	8th	20 km walk	1:29:26
