= Leyde Guerra =

Peruvian racewalker (born 1998)

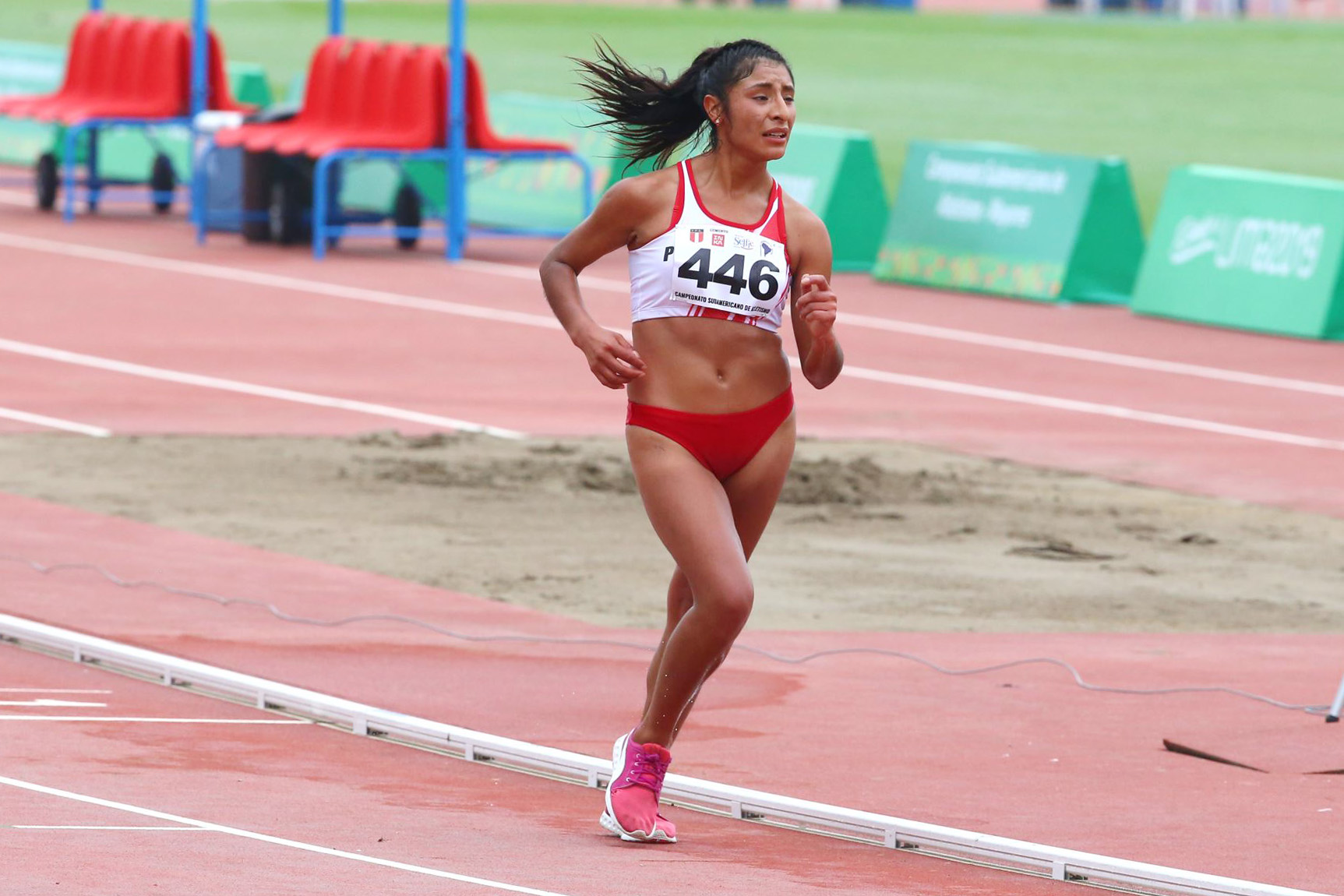

Personal information
- Full name: Leyde Jossy Guerra Mucha
- Born: 27 September 1998 (age 27)

Sport
- Country: Peru
- Sport: Athletics
- Event: Race walking
Medal record
Representing Peru
Women's athletics
South American Championships
Bronze medal – third place	2019 Lima	20,000 m walk
South American Race Walking Championships
Bronze medal – third place	2022 Lima	20 km walk
South American U23 Championships
Gold medal – first place	2018 Cuenca	20,000 m walk

Leyde Jossy Guerra Mucha (born 27 September 1998) is a Peruvian racewalker. In 2019, she competed in the women's 20 kilometres walk event at the 2019 World Athletics Championships held in Doha, Qatar. She did not finish her race.

In 2018, she won the gold medal in the women's 20 km walk at the 2018 South American Under-23 Championships in Athletics held in Cuenca, Ecuador.

In 2019, she won the bronze medal in the women's 20 km walk at the 2019 South American Championships in Athletics held in Lima, Peru.

She also competed in the women's 20 kilometres walk at the 2020 Summer Olympics held in Tokyo, Japan.
