= Pavel Chihuán =

Peruvian racewalker

Personal information
- Full name: Pavel Chihuán Camayo
- Born: 19 January 1986 (age 40)

Sport
- Country: Peru
- Sport: Track and field
- Event: racewalking
- Updated on 29 August 2015

Pavel Chihuán Camayo (born 19 January 1986) is a male Peruvian racewalker. He competed in the 20 kilometres walk event at the 2015 World Championships in Athletics in Beijing, China.

== See also ==
- Peru at the 2015 World Championships in Athletics
