= Eliška Drahotová =

Czech race walker and road cyclist

Personal information
- Full name: Eliška Drahotová
- Nationality: Czech
- Born: 22 July 1995 (age 30) Rumburk, Czech Republic

Sport
- Country: Czech Republic
- Sport: Athletics
- Event(s): race walking, middle-distance running, steeplechase, cyclist
- Club: USK Praha, TJ Cykloprag
- Coached by: Ivo Piták
Medal record
European Athletics Junior Championships
Bronze medal – third place	2013 Rieti	10,000 m walk

Eliška Drahotová (Czech pronunciation: [ˈɛlɪʃka ˈdraɦotovaː]; born 22 July 1995) is a Czech athletics competitor in race walking and road cycling, like her twin sister, Anežka. She won the bronze medal in the 2013 European Athletics Junior Championships, while her twin sister Anežka Drahotová took the gold. Her global debut in cycling also came that year at the 2013 UCI Road World Championships. There she placed 34th in the junior time trial.

She also competes in the running events: half-marathon, 3000 m, 2000 m, 1500 m, 800m, as well as in on other race walking distances, including the 20 km walk.
