= Viktoryia Rashchupkina =

Belarusian racewalker

Personal information
- Nationality: Belarusian
- Born: 23 May 1995 (age 31) Brest, Belarus

Sport
- Sport: Athletics
- Event: Racewalking

Viktoryia Andreyeuna Rashchupkina (Belarusian: Вікторыя Андрэеўна Рашчупкіна; born 23 May 1995) is a Belarusian racewalking athlete. She qualified to represent Belarus at the 2020 Summer Olympics in Tokyo 2021, competing in women's 20 kilometres walk.
