= Anežka Drahotová =

Czech athletics competitor

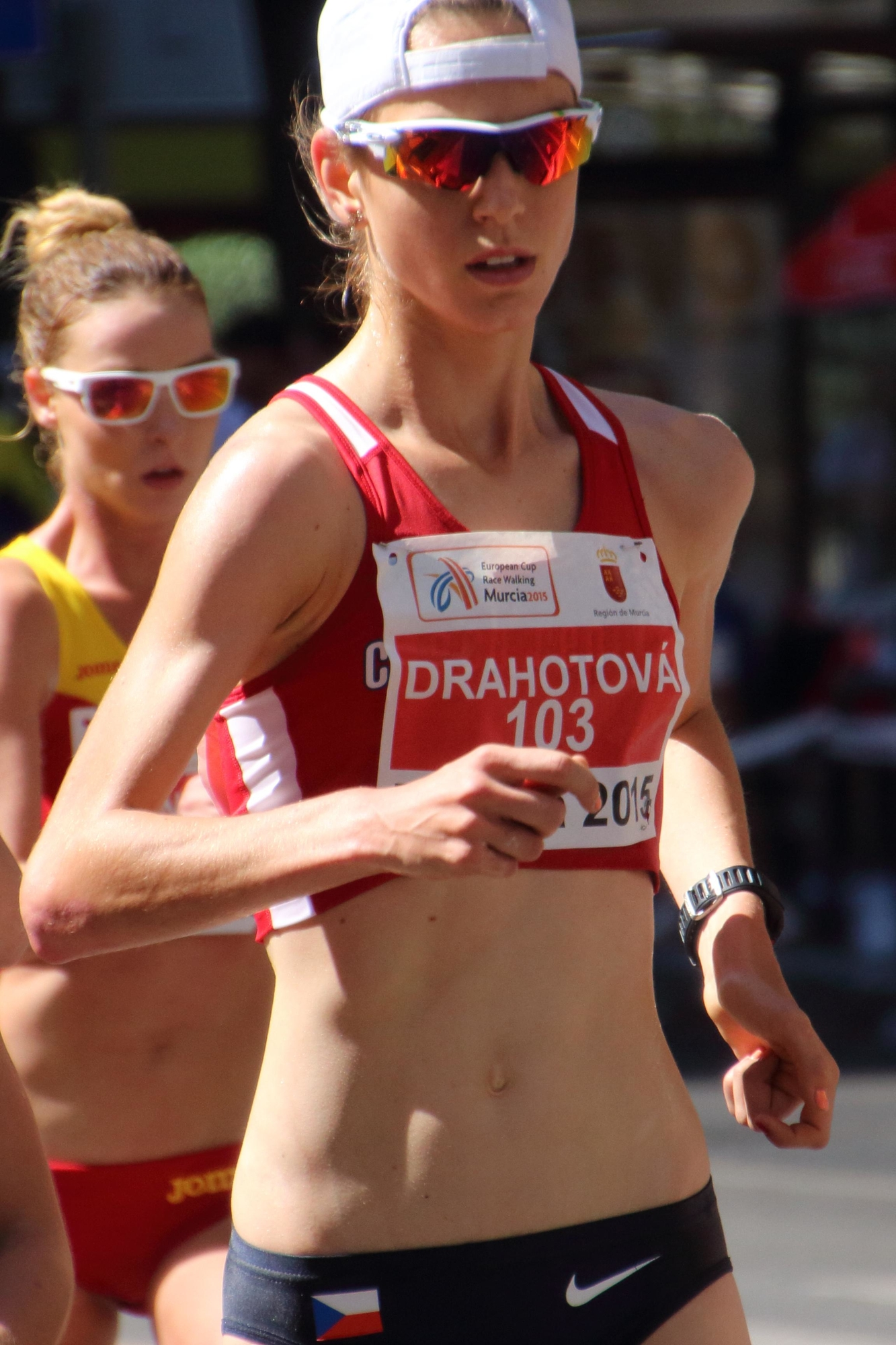
- Drahotová at the 2015 European Cup Race Walking

Personal information
- Full name: Anežka Drahotová
- Nationality: Czech
- Born: 22 July 1995 (age 30) Rumburk, Czech Republic
- Height: 1.80 m (5 ft 11 in)
- Weight: 57 kg (126 lb)

Sport
- Country: Czech Republic
- Sport: Athletics
- Events: race walking, middle-distance running, steeplechase, cyclist
- Club: USK Praha, CTP Šimůnek
- Coached by: Ivo Piták
Medal record
European Race Walking Cup
Bronze medal – third place	2011 Olhão	10 km team walk
European Race Walking Cup
Silver medal – second place	2013 Dudince	10 km walk
Silver medal – second place	2013 Dudince	10 km team walk
European Athletics Junior Championships
Gold medal – first place	2013 Rieti	10,000 m walk
IAAF World Race Walking Cup
Bronze medal – third place	2014 Taicang	10 km walk
European Athletics Championships
Bronze medal – third place	2014 Zurich	20 km walk
World Junior Championships
Gold medal – first place	2014 Oregon	10,000 m walk
European Athletics U23 Championships
Silver medal – second place	2015 Tallinn	20 km walk

Anežka Drahotová (Czech pronunciation: [ˈanɛʃka ˈdraɦotovaː]; born 22 July 1995) is a Czech former athletics competitor in race walking, middle-distance running, and steeplechase, as well an international-level cyclist. She is the Czech record holder for the 20 kilometres walk (1:29:05 – equal with Barbora Dibelková) and the 10 km track walk (44:15.87 minutes).

In her first major international competitions, she placed seventh in the junior category at the 2011 European Race Walking Cup and sixth in the 5000 m walk at the 2011 World Youth Championships in Athletics. The following year she ranked sixth in the 10 km walk at the 2012 World Junior Championships in Athletics, where she also placed 25th overall in the 1500 metres. The 2013 European Race Walking Cup saw her take the bronze medal in the 10 km walk event. She won the 20 km walk gold medal in the 2013 European Athletics Junior Championships, while her twin sister Eliška Drahotová took the bronze. In an unusual event combination, she also entered the 3000 metres steeplechase and placed ninth.

She placed outside the medals, taking seventh place, in the 2013 World Championships in Athletics held in Moscow in the 20 km walk despite leading the race for some kilometers and notching a personal best time of 1:29:05. She proved adept at running by finishing as the first Czech athlete at the Prague Grand Prix 10K run that year. Her global debut in cycling also came that year at the 2013 UCI Road World Championships. There she placed 19th in the junior road race. In 2013 her world ranking in the women's 20 km walk was 21st place overall.

She competed at the 2016 Summer Olympics in the women's 20 km walk event.

== Competition record in athletics ==
Year	Competition	Venue	Position	Event	Notes
Representing the Czech Republic
2011	European Race Walking Cup (U20)	Olhão, Portugal	7th	10 km walk	49:36
2011	European Race Walking Cup (U20)	Olhão, Portugal	3rd	Team - 10 km Junior	19 pts
2011	World Youth Championships	Villeneuve d'Ascq, France	6th	5000 m walk	22:32.87
2012	World Junior Championships	Barcelona, Spain	25th (h)	1500 m	4:26.77
2012	World Junior Championships	Barcelona, Spain	6th	10,000 m walk	46:29.95
2013	European Race Walking Cup (U20)	Dudince, Slovakia	2nd	10 km walk	46:29
2013	European Race Walking Cup (U20)	Dudince, Slovakia	2nd	Team - 10 km Junior	9 pts
2013	European Junior Championships	Rieti, Italy	1st	10,000 m walk	44:15.87
2013	World Championships	Moscow, Russia	7th	20 km walk	1:29:05
2014	World Race Walking Cup (U20)	Taicang, China	3rd	10 km walk	43:40
2014	World Junior Championships	Eugene, United States	—	3000 m steeplechase	DNS
2014	World Junior Championships	Eugene, United States	1st	10,000 m walk	42:47.25
2014	European Championships	Zurich, Switzerland	3rd	20 km walk	1:28:08
2015	European Race Walking Cup	Murcia, Spain	4th	20 km walk	1:26:53
2015	European U23 Championships	Tallinn, Estonia	12th	5000m	16:03.18
2015	European U23 Championships	Tallinn, Estonia	2nd	20 km walk	1:27:25
2015	World Championships	Beijing, China	8th	20 km walk	1:30:32
2017	European U23 Championships	Bydgoszcz, Poland	7th	20 km walk	1:34:51
2018	European Championships	Berlin, Germany	DQ	20 km walk	DQ
2019	Universiade	Naples, Italy	DQ	20 km walk	DQ

Awards
Preceded by Ester Ledecká	Czech Junior Athlete of the Year; 2014	Succeeded by Ester Ledecká; Jiří Janošek
