= Kate Veale (athlete) =

Irish racewalker

Personal information
- Nationality: Irish
- Born: 5 January 1994 (age 32) Waterford, Ireland

Sport
- Country: Ireland
- Sport: Track and field
- Event: Racewalking
- Club: West Waterford Athletics Club
- Coached by: Rob Heffernan
Medal record
Racewalking
Representing Ireland
World Championships
Gold medal – first place	2011 Lille	Girls' 5km race walk

Kate Veale (born 5 January 1994) is an Irish racewalker who competes in international level events. She was 2011 World Youth champion in the 5 kilometre race walk. She has multiple Irish titles. She won a bronze medal at the European cup junior 10 km. She competed in world university Games in 2019. She has also represented Ireland at the 2010 Summer Youth Olympics and finished fourth in the 5 kilometre race walk.
