= César Rodríguez (race walker) =

Peruvian racewalker

Personal information
- Full name: César Augusto Rodríguez Diburga
- Born: 26 June 1997 (age 29) Huancayo, Peru

Sport
- Sport: Men's athletics
- Event: Racewalking
Medal record
Men's athletics
Representing Peru
Pan American Games
Silver medal – second place	2023 Santiago	Mixed race walk
South American Games
Silver medal – second place	2018 Cochabamba	20 km walk
Silver medal – second place	2022 Asunción	35 km walk
Bolivarian Games
Gold medal – first place	2022 Valledupar	35 km walk

César Augusto Rodríguez Diburga (born 26 June 1997) is a Peruvian racewalking athlete. He represented Peru at the 2020 Summer Olympics in the men's 20 kilometres walk.

== Career ==
In February 2014, Rodríguez represented Peru at the 2014 South American Race Walking Championships in the youth 10 kilometres walk and won a silver medal. In August 2014, he represented Peru at the 2014 Summer Youth Olympics and was the flag bearer at the opening ceremony. He competed in the 10 kilometre walk and finished in fourth place with a time of 42:26.49. He then won a gold medal at the 2015 Pan American Junior Athletics Championships in the 10 kilometres walk.

Rodríguez represented Peru at the 2018 South American Games in the 20 kilometers walk and finished with a time of 1:26:23 to win a silver medal.

He represented Peru at the 2020 Summer Olympics in the men's 20 kilometres walk and finished in 21st place.
