= Kimberly García =

Peruvian racewalker (born 1993)

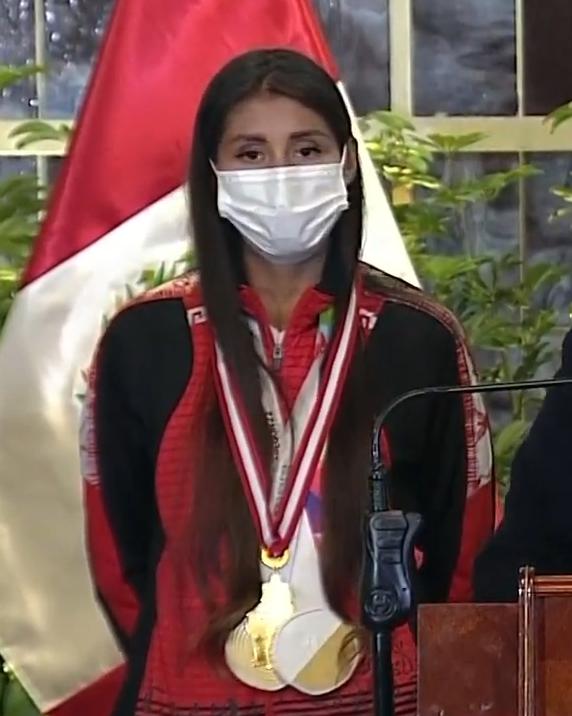

Personal information
- Full name: Gabriela Kimberly García León
- Nickname: Kimy
- Born: 19 October 1993 (age 32) Huancayo, Peru
- Education: Universidad Continental
- Height: 1.64 m (5 ft 5 in)

Sport
- Country: Peru
- Sport: Athletics
- Event: Race walking
- Coached by: Andrés Chocho (2022–); Pedro Cañizares (–2021)
Medal record
Representing Peru
Women's athletics
Event	1st	2nd	3rd
World Championships	2	1	0
World Team Championships	2	1	1
Pan American Games	1	2	0
Pan American Cup	2	2	0
Ibero-American Championships	1	2	1
South American Games	1	0	0
South American Race Walking Championships	1	1	1
Bolivarian Games	1	1	1
South American U18 Championships	1	1	0
Total	12	11	4
World Championships
Gold medal – first place	2022 Eugene	20 km walk
Gold medal – first place	2022 Eugene	35 km walk
Silver medal – second place	2023 Budapest	35 km walk
World Team Championships
Gold medal – first place	2024 Antalya	20 km walk
Gold medal – first place	2026 Brasília	Half marathon walk
Silver medal – second place	2024 Antalya	20 km walk (team)
Bronze medal – third place	2022 Muscat	20 km walk
Pan American Games
Gold medal – first place	2023 Santiago	20 km walk
Silver medal – second place	2019 Lima	20 km walk
Silver medal – second place	2023 Santiago	Marathon walk relay
Pan American Cup
Gold medal – first place	2013 Guatemala City	20 km walk
Gold medal – first place	2019 Lázaro Cárdenas	20 km walk
Silver medal – second place	2015 Arica	20 km walk
Silver medal – second place	2017 Lima	20 km walk
Ibero-American Championships
Gold medal – first place	2026 Lima	10,000 m walk
Silver medal – second place	2018 Trujillo	10,000 m walk
Silver medal – second place	2022 Alicante	10,000 m walk
Bronze medal – third place	2014 São Paulo	10,000 m walk
South American Games
Gold medal – first place	2018 Cochabamba	20 km walk
South American Race Walking Championships
Gold medal – first place	2014 Cochabamba	20 km walk
Silver medal – second place	2022 Lima	20 km walk
Bronze medal – third place	2018 Sucúa	20 km walk
Bolivarian Games
Gold medal – first place	2025 Lima-Ayacucho	Half marathon walk
Silver medal – second place	2017 Santa Marta	20 km walk
Bronze medal – third place	2013 Trujillo	20 km walk
South American U18 Championships
Gold medal – first place	2008 Lima	5000 m walk
Silver medal – second place	2010 Santiago	5000 m walk

Gabriela Kimberly García León (born 19 October 1993) is a female racewalker from Peru. She won gold medals in the 20 kilometres walk and 35 km walk at the 2022 World Athletics Championships, becoming the first ever Peruvian world medallist and the first Latin American to earn two titles at the same World Athletics Championships. García is the South American record holder for the longer event.

She represented Peru in the women's 20 kilometres walk at the 2016 Rio and 2020 Tokyo Olympics. She also holds three Peruvian national records (10,000 m walk, 10 km walk and 20 km walk).

== Early life ==
Kimberly García comes from the Inca nation and was born in Huancayo in central Peru. Her family has always been linked to race walking, so she started training when she was 5 years old, following in the footsteps of her cousin.

== Career ==
As a 12-year-old García won the 5 kilometres race walk at the Peruvian Race Walking Under-18 Championships and Peruvian U18 Championships. Three years later, in 2009, she took victory in the 10 km walk U20 event of the Peruvian Race Walking Championships. She was seventh at the 2010 Youth Olympic Games held in Singapore (5000 m walk).

At 19, she claimed the gold medal in the 20 km walk at the 2013 Pan American Race Walking Cup. García won also the event at the 2014 South American Race Walking Championships. In May that year, she set her first South American record (20 km) in Taicang, China. García placed 14th in the event at the 2016 Rio Olympics. After the Games, she considered retiring from professional athletics due to the lack of support from private companies.

In 2017, she achieved the highest position of Peruvian athlete in a World Athletics Championships, finishing seventh in the 20 km walk at the Championships in London.

In 2019, García won the silver medal in the event at the Pan American Games staged in Lima. In December that year, she was named Athlete of the Year by the Peruvian Athletics Sport Federation.

She qualified for the event but failed to finish the 20 km walk at the postponed 2020 Tokyo Olympics.

=== 2022: Double world champion in Oregon ===
In March, the 28-year-old finished third in the 20 km walk at the World Race Walking Team Championships held in Muscat, Oman. In April, she broke the South American record in the 35 km walk with a time of 2:43:19 for second at the Dudinská Päťdesiatka meeting in Dudince, Slovakia.

At the World Athletics Championships held in Eugene, Oregon in July, García first won 20 km walk in a national record, becoming the first ever medallist from Peru in championships history and ending longer than 10 years Chinese dominance in the event. Seven days later, she added second title for the 35 km walk, improving her own South American record and becoming the first woman to earn two racewalking titles at one global championships. García also became the first Latin American to win two gold medals at the same World Athletics Championships. In November, she was shortlisted for the World Athletics Female Athlete of the Year award.

=== 2023–present: 35 km walk world record ===
Kimberly got her 2023 campaign off to a strong start on 25 March, setting a 35 km walk world record with a time of 2:37:44 at the Dudinska 50. She made clear that 2022 was no flash in the pan and sliced two seconds off the previous fastest mark for the distance. It was the first world record in the event after it became a standard championship discipline in 2022 and 2:38:00 was set as the standard. In August, Kimberly won the silver medal in the 35 km athletic walk at the World Championships in Budapest.

== Personal bests ==
Event	Result	Venue	Date
Track walk
5,000 m	22:57.4 min	Lima, Peru	14 May 2011
10,000 m	42:45.06 min NR	Lima, Peru	30 May 2026
Road walk
5 km	24:24 min	Cochabamba, Bolivia	6 March 2010
10 km	43:23 min NR	Suzhou, China	25 September 2017
20 km	1:26:22 hrs NR	Tokyo, Japan	20 September 2025
35 km	2:37:44 hrs AR	Dudince, Slovakia	25 March 2023
Half marathon walk	1:31:44 hrs AR	Poděbrady, Czech Republic	8 May 2026

== International competitions ==
Representing Peru
Year	Competition	Venue	Position	Event	Result	Notes
2009	World Youth Championships	Brixen, Italy	–	5000 m walk	DQ	
2010	South American U18 Race Walking Championships	Cochabamba, Bolivia	1st	5 km walk	24:24	
2010	World Race Walking Cup, U20 events	Chihuahua City, Mexico	22nd	10 km walk	54:02	
2010	Youth Olympic Games	Bishan, Singapore	7th	5000 m walk	23:17.04	PB
2010	South American Youth Championships	Santiago, Chile	2nd	5000 m walk	23:25.76	
2011	Pan American Race Walking Cup, U20 events	Barcelona, Spain	2nd	10 km walk	49:13	
2011	South American U20 Championships in Athletics	Medellín, Colombia	–	10,000 m walk	DQ	
2012	South American Race Walking Championships, U20 events	Salinas, Ecuador	4th	10 km walk	47:57	
2012	World Race Walking Cup, U20 events	Saransk, Russia	11th	10 km walk	47:56	SB
2012	World Junior Championships	Barcelona, Spain	10th	10,000 m walk	47:42.49	SB
2013	Pan American Race Walking Cup	Guatemala City, Guatemala	1st	20 km walk	1:35:01	
2013	South American Race Walking Championships	Cartagena, Colombia	–	20,000 m walk	DQ	
2013	World Championships	Beijing, China	31st	20 km walk	1:33:57	NR
2013	Bolivarian Games	Trujillo, Peru	3rd	20 km walk	1:34:29	
2014	South American Race Walking Championships	Cochabamba, Bolivia	1st	20 km walk	1:35:34	
2014	World Race Walking Cup	Taicang, China	24th	20 km walk	1:29:44	AR
2014	Ibero-American Championships	São Paulo, Brazil	3rd	10,000 m walk	43:57.44	
2015	Pan American Race Walking Cup	Arica, Chile	2nd	20 km walk	1:31:13	
2015	South American Race Walking Championships	Lima, Peru	–	20,000 m walk	DQ	
2015	Pan American Games	Toronto, Canada	5th	20 km walk	1:32:45	
2015	World Championships	Beijing, China	–	20 km walk	DNF	
2016	South American Race Walking Championships	Guayaquil, Ecuador	8th	20 km walk	1:38:21	
2016	World Race Walking Team Championships	Rome, Italy	12th	20 km walk	1:29:38	NR
2016	Olympic Games	Rio de Janeiro, Brazil	14th	20 km walk	1:32:09	
2017	Pan American Cup	Lima, Peru	2nd	20 km walk	1:29:15	
2017	World Championships	London, United Kingdom	7th	20 km walk	1:29:13	NR
2017	Bolivarian Games	Santa Marta, Colombia	2nd	20 km walk	1:33:07	
2018	South American Race Walking Championships	Sucúa, Ecuador	3rd	20 km walk	1:32:48	
2018	World Team Championships	Taicang, China	8th	20 km walk	1:28:56	NR
2018	World Team Championships	Taicang, China	13th	20 km walk (team)	151 pts	
2018	South American Games	Cochabamba, Bolivia	1st	20 km walk	1:33:11	GR
2018	Ibero-American Championships	Trujillo, Peru	2nd	10,000 m walk	42:56.97	NR
2019	Pan American Cup	Lázaro Cárdenas, Mexico	1st	20 km walk	1:29:33	
2019	Pan American Games	Lima, Peru	2nd	20 km walk	1:29:00	SB
2021	Olympic Games	Sapporo, Japan	—N/a	20 km walk	DNF	
2022	South American Race Walking Championships	Lima, Peru	2nd	20 km walk	1:32:00	
2022	World Team Championships	Muscat, Oman	3rd	20 km walk	1:32:27	
2022	Ibero-American Championships	La Nucia, Spain	2nd	10,000 m walk	43:41.50	
2022	World Championships	Eugene, OR, United States	1st	20 km walk	1:26:58	NR
2022	World Championships	Eugene, OR, United States	1st	35 km walk	2:39:16	CR, AR
2023	World Championships	Budapest, Hungary	4th	20 km walk	1:27:32	
2023	World Championships	Budapest, Hungary	2nd	35 km walk	2:40:52	
2023	Pan American Games	Santiago, Chile	1st	20 km walk		
2023	Pan American Games	Santiago, Chile	2nd	Marathon walk relay	3:01:14	
2024	World Team Championships	Antalya, Turkey	1st	20 km walk	1:27:12	
2024	World Team Championships	Antalya, Turkey	2nd	20 km walk (team)	15 pts	
2024	Olympic Games	Paris, France	16th	20 km walk	1:30:10	
2024	Olympic Games	Paris, France	4th	Marathon walk relay	2:51:56	
2025	World Championships	Tokyo, Japan	5th	20 km walk	1:26:22	NR
2025	World Championships	Tokyo, Japan	10th	35 km walk	2:50:37	
2025	Bolivarian Games	Lima, Peru	1st	Half marathon walk	1:35:10	GR, NR
2026	World Team Championships	Brasília, Brazil	1st	Half marathon walk	1:35:00	CR
2026	World Team Championships	Brasília, Brazil	4th	Half marathon walk (team)	37 pts	
2026	Ibero-American Championships	Lima, Peru	1st	10,000 m walk	42:45.06	NR

== See also ==
- Peru at the 2015 World Championships in Athletics
- Peru at the 2022 World Athletics Championships
