= Peruvian Athletics Sport Federation =

Governing body for athletics in Peru

- Sport: Athletics
- Jurisdiction: Federation
- Abbreviation: FDPA
- Founded: February 15, 1927
- Affiliation: IAAF
- Regional affiliation: CONSUDATLE
- Affiliation date: 1925
- Headquarters: San Luis, Lima
- President: Óscar Fernández
- Vice president(s): José Ramos Pancca
- Secretary: Giorgio Battuello
- Replaced: Federación Atlética Peruana
- (founded): November 22, 1918

Official website
- www.fedepeatle.org
- (Peru)

The Peruvian Athletics Sport Federation (Spanish: Federación Deportiva Peruana de Atletismo, FDPA) is the governing body for the sport of athletics in Peru.

== History ==
FDPA was founded on November 22, 1918 as Federación Atlética Peruana. First president was Alfredo Benavides Canseco. It joined CONSUDATLE in 1925, and Peru's first international appearance was at the IV South American Championships in Montevideo, Uruguay. Later that year, the Peruvian Olympic Committee (Comité Olímpico Peruano) installed a commission for the integration of the sport of athletics. The process resulted in the foundation of the Federación Peruana de Atletismo on February 15, 1927, with president Pedro Villanueva.

After the resignation of Enrique Cusicanqui in 2011, former vice-president Jorge Julián came into office. In December 2012, Miguel Ignacio Mendo was elected president for the period 2013–2016. However, the result was not recognized, and a new election was scheduled, where ex-sprinter Óscar Fernández was nominated and confirmed as new president.

== Affiliations ==
FDPA is the national member federation for Peru in the following international organisations:

- International Association of Athletics Federations (IAAF)
- Confederación Sudamericana de Atletismo (CONSUDATLE; South American Athletics Confederation)
- Association of Panamerican Athletics (APA)
- Asociación Iberoamericana de Atletismo (AIA; Ibero-American Athletics Association)

Moreover, it is part of the following national organisations:

- Peruvian Olympic Committee (Spanish: Comité Olímpico Peruano)

== Members ==
FDPA comprises the regional ligas and/or athletics clubs of Peru.

== National records ==
FDPA maintains the Peruvian records in athletics.
