= Luis Henry Campos =

Peruvian racewalker (born 1995)

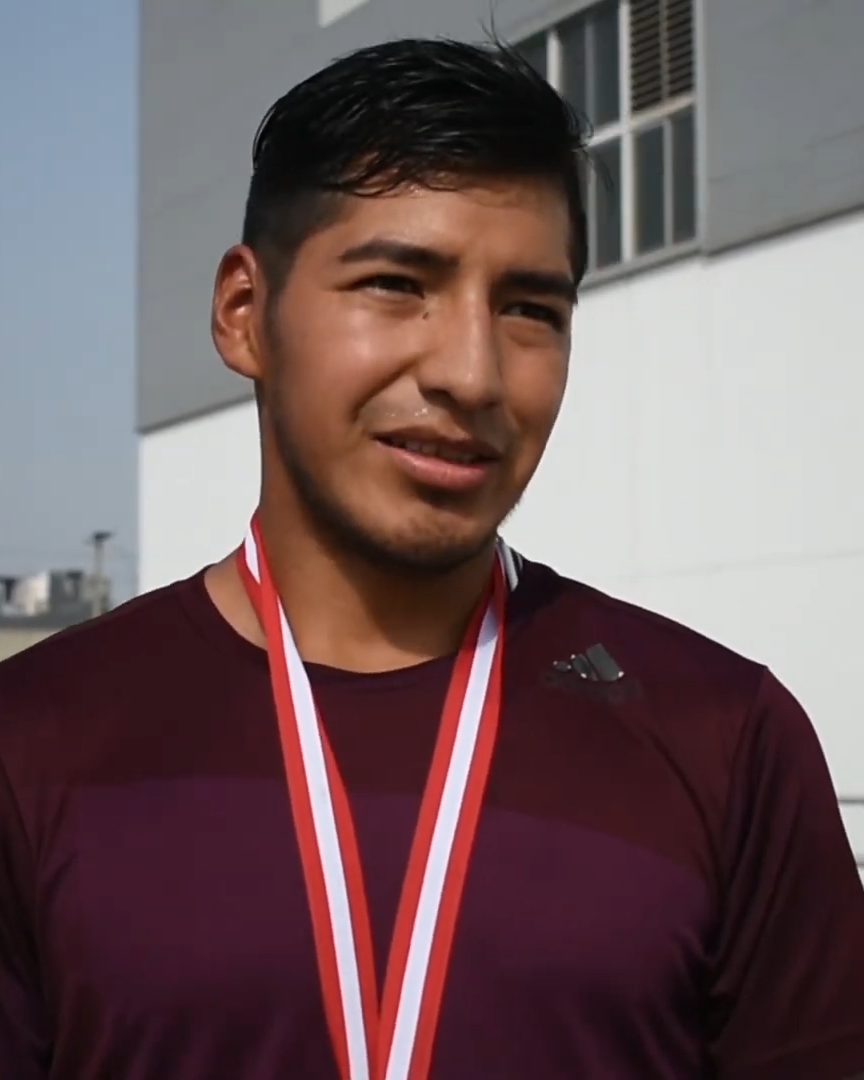

Personal information
- Born: 10 November 1995 (age 30)

Sport
- Country: Peru
- Sport: Athletics
- Event: Race walking
Medal record
Representing Peru
Men's athletics
Ibero-American Championships
| Bronze medal – third place | 2024 Cuiabá | 20 km walk |
South American Championships
| Gold medal – first place | 2023 Sao Paulo | 20,000 m walk |
| Gold medal – first place | 2025 Mar del Plata | 20 km walk |
| Bronze medal – third place | 2019 Lima | 20,000 m walk |
South American Games
| Silver medal – second place | 2018 Cochabamba | 50 km walk |
South American Race Walking Championships
| Gold medal – first place | 2022 Lima | 35 km walk |
Bolivarian Games
| Silver medal – second place | 2025 Lima-Ayacucho | Half marathon walk |
| Silver medal – second place | 2025 Lima-Ayacucho | Marathon walk |
| Bronze medal – third place | 2022 Valledupar | 35 km walk |

Luis Henry Campos Cruz (born 10 November 1995) is a Peruvian racewalker. He competed at the 2016 Summer Olympics in the men's 50 kilometres walk but did not finish the race. In 2019, he competed in the men's 20 kilometres walk at the 2019 World Athletics Championships held in Doha, Qatar. He finished in 29th place.

In 2023, he won a gold medal at the 2023 South American Championships in the 20,000 metres walk.

Campos was born in Cusco.
