= Ahmed Jaziri =

Tunisian steeplechaser (born 1997)

Personal information
- Native name: Arabic: أحمد الجزيري
- Nationality: Tunisia
- Born: 16 December 1997 (age 28) Kairouan, Tunisia
- Education: Ibn Sharaf Institute; Eastern Kentucky University
- Height: 175 cm (5 ft 9 in)
- Weight: 60 kg (132 lb)

Sport
- Sport: Sport of athletics
- Event: 3000 metres steeplechase
- College team: Eastern Kentucky Colonels
- Club: Municipal Athletics Club of Kairouan; Under Armour Baltimore Distance
- Coached by: Cory Erdmann

Achievements and titles
- National finals: 2016 Tunisian Champs; • 5000m, 1st (gold); 2019 Tunisian Champs; • 1500m, 1st (gold); 2019 Algerian Champs; • 3000m s'chase, 3rd (bronze); 2021 NCAA Indoors; • 3000m, 6th; 2021 NCAA XC; • 10km XC, 71st; 2021 NCAAs; • 3000m s'chase, 10th; 2022 NCAAs; • 3000m s'chase, 1st (gold)
- Personal bests: Mile: 3:59.91 sh NR (2024); 3000m: 7:41.05 sh NR (2024); 3000mSC: 8:14.93 (2023); 5000m: 13:24.18 sh NR (2024)
Medal record
Men's athletics
Representing Tunisia
Mediterranean U23 Championships
Bronze medal – third place	2018 Jesolo	5000 m
- Updated on 4 April 2024

Ahmed Jaziri (Arabic: أحمد الجزيري; born 16 December 1997) is a Tunisian steeplechase runner specializing in the 3000 metres steeplechase. He won the 2022 NCAA Division I Outdoor Track and Field Championships steeplechase, becoming the first Eastern Kentucky Colonels individual track and field champion. He is the current Tunisian record holder in the short track mile run, 3000 metres, and 5000 metres.

== Career ==
As a child, Jaziri started as a footballer. He won his first ever race, a 1.5-mile cross country competition, with no training, prompting him to switch to running competitively. He competed in U18-level competitions as early as 2014, and in 2016 he won the Tunisian Championships and first represented his country at the 2016 Mediterranean Athletics U23 Championships, finishing 7th in the 5000 metres final. Jaziri also ran the 5000 m at the 2017 Arab Athletics Championships, finishing 6th.

In 2018, Jaziri won the bronze medal at the 2018 Mediterranean Athletics U23 Championships in the 5000 metres. Although he was still studying in Tunisia, the Eastern Kentucky Colonels track and field coaches watched this race and offered him a second bachelor's degree in the United States if he ran for the Colonels, which he accepted. Jaziri won his second Tunisian championship in 2019, this time in the 1500 m, as well as placing 3rd in the Algerian Athletics Championships running as a foreign national in the steeplechase.

Jaziri finished 6th in his first NCAA national final at the 2021 NCAA indoor 3000 m. In April 2021, Jaziri set a personal best of 8:23:14 in the steeplechase, barely missing the 8:22.00 automatic qualifying standard for the 2020 Summer Olympics. He would finish 71st at the 2021 NCAA Division I Cross Country Championships and 10th in his first outdoor NCAA steeplechase final later that year.

Jaziri qualified for his first world championship in 2022, representing Tunisia at the 2022 World Athletics Indoor Championships and finishing 9th in his 3000 m heat. In June 2022, Jaziri won his first NCAA steeplechase title at the 2022 NCAA Division I Outdoor Track and Field Championships. His winning time of 8:18.70 was the second-fastest 3000 metres steeplechase in NCAA Championships history, only behind Henry Rono who broke the world record in 1978. This qualified him for the 2022 Mediterranean Athletics U23 Championships and the 2022 World Athletics Championships. At the Mediterranean Championships, Jaziri finished 4th, and he finished 10th in his first outdoor world championship steeplechase final.

Running as a professional in 2023, Jaziri won the inaugural Los Angeles Grand Prix and set a steeplechase personal best of 8:15.35 at a small New Jersey meet, qualifying him for the 2023 World Athletics Championships. At those world championships, he qualified for the final again and finished 10th.

In 2024, Jaziri set Tunisian records in the short track Mile run, 3000 metres, and 5000 metres, all run on the Boston University track.

== Personal life ==
Jaziri was born in Radès, Tunisia. At Ibn Sharaf Institute, he earned his first bachelor's degree in physical education, and after moving to Eastern Kentucky University he earned a second degree in sports management, with a master's in safety and security management. In December 2022, Jaziri turned professional with Under Armour's Mission Run Baltimore, the East Coast wing of the Dark Sky Distance group also sponsored by Under Armour.

English is Jaziri's third language, behind Arabic and French. Outside of athletics, he participates in bowling.

== Statistics ==
=== Personal best progression ===
3000m Steeplechase progression
#	Mark	Pl.	Competition	Venue	Date	Ref.
1	8:36.05	(gold) (Round B)	Guldendensporenmeeting	Kortrijk, Belgium	12 Jul 2019	
2	8:35.16	5th	Brussels Grand Prix	Bruxelles, Belgium	22 Aug 2019	
3	8:32.92	1st place, gold medalist(s)	Kansas City Qualifier	Leavenworth, KS	30 Apr 2021	
4	8:24.33	1st place, gold medalist(s)	Payton Jordan Invitational	Stanford, CA	28 Apr 2022	
5	8:18.70	1st place, gold medalist(s)	NCAA Division I Men's Outdoor Track and Field Championships	Eugene, OR	9 Jun 2022	
6	8:17.64	1st place, gold medalist(s)	USATF LA Grand Prix	Westwood, CA	25 May 2023	
7	8:15.35	1st place, gold medalist(s)	The Elliott Denman Nj International Track & Field Meet	West Long Branch, NJ	16 Jun 2023	
8	8:14.93	1st place, gold medalist(s)	Memorial Boris Hanžeković	Zagreb, Croatia	9 Sep 2023	
