= List of Tunisian records in athletics =

The following are the national records in athletics in Tunisia maintained by Tunisia's national athletics federation: Fédération Tunisienne d'Athlétisme (FTA).

== Outdoor ==
Key to tables: Awaiting ratification Record not kept by FTA Not ratified or later rescinded by FTA

=== Men ===
Event	Record	Athlete	Date	Meet	Place	Ref.
100 m	10.38 (+0.6 m/s)	Badreddine Toumi	25 July 2015		Nuremberg, Germany	
200 m	21.14 (+1.6 m/s)	Ridha Ghali	9 July 2005	National Championships	Radès, Tunisia	
200 m	21.11 NWI	Sofiane Labidi	3 August 1999		Jablonec, Czech Republic	
300 m	32.53	Sofiane Labidi	17 August 2001		Namur, Belgium	
400 m	45.19	Sofiane Labidi	5 June 2004	Meeting de Atletismo Sevilla	Seville, Spain	
800 m	1:44.55	Abdessalem Ayouni	20 August 2025	Internationales Abendsportfest	Pfungstadt, Germany	
1000 m	2:16.71	Ali Hakimi	30 July 1999	DN Galan	Stockholm, Sweden	
1500 m	3:31.70	Ali Hakimi	22 August 1997	Memorial Van Damme	Brussels, Belgium	
Mile	3:50.57	Ali Hakimi	26 August 1997	ISTAF	Berlin, Germany	
2000 m	4:54.54	Ali Hakimi	10 July 1996		Nice, France	
3000 m	7:37.56	Mohamed Amin Jhinaoui	5 May 2023	Doha Diamond League	Doha, Qatar	
Two miles	8:32.34	Féthi Baccouche	13 July 1986		Formia, Italy	
5000 m	13:13.94	Féthi Baccouche	4 July 1987	Bislett Games	Oslo, Norway	
10,000 m	27:54.69	Mohammed Gammoudi	31 August 1972	Olympic Games	Munich, West Germany	
10 km (road)	28:43	Ridha El Amri	25 April 2004	Würzburger Residenzlauf	Würzburg, Germany	
15 km (road)	45:21	Ridha Chihaoui	1 May 2009	Festa del Podista	Prato, Italy	
15,000 m (track)	46:34.8	Amor Lassoued	7 March 1970		Tunis, Tunisia	
10 miles (road)	47:47	Mohamed Salah Rajhi	27 June 1987	Nacht von Borgholzhausen	Borgholzhausen, West Germany	
One hour	19284 m	Ali Khamassi	1 May 1967		Rome, Italy	
20,000 m (track)	1:03:15.6	Sghaier Hamdouni	7 March 1970		Tunis, Tunisia	
Half marathon	1:01:53	Rached Amor	17 April 2005	Maratonina Di Brugnera	Brugnera, Italy	
25,000 m (track)	1:29:41.6	Ahmed Labidi	31 July 1959		Tunis, Tunisia	
Marathon	2:12:36	Tahar Mansouri	14 January 1996	Marrakech Marathon	Marrakesh, Morocco	
110 m hurdles	13.76 (+0.3 m/s)	Aymen Ben Ahmed	30 June 2007	Meeting d'Athlétisme de Radès	Radès, Tunisia	
400 m hurdles	48.75	Mohamed Adoini	16 May 2026	SEC Championships	Auburn, United States	
2000 m steeplechase	5:21.13	Lotfi Turki	27 August 2000		Padua, Italy	
3000 m steeplechase	8:07.73	Mohamed Amin Jhinaoui	7 August 2024	Olympic Games	Paris, France	
High jump	2.15 m	Belhassen Chikhaoui	12 July 1995		Aubervilliers, France	
Pole vault	5.40 m	Mohamed Romdhana	18 June 2017		Radès, Tunisia	
Long jump	8.01 m (−0.3 m/s)	Anis Gallali	22 August 1998	African Championships	Dakar, Senegal	
Triple jump	16.76 m (+1.3 m/s)	Mohamed Karim Sassi	8 July 1995		Limoges, France	
Shot put	18.51 m	Mohamed Meddeb	8 July 2006	National Championships	Radès, Tunisia	
Discus throw	56.32 m	Abderrazak Ben Hassine	26 May 1981		Algiers, Algeria	
Hammer throw	72.66 m	Saber Souid	12 August 2006	African Championships	Bambous, Mauritius	
Javelin throw	77.98 m	Maher Ridane	20 May 1995		Tunis, Tunisia	
Decathlon	8023 pts	Hamdi Dhouibi	9–10 August 2005	World Championships	Helsinki, Finland	
Decathlon	100m / Long jump / Shot put / High jump / 400m / 110m H / Discus / Pole vault / Javelin / 1500m; 10.67 (+3.2 m/s) / 7.43 m (+0.5 m/s) / 12.85 m / 1.94 m / 47.04 / 14.56 (−1.9 m/s) / 41.17 m / 4.80 m / 52.83 m / 4:31.24					
3000 m walk (track)	11:26.34	Hatem Ghoula	2 July 2011	Cork City Sports	Cork, Ireland	
5000 m walk (track)	18:05.49	Hatem Ghoula	1 May 1997		Tunis, Tunisia	
10,000 m walk (track)	38:24.31	Hatem Ghoula	30 May 1998		Tunis, Tunisia	
10 km walk (road)	38:12	Hatem Ghoula	28 May 2000		Sesto San Giovanni, Italy	
15,000 m walk (track)	1:11:54.53	Moncef Fatnassi	5 March 2000		Tunis, Tunisia	
20,000 m walk (track)	1:22:51.84	Hatem Ghoula	8 September 1994		Leutkirch, Germany	
20 km walk (road)	1:19:02	Hatem Ghoula	10 May 1997	Oder-Neisse Grand Prix	Eisenhüttenstadt, Germany	
30,000 m walk (track)	2:19:21.31	Hatem Ghoula	12 March 2011		Reims, France	
50 km walk (road)	3:58:44	Hatem Ghoula	4 March 2007	Spanish Race Walking Championships	Santa Eularia des Riu, Spain	
4 × 100 m relay	41.1 h	Tunisia; M. Belkhodja; A. Rouine; H. El Fray; S. Gadri	15 October 1971	Mediterranean Games	İzmir, Turkey	
4 × 400 m relay	3:05.19	Tunisia; Ridha Ghali; Titi El Aroussi; Kamel Tabbal; Sofiane Labidi	18 June 2005		Rabat, Morocco	
4 × 800 m relay	7:48.4	Club Sportif Garde Nationale	13 May 1994		Tunis, Tunisia	
4 × 1500 m relay	15:25.4	Tunisia	31 May 1975		Bourges, France	

=== Women ===
Event	Record	Athlete	Date	Meet	Place	Ref.
100 m	11.68 (+1.0 m/s)	Awatef Hamrouni	8 June 2000	African Championships	Algiers, Algeria	
200 m	23.95 (+0.4 m/s)	Awatef Ben Hassine	27 July 2002		Ninove, Belgium	
300 m	37.97	Awatef Ben Hassine	14 June 2003		Woluwe-Saint-Lambert, Belgium	
400 m	52.22	Awatef Ben Hassine	8 August 2002	African Championships	Radès, Tunisia	
400 m	51.66	Awatef Ben Hassine	24 June 2004	Meeting International Sonatrach	Algiers, Algeria	
800 m	2:00.70	Abir Nakhli	26 July 2002		Namur, Belgium	
1500 m	4:03.51	Marwa Bouzayani	9 August 2025	IFAM Oordegem	Oordegem, Belgium	
Mile	4:41.98	Abir Nakhli	15 June 2003	Meeting du Nord	Lille, France	
3000 m	8:52.06 (Note: Outdoor best; indoor mark ratified as absolute record.)	Habiba Ghribi	28 April 2013		Franconville, France	
5000 m	15:29.14 (Note: Outdoor best; indoor mark ratified as absolute record.)	Marwa Bouzayani	8 June 2024	Tunisian Championships	Radès, Tunisia	
10,000 m	33:12.98	Soulef Bouguerra	9 August 2003		Bucharest, Romania	
10 km (road)	31:17	Marwa Bouzayani	12 January 2025	10K Valencia Ibercaja	Valencia, Spain	
15 km (road)	53:50+ Wo	Soumaya Boussaïd	24 March 2018	World Half Marathon Championships	Valencia, Spain	
20 km (road)	1:11:34+ Wo	Soumaya Boussaïd	24 March 2018	World Half Marathon Championships	Valencia, Spain	
Half marathon	1:15:11 Wo	Soumaya Boussaïd	24 March 2018	World Half Marathon Championships	Valencia, Spain	
25 km (road)	1:34:03+	Amira Ben Amor	5 August 2012	Olympic Games	London, United Kingdom	
30 km (road)	1:53:05+	Amira Ben Amor	5 August 2012	Olympic Games	London, United Kingdom	
Marathon	2:40:13	Amira Ben Amor	5 August 2012	Olympic Games	London, United Kingdom	
100 m hurdles	14.26 (+2.0 m/s)	Samar Ezzina	13 June 2015	Meeting Interrégional	Carcassonne, France	
400 m hurdles	57.69	Hend Kabaoui	28 July 1995		Lindau, Germany	
2000 m steeplechase	6:04.05	Marwa Bouzayani	12 May 2023	Meeting National	Toulon, France	
3000 m steeplechase	8:58.09	Marwa Bouzayani	16 May 2026	Shanghai Diamond League	Shaoxing/Keqiao, China	
3000 m steeplechase	8:54.32	Marwa Bouzayani	4 July 2026	Prefontaine Classic	Eugene, United States	
High jump	1.78 m	Kawther Akrémi	16 July 1983		Casablanca, Morocco	
High jump	1.78 m	Karima Benothman	8 July 2007	Meeting d'Athlétisme de Radès	Radès, Tunisia	
Pole vault	4.31 m	Dorra Mahfoudhi	27 August 2019	African Games	Rabat, Morocco	
Long jump	6.21 m (+1.7 m/s)	Awatef Hamrouni	12 June 2005		Tunis, Tunisia	
Triple jump	13.08 m (+0.1 m/s)	Monia Jelassi	6 May 2000		Dakar, Senegal	
Shot put	16.75 m (Note: 16.72 m by World Athletics Statistic Handbook 2019)	Amel Benkhaled	11 June 2002		Jablonec, Czech Republic	
Discus throw	61.40 m (Note: 61.74 m by World Athletics Statistic Handbook 2019)	Monia Kari	1 May 1996		Algiers, Algeria	
Hammer throw	65.93 m	Sarah Bensaad	27 April 2014		Bobigny, France	
Javelin throw	60.87 m	Aïda Sellam	23 June 2004		Tunis, Tunisia	
Heptathlon	5686 pts	Nada Chroudi	27–28 April 2018	Multistars	Florence, Italia	
Heptathlon	100m H / High jump / Shot put / 200m / Long jump / Javelin / 800m; 14.58 (+0.4 m/s) / 1.66 m / 13.96 m / 25.91 (+1.7 m/s) / 5.84 m (+0.6 m/s) / 45.04 m / 2:20.18					
3000 m walk (track)	12:53.97	Chahinez Nasri	20 May 2018	French Club Championships	Reims, France	
5000 m walk (track)	20:50.03	Chahinez Nasri	23 March 2021		Radès, Tunisia	
10,000 m walk (track)	45:14.91	Chahinez Nasri	3 December 2017	Balma Racewalks	Balma, France	
10 km walk (road)	45:02	Chahinez Nasri	28 May 2016	XXX Gran Premio Cantones	A Coruña, Spain	
20 km walk (road)	1:32:20	Chahinez Nasri	5 May 2018	IAAF World Race Walking Team Championships	Taicang, China	
50 km walk (road)						
4 × 100 m relay	46.98	Tunisia; Nadia Abid; Saloua Dellagi; Awatef Ben Hassine; Awatef Hamrouni	24 July 1999	African Junior Championships	Tunis, Tunisia	
4 × 400 m relay	3:41.19	Tunisia; Sana Najeh; Abir Nakhli; Maha Chaouachi; Awatef Ben Hassine	25 June 2003		Radès, Tunisia	

== Indoor ==
=== Men ===
Event	Record	Athlete	Date	Meet	Place	Ref.
60 m	6.82	Badreddine El Toumi	24 January 2015		Sindelfingen, Germany	
200 m	22.10	Zied Azizi	2 February 2013		Val-de-Reuil, France	
400 m	45.93	Sofiane Labidi	13 February 2004	Razorback-Tyson Invitational	Fayetteville, United States	
600 m	1:18.56	Hassan Abidi	20 January 2024	BU Battle in Beantown	Boston, United States	
800 m	1:46.23	Hassan Abidi	18 July 2026	Penn Relays Summer Showcase	Philadelphia, United States	
1000 m	2:19.16	Ali Hakimi	18 February 1996	Meeting Pas de Calais	Liévin, France	
1500 m	3:37.50	Ali Hakimi	14 February 1997	BW-Bank Meeting	Karlsruhe, Germany	
Mile	3:59.91	Ahmed Jaziri	16 February 2024	BU DMR Challenge	Boston, United States	
3000 m	7:41.05	Ahmed Jaziri	10 February 2024	BU David Hemery Valentine Invitational	Boston, United States	
5000 m	13:24.18	Ahmed Jaziri	26 January 2024	BU John Thomas Terrier Classic	Boston, United States	
60 m hurdles	7.81	Rami Gharsalli	25 February 2017		Findlay, United States	
High jump	1.95 m	Hamdi Dhouibi	28 February 2003		Saint-Étienne, France	
Pole vault	5.35 m	Mohamed Romdhana	11 March 2017	Perche Élite Tour	Niort, France	
Long jump	7.39 m	Hamdi Dhouibi	28 February 2003		Saint-Étienne, France	
Triple jump	15.35 m	Mohamed Amin Trabelsi	14 February 2010		Moscow, Russia	
Shot put	15.70 m	Mohamed Meddeb	24 February 2001		Bucharest, Romania	
Heptathlon	5733 pts	Hamdi Dhouibi	28 February – 1 March 2003		Aubière, France	
Heptathlon	60m / Long jump / Shot put / High jump / 60m H / Pole vault / 1000m; 6.98 / 7.39 m / 12.58 m / 1.95 m / 8.11 / 4.50 m / 2:44.68					
5000 m walk	19:39.92	Hédi Teraoui	18 February 2018	French Championships	Liévin, France	
4 × 400 m relay						

=== Women ===
Event	Record	Athlete	Date	Meet	Place	Ref.
60 m	7.69	Awatef Hamrouni	16 February 2002		Bucharest, Romania	
200 m	25.61	Awatef Ben Hassine	17 February 2002		Bucharest, Romania	
400 m	53.34	Awatef Ben Hassine	2 March 2003		Aubière, France	
800 m	2:05.32	Abir Nakhli	22 February 2003		Bucharest, Romania	
1500 m	4:13.83	Abir Nakhli	15 March 2003	World Championships	Birmingham, United Kingdom	
3000 m	8:46.45	Marwa Bouzayani	10 February 2024	Meeting Hauts-de-France Pas-de-Calais	Liévin, France	
5000 m	15:06.24	Marwa Bouzayani	24 January 2026	Meeting de Lyon	Lyon, France	
60 m hurdles	8.91	Samar Ezzina	31 January 2015		Bompas, France	
60 m hurdles	8.91	Samar Ezzina	7 March 2015		Nogent-sur-Oise, France	
High jump	1.57 m	Farah Jaziri	5 February 2005		Nogent-sur-Oise, France	
High jump	1.57 m	Farah Jaziri	20 February 2005	Meeting Pas de Calais	Liévin, France	
Pole vault	4.23 m	Syrine Balti-Ebondo	8 February 2014		Nice, France	
Long jump	5.55 m	Farah Jaziri	13 January 2002		Eaubonne, France	
Triple jump	12.55 m	Ghada Hamdani	16 February 2024		Minnesota, U.S.A	
Shot put	11.86 m	Farah Jaziri	16 January 2005		Nice, France	
Pentathlon	3527 pts	Farah Jaziri	5 February 2005		Nogent-sur-Oise, France	
Pentathlon	60m H / High jump / Shot put / Long jump / 800m; 9.22 / 1.57 m / 11.17 m / 5.45 m / 2:31.89					
3000 m walk	14:13.46	Tahani Ghazal	3 February 2018		Lyon, France	
4 × 400 m relay						
