= 2018 Mediterranean Athletics U23 Championships – Results =

These are the official results of the 2018 Mediterranean Athletics U23 Championships which took place on 09–10 June 2018 in Jesolo, Italy.

== Results ==
=== Men's 100 metres ===
Heats
Wind: Heat 1: +1.4 m/s / Heat 2: +1.8 m/s

Rank	Heat	Name	Nationality	Time	Notes
1	2	Amaury Golitin	France	10.26	Q
2	1	Frederico Curvelo	Portugal	10.37	Q
3	2	Hillary Wanderson Polanco Rijo	Italy	10.47	Q
4	1	Andrei Alexandru Zlatan	Italy	10.48	Q
5	1	Ryan Zézé	France	10.48	Q
6	2	Guillermo Alcalá	Spain	10.53	Q
7	1	Aitor Ekobo	Spain	10.54	q
8	2	Ertan Özkan	Turkey	10.55	q
9	2	Mahmoud Hammoudi	Algeria	10.56	
10	2	Enej Leban	Slovenia	10.66	
11	1	Mohamed Mehdi Zekraoui	Algeria	10.70	

Final
Wind: +1.1 m/s

Rank	Name	Nationality	Time
1st place, gold medalist(s)	Amaury Golitin	France	10.07
2nd place, silver medalist(s)	Frederico Curvelo	Portugal	10.37
3rd place, bronze medalist(s)	Ryan Zézé	France	10.47
4	Ertan Özkan	Turkey	10.48
5	Andrei Alexandru Zlatan	Italy	10.48
6	Aitor Ekobo	Spain	10.57
7	Guillermo Alcalá	Spain	10.62
8	Hillary Wanderson Polanco Rijo	Italy	10.90

=== Men's 200 metres ===
Heats
Wind: Heat 1: +0.1 m/s / Heat 2: +0.6 m/s

Rank	Heat	Name	Nationality	Time	Notes
1	2	Javier Troyano	Spain	21.21	Q
2	2	Thomas Manfredi	Italy	21.25	Q
3	2	Charles Renard	France	21.25	Q
4	1	Simone Tanzilli	Italy	21.43	Q
5	1	Ilies Tano	France	21.67	Q
6	1	Aleksa Kijanović	Serbia	21.72	Q
7	1	Mohamed Mehdi Zekraoui	Algeria	21.96	q
8	2	Davide Balducci	San Marino	23.34	q
9	2	Franko Burraj	Albania	DQ	

Final
Wind: +0.3 m/s

Rank	Name	Nationality	Time
1st place, gold medalist(s)	Charles Renard	France	21.10
2nd place, silver medalist(s)	Thomas Manfredi	Italy	21.13
3rd place, bronze medalist(s)	Simone Tanzilli	Italy	21.22
4	Ilies Tano	France	21.39
5	Aleksa Kijanović	Serbia	21.96
6	Mohamed Mehdi Zekraoui	Algeria	22.44
-	Javier Troyano	Spain	DNF
-	Davide Balducci	San Marino	DNS

=== Men's 400 metres ===
Heats
Wind: Heat 1: +3.0 m/s / Heat 2: +2.8 m/s

Rank	Heat	Name	Nationality	Time	Notes
1	1	Mohamed Fares Jlassi	Tunisia	46.80	Q
2	2	Slimane Moula	Algeria	46.96	Q
3	1	Manuel Guijarro	Spain	47.34	Q
4	1	Vladimir Aceti	Italy	47.39	Q
5	2	Daniele Corsa	Italy	47.44	Q
6	2	Franko Burraj	Albania	47.67	Q
7	2	Darwin Echeverry	Spain	47.96	q
8	1	Michail Pappas	Greece	48.05	q
9	2	Alaeddine Kebsi	Turkey	48.16	
10	1	Ahmed Abdelghany	Egypt	48.96	

Final
Wind: +1.7 m/s

Rank	Name	Nationality	Time
	Mohamed Fares Jlassi	Tunisia	
	Slimane Moula	Algeria	
	Manuel Guijarro	Spain	
	Vladimir Aceti	Italy	
	Daniele Corsa	Italy	
	Franko Burraj	Albania	
	Darwin Echeverry	Spain	
	Michail Pappas	Greece	

=== Men's 800 metres ===
Final

Rank	Name	Nationality	Time
1st place, gold medalist(s)	Gabriel Tual	France	1:50.41
2nd place, silver medalist(s)	Riadh Chninni	Tunisia	1:50.56
3rd place, bronze medalist(s)	Benjamin Robert	France	1:50.89
4	Pablo Sánchez-Valladares	Spain	1:51.18
5	Iskander Jhinaoui	Tunisia	1:51.68
6	Tilen Šimenko Lalič	Slovenia	1:53.84
7	Valentin Sadiku	Kosovo	1:54.55

=== Men's 1500 metre ===
Final

Rank	Name	Nationality	Time
1st place, gold medalist(s)	Iskander Jhinaoui	Tunisia	3:47.37
2nd place, silver medalist(s)	Ignacio Fontes	Spain	3:48.29
3rd place, bronze medalist(s)	Mohamed-Amin El Bouajaji	France	3:48.90
4	Abderezak Khelili	Algeria	3:51.50
5	Ossama Meslek	Italy	3:55.04
6	Jan Kokalj	Slovenia	3:57.33
7	Louis Catteau	Monaco	4:16.73
-	Ayoub Sniba	Morocco	DNF
-	Quentin Tison	France	DNF
-	Takieddine Hedeilli	Algeria	DNF

=== Men's 5000 metre ===
Final

Rank	Name	Nationality	Time
1st place, gold medalist(s)	Jimmy Gressier	France	14:35.85
2nd place, silver medalist(s)	Tariku Novales	Spain	14:39.57
3rd place, bronze medalist(s)	Ahmed Jaziri	Tunisia	14:42.97
4	Pietro Riva	Italy	14:44.38
5	Ussama Ifraj	Spain	14:46.48
6	Francesco Breussa	Italy	15:07.96
-	Mouchin Outalha	Morocco	DNF
-	Mustafa Öz Seçer	Turkey	DNF

=== Men's 10000 metres ===
Final

Rank	Name	Nationality	Time
1st place, gold medalist(s)	Alessandro Giacobazzi	Italy	30:18.10
2nd place, silver medalist(s)	Ahmed Ouhda	Italy	30:30.84
3rd place, bronze medalist(s)	Sezgin Ataç	Turkey	31:04.51
4	Alberto Mondazzi	Italy	31:47.86
5	Georgios-Michalis Tassis	Greece	32:12.40
6	Amin Houkmi	Spain	32:50.64
7	Youssef Benkert	Spain	37:16.83
-	Onur Aras	Turkey	DNF

=== Men's 110 metres hurdles ===
Final

Rank	Name	Nationality	Time
1st place, gold medalist(s)	Junior Effa Effa	France	13.97
2nd place, silver medalist(s)	Amine Bouanani	Algeria	14.01
3rd place, bronze medalist(s)	Francesco Ferrante	Italy	14.02
4	Antonio García	Spain	14.05

=== Men's 400 meters hurdles ===
Heats
Wind: Heat 1: +3.0 m/s / Heat 2: +2.8 m/s

Rank	Heat	Name	Nationality	Time	Notes
1	1	Javier Delgado	Spain	51.27	Q
2	1	Wilfried Happio	France	51.97	Q
3	2	Hrvoje Čukman	Croatia	52.00	Q
4	1	Sinan Oren	Turkey	52.14	Q
5	1	Mohamed Amin Touati	Tunisia	52.18	q
6	2	Matteo Beria	Italy	52.61	Q
7	2	David José Pineda	Spain	53.55	Q
8	2	Osama El Abbady	Egypt	53.86	q
9	1	Anastasios Vasileiou	Cyprus	54.06	
10	2	Jan Jamnik	Slovenia	54.06	

Final
Wind: +1.7 m/s

Rank	Name	Nationality	Time
1st place, gold medalist(s)	Matteo Beria	Italy	50.52
2nd place, silver medalist(s)	Wilfried Happio	France	50.65
3rd place, bronze medalist(s)	Javier Delgado	Spain	50.82
4	David José Pineda	Spain	50.88
5	Mohamed Amin Touati	Tunisia	51.40
6	Hrvoje Čukman	Croatia	51.57
7	Sinan Oren	Turkey	51.68
-	Osama El Abbady	Egypt	DNS

=== Men's 3000 metres steeplechase ===
Final

Rank	Name	Nationality	Time
1st place, gold medalist(s)	Alexis Phelut	France	8:55.89
2nd place, silver medalist(s)	Mohamed Amin Jhinaoui	Tunisia	9:02.70
3rd place, bronze medalist(s)	Ahmed Abdelwahed	Italy	9:00.01
4	Samuel Abascal	Spain	9:01.41
5	Sofiane Cherni	Tunisia	9:09.15
6	Simone Colombini	Italy	9:11.02
7	Nahuel Carabaña	Andorra	9:36.55
-	Alexis Rodríguez	Spain	DNF

=== Men's 10000 metre race walk ===
Final

Rank	Name	Nationality	Time
1st place, gold medalist(s)	Stefano Chiesa	Italy	41:09.10
2nd place, silver medalist(s)	Manuel Bermúdez	Spain	41:14.24
3rd place, bronze medalist(s)	Gianluca Picchiottino	Italy	42:16.60
4	Iván López	Spain	42:51.34
5	Salih Korkmaz	Turkey	43:00.15
6	Giacomo Brandi	Italy	43:05.00
7	Othmane Chibani	Algeria	52:06.50
-	Georgios Tzatzimakis	Greece	DQ
-	Adlane El Bey	Algeria	DQ
-	Pablo Oliva	Spain	DNF

=== Men's high jump ===
Final

Rank	Athlete	Nationality	1.95	2.00	2.04	2.07	2.10	2.13	2.16	2.19	2.22	Result
1st place, gold medalist(s)	Christian Falocchi	Italy	-	-	o	-	o	-	o	o	xxx	2.19
2nd place, silver medalist(s)	Stefano Sottile	Italy	-	-	o	-	o	-	xxo	xo	xxx	2.19
3rd place, bronze medalist(s)	Alperen Acet	Turkey	-	-	o	-	o	-	o	xxx		2.16
4	Juan Ignacio López	Spain	-	o	-	o	o	xo	o	xxx		2.16
5	Nathan Ismar	France	-	-	xo	-	xxo	o	x-	xx		2.13
6	Sebastien Micheau	France	-	-	o	o	o	xxx				2.10
7	Álvaro Martínez	Spain	-	o	-	xxo	xxo	xxx				2.10
7	Filip Mrcic	Croatia	o	o	o	xxo	xxo	xxx				2.10
9	Mohamed Amine Fodil	Algeria	o	-	xxo	xo	xxo	xxx				2.10
10	Maid Redžić	Bosnia and Herzegovina	o	o	o	xo	xxx					2.07

=== Men's pole vault ===
Final

Rank	Athlete	Nationality	4.80	5.00	5.10	5.20	5.30	5.40	5.45	5.50	5.75	Result
1st place, gold medalist(s)	Alioune Sene	France	-	-	-	-	o	-	-	o	xxx	5.50
2nd place, silver medalist(s)	Thibaud Collet	France	-	-	o	-	o	xo	-	xxx		5.40
3rd place, bronze medalist(s)	Gonzalo Santamaría	Spain	xo	o	xo	o	xxo	xx-	x			5.30
4	Aleix Pi	Spain	o	o	o	o	xxx					5.20
5	Luigi Robert Colella	Italy	o	xxo	o	o	xxx					5.20
6	Max Mandusic	Italy	o	xo	-	xo	xxx					5.20
7	Ersu Sasma	Turkey	-	xxo	xo	xxx						5.10
8	Dario Prekl	Croatia	-	o	xx-	x						5.00
9	Lev Skorish	Israel	-	xxo	-	xxx						5.00

=== Men's long jump ===
Rank	Athlete	Nationality	#1	#2	#3	#4	#5	#6	Result
1st place, gold medalist(s)	Filippo Randazzo	Italy	X	X	7.88	X	X	X	7.88
2nd place, silver medalist(s)	Gabriele Chilà	Italy	7.51	X	7.67	X	7.76	7.82	7.82
3rd place, bronze medalist(s)	Daniel Solis	Spain	x	7.78	7.81	x	5,76	-	7.81
4	Héctor Santos	Spain	7.77	X	X	7.60	-	7.67	7.77
5	Ivan Vujević	Croatia	X	X	7.55	7.67	7.73	7.60	7.73
6	Cedric Dufag	France	7.63	X	7.52	7.49	7.46	X	7.63
7	Ivo Tavares	Portugal	7.62	X	X	7.54	7.58	7.59	7.62
8	Antonios Stylianidis	Greece	7.42	X	7.39	7.20	X	X	7.42
9	Aljaž Murovec	Slovenia	X	X	6.44				6.44

=== Men's triple jump ===
Rank	Athlete	Nationality	#1	#2	#3	#4	#5	#6	Result
1st place, gold medalist(s)	Quentin Mouyabi	France	15.82	15.60	X	16.13	16.27	16.72	16.72
2nd place, silver medalist(s)	Simone Forte	Italy	15.94	X	X	16.47	X	15.52	16.47
3rd place, bronze medalist(s)	Can Özüpek	Turkey	15.82	16.39	14.41	15.98	16.26	16.38	16.39
4	Necati Er	Turkey	15.03	16.31	X	-	-	-	16.31
5	Tobia Bocchi	Italy	X	15.53	15.52	X	15.76	X	15.76
6	Oleksandr Lyashchenko	Portugal	15.44	X	15.21	X	15.61	X	15.61
7	Dimítrios Monópolis	Greece	15.39	15.56	X	X	15.42	X	15.56
8	Ramón Adalia	Spain	15.31	X	15.50	X	15.44	15.39	15.50
9	Longinos Achilleos	Cyprus	14.74	15.05	14.60				15.05

=== Men's shot put ===
Rank	Athlete	Nationality	#1	#2	#3	#4	#5	#6	Result
1st place, gold medalist(s)	Leonardo Fabbri	Italy	18.75	X	19.40	X	18.86	X	19.40
2nd place, silver medalist(s)	Sebastiano Bianchetti	Italy	18.47	19.23	X	19.18	19.31	19.20	19.31
3rd place, bronze medalist(s)	Anastasios Latifllari	Greece	18.47	18.23	X	18.68	18.90	18.69	18.90
4	Mohamed Khalifa	Egypt	18.18	18.80	X	X	X	X	18.80
5	Kyriakos Zotos	Greece	17.01	X	X	18.04	17.89	X	18.04

=== Men's hammer throw ===
Rank	Athlete	Nationality	#1	#2	#3	#4	#5	#6	Result
1st place, gold medalist(s)	Yann Chaussinand	France	X	63.53	66.48	X	68.93	X	68.93
2nd place, silver medalist(s)	Giacomo Proserpio	Italy	64.42	66.97	X	X	66.89	X	66.97
3rd place, bronze medalist(s)	Tiziano Di Blasio	Italy	60.06	64.28	61.96	X	X	63.49	64.28
4	Alberto González	Spain	62.63	61.20	64.04	X	X	61.39	64.04
5	Décio Andrade	Portugal	X	60.74	62.62	X	X	X	62.62
6	Matija Greguric	Croatia	60.21	X	X	X	X	X	60.21

=== Women's 100 meters ===
Heats
Wind: Heat 1: +3.0 m/s / Heat 2: +2.8 m/s

Rank	Heat	Name	Nationality	Time	Notes
1	2	Paula Sevilla	Spain	11.52	Q
2	2	Diana Vaisman	Israel	11.59	Q
3	1	Basant Hemida	Egypt	11.64	Q
4	1	Eleonora Iori	Italy	11.67	Q
5	1	Mizgin Ay	Turkey	11.68	Q
6	2	Margherita Zuecco	Italy	11.68	Q
7	2	Caroline Chaillou	France	11.72	q
8	1	Lea Mormin	France	11.75	q
9	2	Rosalina Santos	Portugal	11.76	
10	1	Zorana Barjaktarović	Serbia	11.81	
11	1	Bianca Acosta	Spain	11.87	
10	2	Lea Obeid	Lebanon	12.64	
11	1	Paraskevi Andreou	Cyprus	23.85	

Final
Wind: +1.7 m/s

Rank	Name	Nationality	Time
	Paula Sevilla	Spain	
	Diana Vaisman	Israel	
	Basant Hemida	Egypt	
	Eleonora Iori	Italy	
	Mizgin Ay	Turkey	
	Margherita Zuecco	Italy	
	Caroline Chaillou	France	
	Lea Mormin	France	

=== Women's 800 meters ===
Rank	Name	Nationality	Time
1st place, gold medalist(s)	Elena Bellò	Italy	2:04.31
2nd place, silver medalist(s)	Corane Gazeau	France	2:04.69
3rd place, bronze medalist(s)	Khadija Benkassem	Morocco	2:08.26
4	Charlotte Mouchet	France	2:08.65
5	Hala Hamdi	Tunisia	2:11.47

=== Women's 1500 meters ===
Rank	Name	Nationality	Time
1st place, gold medalist(s)	Imane El Bouhali	Morocco	4:22.95
2nd place, silver medalist(s)	Lucía Rodríguez	Spain	4:24.63
3rd place, bronze medalist(s)	Fatma Arik	Turkey	4:29.63

=== Women's 5000 meters ===
Rank	Name	Nationality	Time
1st place, gold medalist(s)	Mathilde Sénéchal	France	16:29.42
2nd place, silver medalist(s)	Marta García	Spain	16:31.39
3rd place, bronze medalist(s)	Francesca Tommasi	Italy	16:32.21
4	Emeline Delanis	France	16:41.14
5	Federica Zanne	Italy	16:59.05

=== Women's 10.000 metres ===
Rank	Name	Nationality	Time
1st place, gold medalist(s)	Nicole Svetlana Reina	Italy	35:27.66
2nd place, silver medalist(s)	Rebecca Lonedo	Italy	35:59.51
3rd place, bronze medalist(s)	Nuran Satılmış	Turkey	36:18.80
4	Paula González	Spain	36:23.27
5	Lucía Álvarez	Spain	36:33.98
6	Moscha E. Manousou	Greece	36:53.77
-	Alessia Tuccitto	Italy	DNF

=== Women's 100 metres hurdles ===
Rank	Name	Nationality	Time
1st place, gold medalist(s)	Laura Valette	France	13.11
2nd place, silver medalist(s)	Elisa Di Lazzaro	Italy	13.22
3rd place, bronze medalist(s)	Nicla Mosetti	Italy	13.26
4	Natalia Christofi	Cyprus	13.34
5	Şevval Ayaz	Turkey	13.49
6	Lina Ahmed	Egypt	13.63
7	Charlotte Pierre	France	13.70

=== Women's 400 metres hurdles ===
Rank	Name	Nationality	Time
1st place, gold medalist(s)	Rebecca Sartori	Italy	57.43
2nd place, silver medalist(s)	Nina Brino	France	58.11
3rd place, bronze medalist(s)	Lucie Kudela	France	58.11
4	Linda Olivieri	Italy	58.16
5	Ida Simuncic	Croatia	58.89
-	Drita Islami	Macedonia	DQ

=== Women's pole vault ===
Rank	Athlete	Nationality	3.65	3.80	3.95	4.05	4.15	4.25	4.30	4.35	4.40	Result
1st place, gold medalist(s)	Elen Klaountia Polak	Greece	-	-	-	xo	o	xo	o	o	xxx	4,35
2nd place, silver medalist(s)	Mónica Clemente	Spain	-	xo	-	o	o	o	o	xxx		4,30
3rd place, bronze medalist(s)	Mallaury Brossier	France	-	-	o	xxo	o	xxo	xo	xxx		4,30
4	Miren Bartolomé	Spain	-	o	-	xxo	o	o	xxx			4,25
5	Rebecca De Martin	Italy	o	o	o	o	xo	xxx				4,15
6	Mesure Tutku Yılmaz	Turkey	-	o	xo	xo	xo	xxx				4,15
7	Charlotte Gaudy	France	-	-	o	o	xxx					4,05
8	Marta Ronconi	Italy	xxo	xo	xxx							3,80

=== Women's long jump ===
Rank	Athlete	Nationality	#1	#2	#3	#4	#5	#6	Result
1st place, gold medalist(s)	Evelise Veiga	Portugal	6.04	X	X	6.09	6.26	X	6.26
2nd place, silver medalist(s)	Fátima Diame	Spain	5.92	5.87	6.06	6.15	X	X	6.15
3rd place, bronze medalist(s)	Hillary Kapcha	France	6.06	X	5.91	5.76	5.68	5.91	6.06
4	Chloé Maurin	France	5.60	5.88	5.73	5.82	X	X	5.88
5	Beatrice Fiorese	Italy	X	X	5.71	X	5.84	5.81	5.84
6	Francesca Bianco	Italy	5.67	X	X	5.61	X	5.65	5.67

=== Women's hammer throw ===
Rank	Athlete	Nationality	#1	#2	#3	#4	#5	#6	Result
1st place, gold medalist(s)	Audrey Ciofani	France	X	63.78	X	64.87	61.62	X	64.87
2nd place, silver medalist(s)	Camille Sainte-Luce	France	63.15	62.60	62.81	63.36	62.78	64.47	64.47
3rd place, bronze medalist(s)	Sara Fantini	Italy	X	54.65	61.38	61.17	X	X	61.38
4	Chrystalla Kyriakou	Cyprus	60.94	X	59.13	59.85	X	X	60.94
5	Luc Prinetti Anzalapaya	Italy	52.36	58.20	59.13	X	59.55	55.38	59.55
6	Betül Duran	Turkey	X	X	52.32	53.86	X	X	53.86
7	Deniz Yaylaci	Turkey	52.66	X	X	X	53.67	X	53.67
