= 2026 European Athletics Championships – Men's half marathon race walk =

Men's half marathon race walk at the 2026 European Athletics Championships
- Venue: Alexander Stadium
- Location: Birmingham, United Kingdom
- Dates: 15 August 2026
- Winning time: 1:23:23 PB

Medalists
gold medal	Paul McGrath	Spain
silver medal	Francesco Fortunato	Italy
bronze medal	Andrea Cosi	Italy

The men's half marathon race walk at the 2026 European Athletics Championships took place in Birmingham, United Kingdom, on 15 August 2026.

== Background ==
Records before the 2026 European Athletics Championships
Record	Athlete (nation)	Time	Location	Date
World record	Toshikazu Yamanishi (JPN)	1:20:34	Kobe, Japan	15 February 2026
World leading	Toshikazu Yamanishi (JPN)	1:20:34	Kobe, Japan	15 February 2026
Championship record	New event			
European record	Francesco Fortunato (ITA)	1:23:00	Poděbrady, Czech Republic	8 May 2026
European leading	Francesco Fortunato (ITA)	1:23:00	Poděbrady, Czech Republic	8 May 2026

== Qualification ==
The qualification period was from 27 January 2025 to 26 July 2026. Athletes qualified by the entry standard of 1:26:15 m or faster in half marathon race walk, by the entry standard of 1:21:00 in 20 km walk, or by their position on the World Athletics Rankings for the event. The target number was 35 athletes. Eventually 28 athletes qualified.

Qualification standings per 31 July 2026
QP	CP	Country	Athlete	Status	Details
1	1	Italy	Francesco Fortunato	Qualified by Entry Standard	1:23:00 - Kolonáda, Poděbrady (CZE) - 08 MAY 2026
2	1	Germany	Christopher Linke	Qualified by Entry Standard	1:23:46 - Kolonáda, Poděbrady (CZE) - 08 MAY 2026
3	2	Italy	Andrea Cosi	Qualified by Entry Standard	1:23:59 - Kolonáda, Poděbrady (CZE) - 08 MAY 2026
4	2	Germany	Leo Köpp	Qualified by Entry Standard	1:24:27 - Kolonáda, Poděbrady (CZE) - 08 MAY 2026
5	1	Spain	Iván López	Qualified by Entry Standard	1:25:05 - Kolonáda, Poděbrady (CZE) - 08 MAY 2026
6	2	Spain	Paul McGrath	Qualified by Entry Standard	1:25:20 - La Coruña (ESP) - 23 MAY 2026
7	3	Italy	Gianluca Picchiottino	Qualified by Entry Standard	1:25:27 - Alessandria (ITA) - 08 MAR 2026
8	1	Ukraine	Mukola Rushchak	Qualified by Entry Standard	1:25:50 - Lutsk (UKR) - 20 JUN 2026
9	3	Spain	Diego García Carrera	Qualified by Entry Standard	1:26:07 - Cieza (ESP) - 08 MAR 2026
10	1	France	Kilian Lebreton	Qualified by Entry Standard	1:26:10 - Kolonáda, Poděbrady (CZE) - 08 MAY 2026
reserve	4	Spain	Álvaro López	Qualified by Entry Standard	1:19:38 - Lázeňský Park, Poděbrady (CZE) - 18 MAY 2025
11	1	Poland	Maher Ben Hlima	Qualified by Entry Standard	1:20:05 - Alytus (LTU) - 12 JUN 2025
reserve	4	Italy	Michele Antonelli	Qualified by Entry Standard	1:20:43 - Lázeňský Park, Poděbrady (CZE) - 18 MAY 2025
12	1	Ireland	David Kenny	Qualified by Entry Standard	1:20:54 - Lázeňský Park, Poděbrady (CZE) - 18 MAY 2025
13	1	Turkey	Mazlum Demir	Qualified by Entry Standard	1:20:57 - Dudince (SVK) - 22 MAR 2025
14	1	Finland	Veli-Matti Partanen	Qualified by World Rankings	16th - 1192 points
15	2	Finland	Jerry Jokinen	Qualified by World Rankings	26th - 1172 points
16	2	Turkey	Salih Korkmaz	Qualified by World Rankings	28th - 1166 points
reserve	5	Italy	Emiliano Brigante	Qualified by World Rankings	33rd - 1149 points
17	3	Germany	Frederick Weigel	Qualified by World Rankings	36th - 1143 points
18	3	Turkey	Hayrettin Yıldız	Qualified by World Rankings	40th - 1129 points
19	1	Portugal	João Vieira	Qualified by World Rankings	42nd - 1128 points
20	2	Ireland	Oisin Lane	Qualified by World Rankings	47th - 1118 points
21	1	Czech Republic	Albert Kukla	Qualified by World Rankings	53rd - 1114 points
22	2	Portugal	Eduardo Camarate	Qualified by World Rankings	61st - 1101 points
23	1	Greece	Georgios Kritoulis	Qualified by World Rankings	64th - 1098 points
24	3	Finland	Joni Hava	Qualified by World Rankings	70th - 1092 points
25	2	Ukraine	Roman Horbachov	Qualified by World Rankings	77th - 1059 points
26	3	Portugal	Tiago Ramos	Qualified by World Rankings	79th - 1054 points
27	2	Greece	Andreas Papastergiou	Qualified by World Rankings	98th - 1015 points
28	3	Greece	Konstantinos-Alexandros Ntentopoulos	Qualified by World Rankings	103rd - 989 points

== Schedule ==
Date	Time	Round
15 August 2026	7:30	Final

All times are local times (UTC+1)

== Results ==
Key:	~ Red card for loss of contact	> Red card for bent knee

Place	Athlete	Nation	Time	Red cards	Notes
1st place, gold medalist(s)	Paul McGrath	Spain	1:23:23		PB
2nd place, silver medalist(s)	Francesco Fortunato	Italy	1:23:36		
3rd place, bronze medalist(s)	Andrea Cosi	Italy	1:23:49		PB
4	Mykola Rushchak	Ukraine	1:24:12	~	NR
5	Salih Korkmaz	Turkey	1:24:45	~ ~	PB
6	David Kenny	Ireland	1:24:49	~	PB
7	Álvaro López	Spain	1:25:25	~ ~	PB
8	Diego García	Spain	1:25:41		PB
9	Maher Ben Hlima	Poland	1:26:14	>	NR
10	Jerry Jokinen	Finland	1:26:33		PB
11	Oisin Lane	Ireland	1:27:09	~	PB
12	Albert Kukla	Czech Republic	1:28:01		
13	Kilian Lebreton	France	1:28:22		
14	Aku Partanen	Finland	1:29:07	~ ~ ~	
15	Gianluca Picchiottino	Italy	1:29:14		
16	Joni Hava	Finland	1:29:25		PB
17	Georgios Kritoulis	Greece	1:29:39	~	PB
18	Frederick Weigel	Germany	1:30:04		
19	Eduardo Camarate	Portugal	1:30:12		PB
20	Andreas Papastergiou	Greece	1:30:59		PB
21	Hayrettin Yildiz	Turkey	1:32:14	~ ~ ~	PB
22	Tiago Ramos	Portugal	1:32:28		PB
23	Roman Horbachov	Ukraine	1:33:44	~ ~	
24	Konstadínos Dedópoulos	Greece	1:37:34	~	SB
—	João Vieira	Portugal	DNF	>	
—	Mazlum Demir	Turkey	DNF		
—	Leo Köpp	Germany	DQ	~ ~ ~ ~	TR54.7.5
