= Nassim Hassaous =

Spanish athlete (born 1994)

Personal information
- Born: 23 March 1994 (age 32)

Sport
- Sport: Athletics
- Event: Long distance running

Achievements and titles
- Personal bests: 3000m: 7:43.22 (Paris, 2024)
Medal record
Men's athletics
Representing Spain
European Cross Country Championships
Gold medal – first place	2024 Antalya	Team race
Silver medal – second place	2021 Dublin	Team race
Gold medal – first place	2015 Hyères	U23 Team

Nassim Hassaous (born 23 March 1994) is a Spanish long distance runner.

== Early life ==
He was born in Las Palmas de Gran Canaria to an Algerian father and a Spanish mother from Madrid. His family moved to Tudela, Navarre as his mother died, when he was three years old. A keen footballer in his youth he began training seriously in athletics when he was 12 years old. He moved to Valladolid to study history at university in 2014.

== Career ==
Whilst a student, he was runner-up in the Spanish university championship over 10,000 metres in 2015. In December 2015, he made his debut with the Spanish team at the 2015 European Cross Country Championships in Hyères, where he finished seventh in the U23 race and won gold in the U23 team race. In 2016, he won his first national medal, winning the silver medal in the indoor 3000 metres behind Marc Alcalá and then won silver in the outdoor steeplechase behind Jorge Blanco.

He was a silver medalist with the Spanish men’s team at the 2021 European Cross Country Championships in Dublin. He competed at the 2022 European Cross Country Championships in Turin.

He was selected for the 2023 World Athletics Cross Country Championships in Bathurst, Australia, finishing 34th overall and helping Spain to a seventh place finish. He raced at the 2024 World Athletics Cross Country Championships in Belgrade, in which the Spanish team finished fourth overall.

He placed twelfth in the 3000 metres at the 2024 Meeting de Paris in July 2024. He was a gold medalist with the Spanish team at the 2024 European Cross Country Championships in Antalya, Turkey.

Hassaous finished in sixth place overall in the 2025-26 World Athletics Cross Country Tour standings.

== International competitions ==
Year	Competition	Venue	Position	Event	Notes
Representing Spain
2016	Mediterranean U23 Championships	Radès, Tunisia	5th	5000 m	14:48.89
2018	Ibero-American Championships	Trujillo, Peru	6th	3000 m	8:15.36
2019	European 10,000 m Cup	London, Great Britain	33rd	10,000 m	29:19.75
2024	World Cross Country Championships	Belgrade, Serbia	61st	10 km XC	30:41
2025	European Running Championships	Leuven, Belgium	13th	Half marathon	1:02:52
