= 2023 European Athletics U23 Championships – Men's 20 kilometres walk =

Men's 20 kilometres walk at the 2023 European Athletics U23 Championships
- Venue: Leppävaara Stadium
- Location: Espoo, Finland
- Dates: 12 July
- Competitors: 24 from 12 nations
- Winning time: 1:21:03

Medalists
gold medal	Paul McGrath	Spain
silver medal	Andrea Cosi	Italy
bronze medal	Jerry Jokinen	Finland

The men's 20 kilometres walk event at the 2023 European Athletics U23 Championships was held in Espoo, Finland, at Leppävaara Stadium on 12 July.

== Records ==
Prior to the competition, the records were as follows:

European U23 record	Vladimir Kanaykin (RUS)	1:17:16	Saransk, Russia	29 September 2007
Championship U23 record	Aigars Fadejevs (LAT)	1:19:58	Turku, Finland	10 July 1997

== Results ==
Place	Athlete	Nation	Time	Fouls	Notes
1st place, gold medalist(s)	Paul McGrath	Spain	1:21:03		PB
2nd place, silver medalist(s)	Andrea Cosi	Italy	1:23:02	~	
3rd place, bronze medalist(s)	Jerry Jokinen	Finland	1:24:41		NU23R
4	Aythamy Afonso Gonzalez	Spain	1:25:17		PB
5	Mattéo Duc	France	1:25:18		PB
6	Mukola Rushchak	Ukraine	1:25:23		PB
7	Jaromír Morávek	Czech Republic	1:25:33	~~	PB
8	Norbert Tóth	Hungary	1:26:47	~~~	PB
9	Adam Zajíček	Czech Republic	1:27:05	~	
10	Johannes Frenzl	Germany	1:27:25	~~	
11	Oscar Martinez	Spain	1:28:47	~~	
12	Martin Madeline-Degy	France	1:28:54	~	
13	Lauri Joukas	Finland	1:28:58		PB
14	Oisin Lane	Ireland	1:29:11	~~	
15	Jonathan Ekberg	Finland	1:29:53	~>	PB
16	Tiago Ramos	Portugal	1:30:12	>>	PB
17	Anthimos Kelepouris	Greece	1:31:24		PB
18	Pedro Dias	Portugal	1:34:57		
19	Andreas Papastergiou	Greece	1:36:20	>>~	
—	Mazlum Demir	Turkey	DNF	~~	
—	Taras Koretskyy	Ukraine	DNF	~~	
—	Davide Finocchietti	Italy	DQ	>~>~	TR 54.7.5
—	Emiliano Brigante	Italy	DQ	~~>~	TR 54.7.5
—	Yehor Shelest	Ukraine	DQ	>>>>	TR 54.7.5
