= 2016 Mediterranean Athletics U23 Championships – Results =

These are the official results of the 2016 Mediterranean Athletics U23 Championships which took place on 14–15 June 2014 in Tunis, Tunisia.

== Men's results ==
=== 100 metres ===
Rank	Name	Nationality	Time
1st place, gold medalist(s)	Stuart Dutamby	France	10.23
2nd place, silver medalist(s)	Marvin René	France	10.35
3rd place, bronze medalist(s)	Lorenzo Bilotti	Italy	10.48
4	Pietro Pivotto	Italy	10.64
5	Ahac Moretti	Slovenia	10.73
6	Abdal Ahmed	Egypt	10.80
7	Ahmed Grera	Libya	10.90
8	Adem Najah	Tunisia	11.11
-	Luke Bezzina	Malta	DQ

=== 200 metres ===
Heats

Rank	Heat	Name	Nationality	Time	Notes
1	1	Mickael-Meba Zeze	France	20.88	Q
2	2	Simone Tanzilli	Italy	20.91	Q
3	1	Batuhan Altıntaş	Tunisia	21.06	Q
4	2	Gautier Dautremer	France	21.06	Q
5	1	Daniele Corsa	Italy	21.26	Q
6	2	Mauro Triana	Spain	21.31	Q
7	2	Daniel Cerdán	Spain	21.57	Q
8	1	Georgios Agoritsas	Greece	21.78	Q
9	1	Ahmed Grera	Libya	21.93	
10	2	Ahac Moretti	Slovenia	22.03	
11	1	Fakhreddine Selliti	Tunisia	22.22	
12	1	Luke Bezzina	Malta	22.40	
13	2	Francesco Molinari	San Marino	22.50	
-	1	Abdal Ahmed	Egypt	DNS	
-	2	Mohamed Dawoud	Egypt	DNS	

Final
Wind: +1.7 m/s

Rank	Name	Nationality	Time
1st place, gold medalist(s)	Mickael-Meba Zeze	France	20.49
2nd place, silver medalist(s)	Simone Tanzilli	Italy	20.90
3rd place, bronze medalist(s)	Gautier Dautremer	France	21.03
4	Daniele Corsa	Italy	21.10
5	Mauro Triana	Spain	21.37
6	Daniel Cerdán	Spain	21.76
7	Georgios Agoritsas	Greece	21.82
-	Batuhan Altıntaş	Tunisia	DNS

=== 400 metres ===
Rank	Name	Nationality	Time
1st place, gold medalist(s)	Giuseppe Leonardi	Italy	46.66
2nd place, silver medalist(s)	Batuhan Altıntaş	Turkey	47.36
3rd place, bronze medalist(s)	Ali Seayed	Tunisia	48.81

=== 800 metres ===
Rank	Name	Nationality	Time
1st place, gold medalist(s)	Abdelssalam Ayouni	Tunisia	1:47.79
2nd place, silver medalist(s)	Riadh Chenenni	Tunisia	1:48.04
3rd place, bronze medalist(s)	Saúl Ordóñez	Spain	1:48.12
4	Oussama Nabil	Morocco	1:48.42
5	Pol Moya	Andorra	1:50.63
-	Marjac Pregat	Slovenia	DNS
-	Paulo Rosario	Portugal	DNS

=== 1500 metres ===
Rank	Name	Nationality	Time
1st place, gold medalist(s)	Abdelssalam Ayouni	Tunisia	4:09.39
2nd place, silver medalist(s)	Süleyman Bekmezci	Turkey	4:09.56
3rd place, bronze medalist(s)	Jesús Ramos	Spain	4:09.66
4	Paulo Rosario	Portugal	4:10.84
5	Ali Kaddechi	Tunisia	4:11.06
6	Marjac Pregat	Slovenia	4:23.65

=== 5000 metres ===
Rank	Name	Nationality	Time
1st place, gold medalist(s)	Süleyman Bekmezci	Turkey	14:41.03
2nd place, silver medalist(s)	Artur Bossy	Spain	14:41.42
3rd place, bronze medalist(s)	Nadir Gouasmia	Algeria	14:42.45
4	Lahcen Ait Alibou	Spain	14:44.82
5	Nassim Hassaous	Spain	14:48.89
6	Iliass Aouani	Italy	14:56.15
7	Ahmed Jaziri	Tunisia	14:58.39

=== 10000 metres ===
Rank	Name	Nationality	Time
1st place, gold medalist(s)	Mohamed Ali Jelloul	Spain	29:49.60
2nd place, silver medalist(s)	Alessandro Giacobazzi	Italy	29:50.01
3rd place, bronze medalist(s)	Ismael Quiñones	Spain	30:07.84
4	Bilal Tarabhat	Algeria	30:17.62
5	Andrea Elia	Italy	30:37.37
6	Daniel Martínez	Spain	30:45.42
7	Romdhane Badri	Tunisia	31:21.78
8	Ruben Pessoa	Portugal	32:07.38
-	Korkmaz Enes	Turkey	DNF
-	Nekagenet Crippa	Italy	DNF
