= 2021 European Athletics U23 Championships – Men's 20 kilometres walk =

Men's 20 kilometres walk at the 2021 European Athletics U23 Championships
- Venue: Kadriorg Stadium, Tallinn
- Dates: 9 July
- Competitors: 14 from 8 nations
- Winning time: 1:25:06

Medalists
gold medal	José Manuel Pérez	Spain
silver medal	David Kenny	Ireland
bronze medal	Andrea Cosi	Italy

The men's 20 kilometres walk event at the 2021 European Athletics U23 Championships was held in Tallinn, Estonia, at Kadriorg Stadium on 9 July.

== Records ==
Prior to the competition, the records were as follows:

European U23 record	Vladimir Kanaykin (RUS)	1:17:16	Saransk, Russia	29 September 2007
Championship U23 record	Aigars Fadejevs (LAT)	1:19:58	Turku, Finland	10 July 1997

== Results ==
Rank	Name	Nationality	Time	Notes
1st place, gold medalist(s)	José Manuel Pérez	Spain	1:25:06	
2nd place, silver medalist(s)	David Kenny	Ireland	1:25:50	
3rd place, bronze medalist(s)	Andrea Cosi	Italy	1:26:05	
4	Riccardo Orsoni	Italy	1:27:23	
5	Pedro Conesa	Spain	1:31:37	
6	Abdulselam İmuk	Turkey	1:32:26	
7	Selman Ilhan	Turkey	1:36:46	
8	Joni Hava	Finland	1:36:58	
	Łukasz Niedziałek	Poland	DNF	
	Davide Finocchietti	Italy	DNF	
	Álvaro López	Spain	DNF	
	Pavel Olkhovik	Belarus	DNF	
	Mikita Kaliada	Belarus	DNF	
	David Kuster	France	DQ	TR54.7.3
