= Athletics at the 2025 Summer World University Games – Men's 20 kilometres walk =

Men's 20 kilometres walk at the 2025 Summer World University Games
- Venue: Kemnader See
- Location: Bochum, Germany
- Dates: 27 July
- Competitors: 34 from 15 nations
- Winning time: 1:19:48 GR

Medalists
gold medal	Andrea Cosi	Italy
silver medal	Atsuki Tsuchiya	Japan
bronze medal	Mukola Rushchak	Ukraine

The men's 20 kilometres walk event at the 2025 Summer World University Games was held in Bochum, Germany, at Kemnader See on 27 July.

== Results ==
=== Individual ===
Place	Athlete	Nation	Time	Notes
1st place, gold medalist(s)	Andrea Cosi	Italy	1:19:48	GR
2nd place, silver medalist(s)	Atsuki Tsuchiya	Japan	1:20:08	
3rd place, bronze medalist(s)	Mukola Rushchak	Ukraine	1:20:10	
4	Keisuke Hara	Japan	1:20:26	
5	Will Thompson	Australia	1:21:01	
6	Tim Fraser	Australia	1:21:12	
7	Hu Xuanfei	China	1:21:12	
8	Huang Peiyang	China	1:22:07	
9	Mazlum Demir	Turkey	1:22:13	
10	Isaac Beacroft	Australia	1:22:37	PB
11	Oisin Lane	Ireland	1:23:06	PB
12	Taisei Yoshizako	Japan	1:23:11	
13	Frederick Weigel	Germany	1:23:20	PB
14	Johannes Frenzl	Germany	1:24:12	
15	Jassam Abu el Wafa	Germany	1:24:56	PB
16	Josafat Sánchez Peña	Mexico	1:25:07	
17	Seongyoon Lee	South Korea	1:25:08	
18	Chaofan Sun	China	1:25:48	
19	Corey Dickson	Australia	1:25:58	
20	Rahul	India	1:26:34	SB
21	Harun Bilir	Turkey	1:26:42	PB
22	Yung-Kuei Chan	Chinese Taipei	1:26:58	
23	Carlos Mercenario	Mexico	1:27:23	
24	Alex Sanchez Guaman	Ecuador	1:28:05	PB
25	Gaurav Kumar	India	1:28:44	
26	Norbert Tóth	Hungary	1:29:12	
27	Dongmin Lim	South Korea	1:30:18	
28	Sachin Singh Bohra	India	1:32:03	
29	Hayrettin Yildiz	Turkey	1:33:09	
30	Chia-Hung Lin	Chinese Taipei	1:33:44	
31	Sanjay Kumar	India	1:46:21	
—	Adam Zajíček	Czech Republic	DNF	
—	Mitchell Baker	Australia	DQ	TR54.7.5
—	Hsu Chia-wei	Chinese Taipei	DQ	TR54.7.5

=== Team ===
Rank	Nation	Athletes	Time	Notes
1st place, gold medalist(s)	Japan	Atsuki Tsuchiya; Keisuke Hara; Taisei Yoshizako	4:03:45	
2nd place, silver medalist(s)	Australia	William Thompson; Timothy Fraser; Isaac Beacroft; Corey Dickson	4:04:50	
3rd place, bronze medalist(s)	China	Hu Xuanfei; Huang Peiyang; Sun Chaofan	4:09:07	
4	Germany	Frederick Weigel; Johannes Frenzl; Jassam Abu el Wafa	4:12:28	
5	Turkey	Mazlum Demir; Harun Bilir; Hayrettin Yildiz	4:22:04	
6	India	Rahul; Gaurav Kumar; Sachin Singh Bohra; Sanjay Kumar	4:27:21	
—	Chinese Taipei	Yung-Kuei Chan; Chia-Hung Lin; Hsu Chia-wei	NM	
