= Mediterranean Athletics U23 Championships =

Biennial athletics competition

The Mediterranean Athletics U23 Championships is a biennial athletics competition open for under the age of 23 athletes of the opened to all affiliated Federations of the Mediterranean Athletics Union, who is the organizer. The event was first held in 2014. A Mediterranean Athletics U23 Indoor Championships was inaugurated five years later.

== Editions ==
Outdoor

#	Year	City	Country	Date
1	2014	Aubagne	France	14–15 June 2014
2	2016	Tunis	Tunisia	4–5 June 2016
3	2018	Jesolo	Italy	9–10 June 2018
	Cancelled due to the COVID-19 pandemic	La Nucía	Spain	6–7 June 2020
4	2022	Pescara	Italy	10–11 September 2022
5	2024	Ismailia	Egypt	18–19 May 2024

== Championship records ==
=== Men ===
Event	Record	Athlete	Nationality	Date	Meet	Place
100 m	10.07 (+1.1 m/s)	Amaury Golitin	France	2018	2018 Championships	Jesolo, Italy
200 m	20.49	Mickael-Meba Zeze	France	2016	2016 Championships	Tunis, Tunisia
400 m	45.55	Mohamed Fares Jlassi	Tunisia	2018	2018 Championships	Jesolo, Italy
800 m	1:47.79	Abdelssalam Ayouni	Tunisia	2016	2016 Championships	Tunis, Tunisia
1500 m	3:47.37	Iskander Jhinaoui	Tunisia	2018	2018 Championships	Jesolo, Italy
5000 m	14:11.58	Rui Pinto	Portugal	2014	2014 Championships	Aubagne, France
10,000 m	29:49.60	Mohamed Ali Jelloul	Spain	2016	2016 Championships	Tunis, Tunisia
110 m hurdles	13.64	Simon Krauss	France	2014	2014 Championships	Aubagne, France
400 m hurdles	50.52	Matteo Beria	Italy	2018	2018 Championships	Jesolo, Italy
3000 m steeplechase	8:49.96	Ali Messaoudi	Algeria	2016	2016 Championships	Tunis, Tunisia
High jump	2.19 m	Christian Falocchi	Italy	2018	2018 Championships	Jesolo, Italy
Pole vault	5.72 m	Kevin Menaldo	France	2014	2014 Championships	Aubagne, France
Triple jump	16.72 m	Quentin Mouyabi	France	2018	2018 Championships	Jesolo, Italy
Shot put	19.42 m	Mohamed Khalifa	Egypt	2016	2016 Championships	Tunis, Tunisia
Discus throw	62.03 m	Danijel Furtula	Montenegro	2014	2014 Championships	Aubagne, France
Hammer throw	77.08 m	Mihail Anastasakis	Greece	2016	2016 Championships	Tunis, Tunisia
Javelin throw	75.30 m	Nicolas Quijera	Spain	2016	2016 Championships	Tunis, Tunisia
10,000 m walk (track)	39:46	Francesco Fortunato	Italy	2016	2016 Championships	Tunis, Tunisia
4 × 100 m relay	39.12	Gautier Dautremer; Marvin René; Stuart Dutamby; Mickael-Meba Zeze	France	2016	2016 Championships	Tunis, Tunisia
4 × 400 m relay	3:05.07	Mattia Casarico; Andrea Romani; Edoardo Scotti; Giuseppe Leonardi	Italy	2018	2018 Championships	Jesolo, Italy

=== Women ===
Event	Record	Athlete	Nationality	Date	Meet	Place
100 m	11.28	Carole Zahi	France	2016	2016 Championships	Tunis, Tunisia
200 m	23.06	Jennifer Galais	France	2014	2014 Championships	Aubagne, France
400 m	52.89	Kellya Pauline	France	2018	2018 Championships	Jesolo, Italy
800 m	2:04.31	Elena Bellò	Italy	2018	2018 Championships	Jesolo, Italy
1500 m	4:14.20	Federica Del Buono	Italy	2014	2014 Championships	Aubagne, France
5000 m	16:13.04	Silvia Oggioni	Italy	2016	2016 Championships	Tunis, Tunisia
10,000 m	34:33.86	Esma Aydemir	Turkey	2014	2014 Championships	Aubagne, France
100 m hurdles	13.11	Laura Valette	France	2018	2018 Championships	Jesolo, Italy
400 m hurdles	56.67	Aurélie Chaboudez	France	2014	2014 Championships	Aubagne, France
3000 m steeplechase	9:57.37	Adva Cohen	Israel	2018	2018 Championships	Jesolo, Italy
High jump	1.92 m	Desirée Rossit	Italy	2016	2016 Championships	Tunis, Tunisia
Pole vault	4.35 m	Elen Klaountia Polak	Greece	2018	2018 Championships	Jesolo, Italy
Long jump	6.58 m	Rougui Sow	France	2016	2016 Championships	Tunis, Tunisia
Triple jump	13.95 m	Jeanine Assani-Issouf	France	2014	2014 Championships	Aubagne, France
Shot put	18.12 m	Emel Dereli	Turkey	2018	2018 Championships	Jesolo, Italy
Discus throw	58.49 m	Daisy Osakue	Italy	2018	2018 Championships	Jesolo, Italy
Hammer throw	66.37 m	Alexandra Tavernier	France	2014	2014 Championships	Aubagne, France
Javelin throw	57.23 m	Eda Tuğsuz	Turkey	2018	2018 Championships	Jesolo, Italy
10,000 m walk (track)	44:45.51	Laura García-Caro	Spain	2016	2016 Championships	Tunis, Tunisia
4 × 100 m relay	44.39	Caroline Chaillou; Cynthia Leduc; Maroussia Pare; Sarah Richard-Minghas	France	2018	2018 Championships	Jesolo, Italy
4 × 400 m relay	3:37.88	Alice Mangione; Elisabetta Vandi; Rebecca Borga; Virginia Troiani	Italy	2018	2018 Championships	Jesolo, Italy

== Medal table ==
Rank	Nation	Gold	Silver	Bronze	Total
1	France (FRA)	49	26	19	94
2	Italy (ITA)	27	38	30	95
3	Spain (ESP)	16	18	24	58
4	Turkey (TUR)	9	14	20	43
5	Tunisia (TUN)	4	10	8	22
6	Greece (GRE)	3	1	3	7
7	Egypt (EGY)	2	3	3	8
8	Algeria (ALG)	2	1	3	6
9	Cyprus (CYP)	2	1	0	3
10	Croatia (CRO)	1	3	2	6
11	Morocco (MAR)	1	2	3	6
12	Montenegro (MNE)	1	1	1	3
13	Libya (LBA)	0	1	0	1
13	Slovenia (SLO)	0	1	0	1
15	Lebanon (LIB)	0	0	1	1
15	Malta (MLT)	0	0	1	1
15	San Marino (SMR)	0	0	1	1
Totals (17 entries)		117	120	119	356
