= 2025 European Athletics U23 Championships – Men's 10,000 metres walk =

Men's 10,000 metres walk at the 2025 European Athletics U23 Championships
- Venue: Fana Stadion
- Location: Bergen, Norway
- Dates: 20 July
- Competitors: 33 from 15 nations
- Winning time: 39:45.84 PB

Medalists
gold medal	Mazlum Demir	Turkey
silver medal	Emiliano Brigante	Italy
bronze medal	Frederick Weigel	Germany

The men's 10,000 metres walk event at the 2025 European Athletics U23 Championships was held in Bergen, Norway, at Fana Stadion on 20 July.

== Results ==
Place	Athlete	Nation	Time	Notes
1st place, gold medalist(s)	Mazlum Demir	Turkey	39:45.84	PB
2nd place, silver medalist(s)	Emiliano Brigante	Italy	39:49.64	
3rd place, bronze medalist(s)	Frederick Weigel	Germany	40:00.90	PB
4	Nicola Lomuscio	Italy	40:19.25	PB
5	Mukola Rushchak	Ukraine	40:29.39	SB
6	Jaromír Morávek	Czech Republic	40:31.92	PB
7	Oscar Martinez	Spain	40:58.84	PB
8	Georgios Kritoulis	Greece	41:31.91	PB
9	Ellis Batifol	France	41:33.26	PB
10	Jassam Abu el Wafa	Germany	41:36.44	PB
11	Luigi Reis	Italy	41:38.87	PB
12	Tiago Ramos	Portugal	41:43.14	SB
13	Hugo Ellul	France	41:43.65	PB
14	Pedro Callado	Spain	41:56.74	
15	Harun Bilir	Turkey	42:35.31	=PB
16	Adam Zajíček	Czech Republic	42:36.41	
17	Andreas Papastergiou	Greece	42:43.21	PB
18	Quentin Chenuet	France	42:45.26	SB
19	Filip Krestianko	Slovakia	42:45.58	SB
20	Tomáš Mencel	Slovakia	43:03.75	PB
21	Tiago Sucena	Portugal	43:06.14	PB
22	Albert Kukla	Czech Republic	43:38.42	SB
23	Jakub Bátovský	Slovakia	43:44.01	SB
24	Jonathan Ekberg	Finland	44:19.43	
25	Matthew Glennon	Ireland	44:47.96	SB
26	Jake O'Brien	Ireland	45:30.46	PB
27	Dominik Barbużyński	Poland	45:45.76	
28	Aristotelis Bousdas	Greece	46:23.00	
29	Edmond Dobruna	Croatia	47:54.92	
30	Lukas Lasevičius	Lithuania	48:53.74	
31	Tauras Jokūbas Grincevičius	Lithuania	50:23.41	
—	Pablo Rodriguez Rojas	Spain	DNF	
—	Hayrettin Yildiz	Turkey	DNF	
