= 2016 Tunisian Athletics Championships =

- Dates: 15–17 July
- Host city: Radès
- Venue: Stade Olympique de Radès
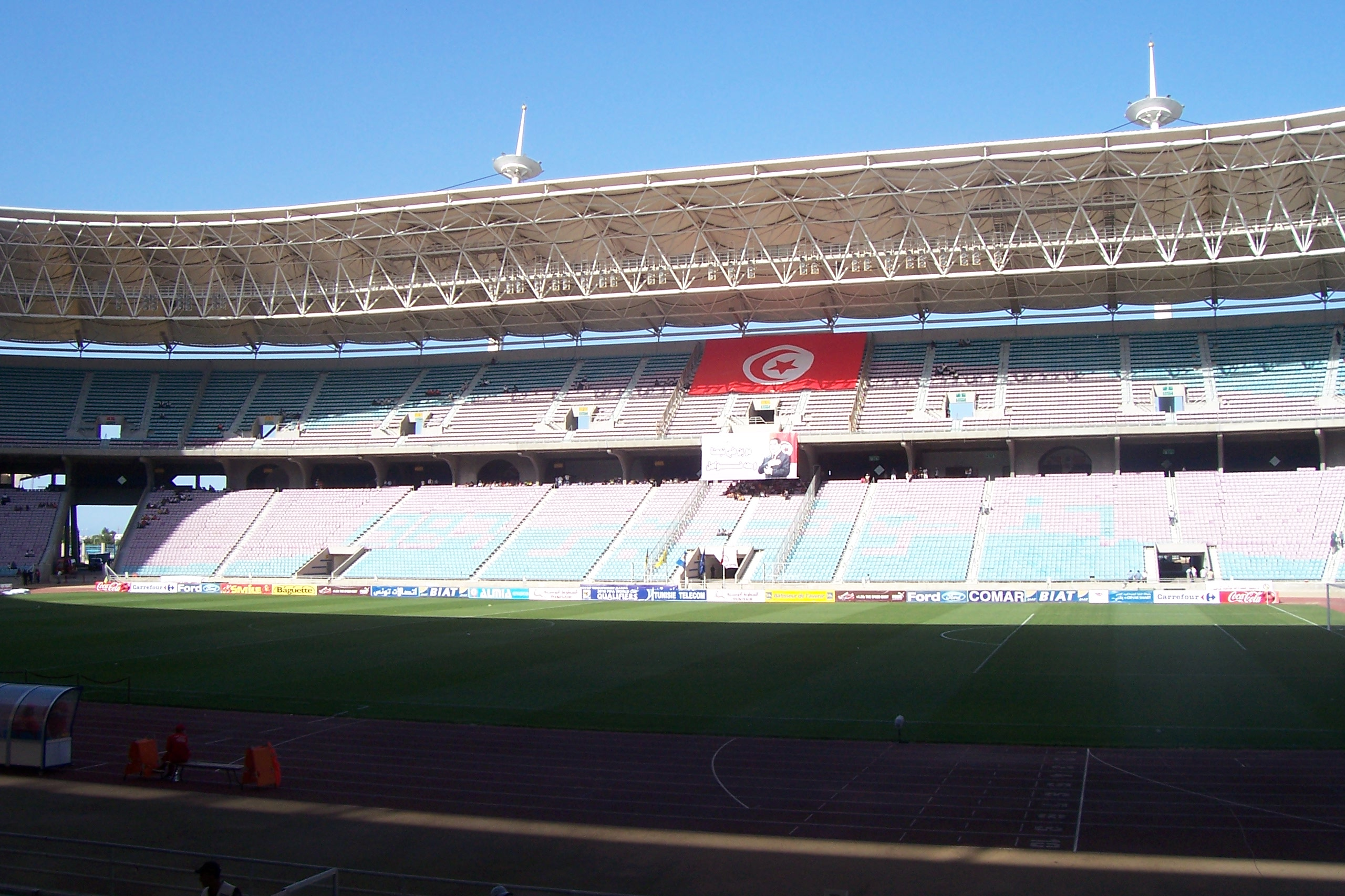

The 2016 Tunisian Athletics Championships was the year's national championship in outdoor track and field for Tunisia. It was held from 15 to 17 July at the Stade Olympique de Radès in Radès.

Several events were contested separately from the main championships: the combined track and field events were held on 16–17 April, the 10,000 metres on 21 May, and the road walking events in Korba, Tunisia on 20 March.

Nada Cheroudi broke the Tunisian national record in the women's heptathlon with a score of 5658 points. Mouna Jaidi dominated the women's throws, taking three of the four titles on offer. At the team level, the National Guard Sports Club won with 13 titles, followed by the Kairouan Municipal Athletics Club on 12 titles.

== Champions ==
| Event | Men | | Women | |
|---|---|---|---|---|
| 100 metres | Abdelkarim Bousalta | 11.08 | Abir Barkaoui | 12.47 |
| 200 metres | Akram Mehrez | 22.88 | Abir Barkaoui | 26.01 |
| 400 metres | Abdelaziz Rebii | 49.65 | Abir Barkaoui | 1:00.18 |
| 800 metres | Iskander Jhinaoui | 1:52.57 | Haifa Tarchoun | 2:14.15 |
| 1500 metres | Abderraouf Boubaker | 4:04.08 | Hallouma Jerfal | 4:38.45 |
| 5000 metres | Ahmed Jaziri | 14:53.20 | Oumaima Jemai | 18:01.00 |
| 10,000 metres | Wissem Hosni | 30:14.86 | Mahbouba Boubaker | 36:19.08 |
| 110/100 m hurdles | Rami Gharsalli | 14.18 | Nada Cheroudi | 14.73 |
| 400 m hurdles | Ali Said | 54.73 | Abir Barkaoui | 1:6.11 |
| 3000 m s'chase | Zied Ben Othman | 9:01.95 | Soumaya Dhahri | 11:43.21 |
| 4 × 100 m relay | Tunisian Military Association | 44.3 | Sfaxien Sports Club | 52.2 |
| 4 × 400 m relay | Sousse Athletics Club | 3:23.38 | Kairouan Municipal Athletics Club | 4:10.92 |
| Long jump | Marouane Mansour | 7.50 m | Chelbia Ben Salem | 5.69 m |
| Triple jump | Ghaith Bellakhal | 14.62 m | Fatma Lahmadi | 12.41 m |
| High jump | Fadi Chaheb | 2.00 m | Maroua Najjar | 1.56 m |
| Pole vault | Ramzi Ayari | 3.80 m | Nesrine Brinis | 3.70 m |
| Shot put | Wajdi Bellili | 14.82 m | Nada Cheroudi | 13.02 m |
| Discus throw | Mohamed Ali Mejri | 44.81 m | Mouna Jaidi | 45.03 m |
| Hammer throw | Mohsen Mohamed Anani | 65.27 m | Mouna Jaidi | 47.57 m |
| Javelin throw | Sadok Anani | 64.00 m | Mouna Jaidi | 40.84 m |
| Decathlon/Heptathlon | Aymen Hemissi | 5760 pts | Nada Cheroudi | 5658 pts |
| 20 km walk | Raouf Ben Baha | 1:37:17 | Chahinez Nasri | 1:45:27 |
