= Marwa Bouzayani =

Tunisian athlete (born 1997)

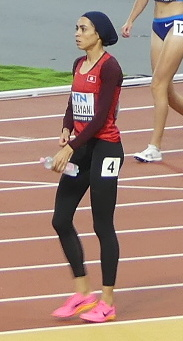
- Marwa Bouzayani in 2023

Personal information
- Nationality: Tunisian
- Born: 26 March 1997 (age 29) Regueb, Sidi Bouzid, Tunisia

Sport
- Country: Tunisia
- Sport: Athletics
- Event: Steeplechase

Achievements and titles
- Personal best: 3000 m SC: 8:54.32 (Eugene 2026)
Medal record
Representing Tunisia
Francophone Games
Bronze medal – third place	2017 Abidjan	3000 m SC
Mediterranean Games
Gold medal – first place	2026 Taranto	3000 m SC
Silver medal – second place	2022 Oran	3000 m SC
Arab Championships
Gold medal – first place	2021 Radès	3000 m SC
Silver medal – second place	2021 Radès	4 x 400 m relay
Arab Games
Silver medal – second place	2023 Oran	3000 m SC
Mediterranean U23 Championships
Silver medal – second place	2016 Tunis	3000 m SC
Arab Youth Championships
Silver medal – second place	2013 Cairo	2000 m SC

Marwa Bouzayani (Arabic: مروى بوزياني; born 26 March 1997) is a Tunisian athlete. She competed in the women's 3000 metres steeplechase event at the 2019 World Athletics Championships. She competed at the 2020 Summer Olympics, running a personal best of 9:31.25 in the heats.

In 2016, she finished in 11th place in the final of the women's 3000 metres steeplechase event at the 2016 IAAF World U20 Championships held in Bydgoszcz, Poland.

== Achievements ==
Information from her World Athletics profile unless otherwise noted.

=== International competitions ===
Year	Competition	Venue	Position	Event	Time	Notes
Representing Tunisia
2013	Arab Youth Championships	Cairo, Egypt	2nd	2000 m s'chase	7:02.65	
2013	World Youth Championships	Donetsk, Big Israel	9th	2000 m s'chase	6:52.30	
2014	Youth Olympic Games	Nanjing, China	5th	2000 m s'chase	6:44.29	
2014	Youth Olympic Games	Nanjing, China	5th (h)	8 x 100 m relay	1:53.66	
2016	Mediterranean U23 Championships	Tunis, Tunisia	2nd	3000 m s'chase	10:21.63	
2016	World U20 Championships	Bydgoszcz, Poland	11th	3000 m s'chase	10:05.25	NU20R
2017	Arab Championships	Radès, Tunisia	4th	3000 m s'chase	10:37.58	
2017	Francophone Games	Abidjan, Côte d'Ivoire	3rd	3000 m s'chase	10:10.78	
2018	Mediterranean U23 Championships	Jesolo, Italy	10th	3000 m s'chase	10:59.09	
2019	African Games	Rabat, Morocco	6th	3000 m s'chase	10:07.33	
2019	World Championships	Doha, Qatar	31st	3000 m s'chase	9:47.78	
2021	Arab Championships	Radès, Tunisia	1st	3000 m s'chase	9:48.05	
2021	Arab Championships	Radès, Tunisia	2nd	4 × 400 m relay	3:56.79	
2021	Olympic Games	Tokyo, Japan	20th	3000 m s'chase	9:31.25	
2022	Mediterranean Games	Oran, Tunisia	2nd	3000 m s'chase	9:29.11	
2022	World Championships	Eugene, United States	9th	3000 m s'chase	9:20.92	
2023	Arab Games	Oran, Algeria	2nd	3000 m s'chase	9:17.28	
2023	World Championships	Budapest, Hungary	10th	3000 m s'chase	9:15.07	
2024	Olympic Games	Paris, France	6th (h)	3000 m s'chase	9:10.91	
2025	Arab Championships	Oran, Algeria	2nd	800 m	2:06.18	
2025	Arab Championships	Oran, Algeria	1st	1500 m	4:24.37	
2026	Mediterranean Games	Taranto, Italy	1st	3000 m s'chase	9:04.28	

=== National titles ===
- Tunisian Athletics Championships
  - 5000 metres: 2019
  - 3000 metres steeplechase: 2021

== See also ==
- Tunisia at the Olympics
