= 2022 World Athletics U20 Championships – Men's 10,000 metres walk =

Men's 10,000 metres walk at the 2022 World Athletics U20 Championships
- Venue: Estadio Olímpico Pascual Guerrero
- Dates: 5 August
- Competitors: 28 from 18 nations
- Winning time: 42:36.02

Medalists
gold medal	Mazlum Demir	Turkey
silver medal	Ismail Ben Hammouda	Algeria
bronze medal	Hayrettin Yildiz	Turkey

The men's 10,000 metres race walk at the 2022 World Athletics U20 Championships was held at the Estadio Olímpico Pascual Guerrero in Cali, Colombia on 5 August 2022.

30 athletes from 19 countries were originally entered to the competition, however, 28 of them competed. Ahmed Mohamed Hanafi from Egypt and Babubhai Barjod from India did not participate.

== Records ==
U20 standing records prior to the 2022 World Athletics U20 Championships were as follows:

Record	Athlete & Nationality	Mark	Location	Date
World U20 Record	Viktor Burayev (RUS)	38:46.4	Moscow, Russia	20 May 2000
Championship Record	Daisuke Matsunaga (JPN)	39:27.19	Eugene, United States	25 July 2014
World U20 Leading	Mazlum Demir (TUR)	40:42.09	Bursa, Turkey	26 June 2022

== Results ==
The race (originally set for 9:35) was started at 9:38 on 5 August 2022. The results were as follows:

Rank	Name	Nationality	Time	Note
1st place, gold medalist(s)	Mazlum Demir	Turkey	42:36.02	
2nd place, silver medalist(s)	Ismail Ben Hammouda	Algeria	42:42.49	
3rd place, bronze medalist(s)	Hayrettin Yildiz	Turkey	43:07.95	~
4	Oussama Farhat	Tunisia	43:08.20	~ ~
5	Óscar Martínez	Spain	43:20.84	PB
6	Nicola Lomuscio	Italy	43:28.25	>
7	Pablo Pastor	Spain	43:34.39	PB ~
8	Saúl Wamputsrik	Ecuador	43:46.17	
9	Otavio Henrique	Brazil	43:47.28	~
10	Gabriel Alvarado	Nicaragua	44:01.91	~
11	Andreas Papastergiou	Greece	44:11.41	~
12	Mateo Romero	Colombia	44:21.40 (PZ60)	~ ~ ~
13	Jonathan Peña	Mexico	44:26.99	
14	Emiliano Brigante	Italy	44:42.04	>
15	Adam Zajíček	Czech Republic	44:45.52	
16	Tiago Ramos	Portugal	44:47.21	
17	Shotaro Shimoike	Japan	44:48.45	
18	Ángel Montes de Oca	Mexico	45:04.83	~ ~
19	Terry Villacorte	Ecuador	45:43.38	
20	Riku Ooie	Japan	45:53.21	
21	Usiel Caal	Guatemala	45:58.89	
22	Rohitkumar Vinodkumar Yadav	India	46:14.05	~
23	Andreas-Eleftherios Bachos	Greece	46:15.84	
24	Mykola Rushchak	Ukraine	46:42.36 (PZ60)	~ ~ ~
	Jaromír Morávek	Czech Republic	DNF	
	Heron Rodrigues Miranda	Brazil	DNF	~ ~
	Bryan Matías	Guatemala	DQ (TR54.7.5)	~ ~ ~ >
	Heristone Wafula	Kenya	DQ (TR54.7.5)	> ~ ~ ~

Key:	~ Red card for loss of contact	> Red card for bent knee	PZ60: 60sec Penalty Zone	TR54.7.5: Disqualified by Rule TR54.7.5 (4 red cards)
