= David Kenny (athlete) =

Irish racewalker

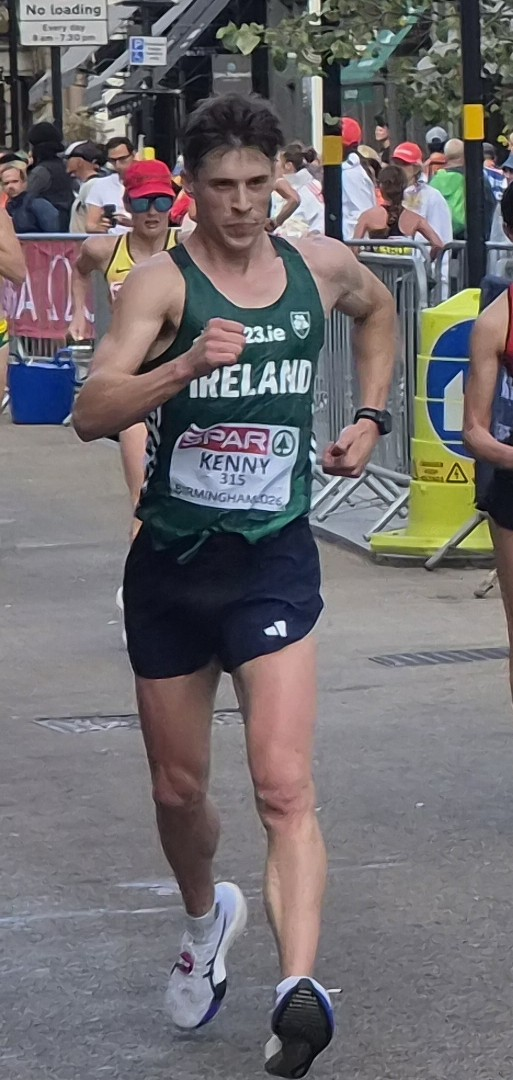
- 2026 European Championships

Personal information
- Nationality: Irish
- Born: 10 January 1999 (age 27)

Sport
- Country: Ireland
- Sport: Men's athletics
- Event: Racewalking
- Coached by: Jamie Costin
Medal record
Men's athletics
Representing Ireland
European U23 Championships
Silver medal – second place	2021 Tallinn	20 km walk

David Kenny (born 10 January 1999) is an Irish racewalking athlete. He represented Ireland at the 2020 Summer Olympics in the men's 20 kilometres walk.

== Career ==
Kenny represented Ireland at the 2019 European Athletics U23 Championships in the 20 kilometres walk and finished in ninth place with a personal best time of 1:25:43. He again represented Ireland at the 2021 European Athletics U23 Championships in the 20 kilometres walk and won a silver medal with a time of 1:25:50. This was Ireland's ninth medal at the European Athletics U23 Championships, and first-ever racewalking medal.

Kenny is coached by Jamie Costin. He represented Ireland at the 2020 Summer Olympics in the men's 20 kilometres walk and finished in 29th place.
