= Amira Ben Amor =

Tunisian long-distance runner

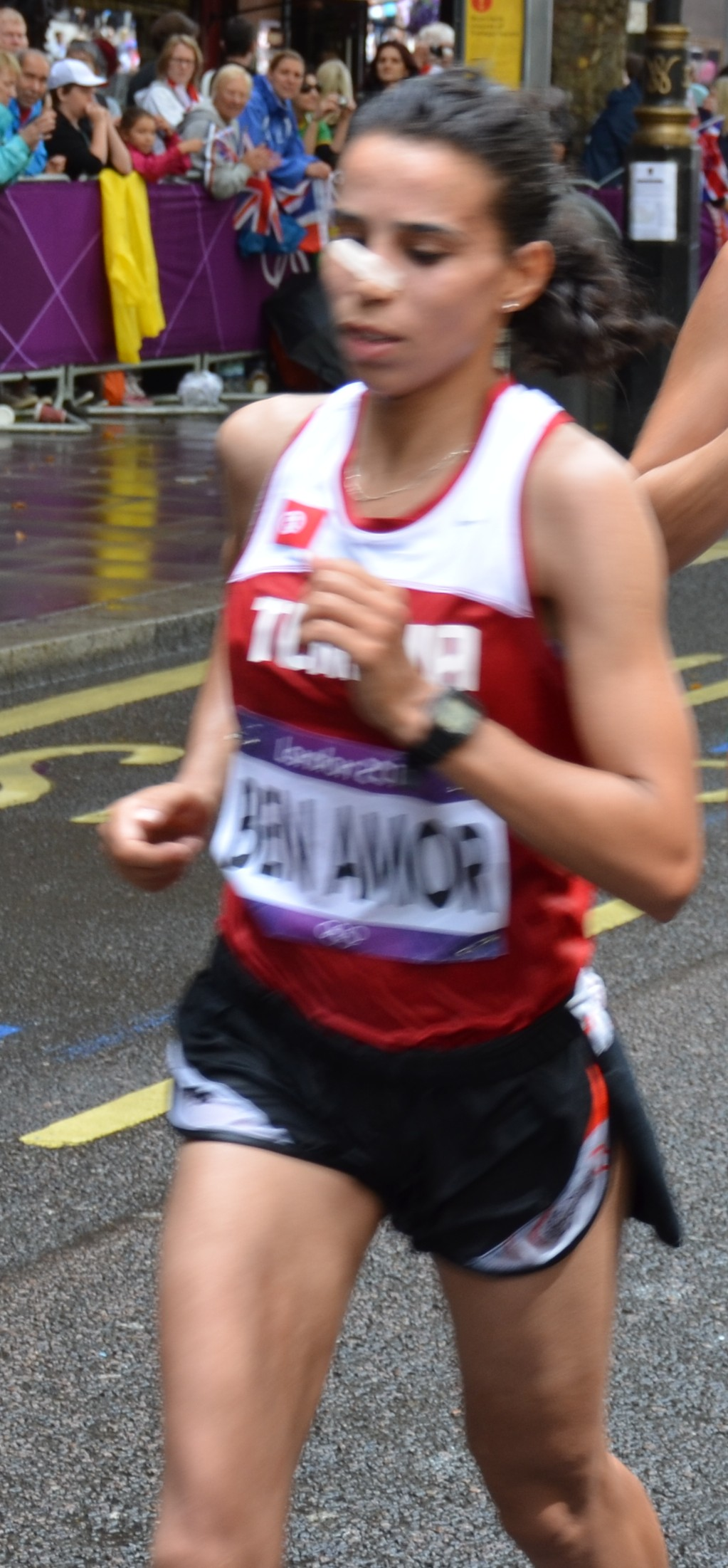
- Amira Ben Amor in the 2012 Summer Olympics marathon

Personal information
- Born: September 7, 1985 (age 40)
- Height: 1.68 m (5 ft 6 in)
- Weight: 49 kg (108 lb)

Sport
- Country: Tunisia
- Sport: Athletics
- Event: Marathon

Amira Ben Amor (born 7 September 1985, in Nabeul) is a Tunisian long-distance runner. She competed in the marathon at the 2012 Summer Olympics, placing 80th with a time of 2:40:13, which set the Tunisian national record.
