= 2022 Mediterranean Athletics U23 Championships =

- Dates: 10–11 September 2022
- Host city: Pescara, Italy
- Participation: 216 athletes from 17 nations

The 2022 Mediterranean Athletics U23 Championships was an athletics competition which was held in Pescara, Italy from 10 to 11 September 2022.

Italy topped the medal tables ahead of France and Turkey, with 20 gold medals.

== Medal summary ==
=== Men ===
Event	Gold		Silver		Bronze	
100m	Marco Ricci; Italy	10.36	Arnau Monné; Spain	10.50	Anthony Smith; Turkey	10.54
200m	Anthony Smith; Turkey	20.77	Mattia Donola; Italy	21.10	Jehan Anicet; France	21.37
400m	Matteo Raimondi; Italy	46.35	Rami Balti; Tunisia	46.69	Stefano Grendene; Italy	46.77
800m	Yanis Meziane; France	1:47.01	Zohair Hadar; Italy	1:47.05	David Barroso; Spain	1:47.71
1500m	Federico Riva; Italy	4:14.76	Mohamed Attaoui; Spain	4:15.43	Masresha Costa; Italy	4:15.71
5000m	Etienne Daguinos; France	14:25.84	Ramazan Baştuğ; Turkey	14:29.27	Adam Maijó Frígola; Spain	14:30.07
110mH	Lorenzo Simonelli; Italy	13.80	Giuseppe Mattia Filpi; Italy	13.94	Angel Diaz Rodriguez; Spain	13.97
400mH	Hugo Menin; France	51.09	Clément Ducos; France	51.25	Alberto Montanari; Italy	51.62
3000mSC	Baptiste Guyon; France	8:36.56	Enrico Vecchi; Italy	8:39.43	Baptiste Coudert; France	8:42.33
20 km Race Walk	Riccardo Orsoni; Italy	1:24:48	Aldo Andrei; Italy	1:28:54	Mazlum Demir; Turkey	1:32:20
4 × 100 m	Italy U23; Italy; Lorenzo Ianes; Mattia Donola; Federico Guglielmi; Marco Ricci	39.57	France U23; France; William Aguessy; Jerry Leconte; Sean Bermude; Maxime Lancelot	40.13	Spain U23; Spain; Arnau Monné; Andoni Calbano; Joseba Larrauri; Angel Diaz Rodriguez	40.32
Discus Throw	Enrico Saccomano; Italy	57.90 m	Carmelo Alessandro Musci; Italy	57.28 m	Enes Çankaya; Turkey	53.42 m
Hammer Throw	Jean-Baptiste Bruxelle; France	71.37 m	Giorgio Olivieri; Italy	71.09 m	Ioannis Korakidis; Greece	65.17 m
High Jump	Emir Rovčanin; Serbia	2.13 m	Manuel Lando; Italy	2.13 m	Paul Metayer; France	2.09 m
Javelin Throw	Teuraiterai Tupaia; France	73.53 m	Jhonatam Maullu; Italy	70.39 m	Mustafa Mahmoud Abdel Khaliq; Egypt	69.53 m
Long Jump	Jules Pommery; France	7.98 m	Iker Arotzena; Spain	7.60 m	Jacopo Quarratesi; Italy	7.50 m
Pole Vault	Baptiste Thiery; France	5.48 m	Matthias Orban; France	5.28 m	Simone Bertelli; Italy	5.18 m
Shot Put	Alperen Karahan; Turkey	19.15 m	Muhamet Ramadani; Kosovo	19.13 m	Riccardo Ferrara; Italy	18.50 m
Triple Jump	Simon Gore; France	16.43 m	Antonin Pauvarel; France	15.88 m	Enrico Montanari; Italy	15.60 m

=== Women ===
Event	Gold		Silver		Bronze	
100m	Chloé Galet; France	11.51	Mallory Leconte; France	11.58	Lucía Carrillo; Spain	11.62
200m	Gémima Joseph; France	23.43	Giorgia Bellinazzi; Italy	23.93	Serena Kouassi; France	24.18
400m	Alessandra Bonora; Italy	53.00	Elisabetta Vandi; Italy	53.41	Carmen Avilés; Spain	54.14
800m	Eloisa Coiro; Italy	2:07.55	Nina Vuković; Croatia	2:08.46	Julia Cherot; France	2:08.95
5000m	Aurora Bado; Italy	16:30.71	Michela Moretton; Italy	16:30.81	Carmen Riaño; Spain	16:32.85
100mH	Giulia Guarriello; Italy	13.27	Lea Vendôme; France	13.57	Veronica Besana; Italy	13.58
400mH	Alice Muraro; Italy	56.98	Louise Maraval; France	57.73	Carla García; Spain	58.30
3000mSC	Flavie Renouard; France	9:42.31	Rihab Dhahri; Tunisia	9:57.83	Floriane Quesada; France	10:09.60
20 km Race Walk	Vittoria Giordani; Italy	1:40:30	Mireia Urrutia; Spain	1:40:58	Alicia Lumbreras; Spain	1:43:12
4 × 400 m	Italy U23; Italy; Elisabetta Vandi; Eloisa Coiro; Ilaria Elvira Accame; Alessandra Bonora	3:34.25	Spain U23; Spain; Carla García; Daniela García; Jarraz el Ghaita; Carmen Avilés	3:43.21	France U23; France; Cassandra Delauney-Belleville; Louise Maraval; Camille Marsin; Isabelle Black	3:43.61
Discus Throw	Amanda Ngandu-Ntumba; France	55.09 m	Benedetta Benedetti; Italy	54.68 m	Marie Josee Bovele Linaka; France	53.28 m
Hammer Throw	Rachele Mori; Italy	65.60 m	Natalia Sánchez; Spain	62.98 m	Rawan Barakat; Egypt	62.16 m
High Jump	Asia Tavernini; Italy	1.85 m	Idea Pieroni; Italy	1.82 m	Léonie Cambours; France	1.75 m
Javelin Throw	Margherita Randazzo; Italy	53.38 m	Carolina Visca; Italy	53.31 m	Federica Botter; Italy	52.74 m
Long Jump	Maëlly Dalmat; France	6.46 m	Tiphaine Mauchant; France	6.38 m	Tessy Ebosele; Spain	6.31 m
Pole Vault	Giulia Valletti Borgnini; Italy	4.26 m	Elina Giallurachis; France	4.16 m	Maria Roberta Gherca; Italy	4.06 m
Shot Put	Anna Musci; Italy	15.52 m	Amanda Ngandu-Ntumba; France	14.88 m	Ludovica Montanaro; Italy	14.08 m
Triple Jump	Veronica Zanon; Italy	12.92 m	Maeva Dorsile; France	12.82 m	Deborah Tripodi; Italy	12.63 m

== Medal table ==
Rank	Nation	Gold	Silver	Bronze	Total
1	Italy (ITA)	20	15	11	46
2	France (FRA)	14	11	9	34
3	Turkey (TUR)	2	1	3	6
4	Serbia (SRB)	1	0	0	1
5	Spain (ESP)	0	6	10	16
6	Tunisia (TUN)	0	2	0	2
7	Croatia (CRO)	0	1	0	1
7	Kosovo (KOS)	0	1	0	1
9	Egypt (EGY)	0	0	2	2
10	Greece (GRE)	0	0	1	1
Totals (10 entries)		37	37	36	110
