= Sinan Ören =

Turkish footballer (born 1987)

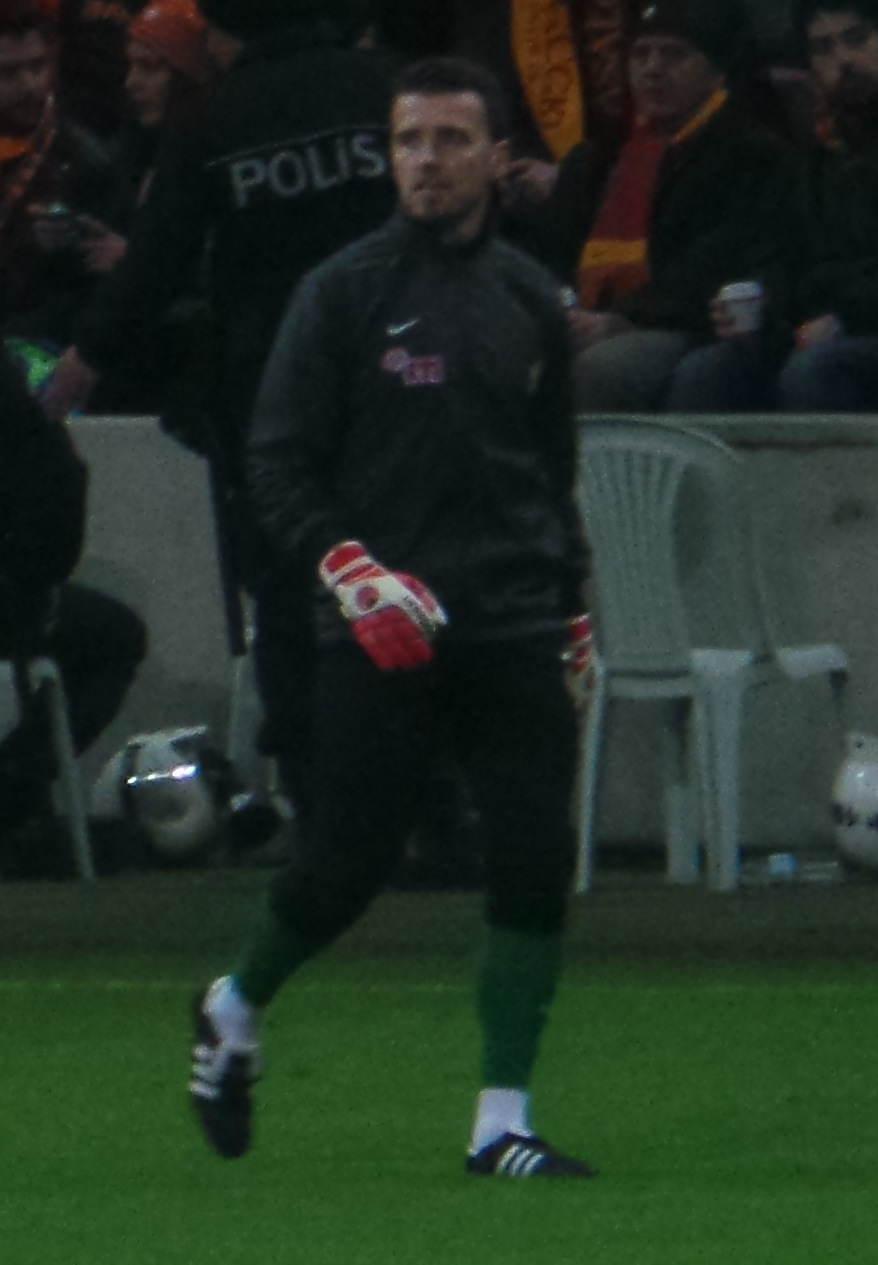
- Sinan Ören

Personal information
- Date of birth: 21 November 1987 (age 38)
- Place of birth: Eskişehir, Turkey
- Height: 1.85 m (6 ft 1 in)
- Position: Goalkeeper

Youth career
- 2000–2001: Sağlıkspor
- 2001–2004: Eskişehirspor

Senior career*
Years	Team	Apps	(Gls)
2004–2016	Eskişehirspor	28	(0)
2009–2010	→ Göztepe (loan)	19	(0)
2010–2011	→ Balıkesirspor (loan)	25	(0)
2016–2017	Şanlıurfaspor	25	(0)
2017–2022	Zonguldak Kömürspor	119	(0)

International career
2006	Turkey U19	1	(0)
- * Club domestic league appearances and goals as of 7 May 2022

Sinan Ören (born 21 November 1987) is a Turkish footballer who plays as a goalkeeper.

Ören appeared in seven Süper Lig matches during the 2008–09 season and ten TFF First League matches during the 2006–07 and 2007–08 seasons with Eskişehirspor.

He also is a nephew of the legendary goalkeeper of Eskişehirspor, Sinan Alağaç.
