= Desirée Rossit =

Italian high jumper (born 1994)

Personal information
- Nationality: Italian
- Born: 19 March 1994 (age 32) Udine, Italy
- Height: 181 cm (5 ft 11 in)
- Weight: 53 kg (117 lb)

Sport
- Country: Italy
- Sport: Track and field
- Event: High jump

Achievements and titles
- Personal best: 1.97 m (2016)

Desirée Rossit (born 19 March 1994) is an Italian former athlete who specialised in the high jump.

== Professional career ==
She competed in the 2016 Summer Olympics for Italy, qualifying for the finals and finishing 16th overall in the women's high jump.

== Personal bests ==
=== Outdoor ===
Event	Record	Venue	Date
High jump	1.97	Bressanone	10 June 2016

=== Indoor ===
Event	Record	Venue	Date
High jump	1.91	Pordenone	31 January 2015

== Achievements ==
Year	Competition	Venue	Position	Event	Measure	Notes
2014	Mediterranean U23 Championships	(France) Aubagne	1st	High jump	1.80 m	
2016	Mediterranean U23 Championships	(Tunisia) Tunis	1st	High jump	1.92 m	

== See also ==
- Italian all-time top lists - High jump
