= Paul McGrath (race walker) =

Spanish athlete (born 2002)

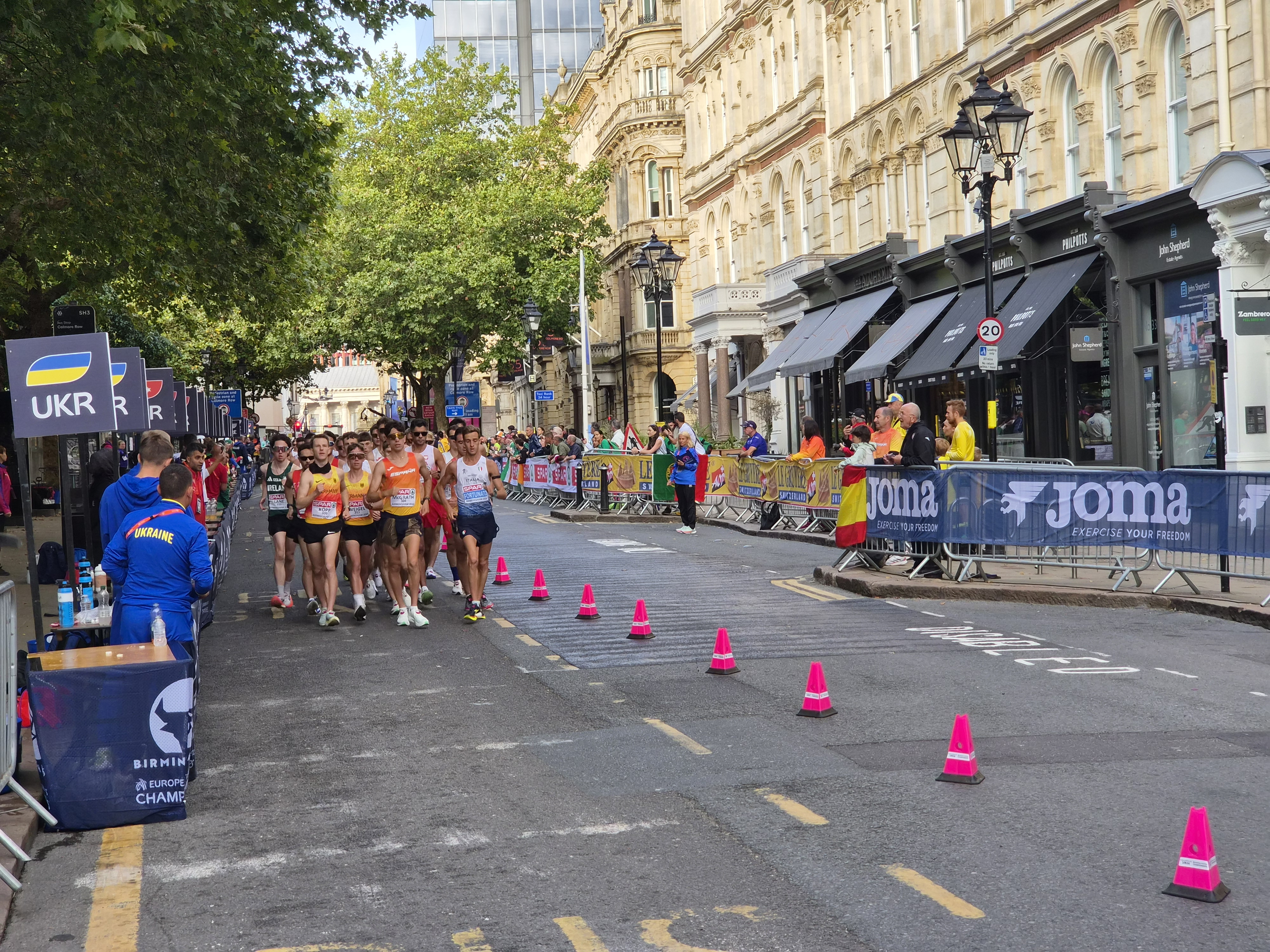
- McGrath in 2026

Personal information
- Full name: Paul McGrath Benito
- Nationality: Spanish
- Born: 7 March 2002 (age 24) Barcelona, Spain

Sport
- Sport: Athletics
- Event: Race Walking
Medal record
Men's athletics
Representing Spain
World Championships
| Bronze medal – third place | 2025 Tokyo | 20 km walk |
World Team Championships
| Gold medal – first place | 2024 Antalya | 20 km team |
| Silver medal – second place | 2024 Antalya | 20 km walk |
European Championships
| Gold medal – first place | 2026 Birmingham | Half marathon walk |
| Silver medal – second place | 2024 Rome | 20 km walk |
European Race Walking Team Championships
| Gold medal – first place | 2025 Poděbrady | 20 km walk |
European U23 Championships
| Gold medal – first place | 2023 Espoo | 20 km walk |
World U20 Championships
| Bronze medal – third place | 2021 Nairobi | 10 km walk |
European U20 Championships
| Gold medal – first place | 2021 Tallinn | 10 km walk |

Paul McGrath Benito (Note: In this Spanish name, the first or paternal surname is McGrath and the second or maternal family name is Benito.) (born 7 March 2002) is a Spanish race walker. He was the gold medalist at the 2026 European Athletics Championships in the half marathon race walk. He was previously a silver medalist at the 2024 European Championships and competed at the 2024 Olympic Games.

== Biography ==
McGrath won the 2021 European Athletics U20 Championships in Tallinn, Estonia in the 10,000 m race walk. He finished third at the 2021 World Athletics U20 Championships in Nairobi in the 10,000 m race walk.

McGrath finished third at the 20 km race walk on 13 February 2022 at the senior Spanish Championships in Pamplona.

McGrath won gold at the 2023 European Athletics U23 Championships in Espoo, Finland, in the 20,000 m race walk in a personal best of 1:21:03.

In April 2024, he was a silver medalist in the 20 km race at the World Athletics Race Walking Team Championships in Antalya, Turkey. That month, he won the Spanish national title in the 20 km race walk, setting a personal best time of 1:17:55 in Zaragoza. It placed him third on the Spanish all-time list.

McGrath was a silver medalist at the 2024 European Athletics Championships in Rome in June 2024. He was officially selected for the 2024 Paris Olympics in July 2024. Although he featured towards the front of the race at the start of the men's 20 km race in Paris, he eventually finished in seventeenth overall in a time of 1:20.32.

McGrath won his first major senior title in the men's 20 km race walk at the 2025 European Race Walking Team Championships in Podebrady, Czechia on 18 May 2025, winning the 20 km race walk title in a championship record of 1:18:05 and also led Spain to the team title. McGrath was selected for the Spanish team for the 2025 World Athletics Championships in Tokyo, Japan.

In July 2026, McGrath won the 10,000m race walk title at the Spanish Championships in a time of 38:23.52. On 15 August 2026, he won the gold medal in the half marathon at the 2026 European Athletics Championships in Birmingham, England.

== Personal life ==
McGrath was born and raised in Barcelona. He has a Spanish mother, a Scottish father, and Irish grandparents. His father, James, is from Glasgow, and a keen football fan; consequently McGrath is a supporter of Scottish Premiership football club Celtic and has been a season ticket holder.
