= Adıyaman University =

Public university in Adıyaman, Turkey

Coordinates: 37°44′38″N 38°13′54″E

- Adıyaman Üniversitesi
- Motto: Bilimle yüksel, geleceğe yön ver!
- Motto in English: Rise with Science, Shape the Future.
- Type: Public
- Established: 2006
- Rector: Mehmet Kelles
- Academic staff: 857
- Students: 20000+
- Location: Adıyaman, Turkey
- Website: Official website

Adıyaman University is a state university, established in 2006 in Adıyaman province, Turkey.

Adiyaman University consists of 4 campuses, Kahta Campus, Besni Campus and Gölbaşı Campus, with an area of 2 million 287 thousand m2 of total area.

== Departments ==
- Faculty of Engineering
- Faculty of Economics and Managerial Sciences
- Faculty of Science and Letters
- Faculty of Technology
- Faculty of Medicine
- Faculty of Educational Sciences
- Besni Vocational School
- Gölbaşı Vocational School
- Kahta Vocational School
- Adıyaman Vocational School

== Notable alumni ==
- Melike Günal (born 1998), female weightlifter
