= Andrea Cosi =

Italian athlete (born 2001)

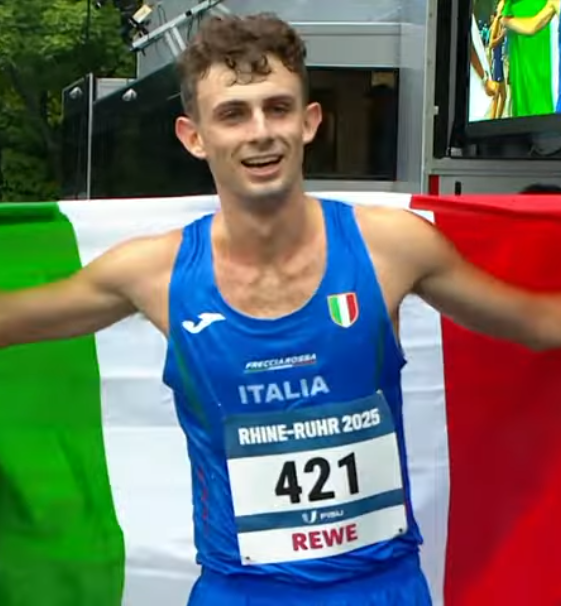
- Cosi in 2025

Personal information
- Born: 30 April 2001 (age 25)

Sport
- Sport: Athletics
- Event: Race Walking
Medal record
Men's athletics
Representing Italy
European Championships
Bronze medal – third place	2026 Birmingham	Half marathon walk
World University Games
Gold medal – first place	2025 Bochum	20 km walk
European U23 Championships
Silver medal – second place	2023 Espoo	20km walk
Bronze medal – third place	2021 Tallinn	20km walk

Andrea Cosi (born 30 April 2001) is an Italian race walker. He won the bronze medal in the half marathon race walk at the 2026 European Championships in Birmingham, England.

== Biography ==
From Florence, Cosi works as a member of the Carabinieri. Cosi won the bronze medal at the 2021 European Athletics U23 Championships in Tallinn, Estonia. He was a silver medalist behind Paul McGrath of Spain at the 2023 European Athletics U23 Championships in Espoo, Finland.

Cosi won the gold medal at the Athletics at the 2025 Summer World University Games in Germany in the 20 kilometres walk, breaking a 12-year-old Games record. His victory in 1:19:48 took 59 seconds off the previous best time.

Cosi won the bronze medal in the half marathon race walk at the 2026 European Championships in Birmingham, England on 15 August 2026.
