= Linha Ahmed =

Egyptian hurdler (born 1997)

Linha Amer Jaber Ahmed
Personal information
- Nationality: Egyptian
- Born: 11 March 1997 (age 28)

Sport
- Sport: Hurdling
- Event: 100 metres hurdles

Linha Amer Jaber Ahmed (born 11 March 1997) is an Egyptian hurdler. She competed in the women's 100 metres hurdles at the 2017 World Championships in Athletics.
