= 2016 Mediterranean Athletics U23 Championships =

II Mediterranean Athletics U23 Championships
- Dates: 4–5 June 2016
- Host city: Tunis, Tunisia
- Events: 42
- Participation: 27 nations

The 2016 Mediterranean Athletics U23 Championships was an athletics competition which was held in Tunis (Stadium in Radès), Tunisia, from 4 to 5 June 2016. A total of 42 events were contested, of which 21 were contested by male and 21 by female athletes. A total of 27 nations participated in the championships.

== Medal summary ==
=== Men ===
Event	Gold		Silver		Bronze	
100 metres (wind +2,3)	Stuart Dutamby; France	10,23	Marvin René; France	10,35	Lorenzo Bilotti; Italy	10,48
200 metres (vind +0,1)	Mickael-Meba Zeze; France	20,49	Simone Tanzilli; Italy	20,90	Gautier Dautremer; France	21,03
400 metres	Giuseppe Leonardi; Italy	46,66	Batuhan Altıntaş; Turkey	47,36	Ali Seayed; Tunisia	48,81
800 metres	Abdessalem Ayouni; Tunisia	1:47,79	Riadh Chenenni; Tunisia	1:48,04	Saul Ordonez; Spain	1:48,12
1500 metres	Abdessalem Ayouni; Tunisia	4:09,39	Bekmezci Suleyman; Turkey	4:09,56	Jesus Ramos; Spain	4:09,66
5000 metres	Bekmezci Suleyman; Turkey	14:41,03	Artur Bossy; Spain	14:41,42	Nadir Gouasmia; Algeria	14:42,45
10,000 metres	Mohamed Ali Jelloul; Spain	29:49,60	Alessandro Giacobazzi; Italy	29:50,01	Ismael Quinones; Spain	30:07,84
110 metres hurdles	Wilhem Belocian; France	13,70	Benjamin Sedecias; France	13,87	Javier Colomo; Spain	13,93
400 metres hurdles	Javier Delgado; Spain	50,73	Mattia Contini; Italy	51,29	Unsal Enes; Turkey	51,63
3000 metres steeplechase	Ali Messaoudi; Algeria	8:49,96	MLTek Ben Amor; Tunisia	8:53,53	Ibrahim Chakir; Spain	8:56,08
4 × 100 metres relay	France; Gautier Dautremer; Marvin René; Stuart Dutamby; Mickael-Meba Zeze	39,12	Italy; Simone Pettenati; Lorenzo Bilotti; Pietro Pivotto; Simone Tanzilli	39,69	Spain; Mauro Triana; Daniel Cerdan; Juan Ignacio Lopez; Javier Colomo	42,00
4 × 400 metres relay	Tunisia; Ali Said; Riadh Chenenni; Fakhreddine Selliti; Abdessalem Ayouni	3:13,44	Spain; Ryan Wallis; Saul Ordonez; Daniel Cerdan; Javier Delgado	3:13,73	not assigned	N/A
10,000 metres race walk	Francesco Fortunato; Italy	39:46,25	Jean Blancheteau; France	40:23,25	Diego García; Spain	41:13,98
High jump	Eugenio Meloni; Italy	2,18	Carlos Rojas; Spain	2,08	Alperen Acet; Turkey	2,08
Pole vault	Mathieu Collet; France	5,51	Axel Chapelle; France	5,41	Alessandro Sinno; Italy	5,26
Long jump	Marcell Jacobs; Italy	7,95	Mohcin Lakhoua; Morocco	7,86	Filippo Randazzo; Italy	7,75
Triple jump	Melvin Raffin; France	16,47	Jean-Noel Cretinoir; France	16,22	Marouane Aissaoui; Morocco	16,17
Shot put	Mohamed Magdi Hamza Khalif; Egypt	19,42	Sebastiano Bianchetti; Italy	18,77	Tomas Durovic; Montenegro	18,07
Discus throw	Martin Pilato; Italy	54,92	Antoniou Rafail; Cyprus	54,41	Moaaz Elsergany; Egypt	51,05
Hammer throw	Mihail Anastasakis; Greece	77,08	Baltaci Ozhan; Turkey	71,27	Islam Ibrahim; Egypt	70,33
Javelin throw	Nicolas Quijera; Spain	75,30	Paraskevas Batzavalis; Greece	74,50	Oncel Emin; Turkey	73,90

=== Women ===
Event	Gold		Silver		Bronze	
100 metres (wind +1,1)	Carolle Zahi; France	11,28	Floriane Gnafoua; France	11,38	Charlotte Wingfield; Malta	11,70
200 metres (wind +1,3)	Maroussia Pare; France	23,51	Bassant Hemida; Egypt	23,64	Assia Raziki; Morocco	23,77
400 metres	Déborah Sananes; France	53,04	Raphaela Boaheng Lukudo; Italy	53,47	Ilenia Vitale; Italy	53,94
800 metres	Eleonora Vandi; Italy	2:07,51	Joyce Mattagliano; Italy	2:08,15	Arik Asli; Turkey	2:08,59
1500 metres	Johanna Geyer Carles; France	4:15,61	Oumaima Saoud; Morocco	4:18,25	Arik Asli; Turkey	4:24,15
10,000 metres	Sonia Ferreira; Portugal	36:30,37	Tuna Emine Hatun; Turkey	36:34,81	Soumaya Dhahri; Tunisia	37:10,10
100 metres hurdles (wind: +2,0)	Lina Ahmed; Egypt	13,89	Houda Hagras; Egypt	14,40	Christelle El Saneh; Lebanon	15,48
400 metres hurdles	Alena Hrusoci; Croatia	58,65	Valentina Cavalleri; Italy	58,68	Yildirim Derya; Turkey	1:00,70
3000 metres steeplechase	Ryma Chenah; Algeria	10:06,96	Marwa Bouzayani; Tunisia	10:21,63	Isabel Mattuzzi; Italy	10:25,65
4 × 100 metres relay	France; Floriane Gnafoua; Carolle Zahi; Maroussia Pare; Caroline Chaillou	45,69	Tunisia; Chalbiya Ben Salem; Eya Roumthani; Hmad Semeh; Jihene Laabidi	49,54	not assigned	N/A
4 × 400 metres relay	Italy; Ilenia Vitale; Irene Morelli; Virginia Trolani; Raphaela Boaheng Lukudo	3:38,62	Turkey; Berfe Sancak; Kaya Ruya; Yildirim Busra; Yildirim Derya	3:48,95	Tunisia; Oumaima Jamai; Hala Hamdi; Soumaya Dhahri; Chiraz Goumni	4:15,71
10 000 metres race walk	Laura García-Caro; Spain	44:45,51	Chahinez Nasri; Tunisia	45:54,90	Lidia Sánchez-Puebla; Spain	46:18,67
High jump	Desiree Rossit; Italy	1,92	Erica Furlani; Italy	1,90	Nawal Meniker; France	1,85
Pole vault	Ninon Guillon-Romarin; France	4,16	Parlak Demet; Turkey	4,16	Helen Falda; Italy	4,01
Long jump	Rougui Sow; France	6,58	Neja Filipič; Slovenia	6,20	Ottavia Cestonaro; Italy	6,08
Triple jump	Rouguy Diallo; France	13,63	Ottavia Cestonaro; Italy	12,99	Benedetta Cuneo; Italy	12,81
Shot put	Maria Belen Toimil; Spain	16,30	Rose Sharon Pierre Louis; France	15,98	Claudia Bertoletti; Italy	15,08
Discus throw	Andrea Alarcon; Spain	54,18	Retag Asaiah; Libya	52,04	Paula Ferrandiz; Spain	51,29
Hammer throw	Iliana Korosidou; Greece	64,96	Camille Sainte-Luce; France	64,07	Maria Barbaño Acededo; Spain	59,75
Javelin throw	Tugsuz Eda; Turkey	56,88	Margaux Nicollin; France	56,21	Paola Padovan; Italy	54,99

== Medal table ==
Host

Rank	Nation	Gold	Silver	Bronze	Total
1	France	14	10	2	26
2	Italy	8	10	9	27
3	Spain	6	3	10	19
4	Tunisia*	3	4	3	10
5	Turkey	2	6	7	15
6	Egypt	2	2	2	6
7	Greece	2	1	0	3
8	Algeria	2	0	1	3
9	Croatia	1	0	0	1
9	Portugal	1	0	0	1
11	Morocco	0	2	2	4
12	Cyprus	0	1	0	1
12	Libya	0	1	0	1
12	Slovenia	0	1	0	1
15	Lebanon	0	0	1	1
15	Malta	0	0	1	1
15	Montenegro	0	0	1	1
Totals (17 entries)		41	41	39	121
