= Tunisian Athletics Championships =

Annual outdoor track and field competition

- Sport: Athletics
- Founded: 1956
- Country: Tunisia

The Tunisian Athletics Championships (Arabic: بطولة تونس لألعاب القوى) is an annual outdoor track and field competition organised by the Tunisian Athletics Federation, which serves as the national championship for the sport in Tunisia.

== Events ==
The competition programme features a total of 34 individual Tunisian Championship athletics events, 17 for men and 17 for women. There are six track running events, three obstacle events, four jumps, and four throws.

Track running

- 100 metres, 200 metres, 400 metres, 800 metres, 1500 metres, 3000 metres (women only) 5000 metres (men only)

Obstacle events

- 100 metres hurdles (women only), 110 metres hurdles (men only), 400 metres hurdles, 3000 metres steeplechase

Jumping events

- Pole vault, high jump, long jump, triple jump

Throwing events

- Shot put, discus throw, javelin throw, hammer throw

Combined events

- Heptathlon (women only), decathlon (men only)

In addition to the individual track and field titles, there are national championships in 20 kilometres race walk (both individual and relay), club relay championships (4 × 100 m, 4 × 200 m, 4 × 400 m, 4 × 800 m, and 4 × 1 500 m), road running championships over 10K run, half marathon and marathon distances, and long and short course cross country running competitions.

== Winners ==
The national club competition takes place within the individual national championships, with the club with the most successful athletes winning the national club title.

- 1956 : L'Orientale
- 1957 : Joyeuse union
- 1958 : Club sportif des cheminots
- 1959 : L'Orientale
- 1960 : L'Orientale
- 1961 : L'Orientale
- 1962 : Centre d'éducation physique militaire
- 1963 : Zitouna Sports
- 1964 : L'Orientale
- 1965 : Zitouna Sports
- 1966 : L'Orientale
- 1967 : Club africain
- 1968 : Zitouna Sports
- 1969 : Club africain
- 1970 : Club africain
- 1971 : Club africain
- 1972 : Club africain
- 1973 : Zitouna Sports
- 1974 : Zitouna Sports
- 1975 : Zitouna Sports
- 1976 : Zitouna Sports
- 1977 : Zitouna Sports
- 1978 : Zitouna Sports
- 1979 : Zitouna Sports
- 1980 : Zitouna Sports
- 1981 : Zitouna Sports
- 1982 : Zitouna Sports
- 1983 : Zitouna Sports
- 1984 : Zitouna Sports
- 1985 : Zitouna Sports
- 1986 : Zitouna Sports
- 1987 : Zitouna Sports
- 1988 : Zitouna Sports
- 1989 : Club sportif de la Garde nationale
- 1990 : Athletic Club de Nabeul
- 1991 : Club sportif de la Garde nationale et Athletic Club de Nabeul
- 1992 : Club sportif de la Garde nationale
- 1993 : Club sportif de la Garde nationale
- 1994 : Club sportif de la Garde nationale
- 1995 : Athletic Club de Nabeul
- 1996 : Club sportif de la Garde nationale
- 1997 : Club sportif de la Garde nationale
- 1998 : Club sportif de la Garde nationale
- 1999 : Club sportif de la Garde nationale
- 2000 : Club sportif de la Garde nationale
- 2001 : Club sportif de la Garde nationale
- 2002 : Club sportif de la Garde nationale
- 2003 : Club sportif de la Garde nationale
- 2004 : Club sportif de la Garde nationale
- 2005 : Club sportif de la Garde nationale
- 2006 : Club sportif de la Garde nationale
- 2007 : Club sportif de la Garde nationale
- 2008 : Club sportif de la Garde nationale
- 2009 : Club sportif de la Garde nationale
- 2010 : Club sportif de la Garde nationale
- 2011 : Zitouna Sports
- 2012 : Club sportif de la Garde nationale
- 2013 : Club municipal d'athlétisme de Kairouan
- 2014 : Club municipal d'athlétisme de Kairouan
- 2015 : Athletic Club de Sousse
- 2016 : Club sportif de la Garde nationale

== Championships records ==
=== Men ===
Event	Record	Athlete/Team	Date	Place	Ref.
100 m					

=== Women ===
Event	Record	Athlete/Team	Date	Place	Ref.
100 m					
5000 m	15:29.14	Marwa Bouzayani	8 June 2024	Radès	
