= Mazlum Demir =

Turkish racewalker (born 2003)

Personal information
- National team: Turkish
- Born: 19 December 2003 (age 22) Batman, Turkey
- Education: Sport coaching at Adıyaman University

Sport
- Country: Turkey
- Sport: Athletics
- Event: racewalking
Medal record
Men's racewalking
Representing Turkey
Balkan Race Walking Championships
Gold medal – first place	2023 Antalya	20 km walk
Mediterranean U23 Championships
Bronze medal – third place	2022 Oran	20 km walk
World U20 Championships
Gold medal – first place	2022 Cali	10,000 m walk

Mazlum Demir (born 19 December 2003) is a Turkish racewalker who specializes in the 10,000 m walk and 20 km walk. He has champion titles in the 10,000 m event of the World U20 Championship and 20 km event of the Balkan Championship.

== Sport career ==
Demir is coached by Sadullah Ergün in his hometown.

=== 2022 ===
He won the gold medal in the 10,000 m walk event at the 2022 World U20 Championships in Cali, Colombia.

Demir received the bronze medal in the 20 km race walk event at the 2022 Mediterranean U23 Championships in Oran, Algeria.

=== 2023 ===
He finished the 20 km individual event at the 2023 European Race Walking Team Championships in Poděbrady, Czech Republic on 17th place.

He took the gold medal in the 20 km event with 1:25:38 at the 2023 Balkan Race Walking Championships in Antalya, Turkey.

He competed in the 20 km walkevent at the 2023 European U23 Championships in Espoo, Finland, and was disqualified.

=== 2024 ===
End January 2024, Demir became Turkish champion in the 20 km walk event.

He finished the 20 km walk event at the 2024 European Championships in Rome, Italy with 1:26.33 in the 24th place.

He competed at the Grande Prémio Internacional de Rio Maior em Marcha Atlética Meeting of the Gold Competition Group of the World Athletics Race Walking Tour in Rio Maior, Portugal, and placed fourth in 1:22:11. This result enabled him to qualify for participation in the mixed marathon walk relay event alongside teammate Ayşe Tekdal (born 1999) at the 2024 Summer Olympics in Paris, France.

== Personal life ==
Mazlum Demir was born in Batman, Turkey on 19 December 2003. He completed his secondary education at Batman Sports High School. He is a student of sport coaching in the Faculty of Sport science at Adıyaman University.
