= Pan American Race Walking Cup =

Biennial competition

The Pan American Race Walking Cup (Spanish: Copa Panamericana de Marcha) is a biennial race walking competition for athletes representing countries from the Americas, organized by the Association of Panamerican Athletics (APA). It was established in 1984 and has featured races for senior men and women, and for junior athletes. The women competed in the 10 km road race until 1996, and then switched to the 20 km road race. In addition, there are separate team competitions. The 2001 event was held in conjunction with the South American Race Walking Cup. In 2011, the organization of the event was transferred from the Pan American Athletics Commission, a subdivision of the Pan American Sports Organization (PASO), to the newly constituted APA.

The events between 1984 and 2007 are documented in great detail in Spanish (including many historical fotos) by then President of the Pan American Race Walking Committee Rubén Pedro Aguilera from Argentina and is available from the APA website.

== History ==
During the 1983 Pan American Games in Caracas, Venezuela, the chief judge Palle Lassen from Denmark, then president of the IAAF race walking committee met with regional officials, namely the president of the Pan American Athletics Commission, Amadeo Francis from Puerto Rico, César Moreno Bravo from Mexico, and Jerzy Hausleber, the famous Polish coach of the Mexican racewalkers, as well as Rubén Aguilera (Argentina), Francesco Alongi (USA), Julián Díaz Rodríguez (Cuba), José Clemente Gonçalves (Brazil), Luigi Giordano (Canada), Alfonso Marques de la Mora (Mexico) and Oscar Suman Carrillo (Panamá). As a result, they proposed to create an international event to intensify the development of racewalking in the Americas. Further technical details for the future Pan American Race Walking Cup were cleared during the 1983 Ibero-American Championships in Athletics in Barcelona, Spain, later that year. Only one year later, the inaugural competition took place in Bucaramanga, Colombia. The site was chosen because its central location within the Americas, and moreover, race walking was already successfully practiced here.

== Host cities ==
Year	City	Country	Date
1984	Bucaramanga, Santander	Colombia	November 3–4
1986	Saint-Léonard, Québec	Canada	October 3–4
1988	Mar del Plata, Buenos Aires	Argentina	November 12–13
1990	Xalapa, Veracruz	Mexico	October 27–28
1992	Guatemala City	Guatemala	October 17–18
1994	Atlanta, Georgia	United States	September 23–24
1996	Manaus, Amazonas	Brazil	September 21–22
1998	Miami, Florida	United States	October 3–4
2000	Poza Rica, Veracruz	Mexico	April 8–9
2001	Cuenca, Azuay	Ecuador	October 27–28
2003	Chula Vista, California (20 km)	United States	March 15
2003	Tijuana, Baja California (50 km)	Mexico	March 9
2005	Lima	Peru	May 7–8
2007	Balneário Camboriú, Santa Catarina	Brazil	April 21–22
2009	San Salvador	El Salvador	May 1–2
2011	Envigado, Antioquia	Colombia	March 26–27
2013	Guatemala City	Guatemala	May 25–26
2015	Arica	Chile	May 9–11
2017	Lima	Peru	May 13–14
2019	Lazaro Cardenas	Mexico	April 20–21
2023	Managua	Nicaragua	April 15–16

== Results ==
Gold medal winners were published. The results for the Mexican athletes were published by the Federation of Mexican Athletics Associations (FMAA). On overview for the years 1984-2005 was given. Further results were assembled from other sources. More recently, complete results for the period 1984 to 2007 were published.

=== Men's results ===
==== 20 kilometres men ====
Year	Gold		Silver		Bronze	
1984	Querubín Moreno (COL)	1:25:19	Guillaume LeBlanc (CAN)	1:27:06	Héctor Moreno (COL)	1:27:09
1986	Guillaume LeBlanc (CAN)	1:21:13	Carlos Mercenario (MEX)	1:21:33	Tim Lewis (USA)	1:21:48
1988	Carlos Mercenario (MEX)	1:24:00	Ernesto Canto (MEX)	1:25:15	Guillaume LeBlanc (CAN)	1:27:08
1990	Ernesto Canto (MEX)	1:21:46	Joel Sánchez (MEX)	1:22:09	Carlos Mercenario (MEX)	1:22:25
1992	Bernardo Segura (MEX)	1:24:09	Daniel García (MEX)	1:25:34	Alberto Cruz (MEX)	1:28:32
1994	Bernardo Segura (MEX)	1:24:15	Daniel García (MEX)	1:24:34	Jefferson Pérez (ECU)	1:24:34
1996	Daniel García (MEX)	1:27:29	Julio René Martínez (GUA)	1:28:47	Miguel Ángel Rodríguez (MEX)	1:29:06
1998	Ignacio Zamudio (MEX)	1:28:33	Daniel García (MEX)	1:29:58	Joel Sánchez (MEX)	1:30:23
2000^{†}	Bernardo Segura (MEX)	1:22:47	Noé Hernández (MEX)	1:22:47	Jefferson Pérez (ECU)	1:24.36
2001	Alejandro López (MEX)	1:25:25	Jefferson Pérez (ECU)	1:26:21	Jesús Sánchez (MEX)	1:28:30
2003	Jefferson Pérez (ECU)	1:23:12	Cristian Berdeja (MEX)	1:24:17	Cristián Muñoz (CHI)	1:24:34
2005	Rolando Saquipay (ECU)	1:19:21	Luis Fernando López (COL)	1:20:26	Sérgio Galdino (BRA)	1:21:29
2007	Jefferson Pérez (ECU)	1:25:08	Gustavo Restrepo (COL)	1:25:09	Luis Fernando López (COL)	1:25:25
2009	Luis Fernando López (COL)	1:22:18	James Rendón (COL)	1:23:21	Omar Segura (MEX)	1:23:49
2011	Luis Fernando López (COL)	1:25:04	Érick Barrondo (GUA)	1:25:56	Giovanni Torres (MEX)	1:26:18
2013	Diego Flores (MEX)	1:24:16	José Leonardo Montaña (COL)	1:24:35	Caio Bonfim (BRA)	1:25:27
2015	Érick Barrondo (GUA)	1:21:25	Caio Bonfim (BRA)	1:21:26	Iván Garrido (COL)	1:21:39
2017	Éider Arévalo (COL)	1:21:01	Benjamin Thorne (CAN)	1:21:16	Omar Pineda (MEX)	1:22:00

^{†}: In 2000, the Mexican Athletics Federation used the event as trials for the Olympic Games in Sydney. Cristian Berdeja from Mexico started out of competition and came in third in 1:23.46.

==== 50 kilometres men ====
Year	Gold		Silver		Bronze	
1984	Pedro Aroche (MEX)	4:12:44	Víctor Sánchez (MEX)	4:17:52	Ignacio Buendía (MEX)	4:18:41
1986	Martín Bermúdez (MEX)	3:56:21	Marco Evoniuk (USA)	4:05:56	Hugo López (MEX)	4:07:53
1988	Martín Bermúdez (MEX)	4:03:20	Arturo Bravo (MEX)	4:06:55	Víctor Sánchez (MEX)	4:10:26
1990	Martín Bermúdez (MEX)	3:51:30	Francisco Reyes (MEX)	3:59:34	José Víctor Alonzo (GUA)	4:03:38
1992	Germán Sánchez (MEX)	4:06:21	Miguel Ángel Rodríguez (MEX)	4:06:21	Carlos Mercenario (MEX)	4:06:21
1994	Carlos Mercenario (MEX)	3:52:06	Miguel Ángel Rodríguez (MEX)	3:52:06	Germán Sánchez (MEX)	4:03:07
1996	Germán Sánchez (MEX)	4:12:43	Rubén Arikado (MEX)	4:14:17	Joel Sánchez (MEX)	4:22:17
1998	Carlos Mercenario (MEX)	4:06:38	Rubén Arikado (MEX)	4:12:01	Rogelio Sánchez (MEX)	4:17:18
2000^{†}	Miguel Ángel Rodríguez (MEX)	3:43:52	Joel Sánchez (MEX)	3:47:55	Carlos Mercenario (MEX)	3:50:28
2001	Edgar Hernández (MEX)	4:05:24	Fernando Guerrero (MEX)	4:07:14	Germán Sánchez (MEX)	4:09:24
2003^{‡}	Germán Sánchez (MEX)	4:04:11	Philip Dunn (USA)	4:15:01	Cristián Bascuñán (CHI)	4:19:27
2005	Miguel Solís (MEX)	3:54:24	Horacio Nava (MEX)	3:59:26	Claudio Vargas (MEX)	4:03:03
2007	Álvaro García (MEX)	4:04:52	Fredy Hernández (COL)	4:05:16	Fausto Quinde (ECU)	4:10:08
2009	Cristian Berdeja (MEX)	3:58:46	Mesias Zapata (ECU)	4:08:10	Rodrigo Moreno (COL)	4:09:31
2011	Cristian Berdeja (MEX)	3:59:14	Fredy Hernández (COL)	3:59:40	Rolando Saquipay (ECU)	4:01:20
2013	Omar Zepeda (MEX)	3:57:52	Horacio Nava (MEX)	3:58:00	Omar Segura (MEX)	4:03:11
2015	Horacio Nava (MEX)	3:45:41	Cristian Berdeja (MEX)	3:50:19	James Rendón (COL)	3:50:47
2017	Claudio Villanueva (ECU)	3:51:35	Luis Fernando López (COL)	3:51:35	José Leonardo Montaña (COL)	3:58:28

^{†}: In 2000 Germán Sánchez from Mexico started out of competition and came in third in 3:48:06.
^{‡}: In 2003, the medallists were extracted from the IAAF World Race Walking Challenge. The winner was Jesús Ángel García from Spain in 3:46:46. Craig Barrett from New Zealand came in second in 3:51:15. Miguel Solís from Mexico was 5th in 4:18:02, Juan Emilio Toscano from Mexico was 6th in 4:18:52, and Saúl Méndez also from Mexico was 7th in 4:19:12, but all three of them were not registered for participation at the Pan American Race Walking Cup. However, there are conflicting information: another source declares Miguel Solís from Mexico as bronze medal winner.

=== Women's results ===
==== 10 kilometres women ====
Year	Gold		Silver		Bronze	
1984	Ann Peel (CAN)	49:41	Janice McCaffrey (CAN)	50:15	Esther Lopez (USA)	50:55
1986	Graciela Mendoza (MEX)	45:23	Ann Peel (CAN)	45:26	María de la Luz Colín (MEX)	45:33
1988	Ann Peel (CAN)	46:23	María de la Luz Colín (MEX)	46:33	Deborah Lawrence (USA)	46:44
1990^{†}	Graciela Mendoza (MEX)	46:07	Janice McCaffrey (CAN)	46:41	Francisca Martínez (MEX)	47:06
1992	Francisca Martínez (MEX)	47:11	María de la Luz Colín (MEX)	47:27	Victoria Herazo (USA)	47:42
1994	Graciela Mendoza (MEX)	46:14	Teresa Vaill (USA)	46:20	Francisca Martínez (MEX)	46:28
1996	Graciela Mendoza (MEX)	48:24	Michelle Rohl (USA)	49:10	Debbie Van Orden (USA)	49:43

^{†}:In 1990, Marisela Chávez from Mexico started out of competition and came in third in 46:48.

==== 20 kilometres women ====
Year	Gold		Silver		Bronze	
1998	Joanne Dow (USA)	1:38:57	Teresa Vaill (USA)	1:41:02	Rosario Sánchez Guerrero (MEX)	1:42:22
2000^{†}	María Guadalupe Sánchez (MEX)	1:34:39	Graciela Mendoza (MEX)	1:35:29	Oslaidis Cruz (CUB)	1:36:01
2001	María Guadalupe Sánchez (MEX)	1:38:03	Victoria Palacios (MEX)	1:38:27	Geovana Irusta (BOL)	1:40:23
2003	Rosario Sánchez (MEX)	1:37:14	Geovana Irusta (BOL)	1:37:53	Sandra Zapata (COL)	1:38:45
2005	Cristina López (ESA)	1:30:35	Miriam Ramón (ECU)	1:31:25	Graciela Mendoza (MEX)	1:33:04
2007	Cristina López (ESA)	1:39:21	Miriam Ramón (ECU)	1:39:43	Yadira Guamán (ECU)	1:41:08
2009	Tânia Spindler (BRA)	1:38:53	Verónica Colindres (ESA)	1:39:45	Rosario Sánchez Guerrero (MEX)	1:42:12
2011	Jamy Franco (GUA)	1:36:04	Arabelly Orjuela (COL)	1:36:12	Ingrid Hernández (COL)	1:37:18
2013	Kimberly García (PER)	1:35:01	Sandra Arenas (COL)	1:35:14	Yanelli Caballero (MEX)	1:35:19
2015	Lupita González (MEX)	1:29:21	Kimberly García (PER)	1:31:13	Mirna Ortiz (GUA)	1:31:31
2017	Lupita González (MEX)	1:28:09	Kimberly García (PER)	1:29:15	Paola Pérez (ECU)	1:30:00

^{†}: In 2000, Mara Ibáñez from Mexico started out of competition and came in second in 1:34:52.

==== 50 kilometres women ====
Year	Gold		Silver		Bronze	
2017	Nair Da Rosa (BRA)	4:39:28	Yoci Caballero (PER)	4:49:45	Susan Randall (USA)	5:02:10

=== Junior (U-20) men's results ===
==== 10 kilometres men U20 ====
Year	Gold		Silver		Bronze	
2005	Alex Tapía (PER)	42:11	Robinson Vivar (ECU)	42:27	Yassir Cabrera (PAN)	43:19
2007	Mauricio Arteaga (ECU)	43:49	Yassir Cabrera (PAN)	44:19	Dejaime de Oliveira (BRA)	44:27
2009	Caio Bonfim (BRA)	43:04	Adrian Ochoa (MEX)	43:05	Julián Rendón (COL)	43:57
2011	Éider Arévalo (COL)	40:40	José Leonardo Montaña (COL)	41:51	Jesús Tadeo (MEX)	42:29
2013	Manuel Esteban Soto (COL)	41:18.6	Erwin González (MEX)	41:26.5	Iván Garrido (COL)	41:32.4
2015	Brayan Fuentes (COL)	41:41	Paolo Yurivilca (PER)	41:45	César Herrera (COL)	42:36

=== Junior (U-20) women's results ===
==== 10 kilometres women U20 ====
Year	Gold		Silver		Bronze	
2005	Rachel Lavallée (CAN)	47:37	Maria Michta (USA)	48:03	Verónica Colindres (ESA)	48:06
2007	Maritza Guamán (ECU)	51:24	Leslie Guavita (COL)	51:32	Lauren Forgues (USA)	51:39
2009	Anlly Pineda (COL)	49:50	Erandi Uribe (MEX)	50:50	Adriana Ochoa (MEX)	51:29
2011	Yanelli Caballero (MEX)	47:23	Kimberly García (PER)	49:13	Yuli Capcha (PER)	49:34
2013	Alejandra Ortega (MEX)	49:12.8	Jessica Hancco (PER)	51:30.4	Jessica Tapia (MEX)	51:31.0
2015	Stefany Coronado (BOL)	47:05	Valeria Ortuño (MEX)	47:19	María Montoya (COL)	47:38

== List of Records of the Pan American Race Walking Cup ==
=== Men ===
Event	Record	Athlete	Nationality	Date	Meet	Notes
20 km	1:19:21 hrs	Rolando Saquipay	Ecuador	May 7, 2005	2005 Lima Peru	
50 km	3:43:52 hrs	Miguel Ángel Rodríguez	Mexico	April 9, 2000	2000 Poza Rica Mexico	
10 km (Junior Event)	40:40 min	Éider Arévalo	Colombia	March 26, 2011	2011 Envigado Colombia	

=== Women ===
Event	Record	Athlete	Nationality	Date	Meet	Place	Ref.
10 km (Junior Event)	47:05	Stefany Coronado	Bolivia	9 May 2015	2015 Cup	Arica, Chile	
20 km	1:28:09	Lupita González	Mexico	13 May 2017	2017 Cup	Lima, Peru	
50 km walk	4:22:57	Evelyn Inga	Peru	21 April 2019	2019 Cup	Lázaro Cárdenas, Mexico	

=== Records in defunct events ===
==== Women's events ====
Event	Record	Name	Nation	Date	Meet	Ref.
10 km	45:23 min	Graciela Mendoza	Mexico	October 3, 1986	1986 Saint Léonard Canada	

== See also ==
- IAAF World Race Walking Cup
- European Race Walking Cup
- South American Race Walking Championships
- Asian Race Walking Championships
- Oceania Race Walking Championships
- Central American Race Walking Championships
