= 2000 Pan American Race Walking Cup =

- Organisers: Pan American Race Walking Committee
- Edition: 9th
- Date: 8–9 April
- Host city: Poza Rica, Veracruz, (Mexico) México
- Venue: Boulevard Adolfo Ruiz Cortínez
- Events: 3
- Participation: 72 (+ 58 guests) athletes from 12 nations

The 2000 Pan American Race Walking Cup was held in Poza Rica, Veracruz, México. The track of the Cup runs in the Boulevard Adolfo Ruiz Cortínez.

A detailed report was given by Juan Ramon Pina. The Mexican Athletics Federation used the event as trials for the Olympic Games in Sydney. Therefore, a great number of guest athletes competed out of competition.

Complete results, medal winners until 2011, and the results for the Mexican athletes were published.

== Medallists ==
Event	Gold		Silver		Bronze	
Men
20 km walk	Bernardo Segura (MEX)	1:22:48	Noe Hernández (MEX)	1:22:48	Jefferson Pérez (ECU)	1:23:46
50 km walk	Miguel Ángel Rodríguez (MEX)	3:43:52	Joel Sánchez (MEX)	3:47:55	Carlos Mercenario (MEX)	3:50:28
Men (Team)
Team 20 km walk	(Mexico) México	7 pts	United States	22 pts		
Team 50 km walk	(Mexico) México	6 pts	Cuba	19 pts	United States	32 pts
Women
20 km walk	María Guadalupe Sánchez (MEX)	1:34:40	Graciela Mendoza (MEX)	1:35:29	Oslaidis Cruz (CUB)	1:36:01
Women (Team)
Team 20 km walk	(Mexico) México	7 pts	United States	24 pts	Canada	47 pts

== Results ==
=== Men's 20 km ===
Place	Athlete	Time
1st place, gold medalist(s)	Bernardo Segura MEX	1:22:48
2nd place, silver medalist(s)	Noe Hernández MEX	1:22:48
—^{*}	Cristián Berdeja MEX	1:23:46
3rd place, bronze medalist(s)	Jefferson Pérez ECU	1:24:36
4	Alejandro López MEX	1:24:43
—^{*}	Claudio Vargas MEX	1:25:18
5	Andrew Herman USA	1:26:39
6	Luis García GUA	1:27:10
7	Julio Urías GUA	1:27:19
—^{*}	Fernando Guerrero MEX	1:27:33
—^{*}	Daniel Farfán MEX	1:28:30
8	Curt Clausen USA	1:29:59
—^{*}	Juan Toscano MEX	1:31:08
—^{*}	Luis Bautista MEX	1:31:52
9	Kevin Eastler USA	1:31:54
—^{*}	Sean Albert USA	1:31:57
—^{*}	Omar Segura MEX	1:32:18
10	Hugo Aros CHI	1:35:06
—^{*}	Philip Dunn USA	1:35:10
—^{*}	Felipe Nava MEX	1:35:42
—^{*}	Carlos Flores MEX	1:35:52
11	Jonathan Matthews USA	1:36:32
12	Franciélio Medeiros BRA	1:37:09
13	Tim Berrett CAN	1:38:01
14	Eliu Barrera CHI	1:38:02
15	Ricardo Alexandre Reinert BRA	1:40:43
16	Blair Miller CAN	1:41:16
17	Andrés Chocho ECU	1:42:44
—^{*}	Josué Cruz MEX	1:44:08
—^{*}	Félix Cano MEX	1:48:17
—	Juan José Sánchez MEX	DQ
—	Roaldo Estrada GUA	DQ
—	Gordon Mosher CAN	DQ
—	Jean-Sébastien Beaucage CAN	DQ
—	Juan Manuel Pérez MEX	DQ
—	Jorge Segura MEX	DQ
—	Alberto Cruz MEX	DQ
—	Matías Sánchez MEX	DQ
—	David Silva MEX	DQ
—	Mario Iván Flores MEX	DNF
—	Fausto Quinde ECU	DNF
—	Xavier Moreno ECU	DNF
—	Tim Seaman USA	DNF
—	Julio Martínez GUA	DNF
—	Hugo López GUA	DNF
—	Patrick Boisclair CAN	DNF
—	Cristián Muñoz CHI	DNF
—	Gerson Villagra CHI	DNF
—	Claudio Bertolino BRA	DNF
—	Marcos Valdez MEX	DNF
—	Ramón Porcayo MEX	DNF
—	Sergio Sánchez MEX	DNF
—	Eduardo Zepeda MEX	DNF
—	Mario Solís MEX	DNF
—	José Sánchez MEX	DNF
—	Alfonso Guerrero MEX	DNF
—	Oscar Ramírez MEX	DNF
—	Dave McGovern USA	DNF

^{*}: Started as a guest out of competition.

==== Team ====
Place	Country	Points
1st place, gold medalist(s)	(Mexico) México	pts
2nd place, silver medalist(s)	United States	22 pts

=== Men's 50 km ===
Place	Athlete	Time
1st place, gold medalist(s)	Miguel Ángel Rodríguez MEX	3:43:52
2nd place, silver medalist(s)	Joel Sánchez MEX	3:47:55
—^{*}	Germán Sánchez MEX	3:48:06
3rd place, bronze medalist(s)	Carlos Mercenario MEX	3:50:28
—^{*}	Edgar Hernández MEX	3:56:36
4	Arturo Huerta CAN	3:58:02
5	Jorge Luis Pino CUB	4:07:04
—^{*}	Saúl Méndez MEX	4:11:52
6	Ihosvany Díaz CUB	4:13:37
—^{*}	Marco Váldez MEX	4:15:33
—^{*}	Jaime González MEX	4:16:26
—^{*}	Jesús Martínez MEX	4:19:22
7	Luis Villagra CHI	4:26:49
8	Erick Cordero CUB	4:33:02
9	Mark Green USA	4:39:04
10	Cláudio Richardson dos Santos BRA	4:48:36
11	Theron Kissinger USA	4:51:31
12	Gary Morgan USA	5:02:07
13	William Leggett USA	5:04:51
14	José Ramírez PUR	5:15:54
—	Oscar Mesa PAR	DQ
—	Francisco Berdeja MEX	DQ
—	Ernesto Solís MEX	DQ
—	Manuel Fuentes MEX	DQ
—	Miguel Solis MEX	DQ
—	Rogelio Sánchez MEX	DQ
—	Daniel García MEX	DNF
—	Alejandro López MEX	DNF
—	Joaquín Córdoba COL	DNF
—	Ignacio Zamudio MEX	DNF
—	Jesús Sánchez MEX	DNF
—	Mauricio Villagad MEX	DNF
—	Benjamín Peña MEX	DNF
—	Omar Zepeda MEX	DNF
—	Mario Iván Flores MEX	DNF
—	Alejandro López MEX	DNF
—	Rubén Arikado MEX	DNF
—	Ethiel Soto MEX	DNF

^{*}: Started as a guest out of competition.

==== Team ====
Place	Country	Points
1st place, gold medalist(s)	(Mexico) México	6 pts
2nd place, silver medalist(s)	Cuba	19 pts
3rd place, bronze medalist(s)	United States	32 pts

=== Women's 20 km ===
Place	Athlete	Time
1st place, gold medalist(s)	María Guadalupe Sánchez MEX	1:34:40
—^{*}	Mara Ibáñez MEX	1:34:52
2nd place, silver medalist(s)	Graciela Mendoza MEX	1:35:29
3rd place, bronze medalist(s)	Oslaidis Cruz CUB	1:36:01
4	María del Rosario Sánchez MEX	1:36:14
—^{*}	Abigail Sáenz MEX	1:37:04
5	Teresita Collado GUA	1:37:29
6	Michelle Rohl USA	1:37:48
7	Ivonne Varas MEX	1:39:06
8	Susan Armenta USA	1:39:54
9	Geovana Irusta BOL	1:40:49
10	Danielle Kirk USA	1:41:09
—^{*}	Sandra Evaristo MEX	1:42:11
—^{*}	Francisca Martínez MEX	1:42:23
—^{*}	Rosa Roldán MEX	1:42:32
11	Jill Zenner USA	1:43:56
—^{*}	Natalia García MEX	1:44:55
12	Zoila Reyes GUA	1:46:22
13	Marcela Pacheco CHI	1:47:13
—^{*}	Elsa Segura MEX	1:47:20
—^{*}	María Franzón MEX	1:48:57
14	Joni-Ann Bender CAN	1:49:48
15	Gianetti Bonfim BRA	1:52:22
—^{*}	Xitlalli Sáenz MEX	1:53:20
16	Susan Hornung CAN	1:54:24
17	Karen Foan CAN	1:56:53
—	Victoria Palacios MEX	DQ
—	Sara Standley USA	DQ
—	Ana Segura MEX	DQ
—	Vianey Pedraza MEX	DNF
—	Luisa Pantin ECU	DNF
—	Jaditza Arrollo PUR	DNF

^{*}: Started as a guest out of competition.

==== Team ====
Place	Country	Points
1st place, gold medalist(s)	(Mexico) México	7 pts
2nd place, silver medalist(s)	United States	24 pts
3rd place, bronze medalist(s)	Canada	47 pts

== Participation ==
The participation of 72 athletes (plus 58 guest athletes) from 12 countries is reported.

- Bolivia (1)
- Brazil (5)
- Canada (9)
- Chile (6)
- Colombia (1)
- Cuba (4)
- Ecuador (5)
- Guatemala (7)
- (Mexico) México (15)
- Paraguay (1)
- Puerto Rico (2)
- United States (15)

== See also ==
- 2000 Race Walking Year Ranking
