= 1992 Pan American Race Walking Cup =

- Organisers: Pan American Race Walking Committee
- Edition: 5th
- Date: 17–18 October
- Host city: Ciudad de Guatemala, Guatemala
- Venue: Avenida de la Reforma
- Events: 3
- Participation: 64 athletes from 9 nations

The 1992 Pan American Race Walking Cup was held in Ciudad de Guatemala, Guatemala, on 17–18 October. The track of the Cup runs in the Avenida de la Reforma.

Complete results, medal winners until 2011, and the results for the Mexican athletes were published.

== Medallists ==
Event	Gold		Silver		Bronze	
Men
20 km walk	Bernardo Segura (MEX)	1:24:09	Daniel García (MEX)	1:25:34	Alberto Cruz (MEX)	1:28:32
50 km walk	Germán Sánchez (MEX)	4:06:21	Miguel Ángel Rodríguez (MEX)	4:06:21	Carlos Mercenario (MEX)	4:06:21
Men (Team)
Team 20 km walk	(Mexico) México	84 pts	Guatemala	69 pts	United States	59 pts
Team 50 km walk	(Mexico) México	48 pts	Guatemala	36 pts	United States	29 pts
Women
10 km walk	Francisca Martínez (MEX)	47:11	María de la Luz Colín (MEX)	47:27	Victoria Herazo (USA)	47:42
Women (Team)
Team 10 km walk	(Mexico) México	68 pts	United States	60 pts	Canada	42 pts

== Results ==
=== Men's 20 km ===
Place	Athlete	Time
1st place, gold medalist(s)	Bernardo Segura MEX	1:24:09
2nd place, silver medalist(s)	Daniel García MEX	1:25:34
3rd place, bronze medalist(s)	Alberto Cruz MEX	1:28:32
4	Julio René Martínez GUA	1:28:44
5	Jonathan Matthews USA	1:28:58
6	Joel Sánchez MEX	1:30:37
7	Julio César Urías GUA	1:31:36
8	Orlando Díaz COL	1:32:27
9	Alejandro López MEX	1:33:12
10	Hugo Leonel López GUA	1:33:20
11	Arturo Huerta CAN	1:34:37
12	Ray Funkhouser USA	1:35:06
13	Benjamín Loréfice ARG	1:37:51
14	Dave McGovern USA	1:38:36
15	Nicolás Soto PUR	1:41:22
16	Jorge Citalán GUA	1:42:22
17	Roberto Oscal GUA	1:42:49
18	Boris Molina HON	1:43:32
19	Rafael Valladares HON	1:45:36
20	Francisco Guzmán ESA	1:52:30
21	Ernesto Elias ESA	1:54:00
22	Victor Salgado HON	1:55:35
—	Jorge Loréfice ARG	DQ
—	Marco Aguiluz HON	DQ
—	Tim Berrett CAN	DQ
—	Gary Morgan USA	DQ
—	Allen James USA	DNF

==== Team ====
Place	Country	Points
1st place, gold medalist(s)	(Mexico) México	84 pts
2nd place, silver medalist(s)	Guatemala	69 pts
3rd place, bronze medalist(s)	United States	59 pts
4	Honduras	31 pts

=== Men's 50 km ===
Place	Athlete	Time
1st place, gold medalist(s)	Germán Sánchez MEX	4:06:21
2nd place, silver medalist(s)	Miguel Ángel Rodríguez MEX	4:06:21
3rd place, bronze medalist(s)	Carlos Mercenario MEX	4:06:21
4	Julio César Urías GUA	4:09:55
5	Nelson Eduardo Funes GUA	4:14:20
6	Tim Berrett CAN	4:14:46
7	Andrzej Chylinski USA	4:21:09
8	David Marchese USA	4:22:30
9	Ottoniel Archila GUA	4:23:09
10	Carl Schueler USA	4:24:46
11	Herman Nelson USA	4:32:42
12	Sergio Velazco MEX	4:34:45
13	Mario Casas MEX	4:44:07
14	Antonio Lemus GUA	4:47:30
—	Paul Malek USA	DNF

==== Team ====
Place	Country	Points
1st place, gold medalist(s)	(Mexico) México	48 pts
2nd place, silver medalist(s)	Guatemala	36 pts
3rd place, bronze medalist(s)	United States	29 pts

=== Women's 10 km ===
Place	Athlete	Time
1st place, gold medalist(s)	Francisca Martínez MEX	47:11
2nd place, silver medalist(s)	María de la Luz Colín MEX	47:27
3rd place, bronze medalist(s)	Victoria Herazo USA	47:42
4	Maribel Rebollo MEX	49:16
5	Sara Stanley USA	49:18
6	Liliana Bermeo COL	49:28
7	Debbie Van Orden USA	49:37
8	Cindy March USA	50:05
9	Lynda Brubaker USA	50:41
10	Brigitte Leblanc CAN	51:08
11	Corinne Whissel CAN	53:54
12	Joanna Irvine CAN	54:42
13	María Magdalena Guzmán ESA	54:47
14	Lidia Ojeda de Carriego ARG	57:04
15	Olga Martínez GUA	58:03
16	Ivis Haydee Martínez ESA	1:00:54
17	Silvia Valencia ESA	1:01:25
18	Reina Gómez GUA	1:06:05
19	Angelica Bustillo HON	1:11:54
—	María Ambrosio GUA	DQ
—	Rosario Silva MEX	DQ
—	Graciela Mendoza MEX	DQ

==== Team ====
Place	Country	Points
1st place, gold medalist(s)	(Mexico) México	68 pts
2nd place, silver medalist(s)	United States	60 pts
3rd place, bronze medalist(s)	Canada	42 pts
4	El Salvador	29 pts

== Participation ==
The participation of 64 athletes from 9 countries is reported.

- Argentina (3)
- Canada (5)
- Colombia (2)
- El Salvador (5)
- Guatemala (11)
- Honduras (5)
- (Mexico) México (15)
- Puerto Rico (1)
- United States (15)

== See also ==
- 1992 Race Walking Year Ranking
