= 1996 Pan American Race Walking Cup =

- Organisers: Pan American Race Walking Committee
- Edition: 7th
- Date: 21–22 September
- Host city: Manaus, Amazonas, Brazil
- Venue: Estrada da Ponta Negra
- Events: 3
- Participation: 66 athletes from 9 nations

The 1996 Pan American Race Walking Cup was held in Manaus, Amazonas, Brazil. The track of the Cup runs in the Estrada da Ponta Negra.

Complete results, medal winners until 2011, and the results for the Mexican athletes were published.

== Medallists ==
Event	Gold		Silver		Bronze	
Men
20 km walk	Daniel García (MEX)	1:27:29	Julio René Martínez (GUA)	1:28:47	Miguel Ángel Rodríguez (MEX)	1:29:06
50 km walk	Germán Sánchez (MEX)	4:12:43	Rubén Arikado (MEX)	4:14:17	Joel Sánchez (MEX)	4:22:17
Men (Team)
Team 20 km walk	(Mexico) México	45 pts	Colombia	31 pts	United States	27 pts
Team 50 km walk	(Mexico) México	33 pts	United States	15 pts		
Women
10 km walk	Graciela Mendoza (MEX)	48:24	Michelle Rohl (USA)	49:10	Debbie Van Orden (USA)	49:43
Women (Team)
Team 10 km walk	(Mexico) México	47 pts	United States	45 pts	Canada	28 pts

== Results ==
=== Men's 20 km ===
Place	Athlete	Time
1st place, gold medalist(s)	Daniel García MEX	1:27:29
2nd place, silver medalist(s)	Julio René Martínez GUA	1:28:47
3rd place, bronze medalist(s)	Miguel Ángel Rodríguez MEX	1:29:06
4	Héctor Moreno COL	1:29:38
5	Ignacio Zamudio MEX	1:32:29
6	Allen James USA	1:34:46
7	Querubín Moreno COL	1:36:06
8	Arturo Huerta CAN	1:36:59
9	Luis Fernando García GUA	1:37:36
10	Robert Cole USA	1:37:49
11	Gary Morgan USA	1:39:29
12	Wilson Vargas COL	1:39:30
13	Tim Seaman USA	1:41:41
14	Jeff Cassin CAN	1:47:03
15	Wellington da Silva Souza BRA	1:47:18
16	David Reyes GUA	1:55:36
17	José Ramírez PUR	2:00:13
—	Jorge Segura MEX	DQ
—	Roberto Oscal GUA	DQ
—	Curt Clausen USA	DQ
—	Alejandro López MEX	DQ
—	Sérgio Vieira Galdino BRA	DNF
—	Ramón Muñiz Jiménez PUR	DNF
—	Pascal Pedneault CAN	DNF
—	Ademar José Kammler BRA	DNF
—	Cláudio Bertolino BRA	DNF
—	Sidinei José Rodrigues BRA	DNF

==== Team ====
Place	Country	Points
1st place, gold medalist(s)	(Mexico) México	45 pts
2nd place, silver medalist(s)	Colombia	31 pts
3rd place, bronze medalist(s)	United States	27 pts
4	Guatemala	27 pts

=== Men's 50 km ===
Place	Athlete	Time
1st place, gold medalist(s)	Germán Sánchez MEX	4:12:43
2nd place, silver medalist(s)	Rubén Arikado MEX	4:14:17
3rd place, bronze medalist(s)	Joel Sánchez MEX	4:22:17
4	Hugo Leonel López GUA	4:27:34
5	Andrzej Chylinski USA	4:33:31
6	Sergio Velasco MEX	4:36:41
7	Rodrigo Moreno COL	4:38:38
8	Marco Evoniuk USA	4:40:18
9	Antônio Kohler BRA	4:45:03
10	Nelson Eduardo Funes GUA	4:57:16
11	Ian Whatley USA	4:58:50
12	David Marchese USA	5:12:23
—	Gerson Ademir Fagundes BRA	DQ
—	Eloy Quispe BOL	DQ
—	Alfonso Guerrero MEX	DQ
—	Ramón Muñiz Jiménez PUR	DNF
—	Fernando Rozo COL	DNF
—	Julio César Urías GUA	DNF
—	Herman Nelson USA	DNF

==== Team ====
Place	Country	Points
1st place, gold medalist(s)	(Mexico) México	33 pts
2nd place, silver medalist(s)	United States	15 pts

=== Women's 10 km ===
Place	Athlete	Time
1st place, gold medalist(s)	Graciela Mendoza MEX	48:24
2nd place, silver medalist(s)	Michelle Rohl USA	49:10
3rd place, bronze medalist(s)	Debbie Van Orden USA	49:43
4	María del Rosario Sánchez MEX	49:59
5	Francisca Martínez MEX	50:28
6	Tina Poitras CAN	51:04
7	Sara Standley USA	51:27
8	Joni-Ann Bender CAN	51:35
9	Ivonne Varas MEX	53:01
10	Gianetti Bonfim BRA	53:09
11	Dana Yarbrough USA	53:18
12	Nailze de Azevedo Pazin BRA	53:39
13	Abigail Sáenz MEX	53:56
14	Nohora Paque COL	54:05
15	Susan Hornung CAN	54:07
16	Rosane Prigol dos Santos BRA	56:36
17	Sandra Zapata COL	57:59
18	Rosemar Piazza BRA	58:21
—	Ofelia Puyol ARG	DQ
—	Victoria Herazo USA	DQ
—	Liliana Bermeo COL	DNF

==== Team ====
Place	Country	Points
1st place, gold medalist(s)	(Mexico) México	47 pts
2nd place, silver medalist(s)	United States	45 pts
3rd place, bronze medalist(s)	Canada	28 pts
4	Brazil	19 pts

== Participation ==
The participation of 66 athletes from 9 countries is reported.

- Argentina (1)
- Bolivia (1)
- Brazil (11)
- Canada (6)
- Colombia (8)
- Guatemala (7)
- (Mexico) México (15)
- Puerto Rico (2)
- United States (15)

== See also ==
- 1996 Race Walking Year Ranking
