= 1994 Pan American Race Walking Cup =

- Organisers: Pan American Race Walking Committee
- Edition: 6th
- Date: 23–24 September
- Host city: Atlanta, Georgia, United States
- Venue: Georgia Avenue
- Events: 3
- Participation: 83 athletes from 11 nations

The 1994 Pan American Race Walking Cup was held in Atlanta, Georgia, United States, on 23–24 September. The track of the Cup runs in the Georgia Avenue.

Complete results, medal winners until 2011, and the results for the Mexican athletes were published.

== Medallists ==
Event	Gold		Silver		Bronze	
Men
20 km walk	Bernardo Segura (MEX)	1:24:15	Daniel García (MEX)	1:24:23	Jefferson Pérez (ECU)	1:24:34
50 km walk	Carlos Mercenario (MEX)	3:52:06	Miguel Ángel Rodríguez (MEX)	3:52:06	Germán Sánchez (MEX)	4:03:07
Men (Team)
Team 20 km walk	(Mexico) México	444 pts	Colombia	423 pts	Brazil	421 pts
Team 50 km walk	(Mexico) México	445 pts	Cuba	429 pts	United States	427 pts
Women
10 km walk	Graciela Mendoza (MEX)	46:14	Teresa Vaill (USA)	46:20	Francisca Martinez (MEX)	46:28
Women (Team)
Team 10 km walk	(Mexico) México	442 pts	United States	431 pts	Canada	429 pts

== Results ==
=== Men's 20 km ===
Place	Athlete	Time
1st place, gold medalist(s)	Bernardo Segura MEX	1:24:15
2nd place, silver medalist(s)	Daniel García MEX	1:24:23
3rd place, bronze medalist(s)	Jefferson Pérez ECU	1:24:34
4	Miguel Solís MEX	1:26:03
5	Martin St. Pierre CAN	1:26:26
6	Héctor Moreno COL	1:26:30
7	Sérgio Vieira Galdino BRA	1:26:47
8	Julio René Martínez GUA	1:26:51
9	Cláudio Bertolino BRA	1:27:24
10	Querubín Moreno COL	1:27:43
11	Clodomiro Moreno COL	1:28:03
12	Jonathan Matthews USA	1:28:04
13	Ademar Kammler BRA	1:28:38
14	Allen James USA	1:30:01
15	Jorge Segura MEX	1:31:13
16	Roberto Oscal GUA	1:31:14
17	Jorge Loréfice ARG	1:32:07
18	Andrzej Chylinski USA	1:32:15
19	Omar Aguirre ECU	1:32:54
20	Philip Dunn USA	1:35:53
21	Pascal Pedneault CAN	1:36:14
22	Andrew Hermann USA	1:38:25
23	Luis Fernando García GUA	1:39:07
24	José Torres PUR	1:41:13
25	Tim Seaman USA	1:41:13
26	Arturo Huerta CAN	1:44:14
27	Elias Balmore ESA	1:46:10
28	Carlos Rivera ESA	1:46:17
—	Benjamín Loréfice ARG	DQ
—	Milton Uyaguari ECU	DQ
—	Rodrigo Serrano MEX	DQ

==== Team ====
Place	Country	Points
1st place, gold medalist(s)	(Mexico) México	444 pts
2nd place, silver medalist(s)	Colombia	423 pts
3rd place, bronze medalist(s)	Brazil	421 pts
4	Guatemala	407 pts
5	United States	407 pts
6	Canada	304 pts
7	Ecuador	279 pts
8	El Salvador	253 pts
9	Argentina	134 pts
10	Puerto Rico	129 pts

=== Men's 50 km ===
Place	Athlete	Time
1st place, gold medalist(s)	Carlos Mercenario MEX	3:52:06
2nd place, silver medalist(s)	Miguel Ángel Rodríguez MEX	3:52:06
3rd place, bronze medalist(s)	Germán Sánchez MEX	4:03:07
4	Rubén Arikado MEX	4:09:46
5	Ignacio Zamudio MEX	4:16:55
6	Jorge Luis Pino CUB	4:17:31
7	Julio César Urías GUA	4:18:41
8	Robert Cole USA	4:23:10
9	Daniel Vargas Hernández CUB	4:24:38
10	Steve Pecinovsky USA	4:33:50
11	David Marchese USA	4:34:11
12	Jorge Risquet CUB	4:35:47
13	Paul Wick USA	4:41:31
14	Ademir Domingues BRA	4:46:48
—	Nelson dos Santos BRA	DQ
—	Francisco Gómez CUB	DQ
—	Edel Oliva CUB	DQ
—	Manoel Pereira de Souza BRA	DNF
—	Tim Berrett CAN	DNF
—	Hugo Leonel López GUA	DNF
—	Julio René Martínez GUA	DNF
—	Paul Malek USA	DNF

==== Team ====
Place	Country	Points
1st place, gold medalist(s)	(Mexico) México	445 pts
2nd place, silver medalist(s)	Cuba	429 pts
3rd place, bronze medalist(s)	United States	427 pts
4	Guatemala	345 pts
5	Brazil	139 pts

=== Women's 10 km ===
Place	Athlete	Time
1st place, gold medalist(s)	Graciela Mendoza MEX	46:14
2nd place, silver medalist(s)	Teresa Vaill USA	46:20
3rd place, bronze medalist(s)	Francisca Martinez MEX	46:28
4	Janice McCaffrey CAN	46:43
5	María de la Luz Colín MEX	47:09
6	Miriam Ramón ECU	47:12
7	Holly Gerke CAN	47:28
8	Victoria Herazo USA	47:48
9	María del Rosario Sánchez MEX	48:13
10	Debbie Van Orden USA	48:15
11	Pascale Grand CAN	48:35
12	Lynda Brubaker USA	48:42
13	Rachel Robichaud CAN	49:23
14	Dana Yarbrough USA	49:39
15	Gretchen Eastler USA	51:40
16	María Magdalena Guzmán ESA	52:19
17	Nailze de Azevedo Pazin BRA	52:30
18	Lisa Sonntag USA	52:47
19	D. A. Walker USA	53:35
20	Lidia Ojeda de Carriego ARG	53:42
21	Rosemar Piazza BRA	54:33
22	Micheline Daneau CAN	55:15
23	Ivana Rubia Henn BRA	55:19
24	Susan Hornung CAN	58:00
25	Ofelia Puyol ARG	58:28
26	Mildred Zayas Martínez PUR	1:01:50
—	Eva Machuca MEX	DQ
—	Cheryl Rellinger USA	DQ
—	Bertha Vera ECU	DNF

==== Team ====
Place	Country	Points
1st place, gold medalist(s)	(Mexico) México	442 pts
2nd place, silver medalist(s)	United States	431 pts
3rd place, bronze medalist(s)	Canada	429 pts
4	Brazil	409 pts
5	Argentina	271 pts
6	Ecuador	144 pts
7	El Salvador	139 pts
8	Puerto Rico	133 pts

== Participation ==
The participation of 83 athletes from 11 countries is reported.

- Argentina (4)
- Brazil (9)
- Canada (10)
- Colombia (3)
- Cuba (5)
- Ecuador (5)
- El Salvador (3)
- Guatemala (6)
- (Mexico) México (15)
- Puerto Rico (2)
- United States (20)

== See also ==
- 1994 Race Walking Year Ranking
