= 2001 Pan American Race Walking Cup =

- Organisers: Pan American Race Walking Committee
- Edition: 10th
- Date: 27–28 October
- Host city: Cuenca, Azuay, Ecuador
- Venue: Avenida España, Parque Calderón
- Events: 3
- Participation: 59 athletes from 9 nations

The 2001 Pan American Race Walking Cup was held in Cuenca, Azuay, Ecuador on 27–28 October. The track of the Cup runs in the Avenida España, Parque Calderón.

The event was held jointly with the South American Race Walking Championships, featuring the men's 35 kilometres race rather than the 50 kilometres.

Complete results, medal winners until 2011, and the results for the Mexican athletes were published.

== Medallists ==
| Event | Gold | | Silver | | Bronze | |
|---|---|---|---|---|---|---|
Men
| 20 km walk | Alejandro López (MEX) | 1:25:25 | Jefferson Pérez (ECU) | 1:26:21 | Jesús Sánchez (MEX) | 1:28:30 |
| 50 km walk | Édgar Hernández (MEX) | 4:05:25 | Fernando Guerrero (MEX) | 4:07:14 | Germán Sánchez (MEX) | 4:09:24 |
Men (Team)
| Team 20 km walk | (Mexico) México | 8 pts | Ecuador | 21 pts | United States | 26 pts |
| Team 50 km walk | (Mexico) México | 6 pts | | | | |
Women
| 20 km walk | María Guadalupe Sánchez (MEX) | 1:38:03 | Victoria Palacios (MEX) | 1:38:27 | Geovana Irusta (BOL) | 1:40:23 |
Women (Team)
| Team 20 km walk | (Mexico) México | 7 pts | United States | 34 pts | | |

== Results ==
=== Men's 20 km ===
| Place | Athlete | Time |
|---|---|---|
| 1st place, gold medalist(s) | Alejandro López MEX | 1:25:25 |
| 2nd place, silver medalist(s) | Jefferson Pérez ECU | 1:26:21 |
| 3rd place, bronze medalist(s) | Jesús Sánchez MEX | 1:28:30 |
| 4 | Claudio Vargas MEX | 1:29:37 |
| 5 | Cristián Muñoz CHI | 1:30:00 |
| 6 | Fausto Quinde ECU | 1:30:06 |
| 7 | Sean Albert USA | 1:33:22 |
| 8 | John Nunn USA | 1:36:36 |
| 9 | Marco Taype PER | 1:37:13 |
| 10 | Hugo Aros CHI | 1:37:33 |
| 11 | Philip Dunn USA | 1:38:20 |
| 12 | José Ramírez PUR | 1:51:43 |
| 13 | Juan Albarracín ECU | 1:55:38 |
| 14 | Angel Pucha ECU | 2:02:52 |
| — | José Alessandro Bagio BRA | DQ |
| — | Mário José dos Santos BRA | DQ |
| — | Francielo de Souza Medeiros BRA | DQ |
| — | Luis Fernando López COL | DQ |
| — | Daniel García MEX | DQ |
| — | Erick Guevara MEX | DQ |
| — | Al Heppner USA | DQ |

==== Team ====
| Place | Country | Points |
|---|---|---|
| 1st place, gold medalist(s) | (Mexico) México | 8 pts |
| 2nd place, silver medalist(s) | Ecuador | 21 pts |
| 3rd place, bronze medalist(s) | United States | 26 pts |

=== Men's 50 km ===
| Place | Athlete | Time |
|---|---|---|
| 1st place, gold medalist(s) | Édgar Hernández MEX | 4:05:25 |
| 2nd place, silver medalist(s) | Fernando Guerrero MEX | 4:07:14 |
| 3rd place, bronze medalist(s) | Germán Sánchez MEX | 4:09:24 |
| 4 | Juan Toscano MEX | 4:25:54 |
| 5 | Dave McGovern USA | 4:54:08 |
| 6 | John Soucheck USA | 4:55:07 |
| — | Julián Choque BOL | DQ |
| — | Claudio Richardson Santos BRA | DQ |
| — | Luis Villagra CHI | DQ |
| — | Patricio Villacorte ECU | DQ |
| — | Xavier Moreno ECU | DQ |
| — | Rolando Saquipay ECU | DQ |
| — | Juan Albarracín ECU | DQ |
| — | Angel Pucha ECU | DQ |
| — | Omar Zepeda MEX | DQ |
| — | Curt Clausen USA | DQ |
| — | Theron Kissinger USA | DQ |
| — | Cristián Muñoz CHI | DNF |
| — | Eliu Barrera CHI | DNF |
| — | Daniel Alexandre Voigt BRA | DNF |
| — | Mário José dos Santos BRA | DNF |

==== Team ====
| Place | Country | Points |
|---|---|---|
| 1st place, gold medalist(s) | (Mexico) México | 6 pts |

=== Women's 20 km ===
| Place | Athlete | Time |
|---|---|---|
| 1st place, gold medalist(s) | María Guadalupe Sánchez MEX | 1:38:03 |
| 2nd place, silver medalist(s) | Victoria Palacios MEX | 1:38:27 |
| 3rd place, bronze medalist(s) | Geovana Irusta BOL | 1:40:23 |
| 4 | Francisca Martínez MEX | 1:40:53 |
| 5 | María del Rosario Sánchez MEX | 1:42:33 |
| 6 | Mara Ibáñez MEX | 1:45:53 |
| 7 | Cristina Bohórquez COL | 1:46:55 |
| 8 | Gianetti Bonfim BRA | 1:46:55 |
| 9 | Jill Zenner USA | 1:48:24 |
| 10 | Tânia Regina Spindler BRA | 1:52:50 |
| 11 | Gima Castelo ECU | 1:53:41 |
| 12 | Deborah Huberty USA | 2:02:47 |
| 13 | Samantha Cohen USA | 2:05:33 |
| 14 | Mónica Sánchez ECU | 2:05:33 |
| — | Miriam Gutiérrez ECU | DQ |
| — | Heidi Hauck USA | DQ |
| — | Rosemar Piazza BRA | DNF |

==== Team ====
| Place | Country | Points |
|---|---|---|
| 1st place, gold medalist(s) | (Mexico) México | 7 pts |
| 2nd place, silver medalist(s) | United States | 34 pts |

== Participation ==
The participation of 59 athletes from 9 countries is reported.

- Bolivia (2)
- Brazil (8)
- Chile (4)
- Colombia (2)
- Ecuador (12)
- (Mexico) México (15)
- (Peru) Perú (1)
- Puerto Rico (1)
- United States (12)

== See also ==
- 2001 Race Walking Year Ranking
