= 2003 Pan American Race Walking Cup =

- Organisers: Pan American Race Walking Committee
- Edition: 11th
- Date: 9 and 15 March
- Host city: Chula Vista, California, United States; Tijuana, Baja California, (Mexico) México
- Venue: Marina Parkway, Chula Vista Marina / Paseo de los Héroes, zona del Río Tijuana
- Events: 3
- Participation: 65 (+ 13 guests) athletes from 10 nations

The 2003 Pan American Race Walking Cup was held in two locations: both 20 kilometres events in Chula Vista, California, United States, on 15 March. The track of the Cup ran in the Marina Parkway at Chula Vista Marina. The men's 50 kilometres event was held one week earlier 15 km away in Tijuana, Baja California, México, on 9 March. Here, the track of the Cup ran in the Paseo de los Héroes, zona del Río Tijuana, and the results were extracted from the inaugural competition of the IAAF World Race Walking Challenge, which was organized as part of the traditional XXVI International Race Walking Week (Spanish: Semana Internacional de la Caminata) held annually since in 1978.

A detailed report for the 50 kilometres event was given by Javier Clavelo Robinson. Because of a compromise with the transmitting TV companies, the start was scheduled at 10:00 rather than the usual 7:00, causing a great number of drop outs due to the hard climatic conditions during midday. The decision to move the start time for Mexican television arguably contributed to the first team loss at the 50 km distance in Pan Am Cup history for the host nation as only two of the five declared Mexican scoring team members finished the race, resulting in a team victory for the United States. The U.S. was the only nation to have three scoring finishers. Despite failing to finish the required three scoring finishers, the Games Committee awarded Mexico the silver and Ecuador bronze in the team competition based on having two and one finisher respectively in the extreme weather conditions.

Complete results were published.

== Medallists ==
Event	Gold		Silver		Bronze	
Men
20 km walk	Jefferson Pérez (ECU)	1:23:12	Cristián Berdeja (MEX)	1:24:17	Cristián Muñoz (CHI)	1:24:34
50 km walk	Germán Sánchez (MEX)	4:04:11	Philip Dunn (USA)	4:15:01	Miguel Solís (MEX)	4:18:02
Men (Team)
Team 20 km walk	United States	13 pts	Ecuador	13 pts	(Mexico) México	23 pts
Team 50 km walk	United States	13 pts	(Mexico) México	-- pts	Ecuador	-- pts
Women
20 km walk	María del Rosario Sánchez (MEX)	1:37:14	Geovana Irusta (BOL)	1:37:53	Sandra Zapata (COL)	1:38:45
Women (Team)
Team 20 km walk	(Mexico) México	6 pts	United States	15 pts		

== Results ==
=== Men's 20 km ===
Place	Athlete	Time
1st place, gold medalist(s)	Jefferson Pérez ECU	1:23:12
2nd place, silver medalist(s)	Cristián Berdeja MEX	1:24:17
3rd place, bronze medalist(s)	Cristián Muñoz CHI	1:24:34
4	Tim Seaman USA	1:25:24
5	Kevin Eastler USA	1:25:34
6	Mário José dos Santos BRA	1:25:49
7	Fausto Quinde ECU	1:25:58
8	Rolando Saquipay ECU	1:26:37
9	Luis Fernando López COL	1:27:15
10	Tim Berrett CAN	1:27:39
11	Sean Albert USA	1:27:42
12	Xavier Moreno ECU	1:28:05
13	Oscar Ramírez MEX	1:29:26
14	Andrés Chocho ECU	1:29:27
15	Curt Clausen USA	1:30:45
16	Ezequiel Nazario PUR	1:31:14
17	John Nunn USA	1:32:13
18	Edwin Malacatus ECU	1:32:49
19	Dave McGovern USA	1:39:32
20	Mark Green USA	1:45:42
21	Nelson Funes GUA	1:49:04
22	David Doherty USA	1:53:55
23	Ricardo Ortiz MEX	2:24:44
—	Guillermo Castellanos MEX	DQ
—	Fredy Hernández COL	DQ
—	Dan O'Brien USA	DNF
—	Bernardo Segura MEX	DNS
—	Erick Guevara MEX	DNS
—	Jesús Sánchez MEX	DNS
—	Claudio Erasmo Vargas MEX	DNS
—	Arturo Huerta CAN	DNS
—	Ricardo Reyes ESA	DNS
—	Salvador Ernesto Mira ESA	DNS
—	Walter Sandoval ESA	DNS
—	Jairol Chacón CRC	DNS
—	Edwin Centeno PER	DNS

==== Team ====
Place	Country	Points
1st place, gold medalist(s)	United States	13 pts
2nd place, silver medalist(s)	Ecuador	13 pts
3rd place, bronze medalist(s)	(Mexico) México	23 pts

=== Men's 50 km ===
Place	Athlete	Time
—^{*}	Jesús Ángel García ESP	3:46:46
—^{*}	Craig Barrett NZL	3:51:15
1st place, gold medalist(s)	Germán Sánchez MEX	4:04:11
2nd place, silver medalist(s)	Philip Dunn USA	4:15:01
(bronze) ^{†}	Miguel Solís MEX	4:18:02
4 ^{†}	Juan Toscano MEX	4:18:52
—^{*}	Saúl Méndez MEX	4:19:12
5^{†}	Cristián Bascuñán CHI	4:19:27
6^{†}	Rogelio Sánchez MEX	4:26:09
—^{*}	Felipe Nava MEX	4:29:58
—^{*}	Humberto Celestino MEX	4:35:04
7	Rolando Saquipay ECU	4:44:16
8	Jesús Martínez MEX	4:49:39
9	Theron Kissinger USA	4:58:10
10	Bill Vayo USA	5:16:44
11	Rod Craig USA	5:18:33
—	Michael Bartholomew USA	DQ
—	John Soucheck USA	DQ
—	Francisco Berdeja MEX	DQ
—	Carlos Flores MEX	DQ
—	David Silva MEX	DQ
—	Alejandro Chávez MEX	DQ
—	Javier Malacatus ECU	DNF
—	Miguel Ángel Rodríguez MEX	DNF
—	Edgar Hernández MEX	DNF
—	Fernando Guerrero MEX	DNF
—	Omar Zepeda MEX	DNF
—	Jaime González MEX	DNF
—	Curt Clausen USA	DNF
—	Horacio Nava MEX	DNF
—	Raúl Cruz MEX	DNF
—	Roberto Demeza MEX	DNF
—^{*}	Andreas Gustafsson SWE	DNF

^{*}: Started as a guest out of competition.
^{†}: Both Miguel Solís and Juan Toscano from México were not listed as members of the official Mexican A Team. Therefore, it remains unclear, whether they were entitled to win medals in the Pan American Race Walk Cup. One source lists Rogelio Sánchez from the Mexican A Team as 4th. In this case, Cristián Bascuñán from Chile would have been the bronze medal winner. On the other hand, two other sources list Miguel Solís as bronze medallist.

==== Team ====
Place	Country	Points
1st place, gold medalist(s)	(Mexico) México	8 pts
2nd place, silver medalist(s)	United States	13 pts

=== Women's 20 km ===
Place	Athlete	Time
1st place, gold medalist(s)	María del Rosario Sánchez MEX	1:37:14
2nd place, silver medalist(s)	Geovana Irusta BOL	1:37:53
3rd place, bronze medalist(s)	Sandra Zapata COL	1:38:45
4	Graciela Mendoza MEX	1:39:21
5	Abigail Sainz MEX	1:43:05
6	Luisa Paltín ECU	1:44:54
7	Samantha Cohen USA	1:44:57
8	Bobbi Jo Chapman USA	1:45:47
9	Jolene Moore USA	1:46:52
10	Cheryl Rellinger USA	1:47:27
11	Susan Armenta USA	1:49:03
12	Gianetti de Sena Bonfim BRA	1:49:38
13	Lisa Sontag USA	1:52:27
14	Heidi Hauck USA	1:53:11
15	Lee Chase USA	1:59:52
16	Erin Taylor USA	2:02:45
—	Francisca Martínez MEX	DQ
—	Marianne Martino USA	DQ
—	Sara Sheets USA	DQ
—	Mara Ibáñez MEX	DNS
—	Aura Morales MEX	DNS
—	Ariana Quino BOL	DNS
—	Zoila Reyes GUA	DNS
—	Evelyn Núñez GUA	DNS

==== Team ====
Place	Country	Points
1st place, gold medalist(s)	(Mexico) México	6 pts
2nd place, silver medalist(s)	United States	15 pts

== Participation ==
The participation of 65 athletes from 10 countries (plus 10 guest athletes for the 50 kilometres event) is reported. In addition, three athletes from overseas were competing for the IAAF World Race Walking Challenge. The assignment for the official participants of the teams from México and the United States remains unclear.

- Bolivia (1)
- Brazil (2)
- Canada (1)
- Chile (2)
- Colombia (3)
- Ecuador (7)
- Guatemala (1)
- (Mexico) México (18) ?
- Puerto Rico (1)
- United States (25) ?

Guest countries:

- New Zealand (1)
- Spain (1)
- Sweden (1)

== See also ==
- 2003 Race Walking Year Ranking
