= 1998 Pan American Race Walking Cup =

- Organisers: Pan American Race Walking Committee
- Edition: 8th
- Date: 3–4 October
- Host city: Miami, Florida, United States
- Venue: Biscayne Boulevard, Bayfront Park
- Events: 3
- Participation: 61 athletes from 9 nations

The 1998 Pan American Race Walking Cup was held in Miami, Florida, United States. The track of the Cup runs in the Biscayne Boulevard, Bayfront Park.

The women's 20 km race was held for the first time replacing the women's 10 km competition.

Complete results, medal winners until 2011, and the results for the Mexican athletes were published.

== Medallists ==
Event	Gold		Silver		Bronze	
Men
20 km walk	Ignacio Zamudio (MEX)	1:28:33	Daniel García (MEX)	1:29:58	Joel Sánchez (MEX)	1:30:23
50 km walk	Carlos Mercenario (MEX)	4:06:38	Rubén Arikado (MEX)	4:12:01	Rogelio Sánchez (MEX)	4:17:18
Men (Team)
Team 20 km walk	(Mexico) México	6 pts	United States	34 pts	Canada	35 pts
Team 50 km walk	(Mexico) México	6 pts	United States	15 pts		
Women
20 km walk	Joanne Dow (USA)	1:38:57	Teresa Vaill (USA)	1:41:02	María del Rosario Sánchez (MEX)	1:42:22
Women (Team)
Team 20 km walk	United States	9 pts	(Mexico) México	14 pts	Canada	38 pts

== Results ==
=== Men's 20 km ===
Place	Athlete	Time
1st place, gold medalist(s)	Ignacio Zamudio MEX	1:28:33
2nd place, silver medalist(s)	Daniel García MEX	1:29:58
3rd place, bronze medalist(s)	Joel Sánchez MEX	1:30:23
4	Arturo Huerta CAN	1:30:35
5	Miguel Solis MEX	1:31:43
6	Alejandro López MEX	1:33:31
7	Luis Fernando García GUA	1:34:00
8	Nixon Zambrano COL	1:35:23
9	Héctor Moreno COL	1:35:57
10	Curt Clausen USA	1:37:11
11	Al Heppner USA	1:37:29
12	Omar Aguirre ECU	1:38:56
13	Jonathan Matthews USA	1:40:09
14	Mário dos Santos BRA	1:41:40
15	Tim Berrett CAN	1:42:19
16	Blair Miller CAN	1:47:03
17	Román Criollo ECU	1:47:03
18	Sérgio Vieira Galdino BRA	1:49:40
19	Sidinei Rodrigues BRA	1:50:00
20	Gary Morgan USA	1:51:18
21	Alfredo Cabrera PUR	1:56:18
—	Gordon Mosher CAN	DQ
—	Mario Alegría GUA	DQ
—	Roberto Oscal GUA	DQ
—	Orlando Díaz COL	DNF
—	Xavier Moreno ECU	DNF
—	Segundo Peñafiel ECU	DNF

==== Team ====
Place	Country	Points
1st place, gold medalist(s)	(Mexico) México	6 pts
2nd place, silver medalist(s)	United States	34 pts
3rd place, bronze medalist(s)	Canada	35 pts
4	Brazil	51 pts

=== Men's 50 km ===
Place	Athlete	Time
1st place, gold medalist(s)	Carlos Mercenario MEX	4:06:38
2nd place, silver medalist(s)	Rubén Arikado MEX	4:12:01
3rd place, bronze medalist(s)	Rogelio Sánchez MEX	4:17:18
4	Philip Dunn USA	4:25:30
5	Marco Evoniuk USA	4:36:53
6	Theron Kissinger USA	4:37:55
7	Mark Green USA	4:44:55
—	Alejandro Vele ECU	DQ
—	Francisco Berdeja MEX	DQ
—	Claudio Erasmo Vargas MEX	DQ
—	Jefferson Pérez ECU	DNF
—	Patricio Villacorte ECU	DNF
—	Hugo López GUA	DNF
—	Julio César Urías GUA	DNF

==== Team ====
Place	Country	Points
1st place, gold medalist(s)	(Mexico) México	6 pts
2nd place, silver medalist(s)	United States	15 pts

=== Women's 20 km ===
Place	Athlete	Time
1st place, gold medalist(s)	Joanne Dow USA	1:38:57
2nd place, silver medalist(s)	Teresa Vaill USA	1:41:02
3rd place, bronze medalist(s)	María del Rosario Sánchez MEX	1:42:22
4	Aura Morales MEX	1:43:03
5	Liliana Bermeo COL	1:43:04
6	Susan Armenta USA	1:44:58
7	Mara Ibáñez MEX	1:46:16
8	Teresita Collado GUA	1:46:37
9	Jill Zenner USA	1:47:15
10	Holly Gerke CAN	1:47:43
11	Victoria Herazo USA	1:48:02
12	Gladys Criollo ECU	1:50:02
13	Janice McCaffrey CAN	1:51:23
14	Gianetti Bonfim BRA	1:51:45
15	Susan Hornung CAN	1:52:15
16	Rosane Prigol dos Santos BRA	1:53:19
17	Zoila Reyes GUA	1:58:00
18	Lidia Ojeda de Carriego ARG	2:01:28
—	Nailze de Azevedo Pazin BRA	DNF
—	Victoria Palacios MEX	DNF

==== Team ====
Place	Country	Points
1st place, gold medalist(s)	United States	9 pts
2nd place, silver medalist(s)	(Mexico) México	14 pts
3rd place, bronze medalist(s)	Canada	38 pts

== Participation ==
The participation of 61 athletes from 9 countries is reported.

- Argentina (1)
- Brazil (6)
- Canada (7)
- Colombia (4)
- Ecuador (8)
- Guatemala (7)
- (Mexico) México (14)
- Puerto Rico (1)
- United States (13)

== See also ==
- 1998 Race Walking Year Ranking
