= Athletics at the 1987 Pan American Games – Women's 10,000 metres walk =

Women's 10 kilometres walk at the Pan American Games

The women's 10,000 metres walk event at the 1987 Pan American Games was held in Indianapolis, United States on 12 August. It was the first time that a women's race walking event was contested at the Games.

== Results ==
Rank	Name	Nationality	Time	Notes
1st place, gold medalist(s)	María Colín	Mexico	47:17.15	GR
2nd place, silver medalist(s)	Ann Peel	Canada	47:17.97	
3rd place, bronze medalist(s)	Maryanne Torrellas	United States	47:35.12	
4	Lynn Weik	United States	48:11.74	
	Graciela Mendoza	Mexico	DQ	
	Janice McCaffrey	Canada	DQ	
