= 1990 Pan American Race Walking Cup =

- Organisers: Pan American Race Walking Committee
- Edition: 4th
- Date: 27–28 October
- Host city: Xalapa, Veracruz, (Mexico) México
- Venue: Paseo de los Lagos
- Events: 3
- Participation: 69 (+ 16 guests) athletes from 9 nations

The 1990 Pan American Race Walking Cup was held in Xalapa, Veracruz, México, on 27–28 October. The track of the Cup runs in the Paseo de los Lagos.

Complete results, medal winners until 2011, and the results for the Mexican athletes were published.

== Medallists ==
| Event | Gold | | Silver | | Bronze | |
|---|---|---|---|---|---|---|
Men
| 20 km walk | Ernesto Canto (MEX) | 1:21:46 | Joel Sánchez (MEX) | 1:22:09 | Carlos Mercenario (MEX) | 1:22:25 |
| 50 km walk | Martín Bermúdez (MEX) | 3:51:30 | Francisco Reyes (MEX) | 3:59:34 | José Víctor Alonzo (GUA) | 4:03:38 |
Men (Team)
| Team 20 km walk | (Mexico) México | 78 pts | Brazil | 60 pts | United States | 50 pts |
| Team 50 km walk | (Mexico) México | 35 pts | Guatemala | 22 pts | United States | 20 pts |
Women
| 10 km walk | Graciela Mendoza (MEX) | 46:07 | Janice McCaffrey (CAN) | 46:41 | Francisca Martínez (MEX) | 47:06 |
Women (Team)
| Team 10 km walk | (Mexico) México | 64 pts | Canada | 59 pts | United States | 48 pts |

== Results ==
=== Men's 20 km ===
| Place | Athlete | Time |
|---|---|---|
| 1st place, gold medalist(s) | Ernesto Canto MEX | 1:21:46 |
| 2nd place, silver medalist(s) | Joel Sánchez MEX | 1:22:09 |
| 3rd place, bronze medalist(s) | Carlos Mercenario MEX | 1:22:25 |
| 4 | Alberto Cruz MEX | 1:22:52 |
| 5 | Guillaume LeBlanc CAN | 1:23:26 |
| —^{*} | Bernando Segura MEX | 1:23:37 |
| 6 | Sérgio Vieira Galdino BRA | 1:25:55 |
| —^{*} | Juan José Sánchez MEX | 1:26:24 |
| —^{*} | Ignacio Zamudio MEX | 1:26:54 |
| —^{*} | Mauricio Villegas MEX | 1:27:07 |
| 7 | Carl Schueler USA | 1:28:21 |
| 8 | Cláudio Luis Bertolino BRA | 1:29:16 |
| —^{*} | Víctor Sánchez MEX | 1:29:27 |
| 9 | José Sánchez MEX | 1:29:30 |
| —^{*} | Mario Casas MEX | 1:31:26 |
| 10 | Marcelo Moreira Palma BRA | 1:32:04 |
| 11 | Douglas Fournier USA | 1:32:16 |
| 12 | Julio César Urías GUA | 1:32:49 |
| 13 | Benjamín Loréfice ARG | 1:33:19 |
| 14 | Tim Berrett CAN | 1:33:19 |
| 15 | Ademar José Kammler BRA | 1:36:31 |
| 16 | Paul Wick USA | 1:36:41 |
| 17 | José Torres PUR | 1:39:18 |
| 18 | Donald Lawrence USA | 1:39:19 |
| 19 | Alejandro León ESA | 1:41:53 |
| 20 | Gilbert D'Aoust CAN | 1:43:34 |
| 21 | Ottoniel Archila GUA | 1:44:22 |
| 22 | Jeff Cassin CAN | 1:44:29 |
| 23 | Juan Hernández PUR | 1:44:40 |
| 24 | Hugo Leonel López GUA | 1:45:17 |
| 25 | Julio René Martínez GUA | 1:48:49 |
| 26 | Edgardo Rodríguez PUR | 1:49:40 |
| 27 | Marvin de León GUA | 1:57:41 |
| — | Steven Pecinovsky USA | DQ |
| — | Jorge Loréfice ARG | DQ |

^{*}: Started as a guest out of competition.

==== Team ====
| Place | Country | Points |
|---|---|---|
| 1st place, gold medalist(s) | (Mexico) México | 78 pts |
| 2nd place, silver medalist(s) | Brazil | 60 pts |
| 3rd place, bronze medalist(s) | United States | 50 pts |
| 4 | Canada | 45 pts |
| 5 | Guatemala | 27 pts |
| 6 | Puerto Rico | 18 pts |
| 7 | Argentina | 15 pts |
| 8 | El Salvador | 9 pts |

=== Men's 50 km ===
| Place | Athlete | Time |
|---|---|---|
| 1st place, gold medalist(s) | Martín Bermúdez MEX | 3:51:30 |
| 2nd place, silver medalist(s) | Francisco Reyes MEX | 3:59:34 |
| 3rd place, bronze medalist(s) | José Víctor Alonzo GUA | 4:03:38 |
| —^{*} | Daniel García MEX | 4:05:47 |
| —^{*} | Javier Rodríguez MEX | 4:08:52 |
| —^{*} | Rene Estrada MEX | 4:09:18 |
| 4 | Paulo Vidales MEX | 4:14:08 |
| —^{*} | German Sánchez MEX | 4:14:22 |
| 5 | Eugene Kitts USA | 4:19:27 |
| 6 | Richard Fenton USA | 4:25:53 |
| 7 | Nelson Eduardo Funes GUA | 4:36:07 |
| 8 | Curt Clausen USA | 4:38:18 |
| 9 | Eduardo Rivera GUA | 4:41:43 |
| 10 | Antônio Maurício Nogueira BRA | 4:44:29 |
| 11 | Ray Sharp USA | 4:51:35 |
| 12 | Antônio Kohler BRA | 4:52:37 |
| 13 | Ademir Domingues BRA | 4:54:42 |
| — | Daniel O'Connor USA | DQ |
| — | Arturo Bravo MEX | DQ |
| — | Hernán Andrade MEX | DNF |

^{*}: Started as a guest out of competition.

==== Team ====
| Place | Country | Points |
|---|---|---|
| 1st place, gold medalist(s) | (Mexico) México | 35 pts |
| 2nd place, silver medalist(s) | Guatemala | 22 pts |
| 3rd place, bronze medalist(s) | United States | 20 pts |
| 4 | Brazil | 8 pts |

=== Women's 10 km ===
| Place | Athlete | Time |
|---|---|---|
| 1st place, gold medalist(s) | Graciela Mendoza MEX | 46:07 |
| 2nd place, silver medalist(s) | Janice McCaffrey CAN | 46:41 |
| —^{*} | Marisela Chávez MEX | 46:48 |
| 3rd place, bronze medalist(s) | Francisca Martínez MEX | 47:06 |
| 4 | Teresa Vaill USA | 47:18 |
| 5 | María de la Luz Colín MEX | 48:11 |
| 6 | Holly Gerke CAN | 48:22 |
| 7 | Miriam Ramón ECU | 48:37 |
| 8 | Tina Poitras CAN | 48:43 |
| —^{*} | Margarita Sánchez MEX | 48:50 |
| —^{*} | Elvia Jiménez MEX | 48:54 |
| 9 | Debbie Van Orden USA | 49:03 |
| —^{*} | Silvia Valle MEX | 49:05 |
| 10 | María del Rosario Sánchez MEX | 49:47 |
| —^{*} | Sandra Guadalupe Colín MEX | 50:11 |
| 11 | Wendy Sharp USA | 50:27 |
| 12 | Luisa Nivicela ECU | 50:38 |
| 13 | Alison Baker CAN | 51:28 |
| 14 | Sara Standley USA | 51:29 |
| 15 | Bertha Vera ECU | 52:09 |
| 16 | Ivana Rubia Henn BRA | 55:18 |
| 17 | Angelamar da Silva BRA | 55:48 |
| 18 | María Magdalena Guzmán ESA | 56:22 |
| 19 | Claudina Barrera GUA | 1:03:01 |
| 20 | Reyna Gómez GUA | 1:03:32 |
| 21 | Mabel Contreras GUA | 1:04:40 |
| 22 | María Ambrosio GUA | 1:05:19 |
| —^{*} | María Elena Meda GUA | 1:14:36 |
| — | Eva Machuca MEX | DQ |

^{*}: Started as a guest out of competition.

==== Team ====
| Place | Country | Points |
|---|---|---|
| 1st place, gold medalist(s) | (Mexico) México | 64 pts |
| 2nd place, silver medalist(s) | Canada | 59 pts |
| 3rd place, bronze medalist(s) | United States | 48 pts |
| 4 | Ecuador | 41 pts |
| 5 | Brazil | 15 pts |
| 6 | Guatemala | 12 pts |
| 7 | El Salvador | 6 pts |

== Participation ==
The participation of 69 athletes (+ 16 guests) from 9 countries is reported.

- Argentina (2)
- Brazil (9)
- Canada (8)
- Ecuador (3)
- El Salvador (2)
- Guatemala (12)
- (Mexico) México (15)
- Puerto Rico (3)
- United States (14)

== See also ==
- 1990 Race Walking Year Ranking
