= 2007 Pan American Race Walking Cup =

- Organisers: Pan American Race Walking Committee
- Edition: 13th
- Date: 21–22 April
- Host city: Balneário Camboriú, Santa Catarina, Brazil
- Venue: Avenida Atlântica
- Events: 5
- Participation: 97 (+ 7 guests) athletes from 14 nations

The 2007 Pan American Race Walking Cup was held in Balneário Camboriú, Santa Catarina, Brazil. The track of the Cup runs in the Avenida Atlântica.

A detailed report was given. Complete results were published.

== Medallists ==
Event	Gold		Silver		Bronze	
Men
10 km walk (junior event)	Mauricio Arteaga (ECU)	43:49	Yassir Cabrera (PAN)	44:19	Djaime Pedroso de Oliveira (BRA)	44:27
20 km walk	Jefferson Pérez (ECU)	1:25:08	Gustavo Restrepo (COL)	1:25:09	Luis Fernando López (COL)	1:25:25
50 km walk	Álvaro García (MEX)	4:04:52	Fredy Hernández (COL)	4:05:16	Fausto Quinde (ECU)	4:10:08
Men (Team)
Team 10 km walk (junior event)	Ecuador	6 pts	Brazil	11 pts	Colombia	13 pts
Team 20 km walk	Colombia	13 pts	(Mexico) México	23 pts	United States	37 pts
Team 50 km walk	United States	24 pts				
Women
10 km walk (junior event)	Maritza Guamán (ECU)	51:24	Leslie Guavita (COL)	51:32	Lauren Forgues (USA)	51:39
20 km walk	Cristina López (ESA)	1:39:21	Miriam Ramón (ECU)	1:39:42	Yadira Guamán (ECU)	1:41:08
Women (Team)
Team 10 km walk (junior event)	Ecuador	6 pts	Colombia	6 pts	United States	11 pts
Team 20 km walk	(Mexico) México	21 pts	Ecuador	22 pts	Brazil	35 pts

== Results ==
=== Men's 20 km ===
Place	Athlete	Time
1st place, gold medalist(s)	Jefferson Pérez ECU	1:25:08
2nd place, silver medalist(s)	Gustavo Restrepo COL	1:25:09
3rd place, bronze medalist(s)	Luis Fernando López COL	1:25:25
4	Cristian Berdeja MEX	1:26:07
—^{*}	Erick Guevara MEX	1:26:47
5	Eder Sánchez Terán MEX	1:28:20
6	Kevin Eastler USA	1:29:47
7	James Rendón COL	1:32:35
8	Rafael Fontenelle Duarte BRA	1:33:58
9	Patricio Ortega ECU	1:34:56
10	Pavel Chihuán PER	1:35:12
11	Juan Manuel Cano ARG	1:35:40
12	Daniel García Córdova MEX	1:36:10
13	Tim Seaman USA	1:38:31
14	Fabio Benito González ARG	1:46:48
15	Allen James USA	1:46:51
—^{*}	Sidnei José Rodrigues BRA	1:48:11
—	Andrés Chocho ECU	DQ
—	Vidal Delgado PAR	DQ
—	José Alessandro Bernardo Bagio BRA	DNF
—	Sérgio Vieira Galdino BRA	DNF
—	Calisto José Savegnani BRA	DNF
—	Omar Segura MEX	DNF
—	Matthew Boyles USA	DNF

^{*}: Started as a guest out of competition.

==== Team ====
Place	Country	Points
1st place, gold medalist(s)	Colombia	13 pts
2nd place, silver medalist(s)	(Mexico) México	23 pts
3rd place, bronze medalist(s)	United States	37 pts

=== Men's 50 km ===
Place	Athlete	Time
1st place, gold medalist(s)	Álvaro García MEX	4:04:52
2nd place, silver medalist(s)	Fredy Hernández COL	4:05:16
3rd place, bronze medalist(s)	Fausto Quinde ECU	4:10:08
4	Philip Dunn USA	4:14:58
5	Rodrigo Moreno COL	4:18:28
6	Ricardo Reyes ESA	4:18:45
7	David Guadalupe López MEX	4:20:23
8	Cláudio Richardson dos Santos BRA	4:26:39
9	Raymond Sharp USA	4:33:00
10	Alex Jara CHI	4:37:09
11	Curt Clausen USA	4:40:27
12	Edwin Centeno PER	4:44:48
13	Mark Green USA	4:45:07
14	Wellington Luiz Souza BRA	4:48:08
—	David Guevara ECU	DQ
—	Jorge Segura MEX	DQ
—	Claudio Erasmo Vargas MEX	DQ
—	Mário José dos Santos BRA	DNF
—	Segundo Peñafiel ECU	DNF
—^{*}	Bernardo Segura MEX	DNF

^{*}: Started as a guest out of competition.

==== Team ====
Place	Country	Points
1st place, gold medalist(s)	United States	24 pts

=== Men's 10 km (Junior) ===
Place	Athlete	Time
1st place, gold medalist(s)	Mauricio Arteaga ECU	43:49
2nd place, silver medalist(s)	Yassir Cabrera PAN	44:19
3rd place, bronze medalist(s)	Djaime Pedroso de Oliveira BRA	44:27
4	Emerson Hernández ESA	44:30
5	Claudio Villanueva ECU	44:41
6	Omar Sierra COL	45:13
7	Jorge Armando Ruiz COL	45:14
8	Caio Bonfim BRA	45:40
9	Camilo Acuña CHI	46:00
10	Felipe Toloza CHI	48:19
—^{*}	Rudney Dias Nogueira BRA	49:41
11	Alexandre Gagné CAN	49:56
12	Tiago Nascimento Fonseca BRA	50:48
13	Ricardo Vergara USA	
14	Roberto Vergara USA	52:24
15	Ronald Quispe BOL	54:13
—	Ricardo Loján ECU	DQ
—	Víctor Hugo Mendoza ESA	DQ
—^{*}	Pedro Augusto Moura Severo BRA	DNF

^{*}: Started as a guest out of competition.

==== Team ====
Place	Country	Points
1st place, gold medalist(s)	Ecuador	6 pts
2nd place, silver medalist(s)	Brazil	11 pts
3rd place, bronze medalist(s)	Colombia	13 pts
4	Chile	19 pts
5	United States	29 pts

=== Women's 20 km ===
Place	Athlete	Time
1st place, gold medalist(s)	Cristina López ESA	1:39:21
2nd place, silver medalist(s)	Miriam Ramón ECU	1:39:42
3rd place, bronze medalist(s)	Yadira Guamán ECU	1:41:08
4	Verónica Colindres ESA	1:41:29
5	Rosario Sánchez MEX	1:42:16
6	Cisiane Lopes BRA	1:42:20
7	Esther Sánchez MEX	1:43:13
8	Luz Leydi Villamarín COL	1:43:29
9	Daisy González MEX	1:43:29
10	Rachel Lavallée CAN	1:44:17
11	Tânia Regina Spindler BRA	1:45:43
12	Samantha Cohen USA	1:45:53
13	Jolene Moore USA	1:47:48
14	Gladys Marlen Larrota COL	1:48:15
15	Marina Crivello CAN	1:49:28
—^{*}	Claudia Ortega MEX	1:49:42
16	Johana Ordóñez ECU	1:49:48
17	Marcela Pacheco CHI	1:50:13
18	Érica de Sena BRA	1:50:47
19	Maria Michta-Coffey USA	1:53:55
—^{*}	Elianay da Silva Pereira BRA	1:56:21
20	Josette Sepúlveda CHI	1:59:04
—	Sandra Zapata COL	DQ
—	Rocío Alcántara MEX	DQ
—	Alessandra Picagevicz BRA	DNF
—	Johana Malla ECU	DNF
—	Loretta Schuellein USA	DNF

^{*}: Started as a guest out of competition.

==== Team ====
Place	Country	Points
1st place, gold medalist(s)	(Mexico) México	21 pts
2nd place, silver medalist(s)	Ecuador	22 pts
3rd place, bronze medalist(s)	Brazil	35 pts
4	United States	45 pts

=== Women's 10 km (Junior) ===
Place	Athlete	Time
1st place, gold medalist(s)	Maritza Guamán ECU	51:24
2nd place, silver medalist(s)	Leslie Guavita COL	51:32
3rd place, bronze medalist(s)	Lauren Forgues USA	51:39
4	Ingrid Hernández COL	52:25
5	Gabriela Cornejo ECU	54:23
6	Cirila Cume ECU	55:35
7	Mayara Luize Vixentainer BRA	55:51
8	Le'erin Voss USA	55:58
9	Pámela Patricia da Silva BRA	56:35
—^{*}	Vanessa dos Santos Néri BRA	56:38
10	Aline Luisa Sausen BRA	57:56
11	Wilane Cuebas PUR	1:01:29
—	Christina Peters USA	DQ
—^{*}	Liliane Priscila Barbosa BRA	DQ

^{*}: Started as a guest out of competition.

==== Team ====
Place	Country	Points
1st place, gold medalist(s)	Ecuador	6 pts
2nd place, silver medalist(s)	Colombia	6 pts
3rd place, bronze medalist(s)	United States	11 pts
4	Brazil	16 pts

== Participation ==
The participation of 97 athletes from 14 countries is reported.

- Argentina (2)
- Bolivia (1)
- Brazil (17)
- Canada (3)
- Chile (5)
- Colombia (12)
- Ecuador (16)
- El Salvador (5)
- (Mexico) México (12)
- (Panama) Panamá (1)
- Paraguay (1)
- (Peru) Perú (2)
- Puerto Rico (1)
- United States (17)

== See also ==
- 2007 Race Walking Year Ranking
