= Masters W55 4 × 400 metres relay world record progression =

This is the progression of world record improvements of the 4 × 400 metres relay W55 division of Masters athletics.

Key

Incomplete information Pending

Time	Athletes	Nationality	Birthdates	Location	Date	Ref
4:23.52	Sue McDonald; Lisa Valle; Michelle Rohl; Roxanne Brockner	United States	29 March 1963; 29 April 1966; 12 November 1965; 27 December 1965	Ames	25 July 2021	
4:27.33	Julie Rogers; Christine Anthony; Janice Ellacott; Virginia Mitchell	Great Britain	15 January 1964; 26 January 1963; 5 November 1960; 29 January 1963	Caorle	15 September 2019	
