= 1984 Pan American Race Walking Cup =

- Organisers: Pan American Race Walking Committee
- Edition: 1st
- Date: 3–4 November
- Host city: Bucaramanga, Santander, Colombia
- Venue: Carrera 27, between Calle 11 and 22
- Events: 3
- Participation: 61 athletes from 11 nations

The inaugural 1984 Pan American Race Walking Cup was held in Bucaramanga, Santander, Colombia, on 3–4 November. The track of the Cup runs in the Carrera 27, between Calle 11 and 22.

Complete results, medal winners until 2011, and the results for the Mexican athletes were published.

== Medallists ==
Event	Gold		Silver		Bronze	
Men
20 km walk	Querubín Moreno (COL)	1:25:19	Guillaume LeBlanc (CAN)	1:27:06	Héctor Moreno (COL)	1:27:09
50 km walk	Pedro Aroche (MEX)	4:12:44	Víctor Sánchez (MEX)	4:17:52	Ignacio Buendia (MEX)	4:18:41
Men (Team)
Team 20 km walk	Colombia	64 pts	(Mexico) México	60 pts	Puerto Rico	41 pts
Team 50 km walk	(Mexico) México	70 pts	Colombia	60 pts	Puerto Rico	48 pts
Women
10 km walk	Ann Peel (CAN)	49:41	Janice McCaffrey (CAN)	50:15	Esther Lopez (USA)	50:55
Women (Team)
Team 10 km walk	Canada	33 pts	United States	22 pts	(Mexico) México	17 pts

== Results ==
=== Men's 20 km ===
Place	Athlete	Time
1st place, gold medalist(s)	Querubín Moreno COL	1:25:19
2nd place, silver medalist(s)	Guillaume LeBlanc CAN	1:27:06
3rd place, bronze medalist(s)	Héctor Moreno COL	1:27:09
4	Jaime López MEX	1:28:30
5	Miguel Martínez MEX	1:31:13
6	Ray Funkhouser USA	1:33:41
7	Marcelino Colín MEX	1:35:27
8	Mauricio Villegas MEX	1:35:52
9	José Víctor Alonzo GUA	1:35:57
10	Clodomiro Moreno COL	1:36:27
11	Daniel Lévesque CAN	1:38:06
12	Ricardo Lamprea COL	1:40:35
13	David Felix PUR	1:42:27
14	Nicolás Soto PUR	1:43:05
15	Cláudio de Souza Lima BRA	1:43:25
16	Ricardo Concepción PAN	1:46:37
17	Juan Hernández PUR	1:48:50
18	Omar Castillo VEN	1:49:17
19	Julio Yanga ECU	1:49:38
20	Claudio Bertolino BRA	1:51:03
21	Raúl Yanga ECU	1:53:51
22	Edgard Rodríguez VEN	1:57:30
23	Tomás Alvarez GUA	1:58:48
24	Luis Chocho ECU	1:59:30
25	Losimar de Carvalho BRA	1:59:30
26	Henry Mercado PUR	2:01:27
—	François Lapointe CAN	DQ
—	Carlos Rodríguez ECU	DNF

==== Team ====
Place	Country	Points
1st place, gold medalist(s)	Colombia	64 pts
2nd place, silver medalist(s)	(Mexico) México	60 pts
3rd place, bronze medalist(s)	Puerto Rico	41 pts
4	Canada	39 pts
5	Brazil	28 pts
6	Ecuador	22 pts
7	Venezuela	19 pts
8	Guatemala	18 pts

=== Men's 50 km ===
Place	Athlete	Time
1st place, gold medalist(s)	Pedro Aroche MEX	4:12:44
2nd place, silver medalist(s)	Víctor Sánchez MEX	4:17:52
3rd place, bronze medalist(s)	Ignacio Buendia MEX	4:18:41
4	Carl Schueler USA	4:20:56
5	Jesús Flores CUB	4:29:57
6	Enrique Peña COL	4:34:54
7	Ernesto Alfaro COL	4:53:17
8	Wilson Arango COL	5:05:17
9	Axel Guzmán PUR	5:08:30
10	Juan Yáñez VEN	5:19:19
11	José Miranda PUR	5:21:53
12	Juan Limpio VEN	5:37:02
—	Hernán Andrade MEX	DQ
—	Arturo Roldán GUA	DQ
—	Jorge Quiñónez COL	DNF
—	Omar Castillo COL	DNF

==== Team ====
Place	Country	Points
1st place, gold medalist(s)	(Mexico) México	70 pts
2nd place, silver medalist(s)	Colombia	60 pts
3rd place, bronze medalist(s)	Puerto Rico	48 pts
4	Venezuela	32 pts

=== Women's 10 km ===
Place	Athlete	Time
1st place, gold medalist(s)	Ann Peel CAN	49:41
2nd place, silver medalist(s)	Janice McCaffrey CAN	50:15
3rd place, bronze medalist(s)	Esther Lopez USA	50:55
4	Alison Baker CAN	51:10
5	María de la Luz Colín MEX	51:23
6	Teresa Vaill USA	51:29
7	Estela Rodarte MEX	53:31
8	Susan Liers USA	54:13
9	Elsa Abril COL	54:27
10	María del Carmen Hidalgo MEX	54:52
11	Chris Anderson USA	55:10
12	Margarita Moreles CUB	55:50
13	Fabiola Arango COL	55:57
14	Graciela Teheran MEX	58:08
15	Rosa Arroyave COL	59:20
16	Claudia Sainer COL	1:01:06
17	Blanca González CUB	1:02:10

==== Team ====
Place	Country	Points
1st place, gold medalist(s)	Canada	33 pts
2nd place, silver medalist(s)	United States	22 pts
3rd place, bronze medalist(s)	(Mexico) México	17 pts
4	Colombia	7 pts

== Participation ==
The participation of 61 athletes from 11 countries is reported.

- Brazil (14)
- Canada (4)
- Colombia (17)
- Cuba (4)
- Ecuador (17)
- Guatemala (12)
- (Mexico) México (19)
- (Panama) Panamá (2)
- Puerto Rico (6)
- United States (13)
- Venezuela (9)

== See also ==
- 1984 Race Walking Year Ranking
