= Alberto Cruz (race walker) =

Mexican race walker

Medal record

Men's athletics

Representing Mexico

IAAF World Race Walking Cup
Bronze medal – third place	1993 Monterrey	20 km walk

Alberto Cruz (born 6 June 1972) is a Mexican former racewalker. He was a world junior champion and took a bronze medal at the 1993 IAAF World Race Walking Cup. Amongst his senior honours are gold medals from the Central American and Caribbean and Ibero-American Championships.

== Career ==
Cruz was highly successful as a junior athlete. He won three straight golds at the Central American and Caribbean Junior Championships in Athletics, winning his first at the age of fourteen in 1986 and his last in 1990. He became world junior champion in 1988 and returned two years later to defend his title, narrowly finishing second behind Ilya Markov (who would go on to win an Olympic medal in the sport). Cruz also won two consecutive gold medals at the Pan American Junior Athletics Championships (1989 and 1991).

On his senior debut for Mexico, a sixteen-year-old Cruz was disqualified at the 1988 Pan American Race Walking Cup. He performed well in his subsequent outings, however, taking tenth at the 1989 IAAF World Indoor Championships and fourth at the 1990 Pan American Race Walking Cup, which was held on hom turf and saw a Mexican sweep of the top four with Ernesto Canto, Joel Sánchez and Carlos Mercenario.

He established himself regionally with a gold medal win at the 1991 Central American and Caribbean Championships in Athletics held in Xalapa, Mexico, beating his compatriot and runner-up Víctor Sánchez by over three minutes. His finishing time of 1:27:09 hours was a championship record. Another gold medal followed in the 20,000 metres track walk at the 1992 Ibero-American Championships in Athletics, bettering South American opposition in Clodomiro Moreno and Jefferson Pérez.

Cruz appeared to signify a move into the global elite with a bronze medal at the 1993 IAAF World Race Walking Cup, joining countryman Daniel García on the podium in Monterrey, Mexico. However, this proved to be one of the last high-profile performances of his career. He made one more international outing at the 2000 Pan American Race Walking Cup, but failed to finish the event.

== International competitions ==
Year	Competition	Venue	Position	Event	Notes
1986	CAC Junior Championships	Mexico City, Mexico	1st	5000 m walk	22:57
1988	CAC Junior Championships	Nassau, Bahamas	1st	10,000 m walk	46:05
1988	World Junior Championships	Sudbury, Canada	1st	10,000 m walk	41:16.11
1988	Pan American Race Walking Cup	Mar de Plata, Argentina	—	20 km walk	DQ
1989	World Indoor Championships	Budapest, Hungary	10th	5000 m walk	20:18.99
1989	Pan American Junior Championships	Santa Fe, Argentina	1st	10,000 m walk	42:00.21
1990	CAC Junior Championships	Havana, Cuba	1st	10,000 m walk	44:11.00
1990	World Junior Championships	Plovdiv, Bulgaria	2nd	10,000 m walk	39:56.49
1990	Pan American Race Walking Cup	Xalapa, Mexico	4th	20 km walk	1:22:52
1991	Pan American Junior Championships	Kingston, Jamaica	1st	10,000 m walk	42:38.51
1991	CAC Championships	Xalapa, Mexico	1st	20 km walk	1:27:09 CR
1992	Ibero-American Championships	Seville, Spain	1st	20,000 m walk	1:25:35.9
1992	Pan American Race Walking Cup	Guatemala City, Guatemala	3rd	20 km walk	1:28:32
1993	World Race Walking Cup	Monterrey, Mexico	3rd	20 km walk	1:24:37
2000	Pan American Race Walking Cup	Poza Rica, Mexico	—	20 km walk	DQ
