= 2011 Pan American Race Walking Cup =

- Organisers: Pan American Race Walking Committee
- Edition: 15th
- Date: 26–27 March
- Host city: Envigado, Antioquia, Colombia
- Venue: Avenida Las Vegas, Barrio Primavera
- Events: 5
- Participation: 123 athletes from 17 nations

The 2011 Pan American Race Walking Cup was held in Envigado, Antioquia, Colombia on 26–27 March. The track of the Cup runs in the Avenida Las Vegas, Barrio Primavera.

Complete results were published.

== Medallists ==
Event	Gold		Silver		Bronze	
Men
10 km walk (junior event)	Éider Arévalo (COL)	40:40	José Leonardo Montaña (COL)	41:51	Jesús Tadeo Vega (MEX)	42:29
20 km walk	Luis Fernando López (COL)	1:25:04	Érick Barrondo (GUA)	1:25:56	Giovanni Torres (MEX)	1:26:18
50 km walk	Cristian Berdeja (MEX)	3:59:14	Fredy Hernández (COL)	3:59:40	Rolando Saquipay (ECU)	4:01:20
Men (Team)
Team 10 km walk (junior event)	Colombia	3 pts	(Mexico) México	7 pts	Ecuador	17 pts
Team 20 km walk	(Mexico) México	12 pts	United States	39 pts	Ecuador	41 pts
Team 50 km walk	Colombia	11 pts	(Mexico) México	15 pts		
Women
10 km walk (junior event)	Yanelli Caballero (MEX)	47:23	Kimberly García (PER)	49:13	Yuli Capcha (PER)	49:34
20 km walk	Jamy Franco (GUA)	1:36:04	Arabelly Orjuela (COL)	1:36:12	Ingrid Hernández (COL)	1:37:18
Women (Team)
Team 10 km walk (junior event)	(Peru) Perú	5 pts	(Mexico) México	7 pts	Bolivia	12 pts
Team 20 km walk	Colombia	10 pts	(Mexico) México	24 pts	Ecuador	36 pts

== Results ==
=== Men's 20 km ===
Place	Athlete	Time
1st place, gold medalist(s)	Luis Fernando López COL	1:25:04
2nd place, silver medalist(s)	Érick Barrondo GUA	1:25:56
3rd place, bronze medalist(s)	Giovanni Torres MEX	1:26:18
4	Diego Flores MEX	1:26:23
5	Isaac Palma MEX	1:26:38
6	Ferney Rojas COL	1:27:08
7	Aníbal Paau GUA	1:28:02
8	Mauricio Arteaga ECU	1:29:14
9	David Mejía MEX	1:29:37
10	Caio Bonfim BRA	1:31:00
11	John Nunn USA	1:31:26
12	Patrick Stroupe USA	1:33:09
13	Ronald Quispe BOL	1:33:16
14	Pavel Chihuán PER	1:33:25
15	José Antonio Fernandez ECU	1:34:39
16	Dan Seriani USA	1:34:50
17	Yerko Araya CHI	1:35:40
18	José Rubio ECU	1:36:10
19	Camilo Acuña CHI	1:38:43
20	Luis Ángel López PUR	1:40:03
21	Salvador Mira ESA	1:42:09
22	Luis Sevilla VEN	1:50:43
—	Edward Araya CHI	DQ
—	James Rendón COL	DQ
—	Yassir Cabrera PAN	DNF
—	Creighton Connolly CAN	DNF
—	Mário José dos Santos Júnior BRA	DNF
—	Jonathan Rieckmann BRA	DNF
—	Yerenman Salazar VEN	DNF
—	Andrés Chocho ECU	DNF

==== Team ====
Place	Country	Points
1st place, gold medalist(s)	(Mexico) México	12 pts
2nd place, silver medalist(s)	United States	39 pts
3rd place, bronze medalist(s)	Ecuador	41 pts

=== Men's 50 km ===
Place	Athlete	Time
1st place, gold medalist(s)	Cristian Berdeja MEX	3:59:14
2nd place, silver medalist(s)	Fredy Hernández COL	3:59:40
3rd place, bronze medalist(s)	Rolando Saquipay ECU	4:01:20
4	Néstor Rueda COL	4:10:14
5	Rodrigo Moreno COL	4:13:27
6	José Ventura MEX	4:15:22
7	Cláudio Richardson dos Santos BRA	4:22:46
8	Luis Solís MEX	4:27:08
9	Bernardo Calvo CRC	4:29:58
10	David Guevara ECU	4:30:10
11	Wilman Vera VEN	4:44:37
12	Sergio Gutiérrez CRC	5:04:35
13	Samir César Sabadim BRA	5:40:08
—	Omar Sierra COL	DQ
—	Luiz Felipe dos Santos BRA	DNF
—	Allan Segura CRC	DNF
—	Mesías Zapata ECU	DNF
—	Edgar Cudco ECU	DNF
—	Juan Toscano MEX	DNF
—	Jonathan Matthews USA	DNF

==== Team ====
Place	Country	Points
1st place, gold medalist(s)	Colombia	11 pts
2nd place, silver medalist(s)	(Mexico) México	15 pts

=== Men's 10 km (Junior) ===
Place	Athlete	Time
1st place, gold medalist(s)	Éider Arévalo COL	40:39.65
2nd place, silver medalist(s)	José Leonardo Montaña COL	41:50.65
3rd place, bronze medalist(s)	Jesús Tadeo Vega MEX	42:28.50
4	Cristian Gómez MEX	43:07.10
5	Jhon Castañeda COL	43:31.00
6	Brian Pintado ECU	43:39.15
7	Usiel Sánchez MEX	44:28.15
8	Marco Antonio Rodríguez BOL	45:40.20
9	Niel García PER	45:53.45
10	Tyler Sorensen USA	46:25.45
11	Óscar Joel Villavicencio ECU	47:20.15
12	José Mauricio Sarango ECU	47:56.10
13	José Meléndez PUR	48:04.55
14	Jan Ramírez PUR	48:30.05
15	Sergio Carrillo PER	48:40.75
16	Jean Pedro Rominhuk BRA	49:05.10
17	Alex Chavez USA	49:12.55
18	Hudson Fernando Muniz Santos BRA	50:09.00
19	Richard Vargas VEN	50:39.25
20	Deiby Cordero CRC	51:51.55
21	César Cristian Escobar ESA	52:08.45
—	Bryan Barahona ESA	DQ

==== Team ====
Place	Country	Points
1st place, gold medalist(s)	Colombia	3 pts
2nd place, silver medalist(s)	(Mexico) México	7 pts
3rd place, bronze medalist(s)	Ecuador	17 pts
4	(Peru) Perú	24 pts
5	United States	27 pts
6	Puerto Rico	27 pts
7	Brazil	34 pts

=== Women's 20 km ===
Place	Athlete	Time
1st place, gold medalist(s)	Jamy Franco GUA	1.36:04
2nd place, silver medalist(s)	Arabelly Orjuela COL	1:36:12
3rd place, bronze medalist(s)	Ingrid Hernández COL	1:37:18
4	Cisiane Lopes BRA	1:38:02
5	Sandra Galvis COL	1:38:20
6	María Guadalupe Sánchez MEX	1:38:44
7	Mónica Equihua MEX	1:38:44
8	Érica Rocha de Sena BRA	1:38:45
9	Paola Pérez ECU	1:39:35
10	Claudia Balderrama BOL	1:39:41
11	Rosalía Ortiz MEX	1:40:17
12	Maritza Guamán ECU	1:40:18
13	Mirna Ortiz GUA	1:41:34
14	Leysi Rodríguez CUB	1:41:53
15	Yadira Guamán ECU	1:44:10
16	Erin Gray USA	1:44:23
17	Milangela Rosales VEN	1:45:17
18	Solomiya Login USA	1:49:28
19	Francisca Ferris PAN	1:50:55
20	Erin Talcott USA	1:51:51
21	Sonnia Cartagena ECU	1:53:31
22	Susan Randall USA	1:53:43
—	Angélica Hernández MEX	DQ

==== Team ====
Place	Country	Points
1st place, gold medalist(s)	Colombia	10 pts
2nd place, silver medalist(s)	(Mexico) México	24 pts
3rd place, bronze medalist(s)	Ecuador	36 pts
4	United States	54 pts

=== Women's 10 km (Junior) ===
Place	Athlete	Time
1st place, gold medalist(s)	Yanelli Caballero MEX	47:23
2nd place, silver medalist(s)	Kimberly García PER	49:13
3rd place, bronze medalist(s)	Yuli Capcha PER	49:34
4	Sandra Arenas COL	49:51
5	Wendy Cornejo BOL	50:36
6	Sandra Nevárez MEX	50:51
7	Ángela Castro BOL	51:29
8	María Mena MEX	52:04
9	Magaly Bonilla ECU	53:30
10	Ana Karina Bustos ECU	54:22
11	Natalia Alfonso VEN	55:03
12	Ana Leidy Daza COL	55:58
13	Erika Shaver USA	57:12
14	Yanet Farfán COL	57:28
15	Jéssica Janine Santos de Souza BRA	58:00
16	Andressa Souza da Silva BRA	58:17
17	Maite Moscoso USA	58:32
18	Nicolette Sorensen USA	59:18
19	Katherine Marisol Álvarez ECU	1:01:24
20	Andreína Gonzales DOM	1:03:43
21	Paula Raissa Paz da Silva BRA	1:04:48

==== Team ====
Place	Country	Points
1st place, gold medalist(s)	(Peru) Perú	5 pts
2nd place, silver medalist(s)	(Mexico) México	7 pts
3rd place, bronze medalist(s)	Bolivia	12 pts
4	Colombia	16 pts
5	Ecuador	19 pts
6	United States	30 pts
7	Brazil	31 pts

== Participation ==
The participation of 123 athletes from 17 countries is reported.

- Bolivia (5)
- Brazil (13)
- Canada (1)
- Chile (3)
- Colombia (16)
- Costa Rica (4)
- Cuba (1)
- Dominican Republic (1)
- Ecuador (18)
- El Salvador (3)
- Guatemala (4)
- (Mexico) México (18)
- (Panama) Panamá (2)
- (Peru) Perú (5)
- Puerto Rico (3)
- United States (13)
- Venezuela (6)
