= Pedro Aroche =

Mexican racewalker

Personal information
- Full name: Pedro Aroche de los Monteros
- Born: March 14, 1946 (age 80)
- Height: 1.70 m (5 ft 7 in)
- Weight: 59 kg (130 lb)

Sport
- Country: Mexico
- Sport: Athletics
- Event: Racewalking
- Updated on 25 July 2013

Pedro Aroche de los Monteros (born March 14, 1946) is a retired male race walker from Mexico.

In 1977 he participated in the Søfteland Grand Prix at Fana stadion in Bergen, Norway. A squad of Mexican race walkers had been recruited to an attempt on the world record in the 50,000 metres track walk. Two days after Daniel Bautista broke the world record in the 20,000 metres track walk, the 50,000 metres contest was held. Pedro Aroche and Raúl González were vying for the lead for over half the race, past the 30,000 metre mark. They were then overtaken by compatriot Enrique Vera around the 35,000 metre mark, and in their attempts to follow Vera (who eventually broke the world record), both Aroche and González quit the race. Reported Bergens Tidende, Vera's coach Jerzy Hausleber had believed that either Aroche or González would be the record setter.

In 1978, Aroche returned to Norway to walk the same distance in another attempt on Vera's world record, this time staged in Førde due to track rehabilitation at Fana. Raúl González started well and was 10 minutes below the world record time when passing 25,000 metres. A slower second half recudec González' gap to four minutes, but he took the world record in 3:54.23.5 hours, ahead of Aroche who finished in 4:11.29 and Martín Bermúdez in 4:14.24. Participants from other nations all forfeited the race.

At the 1979 Søfteland Grand Prix, a road race, Aroche finished second behind Anatoliy Solomin. The same placement came in Mexico City in April 1985; this time a Norwegian walker Erling Andersen had been invited there, and won. According to Norwegian media, the race was spectated by 500,000 in "the Mecca of race walking, which Mexico is".

== Personal bests ==
- 20 km: 1:23:22 hrs – 1979

== Achievements ==
Year	Competition	Venue	Position	Event	Notes
Representing Mexico
1972	Olympic Games	Munich, West Germany	12th	20 km	1:33:05
1974	Central American and Caribbean Games	Santo Domingo, Dominican Republic	2nd	20 km	1:35:33
1984	Pan American Race Walking Cup	Bucaramanga, Colombia	1st	50 km	4:12:44
1985	Central American and Caribbean Championships	Nassau, Bahamas	2nd	50 km	4:28:09
