= Arturo Huerta =

Canadian race walker

Personal information
- Born: 30 March 1964 (age 62) Toronto, Canada

Sport
- Sport: Track and field
Medal record
Representing Canada
Commonwealth Games
Silver medal – second place	1998 Kuala Lumpur	20km walk

Arturo S. Huerta (born 30 March 1964) is a Canadian retired athlete who specialised in race walking. He represented his country at two Summer Olympics, in 1996 and 2000, as well as two World Championships. In addition, he won the silver medal at the 1998 Commonwealth Games.

He has personal bests of 1:21:03 in 20 kilometres walk (Toronto 2000) and 3:58:02 in the 50 kilometres walk (Poza Rica 2000).

== Competition record ==
Year	Competition	Venue	Position	Event	Notes
Representing Canada
1992	Pan American Race Walking Cup	Guatemala City, Guatemala	11th	20 km walk	1:34:37
1993	World Race Walking Cup	Monterrey, Mexico	67th	50 km walk	4:51:23
1994	Pan American Race Walking Cup	Atlanta, United States	26th	20 km walk	1:44:14
1996	Olympic Games	Atlanta, United States	42nd	20 km walk	1:28:23
1996	Pan American Race Walking Cup	Manaus, Brazil	8th	20 km walk	1:36:59
1997	World Race Walking Cup	Poděbrady, Czech Republic	72nd	20 km walk	1:25:55
1998	Commonwealth Games	Kuala Lumpur, Malaysia	2nd	20 km walk	1:25:49
1998	Pan American Race Walking Cup	Miami, United States	4th	20 km walk	1:30:35
1999	World Race Walking Cup	Mézidon-Canon, France	10th	20 km walk	1:22:26
1999	Pan American Games	Winnipeg, Manitoba, Canada	5th	20 km walk	1:22:02
1999	World Championships	Seville, Spain	–	20 km walk	DQ
2000	Pan American Race Walking Cup	Poza Rica, Mexico	4th	50 km walk	3:58:02
2000	Olympic Games	Sydney, Australia	24th	20 km walk	1:25:24
2000	Olympic Games	Sydney, Australia	–	50 km walk	DQ
2001	World Championships	Edmonton, Canada	21st	20 km walk	1:29:27
2001	World Championships	Edmonton, Canada	31st	50 km walk	4:25.07
2002	World Race Walking Cup	Turin, Italy	60th	20 km walk	1:34:57
