= Philip Dunn (race walker) =

American racewalker

Personal information
- Born: June 12, 1971 (age 55) Eugene, Oregon, United States

Sport
- Sport: Track and field
Medal record
Representing United States
Pan American Games
Bronze medal – third place	1999 Winnipeg	50km walk

Philip Martin Dunn (born June 12, 1971) is a male race walker from the United States. He competed for his native country in three consecutive Summer Olympics, starting in 2000 (Sydney, Australia). He is a four-time national US champion in the men's 50 km event (2001–2006–2008–2009).

== Achievements ==
Year	Competition	Venue	Position	Event	Notes
Representing the United States
1990	World Junior Championships	Plovdiv, Bulgaria	16th	10,000m	44:45.55
1994	Pan American Race Walking Cup	Atlanta, Georgia	20th	20km	1:35:53
1995	World Race Walking Cup	Beijing, China	86th	20 km	1:35:40
1997	World Race Walking Cup	Poděbrady, Czech Republic	76th	20 km	1:26:36
1998	Pan American Race Walking Cup	Miami, Florida	4th	50km	4:25:30
1999	World Race Walking Cup	Mézidon-Canon, France	45th	50 km	3:59:53
1999	Pan American Games	Winnipeg, Canada	3rd	50 km	4:13:45
2000	Pan American Race Walking Cup	Poza Rica, Mexico	19th	20km	1:35:10
2000	Olympic Games	Sydney, Australia	28th	50km	4:03:05
2001	World Championships	Edmonton, Canada	14th	50 km	3:56:33
2001	Pan American Race Walking Cup	Cuenca, Ecuador	11th	20km	1:38:20
2002	World Race Walking Cup	Turin, Italy	13th	50 km	3:56:13
2003	Pan American Race Walking Cup	Tijuana, Mexico	2nd	50 km	4:15:01
2003	Pan American Games	Santo Domingo, Dominican Republic	5th	50 km	4:25:50
2004	World Race Walking Cup	Naumburg, Germany	82nd	20 km	1:32:28
2004	Olympic Games	Athens, Greece	35th	50 km	4:12:49
2005	Pan American Race Walking Cup	Lima, Peru	8th	50 km	4:18:32
2005	World Championships	Helsinki, Finland	23rd	50 km	4:25:27
2006	World Race Walking Cup	A Coruña, Spain	42nd	50 km	4:16:06
2007	Pan American Race Walking Cup	Balneário Camboriú, Brazil	4th	50 km	4:14:58
2007	Pan American Games	Rio de Janeiro, Brazil	8th	50 km	4:15:47
2008	World Race Walking Cup	Cheboksary, Russia	39th	50 km	4:05:10
2008	Olympic Games	Beijing, China	39th	50 km	4:08:32
