= Carl Schueler =

American race walker

Personal information
- Full name: Carl Francis Schueler
- Born: February 26, 1956 (age 70) Newburyport, Massachusetts, U.S.
- Height: 6 ft 0 in (1.83 m)
- Weight: 154 lb (70 kg)

Sport
- Country: United States
- Sport: Athletics
- Event: Race walking
- Updated on July 27, 2013

Carl Francis Schueler (born February 26, 1956) is an American retired race walker. Schueler was a four time olympian and the first American to walk the 50k under 4 hours.

== Olympics ==
Schueler qualified for the 1980 U.S. Olympic team but was unable to compete due to the 1980 Summer Olympics boycott. He did however receive one of 461 Congressional Gold Medals created especially for the spurned athletes. He was a four time Olympian (1980–1992) and competed in three consecutive Summer Olympics during his career.

== Personal life ==
He has two daughters named Ellie and Margy, and is married to Debora VanOrden, a twice first alternate Olympic team racewalker. Schueler lives in Colorado Springs, Colorado.

== Personal bests ==
- 20 km: 1:25:04 hrs – 1986
- 50 km: 3:57:09 hrs – Rome, Italy, 5 September 1987

== Achievements ==
Year	Competition	Venue	Position	Event	Notes
Representing the United States
1984	Olympic Games	Los Angeles, United States	6th	50 km	3:59:46
1984	Pan American Race Walking Cup	Bucaramanga, Colombia	4th	50 km	4:20:56
1985	World Race Walking Cup	St John's, Isle of Man	19th	50 km	4:13:14
1986	Pan American Race Walking Cup	Saint-Leonard, Canada	9th	20 km	1:25:04
1987	World Championships	Rome, Italy	16th	50 km	3:57:09
1988	Olympic Games	Seoul, South Korea	23rd	50 km	3:57:44
1988	Pan American Race Walking Cup	Mar del Plata, Argentina	6th	20 km	1:31:39
1990	Pan American Race Walking Cup	Xalapa, Mexico	7th	20 km	1:28:21
1991	World Championships	Tokyo, Japan	DNF	50 km	—
1992	Olympic Games	Barcelona, Spain	23rd	50 km	4:13:38

While living in Bethesda, Maryland, Schueler assisted in founding Potomac Valley Track Club, and its annual race walker of the year award is named after him in commemoration for the work he did for them.
