= Omar Zepeda =

Mexican race walker

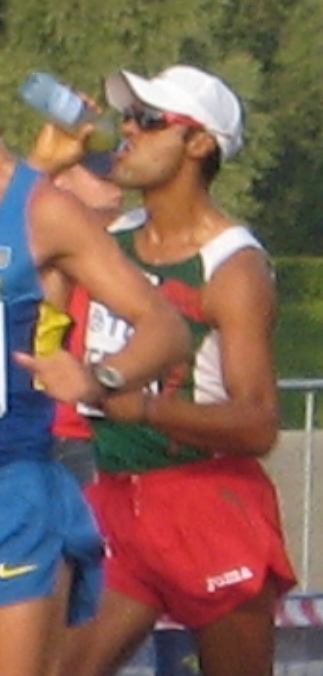
- Zepeda in 2013

Personal information
- Full name: Omar Zepeda de Léon
- Born: 8 June 1977 (age 49) San Mateo Atenco, Mexico
- Height: 1.77 m (5 ft 9 1/2 in)
- Weight: 68 kg (150 lb)

Sport
- Country: Mexico
- Sport: Athletics
- Event: Race walking
Medal record
Men's race walking
Representing Mexico
Pan American Games
Bronze medal – third place	2007 Rio de Janeiro	50 km
- Updated on 24 December 2014

Omar Zepeda de Léon (born 8 July 1977) is a Mexican race walker. He finished sixth in the 50 km race at the 2005 World Championships in a personal best time of 3:49:01 hours. He was the bronze medalist in the 50 kilometres walk at the 2007 Pan American Games.

Also he won the team silver medal with Mexico over 50 km at the 2008 IAAF World Race Walking Cup in Cheboksary, Russia. He has competed at the World Championships in Athletics on six occasions and was 21st over 50 km at the 2011 edition. He won the 50 km race at the Chihuahua meeting on the 2012 IAAF World Race Walking Challenge tour.

== Personal bests ==
=== Track walk ===
- 10,000 m: 40:26.68 min – Monterrey, Mexico, 4 July 2004
- 20,000 m: 1:27:57.5 hrs (ht) – Bergen, Norway, 3 May 1997

=== Road walk ===
- 20 km: 1:21:59 min – Poděbrady, Czech Republic, 19 April 1997
- 50 km: 3:47:35 hrs – Taicang, China, 3 May 2014

== Achievements ==
Year	Competition	Venue	Position	Event	Notes
Representing the Mexico
1997	World Race Walking Cup	Poděbrady, Czech Republic	35th	20 km	1:21:59
1997	World Race Walking Cup	Poděbrady, Czech Republic	3rd	Team (20 km)	403 pts
1997	World Championships	Athens, Greece	18th	20 km	1:25:38
2000	Pan American Race Walking Cup	Poza Rica, Mexico	—	50 km	DNF
2001	Central American and Caribbean Championships	Guatemala City, Guatemala	—	20 km	DNF
2001	World Championships	Edmonton, Canada	—	50 km	DNF
2001	Pan American Race Walking Cup	Cuenca, Ecuador	—	50 km	DSQ
2002	World Race Walking Cup	Turin, Italy	—	50 km	DNF
2003	Pan American Race Walking Cup	Tijuana, Mexico	—	50 km	DNF
2003	Pan American Games	Santo Domingo, Dominican Republic	—	50 km	DSQ
2005	World Championships	Helsinki, Finland	6th	50 km	3:49:01
2006	World Race Walking Cup	A Coruña, Spain	—	50 km	DSQ
2007	Pan American Games	Rio de Janeiro, Brazil	3rd	50 km	3:56:04
2007	World Championships	Osaka, Japan	—	50 km	DSQ
2008	World Race Walking Cup	Cheboksary, Russia	23rd	50 km	3:56:52
2008	World Race Walking Cup	Cheboksary, Russia	2nd	Team (50 km)	29 pts
2009	World Championships	Berlin, Germany	—	50 km	DSQ
2010	World Race Walking Cup	Chihuahua, Mexico	13th	50 km	3:59:39
2010	World Race Walking Cup	Chihuahua, Mexico	2nd	Team (50 km)	22 pts
2011	World Championships	Daegu, South Korea	21st	50 km	3:56:41
2012	World Race Walking Cup	Saransk, Russia	33rd	50 km	4:03:35
2012	World Race Walking Cup	Saransk, Russia	4th	Team (50 km)	49 pts
2012	Olympic Games	London, United Kingdom	22nd	50 km	3:49:14
2013	Pan American Race Walking Cup	Guatemala City, Guatemala	1st	50 km	3:57:52
2013	Pan American Race Walking Cup	Guatemala City, Guatemala	1st	Team (50 km)	12 pts
2013	World Championships	Moscow, Russia	19th	50 km	3:50:43
2014	World Race Walking Cup	Taicang, China	7th	50 km	3:47:35
2014	Central American and Caribbean Games	Xalapa, Mexico	2nd	50 km	3:52:45 A
2015	Pan American Race Walking Cup	Arica, Chile	7th	50 km	3:58:44
2015	Pan American Race Walking Cup	Arica, Chile	1st	Team (50 km)	7 pts
