= Cristian Berdeja =

Mexican race walker (born 1981)

Cristián Berdeja
Personal information
- Full name: Cristián David Berdeja Villavicencio
- Born: June 21, 1981 (age 45) Coyuca de Benítez, Guerrero, Mexico
- Height: 1.70 m (5 ft 7 in)
- Weight: 58 kg (128 lb)

Sport
- Country: Mexico
- Sport: Athletics
- Event: Racewalking
Medal record
Race Walking
Representing Mexico
Central American and Caribbean Games
Bronze medal – third place	2010 Mayagüez	50 km
Bronze medal – third place	2014 Veracruz	50 km
- Updated on 24 December 2014

Cristian David Berdeja Villavicencio (born June 21, 1981) is a Mexican male walker. He was Junior World Champion, Junior Panamerican Champion and Junior Central American Champion. PanAmerican Champion 50 km San Salvador 2009 and Medellín 2011 and 2024 World Champion in Gothenburg Sweden

== Personal bests ==
Event	Result	Venue	Date
Road walk
10 km	39:01 min	(Poland) Kraków	1 Jun 2002
20 km	1:19:22 hrs	(China) Cixi	23 Apr 2005
50 km	3:50:16 hrs A	(Chile) Arica	10 May 2015
Track walk
10,000 m	39:40.17 min A	(Mexico) Monterrey	4 Jul 2004
20,000 m	1:24:30.2 hrs (ht)	(Spain) Huelva	7 Aug 2004

== International competitions ==
Year	Competition	Venue	Position	Event	Notes
Representing Mexico
1999	Pan American Junior Championships	Tampa, United States	1st	10,000m track walk	44:30.65
2000	Pan American Race Walking Cup	Poza Rica, Mexico	3rd^{1}	20 km	1:23:46
2000	Central American and Caribbean Junior Championships (U20)	San Juan, Puerto Rico	1st	10,000m track walk	41:29.66
2000	World Junior Championships	Santiago, Chile	1st	10,000m track walk	40:56.47
2001	Universiade	Beijing, China	9th	20 km	1:26:59
2002	NACAC Under-25 Championships	San Antonio, United States	1st	20,000m walk	1:32:20
2002	World Race Walking Cup	Turin, Italy	–	20 km	-
2003	Pan American Race Walking Cup	Chula Vista, United States	2nd	20 km	1:24:17
2003	Pan American Race Walking Cup	Chula Vista, United States	3rd	Team (20 km)	23 pts
2003	Universiade	Daegu, South Korea	–	20 km	DQ
2004	Ibero-American Championships	Huelva, Spain	1st	20,000m track walk	1:24:30.2 (ht)
2005	World Championships	Helsinki, Finland	–	20 km	DQ
2005	Universiade	İzmir, Turkey	–	20 km	DQ
2006	World Race Walking Cup	A Coruña, Spain	–	20 km	DQ
2006	World Race Walking Cup	A Coruña, Spain	8th	Team (20 km)	94 pts
2007	Pan American Race Walking Cup	Balneário Camboriú, Brazil	4th	20 km	1:26:07
2007	Pan American Race Walking Cup	Balneário Camboriú, Brazil	2nd	Team (20 km)	23 pts
2007	Pan American Games	Rio de Janeiro, Brazil	–	20 km	DQ
2009	Pan American Race Walking Cup	San Salvador, El Salvador	1st	50 km	3:58:46
2010	World Race Walking Cup	Chihuahua, Mexico	7th	50 km	3:56:26
2010	World Race Walking Cup	Chihuahua, Mexico	2nd	Team (50 km)	22 pts
2010	Central American and Caribbean Games	Mayagüez, Puerto Rico	3rd	50 km	4:32:50
2011	Pan American Race Walking Cup	Envigado, Colombia	1st	50 km	3:59:14
2011	Pan American Race Walking Cup	Envigado, Colombia	2nd	Team (50 km)	15 pts
2012	World Race Walking Cup	Saransk, Russia	43rd	50 km	4:06:55
2012	World Race Walking Cup	Saransk, Russia	4th	Team (50 km)	49 pts
2013	Pan American Race Walking Cup	Guatemala City, Guatemala	5th	50 km	4:07:14 A
2013	Pan American Race Walking Cup	Guatemala City, Guatemala	1st	Team (50 km)	12 pts
2014	Central American and Caribbean Games	Xalapa, Mexico	3rd	50 km	3:53:39 A
2015	Pan American Race Walking Cup	Arica, Chile	2nd	50 km	3:50:16
2015	Pan American Race Walking Cup	Arica, Chile	1st	Team (50 km)	7 pts

^{1}: Competing out of competition.
