= Ann Peel =

Canadian racewalker

Personal information
- Born: February 27, 1961 (age 65) Ottawa, Ontario, Canada

Sport
- Country: Canada
- Sport: Athletics
- Event: Racewalking
Medal record
Representing Canada
World Indoor Championships
Bronze medal – third place	1985 Paris	3000m
Bronze medal – third place	1987 Indianapolis	3000m
Pan American Games
Silver medal – second place	1987 Indianapolis	10,000m
Summer Universiade
Bronze medal – third place	1987 Zagreb	5km walk

Ann A. Peel (born February 27, 1961) is a Canadian retired race walker. The first Executive Director of Right to Play, she founded Athletes CAN, a Canadian athletics network, in 1992.

== Personal bests ==
- 5000 m: 22:01.09 min, 17 July 1987, Zagreb
- 10 km: 45:06 min, 3 May 1987, New York City

== Achievements ==
Year	Competition	Venue	Position	Event	Notes
Representing Canada
1981	World Race Walking Cup	Valencia, Spain	8th	5 km	24:05.9
1983	World Race Walking Cup	Bergen, Norway	10th	10 km	47:02
1984	Pan American Race Walking Cup	Bucaramanga, Colombia	1st	10 km	49:41
1985	World Indoor Championships	Paris, France	3rd	3000 m	13:06.97
1985	World Race Walking Cup	St John's, Isle of Man	7th	10 km	48:31
1986	Pan American Race Walking Cup	Saint Léonard, Canada	2nd	10 km	45:26
1987	World Indoor Championships	Indianapolis, United States	3rd	3000 m	12:38.97
1987	Pan American Games	Indianapolis, United States	2nd	10,000 m	47:18.0
1987	World Race Walking Cup	New York City, United States	7th	10 km	45:06
1987	Universiade	Zagreb, Yugoslavia	3rd	5000 m	22:01.09
1987	World Championships	Rome, Italy	8th	10 km	45:27
1988	Pan American Race Walking Cup	Mar del Plata, Argentina	1st	10 km	46:23
1989	World Indoor Championships	Budapest, Hungary	7th	3000 m	12:32.34
1989	World Race Walking Cup	L'Hospitalet, Spain	17th	10 km	46:24
1990	Commonwealth Games	Auckland, New Zealand	—	10 km	DNF
