= Martín Bermúdez =

Mexican racewalker (born 1958)

Personal information
- Full name: Martín Bermúdez Mendoza
- Born: July 19, 1958 (age 67) El Carrizalillo, Turicato, Michoacán
- Height: 1.75 m (5 ft 9 in)
- Weight: 70 kg (154 lb)

Sport
- Country: Mexico
- Sport: Athletics
- Event: Racewalking
- Updated on 25 July 2013

Martín Bermúdez Mendoza (born July 19, 1958 in El Carrizalillo, Michoacán) is a retired male race walker from Mexico.

== Personal bests ==
- 20 km: 1:22:30 h, 11 October 1981, Zaragoza
- 50 km: 3:43:36 h, 30 September 1979, Eschborn

== International competitions ==
Year	Competition	Venue	Position	Event	Notes
Representing Mexico
1977	World Race Walking Cup	Milton Keynes, United Kingdom	12th	50 km	4:19:07
1979	Pan American Games	San Juan, Puerto Rico	2nd	50 km	4:11:13
1979	World Race Walking Cup	Eschborn, West Germany	1st	50 km	3:43:36 PB
1980	Olympic Games	Moscow, Soviet Union	—	50 km	DNF
1981	World Race Walking Cup	Valencia, Spain	6th	50 km	3:58:16
1983	Pan American Games	Caracas, Venezuela	2nd	50 km	4:04:20
1983	World Championships	Helsinki, Finland	—	50 km	DSQ
1983	World Race Walking Cup	Bergen, Norway	—	50 km	DNF
1984	Olympic Games	Los Angeles, United States	—	50 km	DSQ
1985	Central American and Caribbean Championships	Nassau, Bahamas	1st	50 km	4:22:33
1986	Pan American Race Walking Cup	Saint Léonard, Canada	1st	50 km	3:56:21
1986	Central American and Caribbean Games	Santiago, Dominican Republic	2nd	20 km	1:27:23
1986	Central American and Caribbean Games	Santiago, Dominican Republic	1st	50 km	4:04:47
1987	Pan American Games	Indianapolis, United States	1st	50 km	3:58:54
1987	World Race Walking Cup	New York City, United States	8th	50 km	3:51:49
1987	World Championships	Rome, Italy	5th	50 km	3:48.27
1988	Pan American Race Walking Cup	Mar del Plata, Argentina	1st	50 km	4:03:20
1988	Olympic Games	Seoul, South Korea	15th	50 km	3:49:22
1989	World Race Walking Cup	L'Hospitalet, Spain	4th	50 km	3:47:15
1989	Central American and Caribbean Championships	San Juan, Puerto Rico	1st	20 km	1:28:11 CR
1990	Pan American Race Walking Cup	Xalapa, Mexico	1st	50 km	3:51:30
1990	Central American and Caribbean Games	Mexico City, Mexico	–	50 km	DNF
1991	World Race Walking Cup	San Jose, United States	11th	50 km	3:58:33
1993	World Race Walking Cup	Monterrey, Mexico	11th	50 km	4:01:37
1995	World Race Walking Cup	Beijing, China	—	50 km	DSQ
