= María Guadalupe Sánchez (race walker, born 1977) =

Mexican racewalker

María Guadalupe Sánchez Gómez (born January 3, 1977, in Ciudad de México, Distrito Federal) is a female race walker from Mexico.

== Achievements ==
Year	Competition	Venue	Position	Event	Notes
Representing Mexico
1999	World Championships	Seville, Spain	25th	20 km	
2000	Pan American Race Walking Cup	Poza Rica, Mexico	1st	20 km	1:34:39
2000	Olympic Games	Sydney, Australia	5th	20 km	
2001	Pan American Race Walking Cup	Cuenca, Ecuador	1st	20 km	1:38:03
2001	World Championships	Edmonton, Canada	9th	20 km	
