= Janice McCaffrey =

Canadian race walker

Personal information
- Full name: Janice Leslie McCaffrey
- Born: Janice Turner; 20 October 1959 (age 66) Etobicoke, Ontario, Canada
- Height: 1.63 m (5 ft 4 in)
- Weight: 47 kg (104 lb)

Sport
- Country: Canada
- Sport: Athletics
- Event: Race walking
Medal record
Representing Canada
Commonwealth Games
Bronze medal – third place	1994 Victoria	10km walk
- Updated on 27 July 2013

Janice Leslie McCaffrey (née Turner, born 20 October 1959) is a Canadian retired race walker. She set her personal best in the women's 10 km race walk event (44:26) on 11 May 1995 in Eisenhüttenstadt.

== Personal bests ==
- 10 km: 44:26 min – Eisenhüttenstadt, Germany, 11 May 1996
- 20 km: 1:34:50 hrs – Victoria, Canada, 13 August 2000

== Achievements ==
Year	Competition	Venue	Position	Event	Notes
Representing Canada
1984	Pan American Race Walking Cup	Bucaramanga, Colombia	2nd	10 km	50:15 min
1985	World Race Walking Cup	St John's, Isle of Man	13th	10 km	48:10 min
1987	Pan American Games	Indianapolis, United States	–	10,000 m	DQ
1987	World Championships	Rome, Italy	14th	10 km	46:41 min
1988	Pan American Race Walking Cup	Mar del Plata, Argentina	4th	10 km	46:45 min
1989	World Race Walking Cup	L'Hospitalet de Llobregat, Spain	11th	10 km	45:37 min
1990	Commonwealth Games	Auckland, New Zealand	5th	10 km	48:26 min
1990	Pan American Race Walking Cup	Xalapa, Mexico	2nd	10 km	46:41 min
1991	World Championships	Tokyo, Japan	24th	10 km	46:33 min
1992	Olympic Games	Barcelona, Spain	25th	10 km	48:05 min
1993	World Championships	Stuttgart, Germany	27th	10 km	47:45 min
1994	Jeux de la Francophonie	Paris, France	1st	10,000 m	45:38.06 min
1994	Commonwealth Games	Victoria, Canada	3rd	10 km	44:54 min
1995	Pan American Games	Mar del Plata, Argentina	8th	10,000 m	53:27 min
1995	World Championships	Gothenburg, Sweden	30th	10 km	45:41 min
1996	Olympic Games	Atlanta, United States	25th	10 km	45:47 min
1998	Commonwealth Games	Kuala Lumpur, Malaysia	4th	10 km	46:36 min
1999	Pan American Games	Winnipeg, Canada	9th	20 km	1:47:05 hrs
2000	Olympic Games	Sydney, Australia	—	20 km	DSQ
