= María Colín =

Mexican race walker (born 1966)

Personal information
- Full name: María de la Luz Colín González
- Born: March 7, 1966 (age 60)

Sport
- Country: Mexico
- Sport: Athletics
- Event: Racewalking
- Updated on 25 July 2013

María de la Luz Colín González (born March 7, 1966) is a Mexican race walker.

== Personal bests ==
- 10 km: 45:33 min – Saint-Leonard, Canada, 3 October 1986

== Achievements ==
Year	Competition	Venue	Position	Event	Notes
Representing Mexico
1984	Pan American Race Walking Cup	Bucaramanga, Colombia	5th	10 km	51:23 min
1986	Central American and Caribbean Games	Santiago de los Caballeros, Dominican Republic	1st	10,000 m	50:43.62 min
1986	Pan American Race Walking Cup	Saint-Leonard, Canada	3rd	10 km	45:33 min
1987	Pan American Games	Indianapolis, United States	1st	10,000 m	47:17.15 min
1987	World Championships	Rome, Italy	17th	10 km	47:23 min
1988	Pan American Race Walking Cup	Mar del Plata, Argentina	2nd	10 km	46:33 min
1988	Ibero-American Championships	Mexico City, Mexico	1st	10,000 m	51:08.1 min A
1990	Pan American Race Walking Cup	Xalapa, Mexico	5th	10 km	48:11 min
1991	Central American and Caribbean Championships	Xalapa, Mexico	1st	10,000 m	49:15.94 min A
1991	World Championships	Tokyo, Japan	33rd	10 km	48:47 min
1993	World Championships	Stuttgart, Germany	28th	10 km	47:51 min
1993	Central American and Caribbean Games	Ponce, Puerto Rico	1st	10,000 m	47:57.20 min
1994	Ibero-American Championships	Mar del Plata, Argentina	4th	10,000 m	47:07.66 min
