= Michelle Rohl =

American racewalker (born 1965)

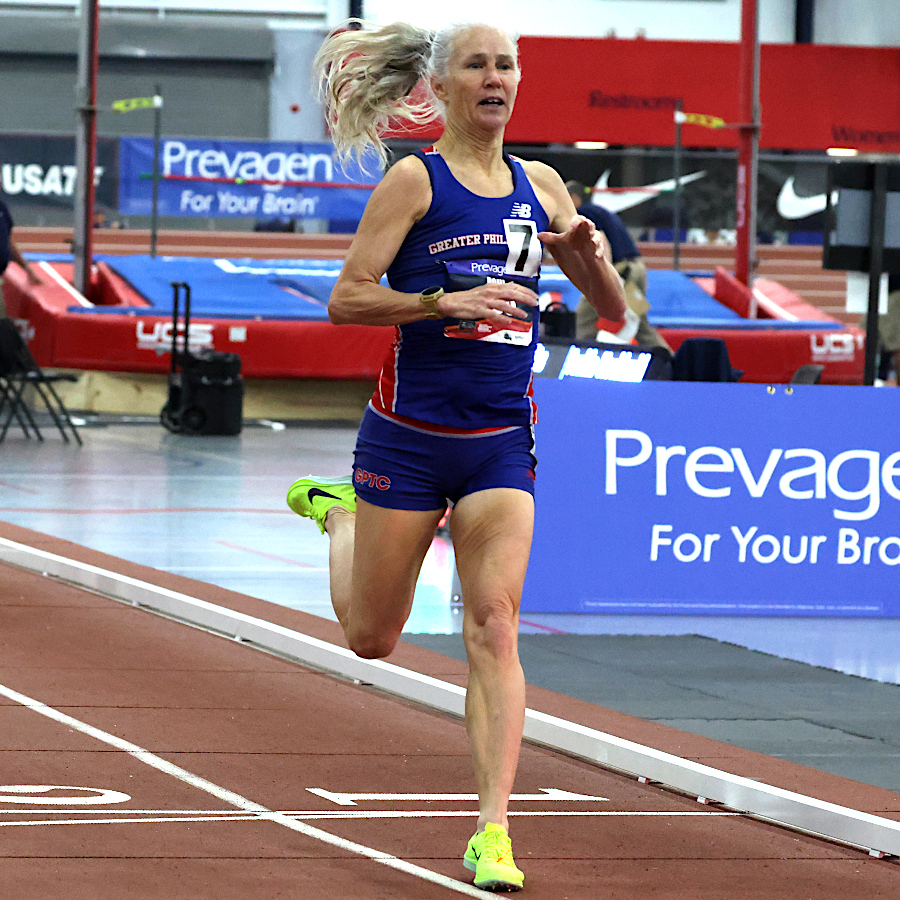
- Rohl in 2025

Personal information
- Born: November 12, 1965 (age 60) Madison, Wisconsin, U.S.
- Height: 4 ft 11 in (150 cm)
- Weight: 90 lb (41 kg)
Medal record
Women's athletics (track and field)
Representing the United States
Pan American Games
Silver medal – second place	1995 Mar del Plata	10km Walk
Bronze medal – third place	1999 Winnipeg	20km Walk

Michelle Rohl (born November 12, 1965, in Madison, Wisconsin) is an American racewalker. She represented her native country at three consecutive Summer Olympics in 1992–2000. A five-time USA Indoor Champion ('95, '96, '98, '00, and '01) and a four-time U.S. outdoor 20 km champion ('99–'01, and '03), she won a silver and a bronze medal at the Pan American Games (1995 and 1999).

Rohl holds three race walk American records; in the 10-km walk, 44:17 set on August 7, 1995, in Gothenburg, Sweden; the 20 kilometres race walk 1:31:51 set on May 13, 2000, in Kenosha, Wisconsin; and the 15 kilometres race walk 1:08:35 also set in Kenosha en route to the 20 km record.

Rohl won the Masters W50 mile race at USA Track & Field 2019 Masters Indoor Championships in Winston-Salem, N.C.

Rohl broke three American Records for W55 at the 2021 USATF Masters Outdoor Championships in Ames, Iowa: 800m (2:23.26), 1500m (4:54.16), and 4 × 400 m relay (4:23.52); the relay time was also a World Record. In 2022, she raced through the list of middle distances, improving on the 800 and 1500 while setting the 5000 and 10,000 American records, the 1500 and 5000 at the World Masters Athletics Championships. Her 4:47.63 1500 record was even superior to Sylvia Mosqueda's age 50 record that was never ratified. A 3000 record was disallowed because she didn't have an adequate number of competitors.

Rohl came out of retirement and competed in the 20 km race walking event at the 2024 USATF Olympic Trials, finishing in third place at age 58. She did not have the time standard to qualify for the Olympics.

In March 2026 Rohl ran a 5:24 mile at the NYRR championships, claimed to be a women's over-60 world record.
