= Julio César Urías =

Guatemalan race walker

Julio Urías
Personal information
- Full name: Julio César Urías Meda
- Born: 11 January 1972 (age 54)
- Height: 1.70 m (5 ft 7 in)
- Weight: 52 kg (115 lb)

Sport
- Country: Guatemala
- Sport: Men's Athletics
- Event: Race walking

Achievements and titles
- Olympic finals: Atlanta 96 17 place
Medal record
Men's athletics
Representing Guatemala
Pan American Games
Bronze medal – third place	1995 Mar del Plata	50 km
Central American and Caribbean Games
Bronze medal – third place	1993 Ponce	50 km
Central American Games
Gold medal – first place	1997 San Pedro Sula	35 km
Gold medal – first place	1994 San Salvador	50 km
- Updated on 30 August 2012

Julio César Urías Meda (born 11 January 1972) is a Guatemalan retired race walker. He won the bronze medal in the men's 50 km race walk event at the 1995 Pan American Games in Mar del Plata, Argentina, where he set his personal best - 3:49.37 on 24 March 1995.

== Personal bests ==
- 20 km: 1:23:58 hrs – Guatemala, 2 Septiembre 1994
- 50 km: 3:49:37 hrs – (Argentina) Mar del Plata, 24 March 1995

== Achievements ==
Year	Competition	Venue	Position	Event	Notes
Representing Guatemala
1990	Pan American Race Walking Cup	Xalapa, Mexico	12th	20 km	1:32:49
1991	Race Walking World Cup	San Jose, United States	51th	20 km	1:27:45
1993	Central American and Caribbean Games	Ponce, Puerto Rico	3rd	50 km	4:03:24
1993	World Championships	Stuttgart, Germany	—	50 km	DNF
1994	Central American Games	San Salvador, El Salvador	1st	50 km	4:08:21
1995	Pan American Games	Mar del Plata, Argentina	3rd	50 km	3:49:37 NR
1996	Olympic Games	Atlanta, United States	17th	50 km	3:56:27
1997	IAAF World Race Walking Cup	Poděbrady, Czech Republic	34th	50 km	4:00:12
1997	World Championships	Athens, Greece	23rd	50 km	4:07:18
1997	Central American Games	San Pedro Sula, Honduras	1st	35 km	2:55:34
1998	Sudamerican Race Walking Championship	Bogotá, Colombia	1st	35 km	2:46:12
2002	IAAF World Race Walking Cup	Turin, Italy	47th	20 km	1:31:42
