= Miguel Ángel Rodríguez (race walker) =

Mexican racewalker

Personal information
- Born: 5 January 1967 (age 59) Chihuahua City, Mexico

Sport
- Sport: Track and field
Medal record
Representing Mexico
World Athletics Championships
Bronze medal – third place	1997 Athens	50km
Pan American Games
Silver medal – second place	1991 Havana	50km
Silver medal – second place	1995 Mar del Plata	50km

Miguel Ángel Rodríguez Gallegos (born 5 or 15 January 1967) is a Mexican race walker.

== Achievements ==
Year	Competition	Venue	Position	Notes
Representing Mexico
1989	World Race Walking Cup	L'Hospitalet, Spain	17th	50 km
1991	Pan American Games	Havana, Cuba	2nd	50 km
1991	World Race Walking Cup	San Jose, United States	7th	50 km
1992	Olympic Games	Barcelona, Spain	8th	50 km
1993	World Race Walking Cup	Monterrey, Mexico	4th	50 km
1993	World Championships	Stuttgart, Germany	DSQ	50 km
1995	Pan American Games	Mar del Plata, Argentina	2nd	50 km
1995	World Race Walking Cup	Beijing, China	5th	50 km
1995	World Championships	Gothenburg, Sweden	4th	50 km
1996	Olympic Games	Atlanta, United States	DSQ	20 km
1997	World Championships	Athens, Greece	3rd	50 km
1999	World Championships	Seville, Spain	DNF	50 km
2000	Pan American Race Walking Cup	Poza Rica, Mexico	1st	50 km
2000	Olympic Games	Sydney, Australia	7th	50 km
2001	World Championships	Edmonton, Canada	24th	50 km
