= Alejandro López (race walker) =

Mexican race walker (born 1975)

Personal information
- Born: February 9, 1975 (age 51)

Sport
- Sport: Track and field
Medal record
Race walking
Representing Mexico
Summer Universiade
Gold medal – first place	1999 Palma de Mallorca	20km walk
Silver medal – second place	1997 Catania	20km walk
Pan American Games
Bronze medal – third place	2003 Santo Domingo	20km walk
Central American and Caribbean Games
Gold medal – first place	2002 San Salvador	20km walk
CAC Junior Championships (U20)
Gold medal – first place	1992 Tegucigalpa	10,000 m walk
Gold medal – first place	1994 Port of Spain	10,000 m walk

Alejandro López (born February 9, 1975) is a Mexican race walker.

== Achievements ==
Year	Competition	Venue	Position	Event	Notes
Representing Mexico
1992	Central American and Caribbean Junior Championships (U-20)	Tegucigalpa, Honduras	1st	10,000m	44:51.1
1992	World Junior Championships	Seoul, South Korea	—	10,000m	DQ
1994	Central American and Caribbean Junior Championships (U-20)	Port of Spain, Trinidad and Tobago	1st	10,000m	41:52.0
1994	World Junior Championships	Lisbon, Portugal	6th	10,000m	41:28.14
1995	World Race Walking Cup	Beijing, China	18th	20 km	1:23:32
1995	World Championships	Gothenburg, Sweden	—	20 km	DNF
1997	Universiade	Catania, Italy	2nd	20 km	1:26:00
1998	Ibero-American Championships	Lisbon, Portugal	1st	20 km	1:25:18
1999	Universiade	Palma de Mallorca, Spain	1st	20 km	1:25.12
1999	World Championships	Seville, Spain	12th	20 km	1:26:17
2001	Pan American Race Walking Cup	Cuenca, Ecuador	1st	20 km	1:25:25
2001	World Championships	Edmonton, Canada	11th	20 km	1:23:20
2001	Universiade	Beijing, China	8th	20 km	1:26:47
2002	World Race Walking Cup	Turin, Italy	2nd	20 km	1:22:01
2002	Central American and Caribbean Games	San Salvador, El Salvador	1st	20 km	1:26:32
2003	Pan American Games	Santo Domingo, Dominican Republic	3rd	20 km	1:24:33
2003	World Championships	Paris, France	10th	20 km	1:20:24
