= Curt Clausen =

American race walker

Personal information
- Born: October 9, 1967 (age 58) Trenton, New Jersey, U.S.
- Home town: Stevens Point, Wisconsin, U.S.
- Height: 1.88 m (6 ft 2 in)
- Weight: 71 kg (157 lb)

Sport
- Country: United States
- Sport: Athletics
- Event: Race walking
- Club: New York Athletic Club
Medal record
Men's athletics
Representing United States
World Championships
| Bronze medal – third place | 1999 Sevilla | 50 km walk |
- Updated on July 30, 2013

Curt Clausen (born October 9, 1967) is an American race walker. He placed 4th 50 km event in the 1999 IAAF World Championships in Athletics, but after 2 years was later awarded the 3rd place bronze medal, after the winner was stripped of his title for a doping violation.

As a prep, Clausen competed in distance running but also set the high school national record in the mile walk of 6:18.32. He attended Stevens Point Area Senior High School alongside Suzy Favor Hamilton, where he at times trained over 100 miles per week. Clausen committed to Duke University where he competed on the Duke Blue Devils track and field team despite racewalking not being an NCAA-sanctioned track and field event.

He was elected president of USATF in 2024.

== Personal bests ==
- 20 km: 1:23:34 hrs – Eugene, United States, June 27, 1999
- 50 km: 3:48:04 hrs – Mézidon-Canon, France, May 2, 1999

== Achievements ==
| Year | Competition | Venue | Position | Event | Notes |
Representing the United States
| 1986 | World Junior Championships | Athens, Greece | 28th | 10,000m | 47:00.40 min |
| 1990 | Pan American Race Walking Cup | Xalapa, Mexico | 8th | 50 km | 4:38:18 hrs |
| 1996 | Olympic Games | Atlanta, United States | 50th | 20 km | 1:31:30 hrs |
| 1997 | World Championships | Athens, Greece | 34th | 20 km | 1:32:05 hrs |
| 1999 | World Race Walking Cup | Mézidon-Canon, France | 11th | 50 km | 3:48:04 hrs PB |
| 1999 | Pan American Games | Winnipeg, Canada | 6th | 20 km | 1:23:39 hrs |
| 1999 | World Championships | Seville, Spain | 3rd | 50 km | 3:50:55 hrs |
| 2000 | Olympic Games | Sydney, Australia | 22nd | 50 km | 3:58:39 hrs |
| 2001 | World Championships | Edmonton, Canada | 7th | 50 km | 3:50.46 hrs |
| 2003 | World Championships | Paris, France | — | 50 km | DSQ |
| 2004 | Olympic Games | Athens, Greece | 32nd | 50 km | 4:11:31 hrs |
