= Joel Sánchez (race walker) =

Mexican race walker

Personal information
- Full name: Joel Sánchez Guerrero
- Born: 15 September 1966 (age 59) Mexico City, Mexico
- Height: 1.75 m (5 ft 9 in)
- Weight: 53 kg (117 lb)

Sport
- Country: Mexico
- Sport: Athletics
- Event: Race walking
Medal record
Representing Mexico
Olympic Games
Bronze medal – third place	2000 Sydney	50km walk
Pan American Games
Gold medal – first place	1999 Winnipeg	20km walk
Silver medal – second place	1991 Havana	20km walk
- Updated on 27 July 2013

Joel Sánchez Guerrero (born 15 September 1966) is a Mexican race walker, who made his debut at the 1988 Summer Olympics in Seoul, South Korea. There he was disqualified in the men's 20 km race. His greatest achievement was a bronze medal in the 50 kilometres walk at the 2000 Sydney Olympics. Among his other international performances, he was the gold medallist at the 1999 Pan American Games and a silver medallist at the 1991 Pan American Games.

== Personal bests ==
- 20 km: 1:19:00 hrs – Eisenhüttenstadt, Germany, 8 May 1999
- 50 km: 3:44:36 hrs – Sydney, Australia, 29 September 2000

== Achievements ==
Year	Competition	Venue	Position	Event	Notes
Representing Mexico
1984	Central American and Caribbean Junior Championships (U-20)	San Juan, Puerto Rico	2nd	10,000 m	48:07.0
1986	Pan American Race Walking Cup	Saint-Leonard, Canada	10th	20 km	1:25:50
1988	Olympic Games	Seoul, South Korea	—	20 km	DQ
1988	Pan American Race Walking Cup	Mar del Plata, Argentina	—	20 km	DQ
1990	Pan American Race Walking Cup	Xalapa, Mexico	2nd	20 km	1:22:09
1991	Pan American Games	Havana, Cuba	2nd	20 km	1:25:45
1991	World Race Walking Cup	San Jose, United States	12th	20 km	1:22:03
1991	World Championships	Tokyo, Japan	—	20 km	DNF
1992	Olympic Games	Barcelona, Spain	21st	20 km	1:30:12
1997	World Championships	Athens, Greece	16th	20 km	1:24:48
1999	Pan American Games	Winnipeg, Canada	1st	50 km	4:06:31
1999	World Championships	Seville, Spain	—	50 km	DNF
2000	Olympic Games	Sydney, Australia	3rd	50 km	3:44:36 PB
2001	World Championships	Edmonton, Canada	6th	20 km	1:22:05
