= Germán Sánchez (race walker) =

Mexican race walker

Personal information
- Full name: Germán Fortino Sánchez Cruz
- Born: July 31, 1967 (age 58) Zimatlán, Oaxaca, Mexico
- Height: 1.73 m (5 ft 8 in)
- Weight: 63 kg (139 lb)

Sport
- Sport: Athletics
- Event: Race walking
Medal record
Representing Mexico
Pan American Games
| Gold medal – first place | 2003 Santo Domingo | 50km walk |
Central American and Caribbean Games
| Silver medal – second place | 1993 Ponce | 50km walk |
- Updated on 30 July 2013

Germán Fortino Sánchez Cruz (born July 31, 1967) is a Mexican race walker.

== Personal bests ==
- 20 km: 1:25:05 hrs – A Coruña, Spain, 16 May 1998
- 50 km: 3:44:50 hrs – Cheboksary, Russia, 17 June 2001

== Achievements ==
| Year | Competition | Venue | Position | Event | Notes |
Representing Mexico
| 1990 | Pan American Race Walking Cup | Xalapa, Mexico | —^{*} | 50 km | 4:14:22 hrs |
| 1992 | Pan American Race Walking Cup | Guatemala City, Guatemala | 1st | 50 km | 4:06:21 hrs |
| 1992 | Olympic Games | Barcelona, Spain | — | 50 km | DSQ |
| 1993 | World Race Walking Cup | Monterrey, Mexico | 3rd | 50 km | 3:54:15 hrs |
| 1993 | Central American and Caribbean Games | Ponce, Puerto Rico | 2nd | 50 km | 3:56:18 hrs |
| 1995 | World Race Walking Cup | Beijing, China | 11th | 50 km | 3:49:29 hrs |
| 1995 | World Championships | Gothenburg, Sweden | — | 50 km | DNF |
| 1996 | Pan American Race Walking Cup | Manaus, Brazil | 1st | 50 km | 4:12:43 hrs |
| 1996 | Ibero American Championships | Medellín, Colombia | 2nd | 20 km | 1:26:30 |
| 1996 | Olympic Games | Atlanta, United States | 18th | 50 km | 3:57:47 |
| 1997 | World Championships | Athens, Greece | — | 50 km | DSQ |
| 2000 | Olympic Games | Sydney, Australia | — | 50 km | DSQ |
| 2003 | Pan American Race Walking Cup | Tijuana, Mexico | 1st | 50 km | 4:04:11 hrs |
| 2003 | Pan American Games | Santo Domingo, Dominican Republic | 1st | 50 km | 4:05:02 hrs |
| 2003 | World Championships | Paris, France | 12th | 50 km | 3:53:24 hrs |
| 2004 | Olympic Games | Athens, Greece | 17th | 50 km | 3:58:33 |

^{*}: Started as a guest out of competition.
