= Francisca Martínez =

Mexican race walker (born 1966)

Personal information
- Full name: Francisca Martínez Rodríguez
- Born: 4 October 1966 (age 59)
- Height: 1.57 m (5 ft 2 in)
- Weight: 52 kg (115 lb)

Sport
- Sport: Athletics
- Event: Race walking
Medal record
Representing Mexico
Pan American Games
Bronze medal – third place	1995 Mar del Plata	10km walk
- Updated on 27 July 2013

Francisca Martínez (born 4 October 1966) is a Mexican former race walker.

== Personal bests ==
- 10 km: 43:50 min – Eisenhüttenstadt, Germany, 14 May 1995
- 20 km: 1:37:19 hrs – Dublin, Ireland, 16 June 2001

== Achievements ==
Year	Competition	Venue	Position	Event	Notes
Representing Mexico
1988	Pan American Race Walking Cup	Mar del Plata, Argentina	—	10 km	DQ
1990	Pan American Race Walking Cup	Xalapa, Mexico	3rd	10 km	47:06 min
1991	Universiade	Sheffield, United Kingdom	12th	10 km	49:11 min
1992	Pan American Race Walking Cup	Guatemala City, Guatemala	1st	10 km	47:11 min
1992	Ibero-American Championships	Seville, Spain	1st	10,000 m	47:51.95 min
1994	Ibero-American Championships	Mar del Plata, Argentina	1st	10,000 m	47:01.80 min
1995	Pan American Games	Mar del Plata, Argentina	3rd	10,000 m	47:44.8 min
1995	Central American and Caribbean Championships	Guatemala City, Guatemala	1st	10 km	47:37 min A CR
1995	World Championships	Gothenburg, Sweden	31st	10 km	45:55 min
2002	Ibero-American Championships	Guatemala City, Guatemala	3rd	20,000 m	1:38:28 h
