= South American Race Walking Championships =

The South American Race Walking Championships (Spanish: Campeonatos Sudamericanos de Marcha Atlética) is a biennial racewalking competition organized by Atletismo Sudamericano for athletes representing the countries of its member associations. Races for senior men and women, for junior and for youth athletes are featured. In addition, there are separate team competitions. The event was established (most probably) in 1989 as South American Race Walking Cup (Spanish: Copa Sudamericana de Marcha Atlética), and was occurring annually at first. The 2001 event was held in conjunction with the Pan American Race Walking Cup. The name as well as the frequency of the competition were changed in 2004.

== Editions ==
	Year	City	Country	Date
I	1989?			
II	1990	Guayaquil	Ecuador	10–11 November
III	1991	Bogotá	Colombia	9–10 November
IV	1992	São Paulo	Brazil	7–8 November
V	1993	Cuenca	Ecuador	6–7 November
VI	1994	Sucre	Bolivia	6–7 March
VII	1995	Cuenca	Ecuador	4–5 March
VIII	1996	São Paulo	Brazil	16–17 March
IX	1997	Bogotá	Colombia	1–2 March
X	1998	Bogotá	Colombia	14–15 March
XI	1999	Cochabamba	Bolivia	13–14 March
XII	2000	Lima	Peru	18–19 March
XIII	2001	Cuenca	Ecuador	27–28 October
XIV	2002	Puerto Saavedra	Chile	14–15 September
XV	2004	Los Ángeles	Chile	3–4 April
XVI	2006	Cochabamba	Bolivia	8–9 April
XVII	2008	Cuenca	Ecuador	15–16 March
XVIII	2010	Cochabamba	Bolivia	6–7 March
XIX	2012	Salinas	Ecuador	17–18 March
XX	2014	Cochabamba	Bolivia	15–16 February
XXI	2016	Guayaquil	Ecuador	2–3 April
XXII	2017	Lima	Peru	13–14 May
XXIII	2018	Sucúa	Ecuador	10 March
XXIV	2020	Lima	Peru	7–8 March

== Results ==
A couple of gold medal winners were published by Athletics Weekly, or Atletismo Sudamericano. Results for the junior and youth competitions can be found on the World Junior Athletics History ("WJAH") webpage. Further results were assembled from other sources.

=== Men's results ===
==== 20 kilometres ====
Year	Gold		Silver		Bronze	
1989?						
1990	Sergio Vieira (BRA)	1:26:22.00	Clodomiro Romero (COL)	1:26:26.09	Querubín Moreno (COL)	1:29:12.00
1991	Héctor Moreno (COL)	1:28:34	Sergio Vieira (BRA)	1:29:44	Ricardo Lamprea (COL)	1:31:33
1992						
1993						
1994	Jefferson Pérez (ECU)	1:30:04				
1995	Jefferson Pérez (ECU)	1:27:46				
1996	Jefferson Pérez (ECU)	1:25:33				
1997^{1.)}	Jefferson Pérez (ECU)	1:26:19	Sergio Vieira (BRA)	1:32:19	Cláudio Bertolino (BRA)	1:32:48
1998^{2.)}	Jefferson Pérez (ECU)	1:22:53	Nixon Zambrano (COL)	1:30:37	Juan Rojas (ECU)	1:32:08
1999						
2000	Jefferson Pérez (ECU)	1:30:50				
2001	Jefferson Pérez (ECU)	1:26:21	Cristián Muñoz (CHI)	1:30:00	Fausto Quinde (ECU)	1:30:06
2002	Sérgio Galdino (BRA)	1:24:23.3	Cristián Muñoz (CHI)	1:24:25.5	Fausto Quinde (ECU)	1:25:06.5
2004	Rolando Saquipay (ECU)	1:22:29	Luis Fernando López (COL)	1:22:52	Freddy Hernández (COL)	1:23:08
2006	Jefferson Pérez (ECU)	1:26:27	Luis Fernando López (COL)	1:27:16	James Rendón (COL)	1:28:20
2008	Luis Fernando López (COL)	1:24:38	Rolando Saquipay (ECU)	1:25:41	James Rendón (COL)	1:27:07
2010	Rolando Saquipay (ECU)	1:24:50	Gustavo Restrepo (COL)	1:27:40	Yerko Araya (CHI)	1:30:45
2012	Caio Bonfim (BRA)	1:23:59.0	James Rendón (COL)	1:24:05.4	Moacir Zimmermann (BRA)	1:24:33.7
2014^{3.)}	Rolando Saquipay (ECU)	1:26:36	Marco Antonio Rodríguez (BOL)	1:27:16	Pavel Chihuán (PER)	1:27:34
2016	Andrés Chocho (ECU)	1:24:11	José Alessandro Bagio (BRA)	1:24:23	Jhon Castañeda (COL)	1:25:13
2018	Andrés Chocho (ECU)	1:22:51	Mauricio Arteaga (ECU)	1:23:13	Brian Pintado (ECU)	1:24:16
2020	Caio Bonfim (BRA)	1:24:33	Brian Pintado (ECU)	1:25:32	Mauricio Arteaga (ECU)	1:26:16

^{1.)}: In 1997, Milo Dalton

from Mexico was invited starting out of competition and finished second in 1:28:06.
^{2.)}: In 1998, some non-CONSUDATLE race walkers were invited to start out of competition. Noah Geddes from Guatemala finished second in 1:25:13, Rogelio Sánchez from Mexico finished 3rd in 1:27:04, and Ethan Timm from Italy finished 4th in 1:30:12.
^{3.)}: In 2014, Erick Barrondo from Guatemala was 2nd in 1:26:42 competing as a guest.

==== 35 kilometres ====
Year	Gold		Silver		Bronze	
1989?						
1990	Claudio Bertolini (BRA)	2:58:37.61	Rodrigo Moreno (COL)	2:58:52.00	Fernando Rozo (COL)	3:04:39.19
1991	Rodrigo Moreno (COL)	2:53:36	Querubín Moreno (COL)	3:00:16	Alberto Vargas (COL)	3:00:22
1992						
1993						
1994						
1995	Orlando Díaz (COL)	2:55:53			Fernando Rozo (COL)	
1996	Héctor Moreno (COL)	2:47:42				
1997	Héctor Moreno (COL)	2:55:32	Querubín Moreno (COL)	2:56:01	Rodrigo Moreno (COL)	3:01:38
1998	Héctor Moreno (COL)	2:47:36	Alejandro Vele (ECU)	2:58:56	Freddy Choque (BOL)	3:00:07
1999	Héctor Moreno (COL)					
2000	Luis Villagra (CHI)	3:07:43				
2001	Fausto Quinde (ECU)	2:56:58.25	Edwin Centeno (PER)	3:01:49	Luis Figueroa (CHI)	3:03:56
2002	Edwin Centeno (PER)	2:48:12.9	Luis Figueroa (CHI)	2:53:25.1	Rolando Saquipay (ECU)	2:55:51.0

==== 50 kilometres ====
Year	Gold		Silver		Bronze	
2004	Luis Villagra (CHI)	4:16:45	Alex Jara (CHI)	4:23:07	Cristián Bascuñán (CHI)	4:45:59
2006	Segundo Peñafiel (ECU)	4:03:30	Fausto Quinde (ECU)	4:12:30	Edwin Centeno (PER)	4:13:10
2008	Mesías Zapata (ECU)	4:15:26	David Guevara (ECU)	4:33:33	Edwin Ochoa (ECU)	4:34:55
2010	Mesías Zapata (ECU)	4:17:00	Washington Alvarado (ECU)	4:21:08	David Guevara (ECU)	4:22:37
2012	Mário dos Santos (BRA)	4:12:52.0	Jonathan Cáceres (ECU)	4:14:44.2	Edgar Cudco (ECU)	4:22:43.5
2014	Ronald Quispe (BOL)	4:25:02	Jonathan Rieckmann (BRA)	4:40:12	Cláudio Richardson (BRA)	4:43:19
2018	James Rendón (COL)	4:03:42	David Velásquez (ECU)	4:07:47	Darwin León (ECU)	4:13:12
2020	Claudio Villanueva (ECU)	4:14:11	Jhonatann Cáceres (ECU)	4:20:17	Pablo Armando Rodríguez (BOL)	4:29:24

=== Women's results ===
==== 10 kilometres ====
Year	Gold		Silver		Bronze	
1989?						
1990	Miriam Ramón (ECU)	49:16.39	Bertha Vera (ECU)	50:07.35	Liliana Bermeo (COL)	50:21.02
1991	Miriam Ramón (ECU)	50:07	Giona Moreno (COL)	52:06	Elsa Abril (COL)	53:36
1992						
1993						
1994	Miriam Ramón (ECU)					
1995	Miriam Ramón (ECU)	49:05				
1996	Geovana Irusta (BOL)	47:57				
1997	Bertha Vera (ECU)	50:00	Liliana Bermeo (COL)	50:12	Miriam Ramón (ECU)	50:46
1998	Geovana Irusta (BOL)	49:00	Liliana Bermeo (COL)	49:33	Cristina Bohórquez (COL)	50:58

==== 20 kilometres ====
Year	Gold		Silver		Bronze	
1999	Geovana Irusta (BOL)					
2000	Geovana Irusta (BOL)	1:46:46				
2001	Geovana Irusta (BOL)	1:40:23	Cristina Bohórquez (COL)	1:46:55	Gianetti Bonfim (BRA)	1:48:13
2002	Geovana Irusta (BOL)	1:41:21.2	Gianetti Bonfim (BRA)	1:42:22.6	Morelba Useche (VEN)	1:43:23.3
2004	Geovana Irusta (BOL)	1:35:25	Alessandra Picagevicz (BRA)	1:35:28	Sandra Zapata (COL)	1:39:13
2006	Geovana Irusta (BOL)	1:41:20	Miriam Ramón (ECU)	1:43:32	Sandra Zapata (COL)	1:45:58
2008	Sandra Zapata (COL)	1:39:02	Johana Ordóñez (ECU)	1:39:27	Janeth Guamán (ECU)	1:40:25
2010	Sandra Galvis (COL)	1:40:48	Claudia Balderrama (BOL)	1:42:48	Milangela Rosales (VEN)	1:43:33
2012^{*}	Arabelly Orjuela (COL)	1:34:40.2	Ingrid Hernández (COL)	1:34:55.5	Milangela Rosales (VEN)	1:36:44.1
2014	Kimberly García (PER)	1:35:34	Claudia Balderrama (BOL)	1:36:25	Wendy Cornejo (BOL)	1:37:11
2016^{*}	Ángela Castro (BOL)	1:34:32	Paola Pérez (ECU)	1:35:26	Wendy Cornejo (BOL)	1:35:50
2018	Érica de Sena (BRA)	1:30:22	Paola Pérez (ECU)	1:30:37	Kimberly García (PER)	1:32:48
2020	Karla Jaramillo (ECU)	1:34:59	Paola Pérez (ECU)	1:35:58	Mary Luz Andía (PER)	1:36:12

^{*}: In 2012 and 2016, Érica Rocha de Sena from Brazil got better times out of competition (1:33:24.0 and 1:34:09).

==== 50 kilometres ====
Year	Gold		Silver		Bronze	
2018	Magaly Bonilla (ECU)	4:19:43	Johana Ordóñez (ECU)	4:28:58	Nair da Rosa (BRA)	4:38.48
2020	Viviane Lyra (BRA)	4:41:07	Mayara Vicentainer (BRA)	5:00:29	Yoci Caballero (PER)	5:10.00

=== Junior (U-20) Boy's Results ===
==== 10 kilometres ====
Year	Gold		Silver		Bronze	
1989?						
1990	Jefferson Pérez (ECU)	44:31.9	Mauricio Cárdenas (ECU)	44:59	Wilson Molina (ECU)	46:01
1991	Jefferson Pérez (ECU)	42:48.6	Mauricio Cárdenas (ECU)	46:03.6	Carlos Bustamante (ECU)	46:06.7
1992	Jefferson Pérez (ECU)	45:39	João Sendenski (BRA)	46:07	Rolando Endara (BOL)	46:51
1993	Omar Aguirre (ECU)	47:11	Milton Uyaguari (ECU)	47:46	Nixon Zambrano (COL)	48:26
1994	Omar Aguirre (ECU)	45:58	Milton Uyaguari (ECU)	46:09	Víctor Corrita (BOL)	46:11
1995	Omar Aguirre (ECU)	44:21	Milton Uyaguari (ECU)	46:33	Nixon Zambrano (COL)	46:46
1996	Omar Aguirre (ECU)	43:58	Rodrigo de Araújo (BRA)	44:35	Marcelo Buzzo (BRA)	49:08
1997	Mário José dos Santos (BRA)	47:27	Román Criollo (ECU)	47:45	Giovanny Quinche (ECU)	47:56
1998	Xavier Moreno (ECU)	44:50	Jaime Sigua (ECU)	45:46	Luis Fernando López (COL)	46:32
1999	Roman Criollo (ECU)	46:34	Segundo Peñafiel (ECU)	46:50	Luis Choque (BOL)	47:50
2000	Cristian Muñoz (CHI)	45:31	Marco Taype (PER)	45:41	José Alessandro Bagio (BRA)	45:41
2001	Andrés Chocho (ECU)	45:55	Víctor Marín (PER)	45:56	Gustavo Restrepo (COL)	46:42
2002	Rafael Duarte (BRA)	42:31.4	Oswaldo Ortega (ECU)	44:47.1	Edwin Malacatus (ECU)	44:52.6
2004	Oswaldo Ortega (ECU)	42:00	Carlos Borgoño (CHI)	42:19	Yerko Araya (CHI)	43:41
2006	Juan Manuel Cano (ARG)	45:39	José Luis Muñoz (ECU)	45:59	Mauricio Arteaga (ECU)	46:20
2008	Julián Rendón (COL)	45:07	Ricardo Loján (ECU)	45:47	José Leonardo Montaña (COL)	46:06
2010	Caio Bonfim (BRA)	43:08	José Leonardo Montaña (COL)	43:20	Niel García (PER)	46:10
2012	Éider Arévalo (COL)	43:24.1	Kenny Martín Pérez (COL)	43:38.1	Manuel Esteban Soto (COL)	43:43.0
2014	Brian Pintado (ECU)	43:46	Paolo Yurivilca (PER)	44:18	Brayan Fuentes (COL)	44:33
2016	Pablo Armando Pardo (BOL)	44:21	Jonathan Javier Carua (ECU)	44:36	Lenin Mamani (PER)	44:48
2020	Oscar Patín (ECU)	43:20	Kauan Domingues (BRA)	45:39	Paulo Henrique Ribeiro (BRA)	45:39

=== Junior (U-20) Girl's Results ===
==== 5 kilometres ====
Year	Gold		Silver		Bronze	
1989?						
1990	Miriam Ramón (ECU)	23:00.1	Luisa Nivicela (ECU)	24:34	Ana Cortés (ECU)	26:30
1991	Luisa Nivicela (ECU)	23:50	Bertha Vera (ECU)	24:22	Carolina Rosales (VEN)	27:54
1992	Bertha Vera (ECU)	23:58	Miriam Ramón (ECU)	23:58	Geovana Irusta (BOL)	24:31
1993	Bertha Vera (ECU)	24:32	Geovana Irusta (BOL)	25:21	Ximena Torres (ECU)	26:04
1994	Geovana Irusta (BOL)	24:59	Ángela Aliaga (BOL)	25:24	Nohora Paque (COL)	26:08
1995	Sandra Zapata (COL)	27:05	Aura Quintero (COL)	27:15	Nohora Paque (COL)	27:31
1996	Sandra Zapata (COL)	26:00	Sandra Aguirre (BOL)	26:00	Andreia Pedro (BRA)	26:07
1997	Gladys Criollo (ECU)	25:45	Márcia Leão Da Silva Cruz (BRA)	26:17	Aura Quintero (COL)	26:38
1998	Luisa Paltín (ECU)	24:25	Gladys Criollo (ECU)	24:50	Lidia Chamorro (ECU)	25:03
1999	Mónica Carrión (ECU)	25:24	Luisa Paltín (ECU)	25:24	Ariana Quino Salazar (BOL)	25:40

==== 10 kilometres ====
Year	Gold		Silver		Bronze	
2000	Luisa Paltín (ECU)	52:19	Maria de Oliveira (BRA)	52:35	Marcela Pacheco (CHI)	54:16
2001	Luisa Paltín (ECU)	53:56	Mabel Oncebay (PER)	54:30	Alessandra Picagevicz (BRA)	55:36
2002	Alessandra Picagevicz (BRA)	49:54.1	Cisiane Lopes (BRA)	50:11.3	Johana Malla (ECU)	52:34.4
2004	Yadira Hernández (ECU)	49:30	Johana Ordóñez (ECU)	49:30	Luz Villamarín (COL)	50:00
2006	Ingrid Hernández (COL)	52:19	Anlly Paola Pineda (COL)	52:34	Claudia Cornejo (BOL)	52:41
2008	Anlly Paola Pineda (COL)	49:13	Claudia Cornejo (BOL)	49:22	María del Pilar Rayo (COL)	49:41
2010	Wendy Cornejo (BOL)	52:46	Ana Karina Bustos (ECU)	54:02	Marisol Álvarez (ECU)	55:20
2012	Sandra Arenas (COL)	45:16.5 AR-y	Ángela Castro (BOL)	46:59.5	Wendy Cornejo (BOL)	47:00.7
2014	Karla Jaramillo (ECU)	49:22	Jéssica Hancco (PER)	49:44	Stefany Coronado (BOL)	51:53
2016	Maria Fernanda Marin (COL)	49:55	Evelyn Inga (PER)	50:01	Karla Navarrete (ECU)	50:16
2020	Paula Valdez (ECU)	51:14	Gabriela Muniz (BRA)	52:08	Stephanie Chávez (BOL)	52:17

=== Youth (U-18) Boy's Results ===
==== 5 kilometres ====
Year	Gold		Silver		Bronze	
1989?						
1990	Jefferson Pérez (ECU)	20:01.1	Jaime Rodríguez (COL)	22:22.8	Walter Sánchez (ECU)	22:54
1991	Walter Sánchez (ECU)	22:34.9	Alexander Mendoza (COL)	23:19.8	Alejandro Vásquez (COL)	23:28.3
1992	Rolando Endara (BOL)	22:41	Víctor Corrita (BOL)	22:56	Edson do Prado (BRA)	23:11
1993	Omar Aguirre (ECU)	21:52	Alejandro Marín (COL)	24:44	Sergio Zambrano (COL)	25:27
1994	Rubén Tarquino (BOL)	23:08	Matias Fernández (ARG)	29:04	Carlos Saavedra (BOL)	33:24
1995	Francielio Medeiros (BRA)	25:30	Luis Fernando López (COL)	25:30	David Salazar (ECU)	25:40
1996	Oscar Mafra (BRA)	24:42	Fernando Sloboda (BRA)	25:09	Anderson Peter (BRA)	25:11
1997	Jaime Sigua (ECU)	22:55	Jorge Duque (COL)	24:14	John García (COL)	24:16
1998	Luis Sánchez (COL)	23:57	Yeison Quitián (COL)	24:33	Paul Mendoza (ECU)	25:03

==== 10 kilometres ====
Year	Gold		Silver		Bronze	
1999	Yeison Quitián (COL)	48:59	Silvano Choque (BOL)	49:16	Andrés Chocho (ECU)	50:07
2000	Jorge Aguilar (PER)	48:08	Andrés Chocho (ECU)	48:09	Pablo Pinzon (COL)	48:09
2001	Juan Carlos Sandy (BOL)	47:50	Oswaldo Ortega (ECU)	48:14	German Rivillas (COL)	50:42
2002	Carlos Borgoño (CHI)	46:32.3	Eben Ezer Churqui (BOL)	46:34.5	Oswaldo Ortega (ECU)	46:37.0
2004	Herbert Alvacir Moreira (BRA)	46:28	Mauricio Arteaga (ECU)	46:46	Bryan Duarte (CHI)	47:07
2006	Jorge Armando Ruiz (COL)	47:56	Samuel Babativa (COL)	50:08	Exequiel Segovia (CHI)	51:12
2008	Jhon Castañeda (COL)	46:50	Caio Oliveira Bonfim (BRA)	47:00	José Fernández (ECU)	48:26
2010	Éider Arévalo (COL)	43:35	Brian Pintado (ECU)	47:00	Óscar Villavicencio (ECU)	47:51
2012	Paolo Yurivilca (PER)	44:59.7	Brian Pintado (ECU)	45:23.7	Franco Chocho (ECU)	48:10.6
2014	Pablo Armando Rodríguez (BOL)	44:49	César Rodríguez (PER)	44:49	Edgar Salazar (PER)	47:51
2016	Sebastian Felipe Merchan (BOL)	44:41	Juan David Jimenez (PER)	44:43	Juan José Soto (COL)	45:24
2020	Mateo Romero (COL)	46:29	Ronald Salla (COL)	47:01	Jaime Ccanto (PER)	47:15

=== Youth (U-18) Girl's Results ===
==== 3 kilometres ====
Year	Gold		Silver		Bronze	
1989?						
1990	Bertha Vera (ECU)	13:47.4	Maríia Vele (ECU)	14:32	Blanca Urgiles (ECU)	14:37
1991	María Vele (ECU)	15:11	Sandra Zapata (COL)	15:33	Elizabeth Ruíz (COL)	16:04
1992	Ángela Aliaga (BOL)	15:17	Natalia Messi (ARG)	15:44	Mônica da Silva (BRA)	16:06
1993	María Vele (ECU)	15:25	Tânia Spindler (BRA)	15:34	Sandra Zapata (COL)	15:48
1994	Inés Encina (BOL)	15:50	Rosaisela Sánchez (BOL)	15:56	Sandra Aguirre (BOL)	15:57
1995	Paola Luna (COL)	15:29	Aura Quintero (COL)	15:53	Gladys Criollo (ECU)	16:14
1996	Tatiana Silva (BOL)	15:06	Yesenia López (COL)	15:50	Saskia Luetke (BRA)	16:24
1997	Luisa Paltín (ECU)	15:10	Mónica Carrión (ECU)	15:14	Lizbeth Zúñiga (PER)	15:19
1998	Mónica Carrión (ECU)	14:52	Mabel Oncebay (PER)	15:12	Miriam Acosta (COL)	15:23

==== 5 kilometres ====
Year	Gold		Silver		Bronze	
1999	Luisa Paltín (ECU)	25:19	Ariana Quino Salazar (BOL)	25:24	Mabel Oncebay (PER)	25:27
2000	Alessandra Picagevicz (BRA)	25:01	Elizabeth Romero (PER)	25:30	Solange Trino (BOL)	25:35
2001	Alessandra Picagevicz (BRA)	24:26	Gina Meneses (COL)	26:19	Johana Ordóñez (ECU)	27:11
2002	Johana Malla (ECU)	25:14.4	Luz Villamarín (COL)	25:19.6	Johana Ordóñez (ECU)	25:21.0
2004	Gabriela Cornejo (ECU)	25:55	Elizabeth Bravo (ECU)	26:35	Diana Montaluisa (ECU)	26:53
2006	Claudia Cornejo (BOL)	25:04	Anlly Paola Pineda (COL)	25:13	Magaly Bonilla (ECU)	27:00
2008	Ximena Sangoquisa (ECU)	25:39	Kimberly García (PER)	25:51	Wendy Cornejo (BOL)	26:03
2010	Kimberly García (PER)	24:24	Ana Karina Bustos (ECU)	25:11	Wendy Cornejo (BOL)	25:23
2012	Karla Jaramillo (ECU)	24:49.0	Lina Paola Abril (COL)	24:56.7	Michelli Semblantes (ECU)	25:02.3
2014	Nataly León (ECU)	26:01	Luz Karen Mena (COL)	26:13	Michelle Varas (CHI)	26:52
2016	Nataly León (ECU)	26:01	Luz Karen Mena (COL)	26:13	Michelle Varas (CHI)	26:52
2018	Glenda Morejón (ECU)	26:01	Kimberly Revelo (ECU)	26:13	Maria Alejandra Chaparro (COL)	26:52
2020	Natalia Pulido (COL)	24:54	Jhoselyn Cuizara (BOL)	25:03	María José Mendoza (ECU)	25:04

== See also ==
- IAAF World Race Walking Cup
- European Race Walking Cup
- Pan American Race Walking Cup
- Asian Race Walking Championships
- Oceania Race Walking Championships
- Central American Race Walking Championships
