= 2006 South American Race Walking Championships =

- Organisers: CONSUDATLE
- Edition: 16th
- Date: April 8–9
- Host city: Cochabamba, Cochabamba Department, Bolivia
- Venue: Paseo El Prado
- Events: 7
- Participation: 93 athletes from 9 nations

The 2006 South American Race Walking Championships were held in Cochabamba, Bolivia, on April 8–9, 2006. The track of the championship runs in the Paseo El Prado (Avenida Ballivián). A detailed report on the event and an appraisal of the results was given by Eduardo Biscayart for the World Athletics.

Complete results were published. The junior events are documented on the World Junior Athletics History webpages.

== Medallists ==
Event	Gold		Silver		Bronze	
Men
20 km	Jefferson Pérez (ECU)	1:26:27	Luis Fernando López (COL)	1:27:16	James Rendón (COL)	1:28:20
50 km	Segundo Peñafiel (ECU)	4:03:30	Fausto Quinde (ECU)	4:12:30	Edwin Centeno (PER)	4:13:10
10 km Junior (U20)	Juan Manuel Cano (ARG)	45:39	José Luis Muñoz (ECU)	45:59	Mauricio Arteaga (ECU)	46:20
10 km Youth (U18)	Jorge Armando Ruiz (COL)	46:57	Samuel Babativa (COL)	50:09	Exequiel Segovia (CHI)	51:13
Team (Men)
20 km Team	Colombia	9 pts	Ecuador	12 pts	Bolivia	35 pts
50 km Team	Ecuador	7 pts	Peru	18 pts		
10 km Junior (U20) Team	Ecuador	9 pts	Colombia	18 pts		
10 km Youth (U18) Team	No team finished					
Women
20 km	Geovana Irusta (BOL)	1:41:20	Miriam Ramón (ECU)	1:43:32	Sandra Zapata (ECU)	1:45:58
10 km Junior (U20)	Ingrid Hernández (COL)	52:19	Anlly Pineda (COL)	52:34	Claudia Cornejo (BOL)	52:41
5 km Youth (U18)	Claudia Cornejo (BOL)	25:04	Anlly Pineda (COL)	25:13	Magaly Bonilla (ECU)	27:00
Team (Women)
20 km Team	Ecuador	16 pts	Brazil	19 pts	Bolivia	22 pts
10 km Junior (U20) Team	Colombia	7 pts	Ecuador	20 pts	Brazil	30 pts
5 km Youth (U18) Team	Bolivia	13 pts				

== Results ==
=== Men's 20km ===
Place	Athlete	Time
1st place, gold medalist(s)	Jefferson Pérez ECU	1:26:27
2nd place, silver medalist(s)	Luis Fernando López COL	1:27:16
3rd place, bronze medalist(s)	James Rendón COL	1:28:20
4	Fredy Hernández COL	1:28:31
5	Xavier Moreno ECU	1:29:31
6	Andrés Chocho ECU	1:30:24
7	Mário José dos Santos BRA	1:30:51
8	Patricio Ortega ECU	1:32:57
9	Sidinei Rodrigues BRA	1:36:26
10	Franklin Aduviri BOL	1:36:47
11	Cristian Muñoz CHI	1:37:30
12	Eben Ezer Churqui BOL	1:37:32
13	Juan Carlos Sandy BOL	1:39:38
14	Luis Villagra CHI	1:41:35
—	Yerko Araya CHI	DQ/DNF
—	Fillol Bayona VEN	DQ/DNF
—	Carlos Borgoño CHI	DQ/DNF
—	Elías Reynaga BOL	DQ/DNF
—	Ronald Huayta BOL	DQ/DNF
—	Wilden Patty BOL	DQ/DNF
—	Rolando Saquipay ECU	DQ/DNF
—	Moacir Zimmermann BRA	DQ/DNF

==== Team 20km Men ====
Place	Country	Points
1st place, gold medalist(s)	Colombia	9 pts
2nd place, silver medalist(s)	Ecuador	12 pts
3rd place, bronze medalist(s)	Bolivia	35 pts

=== Men's 50km ===
Place	Athlete	Time
1st place, gold medalist(s)	Segundo Peñafiel ECU	4:03:30
2nd place, silver medalist(s)	Fausto Quinde ECU	4:12:30
3rd place, bronze medalist(s)	Edwin Centeno PER	4:13:10
4	Mesías Zapata ECU	4:21:10
5	Julián Choque BOL	4:29:40
6	Hugo Aros CHI	4:39:30
7	Víctor Marín PER	4:46:10
8	Iván Núñez PER	5:01:10
—	Miguel Ángel Gonzales BOL	DQ
—	Javier Arpazi BOL	DQ
—	David Guevara ECU	DQ
—	Cláudio Richardson dos Santos BRA	DQ

==== Team 50km Men ====
Place	Country	Points
1st place, gold medalist(s)	Ecuador	7 pts
2nd place, silver medalist(s)	Peru	18 pts

=== Men's 10km Junior (U20) ===
Place	Athlete	Time
1st place, gold medalist(s)	Juan Manuel Cano ARG	45:39
2nd place, silver medalist(s)	José Luis Muñoz ECU	45:59
3rd place, bronze medalist(s)	Mauricio Arteaga ECU	46:20
4	Robinson Vivar ECU	47:28
5	Jorge Armando Ruiz COL	48:41
6	Oscar Díaz COL	49:19
7	Samuel Babativa COL	49:44
8	Uriel Yucra PER	49:58
9	Thiago Bremer BRA	50:18
10	Camilo Acuña CHI	50:39
11	Jonathan Riekmann BRA	53:17
12	José Luis Arpazi BOL	53:37
13	Ronald Quispe BOL	54:48
—	Edwin Ochoa ECU	DQ
—	Duberty Flores BOL	DQ
—	Herbert de Almeida BRA	DQ
—	Yassir Cabrera PAN	DNF

==== Team 10km Men Junior (U20) ====
Place	Country	Points
1st place, gold medalist(s)	Ecuador	9 pts
2nd place, silver medalist(s)	Colombia	18 pts

=== Men's 10km Youth (U18) ===
Place	Athlete	Time
1st place, gold medalist(s)	Jorge Armando Ruiz COL	46:57
2nd place, silver medalist(s)	Samuel Babativa COL	50:09
3rd place, bronze medalist(s)	Exequiel Segovia CHI	51:13
4	Pedro Augusto Severo BRA	53:24
5	Oscar Romero PER	54:10
6	Luis Urgiles ECU	54:38
7	Damian Campaña ECU	55:15
8	Ronald Quispe BOL	55:55
—	Washington Alvarado ECU	DQ
—	Oscar Díaz COL	DQ
—	Gonzalo Aguilar BOL	DQ

=== Women's 20km ===
Place	Athlete	Time
1st place, gold medalist(s)	Geovana Irusta BOL	1:41:20
2nd place, silver medalist(s)	Miriam Ramón ECU	1:43:32
3rd place, bronze medalist(s)	Sandra Zapata COL	1:45:58
4	Yadira Guamán ECU	1:46:23
5	Alessandra Picagevicz BRA	1:48:45
6	Tânia Spindler BRA	1:49:48
7	Janeth Mamani BOL	1:49:55
8	Cisiane Dutra Lopes BRA	1:50:17
9	Marcela Pacheco CHI	1:51:24
10	Magaly Andrade ECU	1:54:50
11	Carolina Flores VEN	2:01:54
12	Nataly Raio CHI	2:02:54
13	Josette Sepúlveda CHI	2:05:35
14	Eblín Alemán BOL	2:12:06
15	Érika Flores BOL	2:14:26
—	Claudia Balderrama BOL	DQ/DNF
—	Eunice Chávez BOL	DQ/DNF

==== Team 20km Women ====
Place	Country	Points
1st place, gold medalist(s)	Ecuador	16 pts
2nd place, silver medalist(s)	Brazil	19 pts
3rd place, bronze medalist(s)	Bolivia	22 pts
4	Chile	34 pts

=== Women's 10km Junior (U20) ===
Place	Athlete	Time
1st place, gold medalist(s)	Ingrid Hernández COL	52:19
2nd place, silver medalist(s)	Anlly Pineda COL	52:34
3rd place, bronze medalist(s)	Claudia Cornejo BOL	52:41
4	Maria Rayo COL	54:33
5	Johana Ordóñez ECU	54:53
6	Gabriela Cornejo ECU	55:04
7	Fariluz Morales PER	56:28
8	Milángela Rosales VEN	56:41
9	Maritza Guamán ECU	57:29
10	Vanessa Contreras CHI	57:58
11	Aline Sausen BRA	58:33
12	Marilu Zanghelini BRA	59:02
13	Ingrid Acuña CHI	59:33
14	Abigail Churqui BOL	59:36
15	Diana Montaluisa ECU	59:42
16	Cirila Cume ECU	59:58
17	Jéssica de Souza BRA	1:03:59
—	Emma Quinallata BOL	DQ
—	Ana María Almonacid COL	DQ
—	Paola Sánchez ECU	DQ
—	Daniela Padilla BOL	DQ
—	Bárbara Acuña CHI	DQ

==== Team 10km Women Junior (U20) ====
Place	Country	Points
1st place, gold medalist(s)	Colombia	7 pts
2nd place, silver medalist(s)	Ecuador	20 pts
3rd place, bronze medalist(s)	Brazil	30 pts

=== Women's 5km Youth (U18) ===
Place	Athlete	Time
1st place, gold medalist(s)	Claudia Cornejo BOL	25:04
2nd place, silver medalist(s)	Anlly Pineda COL	25:13
3rd place, bronze medalist(s)	Magaly Bonilla ECU	27:00
4	Victoria Alarcón CHI	27:13
5	Abigail Churqui BOL	27:45
6	Paola Pérez ECU	28:23
7	Catherine Pérez BOL	29:58
—	Alessandra Dolberth BRA	DQ
—	Ana María Almonacid COL	DQ
—	Maria Rayo COL	DQ
—	Kimberly García PER	DQ
—	Daniela Padilla BOL	DQ
—	Ximena Machaca BOL	DQ

==== Team 5km Women Youth (U18) ====
Place	Country	Points
1st place, gold medalist(s)	Bolivia	13 pts

== Participation ==
The participation of 89 athletes from 9 countries was announced. Another source reports 93 athletes. An unofficial count yields 107 athletes.

- Argentina (1)
- Bolivia (29)
- Brazil (16)
- Chile (15)
- Colombia (17)
- Ecuador (27)
- (Panama) Panamá (1)
- (Peru) Perú (8)
- Venezuela (3)

== See also ==
- 2006 Race Walking Year Ranking
