= 2012 South American Race Walking Championships =

- Organisers: Atletismo Sudamericano
- Edition: 19th
- Date: March 17–18
- Host city: Salinas, Santa Elena, Ecuador
- Venue: El Malecón de Salinas
- Events: 7
- Participation: 87 athletes from 8 nations

The 2012 South American Race Walking Championships were held in Salinas, Ecuador, on March 17–18, 2012. The track of the championship runs in El Malecón de Salinas.

A detailed report on the event and an appraisal of the results was given by Eduardo Biscayart for the World Athletics.

Complete results were published. The junior events are documented on the World Junior Athletics History webpages.

== Medallists ==
Event	Gold		Silver		Bronze	
Men
20 km	Caio Bonfim (BRA)	1:23:59	James Rendón (COL)	1:24:05	Moacir Zimmermann (BRA)	1:24:34
50 km	Mário dos Santos (BRA)	4:12:52	Jonathan Cáceres (ECU)	4:14:44	Edgar Cudco (ECU)	4:22:44
10 km Junior (U20)	Éider Arévalo (COL)	43:24	Kenny Martín Pérez (COL)	43:38	Manuel Esteban Soto (COL)	43:43
10 km Youth (U18)	Paolo Yurivilca (PER)	44:60	Brian Pintado (ECU)	45:24	Franco Chocho (ECU)	48:11
Team (Men)
20 km Team	Brazil	15 pts	Ecuador	18 pts		
50 km Team	Ecuador	10 pts				
10 km Junior (U20) Team	Colombia	3 pts	Brazil	17 pts	Ecuador	17 pts
10 km Youth (U18) Team	Ecuador	5 pts	Colombia	11 pts		
Women
20 km	Arabelly Orjuela (COL)	1:34:40	Ingrid Hernández (COL)	1:34:56	Milangela Rosales (VEN)	1:36:44
10 km Junior (U20)	Sandra Arenas (COL)	45:17	Ángela Castro (BOL)	46:60	Wendy Cornejo (BOL)	47:01
5 km Youth (U18)	Karla Jaramillo (ECU)	24:49	Lina Abril (COL)	24:57	Wendy Díaz (COL)	26:18
Team (Women)
20 km Team	Colombia	9 pts	Ecuador	20 pts		
10 km Junior (U20) Team	Bolivia	5 pts	Colombia	6 pts	Brazil	15 pts
5 km Youth (U18) Team	Colombia	5 pts				

== Results ==
=== Men's 20km ===
Place	Athlete	Time
1st place, gold medalist(s)	Caio Bonfim BRA	1:23:59.0
2nd place, silver medalist(s)	James Rendón COL	1:24:05.4
3rd place, bronze medalist(s)	Moacir Zimmermann BRA	1:24:33.7
4	Rolando Saquipay ECU	1:25:56.2
5	José Leonardo Montaña COL	1:27:45.6
6	Mauricio Arteaga ECU	1:28:27.6
7	Ronald Quispe BOL	1:29:16.0
8	Andrés Chocho ECU	1:30:24.4
9	José Bustamante VEN	1:30:34.5
10	Edwin Ochoa ECU	1:32:24.8
11	Daniel Alexandre Voigt BRA	1:34:34.3
12	José Rubio ECU	1:35:23.5
13	Wilman Vera VEN	1:36:39.3
—^{*}	Damian Campaña ECU	1:39:00.4
14	Juan Carlos Noguera ARG	1:43:35.5

^{*}: Extra athlete (illegible for team and individual results).

==== Team 20km Men ====
Place	Country	Points
1st place, gold medalist(s)	Brazil	15 pts
2nd place, silver medalist(s)	Ecuador	18 pts

=== Men's 50km ===
Place	Athlete	Time
1st place, gold medalist(s)	Mário dos Santos BRA	4:12:52
2nd place, silver medalist(s)	Jonathan Cáceres ECU	4:14:44
3rd place, bronze medalist(s)	Edgar Cudco ECU	4:22:44
4	Cláudio Richardson dos Santos BRA	4:24:23
5	Fausto Quinde ECU	4:27:18
6	Edison Salazar ECU	4:44:28
—	Luiz Felipe dos Santos BRA	DQ
—	David Guevara ECU	DQ
—	Fabio Benito González ARG	DNF
—	Yerenman Salazar VEN	DNF

==== Team 50km Men ====
Place	Country	Points
1st place, gold medalist(s)	Ecuador	10 pts

=== Men's 10km Junior (U20) ===
Place	Athlete	Time
1st place, gold medalist(s)	Éider Arévalo COL	43:24
2nd place, silver medalist(s)	Kenny Martín Pérez COL	43:38
3rd place, bronze medalist(s)	Manuel Esteban Soto COL	43:43
—^{*}	Óscar Villavicencio ECU	43:59
4	Richard Vargas VEN	44:07
5	Marco Antonio Rodríguez BOL	44:32
6	Bruno Fidelis BRA	44:37
7	Jean Valenzuela CHI	45:20
8	Cristian Andrade ECU	46:27
9	José Sánchez ECU	46:27
10	Jorge Loya ECU	47:52
11	Lucas Ferreira BRA	48:12
12	Lucas Mazzo BRA	49:02
—^{*}	Benjamín Mugmal ECU	49:10
—^{*}	Darwin León ECU	49:35
13	Michael Merino CHI	54:41

^{*}: Extra athlete (illegible for team and individual results).

==== Team 10km Men Junior (U20) ====
Place	Country	Points
1st place, gold medalist(s)	Colombia	3 pts
2nd place, silver medalist(s)	Brazil	17 pts
3rd place, bronze medalist(s)	Ecuador	17 pts
4	Chile	20 pts

=== Men's 10km Youth (U18) ===
Place	Athlete	Time
1st place, gold medalist(s)	Paolo Yurivilca PER	44:60
2nd place, silver medalist(s)	Brian Pintado ECU	45:24
3rd place, bronze medalist(s)	Franco Chocho ECU	48:11
4	Hiago Garcia BRA	49:35
5	José David Ávila COL	51:06
—^{*}	Andrés Cedeño ECU	51:43
6	David Ríos COL	52:28
7	Pablo Rodríguez BOL	53:54
—	Ditter King CHI	DQ
—	Josué Moran ECU	DQ

^{*}: Extra athlete (illegible for team and individual results).

==== Team 10km Men Youth (U18) ====
Place	Country	Points
1st place, gold medalist(s)	Ecuador	5 pts
2nd place, silver medalist(s)	Colombia	11 pts

=== Women's 20km ===
Place	Athlete	Time
—^{*}	Erika Rocha de Sena BRA	1:33:24.0
1st place, gold medalist(s)	Arabelly Orjuela COL	1:34:40.2
2nd place, silver medalist(s)	Ingrid Hernández COL	1:34:55.5
3rd place, bronze medalist(s)	Milangela Rosales VEN	1:36:44.1
4	Claudia Balderrama BOL	1:36:45.8
5	Yadira Guamán ECU	1:38:19.4
6	Sandra Galvis COL	1:39:10.9
7	Paola Pérez ECU	1:41:10.3
8	Janeth Guamán ECU	1:41:45.3
9	Nayibe Rosales VEN	1:42:55.0
10	Gabriela Cornejo ECU	1:43:01.8
11	Geovana Irusta BOL	1:43:57.6
12	Magaly Bonilla ECU	1:45:21.9
13	Tânia Spindler BRA	1:45:35.5
14	Maritza Pacheco ECU	1:53:02.2
15	Daiana Luján ARG	1:54:18.5
16	Kerolayne Camila da Silva BRA	1:59:24.4
17	Florencia Thomas ARG	2:03:17.7
—	Eliana Renata da Silva BRA	DQ

^{*}: Extra athlete (illegible for team and individual results).

==== Team 20km Women ====
Place	Country	Points
1st place, gold medalist(s)	Colombia	9 pts
2nd place, silver medalist(s)	Ecuador	20 pts

=== Women's 10km Junior (U20) ===
Place	Athlete	Time
1st place, gold medalist(s)	Sandra Arenas COL	45:17
2nd place, silver medalist(s)	Ángela Castro BOL	46:60
3rd place, bronze medalist(s)	Wendy Cornejo BOL	47:01
4	Kimberly García PER	47:56
5	Yeseida Carrillo COL	48:18
6	Estefanía Valencia ECU	51:35
7	Larissa Aparecida Bueno BRA	51:39
—^{*}	Karina Bustos ECU	52:59
8	Emily Pistor BRA	54:05
9	Gleidys Montes VEN	54:25
10	Maricela Vega ECU	54:49
11	Paula Raissa Paz da Silva BRA	55:32
—^{*}	Yajaira Pozo ECU	55:46
12	Yenni Ortiz ARG	56:04
13	Cristal Paillalef CHI	57:09
14	Paola Ríos ECU	57:16
15	Karen Estrella ARG	1:05:13
16	Natalia Borghi ARG	1:06:36

^{*}: Extra athlete (illegible for team and individual results).

==== Team 10km Women Junior (U20) ====
Place	Country	Points
1st place, gold medalist(s)	Bolivia	5 pts
2nd place, silver medalist(s)	Colombia	6 pts
3rd place, bronze medalist(s)	Brazil	15 pts
4	Ecuador	16 pts
5	Argentina	27 pts

=== Women's 5km Youth (U18) ===
Place	Athlete	Time
1st place, gold medalist(s)	Karla Jaramillo ECU	24:49
2nd place, silver medalist(s)	Lina Abril COL	24:57
—^{*}	Michelli Semblantes ECU	25:02
3rd place, bronze medalist(s)	Wendy Díaz COL	26:18
4	Cheskaya Rosales VEN	27:28
5	Rayane de Oliveira BRA	27:48
6	Ivania De La Vega CHI	29:15
—	María Matailo ECU	DQ
—	Delfa Pesánttez ECU	DQ
—	Stefanía Coronado BOL	DQ

^{*}: Extra athlete (illegible for team and individual results).

==== Team 5km Women Youth (U18) ====
Place	Country	Points
1st place, gold medalist(s)	Colombia	5 pts
—	Ecuador	DNF

== Participation ==
The participation of 87 athletes from 8 countries is reported.

- Argentina (7)
- Bolivia (8)
- Brazil (16)
- Chile (5)
- Colombia (14)
- Ecuador (27)
- Peru (2)
- Venezuela (8)

== See also ==
- 2012 Race Walking Year Ranking
