= 2010 South American Race Walking Championships =

- Organisers: CONSUDATLE
- Edition: 18th
- Date: March 6–7
- Host city: Cochabamba, Cochabamba Department, Bolivia
- Venue: Paseo de "El Prado"
- Events: 7
- Participation: 66 athletes from 8 nations

The 2010 South American Race Walking Championships were held in Cochabamba, Bolivia, on March 6–7, 2010. The track of the championship runs in the Paseo El Prado (Avenida Ballivián). A detailed report on the event and an appraisal of the results was given by Eduardo Biscayart for the IAAF.

Complete results were published. The junior events are documented on the World Junior Athletics History webpages.

Results (both individual and team) as well as medal tables were also published elsewhere.

== Medallists ==
Event	Gold		Silver		Bronze	
Men
20 km	Rolando Saquipay (ECU)	1:24:50	Gustavo Restrepo (COL)	1:27:40	Yerko Araya (CHI)	1:30:45
50 km	Mesías Zapata (ECU)	4:17:00	Washington Alvarado (ECU)	4:21:08	David Guevara (ECU)	4:22:37
10 km Junior (U20)	Caio Bonfim (BRA)	43:08	José Leonardo Montaña (COL)	43:20	Niel García (PER)	46:10
10 km Youth (U18)	Éider Arévalo (COL)	43:35	Brian Pintado (ECU)	47:00	Óscar Villavicencio (ECU)	47:51
Team (Men)
20 km Team	Ecuador	10 pts	Brazil	31 pts		
50 km Team	Ecuador	6 pts				
10 km Junior (U20) Team	Ecuador	10 pts	Brazil	12 pts	Bolivia	16 pts
10 km Youth (U18) Team	Ecuador	5 pts	Bolivia	11 pts		
Women
20 km	Sandra Galvis (COL)	1:40:48	Claudia Balderrama (BOL)	1:42:48	Milanggela Rosales (VEN)	1:43:33
10 km Junior (U20)	Wendy Cornejo (BOL)	52:46	Ana Karina Bustos (ECU)	54:02	Katherine Álvarez (ECU)	55:20
5 km Youth (U18)	Kimberly García (PER)	24:24	Ana Karina Bustos (ECU)	25:11	Wendy Cornejo (BOL)	25:23
Team (Women)
20 km Team	Bolivia	15 pts	Ecuador	19 pts		
10 km Junior (U20) Team	Ecuador	5 pts	Bolivia	5 pts	Brazil	14 pts
5 km Youth (U18) Team	Peru	5 pts	Ecuador	7 pts	Bolivia	10 pts

== Results ==
=== Men's 20km ===
Place	Athlete	Time
1st place, gold medalist(s)	Rolando Saquipay ECU	1:24:50
2nd place, silver medalist(s)	Gustavo Restrepo COL	1:27:40
3rd place, bronze medalist(s)	Yerko Araya CHI	1:30:45
4	Jonathan Cáceres ECU	1:31:55
5	Ricardo Lojan ECU	1:34:16
6	Wilman Vera VEN	1:37:29
7	Fabio Benito González ARG	1:38:06
8	Luiz Felipe dos Santos BRA	1:38:24
9	Joaquín Quispe PER	1:38:26
10	Yerenman Salazar VEN	1:39:57
11	Daniel Perim Tomasi BRA	1:42:24
12	Moacir Zimmermann BRA	1:51:12
—	Andrés Chocho ECU	DQ
—	Ronald Quispe BOL	DQ
—	Edward Araya CHI	DQ

==== Team 20km Men ====
Place	Country	Points
1st place, gold medalist(s)	Ecuador	10 pts
2nd place, silver medalist(s)	Brazil	31 pts

=== Men's 50km ===
Place	Athlete	Time
1st place, gold medalist(s)	Mesías Zapata ECU	4:17:00
2nd place, silver medalist(s)	Washington Alvarado ECU	4:21:08
3rd place, bronze medalist(s)	David Guevara ECU	4:22:37
4	Edgar Cudco ECU	4:34:23
5	Miguel Ángel González BOL	5:13:34
—	Diogo Gamboa BRA	DNF
—	Julián Choque BOL	DNF

==== Team 50km Men ====
Place	Country	Points
1st place, gold medalist(s)	Ecuador	6 pts

=== Men's 10km Junior (U20) ===
Place	Athlete	Time
1st place, gold medalist(s)	Caio Bonfim BRA	43:08
2nd place, silver medalist(s)	José Leonardo Montaña COL	43:20
3rd place, bronze medalist(s)	Niel García PER	46:10
4	Brian Pintado ECU	46:50
5	Ariel Magallanes ARG	47:43
6	Óscar Villavicencio ECU	48:20
7	Marco Antonio Rodríguez BOL	50:19
8	Oscar Orozco ECU	50:19
9	Alvaro Carpio BOL	51:44
10	Jean Pierre Valenzuela CHI	51:54
11	Jean Pedro Rominhuk BRA	52:29
12	Hudson Santos BRA	52:35
13	Rodrigo Flores BOL	57:23

==== Team 10km Men Junior (U20) ====
Place	Country	Points
1st place, gold medalist(s)	Ecuador	10 pts
2nd place, silver medalist(s)	Brazil	12 pts
3rd place, bronze medalist(s)	Bolivia	16 pts

=== Men's 10km Youth (U18) ===
Place	Athlete	Time
1st place, gold medalist(s)	Éider Arévalo COL	43:35
2nd place, silver medalist(s)	Brian Pintado ECU	47:00
3rd place, bronze medalist(s)	Óscar Villavicencio ECU	47:51
4	Jean Pierre Valenzuela CHI	50:36
5	Marco Antonio Rodríguez BOL	50:43
6	Alvaro Carpio BOL	51:44
7	Dolourso Flores PER	54:35
8	Hiago Garcia BRA	56:46

==== Team 10km Men Youth (U18) ====
Place	Country	Points
1st place, gold medalist(s)	Ecuador	5 pts
2nd place, silver medalist(s)	Bolivia	11 pts

=== Women's 20km ===
Place	Athlete	Time
1st place, gold medalist(s)	Sandra Galvis COL	1:40:48
2nd place, silver medalist(s)	Claudia Balderrama BOL	1:42:48
3rd place, bronze medalist(s)	Milanggela Rosales VEN	1:43:33
4	Claudia Cornejo BOL	1:44:18
5	Yadira Guamán ECU	1:44:29
6	Johana Ordóñez ECU	1:45:08
7	Tânia Spindler BRA	1:45:36
8	Paola Pérez ECU	1:50:14
9	Jaaneth Mamani BOL	1:51:58
—	Cisiane Dutra Lopes BRA	DQ
—	Erica Rocha de Sena BRA	DQ

==== Team 20km Women ====
Place	Country	Points
1st place, gold medalist(s)	Bolivia	15 pts
2nd place, silver medalist(s)	Ecuador	19 pts

=== Women's 10km Junior (U20) ===
Place	Athlete	Time
1st place, gold medalist(s)	Wendy Cornejo BOL	52:46
2nd place, silver medalist(s)	Ana Karina Bustos ECU	54:02
3rd place, bronze medalist(s)	Katherine Álvarez ECU	55:20
4	Jessica Argote BOL	56:21
5	Cleia Silva BRA	56:27
6	Luisa Navarro COL	57:26
7	Ángela Castro BOL	58:38
8	Catherine Pérez BOL	58:46
9	Mayara Vicentainer BRA	1:02:15
10	Camila da Silva BRA	1:07:48
—	Nahir Viveros BOL	DQ

==== Team 10km Women Junior (U20) ====
Place	Country	Points
1st place, gold medalist(s)	Ecuador	5 pts
2nd place, silver medalist(s)	Bolivia	5 pts
3rd place, bronze medalist(s)	Brazil	14 pts

=== Women's 5km Youth (U18) ===
Place	Athlete	Time
1st place, gold medalist(s)	Kimberly García PER	24:24
2nd place, silver medalist(s)	Ana Karina Bustos ECU	25:11
3rd place, bronze medalist(s)	Wendy Cornejo BOL	25:23
4	Myrna García PER	25:48
5	Katherine Álvarez ECU	26:04
6	Ana Leydy Daza COL	27:33
7	Ángela Castro BOL	27:49
8	Nahir Viveros BOL	28:19
9	Andressa Da Silva BRA	28:51
10	Emely Torrico BOL	31:29
—	Nohelia Magne BOL	DQ

==== Team 5km Women Youth (U18) ====
Place	Country	Points
1st place, gold medalist(s)	Peru	5 pts
2nd place, silver medalist(s)	Ecuador	7 pts
3rd place, bronze medalist(s)	Bolivia	10 pts

== Participation ==
The participation of 66 athletes from 8 countries is reported.

- Argentina (2)
- Bolivia (16)
- Brazil (15)
- Chile (3)
- Colombia (6)
- Ecuador (16)
- Peru (5)
- Venezuela (3)

== See also ==
- 2010 Race Walking Year Ranking
