= 2002 South American Race Walking Championships =

- Organisers: CONSUDATLE
- Edition: 14th
- Date: September 14–15
- Host city: Puerto Saavedra, Araucanía, Chile
- Events: 7
- Participation: 83 athletes from 9 nations

The 2002 South American Race Walking Championships were held in Puerto Saavedra, Chile, on September 14–15, 2002. The event was also known as South American Race Walking Cup.

A short note on the event and an appraisal of the results was given by Eduardo Biscayart for the IAAF.

Complete results were published. The junior events are documented on the World Junior Athletics History webpages.

== Medallists ==
Event	Gold		Silver		Bronze	
Men
20 km	Sérgio Vieira Galdino (BRA)	1:24:23	Cristian Muñoz (CHI)	1:24:26	Fausto Quinde (ECU)	1:25:07
35 km	Edwin Centeno (PER)	2:48:13	Luis Figueroa (CHI)	2:53:25	Rolando Saquipay (ECU)	2:55:51
10 km Junior (U20)	Rafael Duarte (BRA)	42:31	Osvaldo Ortega (ECU)	44:47	Edwin Malacatus (ECU)	44:53
10 km Youth (U18)	Carlos Borgoño (CHI)	46:32	Eben Ezer Churqui (BOL)	46:35	Osvaldo Ortega (ECU)	46:37
Team (Men)
20 km Team	Ecuador	18 pts	Chile	19 pts		
35 km Team	No team finished					
10 km Junior (U20) Team	No team finished					
10 km Youth (U18) Team	Chile	15 pts	Argentina	36 pts		
Women
20 km	Geovanna Irusta (BOL)	1:41:21	Gianetti Bonfim (BRA)	1:42:23	Morelba Useche (VEN)	1:43:23
10 km Junior (U20)	Alessandra Picagevicz (BRA)	49:54	Cisiane Dutra Lopes (BRA)	50:11	Johana Malla (ECU)	52:34
5 km Youth (U18)	Johana Malla (ECU)	25:14	Luz Villamarín (COL)	25:20	Johana Ordóñez (ECU)	25:21
Team (Women)
20 km Team	Brazil	12 pts				
10 km Junior (U20) Team	Brazil	7 pts	Ecuador	16 pts	Chile	28 pts
5 km Youth (U18) Team	Ecuador	9 pts	Chile	24 pts		

== Results ==
=== Men's 20km ===
Place	Athlete	Time
1st place, gold medalist(s)	Sérgio Vieira Galdino BRA	1:24:23
2nd place, silver medalist(s)	Cristian Muñoz CHI	1:24:26
3rd place, bronze medalist(s)	Fausto Quinde ECU	1:25:07
4	Fredy Hernández COL	1:25:49
5	Xavier Moreno ECU	1:28:53
6	Hugo Aros CHI	1:30:28
7	Edwin Centeno PER	1:31:01
8	Ronald Huayta BOL	1:31:53
9	Mário dos Santos BRA	1:32:13
10	Andrés Chocho ECU	1:33:29
11	Jerzon Villagra CHI	1:38:12
—	José Alessandro Bagio BRA	DQ
—	Patricio Montero CHI	DQ
—	Jefferson Pérez ECU	DNF

==== Team 20km Men ====
Place	Country	Points
1st place, gold medalist(s)	Ecuador	18 pts
2nd place, silver medalist(s)	Chile	19 pts

=== Men's 35km ===
Place	Athlete	Time
1st place, gold medalist(s)	Edwin Centeno PER	2:48:13
2nd place, silver medalist(s)	Luis Figueroa CHI	2:53:25
3rd place, bronze medalist(s)	Rolando Saquipay ECU	2:55:51
4	Luis Villagra CHI	2:58:36
—	Cláudio Richardson dos Santos BRA	DQ
—	Hugo Aros CHI	DQ
—	Carlos Antonio Velozo CHI	DQ
—	Fredy Hernández COL	DNF

=== Men's 10km Junior (U20) ===
Place	Athlete	Time
1st place, gold medalist(s)	Rafael Duarte BRA	42:31
2nd place, silver medalist(s)	Oswaldo Ortega ECU	44:47
3rd place, bronze medalist(s)	Edwin Malacatus ECU	44:53
4	Elias Reynaga BOL	45:04
5	Alex Jara CHI	46:51
6	Luciano Muñoz CHI	50:52
7	Alejandro Vianello ARG	57:22
—	Cristián Bascuñán CHI	DQ
—	Fabio Benito González ARG	DQ
—	David Guevara ECU	DQ
—	Vanderlei dos Santos BRA	DQ
—	Diogo Gamboa BRA	DQ
—	German Rivillas COL	DNF

=== Men's 10km Youth (U18) ===
Place	Athlete	Time
1st place, gold medalist(s)	Carlos Borgoño CHI	46:32
2nd place, silver medalist(s)	Eben Ezer Churqui BOL	46:35
3rd place, bronze medalist(s)	Oswaldo Ortega ECU	46:37
4	Calisto Sevegnani BRA	46:37
5	Elias Reynaga BOL	47:47
6	Yerko Araya CHI	49:44
7	James Rendón COL	50:05
8	Edward Araya CHI	50:58
9	Fernando Matus CHI	51:59
10	Robinson Vivar ECU	52:20
11	Luis Saavedra ARG	58:12
12	Carlos Arriola ARG	59:50
13	Nataniel Florit ARG	1:04:27
—	Miguel Quisnancela ECU	DQ

==== Team 10km Men Youth (U18) ====
Place	Country	Points
1st place, gold medalist(s)	Chile	15 pts
2nd place, silver medalist(s)	Argentina	36 pts

=== Women's 20km ===
Place	Athlete	Time
1st place, gold medalist(s)	Geovanna Irusta BOL	1:41:21
2nd place, silver medalist(s)	Gianetti Bonfim BRA	1:42:23
3rd place, bronze medalist(s)	Morelba Useche VEN	1:43:23
4	Tânia Spindler BRA	1:47:03
5	Marcela Pacheco CHI	1:47:37
6	Rosane Prigol BRA	1:49:23
7	Lidia Carriego ARG	1:57:15
—	Sandra Zapata COL	DQ

==== Team 20km Women ====
Place	Country	Points
1st place, gold medalist(s)	Brazil	12 pts

=== Women's 10km Junior (U20) ===
Place	Athlete	Time
1st place, gold medalist(s)	Alessandra Picagevicz BRA	49:54
2nd place, silver medalist(s)	Cisiane Dutra Lopes BRA	50:11
3rd place, bronze medalist(s)	Johana Malla ECU	52:34
4	Erica de Sena BRA	52:44
5	Johana Ordóñez ECU	52:45
6	Gina Meneses COL	53:53
7	Josette Sepúlveda CHI	54:05
8	Adriana Jara ECU	56:20
9	Carla Litardo ECU	56:20
10	Marisol Cea CHI	57:24
11	Claudia Troncoso CHI	59:49
12	Paola Medina ARG	1:09:13
—	Lizbeth Zúñiga PER	DQ

==== Team 10km Women Junior (U20) ====
Place	Country	Points
1st place, gold medalist(s)	Brazil	7 pts
2nd place, silver medalist(s)	Ecuador	16 pts
3rd place, bronze medalist(s)	Chile	28 pts

=== Women's 5km Youth (U18) ===
Place	Athlete	Time
1st place, gold medalist(s)	Johana Malla ECU	25:14
2nd place, silver medalist(s)	Luz Villamarín COL	25:20
3rd place, bronze medalist(s)	Johana Ordóñez ECU	25:21
4	Erica de Sena BRA	26:35
5	Adriana Jara ECU	27:01
6	Carla Litardo ECU	27:24
7	Marcela Iturra CHI	27:52
8	Anita Rico CHI	28:14
9	Anita Jara CHI	29:45
10	Vanessa Contreras CHI	30:06
11	Dennis Oyarzún CHI	30:10
12	Lucy Lezcano PAR	33:06
13	Ana Alfonso ARG	33:09
—	Elizabeth Bravo ECU	DQ

==== Team 5km Women Youth (U18) ====
Place	Country	Points
1st place, gold medalist(s)	Ecuador	9 pts
2nd place, silver medalist(s)	Chile	24 pts

== Participation ==
The participation of 83 athletes from 9 countries is reported.

- Argentina (8)
- Bolivia (5)
- Brazil (16)
- Chile (24)
- Colombia (6)
- Ecuador (19)
- Paraguay (1)
- (Peru) Perú (3)
- Venezuela (1)

== See also ==
- 2002 Race Walking Year Ranking
