= 2004 South American Race Walking Championships =

- Organisers: CONSUDATLE
- Edition: 15th
- Date: April 3–4
- Host city: Los Ángeles, Bío Bío, Chile
- Venue: Avenida Ricardo Vicuña
- Events: 7
- Participation: 83 athletes from 8 nations

The 2004 South American Race Walking Championships were held in Los Ángeles, Chile, on April 3–4, 2004. The track of the championship runs in the Avenida Ricardo Vicuña. For the first time, the men's long race was 50 km rather than 35 km.

Complete results were published. The junior events are documented on the World Junior Athletics History webpages.

== Medallists ==
Event	Gold		Silver		Bronze	
Men
20 km	Rolando Saquipay (ECU)	1:22:29	Luis Fernando López (COL)	1:22:52	Fredy Hernández (COL)	1:23:08
50 km	Luis Villagra (CHI)	4:16:45	Alex Jara (CHI)	4:23:07	Cristián Bascuñán (CHI)	4:45:59
10 km Junior (U20)	Oswaldo Ortega (ECU)	42:00	Carlos Borgoño (CHI)	42:19	Yerko Araya (CHI)	43:41
10 km Youth (U18)	Herbert de Almeida (BRA)	46:28	Mauricio Arteaga (ECU)	46:46	Bryan Duarte (CHI)	47:07
Team (Men)
20 km Team	Colombia	9 pts	Ecuador	12 pts		
50 km Team	Chile	6 pts				
10 km Junior (U20) Team	Chile	12 pts	Bolivia	19 pts		
10 km Youth (U18) Team	Chile	13 pts				
Women
20 km	Geovanna Irusta (BOL)	1:35:25	Alessandra Picagevicz (BRA)	1:35:28	Sandra Zapata (COL)	1:39:13
10 km Junior (U20)	Yadira Hernández (ECU)	49:30	Johana Ordóñez (ECU)	49:30	Luz Villamarín (COL)	50:00
5 km Youth (U18)	Gabriela Cornejo (ECU)	25:55	Elizabeth Bravo (ECU)	26:35	Diana Montaluisa (ECU)	26:53
Team (Women)
20 km Team	Brazil	21 pts	Chile	26 pts		
10 km Junior (U20) Team	Ecuador	7 pts				
5 km Youth (U18) Team	Ecuador	6 pts	Chile	10 pts		

== Results ==
=== Men's 20km ===
Place	Athlete	Time
1st place, gold medalist(s)	Rolando Saquipay ECU	1:22:29
2nd place, silver medalist(s)	Luis Fernando López COL	1:22:52
3rd place, bronze medalist(s)	Fredy Hernández COL	1:23:08
4	Gustavo Restrepo COL	1:23:37
5	Andrés Chocho ECU	1:24:29
6	Xavier Moreno ECU	1:24:50
7	Fausto Quinde ECU	1:25:03
8	Rafael Fontenelle Duarte BRA	1:25:32
9	Xavier Malacatus ECU	1:26:51
10	Edwin Centeno PER	1:27:17
11	Hugo Aros CHI	1:27:34
12	Ronald Huayta BOL	1:30:09
13	Fabio González ARG	1:47:46.
—	Alexander Mendoza COL	DQ
—	Jerson Villagra CHI	DQ
—	Jorge Loréfice ARG	DQ
—	Cristian Muñoz CHI	DNF

==== Team 20km Men ====
Place	Country	Points
1st place, gold medalist(s)	Colombia	9 pts
2nd place, silver medalist(s)	Ecuador	12 pts

=== Men's 50km ===
Place	Athlete	Time
1st place, gold medalist(s)	Luis Villagra CHI	4:16:45
2nd place, silver medalist(s)	Alex Jara CHI	4:23:07
3rd place, bronze medalist(s)	Cristián Bascuñán CHI	4:45:59
—	Claudio Richardson dos Santos BRA	DQ
—	Moacir Zimmermann BRA	DQ
—	Luis Figueroa CHI	DQ

==== Team 50km Men ====
Place	Country	Points
1st place, gold medalist(s)	Chile	6 pts

=== Men's 10km Junior (U20) ===
Place	Athlete	Time
1st place, gold medalist(s)	Oswaldo Ortega ECU	42:00
2nd place, silver medalist(s)	Carlos Borgoño CHI	42:19
3rd place, bronze medalist(s)	Yerko Araya CHI	43:41
4	Eben Ezer Churqui BOL	45:20
5	Fillol Bayona VEN	46:49
6	Wilden Patty BOL	47:34
7	Joel Veras CHI	47:47
8	Luis Manuel Saavedra ARG	49:06
9	Elías Reynaga BOL	50:51
10	Hernán Calderón ARG	52:44
—	James Rendón COL	DQ
—	Edward Araya CHI	DQ
—	Vanderlei dos Santos BRA	DNF

==== Team 10km Men Junior (U20) ====
Place	Country	Points
1st place, gold medalist(s)	Chile	12 pts
2nd place, silver medalist(s)	Bolivia	19 pts

=== Men's 10km Youth (U18) ===
Place	Athlete	Time
1st place, gold medalist(s)	Herbert de Almeida BRA	46:28
2nd place, silver medalist(s)	Mauricio Arteaga ECU	46:46
3rd place, bronze medalist(s)	Bryan Duarte CHI	47:07
4	Fernando Matus CHI	48:49
5	Edwin Ochoa ECU	51:50
6	Richard Montero CHI	56:14
7	Jorge Ruíz COL	57:12
8	Nataniel Florit ARG	1:00:26
—	Nelson Cid CHI	DQ
—	Robinson Vivar ECU	DQ
—	Juan Manuel Cano ARG	DQ
—	Jonathan Cifuentes CHI	DQ

==== Team 10km Men Youth (U18) ====
Place	Country	Points
1st place, gold medalist(s)	Chile	13 pts

=== Women's 20km ===
Place	Athlete	Time
1st place, gold medalist(s)	Geovanna Irusta BOL	1:35:25
2nd place, silver medalist(s)	Alessandra Picagevicz BRA	1:35:28
3rd place, bronze medalist(s)	Sandra Zapata COL	1:39:13
4	Miriam Ramón ECU	1:39:42
5	Cristina Bohorquez COL	1:40:14
6	Marcela Pacheco CHI	1:41:01
7	Morelba Useche VEN	1:41:18
8	Josette Sepúlveda CHI	1:42:40
9	Gianetti Bonfim BRA	1:43:38
10	Cisiane Dutra Lopes BRA	1:45:09
11	Mabel Oncebay PER	1:47:07
12	Elizabeth Martínez CHI	1:52:25
13	Lidia de Carriego ARG	1:55:58
14	Liliana Garbarino ARG	2:16:30

==== Team 20km Women ====
Place	Country	Points
1st place, gold medalist(s)	Brazil	21 pts
2nd place, silver medalist(s)	Chile	26 pts

=== Women's 10km Junior (U20) ===
Place	Athlete	Time
1st place, gold medalist(s)	Yadira Hernández ECU	49:30
2nd place, silver medalist(s)	Johana Ordóñez ECU	49:30
3rd place, bronze medalist(s)	Luz Villamarín COL	50:00
4	Tatiana Orellana ECU	51:41
5	Ruth Riativa COL	52:48
6	Marilu Zanghelini BRA	55:08
7	Marisol Cea CHI	57:42
8	Anita Jara CHI	59:01

==== Team 10km Women Junior (U20) ====
Place	Country	Points
1st place, gold medalist(s)	Ecuador	7 pts

=== Women's 5km Youth (U18) ===
Place	Athlete	Time
1st place, gold medalist(s)	Gabriela Cornejo ECU	25:55
2nd place, silver medalist(s)	Elizabeth Bravo ECU	26:35
3rd place, bronze medalist(s)	Diana Montaluisa ECU	26:53
4	Karen Caamaño CHI	27:00
5	Marie Gajardo CHI	28:53
6	Claudia Troncoso CHI	29:13
7	Daiana Luján ARG	31:00
8	Ruth Luján ARG	34:02
—	Ingrid Hernández COL	DQ
—	Victoria Alarcón CHI	DQ
—	Dennis Oyarzún CHI	DQ
—	Claudia Cornejo BOL	DQ
—	Franciele da Costa BRA	DQ

==== Team 5km Women Youth (U18) ====
Place	Country	Points
1st place, gold medalist(s)	Ecuador	6 pts
2nd place, silver medalist(s)	Chile	10 pts

== Participation ==
The participation of 83 athletes from 8 countries is reported.

- Argentina (10)
- Bolivia (6)
- Brazil (10)
- Chile (26)
- Colombia (11)
- Ecuador (16)
- (Peru) Perú (2)
- Venezuela (2)

== See also ==
- 2004 Race Walking Year Ranking
