= 2001 South American Race Walking Championships =

- Organisers: CONSUDATLE
- Edition: 13th
- Date: October 27–28
- Host city: Cuenca, Azuay, Ecuador
- Venue: Avenida España, Parque Calderón
- Events: 7
- Participation: at least 76 athletes from 6 nations

The 2001 South American Race Walking Championships were held in Cuenca, Ecuador, on October 27–28, 2001. The track of the Cup runs in the Avenida España, Parque Calderón. The event was held jointly with the 2001 Pan American Race Walking Cup. The results for the 20 km races (both men and women) were extracted from the Pan American Race Walking Cup results, while the South American Race Walking Championships additionally featured separate races for men in 35 km, and for junior and youth athletes (both men and women).

Results were published (35 km only in part). The junior events are documented on the World Junior Athletics History webpages.

== Medallists ==
Event	Gold		Silver		Bronze	
Men
20 km	Jefferson Pérez (ECU)	1:26:21	Cristián Muñoz (CHI)	1:30:00	Fausto Quinde (ECU)	1:30:06
35 km	Fausto Quinde (ECU)	2:56:58	Edwin Centeno (PER)	3:01:49	Luis Figueroa (CHI)	3:03:56
10 km Junior (U20)	Andrés Chocho (ECU)	45:55	Víctor Marín (PER)	45:56	Gustavo Restrepo (COL)	46:42
10 km Youth (U18)	Juan Carlos Sandy (BOL)	47:50	Oswaldo Ortega (ECU)	48:14	German Rivillas (COL)	50:42
Team (Men)
20 km Team	Ecuador	10 pts				
35 km Team	Unknown					
10 km Junior (U20) Team	Ecuador	11 pts				
10 km Youth (U18) Team	Ecuador	13 pts				
Women
20 km	Geovana Irusta (BOL)	1:40:23	Cristina Bohórquez (COL)	1:46:55	Gianetti Bonfim (BRA)	1:46:55
10 km Junior (U20)	Luisa Paltin (ECU)	53:56	Mabel Oncebay (PER)	54:30	Alessandra Picagevicz (BRA)	55:36
5 km Youth (U18)	Alessandra Picagevicz (BRA)	24:26	Gina Meneses (COL)	26:19	Johana Ordóñez (ECU)	27:11
Team (Women)
20 km Team	No team finished					
10 km Junior (U20) Team	Ecuador	14 pts	Brazil	17 pts		
5 km Youth (U18) Team	Ecuador	14 pts				

== Results ==
=== Men's 20km ===
Place	Athlete	Time
1st place, gold medalist(s)	Jefferson Pérez ECU	1:26:21
2nd place, silver medalist(s)	Cristián Muñoz CHI	1:30:00
3rd place, bronze medalist(s)	Fausto Quinde ECU	1:30:06
4	Marco Taype PER	1:37:13
5	Hugo Aros CHI	1:37:33
6	Juan Albarracín ECU	1:55:38
7	Angel Pucha ECU	2:02:52
—	José Alessandro Bagio BRA	DQ
—	Mário José dos Santos BRA	DQ
—	Francielo de Souza Medeiros BRA	DQ
—	Luis Fernando López COL	DQ

==== Team 20km Men ====
Place	Country	Points
1st place, gold medalist(s)	Ecuador	10 pts

=== Men's 35km ===
Place	Athlete	Time
1st place, gold medalist(s)	Fausto Quinde ECU	2:56:58
2nd place, silver medalist(s)	Edwin Centeno PER	3:01:49
3rd place, bronze medalist(s)	Luis Figueroa CHI	3:03:56
Incomplete

=== Men's 10km Junior (U20) ===
Place	Athlete	Time
1st place, gold medalist(s)	Andrés Chocho ECU	45:55
2nd place, silver medalist(s)	Víctor Marín PER	45:56
3rd place, bronze medalist(s)	Gustavo Restrepo COL	46:42
4	Xavier Malacatus ECU	48:02
5	Rafael Duarte BRA	48:39
6	Flavio Maldonado ECU	50:40
7	David Guevara ECU	50:41
8	Edison Placencia ECU	54:51
9	Edgar Cudco ECU	1:03:21
—	Diogo Gamboa BRA	DQ
—	Dionisio Neira PER	DQ
—	Luiz dos Santos BRA	DNF
—	Jorge Aguilar PER	DNF

==== Team 10km Men Junior (U20) ====
Place	Country	Points
1st place, gold medalist(s)	Ecuador	11 pts

=== Men's 10km Youth (U18) ===
Place	Athlete	Time
1st place, gold medalist(s)	Juan Carlos Sandy BOL	47:50
2nd place, silver medalist(s)	Oswaldo Ortega ECU	48:14
3rd place, bronze medalist(s)	German Rivillas COL	50:42
4	Carlos Borgoño CHI	51:10
5	Camilo Litardo ECU	51:46
6	Cristian González ECU	54:02
7	Robinson Vivar ECU	55:32
8	David Villafuerte ECU	56:22
9	Daniel Voigt BRA	56:52
10	Luis Quinde ECU	58:26
11	José Luis Muñoz ECU	59:35
12	Luis Caldas ECU	59:37
—	Andres Cabrea ECU	DQ
—	Miguel Quisnancela ECU	DQ

==== Team 10km Men Youth (U18) ====
Place	Country	Points
1st place, gold medalist(s)	Ecuador	13 pts

=== Women's 20km ===
Place	Athlete	Time
1st place, gold medalist(s)	Geovana Irusta BOL	1:40:23
2nd place, silver medalist(s)	Cristina Bohórquez COL	1:46:55
3rd place, bronze medalist(s)	Gianetti Bonfim BRA	1:46:55
4	Tânia Spindler BRA	1:52:50
5	Gima Castelo ECU	1:53:41
6	Mónica Sánchez ECU	2:05:33
—	Miriam Gutiérrez ECU	DQ
—	Rosemar Piazza BRA	DNF

=== Women's 10km Junior (U20) ===
Place	Athlete	Time
1st place, gold medalist(s)	Luisa Paltin ECU	53:56
2nd place, silver medalist(s)	Mabel Oncebay PER	54:30
3rd place, bronze medalist(s)	Alessandra Picagevicz BRA	55:36
4	Johana Peña COL	56:32
5	Cisiane Lopes BRA	57:03
6	Leidi Tena ECU	58:50
7	Alexandra Ortíz ECU	59:26
8	Carla Litardo ECU	1:00:46
9	Larisa da Silva BRA	1:00:55
10	Viviana Astudillo ECU	1:01:54
—	Ariana Quino Salazar BOL	DQ
—	Elizabeth Ramos PER	DQ
—	Lizbeth Zúñiga PER	DNF

==== Team 10km Women Junior (U20) ====
Place	Country	Points
1st place, gold medalist(s)	Ecuador	14 pts
2nd place, silver medalist(s)	Brazil	17 pts

=== Women's 5km Youth (U18) ===
Place	Athlete	Time
1st place, gold medalist(s)	Alessandra Picagevicz BRA	24:26
2nd place, silver medalist(s)	Gina Meneses COL	26:19
3rd place, bronze medalist(s)	Johana Ordóñez ECU	27:11
4	Josette Sepúlveda CHI	27:25
5	Elizabeth Bravo ECU	27:54
6	Adriana Jara ECU	28:06
7	Patricia Amboya ECU	28:24
8	Gabriela Cornejo ECU	30:01
9	Veronica Morales ECU	30:07
10	Mayra Tutillo ECU	30:12
—	Juana Cachi PER	DQ
—	Johana Malla ECU	DQ
—	Leydi Palomino PER	DQ
—	Angela Ramos PER	DQ
—	Norma Tenesaca ECU	DQ

==== Team 5km Women Youth (U18) ====
Place	Country	Points
1st place, gold medalist(s)	Ecuador	14 pts

== Participation ==
The participation of at least 76 athletes from 6 countries is reported.

- Bolivia (3)
- Brazil (14)
- Chile (5)
- Colombia (6)
- Ecuador (37)
- Peru (11)

== See also ==
- 2001 Race Walking Year Ranking
