= 2005 Pan American Race Walking Cup =

- Organisers: Pan American Race Walking Committee
- Edition: 12th
- Date: 7–8 May
- Host city: Lima, Peru
- Venue: Avenida Augusto Pérez Aranibar
- Events: 5
- Participation: 120 (+ 10 guests) athletes from 16 nations

The 2005 Pan American Race Walking Cup was held in Lima, Peru on 7–8 May. The track of the Cup runs in the Avenida Augusto Pérez Aranibar.

A detailed report was given by Eduardo Biscayart. Complete results were published.

== Medallists ==
Event	Gold		Silver		Bronze	
Men
10 km walk (junior event)	Alex Tapia (PER)	42:11	Robinson Vivar (ECU)	42:28	Yassir Cabrera (PAN)	43:20
20 km walk	Rolando Saquipay (ECU)	1:19:21	Luis Fernando López (COL)	1:20:26	Sergio Vieira Galdino (BRA)	1:21:29
50 km walk	Miguel Solís (MEX)	3:54:24	Horacio Nava (MEX)	3:59:26	Claudio Erasmo Vargas (MEX)	4:03:03
Men (Team)
Team 10 km walk (junior event)	Ecuador	7 pts	Peru	8 pts	Puerto Rico	22 pts
Team 20 km walk	Ecuador	16 pts	Mexico	23 pts	Brazil	32 pts
Team 50 km walk	Mexico	6 pts	United States	28 pts		
Women
10 km walk (junior event)	Rachel Lavallée (CAN)	47:37	Maria Michta (USA)	48:03	Verónica Colindres (ESA)	48:06
20 km walk	Cristina López (ESA)	1:30:35	Miriam Ramón (ECU)	1:31:25	Graciela Mendoza (MEX)	1:33:04
Women (Team)
Team 10 km walk (junior event)	Ecuador	10 pts	Peru	13 pts	Canada	17 pts
Team 20 km walk	Mexico	22 pts				

== Results ==
=== Men's 20 km ===
Place	Athlete	Time
1st place, gold medalist(s)	Rolando Saquipay ECU	1:19:21
2nd place, silver medalist(s)	Luis Fernando López COL	1:20:26
3rd place, bronze medalist(s)	Sergio Vieira Galdino BRA	1:21:29
4	Gustavo Restrepo COL	1:22:01
5	Daniel García MEX	1:22:43
6	Fausto Quinde ECU	1:23:06
7	Gabriel Ortíz MEX	1:23:21
8	Edwin Centeno PER	1:24:54
9	Oswaldo Ortega ECU	1:25:51
10	Tim Seaman USA	1:27:18
11	Álvaro García MEX	1:27:34
—^{*}	Oscar Ramírez MEX	1:27:38
12	Ronald Huayta BOL	1:27:38
13	Carlos Borgoño CHI	1:27:48
14	Mário José dos Santos BRA	1:29:01
15	José Bernardo Bagio BRA	1:29:37
16	John Nunn USA	1:29:44
—^{*}	Edwin Malacatus ECU	1:29:45
17	Juan Carlos Sandy BOL	1:30:08
18	Loisel Gutiérrez CUB	1:30:53
19	Franklin Aduviri BOL	1:32:50
20	Wilman Vera VEN	1:33:53
21	Jesús Chirino VEN	1:34:04
22	Luis Mercado PUR	1:34:39
23	Theron Kissinger USA	1:35:45
24	Silvano Choquetarqui BOL	1:37:30
25	Jocelyn Ruest CAN	1:39:19
26	José Ramón Enrique DOM	1:39:33
27	Michael Tarantino USA	1:44:04
28	José Ramírez PUR	1:50:24
—	Alexander Mendoza COL	DQ
—	José Hernández MEX	DQ
—	Víctor Marín PER	DQ
—	Andrés Chocho ECU	DNF
—	Cristian Muñoz CHI	DNF

^{*}: Started as a guest out of competition.

==== Team ====
Place	Country	Points
1st place, gold medalist(s)	Ecuador	16 pts
2nd place, silver medalist(s)	Mexico	23 pts
3rd place, bronze medalist(s)	Brazil	32 pts
4	Bolivia	48 pts
5	United States	49 pts

=== Men's 50 km ===
Place	Athlete	Time
1st place, gold medalist(s)	Miguel Solís MEX	3:54:24
2nd place, silver medalist(s)	Horacio Nava MEX	3:59:26
3rd place, bronze medalist(s)	Claudio Erasmo Vargas MEX	4:03:03
—^{*}	Rogelio Sánchez MEX	4:04:05
4	Xavier Moreno ECU	4:05:38
5	Cristián Bascuñán CHI	4:07:54
6	Denis Estrada GUA	4:17:04
7	Philip Dunn USA	4:18:32
—^{*}	Jesús Sánchez MEX	4:20:35
8	Rodrigo Moreno COL	4:25:29
9	David Guevara ECU	4:26:40
10	Ray Sharp USA	4:38:53
11	Eduardo Parrot USA	4:45:02
12	Iván Núñez PER	4:45:05
—	Celso Calderón PER	DQ
—	Moacir Zimmermann BRA	DQ
—	Joaquín Córdoba COL	DQ
—	Dionisio Neyra PER	DQ
—	Franklin Aduviri BOL	DNF
—	Patricio Villacorte ECU	DNF
—	Dave McGovern USA	DNF
—	Jorge Aguilar PER	DNF

^{*}: Started as a guest out of competition.

==== Team ====
Place	Country	Points
1st place, gold medalist(s)	Mexico	6 pts
2nd place, silver medalist(s)	United States	28 pts

=== Men's 10 km (Junior) ===
Place	Athlete	Time
1st place, gold medalist(s)	Alex Tapia PER	42:11
2nd place, silver medalist(s)	Robinson Vivar ECU	42:28
3rd place, bronze medalist(s)	Yassir Cabrera PAN	43:20
4	John Edison García COL	43:29
5	Edwin Ochoa ECU	43:51
6	Mauricio Arteaga ECU	44:13
7	Pavel Chihuán PER	44:28
8	Noel Santini PUR	44:36
9	Zachary Pollinger USA	44:47
10	Edward Araya CHI	44:51
11	Wilden Patty BOL	45:07
—^{*}	José Muñoz ECU	45:22
—^{*}	Oscar Romero ECU	45:37
12	Nelson Bonilla DOM	45:40
13	Uriel Yucra Tapai PER	45:40
—^{*}	Washington Alvarado ECU	46:07
14	José Bonilla PUR	46:18
15	Pierre-Luc Ménard CAN	46:36
16	Jared Swehosky USA	46:45
17	Christopher Diaz USA	47:33
18	Mario Bran GUA	52:59
—	Yerko Araya CHI	DQ
—	Marco Benavides ESA	DQ
—	Eder Sánchez MEX	DQ
—	José Sánchez MEX	DQ

^{*}: Started as a guest out of competition.

==== Team ====
Place	Country	Points
1st place, gold medalist(s)	Ecuador	7 pts
2nd place, silver medalist(s)	Peru	8 pts
3rd place, bronze medalist(s)	Puerto Rico	22 pts
4	United States	42 pts

=== Women's 20 km ===
Place	Athlete	Time
1st place, gold medalist(s)	Cristina López ESA	1:30:35
2nd place, silver medalist(s)	Miriam Ramón ECU	1:31:25
3rd place, bronze medalist(s)	Graciela Mendoza MEX	1:33:04
4	Evelyn Núñez GUA	1:36:18
5	Mabel Oncebay PER	1:37:57
6	Daisy González MEX	1:38:06
7	Nidia Moreno COL	1:38:34
8	Amber Antonia USA	1:38:42
9	Yorelis Sánchez CUB	1:39:00
10	Bobbi Jo Chapman USA	1:39:47
11	Marina Crivello CAN	1:40:13
12	Tatiana Orellana ECU	1:40:35
13	Sandra Evaristo MEX	1:40:38
14	Gianetti de Sena Bonfin BRA	1:43:24
15	Marcela Pacheco CHI	1:44:27
16	Josette Sepúlveda CHI	1:44:54
17	Jeanethe Mamani BOL	1:45:02
18	Karina Dueñas VEN	1:45:12
19	Alessandra Picagevicz BRA	1:47:43
20	Eunice Chávez BOL	1:49:41
—	María Rojas COL	DQ
—	Deborah Huberty USA	DQ
—	Sara Standley USA	DQ
—	Cristiane Martín BRA	DQ
—	Geovana Irusta BOL	DNF

==== Team ====
Place	Country	Points
1st place, gold medalist(s)	Mexico	22 pts

=== Women's 10 km (Junior) ===
Place	Athlete	Time
1st place, gold medalist(s)	Rachel Lavallée CAN	47:37
2nd place, silver medalist(s)	Maria Michta USA	48:03
3rd place, bronze medalist(s)	Verónica Colindres ESA	48:06
4	Johana Ordóñez ECU	48:30
5	Jenny Llactahuamán PER	48:53
6	Magaly Andrade ECU	49:16
7	Yadira Guamán ECU	49:36
8	Minerva García PER	50:10
9	Sandra Galvis COL	50:35
10	Farith Morales PER	50:35
11	Rosa María Orozco MEX	51:14
12	Mayra Pérez GUA	51:23
13	Jamy Franco GUA	52:04
—^{*}	Gabriela Cornejo ECU	52:14
14	Tatiana González MEX	52:35
15	Chelsea Rodriguez CAN	52:51
16	Katy Hayes USA	53:08
17	Dianette Vázquez PUR	53:28
—^{*}	Carla Litardo ECU	53:29
18	Nataly Raio CHI	53:55
—^{*}	Gaby Rojas PER	54:42
19	Lauren Forgues USA	57:43
—	Marandeliz Arroyo PUR	DQ
—	Roxanne Rivera PUR	DNF

^{*}: Started as a guest out of competition.

==== Team ====
Place	Country	Points
1st place, gold medalist(s)	Ecuador	10 pts
2nd place, silver medalist(s)	Peru	13 pts
3rd place, bronze medalist(s)	Canada	17 pts
4	United States	19 pts
5	Guatemala	25 pts
6	Mexico	26 pts

== Participation ==
The participation of 120 athletes from 16 countries is reported.

- Bolivia (8)
- Brazil (7)
- Canada (5)
- Chile (8)
- Colombia (9)
- Cuba (2)
- Dominican Republic (2)
- Ecuador (15)
- El Salvador (3)
- Guatemala (5)
- Mexico (14)
- Panama (1)
- Peru (13)
- Puerto Rico (7)
- United States (18)
- Venezuela (3)

== See also ==
- 2005 Race Walking Year Ranking
