= 2008 South American Race Walking Championships =

- Organisers: CONSUDATLE
- Edition: 17th
- Date: March 15-16
- Host city: Cuenca, Azuay, Ecuador
- Venue: Avenida España
- Events: 7
- Participation: 74 athletes from 7 nations

The 2008 South American Race Walking Championships were held in Cuenca, Ecuador, on March 15-16, 2008. The track of the championship runs in the Avenida España.

A detailed report on the event and an appraisal of the results was given.

Complete results were published. The junior events are documented on the World Junior Athletics History webpages.

== Medallists ==
Event	Gold		Silver		Bronze	
Men
20km	Luis Fernando López (COL)	1:24:38	Rolando Saquipay (ECU)	1:25:41	James Rendón (COL)	1:27:07
50km	Mesías Zapata (ECU)	4:15:26	David Guevara (ECU)	4:33:33	Edwin Ochoa (ECU)	4:34:55
10km Junior (U20)	Julián Rendón (COL)	45:07	Ricardo Lojan (ECU)	45:47	José Leonardo Montaña (COL)	46:06
10km Youth (U18)	Jhon Castañeda (COL)	46:50	Caio Bonfim (BRA)	47:00	José Fernández (ECU)	48:26
Team (Men)
20km Team	Colombia	10 pts	Ecuador	16 pts	Chile	37 pts
50km Team	Ecuador	6 pts				
10km Junior (U20) Team	Colombia	4 pts	Ecuador	6 pts	Brazil	15 pts
10km Youth (U18) Team	Ecuador	7 pts				
Women
20km	Sandra Zapata (COL)	1:39:02	Johana Ordóñez (ECU)	1:39:28	Janeth Guamán (ECU)	1:40:25
10km Junior (U20)	Anlly Pineda (COL)	49:13	Claudia Cornejo (BOL)	49:22	Maria Rayo (COL)	49:41
5km Youth (U18)	Ximena Sangoquisa (ECU)	25:39	Kimberly García (PER)	25:51	Wendy Cornejo (BOL)	26:03
Team (Women)
20km Team	Ecuador	9 pts	Colombia	13 pts		
10km Junior (U20) Team	Colombia	4 pts	Ecuador	10 pts	Brazil	17 pts
5km Youth (U18) Team	Ecuador	5 pts				

== Results ==
=== Men's 20km ===
Place	Athlete	Time
1st place, gold medalist(s)	Luis Fernando López COL	1:24:38
2nd place, silver medalist(s)	Rolando Saquipay ECU	1:25:41
3rd place, bronze medalist(s)	James Rendón COL	1:27:07
4	Pavel Chihuán PER	1:28:56
5	Mauricio Arteaga ECU	1:29:16
6	John Edison García COL	1:30:07
7	Juan Manuel Cano ARG	1:30:40
8	Rafael Duarte BRA	1:31:09
—^{*}	Andrés Chocho ECU	1:31:27
9	Claudio Villanueva ECU	1:32:30
10	Yerko Araya CHI	1:32:34
11	Alex Tapia PER	1:33:17
12	Edward Araya CHI	1:39:11
13	Jonathan Riekmann BRA	1:40:22
14	Fabio Benito González ARG	1:40:42
15	Camilo Acuña CHI	1:41:43
—	José Alessandro Bagio BRA	DNF
—	Patricio Ortega ECU	DNF

^{*}: Extra athlete (illegible for team and individual results).

==== Team 20km Men ====
Place	Country	Points
1st place, gold medalist(s)	Colombia	10 pts
2nd place, silver medalist(s)	Ecuador	16 pts
3rd place, bronze medalist(s)	Chile	37 pts

=== Men's 50km ===
Place	Athlete	Time
1st place, gold medalist(s)	Mesías Zapata ECU	4:15:26
—^{*}	Fausto Quinde ECU	4:25:27
2nd place, silver medalist(s)	David Guevara ECU	4:33:33
3rd place, bronze medalist(s)	Edwin Ochoa ECU	4:34:55
—^{*}	Edgar Cudco ECU	4:42:57
4	Luis Felipe dos Santos BRA	4:47:45
—	Samir César Sabadin BRA	DNF
—	Luis Figueroa CHI	DNF

^{*}: Extra athlete (illegible for team and individual results).

==== Team 50km Men ====
Place	Country	Points
1st place, gold medalist(s)	Ecuador	6 pts

=== Men's 10km Junior (U20) ===
Place	Athlete	Time
1st place, gold medalist(s)	Julián Rendón COL	45:07
2nd place, silver medalist(s)	Ricardo Lojan ECU	45:47
3rd place, bronze medalist(s)	José Leonardo Montaña COL	46:06
4	Jonathan Cáceres ECU	46:28
5	Felipe Toloza CHI	48:16
6	Samuel Babativa COL	48:55
7	Diego Martin BRA	50:29
8	Tiago Fonseca BRA	54:23
—	Washington Alvarado ECU	DQ
—	Dejaime de Oliveira BRA	DQ
—^{*}	Diego Fernández ECU	DNS

^{*}: Extra athlete (illegible for team and individual results).

==== Team 10km Men Junior (U20) ====
Place	Country	Points
1st place, gold medalist(s)	Colombia	4 pts
2nd place, silver medalist(s)	Ecuador	6 pts
3rd place, bronze medalist(s)	Brazil	15 pts

=== Men's 10km Youth (U18) ===
Place	Athlete	Time
1st place, gold medalist(s)	Jhon Castañeda COL	46:50
2nd place, silver medalist(s)	Caio Bonfim BRA	47:00
3rd place, bronze medalist(s)	José Fernández ECU	48:26
4	Andrés Díaz ECU	48:58
—^{*}	Oscar Orozco ECU	51:00
5	Henry Gajardo CHI	51:02
6	Ariel Magallanes ARG	56:04
—	Jackson Vivar ECU	DQ

^{*}: Extra athlete (illegible for team and individual results).

==== Team 10km Men Youth (U18) ====
Place	Country	Points
1st place, gold medalist(s)	Ecuador	7 pts

=== Women's 20km ===
Place	Athlete	Time
1st place, gold medalist(s)	Sandra Zapata COL	1:39:02
2nd place, silver medalist(s)	Johana Ordóñez ECU	1:39:28
3rd place, bronze medalist(s)	Janeth Guamán ECU	1:40:25
4	Miriam Ramón ECU	1:40:26
5	Leslie Guavita COL	1:44:00
6	Yadira Guamán ECU	1:44:39
7	Sandra Galvis COL	1:45:06
8	Tânia Spindler BRA	1:46:48
9	Janeth Mamani BOL	1:47:38
10	Marcela Pacheco CHI	1:48:38
—^{*}	Magaly Andrade ECU	1:53:26
11	Josette Sepúlveda CHI	1:53:59
12	Elianay Santana da Silva Pereira BRA	2:01:00
—	Vanessa Contreras CHI	DNF
—	Alessandra Picagevicz BRA	DNF

^{*}: Extra athlete (illegible for team and individual results).

==== Team 20km Women ====
Place	Country	Points
1st place, gold medalist(s)	Ecuador	9 pts
2nd place, silver medalist(s)	Colombia	13 pts

=== Women's 10km Junior (U20) ===
Place	Athlete	Time
1st place, gold medalist(s)	Anlly Pineda COL	49:13
2nd place, silver medalist(s)	Claudia Cornejo BOL	49:22
3rd place, bronze medalist(s)	Maria Rayo COL	49:41
4	Gabriela Cornejo ECU	50:15
5	Lina Cruz COL	52:18
6	Adriana Velázquez ECU	53:35
—^{*}	Andrea Gordón ECU	57:10
7	Daiana Luján ARG	58:13
8	Franciele da Costa BRA	59:57
9	Liliane Barbosa BRA	1:01:22
10	Pámela da Silva BRA	1:03:09
—	Paola Pérez ECU	DQ

^{*}: Extra athlete (illegible for team and individual results).

==== Team 10km Women Junior (U20) ====
Place	Country	Points
1st place, gold medalist(s)	Colombia	4 pts
2nd place, silver medalist(s)	Ecuador	10 pts
3rd place, bronze medalist(s)	Brazil	17 pts

=== Women's 5km Youth (U18) ===
Place	Athlete	Time
1st place, gold medalist(s)	Ximena Sangoquisa ECU	25:39
2nd place, silver medalist(s)	Kimberly García PER	25:51
3rd place, bronze medalist(s)	Wendy Cornejo BOL	26:03
4	Rita Andrade ECU	26:23
—^{*}	Katherine Álvarez ECU	27:41
5	Janeth Huiracocha ECU	28:08
6	Viviana Jurado COL	28:49
7	Mayara Vicentainer BRA	29:03
8	Maricela Salamanca CHI	30:21
9	Romina Oyola ARG	31:04

^{*}: Extra athlete (illegible for team and individual results).

==== Team 5km Women Youth (U18) ====
Place	Country	Points
1st place, gold medalist(s)	Ecuador	5 pts

== Participation ==
The participation of 74 athletes from 7 countries is reported.

- Argentina (5)
- Bolivia (3)
- Brazil (16)
- Chile (10)
- Colombia (14)
- Ecuador (23)
- Peru (3)

== See also ==
- 2008 Race Walking Year Ranking
