= 2014 South American Race Walking Championships =

- Organisers: CONSUDATLE
- Edition: 20th
- Date: February 15–16
- Host city: Cochabamba, Cochabamba Department, Bolivia
- Venue: Paseo El Prado
- Events: 7
- Participation: 69 + 4 guests athletes from 6 + 1 guest nations

The 2014 South American Race Walking Championships took place on February 15–16, 2014. The races were held on a 2 km circuit at the Paseo El Prado in Cochabamba, Bolivia. A detailed report of the event was given for the IAAF.

Complete results were published.

== Medallists ==
Event	Gold		Silver		Bronze	
Men
Men's 20 km	Rolando Saquipay; Ecuador	1:26:36	Marco Antonio Rodríguez; Bolivia	1:27:16	Pavel Chihuán (Peru) Perú	1:27:34
Men's 50 km	Ronald Quispe; Bolivia	4:25:02	Jonathan Rieckmann; Brazil	4:40:12	Cláudio Richardson dos Santos; Brazil	4:43:19
Men's 10 km Junior (U20)	Brian Pintado; Ecuador	43:46	Paolo Yurivilca (Peru) Perú	44:18	Brayan Fuentes; Colombia	44:33
Men's 10 km Youth (U18)	Pablo Armando Rodríguez; Bolivia	44:49	César Rodríguez (Peru) Perú	44:49	Edgar Salazar (Peru) Perú	47:51
Women
Women's 20 km	Kimberly García (Peru) Perú	1:35:34	Claudia Balderrama; Bolivia	1:36:25	Wendy Cornejo; Bolivia	1:37:11
Women's 10 km Junior (U20)	Karla Jaramillo; Ecuador	49:22	Jéssica Hancco (Peru) Perú	49:44	Stefany Coronado; Bolivia	51:53
Women's 5 km Youth (U18)	Nataly León; Ecuador	26:01	Luz Karen Mena; Colombia	26:13	Michelle Varas; Chile	26:52

== Results ==
=== Men's 20km ===
Rank	Athlete	Country	Time
1st place, gold medalist(s)	Rolando Saquipay	Ecuador	1:26:36
—^{†}	Érick Barrondo	Guatemala	1:26:42
2nd place, silver medalist(s)	Marco Antonio Rodríguez	Bolivia	1:27:16
3rd place, bronze medalist(s)	Pavel Chihuán	(Peru) Perú	1:27:34
4	Mauricio Arteaga	Ecuador	1:27:52
5	Iván Garrido	Colombia	1:31:07
—^{†}	Aníbal Paau	Guatemala	1:31:11
6	José Alessandro Bagio	Brazil	1:34:47
7	Jorge Stiven Díaz	Colombia	1:36:15
8	Moacir Zimmermann	Brazil	1:36:19
—	Caio Bonfim	Brazil	DQ
—	Sergio Carrillo	(Peru) Perú	DQ

^{†}: Guest athlete.

=== Men's 50km ===
Rank	Athlete	Country	Time
1st place, gold medalist(s)	Ronald Quispe	Bolivia	4:25:02
2nd place, silver medalist(s)	Jonathan Rieckmann	Brazil	4:40:12
3rd place, bronze medalist(s)	Cláudio Richardson dos Santos	Brazil	4:43:19
4	Luiz Felipe dos Santos	Brazil	4:53:28
—	Jhon Castañeda	Colombia	DNF

=== Men's 10km Junior (U20) ===
Rank	Athlete	Country	Time
1st place, gold medalist(s)	Brian Pintado	Ecuador	43:46
2nd place, silver medalist(s)	Paolo Yurivilca	(Peru) Perú	44:18
3rd place, bronze medalist(s)	Brayan Fuentes	Colombia	44:33
4	César Rodríguez	(Peru) Perú	45:29
5	Edgar Salazar	(Peru) Perú	46:25
6	Edwin Quisbert-Sirpa	Bolivia	48:48
7	Fulviano Soares de Campos	Brazil	49:33
8	Cristaldo Quispe	Bolivia	50:53
9	David Cayllante	Bolivia	51:15
10	Braulio Morocho	Ecuador	51:29
11	Luis Ricardo Santos	Brazil	52:22
12	Roberto Churqui	Chile	52:22
13	Yojan Millán	Chile	53:13
14	Dieter King	Chile	53:35
15	Josemar Espinola Ferreira	Brazil	56:24

=== Men's 10km Youth (U18) ===
Rank	Athlete	Country	Time
1st place, gold medalist(s)	Pablo Armando Rodríguez	Bolivia	44:49
2nd place, silver medalist(s)	César Rodríguez	(Peru) Perú	44:49
3rd place, bronze medalist(s)	Edgar Salazar	(Peru) Perú	47:51
4	Cristian Merchán	Colombia	49:57
5	Jhonatan Amores	Ecuador	50:16
6	Yojan Millán	Chile	51:11
7	Ariel Cayllante	Bolivia	52:15
8	Gustavo Mamani	Bolivia	52:32
—	Luan de Almeida Ferreira	Brazil	DQ
—	Marco Salinas	Ecuador	DQ

=== Women's 20km ===
Rank	Athlete	Country	Time
1st place, gold medalist(s)	Kimberly García	(Peru) Perú	1:35:34
2nd place, silver medalist(s)	Claudia Balderrama	Bolivia	1:36:25
3rd place, bronze medalist(s)	Wendy Cornejo	Bolivia	1:37:11
4	Sandra Galvis	Colombia	1:37:57
—^{†}	Mayra Herrera	Guatemala	1:39:01
—^{†}	Mirna Ortiz	Guatemala	1:39:32
5	Ángela Castro	Bolivia	1:40:34
6	Arabelly Orjuela	Colombia	1:41:51
7	Magaly Bonilla	Ecuador	1:42:32
8	Cisiane Dutra Lopes	Brazil	1:48:43
9	Elianay Santana da Silva Pereira	Brazil	1:58:30
10	Nair da Rosa	Brazil	2:04:20
—	Yesenia Carrillo	Colombia	DQ

^{†}: Guest athlete.

=== Women's 10km Junior (U20) ===
Rank	Athlete	Country	Time
1st place, gold medalist(s)	Karla Jaramillo	Ecuador	49:22
2nd place, silver medalist(s)	Jéssica Hancco	(Peru) Perú	49:44
3rd place, bronze medalist(s)	Stefany Coronado	Bolivia	51:53
4	Daniela Fernanda Pastrana	Colombia	52:39
5	Jéssica Cabrera	Ecuador	53:56
6	Carolina Salapure	Bolivia	57:12
7	Tatiana Luque	Bolivia	57:56
8	Rayane Caroline Lins de Oliveira	Brazil	57:59
9	Andressa Souza da Silva	Brazil	58:36
10	Diana Sarasaya	(Peru) Perú	59:02
11	Linara Zancanela da Cunha	Brazil	1:00:16

=== Women's 5km Youth (U18) ===
Rank	Athlete	Country	Time
1st place, gold medalist(s)	Nataly León	Ecuador	26:01
2nd place, silver medalist(s)	Luz Karen Mena	Colombia	26:13
3rd place, bronze medalist(s)	Michelle Varas	Chile	26:52
4	Diana Sarasaya	(Peru) Perú	26:59
5	Odette Huanca	Bolivia	27:58
6	Anastasia Sanzana	Chile	28:42
7	Milena Francesca de Souza	Brazil	28:58
8	Daniela Parra	Chile	30:13
9	Juliana Archondo	Bolivia	31:29
10	Karely Quiroga	Bolivia	31:51
—	Evelyn Inga	(Peru) Perú	DQ
—	Jessica Cabrera	Ecuador	DNS
—	Leyde Guerra	(Peru) Perú	DNS

== Medal table (unofficial) ==
* Host nation (Bolivia)

Rank	Nation	Gold	Silver	Bronze	Total
1	Ecuador (ECU)	4	0	0	4
2	Bolivia (BOL)*	2	2	2	6
3	Peru (PER)	1	3	2	6
4	Brazil (BRA)	0	1	1	2
4	Colombia (COL)	0	1	1	2
6	Chile (CHI)	0	0	1	1
Totals (6 entries)		7	7	7	21

== Participation ==
According to an unofficial count, 69 athletes (+ 4 guests) from 6 countries (+ 1 guest country) participated.

- Bolivia (17)
- Brazil (17)
- Chile (6)
- Colombia (10)
- Ecuador (10)
- (Peru) Perú (9)

Guest nation:

- Guatemala (4)

== See also ==
- 2014 Race Walking Year Ranking
