= Edward Araya =

Chilean race walker (born 1986)

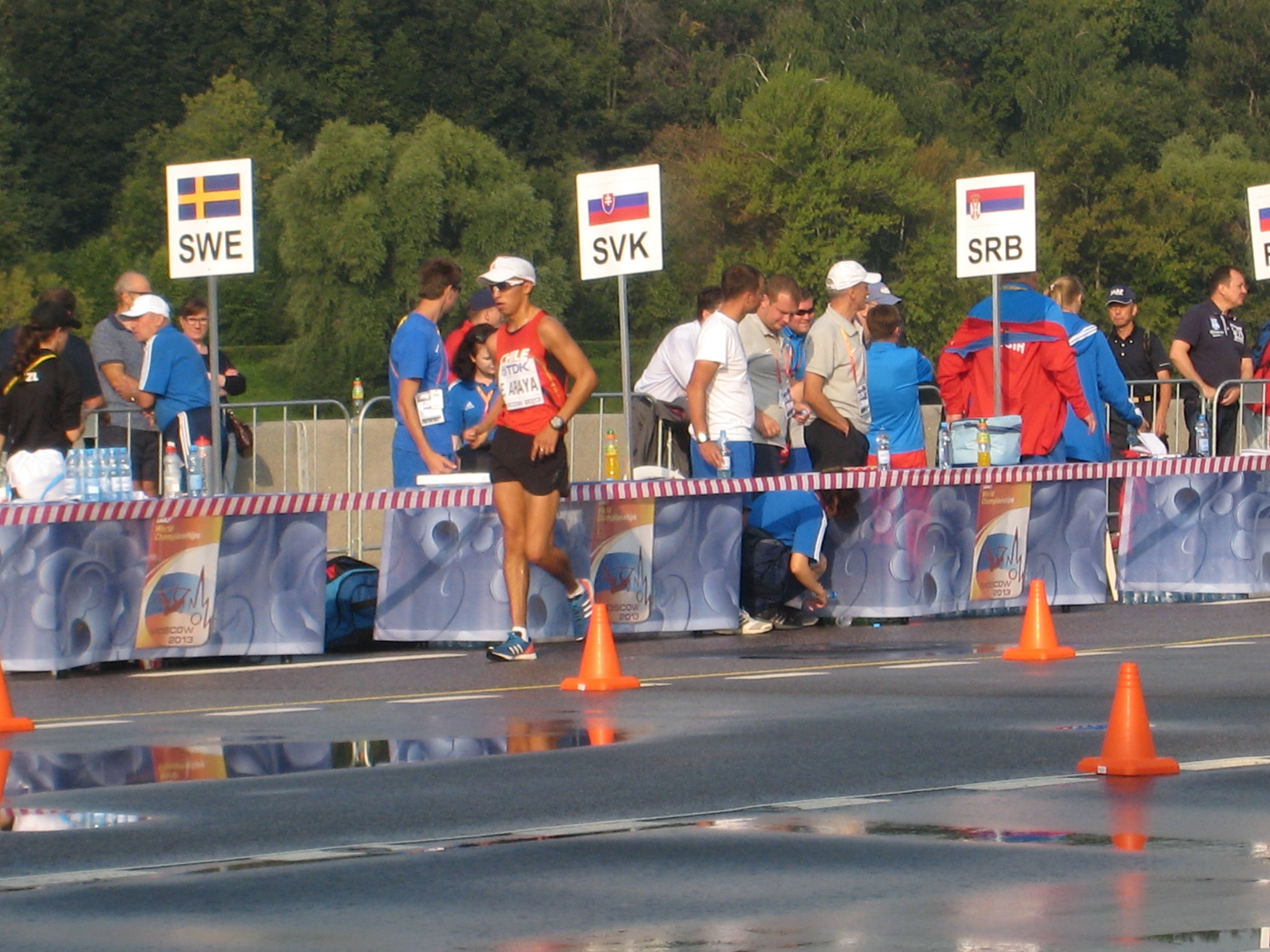
- 2013 World Championships in Moscow

Personal information
- Full name: Edward Ignacio Araya Cortés
- Born: 14 February 1986 (age 40) Antofagasta, Chile
- Height: 1.76 m (5 ft 9 in)
- Weight: 61 kg (134 lb)

Sport
- Country: Chile
- Sport: Athletics
- Event: Race walking
- Updated on 13 May 2015

Edward Ignacio Araya Cortés (born 14 February 1986) is a Chilean race walker. He competed in the 50 kilometres walk event at the 2012 Summer Olympics. His personal best of 3:58:54 hours for the 50 kilometres walk is the Chilean record for the event. He represented his country at the 2013 World Championships in Athletics and has twice competed at the IAAF World Race Walking Cup (2010 and 2012). He entered the 2011 Pan American Games but was disqualified in the competition. He has raced at the South American Race Walking Championships on four occasions (2004, 2004, 2008, 2010) but has not won a medal there.

He has a twin brother, Yerko, who is also a race walker.

== Competition record ==
Year	Competition	Venue	Position	Event	Notes
Representing Chile
2002	South American Race Walking Cup (U18)	Puerto Saavedra, Chile	8th	10 km	50:58
2002	South American Race Walking Cup (U18)	Puerto Saavedra, Chile	1st	Team (20 km)	15 pts
2003	World Youth Championships	Sherbrooke, Canada	18th	10,000m track walk	49:16.92
2004	South American Race Walking Championships (U20)	Los Ángeles, Chile	–	10 km	DQ
2004	South American Race Walking Championships (U20)	Los Ángeles, Chile	1st	Team (10 km)	12 pts
2005	Pan American Race Walking Cup (U20)	Lima, Peru	10th	10 km	44:51
2008	South American Race Walking Championships	Cuenca, Ecuador	12th	20 km	1:39:11 A
2008	South American Race Walking Championships	Cuenca, Ecuador	3rd	Team (20 km)	37 pts
2008	South American U23 Championships	Lima, Peru	—	20,000m walk	DQ
2010	South American Race Walking Championships	Cochabamba, Bolivia	–	20 km	DQ
2010	World Race Walking Cup	Chihuahua, Mexico	58th	20 km	1:34:47
2011	Pan American Race Walking Cup	Envigado, Colombia	–	20 km	DQ
2011	South American Championships	Buenos Aires, Argentina	–	20,000m track walk	DQ
2011	Pan American Games	Guadalajara, Mexico	–	50 km	DQ
2012	World Race Walking Cup	Saransk, Russia	50th	20 km	1:26:14
2012	Olympic Games	London, United Kingdom	–	50 km	DQ
2013	World Championships	Moscow, Russia	–	50 km	DQ
2014	South American Games	Santiago, Chile	–	20,000m track walk	DQ
2015	Pan American Race Walking Cup	Arica, Chile	—	20 km	DQ
2015	Pan American Race Walking Cup	Arica, Chile	8th	Team (20 km)	85 pts
