= Fredy Hernández =

Colombian race walker (born 1978)

Personal information
- Full name: Fredy Hernando Hernández Camacho
- Born: April 25, 1978 (age 48)
- Height: 1.70 m (5 ft 7 in)
- Weight: 59 kg (130 lb)

Sport
- Country: Colombia
- Sport: Athletics
- Event: 50km Race Walk
Medal record
Men's Racewalking
Representing Colombia
Central American and Caribbean Games
Bronze medal – third place	2002 San Salvador	20 km

Fredy Hernando Hernández Camacho (born April 25, 1978, in Bogotá) is a male race walker from Colombia. He twice competed for his native country at the Pan American Games (2003 and 2007). He also competed for Colombia at the 2012 Summer Olympics.

== Personal bests ==
Event	Result	Venue	Date
Road walk
20 km	1:22:28 hrs	(Spain) A Coruña	19 Jun 2010
50 km	3:56:00 hrs	(United Kingdom) London	11 Aug 2012
Track walk
10,000 m	43:33.69 min	(Colombia) Bogotá	13 Aug 2006
20,000 m	1:24:39.4 hrs (ht)	(Colombia) Cali	16 May 2010

== Achievements ==
Year	Competition	Venue	Position	Event	Notes
Representing Colombia
1996	South American Junior Championships	Bucaramanga, Colombia	5th	10,000m walk	47:25.40
1997	South American Race Walking Cup (U20)	Bogotá, Colombia	4th	10 km	48:04
1997	South American Junior Championships	San Carlos, Uruguay	–	10,000m walk	DQ
2002	South American Race Walking Cup	Puerto Saavedra, Chile	4th	20 km	1:25:49
2002	World Race Walking Cup	Turin, Italy	25th	20 km	1:27:23
2002	Central American and Caribbean Games	San Salvador, El Salvador	3rd	20 km	1:28:48
2003	Pan American Race Walking Cup	Chula Vista, California, United States	–	20 km	DQ
2003	South American Championships	Barquisimeto, Venezuela	2nd	20,000m walk	1:25:59.91
2003	Pan American Games	Santo Domingo, Dominican Republic	5th	20 km	1:28:07
2004	South American Race Walking Championships	Los Ángeles, Bío Bío, Chile	3rd	20 km	1:23:08
2004	South American Race Walking Championships	Los Ángeles, Bío Bío, Chile	1st	Team (20 km)	9 pts
2004	World Race Walking Cup	Naumburg, Germany	35th	20 km	1:23:35
2004	World Race Walking Cup	Naumburg, Germany	12th	Team (20 km)	121 pts
2005	South American Championships	Cali, Colombia	–	20,000m walk	DQ
2006	South American Race Walking Championships	Cochabamba, Bolivia	4th	20 km	1:28:31
2006	South American Race Walking Championships	Cochabamba, Bolivia	1st	Team (20 km)	9 pts
2006	World Race Walking Cup	A Coruña, Spain	76th	20 km	1:32:38
2006	World Race Walking Cup	A Coruña, Spain	11th	Team (20 km)	130 pts
2007	Pan American Race Walking Cup	Balneário Camboriú, Brazil	2nd	50 km	4:05:16
2007	Pan American Games	Rio de Janeiro, Brazil	6th	50 km	4:03:10
2007	World Championships	Osaka, Japan	–	50 km	DNF
2009	Pan American Race Walking Cup	San Salvador, El Salvador	8th	50 km	4:21:30
2009	Pan American Race Walking Cup	San Salvador, El Salvador	1st	Team (50 km)	15 pts
2011	Pan American Race Walking Cup	Envigado, Colombia	2nd	50 km	3:59:40
2011	Pan American Race Walking Cup	Envigado, Colombia	1st	Team (50 km)	11 pts
2011	Pan American Games	Guadalajara, Mexico	4th	50 km	4:00:12 A
2012	World Race Walking Cup	Saransk, Russia	28th	50 km	4:00:22
2012	Olympic Games	London, Great Britain	33rd	50 km	3:56:00
2013	World Championships	Moscow, Russia	–	50 km	DNF
2015	Pan American Race Walking Cup	Arica, Chile	10th	50 km	4:02:46
