= Xavier Moreno =

Ecuadorian racewalker (born 1979)

Personal information
- Full name: Édison Xavier Moreno Cruz
- Born: November 15, 1979 (age 46) Quito, Ecuador
- Height: 1.68 m (5 ft 6 in)
- Weight: 52 kg (115 lb)

Sport
- Country: Ecuador
- Sport: Men's Athletics
- Event: Racewalking

Achievements and titles
- Olympic finals: 2008 Summer Olympics
Medal record
Men's Racewalking
Representing Ecuador
Pan American Games
Gold medal – first place	2007 Rio de Janeiro	50 km
Bolivarian Games
Gold medal – first place	2005 Armenia	50 km
- Updated on 17 May 2015

Édison Xavier Moreno Cruz (born 15 November 1979) is an Ecuadorian racewalker who competed in the 2004 Summer Olympics, 2008 Summer Olympics and 2012 Summer Olympics.

== Personal best ==
Event	Result	Venue	Date
Road walk
10 km	41:09 min	(Spain) A Coruña	16 May 1998
20 km	1:22:24 hrs	(Germany) Naumburg	2 May 2004
35 km	2:54:32 hrs	(Ecuador) Salinas	12 Feb 2012
50 km	3:52:07 hrs	(Brazil) Rio de Janeiro	28 Jul 2007
Track walk
5000 m	19:46.37 min	(United States) San Diego, California	7 Jun 2003
10,000 m	43:52.61 min	(France) Annecy	30 Jul 1998
20,000 m	1:23:47.7 hrs (ht)	(United States) Los Angeles, California	27 Jun 2004

== Achievements ==
Year	Competition	Venue	Position	Event	Notes
Representing Ecuador
1998	South American Race Walking Cup (U20)	Bogotá, Colombia	1st	10 km	44:50 min
1998	World Junior Championships	Annecy, France	8th	10,000m walk	43:52.61 min
1998	Pan American Race Walking Cup	Miami, Florida, United States	–	20 km	DNF
1999	South American Championships	Bogotá, Colombia	–	20,000m walk	DNF
2000	Pan American Race Walking Cup	Poza Rica, Veracruz, México	–	20 km	DNF
2001	South American Championships	Manaus, Brazil	3rd	20,000m walk	1:35:42.11 hrs
2001	Pan American Race Walking Cup	Cuenca, Ecuador	–	50 km	DQ
2002	South American Race Walking Cup	Puerto Saavedra, Chile	5th	20 km	1:28:53
2002	South American Race Walking Cup	Puerto Saavedra, Chile	1st	Team (20 km)	18 pts
2002	World Race Walking Cup	Turin, Italy	40th	20 km	1:29:54 hrs
2002	World Race Walking Cup	Turin, Italy	4th	Team (20 km)	61 pts
2003	Pan American Race Walking Cup	Chula Vista, California, United States	12th	20 km	1:28:05
2003	Pan American Race Walking Cup	Chula Vista, California, United States	2nd	Team (20 km)	13 pts
2004	South American Race Walking Cup	Los Ángeles, Chile	6th	20 km	1:24:50 hrs
2004	South American Race Walking Cup	Los Ángeles, Chile	2nd	Team (20 km)	12 pts
2004	World Race Walking Cup	Naumburg, Germany	22nd	20 km	1:22:24 hrs PB
2004	World Race Walking Cup	Naumburg, Germany	2nd	Team (20 km)	35 pts
2004	Olympic Games	Athens, Greece	–	20 km	DQ
2005	Pan American Race Walking Cup	Lima, Peru	5th	50 km	4:05:38 hrs A
2005	Bolivarian Games	Armenia, Colombia	1st	50 km	4:09:07 hrs GR A
2006	South American Race Walking Cup	Cochabamba, Bolivia	5th	20 km	1:29:31 hrs A
2006	South American Race Walking Cup	Cochabamba, Bolivia	2nd	Team (20 km)	12 pts
2006	World Race Walking Cup	A Coruña, Spain	59th	20 km	1:27:57 hrs
2006	World Race Walking Cup	A Coruña, Spain	7th	Team (20 km)	68 pts
2006	South American Championships	Tunja, Colombia	2nd	20,000m walk	1:29:50.2 hrs
2007	ALBA Games	Caracas, Venezuela	2nd	20,000m walk	1:30:32 hrs
2007	Pan American Games	Rio de Janeiro, Brazil	1st	50 km	3:52.07 hrs AR PB
2007	Universiade	Bangkok, Thailand	18th	20 km	1:34:01 min
2008	World Race Walking Cup	Cheboksary, Russia	–	50 km	DNF
2008	World Race Walking Cup	Cheboksary, Russia	9th	Team (50 km)	130 pts
2008	Olympic Games	Beijing, China	36th	50 km	4:07:04 hrs
2012	World Race Walking Cup	Saransk, Russia	–	50 km	DNF
2012	Olympic Games	London, United Kingdom	47th	50 km	4:09:23 hrs
2013	Pan American Race Walking Cup	Guatemala City, Guatemala	9th	50 km	4:11:09 A
2015	Pan American Race Walking Cup	Arica, Chile	21st	20 km	1:29:23
2015	Pan American Race Walking Cup	Arica, Chile	4th	Team (20 km)	42 pts
