= Manuel Esteban Soto =

Colombian racewalker

Personal information
- Full name: Manuel Esteban Soto Ruiz
- Nationality: Colombian
- Born: January 28, 1994 (age 32) Pitalito, Colombia
- Height: 1.70 m (5 ft 7 in)
- Weight: 62 kg (137 lb)

Sport
- Sport: Athletics
- Event: Race walking

Achievements and titles
- Personal best: 20 km walk: 1:20:36 (2016)
Medal record
Representing Colombia
Men's athletics
Event	1st	2nd	3rd
World Team Championships (U20)	0	1	0
CAC Games	0	1	0
Bolivarian Games	1	0	1
South American U23 Championships	1	0	0
Total	2	2	1
Central American and Caribbean Games
Silver medal – second place	2018 Barranquilla	20 km walk
Bolivarian Games
Gold medal – first place	2017 Santa Marta	20 km walk
Bronze medal – third place	2022 Valledupar	20 km walk
World Team Championships (U20)
Silver medal – second place	2012 Saransk	10 km walk (team)
South American U23 Championships
Gold medal – first place	2014 Montevideo	20,000 m walk

Manuel Esteban Soto Ruiz (born 28 January 1994) is a Colombian male race walking athlete who competes in the 20 kilometres race walk. He represented his country at the 2016 Summer Olympics and the 2012 IAAF World Race Walking Cup.

He failed to finish in his international debut at the 2011 World Youth Championships in Athletics but took a bronze medal at the South American Race Walking Championships in 2012. A succession of age category gold medals followed at the 2013 South American Junior Championships in Athletics, the 2013 Pan American Race Walking Cup and the 2014 South American Under-23 Championships in Athletics.

He made his senior debut at the 2015 Pan American Race Walking Cup, sharing in the team silver medal. He gained selection for Colombia at the 2016 Summer Olympics and finished with a personal best of 1:20:36 minutes for the 20 km walk in ninth place.

He placed 14th in the Men's 20 kilometres walk at the 2020 Summer Olympics in Tokyo.

In 2018, Soto was issued with a 2-month and 1-week competition ban for an anti-doping rule violation after testing positive for isometheptene.

== Personal bests ==
- 10,000 metres race walk – 41:55.95 (2013)
- 10 kilometres race walk – 41:19 (2013)
- 20,000 metres race walk – 1:23:22.7 (2014)
- 20 kilometres race walk – 1:20:36 (2016)

All information from All-Athletics.

== International competitions ==
Year	Competition	Venue	Position	Event	Notes
2011	World U18 Championships	Villeneuve-d'Ascq, France	—N/a	10,000 m walk	DQ
2012	South American Race Walking Championships	Salinas, Ecuador	3rd	10 km walk (junior)	43:43
2012	South American Race Walking Championships	Salinas, Ecuador	1st	Junior team	3 pts
2012	World Race Walking Cup	Saransk, Russia	39th	10 km walk (junior)	45:24
2012	World Race Walking Cup	Saransk, Russia	2nd	Junior team	10 pts
2013	South American Junior Championships	Resistencia, Argentina	1st	10 km walk	41:55.95
2013	Pan American Race Walking Cup	Guatemala City, Guatemala	1st	10 km walk	41:18.6
2013	Pan American Race Walking Cup	Guatemala City, Guatemala	1st	Junior team	7 pts
2014	South American U23 Championships	Montevideo, Uruguay	1st	20,000 m walk	1:23:22.7 CR
2015	Pan American Race Walking Cup	Arica, Chile	14th	20 km walk	1:26:27
2015	Pan American Race Walking Cup	Arica, Chile	2nd	Team	23 pts
2016	Olympic Games	Rio de Janeiro, Brazil	9th	20 km walk	1:20:36
2017	Bolivarian Games	Santa Marta, Colombia	1st	20 km walk	1:26:32
