= Arabelly Orjuela =

Colombian race walker (born 1988)

Personal information
- Full name: Arabelly Orjuela Sánchez
- Born: 24 July 1988 (age 37) Líbano, Tolima, Colombia
- Height: 1.50 m (4 ft 11 in)
- Weight: 43 kg (95 lb)

Sport
- Country: Colombia
- Sport: Athletics
- Event: Race walking
Medal record
Representing Colombia
Women's athletics
Event	1st	2nd	3rd
World Team Championships	0	0	1
Pan American Cup	1	2	1
Ibero-American Championships	1	0	0
South American Games	0	1	0
South American Championships	0	1	1
South American Race Walking Championships	2	0	0
Bolivarian Games	0	1	0
Total	4	5	3
World Team Championships
Bronze medal – third place	2016 Rome	20 km walk (team)
Pan American Cup
Gold medal – first place	2011 Envigado	20 km walk (team)
Silver medal – second place	2011 Envigado	20 km walk
Silver medal – second place	2013 Guatemala City	20 km walk (team)
Bronze medal – third place	2023 Managua	35 km walk
Ibero-American Championships
Gold medal – first place	2012 Barquisimeto	10,000 m walk
South American Games
Silver medal – second place	2010 Medellín	20,000 m walk
South American Championships
Silver medal – second place	2013 Cartagena	20,000 m walk
Bronze medal – third place	2011 Buenos Aires	20,000 m walk
South American Race Walking Championships
Gold medal – first place	2012 Salinas	20 km walk
Gold medal – first place	2012 Salinas	20 km walk (team)
Bolivarian Games
Silver medal – second place	2022 Valledupar	35 km walk
- Updated on 15 April 2026

Arabelly Orjuela Sánchez (born 24 July 1988) is a Colombian race walker. She competed in the 20 km kilometres event at the 2012 Summer Olympics.

== Personal bests ==
=== Track walk ===
- 10,000 m: 46:21.88 min – Barquisimeto, Venezuela, 9 June 2012
- 20,000 m: 1:32:48.7 hrs (ht) – Buenos Aires, Argentina, 5 June 2011

=== Road walk ===
- 20 km: 1:32:40 hrs – Lima, Peru, 13 May 2017

== Achievements ==
Year	Competition	Venue	Position	Event	Notes
Representing the Colombia
2010	South American Under-23 Championships / South American Games	Medellín, Colombia	2nd	20,000 m track walk	1:45:29.4
2010	Ibero-American Championships	San Fernando, Spain	6th	10,000 m walk	47:34.21
2011	Pan American Race Walking Cup	Envigado, Colombia	2nd	20 km road walk	1:36:12
2011	South American Championships	Buenos Aires, Argentina	3rd	20,000 m track walk	1:32:48.7
2011	World Championships	Daegu, South Korea	31st	20 km road walk	1:39:28
2011	Pan American Games	Guadalajara, Mexico	6th	20 km road walk	1:36:50
2012	South American Race Walking Championships	Salinas, Ecuador	1st	20 km road walk	1:34:40.2
2012	World Race Walking Cup	Saransk, Russia	30th	20 km road walk	1:36:14
2012	Ibero-American Championships	Barquisimeto, Venezuela	1st	10,000 m track walk	46:21.88
2012	Olympic Games	London, United Kingdom	43rd	20 km road walk	1:35:05
2013	Pan American Race Walking Cup	Guatemala City, Guatemala	—	20 km road walk	DQ
2013	South American Championships	Cartagena, Colombia	2nd	20,000 m track walk	1:38:59.78
2014	South American Race Walking Championships	Cochabamba, Bolivia	8th	20 km road walk	1:41:51
2017	South American Championships	Asunción, Paraguay	–	20,000 m track walk	DQ
2018	South American Games	Cochabamba, Bolivia	5th	20,000 m track walk	1:39:29
2019	South American Championships	Lima, Peru	5th	20,000 m track walk	1:35:33.00
2022	Bolivarian Games	Valledupar, Colombia	2nd	35 km road walk	3:00:15
2022	South American Games	Asunción, Paraguay	6th	35 km road walk	3:02:55
