= Claudia Balderrama =

Bolivian race walker

Personal information
- Full name: Claudia Balderrama Ibañez
- Born: 13 November 1983 (age 42) Catavi, Llallagua, Potosí, Bolivia
- Height: 1.60 m (5 ft 3 in)
- Weight: 56 kg (123 lb)

Sport
- Country: Bolivia
- Sport: Athletics
- Event: 20 km race walk
- Updated on 20 May 2014

Claudia Balderrama Ibañez (born 13 November 1983) is a Bolivian race walker of partial Aymara ancestry. She was born in Catavi, Llallagua, Potosí, and competed for Bolivia at the 2012 Summer Olympics, finishing 33rd in a new personal best of 1:33:28.

== Personal bests ==
=== Road walk ===
- 20 km walk: 1:33:28 hrs – London, United Kingdom, 11 August 2012

== Achievements ==
Year	Competition	Venue	Position	Event	Notes
Representing Bolivia
2006	South American Race Walking Championships	Cochabamba, Bolivia	—	20 km road walk	DQ/DNF
2010	South American Race Walking Championships	Cochabamba, Bolivia	2nd	20 km	1:42:48 hrs A
2010	World Race Walking Cup	Chihuahua, Mexico	35th	20 km	1:43:40 hrs A
2011	Pan American Race Walking Cup	Envigado, Colombia	10th	20 km	1:39:41 hrs
2011	ALBA Games	Barquisimeto, Venezuela	1st	20 km	1:39:06.6 hrs
2011	World Championships	Daegu, South Korea	–	20 km	DQ
2011	Pan American Games	Guadalajara, Mexico	7th	20 km	1:37:32 hrs A
2012	South American Race Walking Championships	Salinas, Ecuador	4th	20 km road walk	1:36:45.8
2012	World Race Walking Cup	Saransk, Mordovia, Russia	29th	20 km	1:35:54 hrs
2012	Olympic Games	London, United Kingdom	33rd	20 km	1:33:28 hrs
2014	South American Race Walking Championships	Cochabamba, Bolivia	2nd	20 km road walk	1:36:25
2014	South American Games	Santiago, Chile	—	20,000 m track walk	DQ
2014	World Race Walking Cup	Taicang, China	68th	20 km road walk	1:38:10
2015	World Championships	Beijing, China	—	20 km walk	DQ
