= Gianetti Bonfim =

Brazilian racewalker (born 1965)

Medal record

Women's athletics

Representing Brazil

South American Championships
Silver medal – second place	2001 Manaus	20 km walk
Bronze medal – third place	2005 Cali	20 km walk

Gianetti Oliveira de Sena Bonfim (born 13 March 1965) is a Brazilian female former racewalking athlete who competed in the 20 kilometres race walk. Her best time for that distance was 1:41:07 hours. She was twice a medallist at the South American Championships in Athletics. She was a seven-time national champion at the Troféu Brasil de Atletismo, winning consecutively from 1996 to 2002.

Bonfim was a three-time competitor at the IAAF World Race Walking Cup, being part of the Brazilian teams in 1999, 2002 and 2004. Her best finish was 62nd. She was the 10,000 m walk gold medallist at the 1996 Ibero-American Championships in Athletics – being the first Brazilian to win a walking title at the competition.

Her son, Caio Bonfim, is also an international racewalker for Brazil.

== International competitions ==
Year	Competition	Venue	Position	Event	Notes
1996	Ibero-American Championships	Medellín, Colombia	1st	10,000 m walk	48:15.67
1996	Pan American Race Walking Cup	Manaus, Brazil	10th	20 km walk	53:09
1996	Pan American Race Walking Cup	Manaus, Brazil	4th	Team	19 pts
1997	South American Championships	Mar del Plata, Argentina	6th	10,000 m walk	48:25.83
1998	Ibero-American Championships	Lisbon, Portugal	9th	10,000 m walk	50:52.71
1998	Pan American Race Walking Cup	Miami, United States	14th	20 km walk	1:51:45
1999	IAAF World Race Walking Cup	Mézidon-Canon, France	73rd	20 km walk	1:42:26
1999	South American Championships	Bogotá, Colombia	4th	20,000 m walk	1:46:59.4
2000	Ibero-American Championships	Rio de Janeiro, Brazil	5th	10,000 m walk	49:47.01
2000	Pan American Race Walking Cup	Poza Rica, Mexico	15th	20 km walk	1:52:22
2001	South American Championships	Manaus, Brazil	2nd	20 km walk	1:46:02.1
2001	South American Race Walking Championships	Cuenca, Ecuador	3rd	20 km walk	1:46:55
2001	Pan American Race Walking Cup	Cuenca, Ecuador	8th	20 km walk	1:46:55
2002	IAAF World Race Walking Cup	Turin, Italy	—	20 km walk	DNF
2002	Ibero-American Championships	Guatemala City, Guatemala	5th	20,000 m walk	1:42:43
2002	South American Race Walking Championships	Puerto Saavedra, Chile	2nd	20 km walk	1:42:23
2002	South American Race Walking Championships	Puerto Saavedra, Chile	1st	Team	12 pts
2003	South American Championships	Barquisimeto, Venezuela	5th	20 km walk	1:59:47.60
2004	IAAF World Race Walking Cup	Naumburg, Germany	62nd	20 km walk	1:41:07
2004	IAAF World Race Walking Cup	Naumburg, Germany	14th	Team	188 pts
2004	South American Race Walking Championships	Los Ángeles, Chile	9th	20 km walk	1:43:38
2004	South American Race Walking Championships	Los Ángeles, Chile	1st	Team	21 pts
2005	South American Championships	Cali, Colombia	3rd	20 km walk	1:48:16
2006	Ibero-American Championships	Ponce, Puerto Rico	7th	10,000 m walk	55:19.87

== National titles ==
- Troféu Brasil de Atletismo
  - 10 km walk: 1996, 1997, 1998
  - 20 km walk: 1999, 2000, 2001, 2002
