= Yadira Guamán =

Ecuadorian racewalker (born 1986)

Personal information
- Full name: Yadira Alexandra Guamán Maza
- Born: 8 June 1986 (age 40) Cumbaratza, Zamora Chinchipe, Ecuador
- Height: 1.58 m (5 ft 2 in)
- Weight: 52 kg (115 lb)

Sport
- Country: Ecuador
- Sport: Athletics
- Event: 20km Race Walk
- Updated on 20 May 2014

Yadira Alexandra Guamán Maza (born 8 June 1986 in Cumbaratza, Zamora Chinchipe) is a female race walker and South American Games gold medalist from Ecuador.

== Personal bests ==
=== Track walk ===
- 10,000 m: 47:06.40 min – (Ecuador) Guayaquil, 5 July 2014
- 20,000 m: 1:33:18.0 hrs (ht) – (Argentina) Buenos Aires, 5 June 2011

=== Road walk ===
- 10 km: 49:00 min – (Cuba) Havana, 24 April 2009
- 20 km: 1:34:47 hrs – (United Kingdom) London, 11 August 2012

== Achievements ==
Year	Competition	Venue	Position	Event	Notes
Representing the Ecuador
2004	World Race Walking Cup	Naumburg, Germany	—	10 km	DQ
2004	World Race Walking Cup	Naumburg, Germany	8th	Team (10 km Junior)	43 pts
2004	World Junior Championships	Grosseto, Italy	24th	10,000m	52:07.82
2005	Pan American Race Walking Cup	Lima, Peru	7th	10 km	49:36
2005	Pan American Race Walking Cup	Lima, Peru	1st	Team (10 km Junior)	10 pts
2006	South American Race Walking Championships	Cochabamba, Bolivia	4th	20 km	1:46:23
2006	South American Race Walking Championships	Cochabamba, Bolivia	1st	Team (20 km)	16 pts
2006	World Race Walking Cup	A Coruña, Spain	36th	20 km	1:36:22
2006	World Race Walking Cup	A Coruña, Spain	11th	Team (20 km)	120 pts
2006	South American Championships	Tunja, Colombia	1st	20,000m	1:46:06.7
2006	South American Under-23 Championships / South American Games	Buenos Aires, Argentina	1st	20,000m	1:39:53.1
2007	Pan American Race Walking Cup	Balneário Camboriú, Brazil	3rd	20 km	1:41:08
2007	Pan American Race Walking Cup	Balneário Camboriú, Brazil	2nd	Team (20 km)	22 pts
2007	Pan American Games	Rio de Janeiro, Brazil	7th	20 km	1:46:06
2007	World Championships	Osaka, Japan	29th	20 km	1:42:17
2008	South American Race Walking Championships	Cuenca, Ecuador	6th	20 km	1:44:39
2008	South American Race Walking Championships	Cuenca, Ecuador	1st	Team (20 km)	9 pts
2008	World Race Walking Cup	Cheboksary, Russia	73rd	20 km	1:48:12
2008	World Race Walking Cup	Cheboksary, Russia	14th	Team (20 km)	186 pts
2009	ALBA Games	Havana, Cuba	4th	10,000m	49:00
2010	South American Race Walking Championships	Cochabamba, Bolivia	5th	20 km	1:44:29
2010	South American Race Walking Championships	Cochabamba, Bolivia	2nd	Team (20 km)	19 pts
2010	World Race Walking Cup	Chihuahua, Mexico	25th	20 km	1:40:19
2010	World Race Walking Cup	Chihuahua, Mexico	7th	Team (20 km)	106 pts
2011	Pan American Race Walking Cup	Envigado, Colombia	15th	20 km	1:44:10
2011	Pan American Race Walking Cup	Envigado, Colombia	3rd	Team (20 km)	36 pts
2011	South American Championships	Buenos Aires, Argentina	4th	20,000m	1:33:18.0
2011	World Championships	Daegu, South Korea	38th	20 km	1:45:15
2011	Pan American Games	Guadalajara, Mexico	8th	20 km	1:38:42
2012	South American Race Walking Championships	Salinas, Ecuador	5th	20 km	1:38:19.4
2012	South American Race Walking Championships	Salinas, Ecuador	2nd	Team (20 km)	20 pts
2012	World Race Walking Cup	Saransk, Russia	58th	20 km	1:41:31
2012	World Race Walking Cup	Saransk, Russia	12th	Team (20 km)	158 pts
2012	Olympic Games	London, United Kingdom	40th	20 km	1:34:47
2013	Pan American Race Walking Cup	Guatemala City, Guatemala	—	20 km	DNF
2013	Pan American Race Walking Cup	Guatemala City, Guatemala	3rd	Team (20 km)	42 pts
2014	World Race Walking Cup	Taicang, China	74th	20 km	1:41:47
2014	World Race Walking Cup	Taicang, China	13th	Team (20 km)	186 pts
2015	Pan American Race Walking Cup	Arica, Chile	26th	20 km	1:47:51
2015	Pan American Race Walking Cup	Arica, Chile	5th	Team (20 km)	51 pts
