= Jonathan Rieckmann =

Brazilian racewalker

Personal information
- Born: 20 August 1987 (age 38) Blumenau, Brazil

Sport
- Sport: Track and field

Jonathan Rieckmann (born August 20, 1987) is a Brazilian racewalker. He placed 29th in the men's 50 kilometres walk at the 2016 Summer Olympics.
