= Magaly Bonilla =

Ecuadorian race walker (born 1992)

Personal information
- Full name: Magaly Beatriz Bonilla Solís
- Born: 8 February 1992 (age 34)
- Height: 1.56 m (5 ft 1 in)
- Weight: 52 kg (115 lb)

Sport
- Country: Ecuador
- Sport: Athletics
- Event: Race walking
Medal record
Representing Ecuador
Women's athletics
World Team Championships
Gold medal – first place	2022 Muscat	35 km walk (team)
Gold medal – first place	2026 Brasília	Marathon walk (team)
Silver medal – second place	2018 Taicang	50 km walk (team)
Pan American Cup
Bronze medal – third place	2019 Lázaro Cárdenas	50 km walk
South American Race Walking Championships
Gold medal – first place	2018 Sucúa	50 km walk
Silver medal – second place	2022 Lima	35 km walk
Silver medal – second place	2024 Recife	20 km walk
Bolivarian Games
Gold medal – first place	2022 Valledupar	35 km walk
Bronze medal – third place	2025 Lima-Ayacucho	Half marathon walk
Pan American U20 Championships
Silver medal – second place	2011 Miramar	10,000 m walk

Magaly Beatriz Bonilla Solís (born 8 February 1992) is an Ecuadorian race walker. She competed in the women's 20 kilometres walk event at the 2016 Summer Olympics.
