= Marco Antonio Rodríguez (race walker) =

Bolivian racewalker

Personal information
- Full name: Marco Antonio Rodríguez Pardo
- Born: 24 January 1994 (age 32)

Sport
- Country: Bolivia
- Sport: Track and field
- Event: racewalking
- Updated on 29 August 2015

Marco Antonio Rodríguez Pardo (born 24 January 1994) is a male Bolivian racewalker. He competed in the 20 kilometres walk event at the 2015 World Championships in Athletics in Beijing, China.

== See also ==
- Bolivia at the 2015 World Championships in Athletics
