= Sandra Zapata =

Colombian racewalker

Personal information
- Full name: Sandra Patricia Zapata Pórtela
- Nationality: Colombia
- Born: 3 February 1977 (age 49) La Argentina, Huila, Colombia
- Height: 1.60 m (5 ft 3 in)
- Weight: 53 kg (117 lb)

Sport
- Country: Colombia
- Sport: Athletics
- Event: Racewalking
- Coached by: Olga Beatriz Ladino Romero

Achievements and titles
- Personal best: 20 km walk: 1:33:22 (2008)
Medal record
Representing Colombia
Central American and Caribbean Games
Bronze medal – third place	2006 Cartagena	20km walk

Sandra Patricia Zapata Pórtela (born February 3, 1977, in La Argentina, Huila) is a female Colombian race walker. In 2008, Zapata had won a gold medal in the 20 km at the South American Race Walking Championships in Cuenca, Ecuador, and also, set both a national record and a personal best time of 1:33:22 at the IAAF World Race Walking Cup in Cheboksary, Russia.

Zapata made her official debut for the 2004 Summer Olympics in Athens, where she placed forty-sixth in the women's 20 km race walk, with a time of 1:42:22.

At the 2008 Summer Olympics in Beijing, Zapata competed for the second time in the 20 km race walk. She finished the race in thirty-fourth place by eight seconds ahead of Ecuador's Johana Ordóñez, with a time of 1:36:18.

== Achievements ==
Year	Competition	Venue	Position	Event	Notes
Representing Colombia
1998	Central American and Caribbean Games	Maracaibo, Venezuela	6th	10,000 m walk	48:42.75
2002	Central American and Caribbean Games	San Salvador, El Salvador	4th	20 km walk	1:44:00
