= Wendy Cornejo =

Bolivian racewalker

Personal information
- Born: 7 January 1993 (age 33)

Sport
- Country: Bolivia
- Sport: Track and field
- Updated on 29 August 2015

Wendy Cornejo (born 7 January 1993) is a female racewalker from Bolivia. She competed in the Women's 20 kilometres walk event at the 2015 World Championships in Athletics in Beijing, China.

== See also ==
- Bolivia at the 2015 World Championships in Athletics
