= Ronald Quispe =

Bolivian racewalker

Personal information
- Born: 5 March 1988 (age 38) Achacachi, La Paz, Bolivia

Sport
- Sport: Race walking
Medal record
Representing Bolivia
South American Games
| Bronze medal – third place | 2018 Cochabamba | 50 km walk |

Ronald Rey Quispe Misme (born 5 March 1988) is a Bolivian race-walker competing for Bolivia at the 2016 Summer Olympics in the men's 50 km walk event. He finished in 30th place with a time of 4:02:00.
