= Gustavo Restrepo (race walker) =

Colombian race walker

Personal information
- Full name: Gustavo Adolfo Restrepo Baena
- Born: July 27, 1982 (age 44) Yumbo, Valle del Cauca, Colombia

Sport
- Country: Colombia
- Sport: Men's Athletics
- Event: Racewalking
- Retired: 2011
Medal record
Men's Racewalking
Representing Colombia
Pan American Games
Bronze medal – third place	2007 Rio de Janeiro	20km walk
Central American and Caribbean Games
Bronze medal – third place	2010 Mayaguez	20km walk
Bolivarian Games
Bronze medal – third place	2005 Armenia	20km walk

Gustavo Adolfo Restrepo Baena (born 27 July 1982) is a Colombian race walker.

== Achievements ==
Year	Competition	Venue	Position	Event	Notes
Representing Colombia
2004	South American U23 Championships	Barquisimeto, Venezuela	1st	20,000m walk	1:26:59.60
2005	Bolivarian Games	Armenia, Colombia	3rd	20 km	1:24:54 A
2006	World Race Walking Cup	A Coruña, Spain	19th	20 km	1:22:18 SB
2006	South American Championships	Tunja, Colombia	1st	20 km	1:28:12.0
2007	Pan American Race Walking Cup	Balneário Camboriú, Brazil	2nd	20 km	1:25:09
2007	Pan American Games	Rio de Janeiro, Brazil	3rd	20 km	1:24:51
2007	World Championships	Osaka, Japan	—	20 km	DSQ
2010	Central American and Caribbean Games	Mayagüez, Puerto Rico	3rd	20 km	1:22:56
2011	South American Championships	Buenos Aires, Argentina	2nd	20,000 m	1:20:36.6 NR
