= Cristian Muñoz (race walker) =

Chilean race walker (born 1981)

Personal information
- Full name: Cristian Muñoz Reyes
- Nationality: Chile
- Born: February 15, 1981 (age 45) Puerto Saavedra, Chile

Sport
- Sport: Athletics
- Event: Race walking
Medal record
Men's Athletics
Representing Chile
South American Youth Championships
Silver medal – second place	1996 Asunción	5 km walk
- Updated on 11 May 2013

Cristian Muñoz Reyes (born February 15, 1981) is a Chilean race walker.

== Career ==
He twice competed for his native country at the Pan American Games (2003 and 2007). He set his personal best (1:24:26) in the men's 20 km race walk in Puerto Saavedra on September 14, 2002.

== Achievements ==
Year	Competition	Venue	Position	Event	Notes
Representing Chile
1996	South American Youth Championships	Asunción, Paraguay	-	5000 m	DNF
1996	South American Youth Championships	Asunción, Paraguay	2nd	5000 m walk	24:08.82 min
2000	World Junior Championships	Santiago, Chile	11th	10,000m walk	43:45.22
2001	South American Championships	Manaus, Brazil	4th	20,000 m walk	1:36:46.1
2001	South American Race Walking Cup	Cuenca, Ecuador	2nd	20 km walk	1:30:00 hrs
2002	South American Race Walking Cup	Puerto Saavedra, Chile	2nd	20 km walk	1:24:25.5 hrs
2002	World Race Walking Cup	Turin, Italy	18th	20 km walk	1:26:29 hrs
2003	South American Championships	Barquisimeto, Venezuela	3rd	20,000 m walk	1:31:16.10 hrs
2003	Pan American Games	Santo Domingo, Dominican Republic	6th	20 km walk	1:31:07 hrs
2003	Universiade	Daegu, South Korea	12th	20 km walk	1:29:04 hrs
2007	Pan American Games	Rio de Janeiro, Brazil	9th	50 km walk	4:24.21 hrs
