= Edwin Centeno =

Peruvian racewalker

Personal information
- Full name: Edwin Centeno Palomino
- Born: June 27, 1981 Chucuito, Puno, Perú
- Died: March 20, 2010 (aged 28) Puno, Puno Region, Perú

Sport
- Country: Peru
- Sport: Men's Athletics
- Event: Racewalking
Medal record
Men's Racewalking
Representing Peru
Bolivarian Games
Bronze medal – third place	2005 Armenia	50 km

Edwin Centeno (born June 27, 1981, in Chucuito, Puno Region, died March 20, 2010, in Puno, Puno Region) was a male race walker from Peru. He competed for his native country at the 2003 Pan American Games. He set his personal best (1:24:53) in the men's 20 km race walk in Lima on March 19, 2005.

== Achievements ==
Year	Competition	Venue	Position	Event	Notes
Representing Peru
2002	Ibero-American Championships	Guatemala City, Guatemala	11th	20,000 m	1:34:50
2003	South American Championships	Barquisimeto, Venezuela	6th	20,000 m	1:32:22.01
2003	Pan American Games	Santo Domingo, Dominican Republic	9th	20 km	1:39:16
2004	Ibero-American Championships	Huelva, Spain	9th	20,000 m	1:35:07.9
2005	World Championships	Helsinki, Finland	27th	20 km	1:26:45
2005	Bolivarian Games	Armenia, Colombia	3rd	50 km	4:13:50 A
2006	World Race Walking Cup	A Coruña, Spain	47th	50 km	4:20:22
2008	Ibero-American Championships	Iquique, Chile	10th	20,000 m	1:28:52.73
