= David Guevara =

Ecuadorian racewalker

David Guevara (born 11 February 1983 Ibarra, Ecuador) is an Ecuadorian race walker. At the Bolivarian Games in Sucre, Bolivia, he won the bronze medal. In the South American Race Walking Championships he won the silver medal in 2008 in Cuenca, Ecuador, and the bronze medal in 2010 in Cochabamba. Guerra participated in the World Race Walking Cup in Cheboksary, Russia in 2008 and in Chihuahua, Mexico in 2010.
