= Alessandra Picagevicz =

Brazilian racewalker

Personal information
- Nationality: Brazilian
- Born: 20 February 1984 (age 42)

Sport
- Sport: Athletics
- Event: Racewalking

Alessandra Picagevicz (born 20 February 1984) is a Brazilian racewalker. She competed in the women's 20 kilometres walk at the 2004 Summer Olympics.
