= Tânia Spindler =

Brazilian racewalker

Personal information
- Full name: Tânia Regina Spindler de Oliveira
- Nationality: Brazil
- Born: 10 April 1977 (age 49) Palotina, Paraná, Brazil
- Height: 1.63 m (5 ft 4 in)
- Weight: 56 kg (123 lb)

Sport
- Sport: Athletics
- Event: Race walking
- Club: Clube de Atletismo BM&F
- Coached by: Irineu de Oliveira

Achievements and titles
- Personal best: 20 km walk: 1:33:23 (2008)

Tânia Regina Spindler de Oliveira (born April 10, 1977 in Palotina, Paraná) is a female Brazilian race walker. She set both a personal best and a national record-breaking time of 1:33:23 by finishing twenty-third at the 2008 IAAF World Race Walking Cup in Cheboksary, Russia. She also claimed the nation's first ever title for the women's 20 km event at the 2009 Pan American Race Walking Cup in San Salvador, El Salvador, with a time of 1:38:53.

Spindler represented Brazil at the 2008 Summer Olympics in Beijing, where she competed for the women's 20 km race walk. Despite the tumultuous weather, she finished the race in thirty-seventh place, twenty seconds behind Ecuador's Johana Ordóñez, outside her personal best of 1:36:26.

Spindler is a full-time member of Clube de Atletismo BM&F in São Paulo, being coached and trained by her husband Irineu de Oliveira.
