= Moacir Zimmermann =

Brazilian racewalker

Personal information
- Born: 30 December 1983 (age 42) Foz do Iguaçu, Brazil

Sport
- Country: Brazil
- Sport: Athletics
Medal record
Summer Universiade
Bronze medal – third place	2009 Belgrade	20 km walk
Bronze medal – third place	2011 Shenzhen	20 km walk

Moacir Zimmermann (born 30 December 1983) is a Brazilian race walker. He competed in the men's 20 kilometres walk at the 2016 Summer Olympics. In 2019, he competed in the men's 20 kilometres walk at the 2019 World Athletics Championships held in Doha, Qatar. He finished in 39th place.
