= Fausto Quinde =

Ecuadorian race walker (born 1976)

Personal information
- Full name: Fausto Vicente Quinde Vizcaíno
- Born: February 13, 1976 (age 50) Cuenca, Ecuador

Sport
- Country: Ecuador
- Sport: Men's Athletics
- Event: Race walking

Achievements and titles
- Olympic finals: 2008 Summer Olympics
Medal record
Men's Race walking
Bolivarian Games
Representing Ecuador
Silver medal – second place	2001 Ambato	50 km
Silver medal – second place	2005 Armenia	50 km

Fausto Vicente Quinde Vizcaíno (born February 13, 1976) is an Ecuadorian race walker. He competed for his native country at the 2003 Pan American Games and the 2008 Summer Olympics.

He was the bronze medalist at the Pan American Race Walking Cup in 2007 and has represented Ecuador at the IAAF World Race Walking Cup.

== Achievements ==
Year	Competition	Venue	Position	Event	Notes
Representing Ecuador
2001	Bolivarian Games	Ambato, Ecuador	2nd	50 km	4:33:22 A
2002	Ibero-American Championships	Guatemala City, Guatemala	8th	20,000 m	1:31:24
2002	World Race Walking Cup	Turin, Italy	26th	20 km	1:27:33
2003	South American Championships	Barquisimeto, Venezuela	8th	20,000 m	1:38:30.71
2003	Pan American Games	Santo Domingo, Dominican Republic	—	20 km	DNF
2004	World Race Walking Cup	Naumburg, Germany	33rd	20 km	1:23:25
2004	Ibero-American Championships	Huelva, Spain	6th	20,000 m	1:28:34.6
2005	Bolivarian Games	Armenia, Colombia	2nd	50 km	4:10:37 A
2007	Pan American Race Walking Cup	Balneário Camboriú, Brazil	3rd	50 km	4:05:16
2008	World Race Walking Cup	Cheboksary, Russia	29th	50 km	3:59:33
2008	Olympic Games	Beijing, China	25th	50 km	3:59:28
