= 2009 Pan American Race Walking Cup =

- Organisers: Pan American Race Walking Committee
- Edition: 14th
- Date: 1–2 May
- Host city: San Salvador, El Salvador
- Venue: Boulevard del Hipódromo, Zona Rosa
- Events: 5
- Participation: 108 athletes from 15 nations
- Official website: 2009 Pan American Race Walking Cup

The 2009 Pan American Race Walking Cup was held in San Salvador, El Salvador on 1–2 May. The track of the Cup runs in the Boulevard del Hipódromo, Zona Rosa.

A detailed report was given by Javier Clavelo Robinson. Complete results were published

== Medallists ==
Event	Gold		Silver		Bronze	
Men
10 km walk (junior event)	Caio Bonfim (BRA)	43:04	Adrián Ochoa (MEX)	43:05	Julián Rendón (COL)	43:57
20 km walk	Luis Fernando López (COL)	1:22:18	James Rendón (COL)	1:23:21	Omar Segura (MEX)	1:23:49
50 km walk	Cristian Berdeja (MEX)	3:58:46	Mesías Zapata (ECU)	4:08:10	Rodrigo Moreno (COL)	4:09:31
Men (Team)
Team 10 km walk (junior event)	(Mexico) México	7 pts	Colombia	9 pts	Brazil	17 pts
Team 20 km walk	(Mexico) México	12 pts	Colombia	14 pts	El Salvador	32 pts
Team 50 km walk	Colombia	15 pts				
Women
10 km walk (junior event)	Anlly Pineda (COL)	49:50	Erandi Uribe (MEX)	50:50	Adriana Ochoa (MEX)	51:29
20 km walk	Tânia Spindler (BRA)	1:38:53	Verónica Colindres (ESA)	1:39:45	Rosario Sánchez (MEX)	1:42:12
Women (Team)
Team 10 km walk (junior event)	(Mexico) México	5 pts	El Salvador	13 pts	Guatemala	18 pts
Team 20 km walk	(Mexico) México	16 pts	Guatemala	28 pts	United States	39 pts

== Results ==
=== Men's 20 km ===
Place	Athlete	Time
1st place, gold medalist(s)	Luis López COL	1:22:18
2nd place, silver medalist(s)	James Rendón COL	1:23:21
3rd place, bronze medalist(s)	Omar Segura MEX	1:23:49
4	Pedro Daniel Gómez MEX	1:23:58
5	Adrián Herrera MEX	1:24:33
6	David Mejía MEX	1:25:12
7	Yerko Araya CHI	1:27:10
8	Víctor Mendoza ESA	1:27:49
9	Ricardo Reyes ESA	1:28:02
10	Allan Segura CRC	1:29:06
11	Gustavo Restrepo COL	1:29:19
12	Noel Santini PUR	1:29:28
13	Mário dos Santos BRA	1:30:44
14	Patrick Stroupe USA	1:31:00
15	Walter Sandoval ESA	1:31:11
16	Inaki Gomez CAN	1:31:19
17	Aníbal Paau GUA	1:32:43
18	Erik Marques BRA	1:33:28
19	Osman Flores NCA	1:33:44
20	Yassir Cabrera PAN	1:34:30
21	Mario Bran GUA	1:35:33
22	Tim Seaman USA	1:41:22
23	Creighton Connolly CAN	1:42:46
24	Ian Whatley USA	1:44:39
25	José Ledezma CRC	1:45:09
—	Alexandre Cagne CAN	DQ
—	Luis Gómez GUA	DQ
—	Elfrid Hernández GUA	DQ
—	Jonathan Riekmann BRA	DNF
—	Sergio Gutiérrez CRC	DNS
—	Rolando Saquipay ECU	DNS
—	Mauricio Arteaga ECU	DNS
—	Claudio Villanueva ECU	DNS

==== Team ====
Place	Country	Points
1st place, gold medalist(s)	(Mexico) México	12 pts
2nd place, silver medalist(s)	Colombia	14 pts
3rd place, bronze medalist(s)	El Salvador	32 pts
4	United States	60 pts

=== Men's 50 km ===
Place	Athlete	Time
1st place, gold medalist(s)	Cristian Berdeja MEX	3:58:46
2nd place, silver medalist(s)	Mesías Zapata ECU	4:08:10
3rd place, bronze medalist(s)	Rodrigo Moreno COL	4:09:31
4	Néstor Rueda COL	4:12:29
5	Salvador Mira ESA	4:15:48
6	Claudio dos Santos BRA	4:16:24
7	Daniel Córdova MEX	4:16:54
8	Fredy Hernández COL	4:21:30
9	David Guevara ECU	4:23:44
10	Josué Hun GUA	4:59:46
11	Luis Morales PUR	5:07:16
—	Luis Garcia GUA	DQ
—	Sidnei Rodrigues BRA	DNF
—	Sergio Gutiérrez CRC	DNF
—	Edwin Ochoa ECU	DNF
—	Marco Benavides ESA	DNF
—	Emerson Hernández ESA	DNF
—	Édgar Hernández MEX	DNF
—	Mario Flores MEX	DNF
—	Fraulín Caminero DOM	DNF

==== Team ====
Place	Country	Points
1st place, gold medalist(s)	Colombia	15 pts

=== Men's 10 km (Junior) ===
Place	Athlete	Time
1st place, gold medalist(s)	Caio Bonfim BRA	43:04
2nd place, silver medalist(s)	Adrián Ochoa MEX	43:05
3rd place, bronze medalist(s)	Julián Rendón COL	43:57
4	Evan Dunfee CAN	44:16
5	Isaac Palma MEX	44:19
6	José Leonardo Montaña COL	45:19
7	Juan Carlos Hernández GUA	45:56
8	Trevor Barron USA	46:35
9	Ever Palma MEX	47:38
10	Gerardo Lee PAN	49:20
11	César Martínez ESA	49:35
12	Ricardo Vergara USA	49:37
13	Mattew Forgues USA	50:10
14	Patrick Mathuz GUA	50:25
15	Miguel Martínez PUR	51:10
16	Rudney Nogueira BRA	51:32
17	Nelson Pérez GUA	51:57
18	Justin Soto CRC	54:33
19	Luis Mendoza ESA	58:15
—	Eduardo da Silva BRA	DQ
—	David Escobar ESA	DQ
—	José Fernández ECU	DNS
—	Damián Campaña ECU	DNS
—	Jonathan Cáceres ECU	DNS

==== Team ====
Place	Country	Points
1st place, gold medalist(s)	(Mexico) México	7 pts
2nd place, silver medalist(s)	Colombia	9 pts
3rd place, bronze medalist(s)	Brazil	17 pts
4	United States	20 pts
5	Guatemala	21 pts
6	El Salvador	30 pts

=== Women's 20 km ===
Place	Athlete	Time
1st place, gold medalist(s)	Tânia Spindler BRA	1:38:53
2nd place, silver medalist(s)	Verónica Colindres ESA	1:39:45
3rd place, bronze medalist(s)	Rosario Sánchez MEX	1:42:12
4	Sandra Galvis COL	1:43:48
5	Sandra Zapata COL	1:44:59
6	Angélica Hernández MEX	1:45:37
7	Graciela Mendoza MEX	1:46:21
8	Evelyn Núñez GUA	1:46:28
9	Mirna Ortiz GUA	1:47:01
10	Solomiya Login USA	1:47:16
11	Zoila Reyes GUA	1:47:42
12	Megan Huzzey CAN	1:49:37
13	Maria Michta USA	1:50:21
14	Bessy García ESA	1:50:59
15	Francisca Ferris PAN	1:54:58
16	Susan Randall USA	1:55:58
17	Ilena Ocampo CRC	2:07:40
—	María Guadalupe Sánchez MEX	DQ
—	Alessandra Picagevicz BRA	DNF
—	Cisiane Lopes BRA	DNF
—	María Arias CRC	DNF
—	Cristina López ESA	DNF
—	Johana Ordóñez ECU	DNS
—	Paola Pérez ECU	DNS

==== Team ====
Place	Country	Points
1st place, gold medalist(s)	(Mexico) México	16 pts
2nd place, silver medalist(s)	Guatemala	28 pts
3rd place, bronze medalist(s)	United States	39 pts

=== Women's 10 km (Junior) ===
Place	Athlete	Time
1st place, gold medalist(s)	Anlly Pineda COL	49:50
2nd place, silver medalist(s)	Erandi Uribe MEX	50:50
3rd place, bronze medalist(s)	Adriana Ochoa MEX	51:29
4	Jamy Franco GUA	54:21
5	Mónica Mejía ESA	54:30
6	Kimberly García PER	54:54
7	Pamela Ramírez CRC	55:18
8	Linda Paz ESA	57:02
9	Wilane Cuebas PUR	1:00:11
10	Allison Chin USA	1:00:14
11	Mayara Vicentainer BRA	1:01:27
12	Camila da Silva BRA	1:03:56
13	Yesenia Miranda ESA	1:04:16
14	Andrea Barrientos GUA	1:07:15
15	Daniela de Andrade BRA	1:10:24
—	Natalia Barton ESA	DQ
—	Dulce Angélica Arrieta MEX	DQ
—	Ximena Sangoquiza ECU	DNS
—	Karina Bustos ECU	DNS

==== Team ====
Place	Country	Points
1st place, gold medalist(s)	(Mexico) México	5 pts
2nd place, silver medalist(s)	El Salvador	13 pts
3rd place, bronze medalist(s)	Guatemala	18 pts
4	Brazil	23 pts

== Participation ==
The participation of 120 athletes from 15 countries was announced to participate. However, because of visa problems, the majority (namely 11 out of 13) of the Ecuadorian athletes was not allowed to enter the country. An unofficial count therefore only yields 108 participants.

- Brazil (14)
- Canada (5)
- Chile (1)
- Colombia (11)
- Costa Rica (7)
- Dominican Republic (1)
- Ecuador (2)
- El Salvador (16)
- Guatemala (14)
- (Mexico) México (18)
- Nicaragua (1)
- (Panama) Panamá (3)
- (Peru) Perú (1)
- Puerto Rico (4)
- United States (10)

== See also ==
- 2009 Race Walking Year Ranking
