= Athletics at the 2015 Pan American Games – Women's 20 kilometres walk =

Women's 20 kilometres walk at the 2015 Pan American Games
- Venue: Ontario Place West Channel
- Dates: July 19
- Competitors: 16 from 10 nations
- Winning score: 1:29:24

Medalists
| Gold medal | Lupita González | Mexico |
| Silver medal | Érica de Sena | Brazil |
| Bronze medal | Paola Pérez | Ecuador |

The women's 20 kilometres walk competition of the athletics events at the 2015 Pan American Games took place on the 19 of July on a temporary circuit around the Ontario Place West Channel. The defending Pan American Games champion is Jamy Franco of Guatemala.

== Records ==
| World record | Vera Sokolova (RUS) | 1:25:08 | Sochi, Russia | February 26, 2011 |
| Pan American Games record | Jamy Franco (GUA) | 1:32:38 | Guadalajara, Mexico | October 23, 2011 |

== Qualification ==
Each National Olympic Committee (NOC) was able to enter up to two entrants providing they had met the minimum standard (1.42.00) in the qualifying period (January 1, 2014 to June 28, 2015).

== Schedule ==
| Date | Time | Round |
|---|---|---|
| July 19, 2015 | 7:05 | Final |

== Abbreviations ==
- All times shown are in hours:minutes:seconds

| KEY: | q | Fastest non-qualifiers | Q | Qualified | NR | National record | PB | Personal best | SB | Seasonal best | DQ | Disqualified |

== Results ==
=== Final ===
| Rank | Athlete | Nation | Time | Notes |
|---|---|---|---|---|
| 1st place, gold medalist(s) | Lupita González | Mexico | 1:29:24 | GR |
| 2nd place, silver medalist(s) | Érica de Sena | Brazil | 1:30:03 | |
| 3rd place, bronze medalist(s) | Paola Pérez | Ecuador | 1:31:53 | PB |
| 4 | Sandra Arenas | Colombia | 1:32:36 | SB |
| 5 | Kimberly García | Peru | 1:32:45 | |
| 6 | Rachel Seaman | Canada | 1:32:49 | |
| 7 | Maria Michta-Coffey | United States | 1:33:07 | SB |
| 8 | Alejandra Ortega | Mexico | 1:35:03 | |
| 9 | Wendy Cornejo | Bolivia | 1:36:58 | |
| 10 | Miranda Melville | United States | 1:37:45 | |
| 11 | Cisiane Lopes | Brazil | 1:38:53 | |
| 12 | Katelynn Ramage | Canada | 1:46:03 | PB |
| 13 | Cristina López | El Salvador | 1:47:33 | |
| | Sandra Galvis | Colombia | DNF | |
| | Claudia Balderrama | Bolivia | DQ | |
| | Mirna Ortiz | Guatemala | DQ | |
