= 2015 Pan American Race Walking Cup =

- Organisers: APA
- Edition: 17th
- Date: May 9–10
- Host city: Arica, Chile
- Venue: Avenida Raúl Pey, Playa Chinchorro
- Events: 5 + 1 NACAC
- Participation: 152 + 2 NACAC athletes from 15 nations

The 2015 Pan American Race Walking Cup took place on May 9–10, 2015. The races were held on a 2 km circuit on Avenida Raúl Pey, Playa Chinchorro, in Arica, Chile. A detailed report of the event was given for the IAAF.

Complete results were published.

The event also served as inaugural NACAC Race Walking Championships with a separate Women's 50 km competition.

== Medallists ==
Event	Gold		Silver		Bronze	
Individual
Men's 20 km	Érick Barrondo; Guatemala	1:21:25	Caio Bonfim; Brazil	1:21:26	Iván Garrido; Colombia	1:21:39
Men's 50 km	Horacio Nava; Mexico	3:45:41	Cristian Berdeja; Mexico	3:50:19	James Rendón; Colombia	3:50:47
Men's 10 km Junior (U20)	Brayan Fuentes; Colombia	41:41	Paolo Yurivilca; Peru	41:45	César Herrera; Colombia	42:36
Women's 20 km	Lupita González; Mexico	1:29:21	Kimberly García; Peru	1:31:13	Mirna Ortiz; Guatemala	1:31:31
Women's 10 km Junior (U20)	Stefany Coronado; Bolivia	47:05	Valeria Ortuño; Mexico	47:19	María Montoya; Colombia	47:38
Team
Men's 20 km	Canada	21	Colombia	23	Guatemala	32
Men's 50 km	Mexico	7	Colombia	27		
Men's 10 km Junior (U20)	Colombia	4	Peru	6	Ecuador	20
Women's 20 km	Mexico	14	Guatemala	21	United States	35
Women's 10 km Junior (U20)	Colombia	7	Bolivia	10	Mexico	10

== Race results ==
=== Men's 20km ===
Individual race
Rank	Athlete	Country	Time
1st place, gold medalist(s)	Érick Barrondo	Guatemala	1:21:25
2nd place, silver medalist(s)	Caio Bonfim	Brazil	1:21:26
3rd place, bronze medalist(s)	Iván Garrido	Colombia	1:21:39
4	Evan Dunfee	Canada	1:21:54
5	Eder Sánchez	Mexico	1:21:58
6	José Leonardo Montaña	Colombia	1:22:45
7	Iñaki Gómez	Canada	1:23:31
8	Marco Antonio Rodríguez	Bolivia	1:23:35
9	Mauricio Arteaga	Ecuador	1:24:05
10	Benjamin Thorne	Canada	1:24:36
11	José María Raymundo	Guatemala	1:25:06
12	Rolando Saquipay	Ecuador	1:25:10
13	Juan Manuel Cano	Argentina	1:25:42
14	Manuel Esteban Soto	Colombia	1:26:27
15	Pavel Chihuán	Peru	1:26:29
16	Yerko Araya	Chile	1:26:31
17	José Meléndez	Puerto Rico	1:27:11
18	Jhon Castañeda	Colombia	1:28:08
19	Luis Miguel Colón	Puerto Rico	1:28:18
20	Gregorio Ajcam	Guatemala	1:29:17
21	Xavier Moreno	Ecuador	1:29:23
22	Gabriel Calvo	Costa Rica	1:29:24
23	John Nunn	United States	1:29:33
24^{†}	Patrick Stroupe^{†}	United States	1:30:04
25	Alex Chavez	United States	1:32:37
26	Luis Alfonso López	El Salvador	1:33:55
27	Nick Christie	United States	1:35:04
28	David Matos	Puerto Rico	1:35:21
29	Allan Segura	Costa Rica	1:35:23
30	David Cayllante	Bolivia	1:35:42
31	John Risch	United States	1:36:28
32	Rodrigo Zeballos	Bolivia	1:36:35
33	Caleb Gee	Canada	1:40:22
34	Roberto Churqui	Chile	1:40:30
35	Cristián Bascuñan	Chile	1:40:32
36^{†}	Jean Valenzuela^{†}	Chile	1:42:35
	José Alessandro Bagio	Brazil	DNF
	Lucas Gomes Mazzo	Brazil	DNF
	Brian Pintado	Ecuador	DNF
	Edward Araya	Chile	DQ

^{†}: Extra athlete not eligible for team points.

Teams
Rank	Team	Points
1st place, gold medalist(s)	Canada: Evan Dunfee / 4; Iñaki Gómez / 7; Benjamin Thorne / 10; (Caleb Gee) / (33)	21
2nd place, silver medalist(s)	Colombia: Iván Garrido / 3; José Leonardo Montaña / 6; Manuel Esteban Soto / 14; (Jhon Castañeda) / (18)	23
3rd place, bronze medalist(s)	Guatemala: Érick Barrondo / 1; José María Raymundo / 11; Gregorio Ajcam / 20	32
4	Ecuador: Mauricio Arteaga / 9; Rolando Saquipay / 12; Xavier Moreno / 21; (Brian Pintado) / (DNF)	42
5	Puerto Rico: José Meléndez / 17; Luis Miguel Colón / 19; David Matos / 28	64
6	Bolivia: Marco Antonio Rodríguez / 8; David Cayllante / 30; Rodrigo Zeballos / 32	70
7	United States: John Nunn / 23; Alex Chavez / 25; Nick Christie / 27; (John Risch) / (31)	75
8	Chile: Yerko Araya / 16; Roberto Churqui / 34; Cristián Bascuñan / 35; (Edward Araya) / (DQ)	85
	Brazil: (Caio Bonfim) / (2); (José Alessandro Bagio) / (DNF); (Lucas Gomes Mazzo) / (DNF)	DNF

- Note: Athletes in parentheses did not score for the team result. (n/s: nonscorer)

=== Men's 50km ===
Individual race
Rank	Athlete	Country	Time
1st place, gold medalist(s)	Horacio Nava	Mexico	3:45:41
2nd place, silver medalist(s)	Cristian Berdeja	Mexico	3:50:19
3rd place, bronze medalist(s)	James Rendón	Colombia	3:50:47
4	José Leyver Ojeda	Mexico	3:55:04
5^{†}	Luis Bustamante^{†}	Mexico	3:57:27
6^{†}	Jorge Armando Ruiz^{†}	Colombia	3:58:23
7	Omar Zepeda	Mexico	3:58:44
8	Luis Fernando López	Colombia	4:00:55
9	Luis Sánchez	Guatemala	4:01:48
10^{†}	Fredy Hernández^{†}	Colombia	4:02:46
11^{†}	Ferney Rojas^{†}	Colombia	4:05:29
12	Mario Bran	Guatemala	4:08:33
13	Jonathan Riekmann	Brazil	4:08:59
14	Edison Salazar	Ecuador	4:11:34
15^{†}	Rodrigo Moreno^{†}	Colombia	4:16:11
16	Jorge Díaz	Colombia	4:24:45
17	Michael Mannozzi	United States	4:46:07
18	Ian Whatley	United States	4:47:33
19	Sergio Gutiérrez	Costa Rica	4:53:37
	Deiby Cordero	Costa Rica	DNF
	Ronald Quispe	Bolivia	DNF
	Luis Villagra	Chile	DNF
	Yerenman Salazar	Venezuela	DNF
	Edgar Cudco	Ecuador	DNF
	Jonathan Cáceres	Ecuador	DNF
	Rudney Dias Nogueira	Brazil	DNF
	Luiz Felipe dos Santos	Brazil	DQ
	Omar Sierra	Colombia	DQ
	Ángel Batz	Guatemala	DNS

^{†}: Extra athlete not eligible for team points.

Teams
Rank	Team	Points
1st place, gold medalist(s)	Mexico: Horacio Nava / 1; Cristian Berdeja / 2; José Leyver Ojeda / 4; (Omar Zepeda) / (7)	7
2nd place, silver medalist(s)	Colombia: James Rendón / 3; Luis Fernando López / 8; Jorge Díaz / 16; (Omar Sierra) / (DQ)	27
	Brazil: (Jonathan Riekmann) / (13); (Rudney Dias Nogueira) / (DNF); (Luiz Felipe dos Santos) / (DQ)	DNF
	Ecuador: (Edison Salazar) / (14); (Edgar Cudco) / (DNF); (Jonathan Cáceres) / (DNF)	DNF

- Note: Athletes in parentheses did not score for the team result. (n/s: nonscorer)

=== Men's 10km Junior (U20) ===
Individual race
Rank	Athlete	Country	Time
1st place, gold medalist(s)	Brayan Fuentes	Colombia	41:41
2nd place, silver medalist(s)	Paolo Yurivilca	Peru	41:45
3rd place, bronze medalist(s)	César Herrera	Colombia	42:36
4	César Rodríguez	Peru	43:07
5	José Alejandro Barrondo	Guatemala	43:33
6	Marek Adamowicz	Canada	44:42
7^{†}	Lenín Mamani^{†}	Peru	44:51
8	Pablo Rodríguez	Bolivia	45:05
9	Braulio Morocho	Ecuador	45:20
10	Cristián Merchan	Colombia	45:37
11	David Hurtado	Ecuador	46:10
12	Jhonatan Amores	Ecuador	46:33
13	Yhojan Melillan	Chile	47:28
14	Anthony Peters	United States	48:14
15	Cameron Haught	United States	48:37
16	Cristaldo Quispe	Bolivia	49:10
17	Matheus Gabriel Correa	Brazil	49:48
18	Max Flores	Bolivia	50:01
19	Admilson de Pontes	Brazil	52:46
20	Rony Batista Pala Filho	Brazil	53:37
21	Alex Peters	United States	55:22
22	Antonio Beltran	Chile	56:45
	Jurgen Grave	Guatemala	DQ
	José Luis Doctor	Mexico	DQ
	Víctor Arque	Peru	DQ
	Rodrigo Cortés	Chile	DQ

^{†}: Extra athlete not eligible for team points.

Teams
Rank	Team	Points
1st place, gold medalist(s)	Colombia: Brayan Fuentes / 1; César Herrera / 3; (Cristián Merchan) / (10)	4
2nd place, silver medalist(s)	Peru: Paolo Yurivilca / 2; César Rodríguez / 4; (Víctor Arque) / (DQ)	6
3rd place, bronze medalist(s)	Ecuador: Braulio Morocho / 9; David Hurtado / 11; (Jonathan Amores) / (12)	20
4	Bolivia: Pablo Rodríguez / 8; Cristaldo Quispe / 16; (Max Flores) / (18)	24
5	United States: Anthony Peters / 14; Cameron Haught / 15; (Alex Peters) / (21)	29
6	Chile: Yhojan Melillan / 13; Antonio Beltran / 22; (Rodrigo Cortés) / (DQ)	35
7	Brazil: Matheus Gabriel Correa / 17; Admilson de Pontes / 19; (Rony Batista Pala Filho) / (20)	36

- Note: Athletes in parentheses did not score for the team result. (n/s: nonscorer)

=== Women's 20km ===
Individual race
Rank	Athlete	Country	Time
1st place, gold medalist(s)	Lupita González	Mexico	1:29:21 CR
2nd place, silver medalist(s)	Kimberly García	Peru	1:31:13
3rd place, bronze medalist(s)	Mirna Ortiz	Guatemala	1:31:31
4	Alejandra Ortega	Mexico	1:31:38
5	Maria Michta-Coffey	United States	1:34:06
6	Maritza Poncio	Guatemala	1:34:22
7	Wendy Cornejo	Bolivia	1:35:18
8	Miranda Melville	United States	1:35:50
9	Lizbeth Silva	Mexico	1:36:42
10	Cisiane Lopes	Brazil	1:37:29
11	Sandra Galvis	Colombia	1:37:55
12	Mayra Herrera	Guatemala	1:38:53
13	Paola Pérez	Ecuador	1:39:40
14	Ángela Castro	Bolivia	1:41:13
15	Irene Barrondo	Guatemala	1:41:56
16	Diner Moreno	Colombia	1:42:04
17	Stefanny Valencia	Ecuador	1:42:13
18	Yeseida Carrillo	Colombia	1:43:40
19	Jessica Hancco	Peru	1:43:41
20	Elianay Santana Pereira	Brazil	1:44:29
21	Magaly Bonilla	Ecuador	1:45:05
22	Katie Burnett	United States	1:45:24
23	Yesenia Miranda	El Salvador	1:45:49
24^{†}	Molly Josephs^{†}	United States	1:46:03
25	Carolina Mariño	Colombia	1:46:29
26	Yadira Guamán	Ecuador	1:47:51
27	Nair da Rosa	Brazil	1:48:28
28	Katelynn Ramage	Canada	1:50:28
29	Nicola Evangelista	Canada	1:52:22
30^{†}	Leslie Guavita^{†}	Colombia	1:53:42
31	Robyn Stevens	United States	1:54:05
32	Ilena Ocampo	Costa Rica	2:01:35

^{†}: Extra athlete not eligible for team points.

Teams
Rank	Team	Points
1st place, gold medalist(s)	Mexico: Lupita González / 1; Alejandra Ortega / 4; Lizbeth Silva / 9	14
2nd place, silver medalist(s)	Guatemala: Mirna Ortiz / 3; Maritza Poncio / 6; Mayra Herrera / 12; (Irene Barrondo) / (15)	21
3rd place, bronze medalist(s)	United States: Maria Michta-Coffey / 5; Miranda Melville / 8; Katie Burnett / 22; (Robyn Stevens) / (31)	35
4	Colombia: Sandra Galvis / 11; Diner Moreno / 16; Yeseida Carrillo / 18; (Carolina Mariño) / (25)	45
5	Ecuador: Paola Pérez / 13; Stefanny Valencia / 17; Magaly Bonilla / 21; (Yadira Guamán) / (26)	51
6	Brazil: Cisiane Lopes / 10; Elianay Santana Pereira / 20; Nair da Rosa / 27	57

- Note: Athletes in parentheses did not score for the team result. (n/s: nonscorer)

=== Women's 10km Junior (U20) ===
Individual race
Rank	Athlete	Country	Time
1st place, gold medalist(s)	Stefany Coronado	Bolivia	47:05 CR
2nd place, silver medalist(s)	Valeria Ortuño	Mexico	47:19
3rd place, bronze medalist(s)	María Montoya	Colombia	47:38
4	Lina Bolivar	Colombia	48:05
5	Karla Jaramillo	Ecuador	48:05
6	Leyde Guerra	Peru	49:05
7	Evelyn Inga	Peru	49:09
8	Julia Estrada	Mexico	49:17
9	Odeth Huanca	Bolivia	50:24
10	Nathaly León	Ecuador	51:43
11	Mishel Semblantes	Ecuador	52:21
12	Anali Cisneros	United States	52:26
13	Carolina Sarapura	Bolivia	53:03
14	Katharine Newhoff	United States	53:22
15	Katie Michta	United States	53:36
16	Vivian Castillo	Mexico	54:21
17^{†}	Catalina Maldonado^{†}	Chile	54:30
18	Michelle Varas	Chile	54:39
19	Anastasia Sanzana	Chile	55:18
20	Cheskaya Rosales	Venezuela	55:58
21	Rayane Caroline de Oliveira	Brazil	55:59
22	Daniela Parra	Chile	56:59
23	Silmara dos Santos de Souza	Brazil	57:08
24	Thaiz Pereira da Costa	Brazil	58:15
25^{†}	Gabriela Hernández^{†}	Chile	58:23

^{†}: Extra athlete not eligible for team points.

Teams
Rank	Team	Points
1st place, gold medalist(s)	Colombia: María Montoya / 3; Lina Bolivar / 4	7
2nd place, silver medalist(s)	Bolivia: Stefany Coronado / 1; Odeth Huanca / 9; (Carolina Sarapura) / (13)	10
3rd place, bronze medalist(s)	Mexico: Valeria Ortuño / 2; Julia Estrada / 8; (Vivian Castillo) / (16)	10
4	Peru: Leyde Guerra / 6; Evelyn Inga / 7	13
5	Ecuador: Karla Jaramillo / 5; Nathaly León / 10; (Mishel Semblantes) / (11)	15
6	United States: Anali Cisneros / 12; Katharine Newhoff / 14; (Katie Michta) / (15)	26
7	Chile: Michelle Varas / 18; Anastasia Sanzana / 19; (Daniela Parra) / (22)	37
8	Brazil: Rayane Caroline de Oliveira / 21; Silmara dos Santos de Souza / 23; (Thaiz Pereira da Costa) / (24)	44

- Note: Athletes in parentheses did not score for the team result. (n/s: nonscorer)

== Medal table (unofficial) ==
The host country is highlighted in lavender blue

Rank	Nation	Gold	Silver	Bronze	Total
1	Mexico	4	2	1	7
2	Colombia	3	2	4	9
3	Guatemala	1	1	2	4
4	Bolivia	1	1	0	2
5	Canada	1	0	0	1
6	Peru	0	3	0	3
7	Brazil	0	1	0	1
8	Ecuador	0	0	1	1
8	United States	0	0	1	1
Totals (9 entries)		10	10	9	29

- Note: Totals include both individual and team medals, with medals in the team competition counting as one medal.

== Participation ==
According to an unofficial count, 152 athletes from 15 countries participated.

- Argentina (1)
- Bolivia (12)
- Brazil (15)
- Canada (7)
- Chile (14)
- Colombia (22)
- Costa Rica (5)
- Ecuador (17)
- El Salvador (2)
- Guatemala (12)
- Mexico (13)
- Peru (9)
- Puerto Rico (3)
- United States (18 + 2 NACAC)
- Venezuela (2)

== NACAC Race Walking Championships ==
=== Women's 50km ===
Individual race
Rank	Athlete	Country	Time
1st place, gold medalist(s)	Erin Taylor-Talcott	United States	4:50:26
2nd place, silver medalist(s)	Susan Randall	United States	4:56:42
