= Central American Race Walking Championships =

International sports competition

The Central American Race Walking Championships (Spanish: Campeonato Centroamericano de Marcha) is an annual race walking competition organized by CADICA for athletes representing the countries of its member associations. The event was established in 2007 as Central American Race Walking Cup (Spanish: Copa Centroamericana de Marcha). The name was changed in 2012. Races are featured for senior (Spanish: Mayor), junior (U-20, Spanish: Juvenil A), youth (U-18, Spanish: Juvenil B), and two age groups (U-16, (Spanish: Juvenil C), and U-14, (Spanish: Infantil A)) for both male and female athletes. In addition, there are separate team competitions.

== Editions ==
=== Central American Race Walking Cup ===
	Year	City	Country	Date
I	2007	Ciudad de Guatemala	Guatemala	February 4
II	2008	Panamá	Panama	June 7–8
III	2009	San Salvador	El Salvador	March 22
IV	2011	San Salvador	El Salvador	February 27

=== Central American Race Walking Championships ===
	Year	City	Country	Date
I	2012	Cartago	Costa Rica	March 24
II	2013	Ciudad de Guatemala	Guatemala	February 3
III	2014	San Salvador	El Salvador	March 30
IV	2015	San Salvador	El Salvador	March 21

== Results ==
Complete result list were published on the CADICA website. Results for the junior and youth competitions can be found on the World Junior Athletics History ("WJAH") webpage.

=== Men's results ===
==== Senior ====
===== 20 kilometres =====
Year	Gold		Silver		Bronze	
2007	Allan Segura (CRC)	1:22:53	Bernardo Calvo (CRC)	1:22:59	Julio Martínez (GUA)	1:25:06
2008	Aníbal Paau (GUA)	1:39:05.7	Yassir Cabrera (PAN)	1.39.37.5	Ricardo Reyes (ESA)	1:45:51.2
2009	Walter Sandoval (ESA)	1:25:46	Víctor Hugo Mendoza (ESA)	1:26:17	Aníbal Paau (GUA)	1:27:58
2011	Erick Barrondo (GUA)	1:24:34	Aníbal Paau (GUA)	1:25:46	Allan Segura (CRC)	1:26:30
2012	Aníbal Paau (GUA)	1:26:13	Mario Bran (GUA)	1:27:23	Bernardo Calvo (CRC)	1:27:45
2013	Allan Segura (CRC)	1:38:52	Mario Bran (GUA)	1:42:02	Salvador Ernesto Mira (ESA)	1:43:40
2014	José María Raymundo (GUA)	1:29:53	Mario Bran (GUA)	1:31:34	José Gregorio Ajcam (GUA)	1:31:54

===== 35 kilometres =====
Year	Gold		Silver		Bronze	
2011	Emerson Hernández (ESA)	2:48:30	Jaime Daniel Quiyuch (GUA)	2:48:32	Bernardo Calvo (CRC)	2:51:37

==== Junior U-20 (Juvenil A) ====
===== 10 kilometres =====
Year	Gold		Silver		Bronze	
2007	Emerson Hernández (ESA)	44:33	Yassir Cabrera (PAN)	44:33	Alexander Velásquez (GUA)	45:22
2008	Emerson Hernández (ESA)	47:07.3	Mario Bran (GUA)	47:08.9	Alexander Velásquez (GUA)	49:45.7
2009	César Martínez (ESA)	48:06	Patrick Mathuz (GUA)	50:47	David Alexander Escobar (ESA)	53:33
2011	Deiby Cordero (CRC)	51:43	Roberto Carlos Paredes (ESA)	56:21	Erick Josué Rivas (ESA)	1:05:07
2012	Luis Ángel Sánchez (GUA)	45:20	José Gregorio Ajcam (GUA)	46:28	Luis Alfonso López (ESA)	48:57
2013^{†}	Luis Alfonso López (ESA)	49:20				
2014	Jürgen Grave (GUA)	45:42	Juan Ajpop (GUA)	47:41	Carlos Emmanuel Raymundo (GUA)	48:32

^{†}: In 2013, some non-CADICA race walkers were invited to start out of competition. Luis Miguel Colón from Puerto Rico finished 2nd in 53:53, Jan Carlos Figueroa also from Puerto Rico finished 3rd in 55:53.

==== Youth U-18 (Juvenil B) ====
===== 10 kilometres =====
Year	Gold		Silver		Bronze	
2007	Patrik Matheus (GUA)	54:31	Nestor Mejía (NCA)	56:12		
2008	Juan Carlos Hernández (GUA)	52:49.8	Héctor Mejía (NCA)	59:43.8	Justin Soto (CRC)	1:05:04.3
2009	Juan Carlos Hernández (GUA)	44:27	Nelson Leonel Pérez (GUA)	52:38	Justin Soto (CRC)	54:02
2011	César Cristian Escobar (ESA)	50:54	Bryan Barahona Beltrán (ESA)	51:53	Luis Alfonso López (ESA)	51:54
2012	Jürgen Grave (GUA)	47:20	Wilmer Santiago Rosales (GUA)	49:58	David Alexander Escobar (ESA)	52:09
2013	Jürgen Grave (GUA)	49:24	José Alejandro Barrondo (GUA)	52:50	Óscar Armando Menjívar (ESA)	54:47
2014	Gerson Otoniel Navas (ESA)	50:29	Justin Álvarez (CRC)	59:40		

==== U-16 (Juvenil C) ====
===== 5 kilometres =====
Year	Gold		Silver		Bronze	
2007	Juan Carlos Hernández (GUA)	24:53	Luis Ángel Sánchez (GUA)	25:53	Héctor Mendoza (NCA)	27:14
2008	Kamil Zeledón (NCA)	29:53.9	Federico Ferris (PAN)	31:35.3		
2009	Mynor Alexsander Morales (GUA)	25:13	Luis Alexander Mendoza (ESA)	27:06	Luis Carlos Vargas (CRC)	27:52
2011	Jasón Steven Acevedo (ESA)	24:23	Oscar Armando Menjívar (ESA)	26:55	Alcides Esaú Rosales (ESA)	27:37
2012	Oscar Armando Menjívar (ESA)	25:47	Gerson Otoniel Navas (ESA)	26:43	Melvin Donovan Castillo (GUA)	30:59
2013	Gerson Otoniel Navas (ESA)	27:07	Sergio Daniel Sacul (GUA)	27:39	Dennis Alfredo Pérez (GUA)	28:24
2014	Aníbal Xiquin (GUA)	24:08 CR	Joseph Alejandro Hernández (ESA)	25:32	Frank Alberto Hernández (ESA)	25:39

==== U-14 (Infantil A) ====
===== 3 kilometres =====
Year	Gold		Silver		Bronze	
2011	William Kelvin Castillo (ESA)	17:50	Joseph Alejandro Hernández (ESA)	17:55	Jefry Alejandro Barahona (ESA)	18:29
2012	Joseph Alejandro Hernández (ESA)	16:20	Juan Manuel Calderón (CRC)	19:34		
2013	Cristofer Noé Colop (GUA)	17:27	José Gilberto Menjívar (ESA)	18:16		
2014	José Gilberto Menjívar (ESA)	16:19 CR	Bryan Alexandre Hernández (ESA)	16:22	Daniel Fernando López (ESA)	16:41

=== Women's results ===
==== Senior ====
===== 10 kilometres =====
Year	Gold		Silver		Bronze	
2009	Verónica Colindres (ESA)	46:30	Zoila Reyes (GUA)	51:09	Mirna Ortíz (GUA)	51:23
2012^{†}	Ileana Ocampo (CRC)	1:04:24				
2013	Cristina Esmeralda López (ESA)	55:48	María Esperanza López (GUA)	1:02:04	Marlen Gabriela Carranza (GUA)	1:02:55
2014	Cristina Esmeralda López (ESA)	49:02 CR	Glenda Úbeda (NCA)	56:29	Ileana Ocampo (CRC)	57:54

^{†}: In 2012, Wilane Cuevas from Puerto Rico started out of competition and finished 1st in 57:09.

===== 20 kilometres =====
Year	Gold		Silver		Bronze	
2007	Evelyn Núñez (GUA)	1:36:05	Glenda Úbeda (NCA)	1:55:02		
2008	Francisca Ferris (PAN)	2:11:28.6	Yaditza Pérez (PAN)	2:44:17.9	Ada Guerra (PAN)	3:00:23.8
2011	Jamy Franco (GUA)	1:37:53	Mirna Ortíz (GUA)	1:39:52	Cristina Esmeralda López (ESA)	1:49:46
2014^{†}						

^{†}: In 2014, Irmary Colon from Puerto Rico was the only competitor starting as a guest. She finished in 2:01:36.

==== Junior U-20 (Juvenil A) ====
===== 10 kilometres =====
Year	Gold		Silver		Bronze	
2007	Mayra Herrera (GUA)	54:52				
2008	Paulina de García (PAN)	1:11:27.3				
2009	Linda Tatiana Paz (ESA)	51:28	Natalia Barton (ESA)	54:20	Mónica Vásquez (ESA)	54:30
2011	Angie Cerdas (CRC)	1:05:58	María Eugenia Castellón (ESA)	1:25:50		
2012^{†}	Yesenia Ivania Miranda (ESA)	51:40	Mishelly Charo González (GUA)	1:01:49	Priscilla Torres (CRC)	1:02:33
2013	Maritza Rafaela Poncio (GUA)	57:32	Sonia Irene Barrondo (GUA)	57:43	Yesenia Ivania Miranda (ESA)	57:48
2014	Sonia Irene Barrondo (GUA)	52:14	Karin Clarissa Vicente (GUA)	55:38	Alicia María Vargas (CRC)	1:01:07

^{†}: In 2012, Sonia Irene Barrondo from Guatemala (aged 17) started out of competition and finished 2nd in 56:42.

==== Youth U-18 (Juvenil B) ====
===== 5 kilometres =====
Year	Gold		Silver		Bronze	
2007	Jamy Franco (GUA)	24:35	Mónica Mejía (ESA)	26:49	Joceline Quintanilla (GUA)	28:37
2008	Brendys Zeledón (NCA)	29:34.9	Pamela Ramírez (CRC)	30:16.3	Ángela Ferris (PAN)	30:33.5
2009	Angie Cerdas (CRC)	29:05	Andrea Barrientos (GUA)	29:57	Darlin Estefani Rodríguez (ESA)	31:59
2011	Kenia Rodríguez (ESA)	29:20	Priscilla Torres (CRC)	30:00	Rosalina Álvarez (NCA)	30:45
2012	Karin Clarissa Vicente (GUA)	29:36	Cefora Poncio (GUA)	29:42	Kimberly Joseph Torres (CRC)	31:59
2013	Karin Clarissa Vicente (GUA)	29:00	Xiomara Elizabeth López (ESA)	30:17	Lilian Chaclán (GUA)	32:46
2014	Gilma Beatriz de la O (ESA)	29:00 =CR	Elisa Jocabed Hernández (GUA)	29:41	María Daniela Núñez (CRC)	30:25

==== U-16 (Juvenil C) ====
===== 4 kilometres =====
Year	Gold		Silver		Bronze	
2007	Brendys Zeledón (NCA)	23:35	Dayana Estrada (GUA)	24:18	Sheila Pérez (GUA)	25:09
2008	Gissel Rodríguez (PAN)	23:53.4	Angie Cerdas (CRC)	26:38.9	Rebeca Murillo (PAN)	28:42.6

===== 5 kilometres =====
Year	Gold		Silver		Bronze	
2009	Yesenia Ivania Miranda (ESA)	28:39	Kenia Rodríguez (ESA)	29:35	Priscilla Torres (CRC)	31:36
2011	Cefora Poncio (GUA)	31:06	María Fabiola Rojas (CRC)	32:52	Karla Francisca Davila (NCA)	35:56
2012	Madeleine Alicia Grave (GUA)	27:24	Xiomara Elizabeth López (ESA)	27:33	Brenda Arely Mauricio (ESA)	28:09
2013	Madeleine Alicia Grave (GUA)	29:27	Arely Esmeralda Morales (GUA)	30:21	Katia Vanessa Almendarez (ESA)	30:51
2014	Noelia Vargas (CRC)	27:55	Katia Vanessa Almendarez (ESA)	28:09	Katherin Gabriela Ortíz (GUA)	28:09

==== U-14 (Infantil A) ====
===== 2 kilometres =====
Year	Gold		Silver		Bronze	
2011	Katia Vanessa Almendarez (ESA)	11:45	Celestina Casia (GUA)	13:42		
2012	Katia Vanessa Almendarez (ESA)	10:15	Wendy María Porras (CRC)	12:28	Gabriela Campos (CRC)	13:22
2013	Rosa González (ESA)	11:53	Wendy Beatriz Ispanel (GUA)	13:03	Katherin Gabriela Ortíz (GUA)	13:43
2014	Glendy Verónica Teletor (GUA)	10:44	Paulina del Carmen Ortega (CRC)	11:05	Adriana Marcela Pérez (ESA)	11:20

== See also ==
- IAAF World Race Walking Cup
- European Race Walking Cup
- Pan American Race Walking Cup
- South American Race Walking Championships
- Asian Race Walking Championships
- Oceania Race Walking Championships
