= Athletics at the 2019 Pan American Games – Women's 20 kilometres walk =

Women's 20 kilometres walk at the 2019 Pan American Games
- Venue: Parque Kennedy
- Dates: August 4
- Competitors: 15 from 10 nations
- Winning time: 1:28:03

Medalists
Gold medal	Sandra Arenas	Colombia
Silver medal	Kimberly García	Peru
Bronze medal	Érica de Sena	Brazil

The women's 20 kilometres walk competition of the athletics events at the 2019 Pan American Games took place on 4 August on a temporary circuit around the Parque Kennedy in Lima, Peru. The defending Pan American Games champion was Lupita González of Mexico.

== Records ==
World record	Liu Hong (CHN)	1:24:38	A Coruña, Spain	June 6, 2015
Pan American Games record	Lupita González (MEX)	1:29:24	Toronto, Canada	July 19, 2015

== Schedule ==
Date	Time	Round
August 4, 2019	8:00	Final

== Abbreviations ==
- All times shown are in hours:minutes:seconds

KEY:	q	Fastest non-qualifiers	Q	Qualified	NR	National record	PB	Personal best	SB	Seasonal best	DQ	Disqualified

== Results ==
Rank	Athlete	Nation	Time	Notes
1st place, gold medalist(s)	Sandra Arenas	Colombia	1:28:03	GR, NR
2nd place, silver medalist(s)	Kimberly García	Peru	1:29:00	SB
3rd place, bronze medalist(s)	Érica de Sena	Brazil	1:30:34	
4	Ilse Guerrero	Mexico	1:30:54	PB
5	Ángela Castro	Bolivia	1:32:15	SB
6	Noelia Vargas	Costa Rica	1:33:09	PB
7	Rachelle De Orbeta	Puerto Rico	1:33:31	PB
8	Karla Jaramillo	Ecuador	1:33:54	
9	Maritza Poncio	Guatemala	1:36:49	
10	Mary Luz Andía	Peru	1:37:03	
11	Sandra Galvis	Colombia	1:38:43	
12	Robyn Stevens	United States	1:40:29	
13	Rebeca Pamela Enríquez	Mexico	1:41:28	
	Magaly Bonilla	Ecuador	DSQ	
	Miranda Melville	United States	DSQ	
