= 2010 IAAF World Race Walking Cup =

- Organisers: IAAF
- Edition: 24th
- Date: May 15–16
- Host city: Chihuahua, Chihuahua, Mexico
- Events: 5
- Participation: 42 athletes from 264 nations

The 2010 IAAF World Race Walking Cup was held on 15 and 16 May 2010 in the streets of Chihuahua, Mexico.

Detailed reports on the event and an appraisal of the results was given for the IAAF.

Complete results were published.

== Medallists ==
Event	Gold		Silver		Bronze	
Men
Men's 20 km walk	Wang Hao (CHN)	1:22:35 SB	Zhu Yafei (CHN)	1:22:46	Andrey Krivov (RUS)	1:22:54 SB
Men's 50 km walk	Matej Tóth (SVK)	3:53:30 SB	Horacio Nava (MEX)	3:54:16 SB	Jared Tallent (AUS)	3:54:55 SB
Men's 10 km walk (junior event)	Éider Arévalo (COL)	42:13 NR	Cai Zelin (CHN)	42:22 PB	Valery Filipchuk (RUS)	42:58
Team (Men)
Team Men's 20 km walk	China (CHN)	9	Russia (RUS)	25	Mexico (MEX)	41
Team Men's 50 km walk	China (CHN)	21	Mexico (MEX)	22	Russia (RUS)	38
Team Men's 10 km walk (junior event)	Russia (RUS)	7	China (CHN)	7	Colombia (COL)	9
Women
Women's 20 km walk	María Vasco (ESP)	1:31:55 SB	Vera Santos (POR)	1:32:06	Inês Henriques (POR)	1:33:28
Women's 10 km walk (junior event)	Antonella Palmisano (ITA)	47:52	He Qin (CHN)	47:57 PB	Anna Lukyanova (RUS)	48:00
Team (Women)
Team Women's 20 km walk	Portugal (POR)	13	Spain (ESP)	22	China (CHN)	32
Team Women's 10 km walk (junior event)	China (CHN)	6	Russia (RUS)	8	Italy (ITA)	12

== Results ==
=== Men's 20 km ===
Place	Athlete	Nation	Time	Notes
1st place, gold medalist(s)	Wang Hao	China (CHN)	1:22:35	SB
2nd place, silver medalist(s)	Zhu Yafei	China (CHN)	1:22:46	
3rd place, bronze medalist(s)	Andrey Krivov	Russia (RUS)	1:22:54	SB
4	Erik Tysse	Norway (NOR)	1:22:55	
5	Luis Fernando López	Colombia (COL)	1:23:11	
6	Chen Ding	China (CHN)	1:23:49	
7	Eder Sánchez	Mexico (MEX)	1:23:56	
8	Sergey Bakulin	Russia (RUS)	1:24:05	SB
9	Gustavo Restrepo	Colombia (COL)	1:24:08	SB
10	Yerko Araya	Chile (CHI)	1:24:23	
11	Hassanine Sebei	Tunisia (TUN)	1:24:27	SB
12	Ivano Brugnetti	Italy (ITA)	1:24:29	SB
13	Miguel Ángel López	Spain (ESP)	1:24:32	
14	Petr Trofimov	Russia (RUS)	1:25:03	
15	Pedro Daniel Gómez	Mexico (MEX)	1:25:09	SB
16	Rafal Augustyn	Poland (POL)	1:25:28	
17	Denis Strelkov	Russia (RUS)	1:25:30	
18	José Ignacio Díaz	Spain (ESP)	1:25:55	
19	Claudio Erasmo Vargas	Mexico (MEX)	1:26:19	SB
20	Koichiro Morioka	Japan (JPN)	1:26:36	
21	Wang Zhen	China (CHN)	1:26:49	
22	Benjamin Sánchez	Spain (ESP)	1:26:55	
23	Rafał Fedaczyński	Poland (POL)	1:26:58	
24	Isamu Fujisawa	Japan (JPN)	1:27:19	
25	Jean-Jacques Nkouloukidi	Italy (ITA)	1:27:24	
26	Sérgio Vieira	Portugal (POR)	1:27:25	
27	Jakub Jelonek	Poland (POL)	1:27:35	
28	Augusto Cardoso	Portugal (POR)	1:27:40	
29	Kevin Campion	France (FRA)	1:27:45	
30	Pedro Isidro	Portugal (POR)	1:27:55	
31	Li Jianbo	China (CHN)	1:28:06	
33	Jhon García	Colombia (COL)	1:28:20	
34	José David Domínguez	Spain (ESP)	1:28:21	
35	Allan Segura	Costa Rica (CRC)	1:28:25	
36	Anton Kučmín	Slovakia (SVK)	1:28:28	
37	Dawid Tomala	Poland (POL)	1:29:21	
38	Andrey Ruzavin	Russia (RUS)	1:29:22	
39	Matteo Giupponi	Italy (ITA)	1:29:39	
40	Daniele Paris	Italy (ITA)	1:29:56	
41	Yusuke Suzuki	Japan (JPN)	1:30:08	
42	Mauricio Arteaga	Ecuador (ECU)	1:30:11	
43	Antonin Boyez	France (FRA)	1:30:39	
44	Perseus Ibáñez-Karlström	Sweden (SWE)	1:30:49	
45	Victor Mendoza	El Salvador (ESA)	1:30:57	
46	Inaki Gomez	Canada (CAN)	1:31:14	
47	Ian Rayson	Australia (AUS)	1:31:21	
48	Máté Helebrandt	Hungary (HUN)	1:31:42	
49	Noel Santini	Puerto Rico (PUR)	1:32:17	
50	Francisco Arcilla	Spain (ESP)	1:32:31	
51	Giovanni Torres	Mexico (MEX)	1:32:56	
52	Andreas Gustafsson	Sweden (SWE)	1:33:00	
53	Anibal Paau	Guatemala (GUA)	1:33:22	
54	Grzegorz Sudoł	Poland (POL)	1:33:27	
55	Anatole Ibáñez	Sweden (SWE)	1:33:29	
56	Ricardo Lojan	Ecuador (ECU)	1:33:37	
57	Moacir Zimmermann	Brazil (BRA)	1:34:28	
58	Edward Araya	Chile (CHI)	1:34:47	
59	Jonathan Cáceres	Ecuador (ECU)	1:35:47	
60	Recep Celik	Turkey (TUR)	1:35:52	
61	Patrick Stroupe	United States (USA)	1:37:24	
62	Hédi Taraaoui	Tunisia (TUN)	1:37:38	
63	Mehdu Boufraine	France (FRA)	1:37:46	
64	Jacques van Bremen	Netherlands (NED)	1:41:04	
65	Harold van Beek	Netherlands (NED)	1:44:33	
66	Creighton Connolly	Canada (CAN)	1:45:31	
—	Luis Gómez	Guatemala (GUA)	DQ	
—	Bernardo Segura	Mexico (MEX)	DQ	
—	Adam Rutter	Australia (AUS)	DNF	
—	Evan Dunfee	Canada (CAN)	DNF	
—	Rolando Saquipay	Ecuador (ECU)	DNF	
—	Yohan Diniz	France (FRA)	DNF	
—	Fortunato DʼOnofrio	Italy (ITA)	DNF	
—	António Pereira	Portugal (POR)	DNF	
—	Dan Serianni	United States (USA)	DNF	

==== Team (20 km Men) ====
Place	Country	Points
1st place, gold medalist(s)	China	9 pts
2nd place, silver medalist(s)	Russia	25 pts
3rd place, bronze medalist(s)	Mexico	41 pts
4	Colombia	47 pts
5	Spain	53 pts
6	Poland	66 pts
7	Italy	76 pts
8	Portugal	84 pts
9	Japan	85 pts
10	Ecuador	130 pts
11	France	135 pts
12	Sweden	151 pts

=== Men's 50 km ===
Place	Athlete	Nation	Time	Notes
1st place, gold medalist(s)	Matej Tóth	Slovakia (SVK)	3:53:30	SB
2nd place, silver medalist(s)	Horacio Nava	Mexico (MEX)	3:54:16	SB
3rd place, bronze medalist(s)	Jared Tallent	Australia (AUS)	3:54:55	SB
4	Si Tianfeng	China (CHN)	3:55:06	SB
5	Jesús Angel García	Spain (ESP)	3:55:41	SB
6	Yuki Yamazaki	Japan (JPN)	3:55:44	
7	Cristian Berdeja	Mexico (MEX)	3:56:26	PB
8	Li Lei	China (CHN)	3:56:46	
9	Xu Faguang	China (CHN)	3:57:50	
10	Sergey Sergachev	Russia (RUS)	3:58:11	PB
11	Mikel Odriozola	Spain (ESP)	3:58:15	SB
12	Yury Andronov	Russia (RUS)	3:58:21	SB
13	Omar Zepeda	Mexico (MEX)	3:59:39	
14	Marco De Luca	Italy (ITA)	4:00:45	SB
15	Chris Erickson	Australia (AUS)	4:03:56	SB
16	Sergey Melentyev	Russia (RUS)	4:05:00	SB
17	Rafal Sikora	Poland (POL)	4:05:02	SB
18	Bertrand Moulinet	France (FRA)	4:05:08	SB
19	José Leyver Ojeda	Mexico (MEX)	4:05:23	
20	Rodrigo Moreno	Colombia (COL)	4:05:44	SB
21	Colin Griffin	Ireland (IRL)	4:06:05	
22	Juan Manuel Molina	Spain (ESP)	4:06:08	
23	Ferrán Collados	Spain (ESP)	4:06:24	
24	Emerson Hernández	El Salvador (ESA)	4:06:47	
25	Du Yunpeng	China (CHN)	4:07:32	
26	Diego Cafagna	Italy (ITA)	4:10:18	
27	Federico Tontodonati	Italy (ITA)	4:11:29	
28	Cédric Houssaye	France (FRA)	4:12:55	
29	Ivan Zhbanov	Russia (RUS)	4:14:31	
30	Marc Mundell	South Africa (RSA)	4:14:42	
31	Dionisio Ventura	Portugal (POR)	4:15:17	
32	Miloš Bátovský	Slovakia (SVK)	4:15:23	
33	Tom Barnes	Australia (AUS)	4:16:17	
34	Jorge Costa	Portugal (POR)	4:17:19	
35	Luís Gil	Portugal (POR)	4:17:47	
36	Andrea Adragna	Italy (ITA)	4:18:53	
37	Hervé Davaux	France (FRA)	4:18:53	
38	David Guevara	Ecuador (ECU)	4:20:59	
39	Dušan Majdán	Slovakia (SVK)	4:21:23	
40	Cláudio dos Santos	Brazil (BRA)	4:21:28	
41	Eddy Roze	France (FRA)	4:23:16	
42	Sébastien Biche	France (FRA)	4:26:22	
43	Mesias Zapata	Ecuador (ECU)	4:27:19	
44	Gou Xiaoxin	China (CHN)	4:30:10	
45	Róbert Tubak	Hungary (HUN)	4:39:31	
46	László Novák	Hungary (HUN)	4:45:13	
47	Jonathan Matthews	United States (USA)	4:45:52	
48	Gyula Dudás	Hungary (HUN)	4:48:19	
49	Edgar Cudco	Ecuador (ECU)	4:48:45	
50	Ray Sharp	United States (USA)	4:56:52	
—	Washington Alvarado	Ecuador (ECU)	DQ	
—	Luke Adams	Australia (AUS)	DNF	
—	Bernardo Calvo	Costa Rica (CRC)	DNF	
—	Marco Benavides	El Salvador (ESA)	DNF	
—	José Alejandro Cambil	Spain (ESP)	DNF	
—	Luis García	Guatemala (GUA)	DNF	
—	Fabio Ruzzier	Slovenia (SLO)	DNF	
—	Dave McGovern	United States (USA)	DNF	

==== Team (50 km Men) ====
Place	Country	Points
1st place, gold medalist(s)	China	21 pts
2nd place, silver medalist(s)	Mexico	22 pts
3rd place, bronze medalist(s)	Russia	38 pts
4	Spain	38 pts
5	Australia	51 pts
6	Italy	67 pts
7	Slovakia	72 pts
8	France	83 pts
9	Portugal	100 pts
10	Ecuador	130 pts
11	Hungary	139 pts

=== Men's 10 km (Junior) ===
Place	Athlete	Nation	Time	Notes
1st place, gold medalist(s)	Éider Arévalo	Colombia (COL)	42:13	
2nd place, silver medalist(s)	Cai Zelin	China (CHN)	42:22	
3rd place, bronze medalist(s)	Valeriy Filipchuk	Russia (RUS)	42:58	
4	Konstantin Kulagov	Russia (RUS)	43:24	
5	Cong Fudong	China (CHN)	43:55	
6	Niu Wenbin	China (CHN)	44:03	
7	Ever Palma	Mexico (MEX)	44:29	
8	Jhon Castañeda	Colombia (COL)	44:52	
9	Trevor Barron	United States (USA)	45:17	
10	Jesús Tadeo Vega	Mexico (MEX)	45:33	
11	Massimo Stano	Italy (ITA)	45:45	
12	Veli-Matti Partanen	Finland (FIN)	46:14	
13	Giovanni Renó	Italy (ITA)	46:19	
14	Julio César Salazar	Mexico (MEX)	46:23	
15	Rhydian Cowley	Australia (AUS)	46:57	
16	Mieczysław Romanowski	Poland (POL)	47:29	
17	Luís Alberto Amezcua	Spain (ESP)	47:43	
18	Tyler Sorensen	United States (USA)	47:54	
19	Juan Antonio Raya	Spain (ESP)	48:36	
20	Viktor Markus	Hungary (HUN)	48:40	
21	Lukáš Gdula	Czech Republic (CZE)	49:04	
22	Andrzej Łobaczewski	Poland (POL)	49:06	
23	Dimitri Malosse	France (FRA)	49:33	
24	Pavel Schrom	Czech Republic (CZE)	49:56	
25	Nicolas Gosselin	France (FRA)	50:02	
26	Hugo Andrieu	France (FRA)	50:49	
27	Victor Paloma	Spain (ESP)	51:19	
28	Daniel Lord	New Zealand (NZL)	51:24	
29	Jiří Malysa	Czech Republic (CZE)	51:54	
30	Alejandro Chavez	United States (USA)	52:41	
—	Dane Bird-Smith	Australia (AUS)	DQ	
—	Sean Fitzsimons	Australia (AUS)	DQ	
—	Caio Bonfim	Brazil (BRA)	DQ	
—	José Leonardo Montaña	Colombia (COL)	DQ	
—	Dementiy Cheparev	Russia (RUS)	DQ	
—	Leonardo Dei Tos	Italy (ITA)	DNF	

==== Team (10 km Men Junior) ====
Place	Country	Points
1st place, gold medalist(s)	Russia	7 pts
2nd place, silver medalist(s)	China	7 pts
3rd place, bronze medalist(s)	Colombia	9 pts
4	Mexico	17 pts
5	Italy	24 pts
6	United States	27 pts
7	Spain	36 pts
8	Poland	38 pts
9	Czech Republic	45 pts
10	France	48 pts

=== Women's 20 km ===
Place	Athlete	Nation	Time	Notes
1st place, gold medalist(s)	María Vasco	Spain (ESP)	1:31:55	SB
2nd place, silver medalist(s)	Vera Santos	Portugal (POR)	1:32:06	
3rd place, bronze medalist(s)	Inês Henriques	Portugal (POR)	1:33:28	
4	Vera Sokolova	Russia (RUS)	1:33:54	
5	Li Yanfei	China (CHN)	1:34:18	
6	Anisya Kirdyapkina	Russia (RUS)	1:34:47	
7	Mayumi Kawasaki	Japan (JPN)	1:34:53	
8	Ana Cabecinha	Portugal (POR)	1:34:57	
9	Jess Rothwell	Australia (AUS)	1:35:04	SB
10	María José Poves	Spain (ESP)	1:35:38	
11	Beatriz Pascual	Spain (ESP)	1:36:08	
12	Kristina Saltanovic	Lithuania (LTU)	1:36:28	
13	Liu Hong	China (CHN)	1:36:34	
14	Shi Yang	China (CHN)	1:37:38	
15	Yang Yawei	China (CHN)	1:37:38	
16	Susana Feitor	Portugal (POR)	1:37:58	SB
17	Zuzana Schindlerová	Czech Republic (CZE)	1:38:06	
18	Li Li	China (CHN)	1:38:59	
19	Claire Tallent	Australia (AUS)	1:39:08	
20	Maria del Rosario Sánchez	Mexico (MEX)	1:39:16	
21	Katarzyna Kwoka	Poland (POL)	1:39:28	
22	Kumi Otoshi	Japan (JPN)	1:39:29	
23	Lyudmila Arkhipova	Russia (RUS)	1:39:37	
24	Masumi Fuchise	Japan (JPN)	1:40:04	
25	Yadira Guamán	Ecuador (ECU)	1:40:19	
26	Júlia Takács	Spain (ESP)	1:40:58	
27	Sandra Galvis	Colombia (COL)	1:41:39	
28	María Guadalupe Sánchez	Mexico (MEX)	1:41:52	
29	Brigita Virbalytė	Lithuania (LTU)	1:42:05	
30	Lorena Luaces	Spain (ESP)	1:42:46	
31	Anne-Gaëlle Retout	France (FRA)	1:43:03	
32	Marie Polli	Switzerland (SUI)	1:43:10	
33	Katalin Varró	Hungary (HUN)	1:43:13	
34	Tânia Spindler	Brazil (BRA)	1:43:15	
35	Claudia Balderrama	Bolivia (BOL)	1:43:40	
36	Anna Drabenya	Belarus (BLR)	1:44:16	
37	Ingrid Hernández	Colombia (COL)	1:44:38	
38	Miriam Ramón	Ecuador (ECU)	1:44:57	
39	Agnieszka Dygacz	Poland (POL)	1:45:24	
40	Cristina López	El Salvador (ESA)	1:45:43	
41	Laura Reynolds	Ireland (IRL)	1:46:10	
42	Angelica Hernández	Mexico (MEX)	1:46:14	
43	Johana Ordóñez	Ecuador (ECU)	1:46:56	
44	Tatyana Mineeva	Russia (RUS)	1:47:05	
45	Lucie Pelantová	Czech Republic (CZE)	1:47:11	
46	Jo Jackson	Great Britain (GBR)	1:47:12	
47	Solomiya Login	United States (USA)	1:47:43	
48	Milanggela Rosales	Venezuela (VEN)	1:48:12	
49	Mónica Equihua	Mexico (MEX)	1:50:45	
50	Agnieszka Szwarnóg	Poland (POL)	1:51:51	
—	Cheryl Webb	Australia (AUS)	DQ	
—	Claudia Cornejo	Bolivia (BOL)	DQ	
—	Verónica Colindres	El Salvador (ESA)	DQ	
—	Cisiane Lopes BRA	DNF		
—	Sandra Zapata	Colombia (COL)	DNF	
—	Paola Pérez	Ecuador (ECU)	DNF	
—	Eszter Gerendási	Hungary (HUN)	DNF	
—	Anett Torma	Hungary (HUN)	DNF	
—	María Esther Sánchez	Mexico (MEX)	DNF	
—	Tatyana Sibileva	Russia (RUS)	DNF	
—	Maria Czaková	Slovakia (SVK)	DNF	
—	Chaima Trabelsi	Tunisia (TUN)	DNF	
—	Stephanie Casey	United States (USA)	DNF	
—	Miranda Melville	United States (USA)	DNF	

==== Team (20km Women) ====
Place	Country	Points
1st place, gold medalist(s)	Portugal	13 pts
2nd place, silver medalist(s)	Spain	22 pts
3rd place, bronze medalist(s)	China	32 pts
4	Russia	33 pts
5	Japan	53 pts
6	Mexico	90 pts
7	Ecuador	106 pts
8	Poland	110 pts

=== Women's 10 km Junior ===
Place	Athlete	Nation	Time	Notes
1st place, gold medalist(s)	Antonella Palmisano	Italy (ITA)	47:52	
2nd place, silver medalist(s)	He Qin	China (CHN)	47:57	
3rd place, bronze medalist(s)	Anna Lukyanova	Russia (RUS)	48:00	
4	Zhao Jing	China (CHN)	48:03	
5	Svetlana Vasilyeva	Russia (RUS)	48:35	
6	Nina Ochotnikova	Russia (RUS)	49:02	
7	Zhang Ting	China (CHN)	49:39	
8	Alejandra Ortega	Mexico (MEX)	49:49	
9	Sandra Nevarez	Mexico (MEX)	50:23	
10	Sara Alonso	Spain (ESP)	50:29	
11	Federica Curiazzi	Italy (ITA)	50:45	
12	Beth Alexander	Australia (AUS)	50:56	
13	Inès Pastorino	France (FRA)	51:00	
14	Emilie Menuet	France (FRA)	51:08	
15	Regan Lambie	Australia (AUS)	51:16	
16	Berta Kriván	Hungary (HUN)	52:23	
17	Paula Martínez	Spain (ESP)	52:49	
18	Wendy Cornejo	Bolivia (BOL)	52:50	
19	Cecilia Stetskiv	Italy (ITA)	53:30	
20	Cornelia Swart	South Africa (RSA)	53:43	
21	Georgiana Enache	Romania (ROU)	53:51	
22	Kimberly García	Peru (PER)	54:02	
23	Sandra Yerga	Spain (ESP)	54:06	
24	Linda Paz	El Salvador (ESA)	54:07	
25	Amandine Marcou	France (FRA)	54:51	
26	Magdalena Jasińska	Poland (POL)	54:59	
27	Rachel Tallent	Australia (AUS)	56:19	
28	Katarzyna Korzeniowska	Poland (POL)	56:32	
29	Myrna García	Peru (PER)	57:25	
30	Josefine Klausen	Denmark (DEN)	58:28	
—	Mariana Geldis	Mexico (MEX)	DNF	

==== Team (10km Women Junior) ====
Place	Country	Points
1st place, gold medalist(s)	China	6 pts
2nd place, silver medalist(s)	Russia	8 pts
3rd place, bronze medalist(s)	Italy	12 pts
4	Mexico	17 pts
5	France	27 pts
6	Australia	27 pts
7	Spain	27 pts
8	Peru	51 pts
9	Poland	54 pts

== Participation ==
The participation of 264 athletes (169 men/95 women) from 42 countries is reported.

- Australia (9/6)
- Belarus (-/1)
- Bolivia (-/3)
- Brazil (3/2)
- Canada (3/-)
- Chile (2/-)
- China (13/8)
- Colombia (7/3)
- Costa Rica (2/-)
- Czech Republic (3/2)
- Denmark (-/1)
- Ecuador (8/4)
- El Salvador (3/3)
- Finland (1/-)
- France (12/4)
- Guatemala (3/-)
- Hungary (5/4)
- Ireland (1/1)
- Italy (12/3)
- Japan (4/3)
- Lithuania (-/2)
- Mexico (12/7)
- Netherlands (2/-)
- New Zealand (1/-)
- Norway (1/-)
- Peru (-/2)
- Poland (8/5)
- Portugal (7/4)
- Puerto Rico (1/-)
- Romania (-/1)
- Russia (12/8)
- Slovakia (4/1)
- Slovenia (1/-)
- South Africa (1/1)
- Spain (13/8)
- Sweden (3/-)
- Switzerland (-/1)
- Tunisia (2/1)
- Turkey (1/-)
- United Kingdom (-/1)
- United States (8/3)
- Venezuela (-/1)
