= Athletics at the 2007 Pan American Games – Women's 20 kilometres walk =

Women's 20 kilometres walk at the Pan American Games

The women's 20 kilometres walk event at the 2007 Pan American Games in Rio de Janeiro was held on July 22.

== Results ==
Rank	Name	Nationality	Time	Notes
1st place, gold medalist(s)	Cristina López	El Salvador	1:38:59	
2nd place, silver medalist(s)	Miriam Ramón	Ecuador	1:40:03	
3rd place, bronze medalist(s)	María Esther Sánchez	Mexico	1:41:47	
4	Tânia Spindler	Brazil	1:42:15	
5	Rosario Sánchez	Mexico	1:42:47	
6	Sandra Zapata	Colombia	1:43:44	
7	Yadira Guamán	Ecuador	1:46:06	
	Cisiane Lopes	Brazil	DNF	
	Glenda Ubeda	Nicaragua	DNF	
	Verónica Colindres	El Salvador	DQ	
	Geovana Irusta	Bolivia	DQ	
	Jolene Moore	United States	DQ	
	Evelin Nuñez	Guatemala	DQ	
	Leyci Rodríguez	Cuba	DQ	
	Teresa Vaill	United States	DQ	
