= Athletics at the 2011 Pan American Games – Women's 20 kilometres walk =

Women's 20 kilometres walk at the 2011 Pan American Games
- Venue: Guadalajara Circuit and Route
- Dates: October 23
- Competitors: 17 from 9 nations
- Winning time: 1:32:38

Medalists
Gold medal	Jamy Franco	Guatemala
Silver medal	Mirna Ortiz	Guatemala
Bronze medal	Ingrid Hernández	Colombia

The women's 20 kilometres walk competition of the athletics events at the 2011 Pan American Games took place on the 23 of October at the Guadalajara Circuit and Route. The defending Pan American Games champion is Cristina López of El Salvador.

== Records ==
World record	Vera Sokolova (RUS)	1:25:08	Sochi, Russia	February 26, 2011
Pan American Games record	Graciela Mendoza (MEX)	1:34:19	Winnipeg, Canada	July 26, 1999

== Qualification standards ==
This event did not require any qualification standard be met.

== Schedule ==
Date	Time	Round
October 23, 2011	08:30	Final

== Abbreviations ==
- All times shown are in hours:minutes:seconds

DNF	did not finish
PR	pan American games record
WR	world record
DQ	disqualified
NR	national record
PB	personal best
SB	season best

== Results ==
17 athletes from 9 countries competed.

=== Final ===
Rank	Rider	Time	Notes
1st place, gold medalist(s)	Jamy Franco (GUA)	1:32:38	GR
2nd place, silver medalist(s)	Mirna Ortiz (GUA)	1:33:37	PB
3rd place, bronze medalist(s)	Ingrid Hernández (COL)	1:34:06	
4	Mónica Equihua (MEX)	1:34:50	PB
5	Rosalia Ortiz (MEX)	1:36:10	PB
6	Arabelly Orjuela (COL)	1:36:50	
7	Claudia Balderrama (BOL)	1:37:32	PB
8	Yadira Guamán (ECU)	1:38:42	
9	Maria Michta-Coffey (USA)	1:38:47	
10	Geovana Irusta (BOL)	1:41:43	PB
11	Milangela Rosales (VEN)	1:43:17	
12	Farilus Morales (PER)	1:45:38	
–	Lauren Forgues (USA)		DNF
–	Cisiane Lopes (BRA)		DNF
–	Paola Pérez (ECU)		DQ
–	Leisy Rodriguez (CUB)		DQ
–	Érica de Sena (BRA)		DQ
