= Boy Culture: The Soundtrack =

Soundtrack album to the 2007 film Boy Culture

Soundtrack album by various artists
- Released: April 2007
- Label: Peace Bisquit
- Producer: Ryan Beveridge

Boy Culture: The Soundtrack is the soundtrack to the 2007 gay drama/romance film Boy Culture. It contains songs from the film as well as the film's score composed by Ryan Beveridge. It was released exclusively on iTunes in April, 2007.

== Track listing ==
1. 12 Disciples – Ryan Beveridge
2. Champagne – Amanda Lepore
3. Do U Damage – The Specimen
4. Hey Kinky – Fuzz Townsend & Sophia Lolley
5. Ride (Blend Mix Edit) – Colours featuring Elisa Burchett
6. Don't Get Me Started – Daisy Spurs
7. 3am – Wideband Network
8. Diamonds Make You Happy – The Grand Royals featuring Jill Jones
9. John and Andy Flashback – Ryan Beveridge
10. Call Me X – Ryan Beveridge
11. Last Chance for Love (Welcome Mix Edit) – Joi Cardwell
12. Take Me Up (Eric Kupper Mix Radio Edit) – Barton
13. Show Me Love (Sand In My Shoes Mix Edit) – Wideband Network
14. Making the Grade – Neoverse & C-Dock
15. Joey Flashback – Ryan Beveridge
16. Gregory & Renaldo – Ryan Beveridge
17. The Things I Need to Hear – Ari Gold
18. What's Sexy? (Good and Evil Mix) – Chris Willis
19. 95 – Wideband Network
20. Drowning In the Clear - Ryan Beveridge featuring Stephanie Casey
21. Andrew, Gregory and Blondie – Ryan Beveridge
22. Dinner with Carol – Rodney Lee
