= Allan Segura =

Costa Rican race walker

Personal information
- Full name: Allan Francisco Segura Medina
- Nationality: Costa Rica
- Born: 23 December 1980 (age 45) Curridabat, San José, Costa Rica
- Height: 1.70 m (5 ft 7 in)
- Weight: 64 kg (141 lb)

Sport
- Sport: Athletics
- Event: Race walking
Medal record
Men's athletics
Representing Costa Rica
Central American Games
Gold medal – first place	2013 San José	20 km walk
Gold medal – first place	2010 Panama City	20,000 m
Bronze medal – third place	2001 Guatemala City	20,000 m
CAC Championships
Gold medal – first place	2011 Mayagüez	20,000 m
Silver medal – second place	2009 Havana	20,000 m
Bronze medal – third place	2008 Cali	20,000 m
Bronze medal – third place	2013 Morelia	20 km walk
- Updated on 25 December 2014

Allan Francisco Segura Medina (born 23 December 1980) is a Costa Rican race walker. He represented Costa Rica at the 2008 Summer Olympics in Beijing, where he became the nation's flag bearer at the opening ceremony. He competed in the men's 20 km race walk, where he finished in thirty-ninth place, with a time of 1:27:10. Segura achieved his best result in race walking, when he finished thirty-second at the 2008 IAAF World Race Walking Cup in Cheboksary, Russia, with the fastest possible time of 1:23:12.

== Personal bests ==
=== Track walk ===
- 20,000 m: 1:25:06.83 hrs – San José, Costa Rica, 26 June 2011

=== Road walk ===
- 20 km: 1:23:12 hrs – Cheboksary, Russia, 10 May 2008
- 50 km: 4:25:15 hrs – Chihuahua, Mexico, 22 February 2014

== Achievements ==
Year	Competition	Venue	Position	Event	Notes
Representing the Costa Rica
2001	Central American Games	Guatemala City, Guatemala	3rd	20 km	1:33:54
2002	Ibero-American Championships	Guatemala City, Guatemala	10th	20,000m walk	1:34:29
2002	Central American Championships	San José, Costa Rica	1st	20,000m track walk	1:37:51.67
2003	Central American Championships	Guatemala City, Guatemala	1st	20,000m track walk	1:32:44.90
2003	World Championships	Saint-Denis, France	28th	20 km	1:30:53
2004	Ibero-American Championships	Huelva, Spain	8th	20,000m track walk	1:30:46.7
2004	Central American Championships	Managua, Nicaragua	1st	20,000m track walk	1:31:51.30
2005	Central American Championships	San José, Costa Rica	3rd	20,000m track walk	1:31:13.95
2006	World Race Walking Cup	A Coruña, Spain	58th	20 km	1:27:53
2006	Ibero-American Championships	Ponce, Puerto Rico	4th	20,000m track walk	1:34:31.85
2006	Central American and Caribbean Games	Cartagena, Colombia	7th	20 km	1:47:00
2007	Central American Race Walking Cup	Guatemala City, Guatemala	1st	20 km	1:22:53
2007	Central American Championships	San José, Costa Rica	2nd	20,000m track walk	1:27:16.12
2007	NACAC Championships	San Salvador, El Salvador	3rd	20,000m walk	1:29:50
2007	Pan American Games	Rio de Janeiro, Brazil	6th	20 km	1:32:27
2008	World Race Walking Cup	Cheboksary, Russia	32nd	20 km	1:23:12
2008	Central American and Caribbean Championships	Cali, Colombia	3rd	20,000m track walk	1:27:57.2
2008	Olympic Games	Beijing, China	39th	20 km	1:27:10
2009	Pan American Race Walking Cup	San Salvador, El Salvador	10th	20 km	1:29:06
2009	Central American Championships	Guatemala City, Guatemala	2nd	20,000m track walk	1:27:39.56
2009	Central American and Caribbean Championships	Havana, Cuba	2nd	20 km	1:34:58
2009	World Championships	Berlin, Germany	41st	20 km	1:29:52
2010	Central American Games	Panama City, Panama	1st	20,000m track walk	1:34:12.15
2010	World Race Walking Cup	Chihuahua, Mexico	34th	20 km	1:28:25
2010	Ibero-American Championships	San Fernando, Spain	5th	20,000m walk	1:27:51.5 (ht)
2010	Central American and Caribbean Games	Mayagüez, Puerto Rico	6th	20 km	1:28:49
2010	Central American Championships	Guatemala City, Guatemala	1st	20,000m track walk	1:26:44.45
2011	Central American Race Walking Cup	San Salvador, El Salvador	3rd	20 km	1:26:30
2011	Central American Championships	San José, Costa Rica	1st	20,000m track walk	1:25:06.83
2011	Central American and Caribbean Championships	Mayagüez, Puerto Rico	1st	20,000m track walk	1:28.56.08
2011	Pan American Games	Guadalajara, Mexico	—	20 km	DQ
2011	Pan American Games	Guadalajara, Mexico	—	50 km	DNF
2012	World Race Walking Cup	Saransk, Russia	83rd	20 km	1:31:21
2012	Central American Championships	Managua, Nicaragua	3rd	20,000m track walk	1:33:23.96
2013	Central American Race Walking Cup	Guatemala City, Guatemala	1st	20 km	1:38:52
2013	Central American Games	San José, Costa Rica	1st	20 km	1:28:43
2013	Pan American Race Walking Cup	Guatemala City, Guatemala	17th	20 km	1:32:41
2013	Pan American Race Walking Cup	Guatemala City, Guatemala	5th	Team (20 km)	73 pts
2013	Central American Championships	Managua, Nicaragua	1st	20,000m track walk	1:33:40.28
2013	Central American and Caribbean Championships	Morelia, Mexico	3rd	20 km	1:39:14
2014	World Race Walking Challenge	Chihuahua, Mexico	12th	50 km	4:25:15
2014	World Race Walking Cup	Taicang, China	—	50 km	DNF
2014	Central American Championships	Tegucigalpa, Honduras	4th	20,000m track walk	1:33:39.74
2014	Central American and Caribbean Games	Xalapa, Mexico	—	50 km	DNF
2015	Pan American Race Walking Cup	Arica, Chile	29th	20 km	1:35:23
