= James Rendón =

Colombian race walker

Personal information
- Full name: James Aurelio Rendón Villegas
- Born: 7 April 1985 (age 41) Fresno, Tolima, Colombia
- Height: 1.70 m (5 ft 7 in)
- Weight: 60 kg (130 lb)

Sport
- Country: Colombia
- Sport: Athletics
- Event: Race walking
Medal record
Representing Colombia
Men's athletics
Pan American Games
Silver medal – second place	2011 Guadalajara	20 km walk
South American Championships
Gold medal – first place	2007 São Paulo	20,000 m walk
- Updated on 13 May 2025

James Aurelio Rendón Villegas (born 7 April 1985 in Fresno, Tolima) is a male race walker from Colombia. He represented his country in the 20 km walk at the 2008 Summer Olympics and at the 2012 London Olympics.

He was the runner-up in the 20 km race at the 2012 South American Race Walking Championships, finishing behind Caio Bonfim.

== Personal bests ==
Event	Result	Venue	Date
Road walk
10 km	44:33 min A	Moniquirá, Colombia	7 March 2004
20 km	1:21:40 hrs A	Cali, Colombia	27 November 2008
50 km	3:47:41 hrs A	Valley Cottage, United States	14 September 2014
Track walk
10,000 m	42:38.5 min A (ht)	Bogotá, Colombia	8 October 2011
20,000 m	1:21:13.6 hrs (ht)	Buenos Aires, Argentina	5 June 2011

== International competitions ==
Year	Competition	Venue	Position	Event	Notes
Representing Colombia
2002	South American Race Walking Championships	Puerto Saavedra, Chile	7th	Youth 10 km	50:05
2002	South American Youth Championships	Asunción, Paraguay	3rd	10,000m	47:08.38
2004	South American Race Walking Championships	Los Ángeles, Bío Bío, Chile	–	Junior 10 km	DQ
2004	World Race Walking Cup	Naumburg, Germany	36th	Junior 10 km	46:23
2006	South American Race Walking Championships	Cochabamba, Bolivia	3rd	20 km	1:28:20
2006	South American Race Walking Championships	Cochabamba, Bolivia	1st	Team (20 km)	9 pts
2006	World Race Walking Cup	A Coruña, Spain	35th	20 km	1:25:09
2006	World Race Walking Cup	A Coruña, Spain	11th	Team (20 km)	130 pts
2006	South American Championships	Tunja, Colombia	–	20,000m	DQ
2006	South American U23 Championships / South American Games	Buenos Aires, Argentina	1st	20 km	1:28:05
2007	Pan American Race Walking Cup	Balneário Camboriú, Brazil	7th	20 km	1:32:35
2007	Pan American Race Walking Cup	Balneário Camboriú, Brazil	1st	Team (20 km)	13 pts
2007	South American Championships	São Paulo, Brazil	1st	20,000m	1:24:25.4
2008	South American Race Walking Championships	Cuenca, Ecuador	3rd	20 km	1:27:07 A
2008	South American Race Walking Championships	Cuenca, Ecuador	1st	Team (20 km)	10 pts
2008	World Race Walking Cup	Cheboksary, Russia	24th	20 km	1:22:34
2008	World Race Walking Cup	Cheboksary, Russia	9th	Team (20 km)	88 pts
2008	Central American and Caribbean Championships	Cali, Colombia	1st	20,000m	1:25:22.67 A
2008	Olympic Games	Beijing, China	31st	20 km	1:24:41
2009	Pan American Race Walking Cup	San Salvador, El Salvador	2nd	20 km	1:23:21
2009	Pan American Race Walking Cup	San Salvador, El Salvador	2nd	Team (20 km)	14 pts
2009	South American Championships	Lima, Peru	–	20,000m	DQ
2011	Pan American Race Walking Cup	Envigado, Colombia	–	20 km	DQ
2011	South American Championships	Buenos Aires, Argentina	5th	20,000m	1:21:13.6
2011	World Championships	Daegu, South Korea	19th	20 km	1:24:08
2011	Pan American Games	Guadalajara, Mexico	2nd	20 km	1:22.46
2012	South American Race Walking Championships	Salinas, Ecuador	2nd	20 km	1:24:05.4
2012	World Race Walking Cup	Saransk, Russia	30th	20 km	1:23:43
2012	World Race Walking Cup	Saransk, Russia	8th	Team (20 km)	92 pts
2012	Ibero-American Championships	Barquisimeto, Venezuela	1st	20,000m	1:26:12.03
2012	Olympic Games	London, United Kingdom	28th	20 km	1:22:54
2013	Pan American Race Walking Cup	Guatemala City, Guatemala	9th	20 km	1:28:05 A
2014	Ibero-American Championships	São Paulo, Brazil	–	20,000m	DQ
2014	Central American and Caribbean Games	Xalapa, Mexico	–	50 km	DNF
2015	Pan American Race Walking Cup	Arica, Chile	3rd	50 km	3:50:47
2015	Pan American Race Walking Cup	Arica, Chile	2nd	Team (50 km)	27 pts
2018	South American Games	Cochabamba, Bolivia	–	50 km	DNF
