= 2009 Central American Championships in Athletics =

XX Central American Championships in Athletics
- Dates: June 12–13
- Host city: Guatemala City, Guatemala
- Venue: Estadio Cementos Progreso
- Level: Senior
- Events: 40 (21 men, 19 women)
- Participation: 163 athletes from 7 nations

The 20th Central American Championships in Athletics were held at the Estadio Cementos Progreso in Guatemala City, Guatemala, between June 12–13, 2009.

A total of 40 events were contested, 21 by men and 19 by women.

== Medal summary ==
Complete results and medal winners were published.

=== Men ===
Event	Gold		Silver		Bronze	
100 metres (wind: NWI)	Rolando Palacios (HON)	10.38	Bryan Brown (CRC)	10.60	Josef Norales (HON)	10.86
200 metres (wind: NWI)	Rolando Palacios (HON)	20.99 CR	Gary Robinson (CRC)	21.43	Renán Palma (ESA)	21.59
400 metres	Hans Villagrán (GUA)	47.77	Pedro Miguel Suazo (HON)	48.19	Víctor Cantillano (CRC)	48.31
800 metres	Marco Pérez (CRC)	1:54.93	Arnoldo Monge (CRC)	1:55.86	Edgar Cortés (NCA)	1:56.47
1500 metres	Erick Rodríguez (NCA)	3:58.92	José Carlos Raxón (GUA)	3:59.43	Estuardo Palacios (GUA)	4:01.97
5000 metres	José Amado García (GUA)	14:55.44	Jeremías Saloj (GUA)	14:55.72	José Carlos Raxón (GUA)	15:07.59
10,000 metres	Jeremías Saloj (GUA)	31:12.39	William Chamán (GUA)	32:46.74	William Sánchez (ESA)	37:17.32
110 metres hurdles (wind: -0.4 m/s)	Ronald Bennett (HON)	14.14 CR	Jonathan Williams (BIZ)	14.23	Renán Palma (ESA)	14.59
400 metres hurdles	Jonathan Williams (BIZ)	49.73 CR	Allan Ayala (GUA)	50.16	Camilo Quevedo (GUA)	52.84
3000 metres steeplechase	Erick Rodríguez (NCA)	9:35.44	Dolman Barrios (GUA)	9:51.16	Domingo Alvarez (GUA)	10:00.23
20000 m walk	Walter Sandoval (ESA)	1:25:19.91 CR, NR	Allan Segura (CRC)	1:27:39.56	Ricardo Reyes (ESA)	1:27:48.29
4 x 100 metres relay	Honduras; Ronald Bennett; Pedro Miguel Suazo; Rolando Palacios; Josef Norales	41.03 CR	Costa Rica	41.46		
4 x 400 metres relay	Guatemala	3:14.00	Costa Rica	3:14.03	Honduras	3:22.17
High jump	Henry Linton (CRC)	2.05	Byron Nolberto (GUA)	1.95	Marlon Colorado (ESA)	1.95
Long jump	Jonathan Romero (PAN)	7.41 (wind: 0.0 m/s)	Kessel Campbell (HON)	7.35 (wind: 0.0 m/s)	Jason Castro (HON)	7.06 (wind: 1.0 m/s)
Triple jump	Jason Castro (HON)	15.49 CR (wind: NWI)	Juan Carlos Nájera (GUA)	15.32 (wind: NWI)	Jonathan Romero (PAN)	15.28 (wind: NWI)
Shot put	Henry Santos (GUA)	14.74	Roberto Sawyers (CRC)	14.68	Luis Folgar (GUA)	14.38
Discus throw	Roberto Sawyers (CRC)	48.39 CR	Raúl Rivera (GUA)	44.69	Winston Campbell (HON)	44.49
Hammer throw	Raúl Rivera (GUA)	64.73 CR	Roberto Sawyers (CRC)	64.13	Diego Berrios (GUA)	55.27
Javelin throw	Rigoberto Calderón (NCA)	65.42	Kenley Olivas (NCA)	63.75	Luis Taracena (GUA)	60.25
Decathlon	Darvin Colón (HON)	6279	Marco Rodríguez (ESA)	4936	Allan Bustillo (HON)	4768

=== Women ===
Event	Gold		Silver		Bronze	
100 metres (wind: NWI)	Kaina Martínez (BIZ)	11.98 CR	Sharolyn Scott (CRC)	12.05	Mariela Leal (CRC)	12.20
200 metres (wind: NWI)	Sharolyn Scott (CRC)	24.75	Mariela Leal (CRC)	25.11	Shantely Scott (CRC)	25.17
400 metres	Fátima Castro (ESA)	57.32	Tamara Quintanilla (ESA)	57.39	Jessica Aguilera (NCA)	58.25
800 metres	Gladys Landaverde (ESA)	2:16.08	Wendy Zúñiga (CRC)	2:17.00	Cecilia Gutiérrez (GUA)	2:17.94
1500 metres	Gladys Landaverde (ESA)	4:49.12	Cecilia Gutiérrez (GUA)	4:49.58	Wendy Zúñiga (CRC)	4:50.33
5000 metres	Elida De Xuyá (GUA)	18:17.31	Imelda Bac (GUA)	18:19.30	Elsa Monterroso (GUA)	18:23.77
100 metres hurdles (wind: 0.5 m/s)	Jeimmy Bernárdez (HON)	14.32	Ana María Porras (CRC)	14.92	Claudia Marisol Villeda (GUA)	15.48
400 metres hurdles	Ana María Porras (CRC)	63.61	Bessy Flores (ESA)	66.02	Iris Santamaría (ESA)	68.47
3000 metres steeplechase^{†}	Evonne Marroquín (GUA)	11:35.24	Blanca Solís (ESA)	12:29.34		
4 x 100 metres relay	Costa Rica; Sharolyn Scott Mariela Leal; Shantely Scott	47.61 CR	El Salvador; Bessy Flores; Tamara Quintanilla; Fátima Castro; Gladys Landaverde	48.80	Belize	49.80
4 x 400 metres relay	Costa Rica	3:52.31	El Salvador; Iris Santamaría; Fátima Castro; Tamara Quintanilla; Gladys Landaverde	3:55.99	Nicaragua	4:01.14
10,000 metres Walk	Cristina López (ESA)	47:35.35 CR	Verónica Colindres (ESA)	49:46.02	Jamy Franco (GUA)	49:53.75
Long jump	Ana María Porras (CRC)	5.54 (wind: 0.1 m/s)	Tricia Flores (BIZ)	5.43 (wind: 0.2 m/s)	Aneliesse Aldana (GUA)	5.26 (wind: 0.8 m/s)
Triple jump	Estefany Cruz (GUA)	12.09 (wind: NWI)	Ana Lucía Camargo (GUA)	11.52 (wind: NWI)	Kay-De Vaughn (BIZ)	11.34 (wind: NWI)
Shot put	Doroty López (GUA)	12.80	Stephanie Zúñiga (CRC)	10.55	Silvia Piñar (CRC)	10.49
Discus throw	Doroty López (GUA)	42.97	Silvia Piñar (CRC)	37.59	Viviana Abarca (CRC)	35.91
Hammer throw	Rosita De León (GUA)	48.45	Viviana Abarca (CRC)	43.54	Silvia Piñar (CRC)	36.91
Javelin throw^{†}	Ginna von Quednow (GUA)	42.24	Génova Arias (CRC)	40.34	Adriana Morales (GUA)	38.80
Heptathlon	Alejandra Gómez (CRC)	3988	Ruth Morales (GUA)	3582	Andrea Melgar (ESA)	3511

==== Note ====
^{†}: Event with no points for the team rankings because of the low number of participants.

== Medal table (unofficial) ==
* Host nation (Guatemala)

Rank	Nation	Gold	Silver	Bronze	Total
1	Guatemala*	13	12	13	38
2	Costa Rica	9	16	7	32
3	Honduras	7	2	5	14
4	El Salvador	5	7	7	19
5	Nicaragua	3	1	3	7
6	Belize	2	2	2	6
7	Panama	1	0	1	2
Totals (7 entries)		40	40	38	118

== Team Rankings ==
Guatemala won the overall team ranking and the team ranking in the men's category. Costa Rica won the team ranking in the women's category

=== Total ===
The host country is highlighted in lavender blue

Rank	Nation	Points
1st place, gold medalist(s)	Guatemala	127
2nd place, silver medalist(s)	Costa Rica	104
3rd place, bronze medalist(s)	El Salvador	63
4	Honduras	51
5	Nicaragua	28
6	Belize	23
7	Panama	7

=== Male ===
The host country is highlighted in lavender blue

Rank	Nation	Points
1st place, gold medalist(s)	Guatemala	78
2nd place, silver medalist(s)	Honduras	46
3rd place, bronze medalist(s)	Costa Rica	43
4	El Salvador	22
4	Nicaragua	22
6	Belize	9
7	Panama	7

=== Female ===
The host country is highlighted in lavender blue

Rank	Nation	Points
1st place, gold medalist(s)	Costa Rica	61
2nd place, silver medalist(s)	Guatemala	49
3rd place, bronze medalist(s)	El Salvador	41
4	Belize	14
5	Nicaragua	6
6	Honduras	5

== Participation ==
A total of 163 athletes from 7 countries were reported to participate:

- Belize (10)
- Costa Rica (29)
- El Salvador (34)
- Guatemala (56)
- Honduras (15)
- Nicaragua (19)
- (Panama) Panamá (1)
