= Athletics at the 2019 Pan American Games – Women's 50 kilometres walk =

Women's 50 kilometres walk at the 2019 Pan American Games
- Venue: Parque Kennedy
- Dates: August 11
- Competitors: 10 from 5 nations
- Winning time: 4:11:12

Medalists
Gold medal	Johana Ordóñez	Ecuador
Silver medal	Mirna Ortiz	Guatemala
Bronze medal	Paola Pérez	Ecuador

The women's 50 kilometres walk competition of the athletics events at the 2019 Pan American Games took place on 11 August on a temporary circuit around the Parque Kennedy in Lima, Peru.

== Records ==
World Record	Liang Rui (CHN)	4:04:36	Taicang, China	May 5, 2018

== Schedule ==
Date	Time	Round
August 11, 2019	7:00	Final

== Abbreviations ==
- All times shown are in hours:minutes:seconds

KEY:	q	Fastest non-qualifiers	Q	Qualified	NR	National record	PB	Personal best	SB	Seasonal best	DQ	Disqualified

== Results ==
The results were as follows:

Rank	Athlete	Nation	Time	Notes
1st place, gold medalist(s)	Johana Ordóñez	Ecuador	4:11:12	AR, GR
2nd place, silver medalist(s)	Mirna Ortiz	Guatemala	4:15:21	
3rd place, bronze medalist(s)	Paola Pérez	Ecuador	4:16:54	
4	Viviane Lyra	Brazil	4:22:46	PB
5	Elianay da Silva	Brazil	4:29:33	PB
6	Mayra Herrera	Guatemala	4:30:52	SB
7	Yoci Caballero	Peru	4:31:33	PB
8	Evelyn Inga	Peru	4:36:36	
9	Stephanie Casey	United States	4:50:31	
	Katie Burnett	United States	DNF	
