= Mirna Ortiz =

Guatemalan racewalker (born 1987)

Personal information
- Full name: Mirna Sucely Ortiz Flores
- Born: 28 February 1987 (age 39) Ciudad de Guatemala, Guatemala
- Height: 1.58 m (5 ft 2 in)
- Weight: 44 kg (97 lb)

Sport
- Country: Guatemala
- Sport: Athletics
- Event: Race walking
- Coached by: Rigoberto Medina
Medal record
Women's athletics
Representing Guatemala
NACAC Championships
Silver medal – second place	2025 Freeport	20,000 m walk
Pan American Games
Silver medal – second place	2011 Guadalajara	20 km walk
Silver medal – second place	2019 Lima	50 km walk
Bolivarian Games
Gold medal – first place	2013 Trujillo	20 km walk
- Updated on 5 January 2015

Mirna Sucely Ortiz Flores (born 28 February 1987) is a Guatemalan racewalker.

Having begun in the sport in 1998, she won a Central American youth title in 2000, and was a promising young athlete in her discipline, but had to abandon the sport at the age of 14 due to financial hardship. She then returned to a competitive level in 2011, urged by coach Rigoberto Medina. Her return proved to be fruitful as in September 2011 she earned second place in the National Polish Championship in Varsovia, thereby qualifying for the 2012 Summer Olympic, and a few weeks later she won the silver medal at the 2011 Pan American Games, behind her compatriot Jamy Franco in a race they both led from start to end.

On 18 March 2012 she set the 20 km record for the North, Central American, and Caribbean region at 1:28:54 at the Memorial Mario Albisetti in Lugano, Switzerland, where she came in second.

In the 2012 Olympic games in London she competed in the 20 km walk along the other two women of the Guatemala racewalking team, Jamy Franco and Mayra Herrera but was disqualified after 8 km.

After the World Championships that took place in Moscow in August 2013, she married compatriot racewalker Érick Barrondo.

She has qualified to represent Guatemala at the 2020 Summer Olympics. She was the flag bearer for Guatemala during the Parade of Nations.

== Personal bests ==
Event	Result	Venue	Date
Road walk
10 km	43:09 min	(Poland) Katowice	13 Sep 2014
20 km	1:28:31 hrs	(Portugal) Rio Maior	6 Apr 2013
Track walk
10,000 m	51:52.89 min	Ciudad de Guatemala	12 Jun 2009

== International competitions ==
Year	Competition	Venue	Position	Event	Notes
Representing the Guatemala
2003	Central American Junior Championships	San José, Costa Rica	1st	5000 m	26:56.06
2009	Central American Race Walking Cup	San Salvador, El Salvador	3rd	10 km	51:23
2009	Pan American Race Walking Cup	San Salvador, El Salvador	9th	20 km	1:47:01
2009	Pan American Race Walking Cup	San Salvador, El Salvador	2nd	Team (20 km)	22 pts
2009	Central American Championships	Ciudad de Guatemala, Guatemala	5th	10,000 m	51:52.89
2011	Central American Race Walking Cup	San Salvador, El Salvador	2nd	20 km	1:39:52
2011	Pan American Race Walking Cup	Envigado, Colombia	13th	20 km	1:41:34
2011	Pan American Games	Guadalajara, Mexico	2nd	20 km	1:33:37
2012	World Race Walking Cup	Saransk, Russia	—	20 km	DQ
2012	Olympic Games	London, United Kingdom	—	20 km	DQ
2013	World Championships	Moscow, Russia	—	20 km	DQ
2013	Bolivarian Games	Trujillo, Peru	1st	20 km	1:34:07
2014	South American Race Walking Championships	Cochabamba, Bolivia	6th	20 km	1:39:32
2014	World Race Walking Cup	Taicang, China	26th	20 km	1:30:18
2014	World Race Walking Cup	Taicang, China	8th	Team (20 km)	104 pts
2014	Central American and Caribbean Games	Xalapa, Mexico	1st	20 km	1:35:43 A
2015	Pan American Race Walking Cup	Arica, Chile	3rd	20 km	1:31:31
2015	Pan American Race Walking Cup	Arica, Chile	2nd	Team (20 km)	21 pts
2015	World Championships	Beijing, China	12th	20 km walk	1:31:32
2025	NACAC Championships	Freeport, Bahamas	2nd	20,000 m	1:37:52.58
