= Emerson Hernández =

Salvadoran race walker (born 1989)

Emerson Esnal Hernández
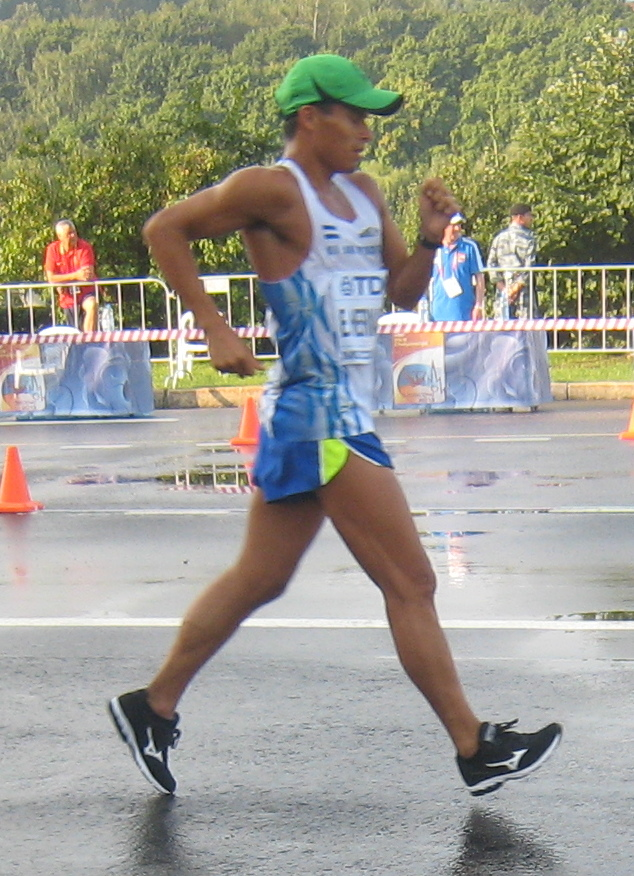
- Hernández in 2013

Personal information
- Born: 29 January 1989 (age 37) San Salvador, El Salvador
- Height: 1.67 m (5 ft 5 1/2 in)
- Weight: 61 kg (134 lb)

Sport
- Country: El Salvador
- Sport: Athletics
- Event: Race walking
- Updated on 14 May 2014

Emerson Esnal Hernández (born 29 January 1989) is a Salvadoran race walker. He began racing after a team of sports recruiters selected his best friend to try out, Hernández accompanied his friend, and one of the coaches at the try out noticed him. He represented El Salvador in the 50 km race walk at the 2012 Summer Olympics in London.

== Biography ==
Emerson Esnal Hernández was born in San Salvador, El Salvador on 29 January 1989, one of seven children of Juana Dolores Hernández. Hernández became involved with the sport of race walking when a group from the National Sports Institute of El Salvador visited his school looking for recruits. The team recruited Hernández's best friend Rafael Avalos, and Hernández accompanied him because Rafael was shy. They were taken to a stadium, where Hernández was noticed by a coach and entered training in athletics.

At age 13 Hernández began to train with coach Rafael Cerna, and only five months after beginning training Hernández won first place in a cross country race. By 2003 he had qualified for the World Junior Championships and in 2005 won a gold medal in the El Salvador National Championships. In the 2007 Pan American Race Walking Cup, he took 4th place in the Junior Men's 10 km race walk. During the early years of his athletic career, he continued his academic studies and in 2008 he graduated with a B.A. in psychology from the Instituto Nacional Alberto Masferrer de la Zacamil. At the 2008 World Youth Athletics Championship, Hernández and his coach were involved in a controversy when the runners in Hernández' race were provided with carbonated water rather than uncarbonated water. Hernández and his coach claimed that this led to nausea, stomach cramps, and dizziness, and led to his withdrawal from the race.

He qualified for the 2010 Central American Games in Puerto Rico, but withdrew due to injury, and in the same year finished 24th in the 50 km race walk at the World Cup in Chihuahua, Mexico. As of 2012, he was ranked 54th in the world in the 50 km runwalk. During the 2011 Pan American Games in Guadalajara, Mexico, he finished in 6th place, eight minutes behind the 5th-place finisher. Hernández qualified to represent El Salvador in the 2012 Olympic Games in London in the 50 km race walk, and traveled to Italy prior to the games for training. There, he has been coached by experienced Italian race walking coach Sandro Damilano, who has trained a number of Chinese and Italian athletes for the Olympics. As of 2012, he was ranked 50th in the world in the 50 km event, and was the highest ranking Salvadoran race walker. At the 2012 Olympics, he finished in 26th place with a new personal best time of 3:53:57.

== Personal bests ==
=== Track walk ===
- 10,000 m: 42:17.56 min – Philadelphia, United States, 26 April 2014

=== Road walk ===
- 10 km: 43:10 min – San Salvador, El Salvador, 3 February 2007
- 20 km: 1:26:34 hrs – Sesto San Giovanni, Italy, 1 May 2013
- 50 km: 3:53:57 hrs – London, United Kingdom, 11 August 2012

== Achievements ==
Year	Competition	Venue	Position	Event	Notes
Representing the El Salvador
2004	Central American Youth Championships	San José, Costa Rica	—	5000 m track walk	DNF
2004	Central American and Caribbean Junior Championships	Coatzacoalcos, Mexico	—	5000 m track walk	DNF
2005	World Youth Championships	Marrakesh, Morocco	11th	10,000 m track walk	46:35.34
2006	World Junior Championships	Beijing, China	18th	10,000 m track walk	46:23.20
2007	Central American Race Walking Cup - Junior	Guatemala City, Guatemala	1st	10 km road walk	44:33
2007	Pan American Race Walking Cup - Junior	Balneário Camboriú, Brazil	4th	10 km road walk	44:30
2007	Central American Junior Championships	San Salvador, El Salvador	1st	10,000 m track walk	44:05.79
2007	Central American Championships	San José, Costa Rica	5th	20,000 m track walk	1:31:01.08
2007	Pan American Junior Championships	São Paulo, Brazil	—	10,000 m track walk	DQ
2008	World Race Walking Cup - Junior	Cheboksary, Russia	18th	10 km road walk	43:18
2008	Central American Race Walking Cup - Junior	Panama City, Panama	1st	10 km road walk	47:07.3
2008	World Junior Championships	Bydgoszcz, Poland	—	10,000 m track walk	DNF
2008	Central American Junior Championships	San Salvador, El Salvador	1st	10,000 m track walk	43:38.08
2009	Central American Race Walking Cup	San Salvador, El Salvador	5th	20 km road walk	1:30:28
2009	Pan American Race Walking Cup	San Salvador, El Salvador	—	50 km road walk	DNF
2010	World Race Walking Cup	Chihuahua, Mexico	24th	50 km road walk	4:06:47
2010	Ibero-American Championships	San Fernando, Spain	—	20,000 m walk	DNF
2010	Central American and Caribbean Games	Mayagüez, Puerto Rico	—	50 km road walk	DNF
2011	Central American Race Walking Cup	San Salvador, El Salvador	1st	35 km road walk	2:48:30
2011	World Championships	Daegu, South Korea	36th	20 km road walk	1:30:48
2011	Pan American Games	Guadalajara, Mexico	6th	50 km road walk	4:12:53
2012	Olympic Games	London, United Kingdom	27th	50 km road walk	3:53:57
2013	World Championships	Moscow, Russia	—	50 km road walk	DQ
2014	World Race Walking Cup	Taicang, China	90th	20 km road walk	1:29:57
