= Athletics at the 2010 South American Games – Women's 20,000 metre walk =

The Women's 20,000m Walk event at the 2010 South American Games was held on March 20 at 8:00.

== Medalists ==
Gold	Silver	Bronze
Ingrid Hernández; Colombia	Arabelly Orjuela; Colombia	Paola Pérez; Ecuador

== Records ==
Standing records prior to the 2010 South American Games
World record	Olimpiada Ivanova	Russia	1:26:52.3	Brisbane, Australia	6 September 2001
South American record	Johana Ordóñez	Ecuador	1:34:57.9	Lima, Peru	20 June 2009

== Results ==
Results were published.

Rank	Athlete	Nationality	Result	Warnings	Notes
1st place, gold medalist(s)	Ingrid Hernández	Colombia	1:42:55.9		
2nd place, silver medalist(s)	Arabelly Orjuela	Colombia	1:45:29.4		
3rd place, bronze medalist(s)	Paola Pérez	Ecuador	1:47:09.8	>~	
4	Aline Sausen	Brazil	2:02:32.5		
–	Liliane Barbosa	Brazil	DSQ	>>>	
–	Claudia Cornejo	Bolivia	DSQ	>>>	

Intermediate times:

2000m	9:50.5	Ingrid Hernández (COL)
4000m	19:34.2	Ingrid Hernández (COL)
6000m	29:21.8	Ingrid Hernández (COL)
8000m	39:15.3	Ingrid Hernández (COL)
10000m	49:15.1	Ingrid Hernández (COL)
12000m	59:33.7	Ingrid Hernández (COL)
14000m	1:10:02.4	Ingrid Hernández (COL)
16000m	1:20:54.8	Ingrid Hernández (COL)
18000m	1:31:53.8	Ingrid Hernández (COL)

== See also ==
- 2010 South American Under-23 Championships in Athletics
