= Yerko Araya =

Chilean racewalker (born 1986)

Personal information
- Full name: Yerko Ignacio Araya Cortés
- Born: February 14, 1986 (age 40) Antofagasta, Antofagasta, Chile
- Height: 1.77 m (5 ft 10 in)
- Weight: 65 kg (143 lb)

Sport
- Country: Chile
- Sport: Athletics
- Event: Race walking
Medal record
Men's Racewalking
Representing Chile
South American Championships
Silver medal – second place	2009 Lima	20,000 m
Bronze medal – third place	2011 Buenos Aires	20,000 m
- Updated on 17 May 2015

Yerko Ignacio Araya Cortés (born 14 February 1986 in Antofagasta) is a Chilean racewalker. He competed in the 20 km walk at the 2012 Summer Olympics, where he placed 41st.

He has a twin brother, Edward, who is also a racewalker.

== Personal bests ==
=== Track walk ===
- 10,000 m: 40:48.94 min – (Australia) Canberra, 14 Enero 2018
- 20,000 m: 1:20:47.2 hrs (ht) – (Argentina) Buenos Aires, 5 June 2011

=== Road walk ===
- 10 km: 43:41 min – (Chile) Los Ángeles, 3 April 2004
- 20 km: 1:21:26 hrs – (Australia) Canberra, 21 February 2016

== Competition record ==
Year	Competition	Venue	Position	Event	Notes
Representing Chile
2002	South American Race Walking Championships (U18)	Puerto Saavedra, Chile	6th	10 km	49:44
2002	South American Race Walking Championships (U18)	Puerto Saavedra, Chile	1st	Team (10 km Youth)	15 pts
2003	South American Junior Championships	Guayaquil, Ecuador	6th	10,000 m walk	48:23.6
2003	World Youth Championships	Sherbrooke, Canada	9th	10,000 m walk	45:38.88
2004	South American Race Walking Championships (U20)	Los Ángeles, Chile	3rd	10 km	43:41
2004	South American Race Walking Championships (U20)	Los Ángeles, Chile	1st	Team (10 km Junior)	12 pts
2004	World Junior Championships	Grosseto, Italy	28th	10,000 m walk	48:20.94
2005	Pan American Race Walking Cup - Junior	Lima, Peru	—	10 km	DQ
2005	South American Junior Championships	Rosario, Argentina	8th	10,000 m walk	44:38
2006	South American Race Walking Championships	Cochabamba, Bolivia	—	20 km	DQ/DNF
2006	South American U23 Championships / South American Games	Buenos Aires, Argentina	3rd	20,000 m walk	1:31:31.0
2008	South American Race Walking Championships	Cuenca, Ecuador	10th	20 km	1:32:34
2008	South American Race Walking Championships	Cuenca, Ecuador	3rd	Team (20 km)	37 pts
2008	Ibero-American Championships	Iquique, Chile	8th	20,000 m walk	1:27:44.89
2008	South American U23 Championships	Lima, Peru	5th	20,000 m walk	1:31:26
2009	Pan American Race Walking Cup	San Salvador, El Salvador	7th	20 km	1:27:10
2009	South American Championships	Lima, Peru	2nd	20,000 m walk	1:23:08.2
2009	World Championships	Berlin, Germany	29th	20 km	1:24:49
2010	South American Race Walking Championships	Cochabamba, Bolivia	3rd	20 km	1:30:45
2010	World Race Walking Cup	Chihuahua, Mexico	10th	20 km	1:24:23
2010	Ibero-American Championships	San Fernando, Spain	2nd	20,000 m walk	1:25:27.5
2011	Pan American Race Walking Cup	Envigado, Colombia	17th	20 km	1:35:40
2011	South American Championships	Buenos Aires, Argentina	3rd	20,000 m walk	1:20:47.2
2011	World Championships	Daegu, South Korea	33rd	20 km	1:27:47
2011	Pan American Games	Guadalajara, Mexico	–	20 km	DQ
2012	World Race Walking Cup	Saransk, Russia	79th	20 km	1:30:24
2012	Olympic Games	London, United Kingdom	41st	20 km	1:25:27
2013	Pan American Race Walking Cup	Guatemala City, Guatemala	12th	20 km	1:29:43
2013	World Championships	Moscow, Russia	22nd	20 km	1:24:42
2014	South American Games	Santiago, Chile	5th	20,000 m walk	1:24:13.8
2014	World Race Walking Cup	Taicang, China	—	20 km	DQ
2015	Pan American Race Walking Cup	Arica, Chile	16th	20 km	1:26:31
2015	Pan American Race Walking Cup	Arica, Chile	8th	Team (20 km)	85 pts
2015	South American Championships	Lima, Peru	—	20,000 m walk	DQ
2015	World Championships	Beijing, China	49th	20 km walk	1:29:12
2018	South American Games	Cochabamba, Bolivia	3rd	20,000 m walk	1:29:37
2018	Ibero-American Championships	Trujillo, Peru	4th	20,000 m walk	1:25:07.20
2019	South American Championships	Lima, Peru	–	20,000 m walk	DNF
