= Mónica Equihua =

Mexican race walker (born 1982)

Personal information
- Full name: Mónica Equihua Solórzano
- Born: 23 September 1982 (age 43) Tancítaro, Michoacán, Mexico
- Height: 1.67 m (5 ft 6 in)
- Weight: 53 kg (117 lb)

Sport
- Country: Mexico
- Sport: Athletics
- Event: Race walking
- Updated on 6 January 2015

Mónica Equihua Solórzano (born 23 September 1982) is a Mexican race walker. At the age of 26 years, she switched from middle-distance running to race walking. She competed in the 20 km kilometres event at the 2012 Summer Olympics.

== Personal bests ==
Event	Result	Venue	Date
800 m	2:10.62 min	Monterrey, Mexico	22 June 2008
Road walk
10 km	46:03 min	London, United Kingdom	11 August 2012
20 km	1:31:09 hrs	Rio Maior, Portugal	6 April 2013
Track walk
10,000 m	49:15.72 min	Xalapa, Mexico	8 May 2010
20,000 m	1:36:05.0 hrs (ht)	Xalapa, Mexico	31 August 2014

== Achievements ==
Year	Competition	Venue	Position	Event	Notes
Representing Mexico
2009	IAAF Race Walking Challenge	Chihuahua, Mexico	21st	20 km walk	1:48:41
2010	World Race Walking Cup	Chihuahua, Mexico	49th	20 km walk	1:50:45
2011	IAAF Race Walking Challenge	Chihuahua, Mexico	9th	20 km walk	1:39:52
2011	Pan American Race Walking Cup	Envigado, Colombia	7th	20 km walk	1:38:44
2011	Pan American Race Walking Cup	Envigado, Colombia	2nd	Team (20 km)	24 pts
2011	Pan American Games	Guadalajara, Mexico	4th	20 km walk	1:34:50 A
2012	IAAF Race Walking Challenge	Chihuahua, Mexico	3rd	20 km walk	1:36:25
2012	World Race Walking Cup	Saransk, Russia	59th	20 km walk	1:41:34
2012	Olympic Games	London, United Kingdom	30th	20 km walk	1:32:28
2013	IAAF Race Walking Challenge	Chihuahua, Mexico	3rd	20 km walk	1:35:29
2013	Pan American Race Walking Cup	Guatemala City, Guatemala	5th	20 km walk	1:35:43 A
2013	Pan American Race Walking Cup	Guatemala City, Guatemala	1st	Team (20 km)	16 pts
2013	World Championships	Moscow, Russia	51st	20 km walk	1:36:46
2014	Central American and Caribbean Games	Xalapa, Mexico	4th	20 km walk	1:38:07 A
