= Lupita González =

Mexican racewalker (born 1989)

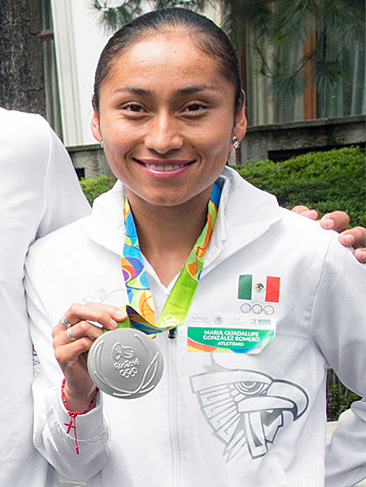

Personal information
- Full name: María Guadalupe González Romero
- Nickname: Lupita
- Born: 9 January 1989 (age 37) Tlalnepantla de Baz, Mexico
- Employer: Mexican Army
- Height: 162 cm (5 ft 4 in)
- Weight: 47 kg (104 lb)

Sport
- Sport: athletics Race walking
Medal record
Representing Mexico
Women's athletics
Olympic Games
Silver medal – second place	2016 Rio de Janeiro	20 km walk
World Championships
Silver medal – second place	2017 London	20 km walk
World Team Championships
Gold medal – first place	2016 Rome	20 km walk
Gold medal – first place	2018 Taicang	20 km walk
Pan American Games
Gold medal – first place	2015 Toronto	20 km walk

María Guadalupe González Romero (born 9 January 1989), better known as Lupita González, is a Mexican race walker. She was the silver medalist in the 20km walk at the Rio 2016 Olympic Games. She was also the gold medalist at the 2015 Pan American Games and is the Mexican national record holder in the 20 kilometres race walk.

González is currently serving a competition ban due to a second anti-doping violation. The ban is due to expire in November 2026.

== Career ==
=== Performances ===
Raised in the State of Mexico, she first emerged as an elite level walker in the 2013 season. The 2013 Central American and Caribbean Championships in Athletics saw her claim the 10,000 metres race walk gold medal for the host nation. She soon established herself as the nation's best walker, with a new Mexican national record of 1:28:48 at the 2014 IAAF World Race Walking Cup, where she placed 16th overall in the 20 kilometres race walk event. She also broke the 15 km walk record en route to that distance.

On her debut appearance at the 2015 Pan American Race Walking Cup she was a clear winner in the 20 km walk, crossing the line in a championship record time of 1:29:21 hours – nearly two minutes ahead of runner-up Kimberly García. González's performance led Mexico to the women's team title, alongside her compatriots Alejandra Ortega and Lizbeth Silva. She was among the leading entrants at the Pan American Games two months later and came away with the gold medal, restoring Mexico's initial success in the event which had ended after Victoria Palacios's win in 2003. Hot and humid weather conditions during the race in Toronto affected González, who despite having a winning margin of over half a minute and breaking the games record collapsed after finishing the distance.

María Guadalupe then won the Race Walking World Cup in Rome and was regarded as one of the favorites to win the Olympic Games, and won silver, becoming the first female Mexican race walker to step on the Olympic podium.

That same year she also went on to win the 2016 IAAF Race Walking Challenge series.

=== Anti-doping violations ===
González has received two competition bans for anti-doping violations during her career. Her first ban of four years that lasted from November 2018 to November 2022 was issued after testing positive for the use of trenbolone. An appeal has dismissed in 2020. As a consequence of that ban, González received a second anti-doping violation ban of four years to run from November 2022 to November 2026 due to tampering with the first investigation that included submitted forged documents and false testimony. An appeal was dismissed in 2023.

== Personal bests ==
- 10,000 metres race walk – 47:48.30 (2013)
- 10 kilometres race walk – 43:49 (2015)
- 15 kilometres race walk – 1:06:55 (2014) NR
- 20 kilometres race walk – 1:28:37 (2016) NR

== International competitions ==
Year	Competition	Venue	Position	Event	Notes
2013	Central American and Caribbean Championships	Morelia, Mexico	1st	10,000 m walk	47:48.30
2014	World Race Walking Cup	Taicang, China	16th	20 km walk	1:28:48
2015	Pan American Race Walking Cup	Arica, Chile	1st	20 km walk	1:29:21 CR
2015	Pan American Games	Toronto, Canada	1st	20 km walk	1:29:24 GR
2016	Summer Olympics	Rio de Janeiro, Brazil	2nd	20 km walk	1:28:37 NR
