= Omar Segura =

Mexican racewalker

Personal information
- Nationality: Mexican
- Born: 24 April 1981 (age 45)

Sport
- Sport: Athletics
- Event: Racewalking

Omar Segura (born 24 April 1981) is a Mexican racewalker. He competed in the men's 20 kilometres walk at the 2004 Summer Olympics.
