= Stefany Coronado =

Bolivian race walker

Personal information
- Born: 16 September 1996 (age 29) La Paz, Bolivia

Sport
- Sport: Track and field
- Event: 20 kilometres race walk

Stefany Coronado (born 16 September 1996) is a Bolivian race walker. She competed in the women's 20 kilometres walk event at the 2016 Summer Olympics, where she finished in 43rd place with a time of 1:37:56.
