= Paola Pérez =

Ecuadorian race walker

Personal information
- Full name: Paola Bibiana Pérez Saquipay
- Born: 21 December 1989 (age 36) Cuenca, Azuay, Ecuador
- Height: 1.48 m (4 ft 10 in)
- Weight: 45 kg (99 lb)

Sport
- Country: Ecuador
- Sport: Athletics
Medal record
Representing Ecuador
Women's athletics
World Team Championships
| Gold medal – first place | 2022 Muscat | 35 km walk (team) |
| Silver medal – second place | 2018 Taicang | 50 km walk (team) |
Pan American Games
| Bronze medal – third place | 2015 Toronto | 20 km walk |
| Bronze medal – third place | 2019 Lima | 50 km walk |
South American Games
| Bronze medal – third place | 2010 Medellín | 20,000 m walk |
South American Championships
| Gold medal – first place | 2017 Asunción | 20,000 m walk |
- Updated on 22 July 2015

Paola Bibiana Pérez Saquipay (born 21 December 1989) is an Ecuadorian race walker. She competed in the 20 km kilometres event at the 2012 and 2016 Summer Olympics.

She represented Ecuador at the 2020 Summer Olympics.

== Personal bests ==
=== Track walk ===
- 10,000 m: 44:51.97 min – Guayaquil, Ecuador, 18 April 2021
- 20,000 m: 1:32:26.0 hrs – Asunción, Paraguay, 24 June 2017

=== Road walk ===
- 20 km walk: 1:29:06 hrs – Sucúa, Ecuador, 15 April 2017

== Achievements ==
| Year | Competition | Venue | Position | Event | Notes |
Representing Ecuador
| 2006 | South American Race Walking Championships (U18) | Cochabamba, Bolivia | 6th | 5 km | 28:23 |
| 2008 | South American Race Walking Championships (U20) | Cuenca, Ecuador | – | 10 km | DQ |
| 2008 | South American Race Walking Championships (U20) | Cuenca, Ecuador | 2nd | Team (10 km Junior) | 10 pts |
| 2010 | South American Race Walking Championships | Cochabamba, Bolivia | 8th | 20 km | 1:50:14 A |
| 2010 | South American Race Walking Championships | Cochabamba, Bolivia | 2nd | Team (20 km) | 19 pts |
| 2010 | South American Under-23 Championships South American Games | Medellín, Colombia | 3rd | 20,000m walk | 1:47:09.8 A |
| 2010 | World Race Walking Cup | Chihuahua, Mexico | – | 20 km | DNF |
| 2010 | World Race Walking Cup | Chihuahua, Mexico | 7th | Team (20 km) | 106 pts |
| 2011 | Pan American Race Walking Cup | Envigado, Colombia | 9th | 20 km | 1:39:35 |
| 2011 | Pan American Race Walking Cup | Envigado, Colombia | 3rd | Team (20 km) | 36 pts |
| 2011 | South American Championships | Buenos Aires, Argentina | – | 20,000m walk | DQ |
| 2011 | ALBA Games | Barquisimeto, Venezuela | 3rd | 20,000m walk | 1:41:26.4 |
| 2011 | Pan American Games | Guadalajara, Mexico | – | 20 km | DQ |
| 2012 | World Race Walking Cup | Saransk, Russia | 48th | 20 km | 1:39:11 |
| 2012 | World Race Walking Cup | Saransk, Russia | 12th | Team (20 km) | 158 pts |
| 2012 | Olympic Games | London, United Kingdom | 51st | 20 km | 1:37:05 |
| 2013 | Pan American Race Walking Cup | Guatemala City, Guatemala | 13th | 20 km | 1:40:08 A |
| 2013 | Pan American Race Walking Cup | Guatemala City, Guatemala | 3rd | Team (20 km) | 42 pts |
| 2013 | Universiade | Kazan, Russia | 7th | 20 km | 1:33:40 |
| 2013 | World Championships | Moscow, Russia | 27th | 20 km | 1:33:03 |
| 2013 | Bolivarian Games | Trujillo, Peru | 6th | 20 km | 1:36:51 |
| 2014 | South American Games | Santiago, Chile | 4th | 20,000 m | 1:41:01.4 |
| 2014 | World Race Walking Cup | Taicang, China | 60th | 20 km | 1:36:19 |
| 2014 | World Race Walking Cup | Taicang, China | 13th | Team (20 km) | 186 pts |
| 2015 | Pan American Race Walking Cup | Arica, Chile | 13th | 20 km | 1:39:40 |
| 2015 | Pan American Race Walking Cup | Arica, Chile | 5th | Team (20 km) | 51 pts |
| 2015 | World Championships | Beijing, China | 16th | 20 km walk | 1:32:12 |
| 2017 | South American Championships | Asunción, Paraguay | 1st | 20,000 m walk | 1:32:26.0 |
| 2017 | Bolivarian Games | Santa Marta, Colombia | 4th | 20 km walk | 1:35:30 |
| 2018 | South American Games | Cochabamba, Bolivia | 4th | 20,000 m walk | 1:38:08 |
