= Stephanie Casey =

American race walker

Personal information
- Full name: Stephanie Casey
- Nationality: American
- Born: August 1, 1983 (age 42) Reedsport, Oregon, U.S.
- Home town: Salem, Oregon, U.S.
- Education: Oregon State Beavers '05; Des Moines University '12
- Height: 5 ft 6 in (1.68 m)
- Weight: 135 lb (61 kg)

Sport
- Country: USA
- Sport: Track and field Athletics
- Event: Racewalking
- Turned pro: 2005

Achievements and titles
- Personal best(s): 35 km walk: 3:00:05; 20 km walk: 1:37:11; 10 km walk: 49:29.78 50 km walk: 4:41:12
Medal record
Women's Athletics/
track and field
Representing the United States
NACAC Championships

Stephanie Casey (born August 1, 1983) is an American race walker and Family Medicine Doctor. Casey represented Team USA at World Athletics Championships, Pan American Games, World Athletics Race Walking Team Championships and North American, Central American and Caribbean Championships in athletics (race walk).

== Life and career ==
Dr Stephanie Casey is a mother of 4 and wife.

== Competition record ==
Year	Competition	Venue	Position	Event	Notes
Representing the United States
2023	World Championships	Budapest, Hungary	37th	35 km	DNF
2023	Pan American Games	Santiago, Chile	14th	20 km	NT
2022	World Championships	Eugene, United States	24th	35 km	3:00:54 PB
2022	NACAC Championships	Freeport, Bahamas	4th	20 km	1:44:07
2019	2019 Pan American Games	Lima, Peru	9th	50 km	4:50:31
2019	Pan American Race Walking Cup	Lázaro Cárdenas, Michoacán, Mexico	6th	50 km	4:41:12
2010	IAAF Race Walking Team Championships	Chihuahua City, Mexico	DNF	20 km	DNF
2008	IAAF Race Walking Team Championships	Cheboksary, Russia	75th	20 km	1:49:42
