= Maria Michta-Coffey =

American race walker

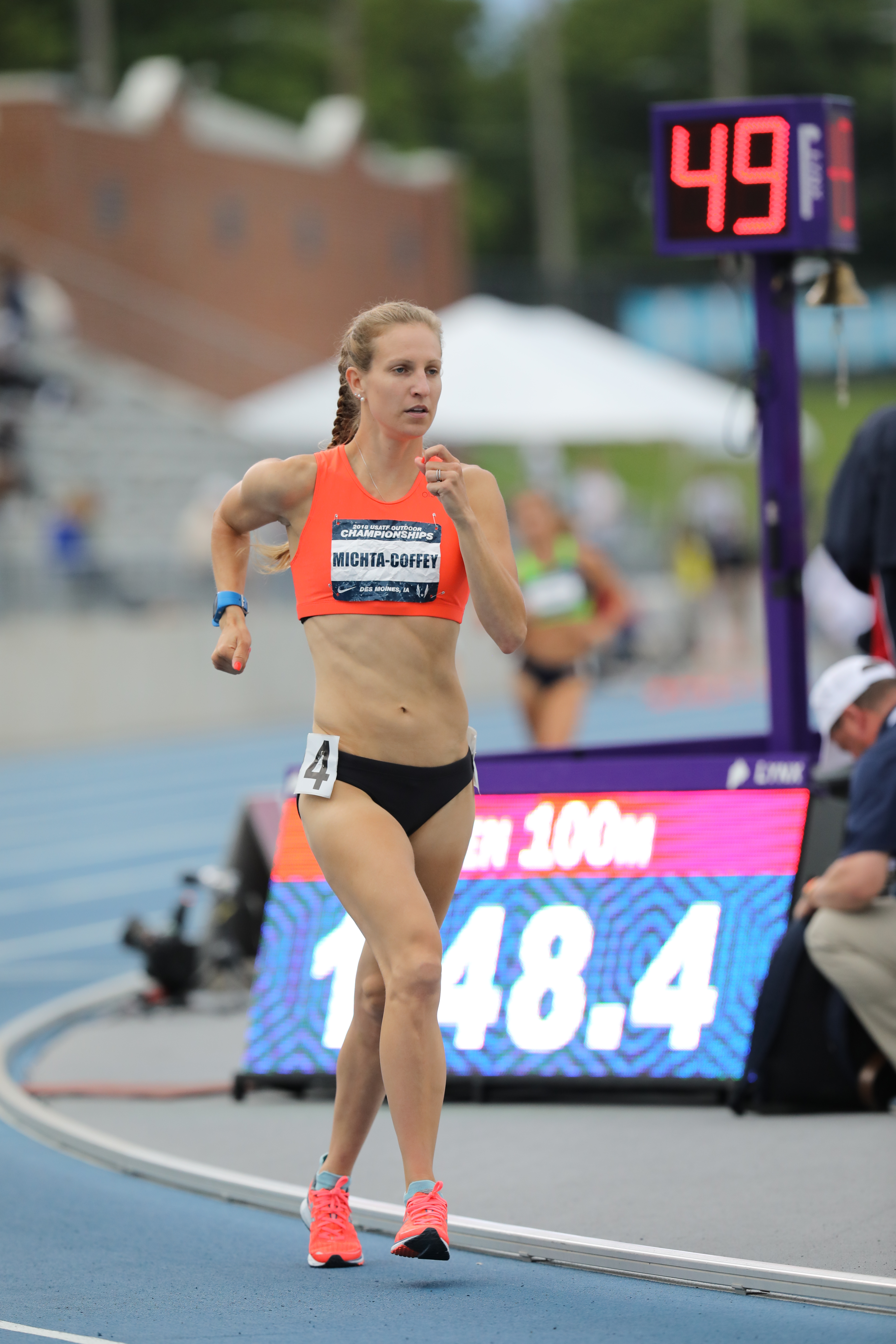
- Michta-Coffey at the 2018 USA Outdoor Track and Field Championships

Personal information
- Full name: Maria Lynn Michta-Coffey
- Nationality: American
- Born: June 23, 1986 (age 40) Stony Brook, New York, U.S.
- Height: 5 ft 5 in (165 cm)
- Weight: 115 lb (52 kg)

Sport
- Country: United States
- Sport: Track and field
- Event: Racewalking
- Club: Walk USA
- Coached by: Tim Seaman

Achievements and titles
- Personal bests: 20 km walk: 1:30:49 American Record 15km walk: 1:07:51 American Record 10km walk: 44:09 official split in 20k 5km walk: 21:51 American Record
Medal record
Women's Athletics/ track and field
Representing the United States
NACAC Championships
Gold medal – first place	2018 Toronto	20,000 m
Bronze medal – third place	2022 Freeport	20 km

Maria Lynn Michta-Coffey (born June 23, 1986) is an American race walker. She is a two-time Olympian, having competed for the US at both the 2012 and 2016 Summer Olympics in the 20-kilometer event. Michta-Coffey is the American record-holder at three racewalking distances: 5, 15, and 20 km.

== Life and career ==
Michta-Coffey had a strong 2014 season, setting four American records in the race walk, and broke her own American record in the 20 km twice in just over one month. She was the highest placed American finisher ever in the women's 20 km IAAF World Race Walking Cup, setting a new American record of 1:30:49 and finishing 30th. Michta won her 6th national title of 2014 on September 14 at the National 30k in Valley Cottage, NY.

Michta-Coffey competed at the 2012 Summer Olympics in London in the 20 kilometer race walk after winning the U.S. Olympic trials with a time of 1:34:53.33. At the 2012 Olympics, she finished in 29th place in the 20 kilometer race walk with a time of 1:32:27, a new personal best.

She won her 30th national title on June 30, 2016 at the US Olympic Trials, earning her second Olympic berth. She finished in 22nd place at the Rio Olympics.

== Personal life ==
Michta-Coffey is of Polish descent.

Michta graduated from high school in the Sachem School District on Long Island in New York in 2004. She graduated as valedictorian from Long Island University C. W. Post Campus in 2008 and then became a PhD candidate at the Mount Sinai Medical School in biomedical science. She defended her Ph.D. in 2014 with her thesis, "Hepatitis C virus cell entry determinants of occludin". While training for the 2016 Summer Olympics, Michta-Coffey taught at Suffolk County Community College as an adjunct professor. Currently, Michta-Coffey works as a Rapid Response and Procedural Physician Assistant.

Michta-Coffey married her Sachem High School sweetheart Joe Coffey on July 3, 2014. After her marriage, she began racing under the name Michta-Coffey.

She was inducted into the Suffolk Sports Hall of Fame on Long Island in the Track & Field Category with the Class of 2016.

Michta-Coffey is the mother of children, Liliana Marie and Daniel Chester.

== Personal bests ==
Event	Result	Venue	Date
Road walk
5 km	21:51 min	Albany, United States	31 May 2015 American Record
10 km	44:09+ min	Earth City, United States	3 April 2016 American Record
15 km	1:07:51+ hrs	Taicang, China	3 May 2014 American Record
20 km	1:30:49 hrs	Taicang, China	3 May 2014 American Record
Track walk
5000 m	21:48.09 min	Philadelphia, United States	28 April 2018
10,000 m	45:31.40 min	Manalapan, United States	30 July 2017

== Competition record ==
Year	Competition	Venue	Position	Event	Notes
Representing the United States
2003	World Youth Championships	Sherbrooke, Quebec, Canada	10th	5000 m track walk	24:52.06
2004	World Race Walking Cup (U20)	Naumburg, Germany	29th	10 km	53:04
2004	World Race Walking Cup (U20)	Naumburg, Germany	14th	Junior team	68 pts
2004	World Junior Championships	Grosseto, Italy	22nd	10,000 m	51:42.95
2005	Pan American Race Walking Cup (U20)	Lima, Peru	2nd	10 km	48:03
2005	Pan American Race Walking Cup (U20)	Lima, Peru	4th	Junior team	19 pts
2005	Pan American Junior Championships	Windsor, Ontario, Canada	3rd	10,000 m	49:43.85
2006	NACAC U-23 Championships	Santo Domingo, Dominican Republic	5th	10,000 m walk	52:26.00
2007	Pan American Race Walking Cup	Balneário Camboriú, Brazil	19th	20 km	1:53:55
2007	Pan American Race Walking Cup	Balneário Camboriú, Brazil	4th	Team	45 pts
2007	NACAC Championships	San Salvador, El Salvador	7th	10,000 m	59:00.37
2008	World Race Walking Cup	Cheboksary, Russia	66th	20 km	1:45:02
2008	World Race Walking Cup	Cheboksary, Russia	15th	Team	190 pts
2009	Pan American Race Walking Cup	San Salvador, El Salvador	13th	20 km	1:50:21
2009	Pan American Race Walking Cup	San Salvador, El Salvador	3rd	Team	39 pts
2011	World Championships	Daegu, South Korea	29th	20 km	1:38:54
2011	Pan American Games	Guadalajara, Mexico	9th	20 km	1:38:47 A
2012	Olympic Games	London, United Kingdom	29th	20 km	1:32:27
2013	World Championships	Moscow, Russia	33rd	20 km	1:33:51
2014	World Race Walking Cup	Taicang, China	30th	20 km	1:30:49
2014	World Race Walking Cup	Taicang, China	12th	Team	167 pts
2015	Pan American Race Walking Cup	Arica, Chile	5th	20 km	1:34:06
2015	Pan American Race Walking Cup	Arica, Chile	3rd	Team	35 pts
2015	World Championships	Beijing, China	20th	20 km	1:33:24
2016	Olympic Games	Rio de Janeiro, Brazil	22nd	20 km	1:33:41
2018	NACAC Championships	Toronto, Canada	1st	20,000 m	1:36:34 CR
2019	2019 World Athletics Championships	Doha, Qatar	35th	20 km	1:46:02
2022	World Championships	Eugene, United States	22nd	35 km	2:58:51 PB
2022	NACAC Championships	Freeport, Bahamas	3rd	20 km	1:42:14.32
