= Mario Alfonso Bran =

Guatemalan race walker

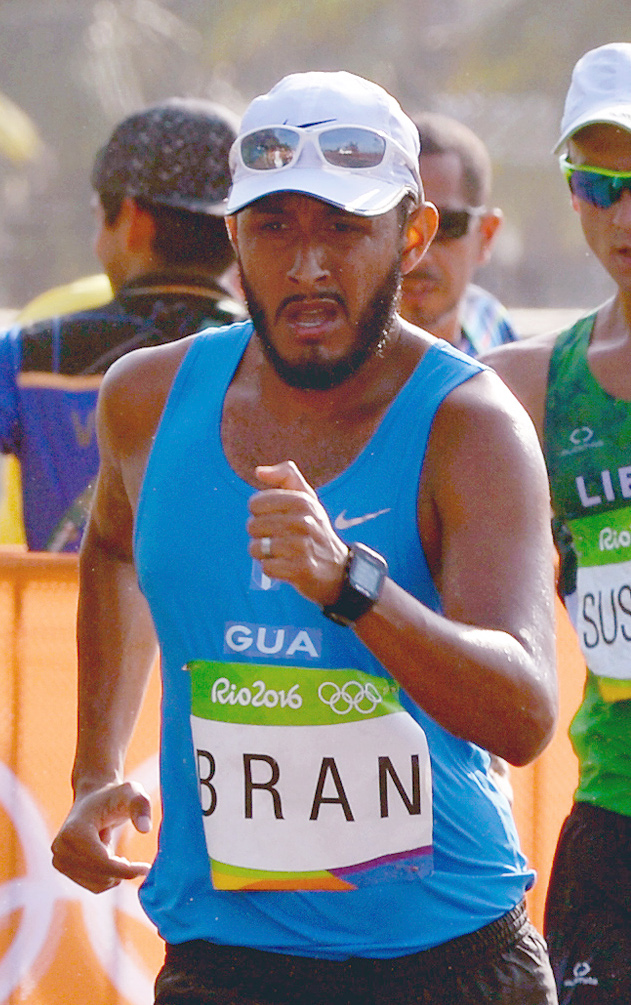
- Bran at the 2016 Olympics

Personal information
- Born: 17 October 1989 (age 36)
- Height: 168 cm (5 ft 6 in)
- Weight: 64 kg (141 lb)

Sport
- Sport: Athletics
- Event: Race walking

Achievements and titles
- Personal best: 50 km – 4:03:59 (2013)

Mario Alfonso Bran (born 17 October 1989) is a Guatemalan race walker. He competed in the 50 km event at the 2016 Summer Olympics and finished 42nd. Bran placed second over 20 km at the Central American Race Walking Championships in 2012–14.
