= Cristina López (race walker) =

Salvadoran race walker

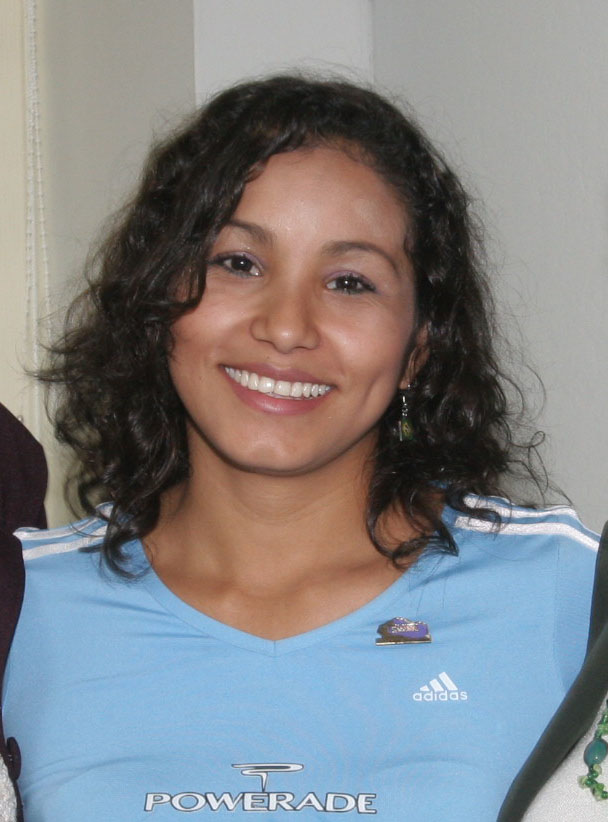

Personal information
- Full name: Cristina Esmeralda López
- Born: 19 September 1982 (age 43) Ozatlán, Usulután, El Salvador
- Height: 1.68 m (5 ft 6 in)
- Weight: 51 kg (112 lb)

Sport
- Country: El Salvador
- Sport: Women's Athletics
- Event: Race walking
Medal record
Women's Athletics
Representing El Salvador
Pan American Games
Gold medal – first place	2007 Rio de Janeiro	20 km
NACAC Championships
Gold medal – first place	2007 San Salvador	10 km
Central American and Caribbean Games
Gold medal – first place	2006 Cartagena	20 km
Central American and Caribbean Championships
Gold medal – first place	2005 Nassau	10 km
Bronze medal – third place	2009 Havana	10 km
Central American Games
Gold medal – first place	2013 San José	20 km
Bronze medal – third place	2001 Guatemala City	20 km
Central American Championships
Gold medal – first place	2009 Guatemala City	10 km
Gold medal – first place	2011 San José	10 km
- Updated on 6 January 2015

Cristina Esmeralda López (born 19 September 1982) is a Salvadoran race walker. She was born in Ozatlán.

She made history by winning the first ever gold medal for El Salvador at the Pan American Games. At the time, Lopez also had the worries of having her 3-year-old daughter Monica Michelle back in El Salvador undergoing treatment for cancer. Lopez crossed the finish line in 1:38:59, a full minute and 4 seconds ahead of the runner-up.

== Personal bests ==
=== Track walk ===
- 10,000 m: 44:16.21 min – San Salvador, El Salvador, 13 July 2007

=== Road walk ===
- 10 km: 49:02 min – San Salvador, El Salvador, 30 March 2014
- 20 km: 1:30:08 hrs – A Coruña, Spain, 4 June 2005

== Achievements ==
Year	Competition	Venue	Position	Event	Notes
Representing El Salvador
2000	World Junior Championships	Santiago, Chile	20th	10,000 m	53:12.90
2001	Central American Junior Championships	San Salvador, El Salvador	1st	5000 m track walk	23:19.27
2001	Pan American Junior Championships	Santa Fe, Argentina	1st	10,000 m track walk	51:41.9
2001	Central American Games	Guatemala City, Guatemala	3rd	20 km	1:49:01 A
2002	Ibero-American Championships	Guatemala City, Guatemala	6th	20 km walk	DNF
2005	Pan American Race Walking Cup	Lima, Peru	1st	20 km walk	1:30:35
2005	Central American and Caribbean Championships	Nassau, Bahamas	1st	10,000 m	45:52.32
2005	World Championships	Helsinki, Finland	—	20 km	DSQ
2006	World Race Walking Cup	A Coruña, Spain	31st	20 km road walk	1:35:36
2006	Central American and Caribbean Games	Cartagena, Colombia	1st	20 km walk	1:38:26
2007	Pan American Race Walking Cup	Balneário Camboriú, Brazil	1st	20 km walk	1:39:21
2007	NACAC Championships	San Salvador, El Salvador	1st	10,000 m	44:16.21
2007	Pan American Games	Rio de Janeiro, Brazil	1st	20 km	1:38:59
2009	Central American Championships	Guatemala City, Guatemala	1st	10 km	47:35.35 CR
2009	Central American and Caribbean Championships	Havana, Cuba	3rd	10 km	49:30
2009	Pan American Race Walking Cup	San Salvador, El Salvador	—	20 km road walk	DNF
2009	World Championships	Berlin, Germany	37th	20 km	1:47:33
2010	World Race Walking Cup	Chihuahua, Mexico	40th	20 km road walk	1:45:43
2011	Central American Race Walking Cup	San Salvador, El Salvador	3rd	20 km road walk	1:49:46
2011	Central American Championships	San José, Costa Rica	1st	10,000 m	49:48.36
2013	Central American Race Walking Cup	Guatemala City, Guatemala	1st	10 km road walk	55:48
2013	Central American Games	San José, Costa Rica	1st	20 km road walk	1:48:12
2013	Pan American Race Walking Cup	Guatemala City, Guatemala	12th	20 km road walk	1:42:33
2013	Central American Championships	Managua, Nicaragua	1st	10,000 m track walk	47:47.62
2013	Central American and Caribbean Championships	Morelia, Mexico	4th	10,000 m	52:23.40
2014	Central American Race Walking Championships	San Salvador, El Salvador	1st	10 km road walk	49:02
2014	Central American Championships	Tegucigalpa, Honduras	1st	10,000m track walk	49:18.36
2014	Ibero-American Championships	São Paulo, Brazil	9th	10,000m track walk	47:54.88
2014	Central American and Caribbean Games	Xalapa, Mexico	7th	20 km road walk	1:57:00 A
