= Cisiane Lopes =

Brazilian racewalker

Personal information
- Full name: Cisiane Dutra Lopes
- Born: February 17, 1983 (age 43) Jaboatão dos Guararapes, Pernambuco, Brazil
- Height: 1.59 m (5 ft 3 in)
- Weight: 49 kg (108 lb)

Sport
- Country: Brazil
- Sport: Athletics
- Event: Racewalking
Medal record
Women's Athletics
Representing Brazil
Ibero-American Championships
Bronze medal – third place	2008 Iquique	10,000 metres walk
South American Under-23 Championships
Gold medal – first place	2004 Barquisimeto	10,000 metres walk
- Updated on 27 July 2013

Cisiane Dutra Lopes (born 17 February 1983 in Jaboatão dos Guararapes, Pernambuco) is a female racewalker from Brazil. She competed in the 2007, 2011 and 2015 Pan American Games in Brazil, the Pan American Race Walking Cup, the 2008 World Cup of Athletics and in the 2015 World Championships. She also competed in the 2016 Olympic Games coming in at 49th. She was the bronze medalist at the 2008 Ibero-American Championships in Athletics. She was the 2004 South American Under-23 Championships in Athletics Champion.

She is a five time Brazilian National Champion, 2003, twice in 2006, 2007 and 2008.
