= María Guadalupe Sánchez (race walker, born 1995) =

Mexican racewalker

María Guadalupe Sánchez (born August 4, 1995) is a Mexican racewalker. She placed 23rd in the women's 20 kilometres walk at the 2016 Summer Olympics.
