= Jamy Franco =

Guatemalan race walker (born 1991)

Personal information
- Full name: Jamy Amarilis Franco Núñez
- Born: 1 July 1991 (age 35) Santa Rosa de Lima, Santa Rosa, Guatemala
- Height: 1.7 m (5 ft 7 in) (2011)
- Weight: 49 kg (108 lb)

Sport
- Sport: Women's Athletics
- Event: Race walking
- Coached by: Rigoberto Medina
Medal record
Representing Guatemala
Women's race walking
Pan American Games
Gold medal – first place	2011 Guadalajara	20 km race walk
Central American Championships
Bronze medal – third place	2009 Guatemala City	10 km
Pan American Junior Championships
Gold medal – first place	2005 Windsor	10 km
CAC Junior Championships (U17)
Gold medal – first place	2006 Port of Spain	4 km Track walk
- Updated on 18 September 2012

Jamy Amarilis Franco Núñez (born 1 July 1991) is a Guatemalan race walker. Cuban coach Rigoberto Medina has worked with her since 2010.

== Biography ==
Born on 1 July 1991 in Santa Rosa de Lima, Franco is the daughter of former Olympic race walker Evelyn Núñez. In 2005 at the age of 14, Franco won the 10,000 meter race walk at the Pan American Junior Athletics Championships in Windsor, Canada, setting a new record in the event. The following year, aged 15, she won the 4,000 m race walk in the Central American and Caribbean Junior Championships, under-17 category, again setting a competition record.

She took the bronze medal in the 10,000 meter race walk at the 2009 Central American Championships.

In March 2011, Franco won the Pan American Race Walking Cup, her first major title, and in August 2011 at the World Championships she finished in 19th place in the 20 km event, being the top ranked woman from the Americas and setting high expectations for the Pan American Games competition later that year.

On 23 October 2011, she won the 20 km race walk at the Pan American Games in Guadalajara, Mexico, breaking the Pan American Games women's record in the process and finishing the event 59 seconds ahead of her compatriot Mirna Ortíz, who finished second. It was the first time in the games' history that Guatemala won gold and silver medals in the same athletic event. It was also Guatemala's first win in an athletics event at the Games since Mateo Flores won the Marathon in the 1955 edition.

At the 2012 Memorial Mario Albisetti, Franco set a 20 km walk best of 1:30:57 hours, taking fourth place overall.

== Achievements ==
Year	Competition	Venue	Position	Event	Notes
Representing Guatemala
2005	Pan American Junior Championships	Windsor, Canada	1st	10 km	49:36.25 CR
2006	Central American and Caribbean Junior Championships (U-17)	Port of Spain, Trinidad and Tobago	1st	4 km	20:24.68 CR
2009	Central American Championships	Guatemala City, Guatemala	3rd	10 km	49:53.75
2009	Central American and Caribbean Championships	Havana, Cuba	5th	10 km	51:19
2011	World Championships	Daegu, South Korea	19th	20 km	1:34:36
2011	Pan American Games	Guadalajara, Mexico	1st	20 km	1:32:38 GR
2012	Olympic Games	London, United Kingdom	31st	20 km	1:33:18
