= Evelyn Núñez =

Guatemalan race walker

Personal information
- Full name: Evelyn Rosmeri Núñez Fuentes
- Nationality: Guatemala
- Born: 9 April 1971 (age 55) Guatemala City, Guatemala
- Height: 1.61 m (5 ft 3 1/2 in)
- Weight: 56 kg (123 lb)

Sport
- Sport: Athletics
- Event: Race walking

Achievements and titles
- Personal bests: 10 km walk: 46:19.48 (2006); 20 km walk: 1:35:13 (2005)
Medal record
Women's athletics
Representing Guatemala
Ibero-American Championships
Silver medal – second place	2006 Ponce	10 km walk

Evelyn Rosmeri Núñez Fuentes (born 9 April 1971 in Guatemala City) is a female Guatemalan race walker. In 2006, she set a personal best time of 46:19.48 by winning the silver medal at the Ibero-American Championships in Ponce, Puerto Rico. She is also the mother of Jamy Franco, who ended the nation's 56-year drought by taking the race walk title at the 2011 Pan American Games in Guadalajara, Mexico.

At age thirty-seven, Núñez made her official debut for the 2008 Summer Olympics in Beijing, where she competed in the women's 20 km race walk. She finished and completed the race in forty-third place by three minutes behind Latvia's Jolanta Dukure, with the slowest time of 1:44:13.
