= Verónica Colindres =

Salvadoran racewalker

Personal information
- Full name: Verónica Abigail Colindres García
- Nationality: El Salvador
- Born: 9 July 1986 (age 40) San Juan Opico, La Libertad, El Salvador
- Height: 1.65 m (5 ft 5 in)
- Weight: 50 kg (110 lb)

Sport
- Sport: Athletics
- Event: Race walking

Achievements and titles
- Personal best: 20 km walk: 1:35:39 (2007)

Verónica Abigail Colindres García (born July 9, 1986, in Opico, La Libertad) is a female Salvadoran race walker. She won a silver medal for the 20 km at the 2009 Pan American Race Walking Cup in San Salvador, with a time of 1:39:45.

Colindres represented El Salvador at the 2008 Summer Olympics in Beijing, where she competed in the women's 20 km race walk. She completed the race in thirty-eighth place, six seconds behind Brazil's Tânia Spindler, with a seasonal best time of 1:36:52. Colindres was elevated to a higher position, when Greek race walker and former Olympic champion Athanasía Tsoumeléka was disqualified from the competition, after testing positive for CERA, an advanced version of the blood-booster erythropoietin (EPO).
