= Athletics at the 2019 Pan American Games – Men's 20 kilometres walk =

Men's 20 kilometres walk at the 2019 Pan American Games
- Venue: Parque Kennedy
- Dates: August 4
- Competitors: 16 from 11 nations
- Winning time: 1:21:51

Medalists
Gold medal	Brian Pintado	Ecuador
Silver medal	Caio Bonfim	Brazil
Bronze medal	José Alejandro Barrondo	Guatemala

The men's 20 kilometres walk competition of the athletics events at the 2019 Pan American Games took place on 4 August on a temporary circuit around the Parque Kennedy in Lima, Peru. The defending Pan American Games champion was Evan Dunfee of Canada.

== Records ==
World record	Yusuke Suzuki (JPN)	1:16:36	Nomi, Japan	March 15, 2015
Pan American Games record	Bernardo Segura (MEX)	1:20:17	Winnipeg, Canada	July 26, 1999

== Schedule ==
Date	Time	Round
August 4, 2019	10:30	Final

== Abbreviations ==
- All times shown are in hours:minutes:seconds

KEY:	q	Fastest non-qualifiers	Q	Qualified	NR	National record	PB	Personal best	SB	Seasonal best	DQ	Disqualified

== Results ==
Rank	Athlete	Nation	Time	Notes
1st place, gold medalist(s)	Brian Pintado	Ecuador	1:21:51	
2nd place, silver medalist(s)	Caio Bonfim	Brazil	1:21:57	
3rd place, bronze medalist(s)	José Alejandro Barrondo	Guatemala	1:21:57	
4	Mauricio Arteaga	Ecuador	1:22:23	SB
5	Evan Dunfee	Canada	1:22:27	
6	Andrés Olivas	Mexico	1:22:36	PB
7	José Leonardo Montaña	Colombia	1:23:23	
8	Richard Vargas	Venezuela	1:25:08	
9	Yassir Cabrera	Panama	1:25:39	
10	Juan Manuel Cano	Argentina	1:26:42	
11	Yerko Araya	Chile	1:28:06	
12	Moacir Zimmermann	Brazil	1:33:14	
	Jose Mamani	Peru	DSQ	
	Carlos Sánchez Cantera	Mexico	DSQ	
	Éider Arévalo	Colombia	DNF	
	José María Raymundo	Guatemala	DNF	
