= 2013 Pan American Race Walking Cup =

- Organisers: Association of Panamerican Athletics
- Edition: 16th
- Date: 25–26 May
- Host city: Guatemala City, Guatemala
- Venue: Avenida Simeón Cañas, Zona 2
- Events: 5
- Participation: 144 athletes from 19 nations
- Official website: 2013 Pan American Race Walking Cup

The 2013 Pan American Race Walking Cup was held in Guatemala City, Guatemala. The track of the Cup runs in the Avenida Simeón Cañas, Zona 2.

A detailed report was given by Fernando Ruiz Del Valle.

Complete results were published.

== Medallists ==
Event	Gold		Silver		Bronze	
Men
10 km walk (junior event)	Manuel Esteban Soto (COL)	41:18	Erwin González (MEX)	41:26	Iván Garrido (COL)	41:32
20 km walk	Diego Flores (MEX)	1:24:16	José Leonardo Montaña (COL)	1:24:35	Caio Bonfim (BRA)	1:25:27
50 km walk	Omar Zepeda (MEX)	3:57:52	Horacio Nava (MEX)	3:58:00	Omar Segura (MEX)	4:03:11
Men (Team)
Team 10 km walk (junior event)	Colombia	7 pts	Ecuador	15 pts	Brazil	18 pts
Team 20 km walk	Brazil	38 pts	Guatemala	43 pts	Ecuador	52 pts
Team 50 km walk	(Mexico) México	12 pts	Colombia	24 pts		
Women
10 km walk (junior event)	Alejandra Ortega (MEX)	49:12	Jessica Hancco (PER)	51:30	Jessica Tapia (MEX)	51:31
20 km walk	Kimberly García (PER)	1:35:01	Sandra Arenas (COL)	1:35:14	Yanelli Caballero (MEX)	1:35:19
Women (Team)
Team 10 km walk (junior event)	(Mexico) México	4 pts	Colombia	15 pts	Venezuela	20 pts
Team 20 km walk	(Mexico) México	16 pts	Colombia	17 pts	Ecuador	42 pts

== Results ==
=== Men's 20 km ===
==== Individual ====
Place	Athlete	Time
1st place, gold medalist(s)	Diego Flores MEX	1:24:16
2nd place, silver medalist(s)	José Leonardo Montaña COL	1:24:35
3rd place, bronze medalist(s)	Caio Bonfim BRA	1:25:27
4	Evan Dunfee CAN	1:25:43
5	Mauricio Arteaga ECU	1:26:13
6	Isaac Palma MEX	1:26:55
7	Jaime Quiyuch GUA	1:27:49
8	Iñaki Gómez CAN	1:27:58
9	James Rendón COL	1:28:05
10	Ronald Quispe BOL	1:28:51
11	Rolando Saquipay ECU	1:29:30
12	Yerko Araya CHI	1:29:43
13	Pavel Chihuán PER	1:29:59
14	Aníbal Paau GUA	1:30:13
15	Patrick Stroupe USA	1:31:06
16	Mário dos Santos BRA	1:31:31
17	Allan Segura CRC	1:32:41
18	José Bustamante VEN	1:33:19
19	Daniel Alexandre Voigt BRA	1:33:27
20	José Rubio ECU	1:34:03
21	Luis López PUR	1:34:13
22	Ángel Batz GUA	1:34:36
23	Rubén Goliat CUB	1:36:01
24	John Nunn USA	1:36:33
25	Salvador Ernesto Mira ESA	1:37:39
26	Gabriel Calvo CRC	1:37:46
27	Mesías Zapata ECU	1:39:50
28	Michael Mannozzi USA	1:41:41
29	Yassir Cabrera PAN	1:43:21
30	Sergio Gutiérrez CRC	1:44:14
31	Wilman Vera VEN	1:45:17
—	Eder Sánchez MEX	DQ
—	Jhon Castañeda COL	DQ
—	Creighton Connolly CAN	DQ
—	Jesús Tadeo Vega MEX	DQ
—	Benjamin Thorne CAN	DNF
—	Yereman Salazar VEN	DNF
—	Luis Ángel Sánchez GUA	DNF
—	Dan Serianni USA	DNF
—	Isaias Fonseca HON	DNF

==== Team ====
Place	Country	Points
1st place, gold medalist(s)	Brazil	38 pts
2nd place, silver medalist(s)	Guatemala	43 pts
3rd place, bronze medalist(s)	Ecuador	52 pts
4	United States	67 pts
5	Costa Rica	73 pts

=== Men's 50 km ===
==== Individual ====
Place	Athlete	Time
1st place, gold medalist(s)	Omar Zepeda MEX	3:57:52
2nd place, silver medalist(s)	Horacio Nava MEX	3:58:00
3rd place, bronze medalist(s)	Omar Segura MEX	4:03:11
4	Mario Alfonso Bran GUA	4:03:59
5	Cristian Berdeja MEX	4:07:14
6	Omar Sierra COL	4:09:02
7	Luis Amauri Bustamante MEX	4:10:06
8	Jorge Armando Ruiz COL	4:10:56
9	Xavier Moreno ECU	4:11:09
10	Ferney Rojas COL	4:13:45
11	Clemente García MEX	4:17:38
12	Cláudio dos Santos BRA	4:28:41
13	Horacio Olivares MEX	4:30:48
14	Edgar Cudco ECU	4:36:37
15	Samir Cesar Sabadin BRA	5:02:43
—	Ray Sharp USA	DQ
—	Hugo Momotic GUA	DQ
—	Robinson Vivar ECU	DQ
—	Joel Vargas CUB	DNF
—	Jonnathan Cáceres ECU	DNF
—	Rodrigo Moreno COL	DNF

==== Team ====
Place	Country	Points
1st place, gold medalist(s)	(Mexico) México	12 pts
2nd place, silver medalist(s)	Colombia	24 pts

=== Men's 10 km (Junior) ===
==== Individual ====
Place	Athlete	Time
1st place, gold medalist(s)	Manuel Esteban Soto COL	41:18
2nd place, silver medalist(s)	Erwin González MEX	41:26
3rd place, bronze medalist(s)	Iván Garrido COL	41:32
4	Brian Pintado ECU	41:34
5	Richard Vargas VEN	41:40
6	Kenny Martín Pérez COL	41:44
7	Paolo Yurivilca PER	42:29
8	Bruno Marques Fidelis BRA	43:08
9	Marco Antonio Rodríguez BOL	43:39
10	Max Batista dos Santos BRA	44:59
11	Franco Chocho ECU	45:13
12	José Alejandro Barrondo GUA	45:38
13	Luis Alfonso López ESA	45:50
14	Jordy Jiménez ECU	46:12
15	Lucas Gomes Mazzo BRA	46:28
16	Jan Ramírez PUR	46:38
17	Elvin Coy GUA	46:43
18	Lismandy Martínez CUB	46:51
19	César Cristian Escobar ESA	47:57
20	Luis Miguel Colón PUR	48:26
21	Jefferson Chacón VEN	48:33
22	Anthony Peters USA	51:31
23	Steven Washburn USA	51:52
24	Alexander Peters USA	53:26
25	Jansel Marzan DOM	56:06
—	Jürgen Grave GUA	DQ
—	Jan Figueroa PUR	DNF

==== Team ====
Place	Country	Points
1st place, gold medalist(s)	Colombia	7 pts
2nd place, silver medalist(s)	Ecuador	15 pts
3rd place, bronze medalist(s)	Brazil	18 pts
4	Venezuela	26 pts
5	Guatemala	29 pts
6	El Salvador	32 pts
7	Puerto Rico	36 pts
8	United States	45 pts

=== Women's 20 km ===
==== Individual ====
Place	Athlete	Time
1st place, gold medalist(s)	Kimberly García PER	1:35:01
2nd place, silver medalist(s)	Sandra Arenas COL	1:35:14
3rd place, bronze medalist(s)	Yanelli Caballero MEX	1:35:19
4	Wendy Cornejo BOL	1:35:37
5	Mónica Equihua MEX	1:35:43
6	Sandra Galvis COL	01:35:45
7	Ángela Castro BOL	1:36:06
8	Lizbeth Silva MEX	1:37:17
9	Yeseida Carrillo COL	1:37:53
10	Rosalía Ortiz MEX	1:39:22
11	Paola Pérez ECU	1:40:08
12	Cristina López ESA	1:42:33
13	Maritza Guamán ECU	1:43:39
14	Katie Burnett USA	1:45:15
15	Nayibeth Rosales VEN	1:47:08
16	Susan Randall USA	1:48:42
17	Cisiane Lopes BRA	1:48:45
18	Sonnia Cartagena ECU	1:49:13
19	Elianay Pereira BRA	1:51:26
20	Andreina Gonzales DOM	1:53:19
21	Amanda Colón PUR	1:58:39
22	Cleia Silva BRA	2:00:24
23	Glenda Úbeda NIC	2:02:03
24	Denny Manzanillo DOM	2:10:28
25	Gissel Rodríguez PAN	2:10:45
26	Masiel Paulino DOM	2:17:41
—	Cristina Rodríguez DOM	DQ
—	Arabelly Orjuela COL	DQ
—	Erin Taylor-Talcott USA	DQ
—	Milanggela Rosales VEN	DNF
—	Yadira Guamán ECU	DNF
—	Milexsis Sepúlveda PUR	DNF

==== Team ====
Place	Country	Points
1st place, gold medalist(s)	(Mexico) México	16 pts
2nd place, silver medalist(s)	Colombia	17 pts
3rd place, bronze medalist(s)	Ecuador	42 pts
4	Brazil	58 pts
5	Dominican Republic	70 pts

=== Women's 10 km (Junior) ===
==== Individual ====
Place	Athlete	Time
1st place, gold medalist(s)	Alejandra Ortega MEX	49:12
2nd place, silver medalist(s)	Jessica Hancco PER	51:30
3rd place, bronze medalist(s)	Jessica Tapia MEX	51:31
4	Carolina Mariño COL	52:44
5	Mildred Raya MEX	53:37
6	Cheskaya Rosales VEN	54:54
7	Lilian Montero CUB	55:22
8	Rayane de Oliveira BRA	55:23
9	Brenda Jo McCollum USA	56:20
10	Karin Vicente GUA	56:28
11	Milena Restrepo COL	56:41
12	Brigitte González ECU	56:45
13	Maritza Poncio GUA	57:10
14	Natalia Alfonzo VEN	57:43
15	Brittany Collins USA	59:29
16	Sara Pulido COL	1:00:55
17	Linara da Cunha BRA	1:02:22
18	Gisele Teixeira BRA	1:08:22
19	Franchesca Durán DOM	1:09:59
—	Sonia Barrondo GUA	DQ
—	Estefany Valencia ECU	DQ

==== Team ====
Place	Country	Points
1st place, gold medalist(s)	(Mexico) México	4 pts
2nd place, silver medalist(s)	Colombia	15 pts
3rd place, bronze medalist(s)	Venezuela	20 pts
4	Guatemala	23 pts
5	United States	24 pts
6	Brazil	25 pts

== Participation ==
The participation of 144 athletes from 19 countries is reported.

- Bolivia (4)
- Brazil (14)
- Canada (4)
- Chile (1)
- Colombia (17)
- Costa Rica (3)
- Cuba (4)
- Dominican Republic (6)
- Ecuador (17)
- El Salvador (4)
- Guatemala (12)
- Honduras (1)
- (Mexico) México (19)
- Nicaragua (1)
- (Panama) Panamá (2)
- (Peru) Perú (4)
- Puerto Rico (6)
- United States (13)
- Venezuela (9)

== See also ==
- 2013 Race Walking Year Ranking
