= Athletics at the 2023 Pan American Games – Men's 20 kilometres walk =

Men's 20 kilometres walk at the 2023 Pan American Games
- Venue: Streets of Santiago
- Dates: October 29
- Competitors: 15 from 9 nations
- Winning time: 1:19:20

Medalists
| Gold medal | David Hurtado | Ecuador |
| Silver medal | Caio Bonfim | Brazil |
| Bronze medal | Andrés Olivas | Mexico |

The men's 20 kilometres walk competition of the athletics events at the 2023 Pan American Games was held on October 29 on the streets of Santiago, Chile.

== Records ==
| World record | Yusuke Suzuki (JPN) | 1:16:36 | Nomi, Japan | March 15, 2015 |
| Pan American Games record | Bernardo Segura (MEX) | 1:20:17 | Winnipeg, Canada | July 26, 1999 |

== Schedule ==
| Date | Time | Round |
|---|---|---|
| October 29, 2023 | 6:00 | Final |

== Abbreviations ==
- All times shown are in hours:minutes:seconds

| KEY: | NR | National record | PB | Personal best | SB | Seasonal best | DQ | Disqualified | DNF | Did not finished |

== Results ==
| Rank | Athlete | Nation | Time | Notes |
|---|---|---|---|---|
| 1st place, gold medalist(s) | David Hurtado | Ecuador | 1:19:20 | GR |
| 2nd place, silver medalist(s) | Caio Bonfim | Brazil | 1:19:24 | |
| 3rd place, bronze medalist(s) | Andrés Olivas | Mexico | 1:19:56 | |
| 4 | José Alejandro Barrondo | Independent Athletes Team | 1:20:15 | |
| 5 | Matheus Corrêa | Brazil | 1:20:19 | |
| 6 | José Luis Doctor | Mexico | 1:20:33 | |
| 7 | César Rodríguez | Peru | 1:20:49 | |
| 8 | Luis Henry Campos | Peru | 1:22:03 | |
| 9 | Evan Dunfee | Canada | 1:22:14 | |
| 10 | José Leonardo Montaña | Colombia | 1:26:12 | |
| 11 | José Ortiz | Independent Athletes Team | 1:28:16 | |
| 12 | Juan Manuel Cano | Argentina | 1:28:28 | |
| 13 | Nick Christie | United States | 1:30:00 | |
| 14 | Emmanuel Corvera | United States | 1:36:21 | |
| 15 | Brian Pintado | Ecuador | DNF | |
| 16 | Yassir Cabrera | Panama | DNF | |
