= Athletics at the 2019 Pan American Games – Men's 50 kilometres walk =

Men's 50 kilometres walk at the 2019 Pan American Games
- Venue: Parque Kennedy
- Dates: August 11
- Competitors: 14 from 9 nations
- Winning time: 3:50:01

Medalists
Gold medal	Claudio Villanueva	Ecuador
Silver medal	Horacio Nava	Mexico
Bronze medal	Diego Pinzón	Colombia

The men's 50 kilometres walk competition of the athletics events at the 2019 Pan American Games took place on 11 August on a temporary circuit around the Parque Kennedy in Lima, Peru. The defending Pan American Games champion was Andrés Chocho of Ecuador.

== Records ==
World Record	Yohann Diniz (FRA)	3:32:33	Zürich, Switzerland	August 15, 2014
Pan American Games record	Carlos Mercenario (MEX)	3:47:55	Mar del Plata, Argentina	March 24, 1995

== Schedule ==
Date	Time	Round
August 11, 2019	7:00	Final

== Abbreviations ==
- All times shown are in hours:minutes:seconds

KEY:	q	Fastest non-qualifiers	Q	Qualified	NR	National record	PB	Personal best	SB	Seasonal best	DQ	Disqualified

== Results ==
The results were as follows:

Rank	Athlete	Nation	Time	Notes
1st place, gold medalist(s)	Claudio Villanueva	Ecuador	3:50:01	SB
2nd place, silver medalist(s)	Horacio Nava	Mexico	3:51:45	SB
3rd place, bronze medalist(s)	Diego Pinzón	Colombia	3:53:49	PB
4	Caio Bonfim	Brazil	3:57:54	
5	Matthew Forgues	United States	4:19:28	
	Érick Barrondo	Guatemala	DNF	
	Luis Henry Campos	Peru	DNF	
	Mathieu Bilodeau	Canada	DNF	
	Nicholas Christie	United States	DNF	
	Bernardo Barrondo	Guatemala	DSQ	
	Andrés Chocho	Ecuador	DSQ	
	Isaac Palma	Mexico	DSQ	
	Ronald Quispe	Bolivia	DSQ	
	Jorge Armando Ruiz	Colombia	DSQ	
