= Guatemala at the 2022 World Athletics Championships =

- Flag of Guatemala
- WA code: GUA

in Eugene, United States 15 July 2022 – 24 July 2022
- Competitors: 9 (6 men and 3 women)
- Medals: Gold 0 Silver 0 Bronze 0 Total 0

World Athletics Championships appearances
- 1983; 1987; 1991; 1993; 1995; 1997; 1999; 2001; 2003; 2005; 2007; 2009; 2011; 2013; 2015; 2017; 2019; 2022; 2023

Guatemala competed at the 2022 World Athletics Championships in Eugene, United States, from 15 to 24 July 2022.

== Results ==
Guatemala has entered 9 athletes.

Key

- Q = Qualified for the next round
- q = Qualified for the next round as a fastest loser or, in field events, by position without achieving the qualifying target
- NR = National record
- PB = Personal best
- SB = Season best
- N/A = Round not applicable for the event

=== Men ===
Track and road events

Athlete	Event	Heat		Final	
Athlete	Event	Result	Rank	Result	Rank
Luis Grijalva	5000 m	13:14.04	3 Q	13:10.44	4
José Alejandro Barrondo	20 km walk	—		DQ	
José Oswaldo Calel	20 km walk	—		1:26:24	27
José Ortiz	20 km walk	—		1:23:48	21
Érick Barrondo	35 km walk	—			
Luis Ángel Sánchez	35 km walk	—		DQ	

=== Women ===
Track and road events

Athlete	Event	Final	
Athlete	Event	Result	Rank
Maidy Monge	20 km walk	DSQ	
Mirna Ortiz	35 km walk	2:54:00	15
Yasury Palacios	35 km walk	3:01:16	25
