= 2018 IAAF World U20 Championships – Men's 10,000 metres walk =

Men's 10,000 metres walk at the 2018 World U20 Championships
- Venue: Ratina Stadium
- Dates: 14 July
- Competitors: 34 from 23 nations
- Winning time: 40:32.06

Medalists
gold medal	Yao Zhang	China
silver medal	David Hurtado	Ecuador
bronze medal	José Ortiz	Guatemala

The men's 10,000 metres race walk at the 2018 IAAF World U20 Championships was held at Ratina Stadium on 14 July.

== Records ==
Standing records prior to the 2018 IAAF World U20 Championships
World U20 Record	Viktor Burayev (RUS)	38:46.4	Moscow, Russia	20 May 2000
Championship Record	Daisuke Matsunaga (JPN)	39:27.19	Eugene, United States	25 July 2014
World U20 Leading	Sho Sakazaki (JPN)	40:17.82	Wakayama, Japan	21 January 2018

== Results ==
Rank	Name	Nationality	Time	Note
1st place, gold medalist(s)	Yao Zhang	China	40:32.06	PB
2nd place, silver medalist(s)	David Hurtado	Ecuador	40:32.06	PB
3rd place, bronze medalist(s)	José Ortiz	Guatemala	40:45.26	PB
4	Declan Tingay	Australia	40:49.72	AU20R
5	Zhaozhao Wang	China	41:04.22	
6	Kyle Swan	Australia	41:24.12	PB
7	Dominic Samson Ndigiti	Kenya	41:30.52	SB
8	Sho Sakazaki	Japan	41:50.91	
9	Mikita Kaliada	Belarus	41:51.76	PB
10	Tatsuhiko Nagayama	Japan	41:58.12	
11	Georgios Tzatzimakis	Greece	42:03.85	PB
12	Yohanis Algaw	Ethiopia	42:10.12	SB
13	Anderson Callejas	Colombia	42:32.01	PB
14	Łukasz Niedziałek	Poland	42:36.66	PB
15	José Manuel Pérez	Spain	42:41.26	PB
16	Riccardo Orsoni	Italy	42:53.76	
17	Matheus Correa	Brazil	42:55.70	PB
18	David Kuster	France	43:24.29	
19	Álvaro López	Spain	43:38.84	PB
20	Mingyu Kim	South Korea	43:46.20	
21	Antonio Loja	Ecuador	44:04.90	
22	Jan Moreu	Puerto Rico	44:16.40	
23	Pavel Olkhovik	Belarus	44:21.41	
24	Dongmin Im	South Korea	44:38.72	
25	Abdulselam İmuk	Turkey	44:40.20	
26	Andriy Syndyuk	Ukraine	44:52.67	
27	Viktor Kononenko	Ukraine	45:19.29	
28	Nicolas Fanelli	Italy	45:54.09	
29	Aníbal Zapeta	Guatemala	45:59.37	
30	Abdulrahman Mahmoud	Egypt	46:02.30	PB
31	Othman Chibani	Algeria	46:26.73	
32	Bálint Sárossi	Hungary	46:43.77	
33	Abdülaziz Daniş	Turkey	46:49.51	
	José Gilberto Menjivar	El Salvador	DQ	
