= Athletics at the 2015 Pan American Games – Men's 20 kilometres walk =

Men's 20 kilometres walk at the 2015 Pan American Games
- Venue: Ontario Place West Channel
- Dates: July 19
- Competitors: 15 from 11 nations
- Winning time: 1:23:06

Medalists
Gold medal	Evan Dunfee	Canada
Silver medal	Iñaki Gómez	Canada
Bronze medal	Caio Bonfim	Brazil

The men's 20 kilometres walk competition of the athletics events at the 2015 Pan American Games took place on the 19 of July on a temporary circuit around the Ontario Place West Channel. The defending Pan American Games champion is Érick Barrondo of Guatemala.

Walking on home soil, Evan Dunfee was frustrated by the slow pace 1 km into the race, so he decided to make what turned into a one-man breakaway for victory. His Canadian training partner Iñaki Gómez came in second more than a minute back after fighting a strategic battle with the rest of the field until the last lap.

== Records ==
World Record	Vladimir Kanaykin (RUS)	1:17:16	Saransk, Russia	September 29, 2007
Pan American Games record	Bernardo Segura (MEX)	1:20:17	Winnipeg, Canada	July 26, 1999

== Qualification ==
Each National Olympic Committee (NOC) was able to enter up to two entrants providing they had met the minimum standard (1.30.00) in the qualifying period (January 1, 2014 to June 28, 2015).

== Schedule ==
Date	Time	Round
July 19, 2015		Final

== Abbreviations ==
- All times shown are in hours:minutes:seconds

KEY:	q	Fastest non-qualifiers	Q	Qualified	NR	National record	PB	Personal best	SB	Seasonal best	DQ	Disqualified

== Results ==
=== Final ===
Rank	Athlete	Nation	Time	Notes
1st place, gold medalist(s)	Evan Dunfee	Canada	1:23:06	
2nd place, silver medalist(s)	Iñaki Gómez	Canada	1:24:25	
3rd place, bronze medalist(s)	Caio Bonfim	Brazil	1:24:43	
4	Julio César Salazar	Mexico	1:25:11	
5	Éider Arévalo	Colombia	1:25:50	
6	Marco Antonio Rodríguez	Bolivia	1:26:59	
7	Eder Sánchez	Mexico	1:28:16	
8	Juan Manuel Cano	Argentina	1:29:06	
9	José María Raymundo	Guatemala	1:35:45	
10	Luis Lopez	El Salvador	1:42:03	
	Mauricio Arteaga	Ecuador	DNF	
	Yerko Araya	Chile	DQ	
	Iván Garrido	Colombia	DQ	
	Érick Barrondo	Guatemala	DQ	
	Richard Vargas	Venezuela	DQ	
