= Caio Bonfim =

Brazilian racewalker (born 1991)

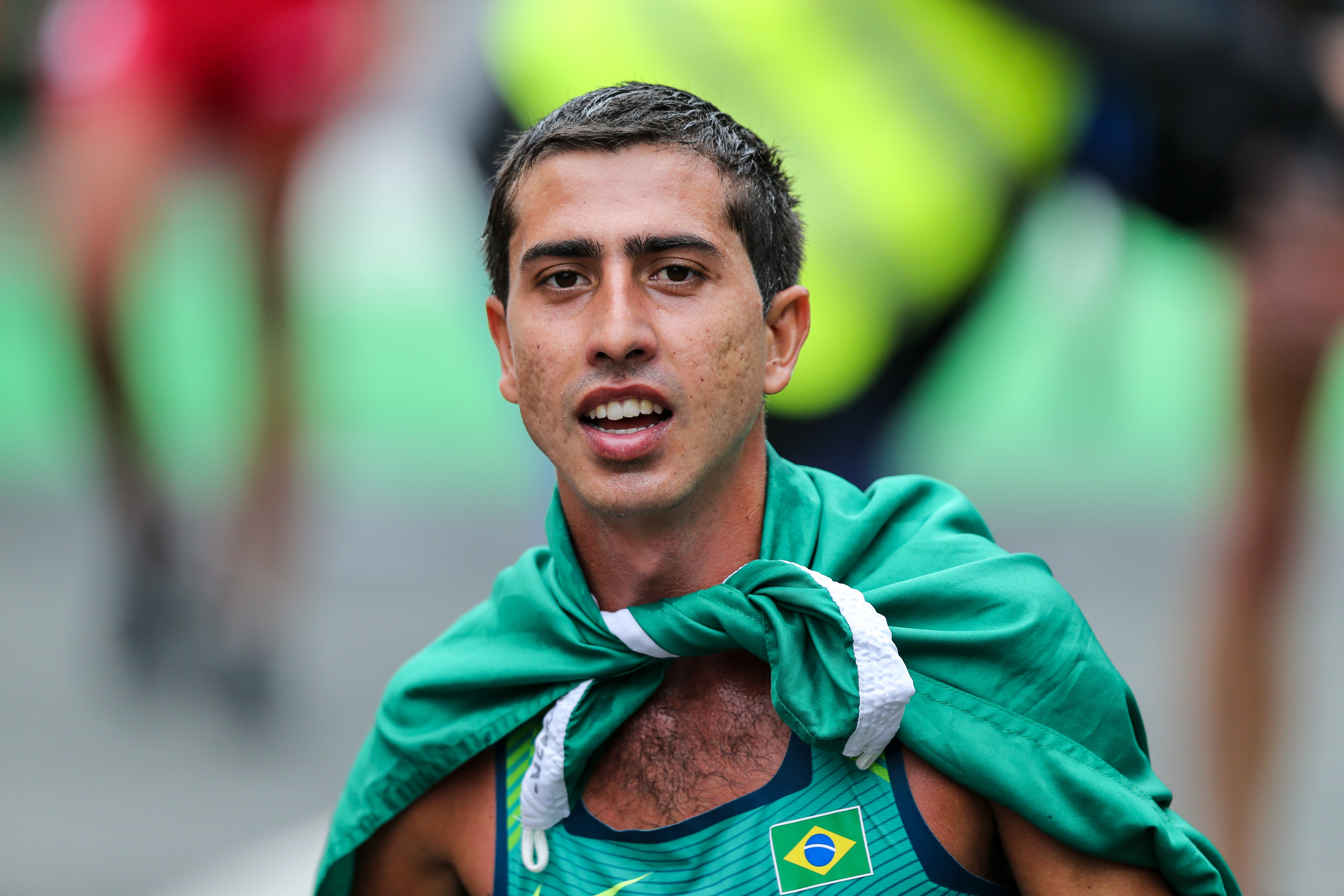
- Bonfim in 2019

Personal information
- Full name: Caio Oliveira de Sena Bonfim
- Born: 19 March 1991 (age 35) Sobradinho, Federal District, Brazil
- Height: 1.74 m (5 ft 9 in)
- Weight: 60 kg (132 lb)

Sport
- Country: Brazil
- Sport: Athletics
- Event: Race walking
Medal record
Representing Brazil
Men's athletics
Olympic Games
Silver medal – second place	2024 Paris	20 km walk
World Championships
Gold medal – first place	2025 Tokyo	20 km walk
Silver medal – second place	2025 Tokyo	35 km walk
Bronze medal – third place	2017 London	20 km walk
Bronze medal – third place	2023 Budapest	20 km walk
World Team Championships
Bronze medal – third place	2026 Brasília	Half marathon walk
Pan American Games
Silver medal – second place	2019 Lima	20 km walk
Silver medal – second place	2023 Santiago	20 km walk
Bronze medal – third place	2015 Toronto	20 km walk
Bronze medal – third place	2023 Santiago	Marathon walk relay
Pan American Cup
Gold medal – first place	2013 Guatemala City	20 km walk (team)
Silver medal – second place	2015 Arica	20 km walk
Silver medal – second place	2021 Guayaquil	20 km walk
Bronze medal – third place	2013 Guatemala City	20 km walk
Ibero-American Championships
Gold medal – first place	2016 Rio de Janeiro	20,000 m walk
Silver medal – second place	2022 Alicante	10,000 m walk
South American Games
Gold medal – first place	2022 Asunción	35 km walk
Gold medal – first place	2026 Santa Fe	Half marathon walk
Bronze medal – third place	2010 Medellín	20,000 m walk
Bronze medal – third place	2022 Asunción	20 km walk
South American Championships
Gold medal – first place	2013 Cartagena	20,000 m walk
South American Race Walking Championships
Gold medal – first place	2012 Salinas	20 km walk
Gold medal – first place	2012 Salinas	20 km walk (team)
Gold medal – first place	2020 Lima	20 km walk
Gold medal – first place	2024 Recife	20 km walk
Silver medal – second place	2022 Lima	20 km walk
Pan American U20 Championships
Silver medal – second place	2009 Port of Spain	10,000 m walk
South American U23 Championships
Gold medal – first place	2012 São Paulo	20,000 m walk

Caio Oliveira de Sena Bonfim (born 19 March 1991) is a Brazilian racewalker. In the 20 km walk, he is the reigning World Champion, having won the gold medal at the 2025 World Athletics Championships. He was a silver medalist at the 2024 Olympic Games. He also finished 4th at the 2016 Olympic Games. His mother, Gianetti Bonfim, was also an international racewalker for Brazil.

== Career ==
He competed in the 20 km walk at the 2012 Summer Olympics, where he placed 39th.

In 2013 he won bronze at the Pan American Race Walking Cup.

In May 2015 he won silver at the Pan American Race Walking Cup.

At the 2015 Pan American Games, he won a bronze medal in the Men's 20 kilometres walk with a time of 1:24:43. He broke a 24-year fast without Brazil winning medals in this event at the Pan American Games, since Marcelo Palma's bronze in 1991.

At the 2015 IAAF World Championships, he finished 6th with a time of 1:20:44, equaling Brazil's best result in the sport at World Championships. Bonfim repeated the position of Sérgio Galdino from Santa Catarina at the World Championship in Stuttgart (Germany), in 1993.

At the 2016 Summer Olympics in Rio de Janeiro, Bonfim competed well. In the Men's 20 kilometres walk, he finished 4th with a time of 1:19:42, a Brazilian record, just 5 seconds behind the bronze medalist. In the Men's 50 kilometres walk, he finished 9th, again breaking the Brazilian record with a time of 3:47:02.

At the 2017 World Championships held in London, Bonfim won the bronze medal, the first for a Brazilian in this sport, in the 20 km walk, again lowering his Brazilian record, with a mark of 1:19:04.

At the 2019 Pan American Games held in Lima, he won the silver medal in the 20 km walk, just 7 seconds behind Ecuadorian Brian Daniel Alvez. He also finished 4th in the 50 km walk.

He qualified to represent Brazil at the 2020 Summer Olympics.

In May 2021 he won silver at the Pan American Race Walking Cup.

At the 2022 South American Games he won a gold medal in the 35 km walk and a bronze medal in the 20 km walk. With this, he was chosen as the male flag bearer for Team Brazil at the Closing Ceremony of the South American Games.

At the 2023 World Athletics Championships, Bonfim won his second bronze medal at the World Championships in the Men's 20 kilometres walk, breaking the Brazilian record, with a time of 1:17.47.

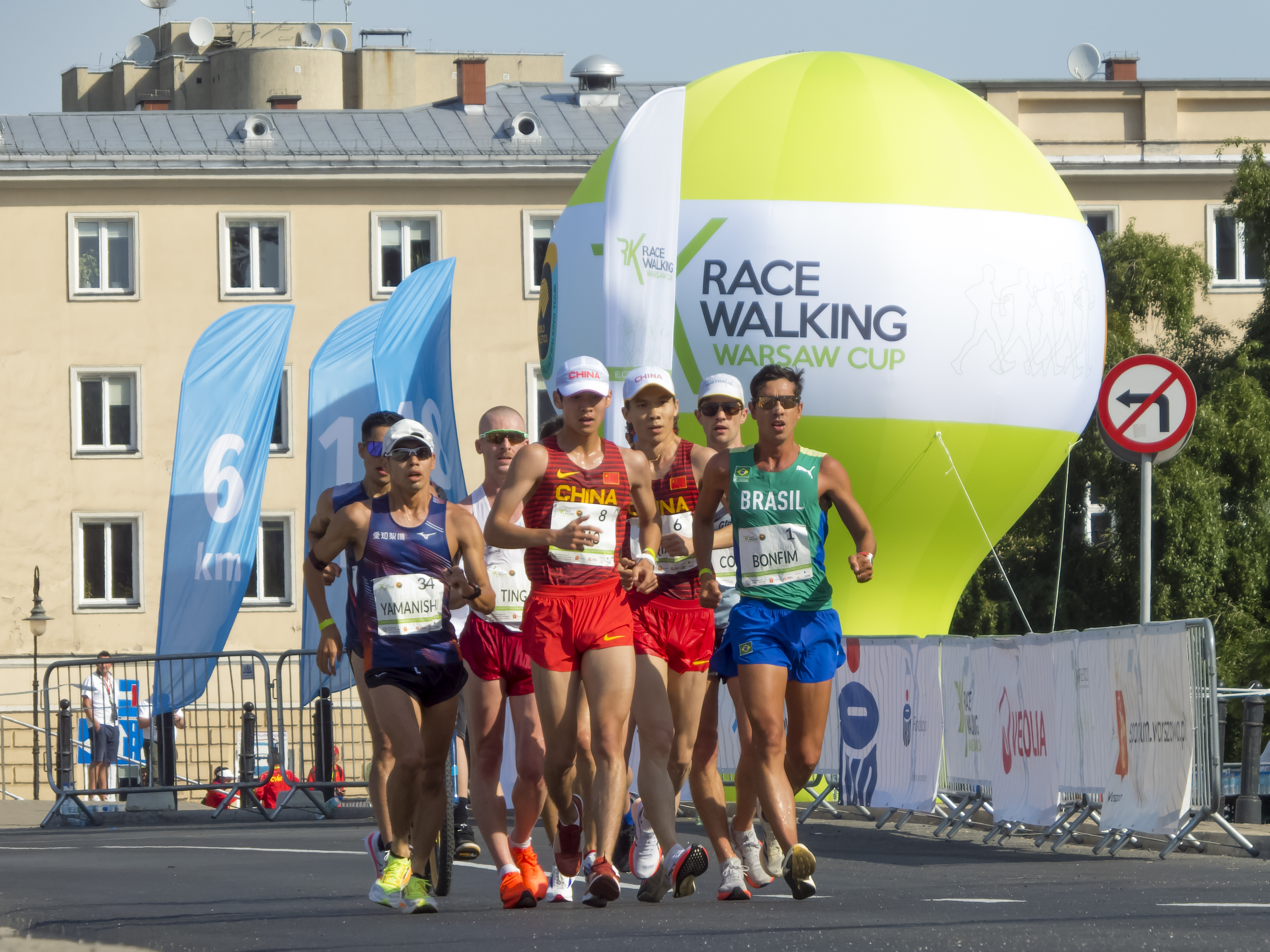
Bonfim leading a race in 2024

At the 2023 Pan American Games, Bonfim won silver in the 20 kilometres walk, completing the race in 1:19.24. During the 20 km, he took the lead a few times, alternating with David Hurtado, who finished in front with 1:19.20 and broke the Pan American Games record. In the debut of the Race walk mixed team, Bonfim and Viviane Lyra obtained the bronze medal.

In March 2024, at the Taicang GP, in China, he broke the Brazilian record for the 20 km walk, which was already his, with a time of 1.17:44. This time is just 23 seconds off the South American record of 1.17:21, set by the Ecuadorian Jefferson Pérez and 1 minute and 8 seconds off the world record of 1:16.36 made by the Japanese Yusuke Suzuki.

At the 2024 Summer Olympics, he won the silver medal in the 20 km race walk, the first in Brazil's history.

At the 2025 World Athletics Championships, he became the World Champion in the 20 km race walk, becoming the first Brazilian to do so in a race walking event at the World Athletics Championships.

== Personal bests ==
=== Road walk ===
- 10 km: 39:03 min – (Spain) Madrid, 30 Apr 2023
- 20 km: 1:17:44 hrs – (China) Taicang, 3 Mar 2024
- 50 km: 3:47:02 hrs – (Brazil) Rio de Janeiro, 19 Aug 2016

=== Track walk ===
- 5000 m: 19:47.99 min – (Brazil) Fortaleza, 11 May 2011
- 10,000 m: 39:57.59 min (ht) – (Spain) La Nucia, 21 May 2022
- 20,000 m: 1:19:52.1h hrs (ht) – (Brazil) Bragança Paulista, 27 June 2024

== International competitions ==
Year	Competition	Venue	Position	Event	Notes
Representing Brazil
2007	Pan American Race Walking Cup (U20)	Balneário Camboriú, Brazil	8th	10 km	45:40
2007	Pan American Race Walking Cup (U20)	Balneário Camboriú, Brazil	2nd	Team (10 km)	11 pts
2007	Pan American Junior Championships	São Paulo, Brazil	5th	10,000 m track walk	44:34.95
2007	World Youth Championships	Ostrava, Czech Republic	12th	10,000 m track walk	45:16.88
2008	South American Race Walking Championships (U-18)	Cochabamba, Bolivia	2nd	10 km	47:00 min
2008	World Race Walking Cup (U20)	Cheboksary, Russia	—	10 km	DQ
2008	World Junior Championships	Bydgoszcz, Poland	6th	10,000 m track walk	42:18.33
2008	South American Youth Championships	Lima, Peru	1st	10,000 m track walk	43:21.9 min CR
2009	Pan American Race Walking Cup (U20)	San Salvador, El Salvador	1st	10 km	43:04 min
2009	Pan American Race Walking Cup (U20)	San Salvador, El Salvador	3rd	Team (10 km)	17 pts
2009	South American Junior Championships	São Paulo, Brazil	1st	10,000 m track walk	42:43.58
2009	Pan American Junior Championships	Port of Spain, Trinidad and Tobago	2nd	10,000 m track walk	42:43.58
2010	South American Race Walking Championships (U20)	Cochabamba, Bolivia	1st	10 km	43:08 min
2010	South American Race Walking Championships (U20)	Cochabamba, Bolivia	2nd	Team (10 km)	12 pts
2010	South American Under-23 Championships / South American Games	Medellín, Colombia	3rd	20,000 m track walk	1:33:05.1
2010	World Race Walking Cup (U20)	Chihuahua, Mexico	—	10 km	DQ
2010	World Junior Championships	Moncton, Canada	4th	10,000 m track walk	41:32.28
2011	Pan American Race Walking Cup	Envigado, Colombia	10th	20 km	1:31:00
2011	South American Championships	Buenos Aires, Argentina	4th	20,000 m track walk	1:20:58.5
2011	Universiade	Shenzhen, China	8th	20 km	1:27:19
2011	World Championships	Daegu, South Korea	22nd	20 km	1:24:29
2011	Pan American Games	Guadalajara, Mexico	—	20 km	DQ
2012	South American Race Walking Championships	Salinas, Ecuador	1st	20 km	1:23:59.0 hrs
2012	South American Race Walking Championships	Salinas, Ecuador	1st	Team (20 km)	15 pts
2012	World Race Walking Cup	Saransk, Russia	17th	20 km	1:22:05
2012	World Race Walking Cup	Saransk, Russia	14th	Team (20 km)	152 pts
2012	Olympic Games	London, United Kingdom	39th	20 km	1:24:45
2012	South American U-23 Championships	São Paulo, Brazil	1st	20,000 m track walk	1:23:22.83
2013	Pan American Race Walking Cup	Guatemala City, Guatemala	3rd	20 km	1:25:27
2013	Pan American Race Walking Cup	Guatemala City, Guatemala	1st	Team (20 km)	38 pts
2013	South American Championships	Cartagena, Colombia	1st	20,000 m track walk	1:24:28.40
2013	World Championships	Moscow, Russia	—	20 km	DQ
2014	South American Race Walking Championships	Cochabamba, Bolivia	—	20 km	DQ
2014	World Race Walking Cup	Taicang, China	16th	20 km	1:20:28
2014	Ibero-American Championships	São Paulo, Brazil	4th	20,000 m track walk	1:24:49.52
2015	Pan American Race Walking Cup	Arica, Chile	2nd	20 km	1:21:26
2015	World Championships	Beijing, China	6th	20 km walk	1:20:44
2016	World Race Walking Team Championships	Rome, Italy	8th	20 km	1:20:20
2016	Ibero-American Championships	Rio de Janeiro, Brazil	1st	20,000 m track walk	1:26:40.7
2016	2016 Olympics	Rio de Janeiro, Brazil	4th	20 km	1:19:42
2016	2016 Olympics	Rio de Janeiro, Brazil	9th	50 km	3:47:02
2017	World Championships	London, Great Britain	3rd	20 km walk	1:19:04
2019	Pan American Games	Lima, Peru	2nd	20 km	1:21:57
2019	Pan American Games	Lima, Peru	4th	50 km	3:57:54
