= Guatemala at the 2017 World Championships in Athletics =

- Flag of Guatemala
- WA code: GUA
- National federation: Guatemalan Athletics Federation
- Website: atletismoguatemala.com (in Spanish)

in London, United Kingdom 4–13 August 2017
- Competitors: 7 (6 men and 1 woman) in 3 events
- Medals: Gold 0 Silver 0 Bronze 0 Total 0

World Championships in Athletics appearances
- 1983; 1987; 1991; 1993; 1995; 1997; 1999; 2001; 2003; 2005; 2007; 2009; 2011; 2013; 2015; 2017; 2019; 2022; 2023

Guatemala competed at the 2017 World Championships in Athletics in London, United Kingdom, from 4–13 August 2017.

== Results ==
=== Men ===
Track and road events

Athlete	Event	Final	
Athlete	Event	Result	Rank
José Amado García	Marathon	2:25:03	58
Luis Carlos Rivero	Marathon	2:41:39	69
Juan Carlos Trujillo	Marathon	2:33:42 SB	67
Erick Barrondo	20 kilometres walk	1:21:34 SB	21
José Alejandro Barrondo	20 kilometres walk	1:23:47	40
José María Raymundo	20 kilometres walk	1:27:09	52

=== Women ===
Track and road events

Athlete	Event	Final	
Athlete	Event	Result	Rank
Mirna Ortiz	20 kilometres walk	1:30:01 SB	11
