= Guatemala at the 2009 World Championships in Athletics =

- WA code: GUA

in Berlin
- Competitors: 2 (both male)
- Medals: Gold 0 Silver 0 Bronze 0 Total 0

World Championships in Athletics appearances
- 1983; 1987; 1991; 1993; 1995; 1997; 1999; 2001; 2003; 2005; 2007; 2009; 2011; 2013; 2015; 2017; 2019; 2022; 2023; 2025

Guatemala competed at the 2009 World Championships in Athletics in Berlin, Germany, which were held from 15 to 23 August 2009. The athlete delegation consisted of two competitors, racewalker Luis Fernando García and long-distance runner José Amado García. Luis Fernando García competed in the men's 50 kilometres walk against 47 other race walkers and placed last of the 30 competitors that finished the race. José Amado García competed in the men's marathon against 97 other competitors and placed 47th out of the 69 competitors that finished the race. Both athletes achieved season's bests with their times.

== Background ==
The 2009 World Championships in Athletics were held at the Olympiastadion in Berlin, Germany. Under the auspices of the International Amateur Athletic Federation, this was the twelfth edition of the World Championships. It was held from 15 to 23 August 2009 and had 47 different events. Among the competing teams was Guatemala. For this edition of the World Championships in Athletics, racewalker Luis Fernando García and long-distance runner José Amado García competed for the nation.

== Results ==
Track and road events

Luis Fernando García competed in the finals of the men's 50 kilometres walk on 21 August 2009 against 47 other race walkers. There, he recorded a time of 4:18:13 for a new season's best and placed last out of the 30 competitors who completed the race without being disqualified. José Amado García competed in the finals of the men's marathon the following day against 97 other competitors. There, he recorded a time of 2:22:00 for a new season's best and placed 47th out of the 69 competitors who completed the race without being disqualified.

Event	Athletes	Final	
Event	Athletes	Result	Rank
50 km race walk	Luis Fernando García	4:18:13 SB	30
Marathon	José Amado García	2:22:00 SB	47
