= Athletics at the 2010 South American Games – Men's 20,000 metre walk =

The Men's 20,000m Walk event at the 2010 South American Games was held on March 21 at 8:00.

== Medalists ==
Gold	Silver	Bronze
Mauricio Arteaga; Ecuador	Omar Sierra; Colombia	Caio Bonfim; Brazil

== Records ==
Standing records prior to the 2010 South American Games
World record	Bernardo Segura	Mexico	1:17:25.6	Bergen, Norway	7 May 1994
South American record	Luis Fernando López	Colombia	1:20:53.6	Lima, Peru	21 June 2009

== Results ==
Results were published.

Rank	Athlete	Nationality	Result	Warnings	Notes
1st place, gold medalist(s)	Mauricio Arteaga	Ecuador	1:30:12.1		
2nd place, silver medalist(s)	Omar Sierra	Colombia	1:30:58.0		
3rd place, bronze medalist(s)	Caio Bonfim	Brazil	1:33:05.1	>	
4	Camilo Acuña	Chile	1:39:29.8	>>	
5	Felipe Toloza	Chile	1:41:48.5	>	
	Jonathan Cáceres	Ecuador	DSQ	>~~	
	Dejaime de Oliveira	Brazil	DSQ	>>>	

Intermediate times:

2000m	8:48.0	Mauricio Arteaga (ECU)
4000m	17:47.3	Dejaime de Oliveira (BRA)
6000m	26:52.6	Omar Sierra (COL)
8000m	36:14.1	Mauricio Arteaga (ECU)
10000m	45:10.2	Caio Bonfim (BRA)
12000m	54:12.2	Omar Sierra (COL)
14000m	1:02:54.3	Mauricio Arteaga (ECU)
16000m	1:11:46.8	Mauricio Arteaga (ECU)
18000m	1:20:52.6	Mauricio Arteaga (ECU)

== See also ==
- 2010 South American Under-23 Championships in Athletics
