= Diego Pinzón =

Colombian racewalker (born 1985)

Personal information
- Full name: Diego Juan Pinzón Florez
- Born: 12 February 1985 (age 41) Ciudad Bolivar, Colombia
- Height: 1.66 m (5 ft 5 in)
- Weight: 60 kg (132 lb)

Sport
- Country: Colombia
- Sport: Athletics
- Event: Race walking
Medal record
Men's athletics
Representing Colombia
Event	1st	2nd	3rd
Pan American Games	0	0	1
South American Games	0	0	1
Bolivarian Games	0	1	0
Total	0	1	2
Pan American Games
Bronze medal – third place	2019 Lima	50 km walk
South American Games
Bronze medal – third place	2022 Asunción	35 km walk
Bolivarian Games
Silver medal – second place	2022 Valledupar	35 km walk

Diego Juan Pinzón Florez (Note: In this Spanish name, the first or paternal surname is Pinzón and the second or maternal family name is Florez.) (born 12 February 1985) is a Colombian racewalking athlete. He represented Colombia at the 2020 Summer Olympics in Tokyo 2021, placing 18th in the men's 50 kilometres walk.
