= Andrés Chocho =

Ecuadorian race walker (born 1983)

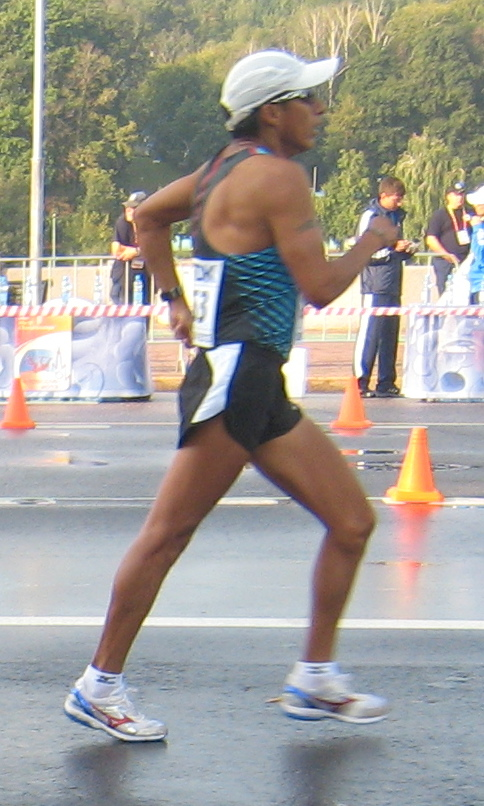
- Andrés Chocho in 2013

Personal information
- Full name: Cristian Andrés Chocho León
- Born: November 4, 1983 (age 42) Cuenca, Azuay
- Height: 1.65 m (5 ft 5 in)
- Weight: 55 kg (121 lb)
- Parent: Luis Chocho (died 2021) (father)

Sport
- Country: Ecuador
- Sport: Men's Athletics
- Event: Race walking
Medal record
Pan American Games
Gold medal – first place	2015 Toronto	50 km walk
Summer Universiade
Silver medal – second place	2011 Shenzhen	20 km walk
IAAF World Race Walking Team Championships
Bronze medal – third place	2016 Rome	Team 20 km walk
Bolivarian Games
Gold medal – first place	2013 Trujillo	50 km walk
South American Championships
Gold medal – first place	2011 Buenos Aires	20,000 m walk
Bronze medal – third place	2013 Cartagena	20,000 m walk
- Updated on 11 June 2014

Cristian Andrés Chocho León (born 4 November 1983) is an Ecuadorian race walker who competes in both the 20 km and 50 km walk events. He is the South American record holder in the 50 km (3:49:32 hours) and 20,000 metres (1:20:23.8 hours) walking events.

Chocho was the 2011 South American Champion over 20 km and was the bronze medallist at the 2011 Summer Universiade. His best global level finish is eleventh over 50 km at the 2011 World Championships in Athletics. He represented Ecuador at four Summer Olympics, won a gold medal in 50 km Walk in the 2015 Toronto Pan Am Games, and is a seven-time participant of the IAAF World Race Walking Cup.

== Career ==
Born in Cuenca, Ecuador (the same city as 1996 Olympic racewalk champion Jefferson Pérez), he began racewalking at a young age and made his international debut at 15 years old. He took third in both the youth 10 km at the 1999 South American Racewalking Cup and the 10,000 m walk at the 1999 South American Junior Championships in Athletics. The year after he improved to second at the youth section of the South American Cup, but was disqualified for lifting at the 2000 South American Junior Championships. In spite of this he was chosen to compete at the 2000 World Junior Championships in Athletics held in Santiago de Chile and came 24th. He ended the year with a win over 10,000 m at the 2000 South American Youth Championships in Athletics.

The 2001 South American Junior Championships in Athletics were held in conjunction with the 2001 Pan American Junior Athletics Championships in October and he won the South American 10,000 m walk title, while finishing second in the Pan American race behind Mexico's Horacio Nava. Later that month he won the 10 km junior road title at the South American Cup. In his final year of junior competition he was runner-up to Brazil's Rafael Duarte in the 2002 South American Junior Championships and placed eighteenth in the 10,000 m walk at the 2002 World Junior Championships in Athletics. That year also marked his senior debut at the 2002 IAAF World Race Walking Cup, where he took 34th place in the 20 km walk category, as well as a tenth-place finish at the South American Cup.

Chocho did not compete in major competition in 2003 but returned in 2004 he placed fifth in the South American Cup. He was disqualified at the IAAF World Race Walking Cup in both 2004 and 2006. He set a personal best of 1:22:31 hours for the 20 km walk at the Na Rynek Marsz meet in June 2007, but managed only 13th place at the 2007 Summer Universiade and was again disqualified at the 2007 World Championships in Athletics. He came ninth at the 2008 South American Race Walking Cup and managed finishes of 38th and 39th at the 2008 Beijing Olympics and the 2008 IAAF World Race Walking Cup, respectively. He also improved his best to 1:22:05 hours at that year's Na Rynek Marsz meet. His highlights of 2009 were a twelfth-place finish at the 2009 Summer Universiade and 39th place at the 2009 World Championships in Athletics.

Chocho was disqualified at the 2010 South American Cup, but managed 31st at the 2010 IAAF World Race Walking Cup. He debuted over the 50 km walk distance that October and set a time of 3:54:42 hours in Congers, New York. The 2011 season saw Chocho reach new heights in his career. He began with a win at the national championships, but failed to finish at the 2011 Pan American Race Walking Cup. He rebounded with a near-personal best of 1:22:18 hours to take eighth at Rio Maior's Grande Premio Internacional en Marcha Atletica. That June he broke the South American record for the 20,000 m walk at the 2011 South American Championships in Athletics, winning the gold medal in a time of 1:20:23.8 hours. He followed this with a bronze medal performance at the 2011 Summer Universiade.

Making his championship debut over the distance, Chocho proved himself more adept at the longer distance and took eleventh place at the 2011 World Championships in Athletics with a South American record time of 3:49:32 hours. He ended the year at the 2011 Pan American Games, but was disqualified in the 50 km walk event. He competed at the 2012 Summer Olympics but was disqualified just beyond an hour into the 50 km race having been shown three red cards.

In 2019, he competed in the men's 20 kilometres walk at the 2019 World Athletics Championships held in Doha, Qatar. He finished in 18th place. He also competed in the men's 50 kilometres walk. He did not finish his race.

Chocho represented Ecuador in the men's 50 kilometres walk at the 2020 Summer Olympics, finishing 19th with a season best.

== Personal life ==
Andres Chocho is the son of the olympic trainer, Luis Chocho (born 1957 in Cuenca Ecuador, died February 17, 2021, due to the complications for the COVID-19 disease to the age of 64 years old).

He is married to a Brazilian race walker, Érica de Sena, who he also coaches. Their son was born in 2022.

== Personal bests ==
=== Track walk ===
- 10,000 m: 40:29.71 min (ht) – Cuenca, Ecuador, 21 March 2016
- 20,000 m: 1:20:23.8 hrs (ht) – Buenos Aires, Argentina, 5 June 2011

=== Road walk ===
- 20 km: 1:20:07 hrs – Rome, Italy, 7 May 2016
- 50 km: 3:42:57 hrs NR– Ciudad Juárez, Mexico, 6 March 2016

== International competitions ==
Year	Competition	Venue	Position	Event	Notes
Representing Ecuador
1999	South American Race Walking Cup	Cochabamba, Bolivia	3rd	10 km walk (youth)	50:07
1999	South American Junior Championships	Concepción, Chile	3rd	10,000 m walk	44:43.08
2000	South American Race Walking Cup	Lima, Peru	2nd	10 km walk (youth)	48:09
2000	Pan American Race Walking Cup	Poza Rica, Mexico	17th	20 km walk	1:42:44
2000	South American Junior Championships	São Leopoldo, Brazil	—	10,000 m walk	DQ
2000	World Junior Championships	Santiago, Chile	24th	10,000 m walk	46:17.66
2000	South American Youth Championships	Bogotá, Colombia	1st	10,000 m walk	47:52.68 A
2001	South American Junior Championships	Santa Fe, Argentina	1st	10,000 m walk	43:58.89
2001	Pan American Junior Championships	Santa Fe, Argentina	2nd	10,000 m walk	43:58.89
2001	South American Race Walking Cup	Cuenca, Ecuador	1st	10 km walk (junior)	45:55
2002	World Junior Championships	Kingston, Jamaica	18th	10,000 m walk	45:28.60
2002	South American Junior Championships / South American Games	Belém, Brazil	2nd	10,000 m walk	44:36.81
2002	World Race Walking Cup	Turin, Italy	34th	20 km walk	1:29:09
2002	South American Race Walking Cup	Puerto Saavedra, Chile	10th	20 km walk	1:33:29
2003	Pan American Race Walking Cup	Chula Vista, United States	14th	20 km walk	1:29:27
2003	Universiade	Daegu, South Korea	—	20 km walk	DNF
2004	South American Race Walking Championships	Los Ángeles, Chile	5th	20 km walk	1:24:29
2004	World Race Walking Cup	Naumburg, Germany	—	20 km walk	DQ
2005	Pan American Race Walking Cup	Lima, Peru	—	20 km walk	DNF
2006	South American Race Walking Championships	Cochabamba, Bolivia	6th	20 km walk	1:30:24
2006	World Race Walking Cup	A Coruña, Spain	—	20 km walk	DQ
2007	Pan American Race Walking Cup	Balneário Camboriú, Brazil	—	20 km walk	DQ
2007	Universiade	Bangkok, Thailand	14th	20 km walk	1:31:24
2007	World Championships	Osaka, Japan	—	20 km walk	DQ
2008	South American Race Walking Championships	Cuenca, Ecuador	9th	20 km walk	1:31:27
2008	World Race Walking Cup	Cheboksary, Russia	39th	20 km walk	1:24:08
2008	Olympic Games	Beijing, China	38th	20 km walk	1:27:09
2009	South American Championships	Lima, Peru	—	20,000 m walk	DNF
2009	Universiade	Belgrade, Serbia	12th	20 km walk	1:24:51
2009	World Championships	Berlin, Germany	39th	20 km walk	1:29:14
2010	South American Race Walking Championships	Cochabamba, Bolivia	—	20 km walk	DQ
2010	World Race Walking Cup	Chihuahua, Mexico	31st	20 km walk	1:28:19
2011	Pan American Race Walking Cup	Envigado, Colombia	—	20 km walk	DNF
2011	South American Championships	Buenos Aires, Argentina	1st	20,000 m walk	1:20:23.8
2011	Universiade	Shenzhen, China	2nd	20 km walk	1:24:44
2011	World Championships	Daegu, South Korea	11th	50 km walk	3:49:32
2011	Pan American Games	Guadalajara, Mexico	—	50 km walk	DQ
2012	South American Race Walking Championships	Salinas, Ecuador	8th	20 km walk	1:30:24.4
2012	World Race Walking Cup	Saransk, Russia	—	50 km walk	DQ
2012	Olympic Games	London, United Kingdom	—	50 km walk	DQ
2013	South American Championships	Cartagena, Colombia	3rd	20,000 m walk	1:26:20.98
2013	World Championships	Moscow, Russia	—	50 km walk	DQ
2013	Bolivarian Games	Trujillo, Peru	1st	50 km walk	3:58:50
2014	South American Games	Santiago, Chile	—	20,000 m walk	DQ
2014	World Race Walking Cup	Taicang, China	—	50 km walk	DQ
2015	World Championships	Beijing, China	—	20 km walk	DQ
2015	World Championships	Beijing, China	8th	50 km walk	3:46:00
2016	South American Race Walking Championships	Guayaquil, Ecuador	1st	20 km walk	1:24:11
2016	World Race Walking Cup	Rome, Italy	6th (team: (bronze) )	20 km walk	1:20:07
2016	Olympic Games	Rio de Janeiro, Brazil	—	50 km walk	DQ
2017	World Championships	London, United Kingdom	–	50 km walk	DQ
2017	Bolivarian Games	Santa Marta, Colombia	1st	50 km walk	4:14:20
2018	South American Games	Cochabamba, Bolivia	1st	50 km walk	3:55:48
2019	World Championships	Doha, Qatar	18th	20 km walk	1:32:49
2019	World Championships	Doha, Qatar	–	50 km walk	DNF
2021	South American Championships	Guayaquil, Ecuador	1st	20,000 m walk	1:24:18.94
2021	Olympic Games	Sapporo, Japan	19th	50 km walk	3:59:03
2022	Ibero-American Championships	La Nucía, Spain	–	10,000 m walk	DNF
2022	World Championships	Eugene, United States	24th	35 km walk	2:33:28
2022	South American Games	Asunción, Paraguay	–	35 km walk	DNF
