= Athletics at the 2011 Pan American Games – Men's 50 kilometres walk =

Men's 50 kilometres walk at the 2011 Pan American Games
- Venue: Guadalajara Circuit and Route
- Dates: October 29
- Competitors: 16 from 9 nations
- Winning time: 3:48:58

Medalists
Gold medal	Horacio Nava	Mexico
Silver medal	José Leyver	Mexico
Bronze medal	Jaime Quiyuch	Guatemala

The men's 50 kilometres walk competition of the athletics events at the 2011 Pan American Games took place on the 29 of October at the Guadalajara Circuit and Route. The defending Pan American Games champion was Xavier Moreno of Ecuador.

== Records ==
World Record	Denis Nizhegorodov (RUS)	3:34:14	Cheboksary, Russia	May 11, 2008
Pan American Games record	Carlos Mercenario (MEX)	3:47:55	Mar del Plata, Argentina	March 24, 1995

== Qualification standards ==
This event did not require any qualification standard be met.

== Schedule ==
Date	Time	Round
October 29, 2011	7:30	Final

== Abbreviations ==
- All times shown are in hours:minutes:seconds

DNF	did not finish
PR	pan American games record
WR	world record
DQ	disqualified
NR	national record
PB	personal best
SB	season best

== Results ==
16 athletes from 9 countries competed.

=== Final ===
Rank	Rider	Time	Notes
1st place, gold medalist(s)	Horacio Nava (MEX)	3:48:58	
2nd place, silver medalist(s)	José Leyver (MEX)	3:49:16	PB
3rd place, bronze medalist(s)	Jaime Quiyuch (GUA)	3:50:33	PB
4	Fredy Hernández (COL)	4:00:12	
5	Jonathan Rieckmann (BRA)	4:04:07	PB
6	Emerson Hernández (ESA)	4:12:53	
7	Néstor Rueda (COL)	4:17:40	
8	Bernardo Calvo (CRC)	4:21:19	NR
9	Benjamin Shorey (USA)	4:33:25	
	Anibal Paau (GUA)	DNF	
	Rolando Saquipay (ECU)	DNF	
	Allan Segura (CRC)	DNF	
	Edward Araya (CHI)	DQ	
	Andrés Chocho (ECU)	DQ	
	Mario Santos Junior (BRA)	DQ	
	David Talcott (USA)	DQ	
