= Lee Jeong-eun (race walker) =

South Korean racewalker (born 1994)

Personal information
- Born: 13 September 1994 (age 31)

Sport
- Country: South Korea
- Sport: Track and field

Korean name
- Hangul: 이정은
- RR: I Jeongeun
- MR: I Chŏngŭn
- Updated on 29 August 2015

Lee Jeong-eun (Korean: 이정은; Korean pronunciation: [i.dʑʌŋ.ɯn] or [i] [tɕʌŋ.ɯn]; born 13 September 1994) is a professional female racewalker from South Korea. She competed in the Women's 20 kilometres walk event at the 2015 World Championships in Athletics in Beijing, China.
