= 2015 World Championships in Athletics – Women's 20 kilometres walk =

Women's 20 kilometres walk at the 2015 World Championships
- Venue: Beijing National Stadium
- Dates: 28 August
- Competitors: 49 from 27 nations
- Winning time: 1:27:45

Medalists
gold medal	Liu Hong	China
silver medal	Lü Xiuzhi	China
bronze medal	Lyudmyla Olyanovska	Ukraine

Video on YouTube Official Video

The women's 20 kilometres race walk at the 2015 World Championships in Athletics was held at the Beijing National Stadium on 28 August.

== Summary ==
The defending champion Elena Lashmanova would not be here, while she serves her drug suspension. In fact the entire Russian team did not compete here amid the drug scandal surrounding their coach Viktor Chegin. It looked like world record holder, world leader Liu Hong, walking on home soil was the prohibitive favorite. Liu's one complication was her teammate Xiuzhi Lu. Like in the men's race, the two Chinese walkers took off hard from the start, only Anežka Drahotová tried to go with them. That lasted about 4 km, from that point on the two walkers were out on their own almost tied by a string, swapping the lead occasionally though Lu was setting the pace the majority of the time. They hit 5K in 22:24; 10K in 44:19 (21:55 split) with a 30-second lead and 15K in 1:06:24 (22:05 split). The chase pack was Lyudmyla Olyanovska, Elisa Rigaudo, Eleonora Giorgi and Érica de Sena. de Sena was the first to fall off pace around 12K, both of the Italians were later asked to leave the course. Between 10 and 15K the lead actually shrunk to 20 seconds, but the closing 5K in 21:22 settled it for everyone but the two Chinese walkers. They battled neck and neck until just about the time they re-entered the stadium, when Lu seemed to concede to Liu and walked the remainder on the track in her footsteps. With the domestic crowd going crazy, Lu crossed the finish line virtually in Liu's shadow, the separation of 0.26 seconds giving the closest finish for a race walk in World Athletics Championships history. Because it is a road course, the official times are accurate to only one second so both athlete's times round to the same time. Olyanovska continued to hold on, finishing just 28 seconds back for bronze. The rest of the field finished more than 1:15 behind her. It was the first gold medal for the home team at these championships.

== Records ==
Prior to the competition, the records were as follows:

World record	Liu Hong (CHN)	1:24:38	La Coruña, Spain	6 June 2015
Championship record	Olimpiada Ivanova (RUS)	1:25:41	Helsinki, Finland	7 August 2005
World Leading	Liu Hong (CHN)	1:24:38	La Coruña, Spain	6 June 2015
African Record	Grace Wanjiru (KEN)	1:34:19	Nairobi, Kenya	1 August 2010
Asian Record	Liu Hong (CHN)	1:24:38	La Coruña, Spain	6 June 2015
North, Central American and Caribbean record	Mirna Ortiz (GUA)	1:28:31	Rio Maior, Portugal	6 April 2013
South American Record	Érica de Sena (BRA)	1:29:37	Dudince, Slovakia	21 March 2015
European Record	Elena Lashmanova (RUS)	1:25:02	London, Great Britain	11 August 2012
Oceanian record	Jane Saville (AUS)	1:27:44	Naumburg, Germany	2 May 2004

== Qualification standards ==
Time
1:36:00

== Schedule ==
Date	Time	Round
28 August 2015	08:30	Final

All times are local times (UTC+8)

== Results ==
The race was started at 08:30.

Rank	Name	Nationality	Time	Notes
1st place, gold medalist(s)	Liu Hong	China	1:27:45	
2nd place, silver medalist(s)	Lü Xiuzhi	China	1:27:45	
3rd place, bronze medalist(s)	Lyudmyla Olyanovska	Ukraine	1:28:13	
4	Ana Cabecinha	Portugal	1:29:29	
5	Antonella Palmisano	Italy	1:29:34	
6	Érica de Sena	Brazil	1:30:06	
7	Brigita Virbalytė	Lithuania	1:30:20	PB
8	Anežka Drahotová	Czech Republic	1:30:32	
9	Alejandra Ortega	Mexico	1:31:04	PB
10	María José Poves	Spain	1:31:06	SB
11	Nadiya Borovska	Ukraine	1:31:18	
12	Mirna Ortiz	Guatemala	1:31:32	
13	Rachel Seaman	Canada	1:31:39	
14	Raquel González	Spain	1:32:00	
15	Viktória Madarász	Hungary	1:32:01	
16	Paola Pérez	Ecuador	1:32:12	
17	Nie Jingjing	China	1:32:40	
18	Alana Barber	New Zealand	1:33:20	NR
19	Sandra Arenas	Colombia	1:33:24	
20	Maria Michta-Coffey	United States	1:33:24	
21	Vera Santos	Portugal	1:34:01	
22	Wendy Cornejo	Bolivia	1:34:12	PB
23	Inês Henriques	Portugal	1:34:47	
24	Claudia Ștef	Romania	1:34:51	
25	Kumiko Okada	Japan	1:34:56	
26	Miranda Melville	United States	1:35:19	
27	Jeon Yeong-eun	South Korea	1:35:48	
28	Maritza Poncio	Guatemala	1:35:53	
29	Cisiane Lopes	Brazil	1:36:06	
30	Mária Czaková	Slovakia	1:36:08	
31	Émilie Menuet	France	1:36:17	
32	Laura García-Caro	Spain	1:36:22	
33	Laura Polli	Switzerland	1:36:26	SB
34	Rachel Tallent	Australia	1:36:27	
35	Lee Jeong-eun	South Korea	1:36:52	
36	Lucie Pelantová	Czech Republic	1:38:34	
37	Khushbir Kaur	India	1:38:53	
38	Agnieszka Dygacz	Poland	1:39:06	
39	Mayra Herrera	Guatemala	1:39:23	
40	Marie Polli	Switzerland	1:39:49	
41	Mária Gáliková	Slovakia	1:40:06	
42	Olena Shumkina	Ukraine	1:41:30	
	Beki Smith	Australia	DQ	
	Claudia Balderrama	Bolivia	DQ	
	Sapana Sapana	India	DQ	
	Eleonora Giorgi	Italy	DQ	
	Elisa Rigaudo	Italy	DQ	
	Neringa Aidietytė	Lithuania	DQ	
	Kimberly García	Peru	DNF	
	Kelly Ruddick	Australia	DNS	
