= Claudio Villanueva =

Ecuadorian racewalker

Personal information
- Born: 3 August 1988 (age 37) Cuenca, Ecuador

Sport
- Sport: Race walking
Medal record
Representing Ecuador
Pan American Games
Gold medal – first place	2019 Lima	50 km walk

Claudio Paulino Villanueva Flores (born August 3, 1988) is an Ecuadorian racewalker. He placed 45th in the men's 50 kilometres walk at the 2016 Summer Olympics. He won the 2019 Pan American Games 50 kilometres race walk. In 2019, he competed in the men's 50 kilometres walk at the 2019 World Athletics Championships held in Doha, Qatar. He did not finish his race.

He represented Ecuador at the 2020 Summer Olympics.
