= Guatemala at the 2015 World Championships in Athletics =

- WA code: GUA

in Beijing
- Competitors: 7
- Medals: Gold 0 Silver 0 Bronze 0 Total 0

World Championships in Athletics appearances
- 1983; 1987; 1991; 1993; 1995; 1997; 1999; 2001; 2003; 2005; 2007; 2009; 2011; 2013; 2015; 2017; 2019; 2022; 2023; 2025

Guatemala competed at the 2015 World Championships in Athletics in Beijing, China, from 22 to 30 August 2015.

== Results ==
(q – qualified, NM – no mark, SB – season best)

=== Men ===
Track and road events

| Athlete | Event | Heat | | Semifinal | | Final | |
| Athlete | Event | Result | Rank | Result | Rank | Result | Rank |
|---|---|---|---|---|---|---|---|
| José María Raymundo | 20 km walk | —N/a | | | | 1:29:01 | 48 |
| Erick Barrondo | 50 km walk | —N/a | | | | DQ | |
| Jaime Quiyuch | 50 km walk | —N/a | | | | 3:57:41 | 29 |
| Luis Ángel Sánchez | 50 km walk | —N/a | | | | 4:09:26 | 36 |

=== Women ===
Track and road events

| Athlete | Event | Heat | | Semifinal | | Final | |
| Athlete | Event | Result | Rank | Result | Rank | Result | Rank |
|---|---|---|---|---|---|---|---|
| Mirna Ortiz | 20 km walk | —N/a | | | | 1:31:32 | 12 |
| Maritza Poncio | 20 km walk | —N/a | | | | 1:35:53 | 28 |
| Mayra Herrera | 20 km walk | —N/a | | | | 1:39:23 | 39 |
