= Athletics at the 2015 Pan American Games – Men's 50 kilometres walk =

Men's 50 kilometres walk at the 2015 Pan American Games
- Venue: Ontario Place West Channel
- Dates: July 26
- Competitors: 14 from 9 nations
- Winning time: 3:50:13

Medalists
Gold medal	Andrés Chocho	Ecuador
Silver medal	Erick Barrondo	Guatemala
Bronze medal	Horacio Nava	Mexico

The men's 50 kilometres walk competition of the athletics events at the 2015 Pan American Games took place on the 26 of July on a temporary circuit around the Ontario Place West Channel. The defending Pan American Games champion is Horacio Nava of Mexico.

== Records ==
World Record	Denis Nizhegorodov (RUS)	3:34:14	Cheboksary, Russia	May 11, 2008
Pan American Games record	Carlos Mercenario (MEX)	3:47:55	Mar del Plata, Argentina	March 24, 1995

== Qualification ==
Each National Olympic Committee (NOC) was able to enter up to two entrants providing they had met the minimum standard (4.18.00) in the qualifying period (January 1, 2014 to June 28, 2015).

== Schedule ==
Date	Time	Round
July 26, 2015		Final

== Abbreviations ==
- All times shown are in hours:minutes:seconds

KEY:	q	Fastest non-qualifiers	Q	Qualified	NR	National record	PB	Personal best	SB	Seasonal best	DQ	Disqualified

== Results ==
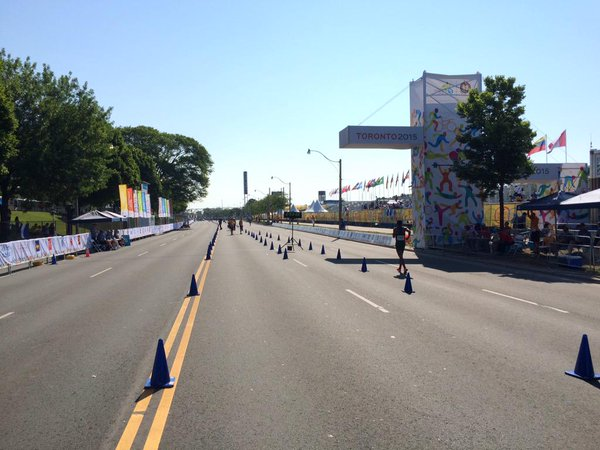
The men's 50km walk during the 2015 Pan American Games

=== Final ===
Rank	Athlete	Nation	Time	Notes
1st place, gold medalist(s)	Andrés Chocho	Ecuador	3:50:13	SB
2nd place, silver medalist(s)	Erick Barrondo	Guatemala	3:55:57	
3rd place, bronze medalist(s)	Horacio Nava	Mexico	3:57:28	
4	Jonnathan Cáceres	Ecuador	4:00:58	
5	Cristian Berdeja	Mexico	4:05:44	
6	James Rendón	Colombia	4:06:52	
7	Mario Alfonso Bran	Guatemala	4:15:06	
8	Cláudio dos Santos	Brazil	4:18:08	
	John Nunn	United States	DNF	
	Jonathan Riekmann	Brazil	DNF	
	Pavel Chihuán	Peru	DNF	
	Edward Araya	Chile	DSQ	
	Creighton Connolly	Canada	DSQ	
	Jorge Armando Ruiz	Colombia	DSQ	
