= Sapana Punia =

Indian racewalker

Sapana
Personal information
- Full name: Sapana Punia
- Born: 2 January 1988 (age 38)

Sport
- Country: India
- Sport: Track and field
- Updated on 29 August 2015

Sapana, also known as Sapana Punia (born 2 January 1988) is a female racewalker from Jaipur, Rajasthan, India. She competed in the Women's 20 kilometres walk event at the 2015 World Championships in Athletics in Beijing, China. She competed in the 20 km walk at the 2016 Summer Olympics in Rio de Janeiro, Brazil but did not finish. She set a national record in the 20 km walk at the 2015 National Games with at time of 1:40:35.70.

Punia is also a sub-inspector in the Rajasthan Police.
