= Mesías Zapata =

Ecuadorian racewalker

Personal information
- Full name: Magno Mesías Zapata
- Born: January 8, 1981 (age 45) Chillanes, Bolívar, Ecuador

Sport
- Country: Ecuador
- Sport: Men's Athletics
- Event: Racewalking
Medal record
Men's Racewalking
Representing Ecuador
Bolivarian Games
Gold medal – first place	2009 Sucre	50 km

Magno Mesías Zapata (born January 8, 1981, in Chillanes, Bolívar Province) is a male race walker from Ecuador. He competed for his native country at the 2007 Pan American Games. He won the bronze medal at the Pan American Race Walking Cup in 2009 and also walked at the 2009 World Championships in Athletics, where he was 30th over 50 km. He has also taken part in the IAAF World Race Walking Cup.

== Achievements ==
Year	Competition	Venue	Position	Event	Notes
Representing Ecuador
2007	Pan American Games	Rio de Janeiro, Brazil	—	50 km	DSQ
2008	World Race Walking Cup	Cheboksary, Russia	—	50 km	DNF
2009	Pan American Race Walking Cup	Balneário Camboriú, Brazil	3rd	50 km	4:08:10
2009	World Championships	Berlin, Germany	30th	50 km	4:15:28
2009	Bolivarian Games	Sucre, Bolivia	1st	50 km	4:24:07 A
2010	World Race Walking Cup	Chihuahua, Mexico	43rd	50 km	4:27:19
