= Chillanes Canton =

- Canton
- Location of Bolívar Province in Ecuador.

- Chillanes Canton in Bolívar Province
- Coordinates: 01°56′0″S 79°04′0″W
- Country: Ecuador
- Province: Bolívar Province
- Capital: Chillanes

Area
  - Total: 669.9 km^{2} (258.6 sq mi)

Population (2022 census)
  - Total: 19,802
  - Density: 29.56/km^{2} (76.56/sq mi)
- Time zone: UTC-5 (ECT)

Chillanes Canton is a canton of Ecuador, located in the Bolívar Province. Its capital is the town of Chillanes. Its population at the 2001 census was 18,685.

== Demographics ==
Ethnic groups as of the Ecuadorian census of 2010:

- Mestizo 91.9%
- Indigenous 3.8%
- White 2.2%
- Afro-Ecuadorian 1.3%
- Montubio 0.7%
- Other 0.1%
