= Athletics at the 2007 Pan American Games – Men's 50 kilometres walk =

Men's 50 kilometres walk at the Pan American Games

The Men's 50 km Race Walking event at the 2007 Pan American Games took place on July 28, 2007 in the Parque do Flamengo in Rio de Janeiro. Ecuador's Xavier Moreno captured the title, defeating the two Mexicans Horacio Nava and Omar Zepeda.

== Medalists ==
Gold	Xavier Moreno; Ecuador
Silver	Horacio Nava; Mexico
Bronze	Omar Zepeda; Mexico

== Records ==
World Record	Nathan Deakes (AUS)	3:35:47	December 2, 2006	Geelong, Australia
Pan Am Record	Carlos Mercenario (MEX)	3:47:55	March 24, 1995	Mar del Plata, Argentina

== Results ==
Rank	Athlete	Time
Gold medal	Xavier Moreno (ECU)	3:52:07
Silver medal	Horacio Nava (MEX)	3:52:35
Bronze medal	Omar Zepeda (MEX)	3:56:04
4	Salvador Mira (ESA)	3:59:51
5	Luis Fernando García (GUA)	4:01:36
6	Fredy Hernández (COL)	4:03:10
7	Cláudio dos Santos (BRA)	4:14:38
8	Philip Dunn (USA)	4:15:47
9	Cristian Muñoz (CHI)	4:24:21
—	Ricardo Reyes (ESA)	DNF
—	Kevin Eastler (USA)	DSQ
—	Mário dos Santos (BRA)	DSQ
—	Mesias Zapata (ECU)	DSQ

== See also ==
- 2007 World Championships in Athletics – Men's 50 kilometres walk
- Athletics at the 2008 Summer Olympics – Men's 50 kilometre walk
