= António Loja =

Portuguese politician (1933/1934–2024)

António Loja (1933 or 1934 – 11 December 2024) was a Portuguese politician and teacher who served in both the National Assembly and the Legislative Assembly of Madeira. Loja died on 11 December 2024, at the age of 90.
