= Horacio Nava =

Mexican race walker

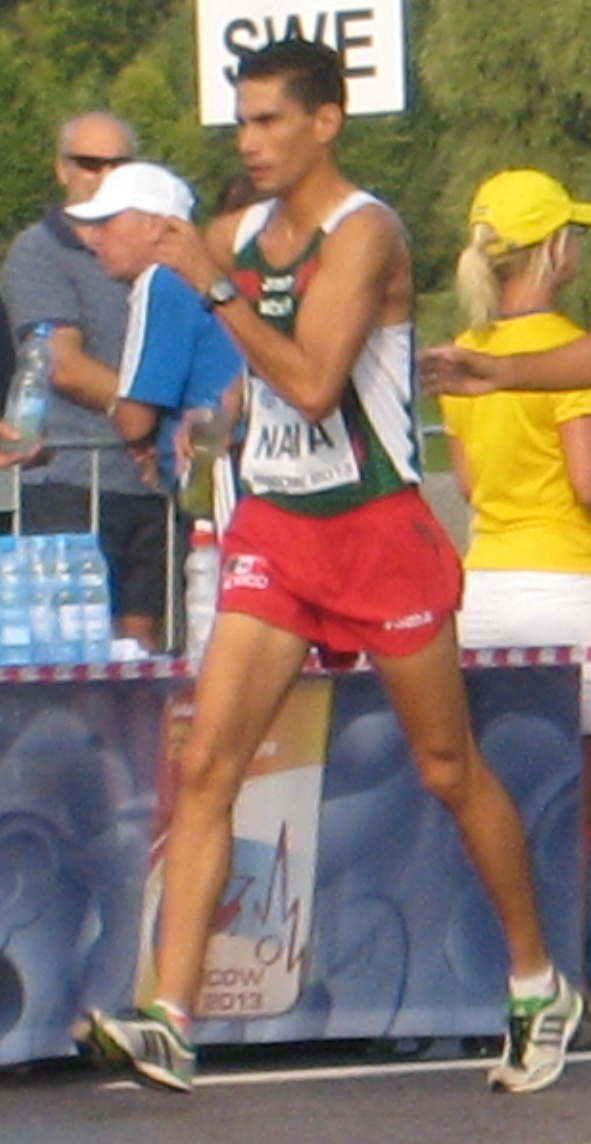
- Nava in 2013

Personal information
- Full name: Horacio Nava Meza
- Born: 20 January 1982 (age 44) Chihuahua, Mexico
- Height: 1.80 m (5 ft 11 in)
- Weight: 64 kg (141 lb)

Sport
- Country: Mexico
- Sport: Race walking
- Event: 50 km race walk
Medal record
Men's athletics
Representing Mexico
Pan American Games
Gold medal – first place	2011 Guadalajara	50 km walk
Silver medal – second place	2007 Rio de Janeiro	50 km walk
Silver medal – second place	2019 Lima	50 km walk
Bronze medal – third place	2015 Toronto	50 km walk
- Updated on 17 May 2015

Horacio Nava Meza (born January 20, 1982) is a Mexican race walker. He represented Mexico at the 2008 Summer Olympics and 2012 Summer Olympics is a five-time participant at the World Championships in Athletics (2005 to 2013). He was the runner-up over 50 km at the 2007 Pan American Games and the 2010 IAAF World Race Walking Cup. He won gold medals over that distance at the 2010 CAC Games and the 2011 Pan American Games.

He was third over 20 km at the 2012 IAAF World Race Walking Challenge meet held in his native Chihuahua.

He has qualified to represent Mexico at the 2020 Summer Olympics.

== Personal bests ==
Event	Result	Venue	Date
Road walk
20 km	1:22:04 hrs	Rio Maior, Portugal	14 April 2012
50 km	3:42:51 hrs	Cheboksary, Russia	7 June 2014
Track walk
10,000 m	40:33.52 min	Monterrey, Mexico	4 July 2004
20,000 m	1:25:24.13 hrs A	Zapopan, Mexico	23 June 2013

== Achievements ==
Year	Competition	Venue	Position	Event	Notes
Representing Mexico
1999	World Youth Championships	Bydgoszcz, Poland	5th	10,000 m track walk	44:41.89
2001	Pan American Junior Championships	Santa Fe, Argentina	1st	10,000 m track walk	43:33.92
2003	Pan American Race Walking Cup	Tijuana, Mexico	–	50 km	DNF
2003	Universiade	Daegu, South Korea	8th	20 km	1:26:24
2004	NACAC Under-23 Championships	Sherbrooke, Canada	1st	20,000 m walk	1:33:29
2005	Pan American Race Walking Cup	Lima, Peru	2nd	50 km	3:59:26 A
2005	Pan American Race Walking Cup	Lima, Peru	1st	Team (50 km)	6 pts
2005	World Championships	Helsinki, Finland	9th	50 km	3:53:57
2006	World Race Walking Cup	A Coruña, Spain	7th	50 km	3:48:22
2007	Pan American Games	Rio de Janeiro, Brazil	2nd	50 km	3:52.35
2007	World Championships	Osaka, Japan	9th	50 km	3:58:17
2008	World Race Walking Cup	Cheboksary, Russia	5th	50 km	3:47:55
2008	World Race Walking Cup	Cheboksary, Russia	2nd	Team (50 km)	29 pts
2008	Olympic Games	Beijing, China	6th	50 km	3:45:21
2009	World Championships	Berlin, Germany	19th	50 km	3:56:26
2010	World Race Walking Cup	Chihuahua, Mexico	2nd	50 km	3:54:16
2010	World Race Walking Cup	Chihuahua, Mexico	2nd	Team (50 km)	22 pts
2010	Central American and Caribbean Games	Mayagüez, Puerto Rico	1st	50 km	3:56:45
2011	World Championships	Daegu, South Korea	20th	20 km	1:24:15
2011	Pan American Games	Guadalajara, Mexico	1st	50 km	3:48:58
2012	World Race Walking Cup	Saransk, Russia	11th	50 km	3:51:23
2012	World Race Walking Cup	Saransk, Russia	4th	Team (50 km)	49 pts
2012	Olympic Games	London, United Kingdom	15th	50 km	3:46:59
2013	Pan American Race Walking Cup	Guatemala City, Guatemala	2nd	50 km	3:58:00 A
2013	Pan American Race Walking Cup	Guatemala City, Guatemala	1st	Team (50 km)	12 pts
2013	World Championships	Moscow, Russia	32nd	50 km	3:58:09
2014	Central American and Caribbean Games	Xalapa, Mexico	1st	20 km	1:25:05 A
2015	Pan American Race Walking Cup	Arica, Chile	1st	50 km	3:45:41
2015	Pan American Race Walking Cup	Arica, Chile	1st	Team (50 km)	7 pts
2015	World Championships	Beijing, China	28th	20 km walk	1:24:40
