= Chillanes =

- Location within Ecuador
- Coordinates: 01°56′0″S 79°04′0″W
- Country: Ecuador
- Province: Bolívar Province
- Canton: Chillanes Canton

Government
  - Mayor: Rolando Colina Colina

Area
  - Total: 1.38 km^{2} (0.53 sq mi)

Population (2022 census)
  - Total: 3,251
  - Density: 2,360/km^{2} (6,100/sq mi)
- Time zone: ECT
- Climate: Cwb
- Website: gobiernodebolivar.gov / Chillanes

Chillanes is a location in the Bolívar Province, Ecuador. It is the seat of the Chillanes Canton.
