= David Hurtado =

Ecuadorian racewalker (born 1999)

Personal information
- Full name: Alexander David Hurtado Espinosa
- Born: 21 April 1999 (age 27) Quito, Ecuador

Sport
- Sport: Athletics
- Event: Race walking
Medal record
Representing Ecuador
Men's athletics
World Team Championships
Gold medal – first place	2022 Muscat	20 km walk (team)
Silver medal – second place	2026 Brasília	Marathon walk
Pan American Games
Gold medal – first place	2023 Santiago	20 km walk
Pan American Cup
Bronze medal – third place	2021 Guayaquil	20 km walk
South American Games
Silver medal – second place	2022 Asunción	20 km walk
Silver medal – second place	2026 Santa Fe	Half marathon walk
South American Championships
Silver medal – second place	2019 Lima	20,000 m walk
World U20 Championships
Silver medal – second place	2018 Tampere	10,000 m walk
Junior Pan American Games
Gold medal – first place	2021 Cali-Valle	20,000 m walk
Pan American U20 Championships
Gold medal – first place	2017 Trujillo	10,000 m walk

Alexander David Hurtado Espinosa (Note: In this Spanish name, the first or paternal surname is Hurtado and the second or maternal family name is Espinosa.) (born 21 April 1999) is an Ecuadorian racewalking athlete. He represented Ecuador at the 2020 Summer Olympics in the men's 20 kilometres walk.

== Early life ==
Hurtado began racewalking at age 12 at school in Pichincha, Ecuador when his teacher introduced him to the sport. He was also inspired after watching Ecuadorian Olympic medal-winning racewalker Jefferson Pérez at the 2008 Summer Olympics.

== Career ==
At the 2017 Ecuadorian Race Walking Championships, Hurtado set the South American under-20 and under-23 record for the 10 kilometres race walk with a time of 39:41.

Hurtado represented Ecuador at the 2018 IAAF World U20 Championships in the 10,000 metres walk and won a silver medal. He finished six thousandths of a second behind gold medal winner Yao Zhang.

Hurtado represented Ecuador at the 2019 South American Championships in the 20,000 meters walk and won a silver medal.

He represented Ecuador at the 2020 Summer Olympics in the men's 20 kilometres walk and finished in 19th place.
