= Maritza Poncio =

Guatemalan racewalker

Maritza Rafaela Poncio
Personal information
- Full name: Maritza Rafaela Poncio Tzul
- Born: 3 December 1994 (age 31)

Sport
- Country: Guatemala
- Sport: Track and field
- Updated on 29 August 2015

Maritza Rafaela Poncio Tzul (born 3 December 1994) is a female racewalker from Guatemala. She competed in the Women's 20 kilometres walk event at the 2015 World Championships in Athletics in Beijing, China.

== See also ==
- Guatemala at the 2015 World Championships in Athletics
