= Luis Ángel Sánchez =

Guatemalan racewalker

Personal information
- Born: 15 December 1993 (age 32) Guatemala City, Guatemala

Sport
- Country: Guatemala
- Sport: Track and field
- Event: racewalking
- Updated on 29 August 2015

Luis Ángel Sánchez (born 15 December 1993) is a male Guatemalan racewalker. He competed in the 50 kilometres walk event at the 2015 World Championships in Athletics in Beijing, China, finishing the 36th.

He has qualified to represent Guatemala at the 2020 Summer Olympics.

== See also ==
- Guatemala at the 2015 World Championships in Athletics
