= Mauricio Arteaga =

Ecuadorian race walker (born 1988)

Personal information
- Full name: Mauricio José Arteaga Sánchez
- Nationality: Ecuador
- Born: 8 August 1988 (age 37) Cuenca, Azuay, Ecuador
- Height: 1.78 m (5 ft 10 in)
- Weight: 62 kg (137 lb)

Sport
- Sport: Athletics
- Event: Race walking
- Updated on 6 May 2014

Mauricio José Arteaga (born 8 August 1988) is an Ecuadorian race walker.

== Career ==
He competed in the 20 km walk at the 2012 Summer Olympics, where he placed 44th. He was disqualified at the 2016 Summer Olympics.

In 2019, he competed in the men's 20 kilometres walk at the 2019 World Athletics Championships held in Doha, Qatar. He did not finish his race.

== Personal bests ==
=== Track walk ===
- 10,000 m: 42:24.5 min (ht) – Quito, Ecuador, 16 May 2009
- 20,000 m: 1:23:19.3 hrs (ht) – Santiago, Chile, 15 March 2014

=== Road walk ===
- 10 km: 40:36 min – Rome, Italy, 7 May 2016
- 20 km: 1:21:08 hrs – Rome, Italy, 7 May 2016

== Achievements ==
| Year | Competition | Venue | Position | Event | Notes |
Representing Ecuador
| 2004 | South American Race Walking Championships (U-18) | Los Ángeles, Chile | 2nd | 10 km | 46:46 min |
| 2004 | South American Youth Championships | Guayaquil, Ecuador | 2nd | 10,000m track walk | 47:48.58 min |
| 2005 | Pan American Race Walking Cup | Lima, Peru | 6th | 10 km | 44:12.17 min A |
| 2005 | Pan American Race Walking Cup | Lima, Peru | 1st | Team (10 km Junior) | 7 pts |
| 2005 | World Youth Championships | Marrakesh, Morocco | 8th | 10,000m track walk | 46:11.35 min |
| 2005 | South American Junior Championships | Rosario, Argentina | 5th | 10,000m track walk | 43:12 min |
| 2006 | South American Race Walking Championships (U-20) | Cochabamba, Bolivia | 3rd | 10 km | 46:20 min |
| 2006 | South American Race Walking Championships (U-20) | Cochabamba, Bolivia | 1st | Team (10 km Junior) | 9 pts |
| 2006 | World Race Walking Cup (U20) | A Coruña, Spain | 5th | 10 km | 42:42 min |
| 2006 | World Race Walking Cup (U20) | A Coruña, Spain | 5th | Team (10 km Junior) | 36 pts |
| 2006 | World Junior Championships | Beijing, China | 17th | 10,000m track walk | 46:13.65 min |
| 2007 | Pan American Race Walking Cup (U-20) | Balneário Camboriú, Brazil | 1st | 10 km | 43:49 min |
| 2007 | Pan American Race Walking Cup (U-20) | Balneário Camboriú, Brazil | 1st | Team (10 km Junior) | 6 pts |
| 2007 | Pan American Junior Championships | São Paulo, Brazil | 1st | 10,000m track walk | 43:30.64 min |
| 2008 | South American Race Walking Championships | Cuenca, Ecuador | 5th | 20 km | 1:29:16 hrs A |
| 2008 | South American Race Walking Championships | Cuenca, Ecuador | 2nd | Team (20 km) | 16 pts |
| 2008 | World Race Walking Cup | Cheboksary, Russia | 47th | 20 km | 1:25:13 hrs |
| 2008 | World Race Walking Cup | Cheboksary, Russia | 10th | Team (20 km) | 98 pts |
| 2008 | Ibero-American Championships | Iquique, Chile | 11th | 20,000m track walk | 1:30:01.83 hrs |
| 2008 | South American Under-23 Championships | Lima, Peru | 2nd | 20,000m track walk | 1:26:59.0 hrs A |
| 2009 | World Championships | Berlin, Germany | 44th | 20 km | 1:32:25 hrs |
| 2010 | South American Under-23 Championships South American Games | Medellín, Colombia | 1st | 20,000m track walk | 1:30:12.1 hrs A |
| 2010 | World Race Walking Cup | Chihuahua, Mexico | 41st | 20 km | 1:30:11 hrs A |
| 2010 | World Race Walking Cup | Chihuahua, Mexico | 10th | Team (20 km) | 130 pts |
| 2011 | Pan American Race Walking Cup | Envigado, Colombia | 8th | 20 km | 1:29:14 hrs |
| 2011 | Pan American Race Walking Cup | Envigado, Colombia | 3rd | Team (20 km) | 41 pts |
| 2011 | South American Championships | Buenos Aires, Argentina | 7th | 20,000m track walk | 1:23:46.5 hrs |
| 2011 | ALBA Games | Barquisimeto, Venezuela | 2nd | 20,000m track walk | 1:32:31.38 hrs |
| 2011 | World Championships | Daegu, South Korea | – | 20 km | DNF |
| 2012 | World Race Walking Cup | Saransk, Russia | 60th | 20 km | 1:27:19 hrs |
| 2012 | World Race Walking Cup | Saransk, Russia | 16th | Team (20 km) | 189 pts |
| 2012 | Olympic Games | London, United Kingdom | 44th | 20 km | 1:25:51 hrs |
| 2013 | Pan American Race Walking Cup | Guatemala City, Guatemala | 5th | 20 km | 1:26:13 hrs A |
| 2013 | Pan American Race Walking Cup | Guatemala City, Guatemala | 3rd | Team (20 km) | 52 pts |
| 2013 | Universiade | Kazan, Russia | 12th | 20 km | 1:25:59 |
| 2013 | World Championships | Moscow, Russia | 35th | 20 km | 1:27:35 |
| 2013 | Bolivarian Games | Trujillo, Peru | 5th | 20 km | 1:26:13 |
| 2014 | South American Race Walking Championships | Cochabamba, Bolivia | 4th | 20 km | 1:27:52 |
| 2014 | South American Games | Santiago, Chile | 3rd | 20,000m track walk | 1:23:19.3 |
| 2014 | World Race Walking Cup | Taicang, China | 25th | 20 km | 1:21:46 |
| 2015 | Pan American Race Walking Cup | Arica, Chile | 9th | 20 km | 1:24:05 |
| 2015 | Pan American Race Walking Cup | Arica, Chile | 4th | Team (20 km) | 42 pts |
| 2015 | South American Championships | Lima, Peru | 3rd | 20,000 m walk | 1:24:18.00 |
| 2015 | World Championships | Beijing, China | 37th | 20 km walk | 1:25:50 |
| 2017 | South American Championships | Asunción, Paraguay | 1st | 20,000 m walk | 1:24:40.0 |
| 2017 | World Championships | London, United Kingdom | 28th | 20 km walk | 1:22:28 |
| 2017 | Bolivarian Games | Santa Marta, Colombia | 2nd | 20 km walk | 1:27:03 |
| 2018 | Ibero-American Championships | Trujillo, Peru | 1st | 20,000 m walk | 1:22:18.16 |
