= José Ortiz (race walker) =

Guatemalan racewalker

Personal information
- Full name: José Eduardo Ortiz Flores
- Born: 8 March 2000 (age 26) Guatemala City, Guatemala

Sport
- Sport: Athletics
- Event: Racewalking
Medal record
Men's athletics
Representing Guatemala
NACAC Championships
| Silver medal – second place | 2025 Freeport | 20,000 m walk |
World Junior Championships
| Bronze medal – third place | 2018 Tampere | 10,000m walk |

José Eduardo Ortiz Flores (born 8 March 2000) is a Guatemalan racewalking athlete. He qualified to represent Guatemala at the 2020 Summer Olympics in Tokyo 2021, competing in men's 20 kilometres walk.

== International Competitions ==
| Year | Competition | Venue | Position | Event | Notes |
|---|---|---|---|---|---|
| 2018 | IAAF World Race Walking Team Championships | Taicang, China | 3rd | 10 km | 40:17 |
| 2018 | IAAF World U20 Championships | Tampere, Finland | 3rd | 10000 m walk | 40:45.26 |
| 2021 | Olympic Games | Tokyio, Japan | 40 | 20 km walk | 1:28.57 |
