= José María Raymundo =

Guatemalan racewalker

Personal information
- Full name: José María Raymundo Cox
- Born: 1 September 1993 (age 32)
- Height: 1.65 m (5 ft 5 in)
- Weight: 58 kg (128 lb)

Sport
- Country: Guatemala
- Sport: Track and field
- Event: racewalking
- Updated on 29 August 2015

José María Raymundo Cox (born 1 September 1993) is a male Guatemalan racewalker. He competed in the 20 kilometres walk event at the 2015 World Championships in Athletics in Beijing, China. In 2019, he competed in the men's 20 kilometres walk at the 2019 World Athletics Championships held in Doha, Qatar. He did not finish his race.

== See also ==
- Guatemala at the 2015 World Championships in Athletics
