= José Alejandro Barrondo =

Guatemalan racewalker

Personal information
- Born: 16 September 1996 (age 29) San Cristóbal Verapaz, Guatemala

Sport
- Sport: Race walking
Medal record
Representing Guatemala
Pan American Games
Bronze medal – third place	2019 Lima	20 km walk

José Alejandro Barrondo Xuc (born 16 September 1996) is a Guatemalan race walker, he has qualified to represent Guatemala at the 2020 Summer Olympics. He is from San Cristóbal Verapaz.

== International Competitions ==
Year	Competition	Venue	Position	Event	Notes
Representing Guatemala
2013	World Youth Championships	Donetsk, Ukraine	DQ	10000m race walk	
2017	World Championships	London, United Kingdom	40	20 km race walk	
2018	World Race Walking Team Championships	Taicang, China	DQ	20 km race walk	
