= Athletics at the Pan American Games =

- No. of events: 48 (men: 24; women: 24)

Since its first edition held in 1951, athletics events have been competed at the Pan American Games. The events list follows the Olympic model as the Games are an IOC sanctioned competition.

== Events ==
=== Men ===
| Event | 51 | 55 | 59 | 63 | 67 | 71 | 75 | 79 | 83 | 87 | 91 | 95 | 99 | 03 | 07 | 11 | 15 | 19 | 23 | Years |
|---|---|---|---|---|---|---|---|---|---|---|---|---|---|---|---|---|---|---|---|---|
Current program
| 100 metres | X | X | X | X | X | X | X | X | X | X | X | X | X | X | X | X | X | X | X | 19 |
| 200 metres | X | X | X | X | X | X | X | X | X | X | X | X | X | X | X | X | X | X | X | 19 |
| 400 metres | X | X | X | X | X | X | X | X | X | X | X | X | X | X | X | X | X | X | X | 19 |
| 800 metres | X | X | X | X | X | X | X | X | X | X | X | X | X | X | X | X | X | X | X | 19 |
| 1500 metres | X | X | X | X | X | X | X | X | X | X | X | X | X | X | X | X | X | X | X | 19 |
| 5000 metres | X | X | X | X | X | X | X | X | X | X | X | X | X | X | X | X | X | X | X | 19 |
| 10,000 metres | X | X | X | X | X | X | X | X | X | X | X | X | X | X | X | X | X | X | X | 19 |
| Marathon | X | X | X | X | X | X | X | X | X | X | X | X | X | X | X | X | X | X | X | 19 |
| 110 metres hurdles | X | X | X | X | X | X | X | X | X | X | X | X | X | X | X | X | X | X | X | 19 |
| 400 metres hurdles | X | X | X | X | X | X | X | X | X | X | X | X | X | X | X | X | X | X | X | 19 |
| 3000 metres steeplechase | X | X | X | X | X | X | X | X | X | X | X | X | X | X | X | X | X | X | X | 19 |
| 4 × 100 metres relay | X | X | X | X | X | X | X | X | X | X | X | X | X | X | X | X | X | X | X | 19 |
| 4 × 400 metres relay | X | X | X | X | X | X | X | X | X | X | X | X | X | X | X | X | X | X | X | 19 |
| 20 kilometres race walk | | | | X | X | X | X | X | X | X | X | X | X | X | X | X | X | X | X | 16 |
| High jump | X | X | X | X | X | X | X | X | X | X | X | X | X | X | X | X | X | X | X | 19 |
| Pole vault | X | X | X | X | X | X | X | X | X | X | X | X | X | X | X | X | X | X | X | 19 |
| Long jump | X | X | X | X | X | X | X | X | X | X | X | X | X | X | X | X | X | X | X | 19 |
| Triple jump | X | X | X | X | X | X | X | X | X | X | X | X | X | X | X | X | X | X | X | 19 |
| Shot put | X | X | X | X | X | X | X | X | X | X | X | X | X | X | X | X | X | X | X | 19 |
| Discus throw | X | X | X | X | X | X | X | X | X | X | X | X | X | X | X | X | X | X | X | 19 |
| Hammer throw | X | X | X | X | X | X | X | X | X | X | X | X | X | X | X | X | X | X | X | 19 |
| Javelin throw | X | X | X | X | X | X | X | X | X | X | X | X | X | X | X | X | X | X | X | 19 |
| Decathlon | X | X | X | X | X | X | X | X | X | X | X | X | X | X | X | X | X | X | X | 19 |
Past events
| 10 km walk | X | | | | | | | | | | | | | | | | | | | 1 |
| 50 km walk | X | | | | X | X | | X | X | X | X | X | X | X | X | X | X | X | | 14 |
| Events | 24 | 22 | 22 | 23 | 24 | 24 | 23 | 24 | 24 | 24 | 24 | 24 | 24 | 24 | 24 | 24 | 24 | 24 | 23 | 451 |

=== Women ===
| Event | 51 | 55 | 59 | 63 | 67 | 71 | 75 | 79 | 83 | 87 | 91 | 95 | 99 | 03 | 07 | 11 | 15 | 19 | 23 | Years |
|---|---|---|---|---|---|---|---|---|---|---|---|---|---|---|---|---|---|---|---|---|
Current program
| 100 metres | X | X | X | X | X | X | X | X | X | X | X | X | X | X | X | X | X | X | X | 19 |
| 200 metres | X | | X | X | X | X | X | X | X | X | X | X | X | X | X | X | X | X | X | 18 |
| 400 metres | | | | | | X | X | X | X | X | X | X | X | X | X | X | X | X | X | 14 |
| 800 metres | | | | X | X | X | X | X | X | X | X | X | X | X | X | X | X | X | X | 16 |
| 1500 metres | | | | | | | X | X | X | X | X | X | X | X | X | X | X | X | X | 13 |
| 5000 metres | | | | | | | | | | | | X | X | X | X | X | X | X | X | 8 |
| 10,000 metres | | | | | | | | | | X | X | X | X | X | X | X | X | X | X | 10 |
| Marathon | | | | | | | | | | X | X | X | X | X | X | X | X | X | X | 10 |
| 100 metres hurdles | | | | | | X | X | X | X | X | X | X | X | X | X | X | X | X | X | 14 |
| 400 metres hurdles | | | | | | | | | X | X | X | X | X | X | X | X | X | X | X | 11 |
| 3000 metres steeplechase | | | | | | | | | | | | | | | X | X | X | X | X | 5 |
| 4 × 100 metres relay | X | X | X | X | X | X | X | X | X | X | X | X | X | X | X | X | X | X | X | 19 |
| 4 × 400 metres relay | | | | | | X | X | X | X | X | X | X | X | X | X | X | X | X | X | 14 |
| 20 kilometres race walk | | | | | | | | | | | | | X | X | X | X | X | X | X | 7 |
| High jump | X | X | X | X | X | X | X | X | X | X | X | X | X | X | X | X | X | X | X | 19 |
| Pole vault | | | | | | | | | | | | | X | X | X | X | X | X | X | 7 |
| Long jump | X | | X | X | X | X | X | X | X | X | X | X | X | X | X | X | X | X | X | 18 |
| Triple jump | | | | | | | | | | | | X | X | X | X | X | X | X | X | 8 |
| Shot put | X | | X | X | X | X | X | X | X | X | X | X | X | X | X | X | X | X | X | 18 |
| Discus throw | X | X | X | X | X | X | X | X | X | X | X | X | X | X | X | X | X | X | X | 19 |
| Hammer throw | | | | | | | | | | | | X | X | X | X | X | X | X | X | 8 |
| Javelin throw | X | X | X | X | X | X | X | X | X | X | X | X | X | X | X | X | X | X | X | 19 |
| Heptathlon | | | | | | | | | X | X | X | X | X | X | X | X | X | X | X | 11 |
Past events
| 80 metres hurdles | X | X | X | X | X | | | | | | | | | | | | | | | 5 |
| 3000 metres | | | | | | | | X | X | X | X | | | | | | | | | 4 |
| 10 km walk | | | | | | | | | | X | X | X | | | | | | | | 3 |
| 50 km walk | | | | | | | | | | | | | | | | | | X | | 1 |
| Pentathlon | | | | | X | X | X | X | | | | | | | | | | | | 4 |
| Events | 9 | 6 | 9 | 10 | 11 | 13 | 14 | 15 | 16 | 19 | 19 | 21 | 22 | 22 | 23 | 23 | 23 | 24 | 23 | 322 |

=== Mixed ===
| Event | 51 | 55 | 59 | 63 | 67 | 71 | 75 | 79 | 83 | 87 | 91 | 95 | 99 | 03 | 07 | 11 | 15 | 19 | 23 | Years |
|---|---|---|---|---|---|---|---|---|---|---|---|---|---|---|---|---|---|---|---|---|
Current program
| 4 × 400 metres relay | | | | | | | | | | | | | | | | | | | X | 1 |
| Race walk mixed team | | | | | | | | | | | | | | | | | | | X | 1 |

== Medal table ==
Updated after the 2023 Pan American Games.

| Rank | Nation | Gold | Silver | Bronze | Total |
|---|---|---|---|---|---|
| 1 | United States | 307 | 263 | 194 | 764 |
| 2 | Cuba | 144 | 128 | 114 | 386 |
| 3 | Brazil | 71 | 66 | 74 | 211 |
| 4 | Canada | 59 | 74 | 90 | 223 |
| 5 | Mexico | 54 | 53 | 40 | 147 |
| 6 | Jamaica | 29 | 33 | 41 | 103 |
| 7 | Argentina | 18 | 20 | 30 | 68 |
| 8 | Chile | 16 | 14 | 21 | 51 |
| 9 | Colombia | 14 | 20 | 35 | 69 |
| 10 | Ecuador | 12 | 10 | 5 | 27 |
| 11 | Venezuela | 8 | 13 | 13 | 34 |
| 12 | Peru | 7 | 5 | 9 | 21 |
| 13 | Bahamas | 6 | 15 | 13 | 34 |
| 14 | Dominican Republic | 6 | 6 | 12 | 24 |
| 15 | Trinidad and Tobago | 3 | 13 | 14 | 30 |
| 16 | Guatemala | 3 | 5 | 8 | 16 |
| 17 | Costa Rica | 3 | 1 | 1 | 5 |
| 18 | British West Indies | 2 | 3 | 5 | 10 |
| 19 | Panama | 2 | 3 | 4 | 9 |
| 20 | Saint Lucia | 2 | 0 | 3 | 5 |
| 21 | Puerto Rico | 1 | 8 | 11 | 20 |
| 22 | Guyana | 1 | 4 | 4 | 9 |
| 23 | Grenada | 1 | 3 | 2 | 6 |
| 24 | Barbados | 1 | 2 | 8 | 11 |
| 25 | Antigua and Barbuda | 1 | 2 | 4 | 7 |
| 26 | Suriname | 1 | 1 | 2 | 4 |
| 27 | Netherlands Antilles | 1 | 0 | 1 | 2 |
| 28 | British Virgin Islands | 1 | 0 | 0 | 1 |
| 28 | El Salvador | 1 | 0 | 0 | 1 |
| 30 | Uruguay | 0 | 3 | 7 | 10 |
| 31 | Dominica | 0 | 2 | 2 | 4 |
| 31 | Saint Kitts and Nevis | 0 | 2 | 2 | 4 |
| 33 | Cayman Islands | 0 | 2 | 0 | 2 |
| 34 | Paraguay | 0 | 1 | 0 | 1 |
| 35 | Saint Vincent and the Grenadines | 0 | 0 | 2 | 2 |
| 35 | Virgin Islands | 0 | 0 | 2 | 2 |
| 37 | Independent Athletes Team | 0 | 0 | 1 | 1 |
| Totals (37 entries) | | 775 | 775 | 774 | 2,324 |

== See also ==
- International athletics championships and games
- List of Pan American Games records in athletics
- List of Pan American Games medalists in athletics (men)
- List of Pan American Games medalists in athletics (women)
