= Athletics at the 1971 Pan American Games – Men's 50 kilometres walk =

Men's 50 kilometres walk at the Pan American Games

The men's 50 kilometres walk event at the 1971 Pan American Games was held in Cali on 3 August.

== Results ==
Rank	Name	Nationality	Time	Notes
1st place, gold medalist(s)	Larry Young	United States	4:38:36	
2nd place, silver medalist(s)	Gabriel Hernández	Mexico	4:38:46	
3rd place, bronze medalist(s)	John Kniften	United States	4:42:15	
4	Rafael Vega	Colombia	4:58:00	
5	Adalberto Scorza	Argentina	5:07:29	
6	Marcel Jobin	Canada	5:14:33	
7	Lucas Lara	Cuba	5:28:30	
8	Eladio Campos	Mexico	5:28:31	
9	Carlos Vanegas	Nicaragua	5:40:15	
	Felix Cappella	Canada	DNF	
