= Athletics at the 1971 Pan American Games – Men's 20 kilometres walk =

Men's 20 kilometres walk at the Pan American Games

The men's 20 kilometres walk event at the 1971 Pan American Games was held in Cali on 1 August.

== Results ==
| Rank | Name | Nationality | Time | Notes |
|---|---|---|---|---|
| 1st place, gold medalist(s) | Goetz Klopfer | United States | 1:37:30 | |
| 2nd place, silver medalist(s) | Tom Dooley | United States | 1:38:16 | |
| 3rd place, bronze medalist(s) | José Oliveros | Mexico | 1:40:26 | |
| 4 | Marcel Jobin | Canada | 1:43:18 | |
| 5 | Miguel Sánchez | Mexico | 1:43:43 | |
| 6 | Adalberto Scorza | Argentina | 1:47:30 | |
| 7 | Ángel Estrada | Colombia | 1:47:42 | |
| 8 | Carlos Vanegas | Nicaragua | 1:53:01 | |
| 9 | Frank Johnson | Canada | 2:02:54 | |
| | Lucas Lara | Cuba | DQ | |
