= Athletics at the 1979 Pan American Games – Men's 20 kilometres walk =

Men's 20 kilometres walk at the 1979 Pan American Games
- Venue: Estadio Sixto Escobar
- Dates: 13 July
- Winning time: 1:28:15

Medalists
Gold medal	Daniel Bautista	Mexico
Silver medal	Neal Pyke	United States
Bronze medal	Todd Scully	United States

The men's 20 kilometres walk competition of the athletics events at the 1979 Pan American Games took place at the Estadio Sixto Escobar. The defending Pan American Games champion was Daniel Bautista of Mexico.

== Records ==
Prior to this competition, the existing world and Pan American Games records were as follows:

World record	Reima Salonen (FIN)	1:21:01	Raisio, Finland	June 6, 1979
Pan American Games record	Ron Laird (USA)	1:33:05	Winnipeg, Canada	1967

== Results ==
KEY:	WR	World Record	GR	Pan American Record

Rank	Name	Nation	Time	Notes
1st place, gold medalist(s)	Daniel Bautista	Mexico	1:28:15	GR
2nd place, silver medalist(s)	Neal Pyke	United States	1:30:17	
3rd place, bronze medalist(s)	Clark Scully	United States	1:32:30	
4	Santiago Fonseca	Honduras	1:35:20	
5	Marcel Jobin	Canada	1:38:42	
6	Domingo Colín	Mexico	1:40:02	
7	Ernesto Alfaro	Colombia	1:41:30	
8	Alexis López	Costa Rica	1:41:33	
9	Luis Mendez	Honduras	1:43:43	
10	Helmut Bueck	Canada	1:44:55	
11	Wilmer Santiago	Puerto Rico	1:47:58	
12	Jorge Quiñonez	Colombia	1:50:43	
13	Lino Medina	Cuba	1:54:48	
	Glen Sweazey	Canada	DNS	
	Edgar López	Costa Rica	DNS	
	Reinaldo Luces	Venezuela	DNS	
