= Athletics at the 1979 Pan American Games – Men's 50 kilometres walk =

Men's 50 kilometres walk at the 1979 Pan American Games
- Venue: Estadio Sixto Escobar
- Dates: 8 July
- Winning time: 4:05:17

Medalists
Gold medal	Raúl González	Mexico
Silver medal	Martín Bermúdez	Mexico
Bronze medal	Marco Evoniuk	United States

The men's 50 kilometres walk competition of the athletics events at the 1979 Pan American Games took place at the Estadio Sixto Escobar.

== Records ==
Prior to this competition, the existing world and Pan American Games records were as follows:

World record	Raúl González (MEX)	3:41:20	Poděbrady, Czechoslovakia	June 11, 1978
Pan American Games record	Larry Young (USA)	4:26:20.8	Winnipeg, Canada	1967

== Results ==
KEY:	WR	World Record	GR	Pan American Record

Rank	Name	Nation	Time	Notes
1st place, gold medalist(s)	Raúl González	Mexico	4:05:17	GR
2nd place, silver medalist(s)	Martín Bermúdez	Mexico	4:11:13	
3rd place, bronze medalist(s)	Marco Evoniuk	United States	4:24:23	
4	Ernesto Alfaro	Colombia	4:39:36	
5	Vince O'Sullivan	United States	4:44:20	
6	Nicolás Soto	Puerto Rico	4:51:40	
7	Henry Klein	Virgin Islands	5:17:01	
	Marcel Jobin	Canada	DNS	
