= Athletics at the 1967 Pan American Games – Men's 20 kilometres walk =

Men's 20 kilometres walk at the Pan American Games

The men's 20 kilometres walk event at the 1967 Pan American Games was held in Winnipeg on 30 July.

== Results ==
Rank	Name	Nationality	Time	Notes
1st place, gold medalist(s)	Ron Laird	United States	1:33:06	
2nd place, silver medalist(s)	José Pedraza	Mexico	1:34:51	
3rd place, bronze medalist(s)	Felix Cappella	Canada	1:35:45	
4	Tom Dooley	United States	1:36:50	
5	Yvon Groulx	Canada	1:39:19	
6	Euclides Calzado	Cuba	1:45:09	
7	Eladio Campos	Mexico	1:49:27	
	Juan López	Cuba	DQ	
