= Athletics at the 1979 Pan American Games – Women's shot put =

Women's shot put at the 1979 Pan American Games
- Venue: Estadio Sixto Escobar
- Dates: 9 July
- Winning distance: 18.81

Medalists
Gold medal	María Elena Sarría	Cuba
Silver medal	Maren Seidler	United States
Bronze medal	Carmen Ionesco	Canada

The women's shot put competition of the athletics events at the 1979 Pan American Games took place on 9 July at the Estadio Sixto Escobar. The defending Pan American Games champion was María Elena Sarría of Cuba.

== Records ==
Prior to this competition, the existing world and Pan American Games records were as follows:

World record	Helena Fibingerová (TCH)	22.32	Nitra, Czechoslovakia	August 20, 1977
Pan American Games record	María Elena Sarría (CUB)	18.03	Mexico City, Mexico	1975

== Results ==
All distances shown are in meters.

KEY:	WR	World Record	GR	Pan American Record

=== Final ===
Rank	Name	Nationality	Distance	Notes
1st place, gold medalist(s)	María Elena Sarría	Cuba	18.81	GR
2nd place, silver medalist(s)	Maren Seidler	United States	18.57	
3rd place, bronze medalist(s)	Carmen Ionesco	Canada	16.50	
4	Ann Turbyne	United States	16.45	
5	Hilda Ramírez	Cuba	15.96	
6	Lucette Moreau	Canada	14.90	
7	María Victoria López	Puerto Rico	12.36	
	Patricia Andrus	Venezuela	DNS	
