= Dan Bertoia =

Canadian middle-distance runner (born 1969)

Personal information
- Born: Daniel Bertoia; April 16, 1969 (age 57)

Sport
- Sport: Athletics
- Event: Middle-distance running
Medal record
Representing Canada
Pan American Games
Bronze medal – third place	1991 Havana	1500 metres

Daniel Bertoia (born April 16, 1969) is a Canadian former athlete who competed in middle-distance running.

Bertoia is the son of 1963 Pan American Games 800 m champion and 1964 Olympian Don Bertoia, who began coaching him in grade eight. He earned NAIA All-American honours while attending Simon Fraser University and set a long-standing Clan record in the 1,500 m of 3:41.5.

Trained at the Kelowna Track and Field Club, Bertoia specialised in 800 m and 1,500 m races. He became Canada's first athletics medalist at the 1991 Pan American Games in Havana, when he claimed a bronze medal in the 1,500 m, having led the race in the final lap until being passed by José Valente and Bill Burke. His time of 3:43.71 was 11 seconds faster than his father's bronze medal-winning run in the same event at the 1963 Pan American Games.

Bertoia was inducted into the Central Okanagan Sports Hall of Fame in 2011.
