= Athletics at the 1975 Pan American Games – Men's 20 kilometres walk =

Men's 20 kilometres walk at the Pan American Games

The men's 20 kilometres walk event at the 1975 Pan American Games was held in Mexico City on 16 October.

== Results ==
Rank	Name	Nationality	Time	Notes
1st place, gold medalist(s)	Daniel Bautista	Mexico	1:33:06	
2nd place, silver medalist(s)	Domingo Colín	Mexico	1:33:58	
3rd place, bronze medalist(s)	Larry Young	United States	1:37:53	
4	Rafael Vega	Colombia	1:40:18	
5	Todd Scully	United States	1:41:17	
6	Santiago Fonseca	Honduras	1:44:11	
7	Marcel Jobin	Canada	1:45:41	
8	Ernesto Alfaro	Colombia	1:50:32	
9	José Esteban Valle	Nicaragua	1:50:53	
10	Adalberto Scorza	Argentina	1:52:10	
11	Juan Solórzano	Nicaragua	1:59:50	
