= Athletics at the 1967 Pan American Games – Men's 50 kilometres walk =

Men's 50 kilometres walk at the Pan American Games

The men's 50 kilometres walk event at the 1967 Pan American Games was held in Winnipeg on 4 August. It was the first time since the inaugural 1951 edition that this event was featured at the Games.

== Results ==
Rank	Name	Nationality	Time	Notes
1st place, gold medalist(s)	Larry Young	United States	4:26:21	
2nd place, silver medalist(s)	Felix Cappella	Canada	4:36:00	
3rd place, bronze medalist(s)	Goetz Klopfer	United States	4:38:00	
4	Karl-Heinz Merschenz	Canada	4:54:12	
5	Pablo Colín	Mexico	5:15:07	
	José Pedraza	Mexico	DNF	
	David Jiménez	Cuba	DNF	
