= Munyasia =

Munyasia is a surname. Notable people with the surname include:

- David Munyasia (born 1980), Kenyan boxer
- Pius Munyasia (born 1960), Kenyan racewalker
