= Athletics at the 1999 Pan American Games – Women's 20 kilometres walk =

Women's 20 kilometres walk at the Pan American Games

The women's 20 kilometres walk event at the 1999 Pan American Games was held on July 26.

== Results ==
Rank	Name	Nationality	Time	Notes
1st place, gold medalist(s)	Graciela Mendoza	Mexico	1:34:19	
2nd place, silver medalist(s)	Rosario Sánchez	Mexico	1:34:46	
3rd place, bronze medalist(s)	Michelle Rohl	United States	1:35:22	
4	Geovana Irusta	Bolivia	1:35:56	
5	Joanne Dow	United States	1:36:33	
6	Ivis Martínez	El Salvador	1:37:28	
7	Teresita Collado	Guatemala	1:38:41	
8	Oslaidis Cruz	Cuba	1:39:23	
9	Janice McCaffrey	Canada	1:47:05	
	Miriam Ramón	Ecuador	DNS	
