= Bertoia =

Bertoia is the name of

- Don Bertoia (born 1940), Canadian middle-distance runner
- Harry Bertoia (1915–1978), Italian-born American artist, sound art sculptor, and modern furniture designer
- Jacopo Bertoia (1544 – c. 1574), Italian painter
- Reno Bertoia (1935–2011), Italian-born professional baseball player
