= Athletics at the 1979 Pan American Games – Men's shot put =

Men's shot put at the 1979 Pan American Games
- Venue: Estadio Sixto Escobar
- Dates: 7 July
- Winning distance: 20.22

Medalists
Gold medal	Dave Laut	United States
Silver medal	Bishop Dolegiewicz	Canada
Bronze medal	Bruno Pauletto	Canada

The men's shot put competition of the athletics events at the 1979 Pan American Games took place at the Estadio Sixto Escobar. The defending Pan American Games champion was Bruce Pirnie of Canada.

== Records ==
Prior to this competition, the existing world and Pan American Games records were as follows:

World record	Udo Beyer (GDR)	22.15	Gothenburg, Sweden	July 6, 1978
Pan American Games record	Randy Matson (USA)	19.83	Winnipeg, Canada	1967

== Results ==
All distances shown are in meters.

KEY:	WR	World Record	GR	Pan American Record

=== Final ===
Rank	Name	Nationality	Distance	Notes
1st place, gold medalist(s)	Dave Laut	United States	20.22	GR
2nd place, silver medalist(s)	Bishop Dolegiewicz	Canada	19.67	
3rd place, bronze medalist(s)	Bruno Pauletto	Canada	19.61	
4	Al Feuerbach	United States	18.86	
5	Luis Delís	Cuba	18.21	
6	Nicolás Hernández	Cuba	16.37	
7	Radai Mendoza	Puerto Rico	16.17	
8	Bradley Cooper	Bahamas	15.37	
9	Pedro Serrano	Puerto Rico	15.30	
10	Gert Weil	Chile	15.06	
	José Carreño	Venezuela	DNS	
	Jesús Ramos	Venezuela	DNS	
