= Athletics at the 1984 Summer Olympics – Men's 20 kilometres walk =

Men's 20 kilometres walk at the Games of the XXIII Olympiad
- Venue: Los Angeles Memorial Coliseum
- Date: August 3
- Competitors: 38 from 21 nations
- Winning time: 1:23:13 OR

Medalists
1st place, gold medalist(s)		Ernesto Canto; Mexico
2nd place, silver medalist(s)		Raúl González; Mexico
3rd place, bronze medalist(s)		Maurizio Damilano; Italy

The Men's 20 km Race Walk at the 1984 Summer Olympics in Los Angeles, California had an entry list of 42 competitors. Four athletes did not start in the final, held on August 3, 1984.

== Records ==
Standing records prior to the 1984 Summer Olympics
World Record	Jozef Pribilinec (TCH)	1:19:30	September 23, 1983	Bergen, Norway
Olympic Record	Maurizio Damilano (ITA)	1:23:35.5	July 24, 1980	Moscow, Soviet Union
Broken records during the 1984 Summer Olympics
Olympic Record	Ernesto Canto (MEX)	1:23:13	August 3, 1984	Los Angeles, United States

== Results ==
Rank	Athlete	Nation	Time	Time behind	Notes
1st place, gold medalist(s)	Ernesto Canto	Mexico	1:23:13		OR
2nd place, silver medalist(s)	Raúl González	Mexico	1:23:20		
3rd place, bronze medalist(s)	Maurizio Damilano	Italy	1:23:26		
4	Guillaume LeBlanc	Canada	1:24:29		
5	Carlo Mattioli	Italy	1:25:07		
6	Josep Marín	Spain	1:25:32		
7	Marco Evoniuk	United States	1:25:42		
8	Erling Andersen	Norway	1:25:54		
9	Querubín Moreno	Colombia	1:26:04		
10	David Smith	Australia	1:26:48		
11	François Lapointe	Canada	1:27:06		
12	Héctor Moreno	Colombia	1:27:12		
13	Philip Vesty	Great Britain	1:27:28		
14	Simon Baker	Australia	1:27:43		
15	Gérard Lelièvre	France	1:27:50		
16	Willi Sawall	Australia	1:28:24		
17	Marcelino Colín	Mexico	1:28:26		
18	Francisco Vargas	Colombia	1:28:46		
19	Ian McCombie	Great Britain	1:28:53		
20	Martial Fesselier	France	1:29:46		
21	Marcel Jobin	Canada	1:29:49		
22	Chand Ram	India	1:30:06		
23	Jim Heiring	United States	1:30:20		
24	Steve Barry	Great Britain	1:30:46		
25	José Pinto	Portugal	1:30:54		
26	Abdelouahab Ferguene	Algeria	1:31:24		
27	Zhang Fuxin	China	1:32:10		
28	Alessandro Pezzatini	Italy	1:32:27		
29	Martin Toporek	Austria	1:33:58		
30	Benamar Kechkouche	Algeria	1:34:12		
31	Santiago Folseca	Honduras	1:34:47		
32	Pius Munyasia	Kenya	1:34:53		
33	Daniel O'Connor	United States	1:35:12		
34	José Víctor Alonzo	Guatemala	1:35:32		
35	Stefano Casali	San Marino	1:35:48		
36	Oswaldo Morejón	Bolivia	1:44:42		
37	Luis Campos	El Salvador	1:48:45		
38	Amjad Tawalbeh	Jordan	1:49:35		
—	Reima Salonen	Finland	DNS		
—	Dominique Guebey	France	DNS		
—	Dieter Hoffmann	West Germany	DNS		
—	Lars Ove Moen	Norway	DNS		

== See also ==
- 1982 Men's European Championships 20 km Walk (Athens)
- 1983 Men's World Championships 20 km Walk (Helsinki)
- 1984 Men's Friendship Games 20 km Walk (Moscow)
- 1986 Men's European Championships 20 km Walk (Stuttgart)
- 1987 Men's World Championships 20 km Walk (Rome)
