= Amjad Tawalbeh =

Jordanian racewalker

Personal information
- Native name: أمجد طوالبه
- Nationality: Jordanian
- Born: 3 January 1965 (age 61)
- Height: 186 cm (6 ft 1 in)
- Weight: 72 kg (159 lb)

Sport
- Sport: Athletics
- Event: Racewalking

Achievements and titles
- Personal best: 20kW: 1:42:57 (1984)

Amjad Tawalbeh (Arabic: امجد طوالبة ,أمجد طوالبه; born 3 January 1965 or 1955) is a Jordanian racewalker. He competed in the men's 20 kilometres walk at the 1984 Summer Olympics.

Tawalbeh was the only racewalker to take part in Jordan's second Olympic appearance. He placed 38th in a time of 1:49:35, over six minutes behind his personal best of 1:42:57 set that year. He finished three minutes behind Luis Campos of El Salvador, and by the time they reached the Los Angeles Memorial Coliseum track facility to complete the race, the men's 10,000 metres heats had already started.

The following year, Tawalbeh finished in 4th place in the 20 km walk at the 1985 Arab Games, just behind bronze medallist Hassan Kouchaoui of Morocco.
