= Athletics at the 1979 Pan American Games – Men's discus throw =

Men's discus throw at the 1979 Pan American Games
- Venue: Estadio Sixto Escobar
- Dates: 11 July
- Winning distance: 63.30

Medalists
Gold medal	Mac Wilkins	United States
Silver medal	Bradley Cooper	Bahamas
Bronze medal	Luis Delís	Cuba

The men's discus throw competition of the athletics events at the 1979 Pan American Games took place at the Estadio Sixto Escobar. The defending Pan American Games champion was John Powell of the United States.

== Records ==
Prior to this competition, the existing world and Pan American Games records were as follows:

World record	Wolfgang Schmidt (GDR)	71.16	Berlin, Germany	August 9, 1978
Pan American Games record	John Powell (USA)	62.36	Mexico City, Mexico	1975

== Results ==
All distances shown are in meters.

KEY:	WR	World Record	GR	Pan American Record

=== Final ===
Rank	Name	Nationality	Distance	Notes
1st place, gold medalist(s)	Mac Wilkins	United States	63.30	GR
2nd place, silver medalist(s)	Bradley Cooper	Bahamas	62.16	
3rd place, bronze medalist(s)	Luis Delís	Cuba	61.60	
4	Juan Martínez Brito	Cuba	60.80	
5	Boris Chambul	Canada	59.42	
6	Robert Gray	Canada	54.30	
7	Gert Weil	Chile	43.24	
	Pedro Serrano	Puerto Rico	DNS	
	Ken Stadel	United States	DNS	
	Luis Palacios	Venezuela	DNS	
