= Luis Campos (race walker) =

Salvadoran racewalker (born 1962)

Personal information
- Nationality: Salvadoran
- Born: 21 July 1962 (age 63)

Sport
- Sport: Athletics
- Event: Racewalking

Luis Campos (born 21 July 1962) is a Salvadoran racewalker. He competed in the men's 20 kilometres walk at the 1984 Summer Olympics.

Due to the Salvadoran Civil War, Campos could not focus on training for the 20 km walk and did not perform to expectations at the 1984 Olympics. Despite this, he was described as "No. 1 in your heart" and given a standing ovation by fans while walking about a lap behind Ernesto Canto by the fifth loop of the course. He did not enter the Los Angeles Memorial Coliseum to complete the race until about 25 minutes after the leaders, by which time the heats of the men's 10,000 metres had already begun. Nonetheless, the crowd reportedly roared for his final appearance and Campos cried as he finished the race in 37th place.

In the 2020s, Campos began competing in masters athletics in the United States. He finished 5th at the 2022 USATF Masters Indoor Championships in the 3000 m race walk. Competing for the Shore Athletic Club, he finished 17th at the 2023 USATF National 5K Race Walk Championships. He also won the 2023 Ronald Zinn 5K Racewalk.
