= Athletics at the 1987 Pan American Games – Men's 50 kilometres walk =

Men's 50 kilometres walk at the Pan American Games

The men's 50 kilometres walk event at the 1987 Pan American Games was held in Indianapolis, United States on 15 August.

== Results ==
| Rank | Name | Nationality | Time | Notes |
|---|---|---|---|---|
| 1st place, gold medalist(s) | Martín Bermúdez | Mexico | 3:58.54 | GR |
| 2nd place, silver medalist(s) | Raúl González | Mexico | 4:07.27 | |
| 3rd place, bronze medalist(s) | Héctor Moreno | Colombia | 4:18.48 | |
| 4 | Nelson Funes | Guatemala | 4:49.53 | |
| | Querubín Moreno | Colombia | DNF | |
| | José Víctor Alonzo | Guatemala | DNF | |
| | Randy Mimm | United States | DQ | |
| | Dan O'Conner | United States | DQ | |
