= Athletics at the 1971 Pan American Games – Men's marathon =

Men's marathon at the Pan American Games

The men's marathon event at the 1971 Pan American Games was held in Cali on 5 August.

== Results ==
Rank	Name	Nationality	Time	Notes
1st place, gold medalist(s)	Frank Shorter	United States	2:22:40	GR
2nd place, silver medalist(s)	José García	Mexico	2:26:30	
3rd place, bronze medalist(s)	Hernán Barreneche	Colombia	2:27:19	
4	Álvaro Mejía	Colombia	2:27:59	
5	Carlos Cuque López	Guatemala	2:33:14	
6	Ron Wallingford	Canada	2:35:23	
7	Manuel Chuco	Cuba	2:38:33	
8	Juan Fernando Molina	Argentina	2:45:37	
9	José Ramírez	Chile	2:50:05	
10	Ramkarran Changuer	Guyana	3:19:22	
11	Carlos Vanegas	Nicaragua	3:20:18	
	Kenny Moore	United States	DNF	
