= Jaime Correa (athlete) =

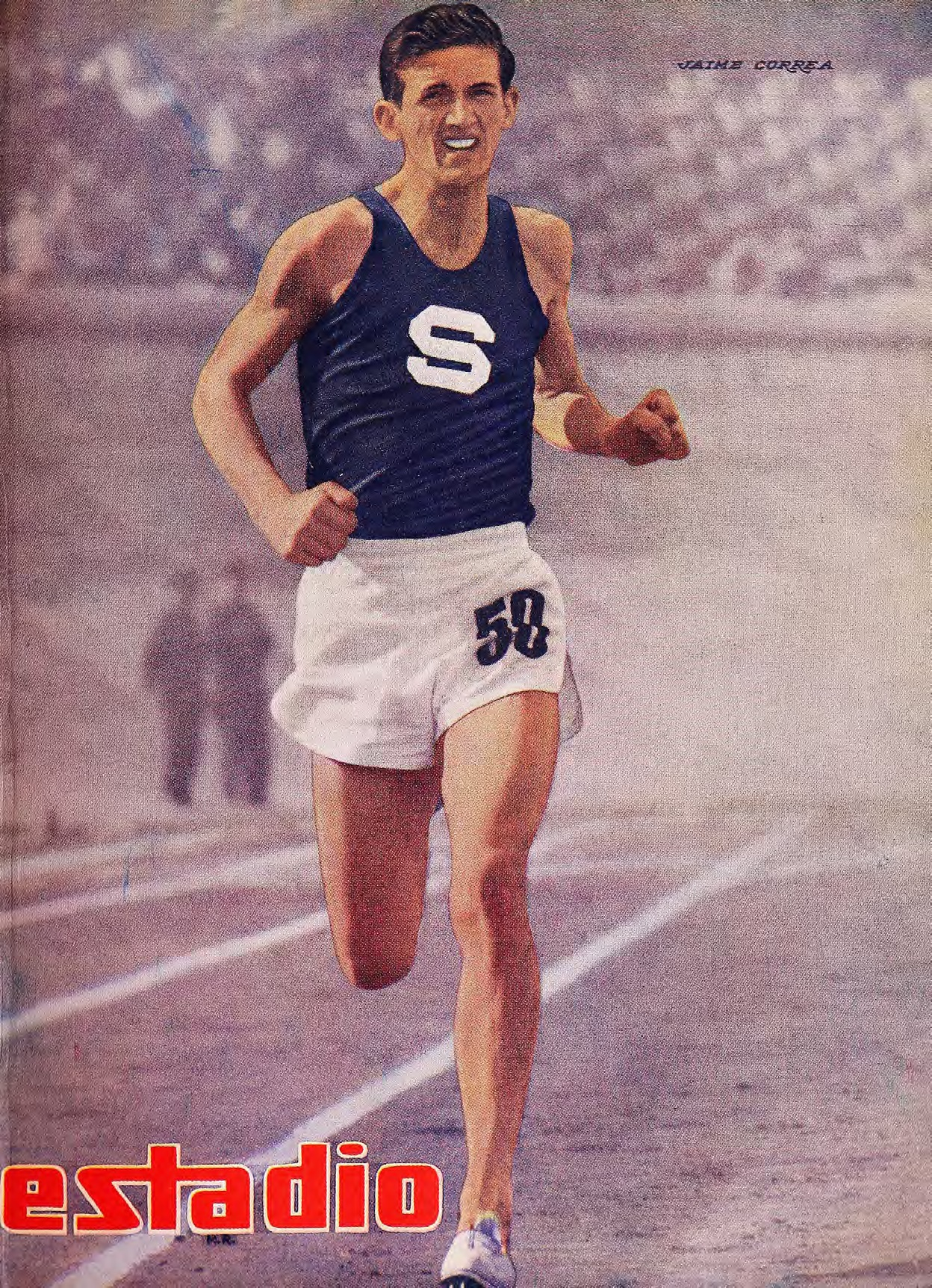
- Jaime Correa in 1954

Personal information
- Born: 1933

Sport
- Sport: Athletics
- Event(s): 1500 m, 5000 m, 10,000 m

Jaime Correa (born 1933) is a retired Chilean runner who competed in distanced from 1500 to 10,000 metres. He won multiple medals for his country including three at the 1954 South American Championships and two at the 1955 Pan American Games.

== International competitions ==
Year	Competition	Venue	Position	Event	Notes
Representing Chile
1954	South American Championships	São Paulo, Brazil	1st	1500 m	3:56.5
1954	South American Championships	São Paulo, Brazil	1st	5000 m	15:00.6
1954	South American Championships	São Paulo, Brazil	1st	10,000 m	31:41.0
1955	Pan American Games	Mexico City, Mexico	3rd	5000 m	15:39.2
1955	Pan American Games	Mexico City, Mexico	3rd	10,000 m	33:42.6
1956	South American Championships	Santiago, Chile	–	10,000 m	14:47.8
1956	South American Championships	Santiago, Chile	2nd	5000 m	DNF
1957	South American Championships (unofficial)	Santiago, Chile	2nd	5000 m	14:53.4
1957	South American Championships (unofficial)	Santiago, Chile	4th	10,000 m	32:05.8
1958	South American Championships	Montevideo, Uruguay	4th	5000 m	15:02.0
1958	South American Championships	Montevideo, Uruguay	5th	10,000 m	31:30.8

== Personal bests ==
- 5000 metres – 14:42.2 (Chile 1955)
