= Athletics at the 1959 Pan American Games – Women's 200 metres =

Women's 200 metres at the Pan American Games

The women's 200 metres event at the 1959 Pan American Games was held at the Soldier Field in Chicago on 31 August and 1 September.

== Medalists ==
Gold	Silver	Bronze
Lucinda Williams; United States	Isabelle Daniels; United States	Sally McCallum; Canada

== Results ==
=== Heats ===
Held on 31 August

Wind:
Heat 1: ? m/s, Heat 2: +2.7 m/s

Rank	Heat	Name	Nationality	Time	Notes
1	1	Lucinda Williams	United States	24.1	Q
2	1	Heather Campbell	Canada	26.4	Q
3	1	Patricia Cole	Canada	26.6	Q
	1	Teresa Kuniyoshi	Peru	DNS	
	1	Vilma Parris	British Guiana	DNS	
1	2	Isabelle Daniels	United States	24.7	Q
2	2	Sally McCallum	Canada	25.5	Q
3	2	Louise Mead	United States	26.2	Q
4	2	Myra Fawcett	British Guiana	26.3	
	2	Yolanda Vincourt	Mexico	DNS	

=== Final ===
Wind: +0.9 m/s

Rank	Name	Nationality	Time	Notes
1st place, gold medalist(s)	Lucinda Williams	United States	24.2	
2nd place, silver medalist(s)	Isabelle Daniels	United States	24.8	
3rd place, bronze medalist(s)	Sally McCallum	Canada	25.1	
4	Heather Campbell	Canada	25.5	
5	Louise Mead	United States	26.2	
6	Patricia Cole	Canada	26.4	
