= Athletics at the 1963 Pan American Games – Men's 1500 metres =

Men's 1500 metres at the Pan American Games

The men's 1500 metres event at the 1963 Pan American Games was held at the Pacaembu Stadium in São Paulo on 4 May.

== Results ==
Rank	Name	Nationality	Time	Notes
1st place, gold medalist(s)	Jim Grelle	United States	3:43.62	
2nd place, silver medalist(s)	Jim Beatty	United States	3:43.88	
3rd place, bronze medalist(s)	Don Bertoia	Canada	3:55.19	
4	José dos Santos Primo	Brazil	3:56.69	
5	Alejandro Arroyo	Ecuador	4:00.37	
6	Albertino Etchechury	Uruguay	4:02.18	
7	Jeffrey Payne	Bermuda	4:14.42	
8	José Manuel Luna	Mexico	4:16.21	
	Caspar Springer	Barbados	DNS	
	Luis Alarcón	Chile	DNS	
	Lloyd Bacchus	British Guiana	DNS	
	Carver King	Trinidad and Tobago	DNS	
	Jocelem dos Santos	Brazil	DNS	
	Mario Zambrano	Ecuador	DNS	
