= 2003 World Championships in Athletics – Women's 20 kilometres walk =

The official results of the Women's 20 km Walk at the 2003 World Championships in Paris, France, held on 24 August 2003.

== Medalists ==
Gold	Yelena Nikolayeva; Russia (RUS)
Silver	(Republic of Ireland) Gillian O'Sullivan; Ireland (IRL)
Bronze	Valentina Tsybulskaya; Belarus (BLR)

== Abbreviations ==
- All times shown are in hours:minutes:seconds

DNS	did not start
DSQ	disqualified
NM	no mark
WR	world record
WL	world leading
AR	area record
NR	national record
PB	personal best
SB	season best

=== Records ===
Standing records prior to the 2003 World Athletics Championships
World Record	Olimpiada Ivanova (RUS)	1:24:50	March 4, 2001	Adler, Russia
Event Record	Olimpiada Ivanova (RUS)	1:27:48	August 9, 2001	Edmonton, Canada
Broken records during the 2003 World Athletics Championships
Event Record	Yelena Nikolayeva (RUS)	1:26:52	August 24, 2003	Paris, France

== Final ranking ==
Rank	Athlete	Time	Note
1st place, gold medalist(s)	Yelena Nikolayeva (RUS)	1:26:52	CR
2nd place, silver medalist(s)	Gillian O'Sullivan (IRL)	1:27:34	
3rd place, bronze medalist(s)	Valentina Tsybulskaya (BLR)	1:28:10	NR
4	Tatyana Gudkova (RUS)	1:28:53	
5	Claudia Ștef (ROU)	1:29:09	PB
6	Rossella Giordano (ITA)	1:29:14	SB
7	Athanasia Tsoumeleka (GRE)	1:29:34	NR
8	Melanie Seeger (GER)	1:29:44	NR
9	Susana Feitor (POR)	1:30:15	
10	Elisa Rigaudo (ITA)	1:30:34	SB
11	Jane Saville (AUS)	1:30:51	SB
12	Olive Loughnane (IRL)	1:30:53	
13	Xu Aihui (CHN)	1:31:34	
14	Kristina Saltanovič (LTU)	1:32:13	
15	Vera Santos (POR)	1:32:43	PB
16	Sonata Milušauskaitė (LTU)	1:32:58	
17	Vira Zozulya (UKR)	1:33:34	
18	Geovana Irusta (BOL)	1:33:42	AR
19	Fatiha Ouali (FRA)	1:34:01	
20	Sabine Zimmer (GER)	1:34:08	
21	Barbora Dibelková (CZE)	1:34:44	
22	Svetlana Tolstaya (KAZ)	1:35:11	
23	Daniela Cârlan (ROU)	1:36:02	
24	Joanne Dow (USA)	1:36:32	
25	Ryoko Sakakura (JPN)	1:38:00	
26	Gabrielle Gorst (NZL)	1:38:51	
27	Monica Svensson (SWE)	1:39:21	
28	Teresita Collado (GUA)	1:41:19	
DISQUALIFIED (DSQ)
—	Song Hongjuan (CHN)	DSQ	
—	Natalya Fedoskina (RUS)	DSQ	
—	Mi-Jung Kim (KOR)	DSQ	
—	Gao Kelian (CHN)	DSQ	
—	Yuan Yufang (MAS)	DSQ	
—	Kjersti Plätzer (NOR)	DSQ	
—	Olga Kardopoltseva (BLR)	DSQ	
—	Mari Cruz Díaz (ESP)	DSQ	
—	Norica Câmpean (ROU)	DSQ	
DID NOT FINISH (DNF)
—	Rosario Sánchez (MEX)	DNF	
—	Elisabetta Perrone (ITA)	DNF	
—	Olimpiada Ivanova (RUS)	DNF	
—	María Vasco (ESP)	DNF	
—	Maria Teresa Gargallo (ESP)	DNF	

== See also ==
- Athletics at the 2003 Pan American Games - Women's 20 kilometres walk
- 2003 Race Walking Year Ranking
