= Xu Aihui =

Chinese racewalker (born 1978)

Xu Aihui (Chinese: 徐爱辉; born 25 April 1978 in Heilongjiang) is a Chinese race walker.

She finished thirteenth at the 2003 World Championships and eleventh at the 2004 World Race Walking Cup, the latter in a personal best time of 1:29:30 hours.

== Achievements ==
Year	Competition	Venue	Position	Event	Notes
Representing China
2003	World Championships	Paris, France	13th	20 km	1:31:34
