= Caridad Agüero =

Cuban athlete (born 1938)

Personal information
- Full name: Caridad Agüero Acosta
- Born: 26 February 1938 (age 88)

Sport
- Sport: Athletics
- Event: Discus throw

Caridad Agüero Acosta (born 26 February 1938) is a retired Cuban athlete who specialised in the discus throw. She won several international medals at regional level.

== International competitions ==
Year	Competition	Venue	Position	Event	Notes
Representing Cuba
1962	Central American and Caribbean Games	Kingston, Jamaica	1st	Discus throw	43.75 m
1962	Ibero-American Games	Madrid, Spain	2nd	Discus throw	44.27 m
1963	Pan American Games	São Paulo, Brazil	4th	Discus throw	45.02 m
1966	Central American and Caribbean Games	San Juan, Puerto Rico	1st	Discus throw	43.37 m
1967	Central American and Caribbean Championships	Xalapa, Mexico	1st	Discus throw	45.86 m
1967	Pan American Games	Winnipeg, Canada	3rd	Discus throw	46.68 m
