= Athletics at the 1991 Pan American Games – Men's 800 metres =

Men's 800 metres at the Pan American Games

The men's 800 metres event at the 1991 Pan American Games was held in Havana, Cuba on 7 and 8 August.

== Medalists ==
Gold	Silver	Bronze
Ocky Clark; United States	Terril Davis; United States	Tommy Asinga; Suriname

== Results ==
=== Heats ===
Rank	Heat	Name	Nationality	Time	Notes
1	2	Tommy Asinga	Suriname	1:47.61	Q
2	2	Terril Davis	United States	1:47.77	Q
3	3	Héctor Herrera	Cuba	1:48.06	Q
4	2	Ángel Carnesolta	Cuba	1:48.07	q
5	1	Ocky Clark	United States	1:48.09	Q
6	3	Pablo Squella	Chile	1:48.13	Q
7	3	Luis Migueles	Argentina	1:48.20	q
8	1	Luis José Gonçalves	Brazil	1:48.21	Q
9	1	Dale Jones	Antigua and Barbuda	1:48.77	
10	2	William Best	Canada	1:49.19	
11	1	Daniel Bertoia	Canada	1:49.54	
12	1	Desmond Hector	Guyana	1:50.03	
13	1	Michael Williams	Barbados	1:50.70	
14	3	Michael Watson	Bermuda	1:53.06	
15	2	Steven Roberts	Barbados	1:54.09	
16	2	Roger Miranda	Nicaragua	1:54.84	
17	3	Raúl Lobatón	Bolivia	1:55.10	
18	3	Juan Navarro	Venezuela	1:56.59	
	3	José Valente	Brazil	DNS	

=== Final ===
Rank	Name	Nationality	Time	Notes
1st place, gold medalist(s)	Ocky Clark	United States	1:46.91	
2nd place, silver medalist(s)	Terril Davis	United States	1:46.99	
3rd place, bronze medalist(s)	Tommy Asinga	Suriname	1:47.24	
4	Pablo Squella	Chile	1:47.59	
5	Ángel Carnesolta	Cuba	1:47.93	
6	Héctor Herrera	Cuba	1:48.12	
7	Luis José Gonçalves	Brazil	1:48.82	
8	Luis Migueles	Argentina	1:48.86	
