= Lawrence Hart =

Lawrence Hart may refer to:

- Lawrence Hart (American football), American football tight end
- Lawrence Hart (athlete), American hammer thrower
- Lawrence Hart (poet) (1901–1996), American poet of the "Activist Group"
- Lawrence Hart, see Metropolitan Council (Nashville)

== See also ==
- Larry Hart (disambiguation)
