= Athletics at the 1983 Pan American Games – Men's 50 kilometres walk =

Men's 50 kilometres walk at the Pan American Games

The men's 50 kilometres walk event at the 1983 Pan American Games was held in Caracas, Venezuela on 27 August.

== Results ==
Rank	Name	Nationality	Time	Notes
1st place, gold medalist(s)	Raúl González	Mexico	4:00:45	
2nd place, silver medalist(s)	Martín Bermúdez	Mexico	4:04:21	
3rd place, bronze medalist(s)	Querubín Moreno	Colombia	4:23:20	
4	Tom Edwards	United States	4:30:53	
5	Enrique Peña	Colombia	4:51:28	
6	Nelson Funes	Guatemala	4:59:08	
	David Castro	Cuba	DQ	
	Marcel Jobin	Canada	DQ	
	Sam Shick	United States	DNF	
	Carlos Ramones	Venezuela	DNF	
	Omar Castillo	Venezuela	DNF	
	François Lapointe	Canada	DNF	
	José Víctor Alonzo	Guatemala	DNF	
