= Armando Orozco =

Cuban hammer thrower

Guillermo Armando Orozco Valera (born 31 January 1958) is a Cuban former hammer thrower who competed in the 1980 Summer Olympics.

His personal best in the event is 74.74 metres.

== International competitions ==
Year	Competition	Venue	Position	Event	Notes
Representing Cuba
1974	Central American and Caribbean Junior Championships	Maracaibo, Venezuela	2nd	Discus throw	39.76 m
1974	Central American and Caribbean Junior Championships	Maracaibo, Venezuela	1st	Hammer throw	62.84 m
1978	Central American and Caribbean Games	Medellín, Colombia	1st	Hammer throw	69.86 m
1979	Pan American Games	San Juan, Puerto Rico	2nd	Hammer throw	68.48 m
1979	World Cup	Montreal, Canada	5th	Hammer throw	69.62 m^{1}
1980	Olympic Games	Moscow, Soviet Union	11th	Hammer throw	68.68 m

^{1}Representing the Americas
