= Maria Cipriano =

Brazilian high jumper (born 1943)

Personal information
- Born: 18 December 1943 (age 82) Rio de Janeiro, Brazil
- Height: 1.68 m (5 ft 6 in)
- Weight: 55 kg (121 lb)

Sport
- Sport: Athletics
- Event: High jump
- Club: Flamengo

Maria de Conceição Cipriano (born December 18, 1943) is a Brazilian athlete who competed in the high jump. She participated in the women's high jump at the 1968 Summer Olympics.

== International competitions ==
| Year | Competition | Venue | Position | Event | Notes |
Representing Brazil
| 1962 | Ibero-American Games | Madrid, Spain | 2nd | High jump | 1.54 m |
| 1963 | Pan American Games | São Paulo, Brazil | 4th | High jump | 1.59 m |
| 1963 | South American Championships | Cali, Colombia | 1st | High jump | 1.58 m |
| 1965 | South American Championships | Rio de Janeiro, Brazil | 1st | High jump | 1.69 m |
| 1967 | Pan American Games | Winnipeg, Canada | 4th | High jump | 1.66 m |
| 1967 | South American Championships | Buenos Aires, Argentina | 5th | 100 m | 12.4 s |
| 1967 | South American Championships | Buenos Aires, Argentina | 1st | 4 × 100 m relay | 48.2 s |
| 1967 | South American Championships | Buenos Aires, Argentina | 1st | High jump | 1.66 m |
| 1968 | Olympic Games | Mexico City, Mexico | 11th | High jump | 1.71 m |
| 1969 | South American Championships | Quito, Ecuador | 1st | High jump | 1.70 m |
| 1971 | Pan American Games | Cali, Colombia | 8th | High jump | 1.60 m |
| 1971 | South American Championships | Lima, Peru | 5th | 4 × 100 m relay | 48.6 s |
| 1971 | South American Championships | Lima, Peru | 2nd | High jump | 1.65 m |

== Personal bests ==
- High jump – 1.74 (1968)
