= Hilda Ramírez =

Cuban shot putter

Personal information
- Full name: Hilda Victoria Ramírez Serrano
- Nickname: La Bambina
- Born: 6 March 1944 Alto Songo, Cuba

Sport
- Sport: Athletics
- Event: Shot put

Hilda Victoria Ramírez Serrano (born 6 March 1944) is a retired Cuban athlete who competed primarily in the shot put. She won multiple medals at regional level.

Her personal best in the event is 17.28 metres set in Mexico City in 1975.

== International competitions ==
Year	Competition	Venue	Position	Event	Notes
Representing Cuba
1962	Central American and Caribbean Games	Kingston, Jamaica	5th	Discus throw	36.98 m
1962	Central American and Caribbean Games	Kingston, Jamaica	1st	Javelin throw	40.32 m
1962	Ibero-American Games	Madrid, Spain	8th	Shot put	10.62 m
1962	Ibero-American Games	Madrid, Spain	8th	Discus throw	35.44 m
1962	Ibero-American Games	Madrid, Spain	4th	Javelin throw	38.97 m
1966	Central American and Caribbean Games	San Juan, Puerto Rico	1st	Shot put	12.72 m
1966	Central American and Caribbean Games	San Juan, Puerto Rico	1st	Javelin throw	39.34 m
1967	Pan American Games	Winnipeg, Canada	5th	Shot put	14.07 m
1967	Pan American Games	Winnipeg, Canada	6th	Discus throw	44.62 m
1967	Central American and Caribbean Championships	Xalapa, Mexico	1st	Shot put	13.59 m
1967	Central American and Caribbean Championships	Xalapa, Mexico	2nd	Discus throw	42.65 m
1969	Central American and Caribbean Championships	Havana, Cuba	1st	Shot put	14.02 m
1970	Central American and Caribbean Games	Panama City, Panama	2nd	Shot put	13.85 m
1970	Central American and Caribbean Games	Panama City, Panama	3rd	Discus throw	44.10 m
1970	Central American and Caribbean Games	Panama City, Panama	2nd	Javelin throw	45.46 m
1973	Central American and Caribbean Championships	Maracaibo, Venezuela	1st	Shot put	14.28 m
1974	Central American and Caribbean Games	Santo Domingo, Dominican Republic	2nd	Shot put	14.40 m
1975	Pan American Games	Mexico City, Mexico	2nd	Shot put	17.28 m
1978	Central American and Caribbean Games	Medellín, Colombia	1st	Shot put	17.00 m
1979	Pan American Games	San Juan, Puerto Rico	5th	Shot put	15.96 m
