= Rosario Sánchez (race walker) =

Mexican racewalker (born 1973)

Personal information
- Born: October 26, 1973 (age 53) Mexico City, Mexico

Sport
- Sport: Track and field
Medal record
Race walking
Representing Mexico
Pan American Games
Silver medal – second place	1999 Winnipeg	20km walk
Silver medal – second place	2003 Santo Domingo	20km walk
Central American and Caribbean Games
Silver medal – second place	1998 Maracaibo	10km walk
Silver medal – second place	2002 San Salvador	20km walk
Bronze medal – third place	2010 Mayaguez	20km walk
CAC Junior Championships (U20)
Gold medal – first place	1992 Tegucigalpa	5000 m walk

María del Rosario Sánchez Guerrero (born October 26, 1973) is a Mexican track and field athlete, who competed in race walking. She represented her native country at the 2004 Summer Olympics in Athens, Greece.

== Achievements ==
Year	Competition	Venue	Position	Event	Notes
Representing Mexico
1990	World Junior Championships	Plovdiv, Bulgaria	—	5000m	DQ
1992	Central American and Caribbean Junior Championships (U-20)	Tegucigalpa, Honduras	1st	5000m	27:26.0
1993	Central American and Caribbean Games	Ponce, Puerto Rico	–	10,000 m	DQ
1995	World Championships	Gothenburg, Sweden	37th	10 km	46:54.0
1998	Ibero-American Championships	Lisbon, Portugal	3rd	10,000 m	47:36.10
1998	Central American and Caribbean Games	Maracaibo, Venezuela	2nd	10,000 m	47:12.74
1999	World Race Walking Cup	Mézidon-Canon, France	12th	20 km	1:30:52
1999	Pan American Games	Winnipeg, Canada	2nd	20 km	1:34:46
1999	World Championships	Seville, Spain	34th	20 km	1:41:04
2000	Ibero-American Championships	Rio de Janeiro, Brazil	1st	10,000 m	45:38.90 CR
2002	World Race Walking Cup	Turin, Italy	12th	20 km	1:32:47
2002	Central American and Caribbean Games	San Salvador, El Salvador	2nd	20 km	1:36:44
2003	Pan American Race Walking Cup	Chula Vista, United States	1st	20 km	1:37:14
2003	Pan American Games	Santo Domingo, Dominican Republic	2nd	20 km	1:35:21
2003	World Championships	Paris, France	—	20 km	DNF
2004	Olympic Games	Athens, Greece	—	20 km	DNF
2010	Central American and Caribbean Games	Mayagüez, Puerto Rico	3rd	20 km	1:22:30 PB
