= Larry Hart =

Larry Hart may refer to:

- Larry Hart (American football) (born 1987), formerly of Jacksonville Jaguars
- Larry Hart (athlete) (born 1946), hammer thrower
- Larry Hart (musician), Christian musician, Grammy Award winner and nominee
- Lorenz Hart (1895–1943), librettist and songwriter, also/better known as Larry Hart
- Larry Hart (politician), American politician

== See also ==
- Lawrence Hart (disambiguation)
- Hart (surname)
