= 1987 IAAF World Indoor Championships – Men's 5000 metres walk =

The men's 5000 metres walk event at the 1987 IAAF World Indoor Championships was held at the Hoosier Dome in Indianapolis on 6 March 1987.

The winning margin was 0.01 seconds which is the only time this event for men was won by less than 0.05 seconds at these championships. Since this event was discontinued after the 1993 championships, this record cannot be broken.

== Results ==
| Rank | Name | Nationality | Time | Notes |
|---|---|---|---|---|
| 1st place, gold medalist(s) | Mikhail Shchennikov | Soviet Union | 18:27.79 | WR, CR |
| 2nd place, silver medalist(s) | Jozef Pribilinec | Czechoslovakia | 18:27.80 | NR |
| 3rd place, bronze medalist(s) | Ernesto Canto | Mexico | 18:38.71 | AR |
| 4 | Roman Mrázek | Czechoslovakia | 18:47.95 | PB |
| 5 | David Smith | Australia | 18:52.20 | AR |
| 6 | Sándor Urbanik | Hungary | 19:06.19 | |
| 7 | Walter Arena | Italy | 19:08.20 | PB |
| 8 | Tim Lewis | United States | 19:18.40 | NR |
| 9 | Erling Andersen | Norway | 19:26.18 | |
| 10 | Bo Gustafsson | Norway | 19:27.43 | PB |
| 11 | Marcelino Colín | Mexico | 19:45.19 | PB |
| 12 | Zdzisław Szlapkin | Poland | 19:46.67 | |
| 13 | Carlo Mattioli | Italy | 19:59.47 | |
| 14 | Ray Sharp | United States | 20:13.19 | |
| 15 | Andrew Jachno | Australia | 20:19.74 | |
| 16 | Christos Karagiorgos | Greece | 20:26.54 | |
| 17 | Hirofumi Sakai | Japan | 21:10.01 | AR |
