= Athletics at the 1995 Pan American Games – Men's 20 kilometres walk =

Men's 20 kilometres walk at the Pan American Games

The men's 20 kilometres walk event at the 1995 Pan American Games was held in Mar del Plata on 18 March.

Held on the track (50 laps), the two Mexicans and Pérez dominated the race as the others fell off the back of the lead pack. With two laps to go, the Mexicans used a team effort to box Pérez in behind a lapped walker, losing a couple of strides. A disgusted, future Olympic gold medalist, Pérez threw down his hat and took off in chase. Pérez caught García, but it wasn't until the last 100 metres that he challenged Segura. Responding to the challenge, Segura managed to cross the finish line first. After the race was over, the chief judge located Segura to show him the red paddle for losing contact on the final straight.

== Results ==
Rank	Name	Nationality	Time	Notes
1st place, gold medalist(s)	Jefferson Pérez	Ecuador	1:22:53	GR
2nd place, silver medalist(s)	Daniel García	Mexico	1:22:56	
3rd place, bronze medalist(s)	Julio René Martínez	Guatemala	1:23:50	
4	José Querubín Moreno	Colombia	1:24:29	
5	Martin St. Pierre	Canada	1:25:28	
6	Daniel Vargas	Cuba	1:26:20	
7	Sérgio Galdino	Brazil	1:27:14	
8	Cláudio Bertolino	Brazil	1:28:10	
9	Benjamín Loréfice	Argentina	1:32:19	
	Allen James	United States	DNF	
	Jonathan Matthews	United States	DNF	
	Tim Berrett	Canada	DNF	
	Luis Quispe	Bolivia	DNF	
	Bernardo Segura	Mexico	DQ	
	Héctor Moreno	Colombia	DQ	
	Jorge Loréfice	Argentina	DQ	
