= Athletics at the 1995 Pan American Games – Men's 50 kilometres walk =

Men's 50 kilometres walk at the Pan American Games

The men's 50 kilometres walk event at the 1995 Pan American Games was held in Mar del Plata on 24 March.

== Results ==
Rank	Name	Nationality	Time	Notes
1st place, gold medalist(s)	Carlos Mercenario	Mexico	3:47:55	
2nd place, silver medalist(s)	Miguel Ángel Rodríguez	Mexico	3:48:22	
3rd place, bronze medalist(s)	Julio Urías	Guatemala	3:49:37	NR
4	Tim Berrett	Canada	3:52:04	
5	Edel Oliva	Cuba	3:52:19	NR
6	Allen James	United States	3:59:27	
7	Jorge Pino	Cuba	4:02:51	
8	Hugo López	Guatemala	4:09:56	
9	Andrzej Chylinski	United States	4:12:39	
	Oscar Ruffo	Argentina	DNF	
	Héctor Moreno	Colombia	DNF	
	Querubín Moreno	Colombia	DNF	
	Luis Quispe	Bolivia	DQ	
