= Marcelo Palma =

Brazilian race walker

Personal information
- Full name: Marcelo Moreira Palma
- Born: June 2, 1966 (age 60) São Paulo, Brazil
- Height: 1.80 m (5 ft 11 in)
- Weight: 65 kg (143 lb)

Sport
- Country: Brazil
- Sport: Athletics
- Event: Race walking
Medal record
Representing Brazil
Pan American Games
Bronze medal – third place	1991 Havana	20km walk
- Updated on 27 July 2013

Marcelo Moreira Palma (born June 2, 1966) is a Brazilian retired race walker. He is a two-time Olympian (1988 and 1992).

Currently, Marcelo Prahas is a psychologist working with clinical psychology (psychotherapy) and teaching meditation.

== Personal best ==
- 20 km - 1:21:30 – São Paulo, Brazil, June 1991 – South American Record (best performance in track at this time)
- 20 km: 1:22:23 hrs – São Paulo, Brazil, 25 March 1990

== Achievements ==
Year	Competition	Venue	Position	Event	Notes
Representing Brazil
1988	Olympic Games	Seoul, South Korea	45th	20 km	1:31:42
1990	Pan American Race Walking Cup	Xalapa, Mexico	10th	20 km	1:32:04
1991	South American Championships	Manaus, Brazil	–	20 km	DQ
1991	Pan American Games	Havana, Cuba	3rd	20 km	1:26:42
1991	World Championships	Tokyo, Japan	24th	20 km	1:24:54
1992	Ibero-American Championships	Seville, Spain	—	20 km	DQ
1992	Olympic Games	Barcelona, Spain	32nd	20 km	1:40:11
