= Roberto Carmona Botella =

Mexican decathlete

Roberto Carmona
Personal information
- Born: Roberto Carmona Botella; 20 October 1943 (age 82) Mexico City, Mexico
- Height: 186 cm (6 ft 1 in)
- Weight: 85 kg (187 lb)

Sport
- Country: Mexico
- Sport: Track and field
- Event: Decathlon
- Club: Club de Atletismo Venados

Achievements and titles
- Olympic finals: 1968 Men's decathlon
- Highest world ranking: fourth
- Personal best: 7180

Roberto Carmona Botella (born 20 October 1943) is a Mexican decathlete. He competed in the decathlon at the 1968 Summer Olympics in Mexico.

He finished fourth at the 1971 Pan American Games. His personal best in the decathlon is 7180, which he achieved in 1971.

== Personal life ==
Roberto is a member of The Church of Jesus Christ of Latter-Day Saints.

== International competitions ==
Year	Competition	Venue	Position	Event	Notes
Representing Mexico
1966	Central American and Caribbean Games	San Juan, Puerto Rico	7th	Pentathlon	3184 pts
1967	Pan American Games	Winnipeg, Canada	–	Decathlon	DNF
1968	Olympic Games	Mexico City, Mexico	–	Decathlon	DNF
1970	Central American and Caribbean Games	Panama City, Panama	10th	Decathlon	6064 pts
1971	Central American and Caribbean Championships	Kingston, Jamaica	5th	Shot put	13.50 m
1971	Pan American Games	Cali, Colombia	4th	Decathlon	6706 pts
