= Athletics at the 1991 Pan American Games – Men's 1500 metres =

Men's 1500 metres at the Pan American Games

The men's 1500 metres event at the 1991 Pan American Games was held in Havana, Cuba on 4 and 5 August.

== Results ==
=== Heats ===
Rank	Heat	Name	Nationality	Time	Notes
1	1	José Valente	Brazil	3:44.97	Q
2	1	Dan Bertoia	Canada	3:45.24	Q
3	1	Amado Ramos	Cuba	3:45.60	Q
4	1	Ignacio Fragoso	Mexico	3:45.69	Q
5	1	Keith Allen	United States	3:45.74	Q
6	1	Linton McKenzie	Jamaica	3:46.09	q
7	1	José López	Venezuela	3:47.26	q
8	2	Bill Burke	United States	3:49.08	Q
9	2	Jason Bunston	Canada	3:49.32	Q
10	2	Roilando Delís	Cuba	3:49.92	Q
11	2	Luis José Gonçalves	Brazil	3:50.08	Q
12	2	Mauricio Hernández	Mexico	3:50.36	Q
13	1	Desmond Hector	Guyana	3:54.62	
14	2	Raúl Lobatón	Bolivia	3:55.69	
15	2	Roger Miranda	Nicaragua	3:57.32	
16	2	Michael Watson	Bermuda	4:00.53	

=== Final ===
Rank	Name	Nationality	Time	Notes
1st place, gold medalist(s)	José Valente	Brazil	3:42.90	
2nd place, silver medalist(s)	Bill Burke	United States	3:43.04	
3rd place, bronze medalist(s)	Dan Bertoia	Canada	3:43.71	
4	Luis José Gonçalves	Brazil	3:44.33	
5	Amado Ramos	Cuba	3:44.84	
6	Ignacio Fragoso	Mexico	3:45.20	
7	Jason Bunston	Canada	3:47.02	
8	Linton McKenzie	Jamaica	3:47.25	
9	Roilando Delís	Cuba	3:49.61	
10	Mauricio Hernández	Mexico	3:49.92	
11	Keith Allen	United States	4:00.99	
	José López	Venezuela	DNF	
