= Querubín Moreno =

Colombian race walker (born 1959)

Personal information
- Full name: José Querubín Moreno Moreno
- Born: December 29, 1959 (age 66) Ventaquemada, Boyacá
- Height: 1.62 m (5 ft 4 in)
- Weight: 54 kg (119 lb)

Sport
- Country: Colombia
- Sport: Athletics
- Event: Racewalking

Achievements and titles
- Olympic finals: 1984 Summer Olympics; 1988 Summer Olympics
Medal record
Men's Racewalking
Representing Colombia
Pan American Games
Gold medal – first place	1987 Indianapolis	20 km
Bronze medal – third place	1983 Caracas	50 km
Bolivarian Games
Gold medal – first place	1981 Barquisimeto	20 km
- Updated on 24 July 2013

José Querubín Moreno Moreno (born December 29, 1959) is a retired Colombian race walker.

His three younger brothers Clodomiro, Héctor and Antonio were racewalkers as well.

== Personal best ==
- 20 km: 1:20:19 hrs – (United States) New York City, 3 May 1987

== Achievements ==
Year	Competition	Venue	Position	Event	Notes
Representing Colombia
1981	Bolivarian Games	Barquisimeto, Venezuela	1st	20 km	1:37:56
1983	Central American and Caribbean Championships	Havana, Cuba	2nd	20 km	1:29:54
1983	Pan American Games	Caracas, Venezuela	3rd	50 km	4:23:20
1983	Ibero-American Championships	Barcelona, Spain	1st	20 km	1:31:02
1984	Pan American Race Walking Cup	Bucaramanga, Colombia	1st	20 km	1:25:19
1984	Olympic Games	Los Angeles, United States	8th	20 km	1:26:04
1984	Olympic Games	Los Angeles, United States	—	50 km	DNF
1985	World Race Walking Cup	St John's, Isle of Man	38th	20 km	1:32:59
1986	Goodwill Games	Moscow, Soviet Union	11th	20 km	1:27:01
1986	Pan American Race Walking Cup	Saint Léonard, Canada	6th	20 km	1:24:16
1987	Pan American Games	Indianapolis, United States	1st	20 km	1:27:08
1987	Pan American Games	Indianapolis, United States	–	50 km	DNF
1987	World Race Walking Cup	New York City, United States	4th	20 km	1:20:19
1987	World Championships	Rome, Italy	8th	20 km	1:23.42
1988	Olympic Games	Seoul, South Korea	—	20 km	DNF
1989	South American Championships	Medellín, Colombia	3rd	20 km	1:28:32 A
1991	World Race Walking Cup	San Jose, United States	36th	20 km	1:25:11
1991	World Race Walking Cup	San Jose, United States	—	50 km	DNF
1991	South American Championships	Manaus, Brazil	2nd	20 km	1:28:56
1991	Pan American Games	Havana, Cuba	9th	20 km	1:35:23
1991	Pan American Games	Havana, Cuba	4th	50 km	4:23:48
1992	Ibero-American Championships	Seville, Spain	4th	20 km	1:26:00.4
1993	World Race Walking Cup	Monterrey, Mexico	26th	20 km	1:29:05
1993	South American Championships	Lima, Peru	2nd	20 km	1:24:50
1993	Central American and Caribbean Games	Ponce, Puerto Rico	–	50 km	DNF
1994	Ibero-American Championships	Mar del Plata, Argentina	2nd	20 km	1:21:37.17
1995	Pan American Games	Mar del Plata, Argentina	4th	20 km	1:24:29
1995	Pan American Games	Mar del Plata, Argentina	–	50 km	DNF
1995	South American Championships	Manaus, Brazil	1st	20 km	1:28:57.3 CR
