= Athletics at the 1963 Pan American Games – Men's 800 metres =

Men's 800 metres at the Pan American Games

The men's 800 metres event at the 1963 Pan American Games was held at the Pacaembu Stadium in São Paulo on 30 April and 1 May.

== Medalists ==
Gold	Silver	Bronze
Don Bertoia; Canada	Siegmar Ohlemann; Canada	Ernie Cunliffe; United States

== Results ==
=== Heats ===
Rank	Heat	Name	Nationality	Time	Notes
1	2	Don Bertoia	Canada	1:51.59	Q
2	2	Bill Dotson	United States	1:52.34	Q
3	2	Caspar Springer	Barbados	1:52.62	
4	1	Ernie Cunliffe	United States	1:53.05	Q
5	2	Alejandro Arroyo	Ecuador	1:53.14	
6	1	Leslie Mentor	Venezuela	1:53.19	Q
7	1	José Sobrinho	Brazil	1:54.43	
8	3	Siegmar Ohlemann	Canada	1:55.00	Q
9	3	Paulo de Araújo	Brazil	1:55.27	Q
10	3	Carver King	Trinidad and Tobago	1:57.3	
11	2	Victor Gadea	Uruguay	1:59.78	
	1	Luis Alarcón	Chile	DNS	
	1	Mario Zambrano	Ecuador	DNS	
	3	Lloyd Bacchus	British Guiana	DNS	
	3	José Manuel Luna	Mexico	DNS	

=== Final ===
Rank	Name	Nationality	Time	Notes
1st place, gold medalist(s)	Don Bertoia	Canada	1:48.46	
2nd place, silver medalist(s)	Siegmar Ohlemann	Canada	1:48.63	
3rd place, bronze medalist(s)	Ernie Cunliffe	United States	1:48.92	
4	Paulo de Araújo	Brazil	1:52.82	
5	Bill Dotson	United States	1:57.40	
	Leslie Mentor	Venezuela	DQ	
