= Athletics at the 1983 Pan American Games – Men's 20 kilometres walk =

Men's 20 kilometres walk at the Pan American Games

The men's 20 kilometres walk event at the 1983 Pan American Games was held in Caracas, Venezuela on 24 August.

== Results ==
Rank	Name	Nationality	Time	Notes
1st place, gold medalist(s)	Ernesto Canto	Mexico	1:28:12	
2nd place, silver medalist(s)	Raúl González	Mexico	1:29:21	
3rd place, bronze medalist(s)	Héctor Moreno	Colombia	1:30:05	
4	Francisco Vargas	Colombia	1:33:17	
5	Marcel Jobin	Canada	1:34:05	
6	Jim Heiring	United States	1:34:47	
7	José Víctor Alonzo	Guatemala	1:37:18	
8	Santiago Fonseca	Honduras	1:38:38	
9	David Castro	Cuba	1:39:35	
10	Mario Rodríguez	Panama	1:40:21	
11	Carlos Ramones	Venezuela	1:42:04	
12	Omar Guerra	Venezuela	1:46:41	
13	Nelson Funes	Guatemala	1:50:38	
14	Rafael Valladares	Honduras	1:51:34	
