= Torneo de Copa de Puerto Rico =

Tournament of Puerto Rican football

The Torneo de Copa de Puerto Rico is the top knockout tournament of Puerto Rican football. In its inaugural year it was played entirely at Estadio Sixto Escobar over the course of one week, as a round-robin tournament with teams from three other nations invited.

== Winners ==
- 2000 : Tampa Bay Mutiny 3–0 record in group play
- 2006 : Fraigcomar 2–1 Academia de Quintana

=== 2000 results ===
Pos	Team	GP	W	DW	DL	L	GF	GA	GD	Pts
1	(United States) Tampa Bay Mutiny	3	3	0	0	0	8	1	+7	9
2	Costa Rica U-23	3	1	1	0	1	4	4	0	5
3	(Belarus) FC Dinamo Minsk	3	1	0	1	1	6	2	+4	4
4	Puerto Rico MNT	3	0	0	0	3	0	11	-11	0
