= Sig Ohlemann =

Canadian runner (1938–2022)

Personal information
- Born: May 11, 1938 Kassel, Hesse-Nassau, Prussia, Germany
- Died: November 5, 2022 (aged 84) Eugene, Oregon, U.S.
Medal record
Men's Athletics
Representing Canada
Pan American Games
Silver medal – second place	1963 Sao Paulo	800 metres

Siegmar Karl Ohlemann (May 11, 1938 – November 5, 2022) was a German-born Canadian middle-distance runner. He competed in three events (800 metres, 4 × 100 metres and 4 × 400 metres) at the 1960 Summer Olympics in Rome, Italy. Ohlemann claimed the silver medal in 800 metres at the 1963 Pan American Games in Brazil, behind fellow Canadian Don Bertoia.

Ohlemann died in Eugene, Oregon on November 5, 2022, at the age of 84.
