= Athletics at the 1963 Pan American Games – Men's 20 kilometres walk =

Men's 20 kilometres walk at the Pan American Games

The men's 20 kilometres walk event at the 1963 Pan American Games was held at the Pacaembu Stadium in São Paulo on 3 May. It was the first time since 1951 that any racewalking event was contested at the Games.

== Results ==
Rank	Name	Nationality	Time	Notes
1st place, gold medalist(s)	Alex Oakley	Canada	1:42:44	
2nd place, silver medalist(s)	Nick Marrone	Canada	1:46:35	
3rd place, bronze medalist(s)	Ronald Zinn	United States	1:49:45	
4	Ron Laird	United States	1:52:10	
5	Renato Coutinho	Brazil	2:07:47	
6	Adalberto Fritsch	Brazil	2:21:33	
