= Athletics at the 1959 Pan American Games – Men's 10,000 metres =

Men's 10,000 metres at the Pan American Games

The men's 10,000 metres event at the 1959 Pan American Games was held at the Soldier Field in Chicago on 28 August.

== Results ==
Rank	Name	Nationality	Time	Notes
1st place, gold medalist(s)	Osvaldo Suárez	Argentina	30:17.2	
2nd place, silver medalist(s)	Doug Kyle	Canada	30:28.0	
3rd place, bronze medalist(s)	Bob Soth	United States	30:51.8	
4	George De Peana	British Guiana	31:16.0	
5	Gordon Dickson	Canada	31:18.0	
6	Alex Breckenridge	United States	31:18.6	
7	Ricardo Vidal	Chile	31:35.7	
8	Luis Bocanegra	Argentina	31:40.2	
9	Alfonso Díaz	Mexico	31:42.8	
10	Henry Glyde	Canada	32:13.0	
11	Guadelupe Jiménez	Mexico	32:13.1	
12	Isidro Segura	Mexico	32:44.0	
13	Jesús Queche	Guatemala	33:05.3	
	Walter Lemos	Argentina	DNS	
	Armando Pino	Argentina	DNS	
	Moses Dwarka	British Guiana	DNS	
	Juan Silva	Chile	DNS	
	Sebastián García	Guatemala	DNS	
	Macario Subuyuj	Guatemala	DNS	
	Max Truex	United States	DNS	
