= Joanne Dow =

American racewalker

Personal information
- Born: March 19, 1964 (age 62) Manchester, New Hampshire, United States

Sport
- Sport: Track and field
Medal record
Representing United States
Pan American Games
Bronze medal – third place	2003 Santo Domingo	20km walk

Joanne Dow (born March 19, 1964) is an American former athlete who competed in racewalking. She made her first Olympic team at the age of 44, competing in the 20 kilometer walk for the United States at the 2008 Summer Olympics. She placed 30th with a time of 1:34:15.

== Early life and education ==
Born in Manchester, New Hampshire, Dow graduated from Trinity High School in Manchester in 1982. She graduated from the University of New Hampshire in 1986. Dow was a sprinter and swimmer in college.

== Racewalking ==
Dow took up the sport of racewalking in 1994. She placed fourth in the 20 km walk at the 2000 U.S. Olympic Trials and second at the 2004 U.S. Olympic Trials Dow was a sprinter and swimmer in college. Dow won indoor national championships in 1999, 2002, 2003, 2004, 2006 and outdoor national championships in 1998, 2002, and 2006.

== Later career ==
Dow was a Health teacher at Pembroke Academy in New Hampshire. She later worked at Auburn Village School in NH.

== Achievements ==
Year	Competition	Venue	Position	Event	Notes
Representing the United States
1998	Goodwill Games	New York, United States	3rd	10 km	45:36.92
1998	Pan American Race Walking Cup	Miami, United States	1st	20 km	1:38:57
1999	World Championships	Seville, Spain	—	20 km	DSQ
2003	Pan American Games	Santo Domingo, Dominican Republic	3rd	20 km	1:35:48
2003	World Championships	Paris, France	24th	20 km	1:36:32
2008	Olympic Games	Beijing, China	30th	20 km	1:34.15
