= Walter Lemos =

Argentine long-distance runner

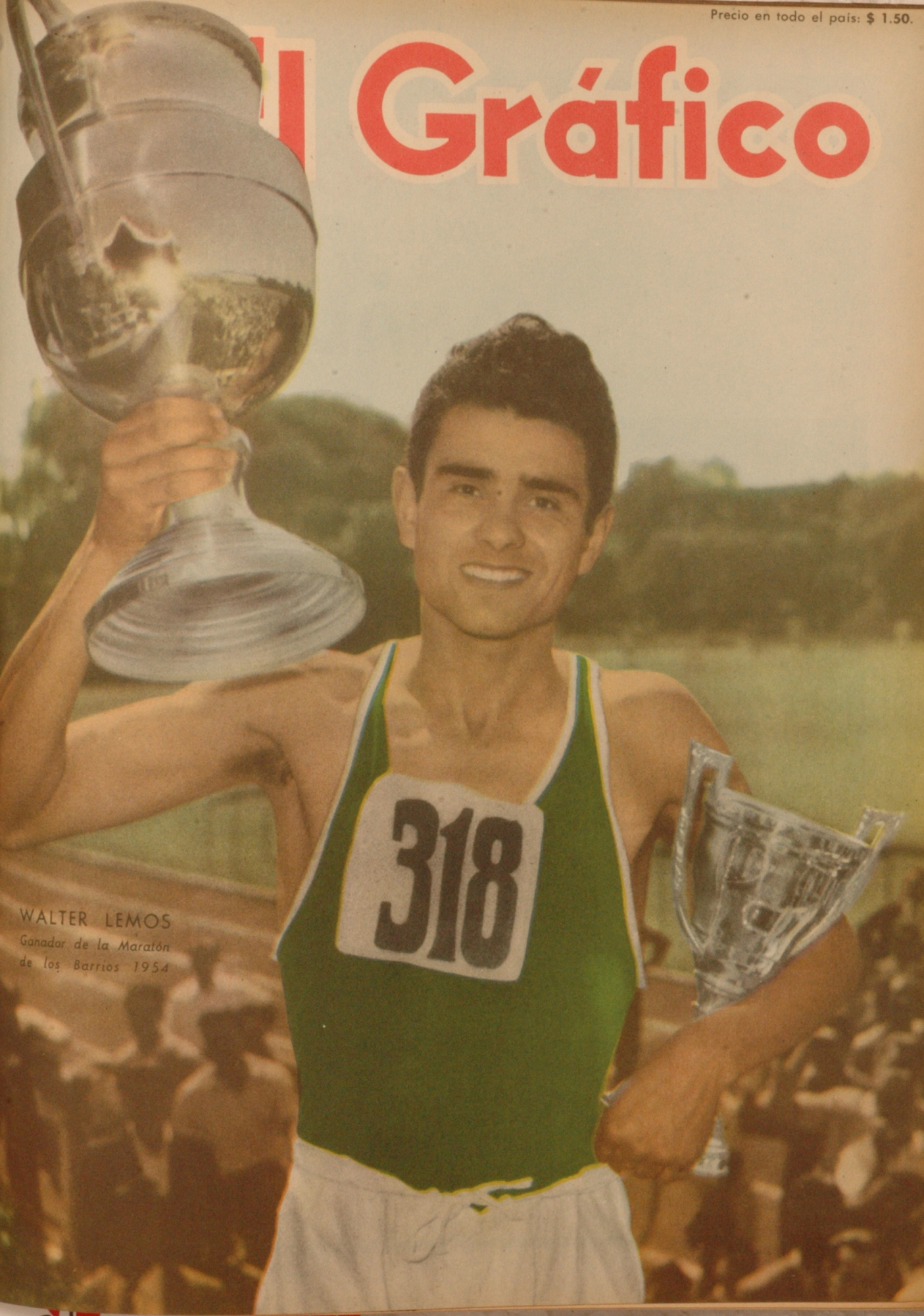
- Walter Lemos in 1954

Personal information
- Full name: Walter Cándido Lemos
- Born: 23 March 1930 Sunchales, Santa Fe, Argentina
- Died: 10 June 2014 (aged 84) Buenos Aires, Argentina
- Height: 1.76 m (5 ft 9 in)
- Weight: 65 kg (143 lb)

Sport
- Sport: Long-distance running
- Event: Marathon

Walter Cándido Lemos (23 March 1930 – 10 June 2014) was an Argentine long-distance runner. He competed in the marathon at the 1960 Summer Olympics.

== International competitions ==
Year	Competition	Venue	Position	Event	Notes
Representing Argentina
1952	South American Championships	Buenos Aires, Argentina	6th	5000 m	15:21.0
1956	South American Championships	Santiago, Chile	3rd	5000 m	14:51.7
1956	South American Championships	Santiago, Chile	2nd	10,000 m	30:27.4
1956	South American Championships	Santiago, Chile	2nd	Half marathon	1:09:00
1957	South American Championships (unofficial)	Santiago, Chile	1st	10,000 m	30:44.4
1957	South American Championships (unofficial)	Santiago, Chile	1st	Half marathon	1:05:14
1958	South American Championships	Montevideo, Uruguay	2nd	5000 m	14:40.6
1958	South American Championships	Montevideo, Uruguay	2nd	10,000 m	30:37.4
1958	South American Championships	Montevideo, Uruguay	–	Half marathon	DNF
1959	Pan American Games	Chicago, United States	7th	Marathon	2:49:19
1960	Olympic Games	Rome, Italy	50th	Marathon	2:36:55

== Personal bests ==
- 3000 metres – 8:15.9h (Villa Dominico 1956)
- 5000 metres – 14:26.4h (Buenos Aires 1956)
- 10,000 metres – 29:39.8h (Buenos Aires 1957)
- Half marathon – 1:05:14 (Santiago 1957)
