= Athletics at the 1987 Pan American Games – Women's shot put =

Women's shot put at the Pan American Games

The women's shot put event at the 1987 Pan American Games was held in Indianapolis, United States on 12 August.

== Results ==
Rank	Name	Nationality	#1	#2	#3	#4	#5	#6	Result	Notes
1st place, gold medalist(s)	Ramona Pagel	United States	17.60	17.92	18.56	17.24	17.75	18.08	18.56	
2nd place, silver medalist(s)	María Sarría	Cuba	16.95	17.18	17.45	17.50	x	18.12	18.12	
3rd place, bronze medalist(s)	Belsis Laza	Cuba	17.50	x	x	17.96	x	18.06	18.06	
4	Deborah Saint-Phard	Haiti	15.18	15.23	16.49	16.58	16.56	16.14	16.58	NR
5	Pam Dukes	United States	16.30	x	16.47	x	x	x	16.47	
6	Melody Torcolacci	Canada	15.33	15.53	15.35	15.36	15.53	15.09	15.53	
7	María Urrutia	Colombia	13.47	13.80	14.47	14.10	x	x	14.47	
