= Athletics at the 1955 Pan American Games – Men's 5000 metres =

Men's 5000 metres at the Pan American Games

The men's 5000 metres event at the 1955 Pan American Games was held at the Estadio Universitario in Mexico City on 15 March.

== Results ==
Rank	Name	Nationality	Time	Notes
1st place, gold medalist(s)	Osvaldo Suárez	Argentina	15:30.6	
2nd place, silver medalist(s)	Horace Ashenfelter	United States	15:31.4	
3rd place, bronze medalist(s)	Jaime Correa	Chile	15:39.2	
4	Gordon McKenzie	United States	15:51.8	
5	Francisco Hernández	Mexico	16:02.4	
6	Jesús González	Mexico	16:25.4	
7	Isidro Resendiz	Mexico	??:??.?	
8	Edgard Freire	Brazil	??:??.?	
9	Matias Vallejos	Paraguay	??:??.?	
10	Guillermo Rojas	Guatemala	??:??.?	
11	Nery Losse	Guatemala	??:??.?	
12	Emerito Estrella	Dominican Republic	??:??.?	
13	Gilberto Miora	Argentina	??:??.?	
14	Luiz Rodrigues	Brazil	??:??.?	
	Juan Miranda	Argentina	DNS	
	Francisco Paniagua	Guatemala	DNS	
