= Sally McCallum =

Medal record

Women's Athletics

Representing Canada

Pan American Games
Bronze medal – third place	1959 Chicago	200 metres
Bronze medal – third place	1959 Chicago	4×100 metres relay

Sally McCallum (born August 7, 1940, in Vancouver) is a retired female track and field athlete from Canada, who represented her native country in three events (4 × 100 m relay, 80-meter hurdles and long jump) at the 1960 Summer Olympics in Rome, Italy. She claimed the bronze medal in the women's 200 meters event at the 1959 Pan American Games.
