= Athletics at the 1983 Pan American Games – Men's 3000 metres steeplechase =

Men's 3,000 metres steeplechase at the Pan American Games

The men's 3000 metres steeplechase event at the 1983 Pan American Games was held in Caracas, Venezuela on 26 August.

== Results ==
| Rank | Name | Nationality | Time | Notes |
|---|---|---|---|---|
| 1st place, gold medalist(s) | Emilio Ulloa | Chile | 8:57.62 | |
| 2nd place, silver medalist(s) | Carmelo Ríos | Puerto Rico | 9:01.47 | |
| 3rd place, bronze medalist(s) | Greg Duhaime | Canada | 9:06.03 | |
| 4 | Dave Daniels | United States | 9:08.73 | |
| 5 | Rafael Colmenares | Venezuela | 9:15.04 | |
| 6 | José Martínez | Venezuela | 9:26.22 | |
| 7 | Tyrone Thibou | Antigua and Barbuda | 10:23.00 | |
| | Henry Marsh | United States | DNS | |
| | Phil Laheurte | Canada | DNS | |
