= Athletics at the 1951 Pan American Games – Men's 50 kilometres walk =

Men's 50 kilometres walk at the Pan American Games

The men's 50 kilometres walk event at the 1951 Pan American Games was held at the Estadio Monumental in Buenos Aires on 28 February. The event would not be contested again at the Games until 1967.

== Results ==
| Rank | Name | Nationality | Time | Notes |
|---|---|---|---|---|
| 1st place, gold medalist(s) | Sixto Ibáñez | Argentina | 5:06:07 | |
| 2nd place, silver medalist(s) | James Jackson | Trinidad and Tobago | 5:21:13 | |
| 3rd place, bronze medalist(s) | Armando González | Argentina | 5:27:01 | |
| 4 | Carmelo Caputo | Argentina | 5:28:40 | |
| | Henry Laskau | United States | DNS | |
