= Athletics at the 1967 Pan American Games – Women's discus throw =

Women's discus throw at the Pan American Games

The women's discus throw event at the 1967 Pan American Games was held in Winnipeg on 29 July.

== Results ==
Rank	Name	Nationality	#1	#2	#3	#4	#5	#6	Result	Notes
1st place, gold medalist(s)	Carol Moseke	United States	49.10	45.40	47.40	38.08	49.24	46.92	49.24	
2nd place, silver medalist(s)	Carol Martin	Canada	47.96	43.08	44.24	43.66	47.76	47.10	47.96	
3rd place, bronze medalist(s)	Caridad Agüero	Cuba	42.32	46.68	45.24	x	46.48	44.80	46.68	
4	Marlene Kurt	Canada	x	44.86	45.62	43.64	x	45.90	45.90	
5	Ranee Kletchka	United States	40.00	45.78	44.74	x	43.80	40.06	45.78	
6	Hilda Ramírez	Cuba	43.66	44.62	40.64	x	41.18	44.42	44.62	
	Guadalupe Lartigue	Mexico							DNS	
