= Athletics at the 1967 Pan American Games – Women's 800 metres =

Women's 800 metres at the Pan American Games

The women's 800 metres event at the 1967 Pan American Games was held in Winnipeg on 4 and 5 August.

== Medalists ==
Gold	Silver	Bronze
Madeline Manning; United States	Doris Brown; United States	Abby Hoffman; Canada

== Results ==
=== Heats ===
Rank	Heat	Name	Nationality	Time	Notes
1	1	Doris Brown	United States	2:13.24	Q
2	1	Abby Hoffman	Canada	2:13.93	Q
3	1	Irenice Rodrigues	Brazil	2:14.43	Q
4	2	Madeline Manning	United States	2:15.41	Q
5	2	Roberta Picco	Canada	2:15.52	Q
6	1	Aurelia Pentón	Cuba	2:17.91	Q
7	2	Alicia Enríquez	Argentina	2:20.45	Q
8	2	Lucía Quiroz	Mexico	2:22.94	Q
9	1	Gladys Azcuaga	Mexico	2:24.93	

=== Final ===
Rank	Name	Nationality	Time	Notes
1st place, gold medalist(s)	Madeline Manning	United States	2:02.35	
2nd place, silver medalist(s)	Doris Brown	United States	2:02.95	
3rd place, bronze medalist(s)	Abby Hoffman	Canada	2:04.82	
4	Roberta Picco	Canada	2:07.54	
5	Irenice Rodrigues	Brazil	2:08.56	
6	Alicia Enríquez	Argentina	2:15.09	
7	Aurelia Pentón	Cuba	2:15.45	
8	Lucía Quiroz	Mexico	2:20.72	
