= Athletics at the 1951 Pan American Games – Men's 10,000 metres walk =

Men's 10 kilometres walk at the Pan American Games

The men's 10,000 metres walk event at the 1951 Pan American Games was held at the Estadio Monumental in Buenos Aires on 6 March. Race walking would not be contested again at the Games until 1963.

== Results ==
Rank	Name	Nationality	Time	Notes
1st place, gold medalist(s)	Henry Laskau	United States	50:26.8	
2nd place, silver medalist(s)	Luis Turza	Argentina	52:27.5	
3rd place, bronze medalist(s)	Martin Casas	Argentina	52:59.6	
4	Aldo Ramírez	Argentina	53:37.6	
5	James Jackson	Trinidad and Tobago	57:31.0	
