= Athletics at the 1971 Pan American Games – Men's decathlon =

Men's decathlon at the Pan American Games

The men's decathlon event at the 1971 Pan American Games was held in Cali on 1 and 2 August.

== Results ==
The highest mark recorded in each event is highlighted in yellow

| Rank | Athlete | Nationality | 100m | LJ | SP | HJ | 400m | 110m H | DT | PV | JT | 1500m | Points | Notes |
|---|---|---|---|---|---|---|---|---|---|---|---|---|---|---|
| 1st place, gold medalist(s) | Rick Wanamaker | United States | 11.3 | 6.95 | 14.80 | 1.95 | 49.6 | 14.8 | 46.00 | 4.60 | 58.14 | 5:16.0 | 7648 | |
| 2nd place, silver medalist(s) | Russ Hodge | United States | 10.8 | 6.43 | 16.24 | 1.90 | 48.9 | 15.4 | 42.60 | 3.80 | 57.32 | 5:04.9 | 7314 | |
| 3rd place, bronze medalist(s) | Jesús Mirabal | Cuba | 10.7 | 7.11 | 13.01 | 1.80 | 49.1 | 15.0 | 40.94 | 4.00 | 51.20 | 5:06.4 | 7295 | |
| 4 | Roberto Carmona Botella | Mexico | 11.3 | 6.59 | 13.81 | 1.65 | 53.6 | 16.2 | 39.92 | 3.70 | 50.94 | 4:37.7 | 6706 | |
| 5 | Néstor Villegas | Colombia | 11.29 | 6.60 | 13.18 | 1.70 | 50.44 | 16.30 | 39.06 | 3.30 | 47.02 | 4:44.8 | 6636 | |
| 6 | José Montezuma | Venezuela | 11.5 | 6.33 | 11.92 | 1.75 | 50.7 | 16.1 | 34.68 | 3.10 | 50.74 | 4:42.2 | 6396 | |
| 7 | Emilio Mazzeo | Argentina | 11.6 | 6.78 | 12.07 | 1.80 | 53.2 | 16.8 | 33.62 | 3.20 | 45.72 | 5:00.1 | 6195 | |
| 8 | Gordon Stewart | Canada | 11.8 | 6.01 | 11.91 | 1.75 | 52.4 | 16.9 | 37.28 | 3.30 | 54.48 | 4:59.3 | 6156 | |
| | Daniel Danache | Haiti | 11.5 | 6.03 | 11.72 | 1.70 | 51.1 | ? | – | – | – | – | DNF | |
| | José Carreño | Venezuela | 11.4 | 6.34 | 12.67 | 1.65 | 55.6 | ? | – | – | – | – | DNF | |
| | Guillermo González | Puerto Rico | DNS | – | – | – | – | – | – | – | – | – | DNS | |
