= Athletics at the 1987 Pan American Games – Men's 20 kilometres walk =

Men's 20 kilometres walk at the Pan American Games

The men's 20 kilometres walk event at the 1987 Pan American Games was held in Indianapolis, United States on 10 August.

== Results ==
Rank	Name	Nationality	Time	Notes
1st place, gold medalist(s)	Carlos Mercenario	Mexico	1:24:50	GR
2nd place, silver medalist(s)	Tim Lewis	United States	1:25:50	
3rd place, bronze medalist(s)	Querubín Moreno	Colombia	1:27:08	
4	Carlos Ramones	Venezuela	1:29:36	
5	Carl Schueler	United States	1:29:53	
6	Santiago Fonseca	Honduras	1:30:48	
7	José Víctor Alonzo	Guatemala	1:31:19	
8	Paul Turpin	Canada	1:33:58	
9	Nelson Funes	Guatemala	1:40:04	
10	José León	El Salvador	1:40:10	
	Zenon Quispe	Bolivia	DNF	
	Ernesto Canto	Mexico	DNF	
