= Athletics at the 1967 Pan American Games – Women's shot put =

Women's shot put at the Pan American Games

The women's shot put event at the 1967 Pan American Games was held in Winnipeg on 5 August.

== Results ==
Rank	Name	Nationality	#1	#2	#3	#4	#5	#6	Result	Notes
1st place, gold medalist(s)	Nancy McCredie	Canada	14.79	13.74	14.55	14.43	14.25	15.18	15.18	
2nd place, silver medalist(s)	Lynn Graham	United States	14.76	13.49	14.63	14.88	13.79	14.73	14.88	
3rd place, bronze medalist(s)	Maureen Dowds	Canada	x	14.35	13.56	13.94	14.30	x	14.35	
4	Maren Seidler	United States	13.46	13.08	14.11	13.64	13.66	13.97	14.11	
5	Hilda Ramírez	Cuba	14.07	13.26	x	13.08	12.70	13.13	14.07	
6	Rosa Molina	Chile	13.68	13.41	12.67	x	12.98	13.62	13.68	
7	Norma Suárez	Argentina	x	13.33	13.10				13.33	
8	Guadalupe Lartigue	Mexico	x	13.13	x				13.13	
9	Delia Vera	Peru	10.56	9.75	10.85				10.85	
