= Athletics at the 1963 Pan American Games – Women's discus throw =

Women's discus throw at the Pan American Games

The women's discus throw event at the 1963 Pan American Games was held at the Pacaembu Stadium in São Paulo on 3 May.

== Results ==
| Rank | Name | Nationality | Result | Notes |
|---|---|---|---|---|
| 1st place, gold medalist(s) | Nancy McCredie | Canada | 50.18 | |
| 2nd place, silver medalist(s) | Ingeborg Pfüller | Argentina | 47.83 | |
| 3rd place, bronze medalist(s) | Sharon Shepherd | United States | 47.29 | |
| 4 | Caridad Agüero | Cuba | 45.02 | |
| 5 | Myriam Yutronic | Chile | 42.69 | |
| 6 | Cynthia Wyatt | United States | 42.32 | |
| 7 | Odette Domingos | Brazil | 40.43 | |
| 8 | Iris dos Santos | Brazil | 39.48 | |
| | Patricia Dobie | Canada | DNS | |
| | Pradelia Delgado | Chile | DNS | |
