= Athletics at the 1963 Pan American Games – Men's pole vault =

Men's pole vault at the Pan American Games

The men's pole vault event at the 1963 Pan American Games was held at the Pacaembu Stadium in São Paulo on 28 April.

== Results ==
| Rank | Name | Nationality | Result | Notes |
|---|---|---|---|---|
| 1st place, gold medalist(s) | Dave Tork | United States | 4.90 | |
| 2nd place, silver medalist(s) | Henry Wadsworth | United States | 4.75 | |
| 3rd place, bronze medalist(s) | Rubén Cruz | Puerto Rico | 4.30 | |
| 4 | Ayrton Turini | Brazil | 3.80 | |
| 5 | Jessemon Siqueira | Brazil | 3.80 | |
| | Luis Meza | Chile | NM | |
