= Caspar Springer =

Barbadian sprinter

Personal information
- Nationality: Barbadian
- Born: 24 January 1937 (age 89)

Sport
- Sport: Sprinting
- Event: 400 metres

Caspar Springer (born 24 January 1937) is a Barbadian sprinter. He competed in the men's 400 metres at the 1972 Summer Olympics.

== International competitions ==
| Year | Competition | Venue | Position | Event | Notes |
Representing Barbados
| 1962 | Central American and Caribbean Games | Kingston, Jamaica | 9th (h) | 400 m | 48.8 |
| 1962 | Central American and Caribbean Games | Kingston, Jamaica | 8th (h) | 800 m | 1:53.9 |
| 1962 | Central American and Caribbean Games | Kingston, Jamaica | 8th (h) | 4 × 100 m relay | 42.0 |
| 1963 | Pan American Games | São Paulo, Brazil | 3rd (h) | 800 m | 1:52.62 |
| 1972 | Olympic Games | Munich, West Germany | – (h) | 400 m | DNF |

== Personal bests ==
- 400 metres – 47.2h (1972)
