= Athletics at the 1959 Pan American Games – Men's marathon =

Men's marathon at the Pan American Games

The men's marathon event at the 1959 Pan American Games was held at the Soldier Field in Chicago on 2 September 1959.

== Results ==
Rank	Name	Nationality	Time	Notes
1st place, gold medalist(s)	John J. Kelley	United States	2:27:55	
2nd place, silver medalist(s)	Jim Green	United States	2:32:17	
3rd place, bronze medalist(s)	Gordon Dickson	Canada	2:36:18	
4	Alf Confalone	United States	2:38:53	
5	Juan Silva	Chile	2:42:35	
6	Macario Subuyuj	Guatemala	2:42:40	
7	Walter Lemos	Argentina	2:49:19	
8	Salvador Rosales	Mexico	3:13:38	
	Armando Pino	Argentina	DNF	
	Sebastián García	Guatemala	DNF	
	Pedro Alvarado	Mexico	DNF	
	Moses Dwarka	British Guiana	DNF	
	Doug Kyle	Canada	DNF	
	Juan Villagrán	Guatemala	DNF	
