= Athletics at the 1955 Pan American Games – Men's 10,000 metres =

Men's 10,000 metres at the Pan American Games

The men's 10,000 metres event at the 1955 Pan American Games was held at the Estadio Universitario in Mexico City on 13 March.

== Results ==
| Rank | Name | Nationality | Time | Notes |
|---|---|---|---|---|
| 1st place, gold medalist(s) | Osvaldo Suárez | Argentina | 32:42.6 | |
| 2nd place, silver medalist(s) | Vicente Sánchez | Mexico | 33:00.4 | |
| 3rd place, bronze medalist(s) | Jaime Correa | Chile | 33:42.6 | |
| 4 | Francisco Hernández | Mexico | 33:49.8 | |
| 5 | Cruz Serrano | Mexico | 34:35.6 | |
| 6 | Doroteo Flores | Guatemala | 35:10.8 | |
| 7 | Guillermo Rojas | Guatemala | ??:??.? | |
| 8 | Matias Vallejos | Paraguay | ??:??.? | |
| 9 | Edgard Freire | Brazil | ??:??.? | |
| | Gordon McKenzie | United States | DNF | |
| | Francisco Paniagua | Guatemala | DNF | |
