= Teresita Collado =

Guatemalan racewalker

Personal information
- Born: 20 November 1971 (age 54) Chinique, Guatemala
- Height: 1.58 m (5 ft 2 in)
- Weight: 49 kg (108 lb)

Sport
- Sport: Athletics
- Event: Race walking

Teresita Natvidad Collado Ramos (born 20 November 1971 in Chinique, El Quiché) is a retired Guatemalan athlete specialising in the race walking. She represented her country at the 2000 and 2004 Summer Olympics.

== Competition record ==
Year	Competition	Venue	Position	Event	Notes
Representing Guatemala
1998	Pan American Race Walking Cup	Miami, United States	8th	20 km walk	1:46:37
1998	Central American Championships	Guatemala City, Guatemala	1st	10,000 m walk	49:39.4
1999	World Race Walking Cup	Mézidon-Canon, France	44th	20 km walk	1:36:43
1999	World Championships	Seville, Spain	35th	20 km walk	1:41:12
2000	Pan American Race Walking Cup	Poza Rica, Mexico	5th	20 km walk	1:37:29
2000	Olympic Games	Sydney, Australia	41st	20 km walk	1:43.28
2001	Central American and Caribbean Championships	Guatemala City, Guatemala	2nd	20,000 m walk	47:36
2001	World Championships	Edmonton, Canada	26th	20 km walk	1:42:43
2001	Central American Games	Guatemala City, Guatemala	1st	20 km walk	1:40:29
2002	Ibero-American Championships	Guatemala City, Guatemala	4th	20,000 m walk	1:41:56
2002	World Race Walking Cup	Turin, Italy	44th	20 km walk	1:39:27
2002	Central American and Caribbean Games	San Salvador, El Salvador	3rd	20 km walk	1:42:07
2003	Pan American Games	Santo Domingo, Dom. Rep.	7th	20 km walk	1:39:18
2003	World Championships	Paris, France	28th	20 km walk	1:41:19
2004	World Race Walking Cup	Naumburg, Germany	49th	20 km walk	1:36:21
2004	Ibero-American Championships	Huelva, Spain	6th	10,000 m walk	48:57.31
2004	Olympic Games	Athens, Greece	49th	20 km walk	1:46:41

== Personal bests ==
- 10,000 metres walk – 46:46.12 (Bergen 2000) NR
- 10 kilometres walk – 45:07 (Eisenhüttenstadt 1999)
- 20,000 metres walk – 1:41:56.0 (Guatemala City 2002) NR
- 20 kilometres walk – 1:35:06 (Eisenhüttenstadt 2002)
