= Athletics at the 1967 Pan American Games – Women's high jump =

Women's high jump at the Pan American Games

The women's high jump event at the 1967 Pan American Games was held in Winnipeg on 4 August.

== Results ==
Rank	Name	Nationality	Result	Notes
1st place, gold medalist(s)	Eleanor Montgomery	United States	1.78	
2nd place, silver medalist(s)	Susan Nigh	Canada	1.72	
3rd place, bronze medalist(s)	Franzetta Parham	United States	1.69	
4	Maria Cipriano	Brazil	1.66	
5	Aída dos Santos	Brazil	1.55	
6	Audrey Reid	Jamaica	1.55	
7	Sheila Flowers	Canada	1.50	
8	Elvira Quiñonez	Ecuador	1.40	
