= Athletics at the 1971 Pan American Games – Women's high jump =

Women's high jump at the Pan American Games

The women's high jump event at the 1971 Pan American Games was held in Cali on 2 August.

== Results ==
| Rank | Name | Nationality | Result | Notes |
|---|---|---|---|---|
| 1st place, gold medalist(s) | Debbie Brill | Canada | 1.85 | GR |
| 2nd place, silver medalist(s) | Audrey Reid | Jamaica | 1.75 | |
| 3rd place, bronze medalist(s) | Andrea Bruce | Jamaica | 1.70 | |
| 4 | Brenda Simpson | United States | 1.65 | |
| 5 | Marima Rodríguez | Cuba | 1.65 | |
| 6 | Patricia Wilson | Canada | 1.60 | |
| 7 | Susan Parks | United States | 1.60 | |
| 8 | Maria Cipriano | Brazil | 1.60 | |
| 9 | Amparo Bravo | Colombia | 1.60 | |
| 10 | Silvia Tapia | Mexico | 1.55 | |
| 11 | Mary Flora Cozier | Venezuela | 1.55 | |
| 12 | Lila Negro | Argentina | 1.50 | |
| 13 | Ana María Udini | Uruguay | 1.50 | |
