= Pius Munyasia =

Kenyan racewalker

Personal information
- Nationality: Kenyan
- Born: 6 July 1960 (age 66)

Sport
- Sport: Athletics
- Event: Racewalking

Pius Munyasia (born 6 July 1960) is a Kenyan racewalker. He competed in the men's 20 kilometres walk at the 1984 Summer Olympics.
