= Ernesto Canto =

Mexican race walker (1959–2020)

Personal information
- Full name: Ernesto Canto Gudiño
- Born: 18 October 1959 Mexico City, Mexico
- Died: 20 November 2020 (aged 61) Mexico City, Mexico
- Height: 1.70 m (5 ft 7 in)
- Weight: 60 kg (132 lb)

Sport
- Country: Mexico
- Sport: Athletics
- Event: Racewalking
Medal record
Men's Athletics
Representing Mexico
Olympic Games
Gold medal – first place	1984 Los Angeles	20 km walk
World Championships
Gold medal – first place	1983 Helsinki	20 km walk
Pan American Games
Gold medal – first place	1983 Caracas	20 km walk
CAC Junior Championships (U20)
Gold medal – first place	1976 Xalapa	10,000 m track walk
Gold medal – first place	1974 Maracaibo	10,000 m track walk
- Updated on 25 July 2013

Ernesto Canto Gudiño (18 October 1959 – 20 November 2020) was a Mexican race walker who mainly competed in the 20 kilometer walk.

He competed for Mexico at the 1984 Summer Olympics held in Los Angeles, United States, where he won the gold medal in the men's 20 kilometer walk event.

Canto died in 2020 at the age of 61 from pancreatic and liver cancer.

== Personal bests ==
- 20 km: 1:19:37 hrs – Xalapa, Spain, 5 April 1987
- 50 km: 3:52:16 hrs – Prague, Czech Republic, 12 April 1982

== Achievements ==
Year	Competition	Venue	Position	Event	Notes
Representing Mexico
1974	Central American and Caribbean; Junior Championships (U-20)	Maracaibo, Venezuela	1st	10,000 m	48:34.5
1976	Central American and Caribbean; Junior Championships (U-20)	Xalapa, Mexico	1st	10,000 m	46:18.6 A
1981	World Race Walking Cup	Valencia, Spain	1st	20 km	1:23:52
1982	Central American and Caribbean Games	Havana, Cuba	1st	20 km	1:29:22
1983	World Championships	Helsinki, Finland	1st	20 km	1:20:49
1983	Pan American Games	Caracas, Venezuela	1st	20 km	1:28:12
1983	World Race Walking Cup	Bergen, Norway	2nd	20 km	1:19:41
1984	Olympic Games	Los Angeles, United States	1st	20 km	1:23:13
1984	Olympic Games	Los Angeles, United States	10th	50 km	4:07:59
1986	Central American and Caribbean Games	Santiago de los Caballeros, Dominican Republic	1st	20 km	1:26:25
1986	Pan American Race Walking Cup	Saint-Leonard, Canada	—	20 km	DNF
1987	World Indoor Championships	Indianapolis, United States	3rd	5000 m	18:38.71
1987	World Race Walking Cup	New York City, United States	5th	20 km	1:20:35
1987	Pan American Games	Indianapolis, United States	–	20 km	DNF
1987	World Championships	Rome, Italy	–	20 km	DSQ
1988	Ibero-American Championships	Mexico City, Mexico	2nd	20 km	1:24:29.0 A
1988	Olympic Games	Seoul, South Korea	—	20 km	DSQ
1988	Pan American Race Walking Cup	Mar del Plata, Argentina	2nd	20 km	1:25:15
1990	Pan American Race Walking Cup	Xalapa, Mexico	1st	20 km	1:21:46
1990	Goodwill Games	Seattle, United States	1st	20,000 m	1:23:13.12
1990	Central American and Caribbean Games	Mexico City, Mexico	1st	20 km	1:23:52
1991	Pan American Games	Havana, Cuba	5th	20 km	1:28:22
1992	Olympic Games	Barcelona, Spain	29th	20 km	1:33:51
