= Athletics at the 2003 Pan American Games – Women's 20 kilometres walk =

Women's 20 kilometres walk at the Pan American Games

The Women's 20 km Race Walking event at the 2003 Pan American Games took place on Friday August 6, 2003.

== Medalists ==
| Gold | Victoria Palacios; Mexico |
| Silver | Rosario Sánchez; Mexico |
| Bronze | Joanne Dow; United States |

== Records ==
| World Record | Wang Yan (CHN) | 01:26:22 | November 19, 2001 | Guangzhou, PR China |
| Pan Am Record | Graciela Mendoza (MEX) | 01:34:19 | July 26, 1999 | Winnipeg, Canada |

== Results ==
| Rank | Athlete | Time |
|---|---|---|
| 1 | Victoria Palacios (MEX) | 01:35:16 |
| 2 | Rosario Sánchez (MEX) | 01:35:21 |
| 3 | Joanne Dow (USA) | 01:35:48 |
| 4 | Geovana Irusta (BOL) | 01:37:08 |
| 5 | Ariana Quino (BOL) | 01:38:43 |
| 6 | Sandra Zapata (COL) | 01:38:49 |
| 7 | Teresita Collado (GUA) | 01:39:18 |
| 8 | Amber Antonia (USA) | 01:42:45 |
| 9 | Cristina Rodríguez (DOM) | 01:51:47 |
| 10 | Francisca Lora (DOM) | 01:52:30 |

== See also ==
- 2003 Race Walking Year Ranking
- 2003 World Championships in Athletics – Women's 20 kilometres walk
- Athletics at the 2004 Summer Olympics – Women's 20 kilometre walk
