= Athletics at the 1967 Pan American Games – Men's decathlon =

Men's decathlon at the Pan American Games

The men's decathlon event at the 1967 Pan American Games was held in Winnipeg on 1 and 2 August.

== Results ==
The highest mark recorded in each event is highlighted in yellow

Rank	Athlete	Nationality	100m	LJ	SP	HJ	400m	110m H	DT	PV	JT	1500m	Points	Notes
1st place, gold medalist(s)	Bill Toomey	United States	10.8	7.59	13.31	1.92	47.3	15.1	40.18	4.10	67.62	4:23.3	8044	
2nd place, silver medalist(s)	Héctor Thomas	Venezuela	10.8	7.21	13.83	1.70	50.5	15.6	40.04	4.00	61.42	4:52.6	7312	
3rd place, bronze medalist(s)	Dave Thoreson	United States	11.5	7.10	11.64	2.06	50.4	16.1	35.82	4.20	52.50	4:26.8	7295	
4	Dave Dorman	Canada	11.2	6.95	12.55	1.84	51.4	15.4	39.90	3.80	50.72	4:51.4	7024	
5	Steve Spencer	Canada	11.4	6.90	11.43	1.95	51.5	15.3	32.38	3.20	48.72	4:26.0	6796	
	Ansel Styles	Jamaica	10.9	6.61	7.94	1.78	48.7	??.?	–	–	–	–	DNF	
	Roberto Carmona	Mexico	10.9	?.??	–	–	–	??.?	–	–	–	–	DNF	
	David Samuel	Puerto Rico	DNS	–	–	–	–	??.?	–	–	–	–	DNS	
