= Athletics at the 1991 Pan American Games – Men's 20 kilometres walk =

Men's 20 kilometres walk at the Pan American Games

The men's 20 kilometres walk event at the 1991 Pan American Games was held in Havana, Cuba on 4 August.

== Results ==
Rank	Name	Nationality	Time	Notes
1st place, gold medalist(s)	Héctor Moreno	Colombia	1:24:56	
2nd place, silver medalist(s)	Joel Sánchez	Mexico	1:25:45	
3rd place, bronze medalist(s)	Marcelo Palma	Brazil	1:26:42	
4	Sérgio Galdino	Brazil	1:27:56	
5	Ernesto Canto	Mexico	1:28:22	
6	Julio Urías	Guatemala	1:29:26	
7	Rivardo Risquet	Cuba	1:30:33	
8	Tim Lewis	United States	1:31:07	
9	Querubín Moreno	Colombia	1:35:23	
10	Luis Quispe	Bolivia	1:37:14	
11	Curtis Fisher	United States	1:39:01	
12	Jeff Cassin	Canada	1:46:37	
