= Athletics at the 1995 Pan American Games – Women's 100 metres =

Women's 100 metres at the Pan American Games

The women's 100 metres event at the 1995 Pan American Games was held at the Estadio Atletico "Justo Roman" on 17 and 18 March.

== Medalists ==
Gold	Silver	Bronze
Chryste Gaines; United States	Liliana Allen; Cuba	Heather Samuel; Antigua and Barbuda

== Results ==
=== Heats ===
Wind:
Heat 1: +1.1 m/s, Heat 2: +0.4 m/s, Heat 3: +2.8 m/s

Rank	Heat	Name	Nationality	Time	Notes
1	3	Chryste Gaines	United States	11.25	Q
2	2	Liliana Allen	Cuba	11.31	Q
3	3	Heather Samuel	Antigua and Barbuda	11.40	Q
4	3	Dainelky Pérez	Cuba	11.45	q
5	2	Eldece Clarke	Bahamas	11.46	Q
6	1	Kerry-Ann Richards	Jamaica	11.51	Q
7	1	Felipa Palacios	Colombia	11.52	Q
8	1	Shantel Twiggs	United States	11.56	q
9	2	Cleide Amaral	Brazil	11.60	
10	2	Mirtha Brock	Colombia	11.69	
11	2	Jennifer Powell	Jamaica	11.71	
12	3	Kátia Regina Santos	Brazil	11.76	
13	3	Lisette Rondón	Chile	11.79	
14	1	Heidi Harper	Trinidad and Tobago	12.01	
15	3	Lesley Tashlin	Canada	12.06	
16	2	Virginia Lebreo	Argentina	12.08	
17	1	Daniela Lebreo	Argentina	12.14	
18	1	Marcia Daniel	Dominica	12.61	

=== Final ===
Wind: +4.90 m/s

Rank	Name	Nationality	Time	Notes
1st place, gold medalist(s)	Chryste Gaines	United States	11.05w	
2nd place, silver medalist(s)	Liliana Allen	Cuba	11.16w	
3rd place, bronze medalist(s)	Heather Samuel	Antigua and Barbuda	11.33w	
4	Dainelky Pérez	Cuba	11.50w	
5	Felipa Palacios	Colombia	11.50w	
6	Eldece Clarke	Bahamas	11.54w	
7	Shantel Twiggs	United States	11.57w	
8	Kerry-Ann Richards	Jamaica	11.61w	
