= Athletics at the 1959 Pan American Games – Men's shot put =

Men's shot put at the Pan American Games

The men's shot put event at the 1959 Pan American Games was held at the Soldier Field in Chicago on 1 September.

== Results ==
Rank	Name	Nationality	Result	Notes
1st place, gold medalist(s)	Parry O'Brien	United States	19.04	
2nd place, silver medalist(s)	Dallas Long	United States	18.51	
3rd place, bronze medalist(s)	Dave Davis	United States	17.01	
4	Enrique Horst	Argentina	15.46	
5	Stan Raike	Canada	15.23	
6	Isolino Tabordo	Brazil	14.90	
7	Alcides Dambrós	Brazil	14.88	
8	Leonardo Kittsteiner	Chile	14.65	
9	John Pavelich	Canada	14.22	
10	Lambertus Rebel-Bout	Netherlands Antilles	14.00	
	Emir Martínez	Argentina	DNS	
	Carlos Yapur	Mexico	DNS	
	Eduardo Adriana	Netherlands Antilles	DNS	
	Ramón Rosario	Puerto Rico	DNS	
	Héctor Thomas	Venezuela	DNS	
