= José Carreño (shot putter) =

Venezuelan athlete

Personal information
- Full name: José Manuel Carreño
- Born: 8 May 1949 (age 76)

Sport
- Sport: Athletics
- Event(s): Shot put, discus throw

José Manuel Carreño (born 8 May 1949) is a retired Venezuelan athlete who specialised in the shot put and discus throw. He won several medals at regional level.

== International competitions ==
| Year | Competition | Venue | Position | Event | Notes |
Representing Venezuela
| 1971 | Pan American Games | Cali, Colombia | – | Decathlon | DNF |
| 1973 | Bolivarian Games | Panama City, Panama | 1st | Shot put | 15.74 m |
| 1973 | Central American and Caribbean Championships | Maracaibo, Venezuela | 1st | Shot put | 15.94 m |
| 1974 | Central American and Caribbean Games | Santo Domingo, Dominican Republic | 1st | Shot put | 16.20 m |
| 1974 | Central American and Caribbean Games | Santo Domingo, Dominican Republic | 8th | Discus throw | 43.24 m |
| 1974 | South American Championships | Santiago, Chile | 3rd | Shot put | 15.81 m |
| 1977 | Bolivarian Games | La Paz, Bolivia | 1st | Shot put | 15.95 m |
| 1977 | Bolivarian Games | La Paz, Bolivia | 3rd | Discus throw | 44.06 m |
| 1977 | South American Championships | Montevideo, Uruguay | 2nd | Shot put | 15.70 m |
| 1977 | South American Championships | Montevideo, Uruguay | 6th | Discus throw | 43.56 m |
| 1978 | Central American and Caribbean Games | Medellín, Colombia | 4th | Shot put | 16.42 m |
| 1981 | Bolivarian Games | Barquisimeto, Venezuela | 2nd | Shot put | 15.33 m |
