= José Víctor Alonzo =

Guatemalan racewalker

Personal information
- Full name: José Víctor Alonzo Alonzo
- Nationality: Guatemalan
- Born: 1 May 1959 (age 67)
- Height: 1.69 m (5 ft 7 in)
- Weight: 57 kg (126 lb)

Sport
- Sport: Athletics
- Event: Racewalking

José Víctor Alonzo Alonzo (born 1 May 1959) is a Guatemalan racewalker who competed in international events during the 1980s and early 1990s.

== Career ==
At the 1983 Pan American Games he finished seventh in the 20 kilometre walk and did not finish the 50 kilometre walk.

He represented Guatemala at the 1984 Summer Olympics in Los Angeles, where he finished 34th in the 20 kilometre walk and 17th in the 50 kilometre walk.

At the 1987 Pan American Games he finished seventh in the 20 kilometre walk and again did not finish the 50 kilometre walk.

At the 1990 Central American and Caribbean Games he finished fourth out of five finishers in the 50 kilometre walk.

== Personal bests ==
- 20 km walk: 1:29:14 (1987)
- 50 km walk: 4:03:38 (1990)
