= Athletics at the 1967 Pan American Games – Women's javelin throw =

Women's javelin throw at the Pan American Games

The women's javelin throw event at the 1967 Pan American Games was held in Winnipeg on 2 August.

== Results ==
Rank	Name	Nationality	#1	#2	#3	#4	#5	#6	Result	Notes
1st place, gold medalist(s)	Barbara Friedrich	United States	46.72	50.34	52.66	50.22	52.02	53.26	53.26	
2nd place, silver medalist(s)	RaNae Bair	United States	51.64	50.72	x	x	50.20	x	51.64	
3rd place, bronze medalist(s)	Jay Dahlgren	Canada	x	43.16	44.30	x	44.42	45.46	45.46	
4	Blanca Umaña	Colombia	40.28	39.22	x	39.60	44.06	39.80	44.06	
5	María del Carmen Moreno	Cuba	x	36.18	41.02	42.48	43.05	x	43.05	
6	Beryl Rodrigues	Canada	38.10	39.85	x	x	x	x	39.85	
7	Martha González	Mexico	37.78	x	39.00				39.00	
8	Delia Vera	Peru	37.02	38.24	38.22				38.24	
9	Mayra Soto	Costa Rica	32.52	32.90	30.48				32.90	
