= Athletics at the 1983 Pan American Games – Women's shot put =

Women's shot put at the Pan American Games

The women's shot put event at the 1983 Pan American Games was held in Caracas, Venezuela on 28 August.

== Results ==
Rank	Name	Nationality	Result	Notes
1st place, gold medalist(s)	María Elena Sarría	Cuba	19.34	=CR
~~2~~	Rosa Fernández	Cuba	~~17.39~~	DQ
2nd place, silver medalist(s)	Lorna Griffin	United States	16.61	
3rd place, bronze medalist(s)	Rose Hauch	Canada	16.38	
4	Denise Wood	United States	14.92	
5	Luz Bohórquez	Venezuela	13.05	
6	Ivonne Omier	Nicaragua	11.89	
