= José Valente =

Brazilian middle-distance runner

Personal information
- Full name: José Mauro Valente
- Born: July 1, 1969 (age 56) Senador Firmino, Minas Gerais, Brazil

Sport
- Country: Brazil
- Sport: Track and field
- Event: Middle-distance running
Medal record
Representing Brazil
Pan American Games
Gold medal – first place	1991 Havana	1500m
- Updated on 31 January 2015

José Mauro Valente (born July 1, 1969) is a retired male middle-distance runner from Brazil.

== Personal bests ==
He set his personal best in the men's 1500 metres event (3:38.07) on May 21, 1994 at a meet in São Paulo.

Event	Result	Venue	Date
800 m	1:47.1 min (ht)	Cubatão, Brazil	13 Apr 1991
1500 m	3:38.07 min	São Paulo, Brazil	21 May 1994
Half marathon	1:08:39 hrs	Rio de Janeiro, Brazil	25 Aug 2002
Marathon	2:18:58 hrs	Hamburg, Germany	27 Apr 2003

== International competitions ==
Year	Competition	Venue	Position	Event	Notes
Representing Brazil
1988	South American Junior Championships	Cubatão, Brazil	2nd	1500 m	3:53.9 (ht)
1990	Ibero-American Championships	Manaus, Brazil	3rd	1500 m	3:43.17
1991	Pan American Games	Havana, Cuba	–	800 m	DNF
1991	Pan American Games	Havana, Cuba	1st	1500 m	3:42.90
1995	World Indoor Championships	Barcelona, Spain	9th	1500 m	3:46.71
1996	Ibero-American Championships	Medellín, Colombia	2nd	1500 m	3:43.81
1997	South American Championships	Mar del Plata, Argentina	2nd	1500 m	3:50.64
2000	South American Road Mile Championships	Rio de Janeiro, Brazil	1st	One mile	4:07
2001	South American Road Mile Championships	Rio de Janeiro, Brazil	—	One mile	DNF
