= Athletics at the 1963 Pan American Games – Women's high jump =

Women's high jump at the Pan American Games

The women's high jump event at the 1963 Pan American Games was held at the Pacaembu Stadium in São Paulo on 3 May.

== Results ==
Rank	Name	Nationality	Result	Notes
1st place, gold medalist(s)	Eleanor Montgomery	United States	1.68	
2nd place, silver medalist(s)	Dianne Gerace	Canada	1.65	
3rd place, bronze medalist(s)	Patricia Callender	Barbados	1.62	
4	Maria Cipriano	Brazil	1.59	
5	Aída dos Santos	Brazil	1.53	
6	Estelle Baskerville	United States	1.53	
7	Sandra Barr	Canada	1.53	
8	Hilda Fabré	Cuba	1.50	
9	Ana María Udini	Uruguay	1.45	
	Brenda Archer	British Guiana	DNS	
	Smiliana Dezulovic	Chile	DNS	
	Patricia Watts	Trinidad and Tobago	DNS	
