= Ángel Estrada =

Mexican footballer (born 2003)

Personal information
- Full name: Ángel Tadeo Estrada Meza
- Date of birth: 20 January 2003 (age 23)
- Place of birth: Hermosillo, Sonora, Mexico
- Height: 1.87 m (6 ft 2 in)
- Position: Attacking midfielder

Team information
- Current team: León
- Number: 30

Youth career
- 2018–2021: Sonora
- 2021–2024: Pachuca

Senior career*
Years	Team	Apps	(Gls)
2020–2021	Sonora	7	(0)
2021–2024	Pachuca	1	(0)
2024–	León	35	(2)
- * Club domestic league appearances and goals as of 5 September 2026

Ángel Tadeo Estrada Meza (born 20 January 2003) is a Mexican professional footballer who plays as an attacking midfielder for Liga MX club León.

== Club career ==
=== Sonora / Pachuca ===
Estrada began his career in the academy of Sonora, where he made his debut as a professional on 27 October 2020 in a 2–0 win against Tepatitlán, being subbed in at the 86th minute.

On 19 May 2021, Estrada signed with Pachuca, where he played in one game, a 2–0 victory against Santos Laguna on 21 April 2024, being subbed in at the 90th minute.

=== León ===
In June 2024, Estrada signed with León, making his debut for the team on 15 September in a 1–2 loss to Cruz Azul where he was subbed in at the 71st minute and on 26 October scored his first goal as a professional in a 4–0 win against Querétaro

On 31 March 2026, Estrada suffered a tibia fracture in practice and missed the remaining of the 2025–26 Liga MX season after getting surgery.

== Career statistics ==
=== Club ===
As of 5 September 2026

Club	Season	League			Cup		Continental		Intercontinental		Other		Total	
Club	Season	Division	Apps	Goals	Apps	Goals	Apps	Goals	Apps	Goals	Apps	Goals	Apps	Goals
Sonora	2020–21	Liga de Expansión MX	7	0	—		—		—		—		7	0
Pachuca	2023–24	Liga MX	1	0	—		—		—		—		1	0
León	2024–25	Liga MX	23	2	—		—		—		—		23	2
León	2025–26	Liga MX	12	0	—		—		—		2 (Note: Appearances in Leagues Cup)	0	14	0
León	Total		35	2	—		—		—		2	0	37	2
Career total			43	2	0	0	0	0	0	0	2	0	45	2
