= María Elena Sarría =

Cuban shot putter

Medal record

Women's athletics

Representing Cuba

Pan American Games
Gold medal – first place	1975 Mexico City	Shot put
Gold medal – first place	1979 San Juan	Shot put
Gold medal – first place	1983 Caracas	Shot put
Silver medal – second place	1987 Indianapolis	Shot put

María Elena Sarría Díaz (born September 14, 1954, in Cienfuegos) is a retired Cuban athlete who competed in the shot put during her career. Her personal best throw was 20.61 metres, and with 19.34 metres she still holds the Pan American Games record in the event.

== International competitions ==
Year	Competition	Venue	Position	Notes
Representing Cuba
1974	Central American and Caribbean Games	Santo Domingo, Dominican Republic	1st	14.60 m
1975	Pan American Games	Mexico City, Mexico	1st	18.03 m = CR
1976	Olympic Games	Montreal, Canada	11th	16.31 m
1979	Pan American Games	San Juan, Puerto Rico	1st	18.81 m = CR
1980	Olympic Games	Moscow, Soviet Union	9th	19.37 m
1981	Central American and Caribbean Championships	Santo Domingo, Dominican Republic	1st	18.28 m
1982	Central American and Caribbean Games	Havana, Cuba	1st	19.36 m
1983	Pan American Games	Caracas, Venezuela	1st	19.34 m =CR
1983	World Championships	Helsinki, Finland	8th	19.47 m
1987	Pan American Games	Indianapolis, United States	2nd	18.12 m
