= Athletics at the 1951 Pan American Games – Men's javelin throw =

Men's javelin throw at the Pan American Games

The men's javelin throw event at the 1951 Pan American Games was held at the Estadio Monumental in Buenos Aires on 3 March. 15 nations took part in the event with 243 athletes participating in 33 events.

== Results ==
Rank	Name	Nationality	Distance (m)
1st place, gold medalist(s)	Ricardo Héber	Argentina	68.08
2nd place, silver medalist(s)	Steve Seymour	United States	67.08
3rd place, bronze medalist(s)	Horst Walter	Argentina	66.33
4	Gerardo Mielke	Argentina	64.94
5	Hernán Ortiz	Paraguay	46.89
	Armin Nevermann	Chile	DNS
