= Tom Dooley (race walker) =

American racewalker

Thomas Robert Dooley (born December 9, 1945, in San Francisco, California) is an American racewalker who competed in the 1968 Summer Olympics and in the 1972 Summer Olympics.
