= Eladio Campos =

Mexican racewalker

Eladio Campos Alemán (born 20 February 1936) is a Mexican former racewalker who competed in the 1968 Summer Olympics.
