= Athletics at the 1975 Pan American Games – Men's discus throw =

Men's discus throw at the Pan American Games

The men's discus throw event at the 1975 Pan American Games was held in Mexico City on 15 October.

== Results ==
Rank	Name	Nationality	#1	#2	#3	#4	#5	#6	Result	Notes
1st place, gold medalist(s)	John Powell	United States	59.30	55.38	62.36	55.88	–	62.22	62.36	
2nd place, silver medalist(s)	Julián Morrinson	Cuba	56.76	59.04	58.32	58.22	57.98	59.88	59.88	
3rd place, bronze medalist(s)	Jay Silvester	United States	59.78	x	59.06	x	59.82	58.10	59.82	
4	Bishop Dolegiewicz	Canada	x	58.56	x				58.56	
5	Ain Roost	Canada	55.50	56.62	x	56.46	x	56.32	56.62	
6	Javier Moreno	Cuba	55.44	x	54.98	x	55.24	56.52	56.52	
7	José Carlos Jacques	Brazil							51.06	
8	Pedro Serrano	Puerto Rico							47.80	
