= Goetz Klopfer =

American racewalker

Personal information
- Born: June 25, 1942 (age 84) Merseburg, Germany
Medal record
Men's athletics
Representing the United States
Pan American Games
Gold medal – first place	1971 Cali	20km Walk
Bronze medal – third place	1967 Winnipeg	50km Walk

Goetz Heinrich Klopfer (born June 25, 1942, in Merseburg, Germany) was a male race walker, who represented the United States at two Summer Olympics, starting in 1968. His best finish was the 10th place in the men's 50 km walk at the 1968 Summer Olympics in Mexico City. He won the 20 km event at the 1971 Pan American Games.
