= Allen James =

American race walker

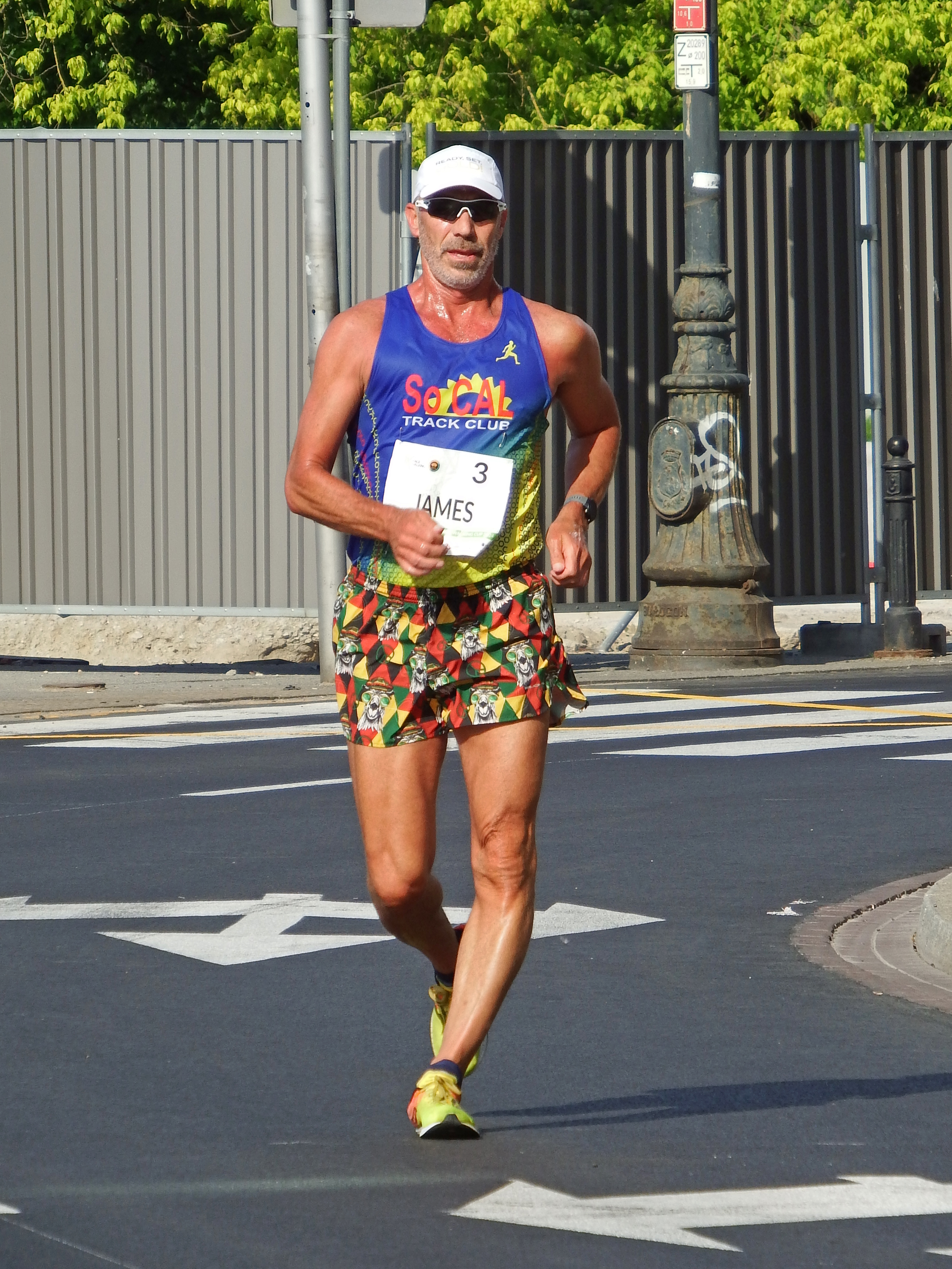
- Allen James (Korzeniowski Warsaw Race Walking Cup 2024)

Personal information
- Nationality: American
- Born: April 14, 1964 (age 62)

Sport
- Sport: Athletics
- Event: Racewalking

Allen James (born April 14, 1964) is an American racewalker. He competed in two Olympic Games: the 1992 Barcelona Olympics in the 20 km walk and the 1996 Atlanta Olympics in the 50 km walk.

He set five American records in the span 7 months from the fall of 1993 to the spring of 1994: 20,000m (track), 25,000m (track), 2 Hour (track), 30 km (road) and 50 km (road).
