= Athletics at the 1975 Pan American Games – Women's shot put =

Women's shot put at the Pan American Games

The women's shot put event at the 1975 Pan American Games was held in Mexico City on 16 October.

== Results ==
Rank	Name	Nationality	#1	#2	#3	#4	#5	#6	Result	Notes
1st place, gold medalist(s)	María Elena Sarría	Cuba	17.60	18.03	17.72	17.62	17.80	17.46	18.03	=GR
2nd place, silver medalist(s)	Hilda Ramírez	Cuba	x	17.28	16.93	16.20	16.68	16.38	17.28	
3rd place, bronze medalist(s)	Lucette Moreau	Canada	16.96	15.88	16.70	15.93	x	x	16.96	
4	Maureen Dowds	Canada	14.94	15.90	16.46	15.92	15.74	16.36	16.46	
5	Maren Seidler	United States	16.06	16.34	16.02	16.24	15.70	16.20	16.34	
6	Mary Jacobson	United States							14.96	
7	Maria Boso	Brazil							14.40	
8	Orlanda Lynch	Suriname							12.70	
9	Lisbeth Matzdorf	Guatemala							10.52	
