= Bill Burke (athlete) =

American middle-distance runner (born 1969)

Personal information
- Born: October 15, 1969 (age 56) San Antonio, Texas, United States

Sport
- Sport: Track and field
Medal record
Representing United States
Pan American Games
Silver medal – second place	1991 Havana	1500m
Summer Universiade
Silver medal – second place	1993 Buffalo	1500m

Bill Burke (born October 15, 1969, in San Antonio, Texas) is a retired male middle-distance runner from the United States, who competed in the 1980s and the early 1990s for his native country. He set his personal best in the men's 1,500 metres event (3:35.74) in August 1993 at a meet in Cologne.

Burke competed for the Princeton Tigers track and field team in the NCAA. He was the first Princeton runner to ever run a sub-four-minute mile.
