= Adalberto Scorza =

Argentine racewalker

Personal information
- Full name: Adalberto Enrique Scorza
- Nationality: Argentine
- Born: 2 March 1938 (age 88)
- Height: 1.66 m (5 ft 5 in)
- Weight: 60 kg (132 lb)

Sport
- Sport: Athletics
- Event: Racewalking

Adalberto Enrique Scorza (born 2 March 1938) is an Argentine racewalker. He competed in the men's 50 kilometres walk at the 1972 Summer Olympics.

== Personal bests ==
- 50 kilometres walk – 4:42:42 (1972)
