= Carlos Vanegas =

Nicaraguan racewalker

Personal information
- Full name: Carlos Enrique Vanegas Munguia
- Nationality: Nicaraguan
- Born: 3 November 1945 (age 80) Managua, Nicaragua
- Height: 1.68 m (5 ft 6 in)
- Weight: 55 kg (121 lb)

Sport
- Sport: Athletics
- Event: Racewalking

Carlos Enrique Vanegas Munguia (born 3 November 1945) is a Nicaraguan racewalker. He competed in the men's 20 kilometres walk at the 1968 Summer Olympics.

== Personal bests ==
- 20 kilometres walk – 1:44:59 (1970)
