= Don Bertoia =

Canadian middle-distance runner

Personal information
- Full name: Donald Richard Bertoia
- Born: February 16, 1940 (age 86) Rossland, British Columbia, Canada
- Height: 173 cm (5 ft 8 in)
- Weight: 70 kg (154 lb)
Medal record
Men's athletics
Representing Canada
Pan American Games
Gold medal – first place	1963 Sao Paulo	800 metres
Bronze medal – third place	1963 Sao Paulo	1500 metres

Donald Richard Bertoia (born February 16, 1940, in Rossland, British Columbia) is a retired middle distance runner from Canada. He competed for Canada at the 1962 British Empire and Commonwealth Games in the men's 1 mile, 4 × 440 yard relay, and 880 yard events. Bertoia represented his native country in the men's 800 metres at the 1964 Summer Olympics in Tokyo, Japan. A resident of Vancouver, British Columbia, he claimed the gold medal in the same event and a bronze medal in the 1500 metres at the 1963 Pan American Games in Brazil.

Bertoia competed for the Washington State Cougars track and field team in the NCAA.
