= Ernesto Alfaro =

Colombian racewalker

Personal information
- Full name: Ernesto Alfaro Bermúdez
- Nationality: Colombian
- Born: 10 March 1946 (age 79)
- Height: 1.65 m (5 ft 5 in)
- Weight: 68 kg (150 lb)

Sport
- Sport: Athletics
- Event: Racewalking

Ernesto Alfaro Bermúdez (born 10 March 1946) is a Colombian racewalker. He competed in the men's 20 kilometres walk at the 1976 Summer Olympics and the 1980 Summer Olympics.

== Personal bests ==
- 20 kilometres walk – 1:29:00 (1974)
- 50 kilometres walk – 4:18:08 (1978)
