= Ron Laird =

American racewalker

Personal information
- Born: May 31, 1938 (age 88)
Medal record
Men's Athletics
Representing the United States
Pan American Games
Gold medal – first place	1967 Winnipeg	20km Walk

Ronald Owen Laird (born May 31, 1938, in Louisville, Kentucky) was a race walker from the United States, who competed for the New York Athletic Club. He represented his native country at four Olympiads. His best finish was 19th place in the men's 50 km walk at the 1960 Summer Olympics in Rome, Italy. He won the 20 km event at the 1967 Pan American Games, and finished 25th in that event in the Mexico City 1968 Summer Olympics and 20th in the Montreal 1976 Summer Olympics, but was disqualified in the 1964 Summer Olympics event in Tokyo.
