= Felix Cappella =

Canadian race walker (1930–2011)

Personal information
- Born: January 24, 1930 Fara Sabina
- Died: February 26, 2011 (aged 81) Newmarket, Ontario
Medal record
Men's Athletics
Representing Canada
Pan American Games
Silver medal – second place	Winnipeg 1967	50km Walk
Bronze medal – third place	Winnipeg 1967	20km Walk

Felix Cappella (January 24, 1930 – February 26, 2011) was a race walker from Canada, who represented Canada at the 1968 Summer Olympics in Mexico City. He won the silver medal at the 50 km event at the 1967 Pan American Games, and bronze in the 20 km race.
