= Larry Young (race walker) =

American racewalker

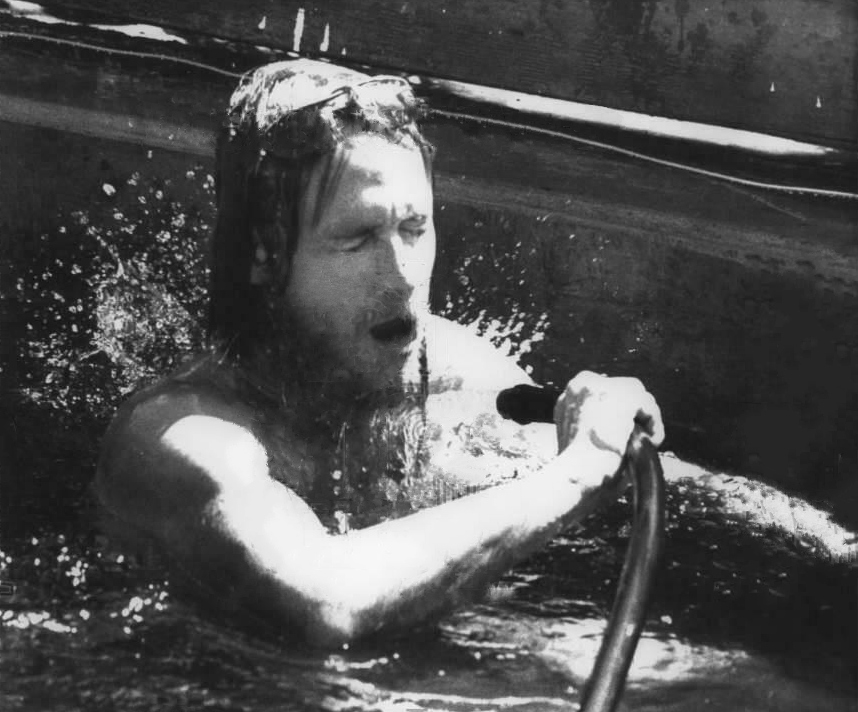
- Young bathing in the steeplechase pool after winning the 50 km race at the 1972 Olympic Trials

Personal information
- Born: February 10, 1943 (age 83) Independence, Missouri, U.S.
- Height: 178 cm (5 ft 10 in)
- Weight: 67 kg (148 lb)

Sport
- Sport: Athletics
- Event: Racewalking
- Club: Mid-America Track Club, Kansas City

Achievements and titles
- Personal best(s): 20 km – 1:30:10 (1974); 50 km – 4:00:46 (1972)
Medal record
Representing the United States
Olympic Games
Bronze medal – third place	1968 Mexico City	50 km walk
Bronze medal – third place	1972 Munich	50 km walk
Pan American Games
Gold medal – first place	1967 Winnipeg	50 km walk
Gold medal – first place	1971 Cali	50 km walk

Lawrence Dean Young (born February 10, 1943) is an American racewalker. He had his best results in the 50 km distance, winning bronze medals at the 1968 and 1972 Olympics and gold medals at the 1967 and 1971 Pan American Games. Young is the only American to ever win a medal in long distance racewalking.

Young graduated from Columbia College (Missouri), where he attended on the only racewalking scholarship given in the United States.

Young is an accomplished sculptor who has placed over 50 monumental outdoor sculptures nationally and abroad. Most of his work has been in bronze, but he also works with stainless steel, marble, and other materials. He owns and operates a full-scale, 6,000-square-foot (560 m^{2}) foundry where he personally creates and produces most of his work. He also has works on display with the Art of the Olympians.
