= Estadio Sixto Escobar =

Multi-purpose stadium in San Juan, Puerto Rico

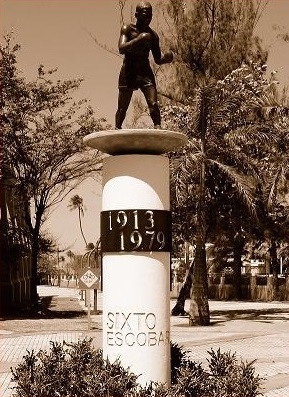
- Statue of Sixto Escobar at the stadium
- Interactive map of Estadio Sixto Escobar
- Location: Avenida Muñoz Rivera; Puerta de Tierra; San Juan, Puerto Rico 00901
- Coordinates: 18°27′55″N 66°5′20″W
- Capacity: 9,400

Construction
- Opened: November 12, 1935

Tenants
- Cincinnati Reds (Spring Training) (NL) (1936); Miami Marlins (IL) (1961); Copa de Puerto Rico (2000); River Plate Puerto Rico (USL Pro) (2011)
- Estadio Sixto Escobar
- U.S. Historic district – Contributing property
- Part of: Puerta de Tierra Historic District (ID100002936)
- Designated CP: October 15, 2019

Estadio Sixto Escobar is a multi-purpose stadium in San Juan, Puerto Rico. The stadium was named after boxer Sixto Escobar, the first champion of Puerto Rico, in 1938.

Originally built as a baseball venue, the stadium then became a frequent venue for football matches. In 1979, it was one of the three stadiums that served for the VIII Pan American Games held in San Juan. Nowadays, Sixto Escobar Stadium is the current home venue for C.A. San Juan.

== History ==
The stadium was inaugurated on November 12, 1932. Originally it was a baseball venue, and was built in an area then administrated by the U.S. Army. By the 1940s, a sector of the stadium, behind the baseball pitch, began to be used by some football enthusiasts. They played in a 100-metre length field known as canódromo (a track used for sighthound races). Some of the most notable Puerto Rican footballers of those times, started playing there.

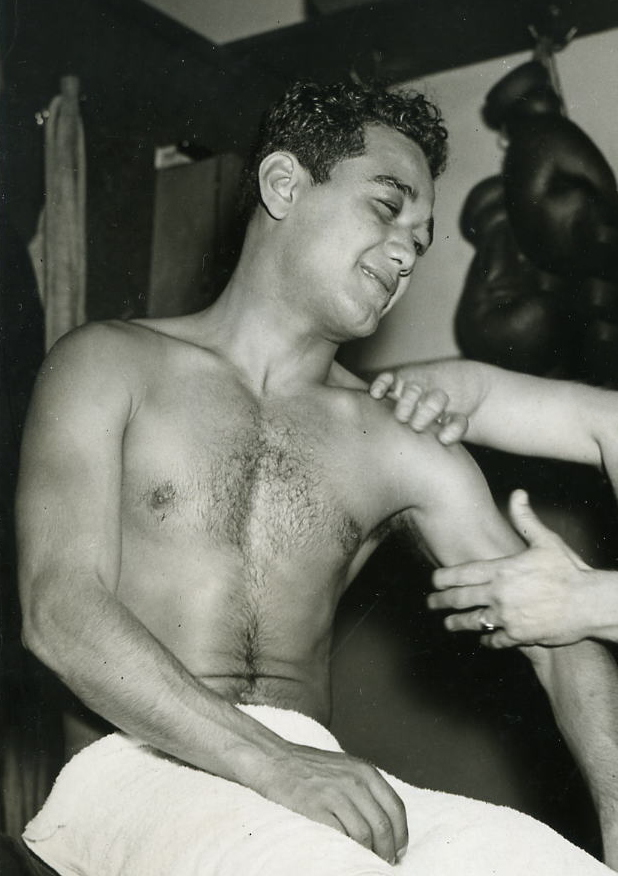
Boxer Sixto Escobar, in honor of whom the stadium was named in 1938

In baseball, the Cincinnati Reds conducted spring training at the stadium in 1935 and 1936. In April 1938, the Legislative Assembly of Puerto Rico voted to name the stadium and surrounding park in honor of Sixto Escobar, a Puerto Rican professional boxer who became Puerto Rico's first world champion. A statue of Escobar stands on the grounds.

The Miami Marlins were transferred to San Juan for the 1961 season and opened the season at Sixto Escobar Stadium. Attendance was poor and the team was moved to Charleston, WV on May 19, 1961. The Cangrejeros de Santurce of the professional Liga de Béisbol Profesional Roberto Clemente moved out to the newly constructed Hiram Bithorn Stadium in 1962.

By the 1970s the Sixto Escobar Stadium consolidated its predominance as a Puerto Rican football venue. In 1976 it was refurbished to host the 1976 CONCACAF U-20 Tournament, that also served as qualification for the 1977 FIFA World Youth Championship. Mexico and Honduras played the final at Sixto Escobar stadium on October 6. Likewise, many events of the 1979 Pan American Games were held at the stadium. On July 4, Puerto Rico beat Dominican Republic 1–0 in front of a full attendance.

In 1981, the stadium hosted the "Torneo 5 Estrellas", an international football tournament where Real Madrid, Millonarios, Pumas UNAM, a regional side of United States and local club Internacional de Puerto Rico participated. From the 1970s to early 2000s the stadium was a frequent venue of Puerto Rico national football team matches.

In 2000 the Sixto Escobar Stadium hosted all six matches of the inaugural Torneo de Copa de Puerto Rico. The Copa featured a mix of club and national teams and was hosted by the Puerto Rican Football Federation and the Puerto Rico national team. The international competition was played over the course of a week's time, consisting of three nights of double-headers. The MLS side, Tampa Bay Mutiny were the winners.

In 2011 the stadium was repaired and improved to accommodate the new tenant football team River Plate Puerto Rico, but the club never played there.

== See also ==
- Sixto Escobar
