= Marcel Jobin =

Canadian racewalker (born 1942)

Personal information
- Born: 3 January 1942 (age 84) Parent, Quebec, Canada

Sport
- Sport: Athletics
- Event: Racewalking
Medal record
Men's athletics
Representing Canada
Commonwealth Games
Silver medal – second place	1982 Brisbane	30 km Walk

Marcel Jobin (born 3 January 1942) is a Canadian racewalker. He competed in the men's 20 kilometres walk at the 1976 Summer Olympics and the 1984 Summer Olympics.
