= 1987 European Athletics Indoor Championships – Men's 5000 metres walk =

The men's 5000 metres walk event at the 1987 European Athletics Indoor Championships was held on 21 and 22 February.

== Medalists ==
Gold	Silver	Bronze
Jozef Pribilinec; Czechoslovakia	Ronald Weigel; East Germany	Roman Mrázek; Czechoslovakia

== Results ==
=== Heats ===
First 6 from each heat (Q) and the next 3 fastest (q) qualified for the semifinals.

Rank	Heat	Name	Nationality	Time	Notes
1	1	Sándor Urbanik	Hungary	19:14.64	Q
2	1	Erling Andersen	Norway	19:15.30	Q
3	1	Mikhail Shchennikov	Soviet Union	19:17.74	Q
4	1	Jacek Bednarek	Poland	19:20.66	Q
5	1	Carlo Mattioli	Italy	19:21.36	Q
6	1	Roman Mrázek	Czechoslovakia	19:22.35	Q
7	1	Miguel Ángel Prieto	Spain	19:26.73	q
8	1	Martial Fesselier	France	19:40.27	q
9	2	Jan Staaf	Sweden	20:08.08	Q
10	2	Zdzisław Szlapkin	Poland	20:08.12	Q
11	2	Walter Arena	Italy	20:08.17	Q
12	2	Jozef Pribilinec	Czechoslovakia	20:08.28	Q
13	2	Lyubomir Ivanov	Bulgaria	20:08.36	Q
14	2	Ronald Weigel	East Germany	20:08.48	Q
15	1	Christos Karagiorgos	Greece	20:18.13	q
16	2	Miguel Carvajal	Spain	20:18.59	
17	1	Hélder Oliveira	Portugal	20:19.70	
18	2	José Pinto	Portugal	20:20.06	
19	2	José Urbano	Portugal	20:22.92	
20	1	Philippe Burton	Belgium	21:21.98	
	2	Harold van Beek	Netherlands	DQ	
	2	Martin Toporek	Austria	DQ	
	2	Jos Martens	Belgium	DQ	

=== Final ===
Rank	Name	Nationality	Time	Notes
1st place, gold medalist(s)	Jozef Pribilinec	Czechoslovakia	19:08.44	CR
2nd place, silver medalist(s)	Ronald Weigel	East Germany	19:08.93	
3rd place, bronze medalist(s)	Roman Mrázek	Czechoslovakia	19:10.77	
4	Sándor Urbanik	Hungary	19:13.09	
5	Mikhail Shchennikov	Soviet Union	19:18.31	
6	Zdzisław Szlapkin	Poland	19:19.16	
7	Jan Staaf	Sweden	19:19.96	
8	Lyubomir Ivanov	Bulgaria	19:38.85	
9	Martial Fesselier	France	19:58.52	
10	Erling Andersen	Norway	20:03.02	
11	Miguel Ángel Prieto	Spain	20:11.12	
12	Christos Karagiorgos	Greece	20:33.58	
	Walter Arena	Italy	DQ	
	Carlo Mattioli	Italy	DQ	
	Jacek Bednarek	Poland	DQ	
