= 1991 IAAF World Indoor Championships – Men's 5000 metres walk =

The men's 5000 metres walk event at the 1991 IAAF World Indoor Championships was held on 8 and 10 March.

== Medalists ==
Gold	Silver	Bronze
Mikhail Shchennikov; Soviet Union	Giovanni De Benedictis; Italy	Frants Kostyukevich; Soviet Union

== Results ==
=== Heats ===
Rank	Heat	Name	Nationality	Time	Notes
1	1	Miguel Ángel Prieto	Spain	19:46.02	Q
2	1	Frants Kostyukevich	Soviet Union	19:46.27	Q
3	1	Igor Kollár	Czechoslovakia	19:46.52	Q
4	1	Ronald Weigel	Germany	19:48.79	Q
5	2	Giovanni De Benedictis	Italy	19:54.26	Q
6	2	Sándor Urbanik	Hungary	19:56.44	Q
7	2	Mikhail Shchennikov	Soviet Union	19:56.50	Q
8	2	Valentí Massana	Spain	19:57.49	Q
9	2	Bernd Gummelt	Germany	19:57.59	Q
10	1	Jimmy McDonald	Ireland	20:04.11	Q
11	2	Andrew Jachno	Australia	20:06.83	Q
12	1	Jefferson Pérez	Ecuador	20:19.91	Q, AR
	1	Nicholas A'Hern	Australia	DQ	
	1	Andrew Drake	Great Britain	DQ	
	1	Lyubomir Ivanov	Bulgaria	DQ	
	1	Stefan Johansson	Sweden	DQ	
	2	Nassir Hasnaoui	Morocco	DQ	
	2	Roman Mrázek	Czechoslovakia	DQ	
	2	Vladimir Ostrovskiy	Israel	DQ	
	2	José Urbano	Portugal	DQ	

=== Final ===
Rank	Name	Nationality	Time	Notes
1st place, gold medalist(s)	Mikhail Shchennikov	Soviet Union	18:23.55	WR
2nd place, silver medalist(s)	Giovanni De Benedictis	Italy	18:23.60	NR
3rd place, bronze medalist(s)	Frants Kostyukevich	Soviet Union	18:47.05	
4	Miguel Ángel Prieto	Spain	18:53.83	NR
5	Valentí Massana	Spain	19:08.79	
6	Sándor Urbanik	Hungary	19:11.85	
7	Bernd Gummelt	Germany	19:21.97	
8	Jimmy McDonald	Ireland	19:24.91	NR
9	Ronald Weigel	Germany	19:34.86	
10	Jefferson Pérez	Ecuador	20:20.05	
	Andrew Jachno	Australia	DQ	
	Igor Kollár	Czechoslovakia	DQ	
