= 5000 metres race walk =

Track race walking event

Athletics 5000 metres race walk

World records
- Men: (Italy) Francesco Fortunato 17:54.48 (2026).
- Women: (Ukraine) Lyudmyla Olyanovska 19:53.61 (2026)

The 5000 metres race walk is a racewalking event. The event is competed as a track race and was part of the athletics programme for men at the IAAF World Indoor Championships in Athletics until 1993. It is also an event in the World Masters Athletics Championships, and is a World record event.

Athletes must always keep in contact with the ground and the supporting leg must remain straight until the raised leg passes it. 5000 meters is 3.11 miles.

There is also an imperial analogue of the event, the 5 miles race walk, which has been held at the USA Outdoor Track and Field Championships.

== Records ==
IAAF just ratified world records for men's indoor marks. On February 28, 2026, Francesco Fortunato of Italy set the 5,000 m race walk world indoor record in Ancona in a time of 17:54.48. The all-time men's best outdoor mark is held by Gabriel Bordier of France, at 18:02.38. The all-time women's best 5,000 m race-walk mark was set indoor and is held by Lyudmyla Olyanovska of Ukraine, at 19:53.61. The all-time women's best outdoor mark is held by Eleonora Giorgi of Italy, at 20:01.80.

- Updated 21 May 2026.

Area	Time	Season	Athlete
World	17:54.48	2026	Francesco Fortunato (ITA)
Area records
Africa (records)	19:39.92	2018	Hédi Teraoui (TUN)
Asia (records)	19:14.00	1995	Sergey Korepanov (KAZ)
Europe (records)	17:54.48	2026	Francesco Fortunato (ITA)
North, Central America and Caribbean (records)	18:38.71	1987	Ernesto Canto (MEX)
Oceania (records)	18:52.20	1987	David Smith (AUS)
South America (records)	19:28.87	1993	Sérgio Galdino (BRA)

== All-time top 25 (outdoor) ==
- + = en route to 10,000 m performance
- h = hand timing

=== Men ===
- Correct as of April 2026.

Rank	Result	Athlete	Nationality	Date	Place	Ref.
1	18:02.38	Gabriel Bordier	France	10 June 2025	Montreuil	
2	18:05.49	Hatem Ghoula	Tunisia	1 May 1997	Tunis	
3	18:12.52	Declan Tingay	Australia	3 March 2023	Melbourne	
4	18:16.97	Ryo Hamanishi	Japan	18 May 2024	Kumagaya	
5	18:17.22	Robert Korzeniowski	Poland	3 July 1992	Reims	
6	18:18.01	Yohann Diniz	France	27 June 2008	Villeneuve d'Ascq	
7	18:20.14	Koki Ikeda	Japan	25 October 2020	Inzai	
8	18:22.02	Paul McGrath	Spain	25 May 2024	Barcelona	
9	18:24.97	Masatora Kawano	Japan	30 November 2025	Higashihiroshima	
10	18:26.70	Yuta Koga	Japan	25 October 2020	Inzai	
11	18:27.34	Francisco Javier Fernández	Spain	8 June 2007	Villeneuve d'Ascq	
12	18:28.47	Rhydian Cowley	Australia	24 February 2024	Melbourne	
13	18:28.80	Roman Mrázek	Slovakia	14 June 1989	Bratislava	
14	18:30.43	Maurizio Damilano	Italy	11 June 1992	Caserta	
15	18:31.76	Frants Kostyukevich	Belarus	7 February 1993	Villeneuve d'Ascq	
16	18:32.46	Erik Tysse	Norway	10 August 2007	Askim	
17	18:32.56	Perseus Karlström	Sweden	8 March 2019	Melbourne	
18	18:33.16	João Vieira	Portugal	10 May 2000	Rio Maior	
19	18:33.63	Kyle Swan	Australia	24 February 2024	Melbourne	
20	18:33.68	Evan Dunfee	Canada	2 June 2024	Coquitlam	
21	18:34.88	Toshikazu Yamanishi	Japan	19 September 2020	Kumagaya	
22	18:35.36	Eder Sánchez	Mexico	2 July 2014	Katowice	
23	18:36.84	Jozef Pribilinec	Slovakia	2 July 1993	Villeneuve d'Ascq	
24	18:37.22	Yusuke Suzuki	Japan	12 July 2015	Kitami	
25	18:37.60	Eiki Takahashi	Japan	12 July 2015	Kitami	

==== Notes ====
Below is a list of other times equal or superior to 18:37.60:

- Declan Tingay also walked 18:24.50 (2022).
- Robert Korzeniowski also walked 18:35.87 (1993).
- Yohann Diniz also walked 18:22.41 (2015), 18:33.32 (2013), 18:35.10 (2009), 18:35.10 (2010), 18:35.96 (2011).
- Masatora Kawano also walked 18:28.26 (2020).
- Erik Tysse also walked 18:37.17 (2009).

=== Women ===
- Correct as of April 2026.

Rank	Result	Athlete	Nationality	Date	Place	Ref.
1	20:01.80	Eleonora Giorgi	Italy	18 May 2014	Misterbianco	
2	20:02.60	Gillian O'Sullivan	Ireland	14 July 2002	Dublin	
3	20:03.04	Kerry Saxby-Junna	Australia	11 February 1996	Sydney	
4	20:07.52	Beate Gummelt	Germany	23 June 1990	Rostock	
5	20:11.45	Sabine Krantz	Germany	2 July 2005	Wattenscheid	
6	20:12.41	Elisabetta Perrone	Italy	2 August 2003	Rieti	
7	20:15.71	Lyudmyla Olyanovska	Ukraine	4 June 2014	Kyiv	
8	20:17.35	Jemima Montag	Australia	26 February 2022	Melbourne	
9	20:18.87	Melanie Seeger	Germany	10 July 2004	Braunschweig	
10	20:21.69	Annarita Sidoti	Italy	1 July 1995	Cesenatico	
11	20:22.06	Olivia Sandery	Australia	7 March 2026	Adelaide	
12	20:25.2 h	Ileana Salvador	Italy	5 April 1992	Barcelona	
13	20:28.05	Tatyana Kalmykova	Russia	12 July 2007	Ostrava	
14	20:28.17	María Pérez	Spain	30 April 2022	Andújar	
15	20:28.62	Sari Essayah	Finland	9 July 1994	Tuusula	
16	20:29.63	Claudia Stef	Romania	19 June 1999	Istanbul	
17	20:30.04	Júlia Takács	Spain	2 July 2014	Cáceres	
18	20:31.4 h	Irina Stankina	Russia	10 February 1996	Adler	
19	20:34.76	Hong Liu	China	16 September 2012	Tianjin	
20	20:35.38	Mary Luz Andía	Peru	16 August 2025	Lima	
21	20:36.2 h	Irina Petrova	Russia	19 June 2005	Saransk	
22	20:37.7 h	Jin Bingjie	China	3 March 1990	Hefei	
23	20:37.83	Kjersti Plätzer	Norway	7 July 2001	Drammen	
24	20:38.0 h	Chen Yueling	China	3 March 1990	Hefei	
25	20:38.2 h	Olga Kaniskina	Russia	19 June 2005	Saransk	

==== Notes ====
Below is a list of other times equal or superior to 20:38.2:

- Gillian O'Sullivan also walked 20:13.13 (2003).
- Kerry Saxby-Junna also walked 20:13.26 (1996), 20:17.19 (1990), 20:22.75 (1996), 20:30.0 (1993), 20:32.75 (1989), 20:33.21 (1995), 20:36.96 (1989), 20:38.14 (1993).
- Sabine Krantz also walked 20:27.47 (2004).
- Ileana Salvador also walked 20:27.59 (1989).
- Eleonora Giorgi also walked 20:31.46 (2016).
- Elisabetta Perrone also walked 20:33.42 (1995).
- Sari Essayah also walked 20:34.76 (1994).
- María Pérez also walked 20:36.31 (2023), 20:38.16 (2018).

== All-time top 25 (indoor) ==
- + = en route to 10,000 m performance
- h = hand timing

=== Men ===
- Correct as of April 2026.

Rank	Result	Athlete	Nationality	Date	Place	Ref.
1	17:54.48	Francesco Fortunato	Italy	28 February 2026	Ancona	
2	18:03.83	Sergey Shirobokov	Russia	10 March 2022	Yaroslavl	
3	18:04.76	Vasiliy Mizinov	Russia	10 March 2022	Yaroslavl	
4	18:07.08	Mikhail Shchennikov	Russia	14 February 1995	Moscow	
5	18:08.86	Ivano Brugnetti	Italy	17 February 2007	Ancona	
6	18:11.41	Ronald Weigel	Germany	13 February 1988	Wien	
7	18:15.25	Grigoriy Kornev	Russia	7 February 1992	Moskva	
8	18:15.54	Andrey Ruzavin	Russia	30 January 2014	Samara	
9	18:16.76	Yohann Diniz	France	7 December 201	Reims	
10	18:19.65	Gabriel Bordier	France	8 February 2025	Lyon	
11	18:19.97	Giovanni De Benedictis	Italy	28 February 1992	Genova	
12	18:20.97	Tom Bosworth	Great Britain	23 February 2020	Glasgow	
13	18:21.76	Ruslan Dmytrenko	Ukraine	30 January 2014	Samara	
14	18:22.25	Andreas Erm	Germany	25 February 2001	Dortmund	
15	18:22.77	Gianluca Picchiottino	Italy	28 February 2026	Ancona	
16	18:23.38	Rishat Shafikov	Russia	1 March 1997	Samara	
17	18:23.88	Frants Kostyukevich	Belarus	9 February 1991	Volgograd	
18	18:24.13	Francisco Javier Fernández	Spain	17 February 2007	Belfast	
19	18:27.15	Alessandro Gandellini	Italy	12 February 2000	Genova	
20	18:27.80	Jozef Pribilinec	Slovakia	7 March 1987	Indianapolis	
21	18:27.95	Stefan Johansson	Sweden	28 February 1992	Genova	
22	18:28.90	Roman Mrázek	Slovakia	5 March 1989	Budapest	
23	18:30.91	Aleksandr Yargunkin	Russia	7 January 2007	Yekaterinburg	
24	18:31.63	Vladimir Andreyev	Russia	7 February 1992	Moscow	
25	18:32.09	Robert Korzeniowski	Poland	21 February 1993	Spala	

==== Notes ====
Below is a list of other times equal or superior to 18:32.09:

- Francesco Fortunato also walked 17:55.65 (2025), 18:25.15 (2024).
- Mikhail Shchennikov also walked 18:15.91 (1989), 18:23.55 (1991), 18:27.10 (1989), 18:27.79 (1987).
- Grigoriy Kornev also walked 18:23.10 (1992).
- Ivano Brugnetti also walked 18:23.47 (2009).
- Giovanni De Benedictis also walked 18:23.60 (1991).
- Frants Kostyukevich also walked 18:25.40 (1992), 18:28.50 (1993), 18:30.87 (1992).
- Gabriel Bordier also walked 18:25.52 (2024).
- Andrey Ruzavin also walked 18:26.51 (2014).
- Tom Bosworth also walked 18:28.70 (2018).
- Yohann Diniz also walked 18:29.44 (2014).
- Vasiliy Mizinov also walked 18:28.3 (2021), 18:28.5 (2019).

=== Women ===
- Correct as of April 2026.

Rank	Result	Athlete	Nationality	Date	Place	Ref.
1	19:53.61	Lyudmyla Olyanovska	Ukraine	27 February 2026	Kyiv	
2	20:10.3 h	Vera Sokolova	Russia	30 December 2010	Saransk	
3	20:15.6 h	Yelena Lashmanova	Russia	30 December 2016	Saransk	
4	20:23.2 h	Yakaterina Ryzhova	Russia	30 December 2016	Saransk	
5	20:37.73	Margarita Turova	Belarus	2 February 2001	Minsk	
6	20:40.76	Olena Sobchuk	Ukraine	21 February 2025	Kyiv	
7	20:42.33	Yelena Gruzinova	Russia	1 March 1997	Samara	
8	20:44.25	Anna Lukyanova	Russia	23 February 2010	Volgograd	
9	20:48.0 h	Sabine Krantz	Germany	19 December 2006	Halle	
10	20:48.9 h	Sofiya Brodatskaya	Russia	30 December 2016	Saransk	
11	20:53.56	Kseniya Trifonova	Russia	23 February 2010	Volgograd	
12	20:55.80	Anna Terlyukevich	Belarus	22 February 2020	Mogilyov	
13	21:00.0 h	Tamara Kovalenko	Russia	23 January 2010	Moskva	
14	21:00.97	Ayşe Tekdal	Turkey	17 January 2021	Istanbul	
15	21:02.78	Olga Mikhaylova	Russia	23 February 2010	Volgograd	
16	21:04.8 h	Olimpiada Ivanova	Russia	23 January 2000	Moscow	
17	21:05.56	Meryem Bekmez	Turkey	17 January 2021	Istanbul	
18	21:05.79	Inna Kashyna	Ukraine	11 January 2019	Kyiv	
19	21:05.83	Daryia Paluektava	Belarus	22 February 2020	Mogilyov	
20	21:06.0 h	Natalya Shivireva	Russia	23 December 2006	Cheboksary	
21	21:06.92	Viktoryia Rashchupkina	Belarus	22 February 2020	Mogilyov	
22	21:11.04	Valentina Tsybulskaya	Belarus	26 February 1999	Minsk	
23	21:11.9 h	Tatyana Korotkova	Russia	6 January 2008	Chelyabinsk	
24	21:12.00	Irina Yumanova	Russia	12 January 2013	Novocheboksarsk	
25	21:14.8 h	Irina Petrova	Russia	25 December 2005	Moscow	

==== Notes ====
Below is a list of other times equal or superior to 21:14.8:

- Lyudmyla Olyanovska also walked 20:26.26 (2025), 20:40.40 (2025), 20:41.25 (2026), 20:50.56 (2024), 20:59.1 (2021), 21:04.90 (2013).
- Margarita Turava also walked 20:37.77 (2005).
- Yelena Lashmanova also walked 20:44.37 (2010).

== International medallists ==
=== African Championships ===
Championships	Gold	Silver	Bronze
1988 Annaba	Sabiha Mansouri (ALG)	Dalila Frihi (ALG)	Kheïra Sadat (ALG)
1989 Lagos	Agnetha Chelimo (KEN)	Mercy Nyambura (KEN)	Only two finishers
1990 Cairo	Agnetha Chelimo (KEN)	Méryem Kouch (MAR)	Amani Mohamed Adel (EGY)
1992 Belle Vue Harel	Dounia Kara (ALG)	Maryse Pyndiah (MRI)	Susan Bingham (RSA)
1993 Durban	Dounia Kara (ALG)	Amsale Yakobe (ETH)	Felicita Falconer (RSA)
1996 Yaoundé	Dounia Kara (ALG)	Nagwa Ibrahim Ali (EGY)	Monica Akoth (KEN)
1998 Dakar	Nagwa Ibrahim Ali (EGY)	Dounia Kara (ALG)	Anne-Hortense Ebéna (CMR)
