= 1991 World Championships in Athletics – Men's 20 kilometres walk =

These are the official results of the Men's 20 km Walk event at the 1991 World Championships in Tokyo, Japan. There were a total number of 37 participating athletes, with the final held on Saturday August 24, 1991, with the start at 08:30h local time.

== Medalists ==
Gold	Maurizio Damilano; Italy (ITA)
Silver	Mikhail Shchennikov; Soviet Union (URS)
Bronze	Yevgeniy Misyulya; Soviet Union (URS)

== Abbreviations ==
- All times shown are in hours:minutes:seconds

DNS	did not start
NM	no mark
WR	world record
AR	area record
NR	national record
PB	personal best
SB	season best

== Records ==
Standing records prior to the 1991 World Athletics Championships
World Record	Pavol Blažek (TCH)	1:18.13	September 16, 1990	Hildesheim, Germany
Event Record	Maurizio Damilano (ITA)	1:20.45	August 30, 1987	Rome, Italy
Broken records during the 1991 World Athletics Championships
Event Record	Maurizio Damilano (ITA)	1:19.37	August 24, 1991	Tokyo, Japan

== Final ==
RANK	FINAL	TIME
	Maurizio Damilano (ITA)	1:19:37 CR
	Mikhail Shchennikov (URS)	1:19:46
	Yevgeniy Misyulya (URS)	1:20:22
4.	Giovanni De Benedictis (ITA)	1:20:29
5.	Valentí Massana (ESP)	1:20:29
6.	Robert Ihly (GER)	1:20:52
7.	Walter Arena (ITA)	1:21:01
8.	Li Mingcai (CHN)	1:21:15
9.	Thierry Toutain (FRA)	1:21:22
10.	Robert Korzeniowski (POL)	1:21:32
11.	Axel Noack (GER)	1:21:35
12.	Carlos Mercenario (MEX)	1:21:37
13.	Igor Kollár (TCH)	1:21:44
14.	Sándor Urbanik (HUN)	1:21:57
15.	Roman Mrazek (TCH)	1:22:03
16.	Ronald Weigel (GER)	1:22:18
17.	Pavol Blažek (TCH)	1:22:34
18.	José Urbano (POR)	1:23:09
19.	Héctor Moreno (COL)	1:23:27
20.	Nick A'Hern (AUS)	1:23:44
21.	Miguel Ángel Prieto (ESP)	1:24:06
22.	Tim Berrett (CAN)	1:24:10
23.	Vladimir Ostrovskiy (ISR)	1:24:35
24.	Marcelo Palma (BRA)	1:24:54
25.	Sérgio Galdino (BRA)	1:25:20
26.	Artur Shumak (URS)	1:25:22
27.	Ian McCombie (GBR)	1:25:30
28.	Gyula Dudás (HUN)	1:25:52
29.	Bobby O'Leary (IRL)	1:29:28
30.	Stefan Johansson (SWE)	1:29:47
31.	Tim Lewis (USA)	1:30:55
32.	Santiago Fonseca (HON)	1:38:36
—	Joel Sánchez (MEX)	DNF
—	Claudio Luiz Bertolino (BRA)	DNF
—	Guillaume LeBlanc (CAN)	DSQ
—	Daniel Plaza (ESP)	DSQ
—	Hirofumi Sakai (JPN)	DSQ

== See also ==
- 1990 Men's European Championships 20km Walk (Split)
- 1991 Race Walking Year Ranking
- 1992 Men's Olympic 20km Walk (Barcelona)
- 1993 Men's World Championships 20km Walk (Stuttgart)
