= Spain at the World Athletics Championships =

- WA code: ESP
- National federation: Real Federación Española de Atletismo
- Website: www.rfea.es
- Medals Ranked 19th: Gold 13 Silver 19 Bronze 17 Total 49

World Athletics Championships appearances (overview)
- 1976; 1980; 1983; 1987; 1991; 1993; 1995; 1997; 1999; 2001; 2003; 2005; 2007; 2009; 2011; 2013; 2015; 2017; 2019; 2022; 2023; 2025

Spain has participated in every World Athletics Championships since the beginning in 1983.

== Medalists ==
Medal	Name	Year	Event
Silver	José Marín	1983 Helsinki	Men's 50 km walk
Silver	José Luis González	1987 Rome	Men's 1500 m
Bronze	José Marín	1987 Rome	Men's 20 km walk
Bronze	Sandra Myers	1991 Tokyo	Women's 400 m
Silver	Fermín Cacho	1993 Stuttgart	Men's 1500 m
Gold	Valentí Massana	1993 Stuttgart	Men's 20 km walk
Bronze	Daniel Plaza	1993 Stuttgart	Men's 20 km walk
Gold	Jesús Ángel García Bragado	1993 Stuttgart	Men's 50 km walk
Bronze	Encarna Granados	1993 Stuttgart	Women's 10 km walk
Gold	Martín Fiz	1995 Gothenburg	Men's Marathon
Silver	Valentí Massana	1995 Gothenburg	Men's 20 km walk
Silver	Fermín Cacho	1997 Athens	Men's 1500 m
Bronze	Reyes Estévez	1997 Athens	Men's 1500 m
Gold	Abel Antón	1997 Athens	Men's Marathon
Silver	Martín Fiz	1997 Athens	Men's Marathon
Silver	Jesús Ángel García Bragado	1997 Athens	Men's 50 km walk
Bronze	Reyes Estévez	1999 Sevilla	Men's 1500 m
Gold	Abel Antón	1999 Sevilla	Men's Marathon
Silver	Yago Lamela	1999 Sevilla	Men's Long jump
Gold	Niurka Montalvo	1999 Sevilla	Women's Long jump
Silver	Jesús Ángel García Bragado	2001 Edmonton	Men's 50 km walk
Silver	Marta Domínguez	2001 Edmonton	Women's 5000 m
Bronze	Niurka Montalvo	2001 Edmonton	Women's Long jump
Silver	Julio Rey	2003 Saint-Denis	Men's Marathon
Bronze	Eliseo Martín	2003 Saint-Denis	Men's 3000 m steeplechase
Silver	Paquillo Fernández	2003 Saint-Denis	Men's 20 km walk
Bronze	Yago Lamela	2003 Saint-Denis	Men's long jump
Silver	Marta Domínguez	2003 Saint-Denis	Women's 5000 m
Silver	Paquillo Fernández	2005 Helsinki	Men's 20 km walk
Bronze	Juan Manuel Molina	2005 Helsinki	Men's 20 km walk
Silver	Paquillo Fernández	2007 Osaka	Men's 20 km walk
Bronze	Mayte Martínez	2007 Osaka	Women's 800 m
Bronze	María Vasco	2007 Osaka	Women's 20 km walk
Silver	Jesús Ángel García Bragado	2009 Berlin	Men's 50 km walk
Bronze	Natalia Rodríguez	2011 Daegu	Women's 1500 m
Silver	Miguel Ángel López	2013 Moscow	Men's 20 km walk
Silver	Ruth Beitia	2013 Moscow	Women's High Jump
Gold	Miguel Ángel López	2015 Beijing	Men's 20 km walk
Bronze	Orlando Ortega	2019 Doha	Men's 110 m hurdles
Bronze	Mohamed Katir	2022 Eugene	Men's 1500 m
Bronze	Asier Martínez	2022 Eugene	Men's 110 m hurdles
Gold	Álvaro Martín	2023 Budapest	Men's 20 km walk
Gold	María Pérez	2023 Budapest	Women's 20 km walk
Gold	Álvaro Martín	2023 Budapest	Men's 35 km walk
Gold	María Pérez	2023 Budapest	Women's 35 km walk
Silver	Mohamed Katir	2023 Budapest	Men's 5000 m
Gold	María Pérez	2025 Tokyo	Women's 35 km walk
Gold	María Pérez	2025 Tokyo	Women's 20 km walk
Bronze	Paul McGrath	2025 Tokyo	Men's 20 km walk

== Medal tables ==
=== By championships ===
Games	Gold	Silver	Bronze	Total
1983 Helsinki	0	1	0	1
1987 Rome	0	1	1	2
1991 Tokyo	0	0	1	1
1993 Stuttgart	2	1	2	5
1995 Gothenburg	1	1	0	2
1997 Athens	1	3	1	5
1999 Sevilla	2	1	1	4
2001 Edmonton	0	2	1	3
2003 Saint-Denis	0	3	2	5
2005 Helsinki	0	1	1	2
2007 Osaka	0	1	2	3
2009 Berlin	0	1	0	1
2011 Daegu	0	0	1	1
2013 Moscow	0	2	0	2
2015 Beijing	1	0	0	1
2017 London	0	0	0	0
2019 Doha	0	0	1	1
2022 Eugene	0	0	2	2
2023 Budapest	4	1	0	5
2025 Tokyo	2	0	1	3
Totals (20 entries)	13	19	17	49

=== By event ===
Event	Gold	Silver	Bronze	Total
20 km walk	5	5	5	15
Marathon	3	2	0	5
35 km walk	3	0	0	3
50 km walk	1	4	0	5
Long jump	1	1	2	4
1500 m	0	3	4	7
5000 m	0	3	0	3
High jump	0	1	0	1
110 m hurdles	0	0	2	2
10 km walk	0	0	1	1
3000 m steeplechase	0	0	1	1
400 m	0	0	1	1
800 m	0	0	1	1
Totals (13 entries)	13	19	17	49

== Doping ==
Marta Domínguez finished in first position in the 3000 metres steeplechase in 2009 World Athletics Championship held in Berlin ahead Yuliya Zarudneva from Russia and Milcah Chemos Cheywa of Kenya, but she was disqualified and stripped her gold medal in November 2015 .The Court of Arbitration for Sport found Domínguez guilty of an anti-doping rule violation and ordered that all competitive results obtained by Domínguez from 5 August 2009 be disqualified. .

Stripped medals

Championship	Event	Rank	Name	Time	Notes	Reason
2009 Berlin	3000 m steeplechase	1st place, gold medalist(s)	~~Marta Domínguez~~	~~9:07.32~~	~~WL, NR~~	DQ, Doping violation

== Reassigned Medals ==
Jesús Ángel García Bragado finished in third position in the 50 km walk race in the 2009 World Athletics Championship held in Berlin behind Sergey Kirdyapkin of Russia and Trond Nymark of Norway. On January 15, 2015, Kirdyapkin was disqualified for a doping violation so Jesús Ángel García Bragado was awarded the silver medal.

Ruth Beitia finished in third position (shared with Anna Chicherova of Russia) in the high jump in the 2013 World Championships held in Moscow behind Svetlana Shkolina of Russia and Brigetta Barrett of the United States. Shkolina was disqualified for a doping violation and Ruth Beitia was awarded the silver medal.

Miguel Ángel López finished in third position in the 20 km walk in the 2013 World Championships held in Moscow behind Aleksandr Ivanov of Russia and Chen Ding of the China. Ivanov was disqualified for a doping violation and Miguel Ángel López was awarded the silver medal.

Championship	Event	Rank after reassignment	Name	Initial rank
2009 Berlin	50 km walk	2nd place, silver medalist(s)	Jesús Ángel García Bragado	3rd place, bronze medalist(s)
2013 Moscow	High Jump	2nd place, silver medalist(s)	Ruth Beitia	3rd place, bronze medalist(s)
2013 Moscow	20 km walk	2nd place, silver medalist(s)	Miguel Ángel López	3rd place, bronze medalist(s)
