= 20,000 metres race walk =

Long-distance track walking race over 20,000 metres

Athletics 20,000 metres walk

World records
- Men: Bernardo Segura (MEX) 1:17:25.6 (1994)
- Women: Olimpiada Ivanova (RUS) 1:26.53.2 (2001)

The 20,000 metres race walk is a racewalking event. The event is competed as a track race. Athletes must always keep in contact with the ground and the supporting leg must remain straight until the raised leg passes it. 20,000 metres is 12.4274 miles.

== History ==
This distance is not commonly raced at high level international competitions but part of South American Championships in Athletics and individual national championships (f.e. Russia, India, Colombia, Venezuela). Top level senior athletics racewalking events typically feature 20 km road distance.

== World records ==
On May 7, 1994, Bernardo Segura of Mexico set a new 20,000 m race walk world record in Fana in a time of 1:17:25.6. The all-time women's 20,000 m race-walk record is held by Olimpiada Ivanova of Russia, at 1:26:53.2.

== All-time top 25 (outdoor) ==
=== Men ===
- Correct as of August 2025.

Rank	Result	Athlete	Nationality	Date	Place	Ref.
1	1:17:25.6 (Note: actually 1:17:25.5 but ratified as 1:17:25.6)	Bernardo Segura	Mexico	7 May 1994	Fana	
2	1:18:35.2	Stefan Johansson	Sweden	15 May 1992	Fana	
3	1:18:37.9 h	Caio Bonfim	Brazil	31 July 2025	São Paulo	
4	1:18.40.0	Ernesto Canto	Mexico	5 May 1994	Fana	
5	1:19:18.3	Ronald Weigel	Germany	26 May 1990	Fana	
6	1:19:22.5	Aleksey Pershin	Russia	7 May 1988	Fana	
7	1:19:24.1	Walter Arena	Italy	26 May 1990	Fana	
8	1:19:42.0	Yohann Diniz	France	25 May 2014	Bogny-sur-Meuse	
9	1:19:48.1	Nathan Deakes	Australia	4 September 2001	Brisbane	
10	1:19:52.0	Robert Korzeniowski	Poland	4 September 2001	Brisbane	
11	1:19:54.0	Pavol Blazek	Slovakia	26 May 1990	Fana	
12	1:19:54.7 h	Matheus Correa	Brazil	31 July 2025	São Paulo	
13	1:20:06.8	Daniel Bautista	Mexico	17 October 1979	Montréal	
14	1:20:11.72	Li Gaobo	China	2 November 2007	Wuhan	
15	1:20:12.3	Nick A'Hern	Australia	8 May 1993	Fana	
16	1:20:22.52	Gurmeet Singh	India	3 February 2012	Bhubaneswar	
17	1:20:23.8	Andrés Chocho	Ecuador	5 June 2011	Buenos Aires	
18	1:20:24.0 h	Max Goncalves dos Santos	Brazil	27 June 2024	Bragança Paulista	
19	1:20:24.4	Li Mingcai	China	15 March 1992	Jinan	
20	1:20:24.6	Li Zewen	China	24 October 1995	Nanjing	
21	1:20:31.5	Chen Shaoguo	China	15 March 1992	Jinan	
22	1:20:35.4	Mao Xinyuan	China	15 March 1992	Jinan	
23	1:20:36.6	Gustavo Restrepo	Colombia	5 June 2011	Buenos Aires	
24	1:20:36.7	Erling Andersen	Norway	5 May 1984	Fana	
24	1:20:36.7	Ernesto Canto	Mexico	26 May 1990	Fana	

==== Notes ====
Below is a list of other times equal or superior to 1:20:36.7:

- Caio Bonfim also walked 1:19:52.1 h (2024), 1:20:13.68 (2021).
- Nick A'Hern also walked 1:20:18.5 (1990).
- Max Goncalves dos Santos also walked 1:20:35.1 h (2025).

=== Women ===
- Correct as of August 2025.

Rank	Result	Athlete	Nationality	Date	Place	Ref.
1	1:26:53.2	Olimpiada Ivanova	Russia	6 September 2001	Brisbane	
2	1:27:49.3	Yelena Nikolayeva	Russia	6 September 2001	Brisbane	
3	1:29:24.61	Glenda Morejón	Ecuador	29 May 2021	Guayaquil	
4	1:29:32.4	Song Hongjuan	China	24 October 2003	Changsha	
5	1:29:36.4	Susana Feitor	Portugal	21 July 2001	Lisboa	
6	1:30:48.3	Rossella Giordano	Italy	4 August 2000	Almada	
7	1:30:51.97	Erica de Sena	Brazil	29 May 2021	Guayaquil	
8	1:30:52.0	Karla Jaramillo	Ecuador	25 May 2019	Lima	
9	1:30:52.7 h	Viviane Lyra	Brazil	31 July 2025	São Paulo	
10	1:31:02.25	Sandra Arenas	Colombia	13 June 2015	Lima	
11	1:31:06.6	Jiang Jing	China	24 October 2003	Changsha	
12	1:31:16.18	Liu Hong	China	1 November 2007	Wuhan	
13	1:31:18.79	Song Xiaoling	China	1 November 2007	Wuhan	
14	1:31:19.2	Maribel Goncalves	Portugal	31 July 2004	Lisboa	
15	1:31:23.7	Inês Henriques	Portugal	31 July 2004	Lisboa	
16	1:31:43.5	Marina Smyslova	Russia	25 September 2004	Izhevsk	
17	1:31:47.95	Bo Yanmin	China	1 November 2007	Wuhan	
18	1:31:49.5	Alena Zenkova	Russia	25 September 2004	Izhevsk	
19	1:31:52.30	Wang Shanshan	China	1 November 2007	Wuhan	
20	1:31:53.8	Mirna Ortíz	Guatemala	8 August 2014	Ciudad de Guatemala	
21	1:31:58.9	Lyudmila Arkhipova	Russia	25 September 2004	Izhevsk	
22	1:32:09.4	Ingrid Hernández	Colombia	5 June 2011	Buenos Aires	
23	1:32:15.1	Tatyana Sibileva	Russia	25 September 2004	Izhevsk	
24	1:32:17.6	Milángela Rosales	Venezuela	5 June 2011	Buenos Aires	
25	1:32:19.71	Hie Jingjing	China	1 November 2007	Wuhan	

==== Notes ====
Below is a list of other times equal or superior to 1:32:19.71:

- Sandra Arenas also walked 1:31:46.9 (2014).
- Marina Smyslova also walked 1:32:16.5 (2003).

== All-time top performance (indoor) ==
=== Men ===
Rank	Result	Athlete	Nationality	Date	Place	Ref.
1	1:20:40.0 OT	Ronald Weigel	East Germany	27 January 1980	Senftenberg	
