= 1995 World Championships in Athletics – Men's 20 kilometres walk =

These are the official results of the Men's 20 km Walk event at the 1995 World Championships held on Sunday 6 August 1995 in Gothenburg, Sweden. There were a total number of 46 participating athletes and two non-starters.

== Medalists ==
Gold	Michele Didoni; Italy (ITA)
Silver	Valentí Massana; Spain (ESP)
Bronze	Yevgeniy Misyulya; Belarus (BLR)

== Abbreviations ==
- All times shown are in hours:minutes:seconds

DNS	did not start
NM	no mark
WR	world record
AR	area record
NR	national record
PB	personal best
SB	season best

== Records ==
Standing records prior to the 1995 World Athletics Championships
World Record	Bu Lingtang (CHN)	1:18.04	April 7, 1994	Beijing, PR China
Event Record	Maurizio Damilano (ITA)	1:19.37	August 24, 1991	Tokyo, Japan

== Final ranking ==
Rank	Athlete	Time	Note
1st place, gold medalist(s)	Michele Didoni (ITA)	1:19:59	PB
2nd place, silver medalist(s)	Valentí Massana (ESP)	1:20:23	
3rd place, bronze medalist(s)	Yevgeniy Misyulya (BLR)	1:20:48	
4	Ilya Markov (RUS)	1:21:28	
5	Li Zewen (CHN)	1:21:39	
6	Mikhail Shchennikov (RUS)	1:22:16	
7	Denis Langlois (FRA)	1:22:21	PB
8	Igor Kollár (SVK)	1:22:30	
9	Mikhail Khmelnitskiy (BLR)	1:23:24	
10	Jean-Olivier Brosseau (FRA)	1:23:34	
11	Nicholas A'Hern (AUS)	1:23:45	
12	Nischan Daimer (GER)	1:24:17	
13	Héctor Moreno (COL)	1:24:34	
14	Robert Ihly (GER)	1:24:40	
15	Enrico Lang (ITA)	1:24:43	
16	Martin St. Pierre (CAN)	1:24:49	
17	José Urbano (POR)	1:26:10	
18	Stefan Johansson (SWE)	1:26:20	
19	Sérgio Galdino (BRA)	1:26:53	
20	Costică Bălan (ROM)	1:26:53	
21	Hubert Sonnek (CZE)	1:27:35	
22	Gyula Dudás (HUN)	1:28:08	
23	Chen Shaoguo (CHN)	1:28:13	
24	Magnus Morenius (SWE)	1:28:29	
25	Darrell Stone (GBR)	1:28:48	
26	Sverre Jensen (NOR)	1:29:35	
27	Roman Mrazek (SVK)	1:29:37	
28	Claudio Bertolino (BRA)	1:30:25	
29	Valeriy Borisov (KAZ)	1:31:22	
30	Hatem Ghoula (TUN)	1:32:17	
31	Scott Nelson (NZL)	1:32:19	
32	Valdas Kazlauskas (LTU)	1:33:54	
33	Jefferson Pérez (ECU)	1:34:20	
34	Htay Myint (MYA)	1:37:08	
35	Daisuke Ikeshima (JPN)	1:37:11	
DID NOT FINISH (DNF)
—	Fernando Vázquez (ESP)	DNF	
—	Alejandro López (MEX)	DNF	
—	Mariusz Ornoch (POL)	DNF	
—	Dmitriy Yesipchuk (RUS)	DNF	
—	Vladimir Ostrovskiy (ISR)	DNF	
—	Bernardo Segura (MEX)	DNF	
DISQUALIFIED (DSQ)
—	Giovanni De Benedictis (ITA)	DSQ	
—	Daniel Plaza (ESP)	DSQ	
—	Tomáš Kratochvíl (CZE)	DSQ	
—	Bu Lingtang (CHN)	DSQ	
—	Daniel García (MEX)	DSQ	
DID NOT START (DNS)
—	Vyacheslav Fedchuk (MDA)	DNS	
—	Allen James (USA)	DNS	

== See also ==
- 1992 Men's Olympic 20km Walk (Barcelona)
- 1993 Men's World Championships 20km Walk (Stuttgart)
- 1994 Men's European Championships 20km Walk (Helsinki)
- 1995 Race Walking Year Ranking
- 1996 Men's Olympic 20km Walk (Atlanta)
- 1997 Men's World Championships 20km Walk (Athens)
- 1998 Men's European Championships 20km Walk (Budapest)
