= Athletics at the 1996 Summer Olympics – Men's 20 kilometres walk =

Men's 20 kilometres walk at the Games of the XXVI Olympiad
- Venue: Centennial Olympic Stadium
- Date: July 26
- Competitors: 53 from 32 nations
- Winning time: 1:20:07

Medalists
1st place, gold medalist(s)		Jefferson Pérez; Ecuador
2nd place, silver medalist(s)		Ilya Markov; Russia
3rd place, bronze medalist(s)		Bernardo Segura; Mexico

These are the official results of the Men's 20 km Walk event at the 1996 Summer Olympics in Atlanta, Georgia.

Igor Kollár garnered a "huge lead" over the pack, but he was disqualified as the judges deemed that he held two feet off the ground. Kollár claimed that the judges only disqualified him because he was so far ahead and they wanted a closer finish, a claim disputed by his coach.

== Records ==
Standing records prior to the 1996 Summer Olympics
World Record	Bo Lingtang (CHN)	1:18:04	April 7, 1994	Beijing, PR China
Olympic Record	Jozef Pribilinec (TCH)	1:19:57	September 23, 1988	Seoul, South Korea

== Results ==
Rank	Athlete	Nation	Time	Time behind	Notes
1st place, gold medalist(s)	Jefferson Pérez	Ecuador	1:20:07		
2nd place, silver medalist(s)	Ilya Markov	Russia	1:20:16	+0:09	
3rd place, bronze medalist(s)	Bernardo Segura	Mexico	1:20:23	+0:16	
4	Nick A'Hern	Australia	1:20:31	+0:24	
5	Rishat Shafikov	Russia	1:20:41	+0:34	
6	Aigars Fadejevs	Latvia	1:20:47	+0:39	
7	Mikhail Shchennikov	Russia	1:21:09	+1:02	
8	Robert Korzeniowski	Poland	1:21:13	+1:06	
9	Yevgeniy Misyulya	Belarus	1:21:16	+1:09	
10	Thierry Toutain	France	1:21:56	+1:49	
11	Daniel Plaza	Spain	1:22:05	+1:58	
12	Mikhail Khmelnitskiy	Belarus	1:22:17	+2:10	
13	Sándor Urbanik	Hungary	1:22:18	+2:11	
14	Denis Langlois	France	1:23:08	+3:01	
15	Nischan Daimer	Germany	1:23:23	+3:16	
16	Giovanni Perricelli	Italy	1:23:41	+3:34	
17	Robert Ihly	Germany	1:23:47	+3:39	
18	Valeriy Borisov	Kazakhstan	1:23:52	+3:44	
19	Daniel García	Mexico	1:24:10	+4:03	
20	Valentí Massana	Spain	1:24:14	+4:07	
21	Yu Guohui	China	1:24:30	+4:23	
22	Daisuke Ikeshima	Japan	1:24:54	+4:47	
23	David Kimutai	Kenya	1:25:01	+4:54	
24	Andreas Erm	Germany	1:25:08	+5:01	
25	Jiří Malysa	Czech Republic	1:25:13	+5:06	
26	Sérgio Galdino	Brazil	1:25:14	+5:07	
27	Giovanni De Benedictis	Italy	1:25:22	+5:15	
28	Li Zewen	China	1:25:28	+5:21	
29	Claus Jørgensen	Denmark	1:25:28	+5:21	
30	Jan Staaf	Sweden	1:25:30	+5:23	
31	José Urbano	Portugal	1:25:32	+5:25	
32	Scott Nelson	New Zealand	1:25:50	+5:43	
33	Hatem Ghoula	Tunisia	1:25:52	+5:45	
34	Michele Didoni	Italy	1:26:02	+5:55	
35	Jean-Olivier Brosseau	France	1:26:29	+6:22	
36	Martin St. Pierre	Canada	1:26:37	+6:30	
37	Mohieddine Beni Daoud	Tunisia	1:27:15	+7:08	
38	Róbert Valíček	Slovakia	1:27:27	+7:20	
39	Fernando Vázquez	Spain	1:27:35	+7:28	
40	Justus Kavulanya	Kenya	1:27:49	+7:42	
41	Fedosei Ciumacenco	Moldova	1:27:57	+7:50	
42	Arturo Huerta	Canada	1:28:23	+8:16	
43	Luis Fernando García	Guatemala	1:28:28	+8:21	
44	Valdas Kazlauskas	Lithuania	1:28:33	+8:26	
45	Costică Bălan	Romania	1:28:36	+8:29	
46	Pavol Blažek	Slovakia	1:29:41	+9:34	
47	Dion Russell	Australia	1:30:04	+9:07	
48	Tomáš Kratochvíl	Czech Republic	1:30:11	+10:04	
49	Cláudio Bertolino	Brazil	1:31:04	+10:57	
50	Curt Clausen	United States	1:31:30	+11:23	
51	Jimmy McDonald	Ireland	1:32:11	+12:04	
52	Hubert Sonnek	Czech Republic	1:32:42	+12:35	
53	Htay Myint	Myanmar	1:42:28	+22:21	
—	Héctor Moreno	Colombia	DNF	–	
—	Igor Kollár	Slovakia	DSQ	–	
—	Li Mingcai	China	DSQ	–	
—	Julio René Martínez	Guatemala	DSQ	–	
—	Roberto Oscal	Guatemala	DSQ	–	
—	Miguel Rodríguez	Mexico	DSQ	–	
—	Julius Sawe	Kenya	DSQ	–	
—	Moussa Aouanouk	Algeria	DNS	–	

== See also ==
- 1993 Men's World Championships 20 km Walk (Stuttgart)
- 1994 Men's European Championships 20 km Walk (Helsinki)
- 1995 Men's World Championships 20 km Walk (Gothenburg)
- 1996 Race Walking Year Ranking
- 1997 Men's World Championships 20 km Walk (Athens)
- 1998 Men's European Championships 20 km Walk (Budapest)
- 1999 Men's World Championships 20 km Walk (Seville)
