= 1983 World Championships in Athletics – Men's 20 kilometres walk =

Marathon

These are the official results of the Men's 20 kilometres race walk event at the 1983 World Championships in Helsinki, Finland. The race was held on 7 August 1983.

== Medalists ==
Gold	Ernesto Canto; Mexico (MEX)
Silver	Jozef Pribilinec; Czechoslovakia (TCH)
Bronze	Yevgeniy Yevsyukov; Soviet Union (URS)

== Abbreviations ==
- All times shown are in hours:minutes:seconds

DNS	did not start
NM	no mark
WR	world record
AR	area record
NR	national record
PB	personal best
SB	season best

== Records ==
Standing records prior to the 1983 World Athletics Championships
World Record	Domingo Colin (MEX)	1:19.35	April 27, 1980	Cherkasy, Soviet Union
Event Record	New event			
Broken records during the 1983 World Athletics Championships
Event Record	Ernesto Canto (MEX)	1:20.49	August 7, 1983	Helsinki, Finland

== Final ranking ==
Rank	Athlete	Time	Note
1st place, gold medalist(s)	Ernesto Canto (MEX)	1:20:49	
2nd place, silver medalist(s)	Jozef Pribilinec (TCH)	1:20:59	
3rd place, bronze medalist(s)	Yevgeniy Yevsyukov (URS)	1:21:08	
4	Josep Marín (ESP)	1:21:21	
5	Gérard Lelièvre (FRA)	1:21:37	NR
6	Pavol Blažek (TCH)	1:21:54	
7	Maurizio Damilano (ITA)	1:21:57	
8	Guillaume LeBlanc (CAN)	1:22:04	NR
9	Raúl González (MEX)	1:22:06	
10	Roland Wieser (GDR)	1:22:14	
11	Anatoliy Gorshkov (URS)	1:22:34	
12	Reima Salonen (FIN)	1:22:51	
13	Pyotr Pochenchuk (URS)	1:24:55	
14	Ralf Kowalsky (GDR)	1:25:13	
15	Dave Smith (AUS)	1:25:23	
16	Enrique Vera (MEX)	1:25:27	
17	Alik Basriev (BUL)	1:25:49	
18	Carlo Mattioli (ITA)	1:25:53	
19	Jim Heiring (USA)	1:25:55	
20	Marcel Jobin (CAN)	1:26:13	
21	Erling Andersen (NOR)	1:26:39	
22	Michael Bonke (GDR)	1:26:57	
23	José Pinto (POR)	1:27:10	
24	Alessandro Pezzatini (ITA)	1:27:15	
25	Phil Vesty (GBR)	1:27:20	
26	Martial Fesselier (FRA)	1:27:39	
27	Roman Mrázek (TCH)	1:27:46	
28	Jordi Llopart (ESP)	1:27:49	
29	Simon Baker (AUS)	1:28:09	
30	Willi Sawall (AUS)	1:28:16	
31	Per Rasmussen (SWE)	1:28:51	
32	Matti Katila (FIN)	1:29:14	
33	Lars Ove Moen (NOR)	1:29:16	
34	Francisco Botonero (ESP)	1:29:42	
35	Abdelwahab Ferguene (ALG)	1:29:53	
36	Tim Lewis (USA)	1:30:10	
37	Roger Mills (GBR)	1:30:25	
38	Shemsu Hassan (ETH)	1:30:36	
39	Kevin Taylor (NZL)	1:30:38	
40	Li Guangxing (CHN)	1:31:02	
41	Ian McCombie (GBR)	1:31:14	
42	Chand Ram (IND)	1:31:32	
43	Jiang Shaohong (CHN)	1:31:43	
44	Petri Makela (FIN)	1:32:21	
45	Benamar Kachkouche (ALG)	1:32:33	
46	Takehiro Sonohara (JPN)	1:33:45	
47	Sergio Gutierrez (CRC)	1:33:59	
48	Joseph Martens (BEL)	1:34:39	
49	Santiago Fonseca (HON)	1:35:07	
50	Shane Donelly (NZL)	1:35:21	
51	Osvaldo Morejon (BOL)	1:36:37	
52	Per Nielsen (DEN)	1:38:52	
53	Stefano Casali (SMR)	1:39:41	
54	Nadarajan Rengasamy (SIN)	1:51:35	
55	Uaongo Areai (COK)	2:05:13	
DID NOT FINISH (DNF)
—	Marco Evoniuk (USA)	DNF	
—	François Lapointe (CAN)	DNF	
—	Keith Olsthoom (NZL)	DNF	
DISQUALIFIED (DSQ)
—	Bo Gustafsson (SWE)	DSQ	
—	Burhan Vurgun (TUR)	DSQ	
DID NOT START (DNS)
—	Jan Staaf (SWE)	DNS	
—	Zhang Fuxin (CHN)	DNS	

== See also ==
- 1980 Men's Olympic 20km Walk (Moscow)
- 1982 Men's European Championships 20km Walk (Athens)
- 1983 Race Walking Year Ranking
- 1984 Men's Olympic 20km Walk (Los Angeles)
- 1984 Men's Friendship Games 20km Walk (Moscow)
- 1986 Men's European Championships 20km Walk (Stuttgart)
- 1988 Men's Olympic 20km Walk (Seoul)
