= 1986 European Athletics Championships – Men's 20 kilometres walk =

Men's 20 kilometres walk at the European Athletics Championships

These are the official results of the Men's 20 km walk event at the 1986 European Championships in Stuttgart, West Germany, held on 27 August 1986.

== Medalists ==
Gold	Jozef Pribilinec; Czechoslovakia (TCH)
Silver	Maurizio Damilano; Italy (ITA)
Bronze	Miguel Ángel Prieto; Spain (ESP)

== Final ==
Rank	Final	Time
	Jozef Pribilinec (TCH)	1:21.15
	Maurizio Damilano (ITA)	1:21.17
	Miguel Ángel Prieto (ESP)	1:21.36
4.	Viktor Mostovik (URS)	1:21.52
5.	Walter Arena (ITA)	1:22.42
6.	Pavol Blažek (TCH)	1:23.26
7.	Alexey Pershin (URS)	1:24.11
8.	Aleksandr Boyarshinov (URS)	1:24.16
9.	Jan Staaf (SWE)	1:24.25
10.	Martial Fesselier (FRA)	1:26.20
11.	Carlo Mattioli (ITA)	1:26.520
12.	Jan Kłos (POL)	1:27.53
13.	Stefan Johansson (SWE)	1:28.03
14.	José Urbano (POR)	1:30.07
15.	Sándor Urbanik (HUN)	1:31.40
16.	Martin Toporek (AUT)	1:36.14
—	Ralph Kowalsky (GDR)	DSQ
—	Axel Noack (GDR)	DSQ
—	José Marín (ESP)	DSQ
—	Roman Mrázek (TCH)	DSQ
—	Wolfgang Wiedemann (FRG)	DSQ
—	Reima Salonen (FIN)	DSQ

== Participation ==
According to an unofficial count, 22 athletes from 13 countries participated in the event.

- Austria (1)
- Czechoslovakia (3)
- East Germany (2)
- Finland (1)
- France (1)
- Hungary (1)
- Italy (3)
- Poland (1)
- Portugal (1)
- Soviet Union (3)
- Spain (2)
- Sweden (2)
- West Germany (1)

== See also ==
- 1980 Men's Olympic 20km Walk (Moscow)
- 1982 Men's European Championships 20km Walk (Athens)
- 1983 Men's World Championships 20km Walk (Helsinki)
- 1984 Men's Olympic 20km Walk (Los Angeles)
- 1987 Men's World Championships 20km Walk (Rome)
- 1988 Men's Olympic 20km Walk (Seoul)
- 1990 Men's European Championships 20km Walk (Split)
