= Athletics at the 1989 Summer Universiade – Men's 20 kilometres walk =

The men's 20 kilometres walk event at the 1989 Summer Universiade was held in Duisburg on 25 August 1989.

== Results ==
Rank	Athlete	Nationality	Time	Notes
1st place, gold medalist(s)	Walter Arena	Italy	1:23:25	GR
2nd place, silver medalist(s)	Miguel Ángel Prieto	Spain	1:23:39	
3rd place, bronze medalist(s)	Andrew Jachno	Australia	1:23:48	
4	Andreas Hühmer	West Germany	1:25:45	
5	Grigoriy Kornev	Soviet Union	1:26:02	
6	Robert Korzeniowski	Poland	1:26:10	
7	Giuseppe De Gaetano	Italy	1:27:23	
8	Luis Maroto	Spain	1:29:13	
9	Mark Manning	United States	1:29:28	
10	Paul Copeland	Australia	1:31:24	
11	Curtis Fisher	United States	1:31:27	
12	Daniel Levesque	Canada	1:35:37	
13	Michael Harvey	Australia	1:37:29	
	Lawrence Tetteh	Ghana	DNF	
	Ansah Coffie	Ghana	DQ	
	Miguel Ángel Rodríguez	Mexico	DQ	
	Tim Berrett	United States	DQ	
	Vladimir Druchik	Soviet Union	DQ	
	Albert Budondi	Tanzania	DQ	
	Francis Kea	Kenya	DQ	
