= Athletics at the 1999 Pan American Games – Men's 50 kilometres walk =

Men's 50 kilometres walk at the Pan American Games

The men's 50 kilometres walk event at the 1999 Pan American Games was held on July 29.

== Results ==
Rank	Name	Nationality	Time	Notes
1st place, gold medalist(s)	Joel Sánchez	Mexico	4:06:31	
2nd place, silver medalist(s)	Carlos Mercenario	Mexico	4:09:48	
3rd place, bronze medalist(s)	Philip Dunn	United States	4:13:45	
4	Gary Morgan	United States	4:40:29	
	Tim Berrett	Canada	DNF	
	Héctor Moreno	Colombia	DNF	
	Jorge Pino	Cuba	DQ	
