= Shchennikov =

Shchennikov (Russian: Щенников) is a Russian surname. Notable people with the surname include:

- Georgi Shchennikov (born 1991), Russian footballer
- Mikhail Shchennikov (born 1967), Russian race walker
