= Miguel Ángel Prieto =

Spanish racewalker

Personal information
- Born: 20 September 1964 (age 61) Segovia, Spain

Sport
- Sport: Track and field
Medal record
Representing Spain
European Championships
Bronze medal – third place	1986 Stuttgart	20 km walk
Summer Universiade
Silver medal – second place	1989 Duisburg	20 km walk

Miguel Ángel Prieto Adanero (born 20 September 1964) is a race walker from Spain, who represented his native country at the 1992 Olympic Games in Barcelona, Spain, where he came tenth overall. He was a four-time Spanish indoor champion in the 5000 m walk and won the outdoor 20 km national title in 1990.

Prieto was born in Segovia, and made his international debut at the 1983 European Athletics Junior Championships, placing fifth in the 10,000 m walk. He came seventh in the 20 km race walk at the 1985 IAAF World Race Walking Cup then went on to win a bronze medal in the event at the 1986 European Athletics Championships. He established himself as one of Spain's leading walkers, competing at the World Championships in Athletics in 1987 and 1991. Prieto won his second international medal at the 1989 Summer Universiade, where he was the silver medallist in the 20 km walk behind Italy's Walter Arena. He came 13th at the 1990 European Athletics Championships and finished one place lower than that at the 1991 IAAF World Race Walking Cup.

He made a competitive return at the age of 46 at the 2011 European Race Walking Cup. He managed 14th place in the 50 km event.

== International competitions ==
Year	Competition	Venue	Position	Event	Notes
Representing Spain
1983	European Junior Championships	Schwechat, Austria	5th	10,000 m	44:59.84
1985	World Race Walking Cup qualifying round	Saint-Aubin-lès-Elbeuf, France	4th	20 km	1:25:11
1985	World Race Walking Cup	St John's, Isle of Man	7th	20 km	1:24:04
1986	European Championships	Stuttgart, West Germany	3rd	20 km	1:21.36
1986	Ibero-American Championships	La Habana, Cuba	4th	20 km	1:42:26
1987	European Indoor Championships	Liévin, France	11th	5000 m	20:11.12
1987	World Race Walking Cup	New York City, United States	35th	20 km	1:25:52
1987	World Championships	Rome, Italy	27th	20 km	1:27.40
1989	World Race Walking Cup	L'Hospitalet de Llobregat, Spain	23rd	20 km	1:23:50
1989	Universiade	Duisburg, West Germany	2nd	20 km	1:23:39
1990	European Championships	Split, Yugoslavia	13th	20 km	1:28:32
1991	World Indoor Championships	Seville, Spain	4th	5000 m	18:53.83
1991	World Race Walking Cup	San Jose, United States	14th	20 km	1:22:19
1991	World Championships	Tokyo, Japan	21st	20 km	1:24:06
1992	Olympic Games	Barcelona, Spain	10th	20 km	1:26:38
2011	European Race Walking Cup	Olhão, Portugal	13th	50 km	4:06:45
2011	European Race Walking Cup	Olhão, Portugal	3rd	Team - 50 km	39 pts
2012	World Race Walking Cup	Saransk, Russia	58th	50 km	4:19:52
