= 1982 European Athletics Indoor Championships – Men's 5000 metres walk =

The men's 5000 metres walk event at the 1982 European Athletics Indoor Championships was held on 7 March.

== Results ==
Rank	Name	Nationality	Time	Notes
1st place, gold medalist(s)	Maurizio Damilano	Italy	19:40.28	
2nd place, silver medalist(s)	Carlo Mattioli	Italy	20:06.91	
3rd place, bronze medalist(s)	Martin Toporek	Austria	20:19.47	
4	Alessandro Pezzatini	Italy	20:27.68	
5	Steve Barry	Great Britain	20:37.47	
6	Hristos Karageorgios	Greece	21:00.69	
