= Carlos Mercenario =

Mexican race walker (born 1967)

Personal information
- Full name: Carlos Mercenario Carbajal
- Born: May 23, 1967 (age 59) Ciudad de México, Distrito Federal
- Height: 1.75 m (5 ft 9 in)
- Weight: 63 kg (139 lb)

Sport
- Country: Mexico
- Sport: Athletics
- Event: Race walking
Medal record
Men's athletics
Representing Mexico
Olympic Games
Silver medal – second place	1992 Barcelona	50 km walk
CAC Junior Championships (U20)
Gold medal – first place	1986 Mexico City	10,000 m walk
Gold medal – first place	1984 San Juan	10,000 m walk
CAC Junior Championships (U17)
Gold medal – first place	1982 Bridgetown	5000 m walk
Pan American Junior Championships
Gold medal – first place	1984 Nassau	10,000 m walk
- Updated on 27 July 2013

Carlos Mercenario Carbajal (born May 23, 1967) is a Mexican retired race walker. He was born in Mexico City, Distrito Federal. He is the 1992 Olympic Silver Medalist in the 50 K walk and a three-time World Race Walking Cup champion.

== Personal bests ==
- 20 km: 1:19:24 hrs – (United States) New York City, 3 May 1987
- 50 km: 3:42:03 hrs – (United States) San Jose, California, 2 June 1991

== Achievements ==
Year	Competition	Venue	Position	Event	Notes
Representing Mexico
1982	Central American and Caribbean; Junior Championships (U-17)	Bridgetown, Barbados	1st	5000 m	22:52.46
1984	Central American and Caribbean; Junior Championships (U-20)	San Juan, Puerto Rico	1st	10,000 m	46:48.7
1984	Pan American Junior Championships	Nassau, Bahamas	1st	10,000 m	48:51.7
1986	Central American and Caribbean Junior Championships (U-20)	Mexico City, Mexico	1st	10,000 m	43:31.9 A
1986	World Junior Championships	Athens, Greece	7th	10,000m	41:50.20
1986	Pan American Race Walking Cup	Saint Léonard, Canada	2nd	20 km	1:21:33
1987	Pan American Games	Indianapolis, United States	1st	20 km	1:24:50
1987	World Race Walking Cup	New York City, United States	1st	20 km	1:19:24
1987	World Championships	Rome, Italy	—	20 km	DSQ
1988	Pan American Race Walking Cup	Mar del Plata, Argentina	1st	20 km	1:24:00
1988	Ibero-American Championships	Mexico City, Mexico	1st	20 km	1:21:46.6 A
1988	Olympic Games	Seoul, South Korea	7th	20 km	1:20:53
1990	Pan American Race Walking Cup	Xalapa, Mexico	3rd	20 km	1:22:25
1990	Ibero-American Championships	Manaus, Brazil	1st	20 km	1:25:29.5
1990	Central American and Caribbean Games	Mexico City, Mexico	2nd	20 km	1:24:03
1991	Pan American Games	Havana, Cuba	1st	50 km	4:03:09
1991	World Race Walking Cup	San Jose, United States	1st	50 km	3:42:03
1991	World Championships	Tokyo, Japan	12th	20 km	1:21:37
1992	Olympic Games	Barcelona, Spain	2nd	50 km	3:52.09
1993	World Race Walking Cup	Monterrey, Mexico	1st	50 km	3:50:28
1993	World Championships	Stuttgart, Germany	8th	50 km	3:50:53
1994	Pan American Race Walking Cup	Atlanta, United States	1st	50 km	3:52:06
1995	Pan American Games	Mar del Plata, Argentina	1st	50 km	3:47:55
1995	World Race Walking Cup	Beijing, China	8th	50 km	3:56:41
1995	World Championships	Gothenburg, Sweden	12th	50 km	3:55.24
1999	Pan American Games	Winnipeg, Canada	2nd	50 km	4:09:48
1999	World Championships	Seville, Spain	23rd	50 km	4:09:40

Records
Preceded by (Czechoslovakia) Jozef Pribilinec	Men's 20km Walk World Record Holder; May 3, 1987 – June 21, 1987	Succeeded by (East Germany) Axel Noack
