= 1988 World Junior Championships in Athletics – Men's 10,000 metres walk =

The men's 10,000 metres walk event at the 1988 World Junior Championships in Athletics was held in Sudbury, Ontario, Canada, at Laurentian University Stadium on 29 July.

== Medalists ==
Gold	Alberto Cruz; Mexico
Silver	Valentí Massana; Spain
Bronze	Mikhail Khmelnitsky; Soviet Union

== Results ==
=== Final ===
29 July

Rank	Name	Nationality	Time	Notes
1st place, gold medalist(s)	Alberto Cruz	Mexico	41:16.11	
2nd place, silver medalist(s)	Valentí Massana	Spain	41:33.95	
3rd place, bronze medalist(s)	Mikhail Khmelnitsky	Soviet Union	41:38.86	
4	German Nieto	Spain	41:46.41	
5	Andrey Sapnikas	Soviet Union	42:17.93	
6	Valentin Kolev	Bulgaria	42:40.45	
7	Nick A'Hern	Australia	42:51.19	
8	Sérgio Galdino	Brazil	43:04.29	
9	Arturo Di Mezza	Italy	43:31.59	
10	Göran Lindé	Sweden	43:54.60	
11	Ralf Weise	East Germany	44:07.26	
12	Greg Robertson	Australia	44:34.26	
13	João Maral	Portugal	45:03.70	
14	Juan Rojas	Ecuador	45:44.35	
15	Davide Arena	Italy	45:53.77	
16	Karoly Kirszt	Hungary	46:24.72	
17	Chris MacKay	Canada	47:23.75	
18	John Marter	United States	47:39.39	
19	Jules Riel	Canada	48:18.02	
20	Rajan Khatri	Nepal	52:16.39	
	Aaron González	Mexico	DQ	
	Tsuyoshi Hamade	Japan	DQ	
	Jan Olsson	Sweden	DNF	
	Lennie Becker	United States	DNF	
	Leszek Pazio	Poland	DNF	

== Participation ==
According to an unofficial count, 25 athletes from 17 countries participated in the event.

- Australia (2)
- Brazil (1)
- Bulgaria (1)
- Canada (2)
- East Germany (1)
- Ecuador (1)
- Hungary (1)
- Italy (2)
- Japan (1)
- Mexico (2)
- Nepal (1)
- Poland (1)
- Portugal (1)
- Soviet Union (2)
- Spain (2)
- Sweden (2)
- United States (2)
