= Thierry Toutain =

French racewalker

Medal record

Men's athletics

Representing France

European Championships
Silver medal – second place	1994 Helsinki	50 km walk
Bronze medal – third place	1990 Split	20 km walk

Thierry Toutain (born 14 February 1962 in Fourmies) is a retired French race walker. With a time of 3:40:57.9, achieved in 1996, Toutain held the world record over 50,000 metres track walking until 12 March 2011, when Yohann Diniz broke it with a time of 3:35:27.

== Achievements ==
Year	Competition	Venue	Position	Event	Notes
Representing France
1987	World Race Walking Cup	New York City, United States	15th	50 km	3:55:58
1987	World Championships	Rome, Italy	14th	50 km	3:56:34
1988	Olympic Games	Seoul, South Korea	18th	20 km	1:22:55
1989	World Race Walking Cup	L'Hospitalet, Spain	10th	20 km	1:22:06
1989	Jeux de la Francophonie	Casablanca, Morocco	3rd	20 km	1:35:08
1990	European Championships	Split, Yugoslavia	3rd	20 km	1:23:22
1991	World Race Walking Cup	San Jose, California, United States	3rd	20 km	1:20:56
1991	World Championships	Tokyo, Japan	9th	20 km	1:21:22
1992	Olympic Games	Barcelona, Spain	—	20 km	DSQ
1993	World Race Walking Cup	Monterrey, Mexico	18th	50 km	4:05:18
1994	European Championships	Helsinki, Finland	2nd	50 km	3:43:52
1995	World Race Walking Cup	Beijing, PR China	7th	20 km	1:21:06
1995	World Championships	Gothenburg, Sweden	—	50 km	DNF
1996	Olympic Games	Atlanta, U.S.	10th	20 km	1:21:56
1996	Olympic Games	Atlanta, U.S.	—	50 km	DSQ
1998	European Championships	Budapest, Hungary	—	50 km	DNF
