= Oleg Troshin =

Soviet racewalker

Personal information
- Nationality: Soviet
- Born: 1 August 1964 (age 61)

Sport
- Sport: Athletics
- Event: Racewalking

Oleg Troshin (born 1 August 1964) is a Soviet racewalker. He competed in the men's 20 kilometres walk at the 1992 Summer Olympics, representing the Unified Team.
