= Axel Noack =

German racewalker

Axel Noack (born 23 September 1961 in Görlitz) is a German former race walker. On 21 June 1987 in Chemnitz he achieved a new world best time in 20 km walk with 1'19:12 hours.

== International competitions ==
Year	Competition	Venue	Position	Event	Notes
Representing East Germany
1985	World Race Walking Cup	St John's, Isle of Man	3rd	50 km	3:56:53
1986	European Championships	Stuttgart, West Germany	—	20 km	DSQ
1987	World Race Walking Cup	New York City, United States	6th	20 km	1:21:53
1987	World Championships	Rome, Italy	—	20 km	DQ
1988	Olympic Games	Seoul, South Korea	8th	20 km	1:21:14
1990	European Indoor Championships	Glasgow, United Kingdom	3rd	5000 m	19:08.36
1990	European Championships	Split, Yugoslavia	—	20 km	DNF
Representing Germany
1991	World Race Walking Cup	San Jose, United States	9th	20 km	1:21:35
1991	World Championships	Tokyo, Japan	11th	20 km	1:21:35
1992	Olympic Games	Barcelona, Spain	20th	20 km	1:29:55
1993	World Championships	Stuttgart, Germany	4th	50 km	3:43:50
1994	European Championships	Helsinki, Finland	10th	50 km	3:50:32
1995	World Championships	Gothenburg, Sweden	13th	50 km	3:55:51
1996	Olympic Games	Atlanta, United States	12th	50 km	3:51:55
1997	World Championships	Athens, Greece	16th	50 km	3:59:29
1998	European Championships	Budapest, Hungary	—	50 km	DQ
2000	European Race Walking Cup	Eisenhüttenstadt, Germany	—	50 km	DNF

Records
Preceded by Carlos Mercenario	Men's 20 km walk world record Holder; 21 June 1987 – 30 July 1988	Succeeded by Mikhail Shchennikov
