= Carlo Mattioli =

Italian race walker

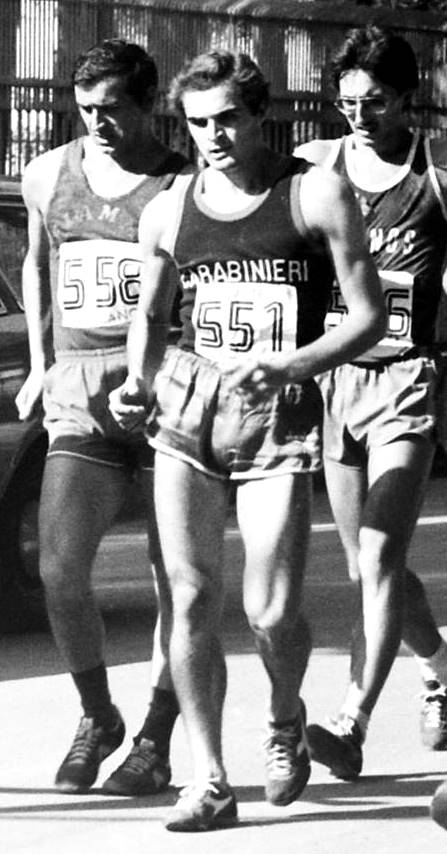
- Mattioli (#551) in a 50 km walk in Pescara in 1978.

Personal information
- National team: Italy: 41 caps (1978-1991)
- Born: 23 October 1954 (age 71) Pergola

Sport
- Country: Italy
- Sport: Athletics
- Event: Racewalking
- Club: C.S. Carabinieri

Achievements and titles
- Personal best: 20 km: 1:22:53 (1987)
Medal record
European Indoor Championships
Silver medal – second place	1982 Milan	5000 m walk
Universiade
Silver medal – second place	1981 Bucharest	20 km walk
Mediterranean Games
Silver medal – second place	1987 Latakia	20 km walk
Bronze medal – third place	1979 Split	20 km walk
World Race Walking Cup
Gold medal – first place	1981 Valencia	Combined Team
Gold medal – first place	1991 san Josè	Combined Team
Silver medal – second place	1983 Bergen	Combined Team
Silver medal – second place	1987 New York City	Combined Team
Silver medal – second place	1989 L'Hospitalet	Combined Team

Carlo "Carletto" Mattioli (born 23 October 1954 in Pergola, Pesaro e Urbino) is a retired male race walker from Italy, who represented his native country twice at the Olympic Games: 1984 and 1988.

== Biography ==
Carlo Mattioli has won eight times the individual national championship, He won five medal at the IAAF World Race Walking Team Championships with the Italy national athletics team and four at the individual level in others international athletics competitions.

== Achievements ==
Year	Competition	Venue	Position	Event	Time	Notes
1979	Mediterranean Games	(Socialist Federal Republic of Yugoslavia) Split	3rd	20 km	1:24:56	
1981	World Race Walking Cup	(Spain) Valencia	13th	20 km	1:28:52	
1981	Universiade	(Romania) Bucharest	2nd	20 km	1:28:10	
1982	European Indoor Championships	(Italy) Milan	2nd	5000 m	20:06.91	
1982	European Championships	(Greece) Athens	6th	20 km	1:26:56	
1983	World Race Walking Cup	(Norway) Bergen	7th	20 km	1:21:11	
1983	World Championships	(Finland) Helsinki	18th	20 km	1:25:53	
1984	Olympic Games	(United States) Los Angeles	5th	20 km	1:25:07	
1985	World Race Walking Cup	(United Kingdom) St John's	8th	20 km	1:24:14	
1986	European Championships	(West Germany) Stuttgart	11th	20 km	1:26.52	
1987	World Race Walking Cup	(United States) New York City	18th	20 km	1:23:26	
1987	World Championships	(Socialist Federal Republic of Yugoslavia) Rome	5th	20 km	1:22:53	
1987	Mediterranean Games	(Syria) Latakia	2nd	20 km	1:25:34	
1988	Olympic Games	(South Korea) |Seoul	19th	20 km	1:22:58	

== National titles ==
- Italian Athletics Championships
  - 10,000 metres walk track: 1980, 1986 (2)
  - 20 km walk: road: 1987 (1)
- Italian Indoor Athletics Championships
  - 5000 metres walk: 1979, 1980, 1985, 1986, 1987 (5)
