= Marc Sowa =

Luxembourgish racewalker

Personal information
- Nationality: Luxembourgish
- Born: 12 November 1963 (age 62)

Sport
- Sport: Athletics
- Event: Racewalking

Marc Sowa (born 12 November 1963) is a Luxembourgish racewalker.

He tried out four times in the Olympics, including in the men's 20 kilometres walk at the 1988 Summer Olympics.
