= Justus Kavulanya =

Kenyan racewalker

Personal information
- Nationality: Kenyan
- Born: 19 September 1968 (age 57)

Sport
- Sport: Athletics
- Event: Racewalking

Justus Kavulanya (born 19 September 1968) is a Kenyan racewalker. He competed in the men's 20 kilometres walk at the 1996 Summer Olympics.
