= José Pinto (race walker) =

Portuguese racewalker

José Luís Franca Abranches Pinto (born 19 June 1956 in Lisbon) is a Portuguese retired race walker. He represented his native country Portugal at three consecutive Olympic Games, starting in 1984.

== Achievements ==
| Year | Competition | Venue | Position | Event | Notes |
Representing Portugal
| 1982 | European Championships | Athens, Greece | 14th | 20 km | 1:34:19 |
| 1983 | World Championships | Helsinki, Finland | 23rd | 20 km | 1:27:10 |
| 1983 | World Championships | Helsinki, Finland | 16th | 50 km | 4:03:47 |
| 1983 | Ibero-American Championships | Barcelona, Spain | 2nd | 20 km | 1:31:03 |
| 1984 | Olympic Games | Los Angeles, United States | 25th | 20 km | 1:30:54 |
| 1984 | Olympic Games | Los Angeles, United States | 8th | 50 km | 4:04:42 |
| 1986 | European Championships | Stuttgart, West Germany | — | 50 km | DNF |
| 1987 | European Indoor Championships | Liévin, France | 18th (h) | 5000 m | 20:20.06 |
| 1987 | World Championships | Rome, Italy | 18th | 20 km | 1:25.24 |
| 1987 | World Championships | Rome, Italy | 15th | 50 km | 3:56.40 |
| 1988 | Olympic Games | Seoul, South Korea | 31st | 20 km | 1:26:33 |
| 1988 | Olympic Games | Seoul, South Korea | 21st | 50 km | 3:55:57 |
| 1990 | European Championships | Split, Yugoslavia | — | 20 km | DNF |
| 1990 | European Championships | Split, Yugoslavia | — | 50 km | DNF |
| 1992 | Olympic Games | Barcelona, Spain | — | 50 km | DSQ |
