= Athletics at the 1992 Summer Olympics – Men's 20 kilometres walk =

Men's 20 kilometres walk at the Games of the XXV Olympiad
- Venue: Olympic Stadium
- Dates: July 31
- Competitors: 42 from 23 nations
- Winning time: 1:21:45

Medalists
1st place, gold medalist(s)		Daniel Plaza; Spain
2nd place, silver medalist(s)		Guillaume LeBlanc; Canada
3rd place, bronze medalist(s)		Giovanni De Benedictis; Italy

These are the official results of the Men's 20 km Walk at the 1992 Summer Olympics in Barcelona, Spain, held on July 31, 1992. There were a total number of 42 competitors, with five athletes who were disqualified.

== Records ==
Standing records prior to the 1992 Summer Olympics
World Record	Pavol Blažek (TCH)	1:18.13	September 16, 1990	Hildesheim, West Germany
Olympic Record	Jozef Pribilinec (TCH)	1:19.57	September 23, 1988	Seoul, South Korea

== Results ==
Rank	Athlete	Nation	Time	Time behind	Notes
1st place, gold medalist(s)	Daniel Plaza	Spain	1:21:45		
2nd place, silver medalist(s)	Guillaume LeBlanc	Canada	1:22:25		
3rd place, bronze medalist(s)	Giovanni De Benedictis	Italy	1:23:11		
4	Maurizio Damilano	Italy	1:23:39		
5	Chen Shaoguo	China	1:24:06		
6	Jimmy McDonald	Ireland	1:25:16		
7	Daniel García	Mexico	1:25:35		
8	Sándor Urbanik	Hungary	1:26:08		
9	Héctor Moreno	Colombia	1:26:23		
10	Miguel Ángel Prieto	Spain	1:26:38		
11	Robert Ihly	Germany	1:26:56		
12	Mikhail Shchennikov	Unified Team	1:27:17		
13	Vladimir Andreyev	Unified Team	1:28:25		
14	Tim Berrett	Canada	1:28:25		
15	Stefan Johansson	Sweden	1:28:37		
16	Chris Maddocks	Great Britain	1:28:45		
17	Pavol Blažek	Czechoslovakia	1:29:23		
18	Walter Arena	Italy	1:29:34		
19	Igor Kollár	Czechoslovakia	1:29:38		
20	Axel Noack	Germany	1:29:55		
21	Joel Sánchez	Mexico	1:30:12		
22	Nicholas A'Hern	Australia	1:31:39		
23	Andrew Penn	Great Britain	1:31:40		
24	Martin Rush	Great Britain	1:31:56		
25	Shemisu Hasen	Ethiopia	1:32:39		
26	Viktoras Meškauskas	Lithuania	1:33:24		
27	Sérgio Galdino	Brazil	1:33:32		
28	Ján Záhončík	Czechoslovakia	1:33:37		
29	Ernesto Canto	Mexico	1:33:51		
30	Allen James	United States	1:35:12		
31	Andrew Jachno	Australia	1:36:49		
32	Marcelo Palma	Brazil	1:40:11		
—	Li Mingcai	China	DNF		
—	Robert Korzeniowski	Poland	DNF		
—	Oleg Troshin	Unified Team	DNF		
—	Ademar Kammler	Brazil	DNF		
—	Jefferson Pérez	Ecuador	DNF		
—	Valentí Massana	Spain	DSQ		
—	Thierry Toutain	France	DSQ		
—	Bobby O'Leary	Ireland	DSQ		
—	José Urbano	Portugal	DSQ		
—	Saleumphone Sopraseut	Laos	DSQ		

== See also ==
- 1990 Men's European Championships 20 km Walk (Split)
- 1991 Men's World Championships 20 km Walk (Tokyo)
- 1993 Men's World Championships 20 km Walk (Stuttgart)
