= 1993 World Championships in Athletics – Men's 20 kilometres walk =

These are the official results of the Men's 20 km Walk event at the 1993 World Championships in Stuttgart, Germany. There were a total of 48 participating athletes, with the final held on Sunday August 15, 1993.

== Medalists ==
Gold	Valentí Massana; Spain (ESP)
Silver	Giovanni De Benedictis; Italy (ITA)
Bronze	Daniel Plaza; Spain (ESP)

== Abbreviations ==
- All times shown are in hours:minutes:seconds

DNS	did not start
NM	no mark
WR	world record
AR	area record
NR	national record
PB	personal best
SB	season best

== Records ==
Standing records prior to the 1993 World Athletics Championships
World Record	Pavol Blažek (TCH)	1:18.13	September 16, 1990	Hildesheim, Germany
Event Record	Maurizio Damilano (ITA)	1:19.37	August 24, 1991	Tokyo, Japan

== Final ranking ==
Rank	Athlete	Time	Note
1st place, gold medalist(s)	Valentí Massana (ESP)	1:22:31	
2nd place, silver medalist(s)	Giovanni De Benedictis (ITA)	1:23:06	
3rd place, bronze medalist(s)	Daniel Plaza (ESP)	1:23:18	
4	Jaime Barroso (ESP)	1:23:41	
5	Yevgeniy Misyulya (BLR)	1:23:45	
6	Sérgio Galdino (BRA)	1:23:51	
7	Robert Ihly (GER)	1:24:21	
8	Igor Kollár (SVK)	1:24:23	
9	Ignacio Zamudio (MEX)	1:24:32	
10	Sándor Urbanik (HUN)	1:24:10	
11	Héctor Moreno (COL)	1:24:43	
12	Viktor Mostovik (MDA)	1:24:53	
13	Arturo Di Mezza (ITA)	1:24:59	
14	Jacek Muller (POL)	1:25:24	
15	Pavol Blažek (SVK)	1:25:31	
16	Jean-Olivier Brosseau (FRA)	1:25:53	
17	Jozef Pribilinec (SVK)	1:26:11	
18	Allen James (USA)	1:26:53	
19	Vladimir Andreyev (RUS)	1:27:01	
20	Tim Berrett (CAN)	1:27:08	
21	Denis Langlois (FRA)	1:28:02	
22	Stefan Johansson (SWE)	1:28:02	
23	Tsutomu Takushima (JPN)	1:28:39	
24	Nick A'Hern (AUS)	1:28:47	
25	Viktoras Meškauskas (LTU)	1:28:57	
26	Chris Maddocks (GBR)	1:29:22	
27	Scott Nelson (NZL)	1:30:17	
28	Jan Staaf (SWE)	1:30:29	
29	Gyula Dudás (HUN)	1:30:46	
30	Darrell Stone (GBR)	1:32:55	
31	Grigoriy Kornev (RUS)	1:33:16	
32	Hatem Ghoula (TUN)	1:33:24	
33	Vladimir Ostrovskiy (ISR)	1:35:41	
34	Abdelwahab Ferguene (ALG)	1:35:48	
35	Sverre Jensen (NOR)	1:35:53	
DID NOT FINISH (DNF)
—	Andrew Penn (GBR)	DNF	
—	Frants Kostyukevich (BLR)	DNF	
—	Li Mingcai (CHN)	DNF	
—	Valeriy Borisov (KAZ)	DNF	
—	Sergey Shildkret (AZE)	DNF	
DISQUALIFIED (DSQ)
—	Hirofumi Sakai (JPN)	DSQ	
—	Costică Bălan (ROM)	DSQ	
—	Yuriy Kuko (BLR)	DSQ	
—	Mikhail Shchennikov (RUS)	DSQ	
—	Bernardo Segura (MEX)	DSQ	
—	Daniel García (MEX)	DSQ	
—	Walter Arena (ITA)	DSQ	
—	Jonathan Matthews (USA)	DNS	

== See also ==
- 1990 Men's European Championships 20km Walk (Split)
- 1992 Men's Olympic 20km Walk (Barcelona)
- 1993 Race Walking Year Ranking
- 1994 Men's European Championships 20km Walk (Helsinki)
- 1995 Men's World Championships 20km Walk (Gothenburg)
