= 1987 World Championships in Athletics – Men's 20 kilometres walk =

These are the official results of the Men's 20 km Walk event at the 1987 World Championships in Rome, Italy. The race was held on Sunday, August 30, 1987.

== Medalists ==
Gold	Maurizio Damilano; Italy (ITA)
Silver	Jozef Pribilinec; Czechoslovakia (TCH)
Bronze	Josep Marín; Spain (ESP)

== Abbreviations ==
- All times shown are in hours:minutes:seconds

DNS	did not start
NM	no mark
WR	world record
AR	area record
CR	event record
NR	national record
PB	personal best
SB	season best

== Records ==
Standing records prior to the 1987 World Athletics Championships
World Record	Axel Noack (GDR)	1:19.12	June 21, 1987	Karl-Marx-Stadt, East Germany
Event Record	Ernesto Canto (MEX)	1:20.49	August 7, 1983	Helsinki, Finland
Broken records during the 1987 World Athletics Championships
Event Record	Ernesto Canto (MEX)	1:20.45	August 30, 1987	Rome, Italy

== Final ==
RANK	FINAL	TIME
	Maurizio Damilano (ITA)	1:20.45 CR
	Jozef Pribilinec (TCH)	1:21.07
	Josep Marín (ESP)	1:21.24
4.	Viktor Mostovik (URS)	1:21.53
5.	Carlo Mattioli (ITA)	1:22.53
6.	Roman Mrázek (TCH)	1:23.01
7.	Jean-Claude Corre (FRA)	1:23.38
8.	Querubin Moreno (COL)	1:23.42
9.	Ian McCombie (GBR)	1:23.51
10.	Reima Salonen (FIN)	1:24.14
11.	Pavol Blažek (TCH)	1:24.37
12.	Andrew Jachno (AUS)	1:24.46
13.	Martial Fesselier (FRA)	1:24.51
14.	Dominique Guebey (FRA)	1:25.01
15.	Erling Andersen (NOR)	1:25.08
16.	José Urbano (POR)	1:25.10
17.	Jan Staaf (SWE)	1:25.12
18.	José Pinto (POR)	1:25.24
19.	Tim Lewis (USA)	1:26.00
20.	Ricardo Pueyo (ESP)	1:26.09
21.	Ray Sharp (USA)	1:27.06
22.	Sándor Urbanik (HUN)	1:27.24
23.	Stefan Johansson (SWE)	1:27.27
24.	Simon Baker (AUS)	1:27.32
25.	Francisco Vargas (COL)	1:27.33
26.	Anatoliy Gorshkov (URS)	1:27.34
27.	Miguel Ángel Prieto (ESP)	1:27.40
28.	Wolfgang Wiedemann (FRG)	1:28.07
29.	Gary Morgan (USA)	1:28.08
30.	Vesa Puukari (FIN)	1:28.29
31.	Carlos Ramones (VEN)	1:28.40
32.	Santiago Fonseca (HON)	1:28.44
33.	François Lapointe (CAN)	1:29.22
34.	Chris Maddocks (GBR)	1:32.36
35.	Abdelwahab Ferguene (ALG)	1:34.26
—	Frants Kostyukevich (URS)	DNF
—	Héctor Moreno (COL)	DNF
—	Axel Noack (GDR)	DSQ
—	Walter Arena (ITA)	DSQ
—	Ernesto Canto (MEX)	DSQ
—	Carlos Mercenario (MEX)	DSQ
—	Dave Smith (AUS)	DSQ

== See also ==
- 1978 Men's European Championships 20km Walk (Prague)
- 1980 Men's Olympic 20km Walk (Moscow)
- 1982 Men's European Championships 20km Walk (Athens)
- 1984 Men's Olympic 20km Walk (Los Angeles)
- 1986 Men's European Championships 20km Walk (Stuttgart)
- 1987 Race Walking Year Ranking
- 1988 Men's Olympic 20km Walk (Seoul)
