= Athletics at the 1991 Pan American Games – Men's 50 kilometres walk =

Men's 50 kilometres walk at the Pan American Games

The men's 50 kilometres walk event at the 1991 Pan American Games was held in Havana, Cuba on 11 August.

== Results ==
Rank	Name	Nationality	Time	Notes
1st place, gold medalist(s)	Carlos Mercenario	Mexico	4:03:09	
2nd place, silver medalist(s)	Miguel Ángel Rodríguez	Mexico	4:04:06	
3rd place, bronze medalist(s)	Edel Oliva	Cuba	4:16:27	
4	José Querubín Moreno	Colombia	4:23:48	
5	Oscar Vega	Cuba	4:29:17	
	Paul Wick	United States	DNF	
	Marco Evoniuk	United States	DNF	
	Luis Quispe	Bolivia	DNF	
	Héctor Moreno	Colombia	DNF	
