= Jeong Pil-hwa =

South Korean racewalker

Personal information
- Nationality: South Korean
- Born: 27 January 1955 (age 71)

Sport
- Sport: Athletics
- Event: Racewalking

Jeong Pil-hwa (born 27 January 1955) is a South Korean racewalker. He competed in the men's 20 kilometres walk at the 1988 Summer Olympics.

At the 1987 South Korean Athletics Championships, Jeong set a new South Korean record in the 20 km racewalk, breaking the old record by over 10 seconds.
