= Li Baojin =

Chinese racewalker

Personal information
- Nationality: Chinese
- Born: 2 November 1959 (age 66)

Sport
- Sport: Athletics
- Event: Racewalking

Li Baojin (born 2 November 1959) is a Chinese racewalker. He competed in the men's 20 kilometres walk at the 1988 Summer Olympics.
