= Sándor Urbanik =

Hungarian racewalker

Personal information
- Nationality: Hungarian
- Born: 15 December 1964 (age 61) Esztergom

Sport
- Country: Hungary
- Sport: Athletics
- Event: Racewalking
Medal record
European Indoor Championships
Bronze medal – third place	1988 Budapest	5000 m walk

Sándor Urbanik (born 15 December 1964 in Esztergom) is a retired male race walker from Hungary. He competed in four consecutive Summer Olympics for his native country, starting in 1988. He is married to fellow Hungarian race walker Mária Urbanik. He was a bronze medallist in the 5000 m walk at the 1988 European Athletics Indoor Championships, held in his native Hungary.

He represented Hungary at seven consecutive editions of the World Athletics Championships, from 1987 to 2001, with his best finish being tenth place at the 1993 World Championships in Athletics.

He is the Hungarian national record holder in several events, including the 10 km, 15 km, 20 km, 30 km and 35 km road distances, the hour walk (reaching 14,186 m), and also the indoor 5000 m distance with 18:34.77 minutes. He won twelve national titles in the 20 kilometres race walk at the Hungarian Athletics Championships, with ten straight wins from 1986–1995, and final wins in 2000 and 2001 after recouping the title from Gyula Dudás. He also won seven straight titles at the Hungarian Indoor Athletics Championships from 1988 to 1994. On the international circuit, he won the 2001 Dudinská Päťdesiatka race.

== International competitions ==
Representing Hungary
Year	Competition	Venue	Position	Event	Result	Notes
1986	European Championships	Stuttgart, West Germany	15th	20 km	1:31:40	
1987	European Indoor Championships	Liévin, France	4th	5000 m walk	19:13.09	
1987	World Indoor Championships	Indianapolis, United States	6th	5000 m walk	19:06.19	
1987	World Championships	Rome, Italy	22nd	20 km	1:27:24	
1988	European Indoor Championships	Budapest, Hungary	3rd	5000 m	18:45.91	
1988	Summer Olympics	Seoul, South Korea	21st	20 km	1:23:18	
1988	Summer Olympics	Seoul, South Korea	—	50 km	DNF	
1990	European Championships	Split, Yugoslavia	15th	20 km	1:29:19	
1990	European Championships	Split, Yugoslavia	—	50 km	DNF	
1991	World Race Walking Cup	San Jose, United States	17th	20 km	1:22:38	
1991	World Championships	Tokyo, Japan	14th	20 km	1:21:57	
1992	Olympic Games	Barcelona, Spain	8th	20 km	1:26:08	
1993	World Championships	Stuttgart, Germany	10th	20 km	1:24:40	
1994	European Championships	Helsinki, Finland	8th	20 km	1:22:49	
1995	World Race Walking Cup	Beijing, China	15th	50 km	3:52:07	
1995	World Championships	Gothenburg, Sweden	—	50 km	DNF	
1996	Summer Olympics	Atlanta, United States	13th	20 km	1:22:18	
1997	World Championships	Athens, Greece	26th	20 km	1:26:50	
1998	European Championships	Budapest, Hungary	5th	20 km	1:22.12	
1999	World Championships	Seville, Spain	—	20 km	DNF	
2000	European Race Walking Cup	Eisenhüttenstadt, Germany	—	20 km	DQ	
2000	Summer Olympics	Sydney, Australia	29th	20 km	1:26:16	
2001	European Race Walking Cup	Dudince, Slovakia	34th	20 km	1:27:21	
2001	World Championships	Edmonton, Canada	—	50 km	DNF	

== National titles ==
- Hungarian Athletics Championships
  - 20 km walk: 1986, 1987, 1988, 1989, 1990, 1991, 1992, 1993, 1994, 1995, 2000, 2001
- Hungarian Indoor Athletics Championships
  - 5000 m walk: 1988, 1989, 1990, 1991, 1992, 1993, 1994

== See also ==
- List of European Athletics Indoor Championships medalists (men)
- List of Hungarian Athletics Championships champions (men)
