= Bobby O'Leary =

Irish racewalker

Personal information
- Full name: Robert O'Leary
- Nationality: Irish
- Born: 19 June 1967 (age 59)

Sport
- Sport: Athletics
- Event: Racewalking

Robert O'Leary (born 19 June 1967) is an Irish racewalker. He competed in the men's 20 kilometres walk at the 1992 Summer Olympics.
