= Valentí Massana =

Spanish race walker

Medal record
Men's athletics
Representing Spain
Olympic Games
Bronze medal – third place	1996 Atlanta	50 km walk
World Championships
Gold medal – first place	1993 Stuttgart	20 km walk
Silver medal – second place	1995 Gothenburg	20 km walk
European Championships
Bronze medal – third place	1994 Helsinki	20 km walk
World Race Walking Cup
Silver medal – second place	1993 Monterrey	20 km walk

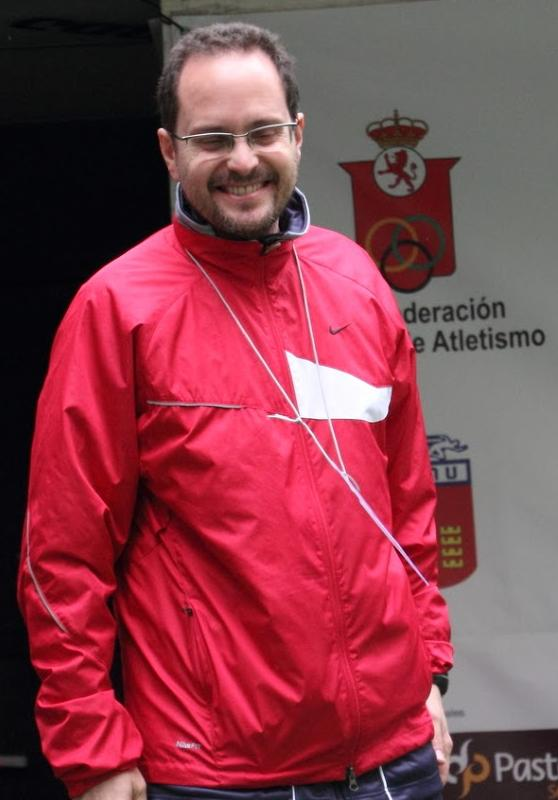

Valentín Massana Gracia (Note: In this Spanish name, the first or paternal surname is Massana and the second or maternal family name is Gracia.) (born 5 July 1970 in Viladecans) is a Spanish race walker, and the Spanish national record holder in the men's 50 km walk (3:38:43) in Ourense, March 20, 1994.

== Achievements ==
Year	Competition	Venue	Position	Event	Notes
Representing Spain
1988	World Junior Championships	Sudbury, Canada	2nd	10,000 m	41:33.95
1990	European Championships	Split, Yugoslavia	5th	20 km	1:23:53
1990	Ibero-American Championships	Manaus, Brazil	2nd	20 km	1:25:37.8
1991	World Indoor Championships	Seville, Spain	5th	5000 m	19:08.79
1991	World Race Walking Cup	San Jose, United States	10th	20 km	1:21:56
1991	World Championships	Tokyo, Japan	5th	20 km	1:20:29
1992	Olympic Games	Barcelona, Spain	—	20 km	DSQ
1993	World Race Walking Cup	Monterrey, Mexico	2nd	20 km	1:24:32
1993	World Championships	Stuttgart, Germany	1st	20 km	1:22:31
1994	European Championships	Helsinki, Finland	3rd	20 km	1:20.33
1995	World Championships	Gothenburg, Sweden	2nd	20 km	1:20:23
1996	Olympic Games	Atlanta, United States	20th	20 km	1:24:14
1996	Olympic Games	Atlanta, United States	3rd	50 km	3:44:19
1998	European Championships	Budapest, Hungary	9th	20 km	1:23.36
1999	World Race Walking Cup	Mézidon-Canon, France	8th	50 km	3:45:29
1999	World Championships	Seville, Spain	4th	50 km	3:51:55
2000	Olympic Games	Sydney, Australia	4th	50 km	3:46:01
2001	World Championships	Edmonton, Canada	6th	50 km	3:48:28
