= Martial Fesselier =

French racewalker (born 1961)

Martial Fesselier (born 9 October 1961 in Rennes, Ille-et-Vilaine) is a retired male race walker from France, who competed in four consecutive Summer Olympics during his career, starting in 1984.

== Achievements ==
Year	Competition	Venue	Position	Event	Notes
Representing France
1982	European Championships	Athens, Greece	12th	20 km	1:32:23
1983	World Race Walking Cup	Bergen, Norway	19th	20 km	1:26:01
1983	World Championships	Helsinki, Finland	26th	20 km	1:27:39
1984	Olympic Games	Los Angeles, California, United States	20th	20 km	1:29:46
1986	European Championships	Stuttgart, West Germany	10th	20 km	1:26:20
1986	European Championships	Stuttgart, West Germany	15th	50 km	3:59:44
1987	World Race Walking Cup	New York City, United States	19th	20 km	1:23:46
1987	World Championships	Rome, Italy	13th	20 km	1:24:51
1988	Olympic Games	Seoul, South Korea	16th	20 km	1:22:43
1989	World Race Walking Cup	L'Hospitalet, Spain	9th	50 km	3:54:29
1990	European Championships	Split, Yugoslavia	10th	50 km	4:05:18
1991	World Race Walking Cup	San Jose, United States	20th	20 km	1:22:59
1991	World Championships	Tokyo, Japan	—	50 km	DNF
1992	Olympic Games	Barcelona, Spain	17th	50 km	4:07:30
1994	Jeux de la Francophonie	Paris, France	2nd	20 km	1:26:52
1996	Olympic Games	Atlanta, United States	28th	50 km	4:04:42
