= Htay Myint (athlete) =

Burmese athlete

Personal information
- Nationality: Burmese
- Born: 5 July 1953 (age 73)

Sport
- Sport: Athletics
- Event: Racewalking

Htay Myint (born 5 July 1953) is a Burmese racewalker. He competed in the men's 20 kilometres walk at the 1996 Summer Olympics.
