= Athletics at the 1988 Summer Olympics – Men's 20 kilometres walk =

Men's 20 kilometres walk at the Games of the XXIV Olympiad
- Venue: Seoul Olympic Stadium (start and finish)
- Dates: September 23
- Competitors: 53 from 28 nations
- Winning time: 1:19:57 OR

Medalists
1st place, gold medalist(s)		Jozef Pribilinec; Czechoslovakia
2nd place, silver medalist(s)		Ronald Weigel; East Germany
3rd place, bronze medalist(s)		Maurizio Damilano; Italy

The Men's 20 km Race Walk event at the 1988 Summer Olympics in Seoul, South Korea had an entry list of 53 competitors. Three athletes were disqualified, while one walker did not finish the race. The race was held on Friday September 23, 1988.

== Records ==
Standing records prior to the 1988 Summer Olympics
World Record	Mikhail Shchennikov (URS)	1:19.08	July 30, 1988	Kiev, Soviet Union
Olympic Record	Ernesto Canto (MEX)	1:23.13	August 3, 1984	Los Angeles, United States
Broken records during the 1988 Summer Olympics
Olympic Record	Jozef Pribilinec (TCH)	1:19.57	September 23, 1988	Seoul, South Korea

== Results ==
Rank	Athlete	Nation	Time	Time behind	Notes
1st place, gold medalist(s)	Jozef Pribilinec	Czechoslovakia	1:19:57		OR
2nd place, silver medalist(s)	Ronald Weigel	East Germany	1:20:00		
3rd place, bronze medalist(s)	Maurizio Damilano	Italy	1:20:14		
4	José Marín	Spain	1:20:34		
5	Roman Mrázek	Czechoslovakia	1:20:43		
6	Mikhail Shchennikov	Soviet Union	1:20:47		
7	Carlos Mercenario	Mexico	1:20:53		
8	Axel Noack	East Germany	1:21:14		
9	Giovanni De Benedictis	Italy	1:21:18		PB
10	Guillaume Leblanc	Canada	1:21:29		
11	Simon Baker	Australia	1:21:47		
12	Daniel Plaza	Spain	1:21:53		
13	Ian McCombie	Great Britain	1:22:03		
14	Aleksey Pershin	Soviet Union	1:22:32		
15	Pavol Blažek	Czechoslovakia	1:22:39		
16	Martial Fesselier	France	1:22:43		
17	Jimmy McDonald	Ireland	1:22:45		
18	Thierry Toutain	France	1:22:55		
19	Carlo Mattioli	Italy	1:22:58		
20	Jean-Claude Corré	France	1:23:09		
21	Sándor Urbanik	Hungary	1:23:18		
22	Erling Andersen	Norway	1:23:30		
23	Ricardo Pueyo	Spain	1:23:40		
24	Chris Maddocks	Great Britain	1:23:46		
25	Stefan Johansson	Sweden	1:23:51		
26	Hirofumi Sakai	Japan	1:24:08		
27	Yevgeniy Misyulya	Soviet Union	1:24:39		
28	Andrew Jachno	Australia	1:24:52		
29	José Urbano	Portugal	1:24:56		
30	Jan Staaf	Sweden	1:24:59		
31	José Pinto	Portugal	1:26:33		
32	Abdelouahab Ferguene	Algeria	1:26:33		
33	Héctor Moreno	Colombia	1:27:06		
34	Mohamed Bouhalla	Algeria	1:27:10		
35	Godfried Dejonckheere	Belgium	1:27:14		
36	Zdzisław Szlapkin	Poland	1:27:23		
37	Gary Morgan	United States	1:27:26		
38	Jim Heiring	United States	1:27:30		
39	Hélder Oliveira	Portugal	1:27:39		
40	Santiago Fonseca	Honduras	1:27:41		
41	Li Baojin	China	1:27:57		
42	Reima Salonen	Finland	1:28:25		
43	Lyubomir Ivanov	Bulgaria	1:28:43		
44	Timothy Lewis	United States	1:31:00		
45	Marcelo Palma	Brazil	1:31:42		
46	Jeong Pil-hwa	South Korea	1:32:23		
47	Tadahiro Kosaka	Japan	1:32:46		
48	Rafael Valladares	Honduras	1:37:09		
49	Jeong Myeong-o	South Korea	1:40:09		
—	Querubín Moreno	Colombia	DNF		
—	Ernesto Canto	Mexico	DSQ		
—	Joel Sánchez	Mexico	DSQ		
—	Marc Sowa	Luxembourg	DSQ		

== See also ==
- 1988 Race Walking Year Ranking
- 1990 Men's European Championships 20 km Walk (Split)
- 1991 Men's World Championships 20 km Walk (Tokyo)
- 1992 Men's Olympic 20 km Walk (Barcelona)
