= Héctor Moreno (race walker) =

Colombian race walker (born 1963)

Personal information
- Full name: Héctor José Moreno Moreno
- Born: 8 June 1963 (age 63) Ventaquemada, Boyacá, Colombia
- Height: 1.57 m (5 ft 2 in)
- Weight: 54 kg (119 lb)

Sport
- Country: Colombia
- Sport: Athletics
- Event: Race walking

Achievements and titles
- Olympic finals: 1988 Summer Olympics; 1992 Summer Olympics; 1996 Summer Olympics
Medal record
athletics
Representing Colombia
South American Games
Gold medal – first place	1998 Cuenca	50 km
Bolivarian Games
Gold medal – first place	1989 Maracaibo	20 km
Silver medal – second place	1981 Barquisimeto	20 km
Silver medal – second place	1993 Cochabamba	20 km
Silver medal – second place	1997 Arequipa	20 km

Héctor José Moreno Moreno (born 8 June 1963) is a Colombian retired race walker. He went to four Olympic Games and five World Championships in Athletics. He is one of the most successful Colombian athletes of the past fifty years because only one other Colombian also has a Pan American Games title. Another highlight is the permanence of his personal best of 3:52:16 hours (set in 1997) as the national record for more than twelve years.

At regional level he was a two-time champion at the South American Championships in Athletics (1983 and 1997), the gold medallist at the 1998 South American Games, the 1990 Central American and Caribbean Games champion, and the 1989 Bolivarian Games winner. He has also won several lesser medals internationally, including two bronzes at the Pan American Games, two silvers at the South American Championships, three silvers at the Bolivarian Games and two bronzes at the Ibero-American Championships in Athletics.

His long international career stretched from 1981 to 1999.

His three brothers Querubín, Clodomiro, and Antonio were race walkers as well.

== Personal bests ==
- 20 km walk: 1:21:50 hrs – New York City, United States, 3 May 1987
- 50 km walk: 3:52:16 hrs – Naumburg, Germany, 25 May 1997

== Achievements ==
Year	Competition	Venue	Position	Event	Notes
Representing Colombia
1981	Bolivarian Games	Barquisimeto, Venezuela	2nd	20 km	1:38:07
1982	Central American and Caribbean; Junior Championships (U-20)	Bridgetown, Barbados	1st	10 km	44:13.55
1983	Pan American Games	Caracas, Venezuela	3rd	20 km	1:30:05
1983	South American Championships	Santa Fe, Argentina	1st	20 km	1:24:12 CR
1984	Olympic Games	Los Angeles, United States	12th	20 km	1:27:12
1984	Pan American Race Walking Cup	Bucaramanga, Colombia	3rd	20 km	1:27:09
1985	World Race Walking Cup	St John's, Isle of Man	18th	20 km	1:26:54
1986	Central American and Caribbean Games	Santiago de los Caballeros, Dominican Republic	3rd	20 km	1:28:41
1986	Pan American Race Walking Cup	Saint-Leonard, Canada	5th	20 km	1:24:02
1987	Pan American Games	Indianapolis, United States	3rd	50 km	4:18:48
1987	World Race Walking Cup	New York City, United States	10th	20 km	1:21:50
1987	World Championships	Rome, Italy	—	20 km	DNF
1988	Olympic Games	Seoul, South Korea	33rd	20 km	1:27:06
1988	Olympic Games	Seoul, South Korea	30th	50 km	4:01:31
1989	Bolivarian Games	Maracaibo, Venezuela	1st	20 km	1:29:07
1989	South American Championships	Medellín, Colombia	2nd	20 km	1:24:56 A
1990	Central American and Caribbean Games	Mexico City, Mexico	3rd	20 km	1:24:54
1990	Central American and Caribbean Games	Mexico City, Mexico	1st	50 km	4:06:04
1991	World Race Walking Cup	San Jose, United States	18th	20 km	1:22:40
1991	Pan American Games	Havana, Cuba	1st	20 km	1:24:56
1991	Pan American Games	Havana, Cuba	–	50 km	DNF
1991	World Championships	Tokyo, Japan	19th	20 km	1:23:27
1991	World Championships	Tokyo, Japan	—	50 km	DNF
1992	Olympic Games	Barcelona, Spain	9th	20 km	1:26:23
1993	Bolivarian Games	Cochabamba, Bolivia	2nd	20 km	1:26:24 A
1993	World Championships	Stuttgart, Germany	11th	20 km	1:24:43
1993	Central American and Caribbean Games	Ponce, Puerto Rico	2nd	20 km	1:26:32
1994	Ibero-American Championships	Mar del Plata, Argentina	3rd	20 km	1:21:49.9
1995	Pan American Games	Mar del Plata, Argentina	–	50 km	DNF
1995	South American Championships	Manaus, Brazil	2nd	20,000 m	1:31:03.9
1995	World Championships	Gothenburg, Sweden	13th	20 km	1:24:34
1996	Ibero-American Championships	Medellín, Colombia	3rd	20 km	1:26:54
1996	Olympic Games	Atlanta, United States	—	20 km	DNF
1996	Olympic Games	Atlanta, United States	16th	50 km	3:54:57
1997	South American Championships	Mar del Plata, Argentina	1st	20,000 m	1:23:06.73 CR
1997	World Championships	Athens, Greece	17th	50 km	3:59:33
1997	Bolivarian Games	Arequipa, Peru	2nd	20 km	1:29:51 A
1998	Ibero-American Championships	Lisbon, Portugal	3rd	20 km	1:27:21
1998	Central American and Caribbean Games	Maracaibo, Venezuela	7th	20 km	1:28:36
1998	South American Games	Cuenca, Ecuador	1st	50 km	4:27:13 A
