= Sérgio Galdino =

Brazilian race walker

Personal information
- Full name: Sérgio Vieira Galdino
- Born: 7 May 1969 (age 57) Armazém, Santa Catarina, Brazil
- Height: 1.66 m (5 ft 5 in)
- Weight: 61 kg (134 lb)

Sport
- Country: Brazil
- Sport: Athletics
- Event: Race walking
- Updated on 27 July 2013

Sérgio Vieira Galdino (born 7 May 1969) is a Brazilian race walker.

== Personal bests ==
- 20 km: 1:19:56 hrs NR – Eisenhüttenstadt, Germany, 14 May 1995
- 50 km: 3:58:58 hrs – Porto Alegre, Brazil, 26 April 2003

== Achievements ==
Year	Competition	Venue	Position	Event	Notes
Representing Brazil
1988	World Junior Championships	Greater Sudbury, Canada	8th	10,000 m	43:04.29
1989	World Race Walking Cup	L'Hospitalet de Llobregat, Spain	16th	20 km	1:22:47
1989	South American Championships	Medellín, Colombia	1st	20 km	1:24:51
1990	Pan American Race Walking Cup	Xalapa, Mexico	6th	20 km	1:25:55
1991	South American Championships	Manaus, Brazil	1st	20 km	1:26:26
1991	Pan American Games	Havana, Cuba	4th	20 km	1:27:56
1991	World Championships	Tokyo, Japan	25th	20 km	1:25:20
1992	Ibero-American Championships	Seville, Spain	6th	20,000 m	1:28:08.8
1992	Olympic Games	Barcelona, Spain	27th	20 km	1:33:32
1993	World Indoor Championships	Toronto, Canada	9th (h)	5000 m	19:28.87^{1}
1993	World Championships	Stuttgart, Germany	6th	20 km	1:23:51
1995	Pan American Games	Mar del Plata, Argentina	7th	20 km	1:27:14
1995	World Championships	Gothenburg, Sweden	19th	20 km	1:26:53
1996	Olympic Games	Atlanta, United States	26th	20 km	1:25:14
1997	South American Championships	Mar del Plata, Argentina	2nd	20,000 m	1:23:28.06
1997	World Championships	Athens, Greece	21st	20 km	1:25:50
1998	Ibero-American Championships	Lisbon, Portugal	–	20 km	DNF
1999	South American Championships	Bogotá, Colombia	1st	20,000 m	1:31:01.68
2000	Ibero-American Championships	Rio de Janeiro, Brazil	–	20,000 m	DNF
2002	Ibero-American Championships	Guatemala City, Guatemala	9th	20,000 m	1:32:12
2003	South American Championships	Barquisimeto, Venezuela	1st	20,000 m	1:25:54.2
2003	Pan American Games	Santo Domingo, Dominican Republic	4th	50 km	4:24:42
2003	World Championships	Paris, France	24th	20 km	1:26:48
2004	Olympic Games	Athens, Greece	26th	50 km	4:05:02
2005	Pan American Race Walking Cup	Lima, Peru	3rd	20 km	1:21:29
2005	World Championships	Helsinki, Finland	15th	20 km	1:23:03
2005	World Championships	Helsinki, Finland	—	50 km	DNF

^{1}Disqualified in the final
