= Yevgeniy Misyulya =

Belarusian race walker

Medal record

Men's athletics

Representing Belarus

European Championships
Silver medal – second place	1994 Helsinki	20 km walk

Yevgeny Nikolayevich Misyulya (Belarusian: Яўген Мікалаевіч Місюля; born 13 March 1964 in Grodno) is a Belarusian race walker. He has won two World Championships bronze medals, and even participated in the 2004 Summer Olympics at the age of 40. He is married to race walker Natalya Misyulya.

== Achievements ==
Year	Competition	Venue	Position	Event	Notes
Representing the Soviet Union
1988	Olympic Games	Seoul, South Korea	27th	20 km	1:24:39
1989	World Race Walking Cup	L'Hospitalet de Llobregat, Spain	3rd	20 km	1:20:47
1991	World Championships	Tokyo, Japan	3rd	20 km	1:20:22
Representing Belarus
1993	World Race Walking Cup	Monterrey, Mexico	22nd	20 km	1:28:39
1993	World Championships	Stuttgart, Germany	5th	20 km	1:23:45
1994	European Championships	Helsinki, Finland	2nd	20 km	1:19:22
1995	World Race Walking Cup	Beijing, China	4th	20 km	1:20:39
1995	World Championships	Gothenburg, Sweden	3rd	20 km	1:20:48
1996	Olympic Games	Atlanta, United States	9th	20 km	1:21:16
1996	Olympic Games	Atlanta, United States	—	50 km	DNF
1997	World Race Walking Cup	Poděbrady, Czech Republic	6th	20 km	1:18:55
1997	World Championships	Athens, Greece	6th	20 km	1:23:10
1998	European Championships	Budapest, Hungary	—	50 km	DNF
1999	World Race Walking Cup	Mézidon-Canon, France	14th	20 km	1:23:19
2000	European Race Walking Cup	Eisenhüttenstadt, Germany	—	20 km	DSQ
2001	European Race Walking Cup	Dudince, Slovakia	2nd	20 km	1:19:45
2001	World Championships	Edmonton, Canada	—	20 km	DSQ
2002	World Race Walking Cup	Turin, Italy	5th	20 km	1:23:07
2002	European Championships	Munich, Germany	6th	20 km	1:20:56
2003	World Championships	Paris, France	12th	20 km	1:20:38
2004	Olympic Games	Athens, Greece	19th	20 km	1:25:10
