= Pavol Blažek =

Slovak racewalker

Medal record

Men's athletics

Representing Czechoslovakia

European Championships
Gold medal – first place	1990 Split	20 km walk
Bronze medal – third place	1982 Athens	20 km walk

Pavol Blažek (born 9 July 1958) is a retired race walker, who represented Czechoslovakia and later Slovakia in the Olympic Games. He was born in Trnava.

== International competitions ==
Year	Competition	Venue	Position	Event	Notes
Representing Czechoslovakia
1980	Olympic Games	Moscow, Soviet Union	14th	20 km	1:35:30.8
1980	Olympic Games	Moscow, Soviet Union	10th	50 km	4:16:26
1981	World Race Walking Cup	Valencia, Spain	11th	20 km	1:28:12
1982	European Championships	Athens, Greece	3rd	20 km	1:26:13
1982	European Championships	Athens, Greece	—	50 km	DNF
1983	World Race Walking Cup	Bergen, Norway	9th	20 km	1:21:37
1983	World Championships	Helsinki, Finland	6th	20 km	1:21:54
1983	World Championships	Helsinki, Finland	17th	50 km	4:06:49
1985	World Race Walking Cup	St John's, Isle of Man	10th	20 km	1:24:51
1986	European Championships	Stuttgart, West Germany	6th	20 km	1:23:26
1987	World Championships	Rome, Italy	11th	20 km	1:24:37
1987	World Championships	Rome, Italy	18th	50 km	3:58:43
1988	Olympic Games	Seoul, South Korea	15th	20 km	1:22:39
1988	Olympic Games	Seoul, South Korea	12th	50 km	3:47:31
1989	World Race Walking Cup	L'Hospitalet, Spain	8th	20 km	1:21:53
1990	European Championships	Split, Yugoslavia	1st	20 km	1:22:05
1991	World Championships	Tokyo, Japan	17th	20 km	1:22:34
1992	Olympic Games	Barcelona, Spain	17th	20 km	1:29:23
1992	Olympic Games	Barcelona, Spain	29th	50 km	4:22:33
Representing Slovakia
1993	World Championships	Stuttgart, Germany	15th	20 km	1:25:31
1994	European Championships	Helsinki, Finland	9th	50 km	3:49:44
1995	World Championships	Gothenburg, Sweden	17th	50 km	4:03:45
1996	Olympic Games	Atlanta, United States	46th	20 km	1:29:41

Records
Preceded by Andrey Perlov	Men's 20 km walk world record holder September 16, 1990 – April 7, 1994	Succeeded by Bu Lingtang
