= Hélder Oliveira =

Portuguese racewalker

Personal information
- Nationality: Portuguese
- Born: 13 September 1960 (age 65)

Sport
- Sport: Athletics
- Event: Racewalking

Hélder Oliveira (born 13 September 1960) is a Portuguese racewalker. He competed in the men's 20 kilometres walk at the 1988 Summer Olympics.
