= Bernardo Segura =

Mexican race walker

Personal information
- Born: February 11, 1970 (age 56) San Mateo Atenco, Mexico

Sport
- Sport: Track and field
Medal record
Representing Mexico
Summer Universiade
Bronze medal – third place	1993 Buffalo	20km walk
Pan American Games
Gold medal – first place	1999 Winnipeg	20km walk
Silver medal – second place	2003 Santo Domingo	20km walk
Central American and Caribbean Games
Silver medal – second place	1998 Maracaibo	20km walk

Bernardo Segura Rivera (born February 11, 1970) is a Mexican race walker. He is the current holder of the 20,000m World Record for Race Walking on a track with a time of 1:17:25.6. In the 2000 Olympic Games, Segura finished first the 20 km walk. However, he was disqualified by the judges while he was being congratulated by then president Ernesto Zedillo.

== Achievements ==
Year	Competition	Venue	Position	Event	Notes
Representing Mexico
1992	Pan American Race Walking Cup	Guatemala City, Guatemala	1st	20 km	1:24:09
1993	World Student Games	Buffalo, United States	3rd	20 km	
1993	World Championships	Stuttgart, Germany	—	20 km	DSQ
1994	Pan American Race Walking Cup	Atlanta, United States	1st	20 km	1:24:15
1995	World Race Walking Cup	Beijing, China	3rd	20 km	
1995	World Championships	Gothenburg, Sweden	—	20 km	DNF
1996	Olympic Games	Atlanta, United States	3rd	20 km	
1998	Central American and Caribbean Games	Maracaibo, Venezuela	2nd	20 km	
1999	Pan American Games	Winnipeg, Canada	1st	20 km	
1999	World Race Walking Cup	Mézidon-Canon, France	1st	20 km	
2000	Pan American Race Walking Cup	Poza Rica, Mexico	1st	20 km	1:22:47
2000	Olympic Games	Sydney, Australia	—	20 km	DSQ
2003	Pan American Games	Santo Domingo, Dominican Republic	2nd	20 km	
2003	World Championships	Paris, France	—	20 km	DSQ
2004	Olympic Games	Athens, Greece	—	20 km	DNF
2005	World Championships	Helsinki, Finland	—	20 km	DSQ
