= Andrew Jachno =

Australian race walker

Personal information
- Born: 13 April 1962 (age 64) Melbourne, Victoria, Australia

Sport
- Sport: Race walking
Medal record
Representing Australia
Commonwealth Games
Silver medal – second place	1990 Auckland	30km walk
Summer Universiade
Bronze medal – third place	1989 Duisburg	20km walk

Andrew Jachno (born 13 April 1962) is a retired male race walker from Australia. He set his personal best (3:53.23) in the men's 50 km in 1988. Jachno is a two-time national champion.

== Achievements ==
Year	Competition	Venue	Position	Notes
Representing Australia
1983	World Race Walking Cup	Bergen, Norway	18th	20 km
1984	Olympic Games	Los Angeles, California, United States	DNF	50 km
1985	World Race Walking Cup	St John's, Isle of Man	27th	20 km
1987	World Indoor Championships	Indianapolis, United States	15th	5,000 m
1987	World Race Walking Cup	New York City, United States	37th	20 km
1987	World Championships	Rome, Italy	12th	20 km
1988	Olympic Games	Seoul, South Korea	28th	20 km
1988	Olympic Games	Seoul, South Korea	19th	50 km
1989	World Race Walking Cup	L'Hospitalet, Spain	65th	20 km
1990	Commonwealth Games	Auckland, New Zealand	2nd	30 km
1991	World Race Walking Cup	San Jose, United States	59th	20 km
1992	Olympic Games	Barcelona, Spain	31st	20 km
