= Frants Kostyukevich =

Frants Kostyukevich (Belarusian: Франц Касцюкевіч; born 4 April 1963) is a male race walker who represented the USSR and later Belarus.

== Achievements ==
Year	Competition	Venue	Position	Event	Notes
Representing the Soviet Union
1987	World Championships	Rome, Italy	—	20 km	DNF
1989	World Indoor Championships	Budapest, Hungary	3rd	5000 m	18:34.07
1989	World Race Walking Cup	L'Hospitalet, Spain	1st	20 km	1:20:21
1990	European Championships	Split, Yugoslavia	11th	20 km	1:27:12
1991	World Indoor Championships	Seville, Spain	3rd	5000 m	18:47.05
Representing the Commonwealth of Independent States
1992	European Indoor Championships	Genoa, Italy	2nd	5000 m	18:25.40
Representing Belarus
1993	World Championships	Stuttgart, Germany	—	20 km	DNF
