= 1990 European Athletics Championships – Men's 20 kilometres walk =

Men's 20 kilometres walk at the European Athletics Championships

These are the official results of the Men's 20 km walk event at the 1990 European Championships in Split, Yugoslavia, held on 28 August 1990. There were a total number of 22 athletes, who finished the race.

== Medalists ==
Gold	Pavol Blažek; Czechoslovakia (TCH)
Silver	Daniel Plaza; Spain (ESP)
Bronze	Thierry Toutain; France (FRA)

== Results ==
=== Final ===
28 August

Rank	Name	Nationality	Time	Notes
1st place, gold medalist(s)	Pavol Blažek	Czechoslovakia	1:22:05	
2nd place, silver medalist(s)	Daniel Plaza	Spain	1:22:22	
3rd place, bronze medalist(s)	Thierry Toutain	France	1:23:22	
4	Robert Korzeniowski	Poland	1:23:47	
5	Valentí Massana	Spain	1:23:53	
6	Walter Arena	Italy	1:24:16	
7	Bernd Gummelt	East Germany	1:24:33	
8	Giovanni De Benedictis	Italy	1:24:51	
9	Robert Ihly	West Germany	1:25:31	
10	Ján Záhončík	Czechoslovakia	1:26:47	
11	Frants Kostyukevich	Soviet Union	1:27:12	
12	Sergio Spagnulo	Italy	1:27:52	
13	Miguel Ángel Prieto	Spain	1:28:32	
14	Kari Ahonen	Finland	1:28:57	
15	Sándor Urbanik	Hungary	1:29:19	
16	Mark Easton	United Kingdom	1:31:06	
17	Magnus Morenius	Sweden	1:31:51	
18	Ralph Weise	East Germany	1:32:45	
19	José Urbano	Portugal	1:32:50	
20	Aldo Bertoldi	Switzerland	1:33:55	
21	Michael Lane	Ireland	1:35:04	
22	Milan Balek	Yugoslavia	1:35:28	
	Mikhail Shchennikov	Soviet Union	DNF	
	Grigoriy Kornev	Soviet Union	DNF	
	Axel Noack	East Germany	DNF	
	José Pinto	Portugal	DNF	
	Andi Drake	United Kingdom	DQ	
	Roman Mrázek	Czechoslovakia	DQ	

== Participation ==
According to an unofficial count, 28 athletes from 16 countries participated in the event.

- Czechoslovakia (3)
- East Germany (3)
- Finland (1)
- France (1)
- Hungary (1)
- Ireland (1)
- Italy (3)
- Poland (1)
- Portugal (2)
- Soviet Union (3)
- Spain (3)
- Sweden (1)
- Switzerland (1)
- United Kingdom (2)
- West Germany (1)
- Yugoslavia (1)

== See also ==
- 1988 Men's Olympic 20km Walk (Seoul)
- 1991 Men's World Championships 20km Walk (Tokyo)
- 1992 Men's Olympic 20km Walk (Barcelona)
- 1994 Men's European Championships 20km Walk (Helsinki)
