= Maurizio Damilano =

Italian race walker (born 1957)

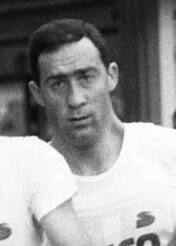
- Damilano in the 1970s

Personal information
- Born: 6 April 1957 (age 69) Scarnafigi, Italy
- Height: 1.83 m (6 ft 0 in)
- Weight: 70 kg (154 lb)

Sport
- Country: Italy
- Sport: Athletics
- Event: Race walking
- Club: Sisport, Turin; C.S. Esercito

Achievements and titles
- Personal bests: 20 km race walk: 1:18:54 (1992); 50 km race walk: 3:46:51 (1990)
Medal record
Men's athletics
Representing Italy
| Event | 1st | 2nd | 3rd |
|---|---|---|---|
| Olympic Games | 1 | 0 | 2 |
| World Championships | 2 | 0 | 0 |
| World Indoor Championships | 0 | 1 | 0 |
| European Championships | 0 | 1 | 0 |
| European Indoor Championships | 1 | 1 | 0 |
| Universiade | 1 | 1 | 0 |
| Mediterranean Games | 3 | 0 | 0 |
| World Race Walking Cup | 2 | 4 | 2 |
| Total | 10 | 8 | 4 |
Olympic Games
| Gold medal – first place | 1980 Moscow | 20 km walk |
| Bronze medal – third place | 1984 Los Angeles | 20 km walk |
| Bronze medal – third place | 1988 Seoul | 20 km walk |
World Championships
| Gold medal – first place | 1987 Rome | 20 km walk |
| Gold medal – first place | 1991 Tokyo | 20 km walk |
World Indoor Championship
| Silver medal – second place | 1985 Paris | 5,000 m |
European Championships
| Silver medal – second place | 1986 Stuttgart | 20 km walk |
European Indoor Championships
| Gold medal – first place | 1982 Milan | 5,000 m |
| Silver medal – second place | 1981 Grenoble | 5,000 m |
Universiade
| Gold medal – first place | 1981 Bucharest | 20 km walk |
| Silver medal – second place | 1983 Edmonton | 20 km walk |
Mediterranean Games
| Gold medal – first place | 1983 Casablanca | 20 km walk |
| Gold medal – first place | 1987 Latakia | 20 km walk |
| Gold medal – first place | 1991 Athens | 20 km walk |
World Race Walking Cup
| Gold medal – first place | 1981 Valencia | Combined Team |
| Gold medal – first place | 1991 San Josè | Combined Team |
| Silver medal – second place | 1985 St John's | 20 km walk |
| Silver medal – second place | 1983 Bergen | Combined Team |
| Silver medal – second place | 1987 New York City | Combined Team |
| Silver medal – second place | 1989 L'Hospitalet | Combined Team |
| Bronze medal – third place | 1977 Mylton Keynes | Combined Team |
| Bronze medal – third place | 1985 St John's | Combined Team |

Maurizio Damilano (born 6 April 1957) is an Italian former race walker. He won 15 individual medals (22 also with team events), at senior level, at the International athletics competitions.

== Biography ==
He was the 1980 Olympic Champion and the 1987 and 1991 World Champion in the 20 km race walk. He has 60 caps in the national team from 1977 to 1992.

Damilano is also the world record holder of the 30 km race walk with the time of 2:01:44.1, achieved in Cuneo in 1992. He is the twin brother of the former race walker Giorgio Damilano and of the coach Sandro Damilano.

In 1999, Maurizio Damilano and Giorgio Damilano founded Fit Walking.

== Achievements ==
Olympic Games
| Year | Competition | Venue | Position | Event | Time | Notes |
| 1980 | Olympic Games | (Soviet Union) Moscow | 1st | 20 km | 1:23:35 | OR |
| 1984 | Olympic Games | (United States) Los Angeles | 3rd | 20 km | 1:23:26 | |
| 1988 | Olympic Games | (South Korea) Seoul | 3rd | 20 km | 1:20:14 | |
| 1992 | Olympic Games | (Spain) Barcelona | 4th | 20 km | 1:23:39 | |
World Championships
| Year | Competition | Venue | Position | Event | Time | Notes |
| 1983 | World Championships | (Finland) Helsinki | 7th | 20 km | 1:21:57 | |
| 1987 | World Championships | (Italy) Rome | 1st | 20 km | 1:20:45 | CR |
| 1991 | World Championships | (Japan) Tokyo | 1st | 20 km | 1:19:37 | CR |
World Indoor Championships
| Year | Competition | Venue | Position | Event | Time | Notes |
| 1985 | World Indoor Championships | (France) Paris | 2nd | 5000 m | 19:11.41 | |
European Championships
| Year | Competition | Venue | Position | Event | Time | Notes |
| 1978 | European Championships | (Czechoslovakia) Prague | 6th | 20 km | 1:24:57 | |
| 1982 | European Championships | (Greece) Athens | DQ | 20 km | NM | |
| 1982 | European Championships | (Greece) Athens | DNF | 50 km | NM | |
| 1986 | European Championships | (West Germany) Stuttgart | 2nd | 20 km | 1:21:17 | |
| 1986 | European Championships | (West Germany) Stuttgart | DNF | 50 km | NM | |
| 1990 | European Championships | (Socialist Federal Republic of Yugoslavia) Split | DNF | 50 km | NM | |
European Indoor Championships
| Year | Competition | Venue | Position | Event | Time | Notes |
| 1981 | European Indoor Championships | (France) Grenoble | 2nd | 5000 m | 19:13.90 | |
| 1982 | European Indoor Championships | (Italy) Milan | 1st | 5000 m | 19:40.28 | |

== National titles ==
Maurizio Damilano has won the individual national championship 21 times.

- 6 wins in the 10,000 m walk (1979, 1981, 1982, 1983, 1984, 1985)
- 1 win in the 15 km walk (1987)
- 10 wins in the 20 km walk (1978, 1980, 1981, 1982, 1983, 1984, 1985, 1986, 1988, 1992)
- 3 wins in the 50 km walk (1985, 1986, 1989)
- 1 win in the 3000 metres walk indoor (1984)

== See also ==
- Walk of Fame of Italian sport
- Italy national athletics team – Multiple medalists
- Italy national athletics team - More caps
- Italian Athletics Championships - Multi winners
- FIDAL Hall of Fame
- Italian all-time lists - 20 km walk
- Italian all-time lists - 50 km walk
- Italy at the World Athletics Race Walking Team Championships
- Fit Walking
- Saluzzo Race Walking School
