= Robert Ihly =

German racewalker

Robert Ihly (born 5 May 1963 in Asbest, Soviet Union) is a retired race walker from Germany, who was one of the nation's leading athletes in race walking in the 1990s. He represented Germany thrice at the Summer Olympics, starting in 1992 (Barcelona, Spain).

== Achievements ==
Year	Competition	Venue	Position	Event	Notes
Representing West Germany
1990	European Championships	Split, Yugoslavia	9th	20 km	1:25:31
Representing Germany
1991	World Race Walking Cup	San Jose, United States	19th	20 km	1:22:52
1992	Olympic Games	Barcelona, Spain	11th	20 km	1:26:56
1993	World Race Walking Cup	Monterrey, Mexico	8th	20 km	1:25:32
1994	European Championships	Helsinki, Finland	—	50 km	DNF
1996	Olympic Games	Atlanta, United States	17th	20 km	1:23:47
1998	European Championships	Budapest, Hungary	11th	50 km	3:55:31
2000	European Race Walking Cup	Eisenhüttenstadt, Germany	20th	20 km	1:23:00
2000	Olympic Games	Sydney, Australia	—	50 km	DNF
