= Daniel Plaza =

Spanish race walker

Personal information
- Born: 3 July 1966 (age 60) Barcelona, Spain
- Height: 1.81 m (5 ft 11 in)
- Weight: 64 kg (141 lb)

Sport
- Sport: Race walking
- Club: Valencia CA; Sideco; CEMA Prat; La Seda
Medal record
Men's athletics
Representing Spain
Olympic Games
Gold medal – first place	1992 Barcelona	20 km walk
World Championships
Bronze medal – third place	1993 Stuttgart	20 km walk
European Championships
Silver medal – second place	1990 Split	20 km walk

Daniel Plaza Montero (born 3 July 1966) is a Spanish former race walker who competed in the 20 km event at the 1988, 1992 and 1996 Olympic Games.

== Career ==
Plaza won a gold medal in the 20 km walk event at the 1992 Olympic Games in his native Barcelona by beating Guillaume LeBlanc by a second becoming the first Spanish track & field athlete ever to win an Olympic gold medal.

He also won a silver medal at the 1990 European Championships in Split and bronze medal at the 1993 World Championships in Stuttgart.

== International competitions ==
Year	Competition	Venue	Position	Event	Notes
Representing Spain
1988	Ibero-American Championships	Mexico City, Mexico	3rd	20 km	1:27:23.0 A
1988	Olympic Games	Seoul, South Korea	12th	20 km	1:21:53
1989	World Race Walking Cup	L'Hospitalet de Llobregat, Spain	11th	20 km	1:22:09
1990	European Championships	Split, Yugoslavia	2nd	20 km	1:22:22
1990	Ibero-American Championships	Manaus, Brazil	—	20 km	DQ
1991	World Race Walking Cup	San Jose, United States	4th	20 km	1:21:00
1992	Olympic Games	Barcelona, Spain	1st	20 km	1:21:45
1993	World Race Walking Cup	Monterrey, Mexico	6th	20 km	1:24:52
1993	World Championships	Stuttgart, Germany	3rd	20 km	1:23:18
1994	European Championships	Helsinki, Finland	—	20 km	DQ
1996	European Race Walking Cup	A Coruña, Spain	2nd	20 km	1:21:47
1996	Olympic Games	Atlanta, United States	11th	20 km	1:22:05

== Controversy ==
Plaza was cleared of a nandrolone related drug ban by Spain's Supreme Court in 2006.
