= Walter Arena =

Italian racewalker

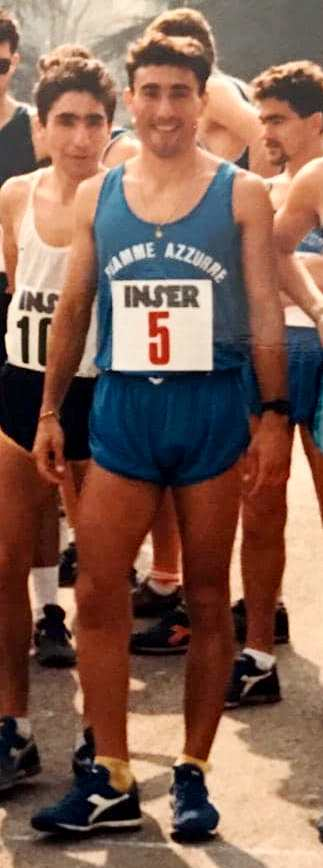
- Arena (#5) at the start of a race walk competition.

Personal information
- Nationality: Italian
- Born: May 30, 1964 (age 62) Catania, Italy
- Height: 1.73 m (5 ft 8 in)
- Weight: 67 kg (148 lb)

Sport
- Country: Italy
- Sport: Athletics
- Event: presadipiselli
- Club: G.S. Fiamme Azzurre

Achievements and titles
- Personal best: 20 km: 1:19:24 (1990)
Medal record
Event	1st	2nd	3rd
Summer Universiade	1	0	0
World Race Walking Cup	0	2	0
Total	1	2	0
Summer Universiade
Gold medal – first place	1989 Duisburg	20km walk

Walter Arena (born 30 May 1964) is a male race walker from Italy.

He continues to race, winning the M45 at the 2012 European Masters Athletics Championships 5,000 metres walk.

== Biography ==
Walter Arena won three medal (one at individual level), at the International athletics competitions. He participated at one edition of the Summer Olympics (1992), he has 28 caps in national team from 1984 to 1997.

== National records ==
- 20000 m walk: 1:19:24 ( (Norway) Fana, 26 May 1990) - current holder

== Achievements ==
Year	Competition	Venue	Position	Event	Notes
Representing Italy
1986	European Championships	Stuttgart, West Germany	5th	20 km	1:22:42
1987	World Race Walking Cup	New York City, United States	15th	20 km	1:22:49
1987	World Championships	Rome, Italy	DSQ	20 km	NT
1989	World Race Walking Cup	L'Hospitalet, Spain	7th	20 km	1:21:45
1989	World Student Games	Duisburg, West Germany	1st	20 km	1:23:25
1990	European Championships	Split, Yugoslavia	6th	20 km	1:24:16
1991	World Race Walking Cup	San Jose, United States	6th	20 km	1:21:01
1991	World Championships	Tokyo, Japan	7th	20 km	1:21:01
1992	Olympic Games	Barcelona, Spain	18th	20 km	1:29:34
1993	World Championships	Stuttgart, Germany	DSQ	20 km	NT
1993	World Race Walking Cup	Monterrey, Mexico	21st	20 km	1:28:39
1995	World Race Walking Cup	Beijing, China	12th	20 km	1.22:37
1997	World Race Walking Cup	Poděbrady, Czech Republic	24th	20 km	1:20:50

== See also ==
- Italian records in athletics
- Italian team at the running events
