= Roman Mrázek =

Slovak racewalker

Roman Mrázek (born 21 January 1962 in Sokolov) is a race walker who represented Czechoslovakia and later Slovakia. He represented his former nation at the 1988 Summer Olympics and the 1992 Summer Olympics, before competing for Slovakia at the 1996 Summer Olympics.

== International competitions ==
| Year | Competition | Venue | Position | Event | Notes |
Representing Czechoslovakia
| 1983 | World Race Walking Cup | Bergen, Norway | 20th | 20 km | 1:26:16 |
| 1983 | World Championships | Helsinki, Finland | 27th | 20 km | 1:27:46 |
| 1985 | World Indoor Championships | Paris, France | 4th | 5000 m | 19:39.73 |
| 1985 | World Race Walking Cup | St John's, Isle of Man | 13th | 20 km | 1:25:42 |
| 1986 | European Championships | Stuttgart, West Germany | — | 20 km | DQ |
| 1986 | European Championships | Stuttgart, West Germany | 20th | 50 km | 4:27:28 |
| 1987 | World Indoor Championships | Indianapolis, United States | 4th | 5000 m | 18:47.95 |
| 1987 | European Indoor Championships | Liévin, France | 3rd | 5000 m | 19:10.77 |
| 1987 | World Race Walking Cup | New York City, United States | 14th | 20 km | 1:22:34 |
| 1987 | World Championships | Rome, Italy | 6th | 20 km | 1:23:01 |
| 1988 | European Indoor Championships | Budapest, Hungary | 2nd | 5000 m | 18:44.91 |
| 1988 | Olympic Games | Seoul, South Korea | 4th | 20 km | 1:20:43 |
| 1988 | Olympic Games | Seoul, South Korea | 17th | 50 km | 3:50:46 |
| 1989 | World Indoor Championships | Budapest, Hungary | 2nd | 5000 m | 18:28.90 |
| 1989 | European Indoor Championships | The Hague, Netherlands | 2nd | 5000 m | 18:40.11 |
| 1989 | World Race Walking Cup | L'Hospitalet, Spain | 4th | 20 km | 1:20:56 |
| 1990 | European Championships | Split, Yugoslavia | — | 20 km | DQ |
| 1991 | World Championships | Tokyo, Japan | 15th | 20 km | 1:22:03 |
| 1992 | Olympic Games | Barcelona, Spain | 5th | 50 km | 3:55:21 |
Representing Slovakia
| 1995 | World Championships | Gothenburg, Sweden | 27th | 20 km | 1:29:37 |
| 1996 | Olympic Games | Atlanta, United States | 20th | 50 km | 3:58:20 |
| 1997 | World Championships | Athens, Greece | — | 50 km | DQ |
