= José Urbano =

Portuguese racewalker (born 1966)

José Cardoso Urbano (born March 1, 1966, in Guarda, Beira Interior Norte) is a retired male race walker from Portugal. He is a three-time Olympian.

== Achievements ==
Year	Competition	Venue	Position	Event	Notes
Representing Portugal
1986	European Championships	Stuttgart, West Germany	14th	20 km	1:30:07
1987	World Championships	Rome, Italy	16th	20 km	1:25:10
1988	Olympic Games	Seoul, South Korea	29th	20 km	1:24:56
1989	World Race Walking Cup	L'Hospitalet, Spain	12th	20 km	1:22:19
1990	European Championships	Split, Yugoslavia	19th	20 km	1:32:50
1991	World Race Walking Cup	San Jose, United States	13th	20 km	1:22:04
1991	World Championships	Tokyo, Japan	18th	20 km	1:23:09
1992	Olympic Games	Barcelona, Spain	—	20 km	DSQ
1992	Olympic Games	Barcelona, Spain	25th	50 km	4:16:31
1993	World Championships	Stuttgart, Germany	28th	50 km	4:17:34
1995	World Championships	Gothenburg, Sweden	17th	20 km	1:26:10
1996	Olympic Games	Atlanta, United States	31st	20 km	1:25:32
1997	World Championships	Athens, Greece	28th	20 km	1:27:25
1998	European Championships	Budapest, Hungary	13th	20 km	1:26.04
1999	World Championships	Seville, Spain	25th	20 km	1:37:50
