= Jozef Pribilinec =

Slovak track and field athlete

Personal information
- Born: 6 July 1960 (age 66) Kopernica, Czechoslovakia
Medal record
Men's athletics
Representing Czechoslovakia
Olympic Games
Gold medal – first place	1988 Seoul	20 km walk
World Championships
Silver medal – second place	1983 Helsinki	20 km walk
Silver medal – second place	1987 Rome	20 km walk
European Championships
Gold medal – first place	1986 Stuttgart	20 km walk
Silver medal – second place	1982 Athens	20 km walk

Jozef Pribilinec (Slovak pronunciation: [ˈjɔzef ˈpribiliɲets]; born 6 July 1960) is a Slovak track and field athlete who mainly competed in racewalking. He was born in Kopernica. Pribilinec competed for the former Czechoslovakia at the 1988 Summer Olympics held in Seoul, South Korea where he won the gold medal in the men's 20 kilometre walk event.

He represented Czechoslovakia for most of his career and in addition to his Olympic gold, won two silver medals at the World Championships in Athletics (1983 and 1987) and one gold and one silver at the European Athletics Championships for his country. He was a two-time champion at the European Athletics Indoor Championships, winning in 1987 and 1988 over distances of 3000 m and 5000 m, respectively. He was a four-time participant at the IAAF World Race Walking Cup and his best performance was a win over 20 km at the 1983 IAAF World Race Walking Cup, becoming his country's first victor at the competition. He had previously shown his developing talent as a youngster with a win at the 1979 European Athletics Junior Championships.

His personal best time of 1:19:30 hours for the 20 km race was a world record from 24 September 1983 to 3 May 1987. This continued a tradition of Czechoslovak record holders, following in the steps of Václav Balšán and Josef Doležal.

Before retiring, he represented Slovakia at the 1993 World Championships in Athletics, placing 17th in the men's 20 km walk.

== Political career ==
Pribilinec was elected into the House of the People within the Federal Assembly in first free elections of June 1990 as a member of Communist Party of Slovakia (KSS) within the Communist Party of Czechoslovakia (KSČ). He was elected as a deputy for :sk:Stredoslovenský kraj. He resigned shortly after the election. In 1994, Pribilinec was elected as an MP into National Council running as a candidate on a party list of Common Choice coalition. He was nominated by the reformed post-communist SDĽ party, of which he was not a member, however. Ahead of the next elections, in the summer of 2002, Pribilinec fell out with party leader Pavel Koncoš, departed from the party caucus and did not stand for re-election. Concerning his Communist Party membership, Pribilinec said that he entered the party, aged 22, out of conviction, believing in declared values.

In 2022, Pribilinec ran unsuccessfully for a post of a regional deputy of Banská Bystrica Region as a candidate of minor extra-parliamentary national party Heart within the Žiar nad Hronom District precinct, with sport, tourism and service sector development, as his main agenda. Of 21 candidates, with 4 elected deputies, Pribilinec came 16th with 954 votes (2%). In the build-up to the elections, he advocated in support of Slovalco aluminium plant in Žiar nad Hronom, in a campaign seeking financial support for rising energy costs.

Records
Preceded by Domingo Colin	Men's 20 km Walk World Record Holder; 24 September 1983 – 3 May 1987	Succeeded by Carlos Mercenario
