= Ronald Weigel =

German athlete (born 1959)

Medal record

Men's athletics

Olympic Games

Representing East Germany
| Silver medal – second place | 1988 Seoul | 20 km walk |
| Silver medal – second place | 1988 Seoul | 50 km walk |

Representing Germany
| Bronze medal – third place | 1992 Barcelona | 50 km walk |

World Championships

Representing East Germany
| Gold medal – first place | 1983 Helsinki | 50 km walk |
| Silver medal – second place | 1987 Rome | 50 km walk |

Ronald Weigel (born 8 August 1959 in Hildburghausen, Thuringia) is a German athlete and Olympic medal winner. In the 1980s through the middle of the 1990s he represented East Germany (and then Germany after 1990) as one of world's best in race walking.

His first big win came in 1983 when he won the World title in the 50 km walk. At the 1988 Summer Olympic games he won a silver medal in the 20 km walk as well as a silver medal in the 50 km walk. At the 1992 Olympic Games he won a bronze medal in the 50km walk. He is the only German sportsman to have won Olympic medals in both walking disciplines at the Games.

He was unable to participate in the 1984 Summer Olympic Games because of the East German boycott, when he was the overwhelming favourite to win.

Weigel represented ASK Vorwärts Potsdam, and after reunification he went to OSC Potsdam and then LAC Halensee. He trained with Hans-Joachim Pathus. During his competitive years he was 1.77 meters tall and weighed 62 kilograms.

== Results in detail ==
- 1983, World championship, 50 km walk: 1st place (3:43:08 hours)
- 1987, World championship, 50 km walk: 2nd place (3:41:30 hours)
- 1988, Summer Olympic games, 20 km walk: 2nd place (1:20:00 hours); 50 km walk: 2nd place (3:38:56 hours)
- 1990, European championship, 50 km walk: 9th place (4:04:36 hours)

At the 1986 European championships he was disqualified in the 50 km walk. At the 1991 World championship he retired from the course, and at the 1995 World championship he was disqualified.

== Life outside sport ==
Weigel started in the sport as a student in his hometown of Hildburghausen and was found to have natural talent. In 1973 he became the East German student champion, and in 1977 he was second at the Junior European championship.

As a member of the Army sports club he was Hauptmann in the NVA. After reunification he freely admitted to having worked for the Stasi and was then let go from the sports group of the Bundeswehr without notice.

In 1997, Weigel took a position as the Australian national coach in Canberra. He trained the Australian Nathan Deakes who won the bronze medal in the 20 km walk at the 2004 Summer Olympic Games and was the 2007 World Champion over 50 km walk

After the games, Weigel went back to Germany and took over from his previous trainer, Hans-Joachim Pathus as the German national trainer. His admitted work for the East German security service was taken into consideration, but was not deemed to be a hindrance in hiring him.

Records
| Preceded by (Spain) Josep Marín | Men's 50km Walk World Record Holder; 20 July 1984 – 5 August 1989 | Succeeded by (Soviet Union) Andrey Perlov |
