= Mikhail Shchennikov =

Russian race walker (born 1967)

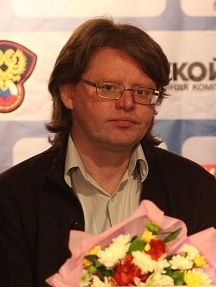
- Shchennikov in 2009

Personal information
- Native name: Михаил Анатольевич Щенников
- Full name: Mikhail Anatolyevich Schchennikov
- Nationality: Russian
- Born: 24 December 1967 (age 58) Sverdlovsk, Russian SFSR, Soviet Union
- Height: 1.82 m (6 ft 0 in)
- Weight: 70 kg (154 lb)

Sport
- Sport: Men's athletics
- Event: Race walking
Medal record
Representing the Soviet Union and Russia
Olympic Games
Silver medal – second place	1996 Atlanta	50 km
World Championships
Silver medal – second place	1991 Tokyo	20 km
Silver medal – second place	1997 Athens	20 km
World Indoor Championships
Gold medal – first place	1987 Indianapolis	5 km
Gold medal – first place	1989 Budapest	5 km
Gold medal – first place	1991 Seville	5 km
Gold medal – first place	1993 Toronto	5 km
European Championships
Gold medal – first place	1994 Helsinki	20 km
European Indoor Championships
Gold medal – first place	1989 The Hague	5 km
Gold medal – first place	1990 Glasgow	5 km
Gold medal – first place	1994 Paris	5 km
World Race Walking Cup
Gold medal – first place	1991 San José	20 km
Silver medal – second place	1989 L'Hospitalet	20 km
Silver medal – second place	1995 Beijing	20 km

Mikhail Anatolyevich Shchennikov (Russian: Михаил Анатольевич Щенников; born 24 December 1967, in Sverdlovsk) is a Russian race walker.

He was born in Sverdlovsk. His son Georgi Shchennikov is a professional footballer for PFC CSKA Moscow.

== Achievements ==
Year	Competition	Venue	Position	Event	Notes
Representing the Soviet Union
1986	World Junior Championships	Athens, Greece	1st	10,000m	40:38.01
1987	World Indoor Championships	Indianapolis, United States	1st	5000 m	18:27.79 = CR
1988	Olympic Games	Seoul, South Korea	6th	20 km	1:20:47
1989	World Indoor Championships	Budapest, Hungary	1st	5000 m	18:27.10 = CR
1989	European Indoor Championships	The Hague, Netherlands	1st	5000 m	18:35.60 = CR
1989	World Race Walking Cup	L'Hospitalet, Spain	2nd	20 km	1:20:34
1990	European Indoor Championships	Glasgow, United Kingdom	1st	5000 m	19:00.62
1990	European Championships	Split, Yugoslavia	—	20 km	DNF
1990	Goodwill Games	Seattle, United States	2nd	20,000 m	1:23:22.34
1991	World Indoor Championships	Seville, Spain	1st	5000 m	18:23.55 = CR
1991	World Championships	Tokyo, Japan	2nd	20 km	1:19:46
1991	World Race Walking Cup	San Jose, United States	1st	20 km	1:20:43
Representing Unified Team
1992	Olympic Games	Barcelona, Spain	12th	20 km	1:27:17
Representing Russia
1993	World Indoor Championships	Toronto, Canada	1st	5000 m	18:32.10
1993	World Race Walking Cup	Monterrey, Mexico	5th	20 km	1:24:49
1993	World Championships	Stuttgart, Germany	—	20 km	DQ
1994	European Indoor Championships	Paris, France	1st	5000 m	18:34.32
1994	European Championships	Helsinki, Finland	1st	20 km	1:18:45
1995	World Race Walking Cup	Beijing, China	2nd	20 km	1:19:58
1995	World Championships	Gothenburg, Sweden	6th	20 km	1:22:16
1996	Olympic Games	Atlanta, United States	7th	20 km	1:21:09
1996	Olympic Games	Atlanta, United States	2nd	50 km	3:43:46 = PB
1997	World Championships	Athens, Greece	2nd	20 km	1:21:53
1998	European Championships	Budapest, Hungary	—	20 km	DNF

Records
Preceded by Axel Noack	Men's 20 km walk world record holder July 30, 1988 – May 26, 1990	Succeeded by Andrey Perlov
