= 2002 in race walking =

This page lists the World Best Year Performance in the year 2002 in both the men's and the women's race walking distances: 20 km and 50 km (outdoor). One of the main events during this season were the 2002 European Athletics Championships in Munich, Germany. The world record was broken in 2002 in both the men's 20 km and 50 km race walk.

== Abbreviations ==
- All times shown are in hours:minutes:seconds

WR	world record
AR	area record
CR	event record
NR	national record
PB	personal best

== Men's 20 km ==
=== Records ===
Standing records prior to the 2002 season in track and field
World Record	Julio René Martínez (GUA)	1:17:46	May 8, 1999	Eisenhüttenstadt, Germany
World Record	Roman Rasskazov (RUS)	1:17:46	May 19, 2000	Moscow, Russia
Broken records during the 2002 season in track and field
World Record	Paquillo Fernández (ESP)	1:17:22	April 28, 2002	Turku, Finland

=== 2002 World Year Ranking ===
Rank	Time	Athlete	Venue	Date	Note
1	1:17:22	Paquillo Fernández (ESP)	Turku, Finland	28/04/2002	WR
2	1:19:02	Andrey Stadnichuk (RUS)	Adler, Russia	17/02/2002	
3	1:19:08	Jefferson Pérez (ECU)	Eisenhüttenstadt, Germany	02/06/2002	
4	1:19:18	Vladimir Andreyev (RUS)	Adler, Russia	17/02/2002	
5	1:19:25	Aigars Fadejevs (LAT)	Hildesheim, Germany	24/08/2002	
6	1:19:40	Robert Korzeniowski (POL)	Turku, Finland	28/04/2002	
7	1:19:49	Marco Giungi (ITA)	Grosseto, Italy	07/04/2002	
8	1:20:18	Juan Manuel Molina (ESP)	Naumburg, Germany	05/05/2002	
9	1:20:25	Robert Heffernan (IRL)	Naumburg, Germany	05/05/2002	
10	1:20:36	Viktor Burayev (RUS)	Munich, Germany	06/08/2002	
11	1:20:37	Semen Lovkin (RUS)	Adler, Russia	17/02/2002	
12	1:20:43	Yuki Yamazaki (JPN)	Kobe, Japan	27/01/2002	
13	1:20:44	João Vieira (POR)	Naumburg, Germany	05/05/2002	
14	1:20:52	Ivan Trotski (BLR)	Munich, Germany	06/08/2002	
15	1:20:56	Yevgeniy Misyulya (BLR)	Munich, Germany	06/08/2002	
16	1:20:57	Satoshi Yanagisawa (JPN)	Kobe, Japan	27/01/2002	
17	1:21:01	Roman Rasskazov (RUS)	Cheboksary, Russia	25/05/2002	
18	1:21:03	Alessandro Gandellini (ITA)	Munich, Germany	06/08/2002	
19	1:21:07	Nathan Deakes (AUS)	Zapopan, Mexico	22/03/2002	
20	1:21:12	Lorenzo Civallero (ITA)	Munich, Germany	06/08/2002	
21	1:21:23	Sergey Khripunov (RUS)	Adler, Russia	17/02/2002	
22	1:21:27	Andrey Makarov (BLR)	Brest, Belarus	06/06/2002	
23	1:21:36	Alejandro López (MEX)	Xalapa, Mexico	24/08/2002	
24	1:21:38	André Höhne (GER)	Munich, Germany	06/08/2002	
25	1:21:41	Mario Iván Flores (MEX)	Eisenhüttenstadt, Germany	02/06/2002	

== Men's 50 km ==
=== Records ===
Standing records prior to the 2002 season in track and field
World Record	Valeriy Spitsyn (RUS)	3:37:26	May 21, 2000	Moscow, Russia
Broken records during the 2002 season in track and field
World Record	Robert Korzeniowski (POL)	3:36:39	August 8, 2002	Munich, Germany

=== 2002 World Year Ranking ===
Rank	Time	Athlete	Venue	Date	Note
1	3:36:39	Robert Korzeniowski (POL)	Munich, Germany	08/08/2002	WR
2	3:40:16	Aleksey Voyevodin (RUS)	Munich, Germany	08/08/2002	
3	3:42:06	Yuriy Andronov (RUS)	Cheboksary, Russia	26/05/2002	
4	3:42:08	German Skurygin (RUS)	Turin, Italy	13/10/2002	
5	3:42:52	Stepan Yudin (RUS)	Cheboksary, Russia	26/05/2002	
6	3:43:46	Nikolay Matyukhin (RUS)	Cheboksary, Russia	26/05/2002	
7	3:44:33	Jesús Angel García (ESP)	Munich, Germany	08/08/2002	
8	3:45:28	Andreas Erm (GER)	Naumburg, Germany	05/05/2002	
9	3:45:37	Tomasz Lipiec (POL)	Turin, Italy	13/10/2002	
10	3:45:55	Marco Giungi (ITA)	Vittorio Veneto, Italy	03/03/2002	
11	3:47:55	Mikel Odriozola (ESP)	La Coruña, Spain	16/03/2002	
12	3:48:06	Giovanni De Benedictis (ITA)	Vittorio Veneto, Italy	03/03/2002	
13	3:48:17	Francesco Galdenzi (ITA)	Vittorio Veneto, Italy	03/03/2002	
14	3:49:27	Trond Nymark (NOR)	Borås, Norway	06/04/2002	
15	3:50:37	Grzegorz Sudol (POL)	Podebrady, Czech Republic	25/05/2002	
16	3:50:47	Denis Langlois (FRA)	Munich, Germany	08/08/2002	
17	3:51:15	Roman Magdziarczyk (POL)	Podebrady, Czech Republic	25/05/2002	
18	3:51:46	Jacob Sørensen (DEN)	Dublin, Ireland	15/06/2002	
19	3:51:47	Aleksandar Raković (SCG)	Munich, Germany	08/08/2002	
20	3:52:19	Sergey Kirdyapkin (RUS)	Cheboksary, Russia	26/05/2002	
21	3:52:20	Sergey Korepanov (KAZ)	Turin, Italy	13/10/2002	
22	3:52:36	Modris Liepiņš (LAT)	Munich, Germany	08/08/2002	
23	3:52:36	Peter Tichy (SVK)	Turin, Italy	13/10/2002	
24	3:52:37	Aleksandr Nadezhdin (RUS)	Cheboksary, Russia	26/05/2002	
25	3:52:40	Alessandro Mistretta (ITA)	Vittorio Veneto, Italy	03/03/2002	
25	3:52:40	Nathan Deakes (AUS)	Manchester, Great Britain	30/07/2002	

== Women's 20 km ==
=== Records ===
Standing records prior to the 2002 season in track and field
World Record	Olimpiada Ivanova (RUS)	1:24:50	March 4, 2001	Adler, Russia

=== 2002 World Year Ranking ===
Rank	Time	Athlete	Venue	Date	Note
1	1:26:42	Olimpiada Ivanova (RUS)	Munich, Germany	07/08/2002	
2	1:27:02	Yelena Nikolayeva (RUS)	Cheboksary, Russia	25/05/2002	
3	1:27:45	Natalya Fedoskina (RUS)	Adler, Russia	17/02/2002	
4	1:27:51	Lyudmila Yefimkina (RUS)	Cheboksary, Russia	25/05/2002	
5	1:28:03	Larisa Emelyanova (RUS)	Adler, Russia	17/02/2002	
6	1:28:18	Nadezhda Ryashkina (RUS)	Cheboksary, Russia	25/05/2002	
7	1:28:24	Margarita Nazarova (RUS)	Cheboksary, Russia	25/05/2002	PB
8	1:28:33	Erica Alfridi (ITA)	Munich, Germany	07/08/2002	
9	1:28:38	Svetlana Tolstaya (KAZ)	Cheboksary, Russia	25/05/2002	
10	1:28:46	Gillian O'Sullivan (IRL)	Munich, Germany	07/08/2002	
11	1:28:47	María Vasco (ESP)	La Coruña, Spain	16/03/2002	
12	1:28:55	Kjersti Plätzer (NOR)	Dublin, Ireland	15/06/2002	
13	1:29:12	Tatyana Korotkova (RUS)	Cheboksary, Russia	25/05/2002	
14	1:29:47	Antonina Petrova (RUS)	Adler, Russia	17/02/2002	
15	1:29:57	Claudia Stef (ROM)	Munich, Germany	07/08/2002	
16	1:30:21	Tatyana Gudkova (RUS)	Izhevsk, Russia	22/09/2002	
17	1:30:25	Elisabetta Perrone (ITA)	Munich, Germany	07/08/2002	
18	1:30:37	Valentina Tsybulskaya (BLR)	Turin, Italy	12/10/2002	
19	1:30:38	Olga Lukyanchuk (UKR)	Yevpatoria, Ukraine	24/02/2002	
20	1:30:43	Elisa Rigaudo (ITA)	Dublin, Ireland	15/06/2002	
21	1:30:44	Kristina Saltanovič (LTU)	Munich, Germany	07/08/2002	
22	1:30:50	Norica Câmpean (ROM)	Resita, Romania	14/07/2002	
23	1:30:57	Elena Ginko (BLR)	Brest, Belarus	04/06/2002	
24	1:31:08	Melanie Seeger (GER)	Eisenhüttenstadt, Germany	02/06/2002	
25	1:31:10	Rossella Giordano (ITA)	Turin, Italy	12/10/2002	
