= 2002 IAAF World Race Walking Cup =

- Organisers: IAAF
- Edition: 20th
- Date: October 12–13
- Host city: Turin, Piemonte, Italy
- Events: 3
- Participation: 298 athletes from 51 nations

The 2002 IAAF World Race Walking Cup was held on 12 and 13 October 2002 in the streets of Turin, Italy. Detailed reports on the event and an appraisal of the results was given for the IAAF.

Complete results were published.

== Medallists ==
Event	Gold		Silver		Bronze	
Men
Men's 20 km walk	Jefferson Pérez; Ecuador	1:21:26	Vladimir Andreyev; Russia	1:21:50	Alejandro López; Mexico	1:22:01
Men's 50 km walk	Aleksey Voyevodin; Russia	3:40:59	German Skurygin; Russia	3:42:08	Tomasz Lipiec; Poland	3:45:37
Team (Men)
Team (Men 20 km)	Russia	24 pts	Belarus	28 pts	Italy	34 pts
Team (Men 50 km)	Russia	7 pts	France	59 pts	China	78 pts
Women
Women's 20 km walk	Erica Alfridi; Italy	1:28:55	Olimpiada Ivanova; Russia	1:28:57	Natalya Fedoskina; Russia	1:28:59
Team (Women)
Team (Women 20 km)	Russia	9 pts	Italy	26 pts	Romania	42 pts

== Results ==
=== Men's 20 km ===
Place	Athlete	Nation	Time	Notes
1st place, gold medalist(s)	Jefferson Pérez	Ecuador (ECU)	1:21:26	
2nd place, silver medalist(s)	Vladimir Andreyev	Russia (RUS)	1:21:50	
3rd place, bronze medalist(s)	Alejandro López	Mexico (MEX)	1:22:01	
4	Noé Hernández	Mexico (MEX)	1:22:52	
5	Yevgeniy Misyulya	Belarus (BLR)	1:23:07	
6	Andrey Stadnichuk	Russia (RUS)	1:23:07	
7	Alessandro Gandellini	Italy (ITA)	1:23:18	
8	Juan Manuel Molina	Spain (ESP)	1:23:46	
9	Hatem Ghoula	Tunisia (TUN)	1:23:49	SB
10	Artur Meleshkevich	Belarus (BLR)	1:23:57	
11	João Vieira	Portugal (POR)	1:24:13	
12	Lorenzo Civallero	Italy (ITA)	1:24:22	
13	Ivan Trotski	Belarus (BLR)	1:24:29	
14	Jiří Malysa	Czech Republic (CZE)	1:25:34	
15	Marco Giungi	Italy (ITA)	1:25:42	
16	Semyon Lovkin	Russia (RUS)	1:26:22	
17	Enrico Lang	Italy (ITA)	1:26:25	
18	Cristian Muñoz	Chile (CHI)	1:26:29	
19	Wang Shigang	China (CHN)	1:26:30	
20	Jiří Mašita	Czech Republic (CZE)	1:26:43	
21	Zhang Hong	China (CHN)	1:26:53	
22	Augusto Cardoso	Portugal (POR)	1:27:07	
23	Wang Yu	China (CHN)	1:27:12	
24	André Höhne	Germany (GER)	1:27:17	
25	Fredy Hernández	Colombia (COL)	1:27:23	
26	Fausto Quinde	Ecuador (ECU)	1:27:33	
27	Miloš Bátovský	Slovakia (SVK)	1:27:38	
28	Alfio Corsaro	Italy (ITA)	1:27:49	
29	Peter Barto	Slovakia (SVK)	1:27:59	
30	José David Domínguez	Spain (ESP)	1:28:04	
31	Kevin Eastler	United States (USA)	1:28:18	
32	Frank Werner	Germany (GER)	1:28:50	
33	Kamil Kalka	Poland (POL)	1:29:05	
34	Andrés Chocho	Ecuador (ECU)	1:29:09	
35	Peter Korčok	Slovakia (SVK)	1:29:12	
36	Trond Nymark	Norway (NOR)	1:29:16	
37	János Tóth	Hungary (HUN)	1:29:18	
38	Eiichi Yoshizawa	Japan (JPN)	1:29:23	
39	Colin Griffin	Ireland (IRL)	1:29:37	
40	Xavier Moreno	Ecuador (ECU)	1:29:54	
41	Zhang Tianping	China (CHN)	1:29:56	
42	Benjamin Kuciński	Poland (POL)	1:29:58	
43	Sergio Galdino	Brazil (BRA)	1:30:05	
44	José Antonio González	Spain (ESP)	1:30:31	
45	Kazimir Verkin	Slovakia (SVK)	1:30:57	
46	Steve Partington	Great Britain (GBR)	1:31:41	
47	Julio Urías	Guatemala (GUA)	1:31:42	
48	Jani Lehtinen	Finland (FIN)	1:31:42	
49	António Pereira	Portugal (POR)	1:31:57	
50	Chang Chunhu	China (CHN)	1:32:02	
51	Sean Albert	United States (USA)	1:32:08	
52	Nenad Filipović	Yugoslavia (YUG)	1:32:10	
53	Erik Tysse	Norway (NOR)	1:32:12	
54	Predrag Filipović	Yugoslavia (YUG)	1:32:41	
55	Sébastien Biche	France (FRA)	1:32:52	
56	Sylvain Caudron	France (FRA)	1:33:08	
57	Rustam Kuvatov	Kazakhstan (KAZ)	1:33:24	
58	Radovan Elko	Slovakia (SVK)	1:33:59	
59	Sándor Urbanik	Hungary (HUN)	1:34:41	
60	Arturo Huerta	Canada (CAN)	1:34:57	
61	Péter Domján	Hungary (HUN)	1:34:57	
62	Jamie Costin	Ireland (IRL)	1:35:15	
63	Steven Hollier	Great Britain (GBR)	1:35:18	
64	Franck Delree	France (FRA)	1:35:25	
65	Radek Pařízek	Czech Republic (CZE)	1:36:04	
66	Andi Drake	Great Britain (GBR)	1:36:06	
67	Theron Kissinger	United States (USA)	1:37:03	
68	Dom King	Great Britain (GBR)	1:37:40	
69	Aleksandr Kuzmin	Belarus (BLR)	1:38:09	
70	Sigbjørn Sandberg	Norway (NOR)	1:38:28	
71	André Katzinski	Germany (GER)	1:38:29	
72	Rafał Dys	Poland (POL)	1:38:50	
73	Mikaël Thomas	France (FRA)	1:38:53	
74	Matthew Boyles	United States (USA)	1:39:02	
75	Nicolas Perrier	Switzerland (SUI)	1:40:16	
76	Gordon Mosher	Canada (CAN)	1:43:35	
77	Mohammad Reza Banaei	Iran (IRI)	1:43:59	
78	Hamid Reza Aghchem	Iran (IRI)	1:44:02	
79	José Ramírez	Puerto Rico (PUR)	1:45:01	
80	Mohammad Reza Moheby Goshnekan	Iran (IRI)	1:45:48	
81	Bruno Grandjean	Switzerland (SUI)	1:46:40	
82	Jairol Chacon Briceño	Costa Rica (CRC)	1:48:04	
83	Yann Banderet	Switzerland (SUI)	1:48:16	
84	Olivier Bianchi-Pastori	Switzerland (SUI)	1:48:33	
85	Ahmed-Tijani Sanni	Ghana (GHA)	1:55:03	
86	Stanley Braimah	Ghana (GHA)	2:03:08	
87	Muda Musah	Ghana (GHA)	2:06:12	
—	Jean-Sebastien Beaucage	Canada (CAN)	DQ	
—	José Alejandro Cambil	Spain (ESP)	DQ	
—	Margus Luik	Estonia (EST)	DQ	
—	Pradeep Chand	Fiji (FIJ)	DQ	
—	Vincent Asumang	Ghana (GHA)	DQ	
—	Cristian Berdeja	Mexico (MEX)	DQ	
—	Omar Segura	Mexico (MEX)	DQ	
—	Claudio Vargas	Mexico (MEX)	DQ	
—	Harold van Beek	Netherlands (NED)	DQ	
—	Roman Rasskazov	Russia (RUS)	DQ	
—	Sergey Bantikov	Tajikistan (TJK)	DQ	
—	Blair Miller	Canada (CAN)	DNF	
—	Pavel Svoboda	Czech Republic (CZE)	DNF	
—	Hans Christensen	Denmark (DEN)	DNF	
—	Manohar Maharaj	Fiji (FIJ)	DNF	
—	Selwyn Shaniel Singh	Fiji (FIJ)	DNF	
—	Jan Albrecht	Germany (GER)	DNF	
—	Surokaneni Iddrissu	Ghana (GHA)	DNF	
—	Linas Bubnelis	Lithuania (LTU)	DNF	
—	Grzegorz Sudoł	Poland (POL)	DNF	
—	Viktor Burayev	Russia (RUS)	DNF	
—	John Nunn	United States (USA)	DNF	
—	Aleksandar Raković	Yugoslavia (YUG)	DNF	

==== Team (20 km Men) ====
Place	Country	Points
1st place, gold medalist(s)	Russia	24 pts
2nd place, silver medalist(s)	Belarus	28 pts
3rd place, bronze medalist(s)	Italy	34 pts
4	Ecuador	61 pts
5	China	63 pts
6	Spain	82 pts
7	Portugal	82 pts
8	Slovakia	91 pts
9	Czech Republic	99 pts
10	Germany	127 pts
11	Poland	147 pts
12	United States	149 pts
13	Hungary	157 pts
14	Norway	159 pts
15	United Kingdom	175 pts
16	France	175 pts
17	Iran	235 pts
18	Switzerland	239 pts
19	Ghana	258 pts

=== Men's 50 km ===
Place	Athlete	Nation	Time	Notes
1st place, gold medalist(s)	Aleksey Voyevodin	Russia (RUS)	3:40:59	
2nd place, silver medalist(s)	German Skurygin	Russia (RUS)	3:42:08	SB
3rd place, bronze medalist(s)	Tomasz Lipiec	Poland (POL)	3:45:37	SB
4	Nikolay Matyukhin	Russia (RUS)	3:47:06	
5	Stepan Yudin	Russia (RUS)	3:51:03	
6	Denis Langlois	France (FRA)	3:51:32	
7	Sergey Korepanov	Kazakhstan (KAZ)	3:52:20	
8	Peter Tichý	Slovakia (SVK)	3:52:36	SB
9	Francisco Pinardo	Spain (ESP)	3:52:51	PB
10	Modris Liepiņš	Latvia (LAT)	3:53:49	
11	Miguel Rodríguez	Mexico (MEX)	3:54:26	SB
12	Roman Magdziarczyk	Poland (POL)	3:55:26	
13	Philip Dunn	United States (USA)	3:56:13	PB
14	Miloš Holuša	Czech Republic (CZE)	3:56:30	
15	Liam Murphy	Australia (AUS)	3:56:45	
16	Wang Yinhang	China (CHN)	3:57:00	
17	Vladimir Potemin	Russia (RUS)	3:57:18	
18	Viktor Ginko	Belarus (BLR)	3:57:31	
19	Luis Fernando García	Guatemala (GUA)	3:58:44	PB
20	Fredrik Svensson	Sweden (SWE)	3:59:16	
21	Alessandro Mistretta	Italy (ITA)	4:00:12	
22	Eddy Riva	France (FRA)	4:00:58	
23	Bengt Bengtsson	Sweden (SWE)	4:01:00	
24	Yoshimi Hara	Japan (JPN)	4:01:49	
25	Diego Cafagna	Italy (ITA)	4:02:30	
26	Ma Hongye	China (CHN)	4:03:37	
27	Daugvinas Zujus	Lithuania (LTU)	4:04:54	
28	Yeóryios Aryirópoulos	Greece (GRE)	4:05:25	
29	Luke Adams	Australia (AUS)	4:07:08	
30	Juan Antonio Porras	Spain (ESP)	4:07:29	
31	Pascal Servanty	France (FRA)	4:07:46	
32	Pedro Martins	Portugal (POR)	4:08:13	
33	Fumio Imamura	Japan (JPN)	4:09:06	
34	Zoltán Czukor	Hungary (HUN)	4:09:15	
36	Mao Xinli	China (CHN)	4:11:47	
37	Duane Cousins	Australia (AUS)	4:12:19	
38	Darren Bown	Australia (AUS)	4:12:21	
39	Patrick Ennemoser	Italy (ITA)	4:12:35	
40	Hugo López	Guatemala (GUA)	4:14:28	
41	Luís Gil	Portugal (POR)	4:16:19	
42	Marek Janek	Slovakia (SVK)	4:16:55	
43	Attila Fülöp	Hungary (HUN)	4:17:57	
44	Ken Akashi	Japan (JPN)	4:17:59	
45	Gonçalo Fonseca	Portugal (POR)	4:18:22	
46	Maik Berger	Germany (GER)	4:19:53	
47	Frank Bertei	Australia (AUS)	4:20:26	
48	José Magalhães	Portugal (POR)	4:21:33	
49	Denis Franke	Germany (GER)	4:21:53	
50	Birger Fält	Sweden (SWE)	4:22:04	
51	Mike Trautmann	Germany (GER)	4:23:44	
52	Aleksandras Danulevicius	Lithuania (LTU)	4:24:47	
53	Andrey Stepanchuk	Belarus (BLR)	4:26:20	
54	Alexandr Andrushevskiy	Belarus (BLR)	4:26:40	
55	Fabio Ruzzier	Slovenia (SLO)	4:33:25	
56	Yuris Konisevs	Latvia (LAT)	4:34:57	
57	Anatolijus Launikonis	Lithuania (LTU)	4:36:10	
58	Róbert Tubak	Hungary (HUN)	4:44:41	
59	John Souchek	United States (USA)	4:48:02	
—	Anton Trotskiy	Belarus (BLR)	DQ	
—	Mario Avellaneda	Spain (ESP)	DQ	
—	Jesús Ángel García	Spain (ESP)	DQ	
—	Lauri Lelumees	Estonia (EST)	DQ	
—	Anthony Adjet	Ghana (GHA)	DQ	
—	Jeandy Kwofie	Ghana (GHA)	DQ	
—	Jeff Cassin	Ireland (IRL)	DQ	
—	Sergeys Lapsa	Latvia (LAT)	DQ	
—	Germán Sánchez	Mexico (MEX)	DQ	
—	Rogelio Sánchez	Mexico (MEX)	DQ	
—	Marcel van Gemert	Netherlands (NED)	DQ	
—	Ferdinand Espejo	Philippines (PHI)	DQ	
—	Joel Barcuma	Philippines (PHI)	DQ	
—	Michael Embuedo	Philippines (PHI)	DQ	
—	Saturnino Salazar	Philippines (PHI)	DQ	
—	Rodrigo Turno	Philippines (PHI)	DQ	
—	Steve Quirke	United States (USA)	DQ	
—	Bai Liansheng	China (CHN)	DNF	
—	Han Qiang	China (CHN)	DNF	
—	David Boulanger	France (FRA)	DNF	
—	René Piller	France (FRA)	DNF	
—	Denis Trautmann	Germany (GER)	DNF	
—	Ahmed Ali	Ghana (GHA)	DNF	
—	Spyridon Kastánis	Greece (GRE)	DNF	
—	Theódoros Stamatópoulos	Greece (GRE)	DNF	
—	Ivano Brugnetti	Italy (ITA)	DNF	
—	Francesco Galdenzi	Italy (ITA)	DNF	
—	Aigars Fadejevs	Latvia (LAT)	DNF	
—	Edgar Hernández	Mexico (MEX)	DNF	
—	Omar Zepeda	Mexico (MEX)	DNF	
—	Martin Pupiš	Slovakia (SVK)	DNF	
—	Curt Clausen	United States (USA)	DNF	
—	Tim Seaman	United States (USA)	DNF	

==== Team (50 km Men) ====
Place	Country	Points
1st place, gold medalist(s)	Russia	7 pts
2nd place, silver medalist(s)	France	59 pts
3rd place, bronze medalist(s)	China	78 pts
4	Australia	81 pts
5	Italy	85 pts
6	Sweden	93 pts
7	Latvia	101 pts
8	Japan	101 pts
9	Portugal	118 pts
10	Belarus	125 pts
11	Hungary	135 pts
12	Lithuania	136 pts
13	Germany	146 pts

=== Women's 20 km ===
Place	Athlete	Nation	Time	Notes
1st place, gold medalist(s)	Erica Alfridi	Italy (ITA)	1:28:55	
2nd place, silver medalist(s)	Olimpiada Ivanova	Russia (RUS)	1:28:57	
3rd place, bronze medalist(s)	Natalya Fedoskina	Russia (RUS)	1:28:59	
4	Yelena Nikolayeva	Russia (RUS)	1:29:12	
5	Kjersti Plätzer	Norway (NOR)	1:29:25	
6	Claudia Stef	Romania (ROM)	1:30:05	
7	Valentina Tsybulskaya	Belarus (BLR)	1:30:37	
8	María Vasco	Spain (ESP)	1:30:57	
9	Rossella Giordano	Italy (ITA)	1:31:10	
10	Norica Câmpean	Romania (ROM)	1:31:41	
11	Nadezhda Ryashkina	Russia (RUS)	1:32:27	
12	Rosario Sánchez	Mexico (MEX)	1:32:47	
13	Andrea Meloni	Germany (GER)	1:32:48	PB
14	Susana Feitór	Portugal (POR)	1:32:57	
15	Olga Kardopoltseva	Belarus (BLR)	1:33:19	SB
16	Elisa Rigaudo	Italy (ITA)	1:33:38	
17	Victoria Palacios	Mexico (MEX)	1:34:06	SB
18	Kristina Saltanovič	Lithuania (LTU)	1:34:26	
19	Beatriz Pascual	Spain (ESP)	1:34:28	
20	Gisella Orsini	Italy (ITA)	1:34:37	
21	Lyudmila Yefimkina	Russia (RUS)	1:34:58	
22	Larisa Khmelnitskaya	Belarus (BLR)	1:35:17	
23	Inês Henriques	Portugal (POR)	1:35:28	
24	Jane Saville	Australia (AUS)	1:35:35	
25	Melanie Seeger	Germany (GER)	1:35:37	
26	Daniela Cîrlan	Romania (ROU)	1:35:38	
27	Shi Na	China (CHN)	1:35:38	
28	María Guadalupe Sánchez	Mexico (MEX)	1:35:56	
29	Sun Chunfang	China (CHN)	1:36:01	
30	Xu Aihui	China (CHN)	1:36:25	
31	Geovana Irusta	Bolivia (BOL)	1:36:27	
32	Maya Sazonova	Kazakhstan (KAZ)	1:36:35	
33	Vira Zozulya	Ukraine (UKR)	1:36:42	
34	Ana Maria Groza	Romania (ROU)	1:36:43	
35	Sonata Milušauskaitė	Lithuania (LTU)	1:36:48	
36	Vera Santos	Portugal (POR)	1:37:18	
37	Teresa Linares	Spain (ESP)	1:37:33	
38	Eva Pérez	Spain (ESP)	1:37:52	
39	Graciela Mendoza	Mexico (MEX)	1:37:58	
40	Maribel Gonçalves	Portugal (POR)	1:38:11	
41	Fatiha Ouali	France (FRA)	1:38:53	
42	Sylwia Korzeniowska	Poland (POL)	1:39:18	
43	Sofia Avoila	Portugal (POR)	1:39:26	
44	Teresita Collado	Guatemala (GUA)	1:39:27	
45	Yelena Miroshnychenko	Ukraine (UKR)	1:39:46	
46	Rocío Florido	Spain (ESP)	1:39:48	
47	Zuzana Malíková	Slovakia (SVK)	1:39:50	
48	Edina Füsti	Hungary (HUN)	1:40:02	
49	Monica Svensson	Sweden (SWE)	1:40:50	
50	Joanne Dow	United States (USA)	1:41:00	
51	Nagwa Ibrahim	Egypt (EGY)	1:41:08	
52	Yelena Kuznetsova	Kazakhstan (KAZ)	1:41:32	
53	Barbora Dibelková	Czech Republic (CZE)	1:41:44	
54	Susan Armenta	United States (USA)	1:42:14	
55	Gabrielle Gorst	New Zealand (NZL)	1:43:00	
56	Nina Moskvina	Ukraine (UKR)	1:43:05	
57	Mária Rosza-Urbanik	Hungary (HUN)	1:43:32	
58	Anna Szumny	Poland (POL)	1:43:45	
59	Outi Sillanpää	Finland (FIN)	1:43:52	
60	Abigail Sáenz	Mexico (MEX)	1:44:37	
61	Marie Polli	Switzerland (SUI)	1:44:41	
62	Melissa Rodriguez	France (FRA)	1:44:44	
63	Li Hong	China (CHN)	1:45:05	
64	Johanna Rostad	Norway (NOR)	1:45:16	
65	Christine Guinaudeau	France (FRA)	1:45:20	
66	Holly Gerke	Canada (CAN)	1:45:44	
67	Elin Cecilie Loftesnes	Norway (NOR)	1:46:02	
68	Agnieszka Olesz	Poland (POL)	1:46:53	
69	Jill Zenner-Cobb	United States (USA)	1:47:35	
70	Morelba Useche	Venezuela (VEN)	1:47:55	
71	Sharon Tonks	Great Britain (GBR)	1:48:33	
72	Ildikó Ilyés	Hungary (HUN)	1:49:09	
73	Corinna Hensel	Germany (GER)	1:50:20	
74	Stephanie Panzig	Germany (GER)	1:52:04	
75	Sarah-Jane Cattermole	Great Britain (GBR)	1:52:44	
76	Marina Crivello	Canada (CAN)	1:53:05	
77	Laura Polli	Switzerland (SUI)	1:55:22	
78	Maia Liitmaa	Estonia (EST)	1:56:06	
79	Melinda Manahan	Philippines (PHI)	2:05:56	
—	Yelena Ginko	Belarus (BLR)	DQ	
—	Ariana Quino Salazar	Bolivia (BOL)	DQ	
—	Jiang Qiuyan	China (CHN)	DQ	
—	Kerly Lillemets	Estonia (EST)	DQ	
—	Lisa Kehler	Great Britain (GBR)	DQ	
—	Teresa Vaill	United States (USA)	DQ	
—	Gianetti Bonfim	Brazil (BRA)	DNF	
—	Kaity-Marin Tiitmaa	Estonia (EST)	DNF	
—	Tatiana Denize	France (FRA)	DNF	
—	Hristína Kokótou	Greece (GRE)	DNF	
—	Athiná Papagianni	Greece (GRE)	DNF	
—	Olive Loughnane	Ireland (IRL)	DNF	
—	Gillian OʼSullivan	Ireland (IRL)	DNF	
—	Elisabetta Perrone	Italy (ITA)	DNF	
—	Joanna Baj	Poland (POL)	DNF	
—	Amber Antonia	United States (USA)	DNF	

==== Team (20km Women) ====
Place	Country	Points
1st place, gold medalist(s)	Russia	9 pts
2nd place, silver medalist(s)	Italy; Erica Alfridi; Rossella Giordano; Elisa Rigaudo; Gisella Orsini; Elisabetta Perrone	26 pts
3rd place, bronze medalist(s)	Romania	42 pts
4	Belarus	44 pts
5	Mexico	57 pts
6	Spain	64 pts
7	Portugal	73 pts
8	China	86 pts
9	Germany	111 pts
10	Ukraine	134 pts
11	Norway	136 pts
12	France	168 pts
13	Poland	168 pts
14	United States	173 pts
15	Hungary	177 pts

== Participation ==
The participation of 298 athletes (203 men/95 women) from 51 countries is reported.

- Australia (5/1)
- Belarus (8/4)
- Bolivia (-/2)
- Brazil (1/1)
- Canada (4/2)
- Chile (1/-)
- China (10/5)
- Colombia (1/-)
- Costa Rica (1/-)
- Czech Republic (5/1)
- Denmark (1/-)
- Ecuador (4/-)
- Egypt (-/1)
- Estonia (2/3)
- Fiji (3/-)
- Finland (1/1)
- France (9/4)
- Germany (8/4)
- Ghana (8/-)
- Greece (3/2)
- Guatemala (3/1)
- Hungary (6/3)
- Iran (3/-)
- Ireland (3/2)
- Italy (9/5)
- Japan (4/-)
- Kazakhstan (2/2)
- Latvia (4/-)
- Lithuania (4/2)
- Mexico (10/4)
- Netherlands (2/-)
- New Zealand (-/1)
- Norway (3/3)
- Philippines (5/1)
- Poland (6/4)
- Portugal (7/5)
- Puerto Rico (1/-)
- Romania (-/4)
- Russia (10/5)
- Slovakia (8/1)
- Slovenia (1/-)
- Spain (8/5)
- Sweden (3/1)
- Switzerland (4/2)
- Tajikistan (1/-)
- Tunisia (1/-)
- Ukraine (-/3)
- United Kingdom (4/3)
- United States (10/5)
- Venezuela (-/1)
- (Federal Republic of Yugoslavia) Yugoslavia (3/-)

== See also ==
- 2002 Race Walking Year Ranking
