= 1997 IAAF World Race Walking Cup =

- Organisers: IAAF
- Edition: 18th
- Date: April 19–20
- Host city: Poděbrady, Central Bohemia, Czech Republic
- Venue: Lázeňský park
- Events: 3
- Participation: 365 athletes from 47 nations

The 1997 IAAF World Race Walking Cup was held on 19 and 20 April 1997 in the streets of Poděbrady, Czech Republic. The course followed a loop around Lázeňský park.

Detailed reports on the event and an appraisal of the results was given for the IAAF.

Complete results were published.

== Medallists ==
Event	Gold		Silver		Bronze	
Men
Men's 20 km walk	Jefferson Pérez; Ecuador	1:18:24	Daniel García; Mexico	1:18:27	Ilya Markov; Russia	1:18:30
Men's 50 km walk	Jesús Ángel García; Spain	3:39:54	Oleg Ishutkin; Russia	3:40:12	Valentin Kononen; Finland	3:41:09
Team (Men)
Lugano Trophy (team men overall)	Russia	865 pts	Mexico	803 pts	Belarus	802 pts
Team (Men 20 km)	Russia	431 pts	Belarus	413 pts	Mexico	403 pts
Team (Men 50 km)	Russia	434 pts	Slovakia	415 pts	Spain	407 pts
Women
Women's 10 km walk	Irina Stankina; Russia	41:52	Olimpiada Ivanova; Russia	41:59	Gu Yan; China	42:15
Team (women)
Eschborn Cup (Women 10 km)	Russia	440 pts	Italy	435 pts	China	425 pts

== Results ==
=== Men's 20 km ===
Place	Athlete	Nation	Time	Notes
1st place, gold medalist(s)	Jefferson Pérez	Ecuador (ECU)	1:18:24	
2nd place, silver medalist(s)	Daniel García	Mexico (MEX)	1:18:27	
3rd place, bronze medalist(s)	Ilya Markov	Russia (RUS)	1:18:30	
4	Li Zewen	China (CHN)	1:18:32	
5	Julio René Martínez	Guatemala (GUA)	1:18:51	
6	Yevgeniy Misyulya	Belarus (BLR)	1:18:55	
7	Rishat Shafikov	Russia (RUS)	1:19:27	
8	Artur Meleshkevich	Belarus (BLR)	1:19:33	
9	Mikhail Shchennikov	Russia (RUS)	1:19:45	
10	Vladimir Andreyev	Russia (RUS)	1:19:46	
11	Andrey Makarov	Russia (RUS)	1:19:54	
12	Nicholas A'Hern	Australia (AUS)	1:20:04	
13	Joel Sánchez	Mexico (MEX)	1:20:05	
14	Igor Kollár	Slovakia (SVK)	1:20:09	
15	Aigars Fadejevs	Latvia (LAT)	1:20:13	
16	Daisuke Ikeshima	Japan (JPN)	1:20:27	
17	Alessandro Gandellini	Italy (ITA)	1:20:31	
18	Denis Langlois	France (FRA)	1:20:35	
19	Valentí Massana	Spain (ESP)	1:20:39	
20	Sándor Urbanik	Hungary (HUN)	1:20:41	
21	Thierry Toutain	France (FRA)	1:20:43	
22	Giovanni De Benedictis	Italy (ITA)	1:20:49	
23	Walter Arena	Italy (ITA)	1:20:50	
24	Mikhail Khmelnitsky	Belarus (BLR)	1:20:51	
25	Sérgio Vieira	Portugal (POR)	1:20:58	
26	Róbert Valíček	Slovakia (SVK)	1:20:58	
27	João Vieira	Portugal (POR)	1:20:59	
28	Fernando Vázquez	Spain (ESP)	1:20:59	
29	Andreas Erm	Germany (GER)	1:21:05	
30	Valdas Kazlauskas	Lithuania (LTU)	1:21:29	
31	Mariusz Ornoch	Poland (POL)	1:21:33	
32	Robert Ihly	Germany (GER)	1:21:47	
33	Sergio Galdino	Brazil (BRA)	1:21:50	
34	Valeriy Borisov	Kazakhstan (KAZ)	1:21:51	
35	Omar Zepeda	Mexico (MEX)	1:21:59	
36	Vladimir Druchik	Ukraine (UKR)	1:22:03	
37	Jean-Olivier Brosseau	France (FRA)	1:22:04	
38	Modris Liepiņš	Latvia (LAT)	1:22:04	
39	Yu Guohui	China (CHN)	1:22:08	
40	Aleksandar Raković	Yugoslavia (YUG)	1:22:12	
41	Cláudio Bertolino	Brazil (BRA)	1:22:31	
42	Sergey Korepanov	Kazakhstan (KAZ)	1:22:32	
43	Roberto Oscal	Guatemala (GUA)	1:22:34	
44	José Urbano	Portugal (POR)	1:22:40	
45	Marco Giungi	Italy (ITA)	1:22:41	
46	Paquillo Fernández	Spain (ESP)	1:22:41	
47	Yuriy Kuko	Belarus (BLR)	1:23:05	
48	Hubert Sonnek	Czech Republic (CZE)	1:23:08	
49	Dion Russell	Australia (AUS)	1:23:40	
50	Jan Staaf	Sweden (SWE)	1:23:50	
51	Jiří Malysa	Czech Republic (CZE)	1:23:55	
52	Nathan Deakes	Australia (AUS)	1:23:58	
53	Roman Magdziarczyk	Poland (POL)	1:24:01	
54	Vitaliy Stetsyshyn	Ukraine (UKR)	1:24:13	
55	Juan Antonio Porras	Spain (ESP)	1:24:28	
56	Yuriy Gordeyev	Kazakhstan (KAZ)	1:24:34	
57	Chris Britz	South Africa (RSA)	1:24:35	
58	Gintaras Andriuškevičius	Lithuania (LTU)	1:24:37	
59	Curt Clausen	United States (USA)	1:24:41	
60	Eddy Riva	France (FRA)	1:24:47	
61	Narinder Harbans Singh	Malaysia (MAS)	1:24:50	
62	Gyula Dudás	Hungary (HUN)	1:24:56	
63	Michele Didoni	Italy (ITA)	1:24:59	
64	Pascal Servanty	France (FRA)	1:25:00	
65	Miroslav Bosko	Slovakia (SVK)	1:25:13	
66	Sigitas Vainauskas	Lithuania (LTU)	1:25:14	
67	Brent Vallance	Australia (AUS)	1:25:23	
68	Luis García	Guatemala (GUA)	1:25:42	
69	Ademar Kammler	Brazil (BRA)	1:25:46	
70	Grzegorz Sudoł	Poland (POL)	1:25:47	
71	Arvydas Vainauskas	Lithuania (LTU)	1:25:51	
72	Arturo Huerta	Canada (CAN)	1:25:55	
73	Augusto Cardoso	Portugal (POR)	1:25:57	
74	Andrew Hermann	United States (USA)	1:26:07	
75	Philip Dunn	United States (USA)	1:26:36	
76	Nikolay Kalitka	Ukraine (UKR)	1:26:40	
77	Ján Záhončík	Slovakia (SVK)	1:26:46	
78	Andrew Penn	Great Britain (GBR)	1:26:49	
79	Anatoliy Krot	Ukraine (UKR)	1:27:10	
80	Leonid Mizernyuk	Ukraine (UKR)	1:27:24	
81	Bengt Bengtsson	Sweden (SWE)	1:27:32	
82	Tomáš Kratochvíl	Czech Republic (CZE)	1:27:43	
83	Pedro Martins	Portugal (POR)	1:27:51	
84	Mark Easton	Great Britain (GBR)	1:28:02	
85	Stanley Valentine	South Africa (RSA)	1:28:03	
86	Kazimir Verkin	Slovakia (SVK)	1:28:12	
87	Trond Nymark	Norway (NOR)	1:28:15	
88	Aigars Saleniks	Latvia (LAT)	1:28:35	
89	Dimítrios Orfanopoulos	Greece (GRE)	1:29:26	
90	Tomáš Hlavenka	Czech Republic (CZE)	1:29:27	
91	Graham White	Great Britain (GBR)	1:29:27	
92	Birger Fält	Sweden (SWE)	1:29:29	
93	Marius Kristiansen	Norway (NOR)	1:29:47	
94	Sandis Sarna	Latvia (LAT)	1:29:51	
95	Paul Copeland	Australia (AUS)	1:29:53	
96	Nelson Funes	Guatemala (GUA)	1:29:55	
97	Marco Sowa	Luxembourg (LUX)	1:29:55	
98	Gergely Zaborszky	Hungary (HUN)	1:30:03	
99	Zbignevas Stankevičius	Lithuania (LTU)	1:30:38	
100	Roman Bílek	Czech Republic (CZE)	1:30:57	
101	André Höhne	Germany (GER)	1:31:07	
102	Tim Seaman	United States (USA)	1:31:12	
103	Sabir Sharuyayev	Kazakhstan (KAZ)	1:31:16	
104	Balay Thirukumaran	Malaysia (MAS)	1:31:17	
105	Sidinei Rodrigues	Brazil (BRA)	1:31:29	
106	Riecus Blignaut	South Africa (RSA)	1:31:32	
107	Hamed Farag	Egypt (EGY)	1:31:51	
108	Klaus Jensen	Denmark (DEN)	1:31:56	
109	Abdulkader Öz	Turkey (TUR)	1:32:40	
110	Teoh Boon Lim	Malaysia (MAS)	1:32:51	
111	Dave McGovern	United States (USA)	1:33:29	
112	András Gyöngyi	Hungary (HUN)	1:33:36	
113	Stefan Wögerbauer	Austria (AUT)	1:34:33	
114	Jacques Lubbe	South Africa (RSA)	1:34:45	
115	Claus Jørgensen	Denmark (DEN)	1:34:54	
116	Martin Engelsviken	Norway (NOR)	1:35:03	
117	Saravanin Govindasamy	Malaysia (MAS)	1:35:16	
118	Karsten Godtfredsen	Denmark (DEN)	1:35:43	
119	Yeóryios Aryirópoulos	Greece (GRE)	1:35:46	
120	Ioánnis Maris	Greece (GRE)	1:35:46	
121	Nenad Filipović	Yugoslavia (YUG)	1:36:22	
122	Bernard Binggeli	Switzerland (SUI)	1:37:04	
123	Nicolás Soto	Puerto Rico (PUR)	1:38:39	
124	Rami Al-Deeb	Palestine (PLE)	1:39:13	
125	Renzo Toscanelli	Switzerland (SUI)	1:39:32	
126	Daniele Carrobio	Switzerland (SUI)	1:40:50	
127	Zoran Ivanković	Yugoslavia (YUG)	1:48:39	
128	Johann Siegele	Austria (AUT)	1:48:50	
129	Dietmar Hirschmugl	Austria (AUT)	1:49:31	
130	Wilfried Siegele	Austria (AUT)	1:50:14	
131	Dip Chand	Fiji (FIJ)	1:50:29	
132	Pradeep Chand	Fiji (FIJ)	1:50:31	
133	Caleb Maybir	Fiji (FIJ)	1:55:07	
—	Tan Mingjun	China (CHN)	DQ	
—	Bernardo Segura	Mexico (MEX)	DQ	
—	Daniel Plaza	Spain (ESP)	DQ	Doping^{†}
—	Darrell Stone	Great Britain (GBR)	DNF	
—	Alejandro López	Mexico (MEX)	DNF	
—	Konrad Morawczyński	Poland (POL)	DNF	
—	Johan Moerdyk	South Africa (RSA)	DNF	

^{†}: Daniel Plaza from Spain was initially 20th (1:20:40), but disqualified because of doping violations.

==== Team (20 km men) ====
The list below as published in the source might not be corrected in respect to the doping disqualification.

Place	Country	Points
1st place, gold medalist(s)	Russia	431 pts
2nd place, silver medalist(s)	Belarus	413 pts
3rd place, bronze medalist(s)	Mexico	403 pts
4	Italy	392 pts
5	Spain	388 pts
6	France	378 pts
7	Portugal	357 pts
8	Slovakia	356 pts
9	Australia	347 pts
10	Guatemala	344 pts
11	Latvia	328 pts
12	Kazakhstan	325 pts
13	Brazil	318 pts
14	Germany	312 pts
15	Lithuania	310 pts
16	Poland	310 pts
17	Ukraine	300 pts
18	Hungary	297 pts
19	Czech Republic	291 pts
20	United States	269 pts
21	Sweden	262 pts
22	China	258 pts
23	South Africa	247 pts
24	United Kingdom	241 pts
25	Malaysia	230 pts
26	FR Yugoslavia	221 pts
27	Norway	215 pts
28	Greece	196 pts
29	Denmark	191 pts
30	Austria	165 pts
31	Switzerland	164 pts
32	Fiji	144 pts

=== Men's 50 km ===
Place	Athlete	Nation	Time	Notes
1st place, gold medalist(s)	Jesús Ángel García	Spain (ESP)	3:39:54	
2nd place, silver medalist(s)	Oleg Ishutkin	Russia (RUS)	3:40:12	
3rd place, bronze medalist(s)	Valentin Kononen	Finland (FIN)	3:41:09	
4	Nikolay Matyukhin	Russia (RUS)	3:41:36	
5	Tomasz Lipiec	Poland (POL)	3:41:58	
6	Miguel Rodríguez	Mexico (MEX)	3:42:45	
7	Sylvain Caudron	France (FRA)	3:46:38	
8	René Piller	France (FRA)	3:47:19	
9	Roman Mrázek	Slovakia (SVK)	3:48:22	
10	Andrey Plotnikov	Russia (RUS)	3:48:35	
11	Štefan Malík	Slovakia (SVK)	3:48:52	
12	Viktor Ginko	Belarus (BLR)	3:49:23	
13	Zoltán Czukor	Hungary (HUN)	3:50:26	
14	Oleg Merkulov	Russia (RUS)	3:50:31	
15	Thomas Wallstab	Germany (GER)	3:51:19	
16	Peter Tichý	Slovakia (SVK)	3:51:30	
17	Jan Holender	Poland (POL)	3:52:48	
18	Ma Hongye	China (CHN)	3:52:58	
19	Dmitriy Savaytan	Belarus (BLR)	3:53:35	
20	Peter Zanner	Germany (GER)	3:54:17	
21	Santiago Pérez	Spain (ESP)	3:54:28	
22	Germán Sánchez	Mexico (MEX)	3:54:31	
23	Orazio Romanzi	Italy (ITA)	3:54:55	
24	Jaime Barroso	Spain (ESP)	3:55:04	
25	Ruben Arikado	Mexico (MEX)	3:55:05	
26	Massimo Fizialetti	Italy (ITA)	3:55:16	
27	Arturo Di Mezza	Italy (ITA)	3:55:42	
28	Miloš Holuša	Czech Republic (CZE)	3:55:52	
29	Paolo Bianchi	Italy (ITA)	3:57:28	
30	José Magalhães	Portugal (POR)	3:57:30	
31	Denis Trautmann	Germany (GER)	3:57:58	
32	Christophe Cousin	France (FRA)	3:59:00	
33	Alain Lemercier	France (FRA)	3:59:49	
34	Julio Urías	Guatemala (GUA)	4:00:12	
35	Alexaev Novikov	Belarus (BLR)	4:00:42	
36	Yu Chaohong	China (CHN)	4:00:47	
37	José Manuel Rodríguez	Spain (ESP)	4:00:50	
38	Anatoliy Gorshkov	Ukraine (UKR)	4:01:01	
39	Dirk Nicque	Belgium (BEL)	4:02:55	
40	Jaroslav Makovec	Czech Republic (CZE)	4:03:15	
41	Ervin Leczky	Hungary (HUN)	4:03:46	
42	Chris Maddocks	Great Britain (GBR)	4:05:42	
43	Antero Lindman	Finland (FIN)	4:06:55	
44	Andrzej Chylinski	United States (USA)	4:07:15	
45	Duane Cousins	Australia (AUS)	4:07:17	
46	Bo Gustafsson	Sweden (SWE)	4:07:36	
47	Hrístos Karayeóryios	Greece (GRE)	4:07:54	
48	Mikel Odriozola	Spain (ESP)	4:08:07	
49	Vitaliy Gordey	Belarus (BLR)	4:08:27	
50	Francisco Pantoja	Mexico (MEX)	4:08:47	
51	Gábor Lengyel	Hungary (HUN)	4:09:13	
52	Fredrik Svensson	Sweden (SWE)	4:09:22	
53	Jean-Marc Starck	France (FRA)	4:09:52	
54	Juha Kinnunen	Finland (FIN)	4:09:57	
55	Peter Korčok	Slovakia (SVK)	4:10:02	
56	Chris Cheeseman	Great Britain (GBR)	4:10:23	
57	František Kmenta	Czech Republic (CZE)	4:10:45	
58	Henk Plasman	Netherlands (NED)	4:11:37	
59	Ulf-Peter Sjöholm	Sweden (SWE)	4:11:53	
60	Virgilho Soares	Portugal (POR)	4:12:20	
61	Stanisław Stosik	Poland (POL)	4:13:07	
62	Mark Green	United States (USA)	4:13:16	
63	Hugo López	Guatemala (GUA)	4:13:43	
64	Michael Harvey	Australia (AUS)	4:14:09	
65	Dominic McGrath	Australia (AUS)	4:14:49	
66	Les Morton	Great Britain (GBR)	4:16:12	
67	Karl Atton	Great Britain (GBR)	4:16:30	
68	Marco Evoniuk	United States (USA)	4:17:24	
69	Harold van Beek	Netherlands (NED)	4:17:46	
70	Marcel van Gemert	Netherlands (NED)	4:18:59	
71	Vladimir Soyka	Ukraine (UKR)	4:19:31	
72	Carl Schueler	United States (USA)	4:19:46	
73	Aleksey Shelest	Ukraine (UKR)	4:20:32	
74	Jiří Mašita	Czech Republic (CZE)	4:22:18	
75	Anatoliy Malivskiy	Ukraine (UKR)	4:22:49	
76	Balázs Tóth	Hungary (HUN)	4:24:35	
77	Jacob Sørensen	Denmark (DEN)	4:25:53	
78	Andreas Paspaliaris	Greece (GRE)	4:26:43	
79	Shane Pearson	Australia (AUS)	4:28:53	
80	Pedro Huntjens	Netherlands (NED)	4:29:18	
81	Karoly Kirszt	Hungary (HUN)	4:32:33	
82	Miloš Zedník	Czech Republic (CZE)	4:35:48	
83	José Pinto	Portugal (POR)	4:38:00	
84	Luc Nicque	Belgium (BEL)	4:39:33	
85	Bernard Cossy	Switzerland (SUI)	4:44:13	
86	Kees Lambrechts	Netherlands (NED)	4:49:58	
87	Saturnino Salazar	Philippines (PHI)	4:58:48	
88	Frank Buytaert	Belgium (BEL)	5:08:19	
—	Tim Berrett	Canada (CAN)	DQ	
—	Zhang Huiqiang	China (CHN)	DQ	
—	Craig Barrett	New Zealand (NZL)	DQ	
—	Manuel Oyao	Philippines (PHI)	DQ	
—	Jacek Müller	Poland (POL)	DQ	
—	Roby Ponzio	Switzerland (SUI)	DQ	
—	Anton Trotskiy	Belarus (BLR)	DNF	
—	Zhao Yongsheng	China (CHN)	DNF	
—	Axel Noack	Germany (GER)	DNF	
—	Mynor Vasquez	Guatemala (GUA)	DNF	
—	Giovanni Perricelli	Italy (ITA)	DNF	
—	Ignacio Zamudio	Mexico (MEX)	DNF	
—	Sonny Díaz	Philippines (PHI)	DNF	
—	Luís Ribeiro	Portugal (POR)	DNF	
—	German Skurygin	Russia (RUS)	DNF	
—	Pascal Charrière	Switzerland (SUI)	DNF	
—	Peter Malik	Slovakia (SVK)	DNF	
—	Peter Ferrari	Sweden (SWE)	DNF	
—	Vitaliy Popovich	Ukraine (UKR)	DNF	
—	Jonathan Matthews	United States (USA)	DNF	

==== Team (50 km men) ====
Place	Country	Points
1st place, gold medalist(s)	Russia	434 pts
2nd place, silver medalist(s)	Slovakia	415 pts
3rd place, bronze medalist(s)	Spain	407 pts
4	France	405 pts
5	Mexico	399 pts
6	Belarus	388 pts
7	Germany	388 pts
8	Poland	377 pts
9	Italy	377 pts
10	Finland	362 pts
11	Hungary	356 pts
12	Czech Republic	339 pts
13	Sweden	313 pts
14	United Kingdom	308 pts
15	Portugal	306 pts
16	United States	299 pts
17	Australia	298 pts
18	Ukraine	293 pts
19	Netherlands	282 pts
20	Belgium	280 pts
21	China	250 pts
22	Guatemala	215 pts
23	Switzerland	83 pts
24	Philippines	82 pts

=== Lugano Trophy (combined team men) ===
The results list as published in the source contains some obvious errors that were tentatively corrected. Moreover, there are inconsistencies when summing up the points of the 20 km and 50 km team results and the results list as published in the source. It is speculated that the 20 km team results might not be corrected in respect to the doping disqualification.

Place	Country	Points
1st place, gold medalist(s)	Russia	865 pts
2nd place, silver medalist(s)	Mexico	803 pts
3rd place, bronze medalist(s)	Belarus	802 pts
4	France	785 pts
5	Slovakia	772 pts
6	Spain	771 pts
7	Italy	771 pts
8	Germany	702 pts
9	Poland	688 pts
10	Portugal	666 pts
11	Hungary	654 pts
12	Australia	645 pts
13	Czech Republic	630 pts
14	Ukraine	594 pts
15	Sweden	575 pts
16	United States	568 pts
17	Guatemala	560 pts
18	United Kingdom	549 pts
19	China	509 pts
20	Finland	362 pts
21	Latvia	329 pts
22	Kazakhstan	327 pts
23	Brazil	320 pts
24	Lithuania	311 pts
25	Netherlands	282 pts
26	Belgium	280 pts
27	South Africa	247 pts
28	Switzerland	247 pts
29	Malaysia	230 pts
30	FR Yugoslavia	222 pts
31	Norway	215 pts
32	Greece	196 pts
33	Denmark	191 pts
34	Austria	165 pts
35	Fiji	144 pts
36	Philippines	82 pts

=== Women's 10 km ===
Place	Athlete	Nation	Time	Notes
1st place, gold medalist(s)	Irina Stankina	Russia (RUS)	41:52	
2nd place, silver medalist(s)	Olimpiada Ivanova	Russia (RUS)	41:59	
3rd place, bronze medalist(s)	Gu Yan	China (CHN)	42:15	
4	Erica Alfridi	Italy (ITA)	42:31	
5	Rossella Giordano	Italy (ITA)	42:37	
6	Annarita Sidoti	Italy (ITA)	42:41	
7	Larisa Khmelnitskaya	Belarus (BLR)	42:46	
8	Tamara Kovalenko	Russia (RUS)	42:51	
9	Beate Gummelt	Germany (GER)	42:52	
10	Wang Liping	China (CHN)	42:53	
11	Valentina Tsybulskaya	Belarus (BLR)	42:54	
12	Liu Hongyu	China (CHN)	42:57	
13	Olga Kardopoltseva	Belarus (BLR)	43:08	
14	Nataliya Misyulya	Belarus (BLR)	43:08	
15	Olga Panfyorova	Russia (RUS)	43:08	
16	Yelena Sayko	Russia (RUS)	43:20	
17	Norica Câmpean	Romania (ROM)	43:21	
18	Lyudmila Dolgopolova	Belarus (BLR)	43:32	
19	Anikó Szebenszky	Hungary (HUN)	43:41	
20	Mária Urbanik	Hungary (HUN)	43:41	
21	Maya Sazonova	Kazakhstan (KAZ)	43:52	
22	María Vasco	Spain (ESP)	43:54	
23	Wang Yuntao	China (CHN)	43:55	
24	Kathrin Born-Boyde	Germany (GER)	44:00	
25	Elisabetta Perrone	Italy (ITA)	44:10	
26	Anita Liepiņa	Latvia (LAT)	44:29	
27	Valentina Savchuk	Ukraine (UKR)	44:30	
28	Kong Yan	China (CHN)	44:35	
29	Cristiana Pellino	Italy (ITA)	44:36	
30	Rie Mitsumori	Japan (JPN)	44:39	
31	Graciela Mendoza	Mexico (MEX)	44:48	
32	Yuka Kamioka	Japan (JPN)	44:52	
33	Francisca Martínez	Mexico (MEX)	44:58	
34	Claudia Iovan	Romania (ROU)	45:03	
35	Geovana Irusta	Bolivia (BOL)	45:03	
36	Vira Zozulya	Ukraine (UKR)	45:07	
37	Svetlana Tolstaya	Kazakhstan (KAZ)	45:09	
38	Nathalie Marchand-Fortain	France (FRA)	45:10	
39	Ryoko Sakakura	Japan (JPN)	45:14	
40	Jane Saville	Australia (AUS)	45:19	
41	Jill Maybir-Barrett	Australia (AUS)	45:20	
42	Tina Poitras	Canada (CAN)	45:21	
43	Svitlana Kalitka	Ukraine (UKR)	45:25	
44	Celia Marcén	Spain (ESP)	45:25	
45	Cheng Tong Lean	Malaysia (MAS)	45:27	
46	Annastasia Raj	Malaysia (MAS)	45:29	
47	Ildikó Ilyés	Hungary (HUN)	45:56	
48	Natalie Saville	Australia (AUS)	46:19	
49	Nora Leksir	France (FRA)	46:29	
50	Victoria Herazo	United States (USA)	46:31	
51	Gabriele Herold	Germany (GER)	46:33	
52	Sofia Avoila	Portugal (POR)	46:36	
53	Simone Wolowiec	Australia (AUS)	46:45	
54	Melanie Seeger	Germany (GER)	46:49	
55	Fatiha Ouali	France (FRA)	46:55	
56	Andrea Szabó	Hungary (HUN)	46:58	
57	Victoria Palacios	Mexico (MEX)	47:06	
58	Vicky Lupton	Great Britain (GBR)	47:16	
60	Wendy Muldoon	Australia (AUS)	47:22	
61	Joanne Dow	United States (USA)	47:23	
62	Isilda Gonçalves	Portugal (POR)	47:23	
63	María Guadalupe Sánchez	Mexico (MEX)	47:24	
64	Sonata Milušauskaitė	Lithuania (LTU)	47:28	
65	Kristina Saltanovič	Lithuania (LTU)	47:31	
66	Gretchen Eastler	United States (USA)	47:45	
67	Joni Bender	Canada (CAN)	47:50	
68	Rocío Florido	Spain (ESP)	48:00	
69	Mónika Pesti	Hungary (HUN)	48:06	
70	Ivonne Varas	Mexico (MEX)	48:11	
71	Valérie Lévèque-Nadaud	France (FRA)	48:13	
72	Hanne Liland	Norway (NOR)	48:22	
73	Dana Yarbrough	United States (USA)	48:26	
74	Zuzana Zemková	Slovakia (SVK)	48:34	
75	Laura Ferreiro	Spain (ESP)	48:45	
76	Tatiana Denize	France (FRA)	48:46	
77	Anne Haaland Simonsen	Norway (NOR)	48:49	
78	Iveta Skadmane	Latvia (LAT)	48:56	
79	Hilde Gustafsen	Norway (NOR)	49:00	
80	Sylvia Saunders/Black	Great Britain (GBR)	49:00	
81	Bożena Górecka	Poland (POL)	49:06	
82	Sara Standley	United States (USA)	49:22	
83	Mária Gáliková	Slovakia (SVK)	49:28	
84	Yelena Kuznetsova	Kazakhstan (KAZ)	49:33	
85	Blanka Kožíková	Czech Republic (CZE)	49:36	
86	Ligia Gonçalves	Portugal (POR)	49:37	
87	Aleksandra Kot	Poland (POL)	49:37	
88	Zuzana Blažeková	Slovakia (SVK)	49:46	
89	Elina Risto	Finland (FIN)	49:48	
90	Nagwa Ibrahim	Egypt (EGY)	49:51	
91	Hristína Kokótou	Greece (GRE)	49:55	
92	Jonna Voronkoff	Finland (FIN)	50:11	
93	Krista Ranta-Pere	Finland (FIN)	50:13	
94	Verity Larby-Snook	Great Britain (GBR)	50:14	
95	Tamara Heroldová	Czech Republic (CZE)	50:21	
96	Anna Brnová	Slovakia (SVK)	50:22	
97	Tarja Jaskari	Finland (FIN)	50:38	
98	Gražina Kiliūtė	Lithuania (LTU)	50:40	
99	Monika Bańka	Poland (POL)	50:56	
100	Susan Hornung	Canada (CAN)	51:17	
101	Lisa Crump	Great Britain (GBR)	51:20	
102	Kaisa Suhonen	Finland (FIN)	51:54	
103	Nancy Lai	Malaysia (MAS)	52:13	
104	Dana Vavřačová	Czech Republic (CZE)	52:33	
105	Kamila Holpuchová	Czech Republic (CZE)	52:58	
106	Lena Launikonytė	Lithuania (LTU)	53:13	
107	Eva Seidlova	Slovakia (SVK)	53:18	
108	Pavla Choderová	Czech Republic (CZE)	53:33	
109	Anica Djokic	Yugoslavia (YUG)	56:11	
110	Maja Vucijevic	Yugoslavia (YUG)	56:26	
111	Yeliz Ay	Turkey (TUR)	58:43	
112	Jelena Jeremic	Yugoslavia (YUG)	59:15	
—	Teoh Tay Wah	Malaysia (MAS)	DQ	
—	Yelena Veremeychuk	Ukraine (UKR)	DQ	
—	Encarna Granados	Spain (ESP)	DNF	
—	Jolanta Dukure	Latvia (LAT)	DNF	
—	Susana Feitór	Portugal (POR)	DNF	

==== Team (women) ====
Place	Country	Points
1st place, gold medalist(s)	Russia	440 pts
2nd place, silver medalist(s)	Italy	435 pts
3rd place, bronze medalist(s)	China	425 pts
4	Belarus	419 pts
5	Hungary	380 pts
6	Germany	379 pts
7	Japan	373 pts
8	Ukraine	366 pts
9	Mexico	356 pts
10	Australia	345 pts
11	Spain	342 pts
12	Kazakhstan	341 pts
13	France	334 pts
14	United States	308 pts
15	Malaysia	297 pts
16	Portugal	292 pts
17	Canada	286 pts
18	Norway	279 pts
19	Lithuania	274 pts
20	United Kingdom	270 pts
21	Slovakia	265 pts
22	Poland	247 pts
23	Finland	239 pts
24	Czech Republic	233 pts
25	Latvia	222 pts
26	FR Yugoslavia	206 pts

== Participation ==
The participation of 365 athletes (248 men/117 women) from 47 countries is reported.

- Australia (9/5)
- Austria (4/-)
- Belarus (9/5)
- Belgium (3/-)
- Bolivia (-/1)
- Brazil (4/-)
- Canada (2/3)
- China (7/5)
- Czech Republic (10/5)
- Denmark (4/-)
- Ecuador (1/-)
- Egypt (1/1)
- Fiji (3/-)
- Finland (3/5)
- France (10/5)
- Germany (7/4)
- Greece (5/1)
- Guatemala (7/-)
- Hungary (9/5)
- Italy (10/5)
- Japan (1/3)
- Kazakhstan (4/3)
- Latvia (4/3)
- Lithuania (5/4)
- Luxembourg (1/-)
- Malaysia (4/4)
- Mexico (10/5)
- Netherlands (5/-)
- New Zealand (1/-)
- Norway (3/3)
- Palestine (1/-)
- Philippines (3/-)
- Poland (8/3)
- Portugal (9/4)
- Puerto Rico (1/-)
- Romania (-/2)
- Russia (10/5)
- Slovakia (10/5)
- South Africa (5/-)
- Spain (10/5)
- Sweden (7/-)
- Switzerland (6/-)
- Turkey (1/1)
- Ukraine (10/4)
- United Kingdom (8/4)
- United States (10/5)
- (Federal Republic of Yugoslavia) Yugoslavia (3/3)

== See also ==
- 1997 Race Walking Year Ranking
