= 2002 European Athletics Championships – Men's 20 kilometres walk =

Men's 20 kilometres walk at the European Athletics Championships

These are the official results of the men's 20 km walk event at the 2002 European Championships in Munich, Germany, held on August 6, 2002. Spain's Paquillo Fernández set a new championships record, clocking a total time of 1:18:37, eight seconds faster than the winning time set by Russia's Mikhail Shchennikov in 1994.

== Medalists ==
Gold	Paquillo Fernández; Spain (ESP)
Silver	Vladimir Andreyev; Russia (RUS)
Bronze	Juan Manuel Molina; Spain (ESP)

== Abbreviations ==
- All times shown are in hours:minutes:seconds

DNS	did not start
NM	no mark
WR	world record
WL	world leading
AR	area record
CR	event record
NR	national record
PB	personal best
SB	season best

== Records ==
Standing records prior to the 2002 European Athletics Championships
World Record	Paquillo Fernández (ESP)	1:17:22	April 28, 2002	Turku, Finland
Event Record	Mikhail Shchennikov (RUS)	1:18:45	April 8, 1994	Helsinki, Finland
Standing records after the 2002 European Athletics Championships
Event Record	Paquillo Fernández (ESP)	1:18:37	August 6, 2002	Munich, Germany

== Final ==
Rank	Athlete	Time	Note
1st place, gold medalist(s)	Paquillo Fernández (ESP)	1:18:37	CR
2nd place, silver medalist(s)	Vladimir Andreyev (RUS)	1:19:56	
3rd place, bronze medalist(s)	Juan Manuel Molina (ESP)	1:20:36	
4	Viktor Burayev (RUS)	1:20:36	SB
5	Ivan Trotski (BLR)	1:20:52	SB
6	Yevgeniy Misyulya (BLR)	1:20:56	SB
7	Alessandro Gandellini (ITA)	1:21:03	SB
8	Robert Heffernan (IRL)	1:21:10	
9	Lorenzo Civallero (ITA)	1:21:21	SB
10	Andrey Stadnichuk (RUS)	1:21:29	
11	André Höhne (GER)	1:21:38	SB
12	João Vieira (POR)	1:21:55	
13	Jiří Malysa (CZE)	1:22:12	SB
14	Roman Magdziarczyk (POL)	1:22:57	
15	Benjamin Kuciński (POL)	1:24:38	
16	Augusto Cardoso (POR)	1:24:59	
16	Erik Tysse (NOR)	1:25:06	
17	Peter Barto (SVK)	1:25:36	SB
18	Jan Albrecht (GER)	1:25:58	
19	Miloš Holuša (CZE)	1:26:03	
20	Theodoros Stamatopoulos (GRE)	1:25:53	
21	Radovan Elko (SVK)	1:27:47	
22	Milan Batovsky (SVK)	1:28:54	
DISQUALIFIED (DQ)
—	Andrew Drake (GBR)	DQ	
—	Andrey Makarov (BLR)	DQ	
—	Michele Didoni (ITA)	DQ	
—	Predrag Filipović (YUG)	DQ	
—	Elefthérios Thanópoulos (GRE)	DQ	
—	Gintaras Andriuškevičius (LTU)	DQ	

== See also ==
- 2002 Race Walking Year Ranking
