= 1996 World Junior Championships in Athletics – Women's 5000 metres walk =

The women's 5000 metres walk event at the 1996 World Junior Championships in Athletics was held in Sydney, Australia, at International Athletic Centre on 24 August.

== Medalists ==
Gold	Irina Stankina; Russia
Silver	Olga Panfyorova; Russia
Bronze	Claudia Iovan; Romania

== Results ==
=== Final ===
24 August

Rank	Name	Nationality	Time	Notes
1st place, gold medalist(s)	Irina Stankina	Russia	21:31.85	
2nd place, silver medalist(s)	Olga Panfyorova	Russia	21:52.27	
3rd place, bronze medalist(s)	Claudia Iovan	Romania	21:57.11	
4	Melanie Seeger	Germany	22:11.29	
5	Nie Yulin	China	22:23.41	
6	Linda Coffee	Australia	22:34.77	
7	Abigail Saenz	Mexico	22:37.68	
8	Gabriele Herold	Germany	22:42.62	
9	Laura Ferreiro	Spain	22:42.96	
10	Aya Kamikawa	Japan	22:47.36	
11	Krista Ranta-Pere	Finland	22:50.13	
12	Takako Terui	Japan	22:52.13	
13	Elke Ennemoser	Italy	23:22.92	
14	Rosaleigh Commerford	Ireland	23:29.73	
15	Barbara Tóth	Hungary	23:30.57	
16	Annarita Fidanza	Italy	23:33.40	
17	Park Mi-Ri	South Korea	23:34.68	
18	Sandra Monteiro	Portugal	24:15.98	
19	Andreia Pedro	Brazil	24:28.03	
20	Tânia Spindler	Brazil	25:00.47	
21	Nina Howley	United Kingdom	25:12.23	
22	Inês Henriques	Portugal	25:17.22	
23	Anya-Marie Ruoss	United States	25:43.48	
24	Alison Zabrenski	United States	26:56.56	
	Natalie Saville	Australia	DQ	

== Participation ==
According to an unofficial count, 25 athletes from 17 countries participated in the event.

- Australia (2)
- Brazil (2)
- China (1)
- Finland (1)
- Germany (2)
- Hungary (1)
- Ireland (1)
- Italy (2)
- Japan (2)
- Mexico (1)
- Portugal (2)
- Romania (1)
- Russia (2)
- South Korea (1)
- Spain (1)
- United Kingdom (1)
- United States (2)
