= 2002 European Athletics Championships – Men's 50 kilometres walk =

Competition at the Track and Field European Championship 2002

Men's 50 kilometres walk at the European Athletics Championships

These are the official results of the Men's 50 km walk event at the 2002 European Championships in Munich, Germany, held on August 8, 2002. Poland's Robert Korzeniowski set a new world record, clocking a total time of 3:36:39, defeating Valeriy Spitsyn's 3:37:26 from May 21, 2000 set in Moscow, Russia.

== Medalists ==
Gold	Robert Korzeniowski; Poland (POL)
Silver	Aleksey Voyevodin; Russia (RUS)
Bronze	Jesús Ángel García; Spain (ESP)

== Abbreviations ==
- All times shown are in hours:minutes:seconds

DNS	did not start
NM	no mark
WR	world record
WL	world leading
AR	area record
CR	event record
NR	national record
PB	personal best
SB	season best

== Records ==
Standing records prior to the 2002 European Athletics Championships
World Record	Valeriy Spitsyn (RUS)	3:37:26	May 21, 2000	Moscow, Russia
Event Record	Hartwig Gauder (GDR)	3:40:55	August 31, 1986	(Finland) Stuttgart, West Germany
Standing records after the 2002 European Athletics Championships
World Record	Robert Korzeniowski (POL)	3:36:39	August 8, 2002	Munich, Germany
Event Record	Robert Korzeniowski (POL)	3:36:39	August 8, 2002	Munich, Germany

== Final ==
Rank	Athlete	Time	Note
1st place, gold medalist(s)	Robert Korzeniowski (POL)	3:36:39	WR
2nd place, silver medalist(s)	Aleksey Voyevodin (RUS)	3:40:16	SB
3rd place, bronze medalist(s)	Jesús Ángel García (ESP)	3:44:33	SB
4	German Skurygin (RUS)	3:48:58	
5	Trond Nymark (NOR)	3:50:16	
6	Denis Langlois (FRA)	3:50:47	SB
7	Aleksandar Raković (YUG)	3:51:47	SB
8	Francesco Galdenzi (ITA)	3:52:17	
9	Modris Liepiņš (LAT)	3:52:36	SB
10	Grzegorz Sudoł (POL)	3:54:35	
11	Peter Korčok (SVK)	3:55:34	
12	Santiago Pérez (ESP)	3:55:50	
13	Fredrik Svensson (SWE)	3:56:32	SB
14	Spiridon Kastanis (GRE)	4:00:31	SB
15	David Boulanger (FRA)	4:03:20	SB
16	Pedro Martins (POR)	4:03:39	
17	Bengt Bengtsson (SWE)	4:07:03	
18	René Piller (FRA)	4:07:20	SB
19	Uģis Brūvelis (LAT)	4:14:39	
20	Marek Janek (SVK)	4:19:08	
DISQUALIFIED (DQ)
—	Jiří Malysa (CZE)	DQ	
—	Yuriy Andronov (RUS)	DQ	
—	Tomasz Lipiec (POL)	DQ	
—	Jamie Costin (IRL)	DQ	
—	Jacob Sørensen (DEN)	DQ	
—	Mikel Odriozola (ESP)	DQ	
—	Giovanni de Benedictis (ITA)	DQ	
—	Martin Pupis (SVK)	DQ	
DID NOT FINISH (DNF)
—	Marco Giungi (ITA)	DNF	
—	Jorge Costa (POR)	DNF	
DID NOT START (DNS)
—	Miloš Holuša (CZE)	DNS	

== See also ==
- 2002 Race Walking Year Ranking
