= 1997 European Athletics U23 Championships – Women's 10 kilometres walk =

The women's 10 kilometres race walk event at the 1997 European Athletics U23 Championships was held in Turku, Finland, on 10 July 1997.

== Medalists ==
Gold	Olga Panfyorova; Russia
Silver	María Vasco; Spain
Bronze	Susana Feitor; Portugal

== Results ==
=== Final ===
10 July

Rank	Name	Nationality	Time	Notes
1st place, gold medalist(s)	Olga Panfyorova	Russia	43:33	
2nd place, silver medalist(s)	María Vasco	Spain	44:01	
3rd place, bronze medalist(s)	Susana Feitor	Portugal	44:26	
4	Valentina Savchuk	Ukraine	44:26	
5	Sofia Avoila	Portugal	45:48	
6	Eva Pérez	Spain	46:05	
7	Mónika Pesti	Hungary	46:20	
8	Melanie Seeger	Germany	46:34	
9	Gillian O'Sullivan	Ireland	50:19	
	Margarita Nazarova	Russia	DQ	

== Participation ==
According to an unofficial count, 10 athletes from 7 countries participated in the event.

- Germany (1)
- Hungary (1)
- Ireland (1)
- Portugal (2)
- Russia (2)
- Spain (2)
- Ukraine (1)
