= 2002 European Athletics Championships – Women's 20 kilometres walk =

Women's 20 kilometres walk at the European Athletics Championships

These are the official results of the Women's 20 km walk event at the 2002 European Championships in Munich, Germany, held on August 7, 2002. The women's 20 km walk event replaced the 10 km walk, which was run since the 1986 edition of the European Championships.

== Medalists ==
Gold	Olimpiada Ivanova; Russia (RUS)
Silver	Yelena Nikolayeva; Russia (RUS)
Bronze	Erica Alfridi; Italy (ITA)

== Abbreviations ==
- All times shown are in hours:minutes:seconds

DNS	did not start
NM	no mark
WR	world record
WL	world leading
AR	area record
NR	national record
PB	personal best
SB	season best

== Records ==
Standing records prior to the 2002 European Athletics Championships
World Record	Olimpiada Ivanova (RUS)	1:24.50	March 4, 2001	Adler, Russia
Event Record	New Event			

== Final ==
Rank	Athlete	Time	Note
1st place, gold medalist(s)	Olimpiada Ivanova (RUS)	1:26:42	SB
2nd place, silver medalist(s)	Yelena Nikolayeva (RUS)	1:28:20	
3rd place, bronze medalist(s)	Erica Alfridi (ITA)	1:28:33	SB
4	Gillian O'Sullivan (IRL)	1:28:46	SB
5	Claudia Stef (ROM)	1:29:57	SB
6	Elisabetta Perrone (ITA)	1:30:25	SB
7	Kristina Saltanovič (LTU)	1:30:44	SB
8	Annarita Sidoti (ITA)	1:31:19	
9	Athanasia Tsoumeleka (GRE)	1:31:25	SB
10	Eva Pérez (ESP)	1:31:38	SB
11	Athina Papayianni (GRE)	1:31:45	SB
12	Beatriz Pascual (ESP)	1:32:38	SB
13	Olive Loughnane (IRL)	1:33:08	
14	Melanie Seeger (GER)	1:33:40	
15	Inês Henriques (POR)	1:35:07	SB
16	Nevena Mineva (BUL)	1:35:28	
17	Vera Santos (POR)	1:37:19	
DID NOT FINISH (DNF)
—	María Vasco (ESP)	DNF	
—	Sonata Milušauskaitė (LTU)	DNF	
—	Susana Feitor (POR)	DNF	
—	Jolanta Dukure (LAT)	DNF	
—	Natalya Fedoskina (RUS)	DNF	
DISQUALIFIED (DQ)
—	Yelena Ginko (BLR)	DQ	
—	Kjersti Plätzer (NOR)	DQ	
—	Olga Lukyanchuk (UKR)	DQ	
—	Norica Câmpean (ROM)	DQ	

== See also ==
- 1999 Women's World Championships 20km Walk (Seville)
- 2000 Women's Olympic 20km Walk (Sydney)
- 2001 Women's World Championships 20km Walk (Edmonton)
- 2002 Race Walking Year Ranking
- 2003 Women's World Championships 20km Walk (Paris)
- 2004 Women's Olympic 20km Walk (Athens)
- 2005 Women's World Championships 20km Walk (Helsinki)
