= 1999 European Athletics U23 Championships – Women's 20 kilometres walk =

The women's 20 kilometres race walk event at the 1999 European Athletics U23 Championships was held in Gothenburg, Sweden, on 31 July 1999.

== Medalists ==
Gold	Claudia Iovan; Romania
Silver	Lyudmila Dedekina; Russia
Bronze	Melanie Seeger; Germany

== Results ==
=== Final ===
31 July

Rank	Name	Nationality	Time	Notes
1st place, gold medalist(s)	Claudia Iovan	Romania	1:33:17	CR
2nd place, silver medalist(s)	Lyudmila Dedekina	Russia	1:34:02	
3rd place, bronze medalist(s)	Melanie Seeger	Germany	1:34:17	
4	Vanessa Espinosa	Spain	1:34:38	
5	Lisa Barbieri	Italy	1:35:32	
6	Monica Svensson	Sweden	1:37:07	
7	Elin Loftesnes	Norway	1:40:.51	
8	Irina Kovalchuk	Ukraine	1:41:00	
9	Magdalena Jacobsson	Sweden	1:45:13	
10	Gabriele Herold	Germany	1:46:09	
	Jolanta Dukure	Latvia	DQ	

== Participation ==
According to an unofficial count, 11 athletes from 9 countries participated in the event.

- Germany (2)
- Italy (1)
- Latvia (1)
- Norway (1)
- Romania (1)
- Russia (1)
- Spain (1)
- Sweden (2)
- Ukraine (1)
