= List of doping cases in sport by substance =

This is a list of doping in sport cases, or known cases of performance-enhancing substance use by professional athletes.

== Anabolic steroids ==
=== Boldenone undecylenate ===
- Tennis: on 15 January 2020, it was revealed that Wimbledon doubles champion Robert Farah was tested positive for boldenone towards the end of the 2019 season.
- Baseball: Boldenone is among the substances banned by Major League Baseball, as well as most other major athletic organizations. Los Angeles Angels minor league outfielder Reynaldo Ruiz in September 2010 and Philadelphia Phillies minor league pitcher San Lazaro Solano in January 2011 each received a 50-game suspension for the 2011 season as a result of testing positive for a metabolite of boldenone. Jenrry Mejia, formerly of the New York Mets, was suspended in July 2015 when he tested positive for boldenone and stanozolol, and in February 2016 he again tested positive for boldenone; this marked Mejia's third positive test for a performance-enhancing drug, for which he received the first PED-related lifetime ban in MLB history. Abraham Almonte was suspended for 80 games before the 2016 season after testing positive for boldenone. Infielder Domingo Leyba of the Arizona Diamondbacks was suspended for the first 80 games of the 2020 season for testing positive for boldenone. On March 8, 2024, Cincinnati Reds infielder Noelvi Marte was suspended for 80 games after testing positive during spring training. On March 16, 2026, Philadelphia Phillies outfielder Johan Rojas was suspended for 80 games for using Boldenone.
- Mixed martial arts: Stephan Bonnar and Josh Barnett, mixed martial arts (MMA) fighters from the UFC and PRIDE Fighting Championships, have also tested positive for the banned substance. After the World Extreme Cagefighting show on January 20, 2006 Muay Thai turned MMA fighter Kit Cope also tested positive for boldenone. Following the Strikeforce card on June 22, 2007, former PRIDE and UFC fighter Phil Baroni tested positive for boldenone, as well as stanozolol. At a K-1 WGP event in Las Vegas on August 17, 2007, two fighters, Rickard Nordstrand and Zabit Samedov, both tested positive for boldenone. Alexandre Franca Nogueira tested positive for boldenone in July 2008. Antônio Silva tested positive for boldenone after his July 26, 2008 fight against Justin Eilers in the EliteXC promotion. Silva was suspended by the California State Athletic Commission for a year and fined $2500.
- Australian Football League: Justin Charles, a former minor league baseball player with the Florida Marlins, of Richmond FC tested positive for the substance in 1997 and was suspended for 16 matches.
- Major League Soccer: Jon Conway (goal keeper) and Jeff Parke (defender) of the New York Red Bulls both tested positive for the substance in 2008 and were suspended 10 games and fined 10% of their annual income. They are also the first to violate MLS drug policy.
- Horse racing: Leading horse trainer Gai Waterhouse was fined $10,000 after being found guilty on May 15, 2008, of presenting a horse to the races with a prohibited substance in its system. Her horse Perfectly Poised was found to have traces of the banned substance boldenone in its system after finishing second at Canterbury in April 2007.

=== Metandienone ===
- Several successful athletes and professional bodybuilders have admitted long-term metandienone use before the drug was banned, including Arnold Schwarzenegger.

=== Metenolone esters ===
- Barry Bonds allegedly tested positive with metenolone enanthate in 2000 and 2001.
- In February 2009, Sports Illustrated reported that Alex Rodriguez tested positive for two AAS, testosterone and metenolone enanthate, while playing for the Texas Rangers in 2003. He claims to have purchased them over the counter, in the Dominican Republic. However, "boli," as he referred to it, is an illegal substance in the Dominican Republic. In an interview with ESPN two days after the SI revelations, Rodriguez admitted to using banned substances from 2001 to 2003, citing "an enormous amount of pressure to perform," but said he had not since then used banned performance-enhancing substances. He said he did not know the name(s) of the particular substance(s) he was using, and would not specify whether he took them in injectable form.
- Belarusian shot putter Nadzeya Ostapchuk was stripped of her gold medal after testing positive for metenolone at the London 2012 Olympic Games.
- In February 2013, Hedo Türkoğlu of the Orlando Magic was suspended for 20 games without pay by the league after testing positive for metenolone.
- In December 2013, Natalia Volgina was stripped of her 2013 Old Mutual Two Oceans Marathon title and received a two-year competition ban, subsequent to a final guilty verdict for using metenolone.
- The infamous "duchess" cocktail allegedly administered to Russian athletes at the Sochi Winter Olympics consisted of oxandrolone, a metenolone ester, and a trenbolone ester.

=== Nandrolone esters ===
- In November 1994, South Africa's Jamie Bloem was the first rugby league footballer to test positive for nandrolone. He was banned for two years.
- Spain's Pep Guardiola tested positive for nandrolone while playing for Brescia.
- Petr Korda tested positive for nandrolone after his 1998 Wimbledon quarter final match against Tim Henman. Korda was banned from tennis for one year from September 1999.
- Roger Clemens, who was a member of the 2000 World Series winning New York Yankees, was reported to have been injected with nandrolone (Deca-Durabolin) by major league strength coach Brian McNamee during the 2000 baseball season.
- ATP Tennis Pro Guillermo Coria tested positive for nandrolone in 2001, causing him to be suspended for 6 months from the sport
- UFC Hall of Famer Royce Gracie tested positive for nandrolone after defeating his longtime rival Kazushi Sakuraba at K-1 Dynamite!! USA in 2007. He was fined $2,500 and suspended for the remainder of his license.
- Shoaib Akhtar, a Pakistani cricketer, was given a two-year ban in 2006 for testing positive for nandrolone. Shoaib was sent back to Pakistan and missed out competing for the Champions Trophy. The verdict, however, was overturned by a three-man tribunal a month later.
- Sean Sherk, former UFC Lightweight Champion, tested positive for nandrolone following his title defence to Hermes Franca at UFC 73. Franca also tested positive for nandrolone. Sherk passed a lie detector test claiming that he did not knowingly take AAS but the UFC still stripped Sherk of the lightweight title.
- Linford Christie, a British sprinter and 1992 Olympic gold medalist, tested positive for nandrolone in 1999.
- Former Maryland Terrapin and NBA player Juan Dixon tested positive for use of this drug in 2009, which earned him a suspension by the International Basketball Federation.
- In September 2010, Baltimore Orioles minor league shortstop Alfredo Zambrano received a 50-game suspension for the 2011 season as a result of testing positive for metabolites of nandrolone.
- Indian athlete Rani Yadav and Sri Lankan boxer Manju Wanniarachchi tested positive for nandrolone at the 2010 Commonwealth Games.
- British tennis player Greg Rusedski tested positive for nandrolone in January 2004, but was cleared of the charges in a hearing on 10 March 2004.
- In August 2014, New York Mets minor league right handed pitcher Derrick Bernard received a 62-game suspension as a result of testing positive for metabolites of nandrolone.
- In April 2017, Pittsburgh Pirates center fielder Starling Marte received an 80-game suspension for a positive test result of nandrolone.
- In June 2021, Shelby Houlihan, the women's 5k and 1500m American record-holder, received a 4-year ban as the result of a positive test.
- In August 2021, Oakland Athletics outfielder Ramón Laureano received an 80-game suspension after testing positive for nandrolone.

=== Oxandrolone ===
- The infamous "duchess" cocktail allegedly administered to Russian athletes at the 2014 Sochi Winter Olympics consisted of oxandrolone, a metenolone ester, and a trenbolone ester.

=== Stanozolol ===
- Ben Johnson was stripped of his gold medal in the 100 meter sprint at the 1988 Summer Olympics when he tested positive for stanozolol after winning the final.
- Olimpiada Ivanova was stripped of her silver medal in the 10 kilometer walk at the 1997 World Championships in Athletics after she had tested positive for stanozolol, and she was banned for two years.
- Australian National Rugby League footballer Rodney Howe was banned for 22 matches in 1998 for using stanozolol.
- Vita Pavlysh was stripped of her gold medal in shot put at the 1999 IAAF World Indoor Championships after she had tested positive for stanozolol. 5 years later at the 2004 IAAF World Indoor Championships in Budapest, Hungary, she won the title again only to fail the drug test for the same reason. She was again stripped of her title and banned from athletics for life.
- Liudmyla Blonska, a Ukrainian heptathlete, tested positive for traces of stanozolol shortly after finishing thirteenth at the 2002 European Championships in Athletics and in June 2003 was handed a two-year ban, whereafter she returned to the sport. At the 2008 Beijing Games, she was stripped of a silver medal and given a lifetime ban after testing positive for stanozolol again.
- Rafael Palmeiro was suspended 10 days from Major League Baseball on August 1, 2005, after testing positive for steroids. According to the published report in The New York Times, stanozolol was the steroid detected in Palmeiro's system. This came not long after he testified before the United States House Committee on Oversight and Government Reform on steroid usage in baseball, and he denied ever using steroids.
- Barry Bonds is accused of using stanozolol in Game of Shadows, a book by Mark Fainaru-Wada and Lance Williams. The accusations were first aired on 7 March 2006 by Sports Illustrated, which published excerpts from the book.
- Salvador Carmona, footballer, tested positive for stanozolol in 2005 and 2006. He was banned for life by the Court of Arbitration for Sport (CAS) due to repeated drug offences. Tribunal Arbitral du Sport.
- Magnus Hedman, footballer, was charged and convicted by Swedish court in June 2009 when he tested positive for stanozolol. At the time he was an "ambassador" for Swedish anti-steroid organization Ren Idrott ("Clean Sports") and sports commentator for Swedish TV4. He lost both assignments as a consequence.
- Phil Baroni, former UFC and PRIDE Fighting Championship fighter, tested positive for stanozolol following his June 22, 2007 fight against Frank Shamrock at Strikeforce: Judgment Day.
- K-1's 2007 World Grand Prix in Las Vegas finalist Zabit Samedov tested positive for stanozolol following the August 11, 2007 event.
- Roger Clemens was reported to have been injected with stanozolol (Winstrol) by major league strength coach Brian McNamee during the 1998 baseball season.
- 2008 Triple Crown hopeful Big Brown was reported to have been injected with Winstrol, which is legal in some states in US horse racing, by trainer Richard E. Dutrow, Jr.
- Chris Leben, mixed martial artist, tested positive for the substance after UFC 89 where he was defeated by Michael Bisping and was suspended for 9 months.
- Kirill Sidelnikov, mixed martial artist, tested positive for the substance after Affliction: Day of Reckoning where he was defeated by Paul Buentello and was suspended for 1 year and fined $2,500.
- Tim Sylvia, mixed martial artist, tested positive for the drug stanozolol after a Nevada State Athletic Commission test. As a result, Sylvia was stripped of his title, served a 6-month suspension, and was fined $10,000. Sylvia has stated that he used the drug to shed excess body fat and lose weight.
- Cristiane Justino tested positive for AAS and as a result of the banned substance, her fight against Hiroko Yamanaka result has been changed to a "No Contest" while Cristiane has had her license suspended and was fined $2500.
- Hysen Pulaku, an Albanian weightlifter, was expelled from the 2012 Olympics after testing positive for stanozolol.
- Zane Botha, a South African rugby player, was banned from competing in rugby for two years in January 2013 after testing positive for stanozolol.
- David Rollins, Seattle Mariners pitcher, was suspended for 80 games in 2015 after testing positive for stanozolol.
- Ervin Santana, Minnesota Twins pitcher, was suspended for 80 games without pay in 2015 after testing positive for stanozolol.
- Jenrry Mejía, New York Mets pitcher, was suspended for 80 games without pay early in 2015 after testing positive for stanozolol, and another 162 later in the season after a second positive test.
- Sheila Ocasio, Puerto Rican volleyball player, tested positive before the bronze medal match lost 1–3 to by her national team to the Dominican Republic in the 2015 Pan American Games and could not play that game.
- Mauricio Fiol, Peruvian swimmer, tested positive for stanozolol after winning the silver medal in the 200-metre butterfly at the 2015 Pan American Games. He was stripped of his medal and disqualified from competing in the 2016 Olympics by FINA.
- Ilya Ilyin, Kaz weightlifter and world record holder tested positive for stanozolol in 2016 after a reanalysis of his B-sample test from the 2012 London Olympics.
- Pradeep Sangwan, Left-arm Medium pace bowler from Delhi tested positive for stanozolol in the 2013 IPL season while playing for the Kolkata Knight Riders franchise in the IPL. He was banned for 18 months.
- In January 2020, Chilean ATP tennis singles competitor Nicolás Jarry tested positive for both ligandrol and stanozolol. He protested at the time that the multi-vitamins from Brazil were contaminated that he took on the advice of an unnamed doctor.
- Robinson Canó, a New York Mets second baseman, tested positive for stanozolol in November 2020. He was suspended for the 2021 season. This was his second suspension for performance-enhancing drug use.
- On April 30, 2005, James Toney defeated John Ruiz for the World Boxing Association's heavyweight title, but tested positive for stanozolol, resulting in a 90-day suspension and his title being stripped.

=== Trenbolone esters ===
- The infamous "duchess" cocktail allegedly administered to Russian athletes at the Sochi Winter Olympics consisted of oxandrolone, a metenolone ester, and a trenbolone ester.
- 90 year old cyclist Carl Grove tested positive in-competition for the metabolite epitrenbolone at the Masters Track National Championships on July 11, 2018, after setting an age-based world record. Since he had tested negative for prohibited substances during an in-competition test the previous day, the positive result was judged by the United States Anti-Doping Agency more likely than not to have been caused by meat eaten in the evening between the two tests. Grove was disqualified from competitive results obtained on the date his positive sample was collected.
- In January 2026, baseball outfielder Max Kepler was suspended for 80 games by Major League Baseball after testing positive for epitrenbolone.

== Selective androgen receptor modulators ==
=== Enobosarm ===
- In June 2013, professional cyclist Nikita Novikov was provisionally suspended after a possible breach of anti-doping rules, due to a positive A-sample result for enobosarm.
- UFC Fighter Tim Means was pulled from a fight in February 2017 after testing positive for enobosarm in a pre-fight drug screening administered by USADA.
- In June 2015 Azerbaijan's Chaltu Beji tested positive for doping at the 2015 European Games in Baku. The 18-year-old Ethiopian-born Beji tested positive for the banned substance enobosarm in a urine sample with a B sample confirming the result. She won the 3,000-meter steeplechase event despite falling at the last water jump, but was disqualified because of the positive tests.
- In May 2016, Romanian-Canadian professional boxer Lucian Bute, former super middleweight world titleholder, tested positive for enobosarm after his draw against Swedish professional boxer and titleholder Badou Jack on April 30 at the D.C. Armory in Washington, D.C.
- On December 16, 2016, Russian heavyweight boxer Alexandre Povetkin tested positive for enobosarm less than a day before an interim WBC title fight against former WBC champ Bermane Stiverne. The fight, which was scheduled for December 17 in Yekaterinburg, Russia, was cancelled.
- In March 2016, Australian triathlete Lisa Marangon received a 4-year ban ending in March 2020 for use of banned substance enobosarm. American triathlete Ashley Paulson was given a 6-month suspension for use of banned substance enobosarm because officials accepted her contention that the banned drug positive came from a contaminated supplement.
- In February 2017, American triathlete Beth Gerdes was given a 2-year suspension for presence of enobosarm, and American triathlete Lauren Barnett was given a 6-month suspension for the presence of enobosarm. Both triathletes claimed contamination from salt tablet supplements. Lauren Barnett was able to provide tablets and sealed bottle tablets which both tested positive for contamination, thus only the 6-month suspension. The 2-year suspension still stands for Beth Gerdes who provided tablets for testing, but tests showed only low levels of enobosarm not high enough to confirm the finding. .
- In February 2017, UFC light heavyweight Tom Lawlor was suspended for two years following a positive test for enobosarm.
- In June 2019, Major League Baseball pitcher Frankie Montas was suspended 80 games after testing positive for ostarine, another name for enobosarm.
- In July 2019, National Football League player Taylor Lewan failed a drug test for ostarine, which Lewan claims was ingested accidentally as an unlabeled ingredient in a supplement.
- In October 2020, the professional cyclist Matteo Spreafico failed a drug test for ostarine during the 2020 Giro d'Italia, the UCI announced that Spreafico had returned two Adverse Analytical Findings for Enobosarm and was provisionally suspended.
- In October 2021, two Thoroughbred horses named Arafat and Komunist tested positive for ostarine after races at Woodbine Racetrack. In a decision of the Alcohol and Gaming Commission of Ontario issued May 30, 2022, the horses were declared unplaced in the races in question, and their trainer Robert Gerl was fined $100,000 (as well as forfeiting prize money) and suspended from racing for 20 years.

=== Ligandrol ===
In 2015, quarterback of the Florida Gators, Will Grier, allegedly tested positive for Ligandrol, a claim that the University of Florida denies.

In 2017, Joakim Noah was banned for twenty games by the NBA for testing positive for Ligandrol.

In July 2019, tennis player Beatriz Haddad Maia from Brazil received a provisional suspension after she tested positive for selective androgen receptor modulators.

Shayna Jack, an Australian swimmer, was forced to withdraw in July 2019 from the national squad before the world championships in Gwangju, South Korea after she tested positive for Ligandrol.

== Stimulants ==
=== Clenbuterol ===
A three-year suspension for taking clenbuterol kept sprinter Katrin Krabbe from competing in the 1992 Summer Olympics, and effectively ended her athletic career.

In 2006, San Francisco Giants pitcher Guillermo Mota, while a member of the New York Mets, received a 50-game suspension after testing positive for clenbuterol. He had an additional 100-game suspension levied in 2012 after testing positive for the same drug.

American swimmer Jessica Hardy tested positive at the US trials in 2008. She was subject to a one-year suspension, having claimed she unknowingly took the drug in a contaminated food supplement. Former New York Mets clubhouse employee Kirk Radomski admitted in his plea deal to distributing clenbuterol to dozens of current and former Major League Baseball players and associates. After finishing fourth in the K-2 1000-m event at the 2008 Summer Olympics in Beijing, Polish sprint canoer Adam Seroczyński was disqualified for taking this drug, and Chinese cyclist Li Fuyu tested positive for it at the Dwars door Vlaanderen race in Belgium on March 24, 2010.

In 2010, St. Louis Cardinals minor-league shortstop Lainer Bueno received a 50-game suspension for the 2011 season as a result of testing positive for clenbuterol.

Cyclist Alberto Contador of Spain was banned for two years from professional cycling after testing positive for the drug at the 2010 Tour de France. He was later stripped of the 2010 title of the Tour de France and the 2011 title of the Giro d'Italia. CAS found that Contador probably tested positive due to a contaminated food supplement. In 2013, Contador's teammate on the Team Saxo Bank squad, Michael Rogers, tested positive for clenbuterol at the Japan Cup bike race. In April 2014, the Union Cycliste Internationale announced that it accepted Rogers' explanation that the substance had been ingested by him after consuming contaminated meat whilst competing at the 2013 Tour of Beijing, upholding Rogers' disqualification from the Japan Cup, but declining to impose any further sanctions on him.

In 2011, players of the Mexico national football team were found with clenbuterol in their bloodstreams, but were acquitted by WADA after they claimed the clenbuterol came from contaminated food. FIFA has also claimed 109 players from multiple countries who were participating in the Under-17 World Cup in Mexico tested positive for this drug. However, FIFA and the World Anti-Doping Agency declined to prosecute any cases because the weight of evidence pointed to contamination from Mexican meat.

In 2013, Mexican boxer Erik Morales was suspended for two years after testing positive for clenbuterol.

In 2014, Toronto Maple Leafs Forward Carter Ashton was suspended from the NHL for 20 games without pay for violating the NHL/NHL Players' Association Performance Enhancing Substances Program after it was determined that he had ingested clenbuterol. Carter claimed he used an unprescribed asthma inhaler.

In 2014, South Korean swimmer Kim Ji-heun has tested positive for clenbuterol at an out-of-competition test on May 13, 2014. After completion of proceedings by the Korea Anti-Doping Disciplinary Panel, Kim received a two-year suspension, back-dated to the day of his positive test.

In 2014, Czech bodybuilder Petr Soukup received a lifetime ban after a positive test for clenbuterol along with methenolone, mesterolone, methamphetamine, oxandrolone, stanozolol, nandrolone, fluoxymesterone, CDMT ("Oral Turinabol"), and metandienone.

In 2015, Yankees minor-league pitching prospect Moises Cedeno tested positive for clenbuterol and was suspended for 72 games.

In 2015, two players from the Collingwood Football Club in Australia were delisted from the club and accepted two-year bans from all sport in Australia after testing positive to the substance, which they believe may have been in a contaminated illicit drug they consumed.

In 2016, Australian heavyweight boxing champion Lucas Browne tested positive for clenbuterol.

In 2016, Raul A. Mondesi tested positive for clenbuterol and was suspended 50 games from the Northwest Arkansas Naturals. MLB and the MLBPA agreed to reduce the suspension from 80 games to 50 games after Mondesi claimed it was found in cold medicine.

In 2016, the California State Athletic Commission decided to issue Francisco Vargas a temporary boxing license on a probationary basis after he tested positive for clenbuterol.

In 2018, British Olympic sprinter Nigel Levine was provisionally suspended for failing a drug test.

In March 2018, champion boxer Canelo Alvarez tested positive for clenbuterol on two consecutive urine tests in February 2018. This violation led to the cancellation of a heavily anticipated rematch between Alvarez and Gennady Golovkin, which was to be held on May 5, 2018.

== See also ==
- List of doping cases in sport
- Doping at the Asian Games
- Doping at the Olympics
