= Predrag Filipović (race walker) =

Serbian race walker

Personal information
- Born: 5 October 1978 (age 47) Leskovac, SFR Yugoslavia
- Height: 1.82 m (6 ft 0 in)
- Weight: 73 kg (161 lb)

Sport
- Country: Serbia
- Sport: Athletics
- Event: Race walking
- Club: AK Vlasotince
- Coached by: Tomislav Stefanović

Achievements and titles
- Personal best(s): 10 km – 40:47.12 (2010); 20 km – 1:21:50 (2003); 50 km – 3:57:22 (2010)

Predrag Filipović (Serbian Cyrillic: Предраг Филиповић; born 5 October 1978) is a Serbian race walker. He competed for Serbia and Montenegro at the 2004 Summer Olympics and finished 39th in the 20 kilometre walk with a time of 1:31:35. He represented Serbia at the 2008, 2012 and 2016 Olympics, and placed 41st and 48th in the 20 km walk in 2008 and 2012, respectively. In 2016, he finished 50th in the 50 km walk. His twin brother Nenad competed alongside at the 2008, 2012 and 2016 Olympics.

== Achievements ==
Year	Competition	Venue	Position	Event	Notes
Representing Serbia and Montenegro (Yugoslavia)
2000	European Race Walking Cup	Eisenhüttenstadt, Germany	34th of 59	20 km	1:26:04
2002	European Championships	Munich, Germany	—	20 km	DQ
2002	World Race Walking Cup	Turin, Italy	54th of 87	20 km	1:32:41
2003	World Championships	Paris, France	22nd of 29	20 km	1:25:15
2004	World Race Walking Cup (U20)	Naumburg, Germany	—	20 km	DNF
2004	Olympic Games	Athens, Greece	39th of 41	20 km	1:31:35
Representing Serbia
2007	World Championships	Osaka, Japan	32nd of 32	20 km	1:35:51
2008	World Race Walking Cup	Cheboksary, Russia	38th of 100	20 km	1:24:07
2008	Olympic Games	Beijing, China	41st of 49	20 km	1:28:15
2009	World Championships	Berlin, Germany	35th of 45	20 km	1:27:44
2010	European Championships	Barcelona, Spain	15th of 15	50 km	4:06:29
2011	European Race Walking Cup	Olhão, Portugal	15th of 28	50 km	4:07:54
2012	World Race Walking Cup	Saransk, Russia	65th of 104	20 km	1:27:56
2012	Olympic Games	London, United Kingdom	48th of 48	20 km	1:27:22
2013	World Championships	Moscow, Russia	—	50 km	DNF
2016	Olympic Games	Rio de Janeiro, Brazil	49th of 49	50 km	4:39:48

== See also ==
- Serbian records in athletics
