= Olga Panfyorova =

Russian racewalker

Olga Panfyorova (born August 21, 1977) is a female race walker from Russia. She set the world's best year performance in the women's 10 km walk in 1998, clocking 42:01.00 in Izhevsk, Russia.

== International competitions ==
Representing Russia
Year	Competition	Venue	Position	Event	Result	Notes
1995	European Junior Championships	Nyíregyháza, Hungary	2nd	5000 m	22:24.95	
1996	World Junior Championships	Sydney, Australia	2nd	5,000 m	21:52.27	
1997	World Race Walking Cup	Poděbrady, Czech Republic	15th	10 km	43:08	
1997	European U23 Championships	Turku, Finland	1st	10 km	43:33	
1997	World Championships	Athens, Greece	—	10 km	DQ	Lifting
1998	European Championships	Budapest, Hungary	22nd	10 km	47:20	
