= Pedro Martins (race walker) =

Portuguese racewalker

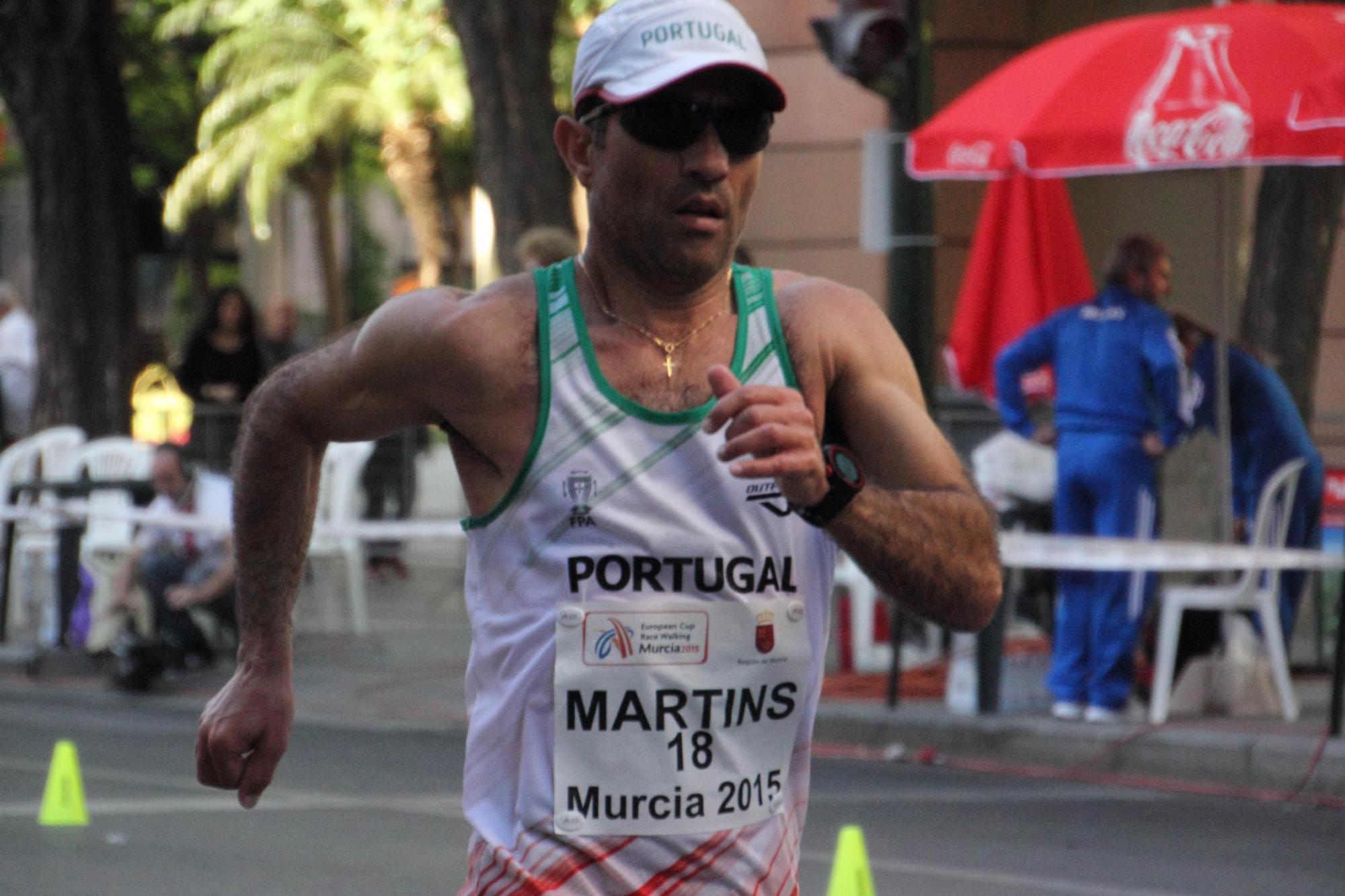
- Martins at the 2015 European Cup Race Walking

Personal information
- Full name: Pedro Martins
- Born: January 12, 1968 (age 58)

Sport
- Country: Portugal
- Sport: Athletics
- Events: 20 km, 50 km race walk

Pedro Martins (born 12 January 1968) is a Portuguese race walker.

== Achievements ==
Year	Competition	Venue	Position	Event	Notes
Representing Portugal
1997	World Race Walking Cup	Poděbrady, Czech Republic	84th	20 km	1:27:51
1999	World Race Walking Cup	Mézidon-Canon, France	41st	50 km	3:56:25
1999	World Championships	Seville, Spain	21st	50 km	4:06:31
2000	European Race Walking Cup	Eisenhüttenstadt, Germany	23rd	50 km	4:03:28
2000	Olympic Games	Sydney, Australia	33rd	50 km	4:08:13
2001	European Race Walking Cup	Dudince, Slovakia	17th	50 km	3:56:25
2001	World Championships	Edmonton, Canada	—	50 km	DSQ
2002	European Championships	Munich, Germany	16th	50 km	4:03:39
2002	World Race Walking Cup	Turin, Italy	32nd	50 km	4:08:13
2003	World Championships	Paris, France	17th	50 km	3:58:10
2004	World Race Walking Cup	Naumburg, Germany	12th	50 km	3:55:29
2004	Olympic Games	Athens, Greece	—	50 km	DNF
2005	World Championships	Helsinki, Finland	20th	50 km	4:08:12
2006	World Race Walking Cup	A Coruña, Spain	21st	50 km	3:58:10
2006	European Championships	Gothenburg, Sweden	—	50 km	DNF
2008	World Race Walking Cup	Cheboksary, Russia	40th	50 km	4:05:17
2009	European Race Walking Cup	Metz, France	—	50 km	DNF
2011	European Race Walking Cup	Olhão, Portugal	—	50 km	DNF
2012	World Race Walking Cup	Saransk, Russia	—	50 km	DNF
2013	European Race Walking Cup	Dudince, Slovakia	24th	50 km	4:12:37
2015	European Race Walking Cup	Murcia, Spain	—	50 km	DNF
