= 1994 World Junior Championships in Athletics – Women's 5000 metres walk =

Women's 5000 metres walk

The women's 5000 metres walk event at the 1994 World Junior Championships in Athletics was held in Lisbon, Portugal, at Estádio Universitário de Lisboa on 23 July.

== Medalists ==
Gold	Irina Stankina; Russia
Silver	Susana Feitor; Portugal
Bronze	Natalya Trofimova; Russia

== Results ==
=== Final ===
23 July

Rank	Name	Nationality	Time	Notes
1st place, gold medalist(s)	Irina Stankina	Russia	21:05.41	
2nd place, silver medalist(s)	Susana Feitor	Portugal	21:12.87	
3rd place, bronze medalist(s)	Natalya Trofimova	Russia	21:24.71	
4	María Vasco	Spain	21:41.47	
5	Song Lijuan	China	22:03.69	
6	Yuka Kamioka	Japan	22:06.47	
7	Eva Pérez	Spain	22:23.31	
8	Liu Hongyu	China	22:23.69	
9	Mónika Pesti	Hungary	22:24.79	
10	Sofia Avoila	Portugal	22:48.00	
11	Natalie Saville	Australia	22:48.42	
12	Jana Weidemann	Germany	22:49.04	
13	Veronica Budileanu	Romania	22:58.54	
14	Linda Coffee	Australia	22:59.20	
15	Anya-Marie Ruoss	United States	23:00.78	
16	Dana Pinkert	Germany	23:28.84	
17	Nohora Paque	Colombia	23:47.24	
18	Maribel Rebollo	Mexico	23:52.93	
19	Magali Thierry	France	23:54.85	
20	Geovana Irusta	Bolivia	24:01.68	
21	Viera Loskarova	Slovakia	24:07.07	
22	Gillian O'Sullivan	Ireland	24:19.38	
23	Jessica Franzén	Sweden	24:21.58	
24	Iulia Kotlier	Israel	24:25.44	
25	Nagwa Ibrahim	Egypt	24:53.02	
26	Deb Iden	United States	24:58.07	
27	Yakobe Amsale	Ethiopia	26:45.99	
	Miki Itakura	Japan	DQ	IAAF rule 191

== Participation ==
According to an unofficial count, 28 athletes from 20 countries participated in the event.

- Australia (2)
- Bolivia (1)
- China (2)
- Colombia (1)
- Egypt (1)
- Ethiopia (1)
- France (1)
- Germany (2)
- Hungary (1)
- Ireland (1)
- Israel (1)
- Japan (2)
- Mexico (1)
- Portugal (2)
- Romania (1)
- Russia (2)
- Slovakia (1)
- Spain (2)
- Sweden (1)
- United States (2)
