= Vladimir Andreyev (race walker) =

Russian race walker (1966–2024)

Vladimir Vasilyevich Andreyev (Russian: Владимир Васильевич Андреев; 7 September 1966 – 16 April 2024) was a Russian race walker. He died on 16 April 2024, at the age of 57.

== Achievements ==
Year	Competition	Venue	Position	Notes
Representing Unified Team
1992	Olympic Games	Barcelona, Spain	13th	20 km
Representing Russia
1993	World Race Walking Cup	Monterrey, Mexico	11th	20 km
1993	World Championships	Stuttgart, Germany	19th	20 km
1997	World Race Walking Cup	Poděbrady, Czech Republic	10th	20 km
1999	World Race Walking Cup	Mézidon-Canon, France	3rd	20 km
1999	World Championships	Seville, Spain	DNF	20 km
2000	Olympic Games	Sydney, Australia	3rd	20 km
2001	European Race Walking Cup	Dudince, Slovakia	5th	20 km
2001	World Championships	Edmonton, Canada	DSQ	20 km
2002	European Championships	Munich, Germany	2nd	20 km
2002	World Race Walking Cup	Turin, Italy	2nd	20 km
2003	European Race Walking Cup	Cheboksary, Russia	3rd	20 km
2003	World Championships	Paris, France	DSQ	20 km
2004	Olympic Games	Athens, Greece	7th	20 km

== See also ==
- List of doping cases in athletics
