= Nikolay Matyukhin =

Russian race walker

Nikolay Ivanovich Matyukhin (Russian: Николай Иванович Матюхин; born December 13, 1968, in Zhukovsky) is a Russian race walker. He is married to the sprinter Tatyana Chebykina.

== International competitions ==
Representing Russia
Year	Competition	Venue	Position	Notes
1995	World Race Walking Cup	Beijing, China	17th	50 km
1995	World Championships	Gothenburg, Sweden	10th	50 km
1996	Olympic Games	Atlanta, United States	25th	50 km
1997	World Championships	Athens, Greece	15th	50 km
1997	IAAF World Race Walking Cup	Poděbrady, Czech Republic	4th	50 km
1998	European Championships	Budapest, Hungary	16th	50 km
1999	World Championships	Seville, Spain	2nd	50 km
1999	IAAF World Race Walking Cup	Mézidon-Canon, France	3rd	50 km
2000	Olympic Games	Sydney, Australia	5th	50 km
2001	European Race Walking Cup	Dudince, Slovakia	2nd	50 km
2001	World Championships	Edmonton, Canada	DSQ	50 km
2002	IAAF World Race Walking Cup	Turin, Italy	4th	50 km
