= Tomasz Lipiec =

Polish racewalker and politician

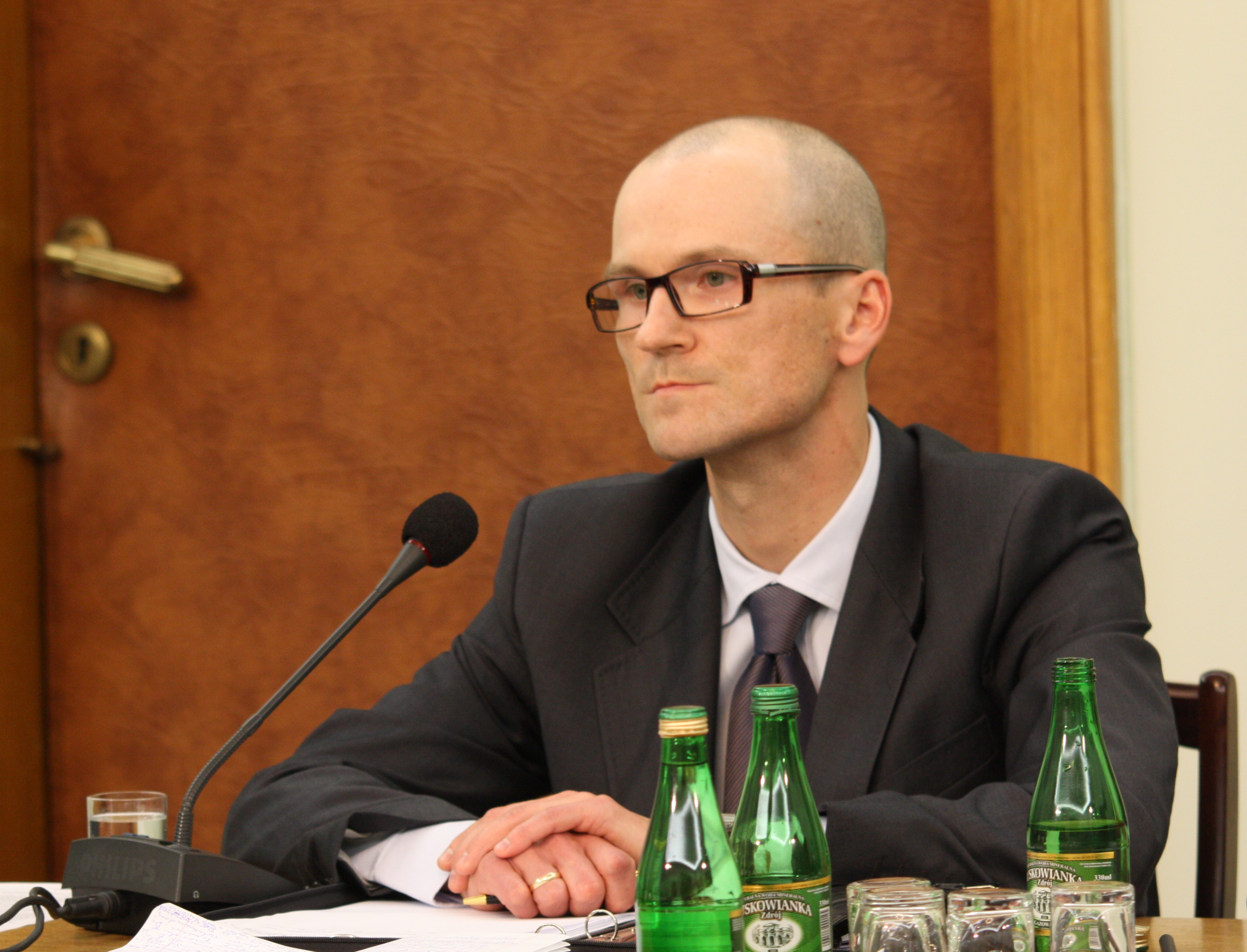
Tomasz Lipiec

Tomasz Wojciech Lipiec (born 10 May 1971 in Warsaw) is a retired Polish race walker and former Polish Minister for Sport in the government of Jarosław Kaczyński.

In 1993, Lipiec has been banned for four years from professional competing in athletics due to the allegations of doping use. He was acquitted by the Polish Athletic Association after three years.

He was arrested and charged with corruption in 2008 and was convicted and sentenced 3 and a half years in prison in 2012. He was also banned from being elected to public office for ten years. He was accused of taking 270,000zł in bribes.

== Achievements ==
| Year | Competition | Venue | Position | Notes |
Representing Poland
| 1993 | World Race Walking Cup | Monterrey, Mexico | 13th | 50 km |
| 1993 | World Championships | Stuttgart, Germany | DNS | 50 km |
| 1997 | World Championships | Athens, Greece | 5th | 50 km |
| 1997 | IAAF World Race Walking Cup | Poděbrady, Czech Republic | 5th | 20 km |
| 1998 | European Race Walking Cup | Dudince, Slovakia | 1st | 50 km |
| 1998 | European Championships | Budapest, Hungary | 5th | 50 km |
| 1999 | IAAF World Race Walking Cup | Mézidon-Canon, France | 2nd | 50 km |
| 1999 | World Championships | Seville, Spain | DSQ | 50 km |
| 2000 | European Race Walking Cup | Eisenhüttenstadt, Germany | 7th | 20 km |
| 2000 | Olympic Games | Sydney, Australia | DNF | 50 km |
| 2001 | World Championships | Edmonton, Canada | 9th | 50 km |
| 2002 | IAAF World Race Walking Cup | Turin, Italy | 3rd | 50 km |
| 2002 | European Championships | Munich, Germany | DSQ | 50 km |
| 2003 | World Championships | Saint-Denis, France | DSQ | 50 km |
