= Barbara Szemán-Tóth =

Hungarian footballer

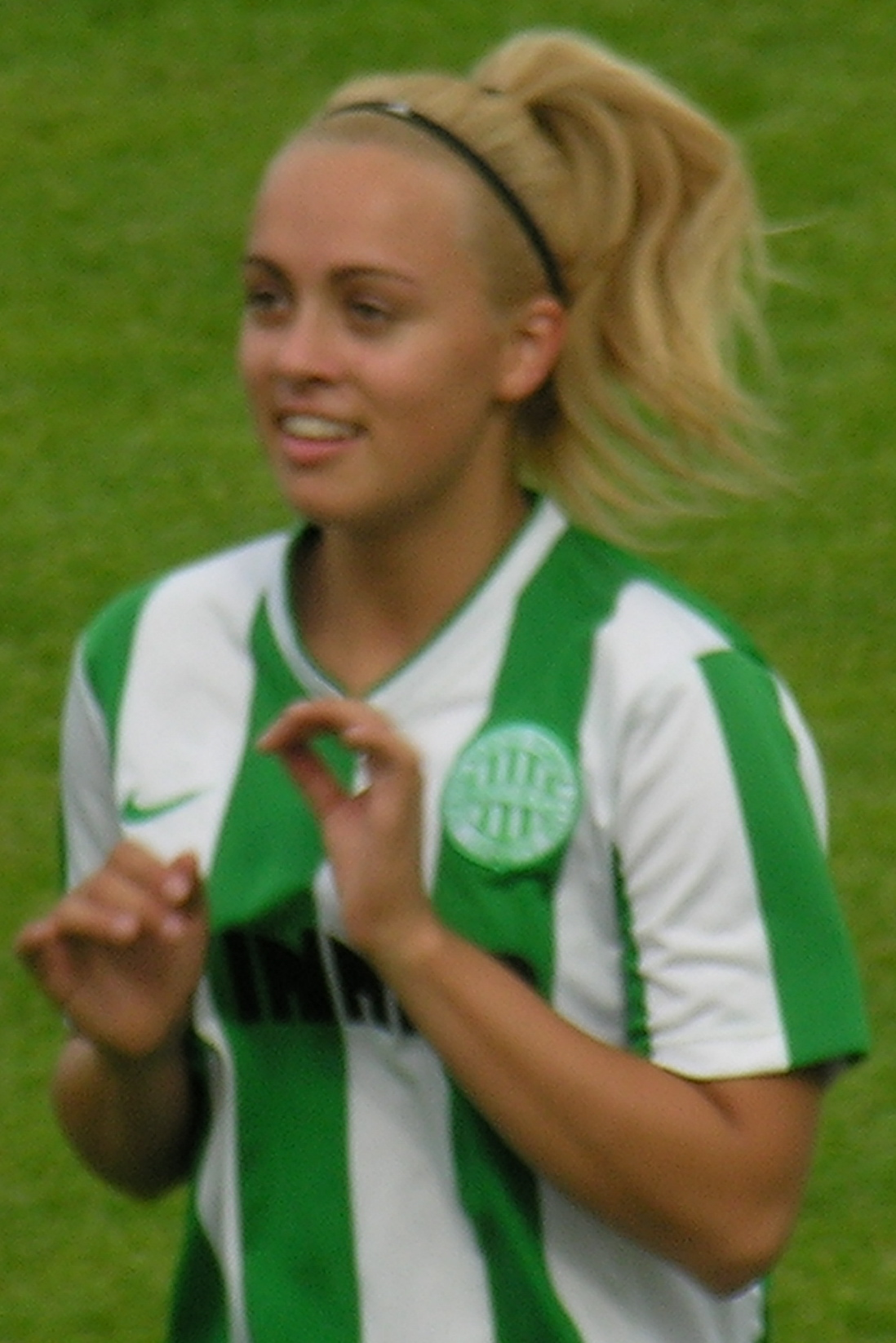
- Barbara Szemán-Tóth in 2011

Personal information
- Date of birth: 11 February 1993 (age 33)
- Position: Defender

Team information
- Current team: MTK

Senior career*
Years	Team	Apps	(Gls)
2016–	MTK	57	(8)

International career^{‡}
2012	Hungary U-19	2	(1)
2019–	Hungary	7	(0)
- * Club domestic league appearances and goals as of 09:00, 20 July 2021 (UTC) ‡ National team caps and goals as of 16:20, 30 January 2021 (UTC)

Barbara Szemán-Tóth (born 11 February 1993) is a Hungarian footballer who plays as a defender for MTK and the Hungary women's national team.

== Career ==
Szemán-Tóth is a member of the Hungary senior national team. She made her debut for the team on 1 March 2019 against Italy, coming on as a substitute for Alexandra Tóth.

== Personal life ==
She is married to Lajos Szemán, who is also a footballer. Their wedding had to be postponed due to both Szemán and Tóth picking up injuries while playing football on the same weekend.
