= Jolanta Dukure =

Latvian race walker

- Born: September 20, 1979 (age 46); Riga, Latvian SSR, Soviet Union

Jolanta Dukure (born 20 September 1979) is a Latvian race walker. She is the Latvian record holder in 5000 m on track and 5 km, 10 km, 20 km, 30 km and 50 km on road.

== Achievements ==
Year	Competition	Venue	Position	Event	Notes
Representing Latvia
1998	World Junior Championships	Annecy, France	2nd	5000 m	21:17.89
1999	European U23 Championships	Gothenburg, Sweden	—	20 km	DQ
1999	World Championships	Seville, Spain	29th	20 km	1:38:34
2000	European Race Walking Cup	Eisenhüttenstadt, Germany	—	20 km	DNF
2000	Olympic Games	Sydney, Australia	30th	20 km	1:36:54
2001	European Race Walking Cup	Dudince, Slovakia	13th	20 km	1:32:11
2001	European U23 Championships	Amsterdam, Netherlands	8th	20 km	1:34:26
2002	European Championships	Munich, Germany	—	20 km	DNF
2005	World Championships	Helsinki, Finland	22nd	20 km	1:34:24
2006	European Championships	Gothenburg, Sweden	9th	20 km	1:31:02
2006	World Race Walking Cup	A Coruña, Spain	17th	20 km	1:32:01
2008	Olympic Games	Beijing, China	41st	20 km	1:41:03
