= Melanie Seeger =

German racewalker

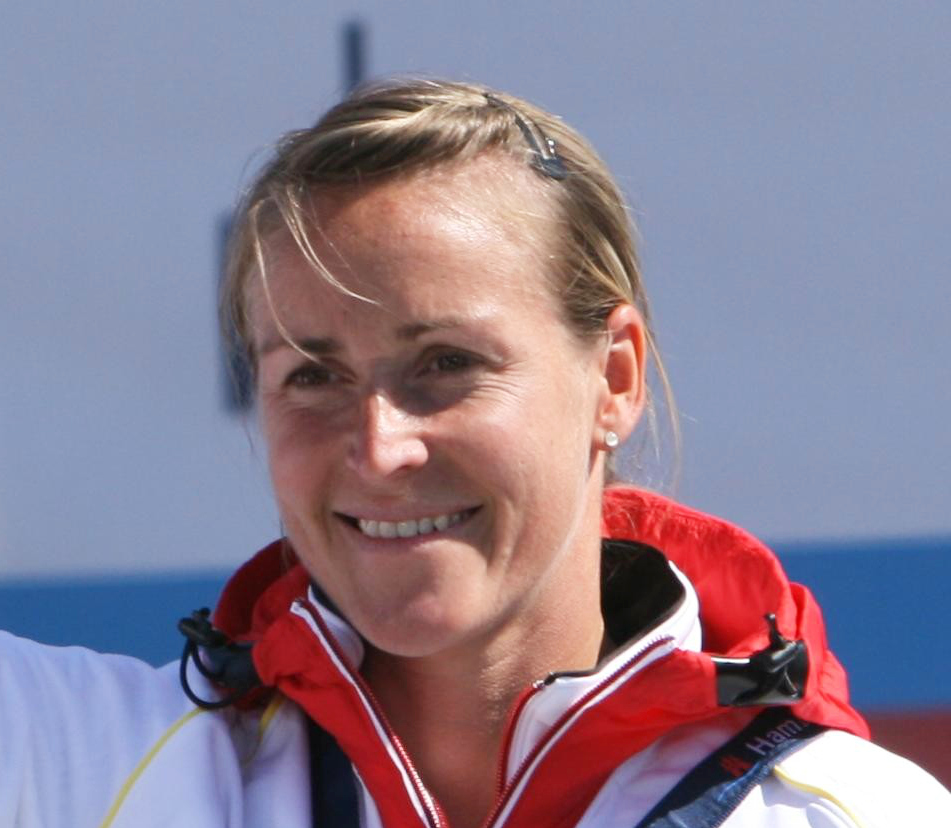

Personal information
- Born: 8 January 1977 (age 49) Brandenburg an der Havel, East Germany
- Height: 1.69 m (5 ft 6 1/2 in)
- Weight: 56 kg (123 lb)

Sport
- Country: Germany
- Sport: Athletics
- Event: 20km Race Walk

Melanie Seeger (born 8 January 1977) is a German race walker. She has represented Germany at the Summer Olympics on three occasions (2004, 2008 and 2012). She has also competed at the IAAF World Championships in Athletics on four occasions and walked at four consecutive editions of the European Athletics Championships.

She holds the German record for the indoor 3000 m walk.

She took time away from athletics in 2009 to give birth to her first child, Helena. She returned to competition in 2010 and she had the best championship performance of her career at the 2010 European Athletics Championships, finishing fourth in the 20 kilometres race walk behind a Russian sweep of medalists.

== Achievements ==
Year	Competition	Venue	Position	Event	Notes
Representing Germany
1996	World Junior Championships	Sydney, Australia	4th	5000 m	22:11.29
1997	World Race Walking Cup	Poděbrady, Czech Republic	54th	10 km	46:49
1997	European U23 Championships	Turku, Finland	8th	10 km	46:34
1998	European Championships	Budapest, Hungary	—	10 km	DNF
1999	World Race Walking Cup	Mézidon-Canon, France	42nd	20 km	1:36:33
1999	European U23 Championships	Gothenburg, Sweden	3rd	20 km	1:34:17
1999	World Championships	Seville, Spain	33rd	20 km	1:40:51
2000	European Race Walking Cup	Eisenhüttenstadt, Germany	34th	20 km	1:35:26
2001	European Race Walking Cup	Dudince, Slovakia	15th	20 km	1:32:57
2001	World Championships	Edmonton, Canada	7th	20 km	1:30:41
2002	European Championships	Munich, Germany	14th	20 km	1:33:40
2002	World Race Walking Cup	Turin, Italy	25th	20 km	1:35:37
2003	World Championships	Paris, France	8th	20 km	1:29:44
2004	Olympic Games	Athens, Greece	5th	20 km	1:29:52
2004	World Race Walking Cup	Naumburg, Germany	9th	20 km	1:28:17
2005	World Championships	Helsinki, Finland	11th	20 km	1:31:00
2006	World Race Walking Cup	A Coruña, Spain	21st	20 km	1:32:36
2006	European Championships	Gothenburg, Sweden	10th	20 km	1:31:29
2007	World Championships	Osaka, Japan	14th	20 km	1:35:30
2008	World Race Walking Cup	Cheboksary, Russia	15th	20 km	1:31:09
2008	Olympic Games	Beijing, China	22nd	20 km	1:31:56
2010	European Championships	Barcelona, Spain	3rd	20 km	1:29:43
2011	European Race Walking Cup	Olhão, Portugal	6th	20 km	1:32:14
2011	World Championships	Daegu, South Korea	—	20 km	DNF
2012	World Race Walking Cup	Saransk, Russia	19th	20 km	1:33:24
2012	Olympic Games	London, United Kingdom	19th	20 km	1:30:44
