= Olimpiada Ivanova =

Russian race walker

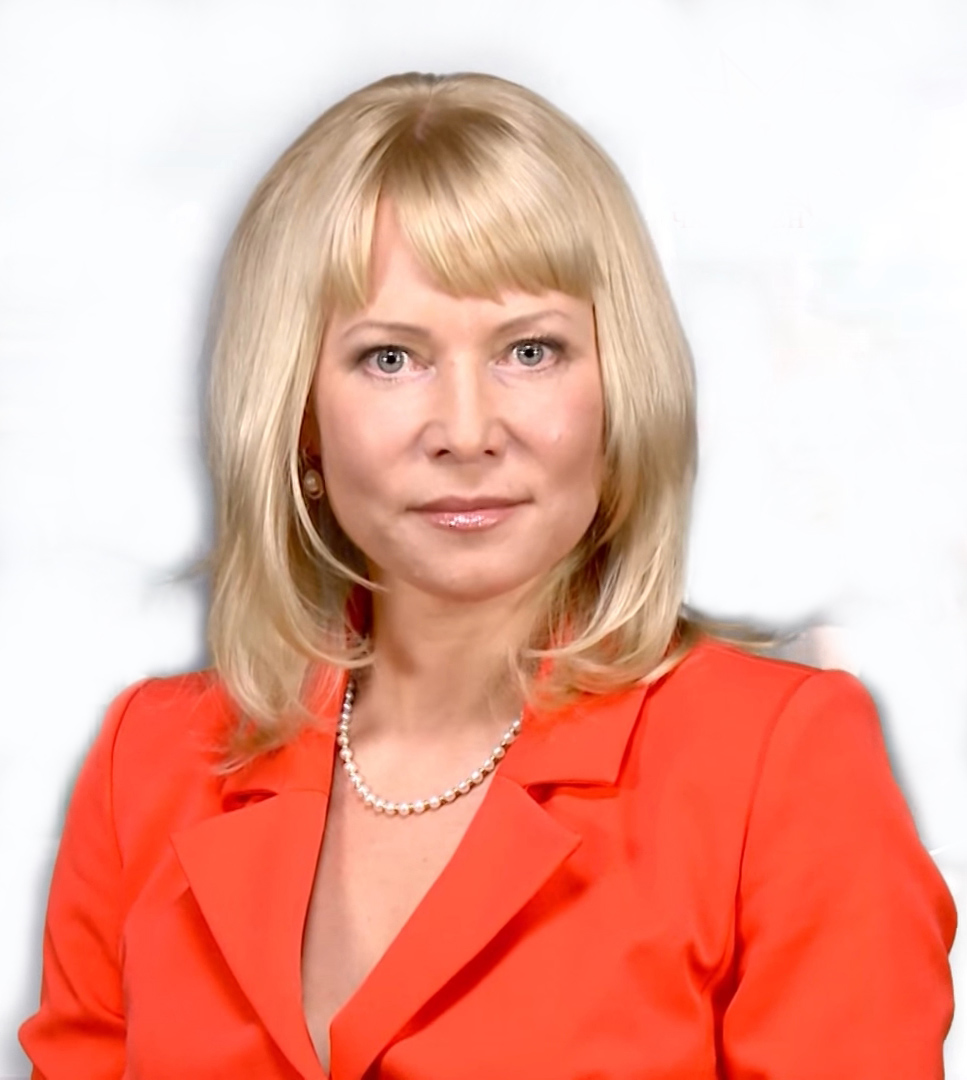
- Ivanova in 2015

Personal information
- Full name: Olimpiada Vladimirovna Ivanova
- National team: Russia
- Born: 26 August 1970 (age 56) Munsyut (Munsiut), Tsivilsky District, Chuvashia, Soviet Union (now Russia)

Sport
- Sport: Women's athletics
- Event: Race walking
- Coached by: Viktor Chegin
Medal record
Olympic Games
Silver medal – second place	2004 Athens	20 km walk
World Championships
Gold medal – first place	2001 Edmonton	20 km walk
Gold medal – first place	2005 Helsinki	20 km walk
World Race Walking Cup
Silver medal – second place	1997 Poděbrady	10 km walk
Silver medal – second place	2002 Turin	20 km walk
Silver medal – second place	2006 La Coruña	20 km walk

Olimpiada Vladimirovna Ivanova (Russian: Олимпиада Владимировна Иванова; born 26 August 1970) is a Russian race walker.

Her first gold medal was won in the 2001 Edmonton World Championships, where she beat the rest of the world with the time 1.27:48. A year later, in 2002, she won another gold medal at the 2002 European Championship in Munich.

The next major sporting event she took part in was the 2004 Athens Olympics where she finished second. The winner was the home hero Athanasia Tsoumeleka, who deeply moved the ecstatic Greek crowd by getting her country's first ever medal in the event (time 1:29:12). Ivanova finished four seconds later and could not hide her disappointment. She did, however, win the gold for the 20 km walk in the 2005 Helsinki World Championships, beating the world record. For this record she was added to the 2007 Guinness World Record.

Ivanova was stripped of her silver medal in the 10 kilometer walk at the 1997 World Championships in Athletics after she had tested positive for stanozolol, and she was banned for two years. She is part of a group of over a dozen elite Russian race walkers, all coached by Viktor Chegin to receive doping bans.

Olimpiada Ivanova is married and has a daughter.

== International competitions ==
Year	Competition	Venue	Position	Event	Result	Notes
Representing the Soviet Union
1986	World Junior Championships	Athens, Greece	15th	5000 m	25:01.87	
Representing Russia
1993	World Race Walking Cup	Monterrey, Mexico	12th	10 km	47:02	
1997	World Race Walking Cup	Poděbrady, Czech Republic	2nd	10 km	41:59	
1997	World Championships	Athens, Greece	~~2nd~~	10 km	DQ	Doping
2000	European Race Walking Cup	Eisenhüttenstadt, Germany	1st	20 km	1:26:48	
2001	European Race Walking Cup	Dudince, Slovakia	1st	20 km	1:26:48	
2001	World Championships	Edmonton, Canada	1st	20 km	1:27:48	
2002	European Championships	Munich, Germany	1st	20 km	1:26:42	
2003	World Championships	Paris, France	—	20 km	DNF	
2004	Olympic Games	Athens, Greece	2nd	20 km	1:29:16	
2005	European Race Walking Cup	Miskolc, Hungary	1st	20 km	1:28:18	
2005	World Championships	Helsinki, Finland	1st	20 km	1:25:41	
2006	World Race Walking Cup	A Coruña, Spain	2nd	20 km	1:27:26	
2007	World Championships	Osaka, Japan	—	20 km	DNF	

== See also ==
- List of doping cases in athletics
- List of Olympic medalists in athletics (women)
- List of World Athletics Championships medalists (women)
- List of 2004 Summer Olympics medal winners
- List of European Athletics Championships medalists (women)
- List of doping cases in sport by substance
- List of Chuvashes
- Russia at the World Athletics Championships
- Doping at the World Athletics Championships

Records
Preceded by Wang Yan	Women's 20 km Walk World Record Holder; 7 August 2005 – 26 February 2011	Succeeded by Vera Sokolova
