= Gillian O'Sullivan =

Irish race walker

Personal information
- Nationality: Irish
- Born: 21 August 1976 (age 50) Killarney, Ireland

Sport
- Sport: Athletics
- Event: race walking
Medal record
Representing Ireland
World Championships
Silver medal – second place	2003 Paris	20km walk

Gillian O'Sullivan (born 21 August 1976) is an Irish race walker. She set the unofficial world record in the 5000m walk in Belfast, United Kingdom since 2002 however, the IAAF have refused to verify it. She won a silver medal at the world championship in 2003 over 20km. It was the first time since 1995 that an Irish athlete had won a World Championship medal. Six years later in Berlin at the World Championships Olive Loughnane won silver at the same event as O'Sullivan.

O'Sullivan the British AAA Championships title in the 5,000m walk event at the 1998 AAA Championships.

O'Sullivan was also the first Irish athlete to win a medal in the walk at an Athletics Championship. O'Sullivan was one of the main contenders for Ireland to win a medal in the Olympics in Athens in 2004 in the 20 km walk but suffered an injury just before the games that prevented her from taking part. O'Sullivan retired on 19 April 2007 after years of injuries.

She now works as a personal trainer and runs a series of health, fitness and motivation talks in Cork.

== Achievements ==
Year	Competition	Venue	Position	Event	Notes
Representing Ireland
1994	World Junior Championships	Lisbon, Portugal	22nd	5000m	24:19.38
1997	European U23 Championships	Turku, Finland	9th	10 km	50:19
1998	European Championships	Budapest, Hungary	23rd	10 km	48:24
1999	World Race Walking Cup	Mézidon-Canon, France	72nd	20 km	1:42:20
1999	World Championships	Seville, Spain	32nd	20 km	1:40:33
2000	European Race Walking Cup	Eisenhüttenstadt, Germany	14th	20 km	1:31:31
2000	Olympic Games	Sydney, Australia	10th	20 km	1:33:10
2001	European Race Walking Cup	Dudince, Slovakia	9th	20 km	1:31:13
2001	World Championships	Edmonton, Canada	—	20 km	DSQ
2002	European Championships	Munich, Germany	4th	20 km	1:28:46
2003	World Championships	Paris, France	2nd	20 km	1:27:34
2004	World Race Walking Cup	Naumburg, Germany	8th	20 km	1:28:01

She attended Lissivigeen N.S
