= Elena Ginko =

Belarusian race walker

Elena Valeryevna Ginko (Belarusian: Алена Гінько, Russian: Елена Валерьевна Гинько; born 30 July 1976) is a Belarusian race walker. She was born in Gomel.

== Achievements ==
Year	Competition	Venue	Position	Event	Notes
Representing Belarus
2001	European Race Walking Cup	Dudince, Slovakia	17th	20 km	1:33:21
2002	European Championships	Munich, Germany	—	20 km	DSQ
2004	Olympic Games	Athens, Greece	9th	20 km	
2005	World Championships	Helsinki, Finland	13th	20 km	
2006	World Race Walking Cup	A Coruña, Spain	8th	20 km	
2006	European Championships	Gothenburg, Sweden	—	20 km	DSQ
2007	European Race Walking Cup	Leamington Spa, Great Britain	3rd	20 km	
2007	World Championships	Osaka, Japan	16th	20 km	
2008	World Race Walking Cup	Cheboksary, Russia	9th	20 km	
2008	Olympic Games	Beijing, PR China	—	20 km	DSQ
