= Margarita Nazarova (race walker) =

Russian race walker (born 1976)

Margarita Nazarova (Russian: Маргарита Назарова; born March 23, 1976) is a retired female race walker from Russia. She set her personal best (1:28:24) in the women's 20 km road race walk on May 25, 2002 in Cheboksary. While she only finished sixth in that race, the time ranked her number 7 in the world for that year.
