= Francesco Galdenzi =

Italian racewalker

Personal information
- Nationality: Italian
- Born: 16 December 1976 (age 49)

Sport
- Sport: Race walking

Francesco Galdenzi (born 16 December 1976) is a retired Italian race walker.

== Achievements ==
Year	Competition	Venue	Position	Notes
Representing Italy
1999	World Race Walking Cup	Mézidon-Canon, France	20th	20 km
2000	European Race Walking Cup	Eisenhüttenstadt, Germany	9th	50 km
2001	European Race Walking Cup	Dudince, Slovakia	13th	50 km
2001	World Championships	Edmonton, Canada	13th	50 km
2002	European Championships	Munich, Germany	8th	50 km
