= Roman Magdziarczyk =

Polish racewalker

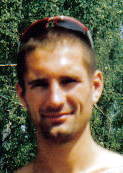
Roman Magdziarczyk

Roman Magdziarczyk (born 5 July 1977 in Wałbrzych) is a Polish race walker.

== Achievements ==
Year	Competition	Venue	Position	Event	Notes
Representing Poland
1997	European U23 Championships	Turku, Finland	13th	20 km	1:27:36
1999	World Championships	Seville, Spain	19th	50 km	4:05:10
2000	Olympic Games	Sydney, Australia	8th	50 km	3:48:17
2001	European Race Walking Cup	Dudince, Slovakia	23rd	20 km	1:25:08
2001	World Championships	Edmonton, Canada	–	50 km	DQ
2002	World Race Walking Cup	Turin, Italy	12th	50 km	3:55:26
2002	European Championships	Munich, Germany	14th	20 km	1:22:57
2003	World Championships	Paris, France	7th	50 km	3:44:53 (PB)
2004	Olympic Games	Athens, Greece	6th	50 km	3:48:11
2005	World Championships	Helsinki, Finland	7th	50 km	3:49:55
2006	World Race Walking Cup	A Coruña, Spain	5th	50 km	3:45:47
2006	European Championships	Gothenburg, Sweden	6th	50 km	3:47:37
