= Marco Giungi =

Italian race walker (born 1974)

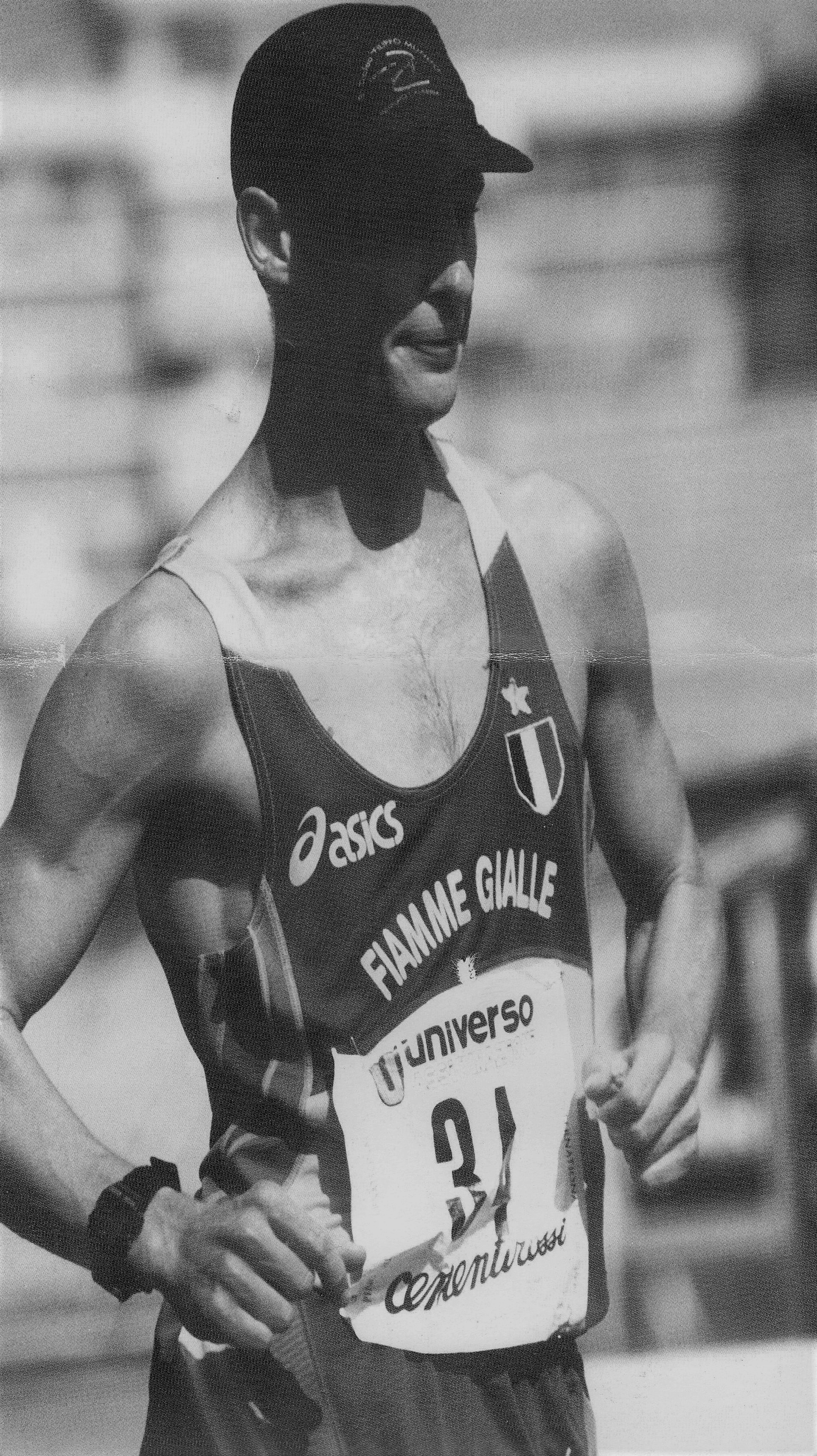
- Marco Giungi

Personal information
- Nationality: Italy
- Born: 30 October 1974 (age 51) Espoo, Finland

Sport
- Sport: Athletics
- Event: Racewalking

Achievements and titles
- Personal best: 1:19:42 (2002)

Marco Giungi (born 30 October 1974) is an Italian race walker who competed at the 2004 Summer Olympics.

== Achievements ==
Year	Competition	Venue	Position	Notes
Representing Italy
1997	World Championships	Athens, Greece	23rd	20 km
2001	World Championships	Edmonton, Canada	8th	50 km
2002	World Race Walking Cup	Turin, Italy	15th	20 km
2002	European Championships	Munich, Germany	DNF	50 km
2003	World Championships	Paris, France	DSQ	50 km
2004	Olympic Games	Athens, Greece	13th	20 km
2004	World Race Walking Cup	Naumburg, Germany	16th	20 km

== See also ==
- Italian all-time lists - 20 km walk
- Italian all-time lists - 50 km walk
