= Augusto Cardoso =

Portuguese race walker

Personal information
- Full name: Augusto Manuel Ferreira; Cardoso Pereira
- Nationality: Portugal
- Born: 13 December 1972 (age 53) Paranhos, Grande Porto, Portugal
- Height: 1.72 m (5 ft 7 1/2 in)
- Weight: 65 kg (143 lb)

Sport
- Sport: Athletics
- Event: Race walking
- Club: FC Porto

Achievements and titles
- Personal bests: 20 km walk: 1:22:40 (1999); 50 km walk: 3:55:14 (2007)

Augusto Manuel Ferreira Cardoso Pereira (born December 13, 1972) is a Portuguese race walker. He set a personal best time of 3:55:14, by finishing sixteenth for the men's 50 km at the 2007 European Race Walking Cup in Royal Leamington Spa, England.

Cardoso represented Portugal at the 2008 Summer Olympics in Beijing, where he competed for the men's 50 km race walk, along with his teammate António Pereira. He successfully finished the race in fortieth place by twenty-eight seconds behind United States' Philip Dunn, with a time of 4:09:00.
