= 1994 European Athletics Indoor Championships – Men's 5000 metres walk =

The men's 5000 metres walk event at the 1994 European Athletics Indoor Championships was held in Palais Omnisports de Paris-Bercy on 12 and 13 March. This was the last time that this event was contested at the European Athletics Indoor Championships.

== Medalists ==
Gold	Silver	Bronze
Mikhail Shchennikov; Russia	Ronald Weigel; Germany	Denis Langlois; France

== Results ==
=== Heats ===
First 5 from each heat (Q) and the next 2 fastest (q) qualified for the final.

Rank	Heat	Name	Nationality	Time	Notes
1	1	Denis Langlois	France	19:03.42	Q
2	1	Stefan Johansson	Sweden	19:06.81	Q
3	1	Mikhail Shchennikov	Russia	19:07.58	Q
4	1	Ronald Weigel	Germany	19:08.46	Q
5	1	Michele Didoni	Italy	19:09.60	Q
6	1	Yevgeniy Misyulya	Belarus	19:15.26	q
7	2	Jean-Claude Corré	France	19:17.66	Q
8	2	Giovanni De Benedictis	Italy	19:18.39	Q
9	2	Vladimir Andreyev	Russia	19:18.52	Q
10	2	Frants Kostyukevich	Belarus	19:21.84	Q
11	2	Tomáš Kratochvíl	Czech Republic	19:27.46	Q
12	1	Pavol Blažek	Slovakia	19:31.60	q
13	1	Vladimir Druchik	Ukraine	19:37.93	
14	2	Karol Repaský	Slovakia	19:44.77	
15	2	Igor Kollár	Slovakia	19:55.07	
16	1	Viacheslav Fediuc	Moldova	19:59.87	
17	2	Jean-Oliver Brosseau	France	20:00.12	
18	2	Denis Trautmann	Germany	20:32.41	
	1	Costică Bălan	Romania	DQ	
	1	Jiří Malysa	Czech Republic	DQ	
	2	Robert Korzeniowski	Poland	DQ	
	2	Jan Staaf	Sweden	DQ	
	2	Anatoliy Kozlov	Ukraine	DQ	

=== Final ===
Rank	Name	Nationality	Time	Notes
1st place, gold medalist(s)	Mikhail Shchennikov	Russia	18:34.32	
2nd place, silver medalist(s)	Ronald Weigel	Germany	18:40.32	
3rd place, bronze medalist(s)	Denis Langlois	France	18:43.20	NR
4	Michele Didoni	Italy	19:01.03	
5	Jean-Claude Corré	France	19:10.24	
6	Pavol Blažek	Slovakia	19:14.00	
7	Yevgeniy Misyulya	Belarus	19:17.74	
8	Stefan Johansson	Sweden	19:21.82	
9	Tomáš Kratochvíl	Czech Republic	20:27.60	
	Giovanni De Benedictis	Italy	DNF	
	Frants Kostyukevich	Belarus	DQ	
	Vladimir Andreyev	Russia	DQ	
