= 1992 European Athletics Indoor Championships – Men's 5000 metres walk =

The men's 5000 metres walk event at the 1992 European Athletics Indoor Championships was held in Palasport di Genova on 28 February.

== Results ==
Rank	Name	Nationality	Time	Notes
1st place, gold medalist(s)	Giovanni De Benedictis	Italy	18:19.97	CR, NR
2nd place, silver medalist(s)	Frants Kostyukevich	Unified Team	18:25.40	
3rd place, bronze medalist(s)	Stefan Johansson	Sweden	18:27.95	NR
4	Ronald Weigel	Germany	18:44.74	
5	Igor Kollár	Czechoslovakia	19:03.12	
6	Jan Staaf	Sweden	19:04.48	
7	Robert Ihly	Germany	19:04.52	
8	Miroslav Boško	Czechoslovakia	19:04.98	
9	Jean-Claude Corré	France	19:05.61	
10	Karol Repaský	Czechoslovakia	19:15.28	
11	Denis Langlois	France	19:19.29	
12	Valdas Kazlauskas	Lithuania	19:25.01	
13	Pietro Fiorini	Italy	19:34.48	
	Grigoriy Kornev	Unified Team	DQ	
