= 45th Guldbagge Awards =

Annual Swedish awards ceremony

- Date: 25 January 2010
- Site: Cirkus, Stockholm
- Hosted by: Johan Glans

Highlights
- Best Picture: The Girl with the Dragon Tattoo
- Most awards: The Girl with the Dragon Tattoo, Glowing Stars & Bröllopsfotografen (2)
- Most nominations: Glowing Stars, The Girl with the Dragon Tattoo & The Girl (4)

Television coverage
- Network: SVT

The 45th Guldbagge Awards ceremony, presented by the Swedish Film Institute, honored the best Swedish films of 2009, and took place on 25 January 2010, and was hosted by Johan Glans, for the second year in a row. The Girl with the Dragon Tattoo directed by Niels Arden Oplev was presented with the award for Best Film.

== Winner and nominees ==
=== Awards ===
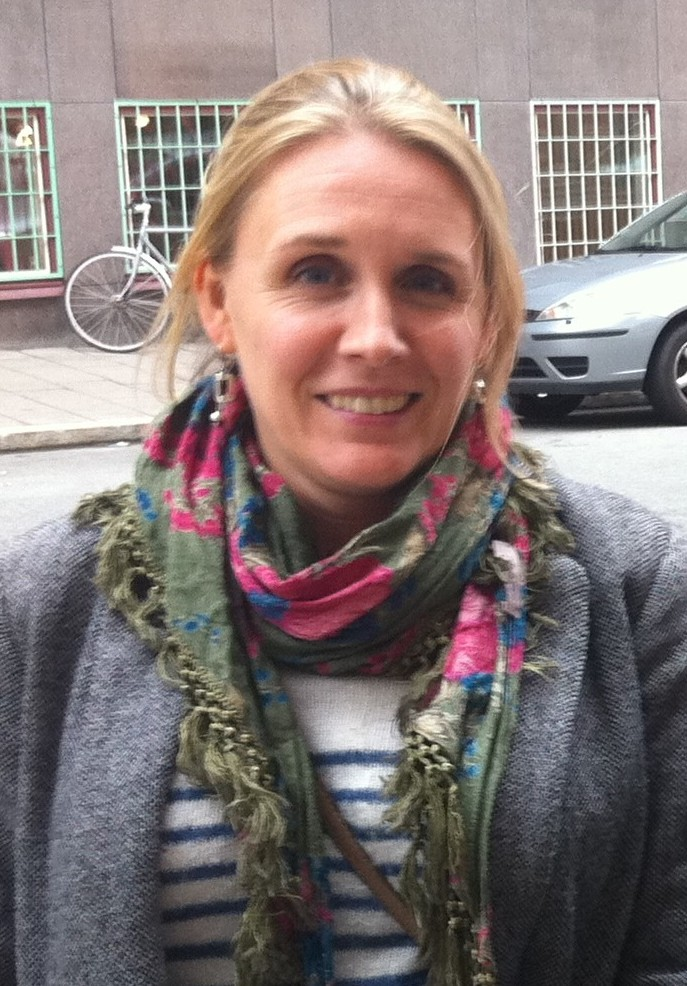
Lisa Siwe, Best Director winner

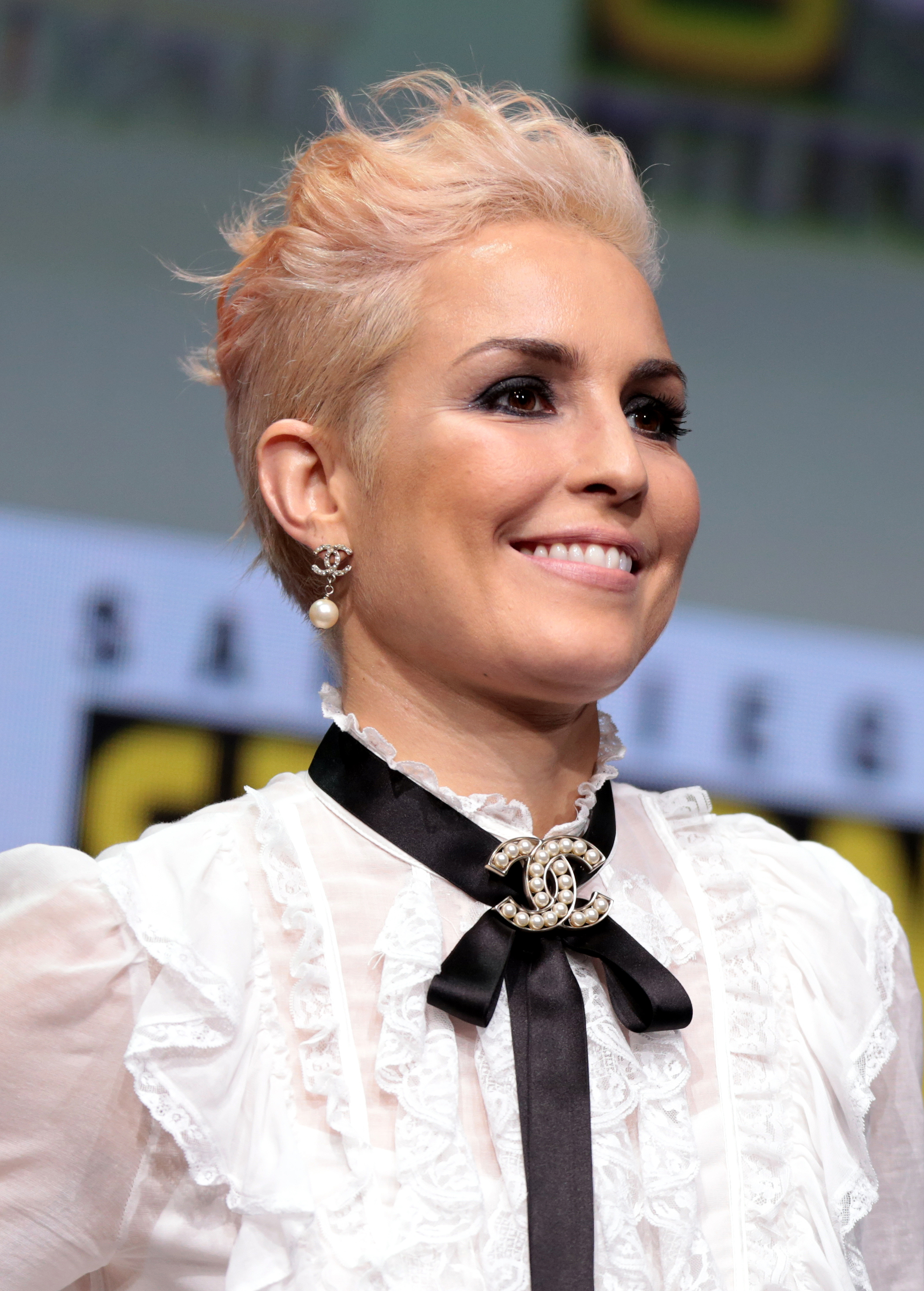
Noomi Rapace, Best Actress winner

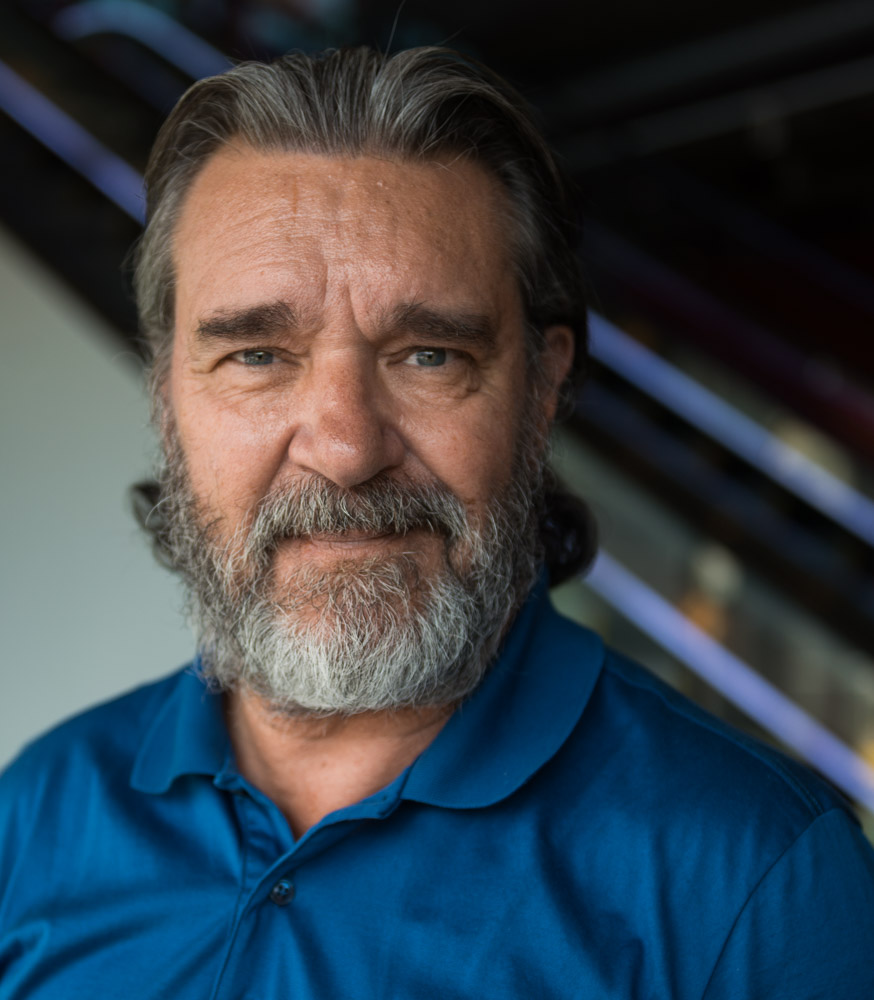
Kjell Bergqvist, Best Supporting Actor winner

Best Film: The Girl with the Dragon Tattoo – Søren Stærmose; Glowing Stars – Anders Landström; Starring Maja – Sandra Harms	Best Director: Lisa Siwe – Glowing Stars; Fredrik Edfeldt – The Girl; Teresa Fabik – Starring Maja
Best Actress in a leading role: Noomi Rapace – The Girl with the Dragon Tattoo; Malin Crépin – In Your Veins; Stina Ekblad – A Rational Solution	Best Actor in a leading role: Claes Ljungmark – A Rational Solution; Olle Sarri – The Ape; Björn Starrin – Bröllopsfotografen
Best Supporting Actress: Anki Lidén – Glowing Stars; Annika Hallin – Glowing Stars; Tova Magnusson-Norling – The Girl	Best Supporting Actor: Kjell Bergqvist – Bröllopsfotografen; Joel Kinnaman – Johan Falk – Gruppen för särskilda insatser; Sven-Bertil Taube – The Girl with the Dragon Tattoo
Best Screenplay: Ulf Malmros – Bröllopsfotografen; Karin Arrhenius – The Girl; Teresa Fabik – Starring Maja	Best Cinematography: Hoyte van Hoytema – The Girl; Eric Kress – The Girl with the Dragon Tattoo; Peter Mokrosinski – The Girl Who Played with Fire
Best Documentary Feature: Ebbe - The Movie – Karin af Klintberg and Jane Magnusson; The Queen and I – Nahid Persson Sarvestani; Videocracy – Erik Gandini	Best Shortfilm: Scratches – Gabriela Pichler; A Good Friend of Mr. World – Axel Petersén; Dreams from the Woods – Johannes Nyholm
Best Foreign Film: (Germany) The White Ribbon – Michael Haneke; (Israel) (Germany) (France) Waltz with Bashir – Ari Folman; (Japan) Still Walking – Hirokazu Kore-eda	Honorary Award: Waldemar Bergendahl, film producer
Gullspiran: Maggie Widstrand, casting director	Cinema Audience Award: The Girl with the Dragon Tattoo; Bröllopsfotografen; The Girl Who Played with Fire
Best Achievement: Isak Gjertsen, chefsanimatör; Malte Forssell, line producer; Johan Söderberg, film editor and composer

== See also ==
- 82nd Academy Awards
- 67th Golden Globe Awards
- 63rd British Academy Film Awards
- 16th Screen Actors Guild Awards
- 15th Critics' Choice Awards
- 30th Golden Raspberry Awards
