= 1989 European Athletics Indoor Championships – Men's 5000 metres walk =

The men's 5000 metres walk event at the 1989 European Athletics Indoor Championships was held on 19 February.

== Results ==
Rank	Name	Nationality	Time	Notes
1st place, gold medalist(s)	Mikhail Shchennikov	Soviet Union	18:35.60	CR
2nd place, silver medalist(s)	Roman Mrázek	Czechoslovakia	18:40.11	
3rd place, bronze medalist(s)	Giovanni De Benedictis	Italy	18:43.45	
4	Pavol Blažek	Czechoslovakia	18:55.78	
5	Sándor Urbanik	Hungary	19:50.87	
6	Jaime Barroso	Spain	19:56.97	
7	Vyacheslav Ivanenko	Soviet Union	20:11.32	
8	José Urbano	Portugal	20:17.12	
9	Martin Toporek	Austria	22:11.59	
10	Uffe Mathiesen	Denmark	23:12.72	
11	Mogens Corfitz	Denmark	23:20.37	
	Jimmy McDonald	Ireland	DNF	
	Walter Arena	Italy	DQ	
	Jan Staaf	Sweden	DQ	
