= 1986 World Junior Championships in Athletics – Men's 10,000 metres walk =

The men's 10,000 metres walk event at the 1986 World Junior Championships in Athletics was held in Athens, Greece, at Olympic Stadium on 18 July.

== Medalists ==
Gold	Mikhail Shchennikov; Soviet Union
Silver	Salvatore Cacia; Italy
Bronze	Ricardo Pueyo; Spain

== Results ==
=== Final ===
18 July

Rank	Name	Nationality	Time	Notes
1st place, gold medalist(s)	Mikhail Shchennikov	Soviet Union	40:38.01	
2nd place, silver medalist(s)	Salvatore Cacia	Italy	40:40.73	
3rd place, bronze medalist(s)	Ricardo Pueyo	Spain	40:41.05	
4	Giovanni De Benedictis	Italy	41:06.95	
5	Wolfram Kienast	East Germany	41:15.96	
6	Stefan Johansson	Sweden	41:27.13	
7	Carlos Mercenario	Mexico	41:50.20	
8	Wu Chaocai	China	42:03.17	
9	Juan José Barranco	Spain	43:05.98	
10	Mikhail Orlov	Soviet Union	43:09.49	
11	André Kowalsky	East Germany	43:25.96	
12	Paul Copeland	Australia	43:27.32	
13	Carlo Müller	West Germany	43:44.63	
14	Magnus Morenius	Sweden	43:49.03	
15	Paulo Santos	Portugal	43:57.68	
16	Dimítrios Tsiris	Greece	44:19.06	
17	Douglas Fournier	United States	44:20.80	
18	Mito Cvjetkovic	Yugoslavia	44:37.84	
19	Darrell Stone	United Kingdom	44:57.50	
20	Craig Brill	Australia	45:27.63	
21	Peter Tichý	Czechoslovakia	45:34.87	
22	Dirk Van De Bosch	Belgium	45:36.32	
23	Daniel Vargas	Cuba	45:38.91	
24	Csaba Kovács	Hungary	45:40.52	
25	Marko Kivimäki	Finland	45:47.62	
26	Juan Carlos Vargas	Costa Rica	46:02.19	
27	Benoît Gauthier	Canada	46:30.57	
28	Curt Clausen	United States	47:00.40	
29	Mario Álvarez	Cuba	47:22.17	
30	Chris MacKay	Canada	51:14.08	
31	Walid Juma Deeb Akasha	Palestine	52:42.90	

== Participation ==
According to an unofficial count, 31 athletes from 22 countries participated in the event.

- Australia (2)
- Belgium (1)
- Canada (2)
- China (1)
- Costa Rica (1)
- Cuba (2)
- Czechoslovakia (1)
- East Germany (2)
- Finland (1)
- Greece (1)
- Hungary (1)
- Italy (2)
- Mexico (1)
- Palestine (1)
- Portugal (1)
- Soviet Union (2)
- Spain (2)
- Sweden (2)
- United Kingdom (1)
- United States (2)
- West Germany (1)
- Yugoslavia (1)
