= 2024 World Athletics Race Walking Tour =

International racewalking event series

The 2024 World Athletics Race Walking Tour was the 21st edition of the annual international racewalking series organised by World Athletics.

US$160,000 of prize money was provided, with $80,000 for men and $80,000 for women including a first-place prize of $25,000. The winners were decided by their combined top three World Athletics Rankings performances from either the 20 km race walk (5km, 10km, 15km) or 35 km race walk (30km, 50km) event groups.

At least two of the performances per athlete had to come from a 2024 Race Walking Tour event, while the third may come from any race walking competition on the World Athletics Calendar.

== Calendar ==
The following meetings, as well as the competition final, formed the schedule of the 2024 Race Walking Tour.

Date	Meeting	Venue	Country
Gold (7)
3 Mar 2024	Chinese Race Walking Grand Prix	Taicang	China
16 Mar 2024	Dudinska 50	Dudince	Slovakia
6 Apr 2024	Poděbrady Walking	Poděbrady	Czech Republic
5 May 2024	Korzeniowski Warsaw Race Walking Cup	Warsaw	Poland
11 May 2024	Grande Prémio Internacional de Rio Maior em Marcha Atlética	Rio Maior	Portugal
18 May 2024	Gran Premio Cantones de A Coruna de Marcha	A Coruña	Spain
6 Oct 2024	Gran Premio Internacional Finetwork Madrid Marcha	Madrid	Spain
Silver (4)
21 Jan 2024	USA Marathon Race Walk Mixed Relay Championships & International Race Walk Invitational	Santee	United States
11 Feb 2024	Oceanian & Australian 20km Race Walking Championships	Adelaide	Australia
25 May 2024	Záhorácka Dvadsiatka	Borský Mikuláš	Slovakia
26 Oct 2024	Lusatian International Race-Walking Meeting	Zittau	Germany
Bronze (7)
17 Dec 2023	World Race Walking Tour	Dublin	Ireland
20 Jan 2024	Turkish Race Walking Championships	Antalya	Turkey
27 Jan 2024	Supernova	Canberra	Australia
3 Feb 2024	Ecuadorian Race Walking Championships Memorial Luis Chocho Sanmartin	Loja	Ecuador
4 Feb 2024	Gran Premio de Marcha Atlética Ciudad de Guadix	Guadix	Spain
25 Feb 2024	Spanish Open 20km Championships	Zaragoza	Spain
27 Apr 2024	The Penn Relay Carnival	Philadelphia	United States
