= The Breakthrough (TV series) =

Swedish television series

- Genre: Nordic noir
- Based on: The Breakthrough: How the Genealogist Solved the Double Murder in Linköping by Anna Bodin and Peter Sjölund
- Screenplay by: Oskar Söderlund
- Directed by: Lisa Siwe
- Starring: Peter Eggers; Mattias Nordkvist; Jessica Liedberg; Jonatan Rodriguez; Karin de Frumerie; Annika Hallin
- Country of origin: Sweden
- Original language: Swedish
- No. of series: 1
- No. of episodes: 4

Production
- Executive producer: Elin Kvist
- Producer: Lejla Bešić
- Production company: FLX

Original release
- Network: Netflix
- Release: 7 January 2025

The Breakthrough (Swedish: Genombrottet) is a 2025 Swedish limited crime drama television series directed by Lisa Siwe and produced by FLX for Netflix. It is based on a non-fiction book by journalist Anna Bodin and genealogist Peter Sjölund about how the 2004 murders of Mohammed Ammouri and Anna-Lena Svensson were finally solved in 2020 through forensic genetic genealogy. It premiered on Netflix on 7 January 2025.

== Premise ==
In 2004, an eight-year-old boy and a 56-year-old woman are stabbed to death in broad daylight in the Swedish city of Linköping. In spite of spending more than 15 years on the case, making it the largest criminal investigation in Swedish history (except for the one after the assassination of Olof Palme in 1986), the police can't find the murderer and the lead investigator is told to close down the investigation. But then he happens to read an article about a 40 year old murder case in the United States having just been solved through a brand new method, where a murderer's DNA is used to find ancestors on genealogy websites and then follow their family trees back to modern times. The investigator asks his bosses to let him try this as a last attempt before making it a cold case. They agree, so he engages a genealogist who specialises in finding people's recent relatives by employing this method, and together they manage to find the murderer.

== Cast ==
- Peter Eggers as John
- Mattias Nordkvist as Per
- Jessica Liedberg as Francy
- Karin de Frumerie as Lollo
- Annika Hallin as Karin
- Julia Sporre as Stina
- Malin Güettler as Annika
- Helen Al-Janabi as Elena
- Bahador Foladi as Saad
- Per Burell as Kjell
- Julius Fleischanderl as Ante
- Jonatan Rodriguez as Miran
- Anna Azcárate as Gunilla
- Marley Norstad as Adnan
- Pevin Hannah Namek Sali as Maya
- Emelie Falk as Anna
- Magnus Mark as Björn

== Production ==
The four-part series is a fictionalised retelling of a 2021 non-fiction book by journalist Anna Bodin and genealogist Peter Sjölund, entitled Genombrottet: Så löste släktforskaren dubbelmordet i Linköping (The Breakthrough: How the genealogist solved the double murder in Linköping). The book was adapted for the TV series by Oskar Söderlund and director was Lisa Siwe. Producer for FLX was Lejla Bešić, and Elin Kvist was executive producer.

The cast is led by Peter Eggers, Mattias Nordkvist, Jessica Liedberg, Jonatan Rodriguez, Karin de Frumerie and Annika Hallin. The series was filmed in Linköping, where the real murders took place in 2004.

Peter Eggers plays a character based on real life policeman and Olympic race walker Jan Staaf.

== Release ==
The series was released on Netflix on 7 January 2025.

== Reception ==
The series was reviewed positively in The Guardian, which said that it "is linear, precise, and tells the story of what happened from beginning to end, with care, and without much fuss." The series received a less positive review in The Times, which said that the narrative is "told in a knowingly artistic way, but without an artistic point".
