= 1990 European Athletics Indoor Championships – Men's 5000 metres walk =

The men's 5000 metres walk event at the 1990 European Athletics Indoor Championships was held in Kelvin Hall on 4 March.

== Results ==
Rank	Name	Nationality	Time	Notes
1st place, gold medalist(s)	Mikhail Shchennikov	Soviet Union	19:00.62	
2nd place, silver medalist(s)	Giovanni De Benedictis	Italy	19:02.90	
3rd place, bronze medalist(s)	Axel Noack	East Germany	19:08.36	
4	Pavol Blažek	Czechoslovakia	19:15.78	
5	Ján Záhončík	Czechoslovakia	19:22.70	
6	Massimo Fizialetti	Italy	19:29.14	
7	Jan Staaf	Sweden	19:34.08	
8	Franz-Josef Weber	West Germany	19:51.89	
9	Lyubomir Ivanov	Bulgaria	19:54.78	
10	Igor Plotnikov	Soviet Union	20:01.11	
11	Hélder Oliveira	Portugal	20:04.04	
12	Andi Drake	Great Britain	20:10.83	
	Dimitrios Orfanopoulos	Greece	DNF	
	Volkmar Scholz	West Germany	DQ	
	Pat Murphy	Ireland	DQ	
