= 1989 IAAF World Indoor Championships – Men's 5000 metres walk =

The men's 5000 metres walk event at the 1989 IAAF World Indoor Championships was held at the Budapest Sportcsarnok in Budapest on 5 March.

== Results ==
Rank	Name	Nationality	Time	Notes
1st place, gold medalist(s)	Mikhail Shchennikov	Soviet Union	18:27.10	WR, CR
2nd place, silver medalist(s)	Roman Mrázek	Czechoslovakia	18:28.90	PB
3rd place, bronze medalist(s)	Frants Kostyukevich	Soviet Union	18:34.07	PB
4	Sándor Urbanik	Hungary	18:34.77	NR
5	Giovanni De Benedictis	Italy	18:40.87	NR
6	Pavol Blažek	Czechoslovakia	18:41.34	PB
7	Simon Baker	Australia	19:24.12	PB
8	Andrew Jachno	Australia	189:25.24	PB
9	Jimmy McDonald	Ireland	19:25.24	NR
10	Alberto Cruz	Mexico	20:18.99	
11	Ignacio Zamudio	Mexico	21:06.14	
	José Urbano	Portugal	DQ	
