= 1994 European Athletics Championships – Men's 20 kilometres walk =

Men's 20 kilometres walk at the European Athletics Championships

These are the official results of the Men's 20 km walk event at the 1994 European Championships in Helsinki, Finland. There were a total number of 29 participating athletes, with the race held on 8 August 1994.

== Medalists ==
Gold	Mikhail Shchennikov; Russia (RUS)
Silver	Yevgeniy Misyulya; Belarus (BLR)
Bronze	Valentí Massana; Spain (ESP)

== Final ==
Rank	Final	Time
	Mikhail Shchennikov (RUS)	1:18.45
	Yevgeniy Misyulya (BLR)	1:19.22
	Valentí Massana (ESP)	1:20.33
4.	Giovanni De Benedictis (ITA)	1:20.39
5.	Mikhail Orlov (RUS)	1:21.01
6.	Giovanni Perricelli (ITA)	1:21.52
7.	Igor Kollár (SVK)	1:22.23
8.	Sándor Urbanik (HUN)	1:22.49
9.	Hubert Sonnek (TCH)	1:23.11
10.	Michele Didoni (ITA)	1:23.21
11.	Fernando Vázquez (ESP)	1:23.22
12.	Jean-Claude Corre (FRA)	1:23.42
13.	Róbert Valíček (SVK)	1:24.13
14.	Viacheslav Fediuc (MDA)	1:25.07
15.	Denis Langlois (FRA)	1:25.12
16.	Claus Jørgensen (DEN)	1:25.29
17.	Aigars Fadejevs (LAT)	1:26.06
18.	Ilya Markov (RUS)	1:26.53
19.	Valdas Kazlauskas (LTU)	1:27.02
20.	Modris Liepiņš (LAT)	1:27.14
21.	Antero Lindman (FIN)	1:27.56
22.	Jani Lehtinen (FIN)	1:31.55
23.	Pauli Pirjetä (FIN)	1:33.01
—	Mikhail Khmelnitskiy (BLR)	DSQ
—	Daniel Plaza (ESP)	DSQ
—	Robert Korzeniowski (POL)	DSQ
—	Ronald Weigel (GER)	DNF
—	Viktoras Meškauskas (LTU)	DNF
—	Stefan Johansson (SWE)	DNF

== Participation ==
According to an unofficial count, 29 athletes from 16 countries participated in the event.

- Belarus (2)
- Czech Republic (1)
- Denmark (1)
- Finland (3)
- France (2)
- Germany (1)
- Hungary (1)
- Italy (3)
- Latvia (2)
- Lithuania (2)
- Moldova (1)
- Poland (1)
- Russia (3)
- Slovakia (2)
- Spain (3)
- Sweden (1)

== See also ==
- 1990 Men's European Championships 20km Walk (Split)
- 1991 Men's World Championships 20km Walk (Tokyo)
- 1992 Men's Olympic 20km Walk (Barcelona)
- 1993 Men's World Championships 20km Walk (Stuttgart)
- 1995 Men's World Championships 20km Walk (Gothenburg)
- 1996 Men's Olympic 20km Walk (Atlanta)
- 1997 Men's World Championships 20km Walk (Athens)
- 1998 Men's European Championships 20km Walk (Budapest)
