= 1993 IAAF World Indoor Championships – Men's 5000 metres walk =

The men's 5000 metres walk event at the 1993 IAAF World Indoor Championships was held on 13 and 14 March.

== Medalists ==
Gold	Silver	Bronze
Mikhail Shchennikov; Russia	Robert Korzeniowski; Poland	Mikhail Orlov; Russia

== Results ==
=== Heats ===
First 4 of each heat (Q) and next 2 fastest (q) qualified for the final.

Rank	Heat	Name	Nationality	Time	Notes
1	1	Robert Korzeniowski	Poland	18:56.07	Q
2	1	Stefan Johansson	Sweden	18:58.95	Q
3	1	Mikhail Orlov	Russia	19:01.58	Q
4	2	Tim Berrett	Canada	19:20.45	Q
5	2	Frants Kostyukevich	Belarus	19:21.24	Q
6	2	Mikhail Shchennikov	Russia	19:21.35	Q
7	2	Jean-Claude Corré	France	19:23.38	Q
8	1	Ronald Weigel	Germany	19:24.88	Q
9	1	Sérgio Galdino	Brazil	19:28.87	q, AR
10	1	Costică Bălan	Romania	19:29.58	q
11	2	Sergey Shildkret	Azerbaijan	21:45.56	NR
12	1	Roman Lobachev	Azerbaijan	21:55.88	
	1	Roman Mrázek	Slovakia	DQ	
	2	Miroslav Boško	Slovakia	DQ	
	2	Ademar José Kammler	Brazil	DQ	

=== Final ===
Rank	Name	Nationality	Time	Notes
1st place, gold medalist(s)	Mikhail Shchennikov	Russia	18:32.10	
2nd place, silver medalist(s)	Robert Korzeniowski	Poland	18:35.91	
3rd place, bronze medalist(s)	Mikhail Orlov	Russia	18:43.48	
4	Tim Berrett	Canada	18:53.02	
5	Ronald Weigel	Germany	19:02.73	
6	Jean-Claude Corré	France	19:10.72	
7	Costică Bălan	Romania	19:12.73	
8	Stefan Johansson	Sweden	20:30.32	
	Sérgio Galdino	Brazil	DQ	
	Frants Kostyukevich	Belarus	DQ	
