= 1988 European Athletics Indoor Championships – Men's 5000 metres walk =

The men's 5000 metres walk event at the 1988 European Athletics Indoor Championships was held on 6 March.

== Results ==
Rank	Name	Nationality	Time	Notes
1st place, gold medalist(s)	Jozef Pribilinec	Czechoslovakia	18:44.40	CR
2nd place, silver medalist(s)	Roman Mrázek	Czechoslovakia	18:44.93	
3rd place, bronze medalist(s)	Sándor Urbanik	Hungary	18:45.91	
4	Erling Andersen	Norway	18:49.10	NR
5	Zdzisław Szlapkin	Poland	18:49.49	
6	Jos Martens	Belgium	18:54.67	NR
7	Giovanni De Benedictis	Italy	18:58.40	
8	Lyubomir Ivanov	Bulgaria	19:00.02	
9	Pavol Blažek	Czechoslovakia	19:03.82	
10	Sergey Protishin	Soviet Union	19:18.30	
11	Jean-Claude Corre	France	19:20.03	
12	Jan Staaf	Sweden	19:20.81	
13	José Urbano	Portugal	19:41.79	
14	Karoly Kirszt	Hungary	20:23.50	
15	Dirk Vandebosch	Belgium	21:02.09	
	Mikhail Shchennikov	Soviet Union	DQ	
	Bo Gustafsson	Sweden	DQ	
