= Sven Haraldsson =

Swedish designer (born 1977)

Sven Haraldsson (born 22 March 1977 in Jönköping), is a Swedish production designer and costume designer. He was educated at the Dramatiska Institutet between 2003 and 2006.
