= Athletics at the 1993 Summer Universiade – Men's 20 kilometres walk =

The men's 20 kilometres walk event at the 1993 Summer Universiade was held in Buffalo, United States on 17 July 1993.

== Results ==
Rank	Athlete	Nationality	Time	Notes
1st place, gold medalist(s)	Robert Korzeniowski	Poland	1:22:01	GR
2nd place, silver medalist(s)	Daniel García	Mexico	1:22:58	
3rd place, bronze medalist(s)	Bernardo Segura	Mexico	1:24:11	
4	Peter Malik	Slovakia	1:25:10	
5	Mikhail Khmelnitskiy	Belarus	1:26:23	
6	Mao Xinyuan	China	1:27:37	
7	Paolo Bianchi	Italy	1:28:45	
8	Tim Berrett	Canada	1:30:07	
9	Curt Clausen	United States	1:32:18	
10	Rob Cole	United States	1:33:19	
11	Aleksandar Raković	Independent Participants	1:34:51	
12	José Torres	Puerto Rico	1:39:41	
13	Mikhail Rodríguez	Venezuela	1:54:39	
	Arturo Di Mezza	Italy	DNF	
