= Jean-Claude Corre =

French racewalker

Personal information
- Born: 14 September 1961 (age 64) Montreal, Quebec, Canada
- Height: 1.72 m (5 ft 8 in)
- Weight: 58 kg (128 lb)

Sport
- Sport: Athletics
- Event: Racewalking
- Club: AC Clichy-sous-Bois

Jean-Claude Corre (born 14 September 1961) is a French retired race walker. He represented his country at the 1988 Summer Olympics as well as one indoor and three outdoor World Championships. Corre was born in Montreal, Quebec, Canada.

== Competition record ==
Year	Competition	Venue	Position	Event	Notes
Representing France
1983	World Race Walking Cup	Bergen, Norway	12th	50 km walk	4:05:32
1987	World Race Walking Cup	New York City, United States	20th	50 km walk	3:58:26
1987	World Championships	Rome, Italy	7th	50 km walk	1:23.38
1987	Mediterranean Games	Latakia, Syria	5th	20 km walk	1:28:44
1988	European Indoor Championships	Budapest, Hungary	11th	5000 m walk	19:20.03
1988	Olympic Games	Seoul, South Korea	20th	20 km walk	1:23:09
1989	World Race Walking Cup	L'Hospitalet, Spain	9th	20 km walk	1:22:02
1989	Jeux de la Francophonie	Casablanca, Morocco	2nd	20 km walk	1:28:39
1991	World Race Walking Cup	San Jose, United States	41st	20 km walk	1:25:35
1992	European Indoor Championships	Genoa, Italy	9th	5000 m walk	19:05.61
1993	World Indoor Championships	Toronto, Ontario, Canada	6th	5000 m walk	19:10.72
1993	World Race Walking Cup	Monterrey, Mexico	10th	50 km walk	4:01:12
1993	World Championships	Stuttgart, Germany	9th	50 km walk	3:51:51
1994	European Indoor Championships	Paris, France	5th	5000 m walk	19:10.24
1994	European Championships	Helsinki, Finland	12th	20 km walk	1:23.42
1995	World Race Walking Cup	Beijing, China	21st	50 km walk	3:56:57
1995	World Championships	Gothenburg, Sweden	24th	50 km walk	4:12.38

== Personal bests ==
Outdoor

- 10,000 metres walk – 39:44.87 (Dreux 1992)
- 20 kilometres walk – 1:23:09 (Seoul 1988)
- 50 kilometres walk – 3:51:51 (Stuttgart 1993)

Indoor

- 5000 metres walk – 18:50.48 (Paris 1994)
