= 1999 World Championships in Athletics – Men's 20 kilometres walk =

The Men's 20 km Walk at the 1999 World Championships in Sevilla, Spain was held on Saturday 21 August 1999, with the start at 18:45h local time.

== Medalists ==
Gold	Ilya Markov; Russia (RUS)
Silver	Jefferson Pérez; Ecuador (ECU)
Bronze	Daniel García; Mexico (MEX)

== Abbreviations ==
- All times shown are in hours:minutes:seconds

DNS	did not start
NM	no mark
WR	world record
AR	area record
NR	national record
PB	personal best
SB	season best

== Records ==
Standing records prior to the 1999 World Athletics Championships
World Record	Julio René Martínez (GUA)	1:17.46	May 8, 1999	Eisenhüttenstadt, Germany
Event Record	Maurizio Damilano (ITA)	1:19.37	August 24, 1991	Tokyo, Japan

== Intermediates ==
Rank	Number	Athlete	Time
5 KILOMETRES
1	1244	Ilya Markov (RUS)	21:10
2	1246	Roman Rasskazov (RUS)	21:10
3	674	Julio René Martínez (GUA)	21:10
4	996	Daniel García (MEX)	21:11
5	482	Denis Langlois (FRA)	21:11
10 KILOMETRES
1	1244	Ilya Markov (RUS)	42:51
2	674	Julio René Martínez (GUA)	42:51
3	130	Yevgeniy Misyulya (BLR)	42:51
4	780	Alessandro Gandellini (ITA)	42:52
5	367 b	Paquillo Fernández (ESP)	42:52
15 KILOMETRES
1	780	Alessandro Gandellini (ITA)	1:03:44
2	1244	Ilya Markov (RUS)	1:03:44
3	996	Daniel García (MEX)	1:03:44
4	1348	Igor Kollár (SVK)	1:03:45
5	239	Li Zewen (CHN)	1:03:45

== Final ranking ==
Rank	Athlete	Time	Note
1st place, gold medalist(s)	Ilya Markov (RUS)	1:23:34	
2nd place, silver medalist(s)	Jefferson Pérez (ECU)	1:24:19	
3rd place, bronze medalist(s)	Daniel García (MEX)	1:24:31	
4	Li Zewen (CHN)	1:24:43	
5	Alessandro Gandellini (ITA)	1:24:51	
6	Igor Kollár (SVK)	1:25:15	
7	Nathan Deakes (AUS)	1:25:26	
8	Giovanni De Benedictis (ITA)	1:25:33	
9	Ivan Trotski (BLR)	1:25:54	
10	Michele Didoni (ITA)	1:26:00	SB
11	Yevgeniy Misyulya (BLR)	1:26:08	
12	Alejandro López (ESP)	1:26:17	
13	Denis Langlois (FRA)	1:26:25	
14	Yu Guohui (CHN)	1:26:51	
15	Paquillo Fernández (ESP)	1:27:23	
16	Hatem Ghoula (TUN)	1:28:36	
17	Daisuke Ikeshima (JPN)	1:29:03	
18	Mikel Odriozola (ESP)	1:29:03	
19	Augusto Cardoso (POR)	1:29:33	
20	Liu Yunfeng (CHN)	1:31:26	
21	Valeriy Borisov (KAZ)	1:31:38	
22	Fedosei Ciumacenco (MDA)	1:32:08	
23	Claus Jørgensen (DEN)	1:34:47	
24	Timothy Seaman (USA)	1:35:58	
25	José Urbano (POR)	1:37:50	
26	Nick A'Hern (AUS)	1:38:08	
DID NOT FINISH (DNF)
—	Mikhail Khmelnitskiy (BLR)	DNF	
—	Bernardo Segura (MEX)	DNF	
—	Sándor Urbanik (HUN)	DNF	
—	Luis Fernando García (GUA)	DNF	
—	Andreas Erm (GER)	DNF	
—	Aigars Fadejevs (LAT)	DNF	
—	Roman Rasskazov (RUS)	DNF	
DISQUALIFIED (DSQ)
—	João Vieira (POR)	DSQ	
—	Arturo Huerta (CAN)	DSQ	
—	Vladimir Andreyev (RUS)	DSQ	
—	Róbert Valíček (SVK)	DSQ	
—	Birger Fält (SWE)	DSQ	
—	Julio René Martínez (GUA)	DSQ	

== See also ==
- 1999 Race Walking Year Ranking
