= 1983 European Athletics Indoor Championships – Men's 5000 metres walk =

The men's 5000 metres walk event at the 1983 European Athletics Indoor Championships was held on 5 March.

== Results ==
Rank	Name	Nationality	Time	Notes
1st place, gold medalist(s)	Anatoliy Solomin	Soviet Union	19:19.93	
2nd place, silver medalist(s)	Yevgeniy Yevsyukov	Soviet Union	19:41.66	
3rd place, bronze medalist(s)	Erling Andersen	Norway	20:00.68	
4	Steve Barry	Great Britain	20:08.04	
5	Endre Andrasfai	Hungary	20:16.33	
6	Zoltán Farkas	Hungary	20:36.75	
7	Jozsef Szücs	Hungary	21:35.92	
	Martin Toporek	Austria	DQ	
