= Martin Toporek =

Austrian racewalker

Personal information
- Born: 15 February 1961 (age 65) Vienna, Austria
- Height: 1.78 m (5 ft 10 in)
- Weight: 63 kg (139 lb)

Sport
- Sport: Athletics
- Event: Race walking
- Club: SV Schwechat; ATuS Felixdorf; S.C.Hakoah
Medal record
Men's athletics
Representing Austria
European Indoor Championships
Bronze medal – third place	1982 Milan	5000 m walk

Martin Toporek (born 15 February 1961 in Vienna) is an Austrian racewalker. He represented his country at three consecutive Summer Olympics, in 1980, 1984, and 1988. In addition, he won a bronze medal at the 1982 European Indoor Championships.

In 1996 he tested positive for illegal stimulants substances, Methylephedrin, Ephedrin, und Pseudoephedrin, and was banned for three months.

== International competitions ==
Year	Competition	Venue	Position	Event	Notes
Representing Austria
1979	European Junior Championships	Bydgoszcz, Poland	13th	10,000 m walk	45:48.50
1980	Olympic Games	Moscow, Soviet Union	21st	20 km walk	1:44:56.0
1982	European Indoor Championships	Milan, Italy	3rd	5000 m walk	20:19.47
1983	European Indoor Championships	Budapest, Hungary	–	5000 m walk	DQ
1984	Olympic Games	Los Angeles, United States	29th	20 km walk	1:33:58
1986	European Championships	Stuttgart, West Germany	16th	20 km walk	1:36.14
1986	European Championships	Stuttgart, West Germany	21st	50 km walk	4:33.38
1987	European Indoor Championships	Liévin, France	–	5000 m walk	DQ
1989	European Indoor Championships	The Hague, Netherlands	9th	5000 m walk	22:11.59

== Personal bests ==
Outdoor

- 5000 metres walk – 16:03.50 (Südstadt 1979)
- 5 kilometres walk – 28:21 (Hlohovec 2013)
- 10,000 metres walk – 41:53.59 (Schwechat 1981)
- 10 kilometres walk – 42:02 (Kremniza 1980)
- 20 kilometres walk – 1:25:32 (Bergen 1986) NR
- 30 kilometres walk – 3:46:03 (Vienna 2011)
- 50 kilometres walk – 4:20:10 (Dudince 1984)

Indoor

- 3000 metres walk – 11:12.0 (Vienna 1983)
- 5000 metres walk – 19:37.57 (Vienna 1986) NR
