= Giovanni De Benedictis =

Italian race walker

Personal information
- Full name: Giovanni Angelo Maria De Benedictis
- Nickname: Gianni
- Nationality: Italian
- Born: January 8, 1968 (age 58) Pescara, Italy
- Height: 1.83 m (6 ft 0 in)
- Weight: 63 kg (139 lb)

Sport
- Country: Italy
- Sport: Athletics
- Event: Racewalking
- Club: C.S. Carabinieri
- Coached by: Mario De Benedictis

Achievements and titles
- Personal bests: 3000 m walk: 10:47.11 (1990); 10,000 m walk: 38:40.18 (1995); 20 km walk: 1:20:29 (1991); 30 km walk: 2:09:25 (2002); 50 km walk: 3:48:06 (2002)
Medal record
Event	1st	2nd	3rd
Olympic Games	0	0	1
World Championships	0	1	0
World Indoor Championships	0	1	0
European Indoor Championships	1	1	1
Mediterranean Games	1	0	0
European Junior Championships	1	0	1
Total	3	3	3
Olympic Games
Bronze medal – third place	1992 Barcelona	20 km Walk
World Race Walking Cup
Gold medal – first place	1991 San Josè	Combined Team
Silver medal – second place	1993 Monterrey	20 km Team
Silver medal – second place	1995 Beijing	Combined Team
Bronze medal – third place	1993 Monterrey	Combined Team

Giovanni De Benedictis (born 8 January 1968, in Pescara) is a retired Italian race walker, that won 9 medals at individual level, 7 of these at senior level, at the International athletics competitions. He participated at five editions of the Summer Olympics (from 1988 to 2004), this like only two others Italian athletes in track and field: the other racewalker champion Abdon Pamich and the sprinter Pietro Mennea. He also won four medals at the IAAF World Race Walking Cup team events (Lugano Trophy).

== Biography ==
Giovanni De Benedictis has won 28 times the individual national championship, third of all-time after Abdon Pamich (40) and Antonio Ambu (34). He has 42 caps in seventeen years in the national team from 1987 to 2004.

In addition to the five Olympic Games, he participated in six World Outdoor Championships and two of the World Indoor, four editions of the European Outdoor Championships and five European Indoor, six editions of the World Race Walking Cup and four of the European Race Walking Cup.

== World best performances ==
- 3000 metres race walk: 10:47.11, (Italy) San Giovanni Valdarno, 19 May 1990. world record held until 4 February 2001, and was beaten by the German Andreas Erm.

== Achievements ==
Olympic Games
Year	Competition	Venue	Position	Event	Time	Notes
1988	Olympic Games	(South Korea) Seoul	9th	20 km	1:21:18	PB
1992	Olympic Games	(Spain) Barcelona	3rd	20 km	1:23:11	SB
1996	Olympic Games	(United States) Atlanta	27th	20 km	1:25:22	
2000	Olympic Games	(Australia) Sydney	16th	20 km	1:23:14	SB
2004	Olympic Games	(Greece) Athens	DNF	50 km	DSQ	
World Championships
Year	Competition	Venue	Position	Event	Time	Notes
1991	World Championships	(Japan) Tokyo	4th	20 km	1:20:29	PB
1993	World Championships	(Germany) Stuttgart	2nd	20 km	1:23:06	
1995	World Championships	(Sweden) Gothenburg	DNF	50 km	DSQ	
1997	World Championships	(Greece) Athens	8th	20 km	1:23:33	
1999	World Championships	(Spain) Sevilla	8th	20 km	1:25:33	
2001	World Championships	(Canada) Edmonton	DNF	50 km	Retired	
World Indoor Championships
Year	Competition	Venue	Position	Event	Time	Notes
1989	World Indoor Championships	(Hungary) Budapest	5th	5000 m	18:40.87	NR
1991	World Indoor Championships	(Spain) Seville	2nd	5000 m	18:23.60	NR
European Championships
Year	Competition	Venue	Position	Event	Time	Notes
1990	European Championships	(Socialist Federal Republic of Yugoslavia) Split	8th	20 km	1:24:51	
1994	European Championships	(Finland) Helsinki	4th	20 km	1:20:39	SB
1998	European Championships	(Hungary) Budapest	10th	20 km	1:25.06	
2002	European Championships	(Germany) Munich	DNF	50 km	DSQ	
European Indoor Championships
Year	Competition	Venue	Position	Event	Time	Notes
1988	European Indoor Championships	(Hungary) Budapest	6th	5000 m	18:58.40	
1989	European Indoor Championships	(Netherlands) The Hague	3rd	5000 m	18:43.45	
1990	European Indoor Championships	(United Kingdom) Glasgow	2nd	5000 m	19:02.90	
1992	European Indoor Championships	(Italy) Genoa	1st	5000 m	18:19.97	
1994	European Indoor Championships	(France) Paris	DNF	5000 m	NM	
World Race Walking Cup
Year	Competition	Venue	Position	Event	Time	Notes
1989	World Race Walking Cup	(Spain) L'Hospitalet	14th	20 km	1:22:25	SB
1991	World Race Walking Cup	(United States) San Jose	5th	20 km	1:21:13	PB
1993	World Race Walking Cup	(Mexico) Monterrey	7th	20 km	1:25:09	
1995	World Race Walking Cup	(China) Beijing	12th	50 km	3:49:30	
1997	World Race Walking Cup	(Czech Republic) Poděbrady	22nd	20 km	1:20:49	SB
2004	World Race Walking Cup	(Germany) Naumburg	10th	50 km	3:54:25	
European Race Walking Cup
Year	Competition	Venue	Position	Event	Time	Notes
1996	European Race Walking Cup	(Spain) A Coruña	10th	20 km	1:23:21	SB
1998	European Race Walking Cup	(Slovakia) Dudince	DNF	20 km	NM	
2000	European Race Walking Cup	(Germany) Eisenhüttenstadt	11th	20 km	1:21:43	SB
2001	European Race Walking Cup	(Slovakia) Dudince	15th	50 km	3:54:12	SB
Others competitions
Year	Competition	Venue	Position	Event	Time	Notes
1985	European Junior Championships	(East Germany) Cottbus	3rd	10,000 m	42:56.80	
1986	World Junior Championships	(Greece) Athens	4th	10,000 m	41:06.95	
1987	European Junior Championships	(United Kingdom) Birmingham	1st	10,000 m	39:44.71	
1989	World Military Championships	(Italy) Ostia	1st	20 km	1:24:21	
1993	World Military Championships	(France) Tours	1st	20 km		
1997	Mediterranean Games	(Italy) Bari	1st	20 km	1:24:59	

== National titles ==
He won 28 times the national championships at senior level.

Event	Outdoor	Indoor
20 km walk road	1989, 1990, 1991, 1993, 1996, 1997, 1999, 2001	
50 km walk road	2004, 2006	
10,000 metres walk track	1988, 1989, 1990, 1991, ~~1992~~, 1993, 1995, 1997, 2002	
5000 metres walk		1988, 1989, 1990, 1991, 1992, 1993, 1994, 1996, 1997, 1998
	18	10

== See also ==
- Italian Athletics Championships - Multi winners
- Italy at the IAAF World Race Walking Cup
- Italian all-time lists - 20 km walk
- Italian all-time lists - 50 km walk
- 3000 metres race walk All-time top 25 fastest
