= Annika Hallin =

Swedish actress (born 1968)

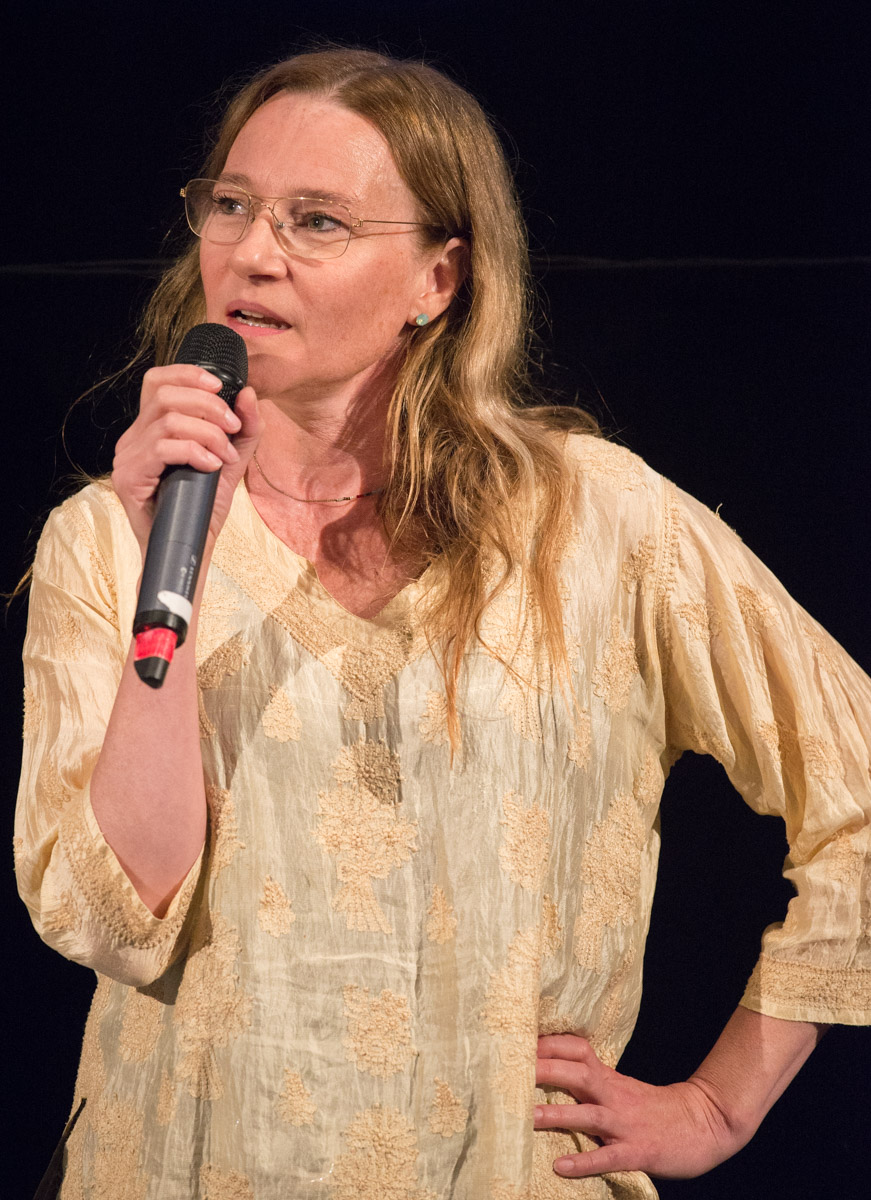
- Hallin in 2015
- Born: February 16, 1968 (age 58); Stockholm, Sweden
- Occupation: Actress
- Years active: 1993–present
- Spouse: Lars Norén (m. 2007–2013)
- Children: 3 (one with Norén)

Annika Hallin is a Swedish actress. She was born in Hägersten, Stockholm, and studied at the Swedish National Academy of Mime and Acting 1995 – 1999. In 2001 Hallin was one of those who started Teater Nova. She was married to Lars Norén (2007–2013), when they worked together at the National Swedish Touring Theatre and Judiska teatern with the play Stilla vatten, and they have a daughter together. Hallin has two daughters from an earlier relationship.

She was born on 16 February 1968.

== Filmography ==
- 1999: En häxa i familjen - Schoolteacher
- 2000: Soldater i månsken (TV miniseries) - Li
- 2002: Skeppsholmen (TV Series) - Anja Kulle
- 2002: Beck (TV series) - Mamman
- 2004: Graven (TV miniseries) - Fanny Popescu
- 2005: Kissed by Winter - Victoria
- 2006: När mörkret faller - Stella Forsberg
- 2007: Arn – The Knight Templar - Syster Leonore
- 2008: Arn – The Kingdom at Road's End - Syster Leonore (uncredited)
- 2008: Patrick, Idade 1,5 - Eva
- 2009: De halvt dolda (TV miniseries) - Mia
- 2009: Glowing Stars - Liv
- 2009: The Girl - The Mother
- 2009: Män som hatar kvinnor - Annika Giannini
- 2009: The Girl Who Played with Fire - Annika Giannini
- 2009: Luftslottet som sprängdes - Annika Giannini
- 2010: Pax - Legeass Kaja
- 2010: Wallander (TV series) - Claire
- 2010: Drottningoffret (TV Mini-Series) - Lili Frykberg
- 2011: Stockholm Östra - Minnas mamma
- 2011: Anno 1790 (TV series) - Eleonora Wide
- 2012: Flimmer - Ulla
- 2013: Crimes of Passion (TV series)
- 2014: Pojken med guldbyxorna - Katarina Heed
- 2015: My Skinny Sister - Karin
- 2015: Det borde finnas regler - Mamma
- 2017: Ravens - Veronika's Mother
- 2017: Black Widows (TV series) - Gittan Sundell
- 2022: Riding in Darkness (TV series)
- 2023: A Day and a Half - Dr. Gardelius
- 2024-2025: Faithless (TV series) - Daniella
- 2025: The Breakthrough - Karin
