= Daniel García (race walker) =

Mexican race walker (born 1971)

Personal information
- Full name: Daniel García Córdova
- Born: 28 October 1971 (age 55) Mexico City, Mexico
- Height: 168 cm (5 ft 6 in)
- Weight: 56 kg (123 lb)

Sport
- Country: Mexico
- Sport: Men's athletics
- Event: Race walking
Medal record
World Championships
Gold medal – first place	1997 Athens	20 km walk
Bronze medal – third place	1999 Seville	20 km walk
World Race Walking Cup
Gold medal – first place	1993 Monterrey	20 km walk
Silver medal – second place	1997 Poděbrady	20 km walk
Universiade
Gold medal – first place	1995 Fukuoka	20 km walk
Pan American Games
Silver medal – second place	1995 Mar del Plata	20 km walk
Silver medal – second place	1999 Winnipeg	20 km walk
Central American and Caribbean Games
Gold medal – first place	1993 Puerto Rico	20 km walk
Gold medal – first place	1998 Maracaibo	20 km walk
- Updated on 30 July 2013

Daniel García Córdova (born 28 October 1971) is a Mexican race walker.

== Personal bests ==
- 20 km: 1:18:27 hrs – Poděbrady, Czech Republic, 19 April 1997
- 50 km: 3:50:05 hrs – Atlanta, United States, 2 August 1996

== International competitions ==
Year	Competition	Venue	Position	Event	Notes
Representing Mexico
1990	Pan American Race Walking Cup	Xalapa, Mexico	—^{*}	50 km	4:05:47 hrs
1990	Central American and Caribbean Games	Mexico City, Mexico	–	50 km	DSQ
1991	Universiade	Sheffield, United Kingdom	—	20 km	DSQ
1992	Olympic Games	Barcelona, Spain	7th	20 km	1:25:35 hrs
1993	World Race Walking Cup	Monterrey, Mexico	1st	20 km	1:24:26 hrs
1993	Universiade	Buffalo, New York, United States	2nd	20 km	1:22:58
1993	World Championships	Stuttgart, Germany	—	20 km	DSQ
1993	Central American and Caribbean Games	Ponce, Puerto Rico	1st	20 km	1:26:22 hrs
1994	Ibero-American Championships	Mar del Plata, Argentina	1st	20 km	1:21:20.0
1995	World Race Walking Cup	Beijing, China	11th	20 km	1:22:34 hrs
1995	Pan American Games	Mar del Plata, Argentina	2nd	20 km	1:22:57 hrs
1995	World Championships	Gothenburg, Sweden	—	20 km	DSQ
1995	World Student Games	Fukuoka, Japan	1st	20 km	1:24:11 hrs
1996	Pan American Race Walking Cup	Manaus, Brazil	1st	20 km	1:27:29
1996	Olympic Games	Atlanta, United States	19th	20 km	1:24:10 hrs
1996	Olympic Games	Atlanta, United States	9th	50 km	3:50:05 hrs PB
1997	World Race Walking Cup	Poděbrady, Czech Republic	2nd	20 km	1:18:27 hrs PB
1997	World Championships	Athens, Greece	1st	20 km	1:21:43 hrs
1998	Central American and Caribbean Games	Maracaibo, Venezuela	1st	20 km	1:23:32 hrs
1999	World Race Walking Cup	Mézidon-Canon, France	5th	20 km	1:21:31 hrs
1999	Pan American Games	Winnipeg, Canada	2nd	20 km	1:20:28 hrs
1999	World Championships	Seville, Spain	3rd	20 km	1:24:31 hrs
2000	Olympic Games	Sydney, Australia	12th	20 km	1:22:05 hrs
2006	World Race Walking Cup	A Coruña, Spain	10th	20 km	1:20:52 hrs
2007	World Championships	Osaka, Japan	—	20 km	DSQ
2008	World Race Walking Cup	Cheboksary, Russia	18th	50 km	3:53:42 hrs

^{*}: Started as a guest out of competition.
