= Stina Lundberg Dabrowski =

Talk show host

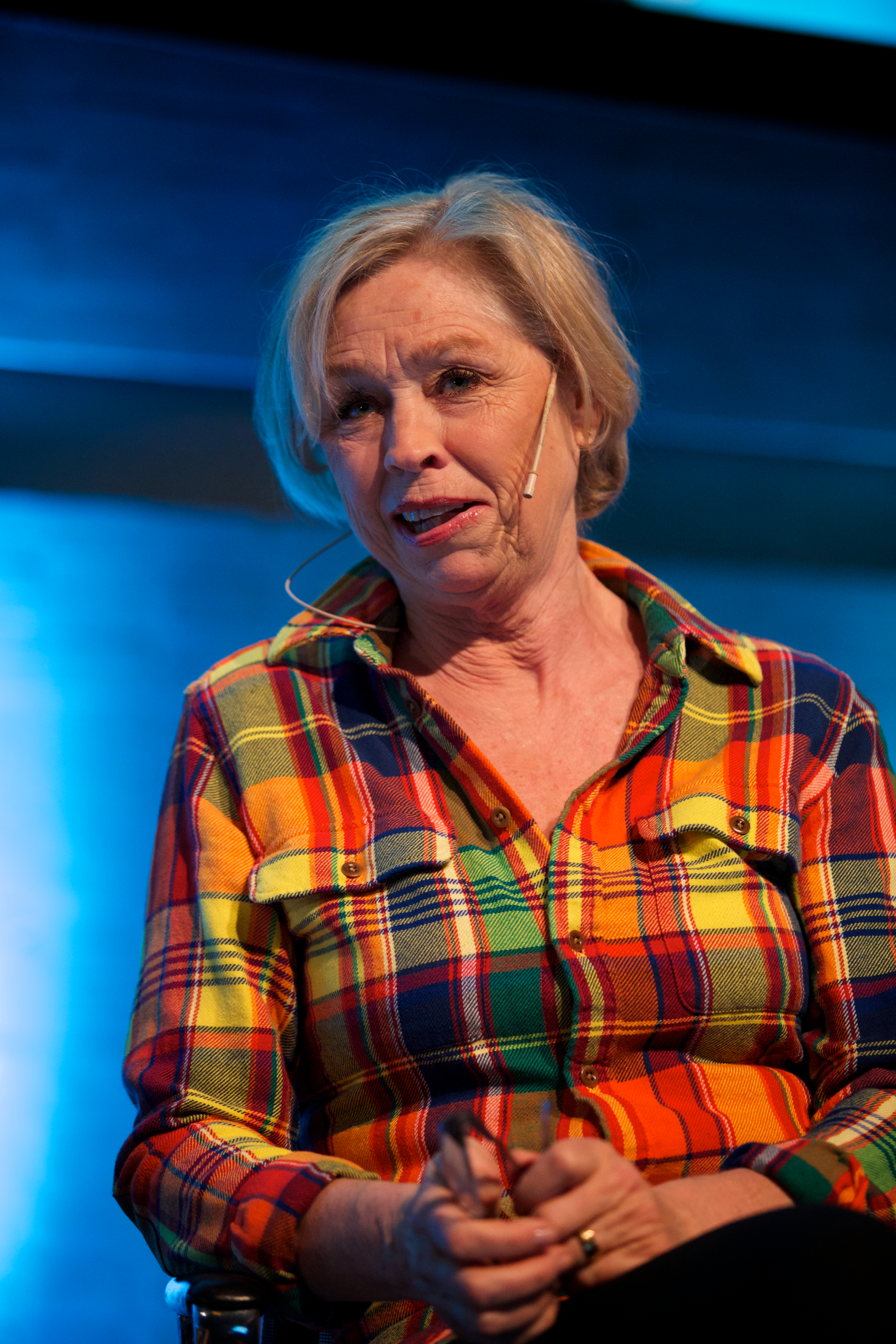
- Stina Lundberg Dabrowski in May 2014
- Born: 3 December 1950 (age 75); Örebro, Sweden
- Education: Stockholm University; Swedish Institute of Dramatic Art
- Occupations: TV presenter; Producer; Journalist; Writer; Professor
- Employer: Sveriges Television (SVT)
- Known for: Numerous talkshows
- Spouse: Kjell Dabrowski (m. 1988)
- Children: 4

Stina Lundberg Dabrowski (born 3 December 1950) is a Swedish journalist, television host, producer, writer, and professor of television production. She has interviewed many international leaders, politicians, and celebrities. She has been a fixture on Swedish television since 1982, when she got her start as co-host on the variety show Nöjesmaskinen, together with Sven Melander. Her interviews and programs with Margaret Thatcher, Nelson Mandela, Hillary Clinton, Yasser Arafat, King Abdullah of Jordan, Madonna, Clint Eastwood, and Tom Hanks have been seen by many millions in Scandinavia and Europe.

== Career ==
Stina Lundberg Dabrowski began her education in 1973 at Journalisthögskolan (The Department of Journalism, Media and Communication at Stockholm University). She attended the radio department of the Swedish Institute of Dramatic Art from 1979 to 1981. During her studies, she worked as a freelance reporter for Swedish outlets such as the radio programme Dagens Eko and the daily paper Aftonbladet.

In 1982, Dabrowski became co-host of the popular variety show Nöjesmaskinen on Swedish National Television. Her co-host was Swedish celebrity Sven Melander. Between 1985 and 1986, Dabrowski was host of the television programs Magasinet and 20:00. She has also hosted programs for Sweden's TV4 and TV3. She has produced many of her own programs through her company, Stina Lundberg Produktion, as well as being produced by Dabrowski TV, owned by her husband and fellow journalist Kjell Dabrowski.

She has later been engaged in the issue of age discrimination of women in the television branch.

== Interviews and documentaries ==
Dabrowski has traveled the world, interviewing Muammar al-Gaddafi, Yasser Arafat, Hillary Clinton, Margaret Thatcher, the Dalai Lama, Nelson Mandela, Diego Maradona, Benazir Bhutto, and Arnold Schwarzenegger. She has also interviewed entertainers and cultural personalities, notably Madonna, whom Dabrowski asked point-blank in 1994 how many abortions she had had. Dabrowski has produced and hosted many documentaries and reports. Several have been controversial, such as an in-depth look at a family who are members of the Ku Klux Klan in the USA. She has made documentaries about Cuba and Colombia, as well as a unique interview with Subcomandante Marcos and a program about the Zapatist guerillas in Mexico. She has led several political debates in Sweden during election years and hosted current events programs such as Debatt on Sveriges Television (2008).

=== The Stina jump ===
Dabrowski is known for her trademark in which the guests jump at the end of each program. The jump is frozen in mid-air and shown with the end credits after each interview. Many guests, including the Dalai Lama, jumped for Stina. Madonna, Margaret Thatcher, Benazir Bhutto, and Nelson Mandela were the only guests to decline the jump.

== Awards ==
Dabrowski has been awarded Sweden's top journalism accolades through the years. In 1991, she received Stora Journalistpriset (The Great Journalism Award) and she has been named "most influential journalist" and "most popular TV personality" by several of the largest Swedish newspapers. In 2005, Swedish TV program Folktoppen polled the Swedish public and Dabrowski was voted "best TV host of all time".

== Author and professor ==
Stina Lundberg Dabrowski's book Stinas Möten was published in 2006. It contains personal accounts and behind-the-scenes stories from some of her most memorable interviews such as Nelson Mandela and Governor Arnold Schwarzenegger. Her first book, Dabrowski möter sju kvinnor, was published in 1993.

In 2008, she became a professor of television production at The University College of Film, Radio, Television and Theatre in Stockholm.

== Interviews ==
- Astrid Lindgren
- Leonard Cohen
- Hillary Clinton
- Al Gore
- Nelson Mandela
- Arnold Schwarzenegger
- Dalai Lama
- King Hussein of Jordan
- King Abdullah and Queen Rania of Jordan
- Margaret Thatcher
- Mikhail Gorbachev
- Muammar al-Gaddafi
- Yasser Arafat
- Madeleine Albright
- Tariq Aziz
- Norman Schwarzkopf
- Benazir Bhutto, Pakistan
- Subcomandante Marcos, Mexico
- Ingmar Bergman
- Giorgio Armani
- George Soros
- Queen Silvia of Sweden
- Queen Margarethe of Denmark
- Erik Penser
- Jan Stenbeck
- Peter Wallenberg
- Dolly Parton
- Jane Fonda
- Elton John
- Bette Midler
- Eddie Izzard
- Mel Gibson
- Clint Eastwood
- Tom Hanks
- Richard Gere
- David Bowie
- Phil Collins
- Mia Farrow
- Madonna
- Diego Maradona
- Lisa Marie Presley
- Norman Mailer
