= Lisa Siwe =

Swedish director (born 1968)

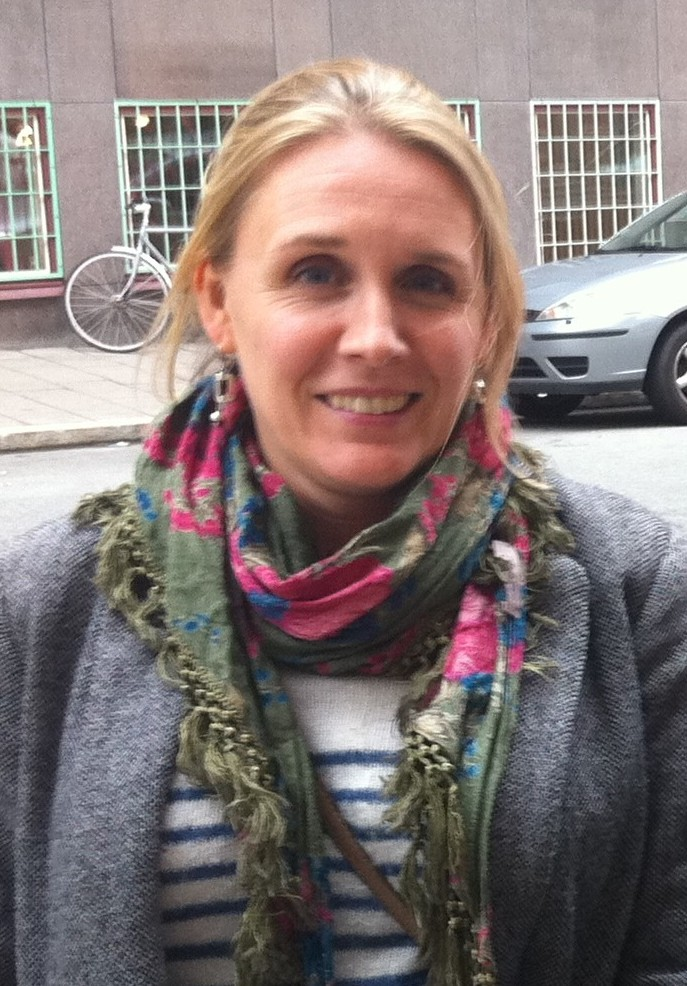
- Siwe in 2011
- Born: 1968 (age 56–57); Tynnered, Sweden
- Occupation: Director

Lisa Siwe (Swedish pronunciation: [ˈsîːvɛ]; born 1968) is a Swedish director from Tynnered, Gothenburg.

She was born in 1968 in Tynnered. She studied directing at Dramatiska Institutet in Stockholm and graduated in 1999. As part of her studies there, Siwe directed the 30-minute short film Födelsedagar och andra katastrofer (starring Swedish actress Sissela Kyle). It was well received and won her many awards, both in and outside of Sweden.

As a result, she was able to get a job at the production studio Madstone Pictures in New York City. Siwe was hired along with three other directors, and the studio's plan was that each would direct their own film. However, only one was able to follow through because he had already begun working on his project before he got the job at Madstone. Although Siwe felt that she learned a lot while working at the studio, she decided to return to Sweden to further her career.

After reading the 2003 novel I taket lyser stjärnorna, Siwe was inspired to adapt it as a film. She approached Linn Gottfridsson, a friend she had met at Dramatiska Institutet, about the idea. They decided the Siwe should direct the film and Gottfridsson should write the screenplay. Once they had acquired the rights from the author of the novel, production began.

The film, distributed internationally as Glowing Stars, was released in Sweden on 30 January 2009. It marked Siwe's feature-length film debut. Glowing Stars was critically acclaimed and won several awards. Among these, Siwe won a Guldbagge Award, the most prestigious film award in Sweden, in the "Best Director" category.

Recently, she directed Modus (TV series) for SvTV, which had the largest TV audience in Swedish TV history on its premiere. 'The second season was designated as Modus 2.

As of 2010, she was living in Södermalm in Stockholm.
