= Athletics at the 1991 Summer Universiade – Men's 20 kilometres walk =

The men's 20 kilometres walk event at the 1991 Summer Universiade was held at the Don Valley Stadium in Sheffield, South Yorkshire, England, on 23 July 1991.

== Results ==
| Rank | Athlete | Nationality | Time | Notes |
|---|---|---|---|---|
| 1st place, gold medalist(s) | Robert Korzeniowski | Poland | 1:24:37 | |
| 2nd place, silver medalist(s) | Jaime Barroso | Spain | 1:25:01 | |
| 3rd place, bronze medalist(s) | Arturo Di Mezza | Italy | 1:25:09 | |
| 4 | Štefan Malík | Czechoslovakia | 1:25:37 | |
| 5 | Jesús Ángel García | Spain | 1:26:17 | |
| 6 | Steven Beecroft | Australia | 1:26:33 | |
| 7 | Sergey Pershin | Soviet Union | 1:27:41 | |
| 8 | Bernardo Segura | Mexico | 1:28:10 | |
| 9 | Andreas Luttmann | Germany | 1:28:12 | |
| 10 | Dave McGovern | United States | 1:29:27 | |
| 11 | Volkmar Scholz | Germany | 1:31:15 | |
| 12 | Martin Engelsuiken | Norway | 1:34:05 | |
| 13 | Anders Myking | Norway | 1:36:38 | |
| 14 | Trond Moretro | Norway | 1:38:05 | |
| 15 | Belén Andablo | Mexico | 1:46:42 | |
| | Doug Fournier | United States | DQ | |
| | Walter Arena | Italy | DQ | |
| | Daniel García | Mexico | DQ | |
| | Aleksandr Sokolovskiy | Soviet Union | DQ | |
