= Tynnered =

- Interactive map of Tynnered
- Coordinates: 57°39′N 11°53′E
- Country: Sweden
- Province: Västergötland
- County: Västra Götaland County
- Municipality: Gothenburg Municipality

Area
  - Total: 29.85 km^{2} (11.53 sq mi)

Population (2010)
  - Total: 27,787
- Time zone: UTC+1 (CET)
  - Summer (DST): UTC+2 (CEST)
- Website: Official website

Tynnered is one of 21 boroughs in the city of Gothenburg, Sweden. It is located in the western part of the city, about 8-10 kilometres from the inner city, and it has a population of 27,787 (2010) on 29.85 square kilometres (11.53 mi^{2}). Alike several other boroughs of the city, Tynnered has a fairly high percentage of immigrants. On January 1, 2011, Tynnered became part of the district (stadsdelsnämnd) Western Gothenburg (Västra Göteborg). In 2021 the stadsdelsnämd districts were replaced by larger stadsområde districts and Tynnered became part of South-West Gothenburg (Sydväst Göteborg).

Travelling by tram from Gothenburg city centre to southern Tynnered takes about 25 minutes. The two trams that go to Tynnered are the tram routes 1 and 7, and they stop at Briljantgatan, Smaragdgatan and Opaltorget. To northern Tynnered the bus number 50 is the fastest, taking about 20 minutes from the city centre. The shopping mall Frölunda Torg is located a couple of minutes away from Tynnered when going by foot.

Tynnered is also a parish, with approximately the same area. The church was built 1973.

== History ==
In the middle of the 60's, the area around Opaltorget and several other apartment blocks in Tynnered were started to be built. This venture, which is called Million Programme (Miljonprogrammet), was made in order to furbish up the area and make it more friendly to live in.

During the fall 2009, the local district publicly published new plans for Tynnered. Approximately 500-600 new apartments, premises for shops and refurbishing of streets are included in the project. Opaltorget is also to be developed into a vibrant town square for service and local shopping. One of the reasons to this project is that Opaltorget has been seen as an unsafe and dark square, according to Gothenburg municipality. Later in the same year, the real estate committee approved of the proposal. The project is expected to start being built in 2013.

In its 2017 report, Tynnered was classified as a särskilt utsatt område (especially vulnerable area) by the Swedish Police. However, according to the 2021 report, its classification was improved to a risk area.

== Demographics ==
The population has increased with only circa 500 people the last ten years. In Tynnered, almost 34% of the inhabitants are younger than 25 years old. That percentage is much higher compared to the average in the city of Gothenburg. In principle have the inhabitants of Tynnered generally work, income and health like the rest of the people in Gothenburg. Due to the lack of workplaces in the borough, most employees work in other parts of the city. The turnout during Swedish general election 2006 was higher than in Gothenburg in general.

== Education ==
The following six schools are located in Tynnered:

- Tynneredsskolan
- Kannebäcksskolan
- Grevegårdsskolan
- Ängåsskolan
- Vättnedalsskolan
- Drakbergsskolan

During 2005 the percentage of students who continued with tertiary education was notably lower compared to the average in Gothenburg. However, 89% of the students had eligibility to gymnasium as of 2010. There are a number of kindergartens in Tynnered.
