= Tomáš Kratochvíl =

Czech race walker

Personal information
- National team: Czech Republic
- Born: December 19, 1971 (age 53) Prague, Czechoslovak Socialist Republic

Sport
- Country: Czech Republic
- Sport: Race walking
- Event: 20 kilometres race walk
- Club: USK Praha

Achievements and titles
- National finals: (gold) 1997 20 km Czech Race Walking Championship

Tomáš Kratochvíl (born 19 December 1971, in Prague) is a retired Czech race walker who represented the club USK Praha. In 1995 he participated at the 1995 World Championships (20 km), but was disqualified. He also finished 34th at the 1995 IAAF World Race Walking Cup. In 1996 he finished 48th at the 1996 Olympic Games (20 km). He also competed at the 1997 IAAF World Race Walking Cup. He became Czech champion in 1997 (20 km).
