= Denis Langlois (race walker) =

French race walker

Denis Langlois (French pronunciation: [dəni lɑ̃ɡlwa]; born 10 December 1968 in Drancy) is a French race walker.

== International competitions ==
Year	Competition	Venue	Position	Event	Notes
Representing France
1993	World Race Walking Cup	Monterrey, Mexico	19th	20 km	1:28:11
1993	World Championships	Stuttgart, Germany	21st	20 km	1:28:02
1994	European Indoor Championships	Paris, France	3rd	5000 m	18:43.20
1994	European Championships	Helsinki, Finland	15th	20 km	1:25:12
1995	World Race Walking Cup	Beijing, PR China	16th	20 km	1:23:13
1995	World Championships	Gothenburg, Sweden	7th	20 km	1:22:21
1996	Olympic Games	Atlanta, United States	14th	20 km	1:23:08
1997	World Championships	Athens, Greece	17th	20 km	1:25:27
1998	European Championships	Budapest, Hungary	7th	20 km	1:23.02
1999	World Championships	Seville, Spain	13th	20 km	1:26:25
2000	European Race Walking Cup	Eisenhüttenstadt, Germany	3rd	50 km	3:47:38
2000	Olympic Games	Sydney, Australia	14th	50 km	3:52:56
2001	European Race Walking Cup	Dudince, Slovakia	5th	50 km	3:48:06
2001	World Championships	Edmonton, Canada	11th	50 km	3:53:42
2001	Jeux de la Francophonie	Ottawa-Hull, Canada	2nd	20 km	1:23:21
2002	World Race Walking Cup	Turin, Italy	6th	50 km	3:51:32
2002	European Championships	Munich, Germany	6th	50 km	3:50:47
2003	World Championships	Paris, France	10th	50 km	3:49:05
2004	Olympic Games	Athens, Greece	—	50 km	DNF
2005	World Championships	Helsinki, Finland	14th	50 km	3:59:31
2005	Jeux de la Francophonie	Niamey, Niger	1st	20 km	1:30:47
2006	European Championships	Gothenburg, Sweden	10th	20 km	1:24:06
