= Madrid Marcha =

Racewalking competition in Spain

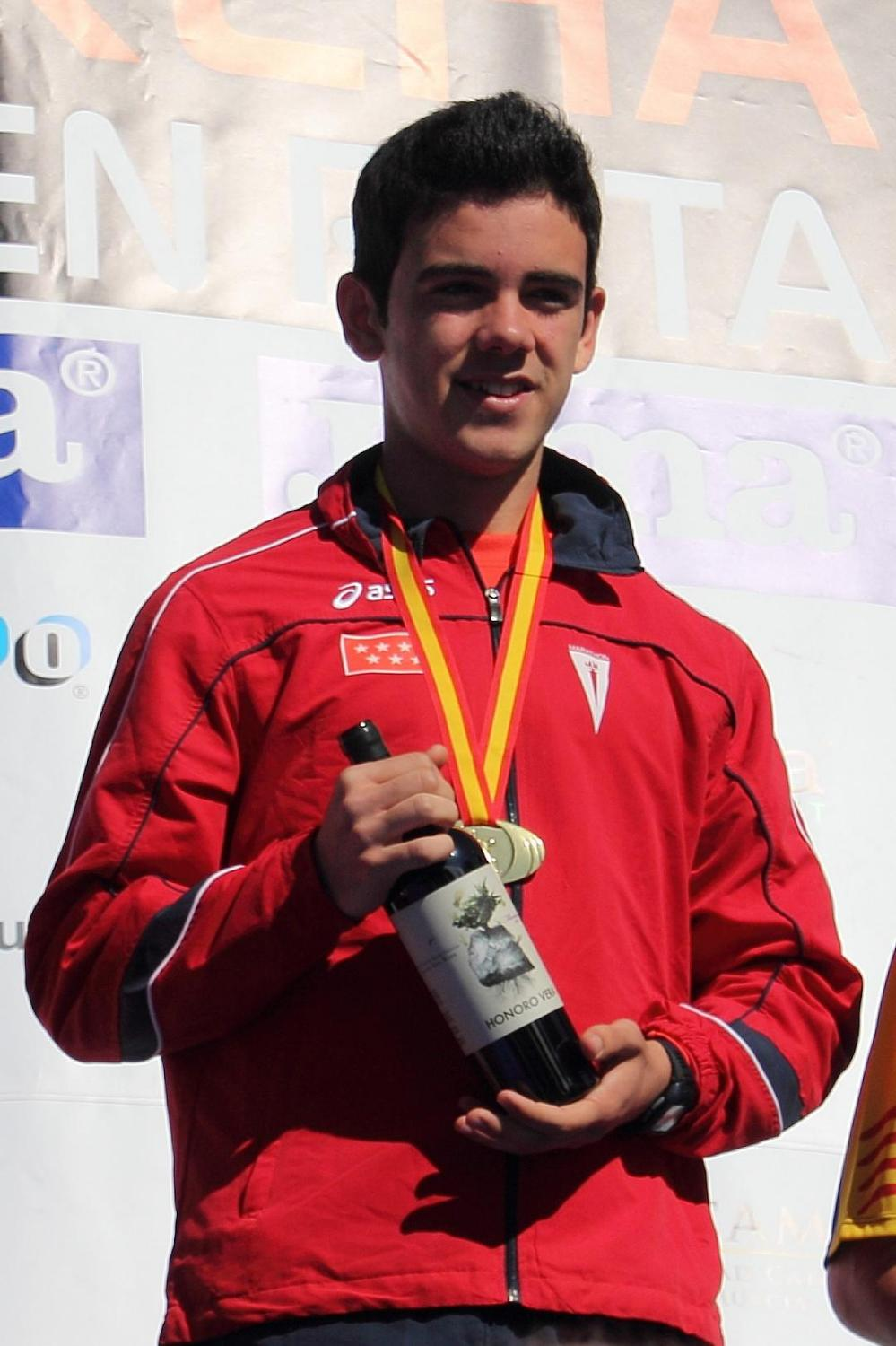
- Diego García Carrera, who organizes the race
- Location: Madrid, Spain
- Event type: Race walking
- World Athletics Cat.: A (World Athletics Race Walking Tour Gold)
- Distance: 10 km walk (2022–present)
- Established: 2022

The Madrid Marcha, officially the Gran Premio Internacional Finetwork Madrid Marcha, is an annual race walking competition held in Madrid, Spain. As of 2024, it is a World Athletics Race Walking Tour Gold level meeting – the highest-level circuit of international race walking competitions.

The meeting is organized by the Royal Spanish Athletics Federation and Diego García Carrera.

== History ==
The race was founded in 2022, organized by Diego García Carrera. It is one of several high-level racewalking competitions in Spain including Gran Premio Cantones de A Coruña de Marcha, inspired by the success of Spanish racewalkers at international athletics championships.

The course crosses San Bernardo and Fuencarral and finishes with an uphill to Callao Square. As of 2023, it is broadcast live on LaLiga+.

== Winners ==
Madrid Marcha senior race winners
Ed.	Date	Men's 10 km walk		Women's 10 km walk		R
Ed.	Date	Winner	Time	Winner	Time	R
1st	16 May 2022	Perseus Karlström (SWE)	38:42	Qieyang Shijie (CHN)	43:07	
2nd	30 Apr 2023	Francesco Fortunato (ITA)	38:56	Yang Jiayu (CHN)	43:20	
