= In the Ceiling the Stars Are Shining =

2003 novel by Johanna Thydell

- First edition
- Author: Johanna Thydell
- Original title: I taket lyser stjärnorna
- Language: Swedish
- Subject: children and death
- Genre: children
- Published: 2003
- Publisher: Natur & Kultur
- Publication place: Sweden
- Awards: August Prize of 2003

In the Ceiling the Stars Are Shining (orig. Swedish I taket lyser stjärnorna, literal translation) is a Swedish novel by Johanna Thydell, published in 2003. The book is about thirteen-year-old Jenna Wilson, who is unpopular at school and whose mother is dying of breast cancer. The book won the prestigious August Prize as the best Swedish children's and youth's book of 2003.

A film adaptation, Glowing Stars, was released in 2009.
