= Anno 1790 =

- Genre: Crime; Historical Drama
- Written by: Jonas Frykberg
- Directed by: Rickard Petrolius
- Starring: Peter Eggers Joel Spira
- Country of origin: Sweden
- No. of episodes: 10

Production
- Producers: Johan Mardell; Rolf Sohlman; Lisa Dahlberg.
- Production locations: Kumla, Stockholm
- Cinematography: Geir Hartly Andreassen
- Running time: 60 min.
- Production companies: Pampas Produktion; Sveriges Television; YLE; TV2 Norge; DR; ARD

Original release
- Network: SVT1

Anno 1790 is a Swedish historic crime drama starring Peter Eggers, Joel Spira and Linda Zilliacus. The ten episodes were broadcast on SVT in the autumn of 2011.

== Concept ==
The series is based on an original idea by executive producer Johan Mardell and lead writer Jonas Frykberg. Richard Petrelius directed most episodes, aided by Levan Akin and Christina Humle. The Guldbagge Award-winning cinematographer Geir Hartly Andreassen was also signed on to the project . The main scriptwriter was Jonas Frykberg. He worked with Sara Heldt and Alex Haridi.

== Plot summary ==
The main character is Johan Gustav Dåådh (Peter Eggers) a former army physician from the Russo-Swedish War (1788–1790), now criminal inspector in Stockholm. He is inspired by the French Revolution and the new ideas of his time. He is an atheist and a strong supporter of republicanism, and he has embraced Voltaire's philosophy. He has also fallen in love with Magdalena, wife of his superior, Walhstedt. Magdalena shares Dåådh's worldview. Dåådh struggles with seeking to change the world while influencing his revolutionary friends to refrain from violence.

Inspector Dåådh's assistant is Simon Freund, portrayed by Joel Spira. Simon Freund is in many ways Inspector Dåådh's opposite, being a more conservative man with a strong faith in God, though he does have a bad habit of drinking.

== Cast ==
- Peter Eggers – Johan Gustav Dåådh
- Joel Spira – Simon Freund
- Linda Zilliacus – Magdalena Wahlstedt
- Johan H:son Kjellgren – Carl Fredrik Wahlstedt
- Richard Turpin – Olof Nordin
- Josef Säterhagen – Erik Raxelius
- Cecilia Nilsson – Gustava Pettersson
- Jessica Zandén – Greta Ekman
- Thorsten Flinck – Henrik Emanuel Odenstein
- Cecilia Forss – Cajsa Stina Berg
- Philip Zandén – Claes von Graz

== Production ==
Production on the series started in September 2010. Most scenes were filmed in an abandoned hangar converted into a studio, located in a quarry outside Kumla. Several scenes were shot in Gamla stan (Old Town), the historic quarter of Stockholm.

The series was shot using Arriflex Alexa, a film-style digital motion picture camera similar to Red One.

=== Episodes ===
1. Between Blood and Lilacs
  - Johan Gustav Dåådh, an army surgeon returned from war, is escorting a patient, Simon Freund, home to Stockholm when he is offered the post of police commissioner. Initially reluctant, he is smitten with the chief constable's wife, Magdalena, and, at her request, accepts the offer. He takes Freund as his assistant.
2. The Perfumed Pistol
  - A shop owner is found dead with a knife in his chest. A man is caught apparently red-handed, but Dåådh has questions.
3. Fickle Woman
  - Dåådh goes to question a man printing radical pamphlets, but finds him with his skull crushed in his own printing press.
4. Good Evening, Beautiful Mask!
  - Dåådh is under pressure to find a masked and dangerous burglar. He is offered help by the hypnotist Cagliostri.
5. The Wages of Sin Is Death
  - A bomb explodes in a crowded coffee house. Dåådh, however, is ordered to interrupt his investigation to stop a pietist church service, which Freund regularly attends. Then, a respected pastor of the state church is found burned to death.
6. A Toast to the Scaffold
  - An old comrade of Dåådh's is charged with treason and executed in the town square. By royal order, his body is sent for dissection, but on the way it disappears and its escorts are found murdered.
7. The Blind Hand of Fate
  - A child's dead body is found in a pile of dung amid the excrement and rubbish on Stockholm's shoreline. More bodies are found. Dåådh's investigation leads to the Great Orphanage and the drawing of the Number Lottery, whose sponsor is a friend of the King and therefore unimpeachable.
8. The Die Is Cast
  - A landowner is found dead, kicked to death by his horse. Dåådh determines it was murder, but finds little evidence and no shortage of suspects. The chief constable demands a quick result.
9. The Voices of the Dead
  - Dåådh is called to Uppsala by his former professor to solve a murder there. But he soon finds his own life is in danger.
10. A Different Kingdom
  - In his absence, the situation in Stockholm has become dangerous. Freund goes missing, and enemies on two sides are closing in on Dåådh. He is forced to rethink his decision to stay.

== Home video ==
The series was released on DVD in 2012.
