= Ricardo Pueyo =

Spanish racewalker

Ricard Pueyo
Personal information
- Full name: Ricard Pueyo Ministral
- Nationality: Spanish
- Born: 1 March 1967 Tiana, Spain
- Height: 1.72 m (5 ft 8 in)
- Weight: 61 kg (134 lb)

Sport
- Sport: Athletics
- Event: Racewalking

Ricard Pueyo Ministral (born 1 March 1967) is a Spanish racewalker. He competed in the men's 20 kilometres walk at the 1988 Summer Olympics.
