= Stefan Johansson (race walker) =

Swedish racewalker (born 1967)

Jan Bengt Stefan Johansson (born April 11, 1967 in Falkenberg, Halland) is a retired male race walker from Sweden. He twice competed for his native country at the Summer Olympics: in 1988 and 1992. Johansson set his personal best (3:53.34) in the men's 50 km walk event in 1988.

== Achievements ==
Year	Competition	Venue	Position	Event	Notes
Representing Sweden
1985	World Race Walking Cup	St John's, Isle of Man	30th	20 km	1:30:23
1986	World Junior Championships	Athens, Greece	6th	10,000m	41:27.13
1986	European Championships	Stuttgart, West Germany	13th	20 km	1:28:03
1987	World Race Walking Cup	New York City, United States	26th	20 km	1:24:48
1987	World Championships	Rome, Italy	23rd	20 km	1:27:27
1988	Olympic Games	Seoul, South Korea	25th	20 km	1:23:51
1988	Olympic Games	Seoul, South Korea	20th	50 km	3:53:34
1989	World Race Walking Cup	L'Hospitalet, Spain	13th	50 km	3:56:47
1990	European Championships	Split, Yugoslavia	—	50 km	DNF
1991	World Indoor Championships	Seville, Spain	–	5000 m	DQ
1991	World Race Walking Cup	San Jose, United States	—	50 km	DNF
1991	World Championships	Tokyo, Japan	30th	20 km	1:29:47
1992	European Indoor Championships	Genoa, Italy	3rd	5000 m	18:27.95
1992	Olympic Games	Barcelona, Spain	15th	20 km	1:28:37
1992	Olympic Games	Barcelona, Spain	11th	50 km	3:58:56
1993	World Indoor Championships	Toronto, Canada	8th	5000 m	20:30.32
1993	World Race Walking Cup	Monterrey, Mexico	—	20 km	DNF
1993	World Championships	Stuttgart, Germany	22nd	20 km	1:28:02
1994	European Championships	Helsinki, Finland	—	20 km	DNF
1994	European Championships	Helsinki, Finland	18th	50 km	4:00:18
1995	World Race Walking Cup	Beijing, PR China	42nd	20 km	1:16:14
1995	World Championships	Gothenburg, Sweden	18th	20 km	1:26:20
