= Robert Korzeniowski =

Polish racewalker (born 1968)

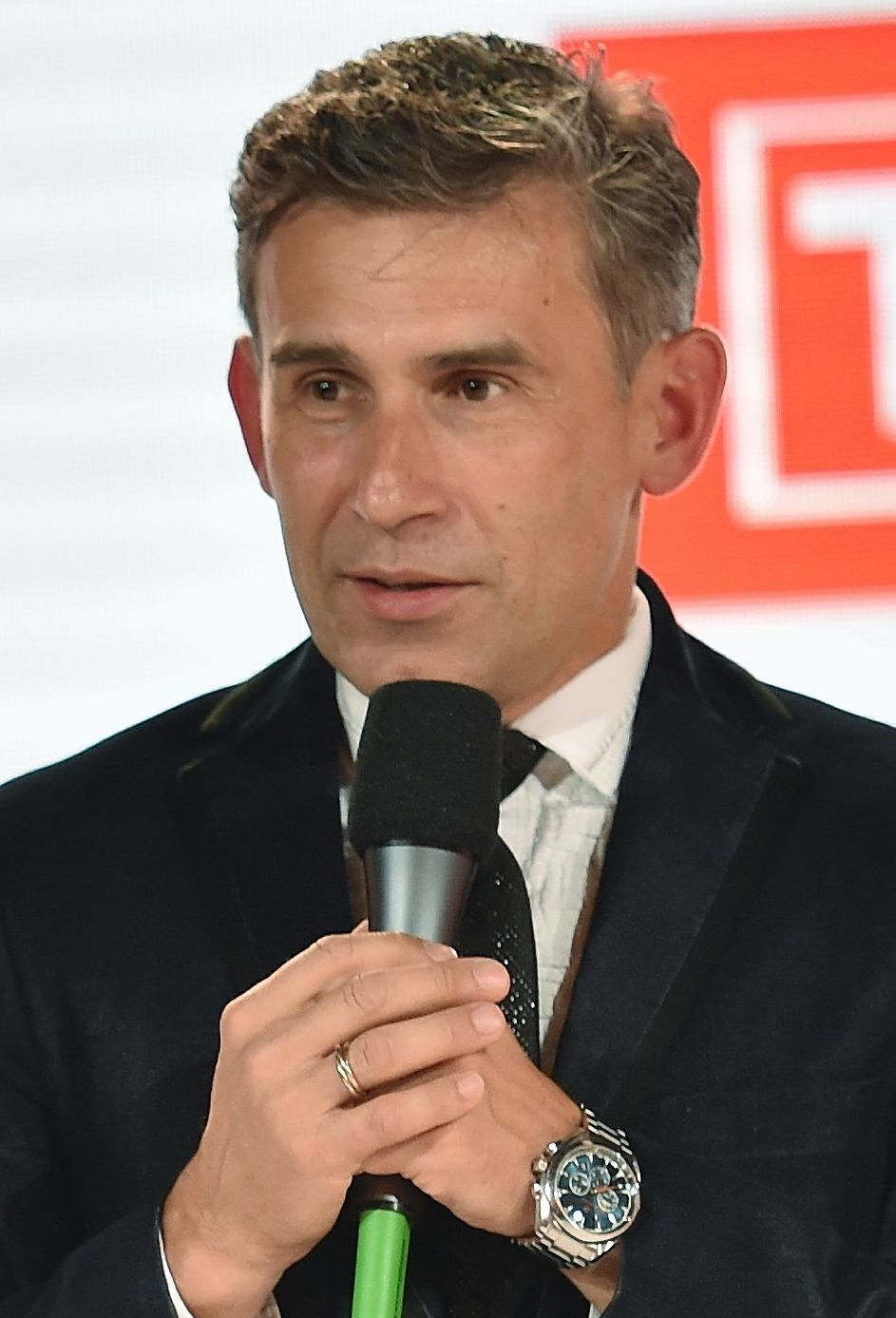
- Robert Korzeniowski in 2020

Personal information
- Full name: Robert Marek Korzeniowski
- Born: 30 July 1968 (age 58) Lubaczów, Poland
- Height: 168 cm (5 ft 6 in)
- Weight: 60 kg (132 lb)
Medal record
Men's athletics
Representing Poland
Event	1st	2nd	3rd
Olympic Games	4	0	0
World Championships	3	0	1
World Indoor Championships	0	1	0
European Championships	2	0	0
Summer Universiade	2	0	0
Total	11	1	1
Olympic Games
Gold medal – first place	1996 Atlanta	50 km walk
Gold medal – first place	2000 Sydney	20 km walk
Gold medal – first place	2000 Sydney	50 km walk
Gold medal – first place	2004 Athens	50 km walk
World Championships
Gold medal – first place	1997 Athens	50 km walk
Gold medal – first place	2001 Edmonton	50 km walk
Gold medal – first place	2003 Paris	50 km walk
Bronze medal – third place	1995 Gothenburg	50 km walk
World Indoor Championships
Silver medal – second place	1993 Toronto	5000 m walk
European Championships
Gold medal – first place	1998 Budapest	50 km walk
Gold medal – first place	2002 Munich	50 km walk
Universiade
Gold medal – first place	1991 Sheffield	20 km walk
Gold medal – first place	1993 Buffalo	20 km walk

Robert Marek Korzeniowski (born 30 July 1968) is a Polish former racewalker who won four gold medals at the Olympic Games and three gold medals at World Championships.

== Biography ==
Korzeniowski was born in Lubaczów, and is the brother of fellow Olympic athlete Sylwia Korzeniowska.

== Career ==
Korzeniowski won three consecutive Olympic gold medals in the 50 km walk at Atlanta 1996, Sydney 2000, and Athens 2004.

In addition, he became the first athlete to win the gold medal in both the 50 km walk and 20 km walk at a single Olympic Games in Sydney.

He won World Championship titles in the 50 km walk at the 1997 World Championships, 2001 World Championships, and 2003 World Championships.

He also won European Championship twice in the 50 km walk in 1998 in Budapest and 2002 in Munich.

He is also the former world record holder in the 50 km walk from 2002 to 2006.

== Post-career ==
Korzeniowski retired after the 2004 Olympic Games and became actively involved in various roles at the International Olympic Committee.

He was the coach and mentor of former world record-holder Paquillo Fernández.

Since 2005 he worked for the public Polish Television (TVP) as a chief of sport department and in 2007 he became a General Manager of TVP Sport, a new specialized channel in Poland. On 6 November 2009, he announced his resignation.

In 2014 Korzeniowski was inducted into the International Association of Athletics Federations' Hall of Fame.

In 2022, the Korzeniowski Warsaw Race Walking Cup, an annual racewalking competition in Warsaw, was founded and named in his honor. Since 2022 it has been a World Athletics Race Walking Tour Gold level competition.

== State awards ==
For his sport achievements, Korzeniowski received the Order of Polonia Restituta:

- 1996 Knight's Cross (5th Class)
- 2000 Officer's Cross (4th Class)
- 2004 Commander's Cross (3rd Class)

== Competition record ==
Year	Competition	Venue	Position	Event	Notes
Representing Poland
1987	European Junior Championships	Birmingham, United Kingdom	–	10,000 m walk	DQ
1989	Universiade	Duisburg, West Germany	6th	20 km walk	1:26:10
1990	European Championships	Split, Yugoslavia	4th	20 km walk	1:23.47
1991	World Championships	Tokyo, Japan	10th	20 km walk	1:21:32
1991	World Championships	Tokyo, Japan	–	50 km walk	DNF
1992	Olympic Games	Barcelona, Spain	–	20 km walk	DNF
1992	Olympic Games	Barcelona, Spain	–	50 km walk	DQ
1993	World Indoor Championships	Toronto, Canada	2nd	5000 m walk	18:35.91
1993	Universiade	Buffalo, United States	1st	20 km walk	1:22:01
1993	World Championships	Stuttgart, Germany	–	50 km walk	DQ
1994	European Indoor Championships	Paris, France	–	5000 m walk	DQ
1994	European Championships	Helsinki, Finland	–	20 km walk	DQ
1994	European Championships	Helsinki, Finland	5th	50 km walk	3:45:57
1995	World Championships	Gothenburg, Sweden	3rd	50 km walk	3:45.57
1996	Olympic Games	Atlanta, United States	8th	20 km walk	1:21:13
1996	Olympic Games	Atlanta, United States	1st	50 km walk	3:43:30
1997	World Championships	Athens, Greece	1st	50 km walk	3:44:46
1998	European Championships	Budapest, Hungary	1st	50 km walk	3:43:51
1999	World Race Walking Cup	Mézidon-Canon, France	4th	20 km walk	1:20:52
1999	World Championships	Seville, Spain	–	50 km walk	DQ
2000	European Race Walking Cup	Eisenhüttenstadt, Germany	1st	20 km walk	1:18:29
2000	Olympic Games	Sydney, Australia	1st	20 km walk	1:18:59 (OR)
2000	Olympic Games	Sydney, Australia	1st	50 km walk	3:42:22
2001	World Championships	Edmonton, Canada	1st	50 km walk	3:42.08
2001	Goodwill Games	Brisbane, Australia	2nd	20,000 m walk	1:19:52.0
2002	European Championships	Munich, Germany	1st	50 km walk	3:36:39 (WR)
2003	World Championships	Paris, France	1st	50 km walk	3:36:03 (WR)
2004	Olympic Games	Athens, Greece	1st	50 km walk	3:38:46

== See also ==
- Polish records in athletics
- 2002 Race Walking Year Ranking

Records
Preceded by (Russia) Valeriy Spitsyn	Men's 50 km walk world record holder 8 August 2002 – 2 December 2006	Succeeded by (Australia) Nathan Deakes
