= Johanna Thydell =

Swedish writer

- Born: 14 November 1980 (age 45); Nässjö, Sweden
- Occupation: writer
- Writing career
- Language: Swedish
- Period: 2003–
- Genre: children-youth
- Notable work: In the Ceiling the Stars Are Shining (2003)

Johanna Thydell, born 14 November 1980 in Nässjö, Sweden is a Swedish writer. Her 2003 book In the Ceiling the Stars Are Shining was given the Swedish August Prize.

Born in Nässjö, she grew up in Värnamo. After secondary school, she attended a writer's course, and got in contact with writer Magnus Utvik, who assisted her in becoming a writer. She was a 2004 Sommar host. She studied at the writer's line course at Fridhems Folk High School in Svalöv and culture-courses focusing at literature and film at the Stockholm University.

== Bibliography ==
- 2003 – In the Ceiling the Stars Are Shining ("I taket lyser stjärnorna")
- 2006 – Det fattas en tärning
- 2010 – Ursäkta att man vill bli lite älskad
- 2012 – There's a Pig in my Class! ("Det är en gris på dagis")
- 2017 - Dumma teckning!

== Awards ==
- 2003 – Slangbellan
- 2003 – August Prize for In the Ceiling the Stars Are Shining
- 2003 – BMF Plaque
- 2007 – Partille Bookstore's Writer's Scholarship
- 2012 – BMF Plaque
