= Murders of Mohammed Ammouri and Anna-Lena Svensson =

2004 double murder in Linköping, Sweden

- Location: Linköping, Sweden
- Date: 19 October 2004; 22 years ago
- Attack type: Homicide by stabbing
- Deaths: 2
- Victims: Mohammed Ammouri, aged 8; Anna-Lena Svensson, aged 56
- Perpetrator: Daniel Nyqvist

The double murder of eight-year-old Mohammed Ammouri and 56-year-old Anna-Lena Svensson occurred on 19 October 2004 in Linköping, Sweden. Both were stabbed to death at Åsgatan in Linköping. The murders remained unsolved and with no suspects for 16 years, until the new method of ancestral DNA analysis was used. In June 2020, a suspect was arrested and later found guilty of the murders and sentenced to psychiatric care indefinitely. It was the first time in Swedish history that the method of ancestral DNA was used to solve any murder or other crime in Sweden.

== Investigation ==
Police secured the murder weapon and a cap worn by the killer and secured the male's DNA. From the DNA results it could be confirmed that the suspect was from Northern Europe, had blonde hair, and was a smoker and snus user at the time. Police also stated that they believed that the suspect was in his twenties and likely was suffering from mental health issues.

Alternative theories are that the murders were planned, in particular the murder of Mohammed Ammouri. This theory was brought out by crime professor Leif GW Persson and Hasse Aro. They also theorised that the suspect might not be mentally ill.

In 2010, a sketch of the suspect was revealed. The sketch and the case itself were brought up on the SVT crime show Veckans brott, and it was broadcast on the anniversary of the murders, 19 October 2010.

In 2018, the police released a second sketch of the suspect. This time it was created in the Netherlands based on the suspect's DNA profile, a technique tested for the first time in Sweden at the time. The sketch led to over 100 new tips from the public but no arrest.

The investigation into the double murders in Linköping was the second-largest in Swedish history, next to the investigation into the assassination of Prime Minister Olof Palme.

== Arrest and prosecution ==
On 9 June, 2020, sixteen years after the double murder, 37-year-old Daniel Nyqvist was arrested based on hits made in the commercial database of ancestorial DNA, combined with a family search of the person's DNA. The police were aided by professional ancestor scientist Peter Sjölund to help find the suspect's family tree.

A hit in the database of FamilyTreeDNA plus ancestor detective work by Sjölund back to the early 1800s provided enough information to give a certain hit.

They had luck when the DNA genealogy phase of the investigation had been going on for some time. A news reporter, Linda Hjertén, had learned that Peter Sjölund would like to see more people with origins in Östergötland submit their DNA to a DNA genealogy database, as it could help in the investigation. Hjertén did so and it turned out that she had quite a lot of DNA in common with the wanted perpetrator, which simplified the solving of the case. The perpetrator was the son of her first cousin, a relationship that on average means that you share 6.25% of your DNA.

Based on the familial results, Nyqvist's brother was also initially taken in for questioning. A DNA test was made after Daniel Nyqvist's arrest which showed a 100% match between his DNA and the DNA found at the crime scene. Daniel Nyqvist confessed to the double murders the same day as he was arrested.

On 1 October 2020, Nyqvist was found guilty and sentenced to psychiatric care indefinitely for the two murders. Nyqvist admitted in court that the two murders were unprovoked and that he heard voices that told him that he needed to kill someone. He first stabbed Mohammed Ammouri. When Anna-Lena happened to see the murder, he attacked her as well and stabbed her to death. He was also ordered to pay the family of the murdered 8-year-old 350.000 (SEK) and 1,4 million (SEK) to the Swedish state. Anna-Lena's family did not request any compensation during the trial.

On 7 October of the same year, Nyqvist through his attorney Johan Ritzer announced he would not appeal his sentence.

== Book ==
- Bodin, Anna; Sjölund, Peter (2021). Genombrottet: så löste släktforskaren dubbelmordet i Linköping. Stockholm: Norstedts. ISBN 978-91-1-311399-9.

== Media ==
The murders and subsequent investigation were the inspiration for the television drama series The Breakthrough which premiered on Netflix in January 2025.
