= Peter Eggers =

Swedish actor

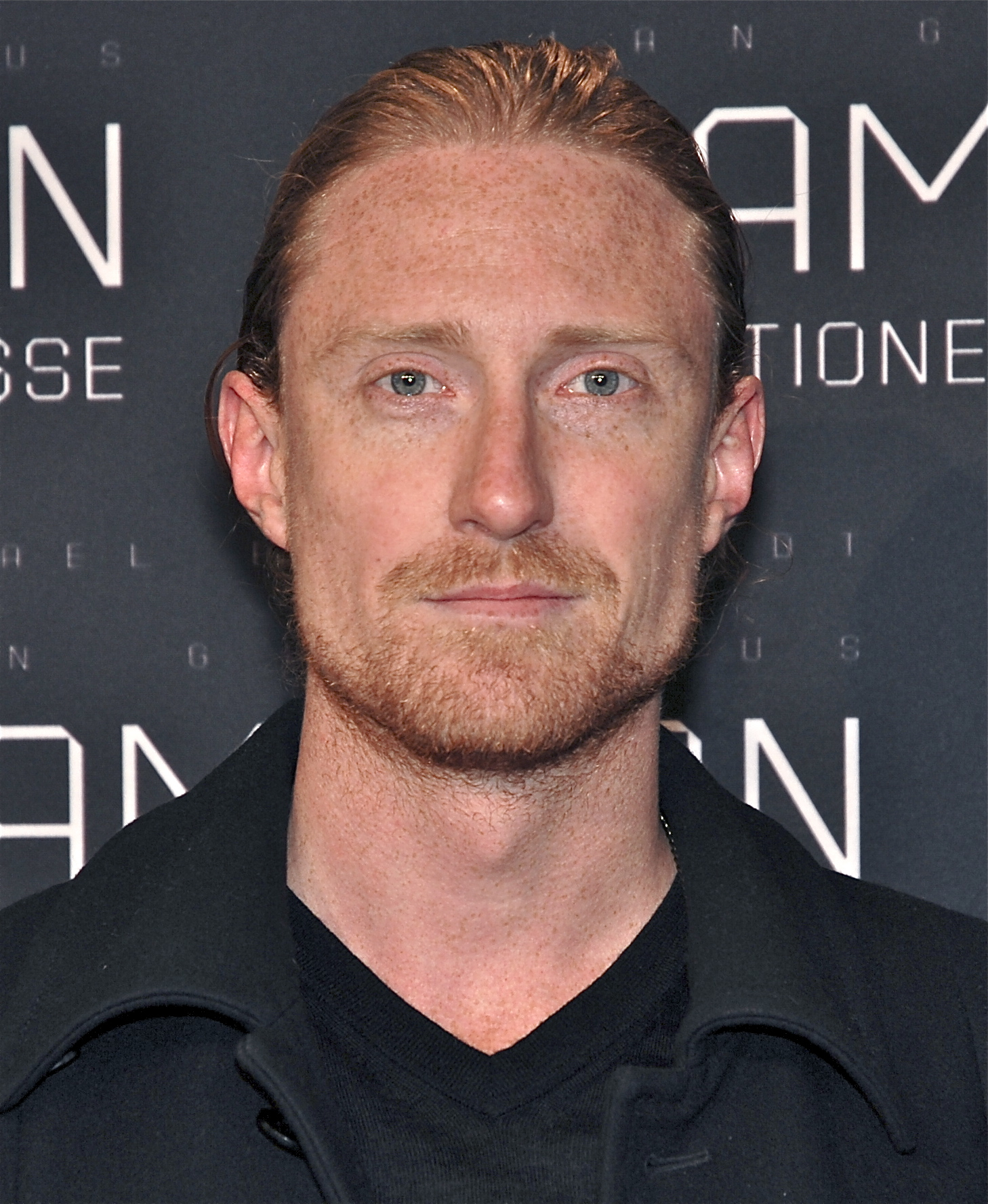
Peter Eggers in 2012

Peter Alex Tomas Eggers (born 1979 or 1980) is a Swedish actor, best known for his starring role in the 2011 TV series Anno 1790. He also plays the lead role in the 2025 Netflix series The Breakthrough.

== Early life and education ==
Peter Alex Tomas Eggers was born in 1979 or 1980 in Lund, Sweden.

== Selected filmography ==
- Evil (2003)
- Drowning Ghost (2004)

== Selected television ==
- Anno 1790 (2011)
- Blinded (2019)
- Snabba Cash (TV series) (2021-)
- The Breakthrough (TV series) (2025)
