= Korzeniowski Warsaw Race Walking Cup =

Annual racewalking competition in Warsaw, Poland

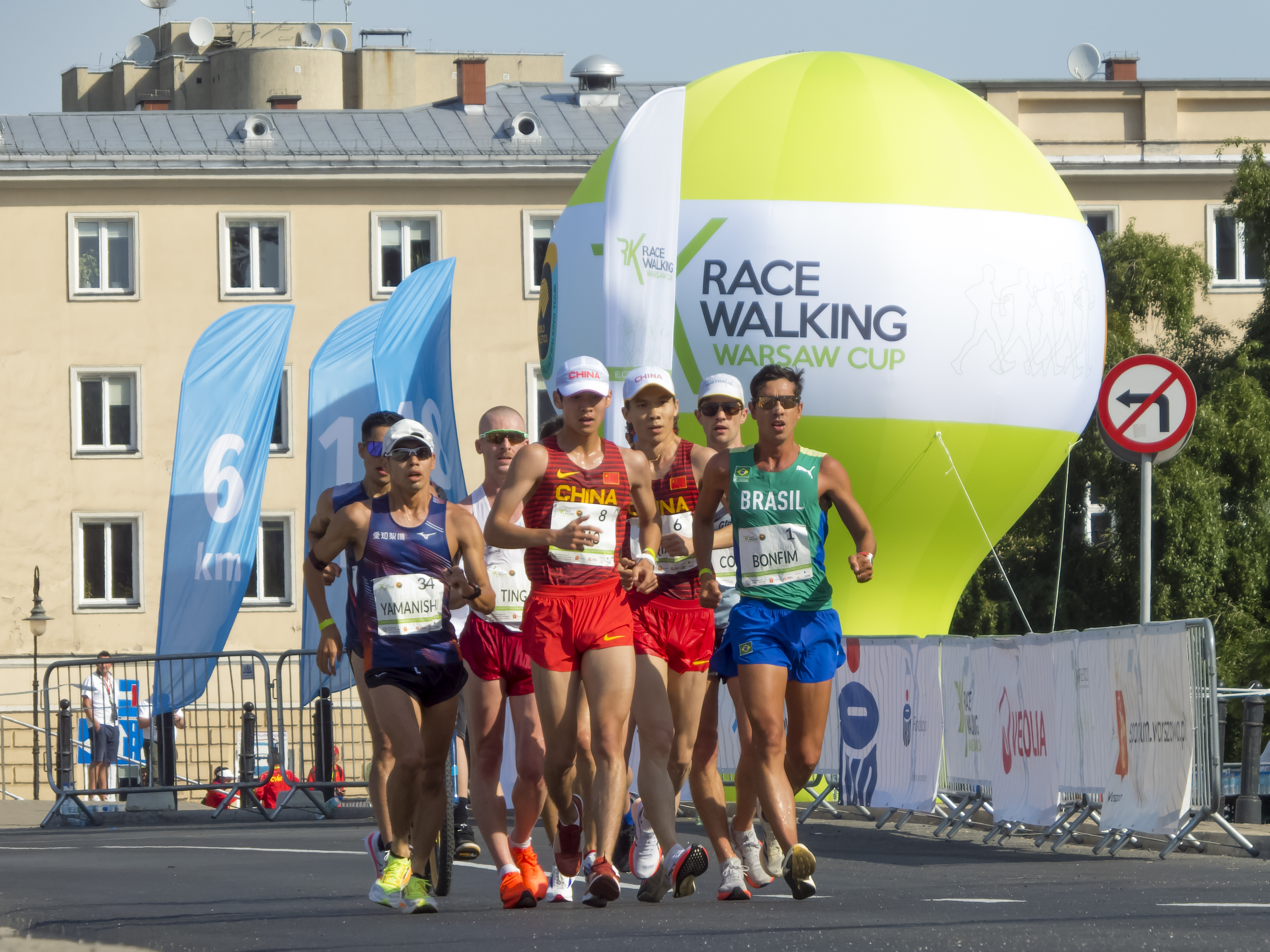
- Korzeniowski Warsaw Race Walking Cup 2024
- Location: Warsaw, Poland
- Event type: Race walking
- World Athletics Cat.: A (World Athletics Race Walking Tour Gold)
- Distance: 10 km walk (2022); 20 km walk (2023–present)
- Established: 2022

The Korzeniowski Warsaw Race Walking Cup is an annual race walking competition held in Warsaw, Poland. As of 2024, it is a World Athletics Race Walking Tour Gold level meeting – the highest-level circuit of international race walking competitions.

The meeting is organized by the Polish Athletic Association, and it is typically held in April or May.

== History ==
The race is named after Robert Korzeniowski, Olympic champion in racewalking from Poland. The first edition of the race was organized as a fundraiser for Ukrainian athletes in opposition to the 2022 Russian invasion of Ukraine. Although a 20 km walk was originally planned for 2022, only a 10 km walk for professionals was contested as a 20 km was contested two weeks later on the same course for the Polish Athletics Championships. From 2023 onwards, the featured race distance was 20 km, along with several shorter distances for youth and masters athletes.

== Winners ==
Korzeniowski Warsaw Race Walking Cup 20K race winners
Ed.	Date	Men's 20 km walk		Women's 20 km walk		R
Ed.	Date	Winner	Time	Winner	Time	R
1st	9 Apr 2022	Rafał Sikora (POL)	42:24.30 (10 km)	Katarzyna Zdziebło (POL)	45:10.15 (10 km)	
2nd	23 Apr 2023	Caio Bonfim (BRA)	1:19:42	Kimberly García (PER)	1:30:16	
3rd	5 May 2024	Qian Haifeng (CHN)	**1:19:05**	Liu Hong (CHN)	**1:27:33**	

Bold indicates meeting record
