= Igor Kollár =

Slovak racewalker (born 1965)

Personal information
- Born: 25 June 1965 (age 61) Žiar nad Hronom, Czechoslovakia
- Height: 176 cm (5 ft 9 in)
- Weight: 62 kg (137 lb)

Sport
- Club: Dukla Banská Bystrica; HITEC

Achievements and titles
- National finals: 1998 Slovak Champs; • 20km race walk, 1st (gold)

Igor Kollár (born 25 June 1965 in Žiar nad Hronom, Banská Bystrica Region) is a retired male race walker from Slovakia. He is a three-time Olympian.

At the 1996 Olympics, Kollár garnered a "huge lead" over the pack in the 20 km walk, but he was disqualified as the judges deemed that he held two feet off the ground. Kollár claimed that the judges disqualified him because he was so far ahead, and they just wanted a closer finish. Following the '96 Olympics, Kollár's performance lagged and he was eventually expelled from his Dukla Banská Bystrica club, with the club saying that he was "too old". In response, Kollár created his own club called HITEC and he continued to compete for several years, making a resurgence at the 1999 World Championships where he finished 6th.

== Achievements ==
Year	Competition	Venue	Position	Event	Notes
Representing Czechoslovakia
1991	World Championships	Tokyo, Japan	13th	20 km	1:21:44
1992	Olympic Games	Barcelona, Spain	19th	20 km	1:29:38
Representing Slovakia
1993	World Race Walking Cup	Monterrey, Mexico	9th	20 km	1:26:00
1993	World Championships	Stuttgart, Germany	8th	20 km	1:24:23
1994	European Championships	Helsinki, Finland	7th	20 km	1:22:23
1995	World Race Walking Cup	Beijing, PR China	19th	20 km	1:23:37
1995	World Championships	Gothenburg, Sweden	8th	20 km	1:22:30
1996	Olympic Games	Atlanta, United States	—	20 km	DSQ
1997	World Championships	Athens, Greece	13th	20 km	1:24:37
1998	European Championships	Budapest, Hungary	15th	20 km	1:26.43
1999	World Championships	Seville, Spain	6th	20 km	1:25:15
1999	World Championships	Seville, Spain	—	50 km	DSQ
2000	European Race Walking Cup	Eisenhüttenstadt, Germany	15th	20 km	1:22:25
2000	Olympic Games	Sydney, Australia	31st	20 km	1:26:31
