= Mikhail Orlov (race walker) =

Russian racewalker (born 1967)

Mikhail Orlov (born 25 June 1967) is a retired Russian race walker who won a bronze medal over 5000 metres walk at 1993 IAAF World Indoor Championships. He finished 6.57 seconds behind the silver medallist Robert Korzeniowski, while fellow Russian Mikhail Shchennikov won the race. The following year Orlov finished fifth at the European Championships.

Over 20 kilometres, Orlov recorded a time of 1:19:19 on February 11, 1995.
