= Jimmy McDonald (athlete) =

Irish racewalker

Personal information
- Full name: James McDonald
- Nationality: Irish
- Born: 11 April 1964 (age 61)

Sport
- Sport: Athletics
- Event: Racewalking

James McDonald (born 11 April 1964) is an Irish racewalker. He competed in the men's 20 kilometres walk at the 1988, 1992 and the 1996 Summer Olympics.
