= Dramatiska Institutet =

Former university college in Stockholm, Sweden

Coordinates: 59°20′21.98″N 18°6′4.68″E

Swedish Institute of Dramatic Art
- Dramatiska Institutet
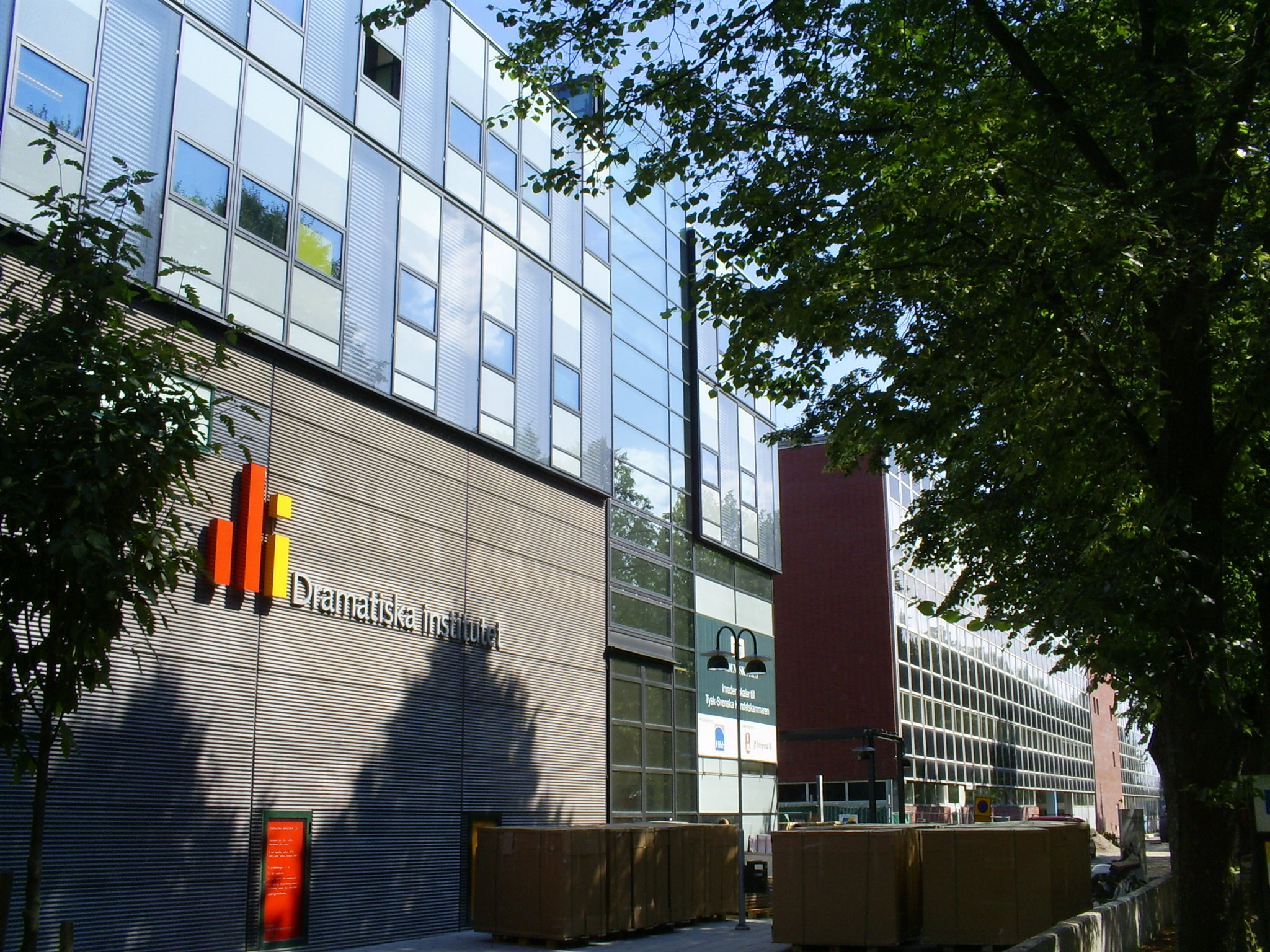
- The Dramatiska Institutet building in Östermalm
- Other names: University College of Film, Radio, Television and Theatre
- Established: 1970
- Students: 155 (FTE, 2009)
- Location: Stockholm, Sweden
- Website: https://www.uniarts.se/om-skh/stockholms-dramatiska-hogskola

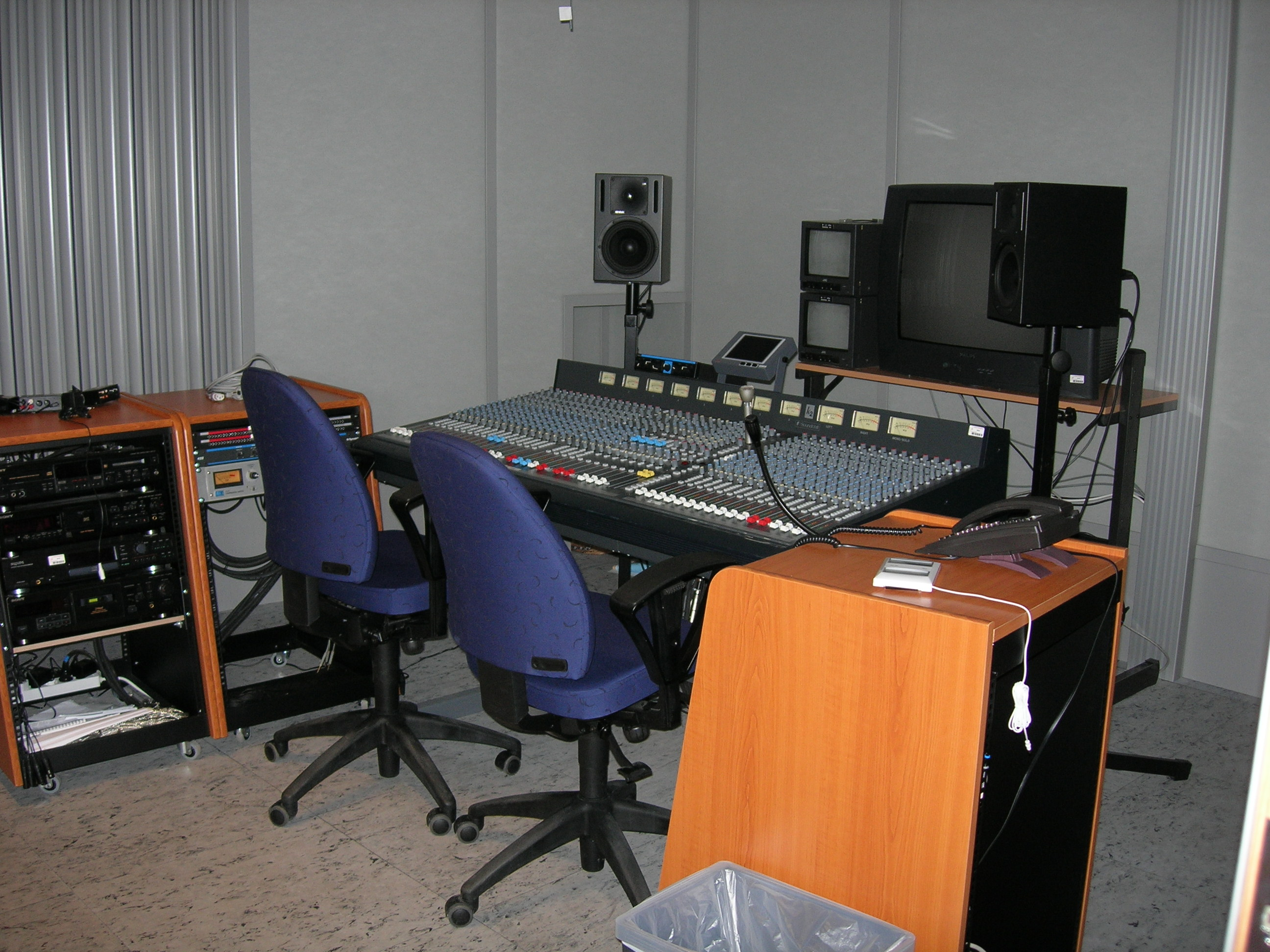
Equipment at Dramatiska Institutet

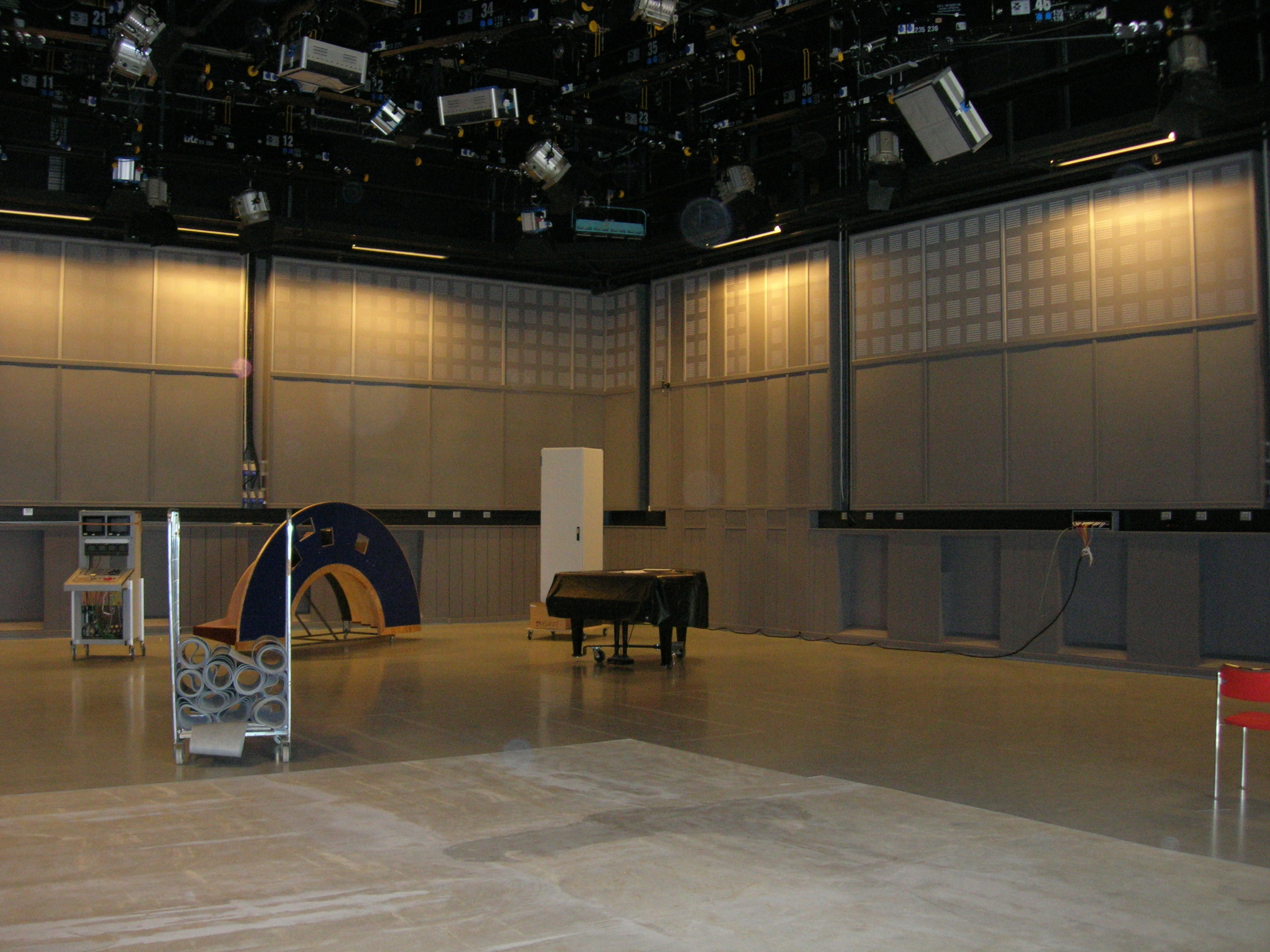
Studio at Dramatiska Institutet

Dramatiska institutet (DI; also known as the Swedish Institute of Dramatic Art or University College of Film, Radio, Television and Theatre) was a Swedish university college in Stockholm that provided education programs about activities surrounding film, radio, television, and theater. It was founded in 1970 by the Swedish government. Many famous media personalities and others in the film industry have studied at Dramatiska Institutet, including Anna Asp, Lene Berg, Josef Fares, Mark Levengood, Stina Lundberg Dabrowski, Anders Lundin, Lukas Moodysson, Kjell Sundvall, and Lisa Siwe.

On January 1, 2011 the school merged with the Swedish National Academy of Mime and Acting to become Stockholm Academy of Dramatic Arts, which later merged with the School of Dance and Circus and the University College of Opera to form the Stockholm University of the Arts.

== Merger ==
A merger proposal between Dramatiska Institutet and the Swedish National Academy of Mime and Acting was announced in April 2009. In January 2010, the Swedish government formed a committee to work on the merger. 15 million kronor were also divided between the two schools to use on the merger. Tobias Krantz, the Swedish Minister for Higher Education and Research, commented that the fact that "Dramatiska Institutet and the Swedish National Academy of Mime and Acting want to merge together is something I look positively on. If they think that through a merger they can [...] further increase the quality of their educations then that is of course something that the government supports." The new school opened on 1 January 2011.

== Controversy ==
In 2005, criticism was directed at Dramatiska Institutet after a student read an erotic story at the school for a group of six-year-olds as part of a project to see what effect sex has on children. The story involved two young girls having oral sex. This quickly gained attention in the Swedish media and it was labeled "the DI-scandal" in the press. Rector Per Lysander defended Dramatiska Institutet by stating that the story-reading had not been approved by them beforehand. The reading was part of a larger project that involved several professors and students from four schools in Stockholm and that was going to lead to a theater play about children's sexuality.

Soon after the incident gained attention, more controversial experiments that had been made for the project were revealed. As a result, Lysander announced that an investigation had been launched by DI. Bengt Westerberg, an investigator hired by the school, found that the students involved in the project had not discussed ethical questions beforehand and had been given bad guidance from the professors. Lysander announced that the result of this investigation "will lay the foundation for change" at the school.
