= Jan Staaf =

Swedish racewalker

- Born: Jan Egon Staaf; 11 January 1962 (age 64); Västerås, Sweden

Jan Egon Staaf (born 11 January 1962 in Västerås) is a Swedish police commissioner and former track and field athlete who competed in walking. He twice competed for his country at the Summer Olympics: in 1988 and 1996. Staaf set his personal best (1:22.37) in the men's 20 km walk event in 1997.

Jan Staaf joined the police force in 1998 after his retirement from the sport. He was serving as head of investigation in serious crimes when got involved in the murders of Mohammed Ammouri and Anna-Lena Svensson in Linköping in 2004. He led the investigation which was solved with the help of DNA genealogy. The investigation lasted 16 years and became Sweden's second largest criminal investigation after the investigation into the assassination of Olof Palme. In June 2021, Staaf was awarded for his service and promoted to the rank of Norrköping police commissioner.

When the case and investigation were depicted in the Netflix series Genombrottet (AKA The Breakthrough (2025), the character John Sundin, who is based on Staaf, was played by Peter Eggers.

== Achievements ==
Year	Competition	Venue	Position	Notes
Representing Sweden
1982	European Championships	Athens, Greece	16th	20 km
1983	World Championships	Helsinki, Finland	DNF	20 km
1986	European Championships	Stuttgart, West Germany	9th	20 km
1987	World Championships	Rome, Italy	17th	20 km
1988	Olympic Games	Seoul, South Korea	30th	20 km
1988	Olympic Games	Seoul, South Korea	DNF	50 km
1993	World Championships	Stuttgart, Germany	28th	20 km
1996	Olympic Games	Atlanta, Georgia	30th	20 km
1998	European Championships	Budapest, Hungary	DNF	50 km
