= 2012 IAAF World Race Walking Cup =

- Organisers: IAAF
- Edition: 25th
- Date: 12–13 May
- Host city: Saransk, Mordovia, Russia
- Events: 5
- Participation: 449 athletes from 61 nations

The 2012 IAAF World Race Walking Cup was held in Saransk, Russia, on 12–13 May 2012. The track of the Cup runs in the central streets of the city. Detailed reports on the event and an appraisal of the results was given for the IAAF.

Complete results were published.

== Medallists ==
Event	Gold		Silver		Bronze	
Men
Men's 20 km walk	Zhen Wang (CHN)	1:19:13	Andrey Krivov (RUS)	1:19:27	Ruslan Dmytrenko (UKR)	1:20:17 PB
Men's 50 km walk	Jared Tallent (AUS)	3:40:32 SB	Si Tianfeng (CHN)	3:43:05	Christopher Linke (GER)	3:47:33
Men's 10 km walk (junior event)	Éider Arévalo (COL)	41:17 SB	Alexander Ivanov (RUS)	41:42	Jesús Tadeo Vega (MEX)	41:56
Women
Women's 20 km walk	Elena Lashmanova (RUS)	1:27:38	María José Poves (ESP)	1:29:10	Lu Xiuzhi (CHN)	1:29:55
Women's 10 km walk (junior event)	Sandra Arenas (COL)	45:57	Alejandra Ortega (MEX)	46:00 AJ	Nadezhda Leontyeva (RUS)	46:02
Team (Men)
Team Men's 20 km walk	China (CHN)	16	Ukraine (UKR)	18	Australia (AUS)	62
Team Men's 50 km walk	China (CHN)	28	Ukraine (UKR)	31	Mexico (MEX)	43
Team Men's 10 km walk (junior event)	Russia (RUS)	6	Colombia (COL)	10	China (CHN)	14
Team (Women)
Team Women's 20 km walk	Spain (ESP)	16	Russia (RUS)	27	China (CHN)	32
Team Women's 10 km walk (junior event)	Russia (RUS)	7	China (CHN)	15	Ukraine (UKR)	15

== Results ==
=== Men's 20 km ===
Place	Athlete	Nation	Time	Notes
1st place, gold medalist(s)	Zhen Wang	China (CHN)	1:19:13	
2nd place, silver medalist(s)	Andrey Krivov	Russia (RUS)	1:19:27	
3rd place, bronze medalist(s)	Ruslan Dmytrenko	Ukraine (UKR)	1:20:17	PB
4	Andrey Ruzavin	Russia (RUS)	1:20:37	
5	Nazar Kovalenko	Ukraine (UKR)	1:20:38	
6	Eder Sánchez	Mexico (MEX)	1:20:58	
7	Chen Ding	China (CHN)	1:21:05	
8	Zhao Qi	China (CHN)	1:21:46	
9	Robert Heffernan	Ireland (IRL)	1:21:51	
10	Ivan Losev	Ukraine (UKR)	1:21:57	
11	Inaki Gomez	Canada (CAN)	1:21:58	
12	Rafal Fedaczynski	Poland (POL)	1:22:05	
13	Isamu Fujisawa	Japan (JPN)	1:22:05	
14	Ivan Trotski	Belarus (BLR)	1:22:05	SB
15	Caio Bonfim	Brazil (BRA)	1:22:05	SB
16	Irfan Kolothum Thodi	India (IND)	1:22:09	PB
17	João Vieira	Portugal (POR)	1:22:11	SB
18	Chris Erickson	Australia (AUS)	1:22:20	PB
19	Giorgio Rubino	Italy (ITA)	1:22:42	
20	Adam Rutter	Australia (AUS)	1:22:54	
21	Babubhai Kesharabhai Panucha	India (IND)	1:22:56	PB
22	Bertrand Moulinet	France (FRA)	1:22:59	
23	Yuki Yamazaki	Japan (JPN)	1:23:19	SB
24	Luke Adams	Australia (AUS)	1:23:28	
25	Gustavo Restrepo	Colombia (COL)	1:23:34	SB
26	Pedro Daniel Gómez	Mexico (MEX)	1:23:40	SB
27	Wang Hao	China (CHN)	1:23:40	SB
28	James Rendón	Colombia (COL)	1:23:43	SB
29	Jarkko Kinnunen	Finland (FIN)	1:23:43	
30	José Leonardo Montaña	Colombia (COL)	1:23:45	PB
31	Surinder Singh	India (IND)	1:24:05	
32	Cai Zelin	China (CHN)	1:24:09	
33	Benjamín Sánchez	Spain (ESP)	1:24:10	SB
34	Jakub Jelonek	Poland (POL)	1:24:18	
35	Matteo Giupponi	Italy (ITA)	1:24:23	
36	Koichiro Morioka	Japan (JPN)	1:24:44	
37	Trevor Barron	United States (USA)	1:24:54	
38	Francisco Arcilla	Spain (ESP)	1:25:05	
39	Antonin Boyez	France (FRA)	1:25:20	SB
40	Miguel Ángel López	Spain (ESP)	1:25:31	
41	Dane Bird-Smith	Australia (AUS)	1:25:41	
42	Dzianis Simanovich	Belarus (BLR)	1:25:41	
43	Andrei Talashka	Belarus (BLR)	1:25:51	SB
44	Jonathan Rieckmann	Brazil (BRA)	1:25:52	
45	Riccardo Macchia	Italy (ITA)	1:26:10	PB
46	David Mejia	Mexico (MEX)	1:26:11	SB
47	Luis Fernando López	Colombia (COL)	1:26:14	SB
48	Edward Araya	Chile (CHI)	1:26:14	PB
49	Isaac Palma	Mexico (MEX)	1:26:25	
50	Rolando Saquipay	Ecuador (ECU)	1:26:37	
51	Alex Wright	Great Britain (GBR)	1:26:38	SB
52	Vitali Talankou	Belarus (BLR)	1:26:43	
53	Ihor Lyashchenko	Ukraine (UKR)	1:26:49	
54	Ever Palma	Mexico (MEX)	1:26:56	
55	Marcel Lehmberg	Germany (GER)	1:27:06	PB
56	Perseus Karlström	Sweden (SWE)	1:27:14	SB
57	Hirooki Arai	Japan (JPN)	1:27:17	
58	Mauricio Arteaga	Ecuador (ECU)	1:27:19	
59	Vito Di Bari	Italy (ITA)	1:27:26	
60	Máté Helebrandt	Hungary (HUN)	1:27:39	
61	Brendan Boyce	Ireland (IRL)	1:27:46	SB
62	Aliaksandr Liakhovich	Belarus (BLR)	1:27:51	SB
63	Predrag Filipović	Serbia (SRB)	1:27:56	
64	Andriy Kovenko	Ukraine (UKR)	1:28:04	
65	Juan Manuel Cano	Argentina (ARG)	1:28:12	
66	Antti Kempas	Finland (FIN)	1:28:20	SB
67	Kevin Campion	France (FRA)	1:28:29	
68	Cédric Houssaye	France (FRA)	1:28:33	
69	Tom Bosworth	Great Britain (GBR)	1:28:45	
70	Hagen Pohle	Germany (GER)	1:28:58	
71	Hédi Teraoui	Tunisia (TUN)	1:29:05	SB
72	José Rubio	Ecuador (ECU)	1:29:31	PB
73	Karel Ketner	Czech Republic (CZE)	1:29:44	
74	Lebogang Shange	South Africa (RSA)	1:30:05	
75	Ronal Quispe	Bolivia (BOL)	1:30:06	SB
76	Sándor Rácz	Hungary (HUN)	1:30:09	
77	Yerko Araya	Chile (CHI)	1:30:24	SB
78	Creighton Connolly	Canada (CAN)	1:30:49	PB
79	Thami Hlatshwayo	South Africa (RSA)	1:30:58	
80	Dawid Wolski	Poland (POL)	1:31:17	
81	Allan Segura	Costa Rica (CRC)	1:31:21	SB
82	Benjamin Thorne	Canada (CAN)	1:31:26	SB
83	Vahid Sepahi Badjani	Iran (IRI)	1:31:31	
84	Daniel Voigt	Brazil (BRA)	1:31:47	PB
85	Moustafa Ghodaia	Egypt (EGY)	1:32:01	PB
86	Wayne Snyman	South Africa (RSA)	1:32:16	
87	Rhydian Cowley	Australia (AUS)	1:32:28	
88	Aleksi Ojala	Finland (FIN)	1:33:32	
89	Ebrahim Rahimian	Iran (IRI)	1:33:47	
90	Pierre De Villiers	South Africa (RSA)	1:34:03	
91	Ben Wears	Great Britain (GBR)	1:34:18	PB
92	Choon Sieng Lo	Malaysia (MAS)	1:34:26	
93	Armond Nel	South Africa (RSA)	1:35:15	
94	Kemal Gelecek	Turkey (TUR)	1:37:17	PB
95	Patrick Stroupe	United States (USA)	1:37:59	
96	Lauri Lelumees	Estonia (EST)	1:39:17	SB
97	Serkan Dogan	Turkey (TUR)	1:41:16	
98	Nicholas Christie	United States (USA)	1:41:48	
99	Bruno Carrière	Canada (CAN)	1:43:28	PB
100	Dan Serianni	United States (USA)	1:45:02	SB
101	Ali Ismail	Lebanon (LIB)	1:45:18	PB
102	Bozhidar Vasilev	Bulgaria (BUL)	1:46:01	
103	Edmund Sim	Singapore (SIN)	DNF	^{*}
104	Shukhrat Irmatov	Tajikistan (TJK)	DNF	^{*}
105	Husam Abunusair	Palestine (PLE)	DNF	^{*}
—	Vladimir Kanaykin	Russia (RUS)	1:19:43	DSQ
—	Valeriy Borchin	Russia (RUS)	1:21:29	DSQ
—	Moacir Zimmermann	Brazil (BRA)	DQ	230.6(a)
—	Erick Barrondo	Guatemala (GUA)	DQ	230.6(a)
—	Maniram Patel	India (IND)	DQ	230.6(a)
—	Edwin Ochoa	Ecuador (ECU)	DQ	230.6(a)
—	Harold van Beek	Netherlands (NED)	DQ	230.6(a)
—	Timothy Seaman	United States (USA)	DQ	230.6(a)
—	Sergey Morozov	Russia (RUS)	DQ	32.2(a)
—	Recep Çelik	Turkey (TUR)	DQ	32.2(a)
—	Patryk Rogowski	Poland (POL)	DNF	
—	Sérgio Vieira	Portugal (POR)	DNF	
—	Dawid Tomala	Poland (POL)	DNF	
—	Hassanine Sebei	Tunisia (TUN)	DNF	
—	Evan Dunfee	Canada (CAN)	DNF	
—	Iuri Tatarciuc	Moldova (MDA)	DNF	
—	Veli-Matti Partanen	Finland (FIN)	DNF	
—	Alberto Amezcua	Spain (ESP)	DNF	

^{*}: beyond Time Limit
IAAF Rule 230.6(a): repeated failure to comply with the definition of race walking
IAAF Rule 32.2(a): presence of a Prohibited Substance or its Metabolites or Markers in the Athlete's Sample

- The original bronze medallist Vladimir Kanaykin and ninth-placer Valeriy Borchin were both disqualified for doping

=== Team (Men 20 km) ===
Place	Country	Points
1	China	16 pts
2	Ukraine	18 pts
3	Australia	62 pts
4	India	68 pts
5	Japan	72 pts
6	Mexico	78 pts
7	Colombia	83 pts
8	Belarus	99 pts
9	Italy	99 pts
10	Spain	111 pts
11	Poland	126 pts
12	France	128 pts
13	Brazil	143 pts
14	Canada	171 pts
15	Ecuador	180 pts
16	Finland	183 pts
17	United Kingdom	211 pts
18	United States	230 pts
19	South Africa	239 pts

=== Men's 50 km ===
Place	Athlete	Nation	Time	Notes
1st place, gold medalist(s)	Jared Tallent	Australia (AUS)	3:40:32	SB
2nd place, silver medalist(s)	Si Tianfeng	China (CHN)	3:43:05	SB
3rd place, bronze medalist(s)	Christopher Linke	Germany (GER)	3:47:33	PB
4	Jesús Ángel García	Spain (ESP)	3:48:15	SB
5	Xu Faguang	China (CHN)	3:48:47	SB
6	Marco De Luca	Italy (ITA)	3:49:50	SB
7	Rafał Augustyn	Poland (POL)	3:49:53	SB
8	Oleksiy Kazanin	Ukraine (UKR)	3:50:17	PB
9	Horacio Nava	Mexico (MEX)	3:51:23	SB
10	Ihor Hlavan	Ukraine (UKR)	3:51:24	PB
11	Rafal Sikora	Poland (POL)	3:51:43	
12	Colin Griffin	Ireland (IRL)	3:52:55	SB
13	Serhiy Budza	Ukraine (UKR)	3:53:02	PB
14	José Leyver	Mexico (MEX)	3:53:38	
15	Mikhail Ryzhov	Russia (RUS)	3:53:49	PB
16	Oleksiy Shelest	Ukraine (UKR)	3:54:52	SB
17	Ivan Noskov	Russia (RUS)	3:55:16	PB
18	Park Chil-Sung	South Korea (KOR)	3:55:24	SB
19	Kim Dong-Young	South Korea (KOR)	3:56:12	SB
20	Clemente García	Mexico (MEX)	3:57:18	
21	Cui Zhide	China (CHN)	3:57:23	
22	Marius Cocioran	Romania (ROU)	3:57:55	PB
23	Marc Mundell	South Africa (RSA)	3:57:57	AR
24	Pedro Isidro	Portugal (POR)	3:58:00	PB
25	Teodorico Caporaso	Italy (ITA)	3:59:19	PB
26	Fredy Hernández	Colombia (COL)	4:00:22	SB
27	Oleksandr Venhlovskyy	Ukraine (UKR)	4:00:55	PB
28	Mario José dos Santos Jr	Brazil (BRA)	4:02:09	SB
29	Basanta Bahadur Rana	India (IND)	4:02:13	PB
30	Mikel Odriozola	Spain (ESP)	4:03:19	SB
31	Omar Zepeda	Mexico (MEX)	4:03:35	
32	Rodrigo Moreno	Colombia (COL)	4:03:38	SB
33	Kumar Sandeep	India (IND)	4:03:45	PB
34	Dzmitry Dziubin	Belarus (BLR)	4:03:53	PB
35	Andrei Stsepanchuk	Belarus (BLR)	4:04:02	SB
36	Xavier Le Coz	France (FRA)	4:05:06	PB
37	Luis Manuel Corchete	Spain (ESP)	4:06:07	
38	Anatole Ibáñez	Sweden (SWE)	4:06:12	PB
39	Oh Se-Han	South Korea (KOR)	4:06:27	SB
40	Tadas Šuškevicius	Lithuania (LTU)	4:06:29	SB
41	David Cristian Berdeja	Mexico (MEX)	4:06:55	
42	Alejandro Francisco Florez	Switzerland (SUI)	4:07:36	PB
43	Dionísio Ventura	Portugal (POR)	4:10:27	SB
44	Vitaliy Anichkin	Kazakhstan (KAZ)	4:10:30	PB
45	Luís Gil	Portugal (POR)	4:11:47	
46	Hervé Davaux	France (FRA)	4:12:39	SB
47	Pavel Yarokhau	Belarus (BLR)	4:12:40	
48	Dominic King	Great Britain (GBR)	4:13:25	
49	Georgiy Sheiko	Kazakhstan (KAZ)	4:13:58	PB
50	Dušan Majdan	Slovakia (SVK)	4:14:15	
51	Lorenzo Dessi	Italy (ITA)	4:14:56	SB
52	Abdinur Alibek	Kazakhstan (KAZ)	4:14:57	PB
53	Dzmitry Hamzunou	Belarus (BLR)	4:15:51	SB
54	Chandan Singh	India (IND)	4:16:23	PB
55	Lukás Gdula	Czech Republic (CZE)	4:17:05	
56	Miguel Angel Prieto	Spain (ESP)	4:19:52	
57	Maik Berger	Germany (GER)	4:20:38	
58	Daniel King	Great Britain (GBR)	4:20:49	SB
59	Gurpreet Singh	India (IND)	4:21:19	PB
60	Jean-Jacques Nkouloukidi	Italy (ITA)	4:21:46	SB
61	Federico Tontodonati	Italy (ITA)	4:22:26	SB
62	Jérome Caprice	Mauritius (MRI)	4:22:49	PB
63	Dzianis Krauchuk	Belarus (BLR)	4:23:08	SB
64	Mario Alfonso Bran	Guatemala (GUA)	4:23:42	PB
65	Yim Junghyun	South Korea (KOR)	4:24:35	SB
66	Zoltán Czukor	Hungary (HUN)	4:26:17	SB
67	Edgar Cudco	Ecuador (ECU)	4:32:20	PB
68	Margus Luik	Estonia (EST)	4:38:37	SB
69	Fabio González	Argentina (ARG)	4:42:40	
70	Fabio Ruzzier	Slovenia (SLO)	DNF	^{*}
71	Albert Mukwa Ngambene	DR Congo (COD)	DNF	^{*}
—	Sergey Kirdyapkin	Russia (RUS)	3:38:08	DSQ
—	Sergey Bakulin	Russia (RUS)	3:46:14	DSQ
—	Andreas Gustafsson	Sweden (SWE)	DQ	230.6(a)
—	Andrés Chocho	Ecuador (ECU)	DQ	230.6(a)
—	Håvard Haukenes	Norway (NOR)	DQ	230.6(a)
—	Igor Erokhin	Russia (RUS)	DQ	32.2(a)
—	Artur Brzozowski	Poland (POL)	DNF	
—	Arnis Rumbenieks	Latvia (LAT)	DNF	
—	Vladimir Savanović	Serbia (SRB)	DNF	
—	Vjačeslavs Grigorjevs	Latvia (LAT)	DNF	
—	Bernardo Calvo	Costa Rica (CRC)	DNF	
—	Ian Rayson	Australia (AUS)	DNF	
—	Ricard Rekst	Lithuania (LTU)	DNF	
—	Lukasz Nowak	Poland (POL)	DNF	
—	Aníbal Paau	Guatemala (GUA)	DNF	
—	Michael Doyle	Ireland (IRL)	DNF	
—	Li Jianbo	China (CHN)	DNF	
—	Zhao Jianguo	China (CHN)	DNF	
—	Anatoliy Krakhmalev	Kazakhstan (KAZ)	DNF	
—	Chokirjon Irmatov	Tajikistan (TJK)	DNF	
—	Pedro Martins	Portugal (POR)	DNF	
—	Augusto Cardoso	Portugal (POR)	DNF	
—	Grzegorz Sudol	Poland (POL)	DNF	
—	Nenad Filipović	Serbia (SRB)	DNF	
—	Juan Manuel Molina	Spain (ESP)	DNF	
—	André Höhne	Germany (GER)	DNF	
—	Jamie Costin	Ireland (IRL)	DNF	
—	Róbert Tubak	Hungary (HUN)	DNF	
—	Magno Mesías Zapata	Ecuador (ECU)	DNF	
—	Kim Hyunsub	South Korea (KOR)	DNF	
—	Jaime Quiyuch	Guatemala (GUA)	DNF	
—	Jānis Strautiņš	Latvia (LAT)	DNF	
—	Vilius Mikelionis	Lithuania (LTU)	DNF	
—	Jonnathan Caceres	Ecuador (ECU)	DNF	
—	Fedosei Ciumacenco	Moldova (MDA)	DNF	
—	Benjamin Shorey	United States (USA)	DNF	
—	Xavier Moreno	Ecuador (ECU)	DNF	
—	Carsten Schmidt	Germany (GER)	DNF	
—	Erich Cordero	United States (USA)	DNF	

^{*}: beyond Time Limit
IAAF Rule 230.6(a): repeated failure to comply with the definition of race walking IAAF Rule 32.2(a): presence of a Prohibited Substance or its Metabolites or Markers in the Athlete's Sample

- Original Gold Medallist Sergey Kirdyapkin and fourth-placer Sergey Bakulin had their times and placings annulled due to doping violations.

=== Team (Men 50 km) ===
Place	Country	Points
1	China	28 pts
2	Ukraine	31 pts
3	Mexico	43 pts
4	Spain	71 pts
5	South Korea	76 pts
6	Italy	82 pts
7	Portugal	112 pts
8	Belarus	116 pts
9	India	116 pts
10	Kazakhstan	145 pts

== Men's 10 km (Junior) ==
Place	Athlete	Nation	Time	Notes
1st place, gold medalist(s)	Éider Arévalo	Colombia (COL)	41:17	SB
2nd place, silver medalist(s)	Alexander Ivanov	Russia (RUS)	41:42	
3rd place, bronze medalist(s)	Jesús Tadeo Vega	Mexico (MEX)	41:56	
4	Damir Baybikov	Russia (RUS)	42:11	
5	Francesco Fortunato	Italy (ITA)	42:13	PB
6	Yin Jiaxing	China (CHN)	42:18	SB
7	Nils Brembach	Germany (GER)	42:35	
8	Gao Wenkui	China (CHN)	42:47	
9	Kenny Martín Pérez	Colombia (COL)	42:51	SB
10	Yauheni Zalesski	Belarus (BLR)	42:55	
11	Mario Sánchez	Mexico (MEX)	43:02	
12	Paolo Yurivilca	Peru (PER)	43:02	PB
13	Brian Pintado	Ecuador (ECU)	43:09	SB
14	Iván Pajuelo	Spain (ESP)	43:10	PB
15	Jiang Shan	China (CHN)	43:12	
16	Luis Angel Sanchez	Guatemala (GUA)	43:13	PB
17	Blake Steele	Australia (AUS)	43:15	PB
18	Vito Minei	Italy (ITA)	43:27	
19	Andriy Hrechkovskyy	Ukraine (UKR)	43:36	PB
20	Adrian-Ionut Dragomir	Romania (ROU)	43:42	PB
21	Barys Sharhar	Belarus (BLR)	43:49	
22	Edgars Gjačs	Latvia (LAT)	43:53	PB
23	Vladyslav Lobchenko	Ukraine (UKR)	44:10	
24	Jesse Osborne	Australia (AUS)	44:15	PB
26	Toufik Yesref	Algeria (ALG)	44:23	
27	Kirill Frolov	Russia (RUS)	44:27	
28	Bruno Fidelis	Brazil (BRA)	44:27	PB
29	Miklós Srp	Hungary (HUN)	44:29	SB
30	Sahin Senoduncu	Turkey (TUR)	44:35	PB
31	Mert Atli	Turkey (TUR)	44:35	PB
32	Nathan Brill	Australia (AUS)	44:52	PB
33	Artsiom Turkou	Belarus (BLR)	44:56	
34	Álvaro Martín	Spain (ESP)	45:01	
35	Marc Tur	Spain (ESP)	45:07	
36	Adrien Cassagnes	France (FRA)	45:12	PB
37	Miguel Carvalho	Portugal (POR)	45:16	
38	Mohamed Mohamed Saleh	Egypt (EGY)	45:19	PB
39	Manuel Esteban Soto	Colombia (COL)	45:24	
40	Keny Guinaudeau	France (FRA)	45:37	PB
41	Samuel Pereira	Portugal (POR)	45:49	
42	Lukasz Kostka	Poland (POL)	46:00	
43	Bence Venyercsán	Hungary (HUN)	46:04	
44	Cristian Andrade	Ecuador (ECU)	46:05	PB
45	Tomasz Dmowski	Poland (POL)	46:07	
46	Alejandro Chavez	United States (USA)	46:28	PB
47	Yuriy Shvaryk	Ukraine (UKR)	46:43	
48	Bruno Pedro	Portugal (POR)	46:47	PB
49	Michael Nemeth	United States (USA)	46:48	
50	Joachim Saelen	Norway (NOR)	47:07	PB
51	Aymene Sabri	Algeria (ALG)	47:32	
52	Aurelien Quinion	France (FRA)	47:39	
53	Mohamed Ramoul	Algeria (ALG)	47:55	
54	Luke Hickey	Ireland (IRL)	48:05	
55	Ivan Salyakhov	Kazakhstan (KAZ)	48:05	PB
56	Szymon Zieliński	Poland (POL)	48:14	
57	Robert Friederich Latcu	Romania (ROU)	48:34	
58	Jonathan Hallman	United States (USA)	48:51	
59	James Treanor	Ireland (IRL)	48:55	
61	Ondrej Motl	Czech Republic (CZE)	50:03	
62	Islam Rizk Belal	Egypt (EGY)	50:15	PB
63	Raivo Saulgriezis	Latvia (LAT)	53:23	SB
—	Óscar Villavicencio	Ecuador (ECU)	DQ	230.6(a)
—	Jamie Higgins	Great Britain (GBR)	DNF	
—	Ozan Pamuk	Turkey (TUR)	DNF	
—	Erwin González	Mexico (MEX)	DNF	

IAAF Rule 230.6(a): repeated failure to comply with the definition of race walking

=== Team (Men 10 km Junior) ===
Place	Country	Points
1	Russia	6 pts
2	Colombia	10 pts
3	China	14 pts
4	Mexico	14 pts
5	Italy	23 pts
6	Belarus	31 pts
7	Australia	41 pts
8	Ukraine	42 pts
9	Spain	48 pts
10	Ecuador	57 pts
11	Turkey	61 pts
12	Hungary	72 pts
13	France	76 pts
14	Algeria	77 pts
15	Romania	77 pts
16	Portugal	78 pts
17	Latvia	85 pts
18	Poland	87 pts
19	United States	95 pts
20	Egypt	100 pts
21	Ireland	113 pts
22	Czech Republic	121 pts

=== Women's 20 km ===
Place	Athlete	Nation	Time	Notes
1st place, gold medalist(s)	Elena Lashmanova	Russia (RUS)	1:27:38	
2nd place, silver medalist(s)	María José Poves	Spain (ESP)	1:29:10	
3rd place, bronze medalist(s)	Xiuzhi Lu	China (CHN)	1:29:55	
4	Beatriz Pascual	Spain (ESP)	1:30:46	
5	Anisya Kirdyapkina	Russia (RUS)	1:31:00	SB
6	Elisa Rigaudo	Italy (ITA)	1:31:25	
7	Olive Loughnane	Ireland (IRL)	1:31:32	SB
8	Ana Cabecinha	Portugal (POR)	1:31:42	
9	Inês Henriques	Portugal (POR)	1:31:43	
10	Júlia Takács	Spain (ESP)	1:32:05	SB
11	Claudia Stef	Romania (ROU)	1:32:15	
12	Olena Shumkina	Ukraine (UKR)	1:32:19	
13	Eleonora Giorgi	Italy (ITA)	1:32:57	PB
14	Shenjie Qieyang	China (CHN)	1:33:00	
15	Gao Ni	China (CHN)	1:33:04	
16	Vera Santos	Portugal (POR)	1:33:08	
17	Kumi Otoshi	Japan (JPN)	1:33:09	
18	Melanie Seeger	Germany (GER)	1:33:24	SB
19	Olha Iakovenko	Ukraine (UKR)	1:33:29	SB
20	Federica Ferraro	Italy (ITA)	1:33:41	SB
21	Irina Yumanova	Russia (RUS)	1:34:17	
22	Nie Jingjing	China (CHN)	1:34:30	
23	Regan Lamble	Australia (AUS)	1:34:34	SB
24	Mayra Herrera	Guatemala (GUA)	1:34:46	
25	Lucie Pelantová	Czech Republic (CZE)	1:34:48	
26	Kristina Saltanovic	Lithuania (LTU)	1:35:32	SB
27	Ingrid Hernández	Colombia (COL)	1:35:43	
28	Claudia Balderrama	Bolivia (BOL)	1:35:54	PB
29	Arabelly Orjuela	Colombia (COL)	1:36:14	
30	Paulina Buziak	Poland (POL)	1:36:17	
31	Nadiya Borovska	Ukraine (UKR)	1:36:27	
32	Hanna Drabenia	Belarus (BLR)	1:36:43	
33	Sylwia Korzeniowska	France (FRA)	1:36:53	
34	Laura Reynolds	Ireland (IRL)	1:37:06	
35	Agnieszka Szwarnóg	Poland (POL)	1:37:14	
36	Ana Rodean	Romania (ROU)	1:37:23	
37	Erica de Sena	Brazil (BRA)	1:37:44	
38	Laura Polli	Switzerland (SUI)	1:38:01	
39	Anita Kažemāka	Latvia (LAT)	1:38:04	
40	Brigita Virbalytė	Lithuania (LTU)	1:38:25	
41	Johanna Jackson	Great Britain (GBR)	1:38:29	SB
42	Sandra Galvis	Colombia (COL)	1:38:34	
43	Sniazhana Yurchanka	Belarus (BLR)	1:38:37	
44	Milángela Rosales	Venezuela (VEN)	1:38:43	
45	Rachel Seaman	Canada (CAN)	1:38:44	
46	Anne Halkivaha	Finland (FIN)	1:39:08	
47	Paola Pérez	Ecuador (ECU)	1:39:11	
48	Miranda Melville	United States (USA)	1:39:14	SB
49	Ana Maria Groza	Romania (ROU)	1:39:16	SB
50	Edina Füsti	Hungary (HUN)	1:39:22	
51	Maritza Guamán	Ecuador (ECU)	1:39:31	PB
52	Neringa Aidietytė	Lithuania (LTU)	1:39:34	
53	Nastassia Yatsevich	Belarus (BLR)	1:39:56	
54	Antonella Palmisano	Italy (ITA)	1:40:17	
55	Katarzyna Kwoka	Poland (POL)	1:40:35	
56	Lorena Luaces	Spain (ESP)	1:40:47	
57	Yadira Guamán	Ecuador (ECU)	1:41:31	
58	Mónica Equihua	Mexico (MEX)	1:41:34	
59	Marie Polli	Switzerland (SUI)	1:42:03	
60	Erin Gray	United States (USA)	1:42:16	
61	Karoliina Kaasalainen	Finland (FIN)	1:42:27	SB
62	Nicola Evangelista	Canada (CAN)	1:42:37	PB
63	Inès Pastorino	France (FRA)	1:42:40	
64	Susana Feitor	Portugal (POR)	1:42:48	
65	Monika Kapera	Poland (POL)	1:43:22	
66	Maria Czaková	Slovakia (SVK)	1:43:30	
67	Anne-Gaëlle Retout	France (FRA)	1:43:59	
68	Khushbir Kaur	India (IND)	1:44:07	
69	Georgiana Enache	Romania (ROU)	1:44:16	
70	Lauren Forgues	United States (USA)	1:44:31	
71	Rei Inoue	Japan (JPN)	1:45:04	
72	Kristine Platace	Latvia (LAT)	1:45:29	
73	Magaly Bonilla	Ecuador (ECU)	1:46:03	PB
74	Kathleen Burnett	United States (USA)	1:46:11	
75	Violaine Averous	France (FRA)	1:46:45	
76	Chaima Trabelsi	Tunisia (TUN)	1:47:40	SB
77	Alina Matveyuk	Belarus (BLR)	1:48:21	
78	Florida Miniyanova	Kazakhstan (KAZ)	1:48:49	PB
79	Viktória Madarász	Hungary (HUN)	1:49:05	
80	Ching Siu Nga	Hong Kong (HKG)	1:49:30	
81	Anett Torma	Hungary (HUN)	1:50:04	SB
82	Amandine Marcou	France (FRA)	1:50:40	PB
83	Polina Repina	Kazakhstan (KAZ)	1:51:56	PB
84	Gehad Meshref	Egypt (EGY)	DNF	^{*}
85	Maarika Taukul	Estonia (EST)	DNF	^{*}
86	Linda Vítová	Czech Republic (CZE)	DNF	^{*}
—	Olga Kaniskina	Russia (RUS)	1:28:33	DSQ
—	Sibilla Di Vincenzo	Italy (ITA)	DQ	230.6(a)
—	Claire Tallent	Australia (AUS)	DQ	230.6(a)
—	Beki Lee	Australia (AUS)	DQ	230.6(a)
—	Mirna Ortíz	Guatemala (GUA)	DQ	230.6(a)
—	Olfa Lafi	Tunisia (TUN)	DQ	230.6(a)
—	Handan Kocyigit	Turkey (TUR)	DQ	32.2(a)
—	Olena Shevchuk	Ukraine (UKR)	DNF	
—	Nicole Fagan	Australia (AUS)	DNF	
—	Sabine Krantz	Germany (GER)	DNF	
—	Galina Kichigina	Kazakhstan (KAZ)	DNF	
—	Zuzana Schindlerová	Czech Republic (CZE)	DNF	
—	María Vasco	Spain (ESP)	DNF	
—	Agnieszka Dygacz	Poland (POL)	DNF	
—	Semiha Mutlu	Turkey (TUR)	DNF	
—	Nataliya Zhornyak	Ukraine (UKR)	DNF	
—	Elmira Alembekova	Russia (RUS)	DNF	
—	Solomiya Login	United States (USA)	DNF	
—	Deepmala Devi	India (IND)	DNS	

^{*}: beyond Time Limit
IAAF Rule 230.6(a): repeated failure to comply with the definition of race walking
IAAF Rule 32.2(a): presence of a Prohibited Substance or its Metabolites or Markers in the Athlete's Sample

- The original silver medallist Olga Kaniskina had her performance annulled due to doping.

=== Team (Women 20 km) ===
Place	Country	Points
1	Spain	16 pts
2	Russia	27 pts
3	China	32 pts
4	Portugal	33 pts
5	Italy	39 pts
6	Ukraine	62 pts
7	Romania	96 pts
8	Colombia	98 pts
9	Lithuania	118 pts
10	Poland	120 pts
11	Belarus	128 pts
12	Ecuador	155 pts
13	France	164 pts
14	United States	179 pts
15	Hungary	212 pts

== Women's 10 km (Junior) ==
Place	Athlete	Nation	Time	Notes
1st place, gold medalist(s)	Sandra Arenas	Colombia (COL)	45:57	
2nd place, silver medalist(s)	Alejandra Ortega	Mexico (MEX)	46:00	AJ
3rd place, bronze medalist(s)	Nadezhda Leontyeva	Russia (RUS)	46:02	
4	Ekaterina Medvedeva	Russia (RUS)	46:18	
5	Lyudmyla Olyanovska	Ukraine (UKR)	46:35	PB
6	Kate Veale	Ireland (IRL)	46:53	SB
7	Mao Yanxue	China (CHN)	47:05	SB
8	Duan Dandan	China (CHN)	47:12	SB
9	Ni Yuanyuan	China (CHN)	47:49	
10	Alina Halchenko	Ukraine (UKR)	47:52	
11	Kimberly García	Peru (PER)	47:56	SB
12	Katarina Strmenová	Slovakia (SVK)	48:16	PB
13	Viktoryia Rashchupkina	Belarus (BLR)	48:21	
14	Anna Clemente	Italy (ITA)	48:25	SB
15	Sandra Nevarez	Mexico (MEX)	49:03	
16	Amanda Cano	Spain (ESP)	49:11	PB
17	Yeseida Carrillo	Colombia (COL)	49:28	
18	Alena Azyrkina	Russia (RUS)	49:32	
19	Laura García-Caro	Spain (ESP)	49:44	PB
21	Rachel Tallent	Australia (AUS)	50:24	
22	Elena Poli	Italy (ITA)	50:28	
23	Heather Lewis	Great Britain (GBR)	50:38	
24	Alena Student	Belarus (BLR)	50:42	
25	Gamze Özgör	Turkey (TUR)	50:45	PB
26	Coralie Mellado	France (FRA)	50:47	
27	Gintarė Vaiciukevičiūtė	Lithuania (LTU)	51:09	
28	Mercédes Marton	Hungary (HUN)	51:10	SB
29	María Pérez	Spain (ESP)	51:15	PB
30	Kristie Goznik	Australia (AUS)	51:26	SB
31	Karolina Wierus	Poland (POL)	51:30	
32	Larissa Bueno	Brazil (BRA)	51:33	PB
33	Marlena Chojecka	Poland (POL)	51:46	
34	Barbara Kovács	Hungary (HUN)	52:20	
35	Joanna Bemowska	Poland (POL)	52:21	
36	Yesenia Miranda	El Salvador (ESA)	52:27	
37	Elif Koc	Turkey (TUR)	52:51	
38	Mara Ribeiro	Portugal (POR)	53:02	PB
39	Adéla Frydrychová	Czech Republic (CZE)	53:13	
40	Emilie Tissot	France (FRA)	53:22	SB
41	Filipa Ferreira	Portugal (POR)	53:32	PB
42	Alena Bezsilka	Belarus (BLR)	53:40	
43	Erika Parviainen	Finland (FIN)	54:01	
44	Valentyna Myronchuk	Ukraine (UKR)	55:17	
45	Emma Prendiville	Ireland (IRL)	55:31	
46	Radosveta Simeonova	Bulgaria (BUL)	55:36	
47	Maite Moscoso	United States (USA)	56:44	
48	Abigail Dunn	United States (USA)	59:59	
—	Tasha Webster	Great Britain (GBR)	DNF	
—	Ellie Dooley	Great Britain (GBR)	DNF	

=== Team (Women 10 km Junior) ===
Place	Country	Points
1	Russia	7 pts
2	China	15 pts
3	Ukraine	15 pts
4	Mexico	17 pts
5	Colombia	18 pts
6	Spain	35 pts
7	Italy	36 pts
8	Belarus	37 pts
9	Australia	51 pts
10	Ireland	51 pts
11	Czech Republic	59 pts
12	Hungary	62 pts
13	Turkey	62 pts
14	Poland	64 pts
15	France	66 pts
16	Portugal	79 pts
17	United States	95 pts

== Medal table ==
* Host nation (Russia)

Rank	Nation	Gold	Silver	Bronze	Total
1	Russia*	3	3	1	7
2	China	3	2	3	8
3	Colombia	2	1	0	3
4	Spain	1	1	0	2
5	Australia	1	0	1	2
6	Ukraine	0	2	2	4
7	Mexico	0	1	2	3
8	Germany	0	0	1	1
Totals (8 entries)		10	10	10	30

- Note: Totals include both individual and team medals, with medals in the team competition counting as one medal.

== Participation ==
The participation of 475 athletes from 62 countries was officially announced. An unofficial count yields the participation of only 449 athletes from 61 countries. The announced athlete from Nigeria did not appear in the result lists.

- Algeria (3)
- Argentina (2)
- Australia (16)
- Belarus (20)
- Bolivia (2)
- Brazil (8)
- Bulgaria (2)
- Canada (7)
- Chile (2)
- China (20)
- Colombia (14)
- Democratic Republic of the Congo (1)
- Costa Rica (2)
- Czech Republic (7)
- Ecuador (16)
- Egypt (4)
- El Salvador (1)
- Estonia (3)
- Finland (7)
- France (16)
- Germany (9)
- Guatemala (7)
- Hong Kong (1)
- Hungary (11)
- India (10)
- Iran (2)
- Ireland (11)
- Italy (18)
- Japan (6)
- Kazakhstan (8)
- Latvia (6)
- Lebanon (1)
- Lithuania (6)
- Malaysia (1)
- Mauritius (1)
- Mexico (16)
- Moldova (2)
- Netherlands (1)
- Norway (2)
- Palestine (1)
- Peru (2)
- Poland (21)
- Portugal (16)
- Romania (7)
- Russia (21)
- Serbia (3)
- Singapore (1)
- Slovakia (2)
- Slovenia (1)
- South Africa (6)
- South Korea (5)
- Spain (20)
- Sweden (3)
- Switzerland (3)
- Tajikistan (2)
- Tunisia (4)
- Turkey (10)
- Ukraine (21)
- United Kingdom (10)
- United States (17)
- Venezuela (1)

== See also ==
- 2012 Race Walking Year Ranking
