= Athletics at the 2016 Summer Olympics – Men's 50 kilometres walk =

Men's 50 kilometres walk at the Games of the XXXI Olympiad
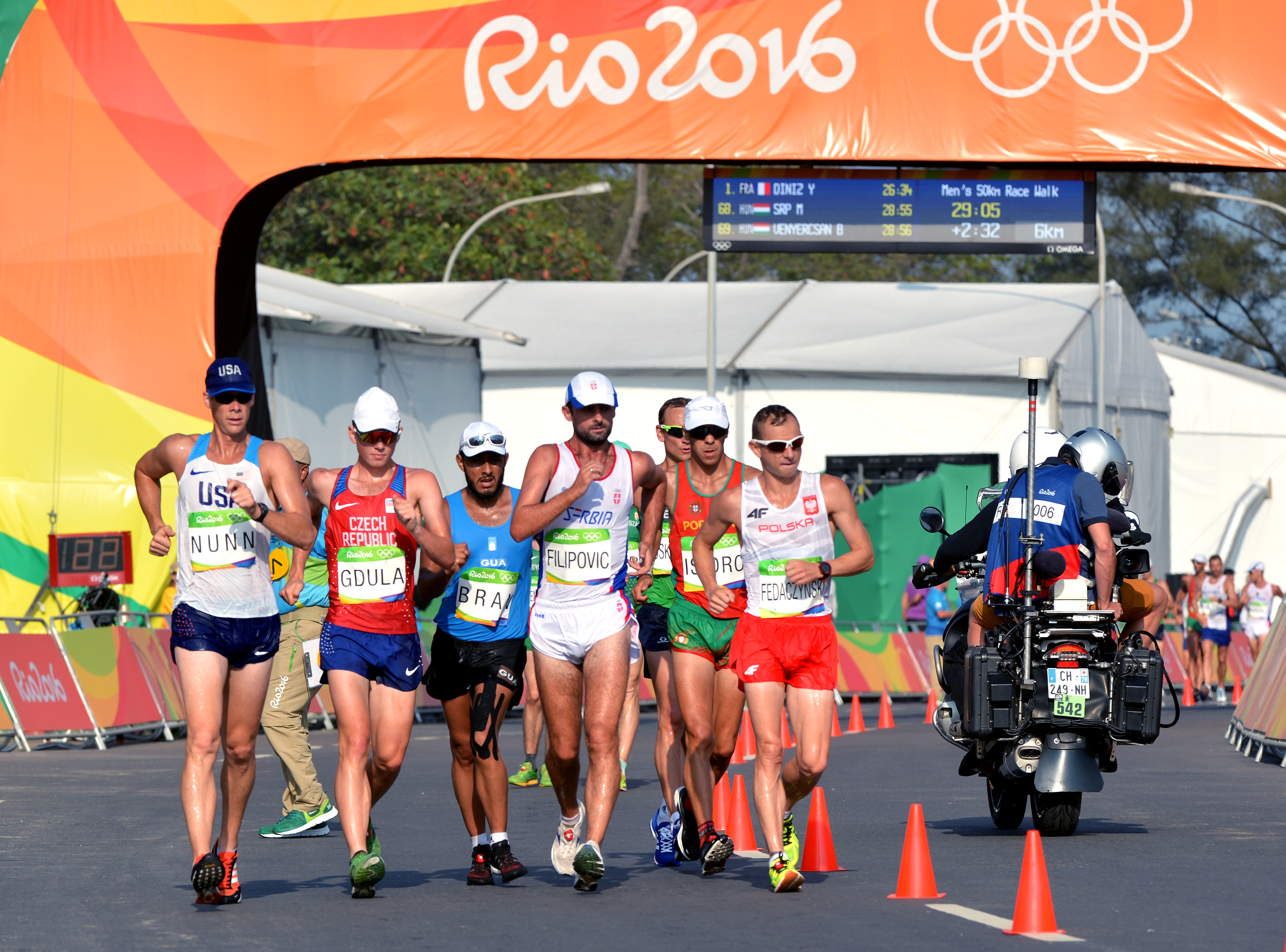
- View of a chasing group during the men's 50 kilometres walk
- Venue: Pontal
- Date: 19 August 2016
- Competitors: 63 from 35 nations
- Winning time: 3:40:58

Medalists
1st place, gold medalist(s)		Matej Tóth	Slovakia
2nd place, silver medalist(s)		Jared Tallent	Australia
3rd place, bronze medalist(s)		Hirooki Arai	Japan

The men's 50 kilometres race walk at the 2016 Olympic Games in Rio de Janeiro was held on 19 August. Matej Tóth, winner of the 2015 World Championships from Slovakia won the gold medal, reigning Olympic champion Jared Tallent from Australia finished second and Japanese walker Hirooki Arai took the bronze. The winning time was 3:40:58.

Canadian Evan Dunfee was awarded the bronze medal after Athletics Canada successfully filed a protest because Arai had made contact with Dunfee in the last 2 km of race, but the Japanese committee appealed the decision, and the medal was reinstated for Arai.

== Summary ==
Off the start line, Vladimir Savanović went for the lead putting an immediate gap on the field and getting four minutes of worldwide television time. Before the first kilometre was over, world record holder Yohann Diniz lost his tolerance for the breakaway and went after Savanović, quickly bridging the gap. Savanovic was already showing signs of fading and disappeared back into the pack. Diniz stayed out front. Over the first 4 kilometres, the race broke up, with a lead pack of about nine separating from the larger pack of the field, with a smaller group of four stuck in between. The lead pack at 5K, already 29 seconds behind Diniz, consisted of Matej Tóth, Jared Tallent Evan Dunfee, Robert Heffernan, Andres Chocho, Horacio Nava, Yu Wei, Takayuki Tanii and Matteo Giupponi. Hirooki Arai bridged the gap and joined the lead pack.

The gap stayed consistent through 10K, but the next 5K, Diniz accelerated his pace, opening up the gap to 55 seconds. Diniz began to pick up lapped walkers already. By 20K, the pack was 1:24 behind Diniz and had over 2 minutes on the next group, with no stragglers in between. Leading up to the half way mark, Toth made a test surge, but Dunfee and the rest of the pack pulled it back except Tanii who fell off the back. Diniz had a 1:41 advantage at half way. Dunfee was the next to attack, picking up the pace by some 20 seconds over the next 5K. The back began to string out behind with Toth trying to cover the move, Tallent leading Heffernan, Arai, Yu and Chocho as the others remaining in contact. Dunfee broke away from the pack and continued to take time out of the gap to Diniz, bringing it down to 1:15.

Suddenly at the 33K mark, Diniz stopped in front of his coach. For an agonizing 1:15 Diniz stood by the railing. When Dunfee arrived, he patted Diniz on the pack and Diniz joined Dunfee in the lead. It was only until the next water stop that Diniz was able to struggle to stay with Dunfee, then the gap began to grow. Within the next half kilometre Chocho was shown the red paddle, asking him off the course. Before the 35K mark, Heffernan began to lose contact, further shrinking the pack. Diniz was caught by the next water stop, where he tried to join the back of the pack. Another 2 minutes and Diniz stopped again, falling backward onto the pavement, lying on the street. Attendants rushed to him with ice and water. Within 30 seconds, Diniz was back on his feet racing, now well behind the pack of four (Toth, Tallent, Arai and Yu) and even the straggler Heffernan. Coming in to the 39K mark, the pack quickly pulled in Dunfee. During the next kilometre, Tallent was the next to attack, Arai tried to cover the move for a short distance but fell back to the pack. With the new injection of speed, Yu fell off the back. With Tallent pulling away, Toth and Arai walked together as Dunfee fell off the back. For the next 7K, Tallent extended his lead. Around 44K, Toth started to separate from Arai.

During the last half of the penultimate lap, Toth noticeably began to gain on Tallent, passing him just before the bell and pulling away. Behind them Dunfee began to see Arai come back into range. Within the next 500 metres, Dunfee had passed Arai. After falling back about 10 metres, Arai surged back on Dunfee but as he passed, Arai didn't use the width of the street, instead almost going deliberately at Dunfee's left side. The two made contact twice, Dunfee being knocked off stride as Arai suddenly gained a 10-metre advantage. A tired Dunfee struggled to find his form. Toth had built up enough of a lead he was celebrating before the crowd, accepting a Slovak flag more than 100 metres before the finish. Arai was gaining on Tallent but Tallent managed to hold his form together long enough to cross six seconds ahead of Arai. Dunfee wobbled across the finish line 14 seconds later, collapsing past the finish line. The first four finished within 40 seconds.

While Toth continued to celebrate on his feet, medical attendants had to deal with the other three finishers exhausted on the ground at the finish line. Another five minutes and four more finishers later, Diniz crossed the finish line after struggling and stopping multiple times. 19 seconds after Diniz, Caio Bonfim crossed the line to a big cheer setting the new Brazilian record. Dunfee had also set the Canadian record. After the race, Athletics Canada filed a protest based on the contact with Arai, resulting in Arai's disqualification with Dunfee being awarded third place and the bronze medal. That decision was then appealed by Japan Association of Athletics Federations and was reversed.

== Schedule ==
All times are Brazil time (UTC−3)

Date	Time	Round
19 August 2016	09:00	Final

== Records ==
Prior to this event, the world and Olympic records stood as follows:

World record	Yohann Diniz (FRA)	3:32:33	Zürich, Switzerland	15 August 2014
Olympic record	Jared Tallent (AUS)	3:36:53	London, Great Britain	11 August 2012
2016 world leading	Yohann Diniz (FRA)	3:37:48	Saint-Sébastien-sur-Loire, France	13 March 2016

== Results ==
Key:	NR	National record	PB	Personal best	SB	Seasonal best	~	Loss of contact	>	Failure to straighten knee

Rank	Name	Nationality	Time	Notes
1st place, gold medalist(s)	Matej Tóth	Slovakia	3:40:58	
2nd place, silver medalist(s)	Jared Tallent	Australia	3:41:16	SB
3rd place, bronze medalist(s)	Hirooki Arai	Japan	3:41:24	SB
4	Evan Dunfee	Canada	3:41:38	NR
5	Yu Wei	China	3:43:00	
6	Robert Heffernan	Ireland	3:43:55	
7	Håvard Haukenes	Norway	3:46:33	PB
8	Yohann Diniz	France	3:46:43	
9	Caio Bonfim	Brazil	3:47:02	NR
10	Chris Erickson	Australia	3:48:40	PB
11	Wang Zhendong	China	3:48:50	
12	Quentin Rew	New Zealand	3:49:32	
13	Horacio Nava	Mexico	3:50:53	~
14	Takayuki Tanii	Japan	3:51:00	~
15	Adrian Blocki	Poland	3:51:31	
16	Omar Zepeda	Mexico	3:51:35	~
17	Jorge Armando Ruiz	Colombia	3:51:42	> PB
18	Serhiy Budza	Ukraine	3:53:22	SB
19	Brendan Boyce	Ireland	3:53:59	
20	Jesús Ángel García	Spain	3:54:29	
21	Marco de Luca	Italy	3:54:40	
22	Rafał Augustyn	Poland	3:55:01	>
23	Jarkko Kinnunen	Finland	3:55:43	
24	Rafał Fedaczyński	Poland	3:55:51	
25	José Leyver Ojeda	Mexico	3:56:07	
26	Dušan Majdán	Slovakia	3:58:25	>> SB
27	Koichiro Morioka	Japan	3:58:59	
28	Alexandros Papamichail	Greece	3:59:21	
29	Jonathan Rieckmann	Brazil	4:01:52	~
30	Ronald Quispe	Bolivia	4:02:00	NR
31	Narcis Stefan Mihaila	Romania	4:02:46	PB
32	Pedro Isidro	Portugal	4:03:42	~
33	Tadas Suskevicius	Lithuania	4:04:10	
34	Rolando Saquipay	Ecuador	4:07:29	
35	Sandeep Kumar	India	4:07:55	~
36	Miguel Carvalho	Portugal	4:08:16	
37	Arnis Rumbenieks	Latvia	4:08:28	
38	Marc Mundell	South Africa	4:11:03	
39	Ivan Banzeruk	Ukraine	4:11:51	
40	Brendon Reading	Australia	4:13:02	
41	Mario Alfonso Bran	Guatemala	4:15:14	>
42	Vladimir Savanović	Serbia	4:15:53	
43	John Nunn	United States	4:16:12	
44	Bence Venyercsán	Hungary	4:19:15	
45	Claudio Villanueva	Ecuador	4:19:33	
46	Nenad Filipovic	Serbia	4:25:41	
47	Han Yucheng	China	4:32:35	>>
48	Pavel Chihuán	Peru	4:32:37	>
49	Predrag Filipović	Serbia	4:39:48	>
–	Kim Hyun-sub	South Korea	DNF	
–	Ivan Trotski	Belarus	DNF	>
–	Ihor Hlavan	Ukraine	DNF	
–	Miguel Ángel López	Spain	DNF	
–	Carl Dohmann	Germany	DNF	
–	Hagen Pohle	Germany	DNF	>
–	Matteo Giupponi	Italy	DNF	
–	Mathieu Bilodeau	Canada	DNF	
–	Artur Mastianica	Lithuania	DNF	
–	José Leonardo Montaña	Colombia	DNF	>~
–	Alex Wright	Ireland	DNF	
–	Jose Ignacio Diaz	Spain	DNF	>>
–	Marius Cocioran	Romania	DNF	
–	Sándor Rácz	Hungary	DNF	
–	Luis Henry Campos	Peru	DNF	>>
–	Mário dos Santos	Brazil	DNF	
–	Veli-Matti Partanen	Finland	DNF	
–	Yerenman Salazar	Venezuela	DNF	
–	Joao Vieira	Portugal	DNF	
–	Edward Araya	Chile	DQ	>>~ R 230.7a
–	Teodorico Caporaso	Italy	DQ	~ ~ ~ R 230.7a
–	Andres Chocho	Ecuador	DQ	~ ~ ~ R 230.7a
–	Lukáš Gdula	Czech Republic	DQ	>>> R 230.7a
–	Dominic King	Great Britain	DQ	>>> R 230.7a
–	Luis Lopez	El Salvador	DQ	>~~ R 230.7a
–	Aleksi Ojala	Finland	DQ	>>> R 230.7a
–	Park Chil-sung	South Korea	DQ	~ ~ ~ R 230.7a
–	Jaime Quiyuch	Guatemala	DQ	>~> R 230.7a
–	James Rendon	Colombia	DQ	~ ~ ~ R 230.7a
–	Miklós Srp	Hungary	DQ	>~> R 230.7a
–	Martin Tišťan	Slovakia	DQ	>>> R 230.7a
