= 2011 World Championships in Athletics – Men's 50 kilometres walk =

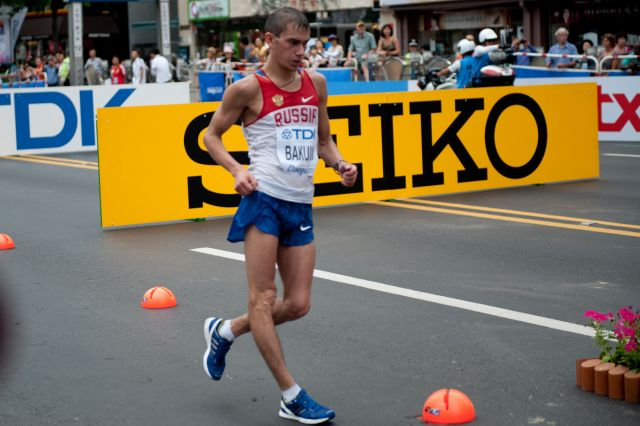
Sergey Bakulin during the 50 km racewalk at Daegu

The Men's 50 kilometres race walk event at the 2011 World Championships in Athletics was held on September 3 on a loop course starting and finishing at Gukchae – bosang Memorial Park in the center of Daegu.

Yohann Diniz took the early lead, challenged by Nathan Deakes until Diniz was disqualified. Deakes continued to lead by as much as 30 seconds over Sergey Bakulin but began to falter with hamstring problems. First he was passed by Bakulin before dropping out. Bakulin stretched out to almost a 2-minute lead, between 40 and 45 km, only Jared Tallent looked like he had a chance, gaining several seconds per kilometer but not really enough to make a dent in the huge lead. Tallent paid for the extra effort trying to chase the leader, slowing considerably on the final 2 km lap, being passed by world record holder Denis Nizhegorodov. Bakulin would later be found Guilty of Doping and have the Gold Stripped from him and handed to Nizhegorodov. Nizhegorodov is also currently under suspicion of Doping, with his B Sample yet to be tested, after his A Sample Tested Positive. Nizhegorodov, still currently holds the Gold Medal as of May 2016.

== Medalists ==
Gold	Silver	Bronze
Denis Nizhegorodov; Russia	Jared Tallent; Australia	Si Tianfeng; China

== Records ==
World record	Denis Nizhegorodov (RUS)	3:34:14	Cheboksary, Russia	11 May 2008
Championship record	Robert Korzeniowski (POL)	3:36:03	Paris, France	27 August 2003
World Leading	Sergey Bakulin (RUS)	3:38:46	Saransk, Russia	12 June 2011
African record	Hatem Ghoula (TUN)	3:58:44	Santa Eulària des Riu, Spain	4 March 2007
Asian record	Yu Chaohong (CHN)	3:36:06	Nanjing, China	22 October 2005
North, Central American and Caribbean record	Raúl González (MEX)	3:41:20	Poděbrady, Czechoslovakia	11 June 1978
South American record	Xavier Moreno (ECU)	3:52:07	Rio de Janeiro, Brazil	28 July 2007
European record	Denis Nizhegorodov (RUS)	3:34:14	Cheboksary, Russia	11 May 2008
Oceanian record	Nathan Deakes (AUS)	3:35:47	Geelong, Australia	2 December 2006

== Qualification standards ==
A time	B time
3:58:00	4:09:00

== Schedule ==
Date	Time	Round
September 3, 2011	08:00	Final

== Results ==
KEY:	q	Fastest non-qualifiers	Q	Qualified	NR	National record	PB	Personal best	SB	Seasonal best

=== Final ===
Rank	Athlete	Nationality	Time	Notes
1st place, gold medalist(s)	Denis Nizhegorodov	Russia	3:42:45	SB
2nd place, silver medalist(s)	Jared Tallent	Australia	3:43:36	SB
3rd place, bronze medalist(s)	Si Tianfeng	China	3:44:40	
4	Luke Adams	Australia	3:45:41	SB
5	Kōichirō Morioka	Japan	3:46:21	
6	Park Chil-sung	South Korea	3:47:13	NR
7	Xu Faguang	China	3:47:19	
8	Takayuki Tanii	Japan	3:48:03	SB
9	Hirooki Arai	Japan	3:48:40	PB
10	Andrés Chocho	Ecuador	3:49:32	AR
11	Marco De Luca	Italy	3:49:40	SB
12	Rafał Sikora	Poland	3:50:24	
13	Kim Dong-Young	South Korea	3:51:12	PB
14	Jarkko Kinnunen	Finland	3:52:32	SB
15	Jean-Jacques Nkouloukidi	Italy	3:52:35	PB
16	Trond Nymark	Norway	3:54:26	SB
17	Édgar Hernández	Mexico	3:54:46	SB
18	José Leyver	Mexico	3:55:37	
19	Oleksiy Kazanin	Ukraine	3:56:18	SB
20	Omar Zepeda	Mexico	3:56:41	
21	Andreas Gustafsson	Sweden	4:00:05	SB
22	Bertrand Moulinet	France	4:07:58	
23	Quentin Rew	New Zealand	4:08:46	
24	Li Jianbo	China	4:10:26	
	Jesús Ángel García	Spain	DSQ	
	Mikel Odriozola	Spain	DSQ	
	Antti Kempas	Finland	DSQ	
	Yohann Diniz	France	DSQ	
	Cédric Houssaye	France	DSQ	
	Colin Griffin	Ireland	DSQ	
	Yim Jung-hyun	South Korea	DSQ	
	Tadas Šuškevičius	Lithuania	DSQ	
	Rafał Fedaczyński	Poland	DSQ	
	Igor Erokhin	Russia	DSQ	
	Nenad Filipović	Serbia	DSQ	
	Miloš Bátovský	Slovakia	DSQ	
	Nathan Deakes	Australia	DNF	
	José Ignacio Díaz	Spain	DNF	
	Igors Kazakēvičs	Latvia	DNF	
	Grzegorz Sudoł	Poland	DNF	
	Sergey Kirdyapkin	Russia	DNF	
	Matej Tóth	Slovakia	DNF	
	Christopher Linke	Germany	DNS	
	Robert Heffernan	Ireland	DNS	
DSQ	Sergey Bakulin	Russia	~~3:41:24~~	doping
