= Athletics at the 2014 Asian Games – Men's 50 kilometres walk =

Men's 50 kilometres walk at the 2014 Asian Games
- Venue: Incheon Asiad Main Stadium
- Dates: 1 October 2014
- Competitors: 7 from 4 nations

Medalists
gold medal	Takayuki Tanii	Japan
silver medal	Park Chil-sung	South Korea
bronze medal	Wang Zhendong	China

The men's 50 kilometres walk event at the 2014 Asian Games was held on the streets of Incheon, South Korea on 1 October.

== Schedule ==
All times are Korea Standard Time (UTC+09:00)

Date	Time	Event
Wednesday, 1 October 2014	07:00	Final

== Records ==
Prior to this competition, the existing world, Asian and Games records were as follows.

World Record	Yohann Diniz (FRA)	3:32:33	Zurich, Switzerland	15 August 2014
Asian Record	Yu Chaohong (CHN)	3:36:06	Nanjing, China	22 October 2005
Games Record	Si Tianfeng (CHN)	3:47:04	Guangzhou, China	25 November 2010

== Results ==
Legend

- DSQ — Disqualified

Rank	Athlete	Time	Notes
1st place, gold medalist(s)	Takayuki Tanii (JPN)	3:40:19	GR
2nd place, silver medalist(s)	Park Chil-sung (KOR)	3:49:15	
3rd place, bronze medalist(s)	Wang Zhendong (CHN)	3:50:52	
4	Sandeep Kumar (IND)	3:59:31	
5	Basanta Bahadur Rana (IND)	4:07:06	
6	Zhang Lin (CHN)	4:08:05	
—	Yuki Yamazaki (JPN)	DSQ	
