= Athletics at the 2026 Asian Games – Men's marathon race walk =

Men's marathon race walk at the 2026 Asian Games
- Venue: Aichi-Nagoya Race Walking Course, Aichi Prefecture
- Date: 27 September 2026
- Competitors: 7 from 5 nations
- Winning time: 3:03:36 SB

Medalists
gold medal	Hayato Katsuki	Japan
silver medal	Zhou Yingcheng	China
bronze medal	Motofumi Suwa	Japan

The men's marathon race walk competition at the 2026 Asian Games took place on 27 September 2026 at the Aichi-Nagoya Race Walking Course in Aichi Prefecture, Japan.

== Schedule ==
All times are Japan Standard Time (UTC+09:00)

Schedule
Date	Time	Event
27 September	07:30	Final

== Results ==
Key:	~ Red card for loss of contact	> Red card for bent knee

Place	Athlete	Nation	Time	Red cards	Notes
1st place, gold medalist(s)	Hayato Katsuki	Japan	3:03:36	>	SB
2nd place, silver medalist(s)	Zhou Yingcheng	China	3:06:40	~>	
3rd place, bronze medalist(s)	Motofumi Suwa	Japan	3:08:57	>>>	
4	Tang Yushuai	China	3:13:54	~>~	
5	Joo Hyun-myeong	South Korea	3:14:31	~~~	
6	Georgiy Sheiko	Kazakhstan	3:16:02	~~	
—	Nathaniel Seiler	Philippines	DQ	>~~~	TR54.7.5
