= Wang Qin =

Wang Qing may refers to:

- Wang Qinruo#In fiction
- Wang Qin (racewalker)
