= Athletics at the 2010 Asian Games – Men's 50 kilometres walk =

Men's 50 kilometres walk at the 2010 Asian Games
- Venue: Aoti Main Stadium
- Date: 27 November 2010
- Competitors: 5 from 3 nations

Medalists
gold medal	Si Tianfeng	China
silver medal	Li Lei	China
bronze medal	Koichiro Morioka	Japan

The men's 50 kilometres walk event at the 2010 Asian Games was held in Aoti Main Stadium, Guangzhou, China on 27 November.

== Schedule ==
All times are China Standard Time (UTC+08:00)

Date	Time	Event
Thursday, 25 November 2010	07:30	Final

== Records ==
Prior to this competition, the existing world, Asian and Games records were as follows.

World Record	Denis Nizhegorodov (RUS)	3:34:14	Cheboksary, Russia	11 May 2008
Asian Record	Yu Chaohong (CHN)	3:36:06	Nanjing, China	22 October 2005
Games Record	Sergey Korepanov (KAZ)	3:54:37	Hiroshima, Japan	15 October 1994

== Results ==
Rank	Athlete	Time	Notes
1st place, gold medalist(s)	Si Tianfeng (CHN)	3:47:04	GR
2nd place, silver medalist(s)	Li Lei (CHN)	3:47:34	
3rd place, bronze medalist(s)	Koichiro Morioka (JPN)	3:47:41	
4	Yim Jung-hyun (KOR)	3:53:24	
5	Kim Dong-young (KOR)	3:53:52	
