= Athletics at the 2012 Summer Olympics – Men's 50 kilometres walk =

Men's 50 kilometres walk at the Games of the XXX Olympiad
- Venue: The Mall
- Date: 11 August
- Competitors: 63 from 35 nations
- Winning time: 3:36:53 OR

Medalists
| 1st place, gold medalist(s) | | Jared Tallent | Australia |
| 2nd place, silver medalist(s) | | Si Tianfeng | China |
| 3rd place, bronze medalist(s) | | Robert Heffernan | Ireland |

Official Video Highlights

The men's 50 kilometres race walk at the 2012 Olympic Games in London was held on 11 August on a route along The Mall and Constitution Hill. The event was marred by the disqualification of all three Russian athletes due to doping violations.

== Summary ==
With 63 starters, there was a large pack at the start, Matej Tóth walking along the side barrier was the first to take the front. By first water stop former world champion Sergey Kirdyapkin and reigning world champion Sergey Bakulin moved to front, with 3 Australians and two Guatemalans among the dozen athletes lined up behind in the lead pack. Si Tianfeng and Yohann Diniz were always just off the lead. At about 18K the pack lost one member as Yuki Yamazaki was given the red paddle taking the pack down to 10, a group 49 seconds ahead of the next competitor Robert Heffernan at 20K in 1:27:44.

At the halfway mark in 1:49:21 Nathan Deakes briefly took the lead, but was then overtaken by Bakulin with Deakes and Erick Barrondo on his shoulder. The leaders were reduced again at the 2 hour mark when Jaime Quiyuch was red paddled. Around 28K Bakulin created a gap, with Barrondo the only chaser, but at that point he already collected 2 red cards. The two leaders hit 30K in 2:10:49, over the next 2K lap, Deakes moved up to the lead group. Another lap, Diniz and Igor Yerokhin joined the group. Barrondo fell off the back of the lead group as Si had joined the pack.

Shortly after 35K Si made a break as he separated from the group gaining as much as a 20-second advantage. From off the pace, previous silver medalist, walking with two red cards himself Jared Tallent passed the slowing Barrondo (who was eventually disqualified) to gain on the group ahead. Deakes fell off the back of the pack as the Australians exchanged positions. Passing Tallent, Kirdyapkin was gaining back on the pack to join the other two Russians and Diniz, launching a group charge after Si.

In the next lap, Diniz was walking along the audience side of the course, while the rest of the Russian group walked down the center of the lane. Inexplicably, Diniz seemed to trip on the barricade alongside the course, crashing to the ground. Dazed on the ground, he did return to walking but later took a break at a water stop, the competition pulling away. He finished the race but was disqualified for taking drinks outside of the designated zone. Shortly after the crash, the three Russians went past Si. Behind the pack, Tallent gained on Si falling behind the pack. Kiryapkin broke away from his teammates. Si resurged to pass the other two Russians with Tallent right behind him. Around 42K, Barrondo was DQed Tallent and Si were battling for second place with Bakulin a dozen seconds behind but fading. Kirdyapkin continued to increase his lead, squashing the Olympic record by more than a minute. 54 seconds behind Tallent also beat the previous record for silver. Si another 100 metres back held on for bronze. Remarkably Heffernan came from well off the pace to catch and out-sprint Yerokhin who had passed his teammate. Heffernan had a new Irish National Record. Five other athletes set national records behind.

== Doping and disqualifications ==
Following the Olympics, Yerokhin's results were struck out due to a doping ban imposed based on previous tests, as with Kirdyapkin, who also received a doping ban following the Olympics.

In a wide-ranging investigation of Russian race walking involving some 30 athletes coached by Viktor Chegin and the Russian anti-doping agency RUSADA, IAAF officials questioned the curious gap in the period of time of Kirdyapkin's RUSADA doping bans that allowed him to keep his gold medal.

The IAAF filed a case with the Court of Arbitration in Lausanne, Switzerland, and on 24 March 2016 the court decided to annul his results dating back to 2009, meaning he was stripped of his gold medal.

Accordingly, Tallent was awarded the gold medal by the IOC at a ceremony in Melbourne, Australia, on 17 June 2016, with Si claiming silver and Heffernan bronze. Tallent was also credited with the Olympic record.

Defending Olympic champion Alex Schwazer was excluded from the event by the Italian National Olympic Committee after he failed a doping test.

== Schedule ==
All times are British Summer Time (UTC+1)

| Date | Time | Round |
|---|---|---|
| 11 August 2012 | 09:00 | Final |

== Records ==
Prior to this event, the world and Olympic records stood as follows:

| World record | Denis Nizhegorodov (RUS) | 3:34:14 | Cheboksary, Russia | 11 May 2008 |
| Olympic record | Alex Schwazer (ITA) | 3:37:09 | Beijing, China | 22 August 2008 |
| 2012 world leading | Jared Tallent (AUS) | 3:40:32 | Saransk, Russia | 13 May 2012 |

The world leading time and Olympic record were originally credited to Sergey Kirdyapkin, but were both annulled after he was found guilty of doping violations. The Olympic record was consequently credited to Tallent.

| Date | Event | Athlete | Time | Notes |
|---|---|---|---|---|
| 11 August | Final | Jared Tallent (AUS) | 3:36:53 | OR |

The following national records were set during this competition:

| Ireland national record | Robert Heffernan (IRL) | 3:37.54 |
| South Korea national record | Park Chil-sung (KOR) | 3:45.55 |
| El Salvador national record | Emerson Hernandez (ESA) | 3:53.47 |
| Greece national record | Alexandros Papamichail (GRE) | 3:49.56 |
| South Africa national record | Marc Mundell (RSA) | 3:55.32 |
| India national record | Basanta Bahadur Rana (IND) | 3:56.48 |

The following area record was set during the competition.

| African record | Marc Mundell (RSA) | 3:55.32 |

== Result ==
| Rank | Athlete | Nationality | Time | Notes |
|---|---|---|---|---|
| 1st place, gold medalist(s) | Jared Tallent | Australia | 3:36:53 | OR, PB |
| 2nd place, silver medalist(s) | Si Tianfeng | China | 3:37:16 | PB |
| 3rd place, bronze medalist(s) | Robert Heffernan | Ireland | 3:37:54 | NR |
| 4 | Li Jianbo | China | 3:39:01 | PB |
| 5 | Matej Tóth | Slovakia | 3:41:24 | |
| 6 | Łukasz Nowak | Poland | 3:42:47 | PB |
| 7 | Kōichirō Morioka | Japan | 3:43:14 | PB |
| 8 | André Höhne | Germany | 3:44:26 | SB |
| 9 | Bertrand Moulinet | France | 3:45:35 | PB |
| 10 | Park Chil-sung | South Korea | 3:45:55 | NR |
| 11 | Ivan Trotski | Belarus | 3:46:09 | PB |
| 12 | Jarkko Kinnunen | Finland | 3:46:25 | PB |
| 13 | Horacio Nava | Mexico | 3:46:59 | SB |
| 14 | Marco De Luca | Italy | 3:47:19 | SB |
| 15 | Rafał Sikora | Poland | 3:47:47 | |
| 16 | Ihor Hlavan | Ukraine | 3:48:07 | PB |
| 17 | Jesús Ángel García | Spain | 3:48:32 | |
| 18 | Trond Nymark | Norway | 3:48:37 | SB |
| 19 | Nathan Deakes | Australia | 3:48:45 | |
| 20 | Omar Zepeda | Mexico | 3:49:14 | |
| 21 | Christopher Linke | Germany | 3:49:19 | |
| 22 | Alexandros Papamihail | Greece | 3:49:56 | NR |
| 23 | Luke Adams | Australia | 3:53:41 | |
| 24 | Emerson Hernandez | El Salvador | 3:53:57 | NR |
| 25 | José Leyver | Mexico | 3:55:00 | |
| 26 | Brendan Boyce | Ireland | 3:55:01 | PB |
| 27 | Quentin Rew | New Zealand | 3:55:03 | PB |
| 28 | Cédric Houssaye | France | 3:55:16 | |
| 29 | Marc Mundell | South Africa | 3:55:32 | AR |
| 30 | Fredy Hernández | Colombia | 3:56:00 | PB |
| 31 | Yim Junghyun | South Korea | 3:56:34 | SB |
| 32 | Serhiy Budza | Ukraine | 3:56:35 | |
| 33 | Basanta Bahadur Rana | India | 3:56:48 | NR |
| 34 | Zhao Jianguo | China | 3:56:59 | |
| 35 | Kim Dong-Young | South Korea | 3:57:33 | |
| 36 | Marius Cocioran | Romania | 3:57:52 | PB |
| 37 | Pedro Isidro | Portugal | 3:58:59 | |
| 38 | Antti Kempas | Finland | 4:01:50 | |
| 39 | Mikel Odriozola | Spain | 4:02:48 | SB |
| 40 | John Nunn | United States | 4:03:28 | PB |
| 41 | Maciej Rosiewicz | Georgia | 4:05:20 | SB |
| 42 | Igors Kazakevičs | Latvia | 4:06:47 | |
| 43 | Tadas Šuškevičius | Lithuania | 4:08:16 | |
| 44 | Xavier Moreno | Ecuador | 4:09:23 | |
| 45 | Milos Batovsky | Slovakia | 4:09:32 | |
| 46 | Vitaliy Anichkin | Kazakhstan | 4:14:09 | |
| 47 | Benjamin Sánchez | Spain | 4:14:40 | |
| 48 | Dominic King | Great Britain | 4:15:05 | |
| – | Rafał Fedaczyński | Poland | DNF | |
| – | Nenad Filipović | Serbia | DNF | |
| – | Takayuki Tanii | Japan | DNF | |
| – | João Vieira | Portugal | DNF | |
| – | Edward Araya | Chile | DQ | |
| – | Érick Barrondo | Guatemala | DQ | |
| – | Andrés Chocho | Ecuador | DQ | |
| – | Yohann Diniz | France | DQ | |
| – | Colin Griffin | Ireland | DQ | |
| – | Oleksiy Kazanin | Ukraine | DQ | |
| – | Jaime Quiyuch | Guatemala | DQ | |
| – | Yuki Yamazaki | Japan | DQ | |
| – | Sergey Kirdyapkin | Russia | ~~3:35:59~~ | ~~OR~~, DQ |
| – | Igor Yerokhin | Russia | ~~3:37:54~~ | ~~PB~~, DQ |
| – | Sergey Bakulin | Russia | ~~3:38:55~~ | DQ |
