= Brendon Reading =

Australian racewalker

Personal information
- Born: 26 January 1989 (age 37) Canberra

Sport
- Country: Australia
- Sport: Track and field athletics
- Event: Racewalking

Brendon Reading (born 26 January 1989) is an Australian racewalker. He competed at the 2016 Summer Olympics in Rio de Janeiro, in the men's 50 kilometres walk.
