= 2009 Asian Athletics Championships – Men's 20 kilometres walk =

The men's 20 kilometres walk event at the 2009 Asian Athletics Championships was held on November 12.

== Results ==
| Rank | Name | Nationality | Time | Penalties | Notes |
|---|---|---|---|---|---|
| 1st place, gold medalist(s) | Li Jianbo | China | 1:22:55 | > | |
| 2nd place, silver medalist(s) | Zhu Yafei | China | 1:22:56 | | |
| 3rd place, bronze medalist(s) | Park Chil-sung | South Korea | 1:24:51 | ~~ | |
| 4 | Akihiro Sugimoto | Japan | 1:25:00 | | |
| 5 | Babubhai Kesharabhai Panucha | India | 1:25:11 | > | SB |
| 6 | Teoh Boon Lim | Malaysia | 1:32:39 | ~ | |
| 7 | Lo Choon Sieng | Malaysia | 1:35:20 | ~ | |
| 8 | Ayoob Sarwashi | United Arab Emirates | 1:42:15 | | PB |
| | Harminder Singh | India | DQ | ~~~ | |
