= Rafał Sikora =

Polish race walker

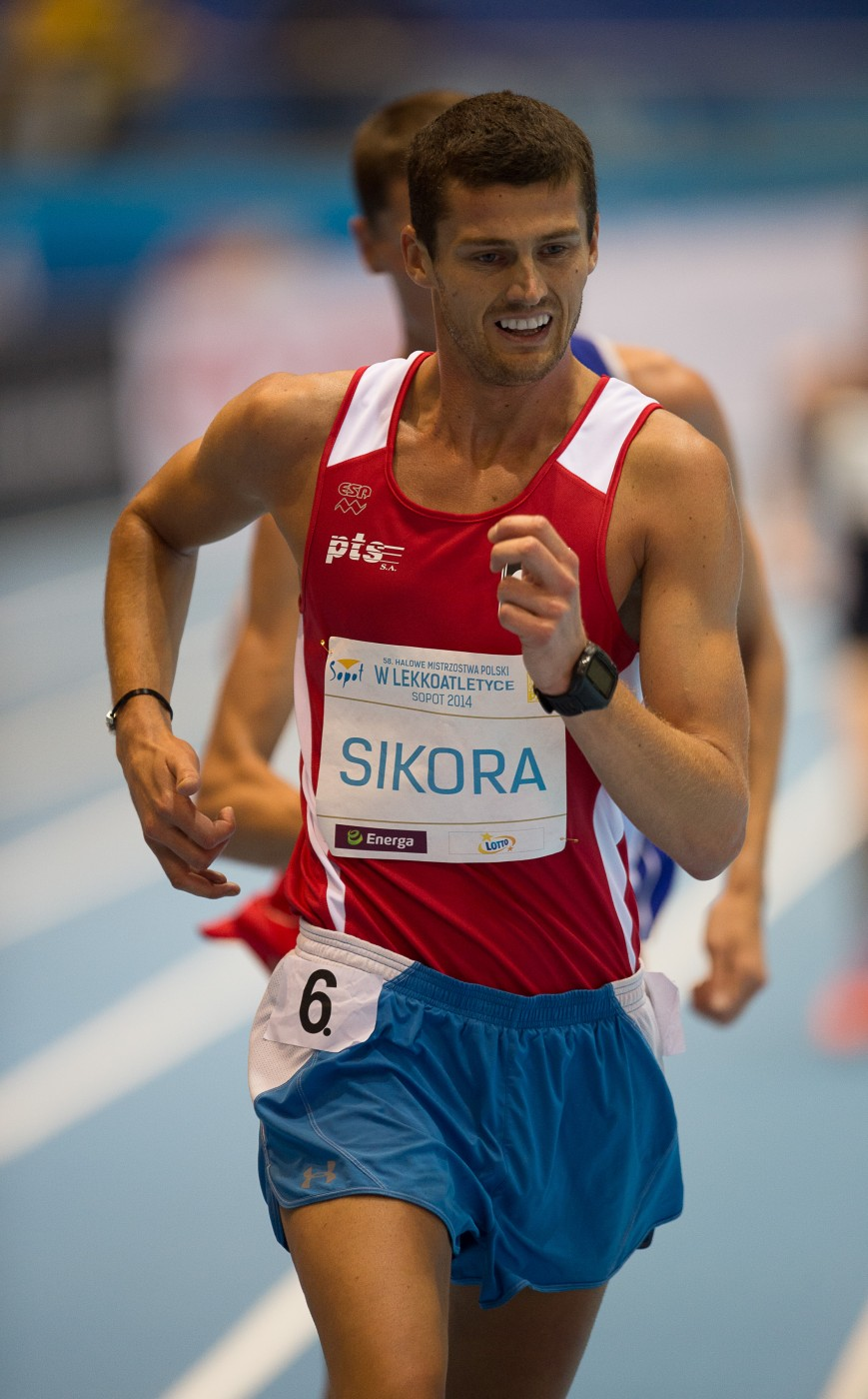
- Rafał Sikora in 2014

Personal information
- Full name: Rafał Józef Sikora
- Nationality: Poland
- Born: 17 February 1987 (age 39) Mielec, Poland
- Height: 1.77 m (5 ft 9 1/2 in)
- Weight: 73 kg (161 lb)

Sport
- Sport: Athletics
- Event: Race walking
- Club: AZS AWF Kraków

Rafał Sikora (born 17 February 1987 in Mielec) is a Polish race walker.

He represented his country at the 2012 Olympic Games in London finishing 18th.

== Competition record ==
Year	Competition	Venue	Position	Event	Notes
Representing Poland
2003	World Youth Championships	Sherbrooke, Canada	7th	10,000 m walk	44:53.49
2005	European Junior Championships	Kaunas, Lithuania	18th	10,000 m walk	46:42.76
2006	World Race Walking Cup (U20)	A Coruña, Spain	13th	10 km walk	44:01
2008	World Race Walking Cup	Cheboksary, Russia	27th	50 km walk	3:59:25
2009	European Race Walking Cup	Metz, France	17th	20 km walk	1:31:00
2009	European Race Walking Cup	Metz, France	3rd	Team - 20 km	40 pts
2009	European U23 Championships	Kaunas, Lithuania	12th	20 km walk	1:27:47
2010	World Race Walking Cup	Chihuahua, Mexico	17th	50 km walk	4:05:02
2011	European Race Walking Cup	Olhão, Portugal	20th	20 km	1:29:52
2011	World Championships	Daegu, South Korea	13th	50 km walk	3:50:24
2012	World Race Walking Cup	Saransk, Russia	14th	50 km walk	3:51:43
2012	Olympic Games	London, United Kingdom	18th	50 km walk	3:47:47
2013	European Race Walking Cup	Dudince, Slovakia	8th	50 km	3:48:13
2013	European Race Walking Cup	Dudince, Slovakia	3rd	Team - 50 km	31 pts
2014	World Race Walking Cup	Taicang, China	76th	20 km	1:26:49
2015	European Race Walking Cup	Murcia, Spain	36th	20 km	1:30:31

== Personal bests ==
Outdoor

- 5000 m walk – 19:38.03 (Katowice 2011)
- 10,000 m walk – 40:30.80 (Warsaw 2010)
- 10 km walk – 41:49 (Kraków 2010)
- 20 km walk – 1:21:04 (Zaniemyśl 2011)
- 50 km walk – 3:46:16 (Dudince 2011)

Indoor

- 5000 m walk – 19:22.15 (Spała 2012)
