= 2010 World Junior Championships in Athletics – Women's 10,000 metres walk =

The women's 10,000 metres race walk at the 2010 World Junior Championships in Athletics was held at the Moncton 2010 Stadium on 21 July. A field of 26 athletes from 19 countries competed.

== Medalists ==
Gold	Silver	Bronze
Elena Lashmanova; Russia	Anna Lukyanova; Russia	Kumiko Okada; Japan

== Records ==
Prior to the competition, the existing world junior and championship records were as follows.

	Name	Nationality	Time	Location	Date
World junior record	Vera Sokolova	Russia	43:11.34	Kaunas	July 21, 2005
Championship record	Tatyana Mineyeva	Russia	43:24.72	Bydgoszcz	July 9, 2008

No new records were established during the competition.

== Results ==
Rank	Name	Nationality	Time	Notes
1st place, gold medalist(s)	Elena Lashmanova	Russia	44:11.90	WJL
2nd place, silver medalist(s)	Anna Lukyanova	Russia	44:17.98	PB
3rd place, bronze medalist(s)	Kumiko Okada	Japan	45:56.15	
4	Qin He	China	46:08.36	PB
5	Antonella Palmisano	Italy	46:08.57	NJR
6	Chiaki Asada	Japan	46:39.93	PB
7	Jing Zhao	China	46:54.90	PB
8	Regan Lamble	Australia	47:55.67	PB
9	Sandra Yerga	Spain	47:57.66	PB
10	Sandra Nevarez	Mexico	48:00.20	PB
11	Federica Curiazzi	Italy	48:11.34	PB
12	Georgiana Enache	Romania	48:29.60	
13	Inès Pastorino	France	48:42.30	PB
14	Charlyne Czychy	Germany	49:00.11	PB
15	Anna Chernenko	Ukraine	49:01.00	
16	Ekateríni Theodoropoúlou	Greece	49:11.23	
17	Sara Alonso	Spain	49:44.28	PB
18	Yuli Capcha	Peru	49:59.96	
19	Emilie Menuet	France	50:20.46	PB
20	Berta Kriván	Hungary	51:39.50	SB
21	Magdalena Jasinska	Poland	52:16.80	SB
22	Linda Paz	El Salvador	52:52.09	NJR
23	Anne Voyer	Canada	59:53.24	
	Paige Hooper	Australia		DSQ IAAF rule 230.6
	Alejandra Ortega	Mexico		DSQ IAAF rule 230.6
	Orouba Omri Al-Ammou	Syria		DNS

Key: DNS = Did not start, DSQ = Disqualified, NJR = National junior record, PB = Personal best, SB = Seasonal best, WJL = World junior leading

== Participation ==
According to an unofficial count, 25 athletes from 17 countries participated in the event.

- Australia (2)
- Canada (1)
- China (2)
- El Salvador (1)
- France (2)
- Germany (1)
- Greece (1)
- Hungary (1)
- Italy (2)
- Japan (2)
- Mexico (2)
- Peru (1)
- Poland (1)
- Romania (1)
- Russia (2)
- Spain (2)
- Ukraine (1)
