= Athletics at the 2019 Summer Universiade – Men's 20 kilometres walk =

The men's 20 kilometres walk event at the 2019 Summer Universiade was held on 12 July in Naples.

== Results ==
=== Individual ===
Official Video

Rank	Name	Nationality	Time	Notes
1st place, gold medalist(s)	Koki Ikeda	Japan	1:22:49	
2nd place, silver medalist(s)	Masatora Kawano	Japan	1:23:20	
3rd place, bronze medalist(s)	Yuta Koga	Japan	1:23:35	
4	Şahin Şenoduncu	Turkey	1:23:40	PB
5	Francesco Fortunato	Italy	1:23:53	
6	Zhang Jun	China	1:24:00	
7	Karl Junghannss	Germany	1:24:54	
8	Gregorio Angelini	Italy	1:25:49	PB
9	Chen Rui	China	1:26:24	
10	Miroslav Úradník	Slovakia	1:27:42	
11	Joo Hyun-myeong	South Korea	1:29:51	
12	Brandon Segura	Mexico	1:30:08	
13	Bence Venyercsán	Hungary	1:34:16	
14	Anatoli Homeleu	Belarus	1:34:42	
15	Kim Ming-yu	South Korea	1:37:02	
16	Kim Nak-hyun	South Korea	1:39:28	
	Neeraj Kumar Chaurasiya	India	DNF	
	Yin Jiaxing	China	DQ	
	Michele Antonelli	Italy	DQ	
	Declan Tingay	Australia	DQ	

=== Team ===
Rank	Team	Time	Notes
1st place, gold medalist(s)	Japan; Koki Ikeda; Masatora Kawano; Yuta Koga	4:09:44	
2nd place, silver medalist(s)	South Korea; Joo Hyun-myeong; Kim Min-gyuu; Kim Nak-hyun	4:46:21	
