= Xu Faguang =

Chinese racewalker (born 1987)

Personal information
- Born: 17 May 1987 (age 38)

Sport
- Country: China
- Sport: Athletics
- Event: 50km Race Walk

Xu Faguang (born 17 May 1987) is a Chinese racewalking athlete who specialises in the 50 kilometres race walk. He has represented his country three times at the World Championships in Athletics (2009, 2011, 2013), with his best finish being seventh in 2011. He is also a three-time participant in the IAAF World Race Walking Team Championships, having entered in 2010, 2012, and 2016. He was a team gold medallist with China in 2010 and 2012.

He won the Chinese University title over 20,000 m in 2012.

== Personal bests ==
- 10 kilometres race walk – 40:03 min (2009)
- 20 kilometres race walk – 1:20:26 (2008)
- 50 kilometres race walk – 3:42:20 (2011)

== International competitions ==
Year	Competition	Venue	Position	Event	Notes
2009	World Championships	Berlin, Germany	10th	50 km walk	3:48:52
2010	World Race Walking Cup	Chihuahua, Mexico	9th	50 km walk	3:57:50
2010	World Race Walking Cup	Chihuahua, Mexico	1st	Team	21 pts
2011	World Championships	Daegu, South Korea	7th	50 km walk	3:47:19
2012	World Race Walking Cup	Saransk, Russia	5th	50 km walk	3:48:47
2012	World Race Walking Cup	Saransk, Russia	1st	Team	28 pts
2013	World Championships	Moscow, Russia	30th	50 km walk	3:57:54
2016	World Race Walking Team Championships	Rome, Italy	19th	50 km walk	4:01:36
