= Hayato Katsuki =

Japanese racewalker (born 1990)

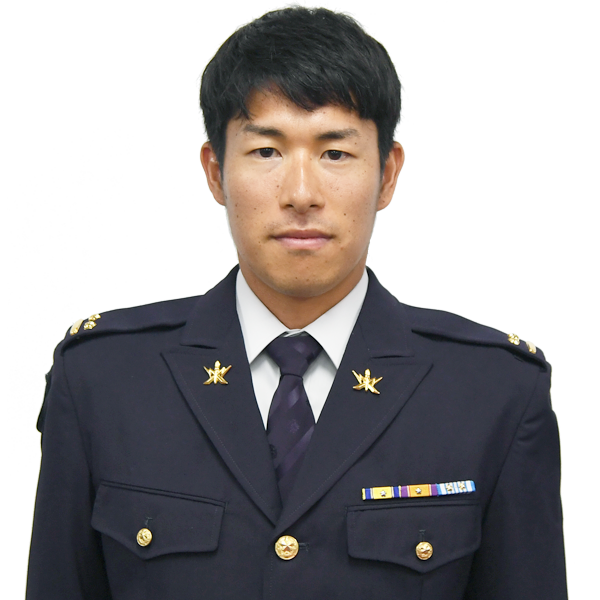

Personal information
- Born: 28 November 1990 (age 35) Ōnojō, Fukuoka Prefecture, Japan

Sport
- Country: Japan
- Sport: Athletics
- Event: Race walking
Medal record
Representing Japan
Men's athletics
World Championships
Bronze medal – third place	2025 Tokyo	35 km walk
World Team Championships
Gold medal – first place	2026 Brasília	Marathon walk
Gold medal – first place	2026 Brasília	Marathon walk (team)
Asian Games
Gold medal – first place	2018 Jakarta	50 km walk
Gold medal – first place	2026 Aichi–Nagoya	Marathon walk

Hayato Katsuki (勝木隼人, born 28 November 1990) is a Japanese racewalker. In 2018, he won the gold medal in the men's 50 kilometres walk event at the 2018 Asian Games held in Jakarta, Indonesia.

== Career ==
At the 2018 IAAF World Race Walking Team Championships he won two medals: the silver medal in the men's 50 km event and the gold medal in the men's 50 km team event. In 2019, he competed in the men's 50 kilometres walk event at the 2019 World Athletics Championships held in Doha, Qatar where he finished in 27th place with a time of 4:46:10.
