= Luis Lopez (Salvadoran race walker) =

Salvadoran racewalker

Personal information
- Born: 18 January 1994 (age 32)

Sport
- Country: El Salvador
- Sport: Athletics

Luis Menjivar Lopez (born 18 January 1994) is a Salvadoran race walker. He competed in the men's 50 kilometre walk at the 2016 Summer Olympics. In that race, held in "punishingly hot and humid conditions", out of a field of 80 walkers, 12 were disqualified, including Lopez, and 19 walkers did not finish.
