= Jaime Quiyuch =

Guatemalan racewalker

Personal information
- Full name: Jaime Daniel Quiyuch Castañeda
- Born: April 22, 1988 (age 38) Guatemala City, Guatemala
- Height: 1.78 m (5 ft 10 in)
- Weight: 57 kg (126 lb)

Sport
- Country: Guatemala
- Sport: Athletics
- Event: Racewalking
Medal record
Representing Guatemala
Pan American Games
Bronze medal – third place	2011 Guadalajara	50km walk
- Updated on 25 December 2014

Jaime Daniel Quiyuch Castañeda (born 24 April 1988 in Guatemala City) is a Guatemalan race walker. He competed in the 50 kilometres walk event at the 2012 and 2016 Summer Olympics.

== Personal bests ==
Event	Result	Venue	Date
Road walk
20 km	1:22:25 hrs	(Switzerland) Lugano	17 Mar 2013
50 km	3:50:33 hrs A	(Mexico) Guadalajara	29 Oct 2011

== Achievements ==
Year	Competition	Venue	Position	Event	Notes
Representing Guatemala
2010	Central American Championships	Guatemala City, Guatemala	3rd	20,000 m track walk	1:31:54.72
2011	Central American Race Walking Cup	San Salvador, El Salvador	2nd	35 km walk	2:48:32
2011	Pan American Games	Guadalajara, Mexico	3rd	50 km walk	3:50:33 A
2012	World Race Walking Cup	Saransk, Russia	–	50 km walk	DNF
2012	Olympic Games	London, United Kingdom	–	50 km walk	DQ
2013	Pan American Race Walking Cup	Guatemala City, Guatemala	7th	20 km walk	1:27:49 A
2013	World Championships	Moscow, Russia	13th	20 km walk	1:23:24
2013	Bolivarian Games	Trujillo, Peru	–	50 km walk	DQ
2014	Central American and Caribbean Games	Xalapa, Mexico	4th	50 km walk	3:55:42 A
2015	World Championships	Beijing, China	29th	50 km	3:57:41
2016	Olympic Games	Rio, Brazil	–	50 km walk	DQ
