= Yu Wei =

Chinese racewalker (born 1987)

Personal information
- Born: 11 September 1987 (age 38)
- Height: 180 cm (5 ft 11 in)
- Weight: 55 kg (121 lb)

Sport
- Country: China
- Sport: Track and field
- Event: Racewalking
- Club: Shandong Province

Achievements and titles
- Olympic finals: 5th, 50 km walk (2016)
- Personal bests: 50 km walk: 3:42:54 (2016); 20 km walk: 1:19:07 (2013)

Yu Wei (于伟; born 11 September 1987) is a male Chinese racewalker.

== Career ==
He competed in the 50 kilometres walk event at the 2015 World Championships in Athletics in Beijing, China.

He competed in the 50 kilometres walk event at the 2016 Olympic Summer Games, finishing 5th.

His personal best of 3:42:54 set in Huangshan on 6 March 2016 ranks him #75 of all time.

== See also ==
- China at the 2015 World Championships in Athletics
