= Athletics at the 2018 Asian Games – Men's 50 kilometres walk =

Men's 50 kilometres walk at the 2018 Asian Games
- Venue: Gelora Bung Karno Stadium
- Date: 30 August 2018
- Competitors: 8 from 5 nations

Medalists
gold medal	Hayato Katsuki	Japan
silver medal	Wang Qin	China
bronze medal	Joo Hyun-myeong	South Korea

The men's 50 kilometres walk competition at the 2018 Asian Games took place on 30 August 2018 at the Gelora Bung Karno Stadium.

== Schedule ==
All times are Western Indonesia Time (UTC+07:00)

Date	Time	Event
Thursday, 30 August 2018	06:00	Final

== Records ==
Prior to this competition, the existing world, Asian and Games records were as follows.

World Record	Yohann Diniz (FRA)	3:32:33	Zurich, Switzerland	15 August 2014
Asian Record	Yu Chaohong (CHN)	3:36:06	Nanjing, China	22 October 2005
Games Record	Takayuki Tanii (JPN)	3:40:19	Incheon, South Korea	1 October 2014

== Results ==
Legend

- DNF — Did not finish
- DSQ — Disqualified

Rank	Athlete	Time	Notes
1st place, gold medalist(s)	Hayato Katsuki (JPN)	4:03:30	
2nd place, silver medalist(s)	Wang Qin (CHN)	4:06:48	
3rd place, bronze medalist(s)	Joo Hyun-myeong (KOR)	4:10:21	
4	Satoshi Maruo (JPN)	4:14:13	
5	Hendro (INA)	4:32:20	
—	Wang Rui (CHN)	DNF	
—	Park Chil-sung (KOR)	DSQ	
—	Sandeep Kumar (IND)	DSQ	
