= Elena Lashmanova =

Russian race walker

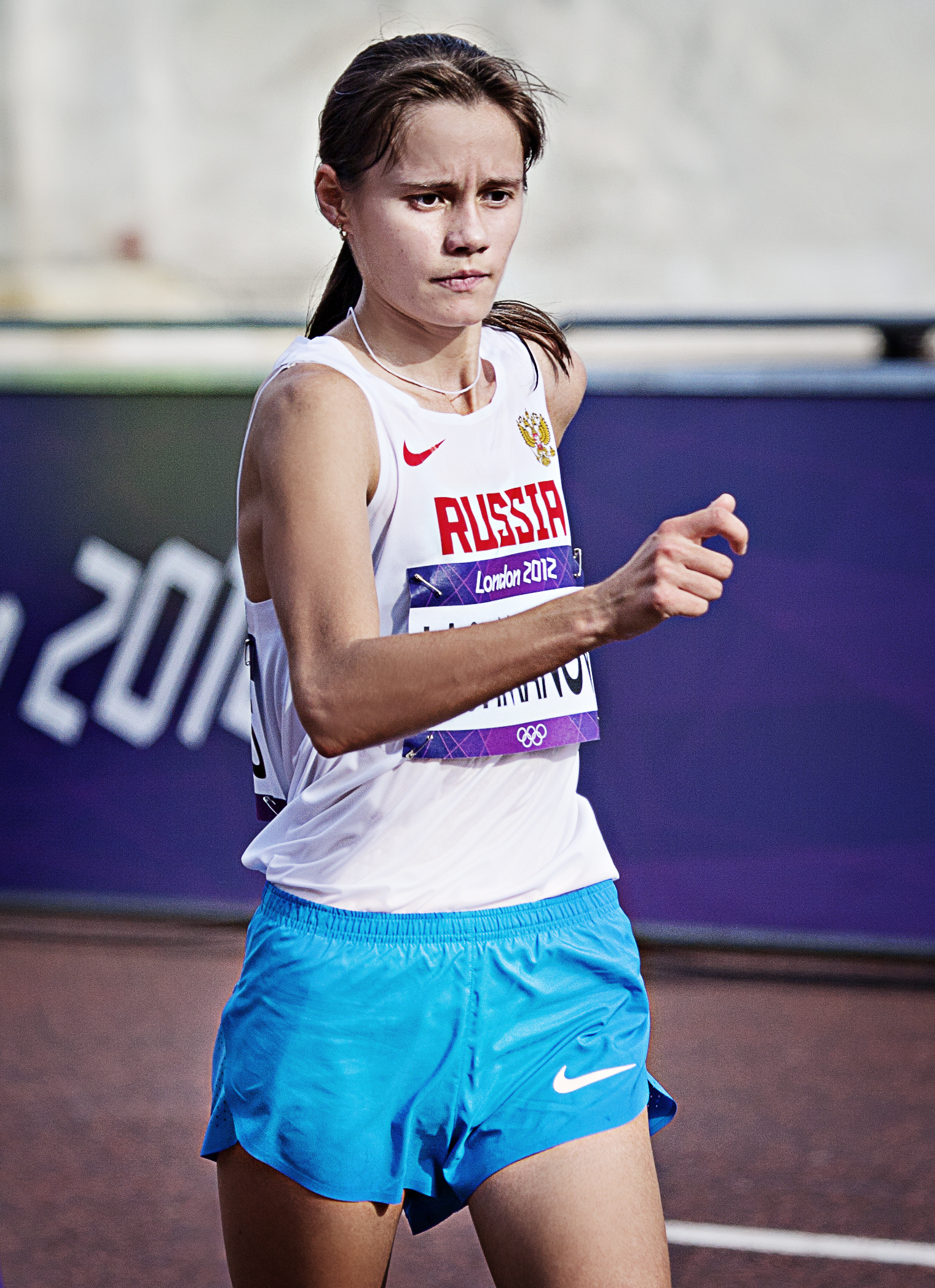

Personal information
- Full name: Elena Anatolyevna Lashmanova
- Nationality: Russian
- Born: 9 April 1992 (age 34) Saransk, Mordovia, Russia
- Height: 1.70 m (5 ft 7 in)
- Weight: 48 kg (106 lb)

Sport
- Country: Russia
- Sport: Track and field
- Event: Racewalking
- Team: Dynamo Saransk
Medal record
Olympic Games
Disqualified	2012 London	20 km walk
World Championships
Disqualified	2013 Moscow	20 km walk
World Race Walking Cup
Disqualified	2012 Saransk	20 km walk

Elena Anatolyevna Lashmanova (Russian: Елена Анатольевна Лашманова, born 9 April 1992 in Saransk, Mordovia) is a Russian former race walker.

== Early career ==
Lashmanova was World Youth, World Junior and European Junior champion in race walking.

== Career ==
Lashmanova won the 20 km walk at the 2012 World Racing Walking Cup in Saransk with a time of 1:27:38.

Later that year in her Olympic debut at the 2012 Summer Olympics in London, Lashmanova won gold in the women's 20 km walk in a world record time of 1:25:02. She defeated defending champion Olga Kaniskina by 7 seconds in a come-from-behind win.

In 2013, she won the 20 km walk at the World Championships in Moscow.

== Doping ==
On 22 June 2014, it was announced that Lashmanova had tested positive for doping with Endurobol, along with a large number of other Russian race-walkers, and would receive a two-year suspension. She would come off of the doping suspension in time to defend her Olympic gold medal. She joined over a dozen other elite Russian race walkers all coached by Viktor Chegin to receive doping suspensions.

She is alleged to have competed on 30 December 2014 despite the drug suspension. If proven, her ban could be extended for a further two years.

In 2021, she received a two-year ban for a doping violation along with a similar penalty for the majority of her compatriot training partners. Her Olympic gold was stripped following an IOC decision in March 2022, with all of her results from February 18, 2012, to January 3, 2014 wiped, following disqualification for doping. This includes her 2013 world title. It is claimed by Russian whistleblower Grigory Rodchenkov that her positive sample (found with the doping compound GW1516) was in fact one from the 2012 Olympics mistakenly substituted for a further positive test result by the state run-doping programme. He claims that she had at least 2 positive findings that went unreported and that this one was reported only because it was witnessed by non-Russian experts.

After Lashmanova's medal was officially stripped, Russia's medal total from the 2012 Olympics was reduced to seven medals and two gold medals (following other reallocations for similar reasons).

== International competitions ==
Year	Competition	Venue	Position	Event	Notes
Representing Russia
2009	World Youth Championships	Brixen, Italy	1st	5000 m track walk	22:55.45
2010	World Junior Championships	Moncton, Canada	1st	10000 m track walk	44:11.90
2011	European Race Walking Cup	Olhão, Portugal	1st	10 km (U20)	43:10
2011	European Race Walking Cup	Olhão, Portugal	1st	Team - 10 km Junior	3 pts
2011	European Junior Championships	Tallinn, Estonia	1st	10000 m track walk	42:59.48 WJR
2012	World Race Walking Cup	Saransk, Russia	DSQ	20 km walk	~~1:27:38~~
2012	Olympic Games	London, United Kingdom	DSQ	20 km walk	~~1:25:02 WR~~
2013	World Championships	Moscow, Russia	DSQ	20 km walk	~~1:27:08~~

== See also ==
- List of doping cases in athletics
