= Wang Qin (race walker) =

Chinese racewalker (born 1994)

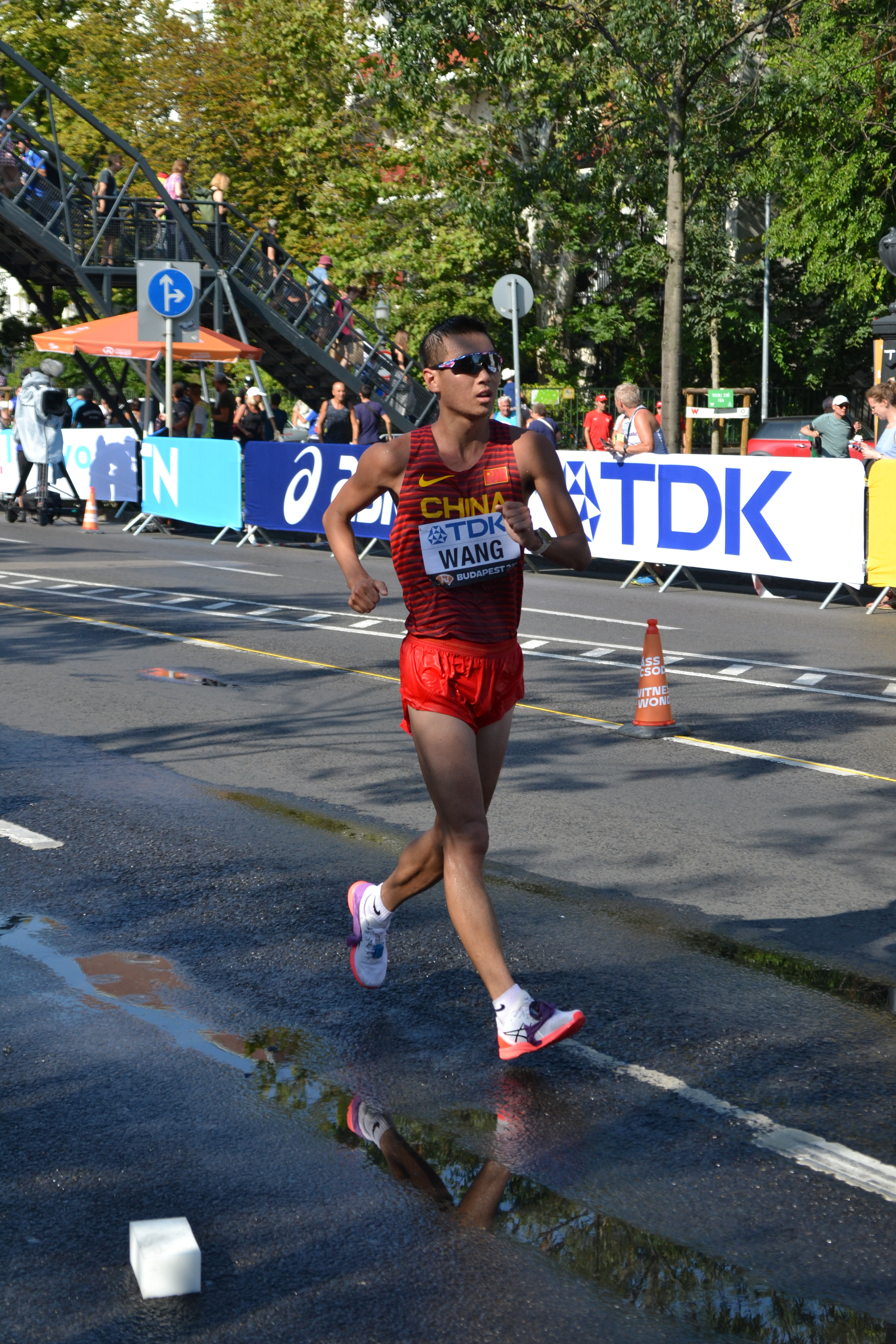

Personal information
- Born: 8 May 1994 (age 32)

Sport
- Country: China
- Sport: Athletics
- Event: Racewalking
Medal record
Representing China
Asian Games
Silver medal – second place	2018 Jakarta	50 km walk

Wang Qin (born 8 May 1994) is a Chinese racewalker. In 2018, he won the silver medal in the men's 50 kilometres walk event at the 2018 Asian Games held in Jakarta, Indonesia.

In 2019, he competed in the men's 50 kilometres walk event at the 2019 World Athletics Championships held in Doha, Qatar where he did not finish his race.

Representing China at the 2020 Summer Olympics in 2021, Wang placed 21st in the men's 50 kilometres walk with a time of 3:59:35.
