= Si Tianfeng =

Chinese racewalker (born 1984)

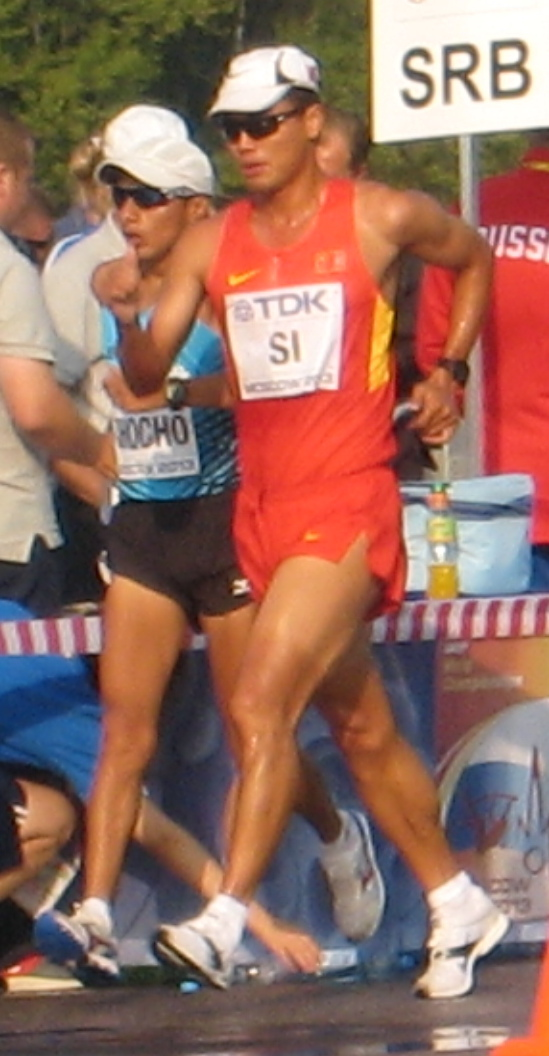
- Si at the 2013 World Championships

Personal information
- Born: June 17, 1984 (age 42)
- Height: 1.82 m (5 ft 11 1/2 in)
- Weight: 60 kg (132 lb)

Sport
- Country: China
- Sport: Athletics
- Event: 50 km Race Walk
Medal record
Men's athletics
Representing China
Olympic Games
Silver medal – second place	2012 London	50 km walk
World Championships
Bronze medal – third place	2011 Daegu	50 km walk
World Race Walking Cup
Silver medal – second place	2012 Saransk	50 km walk
Asian Games
Gold medal – first place	2010 Guangzhou	50 km walk

Si Tianfeng (Chinese: 司天峰, Sī Tiānfēng, born June 17, 1984, in Xintai, Shandong) is a Chinese race walker. He represented China at the 2008 Beijing Olympics, finishing 17th. He also competed in the 50 km walk at the 2009 Chinese National Games and won the bronze medal. Si set a Games record to take the gold medal in the 50 km walk at the 2010 Asian Games. He was fourth at the World Race Walking Cup that year.

He won the Taicang meet on the IAAF Race Walking Challenge in April 2011, but came fourth that was retrospectively upgraded to bronze after the original gold medalist was caught doping at the World Championships that year.

At the 2012 Summer Olympics, he won the silver medal in the men's 50 km race walk, in a personal best of 3:37:16. In May 2012, he also won bronze at the World Racing Cup in Saransk retrospectively upgraded to silver medal after the original gold medalist was disqualified for doping.

== Achievements ==
Year	Competition	Venue	Position	Event	Notes
Representing China
2006	World Race Walking Cup	A Coruña, Spain	20th	50 km	3:57:54
2008	Olympic Games	Beijing, China	17th	50 km	3:52:58
2010	World Race Walking Cup	Chihuahua, Mexico	4th	50 km	3:55:06
2010	Asian Games	Guangzhou, China	1st	50 km	3:47:04
2011	World Championships	Daegu, South Korea	3rd	50 km	3:44:40
2012	World Race Walking Cup	Saransk, Russia	2nd	50 km	3:43:05
2012	Olympic Games	London, United Kingdom	2nd	50 km	3:37:16

== See also ==
- China at the 2012 Summer Olympics - Athletics
  - Athletics at the 2012 Summer Olympics – Men's 50 kilometres walk
