= Wang Zhendong =

Chinese racewalker

Wang Zhendong (simplified Chinese: 王振东; traditional Chinese: 王振東; born January 11, 1991, in Xinyi, Jiangsu) is a Chinese racewalking athlete, He took the first place of 50 km walk title with a personal best of 3:41:02 at the Chinese National Race Walking Grand Prix in Huangshan March 6, 2016. Wang was eligible for Rio 2016 Olympic 50 km race walking entries.

== Career ==
Born in Xiaowangzhuang, Shiji town, Xinyi, Jiangsu, Wang was a walking enthusiast in his childhood. He represented his school and won the Xinyi race walking title in April 2005. After that he went to Xinxi Sports school, then Wang started his professional walking race training in Xuzhou Sports school in 2007 and became a member of Jiangsu Athletics Team in the same year. He received his first international call-up to the National Athletics Team in 2011.

== International competitions ==
Year	Competition	Venue	Position	Event	Notes
2010	Asian Junior Athletics Championships	Hanoi, Vietnam	1st	10,000 m walk	44:35.95
2012	IAAF Race Walking Challenge Final/ Chinese National Walking Championships	Ordos, Inner Mongolia	2nd	50 km walk	3:57:47
2014	Asian Games	Incheon, South Korea	3rd	50 km walk	3:50:52
