= Subotivka =

Village located in Vinnytsia Oblast, Ukraine

Subotivka Суботівка
- Village
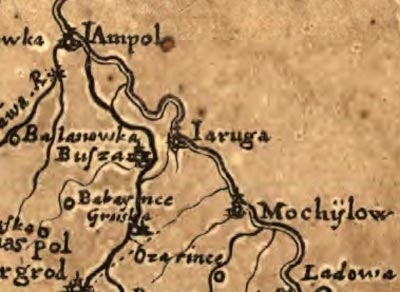
- Beauplan's 1648 map showing the Subotivka/Dniester area.

- Location within Vinnytsia Oblast Location within Ukraine
- Coordinates: 48°19′44″N 27°59′34″E
- Country: Ukraine
- Oblast: Vinnytsia Oblast
- Raion: Mohyliv-Podilskyi Raion
- Hromada: Mohyliv-Podilskyi urban hromada

Subotivka (Ukrainian: Суботівка) is a village in Mohyliv-Podilskyi Raion, Vinnytsia Oblast, southern Ukraine located near the Dniester river border with Moldova.
