= Kōichirō Morioka =

Japanese race walker

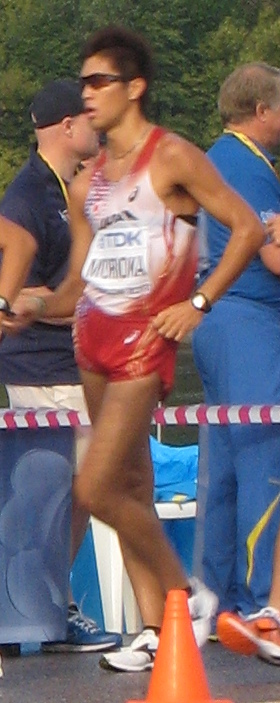
- Kōichirō Morioka in 2013

Personal information
- Born: 2 April 1985 (age 41) Nagasaki, Japan
- Height: 1.84 m (6 ft 1/2 in)
- Weight: 66 kg (146 lb)

Sport
- Country: Japan
- Sport: Athletics
- Event: 50 km walk

Kōichirō Morioka (森岡 紘一朗, Morioka Kōichirō; born 2 April 1985) is a Japanese race walker. He has enjoyed success at University and regional levels, having won two bronze medals at both the Summer Universiade (2005, 2007) and the Asian Games (2006, 2010). Morioka has competed at the four World Championships in Athletics (2005 to 2011) and has represented Japan at three Summer Olympics (2008, 2012, 2016). He also won a silver medal at the 2009 East Asian Games.

He walked an Asian record of 39:07.84 minutes for the 10,000 km track walk in 2010, which was broken two years later by Wang Zhen. He also set a new personal best at the 2012 Summer Olympics.

== Competition record ==
Year	Competition	Venue	Position	Event	Notes
Representing Japan
2004	Asian Junior Championships	Ipoh, Malaysia	5th	10,000 m	43:33.73
2004	World Junior Championships	Grosseto, Italy	6th	10,000 m	41:14.61
2005	World Championships	Helsinki, Finland	29th	20 km	1:27:08
2005	Universiade	İzmir, Turkey	3rd	20 km	1:25:18
2006	World Race Walking Cup	A Coruña, Spain	31st	20 km	1:24:44
2006	Asian Games	Doha, Qatar	3rd	20 km	1:23.17
2007	World Championships	Osaka, Japan	11th	20 km	1:24:46
2007	Universiade	Bangkok, Thailand	3rd	20 km	1:25:10
2008	Olympic Games	Beijing, China	16th	20 km	1:21:57
2009	World Championships	Berlin, Germany	11th	20 km	1:21:48
2009	World Championships	Berlin, Germany	18th	50 km	3:56:21
2009	East Asian Games	Hong Kong	2nd	20 km	1:26:47
2010	World Race Walking Cup	Chihuahua, Mexico	20th	20 km	1:26:36
2010	Asian Games	Guangzhou, China	3rd	50 km	3:47:41
2011	World Championships	Daegu, South Korea	6th	50 km	3:46:21
2012	World Race Walking Cup	Saransk, Russia	38th	20 km	1:24:44
2012	Olympic Games	London, United Kingdom	9th	50 km	3:43:14
