= Park Chil-sung =

South Korean race walker

Personal information
- Born: 8 July 1982 (age 44) Yeongam, South Korea
- Height: 1.73 m (5 ft 8 in)
- Weight: 62 kg (137 lb)

Korean name
- Hangul: 박칠성
- RR: Bak Chilseong
- MR: Pak Ch'ilsŏng
- IPA: [pak̚.tɕʰil.s͈ʌŋ]

Sport
- Country: South Korea
- Sport: Athletics
- Event: 50km Race Walk
Medal record
Men's athletics
Representing South Korea
Asian Championships
Bronze medal – third place	2009 Guangzhou	20 km walk

Park Chil-sung (Korean: 박칠성; born 8 July 1982) is a South Korean race walker.

== Competition record ==
Year	Competition	Venue	Position	Event	Notes
Representing South Korea
2003	Universiade	Daegu, South Korea	5th	20 km	1:24:45
2004	Olympic Games	Athens, Greece	41st	20 km	1:32:41
2005	Universiade	İzmir, Turkey	6th	20 km	1:27:24
2007	World Championships	Osaka, Japan	15th	20 km	1:26:08
2007	Universiade	Bangkok, Thailand	2nd	20 km	1:24:42
2008	Olympic Games	Beijing, China	33rd	20 km	1:25:07
2009	Universiade	Belgrade, Serbia	10th	20 km	1:24:16
2009	World Championships	Berlin, Germany	25th	20 km	1:24:01
2009	Asian Championships	Guangzhou, China	3rd	20 km	1:24:51
2010	Asian Games	Guangzhou, China]	–	20 km	DQ
2011	World Championships	Daegu, South Korea	–	20 km	DNF
2011	World Championships	Daegu, South Korea	6th	50 km	3:47:13
2012	Olympic Games	London, United Kingdom	–	20 km	DNF
2012	Olympic Games	London, United Kingdom	13th	50 km	3:45:55 (NR)
2014	Asian Games	Incheon, South Korea	2nd	50 km	3:49:15
2015	World Championships	Beijing, China	23rd	50 km	3:56:42
2016	Olympic Games	Rio de Janeiro, Brazil	–	50 km	DQ
2017	World Championships	London, United Kingdom	29th	50 km	3:59:46
2018	Asian Games	Jakarta, Indonesia	–	50 km	DQ
