= Joo Hyun-myeong =

South Korean racewalker (born 1997)

Personal information
- Born: 31 May 1997 (age 29)

Sport
- Country: South Korea
- Sport: Racewalking
Medal record
Men's racewalking
Representing South Korea
Asian Games
Bronze medal – third place	2018 Jakarta	50 km walk
Summer Universiade
Silver medal – second place	2019 Naples	20 km walk (team)

Joo Hyun-myeong (born 31 May 1997) is a South Korean racewalker. He won the bronze medal in the men's 50 kilometres walk at the 2018 Asian Games held in Jakarta, Indonesia.

== Career ==
In 2016, he competed in the men's 10,000 metres walk at the 2016 IAAF World U20 Championships held in Bydgoszcz, Poland. He finished in 22nd place. In 2017, he competed in the men's 20 kilometres walk at the 2017 Summer Universiade held in Taipei, Taiwan. He finished in 11th place.

In 2019, he competed in the men's 20 kilometres walk at the 2019 Summer Universiade held in Naples, Italy and he won the silver medal in the team event.
