= José Leyver Ojeda =

Mexican race walker

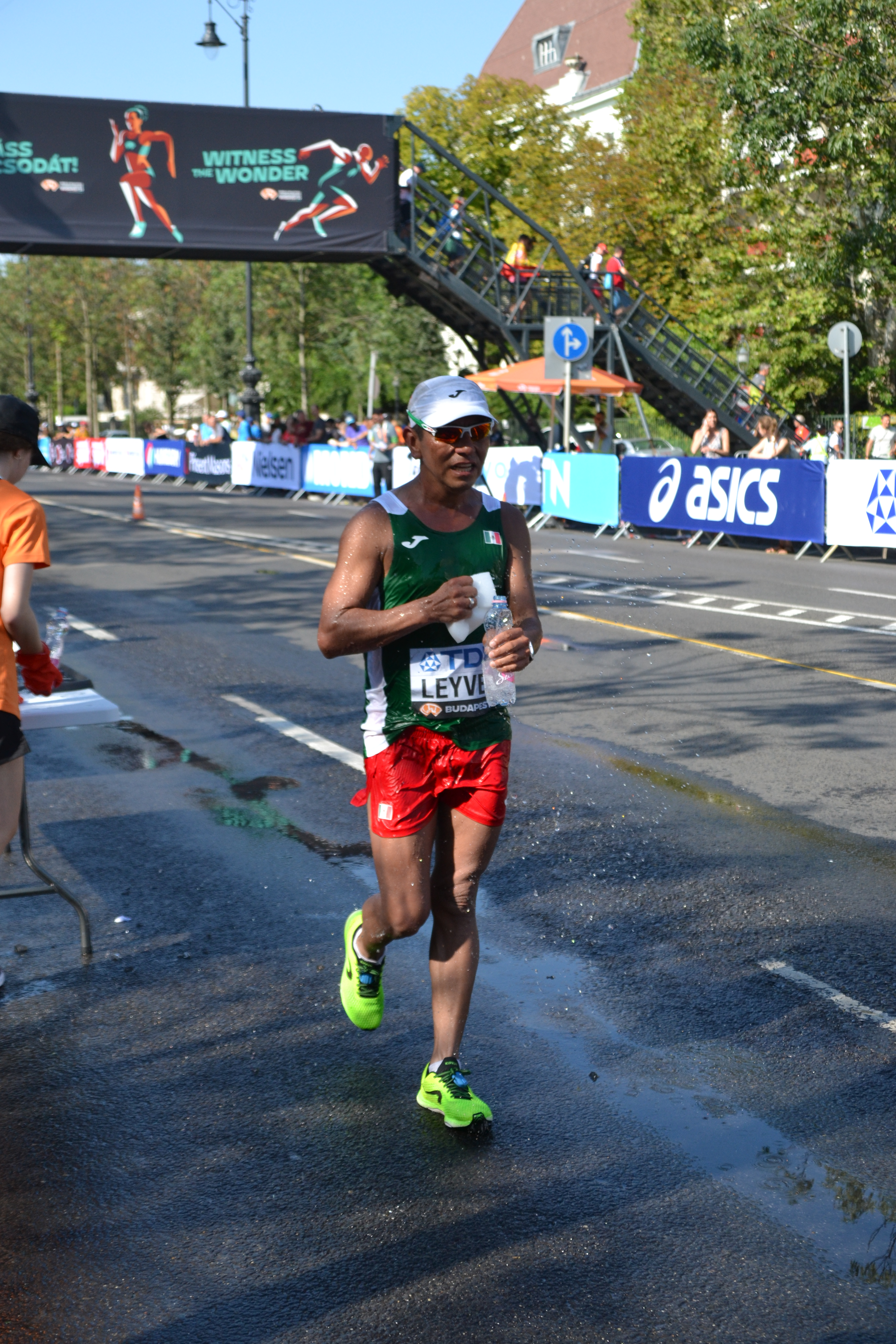

Personal information
- Full name: José Leyver Ojeda Blas
- Born: 12 November 1985 (age 40) Mundo Nuevo, Coatzacoalcos, Veracruz, Mexico
- Height: 1.64 m (5 ft 5 in)
- Weight: 52 kg (115 lb)

Sport
- Country: Mexico
- Sport: Athletics
- Event: Race walking
Medal record
Men's Race walking
Representing Mexico
Pan American Games
Silver medal – second place	2011 Guadalajara	50 km
- Updated on 15 May 2014

José Leyver Ojeda Blas (born 12 November 1985) is a Mexican race walker. He competed in the 50 kilometres walk event at the 2012 Summer Olympics.

In 2021, he represented Mexico at the 2020 Summer Olympics, where he placed 15th in the men's 50 kilometres walk with a season best.

== Personal bests ==
=== Track walk ===
- 20,000 m: 1:30:15.60 hrs – Monterrey, Mexico, 22 June 2008

=== Road walk ===
- 20 km: 1:22:30 hrs – Rio Maior, Portugal, 9 April 2011
- 50 km: 3:49:16 hrs – Guadalajara, Mexico, 29 October 2011

== Achievements ==
Year	Competition	Venue	Position	Event	Notes
Representing the Mexico
2010	World Race Walking Cup	Chihuahua, Mexico	19th	50 km	4:05:23
2010	World Race Walking Cup	Chihuahua, Mexico	2nd	Team (50 km)	22 pts
2011	World Race Walking Challenge	Chihuahua, Mexico	1st	50 km	3:52:33
2011	World Championships	Daegu, South Korea	19th	50 km	3:55:37
2011	Pan American Games	Guadalajara, Mexico	2nd	50 km	3:49:16
2012	World Race Walking Challenge	Chihuahua, Mexico	3rd	50 km	3:51:30
2012	World Race Walking Cup	Saransk, Russia	16th	50 km	3:53:38
2012	World Race Walking Cup	Saransk, Russia	4th	Team (50 km)	49 pts
2012	Olympic Games	London, United Kingdom	27th	50 km	3:55:00
2014	World Race Walking Challenge	Chihuahua, Mexico	1st	50 km	3:50:42
2014	World Race Walking Cup	Taicang, China	19th	50 km	3:52:20
2015	Pan American Race Walking Cup	Arica, Chile	4th	50 km	3:55:04
2015	Pan American Race Walking Cup	Arica, Chile	1st	Team (50 km)	7 pts
2021	Olympic Games	Sapporo, Japan	15th	50 km	3:56:53
