= Basanta Bahadur Rana =

Indian racewalker

Subedar Basanta Bahadur Rana
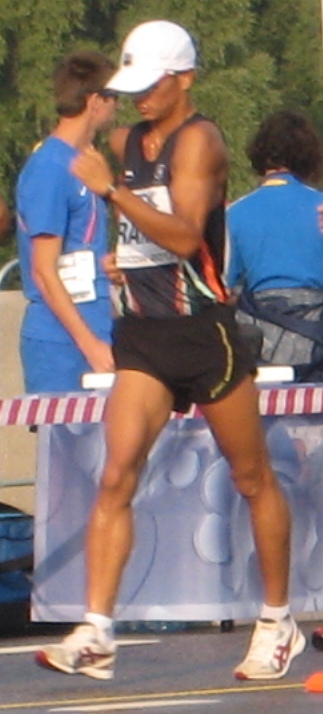
- Basanta Bahadur Rana in 2013

Personal information
- Nationality: Indian
- Born: 18 January 1984 (age 42) Chamkipur, Nawalparasi, Nepal
- Military career
- Allegiance: India
- Branch: Indian Army
- Rank: Subedar
- Unit: Gorkha Rifles

Sport
- Country: India
- Sport: Track and field
- Event: 50 km walk
- Club: Services Sport Control Board, Delhi

Achievements and titles
- Personal bests: 3:56:48 (London 2012) NR
- Updated on 11 August 2012

Sepoy Basanta Bahadur Rana (born 18 January 1984 in Chamkipur, Nawalparasi District, Nepal) is an Indian athlete who competes in racewalking. He represented India in the 50 km race walk event at the 2012 Summer Olympics in London. His personal best in this event before the Games was 4:02:13 and he bettered it by clocking a time of 3:56:48, a new national record.

== 2012 Summer Olympics ==
Basanta qualified for the Olympics at the 2012 IAAF World Race Walking Cup in Saransk, Russia in May 2012, with a B qualifying standard. He was trained by the former national record holder Gurdev Singh. In the 1960 Olympics at Rome, Zora Singh was 8th clocking 4:37:44.6s.

Basanta finished 36th in the event by setting a new national record of 3:56:48. By setting this record, Basanta broke the previous national record of 4:16:22 clocked by his mentor Gurdev Singh who had set it in Hyderabad in 2005.

== Personal life ==
Basanta is from a hamlet, located 12 hours north of Kathmandu, Nepal. He joined the Indian army in 2002 and is currently serving at the Gorkha Regiment. Basanta is supported by Anglian Medal Hunt Company.
