= Vitaliy Anichkin =

Kazakhstani race walker

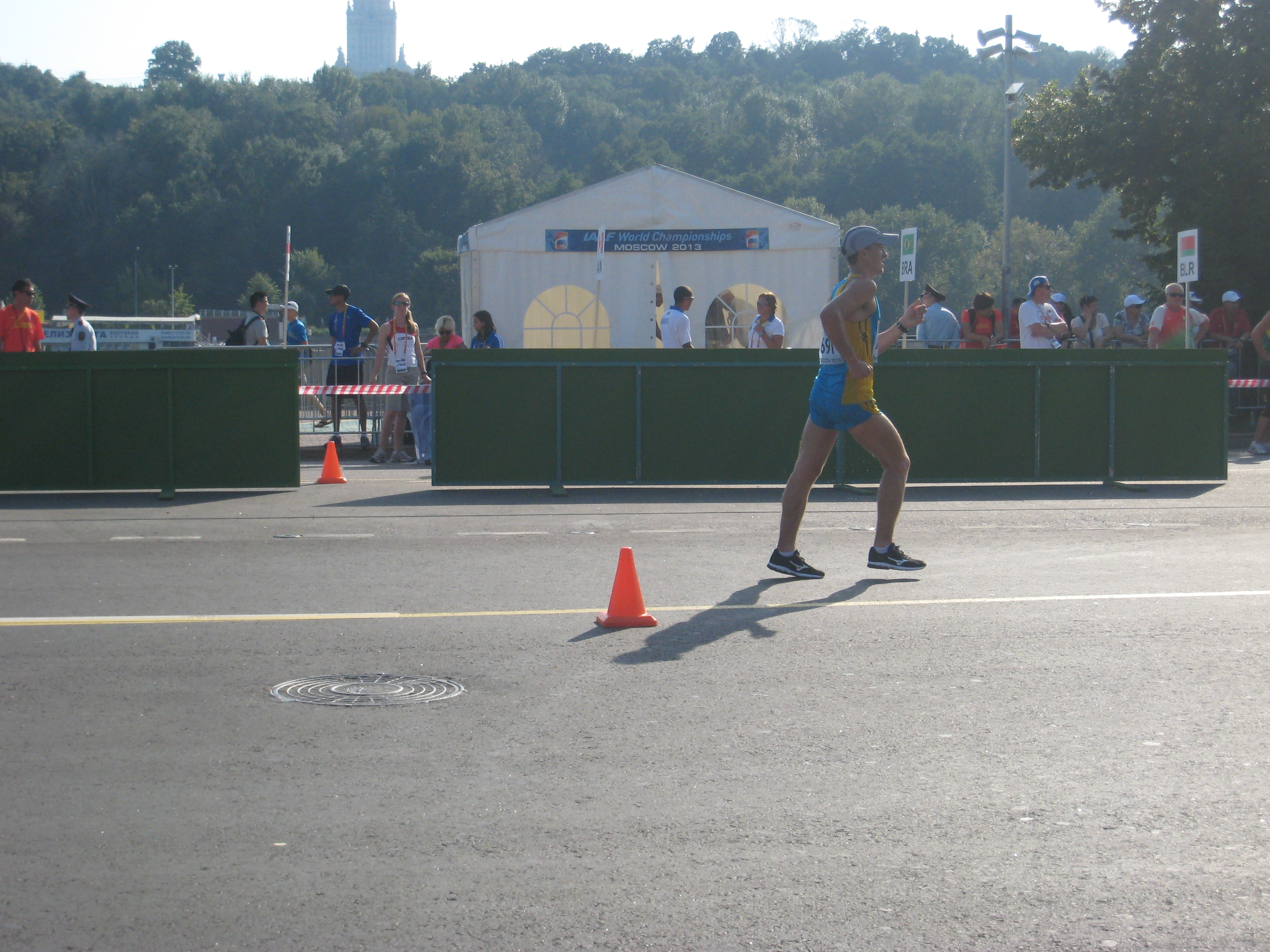
Anichkin during the 20 km race walk at the 2013 World Championships.

Vitaliy Anichkin (born 11 November 1988 in Oral) is a Kazakhstani race walker. He competed in the 50 kilometres walk event at the 2012 Summer Olympics. He competed in the 20 km walk at the 2013 World Championships.
