= Yin Jiaxing =

Chinese racewalker (born 1994)

Personal information
- Born: 16 March 1994 (age 31)

Sport
- Country: China
- Sport: Racewalking

Yin Jiaxing (born 16 March 1994) is a Chinese racewalker. In 2019, he competed in the men's 20 kilometres walk at the 2019 World Athletics Championships held in Doha, Qatar. He finished in 9th place.

In 2019, he competed in the men's 20 kilometres walk at the 2019 Summer Universiade held in Naples, Italy.
