= Serhiy Budza =

Ukrainian race walker

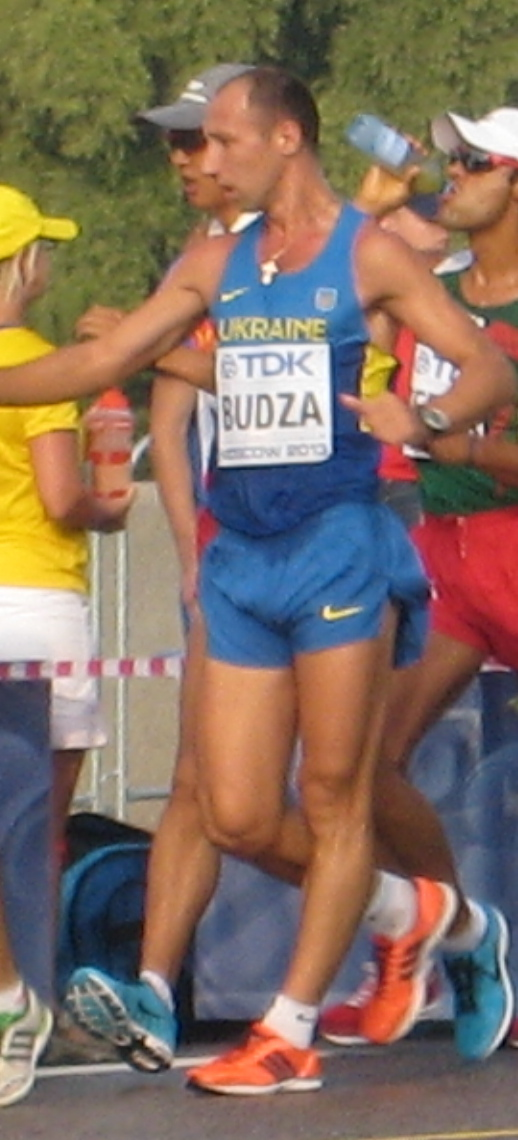
- Serhiy Budza in 2013

Personal information
- Nationality: Ukrainian
- Born: December 6, 1984 Subotivka, Ukraine

Sport
- Sport: Athletics
- Event: Race walking

Achievements and titles
- Olympic finals: 2012 Summer Olympics (50 kilometres walk)

Serhiy Volodymyrovych Budza (born 6 December 1984, in Subotivka) is a Ukrainian race walker. He competed in the 50 kilometres walk event at the 2012 Summer Olympics.
