= Li Jianbo (race walker) =

Chinese racewalker

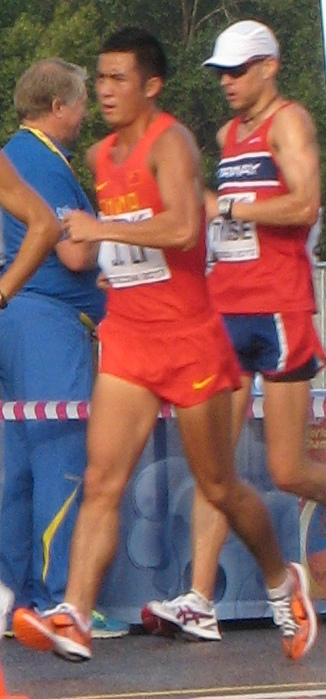
- Li Jianbo in 2013

Personal information
- Born: November 14, 1986 (age 39)
- Height: 1.74 m (5 ft 8 1/2 in)
- Weight: 60 kg (130 lb)

Sport
- Country: China
- Sport: Athletics
- Event: 50km Race Walk
Medal record
Men's athletics
Representing China
Asian Championships
Gold medal – first place	2009 Guangzhou	20 km walk

Li Jianbo (Chinese: 李建波; born November 14, 1986, in Qujing, Yunnan) is a male Chinese race walker. He finished thirteenth in the 50 km race walk event at the 2008 Summer Olympics and sixth at the 2012 Summer Olympics.

== Achievements ==
Year	Competition	Venue	Position	Event	Notes
2008	Olympic Games	Beijing, China	14th	50 km	3:52:20
2009	Asian Championships	Guangzhou, China	1st	20 km	1:22:55
2009	World Championships	Berlin, Germany	11th	20 km	1:21:54
2011	World Championships	Daegu, South Korea	25th	50 km	4:10:26
2012	Olympic Games	London, Great Britain	6th	50 km	3:39:01

== See also ==
- China at the 2012 Summer Olympics - Athletics
  - Athletics at the 2012 Summer Olympics – Men's 50 kilometres walk
