= Bertrand Moulinet =

French racewalker

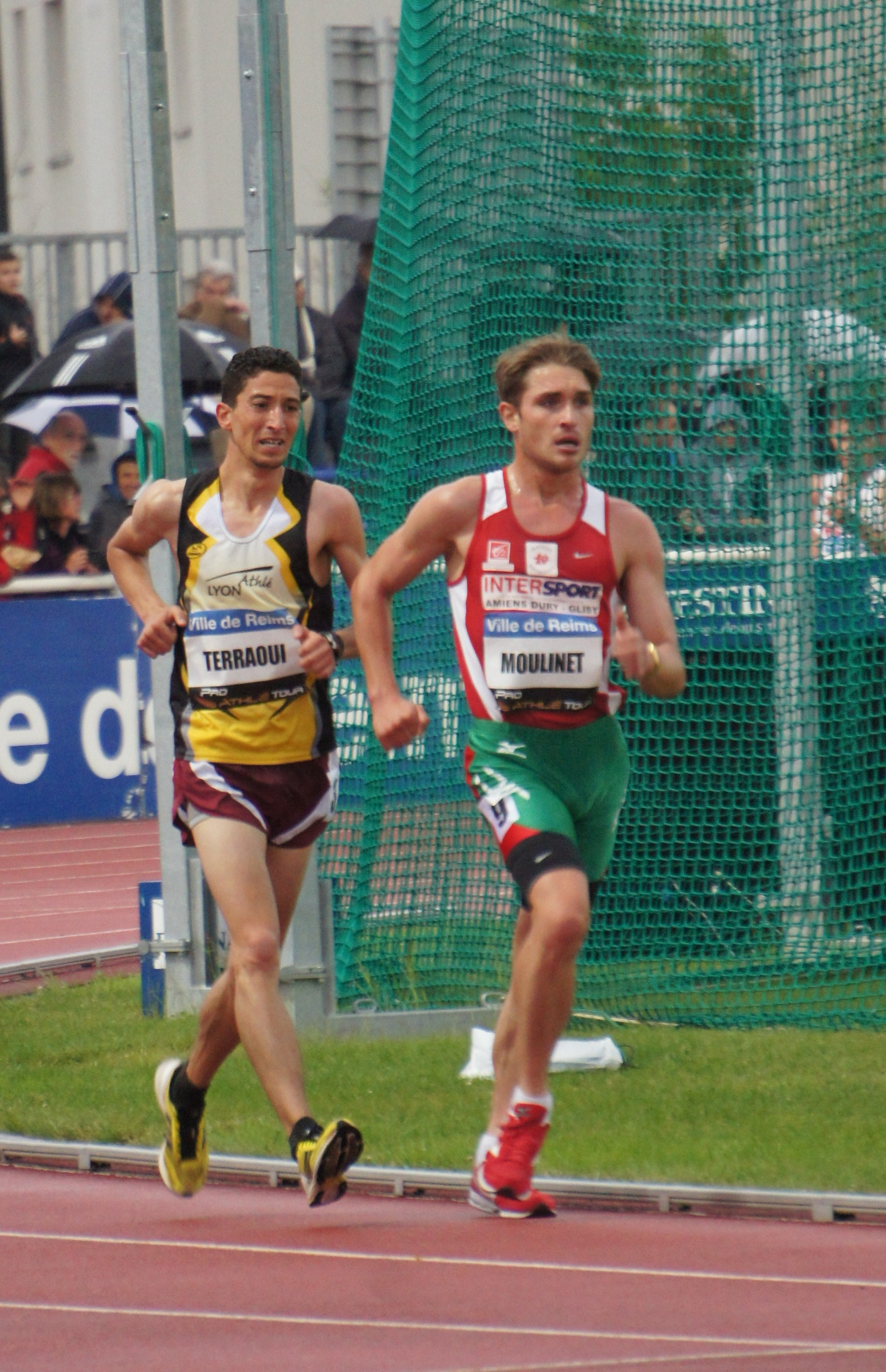
- First, Reims 2013

Personal information
- Born: 6 January 1987 (age 39) Toulouse, France
- Height: 177 cm (5 ft 10 in)
- Weight: 70 kg (154 lb)

Sport
- Country: France
- Sport: Athletics
- Event: Race walking
- Club: Amiens UC

Bertrand Moulinet (born 6 January 1987 in Toulouse) is a French racewalker. He competed in the 20 km walk at the 2012 Summer Olympics, where he placed eighth, and in the 50 km walk where he placed 11th.

== Doping ==
On 30 March 2015 Moulinet tested positive for the HIF inhibitor FG-4592. He admitted doping after the French police had searched his flat and interrogated him. He subsequently received a four-year ban from sport.
