= Cédric Houssaye =

French race walker

Cédric Houssaye (born 13 December 1979 in Trouville-sur-Mer) is a French race walker. He competed in the 50 kilometres walk event at the 2012 Summer Olympics.
