= Yim Jung-hyun =

South Korean race walker

Yim Junghyun (Korean: 임정현; Hanja: 任正賢; born 8 September 1987, Jeollanam-do) is a South Korean race walker. He competed in the 50 kilometres walk event at the 2012 Summer Olympics. He competed in the same event in the 2011 and 2013 Athletics World Championships.
