= Antti Kempas =

Finnish race walker

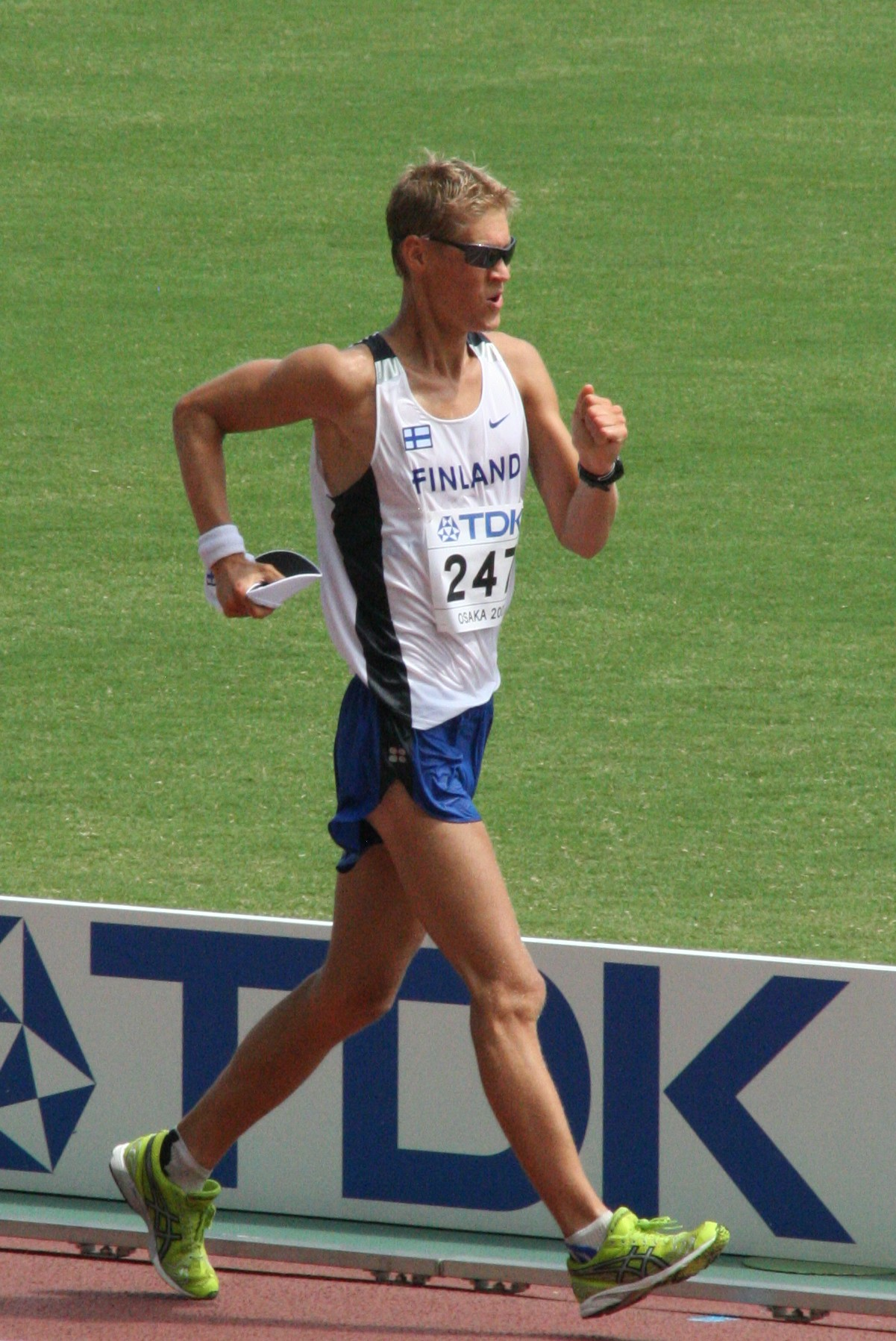
- Kempas at the 2007 World Championships in Athletics.

Personal information
- Born: 3 October 1980 (age 45)
- Height: 1.91 m (6 ft 3 in)
- Weight: 67 kg (148 lb)

Sport
- Country: Finland
- Sport: Athletics
- Event: 50km Race Walk

Antti Kempas (born 3 October 1980 in Helsinki) is a Finnish race walker.

He finished eleventh at the 2007 World Championships in Osaka. He also competed at the 2006 European Championships (where he did not finish) and the 2005 World Championships.

Kempas competed in the 2008 Summer Olympics, where he placed 20th in a time of 3:55:19 hours and also competed at the 2012 Summer Olympics placing 41st with a time of 4:01:50 hours.
