= Nenad Filipović (race walker) =

Serbian race walker

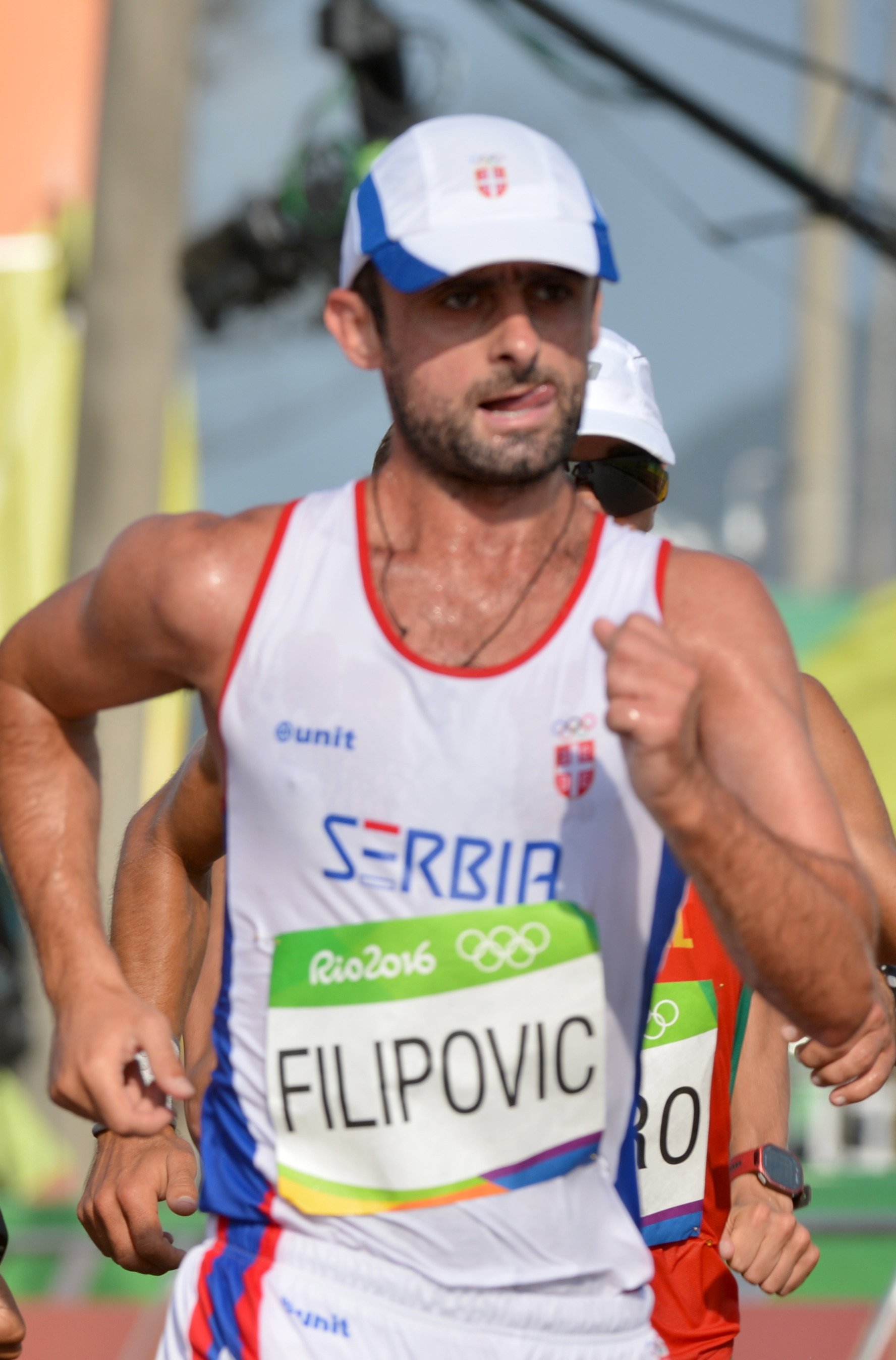
- Filipović at the 2016 Olympics

Personal information
- Born: 5 October 1978 (age 47) Leskovac, SFR Yugoslavia
- Height: 1.82 m (6 ft 0 in)
- Weight: 72 kg (159 lb)

Sport
- Country: Serbia
- Sport: Athletics
- Event: Race walking
- Club: AK Železničar

Achievements and titles
- Personal best(s): 10 km – 41:19.6 (2003); 20 km – 1:23:42 (2006); 50 km – 3:59:17 (2011)

Nenad Filipović (Serbian Cyrillic: Ненад Филиповић; born 5 October 1978) is a Serbian race walker. He competed in the 50 km event at the 2008, 2012 and 2016 Olympics with the best result of 30th place in 2008. His twin brother Predrag is also an Olympic racewalker.
