= South Korea at the World Athletics Championships =

- Flag of South Korea
- WA code: KOR
- Medals: Gold 0 Silver 2 Bronze 1 Total 3

World Athletics Championships appearances (overview)
- 1983; 1987; 1991; 1993; 1995; 1997; 1999; 2001; 2003; 2005; 2007; 2009; 2011; 2013; 2015; 2017; 2019; 2022; 2023; 2025

South Korea has taken part in every edition of the World Athletics Championships, having host the 2011 edition in Daegu. Kim Hyun-Sup was their first medalist, finishing third in the men's 20 kilometres race walk at the 2011 Daegu edition. More recently, high jumper Woo Sang-Hyeok has been on the podium two times, with two second place finishes at the 2022 and 2025 editions.

== Medalists ==
| Medal | Name | Year | Event |
|---|---|---|---|
| Bronze | Kim Hyun-Sup | 2011 Daegu | Men's 20 km W |
| Silver | Woo Sang-Hyeok | 2022 Eugene | Men's high jump |
| Silver | Woo Sang-Hyeok | 2025 Tokyo | Men's high jump |

=== By event ===
| Event | Gold | Silver | Bronze | Total |
|---|---|---|---|---|
| High jump | 0 | 2 | 0 | 2 |
| 20 km W | 0 | 0 | 1 | 1 |
| Totals (2 entries) | 0 | 2 | 1 | 3 |

=== By gender ===
| Gender | Gold | Silver | Bronze | Total |
|---|---|---|---|---|
| Men | 0 | 2 | 1 | 3 |
| Women | 0 | 0 | 0 | 0 |

== See also ==
- South Korea at the Olympics
- South Korea at the Paralympics
