= Japan at the 2017 World Championships in Athletics =

- WA code: JPN
- National federation: Japan Association of Athletics Federations
- Website: www.jaaf.or.jp

in London
- Competitors: 47 in 22 events
- Medals Ranked 28th: Gold 0 Silver 1 Bronze 2 Total 3

World Championships in Athletics appearances
- 1983; 1987; 1991; 1993; 1995; 1997; 1999; 2001; 2003; 2005; 2007; 2009; 2011; 2013; 2015; 2017; 2019; 2022; 2023; 2025

Japan competed at the 2017 World Championships in Athletics in London, United Kingdom, from 4–13 August 2017.

== Medalists ==
The following competitors from Japan won medals at the Championships.

| Medal | Athlete | Event | Date |
|---|---|---|---|
| Silver | Hirooki Arai | Men's 50 km walk | 13 August |
| Bronze | Shuhei Tada; Shota Iizuka; Yoshihide Kiryu; Kenji Fujimitsu; Asuka Cambridge* | Men's 4 × 100 m relay | 12 August |
| Bronze | Kai Kobayashi | Men's 50 km walk | 13 August |

* – Indicates the athlete competed in preliminaries but not the final

== Results ==
(q – qualified, NM – no mark, SB – season best)

=== Men ===
Track and road events

| Athlete | Event | Heat | | Semifinal | | Final | |
| Athlete | Event | Result | Rank | Result | Rank | Result | Rank |
|---|---|---|---|---|---|---|---|
| Asuka Cambridge | 100 metres | 10.21 | 20 q | 10.25 | 16 | Did not advance | |
| Abdul Hakim Sani Brown | 100 metres | 10.05 PB | 6 Q | 10.28 | 19 | Did not advance | |
| Shuhei Tada | 100 metres | 10.19 | 15 q | 10.26 | 17 | Did not advance | |
| Shota Iizuka | 200 metres | 20.58 | 23 Q | 20.62 | 16 | Did not advance | |
| Abdul Hakim Sani Brown | 200 metres | 20.52 | 18 Q | 20.43 | 10 Q | 20.63 | 7 |
| Takamasa Kitagawa | 400 metres | 47.35 | 45 | Did not advance | | | |
| Hiroto Inoue | Marathon | —N/a | | | | 2:16.54 | 26 |
| Yuki Kawauchi | Marathon | —N/a | | | | 2:12.19 | 9 |
| Kentaro Nakamoto | Marathon | —N/a | | | | 2:12.41 | 10 |
| Genta Masuno | 110 metres hurdles | 13.58 | 25 Q | 13.79 | 20 | Did not advance | |
| Hideki Omuro | 110 metres hurdles | 13.78 | 34 | Did not advance | | | |
| Shunya Takayama | 110 metres hurdles | 13.65 | 32 | Did not advance | | | |
| Takatoshi Abe | 400 metres hurdles | 49.65 | 14 Q | 49.93 | 14 | Did not advance | |
| Yusuke Ishida | 400 metres hurdles | 50.35 | 28 | Did not advance | | | |
| Ryo Kajiki | 400 metres hurdles | 51.36 | 31 | Did not advance | | | |
| Hironori Tsuetaki | 3000 metres steeplechase | 8:45.81 | 38 | —N/a | | Did not advance | |
| Shuhei Tada; Shota Iizuka; Yoshihide Kiryu; Kenji Fujimitsu; Asuka Cambridge* | 4 × 100 metres relay | 38.21 SB | 6 Q | —N/a | | 38.04 SB | 3rd place, bronze medalist(s) |
| Kentaro Sato; Yuzo Kanemaru; Kazushi Kimura; Kosuke Horii | 4 × 400 metres relay | 3:07.29 | 15 | —N/a | | Did not advance | |
| Isamu Fujisawa | 20 kilometres walk | —N/a | | | | 1:20:04 | 11 |
| Daisuke Matsunaga | 20 kilometres walk | —N/a | | | | 1:23:39 | 38 |
| Eiki Takahashi | 20 kilometres walk | —N/a | | | | 1:20:36 | 14 |
| Hirooki Arai | 50 kilometres walk | —N/a | | | | 3:41:17 SB | 2nd place, silver medalist(s) |
| Kai Kobayashi | 50 kilometres walk | —N/a | | | | 3:41:19 PB | 3rd place, bronze medalist(s) |
| Satoshi Maruo | 50 kilometres walk | —N/a | | | | 3:43:03 PB | 5 |

* – Indicates the athlete competed in preliminaries but not the final

Field events

| Athlete | Event | Qualification | | Final | |
| Athlete | Event | Distance | Position | Distance | Position |
|---|---|---|---|---|---|
| Takashi Eto | High jump | 2.22 | =21 | Did not advance | |
| Hiroki Ogita | Pole vault | 5.45 | =18 | Did not advance | |
| Seito Yamamoto | Pole vault | 5.30 | 26 | Did not advance | |
| Ryoma Yamamoto | Triple jump | 16.01 | 29 | Did not advance | |
| Ryohei Arai | Javelin throw | 77.38 | 23 | Did not advance | |

Combined events – Decathlon

| Athlete | Event | 100 m | LJ | SP | HJ | 400 m | 110H | DT | PV | JT | 1500 m | Final | Rank |
|---|---|---|---|---|---|---|---|---|---|---|---|---|---|
| Akihiko Nakamura | Result | 11.06 | 7.28 | 11.37 | 1.96 SB | 48.98 | 14.43 | 33.65 | 4.70 | 54.22 SB | 4:22.62 | 7646 | 19 |
| Akihiko Nakamura | Points | 847 | 881 | 568 | 767 | 862 | 920 | 537 | 819 | 651 | 794 | 7646 | 19 |
| Keisuke Ushiro | Result | 11.53 | 6.64 | 13.43 | 1.96 SB | 51.43 SB | 15.35 | 47.64 SB | 4.60 | 63.28 | 4:51.90 | 7498 | 20 |
| Keisuke Ushiro | Points | 746 | 729 | 693 | 767 | 750 | 808 | 821 | 790 | 787 | 607 | 7498 | 20 |

=== Women ===
Track and road events

| Athlete | Event | Heat | | Semifinal | | Final | |
| Athlete | Event | Result | Rank | Result | Rank | Result | Rank |
|---|---|---|---|---|---|---|---|
| Rina Nabeshima | 5000 metres | 15:11.83 PB | 18 | —N/a | | Did not advance | |
| Ayuko Suzuki | 5000 metres | 15:24.86 | 26 | —N/a | | Did not advance | |
| Mizuki Matsuda | 10,000 metres | —N/a | | | | 31:59.54 | 19 |
| Ayuko Suzuki | 10,000 metres | —N/a | | | | 31:27.30 SB | 10 |
| Miyuki Uehara | 10,000 metres | —N/a | | | | 32:31.58 | 24 |
| Yuka Ando | Marathon | —N/a | | | | 2:31:31 | 17 |
| Mao Kiyota | Marathon | —N/a | | | | 2:30:36 | 16 |
| Risa Shigetomo | Marathon | —N/a | | | | 2:36:03 | 27 |
| Ayako Kimura | 100 metres hurdles | 13.15 | 27 Q | 13.29 | 23 | Did not advance | |
| Hitomi Shimura | 100 metres hurdles | 13.29 | 31 | Did not advance | | | |
| Kumiko Okada | 20 kilometres walk | —N/a | | | | 1:31:19 | 18 |

Field events

| Athlete | Event | Qualification | | Final | |
| Athlete | Event | Distance | Position | Distance | Position |
|---|---|---|---|---|---|
| Yuki Ebihara | Javelin throw | 57.51 | 24 | Did not advance | |
| Risa Miyashita | Javelin throw | 53.83 | 29 | Did not advance | |
| Marina Saito | Javelin throw | 60.86 | 16 | Did not advance | |
