= South Korea at the 2025 World Athletics Championships =

- Flag of South Korea
- WA code: KOR

in Tokyo, Japan 13 September 2025 – 21 September 2025
- Competitors: 8 (6 men and 2 women)
- Medals Ranked 27th: Gold 0 Silver 1 Bronze 0 Total 1

World Athletics Championships appearances (overview)
- 1983; 1987; 1991; 1993; 1995; 1997; 1999; 2001; 2003; 2005; 2007; 2009; 2011; 2013; 2015; 2017; 2019; 2022; 2023; 2025

South Korea competed at the 2025 World Athletics Championships in Tokyo, Japan, from 13 to 21 September 2025.

== Medallists ==
Medal	Athlete	Event	Date
Silver	Woo Sang-hyeok	Men's high jump	September 16

== Results ==
South Korea entered 8 athletes to the championships: 2 women and 6 men.

Key

- Q = Qualified for the next round
- q = Qualified for the next round as a fastest loser or, in field events, by position without achieving the qualifying target
- NR = National record
- PB = Personal best
- SB = Season best
- N/A = Round not applicable for the event

=== Men ===
Track and road events

Athlete	Event	Heat		Semifinal		Final	
Athlete	Event	Result	Rank	Result	Rank	Result	Rank
Ko Seung-hwan	200 metres	20.49	6	Did not advance			
Park Min-ho	Marathon	—N/a				DNF	
Choe Byeong-kwang	20 kilometres walk	—N/a				1:22:52	30
Kim Min-gyu	35 kilometres walk	—N/a				DNF	

Field events

Athlete	Event	Qualification		Final	
Athlete	Event	Distance	Position	Distance	Position
Woo Sang-hyeok	High jump	2.25	3 q	2.34 SB	2nd place, silver medalist(s)
Yu Gyu-min	Triple jump	16.19	28	Did not advance	

=== Women ===
Track and road events

Athlete	Event	Heat		Semifinal		Final	
Athlete	Event	Result	Rank	Result	Rank	Result	Rank
Choi Kyung-sun	Marathon	—N/a				2:35:42	29
Lim Ye-jin	Marathon	—N/a				2:38:31	37
