= Qinghong =

Qinghong is a Chinese given name in pinyin (Ch'ing-hung in the Wade–Giles scheme). It may refer to:

- Liu Qinghong (born 1996), Chinese long-distance runner
- Zeng Qinghong (born 1939), Chinese politician
- Zeng Qinghong (born 1962), Chinese politician
- Shanghai Dreams, a 1995 Chinese film whose Chinese title is Qīng Hóng

== See also ==
- Qinghong (wine), a variety of Huangjiu from Fuzhou
- Jinghong (disambiguation)
- Qinggong, a technique in Chinese martial arts
- Qinglong (disambiguation)
