= South Korea at the 2017 World Championships in Athletics =

- WA code: KOR

in London
- Competitors: 17
- Medals: Gold 0 Silver 0 Bronze 0 Total 0

World Championships in Athletics appearances
- 1983; 1987; 1991; 1993; 1995; 1997; 1999; 2001; 2003; 2005; 2007; 2009; 2011; 2013; 2015; 2017; 2019; 2022; 2023; 2025

South Korea competed at the 2017 World Championships in Athletics in London, Great Britain, from 4–13 August 2017.

== Results ==
(q – qualified, NM – no mark, SB – season best)

=== Men ===
Track and road events

Athlete	Event	Heat		Semifinal		Final	
Athlete	Event	Result	Rank	Result	Rank	Result	Rank
Kim Kuk-young	100 metres	10.24	24 Q	10.40	23	Did not advance	
Kim Hyo-su	Marathon	—N/a				2:25:08	59
Shin Kwang-sik	Marathon	—N/a				2:29:52	65
Yu Seung-yeop	Marathon	—N/a				2:29:06	64
Kim Byoung-jun	110 metres hurdles	13.81	36	Did not advance			
Choe Byeong-kwang	20 kilometres walk	—N/a				1:22:54 SB	31
Kim Hyun-sub	20 kilometres walk	—N/a				1:22:08	26
Kim Dae-ho	20 kilometres walk	—N/a				1:30:41	57
Park Chil-sung	50 kilometres walk	—N/a				3:59:46 SB	29

Field events

Athlete	Event	Qualification		Final	
Athlete	Event	Distance	Position	Distance	Position
Woo Sang-hyeok	High jump	2.22	25	Did not advance	
Kim Deok-hyeon	Long jump	7.85	16	Did not advance	

=== Women ===
Track and road events

Athlete	Event	Heat		Semifinal		Final	
Athlete	Event	Result	Rank	Result	Rank	Result	Rank
Choi Kyung-sun	Marathon	—N/a				2:45:46	54
Kim Seon-geun	Marathon	—N/a				2:39:52	38
Lim Kyung-hee	Marathon	—N/a				2:38:38	34
Jung Hye-lim	100 metres hurdles	13.37	34	Did not advance			
Jeon Yeon-geun	20 kilometres walk	—N/a				1:33:29 SB	30
Lee Da-seul	20 kilometres walk	—N/a				1:38:54	48
