= 2017 World Championships in Athletics – Women's marathon =

Long distance running race at the 2017 World Athletics Championships

Women's Marathon at the 2017 World Championships
- Tower Bridge
- Venue: Along the streets of London, starting and finishing on Tower Bridge
- Date: 6 August 2017
- Competitors: 91 from 46 nations
- Winning time: 2:27:11

Medalists
gold medal	Rose Chelimo	Bahrain
silver medal	Edna Kiplagat	Kenya
bronze medal	Amy Cragg	United States

The women's marathon was one of the road events at the 2017 World Championships in Athletics in London. It took place on 6 August 2017 on the streets of London, and consisted of four laps of a roughly 10-kilometre (6.2 mi) course which passed several of London's landmarks. For the first time in World Championships history, the men's and women's marathons took place on the same day. The race was won by Rose Chelimo of Bahrain in 2:27:11, seven seconds ahead of Kenya's Edna Kiplagat in second. Amy Cragg of the United States finished in third, separated from Kiplagat by less than a second.

Catarina Ribeiro of Portugal led for the first 10 kilometres (6.2 mi) before relinquishing the lead to Great Britain's Alyson Dixon, who opened up a 30-second lead halfway through the race. She was gradually caught over the next 8 kilometres (5.0 mi), and a pack of fourteen runners vied for the lead until the 35-kilometre (22 mi) point, when Chelimo increased the pace and four runners broke away at the front. Chelimo and Kiplagat battled for the lead of the race, while Cragg and Kenya's Flomena Cheyech Daniel fought for third place. Ultimately, sprint finishes from Chelimo and Cragg secured them first and third respectively.

== Qualification ==
The International Association of Athletics Federations (IAAF, now known as World Athletics) announced the qualifying criteria for the 2017 World Championships in Athletics in March 2016. For the women's marathon, the entry standard was 2:45:00, one minute slower than for the 2015 World Championships, and the same as for the 2016 Olympics. Entry criteria had to be met during the qualification period: 1 October 2016, and 23 July 2017, inclusive.

== Preview ==
In November 2016, the marathon route was announced; the course consisted of four laps of a roughly 10-kilometre (6.2 mi) route passing by some of London's historic landmarks. The course started and finished on Tower Bridge, travelled along Victoria Embankment along the River Thames until it reached the Houses of Parliament, looped away from the river past St Paul's Cathedral, before heading back to the Tower of London. Niels de Vos, the tournament director, said that the route was designed to be as flat as possible to allow for the possibility of fast times, while also aiming to use well-known landmarks to provide "a stunning backdrop to a huge global TV audience".

For the first time in the World Championships, the men's and women's marathons were scheduled to take place on the same day; the men's race at 10:55 and the women's at 14:00. The weather was forecast to be between 14 and 21 °C (57 and 70 °F), with a 18-kilometre-per-hour (11 mph) southwesterly wind which LetsRun.com suggested could be particularly significant on the exposed parts of the route along the river.

The race featured ten women who had previously completed sub-2:22 marathons, leading LetsRun.com to speculate that "You won’t find a deeper marathon on planet Earth this year than the women's race at the 2017 World Championships." They suggested that Edna Kiplagat of Kenya, Ethiopia's Mare Dibaba and Eunice Kirwa of Bahrain were the favourites for the race. Kiplagat had won the marathon twice before at the World Championships, in 2011 and 2013, and had won the Boston Marathon earlier in the year. Dibaba had raced at the 2017 London Marathon, where she did not finish, but was the reigning World Champion, having won in 2015. Kirwa had finished second to Dibaba in 2015, and had also been runner-up at the 2016 Olympics. Athletics Weekly also predicted that Kiplagat and Mare Dibaba would finish in the top-three, but included another Ethiopian, Berhane Dibaba, alongside them. Mary Keitany, who had broken the women-only marathon world record earlier in the year, did not take part in the World Championships, opting instead to prepare for the 2017 New York City Marathon.

== Summary ==
The race started at 14:00 on 6 August 2017, in temperatures of 19 °C (66 °F) and a humidity level of 56%. In the opening stages of the race, Portugal's Catarina Ribeiro broke away and led the first ten kilometres (6.2 mi) of the race, before she was caught by Alyson Dixon of Great Britain. Ribeiro ultimately dropped out of the race, and did not finish. Dixon ran alone at the head of the field, and by the halfway stage she had established a 30-second gap to the pack behind. During the second half of the race, the main group closed the gap on Dixon, narrowing it to 14 seconds by the 25-kilometre (16 mi) point, and catching her just before the 30-kilometre (19 mi) point. Dixon, who stayed with the leading pack for another 5 kilometres (3.1 mi) before falling back to finish 18th, said after "I never in my wildest dreams expected to be leading. If you can't enjoy running a World Championship in London with that support, what are you in the sport for?"

After the pack caught Dixon, Kiplagat initially took on the lead, before Australia's Jessica Trengove took over around the 35-kilometre (22 mi) mark. By this stage, the leading group contained fourteen runners, but Chelimo soon increased the pace and split the pack up. A group of four runners broke away at the front: Chelimo; Kiplagat; Amy Cragg of the United States; and Kenya's Flomena Cheyech Daniel. Kiplagat made the next push, and led with just over 2 kilometres (1.2 mi) to go; Canadian Running's Sinead Mulhern compared the finish to that of the Boston Marathon earlier in the year, when Kiplagat had beaten Chelimo in a sprint finish. On this occasion, Chelimo counter-attacked and moved back ahead of Kiplagat, who could not respond; and Chelimo held on to claim the gold medal by seven seconds, in 2:27:11. Behind the pair, Cragg managed a sprint finish to beat Daniel to third place, and almost caught Kiplagat; both runners were credited with a finish time of 2:27.18. Dagmara Handzlik of Cyprus, who finished 35th in a time of 2:38:52, established a new national record.

== Results ==
Results
Rank	Name	Nationality	Time	Notes
1st place, gold medalist(s)	Rose Chelimo	Bahrain	2:27:11	SB
2nd place, silver medalist(s)	Edna Kiplagat	Kenya	2:27:18	SB
3rd place, bronze medalist(s)	Amy Cragg	United States	2:27:18	SB
4	Flomena Cheyech Daniel	Kenya	2:27:21	
5	Shure Demise	Ethiopia	2:27:58	
6	Eunice Kirwa	Bahrain	2:28:17	
7	Helah Kiprop	Kenya	2:28:19	
8	Mare Dibaba	Ethiopia	2:28:49	SB
9	Jessica Trengove	Australia	2:28:59	
10	Berhane Dibaba	Ethiopia	2:29:01	
11	Serena Burla	United States	2:29:32	
12	Aselefech Mergia	Ethiopia	2:29:43	
13	Charlotte Purdue	Great Britain & N.I.	2:29:48	
14	Eva Vrabcová-Nývltová	Czech Republic	2:29:56	PB
15	Kim Hye-gyong	North Korea	2:30:29	SB
16	Mao Kiyota	Japan	2:30:36	
17	Yuka Ando	Japan	2:31:31	
18	Alyson Dixon	Great Britain & N.I.	2:31:36	
19	Helalia Johannes	Namibia	2:32:01	
20	Sinead Diver	Australia	2:33:26	
21	Marta Esteban	Spain	2:33:37	SB
22	Fate Tola	Germany	2:33:39	
23	Izabela Trzaskalska	Poland	2:35:03	
24	Milly Clark	Australia	2:35:27	SB
25	Anne-Mari Hyryläinen	Finland	2:35:33	
26	Inés Melchor	Peru	2:35:34	
27	Risa Shigetomo	Japan	2:36:03	
28	Filomena Costa	Portugal	2:36:42	SB
29	Jo Un-ok	North Korea	2:36:46	
30	Beata Naigambo	Namibia	2:37:24	SB
31	Ilona Marhele	Latvia	2:37:40	PB
32	Rosa Chacha	Ecuador	2:37:50	
33	Claire McCarthy	Ireland	2:38:26	SB
34	Lim Kyung-hee	South Korea	2:38:38	
35	Dagmara Handzlik	Cyprus	2:38:52	NR
36	Katarzyna Kowalska	Poland	2:39:39	
37	Lindsay Flanagan	United States	2:39:47	SB
38	Kim Seong-eun	South Korea	2:39:52	
39	Katharina Heinig	Germany	2:39:59	SB
40	Mapaseka Makhanya	South Africa	2:40:15	SB
41	Lonah Chemtai Salpeter	Israel	2:40:22	SB
42	Viktoriia Poliudina	Kyrgyzstan	2:40:28	PB
43	Tracy Barlow	Great Britain & N.I.	2:41:03	
44	Darya Mykhaylova	Ukraine	2:41:29	
45	Vaida Žūsinaitė	Lithuania	2:41:44	SB
46	Paula González Berodia	Spain	2:42:47	
47	Rutendo Nyahora	Zimbabwe	2:42:53	SB
48	Tetyana Vernyhor	Ukraine	2:43:12	
49	Wilma Arizapana	Peru	2:43:13	
50	Lavinia Haitope	Namibia	2:44:02	
51	Tarah Korir	Canada	2:44:30	
52	Khishigsaikhan Galbadrakh	Mongolia	2:44:48	
53	Anita Kažemaka	Latvia	2:44:49	SB
54	Choi Kyung-sun	South Korea	2:45:46	
55	Dailín Belmonte	Cuba	2:46:15	SB
56	Sara Ramadhani	Tanzania	2:46:23	
57	Bojana Bjeljac	Croatia	2:46:46	
58	Munkhzaya Bayartsogt	Mongolia	2:46:59	
59	Jenna Challenor	South Africa	2:47:22	SB
60	Lisa Ring	Sweden	2:48:39	
61	Carmen Toaquiza	Ecuador	2:48:45	
62	Rosa Godoy	Argentina	2:49:30	SB
63	Maor Tiyouri	Israel	2:49:45	SB
64	Monika Athare	India	2:49:54	
65	Liu Qinghong	China	2:52:21	SB
66	Iuliia Andreeva	Kyrgyzstan	2:53:17	SB
67	Liliana Maria Dragomir	Romania	2:53:30	
68	Mayada Al-Sayad	Palestine	2:54:58	SB
69	Matea Matošević	Croatia	2:55:06	SB
70	Dayna Pidhoresky	Canada	2:56:15	
71	Gloria Privileggio	Greece	2:57:06	
72	Angela Brito	Ecuador	2:58:21	
73	Yelena Nanaziashvili	Kazakhstan	2:58:32	
74	Fortunale Chidzivo	Zimbabwe	2:58:51	SB
75	Teodora Simović	Serbia	2:59:01	
76	Nikolina Stepan	Croatia	2:59:43	
77	María Grazzia Bianchi	Venezuela	3:04:11	
78	Marisa Casanueva	Spain	3:05:03	
DNF	Cao Mojie	China	DNF	
DNF	Fadime Suna Çelik	Turkey	DNF	
DNF	Kenza Dahmani	Algeria	DNF	
DNF	Hsieh Chien-ho	Chinese Taipei	DNF	
DNF	Viktoria Khapilina	Ukraine	DNF	
DNF	Kim Hye-song	North Korea	DNF	
DNF	Yolimar Pineda	Venezuela	DNF	
DNF	Ourania Rebouli	Greece	DNF	
DNF	Catarina Ribeiro	Portugal	DNF	
DNF	Magdalena Shauri	Tanzania	DNF	
DNF	Paula Todoran	Romania	DNF	
DNF	Hiruni Kesara Wijayaratne	Sri Lanka	DNF	
DNF	Louise Wiker	Sweden	DNF	
DNS	Yelena Dolinin	Israel	DNS	
