= Mongolia at the 2017 World Championships in Athletics =

- WA code: MGL

in London
- Competitors: 5
- Medals: Gold 0 Silver 0 Bronze 0 Total 0

World Championships in Athletics appearances
- 1991; 1993; 1995; 1997; 1999; 2001; 2003; 2005; 2007; 2009; 2011; 2013; 2015; 2017; 2019; 2022; 2023

Mongolia competed at the 2017 World Championships in Athletics in London, United Kingdom, from 4–13 August 2017.

== Results ==
(q – qualified, NM – no mark, SB – season best)

=== Men ===
Track and road events

Athlete	Event	Final	
Athlete	Event	Result	Rank
Ser-Od Bat-Ochir	Marathon	2:21:55	48
Munkhbayar Narandulam	Marathon	2:18:42 PB	34
Tseveenravdan Byambajav	Marathon	2:21:48	46

=== Women ===
Track and road events

Athlete	Event	Final	
Athlete	Event	Result	Rank
Munkhzaya Bayartsogt	Marathon	2:46:59	58
Khishigsaikhan Galbadrakh	Marathon	2:44:48	52
