= Mongolia at the 2019 World Athletics Championships =

Mongolia at the 2019 World Championships in Athletics
- WA code: MGL

in Doha, Qatar
- Competitors: 4 in 2 events
- Medals: Gold 0 Silver 0 Bronze 0 Total 0

World Championships in Athletics appearances
- 1991; 1993; 1995; 1997; 1999; 2001; 2003; 2005; 2007; 2009; 2011; 2013; 2015; 2017; 2019; 2022; 2023

Mongolia competed at the 2019 World Athletics Championships in Doha, Qatar from 27 September to 6 October, 2019.

== Results ==
Key

- Note–Ranks given for track events are within the athlete's heat only
- Q = Qualified for the next round
- q = Qualified for the next round as a fastest loser or, in field events, by position without achieving the qualifying target
- NR = National record
- PB = Personal best
- N/A = Round not applicable for the event
- Bye = Athlete not required to compete in round

=== Men ===
Track and road events

Athlete	Event	Heat		Semifinal		Final	
Athlete	Event	Result	Rank	Result	Rank	Result	Rank
Tseveenravdangiin Byambajav	Marathon	—				2:20:07	40
Bat-Ochiryn Ser-Od	Marathon	—				2:36:01	54

=== Women ===
Track and road events

Athlete	Event	Heat		Semifinal		Final	
Athlete	Event	Result	Rank	Result	Rank	Result	Rank
Galbadrakhyn Khishigsaikhan	Marathon	—				2:56:15	25
Bayartsogtyn Mönkhzayaa	Marathon	—				3:02:57	34
