= South Korea at the 2001 World Championships in Athletics =

- WA code: KOR
- National federation: Korea Association of Athletics Federations
- Website: www.kaaf.or.kr

in Edmonton
- Competitors: 7
- Medals: Gold 0 Silver 0 Bronze 0 Total 0

World Championships in Athletics appearances
- 1983; 1987; 1991; 1993; 1995; 1997; 1999; 2001; 2003; 2005; 2007; 2009; 2011; 2013; 2015; 2017; 2019; 2022; 2023; 2025

South Korea competed at the 2001 World Championships in Athletics from August 3 to 12. A team of 7 athletes was announced in preparation for the competition.

== Results ==
=== Men ===
Athlete	Event	Heats Qualification		Quarterfinals		Semifinals		Final	
Athlete	Event	Time Width Height	Rank	Time Width Height	Rank	Time Width Height	Rank	Time Width Height	Rank
Lim Jin-Soo	Marathon							2:23:16	22
Kim Yi-Yong	Marathon							2:33:28	54
Lee Bong-Ju	Marathon							Din not finish	
Shin Il-Yong	20 kilometres walk							1:27:47	19

=== Women ===
Athlete	Event	Heats Qualification		Quarterfinals		Semifinals		Final	
Athlete	Event	Time Width Height	Rank	Time Width Height	Rank	Time Width Height	Rank	Time Width Height	Rank
Yun Sun-Sook	Marathon							2:33:09	16
Kim Mi-Jung	20 kilometres walk							1:35:30	14
Lee Myung-Sun	Shot put	17.66	14					Did not advance	
