= Mongolia at the 2015 World Championships in Athletics =

- WA code: MGL

in Beijing
- Competitors: 3
- Medals: Gold 0 Silver 0 Bronze 0 Total 0

World Championships in Athletics appearances
- 1991; 1993; 1995; 1997; 1999; 2001; 2003; 2005; 2007; 2009; 2011; 2013; 2015; 2017; 2019; 2022; 2023; 2025

Mongolia competed at the 2015 World Championships in Athletics in Beijing, China, from 22–30 August 2015.

== Results ==
(q – qualified, NM – no mark, SB – season best)

=== Men ===
Track and road events

| Athlete | Event | Heat | | Semifinal | | Final | |
| Athlete | Event | Result | Rank | Result | Rank | Result | Rank |
|---|---|---|---|---|---|---|---|
| Ser-Od Bat-Ochir | Marathon | —N/a | | | | 2:32:09 | 38 |

=== Women ===
Track and road events

| Athlete | Event | Heat | | Semifinal | | Final | |
| Athlete | Event | Result | Rank | Result | Rank | Result | Rank |
|---|---|---|---|---|---|---|---|
| Luvsanlkhündegiin Otgonbayar | Marathon | —N/a | | | | DNF | |
| Munkhzaya Bayartsogt | Marathon | —N/a | | | | 2:45:01 | 35 |
