= Athletics at the 2018 Asian Games – Women's marathon =

Women's marathon at the 2018 Asian Games
- Venue: Gelora Bung Karno Stadium
- Date: 26 August 2018
- Competitors: 19 from 11 nations

Medalists
gold medal	Rose Chelimo	Bahrain
silver medal	Keiko Nogami	Japan
bronze medal	Choi Kyung-sun	South Korea

The women's marathon competition at the 2018 Asian Games took place on 26 August 2018 at the Gelora Bung Karno Stadium.

== Schedule ==
All times are Western Indonesia Time (UTC+07:00)

Date	Time	Event
Sunday, 26 August 2018	06:00	Final

== Records ==
Prior to this competition, the existing world, Asian and Games records were as follows.

World Record	Paula Radcliffe (GBR)	2:15:25	London, United Kingdom	13 April 2003
Asian Record	Mizuki Noguchi (JPN)	2:19:12	Berlin, Germany	25 September 2005
Games Record	Naoko Takahashi (JPN)	2:21:47	Bangkok, Thailand	6 December 1998

== Results ==
Legend

- DNF — Did not finish

Rank	Athlete	Time	Notes
1st place, gold medalist(s)	Rose Chelimo (BRN)	2:34:51	
2nd place, silver medalist(s)	Keiko Nogami (JPN)	2:36:27	
3rd place, bronze medalist(s)	Choi Kyung-sun (KOR)	2:37:49	
4	Jo Un-ok (PRK)	2:38:32	
5	Kim Do-yeon (KOR)	2:39:28	
6	Bayartsogtyn Mönkhzayaa (MGL)	2:40:14	
7	Zhang Meixia (CHN)	2:41:30	
8	Hanae Tanaka (JPN)	2:42:35	
9	Galbadrakhyn Khishigsaikhan (MGL)	2:42:57	
10	Mary Joy Tabal (PHI)	2:51:41	
11	Viktoriia Poliudina (KGZ)	2:54:37	
12	Nicole Chui (HKG)	2:55:23	
13	Gulzhanat Zhanatbek (KAZ)	2:56:49	
14	Jane Vongvorachoti (THA)	3:03:11	
15	Vut Tsz Ying (HKG)	3:03:34	
16	Linda Janthachit (THA)	3:08:14	
—	Mariia Korobitskaia (KGZ)	DNF	
—	Gong Lihua (CHN)	DNF	
DQ	Kim Hye-song (PRK)	~~2:37:20~~	

- Kim Hye-song of North Korea originally won the bronze medal, but was disqualified after the Athletics Integrity Unit annulled her 2018 results.
