= South Korea at the 2007 World Championships in Athletics =

- WA code: KOR
- National federation: Korea Association of Athletics Federations
- Website: www.kaaf.or.kr

in Osaka
- Competitors: 11
- Medals: Gold 0 Silver 0 Bronze 0 Total 0

World Championships in Athletics appearances
- 1983; 1987; 1991; 1993; 1995; 1997; 1999; 2001; 2003; 2005; 2007; 2009; 2011; 2013; 2015; 2017; 2019; 2022; 2023; 2025

South Korea competed at the 2007 World Championships in Athletics from August 25 to September 2. A team of 11 athletes was announced in preparation for the competition.

== Results ==
=== Men ===
| Athlete | Event | Heats Qualification | | Semifinals | | Final | |
| Athlete | Event | Time Width Height | Rank | Time Width Height | Rank | Time Width Height | Rank |
|---|---|---|---|---|---|---|---|
| Park Ju-Young | Marathon | | | | | 2:21:49 | 15 |
| Kim Young-chun | Marathon | | | | | 2:24:25 | 24 |
| Lee Myong-seung | Marathon | | | | | 2:25:54 | 26 |
| Park Chil-sung | 20 kilometres walk | | | | | 1:26:08 | 15 |
| Kim Hyun-sub | 20 kilometres walk | | | | | 1:26:51 | 20 |
| Kim Deok-hyeon | Triple jump | 16.78 | 8 Q | | | 16.71 | 9 |

Decathlon

| Kim Kun-woo | Decathlon | | | |
| Kim Kun-woo | Event | Results | Points | Rank |
|---|---|---|---|---|
| | 100 m | 11.29 | 797 | 25 |
| | Long jump | 7.12 | 842 | 21 |
| | Shot put | 12.83 (SB) | 657 | 26 |
| | High jump | 1.91 (SB) | 723 | 22 |
| | 400 m | 48.99 (SB) | 862 | 13 |
| | 110 m hurdles | 14.89 (PB) | 863 | 19 |
| | Discus throw | 36.23 (SB) | 588 | 25 |
| | Pole vault | 4.80 (PB) | 849 | 13 |
| | Javelin throw | 44.79 | 512 | 23 |
| | 1500 m | 4:16.16 (SB) | 838 | 1 |
| Total | | | 7531 (SB) | 21 |

=== Women ===
| Athlete | Event | Heats Qualification | | Semifinals | | Final | |
| Athlete | Event | Time Width Height | Rank | Time Width Height | Rank | Time Width Height | Rank |
|---|---|---|---|---|---|---|---|
| Lim Kyung-hee | Marathon | | | | | 2:49:30 (SB) | 49 |
| Chae Eun-hee | Marathon | | | | | 2:50:26 | 50 |
| Kim Mi-jung | 20 kilometres walk | | | | | 1:41:33 | 26 |
| Jung Soon-ok | Long jump | 6.45 | 22 | | | did not advance | |
