= Jinghong (disambiguation) =

Jinghong is a county-level city in Yunnan, China. Jinghong is also the pinyin romanization of multiple Chinese given names, sometimes romanized as Ching-hung in the Wade–Giles scheme. Notable people with the name Jinghong include:

- Li Jinghong, Chinese chemist of Mongol ethnicity
- Jean Chen Shih, biochemist, born Chen Jinghong
- Wang Jinghong (died c. 1434), a Ming dynasty Chinese marine
