= Mongolia at the 2022 World Athletics Championships =

- Flag of Mongolia
- WA code: MGL

in Eugene, United States 15 July 2022 – 24 July 2022
- Competitors: 4 (3 men and 1 woman)
- Medals: Gold 0 Silver 0 Bronze 0 Total 0

World Athletics Championships appearances
- 1991; 1993; 1995; 1997; 1999; 2001; 2003; 2005; 2007; 2009; 2011; 2013; 2015; 2017; 2019; 2022; 2023

Mongolia competed at the 2022 World Athletics Championships in Eugene, United States, from 15 to 24 July 2022.

== Results ==
Mongolia entered 4 athletes.

Key

- NR = National record
- PB = Personal best
- SB = Season best

=== Men ===
Athlete	Event	Final	
Athlete	Event	Result	Rank
Bat-Ochiryn Ser-Od	Marathon	2:11:39 SB	26
Dambadarjaagiin Gantulga	Marathon	DNF	–
Tseveenravdangiin Byambajav	Marathon	2:14:44	42

=== Women ===
Athlete	Event	Final	
Athlete	Event	Result	Rank
Bayartsogtyn Mönkhzayaa	Marathon	2:46:09	30
