= South Korea at the 2019 World Athletics Championships =

- WA code: KOR

in Doha, Qatar 27 September 2019 – 6 October 2019
- Competitors: 4 in 3 events
- Medals: Gold 0 Silver 0 Bronze 0 Total 0

World Athletics Championships appearances (overview)
- 1983; 1987; 1991; 1993; 1995; 1997; 1999; 2001; 2003; 2005; 2007; 2009; 2011; 2013; 2015; 2017; 2019; 2022; 2023; 2025

South Korea competed at the 2019 World Athletics Championships in Doha, Qatar, from 27 September to 6 October 2019.

== Results ==
Key

- Q = Qualified for the next round
- q = Qualified for the next round as a fastest loser or, in field events, by position without achieving the qualifying target
- NR = National record
- PB = Personal best
- SB = Season best
- N/A = Round not applicable for the event

=== Men ===
Track and road events

Athlete	Event	Preliminary Round		Heat		Semifinal		Final	
Athlete	Event	Result	Rank	Result	Rank	Result	Rank	Result	Rank
Kim Kuk-young	100 metres	10.32	2 Q	10.32	32	Did not advance			
Choe Byeong-kwang	20 kilometres walk	—N/a						1:33:10	21
Kim Hyun-sub	20 kilometres walk	—N/a						1:42:13	37

Field events

Athlete	Event	Qualification		Final	
Athlete	Event	Distance	Position	Distance	Position
Jin Min-sub	Pole vault	5.45	25	Did not advance	
