= Go-eun =

- Hangul: 고은
- RR: Goeun
- MR: Koŭn
- IPA: [koɯn]

Go-eun is a Korean given name.

== People ==
People with this name include:

- Han Go-eun (born 1975), South Korean actress
- Byul (born Kim Go-eun, 1983), South Korean singer
- Kim Go-eun (born 1991), South Korean actress
- Yeum Go-eun (born 1994), South Korean long-distance runner
- Lee Go-eun (born 2009), South Korean actress

== Fictional characters ==
Fictional characters with this name include:

- Seo Go-eun, in the 2010 South Korean film Wedding Dress
- Lee Go-eun, in the 2012 South Korean television series The King of Dramas

== See also ==
- List of Korean given names
