= South Korea at the 2022 World Athletics Championships =

- Flag of South Korea
- WA code: KOR
- National federation: Korea Association of Athletics Federations
- Website: www.kaaf.or.kr

in Eugene, United States 15–24 July 2022
- Competitors: 3 (3 men) in 3 events
- Medals Ranked 33rd: Gold 0 Silver 1 Bronze 0 Total 1

World Athletics Championships appearances (overview)
- 1983; 1987; 1991; 1993; 1995; 1997; 1999; 2001; 2003; 2005; 2007; 2009; 2011; 2013; 2015; 2017; 2019; 2022; 2023; 2025

South Korea competed at the 2022 World Athletics Championships in Eugene, Oregon from 15 to 24 July 2022. South Korea had entered 3 athletes.

== Medalists ==
Medal	Athlete	Event	Date
Silver	Woo Sang-hyeok	Men's high jump	18 July

== Results ==
Key

- Q = Qualified for the next round
- q = Not qualified for the next round as a fastest loser or, in field events, by position without achieving the qualifying target
- NR = National record
- PB = Personal best
- SB = Season best
- N/A = Round not applicable for the event

=== Men ===
Track and road events

Athlete	Event	Heat		Semi-final		Final	
Athlete	Event	Result	Rank	Result	Rank	Result	Rank
Oh Joo-han	Marathon	—N/a				DNF	
Choe Byeong-kwang	20 kilometres walk	—N/a				1:28:56	34

Field events

Athlete	Event	Qualification		Final	
Athlete	Event	Distance	Position	Distance	Position
Woo Sang-hyeok	High jump	2.28	1 q	2.35 =NR	2nd place, silver medalist(s)
