= South Korea at the 2009 World Championships in Athletics =

- WA code: KOR
- National federation: Korea Association of Athletics Federations
- Website: www.kaaf.or.kr

in Berlin
- Competitors: 18
- Medals: Gold 0 Silver 0 Bronze 0 Total 0

World Championships in Athletics appearances
- 1983; 1987; 1991; 1993; 1995; 1997; 1999; 2001; 2003; 2005; 2007; 2009; 2011; 2013; 2015; 2017; 2019; 2022; 2023; 2025

South Korea competed at the 2009 World Championships in Athletics from 15 to 23 August. A team of 18 athletes was announced in preparation for the competition.

== Team selection ==
Event	Athletes	
Event	Men	Women
110 metres hurdles	Lee Jung-joon; Park Tae-Kyong	
Marathon	Lee Myong-seung; Lee Myong-ki; Yook Geuntae; Ji Youngjun	Sun Suk Yun; Park Ho-sun; Lee Sun-Young
20 km walk	Park Chil-Sung; Kim Hyun-Sub; Byun Youngjun	
Pole vault	Kim Yoo Suk	Lim Eun-Ji
Long jump	Kim Deok-Hyeon	Jung Soon-Ok
Triple jump	Kim Deok-Hyeon	
Javelin throw	Park Jae-Myong; Jung Sang-Jin	

== Results ==
=== Men ===
Athlete	Event	Heats Qualification		Semifinals		Final	
Athlete	Event	Time Width Height	Rank	Time Width Height	Rank	Time Width Height	Rank
Lee Jung-joon	110 m hurdles	13.83 (SB)	36	Did not advance			
Park Tae-kyong	110 m hurdles	13.93	40	Did not advance			
Lee Myong-seung	Marathon					2:21:54 (SB)	46
Lee Myong-ki	Marathon					2:35:12	65
Yook Geun-tae	Marathon					2:40:47	69
Ji Young-Jun	Marathon					DNF	
Hwang Jun-Hyeon	Marathon					DNS	
Park Chil-sung	20 kilometres walk					1:24:01	25
Kim Hyun-sub	20 kilometres walk					1:27:08	34
Byun Young-jun	20 kilometres walk					1:30:35	43
Kim Deok-hyeon	Long jump	7.99	15			Did not advance	
Kim Deok-hyeon	Triple jump	16.58	24			Did not advance	
Kim Yoo-suk	Pole vault	5.55 (SB)	19			Did not advance	
Park Jae-myong	Javelin throw	78.16	18			Did not advance	
Jung Sang-jin	Javelin throw	72.80	36			Did not advance	

=== Women ===
Athlete	Event	Heats Qualification		Semifinals		Final	
Athlete	Event	Time Width Height	Rank	Time Width Height	Rank	Time Width Height	Rank
Yun Sun-suk	Marathon					2:39:56	39
Park Ho-sun	Marathon					2:47:16	53
Lee Sun-young	Marathon					DNF	
Jung Soon-ok	Long jump	6.49	14			Did not advance	
Lim Eun-ji	Pole vault	4.10	29			Did not advance	
