= South Korea at the 2005 World Championships in Athletics =

- WA code: KOR
- National federation: Korea Association of Athletics Federations
- Website: www.kaaf.or.kr

in Helsinki
- Competitors: 10
- Medals: Gold 0 Silver 0 Bronze 0 Total 0

World Championships in Athletics appearances
- 1983; 1987; 1991; 1993; 1995; 1997; 1999; 2001; 2003; 2005; 2007; 2009; 2011; 2013; 2015; 2017; 2019; 2022; 2023; 2025

South Korea competed at the 2005 World Championships in Athletics from August 6 to 14. A team of 10 athletes was announced in preparation for the competition.

== Results ==
=== Men ===
Athlete	Event	Heats Qualification		Quarterfinals		Semifinals		Final	
Athlete	Event	Time Width Height	Rank	Time Width Height	Rank	Time Width Height	Rank	Time Width Height	Rank
Lee Jae-hoon	800 metres	1:47.90 (SB)	23			did not advance			
Je In-Mo	Marathon							2:26:39	54
Cho Keun-Hyung	Marathon							2:31:59	60
Kim Yi-Yong	Marathon							DNF	
Shin Il-Yong	20 kilometres walk							1:23:10 (SB)	16
Kim Dong-Young	50 kilometres walk							4:01:25 (SB)	16
Kim Yoo-Suk	Pole vault	No Mark						Did not advance	

=== Women ===
Athlete	Event	Heats Qualification		Quarterfinals		Semifinals		Final	
Athlete	Event	Time Width Height	Rank	Time Width Height	Rank	Time Width Height	Rank	Time Width Height	Rank
Oh Jung-hee	Marathon							2:47:42	44
Kim Mi-jung	20 kilometres walk							1:37:01	29
Lee Mi-Young	Shot put	16.60	23					did not advance	
