= Mongolia at the 2009 World Championships in Athletics =

- WA code: MGL

in Berlin
- Competitors: 2
- Medals: Gold 0 Silver 0 Bronze 0 Total 0

World Championships in Athletics appearances
- 1991; 1993; 1995; 1997; 1999; 2001; 2003; 2005; 2007; 2009; 2011; 2013; 2015; 2017; 2019; 2022; 2023; 2025

Mongolia competed at the 2009 World Championships in Athletics from 15 to 23 August in Berlin. Both of the athletes competed in the men's and women's marathon events.

== Team selection ==
Event	Athletes	
Event	Men	Women
Marathon	Bat-Ochiryn Ser-Od	Luvsanlkhündegiin Otgonbayar

== Results ==
Event	Athletes	Final	
Event	Athletes	Result	Rank
Marathon	Bat-Ochiryn Ser-Od	2:17:22 SB	29
Marathon	Luvsanlkhündegiin Otgonbayar		
