= South Korea at the 2003 World Championships in Athletics =

- WA code: KOR
- National federation: Korea Association of Athletics Federations
- Website: www.kaaf.or.kr

in Paris
- Competitors: 7
- Medals: Gold 0 Silver 0 Bronze 0 Total 0

World Championships in Athletics appearances
- 1983; 1987; 1991; 1993; 1995; 1997; 1999; 2001; 2003; 2005; 2007; 2009; 2011; 2013; 2015; 2017; 2019; 2022; 2023; 2025

South Korea competed at the 2003 World Championships in Athletics from August 23 to 31. A team of 7 athletes was announced in preparation for the competition.

== Results ==
=== Men ===
Athlete	Event	Heats Qualification		Quarterfinals		Semifinals		Final	
Athlete	Event	Time Width Height	Rank	Time Width Height	Rank	Time Width Height	Rank	Time Width Height	Rank
Lee Bong-Ju	Marathon							2:10:38	11
Lee Myong-Seung	Marathon							2:16:46	40
Ji Young-Jun	Marathon							2:20:21	52
Kim Yi-Yong	Marathon							DNF	
Lee Dae-Ro	20 kilometres walk							DQ	

=== Women ===
Athlete	Event	Heats Qualification		Quarterfinals		Semifinals		Final	
Athlete	Event	Time Width Height	Rank	Time Width Height	Rank	Time Width Height	Rank	Time Width Height	Rank
Choi Kyung-Hee	Marathon							2:43:38	53
Kim Mi-Jung	20 kilometres walk							DQ	
