= Qinglong Temple =

Qinglong Temple (simplified Chinese: 青龙寺; traditional Chinese: 青龍寺; pinyin: Qīnglóng Sì) may refer to:

- Qinglong Temple (Xi'an), in Xi'an, Shaanxi, China
- Qinglong Temple (Jishan County), in Jishan County, Shanxi, China
- Main Hall of the Qinglong Temple, a major historical and cultural site in Lushan County, Sichuan
- A temple in Qingpu District, Shanghai; see Shanghai Rush

== See also ==
- Qinglong (disambiguation)
