= Claire McCarthy (runner) =

Irish long-distance runner

Personal information
- Nationality: Irish
- Born: 29 June 1976 (age 50)

Sport
- Country: Ireland
- Sport: Long-distance running
- Event(s): Marathon; Half marathon 10,000 metres
- Club: Leevale Athletic Club

Achievements and titles
- Personal best(s): 10000m: 34:47; Half-marathon: 1:15:18; Marathon: 2:38:00

Claire McCarthy (born 29 June 1976; also called Claire McCarthy Gibbons) is an Irish long-distance runner. She represented Ireland at the 2017 World Championships in Athletics where she competed in the marathon and finished in 33rd place.
