= North Korea at the 2017 World Championships in Athletics =

- WA code: PRK

in London
- Competitors: 3
- Medals: Gold 0 Silver 0 Bronze 0 Total 0

World Championships in Athletics appearances
- 1983; 1987–1997; 1999; 2001; 2003; 2005; 2007; 2009; 2011; 2013; 2015; 2017; 2019; 2022; 2023

North Korea competed at the 2017 World Championships in Athletics held in London, Great Britain, from 4–13 August 2017. The country was represented by three athletes, all of them runners taking part in the women's marathon event on 6 August. Kim Hye-gyong finished the highest, ranking 15th, with a season's best of 2:30:29. Jo Un-ok finished 29th and Kim Hye-song did not finish the race.

== Results ==
(SB – season best)

=== Women ===
==== Track and road events ====
Athlete	Event	Final	
Athlete	Event	Result	Rank
Jo Un-ok	Marathon	2:36:46	29
Kim Hye-song	Marathon	DNF	–
Kim Hye-gyong	Marathon	2:30:29 SB	15

== See also ==
- Sport in North Korea
- Women in North Korea
