= Marisa Casanueva =

Spanish long-distance runner

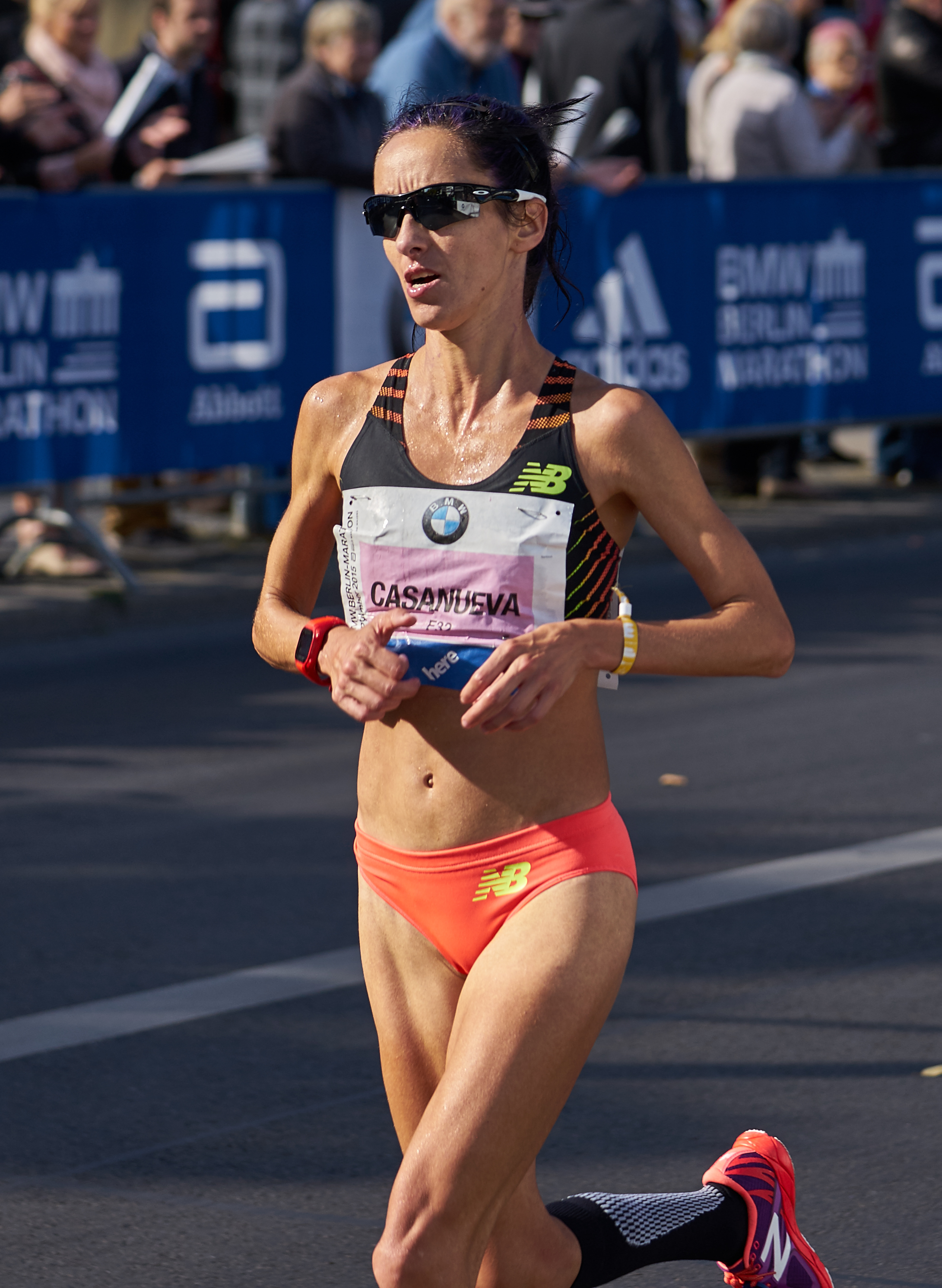
- Casanueva at the 2015 Berlin Marathon

Personal information
- Nationality: Spanish
- Born: 4 February 1981 (age 44)

Sport
- Sport: Long-distance running
- Event: Marathon

Marisa Casanueva Cabrero (born 4 February 1981) is a Spanish long-distance runner. She competed in the women's marathon at the 2017 World Championships in Athletics.
