= Noh Si-hwan =

South Korean long-distance runner

Personal information
- Born: 6 September 1992 (age 33)
- Height: 177 cm (5 ft 10 in)
- Weight: 61 kg (134 lb)

Sport
- Country: South Korea
- Sport: Track and field
- Event: long-distance running

Korean name
- Hangul: 노시환
- RR: No Sihwan
- MR: No Sihwan
- Updated on 29 August 2015

Noh Si-hwan (Korean: 노시환; born 6 September 1992) is a male South Korean long-distance runner. He competed in the marathon event at the 2015 World Championships in Athletics in Beijing, China.

At the 2015 World Championships, Noh was 39 seconds behind the leader until the 20 km mark, but gradually fell back after that. He was considered "the next generation of Korean marathon runners" by Korean media.

== See also ==
- South Korea at the 2015 World Championships in Athletics
