= Mongolia at the 2013 World Championships in Athletics =

- WA code: MGL
- National federation: Mongolian Athletic Federation

in Moscow
- Competitors: 2
- Medals: Gold 0 Silver 0 Bronze 0 Total 0

World Championships in Athletics appearances
- 1991; 1993; 1995; 1997; 1999; 2001; 2003; 2005; 2007; 2009; 2011; 2013; 2015; 2017; 2019; 2022; 2023

Mongolia competed at the 2013 World Championships in Athletics in Moscow, Russia, from 10–18 August 2013. A team of 2 athletes was announced to represent the country in the event.

== Team Mongolia ==
Mongolia sent a team of athletes to participate in the championships, competing in the athletics events as part of the international competition. The team consisted of a small number of athletes, as Mongolia is not traditionally known for its strong presence in track and field events.

== Performance ==
Mongolia did not win any medals at the 2013 World Championships in Athletics. Despite this, their participation highlighted the country’s growing involvement in international athletics competitions.

Mongolian athletes faced tough competition from countries with stronger track and field traditions, but their participation provided valuable experience for future competitions.

=== Notable Performances ===
While no athletes from Mongolia reached the final rounds or podiums, the championships offered them an opportunity to compete at a high level, learn from other international competitors, and potentially set new personal records.

== Results ==
(q – qualified, NM – no mark, SB – season best)

=== Men ===
Athlete	Event	Preliminaries	Heats	Semifinals	Final								
Athlete	Event	Preliminaries	Heats	Semifinals	Final	Time	Rank	Time	Rank	Time	Rank	Time	Rank
Ser-Od Bat-Ochir	Marathon												

=== Women ===
Athlete	Event	Preliminaries	Heats	Semifinals	Final								
Athlete	Event	Preliminaries	Heats	Semifinals	Final	Time	Rank	Time	Rank	Time	Rank	Time	Rank
Otgonbayar Luvsanlundeg	Marathon												

== History of Mongolia at the World Championships in Athletics ==
Mongolia has been a part of the IAAF World Championships in Athletics for several years but has yet to secure a medal in these prestigious events. The country’s athletes mainly compete in long-distance races, javelin throws, and other field disciplines.
