= 2017 World Championships in Athletics – Men's 50 kilometres walk =

Men's 50 kilometres walk at the 2017 World Championships
- Venue: Olympic Stadium
- Dates: 13 August (final)
- Competitors: 48 from 27 nations
- Winning time: 3:33:12

Medalists
gold medal	Yohann Diniz	France
silver medal	Hirooki Arai	Japan
bronze medal	Kai Kobayashi	Japan

The men's 50 kilometres race walk at the 2017 World Championships in Athletics was held on a two kilometre course comprising lengths of The Mall between Buckingham Palace and Admiralty Arch on 13 August.

The winning margin was 8 minutes 5 seconds which as of 2024 is the only time the men's 50 km walk has been won by more than four minutes at these championships. In 2022, the event was discontinued and replaced with the 35 km walk.

== Summary ==
Four days before the event, three-time World Championship medallist, Australia's Jared Tallent was forced to withdraw from the event due to a hamstring injury.

From the start, world record holder, 39 year old Yohann Diniz (FRA) walked with a sense of purpose. Save a silver medal in 2007, the World Championships had resulted in disqualifications and failure for him as had the Olympics. On this course in 2012, Diniz became disoriented and was left by the lead pack lying on the ground after he tripped over a barricade.

From the gun, Diniz walked at his own pace at the front of the pack. He made a quick, unplanned pit stop before the 5k mark which brought him back to the pack of some 20 competitors, however only Horacio Nava (MEX) was able to keep pace with him for a short while. Again Diniz walked solo and continued increasing his lead; 41 seconds at 10k, 1:32 at 15k, 2:10 at 20k, 2:59 by halfway.

Chasing Diniz was a pack of podium suitors that stayed together with individuals falling off the back. By half way it was down to seven, with two Ecudorians; Claudio Villanueva and Andrés Chocho; two Japanese Hirooki Arai and Kai Kobayashi; Aleksi Ojala (FIN); Evan Dunfee (CAN); and Yu Wei (CHN). That group stayed together past 35k, where Diniz had a 4:21 lead. At 36k, the two Japanese teammates took off on their own. In the next 4k, they put 27 seconds on the next challenger Dunfee, while Chocho was disqualified for form violation and asked off the course.

Diniz did not suffer a catastrophe. By the last 2k loop, he had lapped everybody except four walkers. Like his world record three years earlier, Diniz spent the last lap celebrating; tying a French flag around his neck like a bandana, slapping hands with the spectators in the front row. He held the French flag above his head as he crossed the finish line. The two Japanese worked together to keep up the pace, the more experienced Arai finally taking a slight lead for silver, 8:05 behind Diniz. It was the second fastest 50k racewalk of all time, only behind Diniz' world record and the largest margin of victory in World Championship history.

== Records ==
Before the competition records were as follows:

Record	Perf.	Athlete	Nat.	Date	Location
World	3:32:33	Yohann Diniz	FRA	15 Aug 2014	Zürich, Switzerland
Championship	3:36:03	Robert Korzeniowski	POL	27 Aug 2003	Saint-Denis, France
World leading	3:43:05	Dementiy Cheparev	RUS	10 Jun 2017	Cheboksary, Russia
African	3:54:12	Marc Mundell	RSA	13 Dec 2015	Melbourne, Australia
Asian	3:36:06	Yu Chaohong	CHN	22 Oct 2005	Nanjing, China
NACAC	3:41:09	Erick Barrondo	GUA	23 Mar 2013	Dudince, Slovakia
South American	3:42:57	Andrés Chocho	ECU	6 Mar 2016	Ciudad Juárez, Mexico
European	3:32:33	Yohann Diniz	FRA	15 Aug 2014	Zürich, Switzerland
Oceanian	3:35:47	Nathan Deakes	AUS	2 Dec 2006	Geelong, Australia

The following records were set at the competition:

Record	Perf.	Athlete	Nat.	Date
Championship	3:33:12	Yohann Diniz	FRA	13 Aug 2017
World leading	3:33:12	Yohann Diniz	FRA	13 Aug 2017
New Zealand	3:46:29	Quentin Rew	NZL	13 Aug 2017
Hungarian	3:43:56	Máté Helebrandt	HUN	13 Aug 2017

== Qualification standard ==
The standard to qualify automatically for entry was 4:06:00.

== Results ==
The final took place on 13 August at 07:46. The results were as follows:

Rank	Name	Nationality	Time	Notes
1st place, gold medalist(s)	Yohann Diniz	France	3:33:12	CR
2nd place, silver medalist(s)	Hirooki Arai	Japan	3:41:17	SB
3rd place, bronze medalist(s)	Kai Kobayashi	Japan	3:41:19	PB
4	Ihor Hlavan	Ukraine	3:41:42	SB
5	Satoshi Maruo	Japan	3:43:03	PB
6	Máté Helebrandt	Hungary	3:43:56	NR
7	Rafał Augustyn	Poland	3:44:18	SB
8	Robert Heffernan	Ireland	3:44:41	SB
9	Marco De Luca	Italy	3:45:02	SB
10	Carl Dohmann	Germany	3:45:21	PB
11	João Vieira	Portugal	3:45:28	SB
12	Quentin Rew	New Zealand	3:46:29	NR
13	Karl Junghannß	Germany	3:47:01	PB
14	Aleksi Ojala	Finland	3:47:20	SB
15	Evan Dunfee	Canada	3:47:36	
16	Horacio Nava	Mexico	3:47:53	SB
17	José Ignacio Díaz	Spain	3:48:08	PB
18	Claudio Villanueva	Ecuador	3:49:27	PB
19	Ivan Banzeruk	Ukraine	3:49:49	
20	Jorge Armando Ruiz	Colombia	3:50:37	PB
21	José Leyver Ojeda	Mexico	3:51:17	
22	Rafał Fedaczyński	Poland	3:52:11	
23	Jarkko Kinnunen	Finland	3:55:44	SB
24	Adrian Błocki	Poland	3:55:49	
25	Mathieu Bilodeau	Canada	3:56:54	SB
26	Francisco Arcilla	Spain	3:57:27	
27	Maryan Zakalnytskyy	Ukraine	3:57:29	
28	Anders Hansson	Sweden	3:58:00	PB
29	Park Chil-sung	South Korea	3:59:46	SB
30	Niu Wenbin	China	4:01:35	
31	Narcis Ștefan Mihăilă	Romania	4:02:27	PB
32	Pedro Isidro	Portugal	4:02:30	
33	Ronald Quispe	Bolivia	4:08.22	SB
	Michele Antonelli	Italy	DNF	
	Luis Fernando López	Colombia	DNF	
	Dušan Majdán	Slovakia	DNF	
	Arturas Mastianica	Lithuania	DNF	
	Iván Pajuelo	Spain	DNF	
	Yu Wei	China	DNF	
	Edward Araya	Chile	DQ	230.6(a)
	Andrés Chocho	Ecuador	DQ	230.6(a)
	Alejandro Francisco Flórez	Switzerland	DQ	230.6(a)
	Håvard Haukenes	Norway	DQ	230.6(a)
	Dominic King	Great Britain & N.I.	DQ	230.6(a)
	Aku Partanen	Finland	DQ	230.6(a)
	Florin Alin Știrbu	Romania	DQ	230.6(a)
	Omar Zepeda	Mexico	DQ	230.6(a)
	Brendan Boyce	Ireland	DNS	
