= Monika Athare =

Indian long-distance runner

Personal information
- Nationality: Indian
- Born: 26 March 1992 (age 34) Nashik, Maharashtra, India

Sport
- Sport: Long-distance running
- Event: Marathon

Monika Athare (born 26 March 1992) is an Indian long-distance runner. She competed in the women's marathon at the 2017 World Championships in Athletics.
