= South Korea at the 1995 World Championships in Athletics =

- WA code: KOR
- National federation: Korea Association of Athletics Federations
- Website: www.kaaf.or.kr

in Gothenburg
- Competitors: 6
- Medals: Gold 0 Silver 0 Bronze 0 Total 0

World Championships in Athletics appearances
- 1983; 1987; 1991; 1993; 1995; 1997; 1999; 2001; 2003; 2005; 2007; 2009; 2011; 2013; 2015; 2017; 2019; 2022; 2023; 2025

South Korea competed in the 1995 World Championships in Athletics from August 5 to 13. A team of 6 athletes was announced in preparation for the competition.

== Results ==
Key

- Q = Qualified for the next round
- q = Qualified for the next round as a fastest loser or, in field events, by position without achieving the qualifying target
- NR = National record
- PB = Personal best
- SB = Season best
- N/A = Round not applicable for the event

=== Men ===
Track and road events

Athlete	Event	Heats Qualification		Quarterfinals		Semifinals		Final	
Athlete	Event	Time Width Height	Rank	Time Width Height	Rank	Time Width Height	Rank	Time Width Height	Rank
Shon Ju-Il	400 metres	46.41	32 Q	46.31	27	Did not advance			
Lee Bong-Ju	Marathon							2:20:31	22
Kim Yong-Bok	Marathon							Did not finish	

Field events

Athlete	Event	Preliminaries		Final	
Athlete	Event	Distance	Position	Distance	Position
Lee Jin-Taek	High jump	2.24	24	Did not advance	
Kim Chul-Kyun	Pole vault	5.40	21	Did not advance	
Kim Ki-Hoon	Javelin throw	70.20	32	Did not advance	
