= Tarah Korir =

Canadian long-distance runner

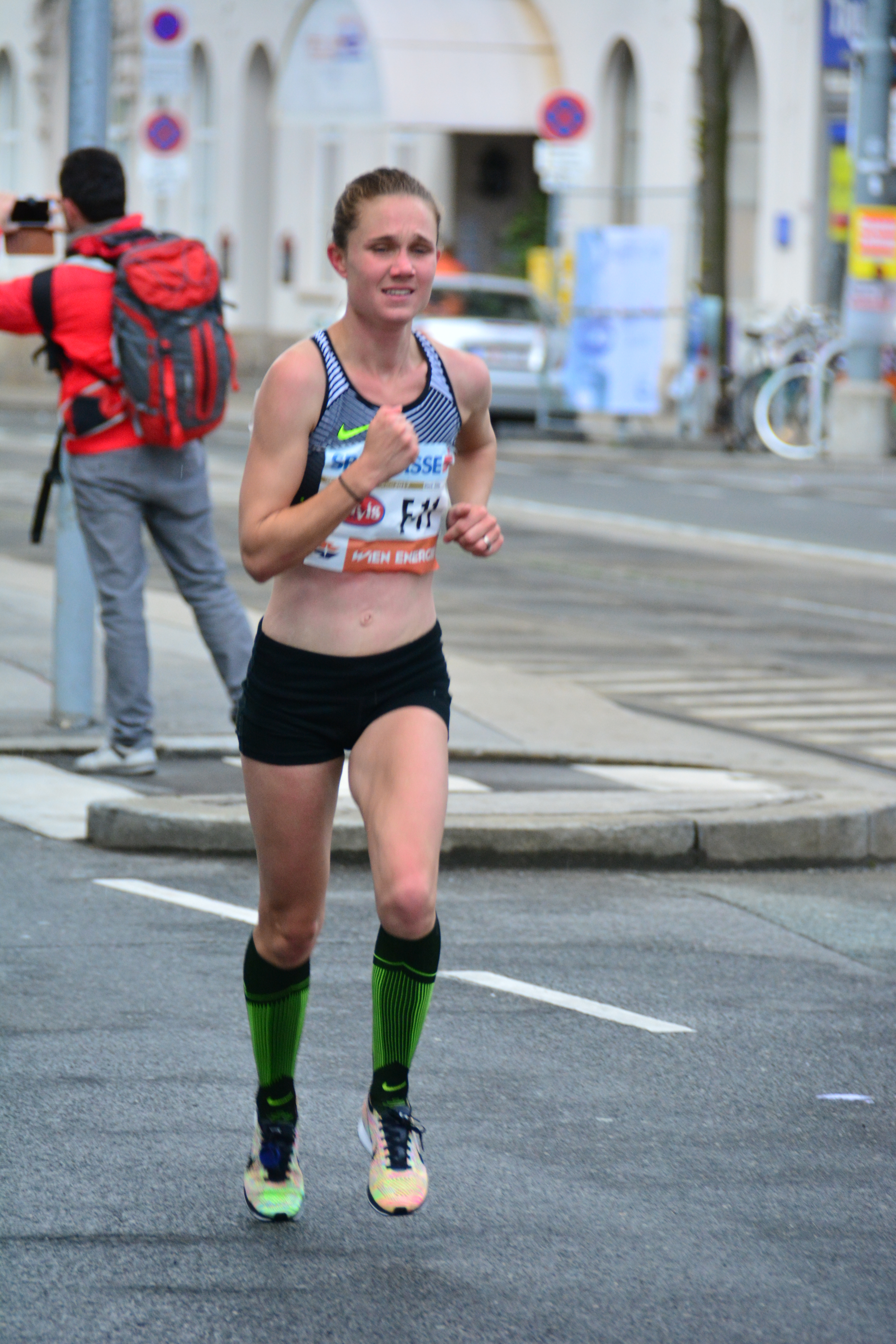
- Korir at the 2017 Vienna City Marathon

Personal information
- Born: Tarah McKay; 1 May 1987 (age 38) Waterloo, Ontario, Canada
- Spouse: Wesley Korir (m. 2010)

Sport
- Sport: Long-distance running
- Event: Marathon

Tarah Korir (née McKay, born 1 May 1987) is a Canadian long-distance runner. She competed in the women's marathon at the 2017 World Championships in Athletics.
