= Kai Kobayashi =

Japanese racewalker

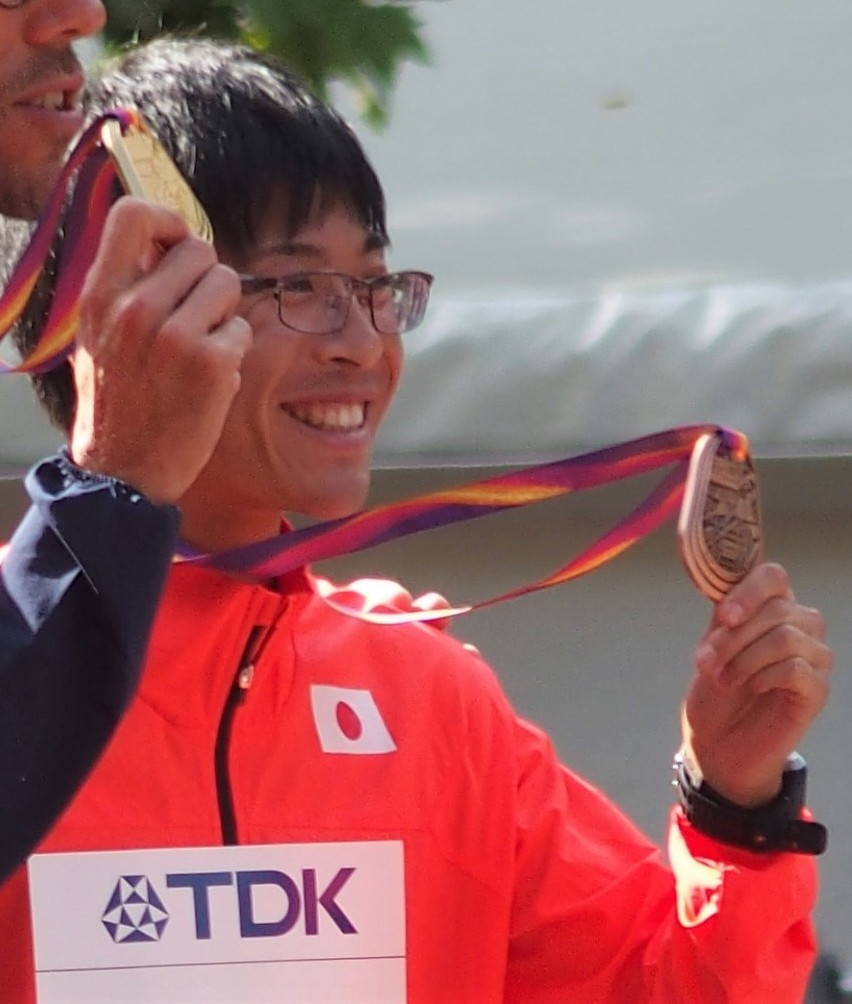

Personal information
- Born: 28 February 1993 (age 33) Tokyo, Japan

Sport
- Country: Japan
- Sport: Track and field
- Event: Racewalking
Medal record
World Championships
Bronze medal – third place	2017 London	50 km walk

Kai Kobayashi (小林 快, Kobayashi Kai; born 28 February 1993) is a Japanese racewalker. He competed in the 50 kilometres walk event at the 2017 World Championships in Athletics in London, UK, placing third and receiving a bronze medal.

== See also ==
- Japan at the 2017 World Championships in Athletics
