= South Korea at the 1999 World Championships in Athletics =

- WA code: KOR
- National federation: Korea Association of Athletics Federations
- Website: www.kaaf.or.kr

in Seville
- Competitors: 8
- Medals: Gold 0 Silver 0 Bronze 0 Total 0

World Championships in Athletics appearances
- 1983; 1987; 1991; 1993; 1995; 1997; 1999; 2001; 2003; 2005; 2007; 2009; 2011; 2013; 2015; 2017; 2019; 2022; 2023; 2025

South Korea competed at the 1999 World Championships in Athletics from August 21 to 29. A team of 8 athletes was announced in preparation for the competition.

== Results ==
=== Men ===
Athlete	Event	Heats Qualification		Quarterfinals		Semifinals		Final	
Athlete	Event	Time Width Height	Rank	Time Width Height	Rank	Time Width Height	Rank	Time Width Height	Rank
Kim Soon-Hyung	800 metres	1:46.78	17 Q			1:47.15	15	Did not advance	
Hyung Jae-Young	Marathon							2:18:19	21
Lee Jin-Taek	High jump	2.29 (SB)	8 Q					2.29 (SB)	6
Sung Hee-Jun	Long jump	7.62	33					Did not advance	
Yu Nam-Sung	Javelin throw	72.87	26					Did not advance	

=== Women ===
Athlete	Event	Heats Qualification		Quarterfinals		Semifinals		Final	
Athlete	Event	Time Width Height	Rank	Time Width Height	Rank	Time Width Height	Rank	Time Width Height	Rank
Kim Mi-Jung	20 kilometres walk							1:46:36	39
Lee Myung-Sun	Shot put	18.37	8 Q					17.92	10
Lee Young-Sun	Javelin throw	51.36	27					Did not advance	
