= South Korea at the 2011 World Championships in Athletics =

- WA code: KOR
- National federation: Korea Association of Athletics Federations
- Website: www.kaaf.or.kr

in Daegu
- Competitors: 53
- Medals Ranked 35th: Gold 0 Silver 0 Bronze 1 Total 1

World Championships in Athletics appearances
- 1983; 1987; 1991; 1993; 1995; 1997; 1999; 2001; 2003; 2005; 2007; 2009; 2011; 2013; 2015; 2017; 2019; 2022; 2023

South Korea competed at the 2011 World Championships in Athletics from August 27 to September 4 in Daegu, South Korea as the host nation.

== Team selection ==
A team of 63 athletes was announced to represent the country in the event. The team was led by 110-meter hurdler Park Tae-kyong. Furthermore, the team includes 3 athletes invited by the IPC for exhibition events: Jung Dong-ho and Yoo Byung-hoon, 400m T53 (wheelchair) men, and Kang Kyung-sun, 800m T54 (wheelchair) women.

The following athletes appeared on the preliminary Entry List, but not on the Official Start List of the specific event, resulting in a total number of 53 competitors:

KEY:	Did not participate	Competed in another event

	Event	Athlete
Men	4 x 100 metres relay	Jeon Duk-hyung
Men	4 x 100 metres relay	Kim Jin-Kuk
Men	4 x 400 metres relay	Choi Myung-jun
Men	4 x 400 metres relay	Kim Jaedeok
Women	4 x 100 metres relay	Jung Hye-lim
Women	4 x 100 metres relay	Joung Hansol
Women	4 x 400 metres relay	Jang Yea-eun
Women	4 x 400 metres relay	Seo In-ae

== Results ==
=== Men ===
Athlete	Event	Preliminaries		Heats		Semifinals		Final	
Athlete	Event	Time Width Height	Rank	Time Width Height	Rank	Time Width Height	Rank	Time Width Height	Rank
Kim Kuk-young	100 metres	DQ		Did not advance					
Park Bong-go	400 metres			46.42 (SB)	25	Did not advance			
Sin Sang-min	1500 metres			3:55.02	35	Did not advance			
Baek Seung-ho	5000 metres			15:01.37	34			Did not advance	
Jeong Jin-hyeok	Marathon							2:17:04	23
Lee Myong-seung	Marathon							2:18:05	28
Hwang Jun-Hyeon	Marathon							2:21:54 (SB)	35
Hwang Jun-Suk	Marathon							2:23:47	40
Kim Min	Marathon							2:27:20 (SB)	44
Park Tae-kyong	110 m hurdles			13.83	26	Did not advance			
Lee Seung-yun	400 m hurdles			52.98	34	Did not advance			
Yeo Ho-suah; Cho Kyu-won; Kim Kuk-young; Lim Hee-nam	4 x 100 metres relay			38.94 (NR)	13			Did not advance	
Park Bong-go; Lim Chan-ho; Lee Jun; Seong Hyeok-je	4 x 400 metres relay			3:04.05 (NR)	15			Did not advance	
Byun Young-jun	20 kilometres walk							1:24:48	25
Kim Hyun-sub	20 kilometres walk							1:21:17	3rd place, bronze medalist(s)
Park Chil-sung	20 kilometres walk							DNF	
Park Chil-sung	50 kilometres walk							3:47:13 (NR)	7
Kim Dong-young	50 kilometres walk							3:51:12 (PB)	14
Yim Jung-hyun	50 kilometres walk							DQ	
Kim Deok-hyeon	Long jump	8.02 (SB)	11					DNS	
Kim Deok-hyeon	Triple jump	No Mark						Did not advance	
Yun Ye-hwan	High jump	No Mark						Did not advance	
Kim Yoo-suk	Pole vault	5.20	26					Did not advance	
Hwang In-sung	Shot put	17.75	27					Did not advance	
Lee Yun-chul	Hammer throw	68.98 (SB)	29					Did not advance	
Jung Sang-jin	Javelin throw	72.03	34					Did not advance	

Decathlon

Kim Kun-woo	Decathlon			
Kim Kun-woo	Event	Results	Points	Rank
	100 m	11.11 (SB)	836	19
	Long jump	7.24 (SB)	871	16
	Shot put	12.96 (SB)	665	26
	High jump	1.96 (SB)	767	20
	400 m	49.24	850	10
	110 m hurdles	14.95 (SB)	856	24
	Discus throw	39.53	655	23
	Pole vault	4.90 (PB)	880	6
	Javelin throw	53.33	638	20
	1500 m	4:15.63 (SB)	842	2
Total			7860 (NR)	17

=== Women ===
Athlete	Event	Preliminaries		Heats		Semifinals		Final	
Athlete	Event	Time Width Height	Rank	Time Width Height	Rank	Time Width Height	Rank	Time Width Height	Rank
Jung Hye-lim	100 metres	11.90	3 Q	11.88	40	Did not advance			
Huh Yeon-jung	800 metres			2:08.05	34	Did not advance			
Kim Sung-eun	Marathon							2:37:05 (SB)	28
Lee Sook-jung	Marathon							2:40:23	34
Chung Yun-hee	Marathon							2:42:28	35
Park Jun-sook	Marathon							3:03:34	43
Choi Bo-ra	Marathon							3:10:06	44
Jung Hye-lim	100 m hurdles			13.39	23	Did not advance			
Son Kyeong-mi	400 m hurdles			1:00.21	36	Did not advance			
Eum Jeesu; Kim So-yeon; Lee Sun-ae; Park So-yeun	4 x 100 metres relay			46.14 (SB)	16			Did not advance	
Woo Yu-jin; Lee Ha-nee; Oh Se-ra; Park Seongmyun	4 x 400 metres relay			3:43.22 (SB)	19			Did not advance	
Jeon Yong-eun	20 kilometres walk							1:35:52 (SB)	26
Jung Soon-ok	Long jump	6.18 (SB)	29					Did not advance	
Jung Hye-kyung	Triple jump	13.50	30					Did not advance	
Han Da-rye	High jump	1.75	29					Did not advance	
Choi Yun-hee	Pole vault	4.40 (NR)	19					Did not advance	
Lee Mi-young	Shot put	16.18	23					Did not advance	
Kang Na-ru	Hammer throw	61.05	30					Did not advance	
Kim Kyung-ae	Javelin throw	54.96	27					Did not advance	
