= Finland at the 2017 World Championships in Athletics =

- Flag of Finland
- WA code: FIN
- National federation: Finnish Amateur Athletic Association
- Website: yleisurheilu.fi (in Finnish)

in London, United Kingdom 4–13 August 2017
- Competitors: 12 (7 men and 5 women) in 10 events
- Medals: Gold 0 Silver 0 Bronze 0 Total 0

World Championships in Athletics appearances
- 1976; 1980; 1983; 1987; 1991; 1993; 1995; 1997; 1999; 2001; 2003; 2005; 2007; 2009; 2011; 2013; 2015; 2017; 2019; 2022; 2023; 2025

Finland competed at the 2017 World Championships in Athletics in London, United Kingdom, from 4 to 13 August 2017, and failed to win any medals. In the IAAF 1st to 8th placings table, they placed 54th with one fifth place.

== Results ==
=== Men ===
Track and road events

Athlete	Event	Heat		Semifinal		Final	
Athlete	Event	Time	Rank	Time	Rank	Time	Rank
Jarkko Kinnunen	50 kilometres walk	—N/a				3:55:44 SB	23
Aleksi Ojala	50 kilometres walk	—N/a				3:47:20 SB	14
Aku Partanen	50 kilometres walk	—N/a				DQ	

Field events

Athlete	Event	Qualification		Final	
Athlete	Event	Result	Rank	Result	Rank
Simo Lipsanen	Triple jump	16.54	17	Did not advance	
Arttu Pajulahti	Long jump	7.49	29	Did not advance	
Tero Pitkämäki	Javelin throw	85.97 Q	4	86.94	5
David Söderberg	Hammer throw	73.76	15	Did not advance	

=== Women ===
Track and road events

Athlete	Event	Heat		Semifinal		Final	
Athlete	Event	Time	Rank	Time	Rank	Time	Rank
Anne-Mari Hyryläinen	Marathon	—N/a				2:35:33	25
Camilla Richardsson	3000 metres steeplechase	10:07.04	36	—N/a		Did not advance	

Field events

Athlete	Event	Qualification		Final	
Athlete	Event	Result	Rank	Result	Rank
Kristiina Mäkelä	Triple jump	13.92	16	Did not advance	
Minna Nikkanen	Pole vault	4.20	20	Did not advance	
Linda Sandblom	High jump	1.80	29	Did not advance	
