= South Korea at the 2013 World Championships in Athletics =

- WA code: KOR

in Moscow
- Competitors: 16
- Medals: Gold 0 Silver 0 Bronze 0 Total 0

World Championships in Athletics appearances
- 1983; 1987; 1991; 1993; 1995; 1997; 1999; 2001; 2003; 2005; 2007; 2009; 2011; 2013; 2015; 2017; 2019; 2022; 2023; 2025

South Korea is competing at the 2013 World Championships in Athletics in Moscow, Russia, from 10–18 August 2013. A team of 16 athletes was announced to represent the country in the event.

== Results ==
(q – qualified, NM – no mark, SB – season best)

=== Men ===
Track and road events

Athlete	Event	Preliminaries		Heats		Semifinals		Final	
Athlete	Event	Time	Rank	Time	Rank	Time	Rank	Time	Rank
Minsub Jin; Kyu-won Cho; Jinkook Kim; Kukyoung Kim; Kyongsoo Oh; Min Woo Yoo	4 × 100 metres relay								
Jihun Sung	Marathon								
Youngjin Kim	Marathon								
Youngjun Byun	20 kilometres walk								
Byeong Kwang Choe	20 kilometres walk							1:28:26	39
Hyunsub Kim	20 kilometres walk							1:22:50	9
Sehan Oh	50 kilometres walk								
Junghyun Yim	50 kilometres walk								

Field events

Athlete	Event	Preliminaries		Final	
Athlete	Event	Width Height	Rank	Width Height	Rank
Minsub Jin	Pole vault				

=== Women ===
Track and road events

Athlete	Event	Preliminaries		Heats		Semifinals		Final	
Athlete	Event	Time	Rank	Time	Rank	Time	Rank	Time	Rank
Seongeun Kim	Marathon								
Yeongeun Jeon	20 kilometres walk								
