= South Korea at the 2015 World Championships in Athletics =

- WA code: KOR

in Beijing
- Competitors: 12
- Medals: Gold 0 Silver 0 Bronze 0 Total 0

World Championships in Athletics appearances
- 1983; 1987; 1991; 1993; 1995; 1997; 1999; 2001; 2003; 2005; 2007; 2009; 2011; 2013; 2015; 2017; 2019; 2022; 2023; 2025

South Korea competed at the 2015 World Championships in Athletics in Beijing, China, from 22–30 August 2015.

== Results ==
(q – qualified, NM – no mark, SB – season best)

=== Men ===
Track and road events

Athlete	Event	Heat		Semifinal		Final	
Athlete	Event	Result	Rank	Result	Rank	Result	Rank
Kim Kuk-young	100 metres	10.48	7	Did not advance			
Noh Si-hwan	Marathon	—N/a				2:32:35	39
Yu Seung-yeop	Marathon	—N/a				DNF	
Byun Young-jun	20 kilometres walk	—N/a				DQ	
Choe Byeong-kwang	20 kilometres walk	—N/a				1:28:01	45
Kim Hyun-sub	20 kilometres walk	—N/a				1:21:40	10
Park Chil-sung	50 kilometres walk	—N/a				3:56:42 SB	23

Field events

Athlete	Event	Qualification		Final	
Athlete	Event	Distance	Position	Distance	Position
Kim Deok-hyeon	Triple jump	16.72	14	Did not advance	

=== Women ===
Track and road events

Athlete	Event	Heat		Semifinal		Final	
Athlete	Event	Result	Rank	Result	Rank	Result	Rank
Kim Seongeun	Marathon	—N/a				2:42:14	30
Yeum Go-eun	Marathon	—N/a				2:46:46	41
Jeon Yeong-eun	20 kilometres walk	—N/a				1:35:48	27
Lee Jeong-eun	20 kilometres walk	—N/a				1:36:52	35
