= Yelena Nanaziashvili =

Kazakhstani long-distance runner

Personal information
- Nationality: Kazakhstani
- Born: 23 January 1981 (age 45)

Sport
- Sport: Long-distance running
- Event: Marathon

Yelena Nanaziashvili (born 23 January 1981) is a Kazakhstani long-distance runner. She competed in the women's marathon at the 2017 World Championships in Athletics.
