= Yu Seung-yeop =

South Korean long-distance runner

Personal information
- Born: 16 January 1992 (age 34)

Sport
- Country: South Korea
- Sport: Track and field
- Event: long-distance running
- Updated on 29 August 2015

- Yu Seung-yeop
- Hangul: 유승엽
- RR: Yu Seungyeop
- MR: Yu Sŭngyŏp

Yu Seung-yeop (born 16 January 1992) is a male South Korean long-distance runner. He competed in the marathon event at the 2015 World Championships in Athletics in Beijing, China.

Yu won the men’s domestic division of the 2017 Dong-A Marathon, which also served as the Seoul International Marathon.

== See also ==
- South Korea at the 2015 World Championships in Athletics
