= Liu Qinghong =

Chinese long-distance runner

Personal information
- Nationality: Chinese
- Born: 1 April 1996 (age 30)

Sport
- Sport: Long-distance running
- Event: Marathon

Liu Qinghong (born 1 April 1996) is a Chinese long-distance runner. She competed in the women's marathon at the 2017 World Championships in Athletics.
