= Catarina Ribeiro =

Portuguese long-distance runner

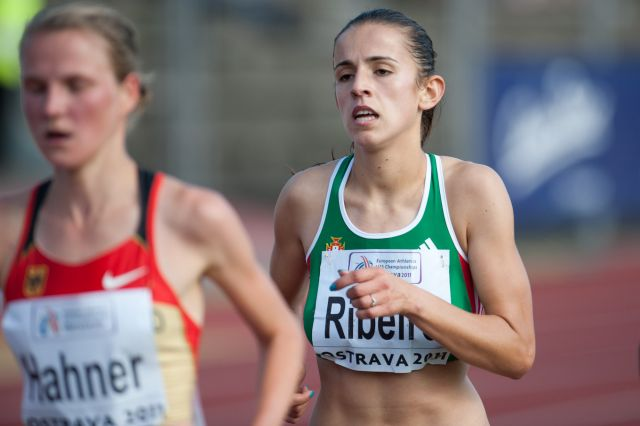
- Ribeiro in 2011

Personal information
- Full name: Sara Catarina Costa Pontes Ribeiro
- Born: 31 May 1990 (age 36) Lousada, Portugal
- Height: 1.70 m (5 ft 7 in)
- Weight: 54 kg (119 lb)

Sport
- Country: Portugal
- Sport: Track and field
- Event(s): 1500 metres 3000 metres 5000 metres 10,000 metres Marathon
Medal record
Track and field
Representing Portugal
European Athletics U23 Championships
Silver medal – second place	2011 Ostrava	Women's 10,000m
Ibero-American Athletics Championships
Bronze medal – third place	2012 Barquisimeto	Women's 3000m
Bronze medal – third place	2014 Sao Paulo	Women's 5000m

Sara Catarina Costa Pontes Ribeiro (born 31 May 1990), known as Catarina Ribeiro, is a Portuguese long distance runner who competes in international level events. Her highest achievement is winning a Bronze medal at the 2011 European Athletics U23 Championships in Ostrava.

Ribeiro is expected to compete in the women's marathon at the 2020 Summer Olympics.
