= Yeum Go-eun =

South Korean long-distance runner

Personal information
- Born: 18 October 1994 (age 31)

Sport
- Country: South Korea
- Sport: Track and field
- Event: long-distance running

Korean name
- Hangul: 염고은
- RR: Yeom Goeun
- MR: Yŏm Koŭn
- Updated on 2 September 2015

Yeum Go-eun (Korean: 염고은; born 18 October 1994) is a female South Korean long-distance runner. She competed in the marathon event at the 2015 World Championships in Athletics in Beijing, China.

At the 2010 South Korean Athletics Championships, Yeum set a Korean record of 15:38.60 in the 5000 m. After some years of dormancy, she was described as a 'marathon star' with several top domestic finishes by 2015.

== See also ==
- South Korea at the 2015 World Championships in Athletics
