= Satoshi Maruo =

Japanese racewalker

Satoshi Maruo (Japanese: 丸尾知司; born 28 November 1991) is a Japanese male athlete competing in the 50 kilometres race walk. He represented Japan at the 2016 IAAF World Race Walking Team Championships and the 2017 World Championships in Athletics, finishing fifth at the latter event in a personal best of 3:43:03 hours The Japanese team was very successful at the event with all three men finishing in the top five. He is a member of the Aichi Steel athletics team.

== International competitions ==
Year	Competition	Venue	Position	Event	Notes
2016	World Race Walking Team Championships	Rome, Italy	41st	20 km walk	1:23:38
2017	World Championships	London, United Kingdom	5th	50 km walk	3:43:03 PB
2018	Asian Games	Jakarta, Indonesia	4th	50 km walk	4:14:13
