= Mao Kiyota =

Japanese long-distance runner

Personal information
- Nationality: Japanese
- Born: 12 September 1993 (age 32)

Sport
- Sport: Long-distance running
- Event: Marathon

Mao Kiyota (清田 真央, Kiyota Mao; born 12 September 1993) is a Japanese long distance runner. She competed in the women's marathon at the 2017 World Championships in Athletics.
