= Qinghong (wine) =

Variety of Chinese rice wine

Qinghong (Chinese: 青红酒; pinyin: qīnghóng jiǔ, literally "blue/green-red alcohol") is a variety of huangjiu originally from Minhou County, Fuzhou, Fujian, China. Qinghong is produced from glutinous rice inoculated with a starter made of red yeast rice (Chinese: 紅麴米; pinyin: hóngqūmǐ/hóngqúmǐ).

== History ==
Records trace qinghong back to the year 202 BC. A commoner woman presented King Wuzhu of Minyue with her homemade rice wine. Its positive reception at the royal court led to its status as the royal wine for important occasions such as sacrifices and weddings in Minyue.

Red yeast rice was brought to Fujian by migrants fleeing the Central Plains of China after the Disaster of Yongjia in the 4th century AD. The specific qinghong of Minhou originated in the Tang dynasty and became popular after the Song dynasty.

In 2018, Minhou qinghong was registered as a China Time-honored Brand, and the production technique was selected as one of the fifth batch of representative intangible cultural heritage projects in Fuzhou.

In the 2020s, qinghong began to be produced by members of the Fuzhounese diaspora in New York City.

== Optical properties ==
A defining physical trait of qinghong is its optical fluorescence. While the wine appears as a deep, clear amber or red under standard ambient light, on looking closely at the meniscus or on passing a more concentrated light beam it reveals a distinct cyan or greenish-blue luminescence at the edges.

This visual phenomenon stems from the secondary metabolites produced during fermentation process. Complex azaphilone pigments (such as monascin and ankaflavin) as well as other polyphenols and even riboflavin (vitamin B2) are among those present. When these absorb photons and undergo electronic excitation, they subsequently emit a faint cool-toned fluorescence.

Traditionally, the presence of this blue-green is utilized as a baseline metric for quality control, signifying long-term maturation.
