= Jean Chen Shih =

Pharmacology researcher

Jean Chen Shih (Chinese: 陳景虹; pinyin: Chén Jǐnghóng; born 29 January 1942) is a Chinese-born biochemist.

Shih was born Chen Jinghong in China, the second of four children to an engineer father. Her mother came from a wealthy family. At the age of eight, she moved to Taiwan with her family. She studied biochemistry at National Taiwan University and earned her doctorate in the subject via a joint program at the University of California, Riverside and University of California, Los Angeles. Upon completing post doctoral research at UCLA, she began teaching at the USC Mann School of Pharmacy and Pharmaceutical Sciences in 1974, where she was eventually appointed Boyd and Elsie Welin Professor of Molecular Pharmacology and Toxicology. Shih became known for her research into monoamine oxidase. She became a member of Academia Sinica in 2002. In 2013, the USC–Taiwan Center for Translational Research was established, funded by the USC Daniel Tsai Fund for Translation Research in Pharmacy. Shih was named founding director. In 2018, she was inducted as a member of the USC chapter of the National Academy of Inventors.
