= South Korea at the 1997 World Championships in Athletics =

- WA code: KOR
- National federation: Korea Association of Athletics Federations
- Website: www.kaaf.or.kr

in Athens
- Competitors: 9
- Medals: Gold 0 Silver 0 Bronze 0 Total 0

World Championships in Athletics appearances
- 1983; 1987; 1991; 1993; 1995; 1997; 1999; 2001; 2003; 2005; 2007; 2009; 2011; 2013; 2015; 2017; 2019; 2022; 2023; 2025

South Korea competed at the 1997 World Championships in Athletics from August 2 to 10. A team of 9 athletes was announced in preparation for the competition.

== Results ==
=== Men ===
Athlete	Event	Heats Qualification		Quarterfinals		Semifinals		Final	
Athlete	Event	Time Width Height	Rank	Time Width Height	Rank	Time Width Height	Rank	Time Width Height	Rank
Lee Heyeong-Gum	100 metres	10.73	81	Did not advance					
Shon Ju-Il	400 metres	47.47	28 Q	47.36	31	Did not advance			
Baek Seung-Do	Marathon							2:22:40	26
Chang Ki-Shik	Marathon							Did not finish	
Lee Jin-Taek	High jump	2.28	T1 Q					2.29	8
Sung Hee-Jun	Long jump	7.63	28					Did not advance	
Chu Ki-Young	Javelin throw	70.84	31					Did not advance	

=== Women ===
Field events

Athlete	Event	Heats Qualification		Quarterfinals		Semifinals		Final	
Athlete	Event	Time Width Height	Rank	Time Width Height	Rank	Time Width Height	Rank	Time Width Height	Rank
Lee Myung-Sun	Shot put	16.39	23					Did not advance	
Lee Young-Sun	Javelin throw	55.98	22					Did not advance	
