= Li Jinghong =

Chinese chemist of Mongol ethnicity (born 1967)

- 李景虹
- Born: December 1967 (age 58); Inner Mongolia, China
- Education: University of Science and Technology of China
- Scientific career
- Fields: Electrochemistry; Bioelectrochemistry; Nanoelectrochemistry
- Workplaces: Tsinghua University

Li Jinghong (Chinese: 李景虹; pinyin: Lǐ Jǐnghóng; born December 1967) is a Chinese chemist of Mongol ethnicity. He is a professor and doctoral supervisor in the Department of Chemistry, Tsinghua University.

== Early life and education ==
Li was born in Inner Mongolia in December 1967. In September 1986 he entered the University of Science and Technology of China, where he graduated in July 1991. After graduation, he was assigned to Changchun Institute of Applied Chemistry, Chinese Academy of Sciences (CAS), where he obtained a Doctor of Science degree in December 1996. From 1997 to 2001 he was a postdoc at the University of Illinois Urbana Champaign, University of California, Santa Barbara, and Clemson University in the United States.

== Career ==
Li returned to China in May 2001 and that same year became researcher at the Changchun Institute of Applied Chemistry, Chinese Academy of Sciences (CAS) until September 2004. In 2004 he was hired by Tsinghua University as professor and doctoral supervisor.

He is a member of the Jiusan Society. In January 2018, he became a member of the 13th National Committee of the Chinese People's Political Consultative Conference.

== Honours and awards ==
- 2001 Distinguished Young Scholar by the National Science Fund
- 2006 Mao Yisheng Science and Technology Award
- 2009 "Chang Jiang Scholar" (or "Yangtze River Scholar")
- 2011 Basf Young Knowledge Innovation Award of Chinese Chemical Society
- Fellow of the Royal Society of Chemistry
- November 22, 2019 Member of the Chinese Academy of Sciences (CAS)
