= Qinglong =

Qinglong may refer to:

- The Azure Dragon, one of the Four Symbols of the Chinese constellations

== Locations in China ==
- Qinglong County, Guizhou (晴隆县)
- Qinglong Manchu Autonomous County, Hebei

=== Towns ===
- Qinglong Town, Anhui
- Qinglong, Chongqing
- Qinglong, Guizhou
- Qinglong, Hebei, seat of Qinglong County
- Qinglong, Jiangxi
- Qinglong, Shanghai, ancient port and modern Town
- Qinglong, Ziyang, in Jianyang, Sichuan
- Qinglong, Pengshan County, Sichuan
- Qinglong, Jianshui County, Yunnan
- Qinglong, Huaning County, Yunnan

=== Townships ===
- Qinglong Township, Anhui (青龙乡, Qīnglóng Xiāng)
- Qinglong Township, Chongqing
- Qinglong Township, Guangxi
- Qinglong Township, Qu County, Sichuan
- Qinglong Township, Xichong County, Sichuan
- Qinglong Township, Yingjing County, Sichuan
- Qinglong Township, Tibet

=== Rivers ===
- Qinglong River (Hebei) (青龙河, Qīnglóng Hé)
- Qinglong River (Heilongjiang)
- Qinglong River (Shandong)

== Historical eras ==
- Qinglong (233–237), era name used by Cao Rui, emperor of Cao Wei
- Qinglong (350), era name used by Shi Jian, emperor of Later Zhao
- Qinglong (398), era name used by Lan Han

== See also ==
- Qinglong Temple (disambiguation)
