= Rina Nabeshima =

Japanese long-distance runner

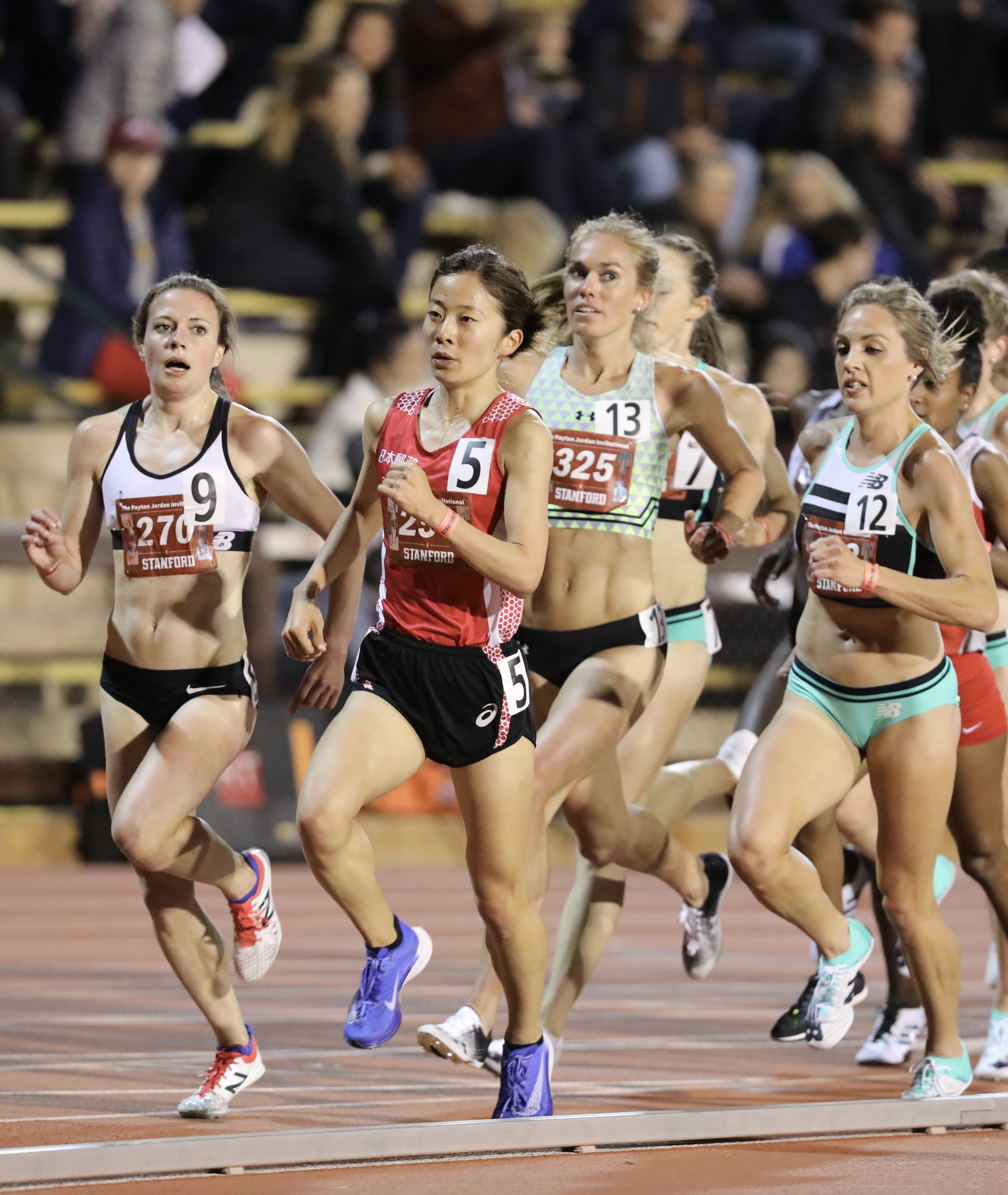
- Rina Nabeshima (second from left) in 2019

Personal information
- Native name: 鍋島 莉奈
- Nationality: Japanese
- Born: 16 December 1993 (age 32)
- Height: 160 cm (5 ft 3 in)
- Weight: 46 kg (101 lb)

Sport
- Country: Japan
- Sport: Track and field
- Event: 5000 metres
- Club: Japan Post

Achievements and titles
- Personal bests: 1500 m: 4:17:97 (2018); 3000 m: 8:04:21 (2018); 5000 m: 15:10:91 (2018); 10,000 m: 31:28:91 (2018)

Rina Nabeshima (鍋島 莉奈, Nabeshima Rina; born 16 December 1993) is a Japanese long-distance runner. She competed in the women's 5000 metres at the 2017 World Championships in Athletics.
