= Hirooki Arai =

Japanese racewalker (born 1988)

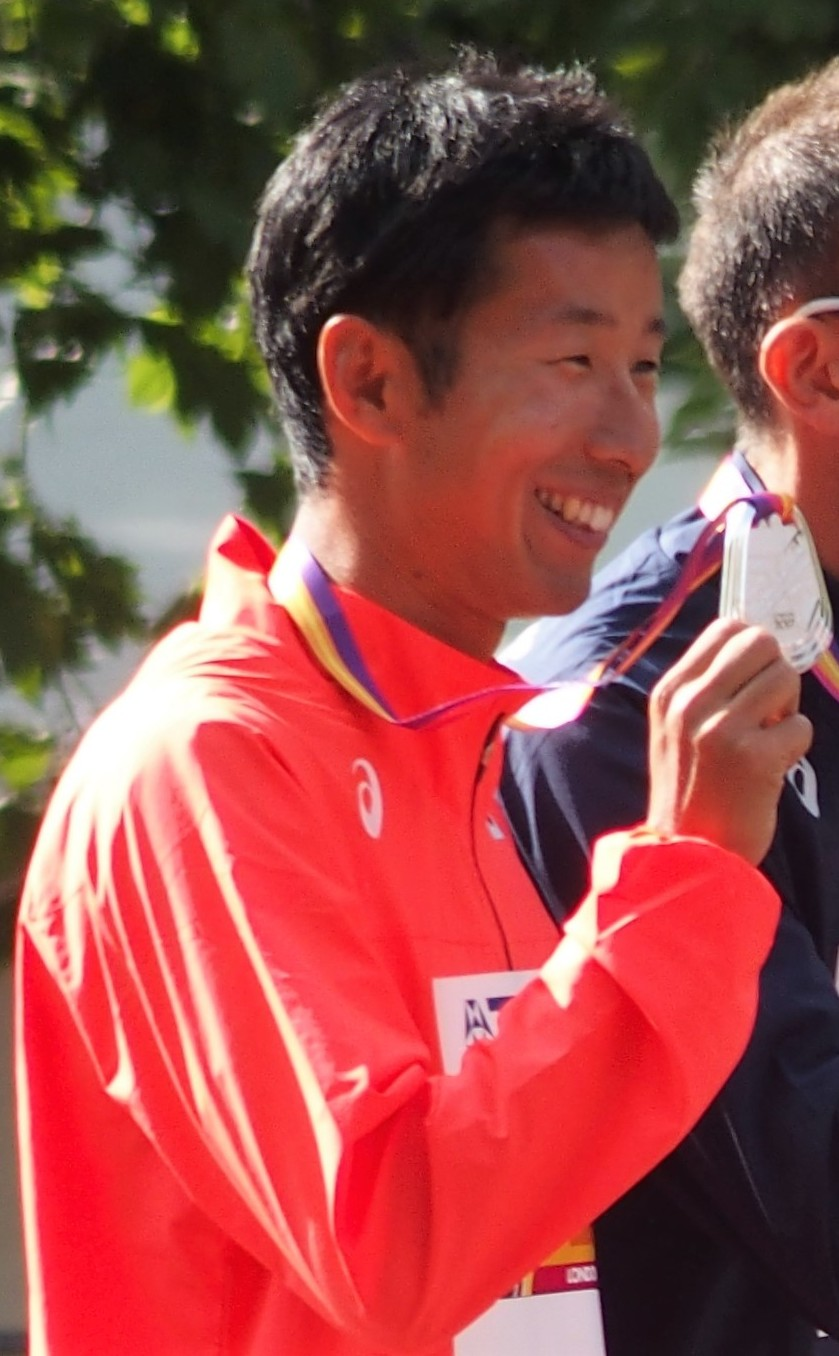

Personal information
- Born: 18 May 1988 (age 38) Nagano Prefecture, Japan
- Height: 180 cm (5 ft 11 in)
- Weight: 62 kg (137 lb)

Sport
- Country: Japan
- Sport: Track and field
- Event: Racewalking
Medal record
Olympic Games
Bronze medal – third place	2016 Rio de Janeiro	50 km walk
World Championships
Silver medal – second place	2017 London	50 km walk
World Race Walking Cup
Gold medal – first place	2018 Taicang	50 km walk

Hirooki Arai (荒井 広宙, Arai Hirooki; born 18 May 1988) is a male Japanese racewalker. He competed in the 50 kilometres walk event at the 2015 World Championships in Athletics in Beijing, China.

He finished third in the 50-kilometre race walk event at the 2016 Rio Olympics, but was subsequently disqualified following his collision in the final kilometres with Evan Dunfee of Canada, who then moved up from fourth place to claim the bronze medal. He had it given back to him after a few minutes when a Japanese appeal overturned the disqualification.

== See also ==
- Japan at the 2015 World Championships in Athletics
