= Lee Myong-seung =

South Korean marathon runner

Personal information
- Nationality: South Korea
- Born: 14 August 1979 (age 47) Seoul, South Korea
- Height: 1.77 m (5 ft 9 1/2 in)
- Weight: 61 kg (134 lb)

Korean name
- Hangul: 이명승
- RR: I Myeongseung
- MR: I Myŏngsŭng

Sport
- Sport: Athletics
- Event: Marathon
- Club: Samsung Electronics Athletic; Club
- Coached by: Lee Ui-Su

Achievements and titles
- Personal best: Marathon: 2:13:25 (2010)

Lee Myong-seung (Korean: 이명승; born August 14, 1979, in Seoul) is a South Korean marathon runner. He set a personal best time of 2:13:25, by finishing ninth at the 2010 Seoul International Marathon. In the same year, he achieved his best career result with a fourth-place finish at the Gyeongju International Marathon, clocking at 2:16:19.

Lee made his official debut for the 2004 Summer Olympics in Athens, where he placed forty-first out of a hundred runners in the marathon, with a time of 2:21:01.

At the 2008 Summer Olympics in Beijing, Lee qualified for the second time in the men's marathon, along with his teammates Kim Yi-Yong and Lee Bong-Ju. He successfully finished the race in eighteenth place by seven seconds ahead of Finland's Janne Holmen, posting his best Olympic career time of 2:14:37.
