= Choi Kyung-sun =

South Korean long-distance runner

Personal information
- Native name: 최경선
- Born: 16 March 1992 (age 34)
- Education: Gyeongbuk Physical Education High School

Sport
- Country: South Korea
- Sport: Long-distance running
Medal record
Asian Games
Bronze medal – third place	2018 Jakarta	Marathon

Choi Kyung-sun (Korean: 최경선, born 16 March 1992) is a South Korean long-distance runner.

In 2017, she competed in the women's marathon at the 2017 World Championships in Athletics held in London, United Kingdom. The following year, she finished in 4th place in the women's marathon at the 2018 Asian Games held in Jakarta, Indonesia.
