= Lim Kyung-hee =

South Korean long-distance runner

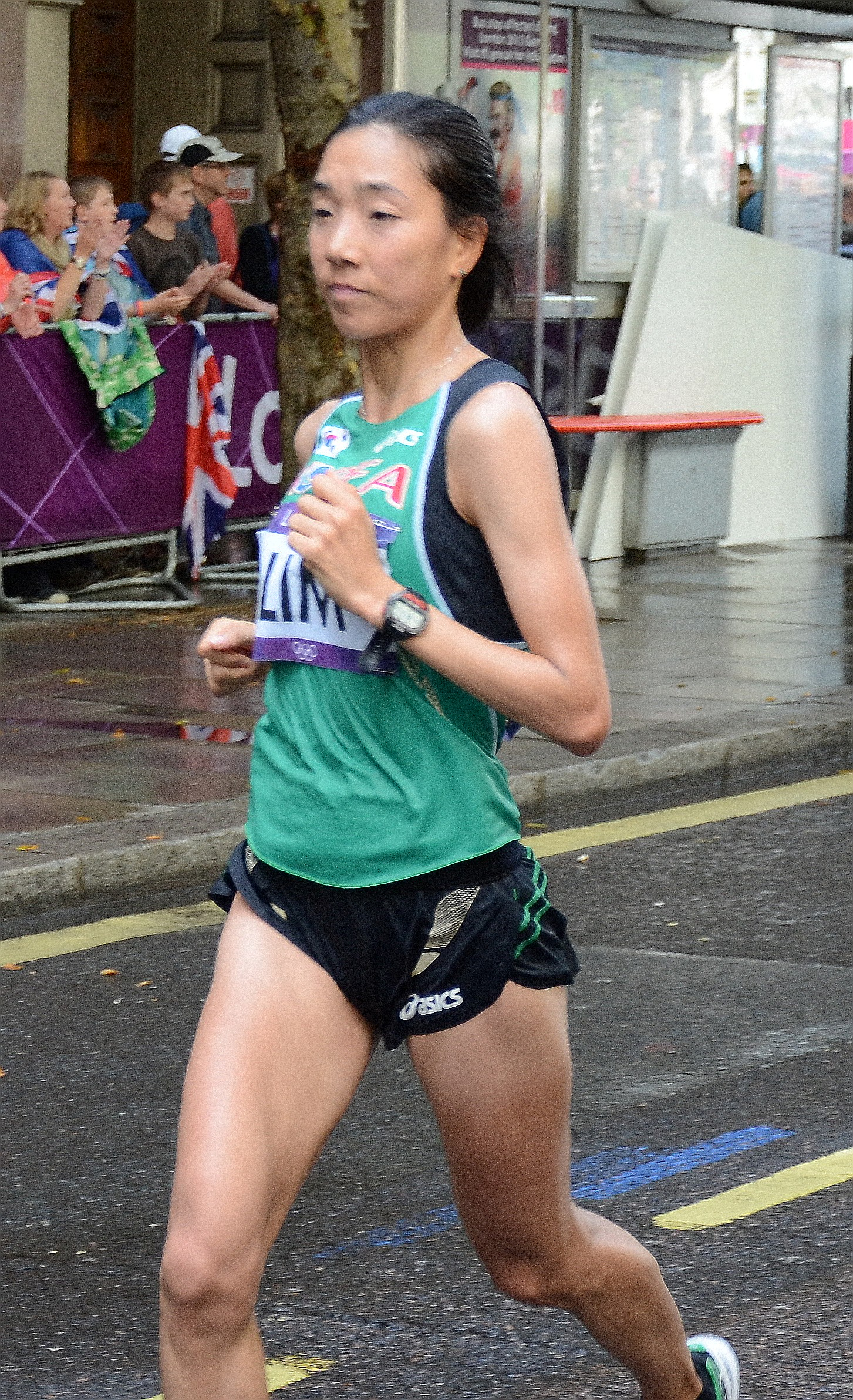
- Lim Kyung-Hee in the 2012 Summer Olympics marathon

Personal information
- Born: November 16, 1982 (age 43)
- Height: 1.65 m (5 ft 5 in)
- Weight: 45 kg (99 lb)

Korean name
- Hangul: 임경희
- RR: Im Gyeonghui
- MR: Im Kyŏnghŭi
- IPA: [im.ɡjʌŋ.ɦi] or [im] [kjʌŋ.ɦi]

Sport
- Country: South Korea
- Sport: Athletics
- Event: Marathon

Lim Kyung-hee (Korean: 임경희; born 16 November 1982 in Gyeonggi Province) is a South Korean long-distance runner. She competed in the marathon at the 2012 Summer Olympics, placing 76th with a time of 2:39:03.

Lim has won three gold medals at the South Korean Athletics Championships; one in the 5000 metres at the 2008 event, and two in the 10,000 metres at the 2012 and 2022 events.
