= Lee Bong-ju =

South Korean marathon runner (born 1970)

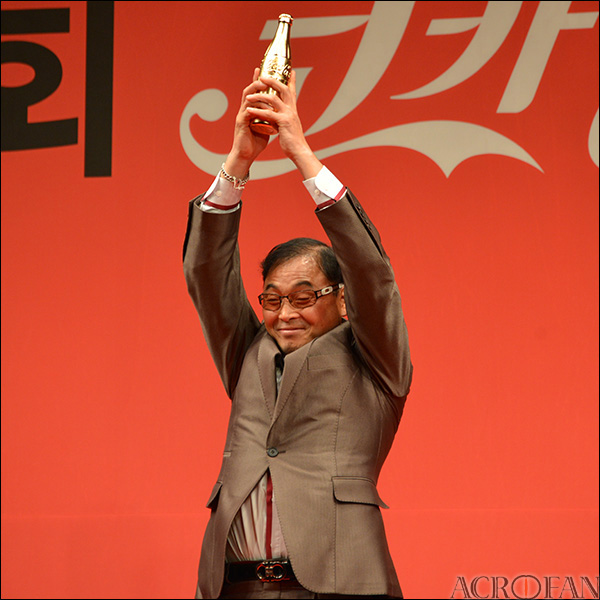

Personal information
- Born: November 8, 1970 (age 55)
Medal record
Men's Athletics
Representing South Korea
Olympic Games
Silver medal – second place	1996 Atlanta	Marathon
World Marathon Majors
Gold medal – first place	2001 Boston	Marathon
Asian Games
Gold medal – first place	1998 Bangkok	Marathon
Gold medal – first place	2002 Busan	Marathon

- Lee Bong-ju
- Hangul: 이봉주
- Hanja: 李鳳柱
- RR: I Bongju
- MR: I Pongju

Lee Bong-Ju (Korean: 이봉주; Hanja: 李鳳柱; born November 8, 1970, in Cheonan, Chungcheongnam-do, South Korea) is a South Korean marathoner.

He graduated from University of Seoul then competed for South Korea in the 1996 Summer Olympics held in Atlanta, United States in the Marathon where he won the silver medal.

He set the current South Korean men's national marathon record at 2:07:20 in Tokyo on February 13, 2000, and half marathon at 1:01:04 in Tokyo on January 26, 1992. He finished 41 marathons for his 19 years career with twice national records.

He retired following his victory at the Korean National Sports Festival in October 2009.

== Achievements ==
- All results regarding marathon, unless stated otherwise

Year	Competition	Venue	Position	Event	Notes
Representing South Korea
1990	Korean National Sports Festival Marathon	Seoul, South Korea	2nd	Marathon	2:19:15
1991	Korean National Sports Festival Marathon	Seoul, South Korea	1st	Marathon	2:14:30
1992	Tokyo International Half Marathon	Tokyo, Japan	4th	Half marathon	1:01:04
1993	Seoul half marathon	Seoul, South Korea	1st	Half marathon	1:05:48
1993	Korean National Sports Festival marathon	Seoul, South Korea	1st	Marathon	2:10:27
1993	Honolulu International Marathon	Honolulu, HI	1st	Marathon	2:13:16
1995	Donga International Marathon	Seoul, South Korea	1st	Marathon	2:09:59
1995	World Championships	Gothenburg, Sweden	22nd	Marathon	2:20:31
1996	Donga International Marathon	Silver, South Korea	2nd	Marathon	2:08:26
1996	Olympic Games	Atlanta, USA	2nd	Marathon	2:12:39
1996	Fukuoka Marathon	Fukuoka, Japan	1st	Marathon	2:10:48
1998	Rotterdam Marathon	Rotterdam, Netherlands	2nd	Marathon	2:07:44
1998	Asian Games	Bangkok, Thailand	1st	Marathon	2:12:32
2000	Tokyo International Marathon	Tokyo, Japan	2nd	Marathon	2:07:20
2000	Olympic Games	Sydney, Australia	24th	Marathon	2:17:57
2000	Fukuoka Marathon	Fukuoka, Japan	2nd	Marathon	2:09:04
2001	Milano Marathon	Milan, Italy	4th	Marathon	2:09:11
2001	Boston Marathon	Boston, Massachusetts	1st	Marathon	2:09:43
2001	World Championships	Edmonton, Canada		Marathon	DNF
2002	Boston Marathon	Boston, Massachusetts	5th	Marathon	2:10:30
2002	Asian Games	Busan, South Korea	1st	Marathon	2:14:04
2003	World Championships	Paris, France	11th	Marathon	2:10:38
2004	Seoul International Marathon	Seoul, South Korea	5th	Marathon	2:08:15
2004	Olympic Games	Athens, Greece	14th	Marathon	2:15:33
2005	Berlin Marathon	Berlin, Germany	11th	Marathon	2:12:19
2007	Seoul International Marathon	Seoul, South Korea	1st	Marathon	2:08:04
2007	Chicago Marathon	Chicago, USA	7th	Marathon	2:17:29
2008	Olympic Games	Beijing, China	28th	Marathon	2:17:59
2009	Korean National Sports Festival Marathon	Seoul, South Korea	1st	Marathon	2:15:25
