= Luvsanlkhündegiin Otgonbayar =

Mongolian long-distance runner

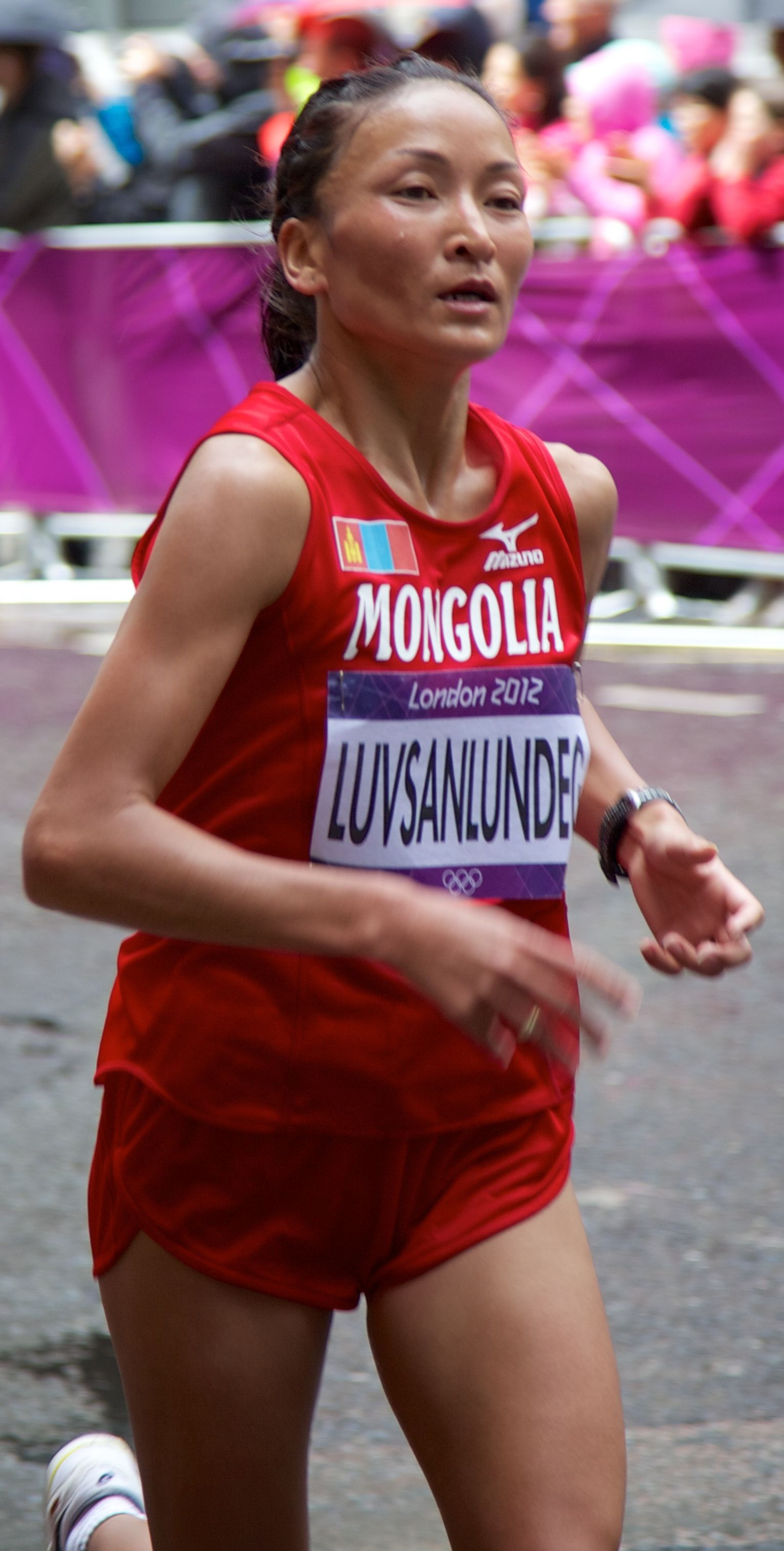

Personal information
- Born: July 13, 1982 (age 44) Ulaanbaatar, Mongolia
- Height: 1.52 m (5 ft 0 in)
- Weight: 44 kg (97 lb)

Sport
- Country: Mongolia
- Sport: Athletics
- Event: Marathon

Luvsanlkhündegiin Otgonbayar, (Mongolian: Лувсанлхүндэгийн Отгонбаяр; born July 13, 1982) is a Mongolian athlete. She has represented her country by running the marathon at competitions such as the 2004 Summer Olympics, the 2006 Asian Games, the 2007 World Championships and the 2012 Summer Olympics.

== Career ==
Born in Ulaanbaatar, she achieved a degree of fame during the 2004 Olympics by completing the marathon, with a time 3:48:42, despite having dropped half an hour or more behind all the other competitors. Time magazine reported:

By 10 p.m. the race wasn't a race at all, just a solitary Mongolian inching along the track. Otgonbayar, the 22-year-old daughter of camel and sheep herders, didn't so much run into the historic stadium as microshuffle in, with a gait so unhurried that the thousands of cheering spectators could be forgiven for thinking the world had paused or, at the very least, shifted into super slo-mo. […] Motion doesn't get any more triumphal than the descendants of Genghis Khan racing through the grasslands, in pursuit of the true Olympic spirit.

Similarly to Time, the BBC celebrated Otgonbayar as one of the "unsung heroes" of the Olympics. The Marquette Tribune reported that the "Mongolian Luvsanlkhundeg Otgonbayar limped across the finish line 30 minutes after the second slowest runner" while "the remaining crowd clapped in unison as she approached the final 100 meters on her way to finishing the race." The newspaper suggested that she had thus "followed in the footsteps of Pheidippides", running the marathon with notable "courage".

Describing her performance, Otgonbayar said:

"The sound of all the clapping from the fans pushed me forward, and I felt like I was running very fast. Even if I finished last, it was all right, because I still finished and many people, even famous people, didn't do that."

In 2015, she finished 11th at the Hamburg Marathon with a personal best of 2:38.

== Achievements ==
Year	Competition	Venue	Position	Event	Notes
Representing Mongolia
2004	Olympic Games	Athens, Greece	66th	Marathon	3:48:42
2006	Asian Games	Doha, Qatar	8th	Marathon	2:59:55
2007	World Championships	Osaka, Japan	52nd	Marathon	3:04:59
2009	World Championships	Berlin, Germany	–	Marathon	DNF
2010	Asian Games	Guangzhou, China	12th	5000 m	17:00.32
2011	World Championships	Daegu, South Korea	39th	Marathon	2:45:58
2012	Olympic Games	London, United Kingdom	102nd	Marathon	2:52:15
2015	World Championships	Beijing, China	—	Marathon	DNF

== See also ==
- Pyambuugiin Tuul, another Mongolian athlete who completed an Olympic marathon but finished last
- Abdul Baser Wasiqi, Afghan Olympic marathoner in 1996, who finished last and constituted his country's entire Olympic team
