= Kim Yi-yong =

South Korean runner (born 1973)

Personal information
- Born: 20 September 1973 (age 53) Gangwon-do, South Korea

Sport
- Sport: Marathon running
Medal record
Representing South Korea
Summer Universiade
Bronze medal – third place	1995 Fukuoka	Marathon

- Kim Yi-yong
- Hangul: 김이용
- RR: Gim Iyong
- MR: Kim Iyong

Kim Yi-Yong (Korean: 김이용; born 20 September 1973) is a retired South Korean long-distance runner who specialized in the marathon. He was the 2004 Asian Marathon Championship winner.

His personal best for the marathon is 2:07:49 hours, set in 1999.

== International competitions ==
Year	Competition	Venue	Position	Event	Notes
Representing South Korea
1996	Olympic Games	Atlanta, United States	12th	Marathon	2:16:17
2001	World Championships	Edmonton, Canada	54th	Marathon	2:33:28
2003	World Championships	Paris, France	—	Marathon	DNF
2004	Asian Marathon Championships	Seoul, South Korea	1st	Marathon	
2006	Asian Games	Doha, Qatar	14th	Marathon	2:27:11
2008	Olympic Games	Beijing, China	50th	Marathon	2:23:58
