= Choe Byeong-kwang =

South Korean racewalker

Personal information
- Born: 7 April 1991 (age 35)
- Education: University of Suwon
- Height: 1.85 m (6 ft 1 in)
- Weight: 72 kg (159 lb)

Sport
- Country: South Korea
- Sport: Athletics
- Event: Racewalking
Medal record
Men's athletics
Representing South Korea
Asian Games
Bronze medal – third place	2026 Aichi-Nagoya	half marathon walk

Korean name
- Hangul: 최병광
- RR: Choe Byeonggwang
- MR: Ch'oe Pyŏnggwang
- Updated on 2 September 2015

Choe Byeong-kwang (Korean: 최병광; Korean pronunciation: [tɕʰwe̞.bjʌŋ.ɡwaŋ] or [tɕʰwe̞] [pjʌŋ.ɡwaŋ]; born 7 April 1991) is a South Korean racewalker. He competed in the 20 kilometres walk event at the 2015 World Championships in Athletics in Beijing, China. In 2019, he competed in the men's 20 kilometres walk at the 2019 World Athletics Championships held in Doha, Qatar. He finished in 21st place.

== See also ==
- South Korea at the 2015 World Championships in Athletics
