= Byun Young-joon =

South Korean racewalker

- Hangul: 변영준
- RR: Byeon Yeongjun
- MR: Pyŏn Yŏngjun

Byun Young-jun (Korean pronunciation: [pjʌ.njʌŋ.dʑun] or [pjʌn] [jʌŋ.dʑun]; born 20 March 1984 in Ulsan) is a South Korean racewalker. He competed in the 20 km walk at the 2012 Summer Olympics, where he placed 31st.
