= Kim Mi-jung (race walker) =

South Korean racewalker (born 1979)

Kim Mi-Jung
Personal information
- Nationality: South Korea
- Born: 10 June 1979 (age 47) Seoul, South Korea
- Height: 1.65 m (5 ft 5 in)
- Weight: 55 kg (121 lb)

Sport
- Sport: Athletics
- Event: Race walking
- Club: Ulsan SI Cheong
- Coached by: Lee Jeong-Gu

Achievements and titles
- Personal best: 20 km walk: 1:29:38 (2008)

Kim Mi-Jung (Korean: 김미정; RR: Gim Mijeong; born June 10, 1979) is a female South Korean race walker. She set both a national record and a personal best time of 1:29:38, by winning the women's 20 km at the 2008 National Sports Festival in Yeosu. Furthermore, Kim became the first female South Korean to cross the finish line under one hour and thirty minutes, and also, achieved a total of seven national records (2001–2008) and eight straight victories in the same event.

She was born in Seoul. Kim made her official debut for the 2000 Summer Olympics in Sydney, where she placed twenty-fifth in the women's 20 km race walk, and shattered her first career national record-breaking time of 1:36.09. She also competed at the 2004 Summer Olympics in Athens, but was disqualified from the same event, for not following the proper form during the race course.

Eight years after competing in her first Olympics, Kim qualified for her third South Korean team, as a 29-year-old, at the 2008 Summer Olympics in Beijing. She successfully finished the women's 20 km race walk in twenty-eighth place by eight seconds ahead of Kazakhstan's Svetlana Tolstaya, with a time of 1:33:55.
