= Tseveenravdangiin Byambajav =

Mongolian long-distance runner (born 1990)

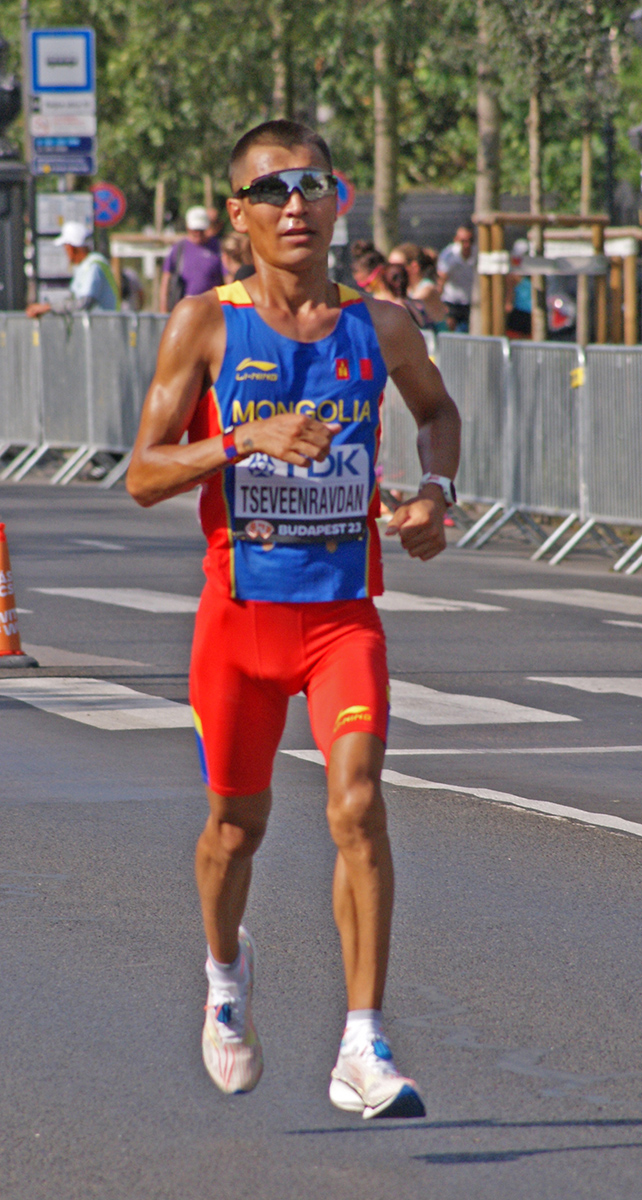

Personal information
- Nationality: Mongolian
- Born: 7 July 1990 (age 36)

Sport
- Sport: Track and field
- Event: Marathon
Medal record
Representing Mongolia
Men's Marathon
Asian Marathon Championships
Bronze medal – third place	2017 Dongguan	Marathon

Tseveenravdangiin Byambajav (Mongolian: Цэвээнравдангийн Бямбажав; born 7 July 1990) is a Mongolian long-distance runner who specialises in the marathon. He competed in the men's marathon event at the 2016 Summer Olympics. In 2017 Byambajav participated in the World Championships held in London, placing 46th in the marathon event, with a time of 2:21:48.

In 2019, Byambajav contested 10 marathons. On 5 October he represented his country at the 2019 World Championships in Athletics in Doha, Qatar where he finished 40th in 2:20:07. On 27 October he ran the marathon at the CISM Military World Games in Wuhan, China, where he placed 4th in 2:12:56. Bahrain's Shumi Dechasa won. In 2020, Byambajav ran the Beppu-Oita Mainichi Marathon, where he placed 5th in a personal best time of 2:09:03. This performance qualified him for the 2020 Tokyo Olympic Games men's marathon. On 8 March he placed 17th in 2:12:32 at The 76th Lake Biwa Mainichi Marathon.
