= Galbadrakhyn Khishigsaikhan =

Mongolian long-distance runner (born 1990)

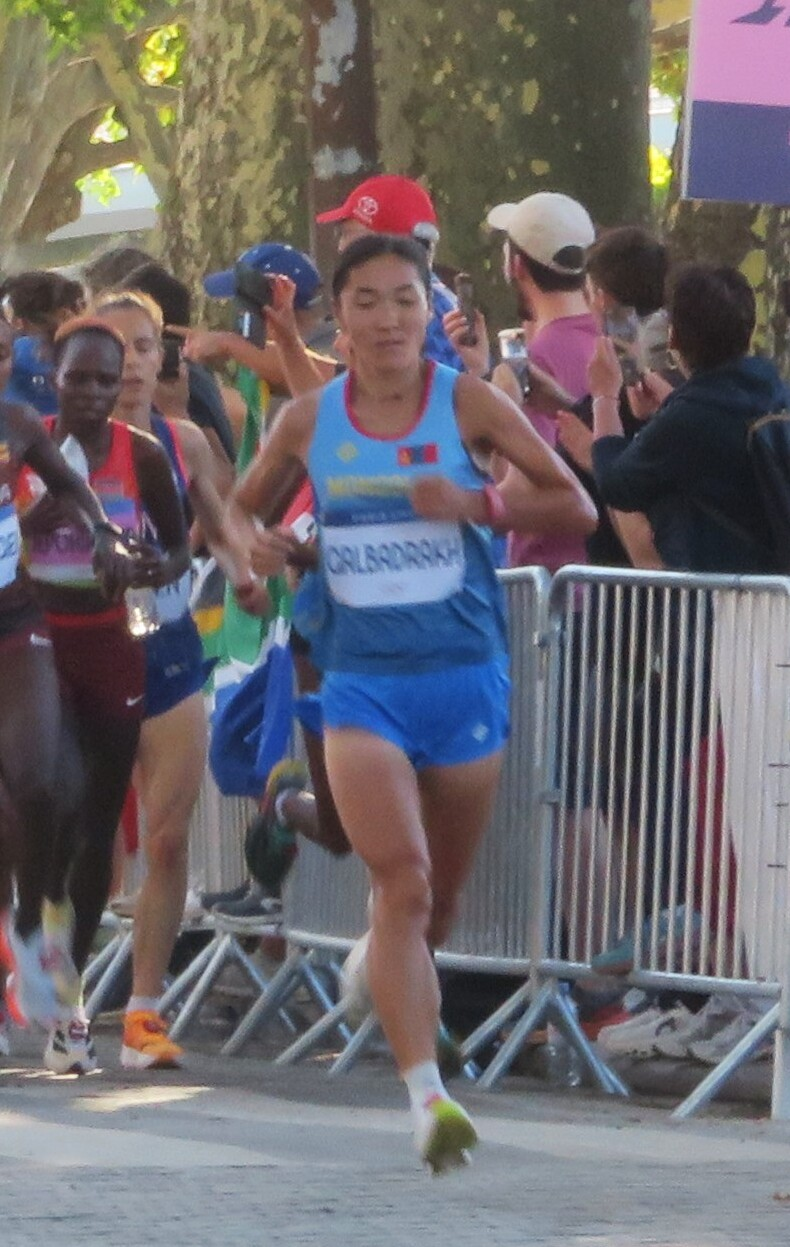
- 2024 Summer Olympics

Personal information
- Nationality: Mongolian
- Born: 28 August 1990 (age 35)

Sport
- Sport: Long-distance running
- Event: Marathon

Galbadrakhyn Khishigsaikhan (Mongolian: Галбадрахын Хишигсайхан; born 28 August 1990) is a Mongolian long-distance runner. She competed in the women's marathon at the 2017 World Championships in Athletics. In 2019, she competed in the women's marathon at the 2019 World Athletics Championships held in Doha, Qatar, where she finished in 25th place. She placed 8th in the women's race in the 2024 Tokyo Marathon.
