= Bayartsogtyn Mönkhzayaa =

Mongolian long-distance runner (born 1993)

Munkhzaya Bayartsogt
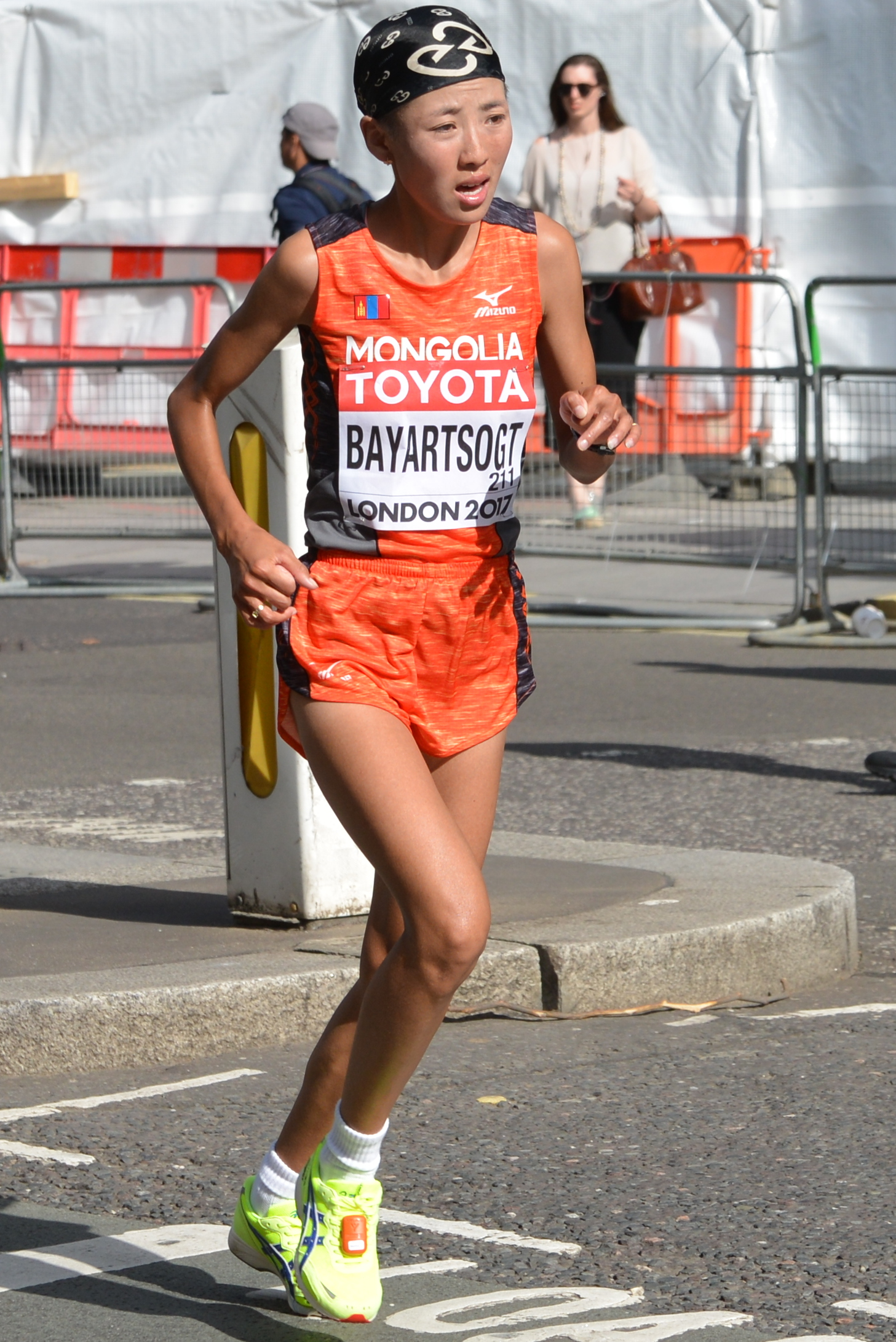
- Bayartsogt at 2017 World Championships in Athletics

Personal information
- Nationality: Mongolian
- Born: 10 October 1993 (age 32)
- Height: 160 cm (5 ft 3 in)
- Weight: 43 kg (95 lb)

Sport
- Country: Mongolia
- Sport: Track and field
- Event: Marathon

Achievements and titles
- Personal best: 2:30:54 (2017)

Bayartsogtyn Mönkhzayaa (Mongolian: Баярцогтын Мөнхзаяа; born 10 October 1993) is a Mongolian long-distance runner. She competed in the marathon event at the 2015 World Championships in Athletics in Beijing, China. In 2019, she competed in the women's marathon at the 2019 World Athletics Championships held in Doha, Qatar. She finished in 34th place.

At the 2020 Summer Olympics in Tokyo, Mönkhzayaa ran a season's best 2:37:08 in the women's marathon, finishing in 45th place.
