= 2005 in race walking =

This page lists the World Best Year Performance in the year 2005 in both the men's and the women's race walking distances: 20 km and 50 km (outdoor). One of the main events during this season were the 2005 World Championships in Helsinki, Finland.

== Abbreviations ==
- All times shown are in hours:minutes:seconds

WR	world record
AR	area record
CR	event record
NR	national record
PB	personal best

== Men's 20 km ==
=== Records ===
Standing records prior to the 2005 season in track and field
World Record	Jefferson Pérez (ECU)	1:17:21	23 August 2003	Paris, France

=== 2005 World Year ranking ===
Rank	Time	Athlete	Venue	Date	Note
1	1:17:33	Nathan Deakes (AUS)	Cixi, PR China	23 April 2005	
2	1:17:41	Zhu Hongjun (CHN)	Cixi, PR China	23 April 2005	
3	1:17:52	Paquillo Fernández (ESP)	A Coruña, Spain	4 June 2005	
4	1:17:53	Cui Zhide (CHN)	Cixi, PR China	23 April 2005	
5	1:18:06	Vladimir Parvatkin (RUS)	Adler, Russia	12 March 2005	
6	1:18:07	Li Gaobo (CHN)	Cixi, PR China	23 April 2005	
7	1:18:17	Ilya Markov (RUS)	Adler, Russia	12 March 2005	
8	1:18:22	Li Gaobo (CHN)	Nanjing, PR China	19 October 2005	
9	1:18:27	Xing Shucai (CHN)	Cixi, PR China	23 April 2005	
10	1:18:30	Yu Chaohong (CHN)	Cixi, PR China	23 April 2005	
11	1:18:31	Han Yucheng (CHN)	Cixi, PR China	23 April 2005	
12	1:18:33	Liu Yunfeng (CHN)	Cixi, PR China	23 April 2005	
13	1:18:35	Jefferson Pérez (ECU)	Helsinki, Finland	6 August 2005	
14	1:18:39	Lu Ronghua (CHN)	Cixi, PR China	23 April 2005	
15	1:18:45	Stepan Yudin (RUS)	Adler, Russia	12 March 2005	
16	1:18:48	Viktor Burayev (RUS)	Adler, Russia	12 March 2005	
17	1:18:51	Noé Hernández (MEX)	Cixi, PR China	23 April 2005	
18	1:19:02	Eder Sánchez (MEX)	Cixi, PR China	23 April 2005	
19	1:19:08	Fang Pengfei (CHN)	Cixi, PR China	23 April 2005	
20	1:19:19	Luke Adams (AUS)	Cixi, PR China	23 April 2005	
21	1:19:21	Pei Chuang (CHN)	Nanning, PR China	25 February 2005	
21	1:19:21	Rolando Saquipay (ECU)	Lima, Peru	7 May 2005	
23	1:19:22	Cristian Berdeja (MEX)	Cixi, PR China	23 April 2005	
24	1:19:29	Bai Xuejin (CHN)	Cixi, PR China	23 April 2005	
25	1:19:34	Li Jianbo (CHN)	Cixi, PR China	23 April 2005	

== Men's 50 km ==
=== Records ===
Standing records prior to the 2005 season in track and field
World Record	Denis Nizhegorodov (RUS)	3:35:29	13 June 2004	Cheboksary, Russia

=== 2005 World Year ranking ===
Rank	Time	Athlete	Venue	Date	Note
1	3:36:06	Yu Chaohong (CHN)	Nanjing, PR China	22 October 2005	
2	3:36:13	Zhao Chengliang (CHN)	Nanjing, PR China	22 October 2005	
3	3:36:20	Han Yucheng (CHN)	Nanjing, PR China	27 February 2005	
4	3:37:58	Xing Shucai (CHN)	Nanjing, PR China	27 February 2005	
5	3:39:17	Dong Jimin (CHN)	Nanjing, PR China	27 February 2005	
6	3:40:23	Alatan Gadasu (CHN)	Nanjing, PR China	22 October 2005	
7	3:40:40	Vladimir Kanaykin (RUS)	Saransk, Russia	12 June 2005	
8	3:41:03	Aleksey Voyevodin (RUS)	Miskolc, Hungary	21 May 2005	
9	3:41:30	Ni Liang (CHN)	Nanjing, PR China	22 October 2005	
10	3:41:47	Mikel Odriozola (ESP)	El Prat de Llobregat, Spain	27 February 2005	
11	3:41:54	Alex Schwazer (ITA)	Helsinki, Finland	12 August 2005	
12	3:42:34	Yuriy Andronov (RUS)	Miskolc, Hungary	21 May 2005	
13	3:42:55	Si Tianfeng (CHN)	Nanjing, PR China	22 October 2005	
14	3:44:04	Trond Nymark (NOR)	Helsinki, Finland	12 August 2005	
15	3:44:20	Cui Zhide (CHN)	Nanning, PR China	27 February 2005	
16	3:45:05	Lu Ronghua (CHN)	Nanning, PR China	27 February 2005	
17	3:45:13	Li Jianbo (CHN)	Nanning, PR China	27 February 2005	
18	3:45:17	Yohann Diniz (FRA)	Miskolc, Hungary	21 May 2005	
19	3:45:23	Wang Zhiping (CHN)	Nanning, PR China	27 February 2005	
20	3:46:44	Yang Yongjian (CHN)	Nanning, PR China	27 February 2005	
21	3:47:02	Zhao Jianguo (CHN)	Nanjing, PR China	22 October 2005	
22	3:47:19	Chang Chunhu (CHN)	Nanning, PR China	27 February 2005	
23	3:47:31	Denis Langlois (FRA)	Miskolc, Hungary	21 May 2005	
24	3:47:51	Nathan Deakes (AUS)	Melbourne, Australia	1 May 2005	
25	3:48:15	Santiago Pérez (ESP)	El Prat de Llobregat, Spain	27 February 2005	

== Women's 10 km ==
=== Records ===
Standing records prior to the 2005 season in track and field
World Record	Yelena Nikolayeva (RUS)	41:04	20 April 1996	Sochi, Russia

=== 2005 World Year ranking ===
Rank	Time	Athlete	Venue	Date	Note
1	42:27	Ryta Turava (BLR)	Kraków, Poland	17 September 2005	
2	42:53	Elena Ginko (BLR)	Kraków, Poland	17 September 2005	
3	43:17	Sabine Krantz (GER)	Naumburg, Germany	11 June 2005	
4	43:26	Elisa Rigaudo (ITA)	Lloret de Mar, Spain	10 April 2005	
5	43:42	Lyudmila Yefimkina (RUS)	Kraków, Poland	17 September 2005	
6	43:51	Rossella Giordano (ITA)	Lloret de Mar, Spain	10 April 2005	
7	43:59	María Vasco (ESP)	Lloret de Mar, Spain	10 April 2005	
8	44:09	Vera Sokolova (RUS)	Miskolc, Hungary	21 May 2005	
9	44:19	Ana Maria Groza (ROM)	Alba Iulia, Romania	4 September 2005	
10	44:29	Veronica Budileanu (ROM)	Alba Iulia, Romania	4 September 2005	
11	44:31	Melanie Seeger (GER)	Helsinki, Finland	7 August 2005	
12	44:36	Tatyana Kalmykova (RUS)	Sochi, Russia	13 March 2005	
13	44:41	Zuzana Malíková (SVK)	Kraków, Poland	17 September 2005	
14	44:49	Jolanta Dukure (LAT)	Valmiera, Latvia	2 July 2005	
15	44:52	Song Hongjuan (CHN)	Rio Maior, Portugal	2 April 2005	
16	44:58	Irina Pudovkina (RUS)	Chelyabinsk, Russia	6 September 2005	
17	44:59	Jane Saville (AUS)	Lloret de Mar, Spain	10 April 2005	
18	45:01	Elena Ladanova (RUS)	Saransk, Russia	11 June 2005	
19	45:02	Norica Câmpean (ROM)	Alba Iulia, Romania	4 September 2005	
20	45:07	Mayumi Kawasaki (JPN)	Kobe, Japan	30 January 2005	
21	45:17	Mária Gáliková (SVK)	Borský Mikuláš, Slovakia	11 June 2005	
21	45:17	Larisa Emelyanova (RUS)	Chelyabinsk, Russia	6 September 2005	
23	45:19	Rocío Florido (ESP)	Almería, Spain	13 February 2005	
23	45:19	Beatriz Pascual (ESP)	Santa Eularia, Spain	19 March 2005	
25	45:20	Ekaterina Ezhova (RUS)	Chelyabinsk, Russia	6 September 2005	

== Women's 20 km ==
=== Records ===
Standing records prior to the 2005 season in track and field
World Record	Olimpiada Ivanova (RUS)	1:24:50	4 March 2001	Adler, Russia

=== 2005 World Year ranking ===
Rank	Time	Athlete	Venue	Date	Note
1	1:25:41	Olimpiada Ivanova (RUS)	Helsinki, Finland	7 August 2005	
2	1:26:28	Irina Pudovkina (RUS)	Adler, Russia	12 March 2005	
3	1:27:05	Ryta Turava (BLR)	Helsinki, Finland	7 August 2005	
4	1:27:19	Jiang Jing (CHN)	Nanning, PR China	25 February 2005	
5	1:27:24	Wang Liping (CHN)	Nanning, PR China	25 February 2005	
6	1:27:37	Bai Yanmin (CHN)	Nanjing, PR China	20 October 2005	
7	1:27:56	Irina Stankina (RUS)	Adler, Russia	12 March 2005	
8	1:27:58	Yang Yawei (CHN)	Cixi, PR China	23 April 2005	
9	1:28:01	Jiang Qiuyan (CHN)	Cixi, PR China	23 April 2005	
10	1:28:07	Tang Yinghua (CHN)	Cixi, PR China	23 April 2005	
11	1:28:11	Elena Ginko (BLR)	Adler, Russia	12 March 2005	
12	1:28:22	Shi Na (CHN)	Cixi, PR China	23 April 2005	
13	1:28:26	Song Hongjuan (CHN)	Nanning, PR China	25 February 2005	
14	1:28:35	He Dan (CHN)	Cixi, PR China	23 April 2005	
15	1:28:44	Susana Feitor (POR)	Helsinki, Finland	7 August 2005	
16	1:28:51	Gao Kelian (CHN)	Cixi, PR China	23 April 2005	
17	1:28:51	María Vasco (ESP)	Helsinki, Finland	7 August 2005	
18	1:28:52	Lyudmila Arkhipova (RUS)	Adler, Russia	12 March 2005	
19	1:29:02	Tatyana Gudkova (RUS)	Saransk, Russia	11 June 2005	
20	1:29:05	Barbora Dibelková (CZE)	Helsinki, Finland	7 August 2005	
21	1:29:07	Sabine Krantz (GER)	Dresden, Germany	24 April 2005	
22	1:29:21	Athina Papayianni (GRE)	Helsinki, Finland	7 August 2005	
23	1:29:25	Olga Kaniskina (RUS)	Saransk, Russia	11 June 2005	
24	1:29:26	Elisa Rigaudo (ITA)	Miskolc, Hungary	21 May 2005	
25	1:29:33	Jane Saville (AUS)	Cixi, PR China	23 April 2005	
