= Asian Race Walking Championships =

Annual race walking competition for athletes

Asian 20km Race Walking Championships
- Most recent season or competition: 2023
- Sport: Race walking
- Founded: 2006
- Continent: Asia (AAA)
- Most recent champions: India (Men's); China (Women's)

The Asian Race Walking Championships is an annual race walking competition for athletes representing countries from Asia, organized by the Asian Athletics Association (AAA). It was established in 2006 and has featured races for senior men (20 km and 50 km) and women (20 km). After the inaugural event 2006 in Wajima, Japan, the competition was split into two events: the 20 km (both men and women) were incorporated into the All-Japan Race Walking competitions held in mid March in Nomi, Japan. The 50 km event was held about a month later in mid April in Wajima, Japan. This is established until the year 2008. There are still annual national 50 km championships held in Wajima, but the further fate of the 50 km event within the Asian Race Walking Championships remains unknown.

== Editions ==
Edition	Year	City	Country	Date
1	2006	Wajima, Ishikawa	Japan	April 16
2	2007	Nomi (Neagari), Ishikawa (20 km)	Japan	March 25
2	2007	Wajima, Ishikawa (50 km)	Japan	April 15
3	2008	Nomi, Ishikawa (20 km)	Japan	March 16
3	2008	Wajima, Ishikawa (50 km)	Japan	April 13
4	2009	Nomi, Ishikawa (20 km)	Japan	March 15
5	2010	Nomi, Ishikawa (20 km)	Japan	March 14
6	2011	Nomi, Ishikawa (20 km)	Japan	March 13
7	2012	Nomi, Ishikawa (20 km)	Japan	March 11
8	2013	Nomi, Ishikawa (20 km)	Japan	March 10
9	2014	Nomi, Ishikawa (20 km)	Japan	March 16
10	2015	Nomi, Ishikawa (20 km)	Japan	March 15
11	2016	Nomi, Ishikawa (20 km)	Japan	March 20
12	2017	Nomi, Ishikawa (20 km)	Japan	March 19
13	2018	Nomi, Ishikawa (20 km)	Japan	March 18
14	2019	Nomi, Ishikawa (20 km)	Japan	March 17
15	2023	Nomi, Ishikawa (20 km)	Japan	March 20
16	2025	Nomi, Ishikawa (20 km)	Japan	March 16

== Results ==
Results were compiled from the Athletics Weekly, the Asian Athletics Association, the IAAF, the Fédération Suisse de Marche and the Tilastopaja webpages.

=== Men's results ===
==== 20 kilometres ====
Year	Gold		Silver		Bronze	
2006	Xu Xingde (CHN)	1:22:17	Kōichirō Morioka (JPN)	1:24:44	Rustam Kuvatov (KAZ)	1:25:08
2007	Takayuki Tanii (JPN)	1:21:09	Kōichirō Morioka (JPN)	1:21:30	Akihiro Sugimoto (JPN)	1:23:17
2008	Kōichirō Morioka (JPN)	1:21:55	Ronglong Zhang (CHN)	1:23:32	Rustam Kuvatov (KAZ)	1:24:01
2009	Li Jianbo (CHN)	1:20:38	Yu Wei (CHN)	1:20:41	Park Chil-sung (KOR)	1:20:45
2010	Yusuke Suzuki (JPN)	1:20:06	Isamu Fujisawa (JPN)	1:20:12	Byun Young-jun (KOR)	1:22:07
2011	Kim Hyun-sub (KOR)	1:19:31	Wang Gang (CHN)	1:22:18	Yusuke Yachi (JPN)	1:22:27
2012	Zhu Chundong (CHN)	1:21:22	Gurmeet Singh (IND)	1:21:31	Byun Young-jun (KOR)	1:21:42
2013	Yusuke Suzuki (JPN)	1:18:34	Li Tianlei (CHN)	1:21:28	Gurmeet Singh (IND)	1:21:38
2014	Kim Hyun-sub (KOR)	1:19:24 NR	Yusuke Suzuki (JPN)	1:21:01	Gurmeet Singh (IND)	1:21:30
2015	Yusuke Suzuki (JPN)	1:16:36 WR	Isamu Fujisawa (JPN)	1:19:08	Daisuke Matsunaga (JPN)	1:19:08
2016	Gurmeet Singh (IND)	1:20:29	Isamu Fujisawa (JPN)	1:20:49	Georgiy Sheiko (KAZ)	1:21:52
2017	Kim Hyun-sub (KOR)	1:19:50	Georgiy Sheiko (KAZ)	1:20:47	Irfan Kolothum Thodi (IND)	1:20:59
2018	Daisuke Matsunaga (JPN)	1:20:55	Fumitaka Oikawa (JPN)	1:21:32	Kim Hyun-sub (KOR)	1:21:52
2019	Toshikazu Yamanishi (JPN)	1:17:15	Masatora Kawano (JPN)	1:17:24	Koki Ikeda (JPN)	1:17:25
2023	Akshdeep Singh (IND)	1:20:57	Choe Byeongkwang (KOR)	1:21:20	Wen Yongjie (CHN)	1:22:44
2024						
2025	Yuta Koga (JPN)	1:18:48	Hu Xuanfei (CHN)	1:21:12	Georgiy Sheiko (KAZ)	1:23:07

==== 50 kilometres ====
Year	Gold		Silver		Bronze	
2006	Zhao Jianguo (CHN)	3:41:10	Li Jianbo (CHN)	3:43:02	Yuki Yamazaki (JPN)	3:43:38
2007	Zhao Chengliang (CHN)	3:44:26	Yuki Yamazaki (JPN)	3:47:40	Li Jianbo (CHN)	3:53:24
2008	Yuki Yamazaki (JPN)	3:41:55	Takayuki Tanii (JPN)	3:49:33	Yusuke Yachi (JPN)	3:52:37

=== Women's results ===
==== 20 kilometres ====
Year	Gold		Silver		Bronze	
2006	Svetlana Tolstaya (KAZ)	1:30:22	Sha Yang (CHN)	1:31:09	Lihua Sun (CHN)	1:31:30
2007	Mayumi Kawasaki (JPN)	1:28:57 NR	Sachiko Konishi (JPN)	1:33:05	Kim Mi-jung (KOR)	1:34:54
2008	Mayumi Kawasaki (JPN)	1:31:	Sha Yang (CHN)	1:32:23	Masumi Fuchise (JPN)	1:32:37
2009	Masumi Fuchise (JPN)	1:30:49	Kumi Otoshi (JPN)	1:31:42	Yanfei Li (CHN)	1:32:16
2010	Masumi Fuchise (JPN)	1:29:35	Kumi Otoshi (JPN)	1:30:36	Chiaki Asada (JPN)	1:32:27
2011	Kumi Otoshi (JPN)	1:30:44	Masumi Fuchise (JPN)	1:31:52	Chiaki Asada (JPN)	1:34:01
2012	Huiqin Ding (CHN)	1:30:14	Rei Inoue (JPN)	1:34:06	Nguyễn Thị Thanh Phúc (VIE)	1:35:13
2013	Kumi Otoshi (JPN)	1:33:49	Nguyễn Thị Thanh Phúc (VIE)	1:35:26	Jeon Yeong-eun (KOR)	1:35:49
2014	Zhou Tongmei (CHN)	1:31:58	Rei Inoue (JPN)	1:32:56	Khushbir Kaur (IND)	1:33:37 NR
2015	Yongbo Hou (CHN)	1:29:25	Kumiko Okada (JPN)	1:29:46	Jeon Yeong-eun (KOR)	1:30:35
2016	Rui Liang (CHN)	1:28:43	Kumiko Okada (JPN)	1:30:03	Lee Jeong-eun (KOR)	1:33:57
2017	Wang Na (CHN)	1:30:51	Kumiko Okada (JPN)	1:33:21	Yeongeun Jeon (KOR)	1:34:35
2018	Duan Dandan (CHN)	1:35:12	Ravina (IND)	1:35:35	Yuki Yoshizumi (JPN)	1:35:52
2019	Ma Zhenxia (CHN)	1:28:28	Zhuoma Qiji (CHN)	1:29:06	Zhuoma Caixiang (CHN)	1:29:28
2023	Lan Gao (CHN)	1:29:25	Ayane Yanai (JPN)	1:30:58	Priyanka Goswami (IND)	1:32:27

== All time medal table ==
Rank	Nation	Gold	Silver	Bronze	Total
1	Japan	13	19	9	41
2	China	12	7	4	23
3	South Korea	3	1	9	13
4	India	2	2	5	9
5	Kazakhstan	1	1	3	5
6	Vietnam	0	1	1	2
Totals (6 entries)		31	31	31	93

== See also ==
- IAAF World Race Walking Cup
- European Race Walking Cup
- Pan American Race Walking Cup
- South American Race Walking Championships
- Oceania Race Walking Championships
- Central American Race Walking Championships
