= 2009 World Championships in Athletics – Men's 50 kilometres walk =

The men's 50 kilometre walk at the 2009 World Championships in Athletics took place on August 21, 2009, on the streets of Berlin, Germany. The event started and finished at the Brandenburg Gate.

Prior to the competition, previous winners did not appear to be medal prospects: the defending world champion Nathan Deakes missed the competition due to injury, and the reigning Olympic champion Alex Schwazer had failed to finish his sole 50 km race of the season. Frenchman Yohann Diniz, as the European Champion, was expected to perform well. The Russian team of world record holder Denis Nizhegorodov, Yuriy Andronov and former world champion Sergey Kirdyapkin appeared to be the strongest. Norwegians Erik Tysse and Trond Nymark were possible medallists as were Jesús Ángel García and Jared Tallent. Zhao Chengliang, Li Lei, and Xu Faguang were suggested as candidates to win the Chinese team's first medal of the championships.

The final began in wet conditions, but Yuki Yamazaki and Luke Adams built up a considerable early lead. Tallent and Diniz caught up with them around the 5 km mark, but a large pack of walkers containing a number of contenders remained not far off the leaders. After the first hour, a six-strong pack of Nizhegorodov and Kirdyapkin, Tallent and Adams, and Yamazaki and Diniz had broken away from the rest. At the halfway point Yamazaki, after receiving a number of warnings, was disqualified and Schwazer decided to prematurely stop his own race. The remaining five stayed in contention until the 40 km mark, where Nizhegorodov pulled out, and Diniz and Adams began to drift away from the leaders. Kirdyapkin sped ahead of Tallent and Trond Nymark had a late burst and caught up with the leaders. Kirdyapkin won, almost three minutes ahead of the rest of the competition, and Nymark took second. García, with a late charge, was not far behind and won the bronze medal.

The 2005 World Champion Kirdyapkin won his second title with a world-leading 3:38:35, the second fastest time of his career after his 2005 winning walk. It marked a racewalk Championship sweep for the Russians, with all three winners being coached by Viktor Chegin. Nymark won the first World Championship medal of career with a new Norwegian record, and veteran García won the fourth medal of his career, although his last came in 2001. A number of athletes set personal bests, including fourth placed Grzegorz Sudoł, but the season's fastest walkers had not performed well with Matej Tóth and Diniz finishing in tenth and twelfth, respectively.

On January 15, 2015, Kirdyapkin's results were disqualified for doping violations. Most of Chegin's athletes have received similar bans. Nymark received the gold medal in a ceremony during the 2016 European Athletics Championships.

== Medalists ==
Gold	Silver	Bronze
Trond Nymark; Norway	Jesús Angel García; Spain	Grzegorz Sudoł; Poland

== Abbreviations ==
- All times shown are in hours:minutes:seconds

DNS	did not start
NM	no mark
WR	world record
WL	world leading
AR	area record
NR	national record
PB	personal best
SB	season best

== Records ==
Prior to the competition, the following records were as follows.

World record	Denis Nizhegorodov (RUS)	3:34:14	Cheboksary, Russia	11 May 2008
Championship record	Robert Korzeniowski (POL)	3:36:03	Paris, France	27 August 2003
World leading	Yohann Diniz (FRA)	3:38:45	Dudince, Slovakia	28 March 2009
African record	Hatem Ghoula (TUN)	3:58:44	Santa Eulària des Riu, Spain	4 March 2007
Asian record	Yu Chaohong (CHN)	3:36:06	Nanjing, China	22 October 2005
North American record	Raúl González (MEX)	3:41:20	Poděbrady, Czechoslovakia	11 June 1978
South American record	Xavier Moreno (ECU)	3:52:07	Rio de Janeiro, Brazil	28 July 2007
European record	Denis Nizhegorodov (RUS)	3:34:14	Cheboksary, Russia	11 May 2008
Oceanian record	Nathan Deakes (AUS)	3:35:47	Geelong, Australia	2 December 2006

No new records was set during this competition.

== Qualification standards ==
Standard A	Standard B
3:58:00	4:09:00

== Schedule ==
Date	Time	Round
August 21, 2009	09:10	Final

== Results ==
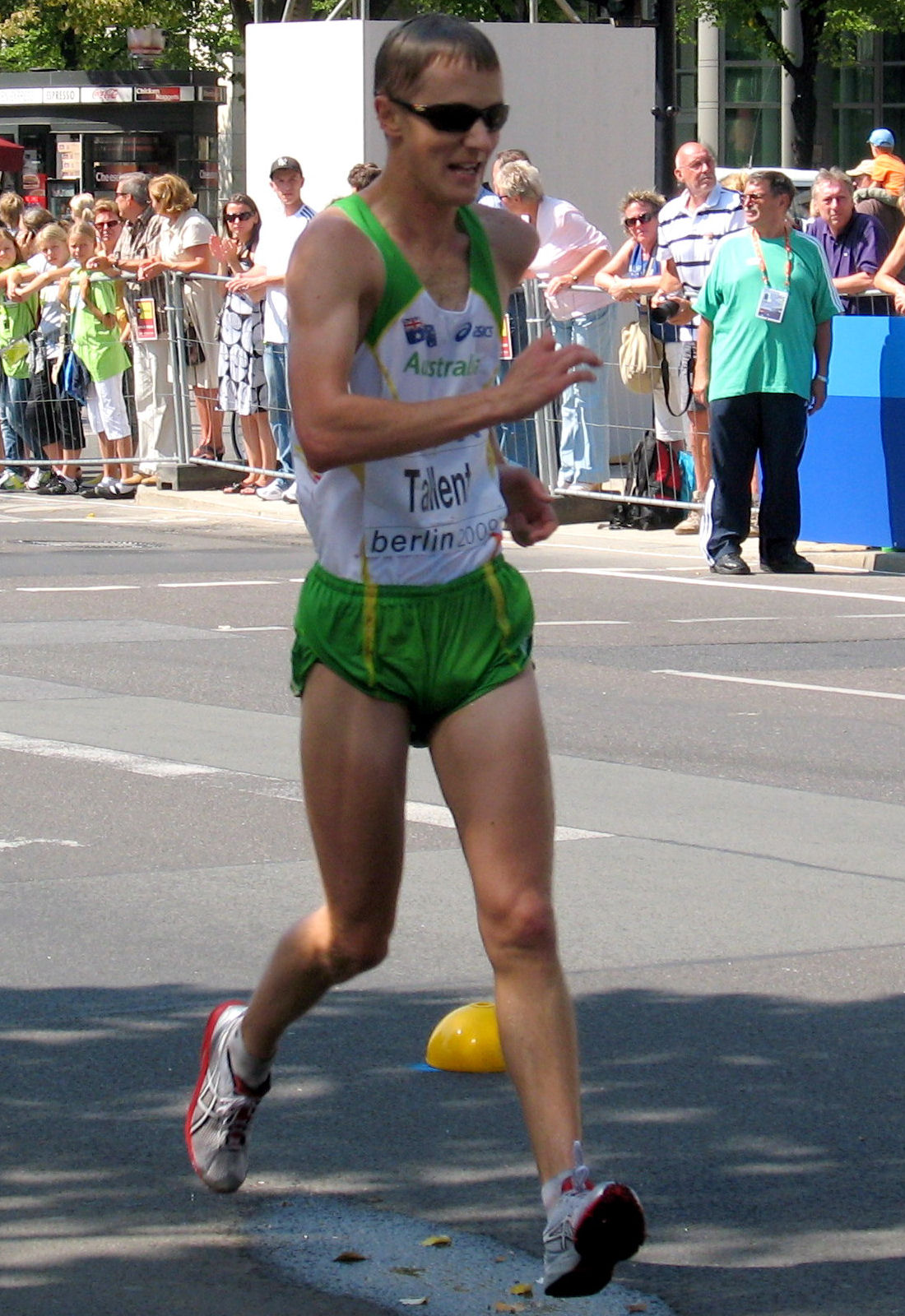
Olympic medallist Jared Tallent fell away from the top three in the final stages.

Rank	Athlete	Nationality	Time	Notes
~~1~~	Sergey Kirdyapkin	Russia	~~3:38:35~~	DQ (Doping)
1st place, gold medalist(s)	Trond Nymark	Norway	3:41:16	NR
2nd place, silver medalist(s)	Jesús Ángel García	Spain	3:41:37	SB
3rd place, bronze medalist(s)	Grzegorz Sudoł	Poland	3:42:34	PB
4	André Höhne	Germany	3:43:19	PB
5	Luke Adams	Australia	3:43:39	PB
6	Jared Tallent	Australia	3:44:50	SB
7	Marco De Luca	Italy	3:46:31	PB
8	Jarkko Kinnunen	Finland	3:47:36	PB
9	Matej Tóth	Slovakia	3:48:35	
10	Xu Faguang	China	3:48:52	PB
11	Yohann Diniz	France	3:49:03	
12	Jesús Sánchez	Mexico	3:50:55	PB
13	Donatas Škarnulis	Lithuania	3:50:56	SB
14	Zhao Chengliang	China	3:53:06	
15	Oleksiy Shelest	Ukraine	3:54:03	PB
16	Tadas Šuškevicius	Lithuania	3:54:29	PB
17	Koichiro Morioka	Japan	3:56:21	
18	Horacio Nava	Mexico	3:56:26	SB
19	Herve Davaux	France	3:57:10	PB
20	Andreas Gustafsson	Sweden	3:57:53	PB
21	Rafał Augustyn	Poland	3:58:30	
22	Augusto Cardoso	Portugal	3:59:10	SB
23	Miloš Bátovský	Slovakia	3:59:39	
24	Li Lei	China	4:00:13	
25	Mikel Odriozola	Spain	4:00:54	
26	Cédric Houssaye	France	4:02:44	SB
27	Diego Cafagna	Italy	4:08:04	
28	José Alejandro Cambil	Spain	4:13:14	
29	Mesías Zapata	Ecuador	4:15:28	
30	Luis Fernando García	Guatemala	4:18:13	SB
	Takayuki Tanii	Japan	DQ	
	Yuki Yamazaki	Japan	DQ	
	Omar Zepeda	Mexico	DQ	
	Mário dos Santos	Brazil	DNF	
	Marco Benavides	El Salvador	DNF	
	Konstadínos Stefanópoulos	Greece	DNF	
	Jamie Costin	Ireland	DNF	
	Colin Griffin	Ireland	DNF	
	Alex Schwazer	Italy	DNF	
	Ingus Janevics	Latvia	DNF	
	Konstadínos Stefanópoulos	Greece	DNF	
	Erik Tysse	Norway	DNF	
	Rafał Fedaczyński	Poland	DNF	
	António Pereira	Portugal	DNF	
	Yuriy Andronov	Russia	DNF	
	Denis Nizhegorodov	Russia	DNF	
	Nenad Filipović	Serbia	DNF	

Key: DNF = Did not finish, DQ = Disqualified, NR = National record, PB = Personal best, SB = Seasonal best, WL = World leading (in a given season)
