= 2010 IAAF Race Walking Challenge =

International race walking competition

The 2010 IAAF Race Walking Challenge was the eighth edition of the annual international racewalking series organised by the International Association of Athletics Federations (IAAF). Ten meetings are scheduled for the competition: the 2010 IAAF World Race Walking Cup, four IAAF permit meetings, and five area permit meetings.

Athletes who have gained enough points from competing at these meetings will be entered into the IAAF Race Walking Challenge Final, where they will compete for a total pot of US $200,000 in prize money.

== Calendar ==
The following ten meetings, as well as the competition final, form the schedule of the 2010 Race Walking Challenge. The "A" category meetings are worth the most points, with progressively fewer points being available through the "B" and "C" categories.

| Date | Meeting | Category | Events | Venue | Country | Report |
|---|---|---|---|---|---|---|
| 13 February | Australian 20k Racewalking Championships | C | 20 km (Men/Women) | Hobart | Australia | |
| 21 February | Meeting de Marcha Atlética da Cidade de Olhao | C | 20 km (Men/Women); 50 km (Men) | Olhão | Portugal | |
| 14 March | Gran Premio Citta di Lugano – Memorial Mario Albisetti | C | 20 km (Men/Women) | Lugano | Switzerland | |
| 27 March | Dudinska 50-ka | C | 10 km (Women); 20 km (Men); 50 km (Men) | Dudince | Slovakia | |
| 10 April | Grande Premio Internacional en Marcha Atletica | B | 20 km (Men/Women) | Rio Maior | Portugal | |
| 1 May | Coppa Città di Sesto San Giovanni | B | 20 km (Men/Women) | Sesto San Giovanni | Italy | |
| 15–16 May | 2010 IAAF World Race Walking Cup | A | 20 km (Men/Women); 50 km (Men) | Chihuahua City | Mexico | |
| 29 May | Na Rynek Marsz! | B | 10 km (Men/Women) | Kraków | Poland | |
| 11 June | International Race Walking Festival – Alytus | C | 20 km (Men/Women) | Alytus | Lithuania | |
| 19 June | Gran Premio Cantones de La Coruña | B | 20 km (Men/Women) | A Coruña | Spain | |
| 18 September | IAAF Race Walking Challenge Final | B | 10 km (Men/Women) | Beijing | China | |

== Winners ==
| # | Meeting | Men's winners | | | Women's winners | |
| # | Meeting | 10 km | 20 km | 50 km | 10 km | 20 km |
|---|---|---|---|---|---|---|
| 1 | Hobart | | Jared Tallent (AUS) | | | Claire Tallent (AUS) |
| 2 | Olhão | | Bertrand Moulinet (FRA) | Dionísio Ventura (POR) | | Vera Santos (POR) |
| 3 | Lugano | | Alex Schwazer (ITA) | | | Li Yanfei (CHN) |
| 4 | Dudince | | Matej Tóth (SVK) | Rafał Augustyn (POL) | | Zuzana Schindlerová (CZE) |
| 5 | Rio Maior | | Erik Tysse (NOR) | | | Vera Santos (POR) |
| 6 | Sesto San Giovanni | | Alex Schwazer (ITA) | | | Vera Santos (POR) |
| 7 | Chihuahua | | Wang Hao (CHN) | Matej Tóth (SVK) | | María Vasco (ESP) |
| 8 | Kraków | Zhu Yafei (CHN) | | | Olga Kaniskina (RUS) | |
| 9 | Alytus | | Herve Davaux (FRA) | | | Zuzana Malíková (SVK) |
| 10 | La Coruña | | Zhu Yafei (CHN) | | | Beatriz Pascual (ESP) |
| 11 | Beijing | Wang Zhen (CHN) | | | Tatyana Sibileva (RUS) | |
| Overall points winner | | Chu Yafei (CHN) | | | Vera Santos (POR) | |

== Challenge rankings ==
Men
| Rank | Athlete | Points |
|---|---|---|
| 1st | Chu Yafei (CHN) | 40 |
| 2nd | Matej Tóth (SVK) | 30 |
| 3rd = | Wang Hao (CHN) | 28 |
| 3rd = | Luis Fernando López (COL) | 28 |
| 5th | Jared Tallent (AUS) | 26 |
| 6th | Eder Sánchez (MEX) | 23 |
| 7th | Chen Ding (CHN) | 15 |
| 8th | Wang Zhen (CHN) | 13 |
| 9th | Luke Adams (AUS) | 10 |
| 10th | Xu Faguang (CHN) | 4 |
| 11th | João Vieira (POR) | 1 |

Women
| Rank | Athlete | Points |
|---|---|---|
| 1st | Vera Santos (POR) | 40 |
| 2nd | Melanie Seeger (GER) | 30 |
| 3rd | Inês Henriques (POR) | 25 |
| 4th | Li Yanfei (CHN) | 23 |
| 5th | Ana Cabecinha (POR) | 16 |
| 6th = | Jess Rothwell (AUS) | 13 |
| 6th = | Liu Hong (CHN) | 13 |
| 8th | Claire Tallent (AUS) | 7 |
| 9th | Susana Feitor (POR) | 6 |
| 10th = | Zuzana Malíková (SVK) | 5 |
| 10th = | Li Li (CHN) | 5 |
