= 50 kilometres race walk =

Olympic athletics event

Athletics 50 kilometre race walk
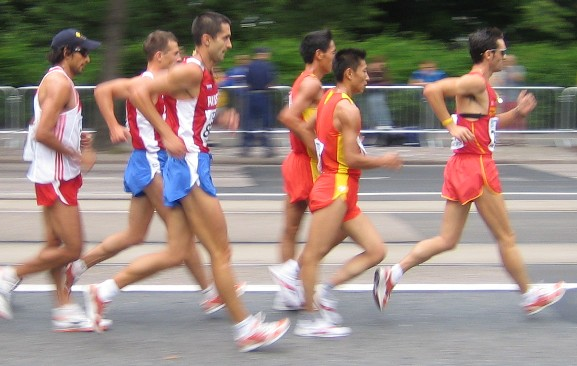
- Men's racewalk. Walker at right appears to be illegal in that both feet are off the ground, but an infraction is only committed when loss of contact is visible to the human eye.

World records
- Men: (France) Yohann Diniz 3:32:33 (2014)
- Women: (China) Liu Hong 3:59:15 (2019)

Olympic records
- Men: (Australia) Jared Tallent 3:36:53 (2012)

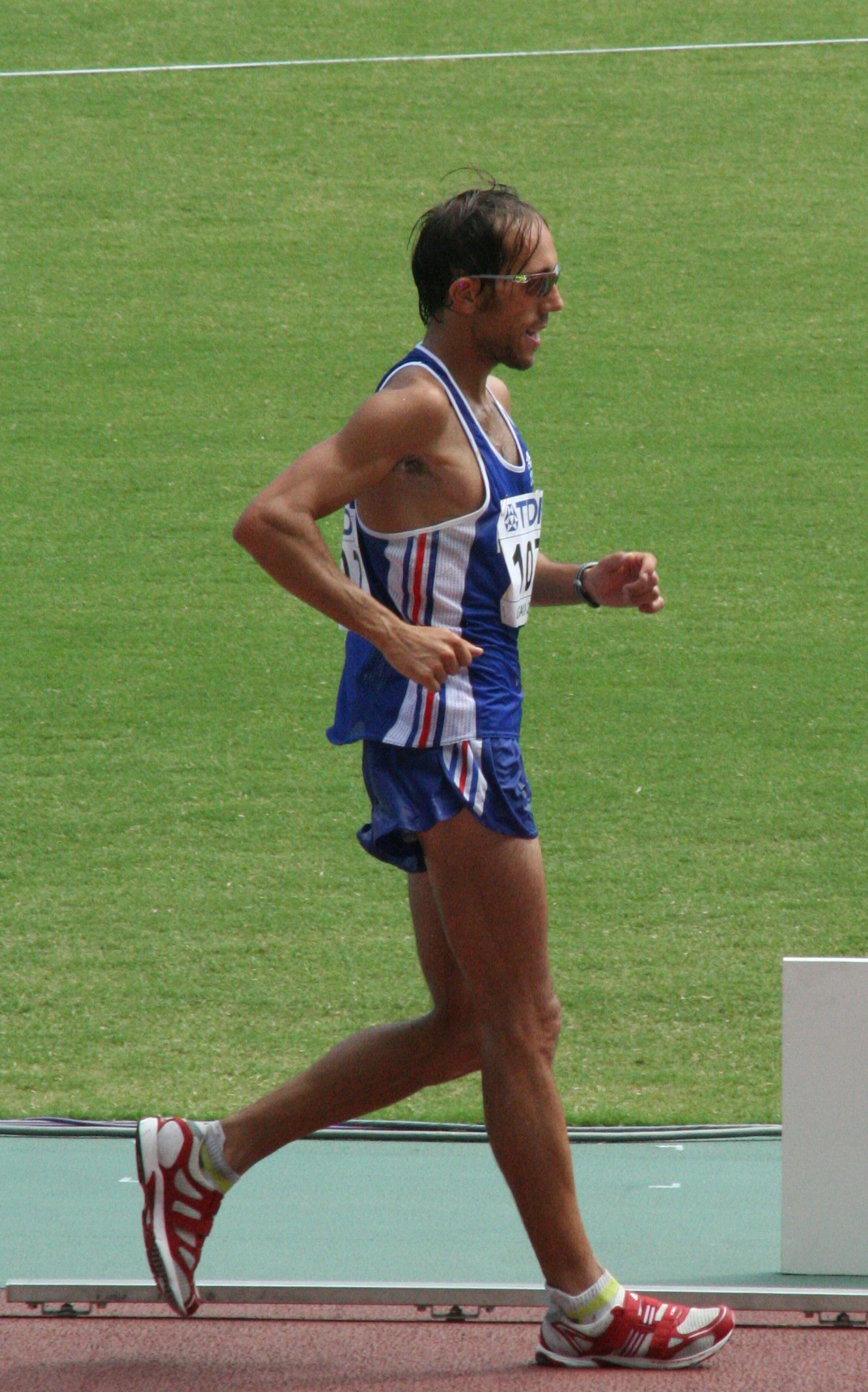
Yohann Diniz, world record holder

The 50 kilometre race walk was an Olympic athletics event that first appeared in 1932 and made its final Olympic appearance in 2021. The racewalking event is competed as a road race. Athletes must always keep in contact with the ground and the supporting leg must remain straight until the raised leg passes it.

50 kilometres is approximately 31 miles.

The 50 kilometres race walk was dropped from the Olympic program after the 2020 Tokyo Games in 2021 and was replaced by a mixed team race, the marathon race walk mixed relay in order to achieve gender equality.

== World records ==
The men's world record for the 50 km race walk was held by Denis Nizhegorodov, through his race of 3:34:14 in Cheboksary in 2008, until it was beaten by Yohann Diniz at the 2014 European Athletics Championships in Zurich, in a time of 3:32:33.

== Area records ==
- Updated 21 May 2026.

Area	Men			Women		
Area	Time	Season	Athlete	Time	Season	Athlete
World	3:32:33	2014	Yohann Diniz (FRA)	3:59:15	2019	Liu Hong (CHN)
Area records
Africa (records)	3:53:09	2021	Marc Mundell (RSA)	4:48:00	2018	Natalie le Roux (RSA)
Asia (records)	3:36:06	2005	Yu Chaohong (CHN)	3:59:15	2019	Liu Hong (CHN)
Europe (records)	3:32:33	2014	Yohann Diniz (FRA)	4:04:50	2019	Eleonora Anna Giorgi (ITA)
North, Central America and Caribbean (records)	3:41:09	2013	Erick Barrondo (GUA)	4:13:56	2019	Mirna Ortiz (GUA)
Oceania (records)	3:35:47	2006	Nathan Deakes (AUS)	4:09:33	2018	Claire Tallent (AUS)
South America (records)	3:42:57	2016	Andrés Chocho (ECU)	4:11:12	2019	Johana Ordóñez (ECU)

== All-time top 25 ==
=== Men ===
- Correct as of December 2021.

Rank	Time	Athlete	Nationality	Date	Place	Ref.
1	3:32:33	Yohann Diniz	France	15 August 2014	Zürich	
2	3:34:14	Denis Nizhegorodov	Russia	11 May 2008	Cheboksary	
3	3:34:38	Matej Tóth	Slovakia	21 March 2015	Dudince	
4	3:35:47	Nathan Deakes	Australia	2 December 2006	Geelong	
5	3:36:03	Robert Korzeniowski	Poland	27 August 2003	Saint-Denis	
6	3:36:04	Alex Schwazer	Italy	11 February 2007	Rosignano Solvay	
7	3:36:06	Yu Chaohong	China	22 October 2005	Nanjing	
8	3:36:13	Zhao Chengliang	China	22 October 2005	Nanjing	
9	3:36:20	Han Yucheng	China	27 February 2005	Nanning	
10	3:36:42	German Skurygin	Russia	27 August 2003	Saint-Denis	
11	3:36:45	Masatora Kawano	Japan	27 October 2019	Takahata	
12	3:36:53	Jared Tallent	Australia	11 August 2012	London	
13	3:37:16	Si Tianfeng	China	11 August 2012	London	
14	3:37:26	Valeriy Spitsyn	Russia	21 May 2000	Moskva	
15	3:37:39	Satoshi Maruo	Japan	27 October 2019	Takahata	
16	3:37:41	Andrey Perlov	Soviet Union	5 August 1989	Leningrad	
16	3:37:41	Ivan Noskov	Russia	15 August 2014	Zürich	
18	3:37:46	Andreas Erm	Germany	27 August 2003	Saint-Denis	
19	3:37:54	Robert Heffernan	Ireland	11 August 2012	London	
20	3:37:58	Xing Shucai	China	27 February 2005	Nanning	
21	3:38:01	Aleksey Voyevodin	Russia	27 August 2003	Saint-Denis	
22	3:38:02	Wang Qin	China	9 March 2019	Huangshan	
23	3:38:08	Sergey Kirdyapkin	Russia	12 August 2005	Helsinki	
23	3:38:08	Igor Yerokhin	Russia	8 June 2008	Saransk	
25	3:38:17	Ronald Weigel	East Germany	25 May 1986	Potsdam	

==== Notes ====
Below is a list of other times equal or superior to 3:38:17:

- Yohann Diniz also walked 3:33:12 (2017), 3:37:43 (2019), 3:37:48 (2016).
- Denis Nizhegorodov also walked 3:35:29 (2004), 3:38:02 (2006).
- Matej Tóth also walked 3:36:21 (2014).
- Robert Korzeniowski also walked 3:36:39 (2002).
- Alex Schwazer also walked 3:37:04 (2008), 3:37:09 (2008).
- Robert Heffernan also walked 3:37:56 (2013).

=== Women ===
- Correct as of June 2021.

Rank	Time	Athlete	Nationality	Date	Place	Ref.
1	3:50:42 (Note: Not recognised by World Athletics)	Yelena Lashmanova	Russia	5 September 2020	Voronovo	
2	3:57:08 (Note: Not recognised by World Athletics due to lack of international judges.)	Klavdiya Afanasyeva	Russia	15 June 2019	Cheboksary	
3	3:59:15	Liu Hong	China	9 March 2019	Huangshan	
4	3:59:56	Margarita Nikiforova	Russia	5 September 2020	Voronovo	
5	4:03:51 (Note: Not recognised by World Athletics)	Li Maocuo	China	9 March 2019	Huangshan	
6	4:04:36	Liang Rui	China	5 May 2018	Taicang	
7	4:04:50	Eleonora Giorgi	Italy	19 May 2019	Alytus	
8	4:05:46	Júlia Takács	Spain	19 May 2019	Alytus	
9	4:05:56	Inês Henriques	Portugal	13 August 2017	London	
10	4:07:30	Ma Faying	China	9 March 2019	Huangshan	
11	4:08:58	Yin Hang	China	13 August 2017	London	
12	4:09:33	Claire Tallent	Australia	5 May 2018	Taicang	
13	4:10:59	Monica Svensson	Sweden	21 October 2007	Scanzorosciate	
14	4:11:01	Raquel González	Spain	10 February 2019	El Vendrell	
15	4:11:12	Johana Ordóñez	Ecuador	11 August 2019	Lima	
16	4:12:16	Yelena Ginko	Belarus	17 October 2004	Scanzorosciate	
17	4:12:44	Alina Tsviliy	Ukraine	7 August 2018	Berlin	
18	4:12:56	Paola Pérez	Ecuador	5 May 2018	Taicang	
19	4:13:56	Mirna Ortíz	Guatemala	24 February 2019	Guatemala City	
20	4:14:25	Mária Czaková	Slovakia	24 March 2018	Dudince	
21	4:14:31	Jiang Pengqin	China	9 March 2019	Huangshan	
22	4:14:49	Bai Tiantian	China	9 March 2019	Huangshan	
23	4:15:33	Wang Yingliu	China	9 March 2019	Huangshan	
24	4:15:42	Mayra Herrera	Guatemala	9 September 2017	Owego	
25	4:15:46	Mar Juárez	Spain	16 February 2020	Torrevieja	

==== Notes ====
Below is a list of other times equal or superior to 4:15:46:

- Margarita Nikiforova also walked 4:03:07 (2021).
- Inês Henriques also walked 4:08:26 (2017), 4:09:21 (2018), 4:13:57 (2019).
- Yin Hang also walked 4:09:09 (2018).
- Claire Tallent also walked 4:12:44 (2019).
- Júlia Takács also walked 4:13:04 (2018), 4:15:22 (2018).
- Ma Faying also walked 4:13:28 (2018).
- Johana Ordóñez also walked 4:14:28 (2018).
- Monica Svensson also walked 4:14:38 (2009).
- Klavdiya Afanasyeva also walked 4:14:46 (2018).
- Li Maocuo also walked 4:14:47 (2018).
- Mirna Ortíz also walked 4:15:21 (2019).

== Olympic medalists ==
=== Men’s ===
Games	Gold	Silver	Bronze
1932 Los Angeles	Tommy Green; Great Britain	Jānis Daliņš; Latvia	Ugo Frigerio; Italy
1936 Berlin	Harold Whitlock; Great Britain	Arthur Tell Schwab; Switzerland	Adalberts Bubenko; Latvia
1948 London	John Ljunggren; Sweden	Gaston Godel; Switzerland	Tebbs Lloyd Johnson; Great Britain
1952 Helsinki	Pino Dordoni; Italy	Josef Doležal; Czechoslovakia	Antal Róka; Hungary
1956 Melbourne	Norman Read; New Zealand	Yevgeny Maskinskov; Soviet Union	John Ljunggren; Sweden
1960 Rome	Don Thompson; Great Britain	John Ljunggren; Sweden	Abdon Pamich; Italy
1964 Tokyo	Abdon Pamich; Italy	Paul Nihill; Great Britain	Ingvar Pettersson; Sweden
1968 Mexico City	Christoph Höhne; East Germany	Antal Kiss; Hungary	Larry Young; United States
1972 Munich	Bernd Kannenberg; West Germany	Veniamin Soldatenko; Soviet Union	Larry Young; United States
1976 Montreal	not included in the Olympic program		
1980 Moscow	Hartwig Gauder; East Germany	Jordi Llopart; Spain	Yevgeniy Ivchenko; Soviet Union
1984 Los Angeles	Raúl González; Mexico	Bo Gustafsson; Sweden	Sandro Bellucci; Italy
1988 Seoul	Vyacheslav Ivanenko; Soviet Union	Ronald Weigel; East Germany	Hartwig Gauder; East Germany
1992 Barcelona	Andrey Perlov; Unified Team	Carlos Mercenario; Mexico	Ronald Weigel; Germany
1996 Atlanta	Robert Korzeniowski; Poland	Mikhail Shchennikov; Russia	Valentí Massana; Spain
2000 Sydney	Robert Korzeniowski; Poland	Aigars Fadejevs; Latvia	Joel Sánchez; Mexico
2004 Athens	Robert Korzeniowski; Poland	Denis Nizhegorodov; Russia	Aleksey Voyevodin; Russia
2008 Beijing	Alex Schwazer; Italy	Jared Tallent; Australia	Denis Nizhegorodov; Russia
2012 London	Jared Tallent; Australia	Si Tianfeng; China	Robert Heffernan; Ireland
2016 Rio de Janeiro	Matej Tóth; Slovakia	Jared Tallent; Australia	Hirooki Arai; Japan
2020 Tokyo	Dawid Tomala; Poland	Jonathan Hilbert; Germany	Evan Dunfee; Canada

== World Championships medalists ==
=== Men’s ===
Championships	Gold	Silver	Bronze
1976 Malmö	Veniamin Soldatenko (URS)	Enrique Vera (MEX)	Reima Salonen (FIN)
1983 Helsinki	Ronald Weigel (GDR)	José Marín (ESP)	Sergey Yung (URS)
1987 Rome	Hartwig Gauder (GDR)	Ronald Weigel (GDR)	Vyacheslav Ivanenko (URS)
1991 Tokyo	Aleksandr Potashov (URS)	Andrey Perlov (URS)	Hartwig Gauder (GER)
1993 Stuttgart	Jesús Ángel García (ESP)	Valentin Kononen (FIN)	Valeriy Spitsyn (RUS)
1995 Gothenburg	Valentin Kononen (FIN)	Giovanni Perricelli (ITA)	Robert Korzeniowski (POL)
1997 Athens	Robert Korzeniowski (POL)	Jesús Ángel García (ESP)	Miguel Rodríguez (MEX)
1999 Seville	Ivano Brugnetti (ITA)	Nikolay Matyukhin (RUS)	Curt Clausen (USA)
2001 Edmonton	Robert Korzeniowski (POL)	Jesús Ángel García (ESP)	Edgar Hernández (MEX)
2003 Saint-Denis	Robert Korzeniowski (POL)	German Skurygin (RUS)	Andreas Erm (GER)
2005 Helsinki	Sergey Kirdyapkin (RUS)	Aleksey Voyevodin (RUS)	Alex Schwazer (ITA)
2007 Osaka	Nathan Deakes (AUS)	Yohann Diniz (FRA)	Alex Schwazer (ITA)
2009 Berlin	Trond Nymark (NOR)	Jesús Ángel García (ESP)	Grzegorz Sudoł (POL)
2011 Daegu	Sergey Bakulin (RUS)	Denis Nizhegorodov (RUS)	Jared Tallent (AUS)
2013 Moscow	Robert Heffernan (IRL)	Mikhail Ryzhov (RUS)	Jared Tallent (AUS)
2015 Beijing	Matej Tóth (SVK)	Jared Tallent (AUS)	Takayuki Tanii (JPN)
2017 London	Yohann Diniz (FRA)	Hirooki Arai (JPN)	Kai Kobayashi (JPN)
2019 Doha	Yusuke Suzuki (JPN)	João Vieira (POR)	Evan Dunfee (CAN)

=== Women’s ===
Championships	Gold	Silver	Bronze
2017 London	Inês Henriques (POR)	Yin Hang (CHN)	Yang Shuqing (CHN)
2019 Doha	Liang Rui (CHN)	Li Maocuo (CHN)	Eleonora Giorgi (ITA)
