= 2005 World Championships in Athletics – Men's 20 kilometres walk =

The Men's 20 km race walk event at the 2005 World Championships in Athletics was held on August 6 in the streets of Helsinki with the start at 18:40h local time, and the goal line situated in the Helsinki Olympic Stadium.

The winning margin was 61 seconds which as of 2024 remains the only time the men's 20 km walk was won by more than 45 seconds at these championships.

== Medalists ==
Gold	Jefferson Pérez; Ecuador (ECU)
Silver	Paquillo Fernández; Spain (ESP)
Bronze	Juan Manuel Molina; Spain (ESP)

== Abbreviations ==
- All times shown are in hours:minutes:seconds

DNS	did not start
NM	no mark
WR	world record
AR	area record
NR	national record
PB	personal best
SB	season best

== Records ==
Standing records prior to the 2005 World Athletics Championships
World Record	Jefferson Pérez (ECU)	1:17.21	August 23, 2003	Paris, France
Event Record	Jefferson Pérez (ECU)	1:17.21	August 23, 2003	Paris, France

== Intermediates ==
Rank	Number	Athlete	Time
5 KILOMETRES
1	227	Paquillo Fernández (ESP)	19:47
2	156	Yu Chaohong (CHN)	19:47
3	158	Zhu Hongjun (CHN)	19:47
4	832	Vladimir Stankin (RUS)	19:47
5	459	Ivano Brugnetti (ITA)	19:47
10 KILOMETRES
1	227	Paquillo Fernández (ESP)	39:31
2	459	Ivano Brugnetti (ITA)	39:32
3	158	Zhu Hongjun (CHN)	39:32
4	818	Ilya Markov (RUS)	39:32
5	210	Jefferson Pérez (ECU)	39:32
15 KILOMETRES
1	227	Paquillo Fernández (ESP)	59:10
2	210	Jefferson Pérez (ECU)	59:10
3	212	Rolando Saquipay (ECU)	59:22
4	240	Juan Manuel Molina (ESP)	59:23
5	158	Zhu Hongjun (CHN)	59:29

== Final ranking ==
Rank	Athlete	Time	Note
1st place, gold medalist(s)	Jefferson Pérez (ECU)	1:18:35	SB
2nd place, silver medalist(s)	Paquillo Fernández (ESP)	1:19:36	
3rd place, bronze medalist(s)	Juan Manuel Molina (ESP)	1:19:44	PB
4	André Höhne (GER)	1:20:00	PB
5	Hatem Ghoula (TUN)	1:20:19	SB
6	Vladimir Stankin (RUS)	1:20:25	
7	Benjamin Kuciński (POL)	1:20:34	
8	Eder Sánchez (MEX)	1:20:45	
9	Zhu Hongjun (CHN)	1:21:01	
10	Luke Adams (AUS)	1:21:43	
11	Andriy Yurin (UKR)	1:22:15	
12	Luis Fernando López (COL)	1:22:28	
13	Erik Tysse (NOR)	1:22:45	
14	Lorenzo Civallero (ITA)	1:22:52	SB
15	Sérgio Galdino (BRA)	1:23:03	
16	Shin Il-Yong (KOR)	1:23:10	
17	Aigars Fadejevs (LAT)	1:23:12	
18	Jared Tallent (AUS)	1:23:42	
19	Silviu Casandra (ROM)	1:23:46	
20	Andrei Talashko (BLR)	1:23:52	
21	Matej Tóth (SVK)	1:23:55	
22	José Ignacio Díaz (ESP)	1:24:00	
23	Takayuki Tanii (JPN)	1:24:17	
24	Kamil Kalka (POL)	1:25:02	
25	Akihiro Sugimoto (JPN)	1:25:28	
26	Rafał Dyś (POL)	1:26:35	
27	Edwin Centeno (PER)	1:26:45	
28	Liu Yunfeng (CHN)	1:26:54	
29	Koichiro Morioka (JPN)	1:27:08	
30	John Nunn (USA)	1:27:10	SB
31	Timothy Seaman (USA)	1:29:58	
32	Bengt Bengtsson (SWE)	1:30:10	
DID NOT FINISH (DNF)
—	Ivano Brugnetti (ITA)	DNF	
—	Viktor Burayev (RUS)	DNF	
—	João Vieira (POR)	DNF	
DISQUALIFIED (DSQ)
—	Ilya Markov (RUS)	DSQ	
—	Bernardo Segura (MEX)	DSQ	
—	Ivan Trotski (BLR)	DSQ	
—	Yu Chaohong (CHN)	DSQ	
—	Cristian Berdeja (MEX)	DSQ	
—	Robert Heffernan (IRL)	DSQ	
—	Walter Sandoval (ESA)	DSQ	
—	Rolando Saquipay (ECU)	DSQ	

== See also ==
- 2005 Race Walking Year Ranking
