= Lü Ronghua =

Chinese racewalker (born 1983)

Medal record

Men's athletics

Representing China

Asian Championships
Gold medal – first place	2005 Incheon	20 km walk

Lü Ronghua (Chinese: 吕荣华; born 21 February 1983) is a Chinese male racewalker who competed mainly in the 20 kilometres race walk. He was the 2005 champion in that event at the Asian Athletics Championships.

Lü had his first international success at the 2002 World Junior Championships in Athletics, where he was the bronze medallist in the 10,000 metres race walk behind Russian Vladimir Kanaykin and fellow Chinese Xu Xingde. He competed on the IAAF Race Walking Challenge in 2004, taking fourth in the Kunshan 20 km walk just one second off his personal best with a time of 1:20:55 hours.

He finished the distance in under one hour twenty minutes at the start of the 2005 season, crossing the line in a much improved time of 1:18:50 hours to place runner-up at the Dudinska Patdesiatka. He was sixth against an international field at the Grande Prémio Internacional de Rio Maior em Marcha Atlética and set a new best in the 50 kilometres race walk at 3:45:05 hours. This built up to his selection for the 2005 Asian Athletics Championships where he defeated South Korea's Kim Hyun-sub to take the gold medal.

In 2006 he failed to improve, having a season's best of only 1:21:48 hours and he ranked 27th at the 2006 IAAF World Race Walking Cup, leaving China in fourth place in the men's team rankings. He set a time of 1:20:16 hours in Shenzhen in 2007 but again fell to a lower standard at the 2008 IAAF World Race Walking Cup, finishing in 1:22:41 hours in 26th place. The Chinese men's team fared even worse than two years earlier as Lü was the second highest finisher, after Han Yucheng in 22nd. After a time of 1:22:16 hours in Jinan in 2009, he ceased competing at a high level.

== International competitions ==
Year	Competition	Venue	Position	Event	Notes
2002	World Junior Championships	Kingston, Jamaica	3rd	10,000 m walk	41:46.07
2005	Asian Championships	Incheon, South Korea	1st	20 km walk	1:25:30
2006	World Race Walking Cup	A Coruña, Spain	27th	20 km walk	1:23:17
2008	World Race Walking Cup	Cheboksary, Russia	26th	20 km walk	1:22:41
