= Gurmeet Singh =

Gurmeet Singh may refer to:

- Gurmmeet Singh (director), Indian film and television director
- Gurmeet Singh (footballer), Indian footballer
- Gurmeet Singh (racewalker), Indian athlete
- Gurmeet Ram Rahim Singh, head of the Indian social group Dera Sacha Sauda

== See also ==
- Gurmit Singh, Singaporean actor
- Gurmit Singh (general), Governor of Uttarakhand and retired Indian Army officer
