= Kirdyapkin =

Kirdyapkin (Russian: Кирдяпкин) is a Russian masculine surname; its feminine counterpart is Kirdyapkina. Notable people with the name include:

- Anisya Kirdyapkina (born 1989), Russian race walker
- Sergey Kirdyapkin (born 1980), Russian race walker, husband of Anisya
