= Yuki Yamazaki =

Yuki Yamazaki may refer to:

- Yuki Yamazaki (footballer), Japanese footballer
- Yuki Yamazaki (racewalker), Japanese race walker
- Yuki Yamazaki, a character in the game Hitman
