= 2005 World Championships in Athletics – Men's 50 kilometres walk =

The Men's 50 km race walk at the 2005 World Championships in Athletics was held on August 12 in the streets of Helsinki with the goal line situated in the Helsinki Olympic Stadium.

== Medalists ==
Gold	Sergey Kirdyapkin; Russia (RUS)
Silver	Aleksey Voyevodin; Russia (RUS)
Bronze	Alex Schwazer; Italy (ITA)

== Abbreviations ==
- All times shown are in hours:minutes:seconds

DNS	did not start
NM	no mark
WR	world record
WL	world leading
AR	area record
NR	national record
PB	personal best
SB	season best

== Finishing times ==
1. Sergey Kirdyapkin, Russia 3:38:08 (PB)
2. Aleksey Voyevodin, Russia 3:41:25
3. Alex Schwazer, Italy 3:41:54 (NR)
4. Trond Nymark, Norway 3:44:04 (NR)
5. Zhao Chengliang, China 3:44:45
6. Omar Zepeda, Mexico 3:49:01
7. Roman Magdziarczyk, Poland 3:49:55 (SB)
8. Yuki Yamazaki, Japan 3:51:15
9. Horacio Nava, Mexico 3:53:57
10. Peter Korčok, Slovakia 3:55:02
11. Tim Berrett, Canada 3:55:48
12. Julio Rene Martinez, Guatemala 3:57:56
13. Marco De Luca, Italy 3:58:32
14. Denis Langlois, France 3:59:31
15. Ken Akashi, Japan 3:59:35
16. Kim Dong-Young, South Korea 4:01:25 (SB)
17. Modris Liepinš, Latvia 4:01:54 (SB)
18. Miloš Bátovský, Slovakia 4:05:44
19. Sergey Korepanov, Kazakhstan 4:06:23 (SB)
20. Pedro Martins, Portugal 4:08:12
21. Antti Kempas, Finland 4:10:30
22. Jorge Costa, Portugal 4:22:17
23. Philip Dunn, United States 4:25:27

=== Athletes who did not finish ===
- Han Yucheng, China
- Xing Shucai, China
- Oleksiy Kazanin, Ukraine
- Rafal Fedaczynski, Poland
- Andrey Stepanchuk, Belarus
- Sérgio Galdino, Brazil
- Luis Fernando García, Guatemala

=== Athletes disqualified ===
- Fredrik Svensson, Sweden
- Craig Barrett, New Zealand
- Jesús Angel García, Spain
- Jani Lehtinen, Finland
- Aleksandar Raković, Serbia and Montenegro
- Viktor Ginko, Belarus
- Miloš Holuša, Czech Republic
- Aigars Fadejevs, Latvia
- Mikel Odriozola, Spain
- Grzegorz Sudol, Poland
- Vladimir Kanaykin, Russia
- Diego Cafagna, Italy
- Miguel Solis, Mexico
- Yohann Diniz, France

== See also ==
- 2005 Race Walking Year Ranking
