= Masumi Fuchise =

Japanese racewalker (born 1986)

Personal information
- Born: September 2, 1986 (age 40) Himeji, Japan
- Height: 1.61 m (5 ft 3 1/2 in)
- Weight: 50 kg (110 lb)

Sport
- Country: Japan
- Sport: Athletics
- Event: 20km Race Walk
Medal record
Universiade
Silver medal – second place	2009 Belgrade	20 km walk

Masumi Fuchise (渕瀬 真寿美) (born 2 September 1986) is a Japanese racewalker. She was seventh at the 2009 World Championships in Athletics and is a two-time Asian Race Walking Champion. In 2009, she set the Japanese record for the 20 kilometres race walk event. She also won the silver medal at the 2009 Summer Universiade.

== Career ==
Born in Himeji, Hyogo, Fuchise was originally a runner but switched to race walking after injury. She first enjoyed success at college level when she won the 10,000 metres track walk at the 2005 Japanese Inter-Collegiate Championships. She made her global debut on national turf at the 2007 World Championships in Athletics, held in Osaka. Fuchise finished in 27th place in the women's 20 km walk, somewhat behind compatriot Mayumi Kawasaki who was tenth. The following year she took part in the Asian Race Walking Championships and although Kawasaki won the title, Fuchise reached the podium to win the bronze medal and also achieved the Olympic "A" standard time. She did not compete at the 2008 Summer Olympics in Beijing that year, missing qualification after a poor tactical race at the 2008 Japanese National Championship, which was also an Olympic qualifying event.

Fuchise proved herself as the country's top walker at the national 20 km walk championships in January 2009 – she won the event and also broke the Japanese record for the distance with her time of 1:28:03. She stepped up at continental level also, winning the gold medal at the 2009 Asian Race Walking Championships, ahead of compatriot Kumi Otoshi. She took to the IAAF World Race Walking Challenge circuit and made the top eight at the Coppa Città di Sesto San Giovanni in Italy. In July that year she attended the 2009 Summer Universiade where she won the silver medal in the walk behind Olga Mikhaylova (who broke the Games record). Having qualified through her national win, she competed at the 2009 World Championships in Athletics. She finished seventh overall in the women's race – the second best performance by an Asian walker after bronze medallist Liu Hong of China.

She won the 2010 Asian Race Walking Championships in Nomi City in March, taking her second continental title in a time of 1:29:35. Later that year she placed 24th at the 2010 IAAF World Race Walking Cup. At the 2011 All-Japan Race Walking Championships she was runner-up to Kumi Otoshi, and she was the fastest Japanese finisher at the event in Nomi the following year.

== Personal bests ==
Event	Time (h:m:s)	Venue	Date
5000 m track walk	21:54.07	Amagasaki, Japan	19 May 2013
10,000 m track walk	44:52.90	Tokyo, Japan	10 June 2007
10 km walk	44:23	Kobe, Japan	28 January 2007
20 km walk	1:28:03 NR	Kobe, Japan	25 January 2009

- All information taken from IAAF profile.
