= 2002 World Junior Championships in Athletics – Men's 10,000 metres walk =

The men's 10,000 metres walk event at the 2002 World Junior Championships in Athletics was held in Kingston, Jamaica, at National Stadium on 17 July.

== Medalists ==
Gold	Vladimir Kanaykin; Russia
Silver	Xu Xingde; China
Bronze	Lu Ronghua; China

== Results ==
=== Final ===
17 July

Rank	Name	Nationality	Time	Notes
1st place, gold medalist(s)	Vladimir Kanaykin	Russia	41:41.40	
2nd place, silver medalist(s)	Xu Xingde	China	41:44.00	
3rd place, bronze medalist(s)	Lu Ronghua	China	41:46.07	
4	Rafael Duarte	Brazil	42:00.39	
5	Yuki Yamazaki	Japan	42:02.76	
6	Mikhail Seradovich	Belarus	42:17.58	
7	Takayuki Tanii	Japan	42:24.54	
8	Daniele Paris	Italy	42:40.02	
9	Marko Lepojevic	Yugoslavia	43:31.14	
10	Luis Manuel Corchete	Spain	43:41.21	
11	Adrián Herrera	Mexico	43:59.36	
12	Benjamin Sánchez	Spain	44:22.59	
13	André Katzinski	Germany	44:27.77	
14	Jiří Chaloupka	Czech Republic	44:39.98	
15	Norbert Polonkai	Hungary	44:44.39	
16	Matej Tóth	Slovakia	45:05.02	
17	Ben Shorey	United States	45:22.42	
18	Andrés Chocho	Ecuador	45:28.60	
19	Jared Tallent	Australia	45:41.19	
20	Michal Blazek	Slovakia	45:56.91	
21	Álvaro García	Mexico	46:08.55	
22	Lim Moon-Sup	South Korea	46:44.11	
23	Carlos Borgoño	Chile	47:03.91	
24	Levente Kapéri	Hungary	47:28.00	
25	Cristián Bascuñán	Chile	48:27.43	
	Sigbjørn Sandberg	Norway	DQ	
	Dom King	United Kingdom	DQ	
	Ivan Kuznetsov	Russia	DQ	
	Scott Holloway	Australia	DNF	
	Salvador Mira	El Salvador	DNF	

== Participation ==
According to an unofficial count, 30 athletes from 21 countries participated in the event.

- Australia (2)
- Belarus (1)
- Brazil (1)
- Chile (2)
- China (2)
- Czech Republic (1)
- Ecuador (1)
- El Salvador (1)
- Germany (1)
- Hungary (2)
- Italy (1)
- Japan (2)
- Mexico (2)
- Norway (1)
- Russia (2)
- Slovakia (2)
- South Korea (1)
- Spain (2)
- United Kingdom (1)
- United States (1)
- Yugoslavia (1)
