= Jared Tallent =

Australian race walker (born 1984)

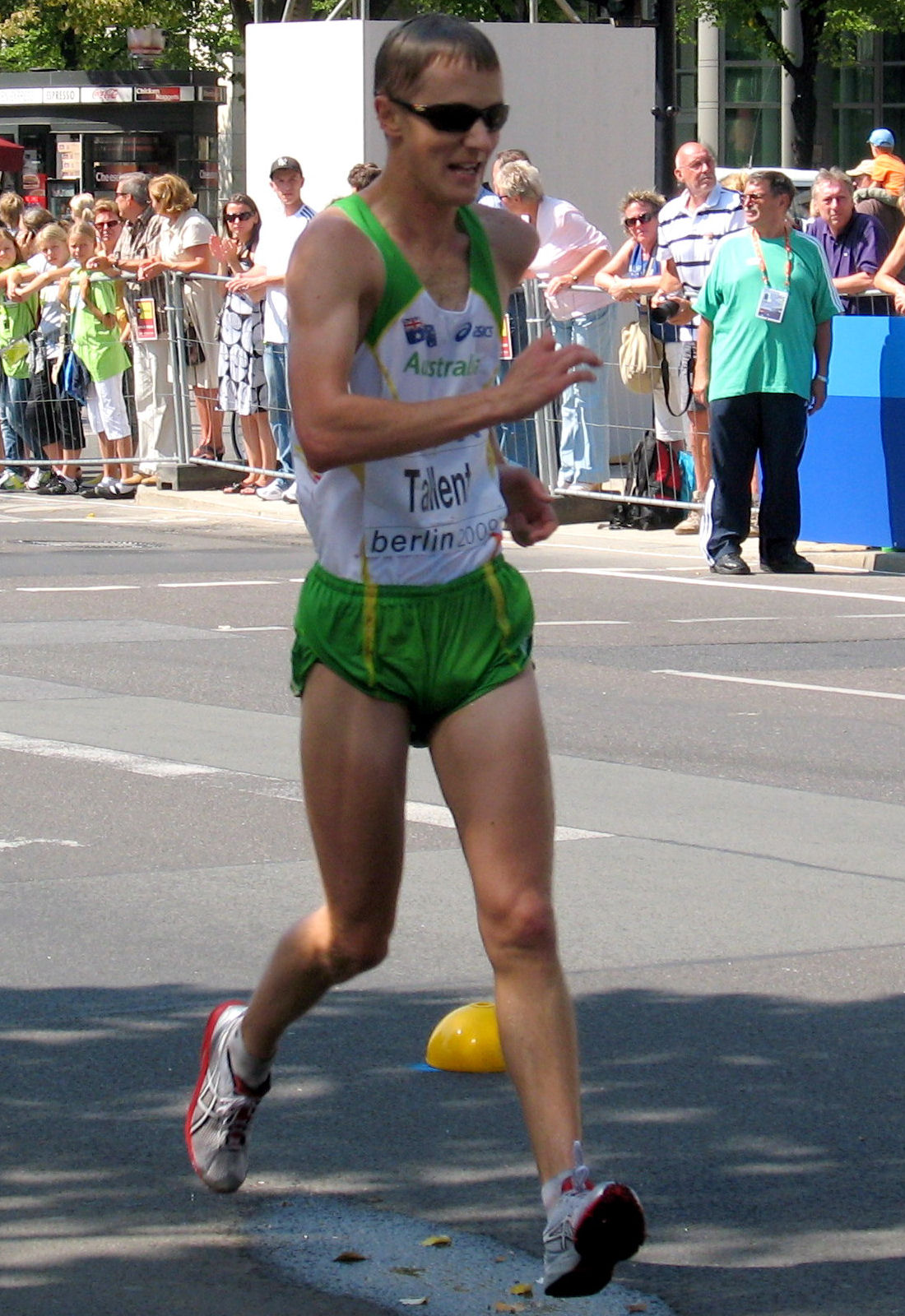
- 2009

Personal information
- Born: 17 October 1984 (age 42) Ballarat, Victoria
- Height: 1.78 m (5 ft 10 in)
- Weight: 58 kg (128 lb)

Sport
- Country: Australia
- Sport: Athletics
- Events: 20 km Race Walk, 50 km Race Walk
Medal record
Olympic Games
Gold medal – first place	2012 London	50 km walk
Silver medal – second place	2008 Beijing	50 km walk
Silver medal – second place	2016 Rio de Janeiro	50 km walk
Bronze medal – third place	2008 Beijing	20 km walk
World Championships
Silver medal – second place	2011 Daegu	50 km walk
Silver medal – second place	2013 Moscow	50 km walk
Silver medal – second place	2015 Beijing	50 km walk
Commonwealth Games
Gold medal – first place	2010 New Delhi	20 km walk
Bronze medal – third place	2006 Melbourne	20 km walk
World Race Walking Cup
Gold medal – first place	2016 Rome	50 km walk
Gold medal – first place	2012 Saransk	50 km walk
Silver medal – second place	2006 A Coruña	20 km teamwalk
Bronze medal – third place	2008 Cheboksary	20 km teamwalk
Bronze medal – third place	2010 Chihuahua	50 km walk
Bronze medal – third place	2014 Taicang	50 km walk

Jared Tallent (born 17 October 1984) is an Australian race walker and Olympic gold medallist in the 50 km walk from London in 2012. He is a four-time Olympic medallist, three-time World Championship medallist and holds the current Olympic record in the 50 km walk.

== Personal life ==
Tallent was born on 17 October 1984 in Ballarat, Victoria. He is one of six children and his parents own a potato farm near Ballarat. Tallent attended Dean Primary School and Ballarat High School. He married race walker Claire Woods in Walkerville, South Australia in August 2008. They welcomed their first son, Harvey Sebastian Tallent, into the world on 25 May 2017.

== Athletics career ==
Tallent finished third in the 20 km walk at the 2008 Olympic Games in Beijing to claim his first Olympic medal. He received a silver medal for finishing second in the 50 km walk a week later, becoming the first Australian to win two athletic medals in the same Olympics since 1972 and the first male Australian to do so in 102 years. In the 20 km walk and 50 km walk at the 2009 World Championships in Athletics, he finished in sixth and seventh position respectively. Tallent returned to the medal dais in 2010 when claiming a bronze medal in the 50 km Walk at the 24th World Race Walking Cup held in Chihuahua, Mexico. Later on that year Tallent took home gold in the 20 km walk at the 2010 Delhi Commonwealth Games.

He opened his 2011 season with a win at the Australian 20 km walk championships, while his wife Claire Tallent secured the women's title. At the 2011 IAAF World Athletics Championships, he won the bronze medal in the Men's 50 km walk. On 24 March 2016, original gold medalist Sergey Bakulin had his results disqualified for doping, advancing Tallent's medal to silver. Also advancing his medal was Denis Nizhegorodov, whose A sample also tested positive. Nizhegorodov was fortunate his B sample could not confirm doping and he retains the medal.

At the 2012 London Olympics, Tallent finished 7th in the 20 km walk. A week later he won the gold medal in the 50 km walk in a personal best time and Olympic Record of 3:36:53. Tallent was initially awarded the silver medal, but on 24 March 2016 the Court of Arbitration for Sport disqualified all results, in the period from 20 August 2009 to 15 October 2012, of doper Sergey Kirdyapkin, who had been the first walker across the line. Tallent received his gold medal for the 2012 Olympics on 17 June 2016 in a special ceremony held in Melbourne.

Tallent won the bronze medal in the Men's 50 km walk at the 2013 IAAF World Athletics Championships in Moscow, Russia. It was his second world championships medal. In 2015, Tallent won his third World Championships medal with silver in the 50 km walk at the 2015 IAAF World Championships in Beijing, China.

At the 2016 IAAF World Race Walking Cup in Rome, Italy, Tallent was initially awarded the silver medal behind Alex Schwazer, the 2008 Olympic gold medallist who had just returned from a four-year doping ban. However, in August 2016 the Court of Arbitration for Sport disqualified Schwazer from 1 January 2016, due to him yet again failing a drug test and Tallent was retrospectively awarded the gold medal.

At the 2016 Rio Olympics, he won the silver medal in the Men's 50 km walk. As a result of winning four Olympic medals, he became Australia's most prolific Olympic male track and field medallist.

Tallent withdrew from the 50 km walk at the 2017 World Championships in Athletics due to a hamstring injury.

Tallent announced his retirement in March 2021 after failing to overcome a hamstring injury before the 2021 Australian Olympic selection trials.

He was coached by Brent Vallance at the Australian Institute of Sport in Canberra between 2004 and 2012.

== Achievements ==
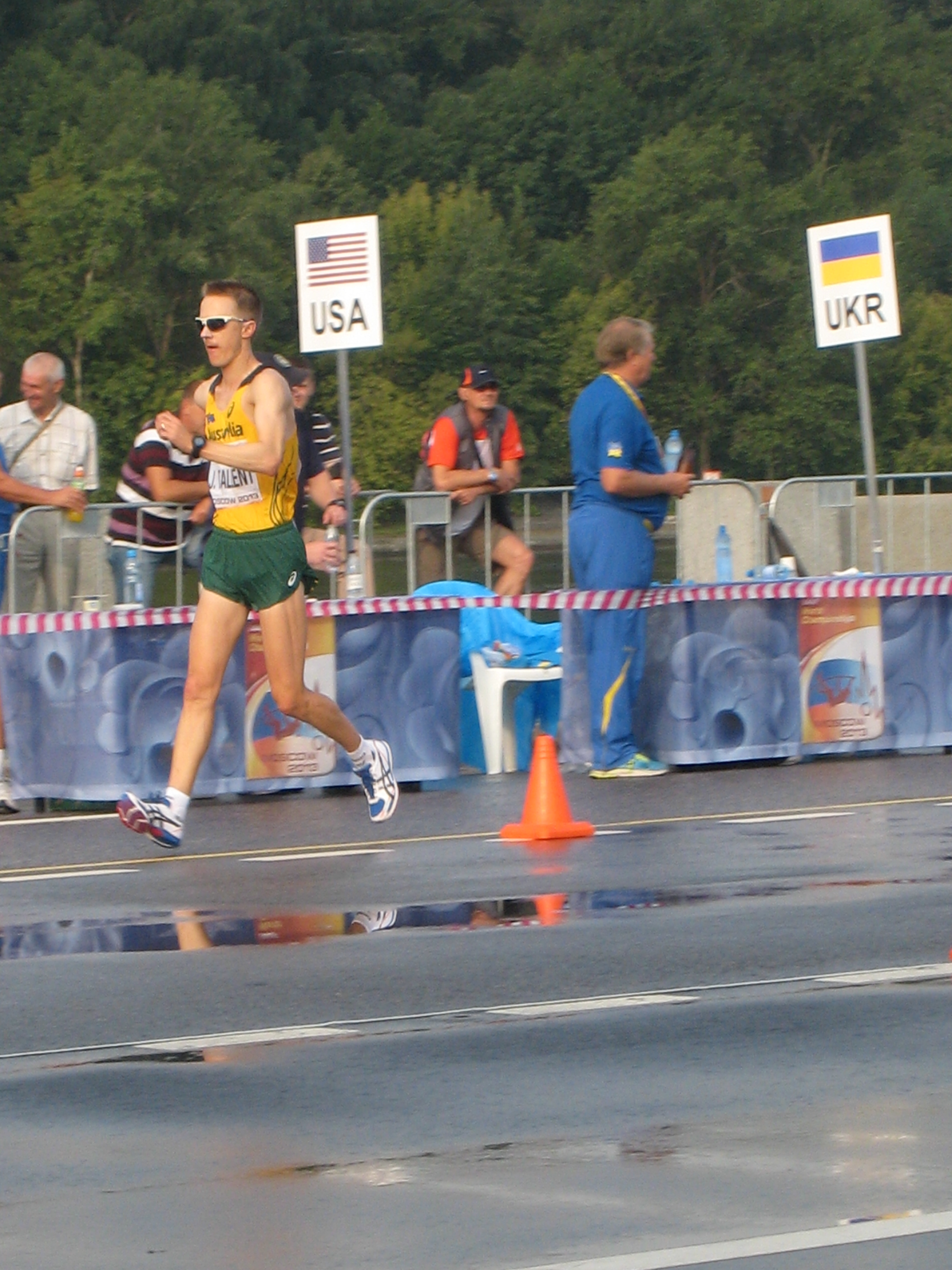
Jared at the 2013 World Championships in Moscow, 50 km walk race

Year	Competition	Venue	Position	Event	Notes
Representing Australia
2001	World Youth Championships	Debrecen, Hungary	7th	10,000 m	44:50.94
2002	World Junior Championships	Kingston, Jamaica	19th	10,000 m	45:41.19
2004	World Race Walking Cup	Naumburg, Germany	75th	20 km	1:30:01
2005	World Championships	Helsinki, Finland	18th	20 km	1:23:42
2006	Commonwealth Games	Melbourne, Australia	3rd	20 km	1:23:32
2006	World Race Walking Cup	A Coruña, Spain	14th	20 km	1:21:36
2007	World Championships	Osaka, Japan	—	20 km	DSQ
2008	World Race Walking Cup	Cheboksary, Russia	10th	20 km	1:19:48
2008	Olympic Games	Beijing, China	3rd	20 km	1:19:42
2008	Olympic Games	Beijing, China	2nd	50 km	3:39:27
2009	World Championships	Berlin, Germany	6th	20 km	1:20:27
2009	World Championships	Berlin, Germany	7th	50 km	3:44:50
2010	World Race Walking Cup	Chihuahua, Mexico	3rd	50 km	3:54:55
2010	Commonwealth Games	Delhi, India	1st	20 km	1:22:18
2011	World Championships	Daegu, South Korea	2nd	50 km	3:43:36
2012	World Race Walking Cup	Saransk, Russia	1st	50 km	3:40:32
2012	Olympic Games	London, United Kingdom	7th	20 km	1:20:02
2012	Olympic Games	London, United Kingdom	1st	50 km	3:36:53 OR
2013	World Championships	Moscow, Russia	3rd	50 km	3:40:03
2014	World Race Walking Cup	Taicang, China	3rd	50 km	3:42:48
2015	World Championships	Beijing, China	26th	20 km	1:24:19
2015	World Championships	Beijing, China	2nd	50 km	3:42:17
2016	World Race Walking Cup	Rome, Italy	1st	50 km	3:42:36
2016	Olympic Games	Rio de Janeiro, Brazil	2nd	50 km	3:41:16

== 2016 Olympic gold medal presentation ==
Tallent originally finished second in the 50 km walk at the 2012 London Olympics. In March 2016, Court of Arbitration for Sport stripped London gold medallist Sergey Kirdyapkin of all his results for the period of 20 August 2009 to 15 October 2012 for doping. Tallent was then awarded the gold medal. On 17 June 2016, 1460 days after his London 50 km race, Tallent was presented his gold medal on steps of the Victorian Parliament and this ceremony followed International Olympic Committee protocol with Australian Olympic Committee President John Coates presenting him the gold medal, Athletics Australia President Mark Arbib presenting a bunch of flowers and the national anthem being played whilst the Australian flag was raised. Tallent made the following comments when interviewed during the ceremony:

When I was a kid growing up in Ballarat, I was always inspired by the Olympic Games. To be able to go to the Olympics and win a gold medal is beyond my wildest dreams. And to get the gold medal here, so close, and the first one awarded in Melbourne since the 1956 Games, makes it so special. I just want to celebrate today. Let's enjoy the moment. We now move to eighth on the medal tally in London

—

== 2018 IAAF gold medal presentation ==
In May 2018 at an IAAF ceremony in Taicang, China, Tallent was awarded two gold medals from the 2012 and 2016 IAAF World Race Walking Team Championships 50-kilometre race walk, following the confirmed positive doping test of the 2016 first-placed race walker Alex Schwazer (ITA) and a previously confirmed series of abnormalities in the Athlete Biological Passport profile of 2012 first-placed Sergey Kirdyapkin (RUS) and second-placed Igor Erokhin (RUS).

== Recognition ==
- 2009 and 2010 - Athletics Australia "Out of Stadium" athlete award
- 2012 - Australian Flame Athlete of The Year
- 2016 - Order of Australia
- 2016 - Australian Flame Male Athlete of The Year
