= Ganapathi Krishnan =

Indian racewalker

Personal information
- Nationality: Indian
- Born: 24 June 1989 (age 37)

Sport
- Country: India
- Sport: Racewalking

Ganapathi Krishnan (born 24 June 1989) is an Indian racewalker from Kone Goundanur, a village in Krishnagiri district of Tamil Nadu state, India.

He was selected to represent India at the 2016 Summer Olympics in Rio de Janeiro, in the men's 20 kilometres walk.
