= Athletics at the 2006 Commonwealth Games – Men's 20 kilometres walk =

Men's 20 kilometres walk at the Commonwealth Games

The men's 20 kilometres walk event at the 2006 Commonwealth Games was held on March 20.

== Results ==
Rank	Name	Nationality	Time	Notes
1st place, gold medalist(s)	Nathan Deakes	Australia	1:19:55	GR
2nd place, silver medalist(s)	Luke Adams	Australia	1:21:38	
3rd place, bronze medalist(s)	Jared Tallent	Australia	1:23:32	
4	David Kimutai	Kenya	1:25:42	
5	Parayil Jalan	India	1:30:43	
6	Daniel King	England	1:31:17	
7	Dominic King	England	1:32:21	
8	Andrew Penn	England	1:32:54	
	Mohd Sharrulhaizy Abdul Rahman	Malaysia	DQ	
	Dip Chand	Fiji	DNF	
