= Vladimir Stankin =

Russian racewalker

Personal information
- Born: 2 January 1974 (age 52)

Sport
- Sport: Race walking

Vladimir Stankin (born 2 January 1974) is a Russian race walker.

== Achievements ==
Year	Competition	Venue	Position	Event	Notes
Representing the Commonwealth of Independent States
1992	World Junior Championships	Seoul, South Korea	—	10,000m	DQ
Representing Russia
2000	European Race Walking Cup	Eisenhüttenstadt, Germany	44th	20 km	1:28:25
2004	World Race Walking Cup	Naumburg, Germany	11th	20 km	
2005	European Race Walking Cup	Miskolc, Hungary	3rd	20 km	1:21:28
2005	World Championships	Helsinki, Finland	6th	20 km	1:20:25
