= 2003 Asian Athletics Championships – Men's 20 kilometres walk =

The men's 20 kilometres walk event at the 2003 Asian Athletics Championships was held in Manila, Philippines on September 22.

== Results ==
Rank	Name	Nationality	Time	Notes
1st place, gold medalist(s)	Han Yucheng	China	1:21:12	
2nd place, silver medalist(s)	Yuki Yamazaki	Japan	1:21:54	
3rd place, bronze medalist(s)	Bai Liansheng	China	1:22:14	
4	Akihiro Sugimoto	Japan	1:22:36	SB
5	Sakchai Samutkao	Thailand	1:29:40	NR
6	Mohd Sharrulhaizy Abdul Rahman	Malaysia	1:30:09	SB
7	Amir Khairgorazlighi	Iran	1:36:12	NJR
