= 2005 Asian Athletics Championships – Men's 20 kilometres walk =

The men's 20 kilometres walk event at the 2005 Asian Athletics Championships was held in Incheon, South Korea on September 2.

== Results ==
Rank	Name	Nationality	Time	Notes
1st place, gold medalist(s)	Lu Ronghua	China	1:25:30	
2nd place, silver medalist(s)	Kim Hyun-sub	South Korea	1:25:41	
3rd place, bronze medalist(s)	Zhang Hong	China	1:27:14	
4	Yusuke Yachi	Japan	1:27:43	
5	Akinori Matsuzaki	Japan	1:31:02	
6	Mohd Sharrulhaizy Abdul Rahman	Malaysia	1:32:21	SB
7	Lee Dae-Ro	South Korea	1:33:35	
