= 1992 World Junior Championships in Athletics – Men's 10,000 metres walk =

The men's 10,000 metres walk event at the 1992 World Junior Championships in Athletics was held in Seoul, South Korea, at Olympic Stadium on 16 September.

== Medalists ==
Gold	Jefferson Pérez; Ecuador
Silver	Jacek Müller; Poland
Bronze	Grzegorz Müller; Poland

== Results ==
=== Final ===
16 September

Rank	Name	Nationality	Time	Notes
1st place, gold medalist(s)	Jefferson Pérez	Ecuador	40:42.66	
2nd place, silver medalist(s)	Jacek Müller	Poland	40:50.82	
3rd place, bronze medalist(s)	Grzegorz Müller	Poland	41:12.28	
4	Benjamin Leroy	Belgium	41:22.77	
5	Dmitriy Yesipchuk	Commonwealth of Independent States	41:34.25	
6	Michele Didoni	Italy	41:42.75	
7	Daisuke Ikeshima	Japan	41:45.18	
8	Claus Jørgensen	Denmark	41:57.48	
9	Heiko Valentin	Germany	42:08.07	
10	Steffen Borsch	Germany	42:58.36	
11	Béla Breznai	Hungary	43:33.87	
12	Hugo López	Guatemala	43:35.54	
13	Mohamed El-Mimouni	Morocco	44:53.02	
14	Dion Russell	Australia	45:01.24	
15	Kentaro Fujii	Japan	45:09.76	
16	David Cullinan	Ireland	45:23.85	
17	Daniel Andrikis	Australia	45:29.57	
18	Tobias Persson	Sweden	46:20.08	
	Greg Cross	New Zealand	DQ	
	Vladimir Stankin	Commonwealth of Independent States	DQ	
	Julio René Martínez	Guatemala	DQ	
	Alejandro López	Mexico	DQ	

== Participation ==
According to an unofficial count, 22 athletes from 16 countries participated in the event.

- Australia (2)
- Belgium (1)
- Commonwealth of Independent States (2)
- Denmark (1)
- Ecuador (1)
- Germany (2)
- Guatemala (2)
- Hungary (1)
- Ireland (1)
- Italy (1)
- Japan (2)
- Mexico (1)
- Morocco (1)
- New Zealand (1)
- Poland (2)
- Sweden (1)
