= Ken Akashi =

Japanese race walker (born 1976

Ken Akashi (Japanese: 明石 顕; born 6 November 1976 in Tokyo) is a Japanese race walker.

== Achievements ==
Year	Competition	Venue	Position	Notes
Representing Japan
2005	World Championships	Helsinki, Finland	15th	50 km
2007	World Championships	Osaka, Japan	16th	50 km
