= Gurmeet Singh (race walker) =

Indian racewalker (born 1985)

Personal information
- Born: 1 July 1985 (age 41) Udham Singh Nagar, Uttarakhand, India
- Height: 1.72 m (5 ft 8 in)

Sport
- Sport: Athletics
- Event: 20 km race walk

Achievements and titles
- Personal bests: 1:20:29 (Nomi, 2016)
Medal record
Men's athletics
Representing India
Asian Race Walking Championships
Gold medal – first place	2016 Nomi	20km walk
Silver medal – second place	2012 Nomi	20km walk
Bronze medal – third place	2013 Nomi	20km walk
Bronze medal – third place	2014 Nomi	20km walk

Gurmeet Singh (born 1 July 1985) is an Indian former athlete who specialized in the 20 km race walk event. Singh has represented India in the 20 km race walk event at the 2012 and 2016 Olympic Games. He currently serves as a coach at the Sports Authority of India, Bengaluru.

== Early and personal life ==
Singh was born in a small village in the Udham Singh Nagar district in Uttarakhand. He considers his cousin Surjit Singh, who was a discus thrower, his inspiration for choosing athletics.

Singh is married to Deepmala Devi, also a 20 km race walker.

== Career ==
Singh won a silver in the National Junior Championships in 2000. He finished fifth in the 2001 Asian Junior Athletics Championships in Brunei.

His career turned around in late 2010, when he started training at Sports Authority of India, Bengaluru centre under the coach Ramakrishnan Gandhi.

In March 2012, he walked a time of 1:21:31 at the Asian Race Walking Championships in Nomi, Japan. He was one of the three Indian athletes who qualified for the 2012 London Olympics in 20 km race walk event with an 'A' qualification standard (1:22:30). He achieved this berth in the 18th Dublin International Grand Prix in Ireland after finishing sixth with a time of 1:22:05.

In March 2016, he clinched a gold medal in the Asian Race Walking Championships finishing in 1:20:29. He also participated in the 20 km race walk event at the 2016 Rio Olympics.
