= Isamu Fujisawa =

Japanese racewalker (born 1987)

Isamu Fujisawa (藤澤 勇, Fujisawa Isamu; born 12 October 1987, in Nakano) is a Japanese racewalker. He competed in the 20 km walk at the 2012 Summer Olympics, where he placed 18th. He was also part of Japan's 20 km team at the 2016 Summer Olympics. He competed at the 2009 and 2015 World Championships.
