= Zhu Hongjun =

Chinese race walker (born 1981)

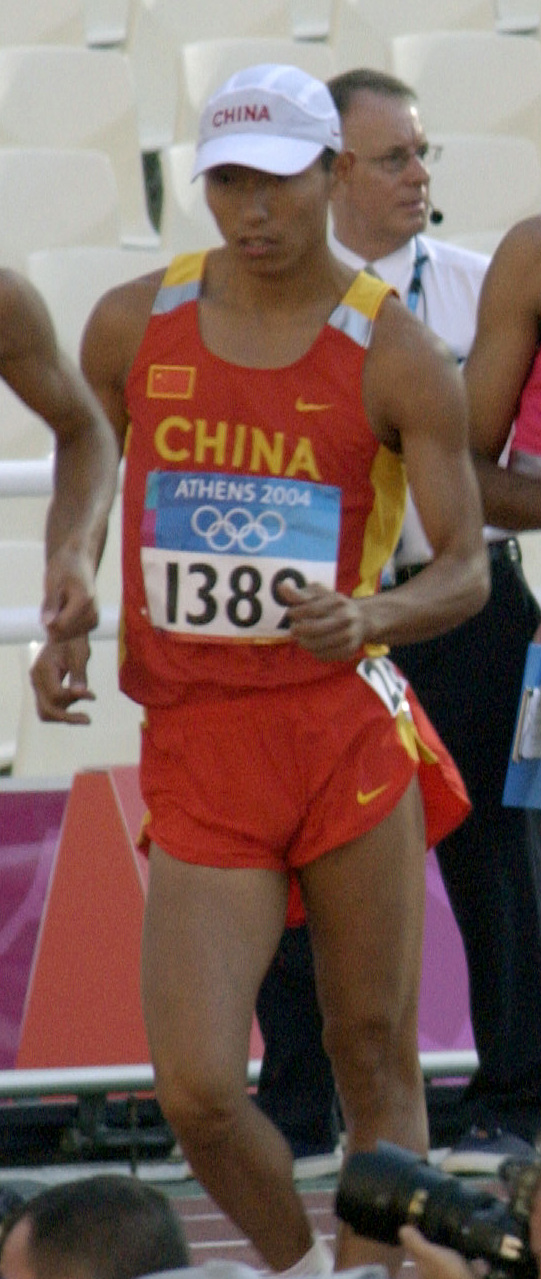
Zhu Hongjun in 2004

Zhu Hongjun (simplified Chinese: 朱红军; traditional Chinese: 朱紅軍; pinyin: Zhū Hóngjūn; born August 18, 1981, in Liaoning) is a Chinese race walker.

== Achievements ==
Year	Competition	Venue	Position	Event	Notes
Representing China
2004	Olympic Games	Athens, Greece	6th	20 km	
2005	World Championships	Helsinki, Finland	9th	20 km	
