= Luke Adams (race walker) =

Australian race walker (born 1976)

Personal information
- Born: 22 October 1976 (age 49) Dodoma, Tanzania
- Height: 1.89 m (6 ft 2 1/2 in)
- Weight: 70 kg (150 lb)

Sport
- Country: Australia
- Sport: Athletics
- Event(s): 50km race walk 20km race walk
Medal record
Commonwealth Games
Silver medal – second place	2002 Manchester	20 km walk
Silver medal – second place	2006 Melbourne	20 km walk
Silver medal – second place	2010 New Delhi	20 km walk

Luke Kendall Adams (born 22 October 1976) is an Australian former race walker. He was born in Tanzania, where his parents worked as medical missionaries. He is a three-time Olympian for Australia. On 23 June 2000, he was awarded the Australian Sports Medal.

== Achievements ==
Year	Competition	Venue	Position	Event	Notes
Representing Australia
1994	World Junior Championships	Lisbon, Portugal	24th	10,000m	44:09.59
1999	World Race Walking Cup	Mézidon-Canon, France	55th	20 km	1:30:11
2002	World Race Walking Cup	Turin, Italy	29th	50 km	4:07:08
2002	Commonwealth Games	Manchester, United Kingdom	2nd	20 km	1:26:03
2003	World Championships	Paris, France	5th	20 km	1:19:35
2004	Olympic Games	Athens, Greece	16th	20 km	1:23:52
2004	World Race Walking Cup	Naumburg, Germany	14th	20 km	1:21:24
2005	World Championships	Helsinki, Finland	10th	20 km	1:21:43
2006	Commonwealth Games	Melbourne, Australia	2nd	20 km	1:21:38
2006	World Race Walking Cup	A Coruña, Spain	18th	20 km	1:22:11
2007	World Championships	Osaka, Japan	7th	20 km	1:23:52
2008	Olympic Games	Beijing, China	6th	20 km	1:19:57
2008	Olympic Games	Beijing, China	10th	50 km	3:47:45
2009	World Championships	Berlin, Germany	18th	20 km	1:22:37
2009	World Championships	Berlin, Germany	5th	50 km	3:43:39
2010	World Race Walking Cup	Chihuahua, Mexico	—	50 km	DNF
2010	Commonwealth Games	Delhi, India	2nd	20 km	1:22:31
2011	World Championships	Daegu, South Korea	5th	50 km	3:45:31
2012	Olympic Games	London, United Kingdom	25th	50 km	3:53:41
