= Yuki Yamazaki (race walker) =

Japanese racewalker

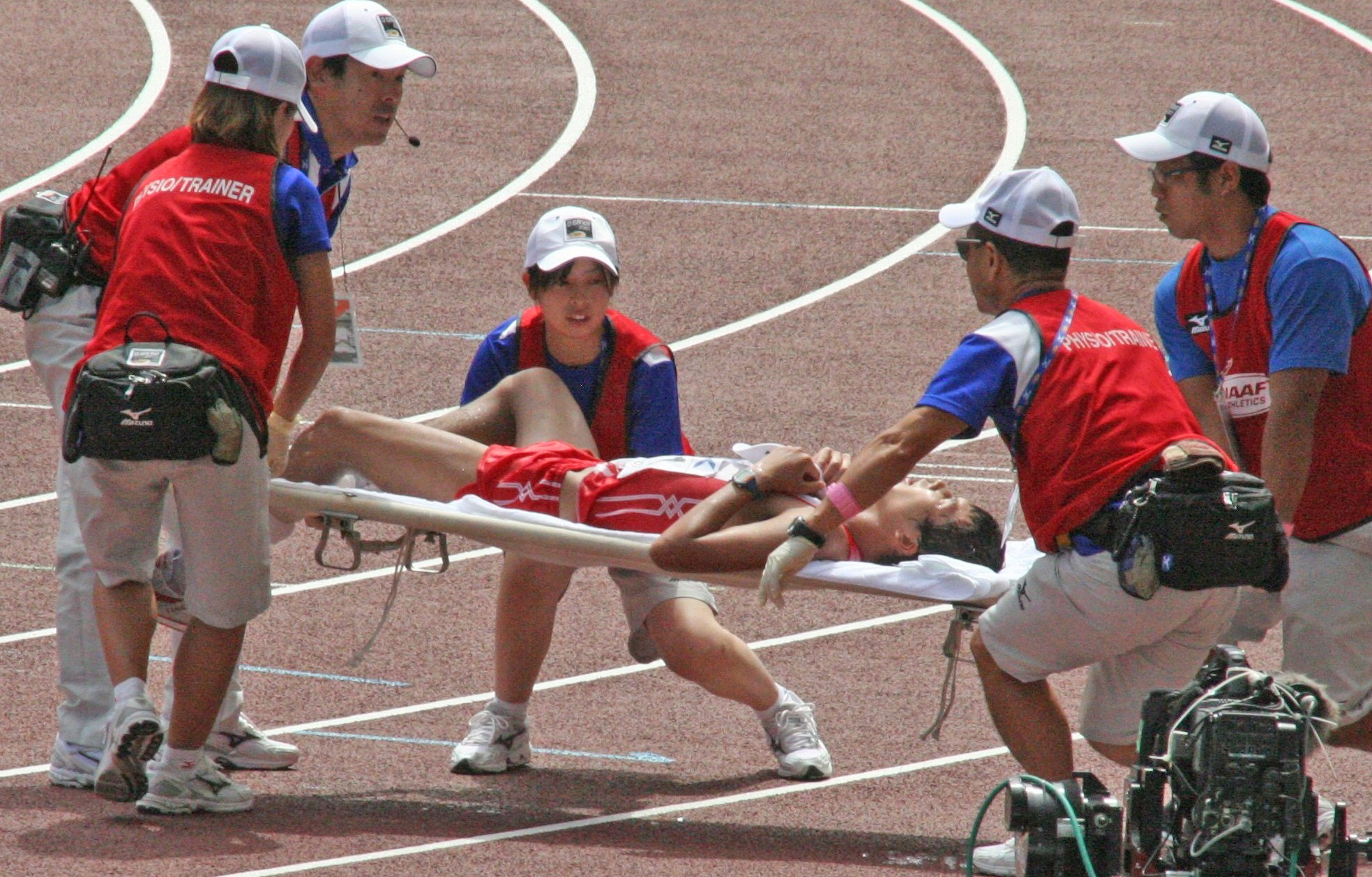
- 2007 World Athletics Championships in Osaka. Yamazaki is carried away after finishing the 50km race. He came in 5th but was disqualified.

Personal information
- Born: 16 January 1984 (age 42)
- Height: 1.79 m (5 ft 10 in)
- Weight: 63 kg (139 lb)

Sport
- Country: Japan
- Sport: Athletics
- Event: 50 kilometres race walk
Medal record
Men's athletics
Representing Japan
Asian Championships
Silver medal – second place	2003 Manila	20 km walk

Yuki Yamazaki (山崎 勇喜, Yamazaki Yūki; born 16 January 1984 in Toyama) is a Japanese race walker.

Yamazaki began to participate in race walking at high school, and competed at the World Junior championships in his junior year.

At the Osaka World Championships in 2007, he was in contention in the 50 km race until he was misdirected by officials and disqualified for entering the stadium without completing the full course. If he had finished in the top eight, he would have qualified for the 2008 Summer Olympics. He managed to qualify for the 2008 Olympics after setting a new Japanese record at the Japanese national championships.

== International competitions ==
Representing Japan
Year	Competition	Venue	Position	Event	Notes
2000	World Junior Championships	Santiago, Chile	20th	10,000m walk	45:19.21
2002	World Junior Championships	Kingston, Jamaica	5th	10,000 m	42:02.76
2003	Asian Championships	Manila, Philippines	2nd	20 km	1:21:54
2004	Olympic Games	Athens, Greece	—	20 km	DNF
2004	Olympic Games	Athens, Greece	16th	50 km	3:57:00
2005	World Championships	Helsinki, Finland	8th	50 km	3:51:15
2007	World Championships	Osaka, Japan	—	50 km	DNF
2008	Olympic Games	Beijing, China	11th	20 km	1:21:18
2008	Olympic Games	Beijing, China	7th	50 km	3:45:47
2009	World Championships	Berlin, Germany	—	50 km	DQ
2010	World Race Walking Cup	Chihuahua, Mexico	6th	50 km	3:55:44
2012	World Race Walking Cup	Saransk, Russia	25th	20 km	1:23:19
2012	Olympic Games	London, United Kingdom	–	50 km	DQ
2015	World Championships	Beijing, China	34th	50 km	4:03:54
