= Sergey Kirdyapkin =

Russian race walker (born 1980)

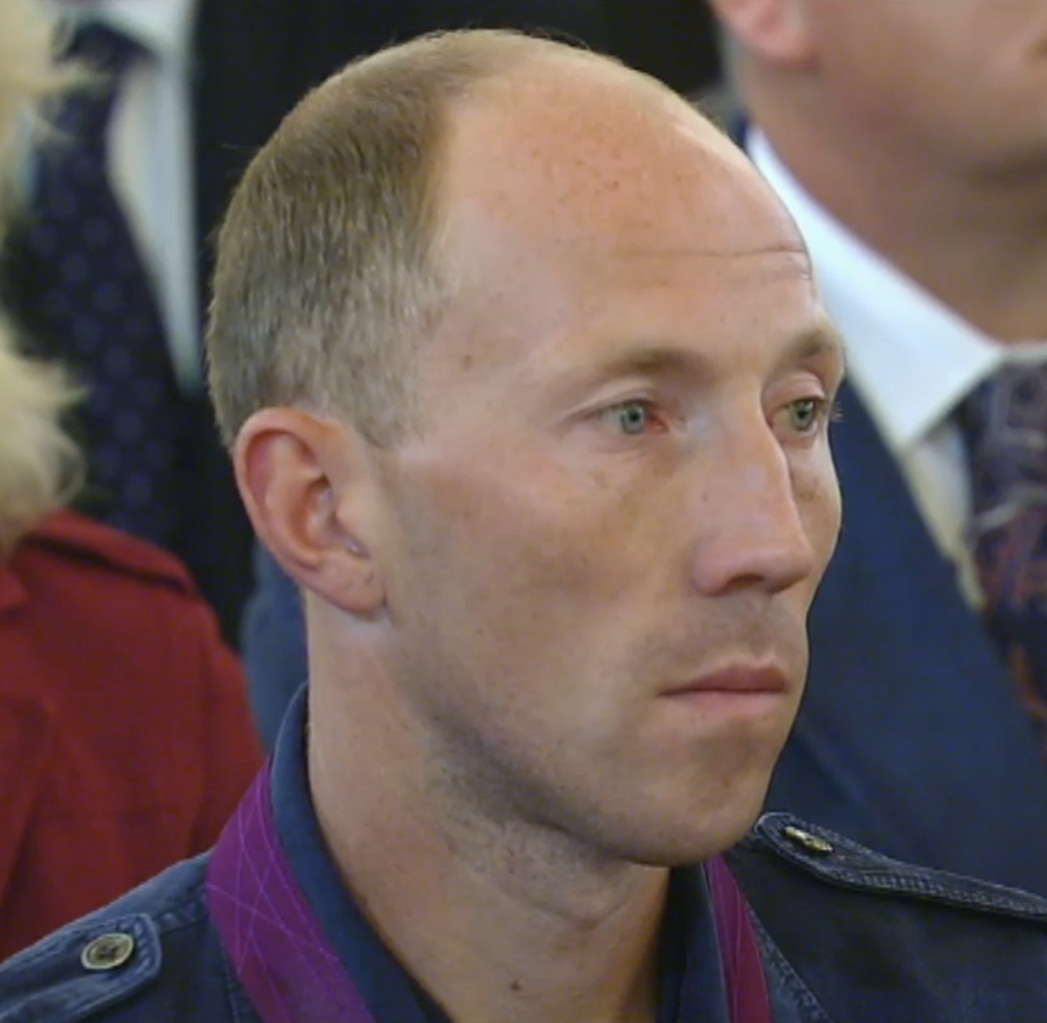
- Sergey Kirdyapkin at the meetion of Russian 2012 Summer Olympics medalists with the President of Russia on August 16, 2012

Personal information
- Born: 16 January 1980 (age 46)
- Height: 1.77 m (5 ft 9 1/2 in)
- Weight: 54 kg (119 lb)

Sport
- Country: Russia
- Sport: Athletics
- Event: 50 km Race Walk
Medal record
Olympic Games
Disqualified	2012 London	50 km walk
World Championships
Gold medal – first place	2005 Helsinki	50 km walk
Disqualified	2009 Berlin	50 km walk
World Race Walking Cup
Disqualified	2012 Saransk	50 km walk

Sergey Alexandrovich Kirdyapkin (Russian: Серге́й Алекса́ндрович Кирдя́пкин; born 18 June 1980, in Insar, Mordovia) is a Russian race walker.

== Career ==
Kirdyapkin originally won the gold medal in the 50 km walk at the 2012 London Olympics with an Olympic record time 3:35:59.

He also won two gold medals in the 50 km walk at the 2005 World Championships in a personal best time of 3:38:08 hours and at the 2009 World Championships, finishing in 3:38:35, his second fastest ever time.

He is coached by Viktor Chegin, who also coaches racewalk world champions Valeriy Borchin and Olga Kaniskina.

=== Disqualification ===
Kirdyapkin was stripped of the 2012 Olympic gold medal in the 50 km walk, by decision of the Court of Arbitration published 24 March 2016, due to doping violations. Due to these doping violations, he was given a three-year-and-two-month ban from athletic competition, backdated to 15 October 2012, allowing him time to still qualify for the 2016 Summer Olympics. However, Russia did not compete in athletics at the 2016 Olympics, due to the suspension of the governing body, the IAAF, due to widespread doping.

Kirdyapkin's coach, Viktor Chegin, has been embroiled in doping controversy during his whole career and this has passed much suspicion onto Kirdyapkin. Chegin has coached no less than 30 athletes that have failed doping tests. On 20 January 2015 Kirdyapkin was disqualified for 3 years and 2 months starting from 15 October 2012, and all his results between 20 July 2009 and 20 September 2009, between 29 June 2010 and 29 August 2011, as well as between 17 December 2011 and 11 June 2012 (which include a world championship gold) were annulled.

On March 25, 2015, the IAAF filed an appeal with the Court of Arbitration in Lausanne, Switzerland, suggesting inappropriate selective disqualification periods were attributed by RUSADA, which alludes to but is not specified in the public announcement, the strange gap between Kirdyapkin's suspension dates allowing him to keep his Olympic gold medal. As of April 16, the IAAF have not changed the results of the World Cup victory, which would fall under the existing RUSADA suspension period.

== Personal life ==
Kirdyapkin is married to fellow racewalker Anisya Kirdyapkina.

== Achievements ==
Year	Competition	Venue	Position	Event	Notes
Representing Russia
2005	European Race Walking Cup	Miskolc, Hungary	2nd	50 km	3:41:11
2005	European Race Walking Cup	Miskolc, Hungary	1st	Team - 50 km	6 pts
2005	World Championships	Helsinki, Finland	1st	50 km	3:38:08
2006	World Race Walking Cup	A Coruña, Spain	49th	50 km	4:23:27
2007	World Championships	Osaka, Japan	—	50 km	DNF
2008	World Race Walking Cup	Cheboksary, Russia	6th	50 km	3:48:29
2008	Olympic Games	Beijing, China	—	50 km	DNF
2009	European Race Walking Cup	Metz, France	DSQ	50 km	DNF
2009	World Championships	Berlin, Germany	DSQ	50 km	3:38:35
2010	European Championships	Barcelona, Spain	DSQ	50 km	DNF
2011	World Championships	Daegu, South Korea	DSQ	50 km	DNF
2012	World Race Walking Cup	Saransk, Russia	DSQ	50 km	3:38:08
2012	Olympic Games	London, United Kingdom	DSQ	50 km	3:35:59

- Following the decision of the Court of Arbitration for Sport, published 24 March 2016, IAAF have indicated that in addition to immediately stripping Kirdyapkin of results under their control, they have also instructed the IOC to strip him of his result in the Olympic Games. As such Jared Tallent becomes the 2012 Olympic champion.
