= Kumi Otoshi =

Japanese racewalker

Kumi Otoshi (大利 久美, Ōtoshi Kumi; born 29 July 1985 in Kita, Tokyo) is a Japanese race walker. She competed in the 20 km kilometres event at the 2012 Summer Olympics.

Otoshi has been highly successful at the Asian Race Walking Championships. Her first appearance was in 2006, when she placed seventh, and she improved to fourth in 2007. She was the Asian 20 km runner-up in 2009 and 2010 and followed this with Asian title wins in 2011 and 2013.

She placed fourth at the 2007 Summer Universiade and came twelfth at the 2009 World Championships in Athletics. Otoshi was the silver medallist behind Li Yanfei at the 2009 East Asian Games. In her second global appearance she came 22nd at the 2010 IAAF World Race Walking Cup. She figured in the top twenty at the 2011 World Championships in Athletics, although her 19th-place finish was not improvement on her 2009 performance. She was one place higher at the 2012 IAAF World Race Walking Cup.
