= Yang Yongjian =

Chinese race walker

Yang Yongjian (simplified Chinese: 杨永健; traditional Chinese: 楊永健; pinyin: Yáng Yǒngjiàn; born April 28, 1973) is a male Chinese race walker.

== Achievements ==
Year	Competition	Venue	Position	Event	Notes
Representing China
1999	World Championships	Seville, Spain	8th	50 km	
2000	Olympic Games	Sydney, Australia	10th	50 km	
