= Yusuke Yachi =

Japanese racewalker

Personal information
- Nationality: Japanese
- Born: 2 January 1980 (age 46)

Sport
- Sport: Athletics
- Event: Race walking

Yusuke Yachi (Japanese: 谷内 雄亮; born 2 January 1980) is a Japanese race walker.

He finished seventeenth at the 2007 World Championships in Osaka, in his major international debut race.

== Achievements ==
Year	Competition	Venue	Position	Event	Notes
Representing Japan
2005	Japanese National Games	Okayama, Japan	1st	10,000 m	
2005	Asian Championships	Incheon, South Korea	4th	20 km	1:27:43
2007	World Championships	Osaka, Japan	17th	50 km	4:05:21
