= Sandro Donati =

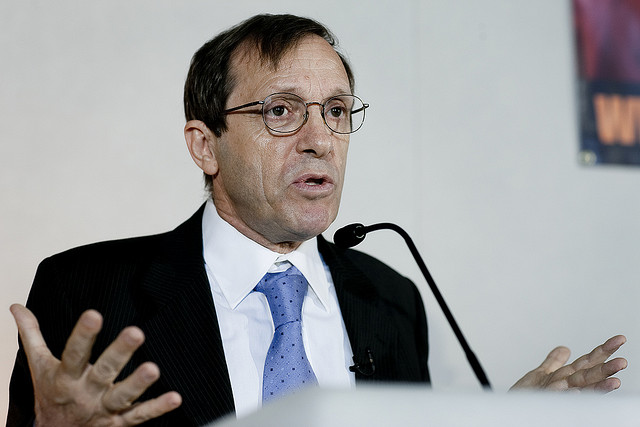
- Sandro Donati in 2009

Personal information
- Nationality: Italian
- Born: 14 June 1947 (age 77); Monte Porzio Catone, Italy

Sport
- Country: Italy
- Sport: Athletics
- Event: Running

Sandro Donati (Monte Porzio Catone, 14 June 1947) is an Italian athletics coach and antidoping activist.

== Biography ==
He is mostly known for his battle against doping in athletics, soccer, and cycling and for denouncing Italian athletics scandals in the mid-1980s.

He coached the Italy national athletics sprint team from 1977 to 1987, but was dismissed after denouncing the rigged jump of Giovanni Evangelisti at the 1987 World Championships in Athletics held in Rome. Author of several books about doping, he was Head of Research and Experimentation of Italian National Olympic Committee from 1990 to 2006. In 1999, after Lance Armstrong's first Tour de France victory, Donati assisted The Sunday Times journalist David Walsh in his pursuit of a connection between Armstrong and the infamous "doping doctor", Michele Ferrari.

He trained Alex Schwazer during his bid to return to the Olympics after his disqualification for doping. Schwazer qualified for the 2016 Summer Olympics, however he never competed as he was found positive to doping for a second time. Donati believes a conspiracy was enacted to punish him and Schwazer for their whistleblowing against state sponsored doping.

== Books ==
- Donati, Sandro (1983). L'organizzazione dell'allenamento. Rome: Società stampa sportiva.
- Donati, Sandro (1989). Campioni senza valore. Florence: Ponte alle Grazie.
- Donati, Sandro (2012). Lo sport del doping. Chi lo subisce, chi lo combatte. Rome: EGA-Edizioni Gruppo Abele. ISBN 978-8865790335.
