= Xing Shucai =

Chinese racewalker

Xing Shucai (born 4 August 1984) is a Chinese race walker.

Born in Yunnan, he finished fourteenth in the 50 kilometres (31 mi) distance at the 2004 World Race Walking Cup. He also competed at the 2005 World Championships, where he did not finish, and the 2006 World Race Walking Cup.
