= Xu Xingde =

Chinese race walker (born 1984)

Xu Xingde (simplified Chinese: 许兴德; traditional Chinese: 許興德; pinyin: Xǔ Xìngdé; born 12 June 1984 in Yunnan) is a Chinese race walker.

He won the silver medal at the 2002 World Junior Championships and finished ninth in the 20 km distance at the 2004 World Race Walking Cup. He also competed at the 2003 World Championships.
