= Yu Chaohong =

Chinese race walker

Personal information
- Nationality: Chinese
- Born: November 3, 1975 (age 50) Yunnan, China

Sport
- Sport: Athletics
- Event: Race walking

Yu Chaohong (simplified Chinese: 虞朝鸿; traditional Chinese: 虞朝鴻; pinyin: Yú Cháohóng; born November 3, 1975, in Yunnan) is a Chinese race walker.

== Achievements ==
Year	Competition	Venue	Position	Event	Notes
Representing China
1999	World Race Walking Cup	Mézidon-Canon, France	11th	20 km	
2002	Asian Games	Busan, South Korea	2nd	20 km	
2003	World Championships	Paris, France	15th	20 km	
2003	World Championships	Paris, France	—	50 km	DSQ
2004	Olympic Games	Athens, Greece	4th	50 km	
2004	World Race Walking Cup	Naumburg, Germany	2nd	50 km	
2005	World Championships	Helsinki, Finland	—	20 km	DSQ
2006	World Race Walking Cup	A Coruña, Spain	11th	50 km	
2007	World Championships	Osaka, Japan	—	50 km	DSQ
