= Han Yucheng =

Chinese racewalker (born 1978)

Medal record

Men's athletics

Representing China

Asian Championships
Gold medal – first place	2003 Manila	20 km walk

Han Yucheng (born 16 December 1978 in Liaoning) is a Chinese race walker. He competed at the 20 km race walk event at the 2004 Summer Olympics.

== Achievements ==
Year	Competition	Venue	Position	Notes
Representing China
2003	Asian Championships	Manila, Philippines	1st	20 km
2004	World Race Walking Cup	Naumburg, Germany	4th	20 km
2004	Olympic Games	Athens, Greece	40th	20 km
2004	Olympic Games	Athens, Greece	DNF	50 km
2005	World Championships	Helsinki, Finland	DNF	50 km
2006	World Race Walking Cup	A Coruña, Spain	3rd	20 km
2006	Asian Games	Doha, Qatar	1st	20 km
2007	World Championships	Osaka, Japan	29th	20 km
