= Zhao Chengliang =

Chinese race walker

Zhao Chengliang (Chinese: 赵成亮; pinyin: Zhào Chéngliàng; born 1 June 1984 in Qujing) is a Chinese race walker. Zhao won the 50 km walk event at the 11th Chinese National Games in 2009.

== Achievements ==
Year	Competition	Venue	Position	Event	Notes
Representing China
2004	World Race Walking Cup	Naumburg, Germany	19th	50 km	
2005	World Championships	Helsinki, Finland	5th	50 km	
2006	World Race Walking Cup	A Coruña, Spain	8th	50 km	
2007	World Championships	Osaka, Japan	—	50 km	DSQ
2008	Olympic Games	Beijing, PR China	21st	50 km	3:56:47
2009	World Championships	Berlin, Germany	15th	50 km	
