= Takayuki Tanii =

Japanese race walker

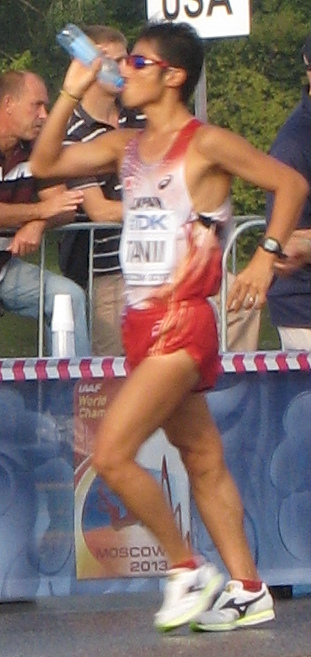
- Takayuki Tanii in 2013

Personal information
- Born: 14 February 1983 (age 43) Namerikawa, Japan
Medal record
Men's athletics
Representing Japan
World Championships
Bronze medal – third place	2015 Beijing	50 km walk

Takayuki Tanii (谷井孝行, Tanii Takayuki; born 14 February 1983 in Namerikawa) is a Japanese race walker. He competed in the 50 kilometres walk event at the 2012 Summer Olympics, but failed to finish.

== International competitions ==
Representing Japan
Year	Competition	Venue	Position	Event	Notes
2002	World Junior Championships	Kingston, Jamaica	7th	10,000m walk	42:24.54
2015	World Championships	Beijing, China	3rd	50 km	3:42:55
