= Alex Schwazer =

Italian race walker (born 1984)

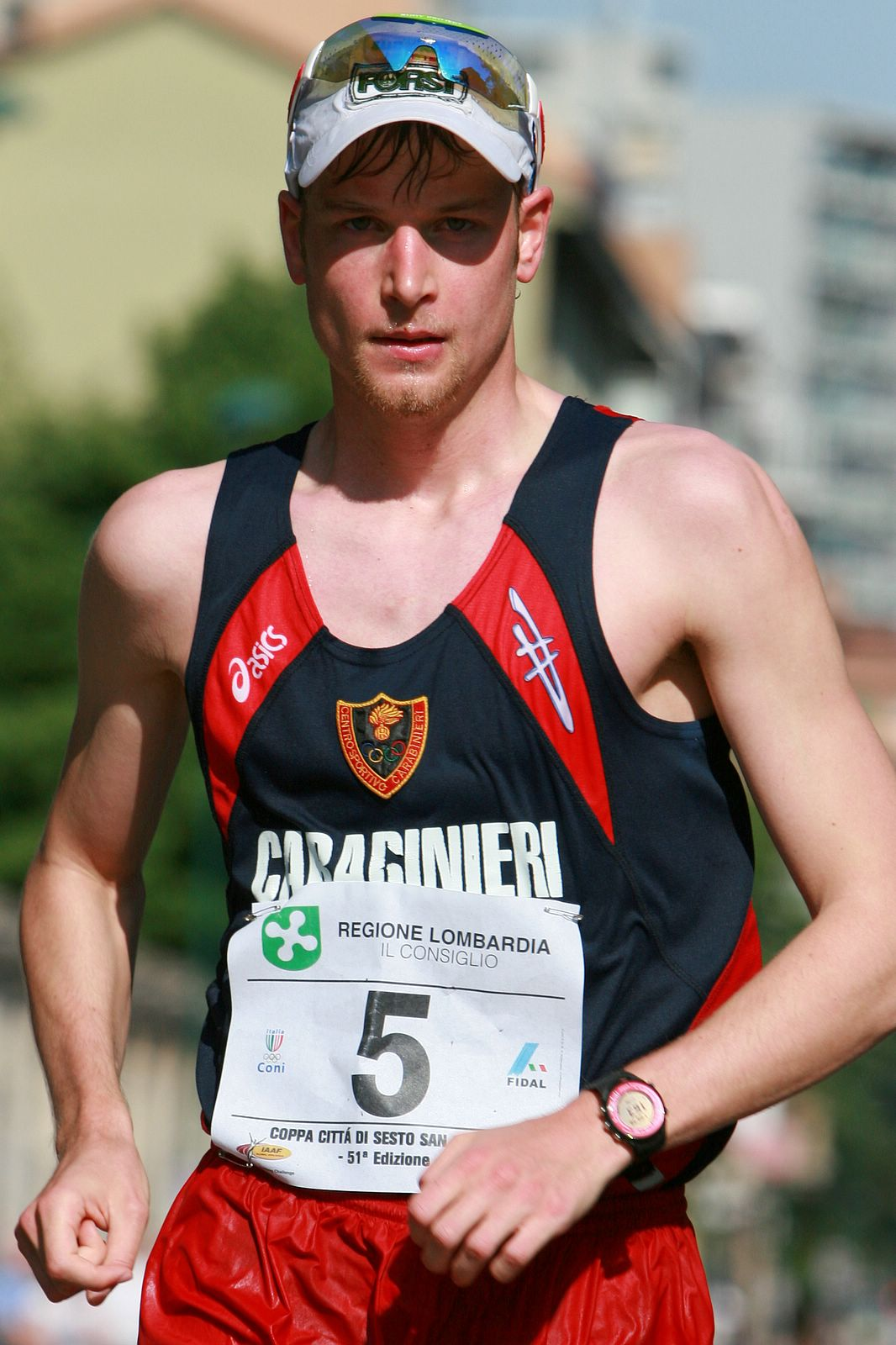
- Schwazer in 2008

Personal information
- Nationality: Italian
- Born: 26 December 1984 (age 41) Sterzing, Italy
- Height: 1.85 m (6 ft 1 in)
- Weight: 73 kg (161 lb)

Sport
- Country: Italy
- Sport: Athletics
- Event: Racewalking
- Club: C.S. Carabinieri

Achievements and titles
- Personal bests: 20 km walk: 1:18:24 (2010); 50 km walk; 3:36:04 (2007)
Medal record
Olympic Games
Gold medal – first place	2008 Beijing	50 km walk
World Championships
Bronze medal – third place	2005 Helsinki	50 km walk
Bronze medal – third place	2007 Osaka	50 km walk
European Championships
Gold medal – first place	2010 Barcelona	20 km walk

Alex Schwazer, OMRI (born 26 December 1984), is an Italian race walker. He was the 2008 Olympic 50k walk champion.

Just before the 2012 Summer Olympics, he was disqualified for two years for doping with EPO. He immediately admitted his guilt and retired. He subsequently decided to resume training with Sandro Donati, a prominent anti-doping advocate who was the one who had flagged him as suspicious to WADA in 2012. Their goal was to prove that it was possible to win even without doping. He qualified for the 2016 Summer Olympics but was found positive to micro-doping with testosterone and disqualified for eight years. Schwazer has always claimed his innocence in this case and has appealed the disqualification starting a complex judicial case. His appeals to the Court of Arbitration for Sport were unsuccessful. However, an Italian criminal court investigating the case acquitted him in 2021 per non aver commesso il reato ("for not committing the offence"), with Italian prosecutors accusing the World Anti-Doping Agency (WADA) and the IAAF of tampering and procedural fraud. WADA and IAAF have denied the allegations. Schwazer is currently still fighting the disqualification.

Italian newspaper La Repubblica published an investigation on this affair, suggesting evidence indicating a plot to punish Schwazer and his trainer Donati for their whistleblowing efforts against state-sponsored doping and for exposing corruption in WADA and IAAF.

== Biography ==
Schwazer was born in Sterzing, South Tyrol, in northern Italy. Schwazer won the bronze medal in the 50 km race at the 2005 World Championships in a national record time of 3:41.54 hours. At the 2007 World Championships he finished tenth in the 20 km race and won bronze again in the 50 km race (with the quickest finish ever measured on this event, of 3:37:04.08). He was the runner-up at the 2008 IAAF World Race Walking Cup and went on to win gold at the 50 km walk at the 2008 Summer Olympics, setting a new Olympic record with his time of 3:37:09.

He started his 2010 campaign with two wins on the 2010 IAAF World Race Walking Challenge circuit: first he won the 20 km at the Gran Premio Città di Lugano in an Italian record time, breaking Maurizio Damilano's 18-year-old record with a time of 1:18:23.20. Just prior to the IAAF World Race Walking Cup he won at the Coppa Città di Sesto San Giovanni. At the 2010 European Athletics Championships, he failed to finish the 50 km walk, but doubled up in the 20 km and took the silver medal behind Russia's Stanislav Emelyanov. He competed in the 20 km race at the 2011 World Championships in Athletics, but managed only ninth place.

He began 2012 in strong form. First he walked an Italian record of 1:17:30 hours to win at the Memorial Mario Albisetti 20 km walk, then he had the fourth best 50 km time of his career a week later to win at the Dudinska patdesiatka.

== Doping cases ==
Schwazer was excluded from the 2012 Summer Olympics in London after an "adverse result" from a doping test. Schwazer said,"My career is finished... I wanted to be stronger for this Olympics, I made a mistake.” He announced his decision to quit athletics and described the result as the "biggest blow of my life". He was subsequently given a three-and-a-half-year competition ban by the Italian National Olympic Committee in April 2013. Schwazer's girlfriend at the time of the offence, figure skater Carolina Kostner, later admitted to prosecutors in Bolzano that she had lied to inspectors from the World Anti-Doping Agency shortly before the 2012 Games when they visited her home looking for Schwazer, claiming that he was not there so he could avoid being tested. She also told the prosecutors that Schwazer slept in an altitude chamber, which is not banned by WADA but is illegal in Italy.

In May 2016, a negative doping control sample from January was flagged as anomalous by the Athlete Biological Passport and upon further inspection was found positive for a microdose of testosterone. Schwazer was informed about the positive in June, a few weeks before the Olympic Games. He appealed the case to the Court of Arbitration for Sport. On 11 August 2016 the court dismissed his appeal and imposed an 8-year period of ineligibility on him, until 7 July 2024.

On 12 June 2019 FIDAL cancelled all results achieved by the athlete starting 18 March 2012, thus also cancelling his Italian record of 1:17:30 made in Lugano on 18 March 2012.

Italian newspaper La Repubblica, however, produced a documentary with evidence, including police phone tapping, which cast serious doubt on the treatment of Schwazer and strongly suggests that the 2016 doping control sample was tampered with. The documentary suggests that the real target was Schwazer's trainer since 2015, Sandro Donati, former trainer of the Italian sprint team, whistle-blower and a long term critic both of doping and corruption in sport, who had uncovered Italian state-sponsored cheating in the 1980s. In 2020 La Repubblica published a long-form article on this affair, outlining the dubious aspects of this doping offence that could be a plot.

In 2016 an Italian criminal investigation against Schwazer was also opened in the court of Bolzano. On 17 March 2020 the doping ban was confirmed by the federal tribunal of Lausanne after a rejected appeal by Schwazer. On 18 February 2021, the Italian criminal case against Schwazer was closed. Schwazer was acquitted of all charges per non aver commeso il reato ("for not committing the offence") and the court accused WADA and the IAAF of samples tampering. However, his eight-year ban remains in place, because the WADA rejected all accusations and the Lausanne federal court finally refused to suspend the ongoing disqualification.

Schwazer hence wasn't eligible to take part in Tokyo 2020 Olympic (postponed in 2021 due to COVID-19 pandemic).

== Media ==
In 2023, Netflix released a 4 part miniseries on Schwazer's doping controversy. In September 2023 he began participating in the seventeenth edition of Grande Fratello, the Italian version of Big Brother.

== See also ==
- Italian records in athletics
- Italian all-time lists: 20 km walk
- Italian all-time lists: 50 km walk
