= Poland at the 2017 World Championships in Athletics =

- WA code: POL
- National federation: Polski Związek Lekkiej Atletyki
- Website: www.pzla.pl

in London
- Competitors: 51 in 29 events
- Medals Ranked 8th: Gold 2 Silver 2 Bronze 4 Total 8

World Championships in Athletics appearances
- 1976; 1980; 1983; 1987; 1991; 1993; 1995; 1997; 1999; 2001; 2003; 2005; 2007; 2009; 2011; 2013; 2015; 2017; 2019; 2022; 2023; 2025

Poland competed at the 2017 World Championships in Athletics in London, United Kingdom, from 4–13 August 2017.

== Medalists ==
Medal	Name	Event	Date
Gold	Anita Włodarczyk	Hammer throw	7 August
Gold	Paweł Fajdek	Hammer throw	11 August
Silver	Adam Kszczot	Men's 800 metres	8 August
Silver	Piotr Lisek	Pole vault	8 August
Bronze	Malwina Kopron	Hammer throw	7 August
Bronze	Wojciech Nowicki	Hammer throw	11 August
Bronze	Kamila Lićwinko	High jump	12 August
Bronze	Małgorzata Hołub; Iga Baumgart; Aleksandra Gaworska; Justyna Święty; Martyna Dąbrowska*; Patrycja Wyciszkiewicz*	4 × 400 metres relay	13 August

* Indicates the athlete only competed in the preliminary heats and received medals.

== Results ==
(q – qualified, NM – no mark, SB – season best, PB – personal best)

=== Men ===
Track and road events

Athlete	Event	Heat		Semifinal		Final	
Athlete	Event	Result	Rank	Result	Rank	Result	Rank
Rafał Omelko	400 metres	45.69	21 q	45.37	18	Did not advance	
Adam Kszczot	800 metres	1:47.36	30 Q	1:46.24	10 Q	1:44.95	2nd place, silver medalist(s)
Marcin Lewandowski	800 metres	1:46.17	14 q	1:45.93	7	Did not advance	
Michał Rozmys	800 metres	1:47.09	26 Q	1:46.10	9	Did not advance	
Michał Rozmys	1500 metres	3:40.28	11 q	3:42.94	22	Did not advance	
Marcin Lewandowski	1500 metres	3:46.06	27 Q	3:38.32	3 Q	3:36.02	7
Damian Czykier	110 metres hurdles	13.53	19 Q	13.42	14	Did not advance	
Patryk Dobek	400 metres hurdles	49.42	7 Q	49.40	11	Did not advance	
Krystian Zalewski	3000 metres steeplechase	8:28.41	19	—N/a		Did not advance	
Kajetan Duszyński; Łukasz Krawczuk; Tymoteusz Zimny; Rafał Omelko	4 × 400 metres relay	3:01.78 SB	7 Q	—N/a		3:01.59 SB	7
Artur Brzozowski	20 kilometres walk	—N/a				1:20:33 PB	12
Damian Błocki	20 kilometres walk	—N/a				1:21:29 PB	20
Jakub Jelonek	20 kilometres walk	—N/a				1:27:43	53
Rafał Augustyn	50 kilometres walk	—N/a				3:44.18 SB	7
Adrian Błocki	50 kilometres walk	—N/a				3:55.49	24
Rafał Fedaczyński	50 kilometres walk	—N/a				3:52.11	22

Field events

Athlete	Event	Qualification		Final	
Athlete	Event	Distance	Position	Distance	Position
Sylwester Bednarek	High jump	2.26	20	Did not advance	
Tomasz Jaszczuk	Long jump	7.64	26	Did not advance	
Paweł Wojciechowski	Pole vault	5.70	7 q	5.75	5
Piotr Lisek	Pole vault	5.70	1 q	5.89	2nd place, silver medalist(s)
Konrad Bukowiecki	Shot put	20.55	12 q	20.89	8
Michał Haratyk	Shot put	21.27	3 Q	21.41	5
Jakub Szyszkowski	Shot put	20.54	13	Did not advance	
Piotr Małachowski	Discus throw	65.13	4 Q	65.24	5
Robert Urbanek	Discus throw	63.67	8 Q	64.15	7
Paweł Fajdek	Hammer throw	76.82	2 Q	79.73	1st place, gold medalist(s)
Wojciech Nowicki	Hammer throw	76.85	1 Q	78.03	3rd place, bronze medalist(s)
Marcin Krukowski	Javelin throw	83.49	13 Q	82.01	9

=== Women ===
Track and road events

Athlete	Event	Heat		Semifinal		Final	
Athlete	Event	Result	Rank	Result	Rank	Result	Rank
Ewa Swoboda	100 metres	11.24 SB	18 q	11.35	24	Did not advance	
Anna Kiełbasińska	200 metres	23.48	25	Did not advance			
Iga Baumgart	400 metres	51.88	19 q	51.81	15	Did not advance	
Małgorzata Hołub	400 metres	52.26	28	Did not advance			
Justyna Święty	400 metres	53.62	44	Did not advance			
Joanna Jóźwik	800 metres	2:01.51	18 Q	2:01.91	20	Did not advance	
Angelika Cichocka	800 metres	2:00.86 SB	7 Q	1:59.32 SB	3 Q	1:58.41 PB	6
Sofia Ennaoui	1500 metres	4:03.35	7 Q	4:05.80	13	Did not advance	
Angelika Cichocka	1500 metres	4:03.27	6 Q	4:03.96	5 Q	4:04.16	7
Joanna Linkiewicz	400 metres hurdles	56.18	19 q	56.25	15	Did not advance	
Katarzyna Kowalska	Marathon	—N/a				2:39:39	36
Izabela Trzaskalska	Marathon	—N/a				2:35:03	23
Małgorzata Hołub; Iga Baumgart; Aleksandra Gaworska; Justyna Święty; Martyna Dąbrowska*; Patrycja Wyciszkiewicz*	4 × 400 metres relay	3:26.47 SB	6 q	—N/a		3:25.41 SB	3rd place, bronze medalist(s)

* – Indicates the athlete competed in preliminaries but not the final

Field events

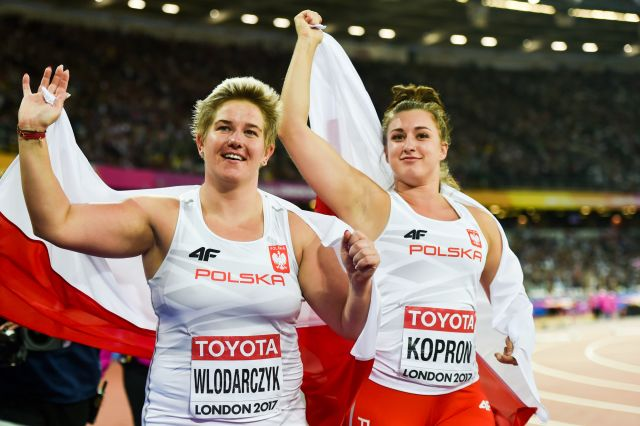
Hammer throwers Anita Włodarczyk and Malwina Kopron celebrating their medals at the 2017 World Championships in Athletics

Athlete	Event	Qualification		Final	
Athlete	Event	Distance	Position	Distance	Position
Kamila Lićwinko	High jump	1.92	=1 q	1.99 SB	3rd place, bronze medalist(s)
Anna Jagaciak-Michalska	Triple jump	14.09	10 q	14.25	6
Paulina Guba	Shot put	17.52	16	Did not advance	
Klaudia Kardasz	Shot put	17.52	17	Did not advance	
Anita Włodarczyk	Hammer throw	74.61	2 Q	77.90	1st place, gold medalist(s)
Joanna Fiodorow	Hammer throw	71.72	9 Q	73.04	6
Malwina Kopron	Hammer throw	74.97	1 Q	74.76	3rd place, bronze medalist(s)
Marcelina Witek	Javelin throw	59.00	22	Did not advance	
