= Poland at the 2025 World Athletics Championships =

- Flag of Poland
- WA code: POL

in Tokyo, Japan 13 September 2025 – 21 September 2025
- Competitors: 59 (23 men and 36 women)
- Medals Ranked 27th: Gold 0 Silver 1 Bronze 0 Total 1

World Athletics Championships appearances
- 1976; 1980; 1983; 1987; 1991; 1993; 1995; 1997; 1999; 2001; 2003; 2005; 2007; 2009; 2011; 2013; 2015; 2017; 2019; 2022; 2023; 2025

Poland competed at the 2025 World Athletics Championships in Tokyo, Japan, from 13 to 21 September 2025.

== Medallists ==
Medal	Athlete	Event	Date
Silver	Maria Żodzik	Women's high jump	September 21

== Results ==
Poland entered 59 athletes to the championships: 36 women and 23 men.

Key

- Q = Qualified for the next round
- q = Qualified for the next round as a fastest loser or, in field events, by position without achieving the qualifying target
- NR = National record
- PB = Personal best
- SB = Season best
- N/A = Round not applicable for the event

=== Men ===
Track and road events

Athlete	Event	Heat		Semifinal		Final	
Athlete	Event	Result	Rank	Result	Rank	Result	Rank
Maksymilian Szwed	400 metres	45.67	8	Did not advance			
Filip Ostrowski	800 metres	1:45.47	5	Did not advance			
Patryk Sieradzki	800 metres	1:45.99	7	Did not advance			
Maciej Wyderka	800 metres	1:46.30	1 Q	1:45.55	4	Did not advance	
Filip Rak	1500 metres	4:14.93	15	Did not advance			
Mateusz Kaczor	Marathon	—N/a				2:21:51 SB	50
Damian Czykier	110 metres hurdles	13.58	7	Did not advance			
Jakub Szymański	110 metres hurdles	13.74	7	Did not advance			
Adrian Brzeziński; Dominik Kopeć; Oliwer Wdowik; Łukasz Żak	4 × 100 metres relay	38.59	7	—N/a		Did not advance	
Maher Ben Hlima	20 kilometres walk	—N/a				1:20:39	14
Maher Ben Hlima	35 kilometres walk	—N/a				2:33:08	10

Field events

Athlete	Event	Qualification		Final	
Athlete	Event	Distance	Position	Distance	Position
Mateusz Kołodziejski	High jump	2.16	29	Did not advance	
Piotr Lisek	Pole vault	5.70	13	Did not advance	
Konrad Bukowiecki	Shot put	20.38	12 q	20.66	9
Paweł Fajdek	Hammer throw	78.78	2 Q	77.75	7
Marcin Wrotyński	Hammer throw	69.33	36	Did not advance	
Marcin Krukowski	Javelin throw	80.29	21	Did not advance	
Cyprian Mrzygłód	Javelin throw	81.47	16	Did not advance	
Dawid Wegner	Javelin throw	85.67 PB	4 Q	83.03	9

=== Women ===
Track and road events

Athlete	Event	Heat		Semifinal		Final	
Athlete	Event	Result	Rank	Result	Rank	Result	Rank
Ewa Swoboda	100 metres	11.18	3 Q	11.36	24	Did not advance	
Natalia Bukowiecka	400 metres	50.16	2 Q	49.67 SB	1 Q	49.27 SB	4
Justyna Święty-Ersetic	400 metres	51.80	5	Did not advance			
Margarita Koczanowa	800 metres	1:59:37 PB	5	Did not advance			
Angelika Sarna	800 metres	2:02.81	6	Did not advance			
Anna Wielgosz	800 metres	1:58.63	3 Q	1:59.72	8	Did not advance	
Klaudia Kazimierska	1500 metres	4:07.34	2 Q	4:07.83	4 Q	3:57.95 PB	7
Weronika Lizakowska	1500 metres	4:05.35	6 Q	4:03.39	9	Did not advance	
Aleksandra Brzezińska	Marathon	—N/a				2:39:46	39
Izabela Paszkiewicz	Marathon	—N/a				DNF	
Alicja Sielska	100 metres hurdles	12.99	4	Did not advance			
Pia Skrzyszowska	100 metres hurdles	12.51 SB	2 Q	12.53	3 q	12.49 SB	5
Anna Gryc	400 metres hurdles	55.73	6	Did not advance			
Alicja Konieczek	3000 metres steeplechase	9:28.80	7	—N/a		Did not advance	
Kinga Królik	3000 metres steeplechase	9:43.89	10	—N/a		Did not advance	
Ewa Swoboda; Magdalena Niemczyk; Pia Skrzyszowska; Krystsina Tsimanouskaya	4 × 100 metres relay	42.83 SB	5 q	—N/a		DQ	
Natalia Bukowiecka; Aleksandra Formella*; Anna Gryc; Justyna Święty-Ersetic; Alicja Wrona-Kutrzepa	4 × 400 metres relay	3:24.39 SB	3 Q	—N/a		3:22.91 SB	5
Katarzyna Zdziebło	20 kilometres walk	—N/a				1:29:31	14
Agnieszka Ellward	35 kilometres walk	—N/a				3:08:21	25
Katarzyna Zdziebło	35 kilometres walk	—N/a				2:44:37 SB	5

Field events

Athlete	Event	Qualification		Final	
Athlete	Event	Distance	Position	Distance	Position
Maria Żodzik	High jump	1.92	8 q	2.00	2nd place, silver medalist(s)
Nikola Horowska	Long jump	6.39	22	Did not advance	
Anna Matuszewicz	Long jump	6.48	18	Did not advance	
Daria Zabawska	Discus throw	57.78	28	Did not advance	
Katarzyna Furmanek	Hammer throw	66.70	29	Did not advance	
Ewa Różańska	Hammer throw	68.34	24	Did not advance	
Anita Włodarczyk	Hammer throw	73.69	6 q	74.64	6
Maria Andrejczyk	Javelin throw	60.04	16	Did not advance	
Małgorzata Maślak-Glugla	Javelin throw	61.79 PB	9 q	57.80	12

Combined events – Heptathlon

Athlete	Event	100H	HJ	SP	200 m	LJ	JT	800 m	Final	Rank
Adrianna Sułek-Schubert	Result	13.47	1.80 m	14.53 m	24.38	5.78 m	39.32 m	2:17.25	6105	15
Adrianna Sułek-Schubert	Points	1055	978	829	945	783	654	861	6105	15

=== Mixed ===
Track events

Athlete	Event	Heat		Final	
Athlete	Event	Result	Rank	Result	Rank
Natalia Bukowiecka (W); Kajetan Duszyński (M); Anna Gryc* (W); Maksymilian Szwed (M); Justyna Święty-Ersetic (W)	4 × 400 metres relay	3:11.15	3 Q	3:10.63	4
