= 2006 World Junior Championships in Athletics – Men's 10,000 metres walk =

The men's 10,000 metres walk event at the 2006 World Junior Championships in Athletics was held in Beijing, China, at Chaoyang Sports Centre on 19 August.

== Medalists ==
Gold	Bo Xiangdong; China
Silver	Huang Zhengyu; China
Bronze	Yusuke Suzuki; Japan

== Results ==
=== Final ===
19 August

Rank	Name	Nationality	Time	Notes
1st place, gold medalist(s)	Bo Xiangdong	China	42:50.26	
2nd place, silver medalist(s)	Huang Zhengyu	China	43:13.29	
3rd place, bronze medalist(s)	Yusuke Suzuki	Japan	43:45.62	
4	Denis Simanovich	Belarus	44:10.12	
5	Lluís Torlá	Spain	44:12.56	
6	Hiroyuki Hirano	Japan	44:18.91	
7	Herbert de Almeida	Brazil	44:23.22	
8	Matteo Giupponi	Italy	44:33.97	
9	Aléxandros Papamihaíl	Greece	44:36.15	
10	Juan Manuel Cano	Argentina	45:09.42	
11	Heikki Kukkonen	Finland	45:28.03	
12	Dušan Majdan	Slovakia	45:44.16	
13	Dmitry Gamzunov	Belarus	45:47.04	
14	Miguel Ángel López	Spain	45:54.41	
15	Aleksey Grigoryev	Russia	45:57.30	
16	Yassir Cabrera	Panama	46:02.33	
17	Mauricio Arteaga	Ecuador	46:13.65	
18	Emerson Hernández	El Salvador	46:23.20	
19	Abdurrahim Çelik	Turkey	48:42.44	
20	Rafael Avendaño	Mexico	49:13.42	
	José Javier Sánchez	Mexico	DQ	
	Sergey Morozov	Russia	DNF	
	Amine Djerarfaoui	Algeria	DNF	
	Arnis Rumbenieks	Latvia	DNF	

== Participation ==
According to an unofficial count, 24 athletes from 18 countries participated in the event.

- Algeria (1)
- Argentina (1)
- Belarus (2)
- Brazil (1)
- China (2)
- Ecuador (1)
- El Salvador (1)
- Finland (1)
- Greece (1)
- Italy (1)
- Japan (2)
- Latvia (1)
- Mexico (2)
- Panama (1)
- Russia (2)
- Slovakia (1)
- Spain (2)
- Turkey (1)
