= Poland at the 2023 World Athletics Championships =

- Flag of Poland
- WA code: POL

in Budapest, Hungary 19 August 2023 – 27 August 2023
- Competitors: 67 (30 men and 37 women)
- Medals Ranked 24th: Gold 0 Silver 2 Bronze 0 Total 2

World Athletics Championships appearances
- 1976; 1980; 1983; 1987; 1991; 1993; 1995; 1997; 1999; 2001; 2003; 2005; 2007; 2009; 2011; 2013; 2015; 2017; 2019; 2022; 2023; 2025

Poland competed at the 2023 World Athletics Championships in Budapest, Hungary, from 19 to 27 August 2023.

== Medalists ==
Medal	Athlete	Event	Date
Silver	Wojciech Nowicki	Men's hammer throw	August 20
Silver	Natalia Kaczmarek	Women's 400 metres	August 23

== Results ==
Poland entered 67 athletes.

Key

- Q = Qualified for the next round
- q = Qualified for the next round as a fastest loser or, in field events, by position without achieving the qualifying target
- NR = National record
- PB = Personal best
- SB = Season best
- N/A = Round not applicable for the event

=== Men ===
Track and road events

Athlete	Event	Heat		Semifinal		Final	
Athlete	Event	Result	Rank	Result	Rank	Result	Rank
Dominik Kopeć	100 metres	10.12	4 q	10.15	7	Did not advance	
Albert Komański	200 metres	21.16	7	Did not advance			
Karol Zalewski	400 metres	46.53	6	Did not advance			
Mateusz Borkowski	800 metres	1:45.40	1 Q	1:44.30 PB	4	Did not advance	
Filip Ostrowski	800 metres	1:45.76	4 q	1:45.30 PB	6	Did not advance	
Michał Rozmys	1500 metres	3:36.26 SB	11	Did not advance			
Adam Nowicki	Marathon	—N/a				2:16:22	34
Damian Czykier	110 metres hurdles	13.49 SB	3 Q	13.97	7	Did not advance	
Krzysztof Kiljan	110 metres hurdles	14.09	8	Did not advance			
Jakub Szymański	110 metres hurdles	13.65	7	Did not advance			
Artur Brzozowski	35 kilometres walk	—N/a				DQ	
Jakub Jelonek	35 kilometres walk	—N/a				2:38:45	26
Dawid Tomala	35 kilometres walk	—N/a				DNF	
Adam Burda; Dominik Kopeć; Mateusz Siuda; Łukasz Żak	4 × 100 metres relay	DNF		—N/a		Did not advance	

Field events

Athlete	Event	Qualification		Final	
Athlete	Event	Distance	Position	Distance	Position
Norbert Kobielski	High jump	2.28 SB	12 q	2.25	10
Piotr Lisek	Pole vault	5.75	=9 q	5.75	=9
Robert Sobera	Pole vault	5.75 SB	=9 q	5.55	=12
Paweł Wojciechowski	Pole vault	5.35	=22	Did not advance	
Konrad Bukowiecki	Shot put	19.21	28	Did not advance	
Michał Haratyk	Shot put	19.51	25	Did not advance	
Oskar Stachnik	Discus throw	61.96	25	Did not advance	
Robert Urbanek	Discus throw	61.30	28	Did not advance	
Paweł Fajdek	Hammer throw	77.98	5 Q	80.00 SB	4
Wojciech Nowicki	Hammer throw	78.04	4 Q	81.02	2nd place, silver medalist(s)
Marcin Wrotyński	Hammer throw	68.65	33	Did not advance	
Cyprian Mrzygłód	Javelin throw	78.49	15	Did not advance	
Dawid Wegner	Javelin throw	81.25	7 q	80.75	9

=== Women ===
Track and road events

Athlete	Event	Heat		Semifinal		Final	
Athlete	Event	Result	Rank	Result	Rank	Result	Rank
Magdalena Stefanowicz	100 metres	11.43	6	Did not advance			
Ewa Swoboda	100 metres	10.98	1 Q	11.01	3 q	10.97	6
Krystsina Tsimanouskaya	100 metres	11.32	5	Did not advance			
Martyna Kotwiła	200 metres	23.34	6	Did not advance			
Krystsina Tsimanouskaya	200 metres	22.88	5 q	23.34	8	Did not advance	
Natalia Kaczmarek	400 metres	50.02	1 Q	49.50	1 Q	49.57	2nd place, silver medalist(s)
Margarita Koczanowa	800 metres	2:03.23	8	Did not advance			
Angelika Sarna	800 metres	2:01.78	6	Did not advance			
Anna Wielgosz	800 metres	2:03.61	8	Did not advance			
Sofia Ennaoui	1500 metres	4:06.47	10	Did not advance			
Eliza Megger	1500 metres	4:09.22	11	Did not advance			
Aleksandra Płocińska	1500 metres	4:06.39 PB	9	Did not advance			
Monika Jackiewicz	Marathon	—N/a				2:37:18	40
Aleksandra Lisowska	Marathon	—N/a				DNF	
Klaudia Siciarz	100 metres hurdles	13.25	8	Did not advance			
Pia Skrzyszowska	100 metres hurdles	12.65	2 Q	12.71	4	Did not advance	
Alicja Konieczek	3000 metres steeplechase	9:23.45 PB	6	—N/a		Did not advance	
Aneta Konieczek	3000 metres steeplechase	9:45.61	11	—N/a		Did not advance	
Katarzyna Zdziebło	20 kilometres walk	—N/a				DQ	
Olga Chojecka	35 kilometres walk	—N/a				2:46:48 PB	8
Agnieszka Ellward	35 kilometres walk	—N/a				2:56:51 PB	18
Katarzyna Zdziebło	35 kilometres walk	—N/a				DQ	
Pia Skrzyszowska; Magdalena Stefanowicz; Ewa Swoboda; Krystsina Tsimanouskaya	4 × 100 metres relay	42.65 SB	5 q	—N/a		42.66	5
Natalia Kaczmarek; Marika Popowicz-Drapała; Alicja Wrona-Kutrzepa; Patrycja Wyciszkiewicz-Zawadzka	4 × 400 metres relay	3:24.05 SB	4 q	—N/a		3:24.93	6

Field events

Athlete	Event	Qualification		Final	
Athlete	Event	Distance	Position	Distance	Position
Adrianna Laskowska	Triple jump	13.69	21	Did not advance	
Klaudia Kardasz	Shot put	17.27	24	Did not advance	
Daria Zabawska	Discus throw	59.28	16	Did not advance	
Malwina Kopron	Hammer throw	72.35 SB	9 q	NM	
Aleksandra Śmiech	Hammer throw	69.76	19	Did not advance	
Anita Włodarczyk	Hammer throw	71.17	13	Did not advance	

Combined events – Heptathlon

Athlete	Event	100H	HJ	SP	200 m	LJ	JT	800 m	Final	Rank
Paulina Ligarska	Result	14.31	1.71	13.71	25.41	5.66	40.57	DNS	DNF	
Paulina Ligarska	Points	935	867	775	850	747	678	0	DNF	

=== Mixed ===
Track events

Athlete	Event	Heat		Final	
Athlete	Event	Result	Rank	Result	Rank
Igor Bogaczyński; Kajetan Duszyński*; Marika Popowicz-Drapała; Patrycja Wyciszkiewicz-Zawadzka; Karol Zalewski	4 × 400 metres relay	3:14.63	14 qR	3:15.49	8
