= Poland at the 2009 World Championships in Athletics =

- WA code: POL
- National federation: Polski Związek Lekkiej Atletyki
- Website: www.pzla.pl

in Berlin
- Competitors: 42
- Medals Ranked 4th: Gold 2 Silver 4 Bronze 3 Total 9

World Championships in Athletics appearances
- 1976; 1980; 1983; 1987; 1991; 1993; 1995; 1997; 1999; 2001; 2003; 2005; 2007; 2009; 2011; 2013; 2015; 2017; 2019; 2022; 2023; 2025

Poland competed at the 2009 World Championships in Athletics from 15 to 23 August. A team of over 40 athletes was announced in preparation for the competition. Selected athletes have achieved one of the competition's qualifying standards. The squad includes both Polish athletes who were 2008 Olympics medalists: Tomasz Majewski (gold at shot put and 2009 world leaders), and Piotr Małachowski (silver at discus throw). Anna Rogowska (third in 2004 Olympics at pole vault) and Szymon Ziółkowski (2000 Olympic champion in the hammer throw) also participated in the Championships. In the women's hammer throw, Anita Włodarczyk of Poland won gold medal with a distance of 77.96m, which is a new world record.

Poland won 8 medals at the championships and was ranked fourth among all participating countries Medal Table.

== Medalists ==
| Medal | Name | Event | Date |
|---|---|---|---|
| Gold | Anna Rogowska | Pole vault | 17 August |
| Gold | Anita Włodarczyk | Hammer throw | 22 August |
| Silver | Tomasz Majewski | Shot put | 15 August |
| Silver | Monika Pyrek | Pole vault | 17 August |
| Silver | Szymon Ziółkowski | Hammer throw | 17 August |
| Silver | Piotr Małachowski | Discus throw | 19 August |
| Bronze | Kamila Chudzik | Heptathlon | 16 August |
| Bronze | Sylwester Bednarek | High jump | 21 August |
| Bronze | Grzegorz Sudoł | 50km walk | 21 August |

== Results ==
(q – qualified, NM – no mark, SB – season best)

=== Men ===
Track and road events

| Athlete | Event | Heat | | Semifinal | | Final | |
| Athlete | Event | Result | Rank | Result | Rank | Result | Rank |
|---|---|---|---|---|---|---|---|
| Dariusz Kuć | 100 metres | 10.38 | 31 | did not advance | | | |
| Marcin Marciniszyn | 400 metres | 45.77 SB | 22 | did not advance | | | |
| Adam Kszczot | 800 metres | 1:46.70 | 14 q | 1:46.33 | 14 | did not advance | |
| Marcin Lewandowski | 800 metres | 1:48.41 | 36 Q | 2:02.62 | 21 q | 1:46.17 | 8 |
| Artur Noga | 110 metres hurdles | 13.56 | 11 Q | 13.43 SB | 9 | did not advance | |
| Tomasz Szymkowiak | 3000 metres steeplechase | —N/a | | 8:27.93 | 19 | did not advance | |
| Marcin Marciniszyn; Piotr Klimczak; Kacper Kozłowski; Jan Ciepiela; Rafał Wieruszewski | 4 × 400 metres relay | 3:03.23 SB | 9 Q | —N/a | | 3:02.23 SB | 5 |
| Artur Brzozowski | 20 kilometres walk | —N/a | | | | 1:24.17 | 26 |
| Jakub Jelonek | 20 kilometres walk | —N/a | | | | 1:28.59 | 38 |
| Rafał Augustyn | 50 kilometres walk | —N/a | | | | 3:58.30 | 22 |
| Rafał Fedaczyński | 50 kilometres walk | —N/a | | | | DNF | |
| Grzegorz Sudoł | 50 kilometres walk | —N/a | | | | 3:42.34 PB | 3rd place, bronze medalist(s) |

Field events

| Athlete | Event | Qualification | | Final | |
| Athlete | Event | Distance | Position | Distance | Position |
|---|---|---|---|---|---|
| Sylwester Bednarek | High jump | 2.27 | 12 q | 2.32 PB | 3rd place, bronze medalist(s) |
| Grzegorz Sposób | High jump | 2.20 | 26 | did not advance | |
| Łukasz Michalski | Pole vault | 5.40 | 20 | did not advance | |
| Tomasz Majewski | Shot put | 21.19 | 1 Q | 21.91 | 2nd place, silver medalist(s) |
| Piotr Małachowski | Discus throw | 64.48 | 8 q | 69.15 NR | 2nd place, silver medalist(s) |
| Szymon Ziółkowski | Hammer throw | 77.89 | 2 Q | 79.30 SB | 2nd place, silver medalist(s) |
| Igor Janik | Javelin throw | 75.20 | 31 | did not advance | |
| Adrian Markowski | Javelin throw | 74.13 | 33 | did not advance | |

=== Women ===
Track and road events

| Athlete | Event | Heat | | Semifinal | | Final | |
| Athlete | Event | Result | Rank | Result | Rank | Result | Rank |
|---|---|---|---|---|---|---|---|
| Anna Rostkowska | 800 metres | 2:02.37 | 4 Q | 2:01.40 | 15 | did not advance | |
| Lidia Chojecka | 1500 metres | 4:09.38 | 22 q | 4:06.53 | 7 q | 4:07.17 | 7 |
| Sylwia Ejdys | 1500 metres | 4:08.59 | 12 Q | 4:11.33 | 21 | did not advance | |
| Joanna Kocielnik | 100 metres hurdles | 13.16 SB | 21 q | 13.21 | 21 | did not advance | |
| Anna Jesień | 400 metres hurdles | 55.57 | 10 Q | 54.82 | 8 | did not advance | |
| Katarzyna Kowalska | 3000 metres steeplechase | 9:26.93 PB | 10 Q | —N/a | | 9:30.37 | 12 |
| Iwona Ziółkowska; Marta Jeschke; Dorota Jędrusińska; Iwona Brzezińska | 4 × 100 metres relay | 43.63 | 9 | —N/a | | did not advance | |
| Agnieszka Dygacz | 20 kilometres walk | —N/a | | | | 1:38.36 | 28 |

Field events

| Athlete | Event | Qualification | | Final | |
| Athlete | Event | Distance | Position | Distance | Position |
|---|---|---|---|---|---|
| Kamila Stepaniuk | High jump | 1.92 | 16 | did not advance | |
| Anna Rogowska | Pole vault | 4.55 | 1 q | 4.75 | 1st place, gold medalist(s) |
| Monika Pyrek | Pole vault | 4.55 | 1 q | 4.65 | 2nd place, silver medalist(s) |
| Joanna Piwowarska | Pole vault | 4.25 | 22 | did not advance | |
| Teresa Dobija | Long jump | 6.55 | 10 q | 6.58 | 10 |
| Małgorzata Trybańska | Triple jump | 14.06 | 16 | did not advance | |
| Żaneta Glanc | Discus throw | 62.43 | 4 Q | 62.66 | 4 |
| Wioletta Potępa | Discus throw | 59.54 | 17 | did not advance | |
| Joanna Wiśniewska | Discus throw | 58.85 | 21 | did not advance | |
| Anita Włodarczyk | Hammer throw | 74.54 | 2 Q | 77.96 WR | 1st place, gold medalist(s) |
| Urszula Piwnicka | Javelin throw | 56.49 | 20 | did not advance | |

Combined events – Heptathlon

| Athlete | Event | 100H | HJ | SP | 200 m | LJ | JT | 800 m | Final | Rank |
|---|---|---|---|---|---|---|---|---|---|---|
| Kamila Chudzik | Result | 13.50 SB | 1.74 | 15.10 PB | 24.33 PB | 6.55 PB | 48.72 | 2:18.58 | 6471 SB | 3rd place, bronze medalist(s) |
| Kamila Chudzik | Points | 1050 | 903 | 868 | 949 | 1023 | 835 | 843 | 6471 SB | 3rd place, bronze medalist(s) |
| Karolina Tymińska | Result | 13.67 SB | 1.71 | 13.75 | 23.87 | DNS | | | DNF | |
| Karolina Tymińska | Points | 1026 | 867 | 777 | 993 | DNS | | | DNF | |
