= Poland at the 2022 World Athletics Championships =

Poland at the 2022 World Championships in Athletics
- WA code: POL

in Eugene, United States
- Medals Ranked 8th: Gold 1 Silver 3 Bronze 0 Total 4

World Championships in Athletics appearances
- 1976; 1980; 1983; 1987; 1991; 1993; 1995; 1997; 1999; 2001; 2003; 2005; 2007; 2009; 2011; 2013; 2015; 2017; 2019; 2022; 2023; 2025

Poland competed at the 2022 World Athletics Championships in Eugene, United States from 15 to 24 July 2022. Poland entered 45 athletes.

== Medalists ==
| Medal | Athlete | Event | Date |
|---|---|---|---|
| Gold | Paweł Fajdek | Men's hammer throw | 16 July |
| Silver | Katarzyna Zdziebło | Women's 20 kilometres walk | 15 July |
| Silver | Wojciech Nowicki | Men's hammer throw | 16 July |
| Silver | Katarzyna Zdziebło | Women's 35 kilometres walk | 22 July |

== Results ==
Key

- Q = Qualified for the next round
- q = Qualified for the next round as a fastest loser or, in field events, by position without achieving the qualifying target
- NM = Not measured
- NR = National record
- PB = Personal best
- SB = Season best
- N/A = Round not applicable for the event

=== Men ===
Track and road events

| Athlete | Event | Heat | | Semi-final | | Final | |
| Athlete | Event | Result | Rank | Result | Rank | Result | Rank |
|---|---|---|---|---|---|---|---|
| Kajetan Duszyński | 400 metres | 46.57 | 32 | did not advance | | | |
| Mateusz Borkowski | 800 metres | 1:47.61 | 30 | did not advance | | | |
| Patryk Dobek | 800 metres | 1:46.80 | 27 | did not advance | | | |
| Patryk Sieradzki | 800 metres | 1:48.78 | 34 | did not advance | | | |
| Michał Rozmys | 1500 metres | 3:36.76 | 17 q | 3:35.27 SB | 6 q | 3:34.58 SB | 10 |
| Damian Czykier | 110 metres hurdles | 13.37 | 8 Q | 13.22 | 6 q | 13.32 | 4 |
| Artur Brzozowski | 35 kilometres walk | — | | | | DQ | |
| Dawid Tomala | 35 kilometres walk | — | | | | 2:30:47 PB | 19 |
| Kajetan Duszyński; Maksymilian Klepacki; Mateusz Rzeźniczak; Karol Zalewski | 4 × 400 metres relay | 3:02.51 SB | 6 Q | — | | 3:02.51 =SB | 9 |

Field events

| Athlete | Event | Qualification | | Final | |
| Athlete | Event | Distance | Position | Distance | Position |
|---|---|---|---|---|---|
| Norbert Kobielski | High jump | NM | | did not advance | |
| Piotr Lisek | Pole vault | 5.50 | =19 | did not advance | |
| Robert Sobera | Pole vault | 5.50 | =24 | did not advance | |
| Konrad Bukowiecki | Shot put | 20.24 | 13 | did not advance | |
| Michał Haratyk | Shot put | 20.13 | 14 | did not advance | |
| Paweł Fajdek | Hammer throw | 80.09 | 1 Q | 81.98 SB | 1st place, gold medalist(s) |
| Wojciech Nowicki | Hammer throw | 79.22 | 3 Q | 81.03 | 2nd place, silver medalist(s) |
| Marcin Wrotyński | Hammer throw | 73.55 | 19 | did not advance | |

=== Women ===
Track and road events

| Athlete | Event | Heat | | Semi-final | | Final | |
| Athlete | Event | Result | Rank | Result | Rank | Result | Rank |
|---|---|---|---|---|---|---|---|
| Ewa Swoboda | 100 metres | 11.07 | 11 Q | 11.08 | 12 | did not advance | |
| Natalia Kaczmarek | 400 metres | 50.21 | 2 Q | 51.34 | 15 | did not advance | |
| Anna Kiełbasińska | 400 metres | 50.63 | 4 Q | 50.65 | 8 q | 50.81 | 8 |
| Anna Wielgosz | 800 metres | 2:00.79 | 7 Q | 2:00.51 | 16 | did not advance | |
| Sofia Ennaoui | 1500 metres | 4:03.52 SB | 4 Q | 4:05.17 | 14 Q | 4:01.43 SB | 5 |
| Klaudia Siciarz | 100 metres hurdles | 13.27 | 32 | did not advance | | | |
| Pia Skrzyszowska | 100 metres hurdles | 12.70 | 8 Q | 12.62 =PB | 10 | did not advance | |
| Kinga Królik | 3000 metres steeplechase | 9:44.74 | 36 | — | | did not advance | |
| Katarzyna Zdziebło | 20 kilometres walk | — | | | | 1:27:31 NR | 2nd place, silver medalist(s) |
| Katarzyna Zdziebło | 35 kilometres walk | — | | | | 2:40:03 PB | 2nd place, silver medalist(s) |
| Olga Niedziałek | 35 kilometres walk | — | | | | 2:49:43 PB | 11 |
| Martyna Kotwiła; Marika Popowicz-Drapała; Magdalena Stefanowicz; Ewa Swoboda | 4 × 100 metres relay | 43.19 SB | 11 | — | | did not advance | |
| Iga Baumgart-Witan; Kinga Gacka; Małgorzata Hołub-Kowalik; Justyna Święty-Ersetic | 4 × 400 metres relay | 3:29.34 | 10 | — | | did not advance | |

* – Indicates the athlete competed in preliminaries but not the final

Field events

| Athlete | Event | Qualification | | Final | |
| Athlete | Event | Distance | Position | Distance | Position |
|---|---|---|---|---|---|
| Malwina Kopron | Hammer throw | 70.50 | 15 | did not advance | |
| Maria Andrejczyk | Javelin throw | 55.47 | 21 | did not advance | |

Combined events – Heptathlon

| Athlete | Event | 100H | HJ | SP | 200 m | LJ | JT | 800 m | Final | Rank |
|---|---|---|---|---|---|---|---|---|---|---|
| Paulina Ligarska | Result | 14.19 | 1.77 | 14.08 | 24.65 PB | 5.88 | 45.89 | 2:15.36 | 6093 | 10 |
| Paulina Ligarska | Points | 952 | 941 | 799 | 919 | 813 | 781 | 888 | 6093 | 10 |
| Adrianna Sułek | Result | 13.28 | 1.89 | 14.13 PB | 23.77 PB | 6.43 =PB | 41.63 SB | 2:07.18 PB | 6672 NR | 4 |
| Adrianna Sułek | Points | 1083 | 1093 | 803 | 1003 | 1014 | 699 | 1006 | 6672 NR | 4 |

=== Mixed ===
Track and road events

| Athlete | Event | Heat | | Semi-final | | Final | |
| Athlete | Event | Result | Rank | Result | Rank | Result | Rank |
|---|---|---|---|---|---|---|---|
| Iga Baumgart-Witan*; Kajetan Duszyński; Natalia Kaczmarek; Justyna Święty-Ersetic; Karol Zalewski | 4 × 400 metres relay | 3:13.70 SB | 4 Q | — | | 3:12.31 SB | 4 |

* – Indicates the athlete competed in preliminaries but not the final
