= Poland at the 2013 World Championships in Athletics =

2013 World Championships in Athletics in Moscow

- WA code: POL
- National federation: Polski Związek Lekkiej Atletyki
- Website: www.pzla.pl

in Moscow
- Competitors: 55
- Medals Ranked 8th: Gold 2 Silver 1 Bronze 0 Total 3

World Championships in Athletics appearances
- 1976; 1980; 1983; 1987; 1991; 1993; 1995; 1997; 1999; 2001; 2003; 2005; 2007; 2009; 2011; 2013; 2015; 2017; 2019; 2022; 2023; 2025

Poland competed at the 2013 World Championships in Athletics in Moscow, Russia. They competed from 10–18 August 2013, and a team of 55 athlete was announced to represent the country in the event.

== Medalists ==
Medal	Name	Event	Date
Gold	Paweł Fajdek	Hammer throw	12 August
Silver	Piotr Małachowski	Discus throw	13 August
Gold	Anita Włodarczyk	Hammer throw	16 August

== Results ==
(q – qualified, NM – no mark, SB – season best)

=== Men ===
Track and road events

Athlete	Event	Heats		Semifinals		Final	
Athlete	Event	Time	Rank	Time	Rank	Time	Rank
Karol Zalewski	200 metres	20.60	19 q	20.66	20	Did not advance	
Adam Kszczot	800 metres	1:46.26	9 Q	1:45.68	12	Did not advance	
Marcin Lewandowski	800 metres	1:47.83	2 Q	1:44.56	3 q	1:44.08 SB	4
Artur Noga	110 metres hurdle	13.44	14 q	13.35	7	Did not advance	
Mateusz Demczyszak	3000 metres steeplechase	8:34.60	28	—N/a		Did not advance	
Krystian Zalewski	3000 metres steeplechase	DSQ		—N/a		Did not advance	
Jakub Adamski; Kamil Kryński; Robert Kubaczyk; Artur Zaczek; Karol Zalewski; Grzegorz Zimniewicz	4 × 100 metres relay	38.51	11	—N/a		Did not advance	
Kacper Kozłowski; Rafal Omelko; Łukasz Krawczuk; Marcin Marciniszyn	4 × 400 metres relay	3:01.73 SB	7	—N/a		Did not advance	
Rafał Augustyn	20 kilometres walk	—N/a				1:24:03	19
Dawid Tomala	20 kilometres walk	—N/a				DNF	
Adrian Błocki	50 kilometres walk	—N/a				3:51:00	21
Grzegorz Sudoł	50 kilometres walk	—N/a				3:41:20 PB	6
Łukasz Nowak	50 kilometres walk	—N/a				3:43:38 SB	8

Field events

Athlete	Event	Preliminaries		Final	
Athlete	Event	Width Height	Rank	Width Height	Rank
Szymon Kiecana	High jump	2.17	25	Did not advance	
Robert Sobera	Pole vault	NM		Did not advance	
Tomasz Majewski	Shot put	20.76	3 Q	20.98 SB	6
Jakub Szyszkowski	Shot put	19.36	17	Did not advance	
Piotr Małachowski	Discus throw	66.00	2 Q	68.36	2nd place, silver medalist(s)
Robert Urbanek	Discus throw	64.21	5 q	64.32	6
Łukasz Grzeszczuk	Javelin throw	74.72	28	Did not advance	
Marcin Krukowski	Javelin throw	76.93	25	Did not advance	
Paweł Fajdek	Hammer throw	76.17	9 q	81.97 WL	1st place, gold medalist(s)
Szymon Ziółkowski	Hammer throw	76.85	7 q	76.84	9

=== Women ===
Track and road events

Athlete	Event	Heats		Semifinals		Final	
Athlete	Event	Time	Rank	Time	Rank	Time	Rank
Marika Popowicz	200 metres	23.22 SB	25	Did not advance			
Renata Pliś	1500 metres	4:08.20	12 Q	4:08.02	16	Did not advance	
Dominika Nowakowska	5000 metres	15:45.10	13 q	—N/a		15:58.26	14
Karolina Jarzyńska	10,000 metres	—N/a				32:54.15	15
Katarzyna Kowalska	3000 metres steeplechase	9:44.12	16	—N/a		Did not advance	
Marika Popowicz; Weronika Wedler; Ewelina Ptak; Marta Jeschke	4 × 100 metres relay	43.18 SB	10	—N/a		Did not advance	
Malgorzata Holub; Patrycja Wyciszkiewicz; Iga Baumgart; Justyna Święty	4 × 400 metres relay	3:29.75	9	—N/a		Did not advance	
Paulina Buziak	20 kilometres walk	—N/a				1:33:30	30
Agnieszka Dygacz	20 kilometres walk	—N/a				1:34:42	44
Katarzyna Kwoka	20 kilometres walk	—N/a				1:36:54	53

Field events

Athlete	Event	Preliminaries		Final	
Athlete	Event	Width Height	Rank	Width Height	Rank
Anna Jagaciak	Triple jump	13.96	10 q	13.95	10
Justyna Kasprzycka	High jump	1.92	11 q	1.97 PB	6
Kamila Stepaniuk	High jump	1.92	10 q	1.93	7
Anna Rogowska	Pole vault	NM		Did not advance	
Żaneta Glanc	Discus throw	61.62	8 q	62.90 SB	7
Anita Włodarczyk	Hammer throw	76.18	1 Q	78.46 NR	2nd place, silver medalist(s)

Combined events – Heptathlon

Athlete	Event	100H	HJ	SP	200 m	LJ	JT	800 m	Final	Rank
Karolina Tymińska	Result	13.48	1.68	13.74	24.13	6.32	40.61	2:06.64 SB	6270	9
Karolina Tymińska	Points	1053	830	777	968	949	679	1014	6270	9
