= Poland at the 2019 World Athletics Championships =

Poland at the 2019 World Championships in Athletics
- WA code: POL

in Doha, Qatar
- Medals Ranked 11th: Gold 1 Silver 2 Bronze 3 Total 6

World Championships in Athletics appearances
- 1976; 1980; 1983; 1987; 1991; 1993; 1995; 1997; 1999; 2001; 2003; 2005; 2007; 2009; 2011; 2013; 2015; 2017; 2019; 2022; 2023

Poland competed at the 2019 World Championships in Athletics in Doha, Qatar from 27 September to 6 October 2019. The country finished in 11th place in the medal table.

== Medalists ==
Medal	Athlete	Event	Date
Gold	Paweł Fajdek	Men's hammer throw	October 2
Silver	Iga Baumgart-Witan; Patrycja Wyciszkiewicz; Małgorzata Hołub-Kowalik; Justyna Święty-Ersetic; Anna Kiełbasińska*	Women's 4 × 400 metres relay	October 6
Silver	Joanna Fiodorow	Women's hammer throw	September 28
Bronze	Marcin Lewandowski	Men's 1500 metres	October 6
Bronze	Piotr Lisek	Men's pole vault	October 1
Bronze	Wojciech Nowicki	Men's hammer throw	October 2

== Results ==
(q – qualified, NM – no mark, SB – season best)

=== Men ===
Track and road events

Athlete	Event	Heat		Semifinal		Final	
Athlete	Event	Result	Rank	Result	Rank	Result	Rank
Adam Kszczot	800 metres	1:46.20	21 q	1:45.22	11	Did not advance	
Marcin Lewandowski	1500 metres	3:37.75	20 Q	3:36.50	1 Q	3:31.46 NR	3rd place, bronze medalist(s)
Damian Czykier	110 metres hurdles	Did not start		Did not advance			
Patryk Dobek	400 metres hurdles	49.89	18 Q	50.18	22	Did not advance	
Krystian Zalewski	3000 metres steeplechase	8:51.79	43	—		Did not advance	
Dawid Tomala	20 kilometres walk	—				1:38:15	32
Rafał Augustyn	50 kilometres walk	—				4:20:25	13
Artur Brzozowski	50 kilometres walk	—				4:30:17	22
Rafał Fedaczyński	50 kilometres walk	—				4:50:08	28

Field events

Athlete	Event	Qualification		Final	
Athlete	Event	Distance	Position	Distance	Position
Paweł Wojciechowski	Pole vault	5.70	13	Did not advance	
Piotr Lisek	Pole vault	5.75	1 Q	5.87	3rd place, bronze medalist(s)
Robert Sobera	Pole vault	5.60	19	Did not advance	
Konrad Bukowiecki	Shot put	21.16	6 Q	21.46	6
Michał Haratyk	Shot put	20.52	16	Did not advance	
Jakub Szyszkowski	Shot put	20.55	15	Did not advance	
Piotr Małachowski	Discus throw	62.20	17	Did not advance	
Bartłomiej Stój	Discus throw	61.79	22	Did not advance	
Robert Urbanek	Discus throw	61.78	23	Did not advance	
Paweł Fajdek	Hammer throw	79.24	1 Q	80.50	1st place, gold medalist(s)
Wojciech Nowicki	Hammer throw	77.89	2 Q	77.69	3rd place, bronze medalist(s)
Marcin Krukowski	Javelin throw	82.44	11 q	80.56	7

Combined events – Decathlon

Athlete	Event	200 m	LJ	SP	HJ	400 m	100H	DT	PV	JT	1500 m	Final	Rank
Paweł Wiesiołek	Result	10.76 SB	7.02	15.26 PB	1.96	49.37	14.65	47.20	4.90 PB	55.00	4:42.06	8064	12
Paweł Wiesiołek	Points	915	818	806	767	844	892	812	880	663	667	8064	12

=== Women ===
Track and road events

Athlete	Event	Heat		Semifinal		Final	
Athlete	Event	Result	Rank	Result	Rank	Result	Rank
Ewa Swoboda	100 metres	11.29	21 q	11.27	16	Did not advance	
Iga Baumgart-Witan	400 metres	51.34	11 Q	51.02 PB	8 q	51.29	8
Anna Kiełbasińska	400 metres	52.25	34	Did not advance			
Justyna Święty-Ersetic	400 metres	51.34	11 Q	50.96	7 Q	50.95	7
Anna Sabat	800 metres	2:02.43	15 q	2:04.00	21	Did not advance	
Karolina Kołeczek	100 metres hurdles	12.78	9 Q	12.86	12	Did not advance	
Joanna Linkiewicz	400 metres hurdles	55.97	20 Q	55.38 SB	14	Did not advance	
Alicja Konieczek	3000 metres steeplechase	9:44.96	28	Did not advance			
Katarzyna Zdziebło	20 kilometres walk	—				1:38:44	21
Małgorzata Hołub-Kowalik; Iga Baumgart-Witan; Patrycja Wyciszkiewicz; Justyna Święty-Ersetic; Anna Kiełbasińska*	4 × 400 metres relay	3:25.78	4 Q	—		3:21.89 NR	2nd place, silver medalist(s)

* – Indicates the athlete competed in preliminaries but not the final

Field events

Athlete	Event	Qualification		Final	
Athlete	Event	Distance	Position	Distance	Position
Kamila Lićwinko	High jump	1.94	7 Q	1.98 SB	5
Paulina Guba	Shot put	18.04	12 q	18.02	10
Klaudia Kardasz	Shot put	17.79	15	Did not advance	
Daria Zabawska	Discus throw	57.05	22	Did not advance	
Joanna Fiodorow	Hammer throw	73.39	3 Q	76.35 PB	2nd place, silver medalist(s)
Malwina Kopron	Hammer throw	70.46	13	Did not advance	
Maria Andrejczyk	Javelin throw	57.68	22	Did not advance	

=== Mixed ===
Track and road events

Athlete	Event	Heat		Semifinal		Final	
Athlete	Event	Result	Rank	Result	Rank	Result	Rank
Wiktor Suwara; Rafał Omelko; Iga Baumgart-Witan; Justyna Święty-Ersetic; Anna Kiełbasińska*; Małgorzata Hołub-Kowalik*	4 × 400 metres relay	3:15.47	5 Q	—		3:12.33 NR	5
