= 2014 European Athletics Championships – Men's 20 kilometres walk =

Men's 20 kilometres walk at the European Athletics Championships

The men's 20 kilometres race walk at the 2014 European Athletics Championships took place at the Letzigrund on 13 August.

== Medalists ==
Gold	Miguel Ángel López; Spain
Silver	Aleksandr Ivanov; Russia
Bronze	Denis Strelkov; Russia

== Records ==
Standing records prior to the 2014 European Athletics Championships
World record	Vladimir Kanaykin (RUS)	1:17:16	Saransk, Russia	29 September 2007
European record	Vladimir Kanaykin (RUS)	1:17:16	Saransk, Russia	29 September 2007
Championship record	Francisco Javier Fernández (ESP)	1:18:37	Munich, Germany	6 August 2002
World Leading	Yusuke Suzuki (JPN)	1:18:17	Kobe, Japan	16 February 2014
European Leading	Ruslan Dmytrenko (UKR)	1:18:37	Taicang, China	4 May 2014

== Schedule ==
Date	Time	Round
13 August 2014	09:20	Final

All times are local times (UTC+2)

== Results ==
Rank	Name	Nationality	Time	Note
1st place, gold medalist(s)	Miguel Ángel López	Spain	1:19:44	
2nd place, silver medalist(s)	Aleksandr Ivanov	Russia	1:19:45	PB
3rd place, bronze medalist(s)	Denis Strelkov	Russia	1:19:46	PB
4	Ruslan Dmytrenko	Ukraine	1:19:46	
5	Christopher Linke	Germany	1:21:00	SB
6	Álvaro Martín	Spain	1:21:41	
7	Andriy Kovenko	Ukraine	1:21:48	
8	Giorgio Rubino	Italy	1:22:07	
9	Erik Tysse	Norway	1:22:19	
10	Luís Alberto Amezcua	Spain	1:22:26	
11	Kevin Campion	France	1:23:04	
12	Tom Bosworth	Great Britain	1:23:17	
13	Dzianis Simanovich	Belarus	1:23:35	
14	Nazar Kovalenko	Ukraine	1:23:51	
15	Hagen Pohle	Germany	1:24:00	
16	Rafał Fedaczyński	Poland	1:24:28	
17	Perseus Karlström	Sweden	1:24:41	
18	Marius Šavelskis	Lithuania	1:24:54	PB
19	Matteo Giupponi	Italy	1:25:04	
20	Anton Kučmín	Slovakia	1:25:07	
21	Antonin Boyez	France	1:25:31	
22	Marius Žiūkas	Lithuania	1:25:43	
23	Arnis Rumbenieks	Latvia	1:27:07	
24	Genadij Kozlovskij	Lithuania	1:27:45	
25	Máté Helebrandt	Hungary	1:27:54	
26	Massimo Stano	Italy	1:29:14	
27	Nils Gloger	Germany	1:29:44	
28	Patrik Spevák	Slovakia	1:31:30	
	Andreas Gustafsson	Sweden	DNF	
	Alexandros Papamichail	Greece	DNF	
	Sándor Rácz	Hungary	DNF	
	João Vieira	Portugal	DNF	
	Sérgio Vieira	Portugal	DNF	
	Håvard Haukenes	Norway	DSQ	
