= 2009 European Athletics U23 Championships – Men's 20 kilometres walk =

The men's 20 kilometres race walk event at the 2009 European Athletics U23 Championships was held in Kaunas, Lithuania, on 18 July.

== Medalists ==
Gold	Miguel Ángel López; Spain
Silver	Dzianis Simanovich; Belarus
Bronze	Matteo Giupponi; Italy

== Results ==
=== Final ===
18 July

Rank	Name	Nationality	Time	Notes
1st place, gold medalist(s)	Miguel Ángel López	Spain	1:22:23	
2nd place, silver medalist(s)	Dzianis Simanovich	Belarus	1:22:57	
3rd place, bronze medalist(s)	Matteo Giupponi	Italy	1:23:00	
4	Christopher Linke	Germany	1:24:29	
5	Aleksey Bartsaykin	Russia	1:25:01	
6	Alexandros Papamihail	Greece	1:25:06	
7	Dawid Tomala	Poland	1:25:26	
8	Bertrand Moulinet	France	1:25:30	
9	Nazar Kovalenko	Ukraine	1:25:47	
10	Andrea Adragna	Italy	1:25:54	
11	Máté Helebrandt	Hungary	1:26:56	
12	Rafał Sikora	Poland	1:27:47	
13	Łukasz Nowak	Poland	1:28:21	
14	Federico Tontodonati	Italy	1:29:08	
15	Valerijus Grinko	Lithuania	1:30:38	
16	Damien Molmy	France	1:34:59	
	Tautvydas Žėkas	Lithuania	DNF	
	Arnik Rumbenieks	Latvia	DQ	Rule 230.6
	Ričardas Rekst	Lithuania	DQ	Rule 230.6
	Sergey Sergachev	Russia	DQ	Rule 230.6

== Participation ==
According to an unofficial count, 20 athletes from 12 countries participated in the event.

- Belarus (1)
- France (2)
- Germany (1)
- Greece (1)
- Hungary (1)
- Italy (3)
- Latvia (1)
- Lithuania (3)
- Poland (3)
- Russia (2)
- Spain (1)
- Ukraine (1)
