= Poland at the 2007 World Championships in Athletics =

- WA code: POL
- National federation: Polski Związek Lekkiej Atletyki
- Website: www.pzla.pl

in Osaka
- Competitors: 53
- Medals Ranked 35th: Gold 0 Silver 0 Bronze 3 Total 3

World Championships in Athletics appearances
- 1976; 1980; 1983; 1987; 1991; 1993; 1995; 1997; 1999; 2001; 2003; 2005; 2007; 2009; 2011; 2013; 2015; 2017; 2019; 2022; 2023; 2025

Poland competed at the 2007 World Championships in Athletics in Osaka, Japan, from 25 August – 2 September 2007.

== Medalists ==
Medal	Name	Event	Date
Bronze	Marek Plawgo	400 metres hurdles	28 August
Bronze	Anna Jesień	400 metres hurdles	30 August
Bronze	Marek Plawgo; Daniel Dąbrowski; Marcin Marciniszyn; Kacper Kozłowski; Rafał Wieruszewski (sf); Witold Bańka (sf)	4 × 400 metres relay	2 September

== Results ==
(q – qualified, NM – no mark, SB – season best)

=== Men ===
Track and road events

Athlete	Event	Heat		Quarterfinal		Semifinal		Final	
Athlete	Event	Result	Rank	Result	Rank	Result	Rank	Result	Rank
Dariusz Kuć	100 metres	10.42	5 q	10.37	6	did not advance			
Marcin Jędrusiński	200 metres	20.31 PB	4 Q	20.53	15 Q	20.54	7	did not advance	
Daniel Dąbrowski	400 metres	45.50	29	did not advance					
Marcin Marciniszyn	400 metres	45.83	34	did not advance					
Rafał Wieruszewski	400 metres	45.94	35	did not advance					
Marek Plawgo	400 metres hurdles	49.66	17 Q	—N/a		48.18 SB	1 Q	48.12	3rd place, bronze medalist(s)
Michał Bielczyk; Łukasz Chyła; Marcin Jędrusiński; Dariusz Kuć	4 × 100 metres relay	38.70	8 Q	—N/a				DNF	
Marek Plawgo; Daniel Dąbrowski; Marcin Marciniszyn; Kacper Kozłowski; Rafał Wieruszewski (sf); Witold Bańka (sf)	4 × 400 metres relay	3:02.39	7 Q	—N/a				3:00.76	3rd place, bronze medalist(s)
Benjamin Kuciński	20 kilometres walk	—N/a						1:26.43	17
Rafał Augustyn	20 kilometres walk	—N/a						1:27.54	26
Grzegorz Sudoł	50 kilometres walk	—N/a						4:07.48 SB	21
Rafał Fedaczyński	50 kilometres walk	—N/a						4:24.51	30
Kamil Kalka	50 kilometres walk	—N/a						DNF	

Field events

Athlete	Event	Qualification		Final	
Athlete	Event	Distance	Position	Distance	Position
Marcin Starzak	Long jump	7.92	6	did not advance	
Michał Bieniek	High jump	2.29	8 Q	2.21	11
Aleksander Waleriańczyk	High jump	2.19	12	did not advance	
Przemysław Czerwiński	Pole vault	DNF			
Tomasz Majewski	Shot put	20.25	4 Q	20.87 PB	4
Piotr Małachowski	Discus throw	63.20	4 q	60.77	12
Igor Janik	Javelin throw	80.83	5 q	83.38 PB	7
Szymon Ziółkowski	Hammer throw	78.90	2 Q	80.09	7

=== Women ===
Track and road events

Athlete	Event	Heat		Quarterfinal		Semifinal		Final	
Athlete	Event	Result	Rank	Result	Rank	Result	Rank	Result	Rank
Daria Korczyńska	100 metres	11.41	4 q	11.44	8	did not advance			
Monika Bejnar	200 metres	DNF							
Ewelina Klocek	200 metres	23.38	7 q	23.26 PB	6	did not advance			
Zuzanna Radecka	400 metres	52.19	25	did not advance					
Ewelina Sętowska-Dryk	800 metres	2:00.45	14 q	—N/a		2:01.02	20	did not advance	
Lidia Chojecka	1500 metres	4:09.52	3 Q	—N/a		4:05.80	5 q	4:08.64	8
Wioletta Frankiewicz	1500 metres	4:18.59	27	did not advance					
Aurelia Trywiańska	100 metres hurdles	13.05	23	did not advance					
Anna Jesień	400 metres hurdles	55.01	5 Q	—N/a		53.86 NR	3 Q	53.92	3rd place, bronze medalist(s)
Wioletta Frankiewicz	3000 metres steeplechase	9:43.96	2 Q	—N/a				DNF	
Katarzyna Kowalska	3000 metres steeplechase	9:58.74	11	—N/a				did not advance	
Marta Jeschke; Daria Korczyńska; Dorota Jędrusińska; Ewelina Klocek	4 × 100 metres relay	43.25 SB	8 q	—N/a				43.57	8
Zuzanna Radecka; Grażyna Prokopek; Ewelina Sętowska-Dryk; Anna Jesień; Agnieszka Karpiesiuk (sf)	4 × 400 metres relay	3:26.45	6 Q	—N/a				3:26.49	6
Sylwia Korzeniowska	20 kilometres walk	—N/a						1:37.38	23

Field events

Athlete	Event	Qualification		Final	
Athlete	Event	Distance	Position	Distance	Position
Małgorzata Trybańska	Long jump	6.49	9	did not advance	
Małgorzata Trybańska	Triple jump	13.90	9	did not advance	
Anna Rogowska	Pole vault	4.55 SB	6 Q	4.60 SB	8
Monika Pyrek	Pole vault	4.55 SB	1 Q	4.75 PB	4
Joanna Wiśniewska	Discus throw	63.13 SB	1 Q	61.35	6
Wioletta Potępa	Discus throw	59.20	9	did not advance	
Barbara Madejczyk	Javelin throw	60.86	2 q	58.37	9
Urszula Jasińska	Javelin throw	56.20	12	did not advance	
Kamila Skolimowska	Hammer throw	70.18	5 q	73.75	4

Combined events – Heptathlon

Athlete	Event	100H	HJ	SP	200 m	LJ	JT	800 m	Final	Rank
Kamila Chudzik	Result	14.27	1.71	13.31	25.00	5.84	52.03	2:23.03	5926	21
Kamila Chudzik	Points	941	867	748	887	801	899	783	5926	21
Karolina Tymińska	Result	14.09	1.71	13.25	24.02	6.34	35.97	2:08.27	6092	15
Karolina Tymińska	Points	966	867	744	979	956	590	990	6092	15
