= Poland at the 2005 World Championships in Athletics =

- WA code: POL
- National federation: Polski Związek Lekkiej Atletyki
- Website: www.pzla.pl

in Helsinki
- Competitors: 50
- Medals Ranked 13th: Gold 1 Silver 1 Bronze 0 Total 2

World Championships in Athletics appearances
- 1976; 1980; 1983; 1987; 1991; 1993; 1995; 1997; 1999; 2001; 2003; 2005; 2007; 2009; 2011; 2013; 2015; 2017; 2019; 2022; 2023; 2025

Poland competed at the 2005 World Championships in Athletics in Helsinki, Finland, from 6 – 14 August 2005.

== Medalists ==
Medal	Name	Event	Date
Gold	Szymon Ziółkowski	Hammer throw	8 August
Silver	Monika Pyrek	Pole vault	12 August

== Results ==
(q – qualified, NM – no mark, SB – season best)

=== Men ===
Track and road events

Athlete	Event	Heat		Quarterfinal		Semifinal		Final	
Athlete	Event	Result	Rank	Result	Rank	Result	Rank	Result	Rank
Łukasz Chyła	100 metres	10.39	5 q	DNS					
Marcin Jędrusiński	200 metres	20.14	2 Q	21.07	4 q	20.99	8	did not advance	
Marcin Marciniszyn	400 metres	45.97	4	did not advance					
Paweł Czapiewski	800 metres	1:46.93	5 Q	—N/a		1:46.33	4	did not advance	
Jakub Czaja	3000 metres steeplechase	DNF		—N/a		DNF			
Radosław Popławski	3000 metres steeplechase	8:29.85	8	—N/a		Dis not advance			
Michał Bielczyk; Marcin Nowak; Marcin Jędrusiński; Marcin Urbaś	4 × 100 metres relay	DNF		—N/a				DNF	
Piotr Klimczak; Robert Maćkowiak; Marcin Marciniszyn; Piotr Rysiukiewicz; Rafał Wieruszewski	4 × 400 metres relay	3:00.38 SB	3 q	—N/a				3:00.58	5
Rafał Wójcik	Marathon	—N/a						1:16.24	16
Rafał Dyś	20 kilometres walk	—N/a						1:26.35	26
Kamil Kalka	20 kilometres walk	—N/a						1:25.02	24
Benjamin Kuciński	20 kilometres walk	—N/a						1:20.34	7
Rafał Fedaczyński	50 kilometres walk	—N/a						DNF	
Roman Magdziarczyk	50 kilometres walk	—N/a						3:49.55 SB	7
Grzegorz Sudoł	50 kilometres walk	—N/a						DSQ	

Field events

Athlete	Event	Qualification		Final	
Athlete	Event	Distance	Position	Distance	Position
Grzegorz Sposób	High jump	2.20	10	did not advance	
Tomasz Majewski	Shot put	20.19	5 q	20.23	7
Andrzej Krawczyk	Discus throw	64.51	4 Q	62.71	12
Szymon Ziółkowski	Hammer throw	78.34	1 Q^{1}	79.35	(gold) ^{2}

^{1}, ^{2} Because of disqualification of Ivan Tsikhan and Vadim Devyatovskiy, Ziółkowski's place was changed from third to first.

=== Women ===
Track and road events

Athlete	Event	Heat		Semifinal		Final	
Athlete	Event	Result	Rank	Result	Rank	Result	Rank
Anna Guzowska	400 metres	52.20	5 q	52.45	8	did not advance	
Grażyna Prokopek	400 metres	52.39	5	did not advance			
Ewelina Sętowska-Dryk	800 metres	2:07.37	4 Q	2:02.02	4	did not advance	
Anna Jakubczak	1500 metres	4:44.28	3 Q	—N/a		4:03.38 SB	7
Wioletta Frankiewicz	1500 metres	4:09.90	8	—N/a		did not advance	
Aurelia Trywiańska	100 metres hurdles	12.86	3 Q	13.11	6	did not advance	
Anna Jesień	400 metres hurdles	55.79	1 Q	54.34	1 Q	54.17	4
Małgorzata Pskit	400 metres hurdles	55.72	2 Q	55.20	2 Q	55.58	8
Marta Chrust-Rożej	400 metres hurdles	56.35	1 Q	56.80	6	did not advance	
Wioletta Frankiewicz	3000 metres steeplechase	9:35.66	1 Q	—N/a		10:00.03	14
Iwona Brzezińska; Iwona Dorobisz; Dorota Dydo; Daria Onyśko	4 × 100 metres relay	43.37 SB	2 Q	—N/a		43.49	8
Anna Guzowska; Monika Bejnar; Grażyna Prokopek; Anna Jesień; Zuzanna Radecka (sf)	4 × 400 metres relay	3:26.04	2 Q	—N/a		3:24.49 NR	4
Dorota Gruca	Marathon	—N/a				2:27.46 PB	13

Field events

Athlete	Event	Qualification		Final	
Athlete	Event	Distance	Position	Distance	Position
Anna Rogowska	Pole vault	4.45	1 Q	4.35	6
Monika Pyrek	Pole vault	4.45 SB	1 Q	4.60	2nd place, silver medalist(s)
Joanna Wiśniewska	Discus throw	59.66	5 q	57.06	12
Wioletta Potępa	Discus throw	56.31	11	did not advance	
Marzena Wysocka	Discus throw	57.44	8	did not advance	
Barbara Madejczyk	Javelin throw	57.14	9	did not advance	
Kamila Skolimowska	Hammer throw	70.28	3 Q	68.96	6

Combined events – Heptathlon

Athlete	Event	100H	HJ	SP	200 m	LJ	JT	800 m	Final	Rank
Magdalena Szczepańska	Result	14.22	1.73	14.04	25.96	5.70	46.96	2;15.61	5880	19
Magdalena Szczepańska	Points	947	891	797	801	759	801	884	5880	19
