= Poland at the 1997 World Championships in Athletics =

- WA code: POL
- National federation: Polski Związek Lekkiej Atletyki
- Website: www.pzla.pl

in Athens
- Medals Ranked 14th: Gold 1 Silver 1 Bronze 1 Total 3

World Championships in Athletics appearances
- 1976; 1980; 1983; 1987; 1991; 1993; 1995; 1997; 1999; 2001; 2003; 2005; 2007; 2009; 2011; 2013; 2015; 2017; 2019; 2022; 2023; 2025

Poland competed at the 1997 World Championships in Athletics in Athens, Greece, from 1 – 10 August 1997.

== Medalists ==
| Medal | Name | Event | Date |
|---|---|---|---|
| Gold | Robert Korzeniowski | 50 kilometres walk | 7 August |
| Silver | Artur Partyka | High jump | 6 August |
| Bronze | Tomasz Czubak; Piotr Rysiukiewicz; Piotr Haczek; Robert Maćkowiak | 4 × 400 metres relay | 10 August |
