= Poland at the 1991 World Championships in Athletics =

- WA code: POL
- National federation: Polski Związek Lekkiej Atletyki
- Website: www.pzla.pl

in Tokyo
- Medals Ranked 12th: Gold 1 Silver 0 Bronze 0 Total 1

World Championships in Athletics appearances
- 1976; 1980; 1983; 1987; 1991; 1993; 1995; 1997; 1999; 2001; 2003; 2005; 2007; 2009; 2011; 2013; 2015; 2017; 2019; 2022; 2023; 2025

Poland competed at the 1991 World Championships in Athletics in Tokyo, Japan, from 23 August – 1 September 1991.

== Medalists ==
Medal	Name	Event	Date
Gold	Wanda Panfil	Marathon	25 August
