= Pedro Daniel Gómez =

Mexican racewalker

Personal information
- Nationality: Mexican
- Born: December 31, 1990 (age 35)
- Height: 1.78 m (5 ft 10 in)
- Weight: 70 kg (154 lb)

Sport
- Sport: Racewalking
- Event: 20 kilometres race walk

Achievements and titles
- Personal best: 20 km walk: 1:20:05 (2016)

Pedro Daniel Gómez (born 31 December 1990) is a Mexican racewalking athlete. He holds a personal best of 1:20:05 hours for the 20 kilometres race walk, set in 2016. He represented his country at the 2016 Summer Olympics. He also competed at the 2009 World Championships in Athletics and is a three-time participant at the IAAF World Race Walking Cup (2008, 2010, 2012).

Gómez competed internationally for Mexico in racewalking from a young age, coming fourth at the 2005 World Youth Championships in Athletics at the age of fourteen. Success came soon afterwards with silver medals at the 2006 Central American and Caribbean Youth Championships and the 2007 World Youth Championships. A gold medal came at the 2009 Pan American Junior Athletics Championships.

He began competing in the senior ranks in 2008. He took team gold at the 2009 Pan American Race Walking Cup, having finished fourth. A team bronze followed at the 2010 IAAF World Race Walking Cup. He placed in the top six at the Central American and Caribbean Games in both 2010 and 2014.

== Personal bests ==
- 5000 metres race walk – 19:11.86 min (2014)
- 10,000 metres race walk – 41:13.90 min (2011)
- 10 kilometres race walk – 40:02 min (2011)
- 20 kilometres race walk – 1:20:05 (2016)
- 50 kilometres race walk – 3:53:23 (2016)

All information from All-Athletics profile.

== International competitions ==
Year	Competition	Venue	Position	Event	Notes
2005	World Youth Championships	Marrakesh, Morocco	4th	10,000 m walk	44:01.54
2006	Central American and Caribbean Youth Championships	Port of Spain, Trinidad and Tobago	2nd	5000 m walk	22:50.59
2007	World Youth Championships	Ostrava, Czech Republic	2nd	10,000 m walk	43:11.87
2008	World Race Walking Cup	Cheboksary, Russia	44th	20 km walk	1:25:06
2008	World Race Walking Cup	Cheboksary, Russia	4th	Team	61 pts
2008	Ibero-American Championships	Iquique, Chile	6th	20 km walk	1:26:02.61
2008	World Junior Championships	Bydgoszcz, Poland	9th	10,000 m walk	42:53.38
2009	Pan American Race Walking Cup	San Salvador, El Salvador	4th	20 km walk	1:23:58
2009	Pan American Race Walking Cup	San Salvador, El Salvador	1st	Team	12 pts
2009	Pan American Junior Championships	Port of Spain, Trinidad and Tobago	1st	10,000 m walk	42:19.56
2009	World Championships	Berlin, Germany	27th	20 km walk	1:24:39
2010	World Race Walking Cup	Chihuahua, Mexico	14th	20 km walk	1:25:09
2010	World Race Walking Cup	Chihuahua, Mexico	3rd	Team	41 pts
2010	Central American and Caribbean Games	Mayagüez, Puerto Rico	5th	20 km walk	1:27:53
2012	World Race Walking Cup	Saransk, Russia	26th	20 km walk	1:23:40
2012	World Race Walking Cup	Saransk, Russia	6th	Team	78 pts
2014	Central American and Caribbean Games	Xalapa, Mexico	6th	20 km walk	1:40:45
2016	Olympic Games	Rio de Janeiro, Brazil	23rd	20 km walk	1:22:22
