= 2011 European Athletics U23 Championships – Men's 20 kilometres walk =

The Men's 20 kilometres walk event at the 2011 European Athletics U23 Championships was held in Ostrava, Czech Republic, at Městský stadion on 17 July.

== Medalists ==
Gold	Dawid Tomala; Poland
Silver	Denis Strelkov; Russia
Bronze	Valeriy Filipchuk; Russia

== Results ==
=== Final ===
17 July 2011 / 8:00

Rank	Name	Nationality	Time	Notes
1st place, gold medalist(s)	Dawid Tomala	Poland	1:24:21	
2nd place, silver medalist(s)	Denis Strelkov	Russia	1:24:25	
3rd place, bronze medalist(s)	Valeriy Filipchuk	Russia	1:24:30	
4	Máté Helebrandt	Hungary	1:25:14	SB
5	Federico Tontodonati	Italy	1:26:07	
6	Veli-Matti Partanen	Finland	1:26:37	SB
7	Riccardo Macchia	Italy	1:28:31	
8	Andrea Adragna	Italy	1:29:13	
9	Wojciech Halman	Poland	1:29:46	
10	Aliaksandr Liakhovich	Belarus	1:30:22	
11	Genadij Kozlovskij	Lithuania	1:31:05	
	Perseus Karlström	Sweden	DNF	
	Carl Dohmann	Germany	DQ	R 230.6
	Dawid Wolski	Poland	DQ	R 230.6
	Petr Bogatyrev	Russia	DQ	R 32.2.b Doping^{†}

^{†}: Petr Bogatyrev ranked initially 1st (1:24:20), but was disqualified later for infringement of IAAF doping rules.

Intermediate times:
2 km: 8:53 Veli-Matti Partanen Finland
4 km: 17:25 Veli-Matti Partanen Finland
6 km: 26:02 Veli-Matti Partanen Finland
8 km: 34:25 Veli-Matti Partanen Finland
10 km: 42:54 Veli-Matti Partanen Finland
12 km: 51:27 Máté Helebrandt Hungary
14 km: 59:57 Máté Helebrandt Hungary
16 km: 1:08:15 Petr Bogatyrev Russia
18 km: 1:16:18 Petr Bogatyrev Russia

== Participation ==
According to an unofficial count, 15 athletes from 9 countries participated in the event.

- Belarus (1)
- Finland (1)
- Germany (1)
- Hungary (1)
- Italy (3)
- Lithuania (1)
- Poland (3)
- Russia (3)
- Sweden (1)
