= Poland at the 1999 World Championships in Athletics =

- WA code: POL
- National federation: Polski Związek Lekkiej Atletyki
- Website: www.pzla.pl

in Seville
- Medals Ranked 18th: Gold 1 Silver 0 Bronze 0 Total 1

World Championships in Athletics appearances
- 1976; 1980; 1983; 1987; 1991; 1993; 1995; 1997; 1999; 2001; 2003; 2005; 2007; 2009; 2011; 2013; 2015; 2017; 2019; 2022; 2023; 2025

Poland competed at the 1999 World Championships in Athletics in Seville, Spain, from 20 – 29 August 1999.

== Medalists ==
Medal	Name	Event	Date
Gold	Tomasz Czubak; Robert Maćkowiak; Jacek Bocian; Piotr Haczek	4 × 400 metres relay	29 August

== Results ==
(Q, q – qualified, NM – no mark, SB – season best)

=== Men ===
Track and road events

Athlete	Event	Heat		Quarterfinal		Semifinal		Final	
Athlete	Event	Result	Rank	Result	Rank	Result	Rank	Result	Rank
Piotr Balcerzak	100 metres	10.23	2 Q	10.29	7	DNS			
Marcin Nowak	100 metres	10.23	4 q	10.29	6	DNS			
Marcin Urbaś	100 metres	20.80	2 Q	20.32	3 Q	19.98	2 Q NR	20.30	5
Tomasz Czubak	400 metres	45.13	1 Q	45.27	2 Q	44.62	6 NR	did not advance	
Robert Maćkowiak	400 metres	45.51	3 Q	45.23	4	did not advance			
Piotr Rysiukiewicz	400 metres	46.12	3 Q	45.54	2 Q	DNF		did not advance	
Wojciech Kałdowski	800 metres	1:46.88	2 Q	—		1:46.49	5	did not advance	
Tomasz Ścigaczewski	110 metres hurdles	13.54	2 Q	13.54	5	did not advance			
Paweł Januszewski	400 metres hurdles	49.21	2 Q	—		48.63	2 Q	48.19	5
Rafał Wójcik	3000 metres steeplechase	8:34.45	11	Dis not advance					
Marcin Krzywański; Marcin Urbaś; Piotr Balcerzak; Marcin Nowak	4 × 100 metres relay	38.75 SB	2 Q	—				38.70 SB	5
Tomasz Czubak; Robert Maćkowiak; Jacek Bocian; Piotr Haczek; Piotr Długosielski	4 × 400 metres relay	3:00.86 SB	2 Q	—				2:58.91 SB	1st place, gold medalist(s)
Robert Korzeniowski	50 kilometres walk	—						DSQ	
Tomasz Lipiec	50 kilometres walk	—						DSQ	
Roman Magdziarczyk	50 kilometres walk	—						4:05:10	19

Field events

Athlete	Event	Qualification		Final	
Athlete	Event	Distance	Position	Distance	Position
Andrzej Krawczyk	Discus throw	59.48	21	Did not advance	
Maciej Pałyszko	Hammer throw	72.05	29	Did not advance	
Szymon Ziółkowski	Hammer throw	74.12	23	Did not advance	
Dariusz Trafas	Javelin throw	78.43	18	Did not advance	

=== Women ===
Track and road events

Athlete	Event	Heat		Quarterfinal		Semifinal		Final	
Athlete	Event	Result	Rank	Result	Rank	Result	Rank	Result	Rank
Zuzanna Radecka	200 metres	23.01	2 Q	22.96	6	did not advance			
Lidia Chojecka	1500 metres	4:05.16	7 q	—				4:05.55	9
Anna Jakubczak	1500 metres	4:05.71	5 Q	—				4:04.40	7
Zuzanna Radecka; Irena Sznajder; Monika Borejza; Joanna Balcerczak; Marzena Pawlak	4 × 100 metres relay	43.73	2 Q	—				43.51	7
Katarzyna Radtke	20 kilometres walk	—						1:31:34	5

Field events

Athlete	Event	Qualification		Final	
Athlete	Event	Distance	Position	Distance	Position
Donata Jancewicz-Wawrzyniak	High jump	DNS		did not advance	
Agata Kaczmarek	Long jump	6.58	14	did not advance	
Krystyna Danilczyk-Zabawska	Shot put	18.49	5 q	18.12	8
Joanna Wiśniewska	Discus throw	59.83	17	did not advance	
Marzena Wysocka	Discus throw	57.43	25	did not advance	
Kamila Skolimowska	Hammer throw	—		50.38	21
Genowefa Patla	Javelin throw	59.50	13	did not advance	
Ewa Rybak	Javelin throw	56.41	22	did not advance	

Combined events – Heptathlon

Athlete	Event	100H	HJ	SP	200 m	LJ	JT	800 m	Final	Rank
Urszula Włodarczyk	Result	13.71	1.81	14.55	24.20	6.08	43.27	2:15.95	6287	7
Urszula Włodarczyk	Points	947	891	797	801	759	801	884	6287	7
