= Miguel Ángel López (race walker) =

Spanish race walker (born 1988)

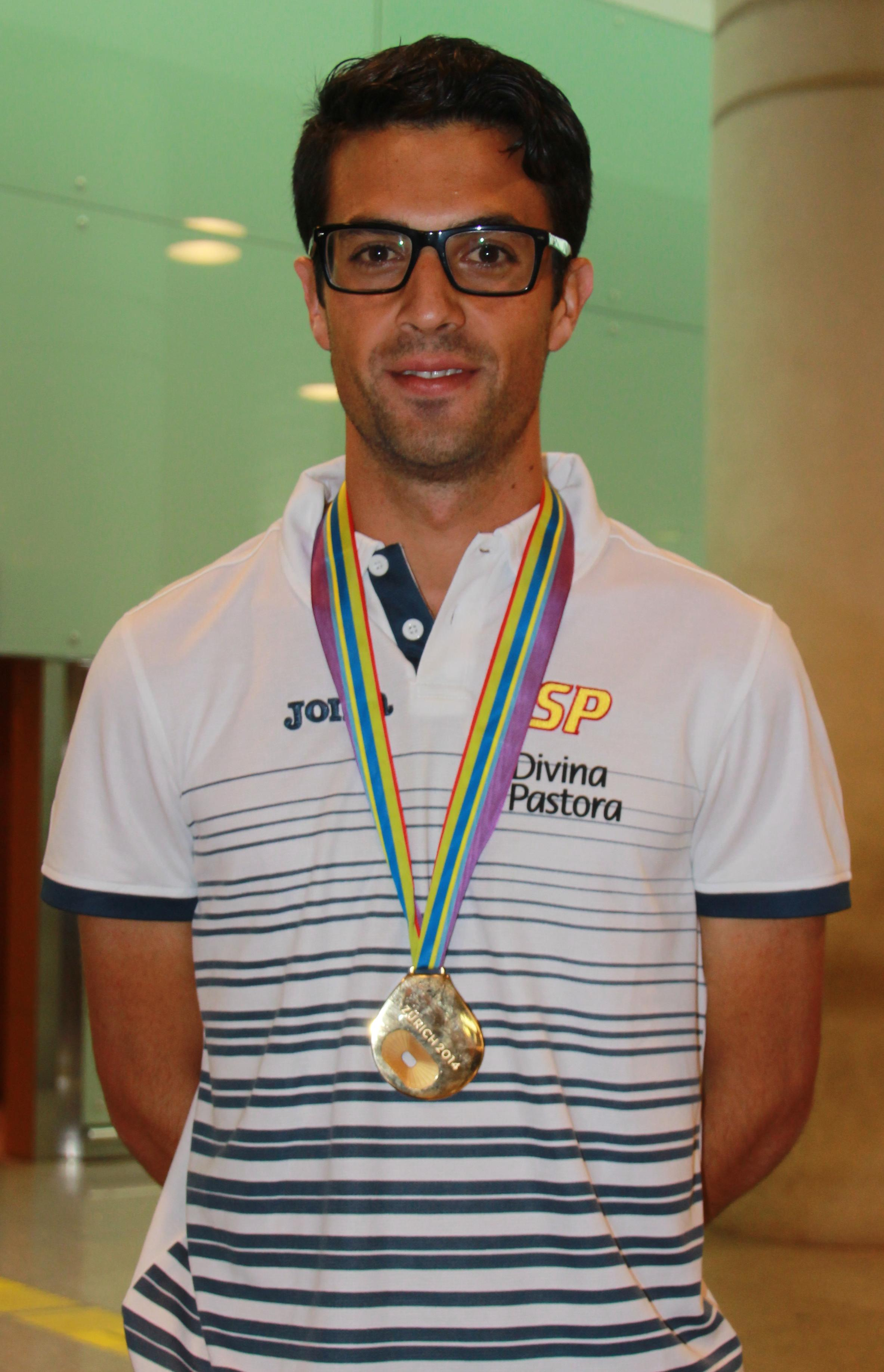

Personal information
- Full name: Miguel Ángel López Nicolás
- Nationality: Spanish
- Born: 3 July 1988 (age 38) Murcia, Spain
- Height: 181 cm (5 ft 11 in)
- Weight: 70 kg (154 lb)
Medal record
Men's athletics
Representing Spain
World Championships
| Gold medal – first place | 2015 Beijing | 20 km walk |
| Silver medal – second place | 2013 Moscow | 20 km walk |
European Championships
| Gold medal – first place | 2014 Zurich | 20 km walk |
| Gold medal – first place | 2022 Munich | 35 km walk |
| Silver medal – second place | 2026 Birmingham | Marathon race walk |
European Race Walking Team Championships
| Bronze medal – third place | 2025 Poděbrady | 35 km walk |
European Athletics U23 Championships
| Gold medal – first place | 2009 Kaunas | 20 km walk |

Miguel Ángel López Nicolás (born 3 July 1988) is a Spanish race walker. He won the gold medal in the 20 km race walk at the 2015 World Championships and the silver in 2013. He competed in the 20 km walk at the 2012 Summer Olympics, where he placed fifth, and the 50 km walk at the 2016 Olympics, where he was one of 11 walkers who did not finish amid "punishingly hot and humid conditions".

== Competition record ==
| Year | Competition | Venue | Position | Event | Notes |
Representing Spain
| 2005 | World Youth Championships | Marrakesh, Morocco | 6th | 10,000 m walk | 44:16.70 |
| 2005 | European Junior Championships | Kaunas, Lithuania | 9th | 10,000 m walk | 42:49.72 |
| 2006 | World Junior Championships | Beijing, China | 14th | 10,000 m walk | 45:54.41 |
| 2007 | European Junior Championships | Hengelo, Netherlands | 8th | 10,000 m walk | 42:36.60 |
| 2008 | World Race Walking Cup | Cheboksary, Russia | 35th | 20 km walk | 1:23:44 |
| 2008 | Ibero-American Championships | Iquique, Chile | 4th | 20 km walk | 1:24:52.51 |
| 2009 | European U23 Championships | Kaunas, Lithuania | 1st | 20 km walk | 1:22:23 |
| 2010 | World Race Walking Cup | Chihuahua, Mexico | 13th | 20 km walk | 1:24:32 |
| 2010 | European Championships | Barcelona, Spain | 13th | 20 km walk | 1:24:28 |
| 2011 | World Championships | Daegu, South Korea | 17th | 20 km walk | 1:23:41 |
| 2012 | World Race Walking Cup | Saransk, Russia | 42nd | 20 km walk | 1:25:31 |
| 2012 | Olympic Games | London, United Kingdom | 5th | 20 km walk | 1:19:49 |
| 2013 | World Championships | Moscow, Russia | 2nd | 20 km walk | 1:21:21 |
| 2014 | World Race Walking Cup | Taicang, China | 5th | 20 km walk | 1:19:21 |
| 2014 | European Championships | Zurich, Switzerland | 1st | 20 km walk | 1:19:44 |
| 2015 | World Championships | Beijing, China | 1st | 20 km walk | 1:19:14 |
| 2016 | World Race Walking Cup | Rome, Italy | 33rd | 20 km walk | 1:22:46 |
| 2016 | Olympic Games | Rio de Janeiro, Brazil | 11th | 20 km walk | 1:20:58 |
| 2016 | Olympic Games | Rio de Janeiro, Brazil | — | 50 km walk | DNF |
| 2017 | World Championships | London, United Kingdom | 10th | 20 km walk | 1:19:57 |
| 2018 | World Race Walking Championships | Taicang, China | 5th | 20 km walk | 1:19:21 |
| 2018 | European Championships | Berlin, Germany | 6th | 20 km walk | 1:19:27 |
| 2019 | World Championships | Doha, Qatar | 26th | 20 km walk | 1:35:00 |
| 2021 | Olympic Games | Sapporo, Japan | 31st | 20 km | 1:27:12 |
| 2022 | World Race Walking Championships | Muscat, Oman | 3rd | 35 km | 2:37:27 |
| 2022 | World Championships | Eugene, United States | 10th | 35 km | 2:25:58 |
| 2022 | European Athletics Championships | Munich, Germany | 1st | 35 km | 2:26:49 |
