= Máté Helebrandt =

Hungarian racewalker

Personal information
- Born: 12 January 1989 (age 37) Nyíregyháza, Hungary

Sport
- Country: Hungary
- Sport: Athletics
- Event: Racewalking

Máté Helebrandt (born 12 January 1989 in Nyíregyháza) is a Hungarian racewalker. He competed in the 20 km walk at the 2012 Summer Olympics, where he placed 32nd, and the 2016 Olympics where he came 28th in the same event.

In 2018, he competed in the men's 50 kilometres walk at the 2018 European Athletics Championships held in Berlin, Germany. He did not finish his race. In 2019, he competed in the men's 50 kilometres walk at the 2019 World Athletics Championships held in Doha, Qatar. He did not finish his race.

Helebrandt represented Hungary in the men's 50 kilometres walk at the 2020 Summer Olympics, where he placed 17th and set a season best.

== Competition record ==
Year	Competition	Venue	Position	Event	Notes
Representing Hungary
2007	European Race Walking Cup	Royal Leamington Spa, United Kingdom	14th	10 km walk	43:23
2007	European Junior Championships	Hengelo, Netherlands	11th	10,000 m walk	43:33.73
2008	World Race Walking Cup	Cheboksary, Russia	11th	10 km walk	42:39
2008	World Junior Championships	Bydgoszcz, Poland	—	10,000 m walk	DQ
2009	European Race Walking Cup	Metz, France	28th	20 km walk	1:39:10
2009	European U23 Championships	Kaunas, Lithuania	11th	20 km walk	1:26:56
2010	World Race Walking Cup	Chihuahua, Mexico	48th	20 km walk	1:31:42
2010	European Championships	Barcelona, Spain	–	20 km walk	DNF
2011	European Race Walking Cup	Olhão, Portugal	–	20 km walk	DNF
2011	European U23 Championships	Ostrava, Czech Republic	4th	20 km walk	1:25:14
2012	World Race Walking Cup	Saransk, Russia	62nd	20 km walk	1:27:39
2012	Olympic Games	London, United Kingdom	32nd	20 km walk	1:23:32
2013	European Race Walking Cup	Dudince, Slovakia	38th	20 km walk	1:30:16
2013	World Championships	Moscow, Russia	41st	20 km walk	1:28:49
2014	World Race Walking Cup	Taicang, China	59th	20 km walk	1:24:03
2014	European Championships	Zürich, Switzerland	25th	20 km walk	1:27:54
2015	Universiade	Gwangju, South Korea	4th	20 km walk	1:23:50
2016	Olympic Games	Rio de Janeiro, Brazil	28th	20 km walk	1:22:31
