= Poland at the 2015 World Championships in Athletics =

- WA code: POL
- National federation: Polski Związek Lekkiej Atletyki
- Website: www.pzla.pl

in Beijing
- Competitors: 48
- Medals Ranked 6th: Gold 3 Silver 1 Bronze 4 Total 8

World Championships in Athletics appearances
- 1976; 1980; 1983; 1987; 1991; 1993; 1995; 1997; 1999; 2001; 2003; 2005; 2007; 2009; 2011; 2013; 2015; 2017; 2019; 2022; 2023; 2025

Poland competed at the 2015 World Championships in Athletics in Beijing, China, from 22–30 August 2015.

== Medalists ==
Medal	Name	Event	Date
Gold	Paweł Fajdek	Hammer throw	23 August
Gold	Anita Włodarczyk	Hammer throw	27 August
Gold	Piotr Małachowski	Discus throw	29 August
Silver	Adam Kszczot	800 metres	25 August
Bronze	Wojciech Nowicki	Hammer throw	23 August
Bronze	Paweł Wojciechowski	Pole vault	24 August
Bronze	Piotr Lisek	Pole vault	24 August
Bronze	Robert Urbanek	Discus throw	29 August

== Results ==
(q – qualified, NM – no mark, SB – season best, PB – personal best)

=== Men ===
Track and road events

Athlete	Event	Heat		Semifinal		Final	
Athlete	Event	Result	Rank	Result	Rank	Result	Rank
Karol Zalewski	200 metres	20.77	40	did not advance			
Adam Kszczot	800 metres	1:46.62	9 Q	1:44.97	3 Q	1:46.08	2nd place, silver medalist(s)
Marcin Lewandowski	800 metres	1:46.25	7 q	1:45.34	7	did not advance	
Artur Kuciapski	800 metres	1:49.22	39	did not advance			
Artur Noga	110 metres hurdles	13.49	20 Q	13.37 SB	12	did not advance	
Patryk Dobek	400 metres hurdles	48.94	8 Q	48.40 PB	4 q	49.14	7
Krystian Zalewski	3000 metres steeplechase	8:25.10	4 q	—N/a		8:21.22 SB	9
Jakub Krzewina; Łukasz Krawczuk; Rafał Omelko; Michał Pietrzak	4 × 400 metres relay	3:00.72 SB	11	—N/a		did not advance	
Rafał Augustyn	50 kilometres walk	—N/a				3:57.30	28
Łukasz Nowak	50 kilometres walk	—N/a				DNF	
Adrian Błocki	50 kilometres walk	—N/a				3:49.11 PB	11

Field events

Athlete	Event	Qualification		Final	
Athlete	Event	Distance	Position	Distance	Position
Sylwester Bednarek	High jump	2.22	33	did not advance	
Paweł Wojciechowski	Pole vault	5.70	1 Q	5.80	3rd place, bronze medalist(s)
Piotr Lisek	Pole vault	5.70	7 Q	5.80	3rd place, bronze medalist(s)
Robert Sobera	Pole vault	5.70	1 Q	5.50	15
Tomasz Majewski	Shot put	20.34	10 q	20.82 SB	6
Konrad Bukowiecki	Shot put	NM		did not advance	
Piotr Małachowski	Discus throw	65.59	2 Q	67.40	1st place, gold medalist(s)
Robert Urbanek	Discus throw	64.23	5 q	65.18	3rd place, bronze medalist(s)
Paweł Fajdek	Hammer throw	78.38	1 Q	80.88	1st place, gold medalist(s)
Wojciech Nowicki	Hammer throw	76.72	4 q	78.55	3rd place, bronze medalist(s)
Marcin Krukowski	Javelin throw	78.91	21	did not advance	

Combined events – Decathlon

Athlete	Event	100 m	LJ	SP	HJ	400 m	110H	DT	PV	JT	1500 m	Final	Rank
Paweł Wiesiołek	Result	11.07	7.08	13.50	1.98	48.55 PB	14.82	41.55	4.50	54.08	4:39.31	7705	17
Paweł Wiesiołek	Points	845	833	698	785	883	871	696	760	649	685	7705	17

=== Women ===
Track and road events

Athlete	Event	Heat		Semifinal		Final	
Athlete	Event	Result	Rank	Result	Rank	Result	Rank
Anna Kiełbasińska	200 metres	22.95	15 q	23.07	21	did not advance	
Iga Baumgart	400 metres	52.02 PB	28	did not advance			
Patrycja Wyciszkiewicz	400 metres	51.31 PB	17 Q	51.94	21	did not advance	
Małgorzata Hołub	400 metres	51.74 PB	25	did not advance			
Joanna Jóźwik	800 metres	2:01.62	30 Q	1:58.35 PB	4 q	1:59.09	7
Sofia Ennaoui	800 metres	2:01.16	22 Q	2:00.11 PB	18	Did not advance	
Sofia Ennaoui	1500 metres	4:06.94	17 q	4:16.70	17	Did not advance	
Renata Pliś	1500 metres	4:05.89	13 q	4:15.10	11	Did not advance	
Angelika Cichocka	1500 metres	4:11.08	27 Q	4:09.19	7 q	4:13.22	8
Karolina Kołeczek	100 metres hurdles	13.05	20 Q	12.97	15	Did not advance	
Joanna Linkiewicz	400 metres hurdles	56.51	25	did not advance			
Marta Jeschke; Anna Kiełbasińska; Agata Forkasiewicz; Weronika Wedler	4 × 100 metres relay	43.20 SB	11	—N/a		did not advance	
Patrycja Wyciszkiewicz; Małgorzata Hołub; Joanna Linkiewicz; Justyna Święty	4 × 400 metres relay	3:32.83	15	—N/a		did not advance	
Agnieszka Dygacz	20 kilometres walk	—N/a				1:39:06	38

Field events

Athlete	Event	Qualification		Final	
Athlete	Event	Distance	Position	Distance	Position
Kamila Lićwinko	High jump	1.92	9 q	1.99 =NR	4
Paulina Guba	Shot put	17.73	12 q	17.52	11
Anita Włodarczyk	Hammer throw	75.01	1 Q	80.85 CR	1st place, gold medalist(s)
Joanna Fiodorow	Hammer throw	68.72	17	did not advance	
Malwina Kopron	Hammer throw	69.53	14	did not advance	
Maria Andrejczyk	Javelin throw	56.75	28	did not advance	

Combined events – Heptathlon

Athlete	Event	100H	HJ	SP	200 m	LJ	JT	800 m	Final	Rank
Karolina Tymińska	Result	13.52 SB	1.65	13.79	24.15	6.08	34.66	2:13.04	5948	20
Karolina Tymińska	Points	1047	795	780	966	874	565	921	5948	20
