= Poland at the 2011 World Championships in Athletics =

- WA code: POL
- National federation: Polski Związek Lekkiej Atletyki
- Website: www.pzla.pl

in Daegu
- Competitors: 37
- Medals Ranked 11th: Gold 1 Silver 0 Bronze 1 Total 2

World Championships in Athletics appearances
- 1976; 1980; 1983; 1987; 1991; 1993; 1995; 1997; 1999; 2001; 2003; 2005; 2007; 2009; 2011; 2013; 2015; 2017; 2019; 2022; 2023

Poland competed at the 2011 World Championships in Athletics from August 27 to September 4 in Daegu, South Korea.

== Team selection ==
A team of 43 athletes was announced to represent the country in the event. The team is led by the defending champions, pole vaulter Anna Rogowska and hammer thrower Anita Włodarczyk.

The following athletes appeared on the preliminary Entry List, but not on the Official Start List of the specific event, resulting in a total number of 37 competitors:

KEY:	Did not participate	Competed in another event

	Event	Athlete
Men	4 x 100 metres relay	Kamil Masztak
Men	4 x 100 metres relay	Artur Zaczek
Men	4 x 400 metres relay	Mateusz Fórmański
Men	4 x 400 metres relay	Jan Ciepiela
Women	4 x 100 metres relay	Ewelina Ptak
Women	4 x 100 metres relay	Dorota Jędrusińska

== Medalists ==
Medal	Name	Event	Date
Gold	Paweł Wojciechowski	Pole vault	29 August
Bronze	Karolina Tymińska	Women's Heptathlon	30 August

== Results ==
=== Men ===
Athlete	Event	Preliminaries		Heats		Semifinals		Final	
Athlete	Event	Time Width Height	Rank	Time Width Height	Rank	Time Width Height	Rank	Time Width Height	Rank
Dariusz Kuć	100 metres	—		10.36	21 Q	10.51	23	Did not advance	
Marcin Marciniszyn	400 metres	—		45.51	18 Q	45.94	18	Did not advance	
Adam Kszczot	800 metres	—		1:46.16	7 Q	1:44.81	5 Q	1:45.25	6
Marcin Lewandowski	800 metres	—		1:46.73	17 Q	1:44.60	3 Q	1:44.80	4
Dominik Bochenek	110 m hurdles	—		13.96	29	Did not advance			
Łukasz Parszczyński	3000 metres steeplechase	—		8:44.09	31	—		Did not advance	
Paweł Stempel; Dariusz Kuć; Robert Kubaczyk; Kamil Kryński	4 x 100 metres relay	—		38.37 SB	5 Q	—		38.50	4
Kacper Kozłowski; Piotr Wiaderek; Jakub Krzewina; Marcin Marciniszyn	4 x 400 metres relay	—		3:01.84	11	—		Did not advance	
Rafał Augustyn	20 kilometres walk	—		—				1:24:47	24
Rafał Sikora	50 kilometres walk	—		—				3:50:24	13
Rafał Fedaczyński	50 kilometres walk	—		—				DSQ	
Grzegorz Sudoł	50 kilometres walk	—		—				DNF	
Mateusz Didenkow	Pole vault	5.65	8 q	—				5.75	7
Łukasz Michalski	Pole vault	5.60	10 q	—				5.85	4
Paweł Wojciechowski	Pole vault	5.50	12 q	—				5.90	1st place, gold medalist(s)
Tomasz Majewski	Shot put	20.73	6 Q	—				20.18	9
Piotr Małachowski	Discus throw	65.48	1 q	—				63.37	9
Paweł Fajdek	Hammer throw	76.10	11 q	—				75.20	11
Szymon Ziółkowski	Hammer throw	77.19	5 Q	—				77.64	7
Igor Janik	Javelin throw	80.88	13	—				Did not advance	

=== Women ===
Athlete	Event	Preliminaries		Heats		Semifinals		Final	
Athlete	Event	Time Width Height	Rank	Time Width Height	Rank	Time Width Height	Rank	Time Width Height	Rank
Marta Jeschke	100 metres	—		11.73	38	Did not advance			
Anna Kiełbasińska	200 metres	—		23.34	25	Did not advance			
Renata Pliś	1500 metres	—		4:08.83	10 q	4:11.12	20	Did not advance	
Anna Kiełbasińska; Marika Popowicz; Marta Jeschke; Agnieszka Ligięza	4 x 100 metres relay	—		DNF		Did not advance			
Teresa Dobija	Long jump	6.30	22	—				Did not advance	
Anna Jagaciak	Triple jump	13.57	28	—				Did not advance	
Anna Rogowska	Pole vault	4.55	1 q	—				4.55	10
Monika Pyrek	Pole vault	4.50	11 q	—				4.55	10
Żaneta Glanc	Discus throw	63.44	4 Q	—				63.91	4
Anita Włodarczyk	Hammer throw	71.09	7	—				73.56 SB	5
Joanna Fiodorow	Hammer throw	66.88	21	—				Did not advance	

Combined events – Heptathlon

Athlete	Event	100H	HJ	SP	200 m	LJ	JT	800 m	Final	Rank
Karolina Tymińska	Result	13.12 PB	1.74 SB	14.70 SB	23.87	6.39	41.32 PB	2:05.21 PB	6544 PB	3rd place, bronze medalist(s)
Karolina Tymińska	Points	1106	903	841	993	972	693	1036	6544 PB	3rd place, bronze medalist(s)
