= 2008 World Junior Championships in Athletics – Men's 10,000 metres walk =

The men's 10,000 metres walk event at the 2008 World Junior Championships in Athletics was held in Bydgoszcz, Poland, at Zawisza Stadium on 11 July.

== Medalists ==
Gold	Stanislav Emelyanov; Russia
Silver	Chen Ding; China
Bronze	Lluís Torlá; Spain

== Results ==
=== Final ===
11 July

Rank	Name	Nationality	Time	Notes
1st place, gold medalist(s)	Stanislav Emelyanov	Russia	39:35.01	
2nd place, silver medalist(s)	Chen Ding	China	39:47.20	
3rd place, bronze medalist(s)	Lluís Torlá	Spain	40:29.57	
4	Aleksey Barchaykin	Russia	41:14.90	
5	Geng Lingfu	China	41:57.69	
6	Caio Bonfim	Brazil	42:18.33	
7	Hédi Taraaoui	Tunisia	42:18.65	
8	Dawid Tomala	Poland	42:33.60	
9	Pedro Daniel Gómez	Mexico	42:53.38	
10	Evan Dunfee	Canada	42:56.82	
11	Hiroki Nagaiwa	Japan	43:16.52	
12	Alfonso Bran	Guatemala	43:19.94	
13	Veli-Matti Partanen	Finland	43:53.09	
14	Ricardo Lojan	Ecuador	43:53.63	
15	Federico Tontodonati	Italy	44:02.78	
16	Mehdu Boufraine	France	44:17.10	
17	Genadij Kozlovskij	Lithuania	44:27.87	
18	Aliaksandr Lyakhovich	Belarus	44:35.17	
19	Manel Torlá	Spain	44:50.64	
20	Paul Fitzpatrick	Ireland	44:52.12	
21	Wojciech Halman	Poland	44:59.54	
22	José Leonardo Montaña	Colombia	45:06.00	
23	Julián Rendón	Colombia	45:07.08	
24	Luís Lopes	Portugal	45:21.32	
25	Riccardo Macchia	Italy	45:25.10	
26	Adrian Ochoa	Mexico	45:40.33	
27	Dejaime de Oliveira	Brazil	45:54.66	
28	Ki Kwang-Yun	South Korea	45:55.71	
29	Louis Blanc	France	46:41.48	
30	Perseus Ibáñez	Sweden	47:19.88	
	Maher Ben Hlima	Tunisia	DQ	
	Máté Helebrandt	Hungary	DQ	
	Mihaíl Yelastós	Greece	DQ	
	Alexander Velázquez	Guatemala	DQ	
	Emerson Hernández	El Salvador	DNF	

== Participation ==
According to an unofficial count, 35 athletes from 24 countries participated in the event.

- Belarus (1)
- Brazil (2)
- Canada (1)
- China (2)
- Colombia (2)
- Ecuador (1)
- El Salvador (1)
- Finland (1)
- France (2)
- Greece (1)
- Guatemala (2)
- Hungary (1)
- Ireland (1)
- Italy (2)
- Japan (1)
- Lithuania (1)
- Mexico (2)
- Poland (2)
- Portugal (1)
- Russia (2)
- South Korea (1)
- Spain (2)
- Sweden (1)
- Tunisia (2)
