= Poland at the 1995 World Championships in Athletics =

- WA code: POL
- National federation: Polski Związek Lekkiej Atletyki
- Website: www.pzla.pl

in Gothenburg
- Medals Ranked 36th: Gold 0 Silver 0 Bronze 2 Total 2

World Championships in Athletics appearances
- 1976; 1980; 1983; 1987; 1991; 1993; 1995; 1997; 1999; 2001; 2003; 2005; 2007; 2009; 2011; 2013; 2015; 2017; 2019; 2022; 2023; 2025

Poland competed at the 1995 World Championships in Athletics in Gothenburg, Sweden, from 5 – 13 August 1995. It got 2 bronze medals.

== Medalists ==
Medal	Name	Event	Date
Bronze	Artur Partyka	High jump	8 August
Bronze	Robert Korzeniowski	50 kilometres walk	10 August
