= Poland at the 2001 World Championships in Athletics =

- WA code: POL
- National federation: Polski Związek Lekkiej Atletyki
- Website: www.pzla.pl

in Edmonton
- Medals Ranked 11th: Gold 2 Silver 0 Bronze 3 Total 5

World Championships in Athletics appearances
- 1976; 1980; 1983; 1987; 1991; 1993; 1995; 1997; 1999; 2001; 2003; 2005; 2007; 2009; 2011; 2013; 2015; 2017; 2019; 2022; 2023; 2025

Poland competed at the 2001 World Championships in Athletics in Edmonton, Canada, from 3 – 12 August 2001.

== Medalists ==
Medal	Name	Event	Date
Gold	Szymon Ziółkowski	Hammer throw	5 August
Gold	Robert Korzeniowski	50 kilometres walk	11 August
Bronze	Monika Pyrek	Pole vault	6 August
Bronze	Paweł Czapiewski	800 metres	7 August
Bronze	Rafał Wieruszewski; Piotr Haczek; Piotr Długosielski; Piotr Rysiukiewicz	4 × 400 metres relay	12 August
