= Denis Strelkov =

Russian race walker

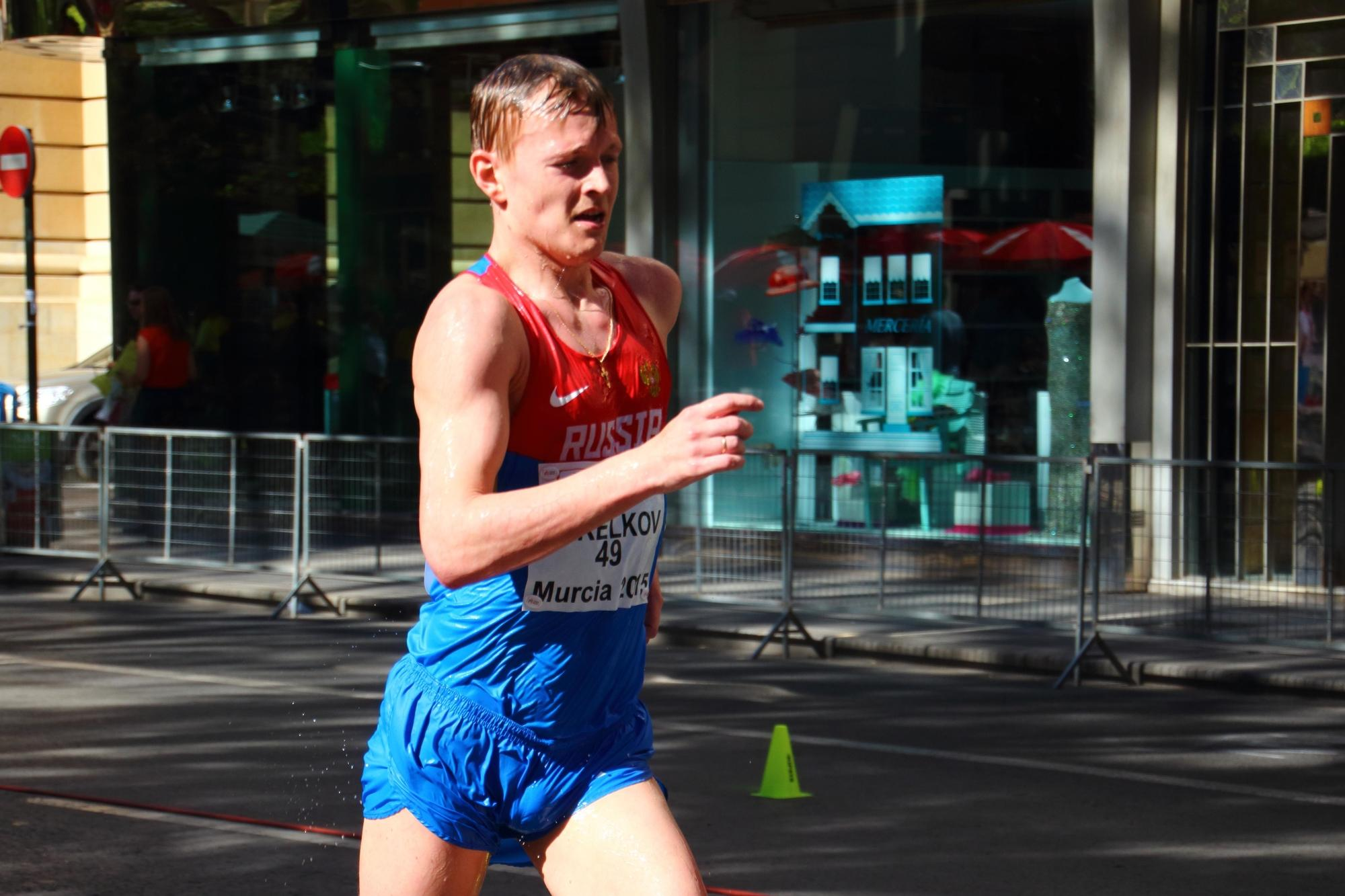
- Strelkov at the 2015 European Cup Race Walking

Medal record

Men's athletics

Representing Russia

European Championships
Bronze medal – third place	2014 Zurich	20 km walk

Denis Sergeyevich Strelkov (Russian: Денис Сергеевич Стрелков; born 26 October 1990) is a Russian race walker. He won the bronze medal in the 20-kilometre walk at the 2014 European Championships in Athletics. He continues to be coached by Viktor Chegin, after he has been suspended for a lengthy series of performance-enhancing drug suspensions against many of his athletes.

== Doping case ==
In September 2015 IAAF confirmed that Strelkov was provisionally suspended after a sample from an out-of-competition control in Saransk in June had been found positive for a prohibited substance.

== Competition record ==
Year	Competition	Venue	Position	Event	Notes
Representing Russia
2007	World Youth Championships	Ostrava, Czech Republic	8th	10,000m	44:34.66
2008	World Race Walking Cup (U20)	Cheboksary, Russia	3rd	10 km	40:17
2009	European Race Walking Cup (U20)	Metz, France	10th	10 km	43:29
2009	European Race Walking Cup (U20)	Metz, France	1st	Team - 10 km Junior	3 pts
2009	European Junior Championships	Novi Sad, Serbia	2nd	10,000m	40:24.97
2010	World Race Walking Cup (U20)	Chihuahua, Mexico	16th	20 km	1:25:30
2011	European Race Walking Cup	Olhão, Portugal	11th	50 km	4:04:36
2011	European U23 Championships	Ostrava, Czech Republic	2nd	20 km	1:24:25
2013	European Race Walking Cup	Dudince, Slovakia	1st	20 km	1:21:40
2013	European Race Walking Cup	Dudince, Slovakia	1st	Team - 20 km	20 pts
2013	World Championships	Moscow, Russia	5th	20 km	1:22:06
2014	World Race Walking Cup	Taicang, China	30th	20 km	1:21:58
2014	European Championships	Zurich, Switzerland	3rd	20 km	1:19:46
2015	European Race Walking Cup	Murcia, Spain	9th	20 km	1:22:47
2015	European Race Walking Cup	Murcia, Spain	2nd	20 km - Team	35 pts

== See also ==
- List of doping cases in athletics
