= Poland at the 1983 World Championships in Athletics =

- WA code: POL
- National federation: Polski Związek Lekkiej Atletyki
- Website: www.pzla.pl

in Helsinki
- Medals Ranked 7th: Gold 2 Silver 1 Bronze 1 Total 4

World Championships in Athletics appearances
- 1976; 1980; 1983; 1987; 1991; 1993; 1995; 1997; 1999; 2001; 2003; 2005; 2007; 2009; 2011; 2013; 2015; 2017; 2019; 2022; 2023; 2025

Poland competed at the 1983 World Championships in Athletics in Helsinki, Finland, from 7–14 August 1983.

== Medalists ==
Medal	Name	Event	Date	
Gold	Edward Sarul	Shot put men	21.39 m	7 August
Gold	Zdzislaw Hoffmann	Triple jump men	17.42 m	8 August
Silver	Boguslaw Maminski	3000 m steeplechase	8:17.03	12 August
Bronze	Zdzislaw Kwasny	Hammer men	79.42 m	9 August

== Full results ==
=== Men ===
Track and road events

Athlete	Event	Heat		Quarterfinal		Semifinal		Final	
Athlete	Event	Result	Rank	Result	Rank	Result	Rank	Result	Rank
Marian Woronin	100 metres	10.50	3 Q	10.72	7	did not advance			
Ryszard Ostrowski	800 metres	DNS		did not advance					
Piotr Kurek	1500 metres	3:40.96	5 q	—N/a		3:39.54	10	did not advance	
Ryszard Szparak	400 metres hurdles	50.09	2 Q	—N/a		49.17 NR	3 Q	49.78	8
Bogusław Mamiński	3000 metres steeplechase	8:22.79	2 Q	—N/a		8:20.81	1 Q	8:17.03	2nd place, silver medalist(s)
Krzysztof Wesołowski	3000 metres steeplechase	8:27.08	1 Q	—N/a		DNS		did not advance	
Krzysztof Zwoliński; Zenon Licznerski; Czesław Prądzyński; Marian Woronin	4 × 100 metres relay	39.41	4 Q	—N/a		39.01	3 Q	38.72	6
Ryszard Wichrowski; Ryszard Szparak; Andrzej Stępień; Ryszard Podlas	4 × 400 metres relay	3:07.18	3 Q	—N/a		3:05.51	3 Q	DNF	
Ryszard Marczak	Marathon	—N/a						2:13:20	16
Bohdan Bułakowski	50 kilometres walk	—N/a						DNF	
Bogusław Duda	50 kilometres walk	—N/a						DSQ	

Field events

Athlete	Event	Qualification		Final	
Athlete	Event	Distance	Position	Distance	Position
Dariusz Biczysko	High jump	2.15	17	did not advance	
Jacek Wszoła	High jump	2.21	10 Q	2.23	13
Władysław Kozakiewicz	Pole vault	—N/a		5.40	8
Tadeusz Ślusarski	Pole vault	—N/a		5.55	4
Zdzisław Hoffmann	Triple jump	16.72	2 Q	17.42	1st place, gold medalist(s)
Edward Sarul	Shot put	20.82	1 Q	21.39	1st place, gold medalist(s)
Zdzisław Kwaśny	Hammer throw	75.78	2 Q	79.42 NR	3rd place, bronze medalist(s)
Henryk Królak	Hammer throw	NM		did not advance	
Mariusz Tomaszewski	Hammer throw	70.62	18	did not advance	

Combined events – Decathlon

Athlete	Event	100 m	LJ	SP	HJ	400 m	110H	DT	PV	JT	1500 m	Final	Rank
Dariusz Ludwig	Result	11.17	7.29	13.77	2.00	49.84	15.33	43.90	4.70	62.00	4:26.05	7982	10
Dariusz Ludwig	Points	845	833	698	785	883	871	696	760	649	685	7982	10

=== Women ===
Track and road events

Athlete	Event	Heat		Quarterfinal		Semifinal		Final	
Athlete	Event	Result	Rank	Result	Rank	Result	Rank	Result	Rank
Ewa Kasprzyk	200 metres	23.21	2 Q	22.93	2 Q	23.02	4 Q	23.03	8
Jolanta Januchta	800 metres	2:02.58	2 Q	—N/a		2:02.23	5	did not advance	
