= Matteo Giupponi =

Italian racewalker (born 1988)

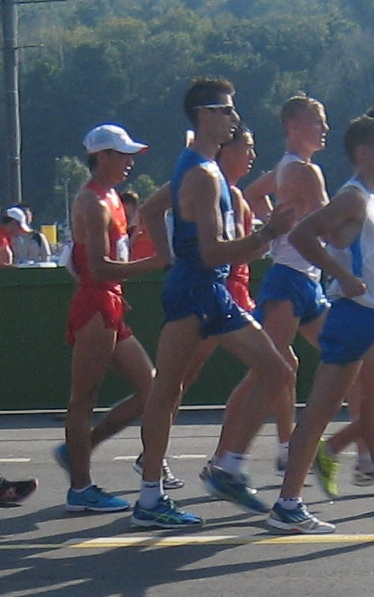
- Giupponi at the 2013 World Athletics Championships.

Personal information
- Nationality: Italian
- Born: 8 October 1988 (age 37) Bergamo, Italy
- Height: 185 cm (6 ft 1 in)
- Weight: 61 kg (134 lb)

Sport
- Country: Italy
- Sport: Athletics
- Event: racewalking
- Club: C.S. Carabinieri
- Coached by: Giovanni Perricelli
Medal record
Men's athletics
Representing Italy
Event	1st	2nd	3rd
European Championships	0	0	1
European U23 Championships	0	0	1
European U20 Championships	0	1	0
World Race Walking Team C'ships	2	0	0
European Race Walking Team C'ships	1	2	0
Total	3	3	2
European Championships
Bronze medal – third place	2022 Munich	35 km walk
World Race Walking Cup
Gold medal – first place	2008 Cheboksary	50 km walk team
Gold medal – first place	2016 Rome	50 km walk team
European Race Walking Team Championships
Gold medal – first place	2009 Metz	20 km walk (team)
Silver medal – second place	2011 Olhão	20 km walk (team)
Silver medal – second place	2021 Poděbrady	20 km walk (team)

Matteo Giupponi (born 8 October 1988) is a male Italian racewalker who was bronze medal at the 2022 European Athletics Championships.

He is engaged to the Italian racewalker Eleonora Giorgi.

== Career ==
He competed at the 2013, 2015, 2017 and 2019 editions of the World Athletics Championships and in 20 km and 50 km at the 2016 Summer Olympics.

== Achievements ==
Year	Competition	Venue	Rank	Event	Time	Notes
2007	European U20 Championships	(Netherlands) Hengelo	2nd	10,000 m track	40:54.88	PB
2009	European U23 Championships	(Lithuania) Kaunas	3rd	20 km	1:23:00	PB
2016	Olympic Games	(Brazil) Rio de Janeiro	8th	20 km	1:20:27	
2022	European Championships	(Germany) Munich	3rd	35 km	2:30:34	PB

== National titles ==
Giupponi won four national championships at individual senior level.

- Italian Athletics Championships
  - 10 km walk: 2013
  - 35 km walk: 2022
  - 50 km walk: 2014
- Italian Athletics Indoor Championships
  - 5000 m walk: 2014

== See also ==
- Italy at the IAAF World Race Walking Cup
- Italy at the European Race Walking Cup
