= Adrian Błocki =

Polish racewalker (born 1990)

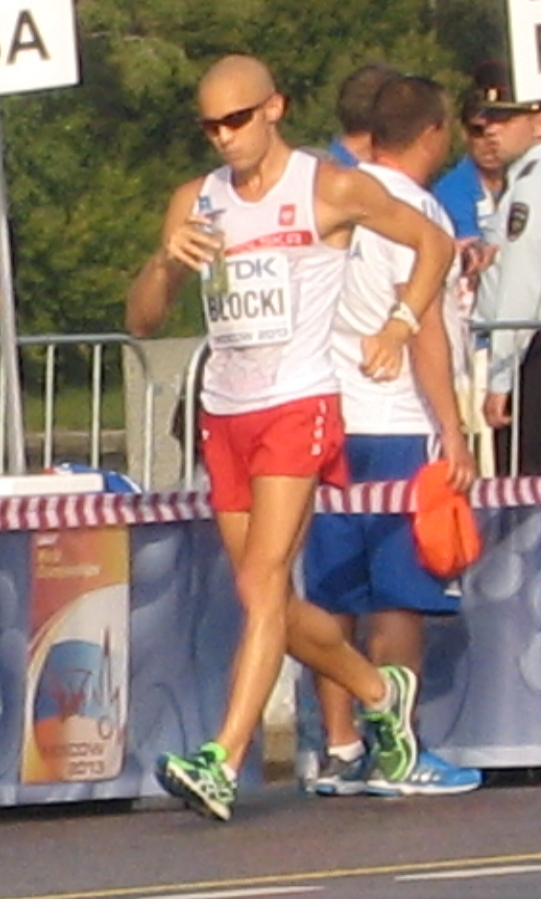
- Błocki at the 2013 IAAF World Championship

Personal information
- Born: 11 April 1990 (age 36) Szczecin, Poland

Sport
- Country: Poland
- Sport: Track and field
- Event: racewalking
- Updated on 29 August 2015

Adrian Błocki (born 11 April 1990) is a male Polish racewalker. He competed for Poland in the 2016 Summer Olympics. He competed in the 50 kilometres walk event at the 2013 World Championships in Athletics. He also competed in the 50 kilometres walk event at the 2015 World Championships in Athletics in Beijing, China.

In 2018, he competed in the men's 50 kilometres walk at the 2018 European Athletics Championships held in Berlin, Germany. He finished in 12th place.

== See also ==
- Poland at the 2015 World Championships in Athletics
