= Dzianis Simanovich =

Belarusian racewalker (born 1987)

Dzianis Simanovich (Belarusian: Дзяніс Сімановіч; born 20 April 1987 in Chișinău, Moldova) is a racewalker for Belarus. He competed in the 20 km walk at the 2008 and 2012 Summer Olympics, where he placed 28th and 12th respectively.
