= Artur Brzozowski =

Polish race walker (born 1985)

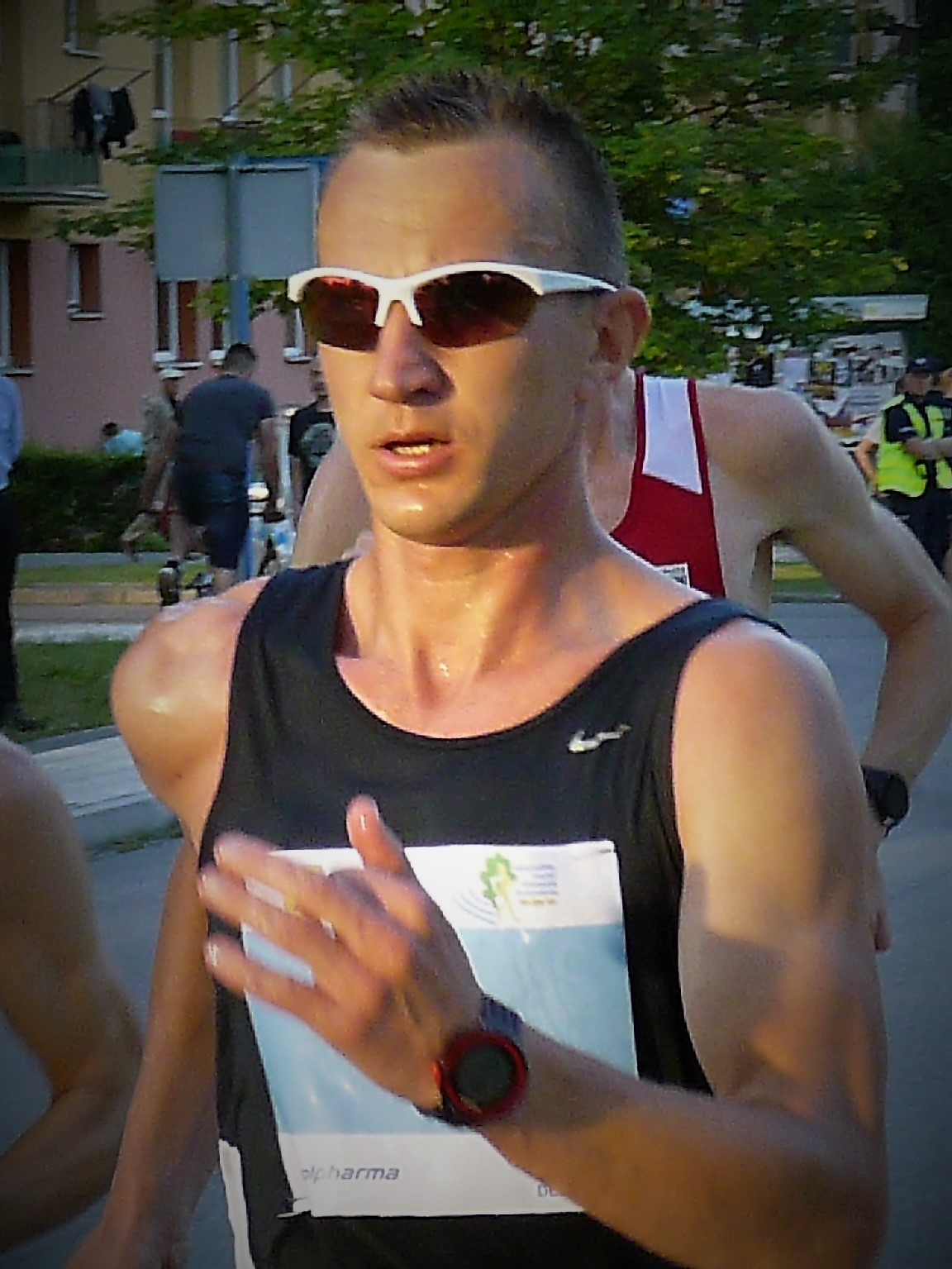
- Brzozowski in 2017

Personal information
- Nationality: Poland
- Born: 29 March 1985 (age 41) Nisko, Podkarpackie, Poland
- Height: 1.72 m (5 ft 8 in)
- Weight: 65 kg (143 lb)

Sport
- Sport: Athletics
- Event: Race walking
- Club: Znicz Biłgoraj
- Coached by: Stanislaw Bak

Achievements and titles
- Personal bests: 20 km walk: 1:22:23; 50 km walk: 3:50:07

Artur Brzozowski (born 29 March 1985) is a Polish race walker. He set a personal best time of 3:50:07 by finishing second for the 50 km race walk at the 2010 European Athletics Walking Meeting in Dudince, Slovakia.

Brzozowski represented Poland at the 2008 Summer Olympics in Beijing, where he competed for the men's 50 km race walk, along with his teammates Grzegorz Sudoł and Rafał Fedaczyński. Unfortunately, Brzozowski received a final warning (a total of three red cards) for not following the proper form during the 20 km lap, and was subsequently disqualified from the competition.

In 2021, Brzozowski participated in the men's 50 kilometres walk at the 2020 Summer Olympics in Tokyo, placing 12th and setting a new season best. He also competed for Poland at the 2024 Summer Olympics.
