= Dawid Tomala =

Polish race walker

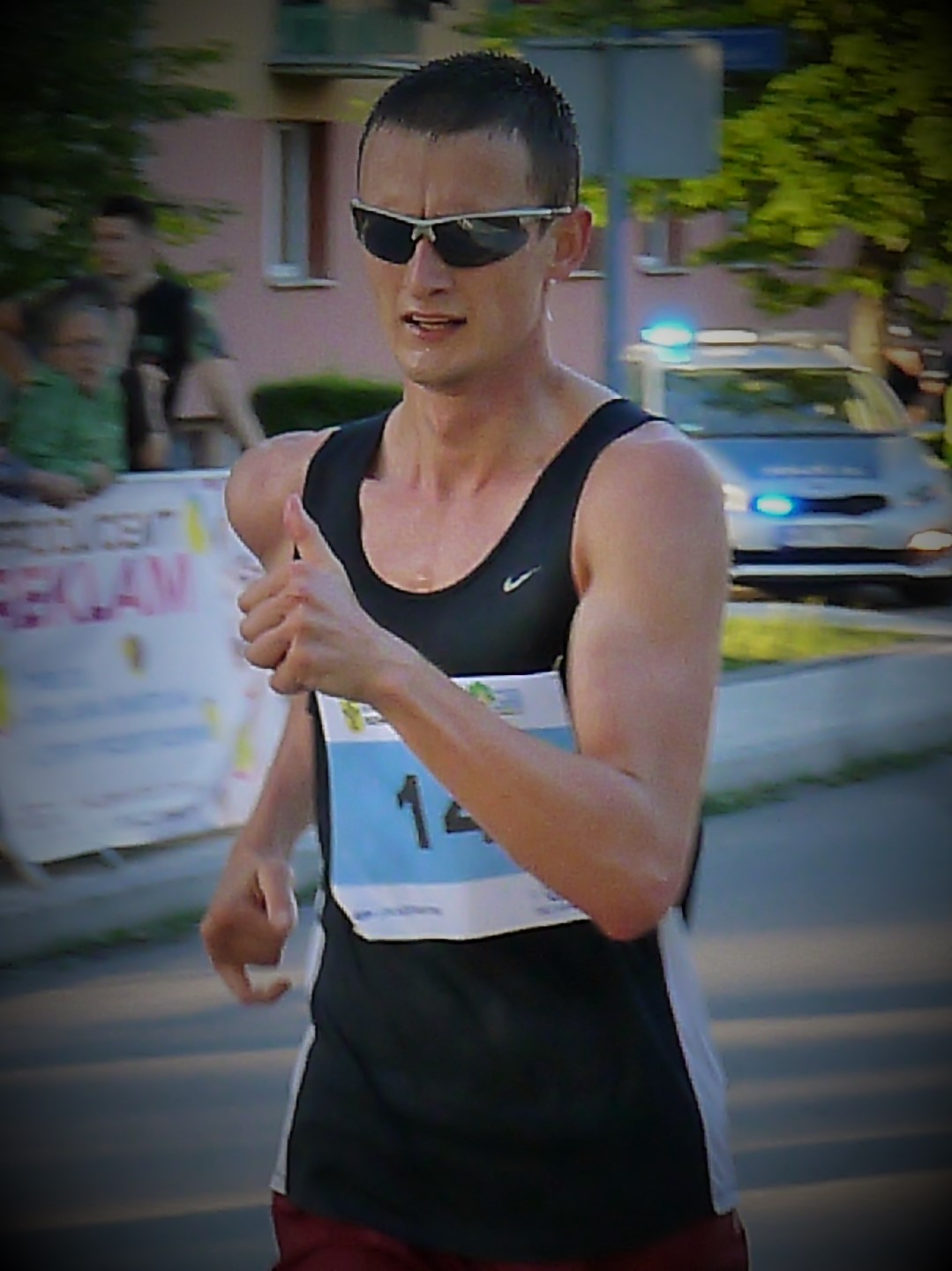
- Tomala in 2017

Personal information
- Born: 27 August 1989 (age 36) Tychy, Poland
- Height: 1.82 m (6 ft 0 in)
- Weight: 66 kg (146 lb)

Sport
- Country: Poland
- Sport: Athletics
- Event: Race walking
- Club: AZS KU Politechnika Opolska
Medal record
Men's Racewalking
Representing Poland
Olympic Games
Gold medal – first place	2020 Tokyo	50 km walk
European U23 Championships
Gold medal – first place	2011 Ostrava	20 km walk
European Race Walking Cup
Gold medal – first place	2009 Metz	Team – 20 km

Dawid Tomala (born 27 August 1989 in Tychy) is a Polish race walker. He is the reigning Olympic champion in the 50 kilometres walk, having won the gold medal at the 2020 Tokyo Olympics. Tomala also represented his country at the 2012 London Olympics, finishing 19th in the 20 km walk.

== Career and personal life ==
He began race walking in 2003 at the UKS Maraton Korzeniowski club in Bieruń, Poland. He is coached by his father, Grzegorz Tomala. Dawid won multiple Polish national titles in racewalking.

== Competition record ==
Representing Poland
Year	Competition	Venue	Position	Event	Notes
2008	World Junior Championships	Bydgoszcz, Poland	8th	10,000 m walk	42:33.60
2009	European Race Walking Cup	Metz, France	16th	20 km walk	1:30:56
2009	European Race Walking Cup	Metz, France	3rd	Team – 20 km	40 pts
2009	European U23 Championships	Kaunas, Lithuania	7th	20 km walk	1:25:26
2010	World Race Walking Cup	Chihuahua, Mexico	36th	20 km walk	1:29:21
2010	European Championships	Barcelona, Spain	19th	20 km walk	1:25:50
2011	European U23 Championships	Ostrava, Czech Republic	1st	20 km walk	1:24:21
2012	World Race Walking Cup	Saransk, Russia	—	20 km walk	DNF
2012	Olympic Games	London, United Kingdom	19th	20 km walk	1:21:55
2013	European Race Walking Cup	Dudince, Slovakia	—	20 km walk	DNF
2013	World Championships	Moscow, Russia	—	20 km walk	DNF
2016	World Race Walking Team Championships	Rome, Italy	35th	20 km walk	1:23:07
2018	World Race Walking Team Championships	Taicang, China	48th	20 km walk	1:29:04
2018	European Championships	Berlin, Germany	19th	20 km walk	1:25:06
2019	European Race Walking Cup	Alytus, Lithuania	33rd	20 km walk	1:27:31
2019	World Championships	Doha, Qatar	32nd	20 km walk	1:38:15
2021	Olympic Games	Sapporo, Japan	1st	50 km walk	3:50:08
2022	World Championships	Eugene, OR, United States	19th	35 km walk	2:30:47 PB

== Personal bests ==
- 3000 metres race walk – 10:56.98 (Šamorín 2018)
  - 3000 metres race walk indoor – 10:58.89 (Glasgow 2018) NBP
- 5000 metres race walk – 19:16.93 (Gdańsk 2013)
  - 5000 metres race walk indoor – 19:13.16 (Spała 2013)
- 10,000 metres race walk – 40:17.62 (Lublin 2018)
- 10 kilometres race walk – 40:11 (Katowice 2013)
- 20 kilometres race walk – 1:20:30 (Olomouc 2013)
