= Rafał Fedaczyński =

Polish racewalker (born 1980)

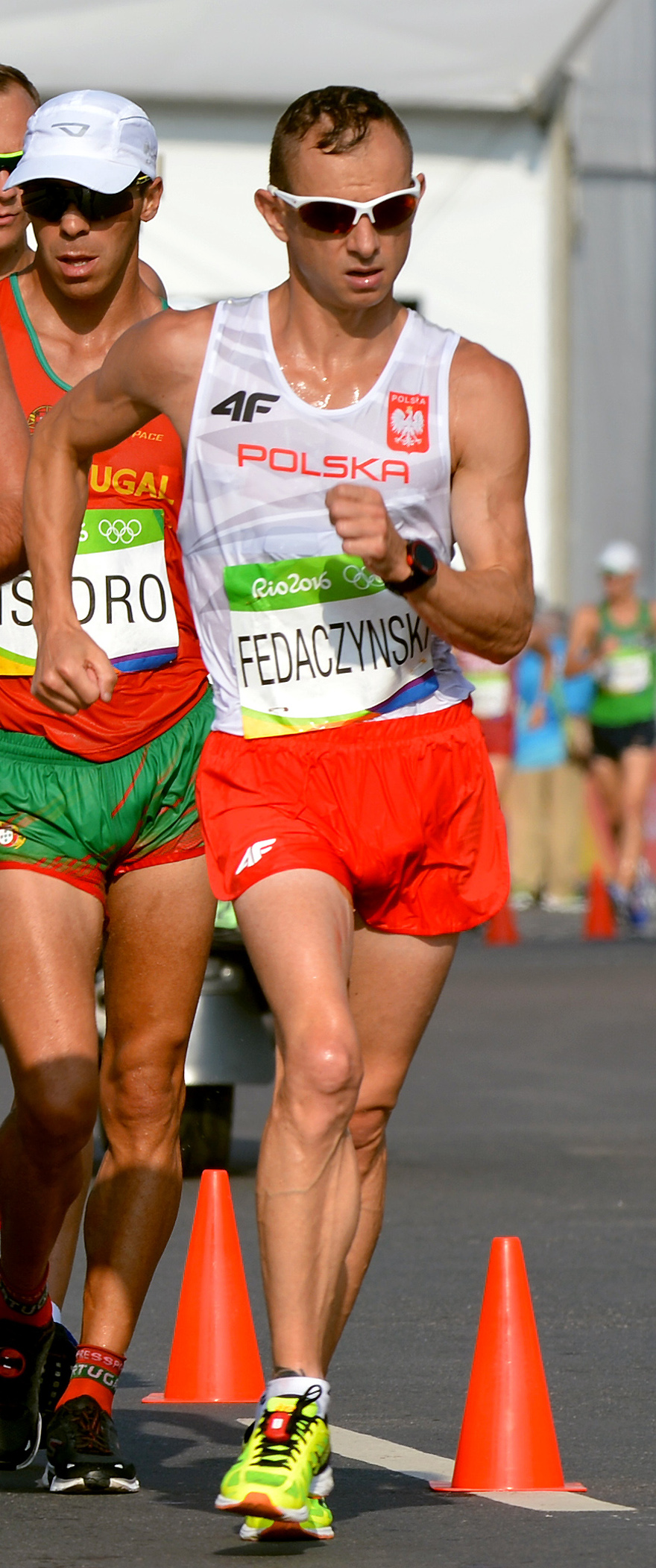
- Fedaczyński at the 2016 Olympics

Personal information
- Nationality: Poland
- Born: 3 December 1980 (age 45) Hrubieszów, Poland
- Height: 1.68 m (5 ft 6 in)
- Weight: 58 kg (128 lb)

Sport
- Sport: Athletics
- Event: Race walking
- Club: AZS AWF Katowice

Achievements and titles
- Personal bests: 3 km – 11:28.76 (2011); 5 km – 19:19.02 (2011); 10 km – 39:33 (2010); 20 km – 1:20:18 (2014); 50 km – 3:46:05 (2011)

Rafał Fedaczyński (born 3 December 1980) is a Polish race walker. He competed in the 50 km event at the World Race Walking Cup in 2004 and 2006, at the World Championships in 2005 and 2007, and at the 2008, 2012 and 2016 Olympics. His best result was eighth place at the 2008 Olympics.

He set a personal best of 3:46:05 hours for the 50 km walk at the 2011 Dudinska Patdesiatka, where he was the runner-up behind Matej Tóth.

== Competitions record ==
Year	Competition	Venue	Position	Event	Notes
Representing Poland
2003	European Race Walking Cup	Cheboksary, Russia	27th	50 km walk	4:19:25
2004	World Race Walking Cup	Naumburg, Germany	23rd	50 km walk	4:05:10
2005	European Race Walking Cup	Miskolc, Hungary	14th	50 km walk	3:56:13
2005	World Championships	Helsinki, Finland	—	50 km walk	DNF
2006	World Race Walking Cup	A Coruña, Spain	19th	50 km walk	3:57:24
2007	European Race Walking Cup	Royal Leamington Spa, United Kingdom	9th	50 km walk	3:48:07
2007	World Championships	Osaka, Japan	30th	50 km walk	4:24:51
2008	World Race Walking Cup	Cheboksary, Russia	46th	20 km walk	1:25:13
2008	Olympic Games	Beijing, China	8th	50 km walk	3:46:51
2009	World Championships	Berlin, Germany	—	50 km walk	DNF
2010	World Race Walking Cup	Chihuahua, Mexico	22nd	20 km walk	1:26:58
2011	World Championships	Daegu, South Korea	—	50 km walk	DQ
2012	World Race Walking Cup	Saransk, Russia	15th	20 km walk	1:22:05
2012	Olympic Games	London, United Kingdom	—	50 km walk	DNF
2014	World Race Walking Cup	Taicang, China	53rd	20 km walk	1:23:41
2014	European Championships	Zürich, Switzerland	16th	20 km walk	1:24:28
