= 2018 IAAF World Race Walking Team Championships =

- Organisers: IAAF
- Edition: 28th
- Date: 5–6 May
- Host city: Taicang, China
- Events: 5

The 2018 IAAF World Race Walking Team Championships was the 28th edition of the global team racewalking competition organised by the Association of Athletics Federations.

== Overview ==
The programme remained unchanged, with senior men's races over 20 km and 50 km, a 20 km senior women's race, and junior category events for both sexes over 10 km. However, following the approval by the IAAF of the women's 50 km walk as an official event, for the first time women were permitted to enter the 50 km. A separate women's 50 km was not scheduled, but women were allowed to enter the men's event and were treated as equal competitors for team scoring.

== Medal Summary ==
Race	Gold		Silver		Bronze	
10 km (junior)	(China) Zhang Yao	40:07 PB	(China) Wang Zhaozhao	40:12 PB	(Guatemala) José Eduardo Ortiz	40:17 NJR
10 km (team)	China; Zhang Yao; Wang Zhaozhao	3 pts	Japan; Shō Sakazaki; Hiroto Jūsho	14 pts	Australia; Kyle Swan; Declan Tingay	24 pts
20 km	(Japan) Kōki Ikeda	1:21:13	(China) Wang Kaihua	1:21:22	(Italy) Massimo Stano	1:21:33
20 km (team)	Japan; Kōki Ikeda; Toshikazu Yamanishi; Isamu Fujisawa	12 pts	Italy; Massimo Stano; Francesco Fortunato; Giorgio Rubino	29 pts	China; Wang Kaihua; Jin Xiangqian; Niu Wenchao	42 pts
50 km	(Japan) Hirooki Arai	3:44:25	(Japan) Hayato Katsuki	3:44:31 PB	(Japan) Satoshi Mauro	3:44:52
50 km (team)	Japan; Hirooki Arai; Hayato Katsuki; Satoshi Mauro	10 pts	Ukraine; Maryan Zakalnytskyy; Ivan Banzeruk; Valeriy Litanyuk	29 pts	Poland; Rafał Augustyn; Rafał Sikora; Adrian Błocki	37 pts

=== Women ===
Race	Gold		Silver		Bronze	
10 km (junior)	(Mexico) Alegna González	45:08 AJR	(Ecuador) Glenda Morejón	45:13	(Japan) Nanako Fujii	45:29 PB
10 km (team)	China; Li Wenxiu; Ma Li	10 pts	Ecuador; Glenda Morejón; Paula Milena Torres	13 pts	Turkey; Meryem Bekmez; Ayşe Tekdal	25 pts
20 km	(Mexico) Lupita González	1:26:38	(China) Qieyang Shenjie	1:27:06	(China) Yang Jiayu	1:27:22
20 km (team)	China; Qieyang Shenjie; Yang Jiayu; Wang Na	17 pts	Italy; Eleonora Giorgi; Valentina Trapletti; Antonella Palmisano; Nicole Colombi	38 pts	Spain; Maria Pérez; Laura García-Caro; Raquel González	40 pts
50 km	(China) Liang Rui	4:04:36 WR	(China) Yin Hang	4:09:09	(Australia) Claire Tallent	4:09:33 AR
50 km (team)	China; Liang Rui; Yin Hang; Ma Faying	8 pts	Ecuador; Paola Pérez; Johana Ordóñez; Magaly Bonilla	21 pts	Ukraine; Khrystina Yudkina; Vasylyna Vitovshchik; Alina Tsviliy	40 pts

== Results ==
=== Men's 20 km ===
Rank	Name	Nationality	Time	Notes	Penalties	
1st place, gold medalist(s)	Koki Ikeda	Japan	1:21:13			
2nd place, silver medalist(s)	Kaihua Wang	China	1:21:22			
3rd place, bronze medalist(s)	Massimo Stano	Italy	1:21:33			
4	Toshikazu Yamanishi	Japan	1:21:53		~ ~	
5	Brian Pintado	Ecuador	1:22:21	SB	~	
6	Jin Xiangqian	China	1:22:35		~ ~	
7	Isamu Fujisawa	Japan	1:22:54			
8	Álvaro Martín	Spain	1:23:22		~	
9	Francesco Fortunato	Italy	1:23:31			
10	Manuel Esteban Soto	Colombia	1:23:34			
11	Hagen Pohle	Germany	1:23:44			
12	Éider Arévalo	Colombia	1:23:46			
13	Mauricio Arteaga	Ecuador	1:23:49			
14	Tom Bosworth	United Kingdom	1:23:54		~ ~ ~	
15	Lebogang Shange	South Africa	1:23:56			
16	Vasiliy Mizinov	Authorised Neutral Athletes	1:23:56		~	
17	Giorgio Rubino	Italy	1:24:03	SB		
18	Eiki Takahashi	Japan	1:24:07		~ ~ ~	
19	Miguel Ángel López	Spain	1:24:08			
20	Ivan Losev	Ukraine	1:24:14			
21	Marius Žiūkas	Lithuania	1:24:17			
22	Alberto Amezcua	Spain	1:24:24			
23	Diego García Carrera	Spain	1:24:37			
24	Manuel Bermúdez	Spain	1:24:54			
25	Christopher Linke	Germany	1:24:59			
26	César Rodríguez	Peru	1:25:02	SB	~ ~	
27	José Leyver Ojeda	Mexico	1:25:11		~	
28	Moacir Zimmermann	Brazil	1:25:14	SB	>	
29	Andrés Chocho	Ecuador	1:25:29			~ >
30	Kévin Campion	France	1:25:30	SB	~ > ~	
31	Daisuke Matsunaga	Japan	1:26:25		~ ~	
32	Hassanine Sebei	Tunisia	1:26:41	SB		
33	Horacio Nava	Mexico	1:26:51		>	
34	Wenchao Niu	China	1:26:56			
35	João Vieira	Portugal	1:26:59			
36	Mohamed Ragab	Egypt	1:26:59	SB	~ ~	
37	Gabriel Bordier	France	1:27:11			
38	Cian McManamon	Ireland	1:27:17			
39	Wayne Snyman	South Africa	1:27:27			
40	Veli-Matti Partanen	Finland	1:27:35	SB		
41	Miguel Rodrigues	Portugal	1:27:47			
42	Emmanuel Corvera	United States	1:28:05	SB	~	
43	Artur Brzozowski	Poland	1:28:11		> > ~	
44	Viktor Shumik	Ukraine	1:28:24			
45	Miroslav Úradník	Slovakia	1:28:32			
46	José Israel Meléndez	Puerto Rico	1:28:43		~	
47	Rhydian Cowley	Australia	1:28:54			
48	Dawid Tomala	Poland	1:29:04		>	
49	Irfan Kolothum Thodi	India	1:29:12		~	
50	Ricardo Ortiz	Mexico	1:29:15			
51	Sahin Senoduncu	Turkey	1:29:16	SB		
52	Jarkko Kinnunen	Finland	1:29:23	SB		
53	Nils Brembach	Germany	1:29:27			
54	Yingchao Gao	China	1:29:33			
55	José Carlos Mamani	Peru	1:29:47	PB	~	
56	Benjamin Thorne	Canada	1:30:19			
57	Aurelien Quinion	France	1:30:31			
58	Byeongkwang Choe	South Korea	1:30:32		~ ~	
59	Isaac Palma	Mexico	1:30:35		~	
60	Paolo Yurivilca	Peru	1:30:57	SB		
61	Serhiy Budza	Ukraine	1:30:58			
62	Adam Garganis	Australia	1:31:20		~	
63	Brendon Reading	Australia	1:31:25			
64	Vikash Singh	India	1:31:50		> ~ >	
65	Georgiy Sheiko	Kazakhstan	1:32:02			
66	John Cody Risch	United States	1:32:06			
67	Alger Liang	Canada	1:32:15			
68	Rick Liesting	Netherlands	1:32:31		~ ~	
69	Miguel Carvalho	Portugal	1:32:41			
70	José Luis Doctor	Mexico	1:32:52		~	
71	Sharma Neeraj	India	1:32:56	SB	~	
72	Jhonatan Amores	Ecuador	1:33:06			
73	Sizwe Ndebele	South Africa	1:33:29		>	
74	Lenyn Mamani	Peru	1:33:31	SB	~	
75	Tadas Šuškevičius	Lithuania	1:33:55			
76	Bence Venyercsán	Hungary	1:34:21			
77	Tebatso Mashimbyi	South Africa	1:35:08		> >	
78	Eduard Zabuzhenko	Ukraine	1:37:54			
79	Po-Ying Lo	Chinese Taipei	1:40:08	SB		
80	Man Kit Chin	Hong Kong	1:43:32		> >	
	Mert Atli	Turkey	DNF			
	José Alessandro Bagio	Brazil	DNF			
	Érick Bernabé Barrondo	Guatemala	DNF			
	Fabien Bernabé	France	DNF			
	Dane Bird-Smith	Australia	DNF			
	Zelin Cai	China	DNF		>	
	Marco De Luca	Italy	DNF			
	Serkan Dogan	Turkey	DNF			
	Aliaksandr Liakhovich	Belarus	DNF		~ ~	
	José Leonardo Montaña	Colombia	DNF			
	Josè Romero	Honduras	DNF			
	Vitaliy Terekhin	Kazakhstan	DNF		~ >	
	Alex Wright	Ireland	DNF		~ 230.7(c)	
	Marek Adamowicz	Canada	DQ		> > > > 230.7(c)	
	José Alejandro Barrondo	Guatemala	DQ		~ ~ ~ ~ 230.7(c)	
	Michael Hosking	Australia	DQ		~ ~ ~ ~ 230.7(c)	
	Edmund Sim	Singapore	DQ		> > > >	
	Federico Tontodonati	Italy	DNS			
	Callum Wilkinson	United Kingdom	DNS			

=== Team (Men 20 km) ===
Rank	Team	Points
1	Japan	12
2	Italy	29
3	China	42
4	Ecuador	47
5	Spain	49
6	Germany	89
7	Mexico	110
8	France	124
9	Ukraine	125
10	South Africa	127
11	Peru	141
12	Portugal	145
13	Australia	172
14	India	184

=== Women's 20 km ===
Rank	Name	Nationality	Time	Notes	Penalties
1st place, gold medalist(s)	Maria Guadalupe González	Mexico	1:26:38	SB	
2nd place, silver medalist(s)	Qieyang Shijie	China	1:27:06	SB	~
3rd place, bronze medalist(s)	Yang Jiayu	China	1:27:22	SB	~
4	Érica de Sena	Brazil	1:28:11	SB	
5	Eleonora Giorgi	Italy	1:28:31	SB	
6	Anežka Drahotová	Czech Republic	1:28:40	SB	~
7	María Pérez	Spain	1:28:50	PB	~
8	Kimberly García	Peru	1:28:56	NR	
9	Inna Kashyna	Ukraine	1:28:58	PB	~ ~
10	Brigita Virbalyte-Dimsiene	Lithuania	1:29:02	PB	
11	Nadiya Borovska	Ukraine	1:29:28		~ ~
12	Na Wang	China	1:29:35		~
13	Yingliu Wang	China	1:29:36		
14	Laura García-Caro	Spain	1:29:58	SB	~ ~
15	Sandra Arenas	Colombia	1:30:11		
16	Valentina Trapletti	Italy	1:30:19	PB	
17	Antonella Palmisano	Italy	1:30:29		
18	Ana Cabecinha	Portugal	1:30:39		
19	Raquel González	Spain	1:31:01	SB	
20	Mária Czaková	Slovakia	1:31:03	PB	
21	Viktoryia Rashchupkina	Belarus	1:31:22	PB	
22	Kumiko Okada	Japan	1:31:29	SB	~
23	Alana Barber	New Zealand	1:31:32	NR	~
24	Chahinez Nasri	Tunisia	1:32:20	NR	~
25	Živile Vaiciukeviciute	Lithuania	1:32:30		~
26	Yana Smerdova	Authorised Neutral Athletes	1:32:42		
27	Lidia Sánchez-Puebla	Spain	1:32:49	SB	
28	Emilie Menuet	France	1:33:02	SB	
29	Maria Michta-Coffey	United States	1:33:05		
30	Maritza Guamán	Ecuador	1:33:06	PB	
31	Sandra Galvis	Colombia	1:33:11	SB	~
32	Saskia Feige	Germany	1:33:12	PB	
33	Eleonora Dominici	Italy	1:33:40		
34	Ai Michiguchi	Japan	1:33:42	SB	
35	Emilia Lehmeyer	Germany	1:33:43		
36	Arabelly Orjuela	Colombia	1:33:45	SB	~
37	Soumya Baby	India	1:33:54		~
38	Andreea Arsine	Romania	1:33:59	SB	
39	Mirna Ortiz	Guatemala	1:34:13	SB	~ ~
40	Yang Liujing	China	1:34:15		
41	Katarzyna Zdziebło	Poland	1:34:18		~
42	Nicole Colombi	Italy	1:34:33	SB	>
43	Jeon Yeong-eun	South Korea	1:34:44	SB	
44	Khushbir Kaur	India	1:34:59		
45	Edna Barros	Portugal	1:35:03	PB	
46	Yehualeye Beletew	Ethiopia	1:35:04	SB	
47	Siu Nga Ching	Hong Kong	1:35:06	SB	
48	Ana Rodean	Romania	1:35:17	SB	
49	Valentyna Myronchuk	Ukraine	1:35:32		
50	Monika Vaiciukevičiūtė	Lithuania	1:35:35	SB	
51	Yeseida Carrillo	Colombia	1:35:37		
52	Violaine Averous	France	1:35:39		~
53	Gemma Bridge	United Kingdom	1:35:43	SB	
54	Marine Quennehen	France	1:35:44	SB	>
55	Ravina	India	1:35:47		~
56	Miranda Melville	United States	1:35:49		>
57	Diana Aydosova	Kazakhstan	1:35:52	SB	
58	Amanda Cano	Spain	1:36:29		
59	Rachel Tallent	Australia	1:36:34		
60	Clémence Béretta	France	1:36:35		
61	Valeria Ortuño	Mexico	1:36:38		
62	Amandine Marcou	France	1:36:45	PB	
63	Kaori Kawazoe	Japan	1:37:13		
64	Bethan Davies	United Kingdom	1:37:31		~ ~ ~
65	Robyn Stevens	United States	1:38:06		
66	Tamara Havrylyuk	Ukraine	1:38:19	SB	
67	Teresa Zurek	Germany	1:38:23		
68	Anél Oosthuizen	South Africa	1:39:09	SB	~
69	Galina Yakusheva-Kichigina	Kazakhstan	1:39:22	SB	
70	Jessica Hancco	Peru	1:39:50	SB	
71	Yuki Yoshizumi	Japan	1:42:12		
72	Mara Ribeiro	Portugal	1:42:18		
73	Leyde Guerra	Peru	1:42:20		
74	Shanti Kumari	India	1:42:38		
75	Regina Rykova	Kazakhstan	1:42:51	SB	
76	Mihaela Acatrinei	Romania	1:44:21	SB	
77	Daria Khusainova	Ukraine	1:46:14		>
78	Evelyn Inga	Peru	1:47:16		>
79	Amberly Melendez	United States	1:50:29		
	Lee Da-seul	South Korea	DNF		> >
	Wen-Tzu Lin	Chinese Taipei	DNF		
	Semiha Mutlu-Özdemir	Turkey	DNF		
	Kristina Saltanovic	Lithuania	DNF		
	Jemima Montag	Australia	DQ		~ ~ ~ ~ 230.7(c)

=== Team (Women 20 km) ===
Rank	Team	Points
1	China	17
2	Italy	38
3	Spain	40
4	Ukraine	69
5	Colombia	82
6	Lithuania	85
7	Japan	119
8	France	134
9	Germany	134
10	Portugal	135
11	India	136
12	United States	150
13	Peru	151
14	Romania	162
15	Kazakhstan	201

=== Men's 50 km ===
Rank	Name	Nationality	Time	Notes	Penalties
1st place, gold medalist(s)	Hirooki Arai	Japan	3:44:25	SB	
2nd place, silver medalist(s)	Hayato Katsuki	Japan	3:44:31	PB	
3rd place, bronze medalist(s)	Satoshi Maruo	Japan	3:44:52	SB	
4	Marian Zakalnytstyi	Ukraine	3:44:59	PB	
5	Qin Wang	China	3:45:29	PB	
6	Rui Wang	China	3:48:01	PB	>
7	Rafał Augustyn	Poland	3:48:22	SB	>>
8	Perseus Karlström	Sweden	3:48:54	SB	
9	Quentin Rew	New Zealand	3:48:58	SB	~~
10	Ivan Banzeruk	Ukraine	3:49:17	SB	
11	Rafal Sikora	Poland	3:49:54	SB	
12	Evan Dunfee	Canada	3:50:18	SB	
13	Dzmitry Dziubin	Belarus	3:52:25	PB	
14	Michele Antonelli	Italy	3:53:00	SB	
15	Valeriy Litanyuk	Ukraine	3:53:05	PB	~
16	Bernardo Uriel Barrondo	Guatemala	3:53:10	PB	
17	Brendan Boyce	Ireland	3:53:32	SB	>
18	Jesús Ángel García	Spain	3:53:48	SB	> ~
19	Adrian Błocki	Poland	3:54:31	SB	~
20	Nathaniel Seiler	Germany	3:54:54	PB	
21	Claudio Villanueva	Ecuador	3:55:04	SB	
22	Andrea Agrusti	Italy	3:55:09	PB	
23	Carl Dohmann	Germany	3:55:58	SB	
24	Marc Tur	Spain	3:56:28		>
25	Benjamín Sánchez	Spain	3:56:37	SB	
26	Jijiang Han	China	3:57:33	PB	>
27	Sandeep Kumar	India	3:59:28		>>
28	Andriy Hrechkovskyi	Ukraine	3:59:32	SB	~~
29	Jitendra Singh	India	4:00:13		
30	José Ignacio Díaz	Spain	4:01:06	SB	
31	Karl Junghannß	Germany	4:02:36	SB	> PL300 ~ >
32	Hyunmyeong Joo	South Korea	4:02:38	PB	~
33	Artur Mastianica	Lithuania	4:02:41		
34	Mathieu Bilodeau	Canada	4:05:02	SB	>
35	Hugo Andrieu	France	4:05:15	PB	
36	Yuki Ito	Japan	4:06:20	SB	~ ~ ~ PL300
37	Anatole Ibáñez	Sweden	4:06:27	SB	>
38	Ihor Saharuk	Ukraine	4:06:50	SB	
39	Wei-Lin Chang	Chinese Taipei	4:10:13	PB	
40	Stefano Chiesa	Italy	4:11:07	PB	>
41	Anders Hansson	Sweden	4:12:47	SB	>
42	Pablo Oliva	Spain	4:14:13	SB	
43	Rongjiang Shan	China	4:15:28	SB	
44	Anthony Gruttadauro	United States	4:16:23	PB	
45	Darwin Leon	Ecuador	4:17:53		>
46	Matthew Forgues	United States	4:18:17		
47	Youngjun Byun	South Korea	4:25:30	SB	~~
48	Lukáš Gdula	Czech Republic	4:25:47		>>
49	Qingsheng Ceng	China	4:44:58	SB	~
	Nicholas Christie	United States	DNF		
	Marius Cocioran	Romania	DNF		
	Matteo Giupponi	Italy	DNF		
	Pedro Isidro	Portugal	DNF		
	Kai Kobayashi	Japan	DNF		~ ~ ~ 230.7(c)
	Hendro Hendro	Indonesia	DQ		>>> ~ 230.7(c)
	Aleksi Ojala	Finland	DQ		~ ~ ~ > 230.7(c)
	Chilsung Park	South Korea	DQ		~ ~ ~ ~ 230.7(c)
	Rob Tersteeg	Netherlands	DQ		>>>> 230.7(c)
	David Velasquez	Ecuador	DQ		~ ~ ~ ~

=== Team (Men 50 km) ===
Rank	Team	Points
1	Japan	6
2	Ukraine	29
3	Poland	37
4	China	37
5	Spain	67
6	Germany	74
7	Italy	76
8	Sweden	86

=== Women's 50 km ===
Rank	Name	Nationality	Time	Notes	Penalties
1st place, gold medalist(s)	Liang Rui	China	4:04:36	WR	
2nd place, silver medalist(s)	Hang Yin	China	4:09:09	PB	
3rd place, bronze medalist(s)	Claire Tallent	Australia	4:09:33	AR	~
4	Paola Pérez	Ecuador	4:12:56	AR	
5	Faying Ma	China	4:13:28	PB	
6	Johana Ordóñez	Ecuador	4:14:28	PB	
7	Maocuo Li	China	4:14:47	PB	
8	Julia Takacs	Spain	4:16:37		
9	Nastassia Yatsevich	Belarus	4:18:00	SB	
10	Nadzeya Darazhuk	Belarus	4:18:31	PB	>>
11	Magaly Bonilla	Ecuador	4:19:04	PB	~
12	Khrystyna Yudkina	Ukraine	4:22:15	NR	
13	Vasylyna Vitovshchyk	Ukraine	4:24:08	PB	>
14	Mayra Herrera	Guatemala	4:28:30	SB	
15	Alina Tsvilii	Ukraine	4:28:49	PB	
16	Ainhoa Pinedo	Spain	4:30:02		
17	Mar Juárez	Spain	4:30:30	PB	
18	Tiia Kuikka	Finland	4:32:43	PB	>
19	María Larios	Spain	4:37:43	PB	
20	Lyudmyla Shelest	Ukraine	4:37:43	SB	>
21	Kseniya Radko	Ukraine	4:38:23	SB	
22	Mariavittoria Becchetti	Italy	4:40:15	PB	
23	Natalie Le Roux	South Africa	4:48:00	AR	
24	Lucie Barritaul	France	4:48:08	PB	>>
25	Maéva Casale	France	4:51:13	PB	>
26	Joci Caballero	Peru	4:52:01		
27	Nair De Rosa	Brazil	4:52:43		
28	Erin Taylor-Talcott	United States	5:08:56		>>
29	Susan Randall	United States	5:12:07	SB	
	Kathleen Burnett	United States	DNF		~ >
	Inês Henriques	Portugal	DNF		
	Kang Zhou	China	DQ		~ >>>

=== Team (Women 50 km) ===
Rank	Team	Points
1	China	8
2	Ecuador	21
3	Ukraine	40
4	Spain	41

=== Junior Men 10 km ===
Rank	Name	Nationality	Time	Notes	Penalties
1st place, gold medalist(s)	Zhang Yao	China	40:07	WU20L	~ ~
2nd place, silver medalist(s)	Wang Zhaozhao	China	40:12	PB	~
3rd place, bronze medalist(s)	José Eduardo Ortiz	Guatemala	40:17	NU20R	~ ~
4	Shuai Sun	China	40:24	PB	~ ~
5	Sho Sakazaki	Japan	40:55		~ ~
6	Yohanis Algaw	Ethiopia	40:56	AU20R	~
7	David Kuster	France	41:02	NU20R	~
8	Mikita Kaliada	Belarus	41:18		
9	Hiroto Jusho	Japan	41:35		~
10	Kyle Swan	Australia	41:44	PB	~
11	José Manuel Pérez	Spain	41:51	PB	
12	Łukasz Niedziałek	Poland	41:53	SB	
13	Mingyu Kim	South Korea	41:57	SB	~
14	Declan Tingay	Australia	42:01	PB	~ ~ ~
15	Nicolas Fanelli	Italy	42:10	PB	
16	Saúl Mena	Mexico	42:15	PB	
17	Matheus Corrêa	Brazil	42:26	NU20R	
18	Pedro Conesa	Spain	42:35	PB	
19	Anderson Callejas	Colombia	42:40	PB	~
20	Antonio Loja	Ecuador	42:42	PB	
21	Sebastián Merchán	Colombia	42:47	SB	
22	Pavel Olkhovik	Belarus	42:48	PB	
23	César Córdoba	Mexico	42:50		
24	Riccardo Orsoni	Italy	42:58	PB	
25	Abdulrahman Mahmoud	Egypt	42:59	NU20R	~ ~
26	Álvaro López Núñez	Spain	43:04	PB	
27	Andriy Syndyuk	Ukraine	43:08	PB	~
28	Takumi Suzuki	Japan	43:26		
29	Abdulselam İmük	Turkey	43:30		
30	Davide Finocchietti	Italy	43:39	PB	
31	Illya Bilyk	Ukraine	44:05	PB	
32	Juan Manuel Calderon	Costa Rica	44:06	NU20R	
33	Oscar Oswaldo Patín Manobanda	Ecuador	44:20	PB	
34	Michy Osccohuaman	Peru	44:23	PB	~
35	Matteo Duc	France	44:25	PB	
36	Francois Jacobs	South Africa	44:37	NU20R	~ >
37	Paulo Martins	Portugal	44:59		~
38	Viktor Kononenko	Ukraine	45:24		
39	Noe Quispe	Peru	45:38	PB	~
40	Azad Ertas	Turkey	46:02		
41	Mitchell Baker	Australia	46:47		
42	Antonio Farmer	South Africa	46:49	PB	
43	Jacques Heymans	South Africa	49:53		~
44	Giovanni Cisneros	United States	52:41		
45	Akhmedi Kakhramanov	Kazakhstan	54:34		> >
	César Herrera	Colombia	DQ		~ ~ ~ ~ 230.7(c)
	David Hurtado	Ecuador	DQ		~ ~ ~ ~ 230.7(c)
	Eduardo Uria	United States	DQ		> ~ > ~ 230.7(c)

=== Team (Junior Men 10 km) ===
Rank	Team	Points
1	China	3
2	Japan	14
3	Australia	24
4	Spain	29
5	Belarus	30
6	Mexico	39
7	Italy	39
8	Colombia	40
9	France	42
10	Ecuador	53
11	Ukraine	58
12	Turkey	69
13	Peru	73
14	South Africa	78

=== Junior Women 10 km ===
Rank	Name	Nationality	Time	Notes	Penalties
1st place, gold medalist(s)	Alegna González	Mexico	45:08	AU20R	~
2nd place, silver medalist(s)	Glenda Morejón	Ecuador	45:13		~
3rd place, bronze medalist(s)	Nanako Fujii	Japan	45:29	PB	~ ~
4	Li Wenxiu	China	45:51		
5	Meryem Bekmez	Turkey	46:14		
6	Ma Li	China	46:49		
7	Noelia Vargas	Costa Rica	46:54	NU20R	~
8	Yang Weiwei	China	47:01		
9	Laura Chalarca	Colombia	47:06	PB	
10	Ayşe Tekdal	Turkey	47:29		~
11	Paula Milena Torres	Ecuador	47:53	PB	
12	Antía Chamosa	Spain	48:00		~
13	Mary Luz Andía	Peru	48:19	PB	
14	Maria Bernardo	Portugal	48:50	PB	>
15	Emily Villafuerte	Peru	49:20	PB	
16	Rebecca Henderson	Australia	49:25		
17	Maika Yagi	Japan	50:04		
18	Philippa Huse	Australia	50:25		~ ~
19	Mariona García	Spain	50:31		>
20	Marina Peña	Spain	50:42		
21	Joana Pontes	Portugal	50:50		
22	Lauren Harris	United States	51:02		
23	Julia Richter	Germany	51:03		
24	Valeria Disabato	Italy	51:10		>
25	Guan-Ling Huang	Chinese Taipei	51:39	SB	~
26	Yuu Yoshida	Japan	51:43		
27	Yana Farina	Ukraine	51:44	PB	
28	Sarah Ali	France	51:49		
29	Austeja Kavaliauskaite	Lithuania	51:57		> >
30	Daryna Kasyan	Ukraine	52:17	PB	>
31	Yekaterina Shlykova	Kazakhstan	53:01		
32	Manon Lefresne	France	53:29		
33	Wei-Chiao Wu	Chinese Taipei	54:20	SB	
34	Alina Tkach	Ukraine	55:48	PB	
35	Klaudia Žárska	Slovakia	55:54		
36	Kayla Torres	United States	56:01		
37	Kayla Allen	United States	59:35		
	Inês Reis	Portugal	DNF		
	Valentina Zalevskaya	Kazakhstan	DNF		>
	Kader Dost	Turkey	DQ		~ ~ ~ ~ 230.7(c)
	Katie Hayward	Australia	DQ		~ ~ ~ ~ 230.7(c)
	Yasury Betzayda Lorena Palacios	Guatemala	DQ		~ ~ ~ ~ 230.7(c)

=== Team (Junior Women 10 km) ===
Rank	Team	Points
1	China	10
2	Ecuador	13
3	Turkey	15
4	Japan	20
5	Peru	28
6	Spain	31
7	Australia	34
8	Portugal	35
9	Ukraine	57
10	Chinese Taipei	58
11	United States	58
12	France	60

== Medal table ==
=== Overall ===
Overall of the 12 events senior and junior (men and women).

* Host nation (China)

Rank	Nation	Gold	Silver	Bronze	Total
1	China (CHN)*	6	4	2	12
2	Japan (JPN)	4	2	2	8
3	Mexico (MEX)	2	0	0	2
4	Ecuador (ECU)	0	3	0	3
5	Italy (ITA)	0	2	1	3
6	Ukraine (UKR)	0	1	1	2
7	Australia (AUS)	0	0	2	2
8	Guatemala (GUA)	0	0	1	1
8	Poland (POL)	0	0	1	1
8	Spain (ESP)	0	0	1	1
8	Turkey (TUR)	0	0	1	1
Totals (11 entries)		12	12	12	36

=== Senior ===
Men and women's 4 events (individual and team)

* Host nation (China)

Rank	Nation	Gold	Silver	Bronze	Total
1	Japan (JPN)	4	1	1	6
2	China (CHN)*	3	3	2	8
3	Mexico (MEX)	1	0	0	1
4	Italy (ITA)	0	2	1	3
5	Ukraine (UKR)	0	1	1	2
6	Ecuador (ECU)	0	1	0	1
7	Australia (AUS)	0	0	1	1
7	Poland (POL)	0	0	1	1
7	Spain (ESP)	0	0	1	1
Totals (9 entries)		8	8	8	24

== See also ==
- Chinese Race Walking Grand Prix
