= 2019 World Athletics Rankings =

2019 IAAF World Rankings
- Organizer: World Athletics
- Edition: 1st

The 2019 World Athletics Rankings document the best performing athletes in the sport of athletics, per the World Athletics individual athlete ranking system. It was the first year that the IAAF used the system. Individual athletes are assigned a points score best on an average of their best recent competition performances. The performance scoring is primarily based on the time or mark of the athlete, plus additional points for their placing within the competition, and some minor modifications based on the conditions. The world rankings are updated each Wednesday.

As of 31 March 2020, the number one ranked male athlete is Armand Duplantis with 1515 points, and the number one ranked female athlete is Sifan Hassan with 1528 points.

== Overall rankings (top 10) ==
Men (as of 31 March 2020)
#	Athlete	Nation	Event(s)	Points
1	Armand Duplantis	Sweden (SWE)	Pole vault	1515
2	Noah Lyles	United States (USA)	100 metres, 200 metres	1505
3	Karsten Warholm	Norway (NOR)	400 metres hurdles	1503
4	Christian Coleman	United States (USA)	100 metres	1477
5	Sam Kendricks	United States (USA)	Pole vault	1474
6	Tom Walsh	New Zealand (NZL)	Shot put	1470
7	Rai Benjamin	United States (USA)	400 metres hurdles	1466
8	Christian Taylor	United States (USA)	Triple jump	1465
8	Timothy Cheruiyot	Kenya (KEN)	1500 metres	1465
10	Daniel Ståhl	Sweden (SWE)	Discus throw	1464

Women (as of 31 March 2020)
#	Athlete	Nation	Event(s)	Points
1	Sifan Hassan	Netherlands (NED)	1500 metres, 5000 metres	1528
2	Dina Asher-Smith	Great Britain (GBR)	100 metres, 200 metres	1494
3	Beatrice Chepkoech	Kenya (KEN)	3000 metres steeplechase	1479
4	Dalilah Muhammad	United States (USA)	400 metres hurdles	1478
5	Mariya Lasitskene	Russia (RUS)	High jump	1477
6	Shaunae Miller	Bahamas (BAH)	200 metres, 400 metres	1467
7	Shelly-Ann Fraser-Pryce	Jamaica (JAM)	100 metres	1465
7	Malaika Mihambo	Germany (GER)	Long jump	1465
9	Yulimar Rojas	Venezuela (VEN)	Triple jump	1463
10	Salwa Eid Naser	Bahrain (BHR)	400 metres	1460

== Event rankings (top 10) ==
IAAF World Rankings, as of 17 September 2019.

=== 100 metres ===
Men

#	Athlete	Born	Points
1	(United States) Justin Gatlin	10 Feb 1982	1386
2	(United States) Christian Coleman	06 Mar 1996	1378
3	(South Africa) Akani Simbine	21 Sep 1993	1359
4	(United Kingdom) Zharnel Hughes	13 Jul 1995	1354
5	(Jamaica) Yohan Blake	26 Dec 1989	1344
6	(United States) Michael Rodgers	24 Apr 1985	1342
7	(China) Zhenye Xie	17 Aug 1993	1324
8	(United States) Noah Lyles	18 Jul 1997	1322
9	(Canada) Andre De Grasse	10 Nov 1994	1320
10	(Ivory Coast) Arthur Cissé	29 Dec 1996	1298

Women

#	Athlete	Born	Points
1	(United Kingdom) Dina Asher-Smith	04 Dec 1995	1406
2	(Jamaica) Shelly-Ann Fraser-Pryce	27 Dec 1986	1399
3	(Jamaica) Elaine Thompson	28 Jun 1992	1364
4	(Ivory Coast) Marie-Josée Ta Lou	18 Nov 1988	1358
5	(Netherlands) Dafne Schippers	15 Jun 1992	1326
6	(United States) Aleia Hobbs	24 Feb 1996	1321
7	(Nigeria) Blessing Okagbare	09 Oct 1988	1312
8	(Germany) Gina Lückenkemper	21 Nov 1996	1294
9	(Poland) Ewa Swoboda	26 Jul 1997	1291
10	(Canada) Crystal Emmanuel	27 Nov 1991	1282

=== 20 km racewalking ===
Men

#	Athlete	Born	Points
1	(Japan) Toshikazu Yamanishi	15 Feb 1996	1329
2	(Japan) Koki Ikeda	03 May 1998	1279
3	(Spain) Diego García	19 Jan 1996	1278
4	(Italy) Massimo Stano	27 Feb 1992	1277
5	(China) Wang Kaihua	16 Feb 1994	1271
5	(Sweden) Perseus Karlström	02 May 1990	1271
7	(Colombia) Éider Arévalo	09 Mar 1993	1267
8	(Authorised Neutral Athletes) Vasiliy Mizinov	29 Dec 1997	1259
9	(Japan) Eiki Takahashi	19 Nov 1992	1254
10	(Spain) Álvaro Martín	18 Jun 1994	1249

Women

#	Athlete	Born	Points
1	(China) Qieyang Shenjie	11 Nov 1990	1300
2	(China) Yang Jiayu	18 Feb 1996	1284
3	(Brazil) Érica de Sena	03 May 1985	1250
4	(Colombia) Sandra Arenas	17 Sep 1993	1241
5	(Spain) Maria Pérez	29 Apr 1996	1239
6	(China) Liu Hong	12 May 1987	1233
7	(Italy) Eleonora Giorgi	14 Sep 1989	1232
8	(Czech Republic) Anežka Drahotová	22 Jul 1995	1229
9	(Peru) Kimberly García	19 Oct 1993	1223
10	(China) Ma Zhenxia	01 Aug 1998	1213

=== 50 km racewalking ===
Men

#	Athlete	Born	Points
1	(Ukraine) Maryan Zakalnytskyy	20 Aug 1994	1308
2	(Japan) Hirooki Arai	18 May 1988	1297
3	(Japan) Satoshi Maruo	28 Nov 1991	1280
4	(Sweden) Matej Tóth	10 Feb 1983	1267
4	(Japan) Hayato Katsuki	28 Nov 1990	1267
6	(Japan) Yusuke Suzuki	02 Jan 1988	1264
7	(China) Wang Qin	08 May 1994	1257
8	(Belarus) Dmitriy Dziubin	12 Jul 1990	1256
9	(Japan) Masatora Kawano	23 Oct 1998	1255
10	(France) Yohann Diniz	01 Jan 1978	1253

Women

#	Athlete	Born	Points
1	(China) Rui Liang	18 Jun 1994	1313
2	(Portugal) Inês Henriques	01 May 1980	1305
3	(Spain) Júlia Takács	29 Jun 1989	1292
4	(China) Hong Liu	12 May 1987	1278
5	(Ecuador) Johana Ordóňez	12 Dec 1987	1276
6	(Australia) Claire Woods	06 Jul 1981	1270
7	(Ecuador) Paola Viviana Pérez	21 Dec 1989	1266
8	(China) Faying Ma	30 Aug 1993	1260
9	(Italy) Eleonora Anna Giorgi	14 Sep 1989	1259
10	(China) Maocuo Li	20 Oct 1992	1257
