= 2019 World Athletics Championships – Women's 50 kilometres walk =

Women's 50 kilometres walk at the 2019 World Championships
- Venue: Khalifa International Stadium
- Dates: 28 September
- Competitors: 23 from 13 nations
- Winning time: 4:23:26

Medalists
| gold medal | Liang Rui | China |
| silver medal | Li Maocuo | China |
| bronze medal | Eleonora Giorgi | Italy |

The women's 50 kilometres walk at the 2019 World Athletics Championships was held in Doha, Qatar, on 28 September 2019.

== Records ==
Before the competition records were as follows:

| Record | Perf. | Athlete | Nat. | Date | Location |
|---|---|---|---|---|---|
| World | 3:59:15 | Liu Hong | CHN | 9 Mar 2019 | Huangshan, China |
| Championship | 4:05:56 | Inês Henriques | POR | 13 Aug 2017 | London, Great Britain |
| World leading | 3:57:08 | Klavdiya Afanasyeva | RUS | 15 Jun 2019 | Cheboksary, Russia |
| African | 4:48:00 | Natalie le Roux | RSA | 5 Jan 2018 | Taicang, China |
| Asian Record | 3:59:15 | Liu Hong | CHN | 15 Jan 2017 | Huangshan, China |
| NACAC | 4:13:56 | Mirna Ortiz | GUA | 24 Feb 2019 | Guatemala City, Guatemala |
| South American | 4:11:12 | Johana Ordóñez | ECU | 11 Aug 2019 | Lima, Peru |
| European | 4:04:50 | Eleonora Anna Giorgi | ITA | 15 Jan 2017 | Alytus, Lithuania |
| Oceanian | 4:09:33 | Claire Tallent | AUS | 5 May 2018 | Taicang, China |

== Schedule ==
The event schedule, in local time (UTC+3), was as follows:

| Date | Time | Round |
|---|---|---|
| 28 September | 23:30 | Final |

== Results ==
The final was started at 23:30.

| Rank | Name | Nationality | Time | Notes |
|---|---|---|---|---|
| 1st place, gold medalist(s) | Liang Rui | China | 4:23:26 | |
| 2nd place, silver medalist(s) | Li Maocuo | China | 4:26:40 | |
| 3rd place, bronze medalist(s) | Eleonora Giorgi | Italy | 4:29:13 | |
| 4 | Olena Sobchuk | Ukraine | 4:33:38 | |
| 5 | Ma Faying | China | 4:34:56 | |
| 6 | Khrystyna Yudkina | Ukraine | 4:36:00 | |
| 7 | Magaly Bonilla | Ecuador | 4:37:03 | |
| 8 | Júlia Takács | Spain | 4:38:20 | |
| 9 | Paola Pérez | Ecuador | 4:38:54 | |
| 10 | Mar Juárez | Spain | 4:39:28 | |
| 11 | Masumi Fuchise | Japan | 4:41:02 | |
| 12 | Nastassia Yatsevich | Belarus | 4:44:01 | |
| 13 | Nadzeya Darazhuk | Belarus | 4:47:26 | |
| 14 | Angeliki Makri | Greece | 4:54:09 | |
| 15 | Mara Ribeiro | Portugal | 4:58:44 | |
| 16 | Elianay Pereira | Brazil | 5:11:26 | |
| 17 | Katie Burnett | United States | 5:23:05 | |
| | Mariavittoria Becchetti | Italy | DNF | |
| | Nicole Colombi | Italy | DNF | |
| | Mária Czaková | Slovakia | DNF | |
| | Inês Henriques | Portugal | DNF | |
| | Valentyna Myronchuk | Ukraine | DNF | |
| | Ivana Renić | Croatia | DNF | |
| | Tiia Kuikka | Finland | DNS | |
