= Portugal at the 2019 World Athletics Championships =

- WA code: POR

in Doha, Qatar
- Competitors: 15 (4 men and 11 women) in 10 events
- Medals Ranked 27th: Gold 0 Silver 1 Bronze 0 Total 1

World Athletics Championships appearances
- 1980; 1983; 1987; 1991; 1993; 1995; 1997; 1999; 2001; 2003; 2005; 2007; 2009; 2011; 2013; 2015; 2017; 2019; 2022; 2023

Portugal competed at the 2019 World Athletics Championships in Doha, Qatar from 27 September to 6 October 2019. The country finished in 27th place in the medal table.

== Medalists ==
Medal	Athlete	Event	Date
Silver	João Vieira	Men's 50 kilometres walk	September 28

== Results ==
(q – qualified, NM – no mark, SB – season best)

=== Men ===
Track and road events

Athlete	Event	Heat		Semifinal		Final	
Athlete	Event	Result	Rank	Result	Rank	Result	Rank
João Vieira	50 km walk	—				4:04:59	2nd place, silver medalist(s)

Field events

Athlete	Event	Qualification		Final	
Athlete	Event	Result	Rank	Result	Rank
Pedro Pichardo	Triple jump	17.38	1 Q	17.62 SB	4
Nelson Évora	Triple jump	16.80	15	did not advance	
Francisco Belo	Shot put	19.52	32	did not advance	

=== Women ===
Track and road events

Athlete	Event	Heat		Semifinal		Final	
Athlete	Event	Result	Rank	Result	Rank	Result	Rank
Lorène Bazolo	100 m	11.51	38	did not advance			
Cátia Azevedo	400 m	52.79	40	did not advance			
Carla Salomé Rocha	Marathon	—				2:58:19	28
Ana Cabecinha	20 km walk	—				1:36:31	9
Mara Ribeiro	50 km walk	—				4:58:44	15
Inês Henriques	50 km walk	—				Did not finish	

Field events

Athlete	Event	Qualification		Final	
Athlete	Event	Result	Rank	Result	Rank
Patrícia Mamona	Triple jump	14.21	10 q	14.40	8
Evelise Veiga	Triple jump	13.89	18	did not advance	
Susana Costa	Triple jump	13.77	20	did not advance	
Irina Rodrigues	Discus throw	56.21	23	did not advance	
Liliana Cá	Discus throw	54.31	26	did not advance	
