= 2021 European Athletics U23 Championships – Women's 20 kilometres walk =

Women's 20 kilometres walk at the 2021 European Athletics U23 Championships
- Venue: Kadriorg Stadium, Tallinn
- Dates: 9 July
- Competitors: 20 from 11 nations
- Winning time: 1:33:08

Medalists
gold medal	Meryem Bekmez	Turkey
silver medal	Pauline Stey	France
bronze medal	Antia Chamosa	Spain

The women's 20 kilometres walk event at the 2021 European Athletics U23 Championships was held in Tallinn, Estonia, at Kadriorg Stadium on 9 July.

== Records ==
Prior to the competition, the records were as follows:

European U23 record	Elena Lashmanova (RUS)	1:25:02	London, United Kingdom	11 August 2012
Championship U23 record	Tatyana Shemyakina (RUS)	1:28:48	Debrecen, Hungary	14 July 2007

== Results ==
Rank	Name	Nationality	Time	Notes
1st place, gold medalist(s)	Meryem Bekmez	Turkey	1:33:08	
2nd place, silver medalist(s)	Pauline Stey	France	1:34:47	PB
3rd place, bronze medalist(s)	Antia Chamosa	Spain	1:35:04	PB
4	Camille Moutard	France	1:36:34	
5	Ayşe Tekdal	Turkey	1:37:43	
6	Evin Demir	Turkey	1:39:10	
7	Olga Fiaska	Greece	1:39:41	
8	Sara Buglisi	Italy	1:43:09	
9	Anniina Kivimäki	Finland	1:43:33	
10	Yana Farina	Ukraine	1:43:35	SB
11	Adrija Meškauskaitė	Lithuania	1:44:10	
12	Austėja Kavaliauskaitė	Lithuania	1:44:37	
13	Vittoria Giordani	Italy	1:45:55	
14	Ema Hačundová	Slovakia	1:46:14	
15	Hana Burzalová	Slovakia	1:47:04	
16	Maria Santos Bernardo	Portugal	1:48:42	
17	Alicia Sánchez	Spain	1:49:03	
18	Maria Seferiadi	Greece	1:49:41	
	Kiriaki Filtisakou	Greece	DNF	
	Elvira Khasanova	Authorised Neutral Athletes	DQ	
