= Ukraine at the 2019 World Athletics Championships =

Ukraine at the 2019 World Championships in Athletics

in (Qatar) Doha 27 September 2019 – 6 October 2019
- Competitors: 41 (17 men and 24 women) in 22 events
- Medals Ranked 21st: Gold 0 Silver 2 Bronze 0 Total 2

World Championships in Athletics appearances
- 1993; 1995; 1997; 1999; 2001; 2003; 2005; 2007; 2009; 2011; 2013; 2015; 2017; 2019; 2022; 2023

Ukraine competed at the 2019 World Championships in Athletics, which was held in Doha between 27 September and 6 October, in a team of 41 athletes (17 men and 24 women), who participated in 22 (out of 49) events. Four athletes had been included to the final entry lists but did not participate in the events including Anastasiia Bryzgina, Yana Kachur, Ivanna Avramchuk (all were entered for women's and mixed 4×400 relays) and Dmytro Bikulov (mixed 4×400 relay).

== Medalists ==
Event	Athlete	Medal	Date
High jump	Yaroslava Mahuchikh	2nd place, silver medalist(s)	30 September
Long jump	Maryna Bekh-Romanchuk	2nd place, silver medalist(s)	6 October

== Results ==
=== Men ===
==== Track and road events ====
Event	Athlete	SB	Heats		Semifinals		Final	
Event	Athlete	SB	Result	Place	Result	Place	Result	Place
200 metres	Serhiy Smelyk	20.36	20.39	18	20.55	18	Did not advance	
Marathon	Ihor Porozov	2:15:06					2:26:11	50
20 kilometres walk	Viktor Shumik	1:24:13					1:37:23	30
20 kilometres walk	Ivan Losev	1:21:50					1:35:42	28
20 kilometres walk	Eduard Zabuzhenko	1:22:16					1:41:04	34
50 kilometres walk	Maryan Zakalnytskyy	n/a					4:12:28 SB	9
50 kilometres walk	Ivan Banzeruk	3:48:40					DNF	—
50 kilometres walk	Valeriy Litanyuk	3:51:27					4:42:18	25

==== Field events ====
Event	Athlete	SB	Qualification		Final	
Event	Athlete	SB	Result	Place	Result	Place
High jump	Bohdan Bondarenko	2.31	NM	—	Did not advance	
High jump	Andriy Protsenko	2.32	2.26	14	Did not advance	
Hammer throw	Serhiy Perevoznikov	76.98	72.16	27	Did not advance	
Hammer throw	Mykhaylo Kokhan	76.68	76.56 Q	7	77.39 PB	5
Hammer throw	Serhiy Reheda	76.90	71.28	29	Did not advance	
Javelin throw	Oleksandr Nychyporchuk	81.99	72.75	30	Did not advance	

=== Women ===
==== Track and road events ====
Event	Athlete	SB	Heats		Semifinals		Final	
Event	Athlete	SB	Result	Place	Result	Place	Result	Place
800 metres	Nataliya Pryshchepa	1:59.13	2:03.22 Q	21	2:01.24	15	Did not advance	
800 metres	Olha Lyakhova	1:59.13	2:01.47 q	6	2:00.72	8	Did not advance	
100 metres hurdles	Hanna Plotitsyna	13.07	13.30	30	Did not advance			
400 metres hurdles	Anna Ryzhykova	54.64	55.11 Q	5	54.45 q SB	7	54.45 SB	7
4 × 400 metres relay	Kateryna Klymiuk; Olha Lyakhova; Tetyana Melnyk; Anna Ryzhykova	3:29.33	3:26.57 q SB	6			3:27.48	6
Marathon	Oleksandra Shafar	n/a					DNF	—
20 kilometers walk	Inna Kashyna	1:29:30					1:41:44	29
20 kilometers walk	Nadiya Borovska	n/a					1:38:35 SB	20
50 kilometers walk	Khrystyna Yudkina	4:19:57					4:36:00	6
50 kilometers walk	Valentyna Myronchuk	4:15:50					DNF	—
50 kilometers walk	Olena Sobchuk	4:17:07					4:33:38	4

==== Field events ====
Event	Athlete	SB	Qualification		Final	
Event	Athlete	SB	Result	Place	Result	Place
High jump	Yuliya Levchenko	2.02	1.92	9	2.00	4
High jump	Yaroslava Mahuchikh	2.00	1.94	4	2.04 WU20R	2nd place, silver medalist(s)
High jump	Iryna Herashchenko	1.99	1.85	23	Did not advance	
Pole vault	Maryna Kylypko	4.56	4.50	21	Did not advance	
Long jump	Maryna Bekh-Romanchuk	6.85	6.74 q	4	6.92	2nd place, silver medalist(s)
Triple jump	Olha Saladukha	14.49	14.32 Q	3	14.52	5
Triple jump	Anna Krasutska	14.15	13.16	25	Did not advance	
Hammer throw	Iryna Klymets	72.67	72.93 Q PB	5	73.56 PB	5
Hammer throw	Iryna Novozhylova	71.51	65.31	30	Did not advance	
Hammer throw	Alyona Shamotina	71.80	67.30	24	Did not advance	
Discus throw	Natalia Semenova	60.06	54.68	25	Did not advance	
Javelin throw	Hanna Hatsko-Fedusova	60.78	55.84	26	Did not advance	

=== Mixed ===
Event	Athletes	SB	Heats		Final	
Event	Athletes	SB	Result	Place	Result	Place
4 × 400 metres relay	Danylo Danylenko; Tetyana Melnyk; Kateryna Klymiuk; Oleksiy Pozdnyakov	3:16.65	3:17.50	13	Did not advance	
