= 2018 IAAF World U20 Championships – Women's 10,000 metres walk =

Women's 10,000 metres walk at the 2018 World U20 Championships
- Venue: Ratina Stadium
- Dates: 14 July
- Competitors: 34 from 24 nations
- Winning time: 44:13.88

Medalists
gold medal	Alegna González	Mexico
silver medal	Meryem Bekmez	Turkey
bronze medal	Glenda Morejón	Ecuador

The women's 10,000 metres race walk at the 2018 IAAF World U20 Championships was held at Ratina Stadium on 14 July.

== Summary ==
Alegna González entered as the pre-race favourite, having beaten Glenda Morejón and Nanako Fujii over the same distance two months earlier at the IAAF World Race Walking Team Championships in Taicang, China. On a warm morning in Tampere, Puerto Rico's Rachelle de Orbeta set the early pace, opening an eleven-second lead by the two-kilometre mark before being reeled in by the chasing pack, which included all three eventual medallists. Turkey's Meryem Bekmez made the first significant move of the race with 11 laps remaining, opening a four-second lead at the seven-kilometre mark, but González and Morejón moved up together and were back in contention by the eight-kilometre mark. Morejón pressed the pace with five laps to go, but González and Bekmez held her pace comfortably in her slipstream. With a lap and a half remaining, González moved to the front for the first time in the race, ending Morejón's title chances; Bekmez briefly resisted before González pulled clear in the closing stages to win by just under four seconds, taking her second major title of the season in a world U20-leading and North American U20 record time of 44:13.88. Bekmez held on for silver in a Turkish under-20 record of 44:17.69, with Morejón taking bronze in a South American under-20 record of 44:19.40.

== Records ==
Standing records prior to the 2018 IAAF World U20 Championships
World U20 Record	Anežka Drahotová (CZE)	42:47.25	Eugene, United States	23 July 2014
Championship Record	Anežka Drahotová (CZE)	42:47.25	Eugene, United States	23 July 2014
World U20 Leading	Li Ma (CHN)	45:20.59	Gifu, Japan	7 June 2018

== Results ==
Rank	Name	Nationality	Time	Note
1st place, gold medalist(s)	Alegna González	Mexico	44:13.88	WU20L, AU20R
2nd place, silver medalist(s)	Meryem Bekmez	Turkey	44:17.69	NU20R
3rd place, bronze medalist(s)	Glenda Morejón	Ecuador	44:19.40	AU20R
4	Nanako Fujii	Japan	45:08.68	PB
5	Katie Hayward	Australia	45:10.42	PB
6	Yuxia Shi	China	45:21.39	
7	Rachelle De Orbeta	Puerto Rico	45:23.05	NU20R
8	Ayşe Tekdal	Turkey	45:49.43	PB
9	Noelia Vargas	Costa Rica	45:51.58	NU20R
10	Taylor Ewert	United States	45:57.81	NU20R
11	Yajing Liu	China	46:45.47	
12	Mary Luz Andía	Peru	46:49.59	PB
13	Paula Milena Torres	Ecuador	47:53.17	PB
14	Orla O'Connor	Ireland	47:55.40	NU20R
15	Julia Richter	Germany	48:12.39	PB
16	Laura Chalarca	Colombia	48:16.19	PB
17	Antia Chamosa	Spain	48:34.50	PB
18	Emily Villafuerte	Peru	48:46.67	PB
19	Inês Reis	Portugal	48:51.51	
20	Mayra Karen Quispe	Bolivia	49:00.66	PB
21	Rihem Bouzid	Tunisia	49:22.95	PB
22	Anniina Kivimäki	Finland	49:27.78	PB
23	Maria Bernardo	Portugal	49:32.13	
24	Hana Burzalová	Slovakia	49:57.70	PB
25	Marina Peña	Spain	50:06.73	SB
26	Mare Betwe	Ethiopia	50:42.52	
27	Yasury Palacios	Guatemala	51:00.65	
28	Ema Hačundová	Slovakia	51:50.84	
29	Austėja Kavaliauskaitė	Lithuania	52:31.06	PB
30	Maidy Monge	Guatemala	52:38.37	
31	Yekaterina Shlykova	Kazakhstan	53:03.47	
32	Niamh O'Connor	Ireland	53:25.90	PB
33	Souad Azzi	Algeria	54:14.57	
	Lauren Harris	United States	DNF	
