= Alegna González =

Mexican racewalker (born 1999)

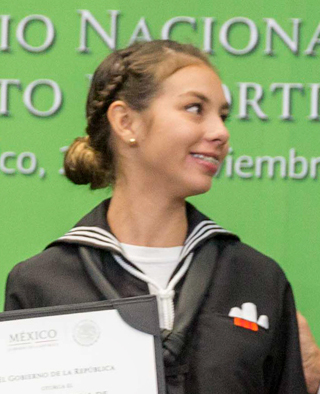
- González in 2018

Personal information
- Full name: Alegna Aryday González Muñoz
- Born: 2 January 1999 (age 27) Ojinaga, Chihuahua, Mexico
- Height: 1.58 m (5 ft 2 in)

Sport
- Sport: Athletics
- Event: Race walking
- Coached by: Ignacio Zamudio
Medal record
Women's athletics
Representing Mexico
World Championships
Silver medal – second place	2025 Tokyo	20 km walk
Central American and Caribbean Games
Gold medal – first place	2026 Santo Domingo	Half marathon walk
Central American Championships
Gold medal – first place	2020 San José	10,000 m walk
World U20 Championships
Gold medal – first place	2018 Tampere	10,000 m walk
World Team Championships (U20)
Gold medal – first place	2018 Taicang	10 km walk
Pan American U20 Championships
Gold medal – first place	2017 Trujillo	10,000 m walk
Pan American Cup (U20)
Gold medal – first place	2017 Lima	10 km walk

Alegna Aryday González Muñoz (born 2 January 1999) is a Mexican racewalking athlete who competed in the women's 20 kilometres walk at the 2020 Summer Olympics and obtained 5th place. She has been described by the Mexican press as a "racewalking princess" for her success at a young age.

== Career ==
González began training in the sport of athletics while in primary school, coached by her two uncles who had themselves been marathon runners. She often practiced in the evening due to the extreme heat. González was spotted by Ignacio Zamudio at the 2015 Olimpiada Nacional (National Olympics), who was impressed by her technique and offered to coach her. In May 2017, González won the 10,000 metre under-20 (U20) track race at the 18th Pan American Race Walking Cup in Peru. She returned to the country a few months later for the 2017 Pan American U20 Athletics Championships, where she won gold in the 10,000 metre track race with a championship (and national U20) record time of 44:43.89.

González broke her own continental U20 (road) record with a time of 45:08 to win gold in the junior 10 km race at the 2018 World Race Walking Team Championships. She then won a gold medal in the 10,000 metre event at the 2018 World U20 Championships in Finland with a time of 44:13.88, setting a new continental U20 record on the track as well. For her performances that year, González was given the National Award for Sport. She was also invited to the IAAF International Gala in Monaco, the first Mexican athlete to attend since Ana Guevara in 2002.

In April 2019, González finished second in the 20 km event at the Poděbrady Race Walking Meet with an Olympic standard time of 1:30:21, becoming the first Mexican athlete to secure her spot at the 2020 Summer Olympics. However, she suffered a knee injury that forced her to miss that year's Summer Universiade, Pan American Games and World Championships. She had qualified for all three events but ultimately decided to undergo surgery in June to ensure a full recovery. After the outbreak of the COVID-19 pandemic, González had to wait until December 2020 to compete again. In her return to competition, she captured the gold medal at the Central American Championships in Costa Rica in a time of 45:27.26 in the 10,000 m walk.

González opened her 2021 season by winning the 20 km race at the Costa Rican Race Walking Championships in 1:34:02 as an invited guest. In June she set a new personal best in the discipline at the Gran Premio Cantonés de La Coruña in Spain, recording a time of 1:28:40 for a second-place finish. The following week, González won the Mexican national title in the 10,000 m walk. At the delayed 2020 Olympic Games, she placed fifth in the women's 20 kilometres walk with a time of 1:30:33.

González placed fourth in the 20 km event at the 2022 World Race Walking Team Championships in Muscat, narrowly missing out on the podium with a time of 1:32:45. She captured another national title, this time in the 20 km walk, to qualify for the 2022 World Championships.

At the 2024 Summer Olympics in Paris, González again finished fifth in the 20 km walk, in a time of 1:27:14, and fifth again in the newly introduced mixed marathon walk relay alongside her teammates. She later said that her splits over the 10 and 11 km legs of the relay showed her she could compete at a higher level, calling it a turning point in her belief that she could contend for a medal rather than simply a top finish.

That belief paid off the following year. At the 2025 World Athletics Championships in Tokyo, González won the silver medal in the women's 20 km walk in a North, Central American and Caribbean record time of 1:26:06, finishing behind Spain's María Pérez and ahead of Japan's Nanako Fujii; it was her first medal at a senior global championship after four consecutive years finishing in the top eight at every major championship she contested. That July, she had also set a North American record of 2:44:28 for the 35 km walk at a meet in Dublin, Ireland. Celebrating draped in the Mexican flag after her Tokyo silver, she was congratulated by a journalist as the "pride of Ojinaga," her hometown; she responded by showing a magnet of Chihuahua, her home state, where her passion for racewalking had begun in primary school. "I have been searching for this medal for quite a while now," she said. "I asked myself what I needed to do to win a medal."

== Personal life ==
González grew up with a single mother in Ojinaga, Chihuahua. She moved from Ojinaga to Mexico City at the age of 16 to further her athletic development. She completed a degree in sports science at La Salle University in Mexico City in 2025.

== Achievements ==
All information taken from World Athletics profile.

=== Personal bests ===
Track walk

- 5000 m walk – 22:06.40 (Mexico City 2021)
- 10,000 m walk – 44:13.88 (Tampere 2018)

Road walk

- 10 km walk – 45:08 (Taicang 2018)
- 20 km walk – 1:26:06 NR (Tokyo 2025)
- 35 km walk – 2:44:28 NR (Dublin 2025)

=== International competitions ===
Year	Competition	Venue	Position	Event	Notes
Representing Mexico
2017	Pan American Race Walking Cup (U20)	Lima, Peru	1st	10 km road walk	45:17
2017	Pan American U20 Championships	Trujillo, Peru	1st	10,000 m track walk	44:43.89
2018	World Race Walking Team Championships (U20)	Taicang, China	1st	10 km road walk	45:08
2018	World U20 Championships	Tampere, Finland	1st	10,000 m track walk	44:13.88
2020	Central American Championships	San José, Costa Rica	1st	10,000 m track walk	45:27.26
2021	Olympic Games	Tokyo, Japan	5th	20 km road walk	1:30:33
2022	World Race Walking Team Championships	Muscat, Oman	4th	20 km road walk	1:32:45
2024	Olympic Games	Paris, France	5th	20 km road walk	1:27:14
2024	Olympic Games	Paris, France	5th	Mixed marathon walk relay	1:27:26
2025	2025 World Athletics Championships	Tokyo, Japan	2nd	20 km road walk	1:26:06 NR
2025	World Athletics Race Walking Tour	Dublin, Ireland	1st	35 km road walk	2:44:28 NR

=== National titles ===
- Mexican Athletics Championships
  - 10,000 metres walk: 2021
  - 20 km walk: 2022
