= Taicang Senior High School =

Taicang senior high school
- 太仓高级中学
- Taicang, Jiangsu; China

Information
- Type: Public
- Motto: 志远业精 (pinyin：ZhìYuǎnYèJīng)严谨认真 (pinyin：YánJǐngRènZhēn) 勤学善思 (pinyin：QínXuéShànSī)
- Established: 1995
- Principal: Sun Junqi（孙君琪）
- Vice Principal for the Rule of Law: Dai Huiya (戴惠亚)
- Faculty: 170
- Enrollment: 2066
- Classes: 41
- Area: 26,000 square meters
- Website: stg.tc.cn

Taicang Senior High School （太仓高级中学，pinyin:TàiCāngGāoJíZhōngXué， abbreviation:省太高, pinyin:ShěngTàiGāo）is a high school in Taicang, Suzhou, China.

The student usually call themselves as Taigaoren(太高人，pinyin：TàiGāoRén)

== History ==
Taicang Senior High School is an all-day school constructed in Jiangsu province. It has a history of almost one hundred years. It was developed from the senior high school department of another school called Taicang the First Middle School.

In July, 1995, the school's construction was finished and it was officially named Taicang senior high school. It began to independently recruit students. In March, 1997, the school was honored as "Jiangsu provincial key high school". In July, 1998, it gained another award, the title of "Provincial High School". In April, 1999, it was affirmed as a provincial "National Level Demonstrative High School" after strict assessment. In March, 2004, the school was finally evaluated as "Provincial Four-Star Level High School".

Evaluation of a school is based, to some extent, is on the graduation rates. The reason why Taicang Senior High School gains a high reputation all over the city mostly due to its good graduation rates.

Title	Number
Professorial Senior Teacher of Middle School	2
senior teacher	57
municipal famous teacher	4
leading teacher in certain subjects in Suzhou	12
leading teacher in certain subjects in Taicang	38

== Facilities ==
=== Library ===
School libraries provide students with space to do some independent studies after class. Today, quality education has promoted library up to the position where it acts as one of the three main pillars in modern education. Learning the function of library and holding the school motto educating people oriented, Taicang senior high school accelerates its pace to develop the construction of school library. Now, whether in the field of advanced inside hardware facilities or the software facilities containing standardized management and warm service, etc., this library has achieved obvious improvements and has entered a new stage.

The history of the library's progress can be divided into two stages by the official opening of the new library in April, 2001.

- The first stage is from 1995 to the year 2001. In 1995, with the completion of the school, the earliest library was built. At that time, the library did not progress fully integrated equipment and spacious environment. It was located on the first and second floor of the office building, which covers an area of 500 square meters. The first floor functioned as student newspaper reading room for students. The upper one had the roles of stack, reading room for teachers and reference room. In 1997, as the school continued to improve the whole systems, three librarians were introduced in succession. Before they officially began their work, the school had found professionals to train them. Since then, the number of new books, newspapers and magazines sharply increased each year. Until 2001 when the new library was finished, the total number has been up to 65,000 from zero. The types of magazines and newspapers are over 200.
- The second stage is from 2001 to the present. In 2001, with the help of the government and the company called "Shunhui" (simplified Chinese: 春晖) in Changzhou, a new library was built in south campus. The new one is much bigger than the old. Its area is approximately 3,450 square meters. For the hardware facilities, library sets up computer control system and provides lots of new service, such as electronic reading rooms and different sizes of lecture halls. Besides that, in the end of November in 2002, the total quantity of books including both paper books and e-books reached up to 105,000 and the types of magazines and newspapers increased to 330. An electronic stack room owning 40,000 books was established. For the software facilities, the school leaders also paid high attention. They strengthen the training about computer skills for librarians. More staff were employed by the school for the purpose of improving the library's management and service. What's more, some activities were held, for example the assessment of "My Favourite Ten Books".

=== Laboratory ===
Science grows perceptibly in Taicang senior high school. In order to provide students with better environment to do experiments, the school accelerates its pace to construct more labs for different courses like physics, biology or chemistry class. Furthermore, the school opens some lab lessons and the final aim is to guarantee the efficient performance of all curricula, containing national, local and school itself courses.

Although now the inside devices are not very complete, the school has noticed the defect and is taking actions to make up. In 2011， it issued the public bidding announcement about purchasing of digital lab equipment for its new campus.

=== Stadium ===
Taicang Senior High School does not only pay attention to the students' grades, but also share much attention to students' physical health. Insisting on the above principle, it organized various types of sports activities, such as school sports game, basketball and football competitions. When the national students sports program, "Sunny sport" was launched throughout hundreds of millions of students from primary, middle schools and universities in China, Taicang Senior High School was heeding the call of country and actively participated in this national game. In 2009, due to the school's outstanding performance in this field, it was conferred with the title of "Sunny Sport Advanced Unit". As the school intensifies its work of sports activities, a modern stadium is gradually improved. Inside the stadium, it has specialized basketball, badminton courts and tennis table rooms. The basketball court is quite big and the auditorium is set at the both sides of it. So many basketball competition were carried out in this stadium.

== Achievements ==
The following table briefly introduces several crucial awards achieved by Taicang senior high school in recent years.

Date	Awarded object	Competition	Award
2011	School Union		be conferred as 2010 municipal "School Union" advanced unit
2011	school library	the third municipal competition of library websites	the first prize
2011	school	the 2010 assessment of comprehensive education quality	the first prize
2011	school		be awarded as 2008–2010 Taicang civilized unit
28 June 2011	school	the Taicang Red Song Concert for celebrating the 90th Anniversary of Chinese Communist Party	the first prize
2010	school		the 2009 Taicang Peaceful School
2010	school		Provincial Healthy Improving School

More awards at or above the city level in the recent five years.

== Alumni and Alumnae ==
Take the 2008 college entrance examination for example. In 2008, the pattern of college entrance examination was suddenly changed a lot, which brought about big challenges for both teachers and graduating examinees. But Taicang senior high still finally handed out a satisfactory result. One student gained Suzhou Lee Tsung-Dao Scholarship and among the whole Suzhou city only six students gained this honour. Sixty-four students' college entrance examination scores ranked the top 10,000 among the provincial over 500,000 examinees. Altogether 466 students were admitted to key universities at or above two lines. Another eight students were admitted to art universities.

== Foreign Exchange ==
- Woodbridge School in England.
- University of Missouri in America.
- Summer Camp.
- Exchange student.
- International student.
