= List of World Athletics Championships records =

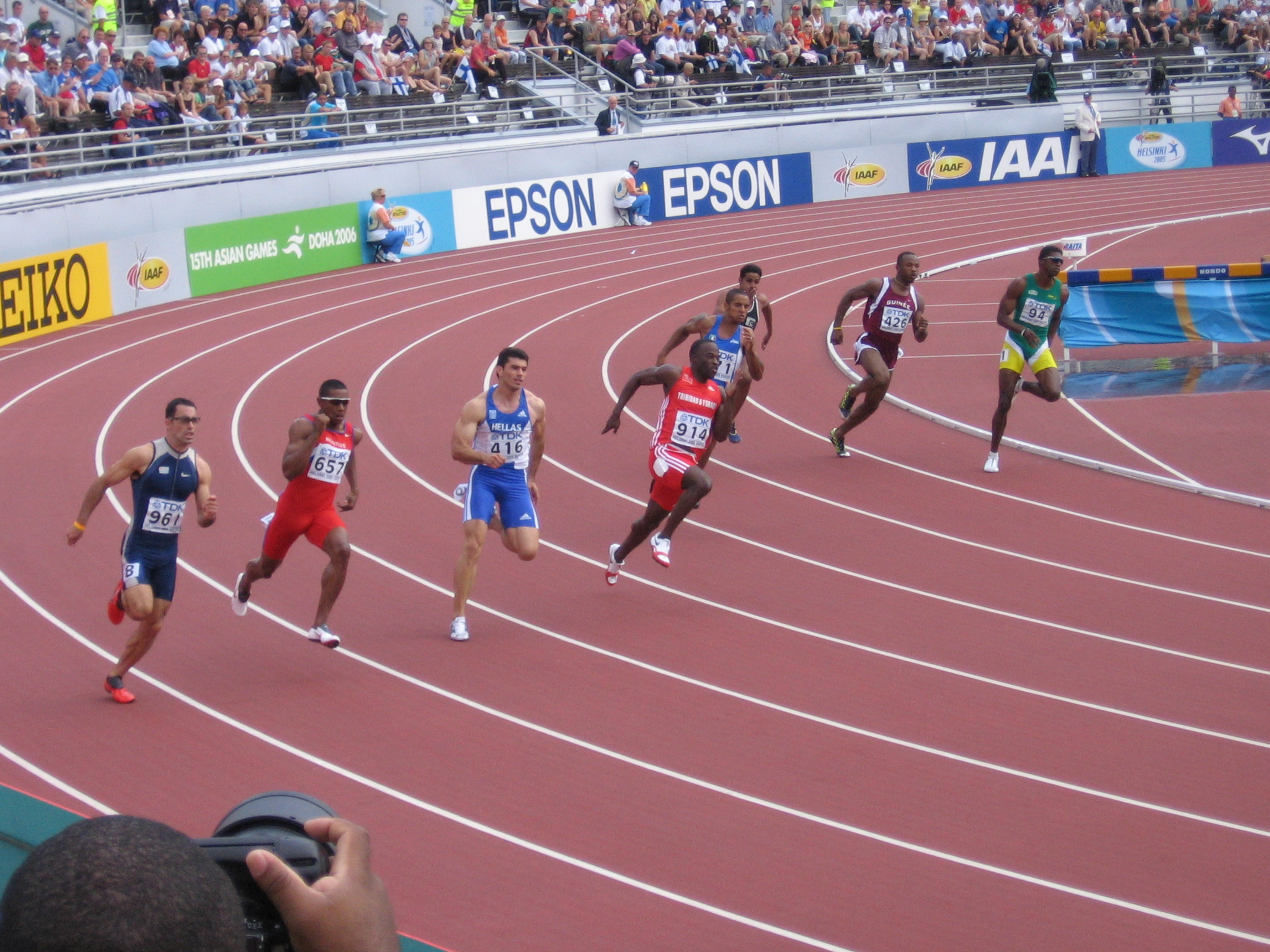
Athletes competing at the Helsinki Olympic Stadium where the first and tenth editions of the Championships were staged.

The World Athletics Championships is a biennial event which began in 1983. Organised by the International Association of Athletics Federations (IAAF), the World Championships are a competition comprising track and field athletics events available to male and female athletes from any of the IAAF's 213 member federations. Championship records are set when an athlete achieves the best mark in an event at one of the editions of the Championships. World, area, and national records have been set at the championships over the course of its history.

Competitors at the World Championships come from around the globe and records have been broken by athletes from all six continents. The United States has been the most successful competitor at the World Championships in both medals and records.

Four athletes hold multiple records:

- Usain Bolt holds records in the 100 and 200 metres as well as the 4 × 100 relay
- Michael Johnson holds individual and relay records in the 400 metres
- Jackie Joyner-Kersee broke both the heptathlon and long jump records
- Sydney McLaughlin-Levrone holds records in the 400 meters, 400 metres hurdles as well as the 4 × 400 relay

== Men ==
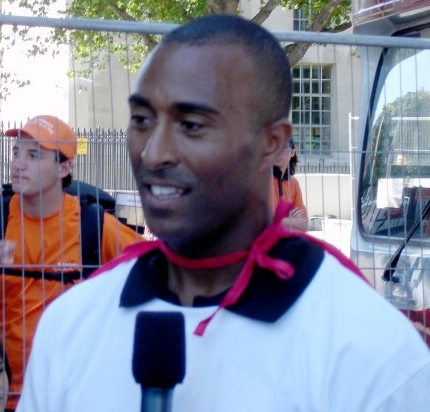
Colin Jackson broke the 110 metre hurdles world record in 1993; a record which stood for over a decade.

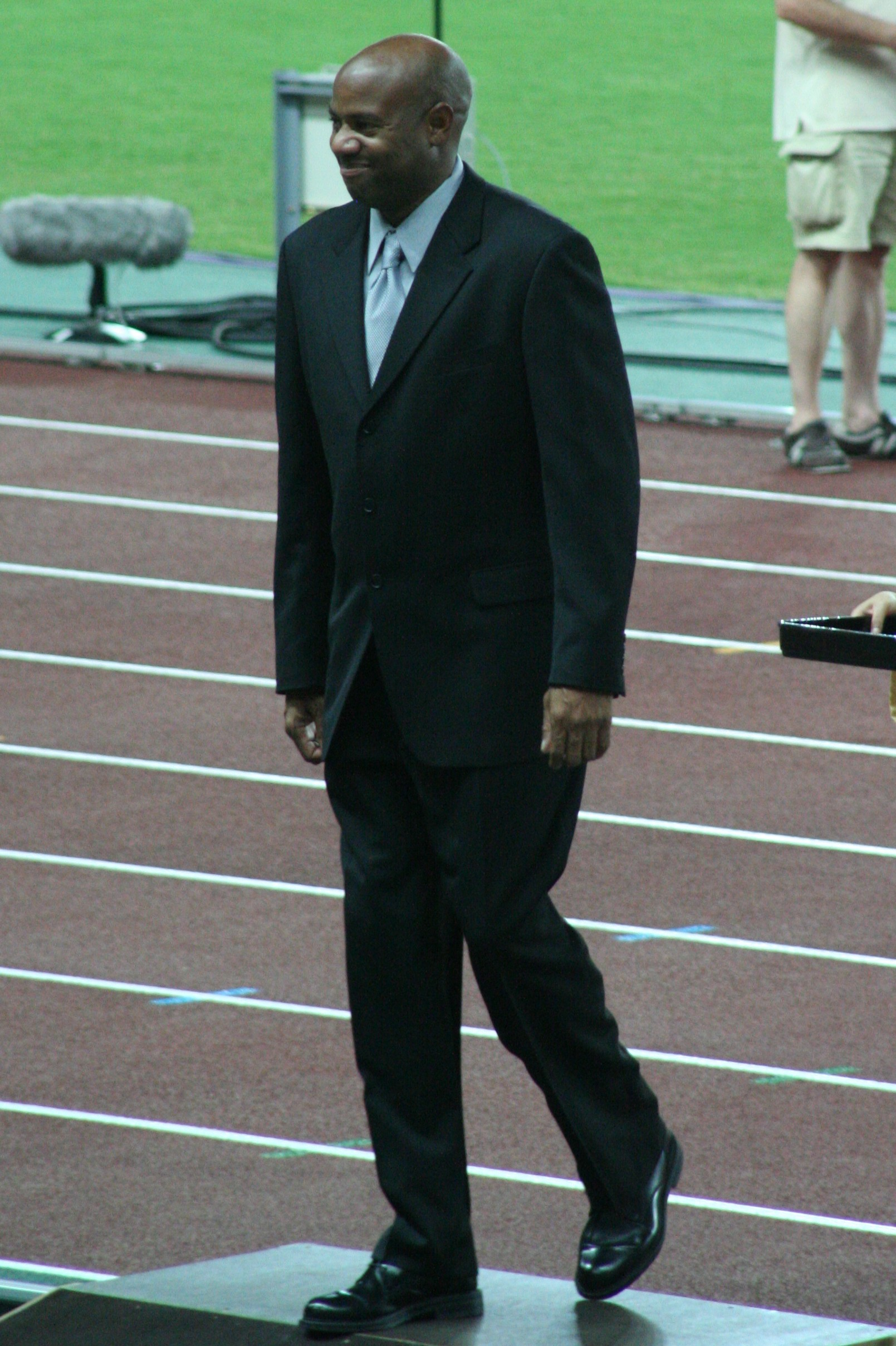
Mike Powell's world record long jump at the 1991 Championships has never been bettered.

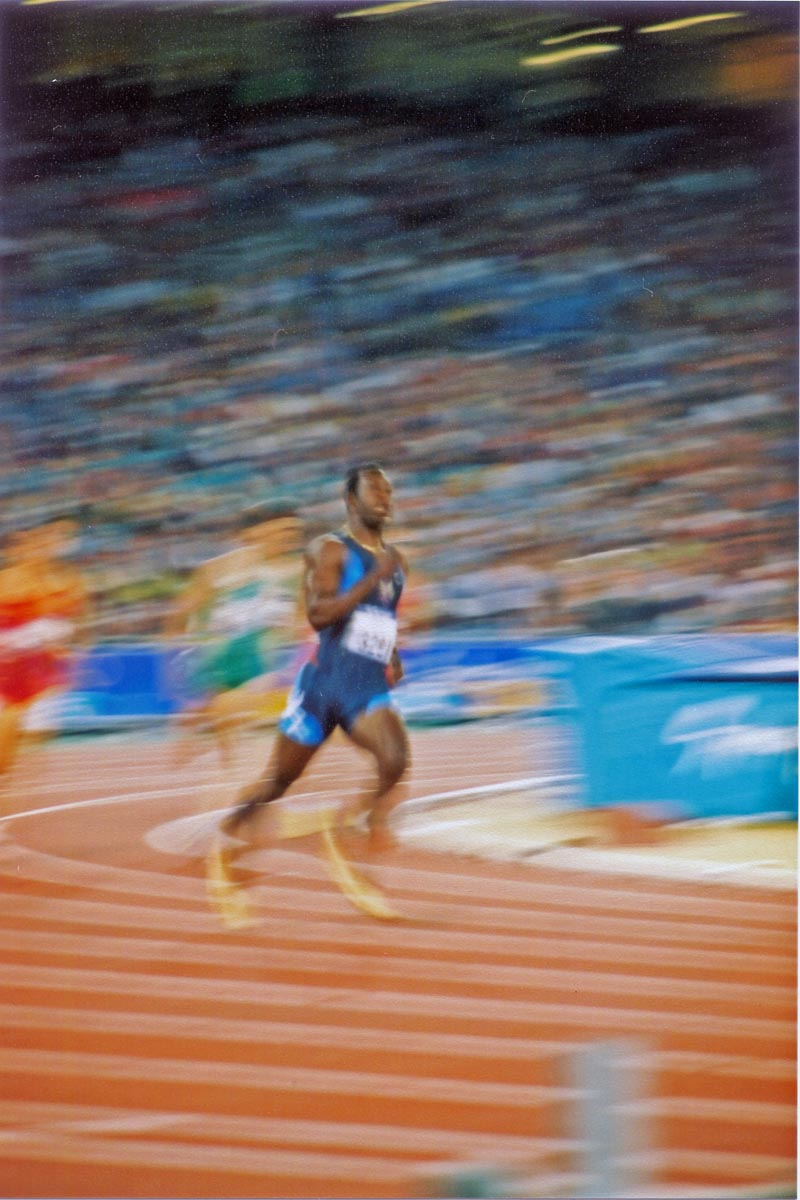
Double record holder Michael Johnson has held the 400 metres world championships record with his run in Seville for over 25 years.

- Key to tables:

not ratified or later rescinded by World Athletics

- Note: World records in **bold** are current world records, those in **bold italics** are former world records

Statistics are correct as of September 2025

Event	Record	Name	Location	Date	Ref.	Video
100 m	9.58 (+0.9 m/s) **WR**	Usain Bolt (JAM)	(Germany) Berlin	16 August 2009		
200 m	19.19 (−0.3 m/s) **WR**	Usain Bolt (JAM)	(Germany) Berlin	20 August 2009		
400 m	43.18 **WR**	Michael Johnson (USA)	(Spain) Sevilla	26 August 1999		
800 m	1:41.86	Emmanuel Wanyonyi (KEN)	(Japan) Tokyo	20 September 2025		
1500 m	3:27.65	Hicham El Guerrouj (MAR)	(Spain) Sevilla	24 August 1999		
5000 m	12:52.79	Eliud Kipchoge (KEN)	(France) Paris	31 August 2003		
10,000 m	26:46.31	Kenenisa Bekele (ETH)	(Germany) Berlin	17 August 2009		
Marathon	2:05:36	Tamirat Tola (ETH)	(United States) Eugene	17 July 2022		
110 m hurdles	12.91 (+0.5 m/s) **WR**	Colin Jackson (GBR)	(Germany) Stuttgart	20 August 1993		
400 m hurdles	46.29	Alison dos Santos (BRA)	(United States) Eugene	19 July 2022		
3000 m steeplechase	8:00.43	Ezekiel Kemboi (KEN)	(Germany) Berlin	18 August 2009		
High jump	2.41 m	Bohdan Bondarenko (UKR)	(Russia) Moscow	15 August 2013		
Pole vault	6.30 m **WR**	Armand Duplantis (SWE)	(Japan) Tokyo	15 September 2025		
Long jump	8.95 m (+0.3 m/s) **WR**	Mike Powell (USA)	(Japan) Tokyo	30 August 1991		
Triple jump	18.29 m (+1.3 m/s) **WR**	Jonathan Edwards (GBR)	(Sweden) Gothenburg	7 August 1995		
Shot put	23.51 m	Ryan Crouser (USA)	(Hungary) Budapest	19 August 2023		
Discus throw	71.46 m	Daniel Ståhl (SWE)	(Hungary) Budapest	21 August 2023		
Hammer throw	84.70 m	Ethan Katzberg (CAN)	(Japan) Tokyo	16 September 2025		
Javelin throw	92.80 m	Jan Železný (CZE)	(Canada) Edmonton	12 August 2001		
Decathlon	9045 pts **WR**	Ashton Eaton (USA)	(China) Beijing	28–29 August 2015		
Decathlon	100m (wind) / Long jump (wind) / Shot put / High jump / 400m / 110m H (wind) / Discus / Pole vault / Javelin / 1500m; 10.23 (−0.4 m/s) / 7.88 m (±0.0 m/s) / 14.52 m / 2.01 m / 45.00 / 13.69 (−0.2 m/s) / 43.34 m / 5.20 m / 63.63 m / 4:17.52					
20 km walk (road)	1:17:21 **WR**	Jefferson Pérez (ECU)	(France) Paris	23 August 2003		
35 km walk (road)	2:23:14	Massimo Stano (ITA)	(United States) Eugene	24 July 2022		
4 × 100 m relay	37.04	Jamaica (JAM); Nesta Carter; Michael Frater; Yohan Blake; Usain Bolt	(South Korea) Daegu	4 September 2011		
4 × 400 m relay	2:54.29 **WR**	United States (USA); Andrew Valmon; Quincy Watts; Butch Reynolds; Michael Johnson	(Germany) Stuttgart	22 August 1993		

Key:
**^{WR}** World record	**^{AR}** Area record	**^{NR}** National record	**^{PB}** Athlete's personal best

=== Past events ===
Event	Record	Name	Location	Date	Ref.
50 km walk (road) (defunct since 2019)	3:33:12	Yohann Diniz (FRA)	(United Kingdom) London	13 August 2017	

=== Decathlon disciplines ===
Event	Record	Athlete	Nation	Date	Championships	Place	Ref.
100 m	10.23	Ashton Eaton	United States	28 August 2015	2015 World Championships	Beijing, China	
Long jump	8.07 m	Tomáš Dvořák	Czech Republic	6 August 2001	2001 World Championships	Edmonton, Canada	
Shot put	17.54 m	Mike Smith	Canada	5 August 1997	1997 World Championships	Athens, Greece	
High jump	2.25 m	Christian Schenk	East Germany	3 September 1987	1987 World Championships	Rome, Italy	
400 m	45.00	Ashton Eaton	United States	28 August 2015	2015 World Championships	Beijing, China	
110 m hurdles	13.55	Frank Busemann	Germany	6 August 1997	1997 World Championships	Athens, Greece	
Discus throw	56.15 m	Leo Neugebauer	Germany	21 September 2025	2025 World Championships	Tokyo, Japan	
Pole vault	5.50 m	Sébastien Levicq	France	25 August 1999	1999 World Championships	Seville, Spain	
Javelin throw	79.05 m	Niklas Kaul	Germany	3 October 2019	2019 World Championships	Doha, Qatar	
1500 m	4:11.82	Beat Gähwiler	Switzerland	30 August 1991	1991 World Championships	Tokyo, Japan	

== Women ==
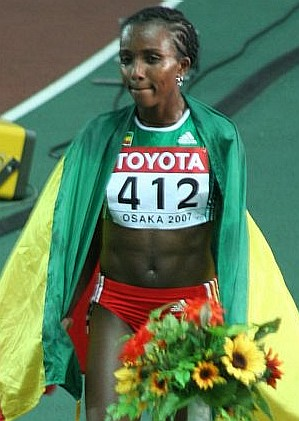
Tirunesh Dibaba was only 20 when she won two gold medals and set the 5000 metres record.

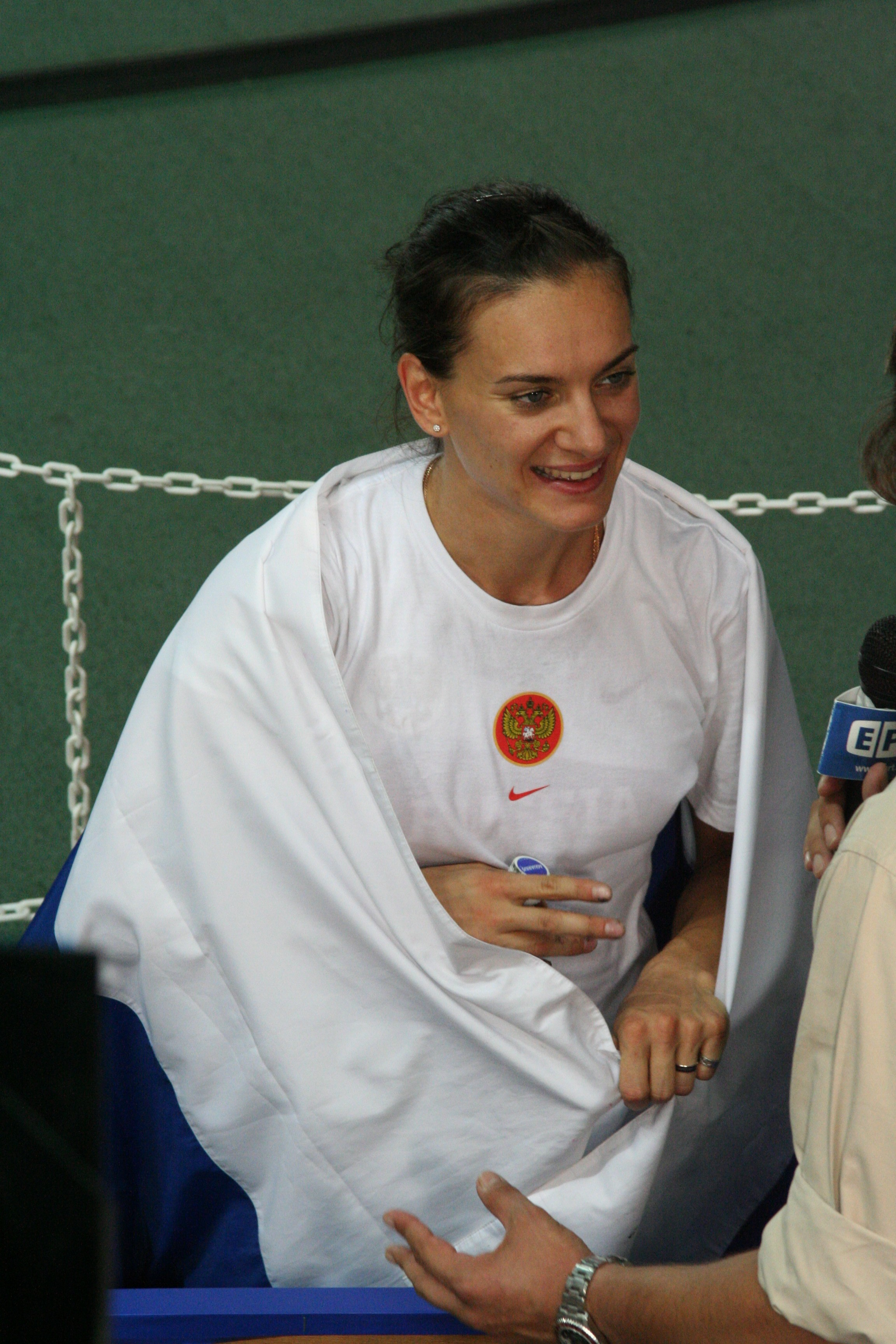
Yelena Isinbayeva broke the pole vault world record for the thirteenth time in 2005.

- Note: World records in **bold** are current world records, those in **bold italics** are former world records

Statistics are correct as of September 2025

Event	Record	Name	Location	Date	Ref.	Video
100 m	10.61 (+0.3 m/s)	Melissa Jefferson-Wooden (USA)	(Japan) Tokyo	14 September 2025		
200 m	21.41 (+0.1 m/s)	Shericka Jackson (JAM)	(Hungary) Budapest	25 August 2023		
400 m	47.78	Sydney McLaughlin-Levrone (USA)	(Japan) Tokyo	18 September 2025		
800 m	1:54.62	Lilian Odira (KEN)	(Japan) Tokyo	21 September 2025		
1500 m	3:51.95	Sifan Hassan (NED)	(Qatar) Doha	5 October 2019		
5000 m	14:26.72	Hellen Obiri (KEN)	(Qatar) Doha	5 October 2019		
10,000 m	30:04.18	Berhane Adere (ETH)	(France) Paris	23 August 2003		
100 m hurdles	12.12 **WR**	Tobi Amusan (NGR)	(United States) Eugene	24 July 2022		
100 m hurdles	12.06 (+2.5 m/s)	Tobi Amusan (NGR)	(United States) Eugene	24 July 2022		
400 m hurdles	50.68 **WR**	Sydney McLaughlin (USA)	(United States) Eugene	22 July 2022		
3000 m steeplechase	8:51.59	Faith Cherotich (KEN)	(Japan) Tokyo	17 September 2025		
Marathon	2:18:11	Gotytom Gebreslase (ETH)	(United States) Eugene	18 July 2022		
High jump	2.09 m **WR**	Stefka Kostadinova (BUL)	(Italy) Rome	30 August 1987		
Pole vault	5.01 m **WR**	Yelena Isinbayeva (RUS)	(Finland) Helsinki	12 August 2005		
Long jump	7.36 m (+0.4 m/s)	Jackie Joyner-Kersee (USA)	(Italy) Rome	4 September 1987		
Triple jump	15.50 m (+0.9 m/s) **WR**	Inessa Kravets (UKR)	(Sweden) Gothenburg	10 August 1995		
Shot put	21.24 m	Natalya Lisovskaya (URS)	(Italy) Rome	5 September 1987		
Shot put	21.24 m	Valerie Adams (NZL)	(South Korea) Daegu	29 August 2011		
Discus throw	71.62 m	Martina Hellmann (GDR)	(Italy) Rome	31 August 1987		
Hammer throw	80.85 m	Anita Włodarczyk (POL)	(China) Beijing	27 August 2015		
Javelin throw	71.70 m **WR**	Olisdeilys Menéndez (CUB)	(Finland) Helsinki	14 August 2005		
Javelin throw	71.99 m DQ	Mariya Abakumova (RUS)	(South Korea) Daegu	2 September 2011		
Heptathlon	7128 pts	Jackie Joyner-Kersee (USA)	(Italy) Rome	31 August – 1 September 1987		
Heptathlon	100m H (wind) / High jump / Shot put / 200m (wind) / Long jump (wind) / Javelin / 800m; 12.91 s (+0.2 m/s) / 1.90 m / 16.00 m / 22.95 s (+1.2 m/s) / 7.14 m (+0.9 m/s) / 45.68 m / 2:16.29					
20 km walk (road)	1:25:41	Olimpiada Ivanova (RUS)	(Finland) Helsinki	7 August 2005		
35 km walk (road)	2:38:40	María Pérez (ESP)	(Hungary) Budapest	24 August 2023		
4 × 100 m relay	41.03	United States (USA); Tamari Davis; Twanisha Terry; Gabrielle Thomas; Sha'Carri Richardson	(Hungary) Budapest	26 August 2023		
4 × 400 m relay	3:16.61	United States (USA); Isabella Whittaker; Lynna Irby-Jackson; Aaliyah Butler; Sydney McLaughlin-Levrone	(Japan) Tokyo	21 September 2025		

Key:
**^{WR}** World record	**^{AR}** Area record	**^{NR}** National record	**^{PB}** Athlete's personal best

=== Past events ===
Event	Record	Name	Location	Date	Ref.
3000 m (defunct since 1993)	8:28.71	Yunxia Qu (CHN)	(Germany) Stuttgart	16 August 1993	
10,000 m walk (track) (defunct since 1997)	42:55.49	Annarita Sidoti (ITA)	(Greece) Athens	7 August 1997	
10 km walk (road) (defunct since 1995)	42:13	Irina Stankina (RUS)	(Sweden) Gothenburg	7 August 1995	
50 km walk (road) (defunct since 2019)	4:05:56 **WR**	Inês Henriques (POR)	(United Kingdom) London	13 August 2017	

=== Heptathlon disciplines ===
Event	Record	Athlete	Nation	Date	Championships	Place	Ref.
100 m hurdles	12.58 (+0.4 m/s)	Kendell Williams	United States	2 October 2019	2019 World Championships	Doha, Qatar	
High jump	1.95 m	Carolina Klüft	Sweden	25 August 2007	2007 World Championships	Osaka, Japan	
High jump	1.95 m	Nafissatou Thiam	Belgium	5 August 2017	2017 World Championships	London, United Kingdom	
High jump	1.95 m	Yorgelis Rodríguez	Cuba	5 August 2017	2017 World Championships	London, United Kingdom	
High jump	1.95 m	Katarina Johnson-Thompson	Great Britain	2 October 2019	2019 World Championships	Doha, Qatar	
High jump	1.95 m	Nafissatou Thiam	Belgium	2 October 2019	2019 World Championships	Doha, Qatar	
High jump	1.95 m	Nafissatou Thiam	Belgium	17 July 2022	2022 World Championships	Eugene, United States	
Shot put	17.03 m	Austra Skujytė	Lithuania	25 August 2007	2007 World Championships	Osaka, Japan	
200 m	22.84	Dafne Schippers	Netherlands	12 August 2013	2013 World Championships	Moscow, Russia	
Long jump	7.14 m	Jackie Joyner-Kersee	United States	1 September 1987	1987 World Championships	Rome, Italy	
Javelin throw	59.57 m	Anouk Vetter	Netherlands	20 August 2023	2023 World Championships	Budapest, Hungary	
800 m	2:04.09	Anna Hall	United States	20 August 2023	2023 World Championships	Budapest, Hungary	

== Mixed ==
- Note: World records in **bold** are current world records, those in **bold italics** are former world records

Event	Record	Athlete	Nation	Date	Championships	Place	Ref.
4 × 400 m relay	3:08.80 **WR**	Justin Robinson (44.47); Rosey Effiong (50.38); Matthew Boling (45.13); Alexis Holmes (48.82)	United States	19 August 2023	2023 World Championships	Budapest, Hungary	
4 × 400 m relay	3:08.80	Bryce Deadmon; Lynna Irby-Jackson; Jenoah McKiver; Alexis Holmes	United States	13 September 2025	2025 World Championships	Tokyo, Japan	

== See also ==
- List of world records in athletics
- List of Olympic records in athletics
- List of Commonwealth Games records in athletics
- List of European Athletics Championships records
