= Eleonora Dominici =

Italian racewalker (born 1996)

Personal information
- National team: Italy: 2 caps (until 2020)
- Born: 22 February 1996 (age 30) Rome, Italy
- Height: 1.61 m (5 ft 3 in)
- Weight: 49 km

Sport
- Sport: Athletics
- Event: Racewalking
- Club: G.S. Fiamme Gialle
- Coached by: Mario De Benedictis

Achievements and titles
- Personal best: 20 km: 1:30:35 (2019)
Medal record
World Race Walking Cup
Silver medal – second place	2018 Taicang	Team 20 km
European Race Walking Cup
Silver medal – second place	2019 Alytus	Team 20 km

Eleonora Dominici (born 22 February 1996) is an Italian racewalker.

== Career ==
As well as Eleonora Giorgi, Antonella Palmisano, Valentina Trapletti, Mariavittoria Becchetti has established the minimum for the qualification for the Tokyo 2021 Olympics, set by the World Athletics at 1:31:00 to be achieved from 1 January 2019 to 31 May 2021. It will therefore be the Italian national team coach, Antonio La Torre to choose which will be the three athletes (maximum number allowed for each race) who will be able to represent the country at the Olympic Games.

== Achievements ==
Senior

Year	Competition	Venue	Rank	Event	Performance	Notes
2018	World Race Walking Cup	(China) Taicang	33rd	20 km walk	1:33:40	
2018	World Race Walking Cup	(China) Taicang	2nd	Team	38 pts	
2019	European Race Walking Cup	(Lithuania) Alytus	6th	20 km walk	1:31:30	
2019	European Race Walking Cup	(Lithuania) Alytus	2nd	Team	27 pts	

== See also ==
- Italian team at the running events
- Italy at the IAAF World Race Walking Cup
- Italy at the European Race Walking Cup
