= Angeliki Makri =

Greek racewalker

Personal information
- Born: 25 September 1978 (age 47)

Sport
- Country: Greece
- Sport: Racewalking

Angeliki Makri (born 25 September 1978) is a Greek racewalker. In 2019, she competed in the women's 50 kilometres walk at the 2019 World Athletics Championships held in Doha, Qatar. She finished in 14th place.
