= Shaxi, Jiangsu =

Coordinates: 31.5688°N 121.0608°E

Shaxi 沙溪镇
- Town
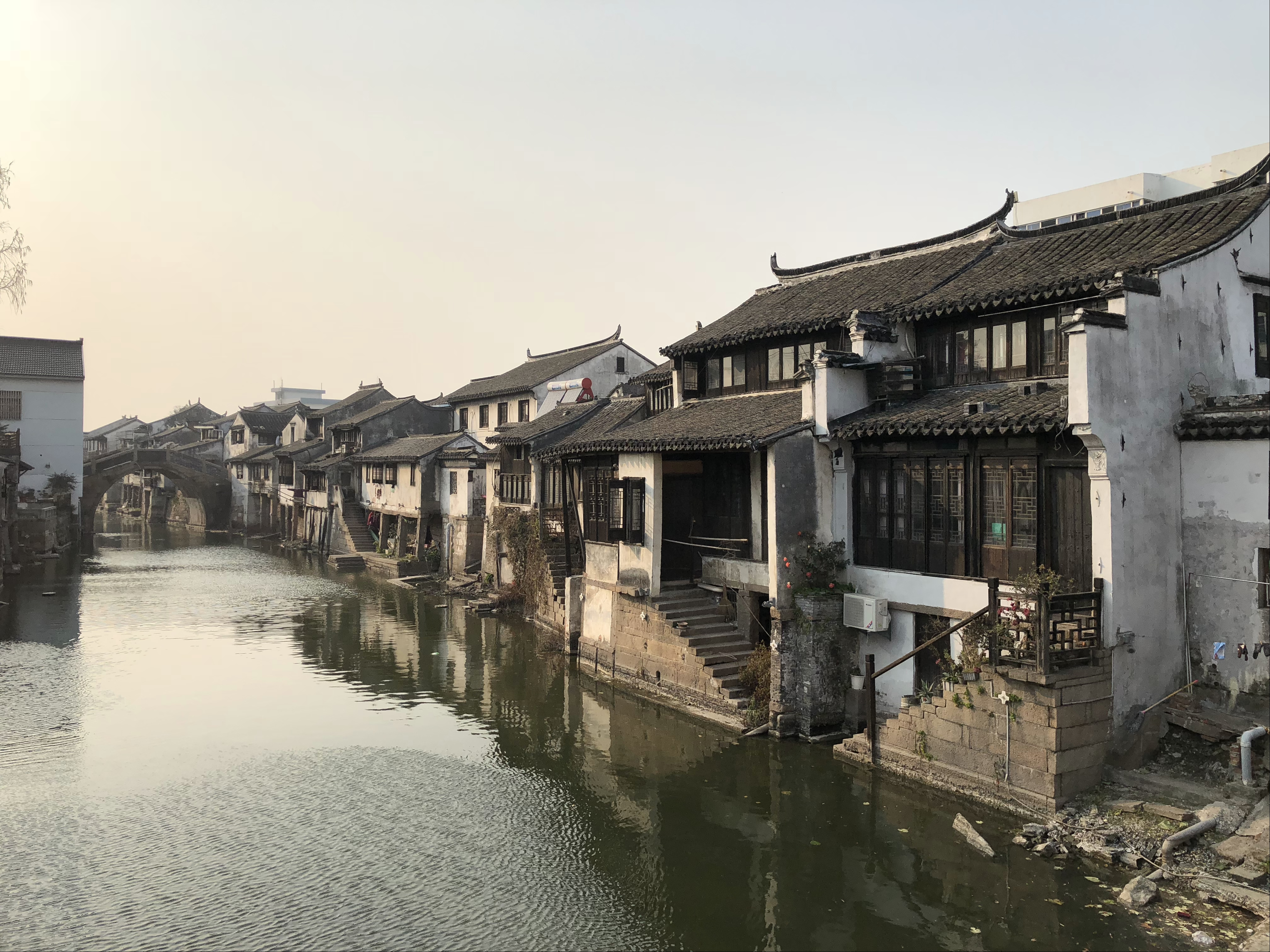
- Interactive map of Shaxi
- Country: People's Republic of China
- Province: Jiangsu
- Prefecture-level city: Suzhou
- County-level city: Taicang

Government
  - Town mayor: Chen Shunbao
  - Deputy mayor: Chen Yubi, Liang Huaxiang, Liang Dongxiao, Huang Zhenqiu
  - Party Secretary: Hu Yongkao
  - Chairman of People's Congress: Hu Yongkao

Area
  - Total: 132.41 km^{2} (51.12 sq mi)
- Website: www.shaxi.gov.cn

Shaxi (Chinese: 沙溪; pinyin: Shāxī; lit. 'sand creek') is a town of 91,000 in southeastern Jiangsu province, People's Republic of China, located in the middle of Taicang City's jurisdiction. It is about 50 kilometres (31 mi) away from Shanghai Hongqiao International Airport. An ancient town with traditional architecture, Shaxi has a long history and a distinctive culture.

== Origin ==
=== Yuan dynasty ===
The history of Shaxi can be dated back to the Yuan dynasty. According to historical records, around the time of the Dang dynasty and the Song dynasty, the town existed under a different name. After the time of the Yuan dynasty, it started to be called Shaxi. It was also called Qipu due to its proximity to the lake.

=== Ming dynasty ===
Starting in the Koji years of the Ming dynasty, the town became more and more prosperous. Many high ranking court ministers chose Shaxi as the site to build their mansions. Thank to this, the streets and allies boomed and became busy day and night.

=== Ming and Qing dynasties ===
At the time of the Ming and Qing dynasties, foreign culture and technology started to influence traditional life in Shaxi. With the development of business and commerce, numerous businesses sprung up in the streets, and they badly needed a designated place to carry on their various activities. Many constructions were built next to Qipu Lake and a stone bridge was built which crossed the lake. Since then, these unique constructions have become an essential part of the city.

Shaxi is also one of the important birthplaces of Chinese national industry and today it is the key industrial town in the region of Taicang. In Guang Xu, thirty-two years after the start of the Qing dynasty, the first industrial textile plant of Jiangsu province was established in Shaxi.

== City features ==
Shaxi, nicknamed "the second Zhouzhuang", has several features unique to the town.

=== Water construction ===
The old residences, considered cultural heritages, date back to the Qing dynasty. They sit at both sides of Qipu Lake, the whole length being approximately 1.5 kilometers. The window of these houses are interesting. Each pane has unique patterns, the only similarity being that they are all very delicate. There are stone steps leading from the houses to the river. To conclude, the water mansions, which present the simple and elegant posture, are treasured cultural heritages.

=== Stone arch bridge ===
In the old street, from east to west, there are three parallel old bridges built in Ming or Qing dynasty across Qipu Lake. The arch bridge combines with its shadow so that a circle is formed. In the river, several boats decorated by red lanterns are always casually floating with the wind. All the objects make the town seem more peaceful and harmonious.

=== Old street ===
In Shaxi, the old street is parallel to the Qipu Lake, at 1.5 kilometers long. At each side, the constructions are designed to display an elegant style. The roofs, windows, and the doors have carved patterns. The space between houses constitutes a long narrow lane. In recent days, on account of the investigation by the town government, some bronze persons who have different gestures are standing in the street. Nowadays, this old street has become a symbol of Shaxi.

== Scenic areas ==
=== Leyin Park ===
==== Derivation ====
Leyin Park (乐荫园; LèYīnYuán) was originally named Leyin Park (乐隐园; LèYǐnYuán). In classical Chinese, the word "隐" means "hermit". According to a professional book collector, Chenjian, in Taicang, this park had been a private park in the Yuan dynasty. A hermit, Qun Xiaozhen (瞿孝祯), built the park and treated it as his own study. The park has now been rebuilt on the old site. In 1982, it was officially renamed "乐荫园".

==== View ====
Inside the park, most of the constructions are built beside the water. Rockery mountains, greenwoods, bamboo groves and lawns are here and there. The park is about 22.5 acres and the region of water covers an area of 5 acres. Across the main water, there is a lotus leaf bridge.

=== Olive Island ===
In Shaxi, there is another scenic spot, a small island called Olive Island in the south. The name derives from the view seen from the sky: it is similar to an olive. The island is 1,350 meters long and covers an area of 13,500 square meters.

==== View ====
On the island, there is a well-known bridge named "Five-Dragon Bridge" (Chinese: 五龙桥; pinyin: Wǔlóngqiáo). The bridge also has a magic legend. It is said that in the past, residents held a grand Dragon Boat Competition. The God was touched by the people's spirit so he sent five dragons to the human's world to support this event. In order to commemorate the honour, the bridge was constructed. There are many old pavilions inside the island such as "listening tide pavilion" (听潮亭). Another famous pavilion is called "Green Bamboo Pavilion" (晚翠亭). Beside the pavilion, many green bamboo shoots have been planted as well as various plants and flowers.

== Famous people ==
Many celebrities were born in Shaxi, influenced by its unique environment.

NAME	TIMES	POSITION
Wu Xiaobang (吴晓邦)	Early Republic of China	Founder of China's new dance
Lu Jingshi (陆京士)	The Republic of China	Former mayor in Taipei
Sang Yue (桑月)		Historian
Tang Wenzhi (唐文治)	Modern history	Educator
Gong Shumo (龚树模)		Astrologer
Gong Jiong (龚炯)		Children's literature
Gu Atao (顾阿桃)		Figure of the Cultural Revolution

== Specialties ==
=== Rou (扣肉) ===
Rou is one of Shaxi's three treasures. It can be found in both small and large restaurants. Cooking a real Rou is a long process with many steps. The most important thing is to pick a suitable pork. Many traditional flavours are added along with oil.

=== Salty pig bone porridge (古法咸猪骨粥) ===
Salty pig bone porridge is another special dish in Shaxi. The porridge is sweet and warm, fragrant and catchy. It is known for increasing one's beauty, and is said to be popular among women. This dish contains a moderate amount of pig bones, red dates, preserved duck, egg yolk, fruit peelings, ginger, chopped spring onions, salt, chicken and a rice wine.
