= Jincang Lake =

- Artificial recreational wetland park
- 金仓湖
- Country: People's Republic of China
- Province: Jiangsu
- Prefecture-level city: Suzhou
- County-level city: Taicang

Area
  - Total: 6 km^{2} (2.3 sq mi)
- Website: http://www.tccx.gov.cn/

Jincang Lake (Chinese: 金仓湖; pinyin: Jīncānghú) is an artificial wetland park; completed in 2008, located in Taicang, Suzhou, China.

== Background of the project ==
In 2003, the government invested in constructing a new highway connecting Suzhou, Kunshan and Taicang. The soil was mainly taken from the village of Donglin in Taicang, leaving a relatively large space that the government decided to transform into Jincang Lake.

The project commenced in November 2007. After about ten months of hard work, in early October 2008, the project was finished and Jincang Lake (and its surrounding park) was opened for use to residents of Taicang.

== Events ==
Many organizers have chosen to use the park to hold festivals, competitions, and other large events since it was first opened to the public. Below, several notable events that have been held at the park are listed.

Year	Event
2009	Taicang International Bicycle Carnival Competition
2010	Bicycle Carnival Competition
2011	Jincang Lake Cooling Culture Festival
2011	Jincang Lake Tent Festival
2011	Taicang Tourist Culture Festival

== Attractions ==
Inside Jincang Lake, there are several areas unique in their features for tourists to enjoy.

=== Barefoot Forest Park ===
One area is the Barefoot Forest Park (Chinese: 赤足森林; pinyin: Chìzúsēnlín). The concept originates in Germany, where it was first established to allow local residents to "get closer to nature and walk barefoot to feel nature's existence". In Taicang, there is a large presence of German companies and German nationals operating and living within the city. In order to provide a leisure place for both foreign and local people, the government decided to build this barefoot forest park as an homage to those that exist in Germany.
