= Tomohiro Noda =

Japanese racewalker

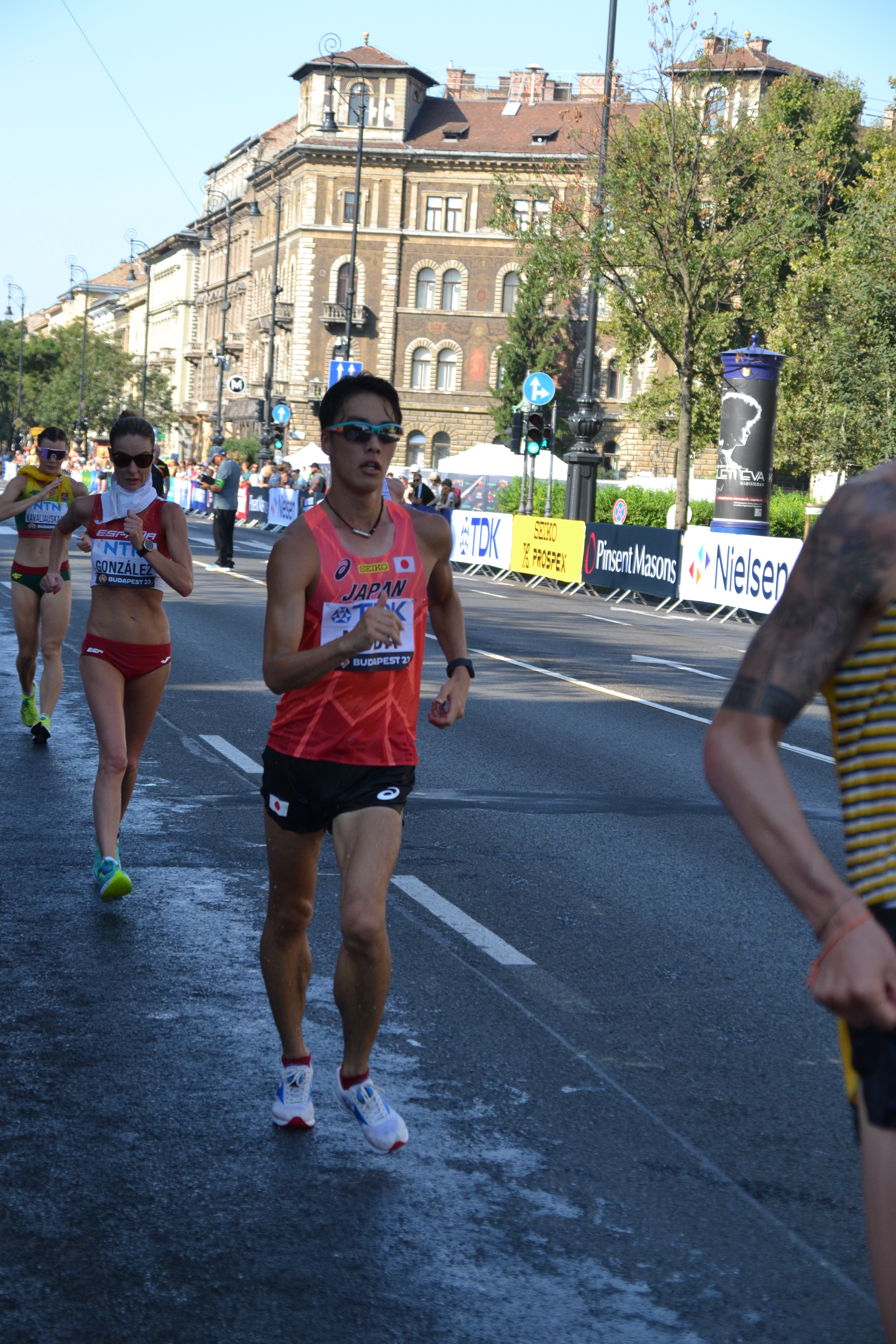

Personal information
- Born: 24 January 1996 (age 29)

Sport
- Country: Japan
- Sport: Racewalking

Tomohiro Noda (野田 明宏, Noda Tomohiro; born 24 January 1996) is a Japanese racewalker. In 2019, he competed in the men's 50 kilometres walk at the 2019 World Athletics Championships held in Doha, Qatar. He did not finish his race.

In 2015, he competed in the men's 20 kilometres walk at the 2015 Summer Universiade held in Gwangju, South Korea. He finished in 8th place.

In 2017, he competed in the men's 20 kilometres walk at the 2017 Summer Universiade held in Taipei, Taiwan. He finished in 7th place.
