= Athletics at the 2017 Summer Universiade – Men's 20 kilometres walk =

The men's 20 kilometres walk event at the 2017 Summer Universiade was held on 26 August on Ren'ai Road, Taipei City.

== Medalists ==
=== Individual ===
Gold	Silver	Bronze
Toshikazu Yamanishi; Japan	Julio César Salazar; Mexico	Fumitaka Oikawa; Japan

=== Team ===
Gold	Silver	Bronze
Japan; Toshikazu Yamanishi; Fumitaka Oikawa; Tomohiro Noda	Mexico; Julio César Salazar; Ever Palma; Isaac Palma	Ukraine; Igor Glavan; Valeriy Litanyuk; Ivan Banzeruk; Andriy Hrechkovskiy

== Results ==
=== Individual ===
Rank	Name	Nationality	Time	Penalties	Notes
1st place, gold medalist(s)	Toshikazu Yamanishi	Japan	1:27:30		
2nd place, silver medalist(s)	Julio César Salazar	Mexico	1:28:20	~	
3rd place, bronze medalist(s)	Fumitaka Oikawa	Japan	1:30:11	~~	
4	Ever Palma	Mexico	1:30:23	~>	
5	Isaac Palma	Mexico	1:30:31	~>	
6	Igor Glavan	Ukraine	1:30:39	~	
7	Tomohiro Noda	Japan	1:31:00	~>	
8	Georgiy Sheiko	Kazakhstan	1:32:58	~	
9	Choe Byeong-kwang	South Korea	1:33:08	~~	
10	Valeriy Litanyuk	Ukraine	1:34:12	>>	
11	Joo Hyun-myeong	South Korea	1:34:28		
12	Kang Kil-dong	South Korea	1:34:49		
13	Cian McManamon	Ireland	1:35:06	~	
14	Dominik Černý	Slovakia	1:36:10	>	
15	Ivan Banzeruk	Ukraine	1:36:43	>	
16	Gabriel Bordier	France	1:38:38	>	
17	Bence Venyercsán	Hungary	1:39:48	>	
18	Zhao Fujian	China	1:40:14	~~	
19	Andriy Hrechkovskiy	Ukraine	1:40:15	>>	
20	Han Jijiang	China	1:40:56	>	
21	Yan Dexiang	China	1:46:30	>	
	Miroslav Úradník	Slovakia	DNF		
	Marius Šavelskis	Lithuania	DQ	~>>	

Penalties
~ Lost contact
> Bent knee

=== Team ===
Rank	Team	Time	Notes
1st place, gold medalist(s)	Japan	4:28:41	
2nd place, silver medalist(s)	Mexico	4:29:14	
3rd place, bronze medalist(s)	Ukraine	4:41:34	
4	South Korea	4:42:25	
5	China	5:07:40	
