= Olena Sobchuk =

Ukrainian racewalker (born 1995)

Personal information
- Nationality: Ukrainian
- Born: 23 November 1995 (age 29)

Sport
- Sport: Athletics
- Event: Race walking

Olena Sobchuk-Mizernyuk (born 23 November 1995) is a Ukrainian racewalking athlete. Representing Ukraine at the 2019 World Athletics Championships, she placed fourth in the women's 50 kilometres walk.

She competed in the women's 20 kilometres walk at the 2022 World Athletics Championships held in Eugene, Oregon, United States.
