= Meryem Bekmez =

Turkish race walker (born 2000)

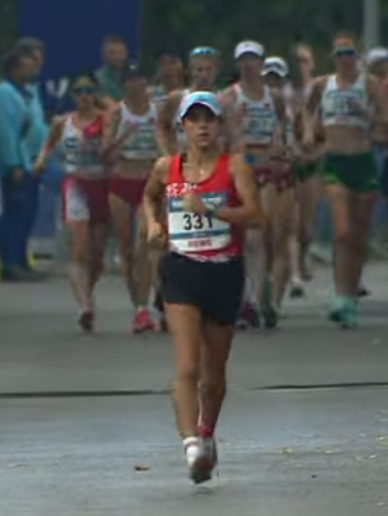
- At the 2025 Summer World University Games

Personal information
- Born: 31 July 2000 (age 26) Diyarbakır, Turkey

Sport
- Sport: Race walk
- Club: Enka SK
Medal record
Women's athletics
Representing Turkey
World Race Walking Team Championships
Bronze medal – third place	2018 Taicang	10 km race walk (team)
World U20 Championships
Silver medal – second place	2018 Tampere	10,000 m race walk
European U20 Championships
Gold medal – first place	2019 Borås	10,000 m race walk
Bronze medal – third place	2017 Grosseto	10,000 m race walk
European Race Walking Cup
Gold medal – first place	2019 Alytus	10 km race walk (U20)
World U18 Championships
Silver medal – second place	2017 Nairobi	5,000 m race walk
European U18 Championships
Gold medal – first place	2016 Tbilisi	5,000 m race walk
Summer World University Games
Gold medal – first place	2021 Chengdu	20 km walk

Meryem Bekmez (born 31 July 2000) is a Turkish race walker specialising in the 5000 metres and 10,000 metres. She is a native of Diyarbakır, Turkey. She was a member of the municipality-owned club of Kayapınar, before she was transferred by Enka SK in Istanbul.

== Early life ==
Meryem Bekmez was born in Şilbe neighborhood of Yenişehir district of Diyarbakır, southeastern Turkey on 31 July 2000. In 2013, she was discovered for athletics by Çetin Aslan, a coach of the Turkish Athletic Federation when he visited her school. She was a seventh-grade student in the middle school.

Her father Hacı Bekmez told in an interview that "she would have been married off like her sister, or would be working on the field, had she not been discovered". Born and raised in a region where the practice of child marriage for girls is common, she escaped the traditional social pressure thanks to athletics, as she has emphasized.

== Sports career ==
Bekmez placed first in the 3 km event at an intra-school running competition at provincial level. The same year, she ranked first in a nationwide competition. Following her success in provincial and then in regional events, she was allowed to participate at the Turkish championships.

After she came runner-up in the 2014 Turkish Championships, she was admitted to the national team's preparation camp. In 2015, she became Turkish champion. Her international debut came at the Balkan Athletics Championships in 2016, where she became champion.

In 2016, Bekmez became champion in the 5,000m race walk event at the 2016 European Athletics Youth Championships in Tbilisi, Georgia, and broke the 12-year national record.

She competed in the 5,000m race walk at the 2017 World U18 Championships winning a silver medal. She also competed in the 10,000m race walk at the 2017 European U20 Championships winning a bronze medal.

Bekmez and her teammate Ayşe Tekdal of the Turkey national race walking team won the bronze medal at the 2018 IAAF World Race Walking Team Championships in Taicang, China. At the 2018 IAAF World U20 Championships in Tampere, Finland, she took the silver medal, and broke national records in junior and senior women's category with a time of 44:17.69. She set a national record and became World U20 leader in the 20 km walk event of the 2018 European Athletics Championships in Berlin, Germany although she placed only 11th.

During the first leg of the Turkish Race Walk League held in Konya in April 2019, she set a national record in the 5,000m event of women's U20 category with her time of 21:54. She won the gold medal in juniors (U20) category of the 2019 European Race Walking Cup#Women's 10 km (U20) in Alytus, Lithuania. At the 2019 European Athletics U20 Championships held in Borås, Sweden, she captured the gold medal in the 10,000m race walk event.

Bekmez competed in the women's 20 km walk at the 2020 Summer Olympics in Tokyo, finishing 21st in 1:35:08. In early 2021 she set new personal bests across several distances within a few months of each other, walking 21:05.56 for 5000 metres on 17 January, 43:23 for 10 km on 6 March and 1:28:48 for 20 km on 27 March, all Turkish records. She won the gold medal in the women's 20 km walk at the 2021 Summer World University Games, held in Chengdu, China in 2023 after a COVID-19-related postponement, finishing in 1:33:53 ahead of the Czech Republic's Eliška Martínková.

She further improved her 10,000 m track walk national record to 44:11.12 on 10 June 2023. Bekmez returned to the Olympics at the 2024 Summer Olympics in Paris, competing in the women's 20 km walk. She went on to compete for Turkey at the 2025 Summer World University Games in the Rhine-Ruhr region of Germany.

== Competition record ==
Year	Competition	Venue	Position	Event	Time	Notes
Representing Turkey
2016	Balkan Athletics Championships	Pitești, Romania	1st	5,000 m race walk	22.53	
2016	European U18 Championships	Tbilisi, Georgia	1st	5,000 m race walk	22:50.22 NR	
2017	World U18 Championships	Nairobi, Kenya	2nd	5,000 m race walk	22:32.79	
2017	European U20 Championships	Grosseto, Italy	3rd	10,000 m race walk	48:33.88	
2018	World Race Walking Team Championships	Taicang, China	3rd	10 km race walk (team)	25 pts	
2018	World U20 Championship	Tampere, Finland	2nd	10,000 m race walk	44:17.69 NR	
2018	European Championships	Berlin, Germany	11th	20 km race walk	1:31:00 WU20L, NR	
2019	European Race Walking Cup	Alytus, Lithuania	1st	10 km race walk (U20)	45:37	
2019	European U20 Championships	Borås, Sweden	1st	10,000 m race walk	44:44.50	
2021	Olympic Games	Tokyo, Japan	21st	20 km race walk	1:35:08	
2023	Summer World University Games	Chengdu, China	1st	20 km walk	1:33:53	
2024	Olympic Games	Paris, France		20 km race walk		
2025	Summer World University Games	Rhine-Ruhr, Germany		20 km walk		

- NR: National record
- WU20L: World U20 leading
