= ABA Chemicals =

Chinese chemical manufacturing company

ABA Chemical Corporation
- Native name: 雅本化学
- Formerly: Suzhou ABA Chemicals Co. Ltd
- Company type: Public
- Traded as: SZSE: 300261 ABACHEM
- Industry: Chemicals
- Founded: 2006; 19 years ago
- Headquarters: Taicang, Suzhou, Jiangsu, China
- Number of locations: 6 facilities (2017)
- Key people: Cai Tong (Chairman/President); Mao Haifeng (Vice President); Ma Lifan (Vice President)
- Number of employees: 1,073
- Website: abachem.com/cn/index.html
- Footnotes / references Key people, Traded as

ABA Chemicals, also known as Abachem, is a Chinese chemical manufacturing company headquartered in Taicang. The company was founded in 2006 as Suzhou ABA Chemicals, and is traded on the Shenzhen Stock Exchange as 300261.

The company provides contract development and manufacturing services to the pharmaceutical, biotechnological, and agrochemical industries. It offers various services for the production of fine chemicals; intermediates; and active pharmaceutical ingredients. The company also provides unnatural amino acids, pyrazoles, triazoles, and azaindoles, as well as producing an intermediate of API Levetiracetam for the treatment of epilepsy.

The company is also involved in pesticide manufacturing intermediates, and acquired the Chinese firm Shanghai Puyi Chemical to consolidate its position in this market. It also acquired Amino Chemicals, a pharmaceutical API intermediate manufacturer and member of the Dipharma Group, in 2017; Amino is based on Malta and was established in 1992. ABA and Dipharma began a working partnership in the 1980s, which provided Dipharma access to the Chinese pharmaceutical market.

As of 2017, ABA had six facilities, three manufacturing facilities in Jiangsu Province and three research and development facilities in Shanghai. The manufacturing facility in Taicang was ISO 9001, ISO 14001 and OHSAS 18001 certified as of 2016.
