= Liang Rui =

Chinese racewalker (born 1994)

Personal information
- Nationality: Chinese
- Born: 18 June 1994 (age 32) Min County, China
- Education: Beijing Sport University
- Height: 1.60 m (5 ft 3 in)
- Weight: 50 kg (110 lb)

Sport
- Country: China
- Sport: Athletics
- Event: Racewalking
Medal record
World Championships
Gold medal – first place	2019 Doha	50 km walk
World Race Walking Team Championships
Gold medal – first place	2018 Taicang	50 km walk
Gold medal – first place	2018 Taicang	Team

Liang Rui (Chinese: 梁瑞; born 18 June 1994) is a female Chinese racewalking athlete who competes in the 20 kilometres and 50 kilometres race walk. She was the world record holder for the 50 km walk event and was a gold medalist at the 2018 IAAF World Race Walking Team Championships. In 2019 her record was beaten by Hong Liu with a time of 3:59:15. In the same year, she finished outside the top ten in the IAAF Challenge races in Taicang and La Coruña, and was seventh in a national 50 km meeting.

Liang competed nationally as a youth and placed third at the Chinese Universities Championships over 5000 m and 10,000 m distances in 2014. She had her breakthrough at senior level in 2016 with a victory over the 20 km walk at the Asian Race Walking Championships, seeing off challenges from Kumiko Okada and Lee Jeong-eun. Her winning margin was over one minute and 1:28:43 hours was a lifetime best for the distance. She competed in Chinese races only in the 2017 season, with highlights including a fourth-place finish at the Taicang leg of the IAAF Race Walking Challenge.

She made her debut over 50 km at the 2018 IAAF World Race Walking Team Championships and it proved to be a highly successful move as she won the gold medal in a world record time of 4:04:36 hours, taking over one minute off the previous record set by Inês Henriques. This made her the inaugural 50 km champion in the newly recognised women's event, and she led the Chinese team of Yin Hang and Ma Faying to the first team championship also. Later that year she won the 50 km title at the Chinese Autumn Race Walking Championships.

== International competitions ==
Year	Competition	Venue	Position	Event	Notes
2016	Asian Race Walking Championships	Nomi, Japan	1st	20 km walk	1:28:43
2018	World Race Walking Team Championships	Taicang, China	1st	50 km walk	4:04:36
2018	World Race Walking Team Championships	Taicang, China	1st	Team	8 pts

== National titles ==
Chinese Autumn Race Walking Championships

- 50 km walk: 2018

Records
Preceded by Inês Henriques	Women's 50 km walk world record holder 5 May 2018 – present	Incumbent
