= Valeriy Litanyuk =

Ukrainian racewalker (born 1994)

Personal information
- Born: 2 April 1994 (age 32)

Sport
- Country: Ukraine
- Sport: Racewalking

Valeriy Bohdanovych Litanyuk (Ukrainian: Валерій Богданович Літанюк; born 2 April 1994) is a Ukrainian racewalker. In 2019, he competed in the men's 50 kilometres walk at the 2019 World Athletics Championships held in Doha, Qatar. He finished in 25th place.

In 2017, he competed in the men's 20 kilometres walk at the 2017 Summer Universiade held in Taipei, Taiwan. He finished in 10th place. In 2018, he competed in the men's 50 kilometres walk at the 2018 European Athletics Championships held in Berlin, Germany. He finished in 18th place.

== Achievements ==
- Silver medal in the team 50 km event at the 2018 IAAF World Race Walking Team Championships.
- Bronze medal in the team 20 km event at the 2017 Summer Universiade.
- Gold medal in the team 50 km event at the 2019 European Race Walking Cup.
- Bronze medal in the team 50 km event at the 2021 European Race Walking Team Championships.
- Winner of the Ukrainian championship in the 35 km race walk (2018).
- Medalist at the Ukrainian Athletics Championships in race walking events.
