= Women's 50 kilometres walk world record progression =

The following table shows the world record progression in the women's 50 kilometres walk, as recognised by the IAAF.

Unlike the men's 50K walk, the women's 50K walk is a new event, having been added to the IAAF World Athletics Championships for the first time in 2017.

== World record progression ==
Time	Athlete	Date	Place	Ref.
4:08:26	Inês Henriques (POR)	15 January 2017	Porto de Mós	
4:05:56	Inês Henriques (POR)	13 August 2017	London	
4:04:36	Liang Rui (CHN)	5 May 2018	Taicang	
3:59:15	Liu Hong (CHN)	9 March 2019	Huangshan	

== See also ==
- Men's 50 kilometres walk world record progression
