= Yuxia Shi =

Chinese racewalker (born 1999)

Personal information
- Born: 28 January 1999 (age 27) China

Sport
- Country: China
- Sport: Athletics
- Event: Race walking

Yuxia Shi (born 28 January 1999) is a Chinese racewalker.

== Career ==
Shi set a personal best of 22:06 for the 5,000 metres walk on 21 April 2016, and a 10 km personal best of 44:28 on 4 September 2017.

She competed in the women's 10,000 metres walk at the 2018 IAAF World U20 Championships in Tampere, Finland, finishing sixth on 14 July 2018 with a time of 45:21.39, which remained her personal best for the distance as of 2026.

Shi subsequently moved into road racewalking events at senior level. On 1 March 2025, at the Chinese Race Walking Grand Prix in Taicang, a World Athletics Race Walking Tour Gold meeting, she finished third in the women's 20 km walk in a personal best time of 1:27:41, behind winner Jemima Montag of Australia and China's Ma Li, who finished second. She set a personal best of 1:35:33 for the half marathon walk on 1 March 2026.
