= Ayşe Tekdal =

Turkish race walker

Personal information
- Born: 28 October 1999 (age 26) Diyarbakır, Turkey

Sport
- Sport: Race walk
- Club: Enka SK
Medal record
Women's athletics
Representing Turkey
World Race Walking Team Championships
Bronze medal – third place	2018 Taicang	10 km race walk (team)
Balkan Race Walking Championship
Gold medal – first place	2021 Antalya	20 km race walk
European U23 Championships
Gold medal – first place	2019 Gävle	20 km race walk
European U18 Championships
Silver medal – second place	2016 Tbilisi	5,000 m race walk

Ayşe Tekdal (born 28 October 1999) is a Turkish female race walker specialising in the 5000 m, 10,000 m and 20 km events. She is a native of Diyarbakır, southeastern Turkey. She competes for Kayapınar Belediyespor in her hometown.

== Sports career ==
Tekdal won the silver nedal in the 5,000 m event at the 2016 European Athletics Youth Championships held in Tbilisi, Georgia with a personal best time of 22:58.17 behind her countrywoman Meryem Bekmez. At the 2018 IAAF World Race Walking Team Championships in Taicang, China, she took the bronze medal in the 10 km race walk event with her teammate Bekmez. In 2019, she captured the gold medal in the 20 km race walk event of the European Athletics U23 Championships held in Gävle, Sweden. In 2019, she competed in the women's 20 kilometres walk event at the 2019 World Athletics Championships held in Doha, Qatar. She was disqualified after a fourth red card. In She set a new Turkish U23 and seniors record with 21:00.97 in the indoor 5,000 m race walking event at the Turkish Indoor Race Walking Championship on 17 January 2021. Former senior women's record was held by Meryem Bekmez with 21:54.25 set in 2018, and the women's U23 record was of Nergis Adaş.

In 2021, she won the gold medal at the Balkan Race Walk Championship in Antalya, Turkey with a time of 1:30:12, which brought her the participation at the 2020 Summer Olympics. She became the first Balkan champion Turkish woman race walker.

== Competition record ==
Year	Competition	Venue	Position	Event	Time	Notes
Representing Turkey
2016	European U18 Championships	Tbilisi, Georgia	2nd	5,000 m race walk	22:58.17 PB	
2018	World Race Walking Team Championships	Taicang, China	3rd	10 km race walk (team)	25 pts	
2019	European U23 Championships	Gävle, Sweden	1st	20 km race walk	1:34:47	
2021	20th Balkan Race Walking Championship	Antalya, Turkey	1st	20 km race walk	1:30:12	

- PB: Personal best
