= Li Maocuo =

Chinese racewalker (born 1992)

Personal information
- Nationality: Chinese
- Born: 20 October 1992 (age 33)

Sport
- Country: China
- Sport: Athletics
- Event: Racewalking
Medal record
Women's athletics
Representing China
World Championships
| Silver medal – second place | 2019 Doha | 50 km walk |

Li Maocuo (born 20 October 1992) is a Chinese racewalking athlete. Representing China at the 2019 World Athletics Championships, she won a silver medal in the women's 50 kilometres walk.
