= Mara Ribeiro =

Portuguese racewalker

Personal information
- Born: 11 May 1995 (age 31)

Sport
- Country: Portugal
- Sport: Racewalking

Mara Ribeiro (born 11 May 1995) is a Portuguese racewalker. In 2019, she competed in the women's 50 kilometres walk at the 2019 World Athletics Championships held in Doha, Qatar. She finished in 15th place.
