= Valentyna Nayavka =

Ukrainian racewalker

Personal information
- Born: 10 August 1994 (age 31)

Sport
- Sport: Track and field
- Event: 20 kilometres race walk

Valentyna Nayavka (née Myronchuk, 10 August 1994) is a Ukrainian race walker. She competed in the women's 20 kilometres walk event at the 2016 Summer Olympics. In 2019, she competed in the women's 50 kilometres walk at the 2019 World Athletics Championships held in Doha, Qatar. She did not finish her race.
