= Ma Faying =

Chinese racewalker

Personal information
- Nationality: Chinese
- Born: 30 August 1993 (age 32)

Sport
- Sport: Athletics
- Event: Race walking

Ma Faying (born 30 August 1993) is a Chinese racewalking athlete. Representing China at the 2019 World Athletics Championships, she placed fifth in the women's 50 kilometres walk.
