= Inês Henriques =

Portuguese race walker (born 1980)

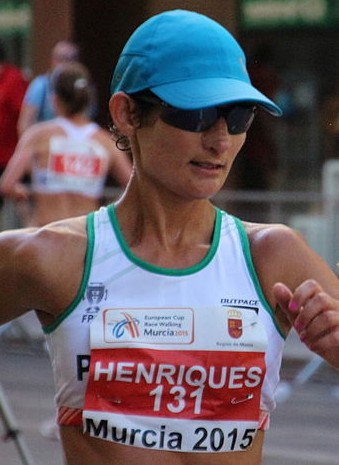
- Henriques in 2015

Personal information
- Born: 1 May 1980 (age 46) Santarém, Portugal
- Height: 1.56 m (5 ft 1 in)
- Weight: 46 kg (101 lb)

Sport
- Country: Portugal
- Sport: Athletics
- Events: 20km Race Walk; 50km Race Walk
Medal record
World Championships
Gold medal – first place	2017 London	50 km walk
European Championships
Gold medal – first place	2018 Berlin	50 km walk

Inês Henriques (born 1 May 1980) is a Portuguese race walker. Internationally, she has won bronze medals at the 2010 IAAF World Race Walking Cup and the 2010 Ibero-American Championships in Athletics. She represented Portugal at the 2004 Summer Olympics and the 2012 Summer Olympics and has competed at the World Championships in Athletics on eight occasions from 2001 to 2017.

She won at the Chihuahua City meeting of the 2012 IAAF World Race Walking Challenge in March.

In 2017, in London, she won the gold medal in the 50km walk event, held for the first time during the World Championships in Athletics. With her time of 4:05:56, she also set the world record for the event.

== International competitions ==
Year	Competition	Venue	Position	Event	Notes
Representing Portugal
1996	World Junior Championships	Sydney, Australia	22nd	5000 m	25:17.22
1998	World Junior Championships	Annecy, France	24th	5000 m	23:54.51
2000	European Race Walking Cup	Eisenhüttenstadt, Germany	42nd	20 km	1:41:19
2001	European Race Walking Cup	Dudince, Slovakia	25th	20 km	1:36:08
2001	European U23 Championships	Amsterdam, Netherlands	10th	20 km	1:34:49
2001	World Championships	Edmonton, Canada	—	20 km	DQ
2002	European Championships	Munich, Germany	15th	20 km	1:35:07
2002	World Race Walking Cup	Turin, Italy	23rd	20 km	1:35:28
2004	World Race Walking Cup	Naumburg, Germany	34th	20 km	1:32:32
2004	Olympic Games	Athens, Greece	25th	20 km	1:33:53
2005	European Race Walking Cup	Miskolc, Hungary	17th	20 km	1:35:12
2005	European Race Walking Cup	Miskolc, Hungary	1st	Team - 20 km	25 pts
2005	World Championships	Helsinki, Finland	27th	20 km	1:35:44
2006	European Championships	Gothenburg, Sweden	12th	20 km	1:31:58
2006	World Race Walking Cup	A Coruña, Spain	13th	20 km	1:30:28
2007	World Championships	Osaka, Japan	7th	20 km	1:33:06
2008	World Race Walking Cup	Cheboksary, Russia	19th	20 km	1:32:35
2009	European Race Walking Cup	Metz, France	—	20 km	DQ
2009	World Championships	Berlin, Germany	11th	20 km	1:32:51
2010	World Race Walking Cup	Chihuahua, Mexico	3rd	20 km	1:33:28
2010	Ibero-American Championships	San Fernando, Spain	3rd	10,000 m	44:31.27
2010	European Championships	Barcelona, Spain	9th	20 km	1:32:26
2011	European Race Walking Cup	Olhão, Portugal	13th	20 km	1:34:11
2011	World Championships	Daegu, South Korea	10th	20 km	1:32:06
2012	World Race Walking Cup	Saransk, Russia	10th	20 km	1:31:43
2012	Olympic Games	London, United Kingdom	15th	20 km	1:29:54
2013	European Race Walking Cup	Dudince, Slovakia	8th	20 km	1:32:39
2013	European Race Walking Cup	Dudince, Slovakia	2nd	Team - 20 km	23 pts
2013	World Championships	Moscow, Russia	11th	20 km	1:30:28
2014	World Race Walking Cup	Taicang, China	22nd	20 km	1:29:33
2015	European Race Walking Cup	Murcia, Spain	16th	20 km	1:30:44
2015	European Race Walking Cup	Murcia, Spain	3rd	Team - 20 km	38 pts
2015	World Championships	Beijing, China	23rd	20 km	1:34:47
2017	World Championships	London, United Kingdom	1st	50 km	4:05:56
2018	World Race Walking Team Championships	Taicang, China	—	50 km	DNF
2018	European Championships	Berlin, Germany	1st	50 km	4:09:21

== Awards ==
Year	Award	Category	Result
2018	Golden Globes (Portugal)	Best Female Athlete	Won

Records
New title	Women's 50 km walk world record holder 15 January 2017 – 5 May 2018	Succeeded by Liang Rui
