= Taicang =

Taicang 太仓市
- County-level city
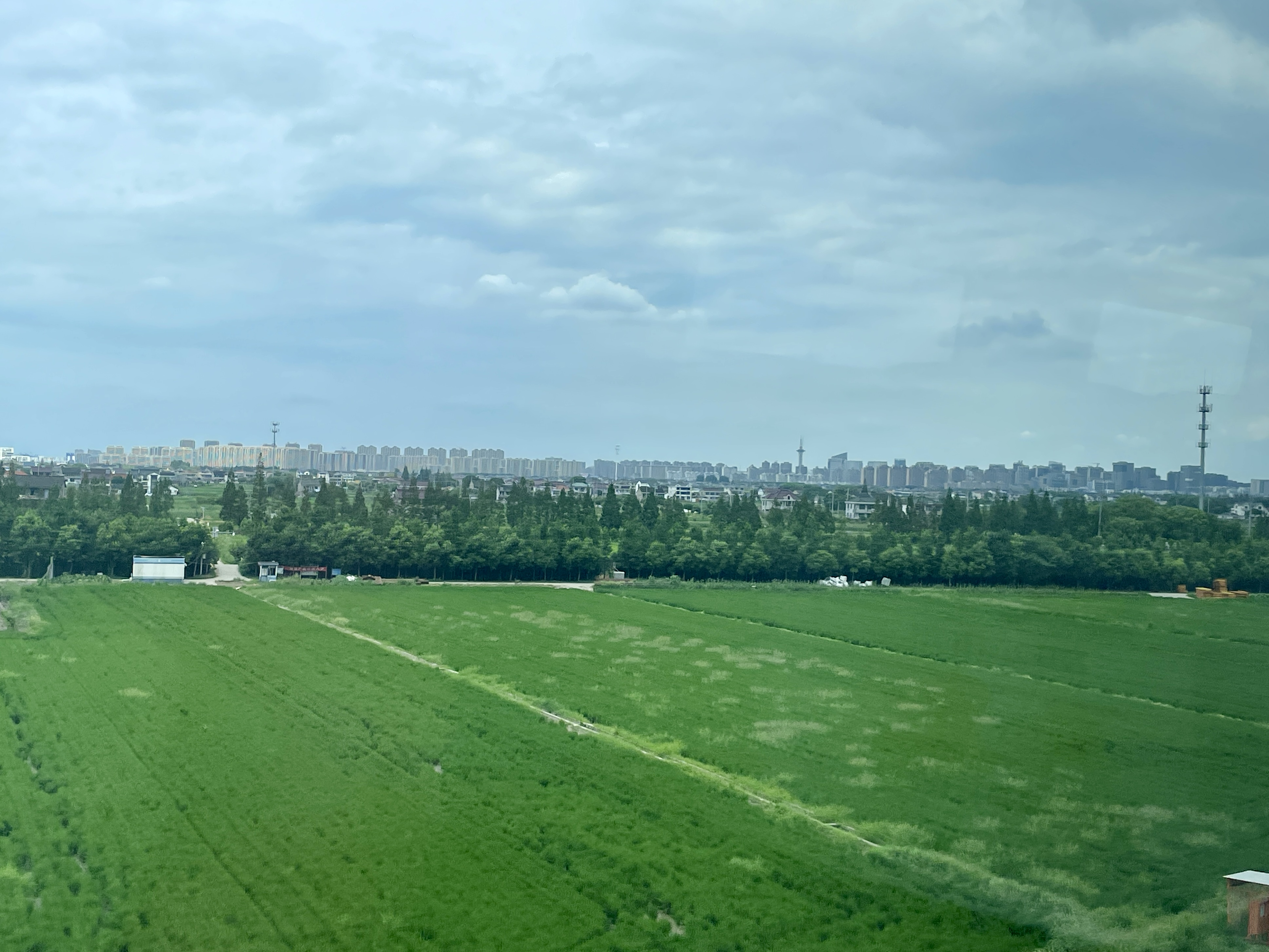
- Skyline of Taicang

- Location in Jiangsu
- Coordinates: 31°33′50″N 121°10′26″E
- Country: People's Republic of China
- Province: Jiangsu
- Prefecture-level city: Suzhou
- Municipal seat: Chengxiang

Area
  - County-level city: 794 km^{2} (307 sq mi)
  - Land: 620 km^{2} (240 sq mi)
  - Water: 174 km^{2} (67 sq mi)

Population (2020 census)
  - County-level city: 831,113
  - Density: 1,300/km^{2} (3,500/sq mi)
  - Urban: 586,830
  - Rural: 244,283
- Time zone: UTC+8 (China Standard)
- Postal code: 215400—215434
- Area code: 0512

Taicang
- Simplified Chinese: 太仓市
- Traditional Chinese: 太倉市
- Postal: Taitsang
- Literal meaning: Lake Tai granary city
Transcriptions
Standard Mandarin
- Hanyu Pinyin: Tàicāng shì
- Wade–Giles: T'ai^{4}-ts'ang^{1} shih^{4}
- IPA: [tʰâɪtsʰáŋ ʂî]

Taicang is a county-level city under the jurisdiction of Suzhou, Jiangsu province, China. The city located in the south of the Yangtze River estuary opposite Nantong, being bordered by Shanghai proper to the south, while the river also delineates much of its northeastern boundary along Chongming Island.

== Administration ==
Taicang administers 7 towns:

- Chengxiang (城厢镇)
- Shaxi (沙溪镇)
- Ludu (陆渡镇)
- Liuhe (浏河镇)
- Fuqiao (浮桥镇)
- Huangjing (璜泾镇)
- Shuangfeng (双凤镇)

== History ==
=== Toponym ===
Taicang as a place name is mentioned in a memorial to the throne of geographer Jia Dan during the Song dynasty, "Where lies to the east of Kunshan nowadays", he supposedly wrote, "is called Taicang, also known as Gangshen".

=== Overview ===
Taicang is a natural port. Under the Yuan, the city reached its peak between 1271 and 1368. Under the Ming, Taicang's Liuhe Harbor was the departure point for Zheng He's treasure fleets. It was also during this period that the shoals in the Yangtze estuary which later became Chongming Island were placed under the supervision of Taicang Prefecture.

It was the venue for the 2014 IAAF World Race Walking Cup.

== Geography ==
The Taicang port is in the east of the city, and south of the Yangtze exit into the East China Sea. The center of the Taicang port is on 31°37′00" North, 121°14′00" East. The port line stretches 24.3 miles (38.8 km), of which 15.6 miles can park 50 thousand ton vessels. Taicang is in a humid subtropical climate zone with distinctive seasons. The average year round temperature is 15.5 Celsius. Precipitation is around 1078.1 mm.

== Climate ==
Climate data for Taicang, elevation 6 m (20 ft), (1991–2020 normals, extremes 1981–present)
Month	Jan	Feb	Mar	Apr	May	Jun	Jul	Aug	Sep	Oct	Nov	Dec	Year
Record high °C (°F)	21.3 (70.3)	26.3 (79.3)	33.4 (92.1)	33.8 (92.8)	35.6 (96.1)	37.4 (99.3)	38.7 (101.7)	39.0 (102.2)	37.4 (99.3)	32.9 (91.2)	28.4 (83.1)	22.5 (72.5)	39.0 (102.2)
Mean daily maximum °C (°F)	7.9 (46.2)	10.1 (50.2)	14.4 (57.9)	20.4 (68.7)	25.6 (78.1)	28.3 (82.9)	32.6 (90.7)	32.1 (89.8)	28.1 (82.6)	23.0 (73.4)	17.3 (63.1)	10.7 (51.3)	20.9 (69.6)
Daily mean °C (°F)	4.1 (39.4)	5.9 (42.6)	10.0 (50.0)	15.5 (59.9)	20.9 (69.6)	24.4 (75.9)	28.7 (83.7)	28.2 (82.8)	24.1 (75.4)	18.7 (65.7)	12.9 (55.2)	6.5 (43.7)	16.7 (62.0)
Mean daily minimum °C (°F)	1.1 (34.0)	2.6 (36.7)	6.3 (43.3)	11.5 (52.7)	16.9 (62.4)	21.3 (70.3)	25.5 (77.9)	25.3 (77.5)	21.0 (69.8)	15.1 (59.2)	9.3 (48.7)	3.2 (37.8)	13.3 (55.9)
Record low °C (°F)	−8.5 (16.7)	−6.5 (20.3)	−3.5 (25.7)	−0.4 (31.3)	7.6 (45.7)	12.5 (54.5)	18.2 (64.8)	16.4 (61.5)	11.4 (52.5)	2.7 (36.9)	−2.4 (27.7)	−8.6 (16.5)	−8.6 (16.5)
Average precipitation mm (inches)	66.5 (2.62)	61.6 (2.43)	84.5 (3.33)	79.5 (3.13)	90.4 (3.56)	210.5 (8.29)	161.0 (6.34)	201.9 (7.95)	105.3 (4.15)	62.0 (2.44)	58.5 (2.30)	44.7 (1.76)	1,226.4 (48.3)
Average precipitation days (≥ 0.1 mm)	10.4	10.0	12.0	10.8	11.0	14.1	12.1	12.8	9.0	7.5	8.7	8.4	126.8
Average snowy days	3.1	2.1	0.6	0	0	0	0	0	0	0	0.1	0.9	6.8
Average relative humidity (%)	77	76	74	72	73	80	78	80	80	77	77	75	77
Mean monthly sunshine hours	117.2	123.3	147.5	169.3	180.7	135.1	203.0	208.0	176.0	170.5	137.9	136.1	1,904.6
Percentage possible sunshine	37	39	40	43	42	32	47	51	48	49	44	44	43
Source: China Meteorological Administration

== Economy ==
Taicang is known for having operations from companies established by Germans since 1985, when the first German businessperson went to Taicang. Accordingly, the city obtained the nickname "Little Swabia" with it having German-inspired businesses. The area does not have a significant German population as the German immigrants prefer Shanghai since it contains the German School of Shanghai. The city has the German Centre for Industry and Trade Taicang (Chinese: 太仓德国中心).

Walking through Nanyang square, in Taicang.

ABA Chemicals, a chemicals manufacturing company, is headquartered in Taicang.

By 2021 the city had a labor shortage with workers demanding higher wages.

== Notable people ==
- Chien-Shiung Wu, Chinese-American physicist who built the atomic bomb in the Manhattan Project and disproved the conservation of parity

== See also ==
- Jincang Lake, Taicang
- Adventure Park Yangtze River Forest, Taicang
