= 2016 IAAF World Race Walking Team Championships =

- Organisers: IAAF
- Edition: 27th
- Date: 7–8 May
- Host city: Rome, Italy
- Events: 5
- Participation: 398 athletes from 55 nations
- Official website: roma2016.org/

The 2016 IAAF World Race Walking Team Championships (Italian: Campionati del mondo a squadre di marcia 2016) was the 27th edition of the global team racewalking competition organised by the International Association of Athletics Federations. It was held in Rome, Italy from 7 to 8 May 2016. It was the first edition of the tournament under its new name, having previously been known as the IAAF World Race Walking Cup since 1989.

== Overview ==
The programme remained unchanged, with senior men's races over 20 km and 50 km, a 20 km senior women's race, and junior category events for both sexes over 10 km. However, following the approval by the IAAF of the women's 50 km walk as an official event, for the first time women were permitted to enter the 50 km. A separate women's 50 km was not scheduled, but women were allowed to enter the men's event and were treated as equal competitors for team scoring.

The local organising committee was headed by Alfio Giomi, the head of the Italian Athletics Federation, and included Maurizio Damilano, a former Olympic champion in racewalking. The competition was organised at relatively short notice – Cheboksary was originally chosen as the host city but the suspension of the All-Russia Athletic Federation for systemic doping issues by the IAAF meant the host bidding was reopened. Rome was the clear winner in the bidding process in January 2016, with nine votes compared to Guayaquil and Kyiv's four and two for Monterrey. It was the fourth time that the competition was held in Italy, with previous editions having visited the country in 1963, 1965 and 2002.

The course was set on the streets of Rome around the Baths of Caracalla. It was a flat looped route, with one loop for the junior races and two for the senior races. The start point was beside the Arch of Constantine and the Colosseum and finishing point was the Stadio delle Terme di Caracalla.

Chinese athletes won both the junior races: Ma Zhenxia took the women's title and Zhang Jun the men's.

The competition was broadcast on television in the host country by Rai Sport 1 and Rai Sport 2.

In June 2016, the Italian sports newspaper La Gazzetta dello Sport, reported that gold medalist in the 50 km men's competition Alex Schwazer had again tested positive to a banned substance. He has since announced at a press conference that he had not taken anabolic steroids, despite his sample from January 1, testing positive on May 12. On 11 August 2016, Schwarzer was stripped of his title and banned for 8 years, due to positive doping test.

== Schedule ==
Date	Time	Round
7 May 2016
7 May 2016	09:30	10 km junior women
7 May 2016	10:35	10 km junior men
7 May 2016	16:00	Opening ceremony
7 May 2016	16:30	20 km women
7 May 2016	18:15	20 km men
8 May 2016
8 May 2016	09:00	50 km men

All times are local times UTC+2

== Medal summary ==
=== Men ===
Race	Gold		Silver		Bronze	
Men's 20 km walk	Wang Zhen (CHN)	1:19:22	Cai Zelin (CHN)	1:19:34	Álvaro Martín (ESP)	1:19:36
Men's 20 km walk team	China (CHN); Wang Zhen; Cai Zelin; Wang Kaihua; Li Tianlei; Chen Ding	16	Canada (CAN); Benjamin Thorne; Iñaki Gomez; Evan Dunfee; Mathieu Bilodeau	27	Ecuador (ECU); Andrés Chocho; Mauricio Arteaga; Brian Pintado; Jordy Jiménez	41
Junior men's 10 km walk	Zhang Jun (CHN)	40:23	Manuel Bermúdez (ESP)	40:27	Noel Alí Chama (MEX)	40:29
Junior men's 10 km walk team	Mexico (MEX); Noel Alí Chama; Andrés Olivas	8 pts	Peru (PER); César Rodríguez; Lenyn Mamani	13 pts	Japan (JPN); Masatora Kawano; Ryutaro Yamamoto; Masaya Ishikawa	17 pts

=== Women ===
Race	Gold		Silver		Bronze	
Women's 20 km walk	Lupita González (MEX)	1:26:17 AR	Qieyang Shenjie (CHN)	1:26:49	Érica de Sena (BRA)	1:27:18
Women's 20 km walk team	China (CHN); Liu Hong; Qieyang Shenjie; Lü Xiuzhi; Yang Jiayu; Nie Jingjing	10	Australia (AUS); Regan Lamble; Beki Smith; Tanya Holliday; Rachel Tallent; Stephanie Stigwood	43	Colombia (COL); Sandra Arenas; Sandra Galvis; Yeseida Carrillo; Arabelly Orjuela	61
Junior women's 10 km walk	Ma Zhenxia (CHN)	45:25	Ma Li (CHN)	45:25	Valeria Ortuño (MEX)	45:28
Junior women's 10 km walk team	China (CHN); Ma Zhenxia; Ma Li; Zhang Lifang	3 pts	Mexico (MEX); Valeria Ortuño; Vivian Castillo; Iliana García	9 pts	Australia (AUS); Clara Smith; Tayla Paige Billington; Zoe Hunt	21 pts

=== Open ===
Race	Gold		Silver		Bronze	
Open 50 km walk (Note: Gold medalist in men's 50 km walk Alex Schwazer (ITA) (3:39:00) was disqualified due to the failed doping test.)	Jared Tallent (AUS)	3:42:36	Ihor Hlavan (UKR)	3:44:02	Marco De Luca (ITA)	3:44:47
Open 50 km walk team	Italy (ITA); Alex Schwazer (Note: Alex Schwazer, who had won the individual race, was later disqualified for doping, but Italy was not taken out of the gold medal team.); Marco De Luca; Teodorico Caporaso; Matteo Giupponi; Federico Tontodonati	14	Ukraine (UKR); Ihor Hlavan; Ivan Banzeruk; Serhiy Budza; Marian Zakalnytstyi; Andriy Hrechovskyi	25	Spain (ESP); José Ignacio Díaz; Francisco Arcilla; Mikel Odriozola; Pablo Oliva	30

== Results ==
=== Men's 20 km ===
Rank	Name	Nationality	Time	Notes	Penalties
1st place, gold medalist(s)	Wang Zhen	China	1:19:22		
2nd place, silver medalist(s)	Cai Zelin	China	1:19:34	SB	
3rd place, bronze medalist(s)	Álvaro Martín	Spain	1:19:36	PB	
4	Dane Bird-Smith	Australia	1:19:38	PB	
5	Benjamin Thorne	Canada	1:19:55	PB	~
6	Andrés Chocho	Ecuador	1:20:07	PB	~~
7	Iñaki Gómez	Canada	1:20:12		
8	Caio Bonfim	Brazil	1:20:20	PB	
9	Ruslan Dmytrenko	Ukraine	1:20:33	SB	
10	Christopher Linke	Germany	1:20:40		
11	Mauricio Arteaga	Ecuador	1:21:08	PB	
12	Eiki Takahashi	Japan	1:21:12		~
13	Wang Kaihua	China	1:21:12		
14	Nazar Kovalenko	Ukraine	1:21:21	SB	~
15	Carl Dohmann	Germany	1:21:26	PB	~~
16	Evan Dunfee	Canada	1:21:26		
17	Alexandros Papamichail	Greece	1:21:33	SB	
18	Iván Garrido	Colombia	1:21:35	PB	
19	Diego García	Spain	1:21:36	PB	
20	Hagen Pohle	Germany	1:21:39		
21	Yerko Araya	Chile	1:21:39		~
22	Ganapathi Krishnan	India	1:21:41	PB	
23	Dzianis Simanovich	Belarus	1:21:48	SB	~~
24	Brian Pintado	Ecuador	1:21:49	PB	
25	Paolo Yurivilca	Peru	1:21:49	NR	~
26	Quentin Rew	New Zealand	1:21:54	NR	
27	Gurmeet Singh	India	1:22:04		~
28	Richard Vargas	Venezuela	1:22:10	NR	
29	Takumi Saito	Japan	1:22:26		
30	João Vieira	Portugal	1:22:39	SB	
31	Manish Singh	India	1:22:41		
32	Ivan Losyev	Ukraine	1:22:43	SB	
33	Miguel Ángel López	Spain	1:22:46	SB	
34	Tom Bosworth	Great Britain	1:22:55		
35	Dawid Tomala	Poland	1:23:07		~
36	Rafał Augustyn	Poland	1:23:09	SB	>>
37	Håvard Haukenes	Norway	1:23:15	PB	
38	Anton Kučmín	Slovakia	1:23:17		
39	Rhydian Cowley	Australia	1:23:21		>
40	Dzmitry Dziubin	Belarus	1:23:32		
41	Satoshi Maruo	Japan	1:23:38		
42	Sandeep Kumar	India	1:23:51		
43	Kim Hyun-sub	South Korea	1:23:51	SB	
44	Georgiy Sheiko	Kazakhstan	1:23:51		~
45	Aliaksandr Liakhovich	Belarus	1:23:59		
46	Jarkko Kinnunen	Finland	1:24:00		~>
47	Moacir Zimmermann	Brazil	1:24:02		
48	Francesco Fortunato	Italy	1:24:19		
49	Choe Byeong-kwang	South Korea	1:24:20		
50	Aurélien Quinion	France	1:24:27	PB	
51	Alberto Amezcua	Spain	1:24:28		
52	Vito Minei	Italy	1:24:42	PB	
53	Jakub Jelonek	Poland	1:24:44		
54	Mert Atlı	Turkey	1:24:45		
55	Alex Wright	Ireland	1:24:46	SB	
56	Benjamin Sánchez	Spain	1:24:50	SB	
57	Lebogang Shange	South Africa	1:24:53		
58	Aleksi Ojala	Finland	1:24:59	PB	>
59	Jean Blancheteau	France	1:25:08	SB	
60	Michele Antonelli	Italy	1:25:11		
61	Nils Brembach	Germany	1:25:20		~
62	Pavel Chihuán	Peru	1:25:24	SB	
63	Brendan Boyce	Ireland	1:25:38	SB	
64	Jhon Castañeda	Colombia	1:25:46	SB	~
65	Marius Šavelskis	Lithuania	1:26:02		
66	Ersin Tacir	Turkey	1:26:14		
67	Leonardo Dei Tos	Italy	1:26:38		
68	Robert Heffernan	Ireland	1:26:48		>
69	Isamu Fujisawa	Japan	1:26:54		
70	Wayne Snyman	South Africa	1:27:15		
71	Cian McManamon	Ireland	1:27:26	PB	
72	Kenny Martín Pérez	Colombia	1:27:39	SB	
73	Yassir Cabrera	Panama	1:27:46	PB	~
74	Miguel Carvalho	Portugal	1:28:03		
75	Li Tianlei	China	1:28:21		
76	Park Chil-sung	South Korea	1:28:32	SB	
77	Dušan Majdán	Slovakia	1:28:42		
78	Marco Antonio Rodríguez	Bolivia	1:28:44		
79	Rafał Fedaczyński	Poland	1:28:56		
80	Jordy Jiménez	Ecuador	1:29:17		
81	Luis Colón	Puerto Rico	1:29:25	SB	~
82	Rudney Nogueira	Brazil	1:29:30	SB	
83	Andriy Kovenko	Ukraine	1:29:32		~
84	Kostyantyn Puzanov	Ukraine	1:29:50		>
85	Predrag Filipović	Serbia	1:29:53		
86	Emmanuel Corvera	United States	1:29:56		~~
87	Şahin Şenoduncu	Turkey	1:30:46		
88	Adrian Ionuţ Dragomir	Romania	1:31:03	SB	>
89	Mathieu Bilodeau	Canada	1:31:13	SB	
90	Anthony Peters	United States	1:31:19	PB	
91	Yauhen Zaleski	Belarus	1:31:31		~~
92	Fabián Bernabé	France	1:32:10	SB	
93	Miroslav Úradník	Slovakia	1:32:23		
94	Brendon Reading	Australia	1:32:32		
95	Nathan Brill	Australia	1:32:48		
96	Joo Hyeon-myeong	South Korea	1:33:35	PB	
97	Matthew Forgues	United States	1:35:42	PB	
98	Sizwe Ndebele	South Africa	1:36:12		
99	Josè Romero	Honduras	1:36:59	SB	
100	Deiby Cordero	Costa Rica	1:37:06		
101	Lauri Lelumees	Estonia	1:44:12	SB	>>
102	Matthew Dewitt	United States	1:46:59		>
	Éider Arévalo	Colombia	DNF		
	Ebrahim Rahimian	Iran	DNF		
	Peter Van Hove	Belgium	DNF		*
	Serkan Doğan	Turkey	DNF		
	Michal Morvay	Slovakia	DNF		>
	José Alessandro Bagio	Brazil	DNF		
	Chen Ding	China	DNF		
	Kai Kobayashi	Japan	DNF		
	Luís Alfonso López	El Salvador	DNF		
	José Leonardo Montaña	Colombia	DNF		
	Veli-Matti Partanen	Finland	DNF		
	John Cody Risch	United States	DNF		>
	Giorgio Rubino	Italy	DNF		~
	Sérgio Vieira	Portugal	DNF		
	Singh Devender	India	DQ		~~~
	Dominic King	Great Britain	DQ		~>>
	Hamid Reza Zooravand	Iran	DQ		~>>
	Raouf Ben Behi	Tunisia	DQ		>>>
	Lukáš Gdula	Czech Republic	DQ		>>>
	Matias Korpela	Finland	DQ		>>>
	Mohammed Abusweilem	Palestine	DNS		
	Michael Hosking	Australia	DNS		

=== Team (Men 20 km) ===
Rank	Team	Points
1	China	16
2	Canada	28
3	Ecuador	41
4	Germany	45
5	Ukraine	55
6	Spain	55
7	India	80
8	Japan	82
9	Belarus	108
10	Poland	124
11	Brazil	137
12	Australia	137
13	Colombia	154
14	Italy	160
15	South Korea	168
16	Ireland	186
17	France	201
18	Turkey	207
19	Slovakia	208
20	South Africa	225
21	United States	273

=== Men's 10 km (Junior) ===
Rank	Name	Nationality	Time	Notes	Penalties
1st place, gold medalist(s)	Zhang Jun	China	40:23		
2nd place, silver medalist(s)	Manuel Bermúdez	Spain	40:27	PB	
3rd place, bronze medalist(s)	Noel Alí Chama	Mexico	40:29	PB	~
4	Callum Wilkinson	Great Britain	40:29	NU20R	~~
5	Andrés Olivas	Mexico	40:43	PB	~
6	César Rodríguez	Peru	41:08	SB	~
7	Lenyn Mamani	Peru	41:16	PB	
8	Masatora Kawano	Japan	41:22		~
9	Ryutaro Yamamoto	Japan	41:37		
10	Cristian Merchán	Colombia	41:48	PB	~
11	Salih Korkmaz	Turkey	41:53	PB	
12	Dominik Černý	Slovakia	42:07	PB	
13	Leo Köpp	Germany	42:14	PB	
14	Adam Garganis	Australia	42:24	PB	
15	César Herrera	Colombia	42:44	SB	
16	Hu Linfeng	China	42:50	SB	
17	Gabriel Bordier	France	42:50		
18	Jhonatan Amores	Ecuador	42:51	PB	
19	Guy Thomas	Great Britain	42:55	PB	>>
20	Eduard Zabuzhenko	Ukraine	42:58	PB	>
21	Daniel Chamosa	Spain	43:00		
22	Giacomo Brandi	Italy	43:06		
23	Mikita Kaliada	Belarus	43:07		
24	Sebastián Merchán	Colombia	43:09	PB	
25	Iván López	Spain	43:20	PB	
26	Cameron Corbishley	Great Britain	43:27		~
27	Masaya Ishikawa	Japan	43:32		
28	Ruslan Udodau	Belarus	43:39		~
29	David Kuster	France	43:42	PB	
30	Oleksandr Zholob	Ukraine	43:56	SB	
31	Thibaut Hypolite	France	44:05	SB	~~
32	Kyle Swan	Australia	44:07		
33	Łukasz Niedziałek	Poland	44:12		~
34	Zenamarkos Asmare	Ethiopia	44:47	NU20R	>
35	Dzmitry Lukyanchuk	Belarus	44:49		
36	Vít Hlaváč	Czech Republic	44:52		
37	Matheus Correa	Brazil	45:02		
38	Volodymyr Mytsyk	Ukraine	45:15	PB	>
39	Arkadiusz Drozdowicz	Poland	45:36		
40	Tyler Jones	Australia	45:40		>
41	Cameron Haught	United States	45:42	PB	
42	Zamanbek Bababek	Kazakhstan	46:02		
43	Soma Kovács	Hungary	46:18		>
44	Nicolò Coppini	Italy	46:40		
45	Jovan Delčev	Serbia	46:54		>>
46	Juan Manuel Calderon	Costa Rica	46:54	NU20R	
47	Alessandro Rigamonti	Italy	46:59		>>>
48	Mustafa Özbek	Turkey	47:14		
49	Alexander Bellavance	United States	47:38	PB	
50	Ruslan Sergatsjov	Estonia	48:00	PB	>
51	Jamie Shaw	New Zealand	48:15		
52	Nathan Bonzon	Switzerland	48:38		>>
53	Anthony Gruttadauro	United States	48:40		
54	Anže Tesovnik	Slovenia	50:23		
	Pablo Rodríguez	Bolivia	DNF		
	Donát Burger	Hungary	DQ		>>>>
	Jin Xiangqian	China	DQ		~~~~

=== Team (Men 10 km junior) ===
Rank	Team	Points
1	Mexico	8
2	Peru	13
3	Japan	17
4	China	17
5	Great Britain	23
6	Spain	23
7	Colombia	25
8	France	46
9	Australia	46
10	Ukraine	50
11	Belarus	51
12	Turkey	59
13	Italy	66
14	Poland	72
15	United States	90

=== Women's 20 km ===
Rank	Name	Nationality	Time	Notes	Penalties
~~1~~	Liu Hong	China	~~1:25:59~~	DQ	
1st place, gold medalist(s)	Lupita González	Mexico	1:26:17	AR	
2nd place, silver medalist(s)	Qieyang Shijie	China	1:26:49	SB	
3rd place, bronze medalist(s)	Érica de Sena	Brazil	1:27:18	AR	
4	Elisa Rigaudo	Italy	1:28:03	SB	>
5	Lü Xiuzhi	China	1:28:36		~~
6	Ana Cabecinha	Portugal	1:28:40	SB	
7	Yang Jiayu	China	1:28:56	SB	
8	Inês Henriques	Portugal	1:29:00	PB	
9	Raquel González	Spain	1:29:01	SB	
10	Sandra Arenas	Colombia	1:29:31	NR	
11	Regan Lamble	Australia	1:29:33	PB	
12	Kimberly García	Peru	1:29:38	NR	
13	Júlia Takács	Spain	1:29:47	SB	
14	Beki Smith	Australia	1:29:49	PB	~~
15	Tanya Holliday	Australia	1:29:49	PB	>>
16	Nie Jingjing	China	1:30:02	SB	
17	Ángela Castro	Bolivia	1:30:33	NR	
18	Inna Kashyna	Ukraine	1:30:34	SB	
19	Anežka Drahotová	Czech Republic	1:31:15		
20	Nadiya Borovska	Ukraine	1:31:32	SB	
21	Brigita Virbalytė-Dimšienė	Lithuania	1:31:52		
22	Sandra Galvis	Colombia	1:32:00		~
23	Valentina Trapletti	Italy	1:32:04		
24	Ai Michiguchi	Japan	1:32:43		~~
25	Alana Barber	New Zealand	1:32:48	NR	
26	Yeseida Carrillo	Colombia	1:33:05	PB	
27	Wendy Cornejo	Bolivia	1:33:15	PB	~
28	Jessica Hancco	Peru	1:33:20	PB	
29	Katarzyna Golba	Poland	1:33:24		
30	Rena Goto	Japan	1:33:29		
31	Jeon Yeong-eun	South Korea	1:33:32	SB	>~
32	Paola Pérez	Ecuador	1:33:35	SB	
33	Mária Gáliková	Slovakia	1:33:43		
34	Panayiota Tsinopoulou	Greece	1:33:47	PB	
35	Nastassia Yatsevich	Belarus	1:33:52		
36	Neringa Aidietytė	Lithuania	1:34:06		>
37	Miranda Melville	United States	1:34:10		
38	Laura Polli	Switzerland	1:34:11		
39	Antigoni Drisbioti	Greece	1:34:11		
40	Rachel Tallent	Australia	1:34:16		
41	Arabelly Orjuela	Colombia	1:34:19	SB	~
42	Violaine Averous	France	1:34:21	SB	~
43	Magaly Bonilla	Ecuador	1:34:21	PB	~~
44	Ainhoa Pinedo	Spain	1:34:30		
45	Mária Czaková	Slovakia	1:34:47		
46	Askale Tiksa	Ethiopia	1:34:50	NR	
47	Maritza Guaman	Ecuador	1:35:07	PB	
48	Katarzyna Zdziebło	Poland	1:35:20		
49	Valentyna Myronchuk	Ukraine	1:35:28	PB	
50	Daniela Cardoso	Portugal	1:35:37		
51	Ana Veronica Rodean	Romania	1:35:38		
52	Alina Tsvilii	Ukraine	1:36:00	PB	
53	Živilė Vaiciukevičiūtė	Lithuania	1:36:14		
54	Olena Shumkina	Ukraine	1:36:20		
55	Yesenia Miranda	El Salvador	1:36:27	PB	
56	Émilie Menuet	France	1:36:43		
57	Stefany Coronado	Bolivia	1:37:00	SB	
58	Chahinez Nasri	Tunisia	1:37:42		
59	Nicole Colombi	Italy	1:37:47		
60	Andreea Arsine	Romania	1:37:48		
61	Mylène Ortiz	France	1:37:54		
62	Regina Rykova	Kazakhstan	1:37:54		
63	Johana Ordóñez	Ecuador	1:38:25	SB	
64	Polina Repina	Kazakhstan	1:38:36	SB	
65	Aynalem Eshetu	Ethiopia	1:38:39	PB	
66	Stephanie Stigwood	Australia	1:38:42		
67	Diana Aydosova	Kazakhstan	1:39:01		
68	Dušica Topić	Serbia	1:39:31	NR	
69	Ching Siu Nga	Hong Kong	1:39:39		
70	Ayalnesh Dejene	Ethiopia	1:40:04	PB	
71	Priyanka Goswami	India	1:40:04	PB	
72	Vera Santos	Portugal	1:40:27	SB	
73	Mihaela Pușcașu	Romania	1:40:38		~~
74	Masumi Fuchise	Japan	1:40:40		
75	Monika Vaiciukevičiūtė	Lithuania	1:40:48		
76	Marie Polli	Switzerland	1:40:48	SB	>
77	Anel Oosthuizen	South Africa	1:41:12		>
78	Ekaterini Theodoropoulou	Greece	1:41:29	SB	
79	Mihaela Acatrinei	Romania	1:41:35		~
80	Monika Hornáková	Slovakia	1:42:22		>
81	Amandine Marcou	France	1:42:56		
82	Nair da Rosa	Brazil	1:43:04	PB	
83	Liliane Priscila Barbosa	Brazil	1:43:18	PB	
84	Kathleen Burnett	United States	1:43:22		
85	Lucie Auffret	France	1:45:19		
86	Dana Aydosova	Kazakhstan	1:46:25		
87	Erin Gray	United States	1:46:51		
88	Danica Gogov	Serbia	1:47:47	PB	
	Ameni Mannai	Tunisia	DNF	*	
	Susana Feitor	Portugal	DNF		
	Khushbir Kaur	India	DNF		
	Cisiane Lopes	Brazil	DNF		
	Maria Michta-Coffey	United States	DNF		
	Beatriz Pascual	Spain	DNF		
	María José Poves	Spain	DNF		
	Kristina Saltanovič	Lithuania	DNF		
	Agnieszka Szwarnóg	Poland	DNF		>
	Despina Zapounidou	Greece	DNF		
	Paulina Buziak	Poland	DQ		>>>
	Bethan Davies	Great Britain	DQ		~~~
	Sibilla Di Vincenzo	Italy	DQ		>>>
	Eleonora Giorgi	Italy	DQ		~~~
	Monika Kapera	Poland	DQ		>>>
	Robyn Stevens	United States	DNS		

=== Team (Women 20 km) ===
Rank	Team	Points
1	China	14
2	Australia	40
3	Colombia	58
4	Portugal	64
5	Spain	66
6	Italy	86
7	Ukraine	87
8	Bolivia	101
9	Lithuania	110
10	Ecuador	122
11	Japan	128
12	Greece	151
13	Slovakia	158
14	France	159
15	Brazil	168
16	Ethiopia	181
17	Romania	184
18	Kazakhstan	193
19	United States	208

=== Women's 10 km (Junior) ===
Rank	Name	Nationality	Time	Notes	Penalties
1st place, gold medalist(s)	Ma Zhenxia	China	45:25		
2nd place, silver medalist(s)	Ma Li	China	45:25		~~
3rd place, bronze medalist(s)	Valeria Ortuño	Mexico	45:28	AU20R	
4	Noemi Stella	Italy	45:55	SB	
5	Taika Nummi	Finland	46:08		
6	Vivian Castillo	Mexico	46:56	PB	~
7	Clara Smith	Australia	47:10		
8	Karla Jaramillo	Ecuador	47:11	NU20R	
9	Zhang Lifang	China	47:14		
10	Yukiho Mizoguchi	Japan	47:25		~~
11	Iliana García	Mexico	47:25		
12	Evelyn Inga	Peru	47:34	NU20R	
13	Leyde Guerra	Peru	47:34	NU20R	
14	Tayla Billington	Australia	47:41		
15	María Montoya	Colombia	47:53	SB	
16	Marina Peña	Spain	48:04	PB	
17	Zoe Hunt	Australia	48:11		>~~
18	Dimitra Bohori	Greece	48:12	PB	
19	Emilia Lehmeyer	Germany	48:13	PB	
20	Giada Francesca Ciabini	Italy	48:36		
21	Maika Yagi	Japan	48:50		
22	Zofia Kreja	Poland	48:50		>>
23	Emma Achurch	Great Britain	48:50		>>
24	Irene Montejo	Spain	49:14		
25	Odeth Huanca	Bolivia	49:19		
26	Sayori Matsumoto	Japan	49:22	SB	
27	Eloïse Terrec	France	49:22	PB	
28	Saskia Feige	Germany	49:46	PB	
29	Michelle Semblantes	Ecuador	49:48		
30	Valeryia Komel	Belarus	49:53		
31	Meaghan Podlaski	United States	49:57	NU20R	
32	Clemence Beretta	France	50:04	PB	
33	Enni Nurmi	Finland	50:06	PB	
34	Olga Niedziałek	Poland	50:18		~~~
35	Teresa Zurek	Germany	50:30		>
36	Camille Aurriere	France	50:38		
37	Anali Cisneros	United States	50:38		
38	Carmen Escariz	Spain	51:38		
39	Anastasia Sanzana	Chile	51:43		
40	Carolina Costa	Portugal	51:49		
41	Kristina Povorozniuk	Ukraine	51:49		
42	Kateřina Maternová	Czech Republic	52:08		~~
43	Daria Khusainova	Ukraine	52:10	PB	
44	Yuliia Balym	Ukraine	52:20		
45	Laura Langley	New Zealand	52:53		
46	Yelizaveta Spirina	Kazakhstan	53:00	PB	
47	Kayla Allen	United States	55:51		
	Anthea Mirabello	Italy	DQ		>>>>

=== Team (Women 10 km junior) ===
Rank	Team	Points
1	China	3
2	Mexico	9
3	Australia	21
4	Italy	24
5	Peru	25
6	Japan	31
7	Ecuador	37
8	Finland	38
9	Spain	40
10	Germany	47
11	Poland	56
12	France	59
13	United States	68
14	Ukraine	84

=== Open 50 km ===
Rank	Name	Nationality	Time	Notes	Penalties
~~1~~	Alex Schwazer	Italy	~~3:39:00~~	SB	
1st place, gold medalist(s)	Jared Tallent	Australia	3:42:36	SB	
2nd place, silver medalist(s)	Igor Glavan	Ukraine	3:44:02	SB	
3rd place, bronze medalist(s)	Marco De Luca	Italy	3:44:47	PB	~
4	Teodorico Caporaso	Italy	3:48:29	PB	~
5	José Ignacio Díaz	Spain	3:51:10	SB	
6	Ivan Banzeruk	Ukraine	3:51:57	SB	
7	Matteo Giupponi	Italy	3:52:27	SB	
8	Jorge Armando Ruiz	Colombia	3:52:27	PB	>>
9	Damian Błocki	Poland	3:54:26	SB	
10	Rolando Saquipay	Ecuador	3:54:32	SB	
11	Francisco Arcilla	Spain	3:55:06	PB	
12	Federico Tontodonati	Italy	3:55:17	PB	
13	Claudio Villanueva	Ecuador	3:58:56	SB	
14	Mikel Odriozola	Spain	3:59:58		
15	James Rendón	Colombia	4:00:31	SB	
16	Jorge Alejandro Martínez	Mexico	4:00:59		>>
17	Serhiy Budza	Ukraine	4:00:59	SB	>>
18	Xu Faguang	China	4:01:36	SB	
19	Yerenman Salazar	Venezuela	4:02:48	NR	
20	Narcis Mihăilă	Romania	4:03:42	PB	
21	Jonnathan Cáceres	Ecuador	4:04:29	SB	
22	Pablo Oliva	Spain	4:05:41		
23	Luis Henry Campos	Peru	4:05:47	PB	
24	Omar Sierra	Colombia	4:05:56		
25	Grzegorz Sudoł	Poland	4:07:53	SB	>
26	Jitendra Singh	India	4:08:36	PB	>
27	Fredy Hernández	Colombia	4:10:53	SB	
28	Marian Zakalnytstyi	Ukraine	4:13:24	SB	
29	Zhang Hang	China	4:17:03		
30	Dávid Tokodi	Hungary	4:17:22		
31	Zhang Lin	China	4:19:43		>
32	Kang Kil-dong	South Korea	4:20:24	PB	>
33	Rob Tersteeg	Netherlands	4:21:33	PB	
34	Nicholas Christie	United States	4:24:55	SB	
35	Steven Washburn	United States	4:28:20	PB	~
36	Michael Mannozzi	United States	4:39:33	PB	~
37	Hatem Ghoula	Tunisia	4:40:50	SB	
38	Ozan Pamuk	Turkey	4:44:46	NR	
39	Erin Talcott	United States	4:51:08		
	Marius Cocioran	Romania	DNF		
	Konstadinos Dedopoulos	Greece	DNF		>
	Alejandro Francisco Florez	Switzerland	DNF		
	Jesús Ángel García	Spain	DNF		
	Han Yucheng	China	DNF		
	Pedro Isidro	Portugal	DNF		
	Perseus Karlström	Sweden	DNF		
	Luis Fernando López	Colombia	DNF		
	Ronald Quispe	Bolivia	DNF		
	Chandan Singh	India	DNF		>
	Erik Tysse	Norway	DNF		
	Hugo Andrieu	France	DQ		>>>
	Andriy Hrechkovskyi	Ukraine	DQ		>>>
	Ato Ibáñez	Sweden	DQ		>>>
	Eemeli Kiiski	Finland	DQ		~~>
	Xavier Le Coz	France	DQ		~~~
	Liu Jian	China	DQ		>>>
	Ondrej Motl	Czech Republic	DQ		~~~
	Basanta Bahadur Rana	India	DQ		>>>
	Maciej Rosiewicz	Georgia	DQ		>>>
	Pavel Schrom	Czech Republic	DQ		>>>
	Rafał Sikora	Poland	DQ		>>>
	Edmund Sim	Singapore	DQ		>>>
	Florin Alin Știrbu	Romania	DQ		>>>
	Catalin Suhani	Romania	DQ		>>>
	Ian Whatley	United States	DQ		>>>
	Anders Hansson	Sweden	DNS		

=== Team (Open 50 km) ===
Rank	Team	Points
1	Italy	14
2	Ukraine	25
3	Spain	30
4	Ecuador	44
5	Colombia	47
6	China	78
7	United States	105

== Medal table ==
The host country is highlighted in lavender blue

Rank	Nation	Gold	Silver	Bronze	Total
1	China	6	3	0	9
2	Mexico	2	1	2	5
3	Australia	1	1	1	3
4	Italy*	1	0	1	2
5	Ukraine	0	2	0	2
6	Spain	0	1	2	3
7	Canada	0	1	0	1
7	Peru	0	1	0	1
9	Brazil	0	0	1	1
9	Colombia	0	0	1	1
9	Ecuador	0	0	1	1
9	Japan	0	0	1	1
Totals (12 entries)		10	10	10	30

- Note: Totals include both individual and team medals, with medals in the team competition counting as one medal.

== Participation ==
According to an unofficial count, 398 athletes from 55 countries participated.

- Australia (16)
- Belarus (9)
- Belgium (1)
- Bolivia (7)
- Brazil (9)
- Canada (4)
- Chile (2)
- China (21)
- Colombia (18)
- Costa Rica (2)
- Czech Republic (6)
- Ecuador (14)
- Estonia (2)
- Ethiopia (4)
- Finland (7)
- France (16)
- Georgia (1)
- Germany (8)
- Great Britain (7)
- Greece (7)
- Honduras (1)
- Hong Kong (1)
- Hungary (3)
- India (10)
- Iran (2)
- Ireland (4)
- Italy (21)
- Japan (14)
- Kazakhstan (7)
- Lithuania (6)
- Mexico (7)
- Netherlands (1)
- New Zealand (4)
- Norway (2)
- Panama (1)
- Peru (9)
- Poland (16)
- Portugal (10)
- Puerto Rico (1)
- Romania (9)
- El Salvador (2)
- Serbia (4)
- Singapore (1)
- Slovakia (8)
- Slovenia (1)
- South Africa (4)
- South Korea (6)
- Spain (21)
- Sweden (3)
- Switzerland (4)
- Tunisia (4)
- Turkey (7)
- Ukraine (21)
- United States (20)
- Venezuela (2)
