= Athletics at the 2024 Summer Olympics =

Athletics at the Games of the XXXIII Olympiad
- Venue: Stade de France (track and field events); Pont d'Iéna (race walk); Hôtel de Ville and Les Invalides (Marathon)
- Dates: 1–11 August 2024
- No. of events: 48 (23 men, 23 women, 2 mixed)
- Competitors: 1,810

Athletics at the 2024 Summer Olympics in Paris were held between 1 and 11 August 2024, featuring a total of 48 medal events across three distinct sets: track and field, road running, and racewalking. Four venues were used: Pont d'Iéna for race walking, Hôtel de Ville and Les Invalides for the start and end points of the marathon races, and Stade de France for the track and field events.

The competition featured an identical number of medal events for men and women, the first instance in Olympic history. The marathon race walk mixed relay through a marathon course was contested for the only time at these Games, replacing the men's 50 kilometres race walk for co-ed sport.

Another significant change to the athletics program was the repechage round format in all individual track events from 200 to 1500 m and the hurdles events (110 m for men, 100 m for women, and 400 m for both), a vast opportunity for the runners to have a second chance of entering the semifinal phase. This format replaced the former system of athletes advancing through the fastest overall times (q) apart from those qualifying directly in the first-round heats (Q).

== Venues ==
Track and field events were staged at the Stade de France, with the race walks having been contested at Pont d'Iena. The marathon races began at the Hôtel de Ville (city hall) and ended in Les Invalides. Along the course, runners traversed many of the city's most iconic sites and Olympic venues throughout the route.

This traditional marathon course also set a particularly tough profile with an overall elevation gain or loss of 438 m. The route, specially designed for the Paris 2024 Games and approved by World Athletics, was described by the Committee as "unique, demanding, and technical". Paris 2024 unveiled the routes for the Olympic marathon and the two races – a 42.195 km course and a 10 km course – open to the general public as part of the mass event running.

== Schedule ==
Road events (marathons and racewalks) were held in the morning session of the athletics program schedule, with all track, field, and combined events staging their finals in the evening session for the first time since London 2012.

For the first time in its four-decade-long Olympic history since the 1984 Los Angeles Games, the women's marathon occurred on the last day of the athletics program on 11 August, with the men's race having taken place the day prior on 10 August. According to Tony Estanguet, a triple Olympic slalom canoeing champion and president of the Paris 2024 organising committee, "We wanted to reverse the order in an ambition to more gender equality and bring women to the fore for the first time so the women's marathon will enjoy major visibility on 11 August to cap off the athletics program."

Legend
P	Preliminary round	Q	Qualification	H	Heats	R	Repechage	½	Semi-finals	F	Final

Schedule
Men's
Date	1 Aug		2 Aug		3 Aug			4 Aug			5 Aug		6 Aug		7 Aug		8 Aug		9 Aug		10 Aug		
Event	M	E	M	E	M		E	M	E		M	E	M	E	M	E	M	E	M	E	M	E	
100 m					P	H			½	F													
200 m												H	R			½		F					
400 m									H		R			½		F							
800 m															H		R		½			F	
1500 m			H				R		½					F									
5000 m															H							F	
10,000 m				F																			
110 m hurdles								H					R			½		F					
400 m hurdles											H		R			½				F			
3000 m steeplechase												H				F							
4 × 100 m relay																	H			F			
4 × 400 m relay																			H			F	
Marathon																					F		
20 km walk	F																						
High jump															Q							F	
Pole vault							Q					F											
Long jump								Q						F									
Triple jump																Q				F			
Shot put				Q			F																
Discus throw											Q					F							
Hammer throw			Q						F														
Javelin throw													Q					F					
Decathlon			F																				
Women's
Date	1 Aug		2 Aug			3 Aug			4 Aug		5 Aug		6 Aug		7 Aug		8 Aug		9 Aug		10 Aug		11 Aug
Event	M	E	M		E	M	E		M	E	M	E	M	E	M	E	M	E	M	E	M	E	M
100 m			P	H			½	F															
200 m									H		R	½		F									
400 m											H		R			½				F			
800 m					H	R				½		F											
1500 m													H		R			½				F	
5000 m					H							F											
10,000 m																				F			
100 m hurdles															H		R		½			F	
400 m hurdles									H		R			½				F					
3000 m steeplechase									H					F									
4 × 100 m relay																	H			F			
4 × 400 m relay																			H			F	
Marathon																							F
20 km walk	F																						
High jump			Q							F													
Pole vault											Q					F							
Long jump													Q					F					
Triple jump					Q		F																
Shot put																	Q			F			
Discus throw					Q							F											
Hammer throw									Q					F									
Javelin throw															Q							F	
Heptathlon																	F						
Mixed
Date			2 Aug			3 Aug									7 Aug								
Event			M		E	M	E								M	E							
4 × 400 m relay					H		F																
Mixed marathon walk relay															F								

== Qualification ==
=== Athletics – individual events ===
At the end of the 2022 season, World Athletics established a qualification system for athletics competition at the 2024 Summer Olympics. Similar to the previous edition, the qualification system was set on a dual pathway, where the initial half of the total quota (about fifty percent) was distributed to the athletes through entry standards approved by the World Athletics council, with the remainder relying on the world ranking list within the qualifying period. Each country was able to enter a maximum of three athletes for each individual event on the Paris 2024 athletics program. The qualification period for all track and field events (except the 10,000 metres, heptathlon, and decathlon) ran from 1 July 2023 to 30 June 2024.

=== Athletics – relay teams ===
Each relay event featured sixteen teams from their respective NOCs, composed of the following:

- 14: top fourteen teams based on their results achieved at the 2024 World Athletics Relays in Nassau, Bahamas
- 2: top two teams outside the key qualifier according to the World Athletics performance list for relays within the qualification period (31 December 2022 to 30 June 2024)

=== Athletics – marathon race walking mixed teams ===
The marathon race walking mixed relay event, covering a distance of marathon (42.195 km), featured twenty-five pairs from their respective NOCs, composed of the following:

- 22: top twenty-two teams based on their results achieved at the 2024 World Athletics Race Walking Team Championships
- 3: top three teams outside the key qualifier through the World Athletics Race Walk rankings based on the aggregate scores of both a male and a female athlete within the qualification period (31 December 2022 to 30 June 2024)

=== Athletics – 10,000 metres, road, and combined events ===
The qualification period for the marathon ran from 1 November 2022 to 30 April 2024. For the 10,000 metres, combined events (men's decathlon and women's heptathlon) and racewalking, the qualification period ran from 31 December 2022 to 30 June 2024.

In the marathon races, any runner ranked higher than the sixty-fifth-place athlete on the filtered Quota Place "Road to Paris" list on 30 January 2024, was deemed eligible for immediate selection to his or her respective national team at the Games. Beyond the deadline, the remaining twenty percent of the total quota was determined by the same dual pathway qualification criteria outlined above without displacing any qualified athletes on the set date.

== Medal summary ==
=== Medal table ===
* Host nation (France)

Rank	NOC	Gold	Silver	Bronze	Total
1	United States	14	11	9	34
2	Kenya	4	2	5	11
3	Canada	3	1	1	5
4	Netherlands	2	1	3	6
5	Spain	2	1	1	4
6	Norway	2	1	0	3
7	Great Britain	1	4	5	10
8	Jamaica	1	3	2	6
9	Ethiopia	1	3	0	4
10	Australia	1	2	4	7
11	Germany	1	2	1	4
12	China	1	1	2	4
13	Belgium	1	1	1	3
14	Bahrain	1	1	0	2
14	Botswana	1	1	0	2
14	Ecuador	1	1	0	2
14	New Zealand	1	1	0	2
14	Saint Lucia	1	1	0	2
14	Uganda	1	1	0	2
20	Ukraine	1	0	2	3
21	Greece	1	0	1	2
22	Dominica	1	0	0	1
22	Dominican Republic	1	0	0	1
22	Japan	1	0	0	1
22	Morocco	1	0	0	1
22	Pakistan	1	0	0	1
22	Sweden	1	0	0	1
28	South Africa	0	2	0	2
29	Italy	0	1	2	3
30	Brazil	0	1	1	2
31	France*	0	1	0	1
31	Hungary	0	1	0	1
31	India	0	1	0	1
31	Lithuania	0	1	0	1
31	Portugal	0	1	0	1
36	Grenada	0	0	2	2
37	Algeria	0	0	1	1
37	Croatia	0	0	1	1
37	Czech Republic	0	0	1	1
37	Poland	0	0	1	1
37	Puerto Rico	0	0	1	1
37	Qatar	0	0	1	1
37	Zambia	0	0	1	1
Totals (43 entries)		48	48	49	145

=== Men's events ===
Event	Gold		Silver		Bronze	
100 metres	Noah Lyles; United States	9.79 (.784) PB	Kishane Thompson; Jamaica	9.79 (.789)	Fred Kerley; United States	9.81 SB
200 metres	Letsile Tebogo; Botswana	19.46 AR	Kenny Bednarek; United States	19.62	Noah Lyles; United States	19.70
400 metres	Quincy Hall; United States	43.40 PB	Matthew Hudson-Smith; Great Britain	43.44 AR	Muzala Samukonga; Zambia	43.74 NR
800 metres	Emmanuel Wanyonyi; Kenya	1:41.19 PB	Marco Arop; Canada	1:41.20 AR	Djamel Sedjati; Algeria	1:41.50
1500 metres	Cole Hocker; United States	3:27.65 OR, AR	Josh Kerr; Great Britain	3:27.79 NR	Yared Nuguse; United States	3:27.80 PB
5000 metres	Jakob Ingebrigtsen; Norway	13:13.66 SB	Ronald Kwemoi; Kenya	13:15.04	Grant Fisher; United States	13:15.13
10,000 metres	Joshua Cheptegei; Uganda	26:43.14 OR	Berihu Aregawi; Ethiopia	26:43.44	Grant Fisher; United States	26:43.46 SB
110 metres hurdles	Grant Holloway; United States	12.99	Daniel Roberts; United States	13.09 (.085)	Rasheed Broadbell; Jamaica	13.09 (.088) SB
400 metres hurdles	Rai Benjamin; United States	46.46 =SB	Karsten Warholm; Norway	47.06	Alison dos Santos; Brazil	47.26
3000 metres steeplechase	Soufiane El Bakkali; Morocco	8:06.05 SB	Kenneth Rooks; United States	8:06.41 PB	Abraham Kibiwot; Kenya	8:06.47 SB
4 × 100 metres relay	Canada; Aaron Brown; Jerome Blake; Brendon Rodney; Andre De Grasse	37.50 SB	South Africa; Bayanda Walaza; Shaun Maswanganyi; Bradley Nkoana; Akani Simbine	37.57 AR	Great Britain; Jeremiah Azu; Louie Hinchliffe; Nethaneel Mitchell-Blake; Zharnel Hughes; Richard Kilty^{[b]}	37.61 SB
4 × 400 metres relay	United States; Christopher Bailey; Vernon Norwood; Bryce Deadmon; Rai Benjamin; Quincy Wilson^{[b]}	2:54.43 OR	Botswana; Bayapo Ndori; Busang Collen Kebinatshipi; Anthony Pesela; Letsile Tebogo	2:54.53 AR	Great Britain; Alex Haydock-Wilson; Matthew Hudson-Smith; Lewis Davey; Charlie Dobson; Samuel Reardon^{[b]} Toby Harries^{[b]}	2:55.83 AR
Marathon	Tamirat Tola; Ethiopia	2:06:26 OR	Bashir Abdi; Belgium	2:06:47	Benson Kipruto; Kenya	2:07:00
20 kilometres walk	Brian Pintado; Ecuador	1:18:55	Caio Bonfim; Brazil	1:19:09	Álvaro Martín; Spain	1:19:11
High jump	Hamish Kerr; New Zealand	2.36 m =AR	Shelby McEwen; United States	2.36 m PB	Mutaz Barsham; Qatar	2.34 m SB
Pole vault	Armand Duplantis; Sweden	6.25 m WR	Sam Kendricks; United States	5.95 m =SB	Emmanouil Karalis; Greece	5.90 m
Long jump	Miltiadis Tentoglou; Greece	8.48 m	Wayne Pinnock; Jamaica	8.36 m	Mattia Furlani; Italy	8.34 m
Triple jump	Jordan Díaz; Spain	17.86 m	Pedro Pichardo; Portugal	17.84 m	Andy Díaz; Italy	17.64 m SB
Shot put	Ryan Crouser; United States	22.90 m SB	Joe Kovacs; United States	22.15 m	Rajindra Campbell; Jamaica	22.15 m
Discus throw	Rojé Stona; Jamaica	70.00 m OR, PB	Mykolas Alekna; Lithuania	69.97 m	Matthew Denny; Australia	69.31 m
Hammer throw	Ethan Katzberg; Canada	84.12 m	Bence Halász; Hungary	79.97 m	Mykhaylo Kokhan; Ukraine	79.39 m
Javelin throw	Arshad Nadeem; Pakistan	92.97 m OR	Neeraj Chopra; India	89.45 m SB	Anderson Peters; Grenada	88.54 m
Decathlon	Markus Rooth; Norway	8796 pts NR	Leo Neugebauer; Germany	8748 pts	Lindon Victor; Grenada	8711 pts SB

=== Women's events ===
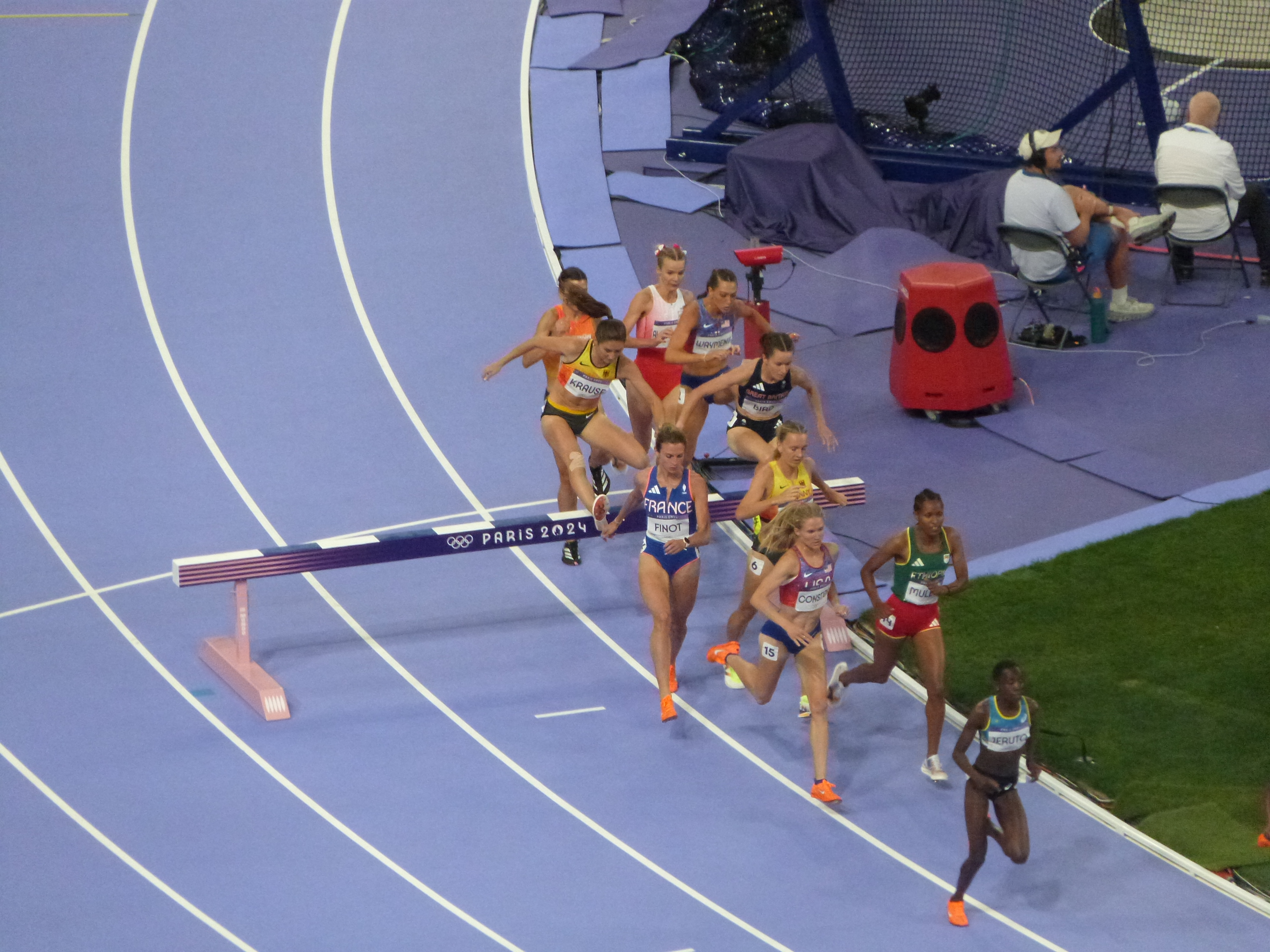
Women's 3000 metres Steeplechase final

Event	Gold		Silver		Bronze	
100 metres	Julien Alfred; Saint Lucia	10.72 NR	Sha'Carri Richardson; United States	10.87	Melissa Jefferson; United States	10.92
200 metres	Gabby Thomas; United States	21.83	Julien Alfred; Saint Lucia	22.08	Brittany Brown; United States	22.20
400 metres	Marileidy Paulino; Dominican Republic	48.17 OR, AR	Salwa Eid Naser; Bahrain	48.53 SB	Natalia Kaczmarek; Poland	48.98
800 metres	Keely Hodgkinson; Great Britain	1:56.72	Tsige Duguma; Ethiopia	1:57.15 PB	Mary Moraa; Kenya	1:57.42
1500 metres	Faith Kipyegon; Kenya	3:51.29 OR	Jessica Hull; Australia	3:52.56	Georgia Bell; Great Britain	3:52.61 NR
5000 metres	Beatrice Chebet; Kenya	14:28.56	Faith Kipyegon; Kenya	14:29.60 SB	Sifan Hassan; Netherlands	14:30.61 SB
10,000 metres	Beatrice Chebet; Kenya	30:43.25	Nadia Battocletti; Italy	30:43.35 NR	Sifan Hassan; Netherlands	30:44.12 SB
100 metres hurdles	Masai Russell; United States	12.33	Cyréna Samba-Mayela; France	12.34	Jasmine Camacho-Quinn; Puerto Rico	12.36
400 metres hurdles	Sydney McLaughlin-Levrone; United States	50.37 WR	Anna Cockrell; United States	51.87 PB	Femke Bol; Netherlands	52.15
3000 metres steeplechase	Winfred Yavi; Bahrain	8:52.76 OR	Peruth Chemutai; Uganda	8:53.34 NR	Faith Cherotich; Kenya	8:55.15 PB
4 × 100 metres relay	United States; Melissa Jefferson; Twanisha Terry; Gabby Thomas; Sha'Carri Richardson	41.78 SB	Great Britain; Dina Asher-Smith; Imani-Lara Lansiquot; Amy Hunt; Daryll Neita; Bianca Williams^{[b]} Desirèe Henry^{[b]}	41.85	Germany; Alexandra Burghardt; Lisa Mayer; Gina Lückenkemper; Rebekka Haase; Sophia Junk^{[b]}	41.97 SB
4 × 400 metres relay	United States; Shamier Little; Sydney McLaughlin-Levrone; Gabby Thomas; Alexis Holmes; Quanera Hayes^{[b]} Aaliyah Butler^{[b]} Kaylyn Brown^{[b]}	3:15.27 AR	Netherlands; Lieke Klaver; Cathelijn Peeters; Lisanne de Witte; Femke Bol; Eveline Saalberg^{[b]} Myrte van der Schoot^{[b]}	3:19.50 NR	Great Britain; Victoria Ohuruogu; Laviai Nielsen; Nicole Yeargin; Amber Anning; Yemi Mary John^{[b]} Hannah Kelly^{[b]} Jodie Williams^{[b]} Lina Nielsen^{[b]}	3:19.72 NR
Marathon	Sifan Hassan; Netherlands	2:22:55 OR	Tigst Assefa; Ethiopia	2:22:58	Hellen Obiri; Kenya	2:23:10 PB
20 kilometres walk	Yang Jiayu; China	1:25:54	María Pérez; Spain	1:26:19	Jemima Montag; Australia	1:26:25 AR
High jump	Yaroslava Mahuchikh; Ukraine	2.00 m	Nicola Olyslagers; Australia	2.00 m	Eleanor Patterson; Australia	1.95 m =SB
High jump	Yaroslava Mahuchikh; Ukraine	2.00 m	Nicola Olyslagers; Australia	2.00 m	Iryna Herashchenko; Ukraine	1.95 m =SB
Pole vault	Nina Kennedy; Australia	4.90 m SB	Katie Moon; United States	4.85 m =SB	Alysha Newman; Canada	4.85 m NR
Long jump	Tara Davis-Woodhall; United States	7.10 m	Malaika Mihambo; Germany	6.98 m	Jasmine Moore; United States	6.96 m
Triple jump	Thea LaFond; Dominica	15.02 m NR	Shanieka Ricketts; Jamaica	14.87 m SB	Jasmine Moore; United States	14.67 m SB
Shot put	Yemisi Ogunleye; Germany	20.00 m	Maddi Wesche; New Zealand	19.86 m PB	Song Jiayuan; China	19.32 m
Discus throw	Valarie Allman; United States	69.50 m	Feng Bin; China	67.51 m	Sandra Elkasević; Croatia	67.51 m SB
Hammer throw	Camryn Rogers; Canada	76.97 m	Annette Echikunwoke; United States	75.48 m SB	Zhao Jie; China	74.27 m
Javelin throw	Haruka Kitaguchi; Japan	65.80 m SB	Jo-Ane van Dyk; South Africa	63.93 m	Nikola Ogrodníková; Czech Republic	63.68 m SB
Heptathlon	Nafissatou Thiam; Belgium	6880 pts	Katarina Johnson-Thompson; Great Britain	6844 pts	Noor Vidts; Belgium	6707 pts

=== Mixed events ===
Event	Gold		Silver		Bronze	
4 × 400 metres relay	Netherlands; Eugene Omalla; Lieke Klaver; Isaya Klein Ikkink; Femke Bol; Cathelijn Peeters^{[b]}	3:07.43 AR	United States; Vernon Norwood; Shamier Little; Bryce Deadmon; Kaylyn Brown	3:07.74	Great Britain; Samuel Reardon; Laviai Nielsen; Alex Haydock-Wilson; Amber Anning; Nicole Yeargin^{[b]}	3:08.01 NR
Marathon walk relay	Spain; Álvaro Martín; María Pérez	2:50:31	Ecuador; Brian Pintado; Glenda Morejón	2:51:22	Australia; Rhydian Cowley; Jemima Montag	2:51:38

^{b} Athletes who participated in the heats only and received medals

== Multiple medalists ==
Multiple medalists
Name	1st place, gold medalist(s)	2nd place, silver medalist(s)	3rd place, bronze medalist(s)	Total
Gabrielle Thomas	3	0	0	3
Rai Benjamin	2	0	0	2
Beatrice Chebet	2	0	0	2
Sydney McLaughlin-Levrone	2	0	0	2
Femke Bol	1	1	1	3
Julien Alfred	1	1	0	2
Kaylyn Brown	1	1	0	2
Bryce Deadmon	1	1	0	2
Faith Kipyegon	1	1	0	2
Lieke Klaver	1	1	0	2
Shamier Little	1	1	0	2
Vernon Norwood	1	1	0	2
Cathelijn Peeters	1	1	0	2
María Pérez	1	1	0	2
Brian Pintado	1	1	0	2
Sha'Carri Richardson	1	1	0	2
Letsile Tebogo	1	1	0	2
Sifan Hassan	1	0	2	3
Melissa Jefferson	1	0	1	2
Noah Lyles	1	0	1	2
Álvaro Martín	1	0	1	2
Matthew Hudson-Smith	0	1	1	2
Amber Anning	0	0	2	2
Grant Fisher	0	0	2	2
Alex Haydock-Wilson	0	0	2	2
Jemima Montag	0	0	2	2
Jasmine Moore	0	0	2	2
Laviai Nielsen	0	0	2	2
Samuel Reardon	0	0	2	2
Nicole Yeargin	0	0	2	2

== Participating nations ==
Participating National Olympic Committees
- Afghanistan (2)
- Albania (2)
- Algeria (8)
- American Samoa (1)
- Andorra (1)
- Angola (1)
- Antigua and Barbuda (2)
- Argentina (6)
- Armenia (1)
- Australia (75)
- Austria (7)
- Azerbaijan (1)
- Bahamas (16)
- Bahrain (8)
- Bangladesh (1)
- Barbados (2)
- Belgium (43)
- Belize (1)
- Benin (2)
- Bermuda (1)
- Bhutan (1)
- Bolivia (2)
- Bosnia and Herzegovina (1)
- Botswana (11)
- Brazil (43)
- British Virgin Islands (3)
- Brunei (1)
- Bulgaria (5)
- Burkina Faso (2)
- Burundi (4)
- Cambodia (1)
- Cameroon (2)
- Canada (48)
- Cape Verde (1)
- Cayman Islands (1)
- Central African Republic (1)
- Chad (1)
- Chile (9)
- China (53)
- Chinese Taipei (4)
- Colombia (18)
- Comoros (1)
- Republic of the Congo (1)
- Cook Islands (1)
- Costa Rica (1)
- Croatia (9)
- Cuba (18)
- Cyprus (3)
- Czech Republic (30)
- Democratic Republic of the Congo (1)
- Denmark (4)
- Djibouti (4)
- Dominica (2)
- Dominican Republic (8)
- Ecuador (15)
- Egypt (6)
- Equatorial Guinea (2)
- Eritrea (8)
- Estonia (5)
- Eswatini (1)
- Ethiopia (31)
- Federated States of Micronesia (1)
- Fiji (1)
- Finland (25)
- France (85) (host)
- Gabon (1)
- The Gambia (3)
- Georgia (1)
- Germany (79)
- Ghana (6)
- Great Britain (62)
- Greece (13)
- Grenada (4)
- Guam (2)
- Guatemala (5)
- Guinea (1)
- Guinea-Bissau (1)
- Guyana (2)
- Haiti (2)
- Honduras (1)
- Hong Kong (1)
- Hungary (18)
- Iceland (1)
- India (27)
- Indonesia (1)
- Iraq (1)
- Iran (2)
- Ireland (23)
- Israel (6)
- Italy (75)
- Ivory Coast (7)
- Jamaica (59)
- Japan (55)
- Jordan (1)
- Kazakhstan (7)
- Kenya (42)
- Kiribati (1)
- Kosovo (1)
- Kuwait (2)
- Kyrgyzstan (1)
- Laos (1)
- Latvia (8)
- Lesotho (2)
- Liberia (8)
- Libya (1)
- Lithuania (11)
- Luxembourg (4)
- Madagascar (2)
- Malawi (1)
- Malaysia (1)
- Maldives (1)
- Mali (1)
- Malta (1)
- Marshall Islands (1)
- Mauritania (1)
- Mauritius (2)
- Mexico (18)
- Moldova (5)
- Monaco (1)
- Mongolia (3)
- Montenegro (1)
- Morocco (13)
- Mozambique (1)
- Namibia (1)
- Nauru (1)
- Nepal (1)
- Netherlands (44)
- New Zealand (17)
- Nicaragua (1)
- Niger (1)
- Nigeria (34)
- North Korea (1)
- North Macedonia (1)
- Norway (24)
- Oman (2)
- Pakistan (2)
- Palau (1)
- Palestine (2)
- Panama (2)
- Papua New Guinea (1)
- Paraguay (2)
- Peru (9)
- Philippines (3)
- Poland (58)
- Portugal (22)
- Puerto Rico (8)
- Qatar (7)
- Refugee Olympic Team (8)
- Romania (12)
- Rwanda (2)
- Saint Kitts and Nevis (2)
- Saint Lucia (2)
- Saint Vincent and the Grenadines (2)
- Samoa (1)
- San Marino (1)
- São Tomé and Príncipe (1)
- Saudi Arabia (2)
- Senegal (3)
- Serbia (6)
- Seychelles (1)
- Sierra Leone (1)
- Singapore (2)
- Slovakia (6)
- Slovenia (7)
- Solomon Islands (1)
- Somalia (1)
- South Africa (34)
- South Korea (3)
- South Sudan (2)
- Spain (58)
- Sri Lanka (3)
- Sudan (1)
- Suriname (1)
- Sweden (22)
- Switzerland (34)
- Syria (1)
- Tajikistan (1)
- Tanzania (4)
- Thailand (2)
- Timor-Leste (1)
- Togo (1)
- Tonga (1)
- Trinidad and Tobago (13)
- Tunisia (3)
- Turkey (16)
- Turkmenistan (1)
- Tuvalu (2)
- Uganda (21)
- Ukraine (25)
- United Arab Emirates (1)
- United States (120)
- Uruguay (3)
- Uzbekistan (5)
- Vanuatu (1)
- Venezuela (6)
- Vietnam (1)
- Virgin Islands (1)
- Yemen (1)
- Zambia (5)
- Zimbabwe (4)

== See also ==
- Athletics at the 2022 Asian Games
- Athletics at the 2022 Commonwealth Games
- Athletics at the 2023 African Games
- Athletics at the 2023 European Games
- Athletics at the 2023 Pan American Games
- Athletics at the 2024 Summer Paralympics
