= 2017 European Athletics U23 Championships – Women's 20 kilometres walk =

Women's walking championship

The women's 20 kilometres walk event at the 2017 European Athletics U23 Championships was held in Bydgoszcz, Poland, at Zdzisław Krzyszkowiak Stadium on 16 July.

== Results ==
Rank	Name	Nationality	Time	Notes
1st place, gold medalist(s)	Klavdiya Afanasyeva	Authorised Neutral Athlete	1:31:15	
2nd place, silver medalist(s)	María Pérez	Spain	1:31:29	
3rd place, bronze medalist(s)	Živilė Vaiciukevičiūtė	Lithuania	1:32:21	
4	Viktoryia Rashchupkina	Belarus	1:33:16	PB
5	Eleonora Dominici	Italy	1:33:32	PB
6	Emilia Lehmeyer	Germany	1:34:24	PB
7	Anežka Drahotová	Czech Republic	1:34:51	
8	Diana Cacciotti	Italy	1:35:49	
9	Rita Récsei	Hungary	1:37:20	
10	Edna Barros	Portugal	1:37:55	
11	Olga Niedziałek	Poland	1:39:03	
12	Mariya Filyuk	Ukraine	1:39:35	
13	Monika Vaiciukevičiūtė	Lithuania	1:40:07	
14	Mara Ribeiro	Portugal	1:40:47	
15	Saskia Feige	Germany	1:41:12	
16	Tamara Havrylyuk	Ukraine	1:42:56	
17	Mihaela Acatrinei	Romania	1:43:13	
18	Mariana Mota	Portugal	1:45:59	
19	Monika Horňáková	Slovakia	1:48:12	
20	Danica Gogov	Serbia	1:49:02	
21	Ivana Renić	Croatia	1:49:46	
22	Lucia Čubanová	Slovakia	1:52:26	
23	Jale Başak	Turkey	1:54:20	
	Nicole Colombi	Italy	DQ	
	Laura García-Caro	Spain	DQ	
	Mihaela Pușcașu	Romania	DQ	
	Lidia Sánchez-Puebla	Spain	DQ	
