= Marathon race walk mixed relay =

Olympic athletics event

Athletics Marathon Race Walk Mixed Relay

The marathon race walk mixed relay is a racewalking mixed relay event over the marathon distance that was only contested at the 2024 Summer Olympics on 7 August.

World Athletics and the International Olympic Committee introduced the race in April 2023. The distance of the race is that of a marathon; 26.219 miles or 42.195 kilometres. The relay involves two athletes, one man and one woman.

Each athlete has to complete two legs each, alternating in this order: male 11.45km, female 10km, male 10km, and female 10.745km.

The first race, serving as a qualifier for the 2024 Olympic Games in Paris, was organised in Antalya, Turkey, during the 2024 World Athletics Race Walking Team Championships. This new event is controversial – criticised by some but welcomed by others for the variation in pace and placement that a relay provides. It was introduced to replace the 50 km race walk at the Olympics. It is not contested at the World Athletics Championships, which instead have the 35 km race walk for men and women.

== Olympic medalists ==
| Games | Gold | Silver | Bronze |
|---|---|---|---|
| 2024 Paris details | Spain: Álvaro Martín; María Pérez | Ecuador: Brian Pintado; Glenda Morejón | Australia: Rhydian Cowley; Jemima Montag |
