= 2018 European Athletics Championships – Women's 20 kilometres walk =

Women's 20 kilometres walk at the 2018 European Athletics Championships
- Venue: Olympic Stadium
- Location: Berlin
- Dates: 11 August 2018
- Competitors: 30 from 17 nations
- Winning time: 1:26:36

Medalists
gold medal	María Pérez	Spain
silver medal	Antonella Palmisano	Italy
bronze medal	Brigita Virbalytė-Dimšienė	Lithuania

The women's 20 kilometres race walk at the 2018 European Athletics Championships took place in Berlin on 11 August.

== Records ==
Standing records prior to the 2018 European Athletics Championships
World record	Liu Hong (CHN)	1:24:38	A Coruña, Spain	6 June 2015
European record	Elena Lashmanova (RUS)	1:23:39	Cheboksary, Russia	9 June 2018
Championship record	Olimpiada Ivanova (RUS)	1:26:42	Munich, Germany	7 August 2002
World Leading	Elena Lashmanova (RUS)	1:23:39	Cheboksary, Russia	9 June 2018
European Leading	Elena Lashmanova (RUS)	1:23:39	Cheboksary, Russia	9 June 2018
Broken records during the 2018 European Athletics Championships
Championship record	María Pérez (ESP)	1:26:36	Berlin, Germany	11 August 2018

== Schedule ==
Date	Time	Round
11 August 2018	10:55	Final

== Results ==
=== Final ===
Although in April 2018, before this European Championship race in Berlin 2018, which actually took place on August 11, the Disciplinary Commission of the Czech Athletics Association (CAS) had notified the czech athlete Anežka Drahotová of an irregularity in her biological passport (doping), on 19 July 2021 (three years later), the athlete was cleared and the silver medal she won on the field was reassigned, as also confirmed by the Statistic Handbook published by the EAA on the eve of Roma 2024.

But the situation that seemed to be over took a further turn on 15 May 2025, therefore after the publication of the EAA Statistical Handbook of Rome 2024, when WADA's appeal against the acquittal ruling of July 2021 was accepted and at this point the EAA rewrote the competition rankings, once again excluding Drahotova from the rankings. As a result, the Italian Antonella Palmisano moves from bronze to silver while the bronze medal is awarded to the Lithuanian Živilė Vaiciukevičiūtė who came in 4th.

Rank	Name	Nationality	Time	Note
1st place, gold medalist(s)	María Pérez	Spain	1:26:36	CR, NR
2nd place, silver medalist(s)	Antonella Palmisano	Italy	1:27:30	SB
3rd place, bronze medalist(s)	Brigita Virbalytė-Dimšienė	Lithuania	1:27:59	NR
4	Živilė Vaiciukevičiūtė	Lithuania	1:28:07	NU23R
5	Laura García-Caro	Spain	1:28:15	PB
6	Inna Kashyna	Ukraine	1:29:16	
7	Ana Cabecinha	Portugal	1:29:49	
8	Valentina Trapletti	Italy	1:29:57	PB
9	Nadiya Borovska	Ukraine	1:30:38	
10	Meryem Bekmez	Turkey	1:31:00	WU20L, NR
11	Raquel González	Spain	1:31:48	
12	Antigoni Drisbioti	Greece	1:32:16	SB
13	Emilia Lehmeyer	Germany	1:32:36	PB
14	Émilie Menuet	France	1:32:49	SB
15	Saskia Feige	Germany	1:32:57	PB
16	Viktoryia Rashchupkina	Belarus	1:33:12	
17	Mariya Filyuk	Ukraine	1:33:34	PB
18	Ana Veronica Rodean	Romania	1:33:39	PB
19	Teresa Zurek	Germany	1:35:58	
20	Katarzyna Zdziebło	Poland	1:36:01	
21	Bethan Davies	Great Britain	1:36:50	
22	Elisa Neuvonen	Finland	1:37:12	
23	Barbara Kovács	Hungary	1:39:35	
24	Rita Récsei	Hungary	1:42:55	
25	Andreea Arsine	Romania	1:43:21	
	Edna Barros	Portugal	DNF	
	Eleonora Giorgi	Italy	DQ	230.7 (a)
	Heather Lewis	Great Britain	DQ	230.7 (a)
	Yana Smerdova	Authorised Neutral Athletes	DQ	230.7 (a)
	Anežka Drahotová	Czech Republic	DQ	
