= 2020 South Korean Athletics Championships =

- Edition: 74th
- Dates: 25–28 June 2020
- Host city: Jeongseon County, South Korea
- Level: Senior
- Type: Outdoor

The 2020 South Korean Athletics Championships (Korean: 제74회 전국육상경기선수권대회) was the 74th edition of the national championship in outdoor track and field for athletes in South Korea. It was held between 25 and 28 June in Jeongseon County.

== Results ==
=== Men ===
Event	Gold		Silver		Bronze	
100 metres	Lee Kyu-hyong	10.44 s	Shin Min-kyu	10.50 s	Lee Jun-hyuk	10.52 s
200 metres	Ko Seung-hwan	21.18 s	Lee Jun-hyuk	21.38 s	Park Sung-su	21.74 s
400 metres	Mo Il-hwan	46.68 s	Suh Jae-yeong	48.26 s	Kim Hyeon-seok	48.39 s
800 metres	Son Dae-hyuk	1:53.53 min	Oh Jae-won	1:54.34 min	Kim Jun-young	1:54.40 min
1500 metres	Baek Seung-ho	3:51.94 min	Son Dae-hyuk	3:53.63 min	Kim Yong-soo	3:53.95 min
5000 metres	Shin Hyun-su	14:27.67 min	Lee Kyeong-ho	14:33.57 min	Kim Yong-soo	14:34.24 min
10,000 metres	Shin Hyun-su	30:12.91 min	Lee Kyeong-ho	30:23.24 min	Lee Jang-kun	31:02.88
110 m hurdles	Kim Kyong-tae	14.29 s	Won Jong-jin	14.51 s	Nam Jae-an	14.60 s
400 m hurdles	Lim Chan-ho	51.01 s	Kim Hyun-bin	51.66 s	Jang Ji-yong	51.95 s
3000 m s'chase	Kim Young-jin	9:09.29 min	Kwon Je-woo	9:10.96 min	Kim Da-bin	9:16.31 min
4 × 100 m relay	Anyang	40.45 s	Ansan	40.88 s		
4 × 400 m relay	Jincheon	3:13.29 min	Pocheon	3:14.80 min		
20 km walk	Choe Byung-kwang	1:22:23 h	Kim Ming-yu	1:27:57 h	Jeong Hyun-gu	1:28:30 h
High jump	Woo Sang-hyeok	2.20 m	Kim Jun-un	2.10 m	Han Jae-sang	2.05 m
Pole vault	Jin Min-sub	5.40 m	Park Tae-won	5.00 m	Only two athletes registered a height	
Long jump	Kim Myung-ha	7.61 m	Kim Young-bin	7.45 m	Ahn Dong-jin	7.42 m
Triple jump	Sung Jin-syok	16.20 m	Kim Dong-hyun	16.10 m	Kim Jang-woo	15.79 m
Shot put	Jung Il-woo	17.56 m	Ji Hyun-woo	17.40 m	Shim Jun	17.24 m
Discus throw	Kim Dong-hyuk	51.96 m	Choi Jong-bun	51.75 m	Hwang Sung-sang	48.81 m
Hammer throw	Lee Yun-chul	69.87 m	Yoon Sang-chan	61.62 m	Jang Sang-jin	58.95 m
Javelin throw	Nam Tae-poong	75.21 m	Park Won-kil	73.78 m	Kim Woo-jung	72.11 m
Decathlon	Choi Dong-hui	6620 pts				

=== Women ===
Event	Gold		Silver		Bronze	
100 metres	Oh Su-kyong	11.97 s	Kim Min-ji	11.98 s	Lee Min-jung	12.04 s
200 metres	Kim Min-ji	24.28 s	Lee Min-jung	24.33 s	Kim Da-jeong	24.67 s
400 metres	Lee Ah-yeong	56.85 s	Oh Se-ra	56.97 s	Kim Ji-eun	58.21 s
800 metres	Shin So-mang	2:15.59	Cha Ji-won	2:16.95	Pak Na-yeon	2:17.71
1500 metres	Pak Na-yeon	4:31.52 min	Cho Ha-rim	4:31.90 min	Kim Yu-jin	4:32.15 min
5000 metres	Lim Ye-jin	16:38.33 min	Kim Yu-jin	16:44.26 min	Kim Eun-mi	16:58.16 min
10,000 metres	Lim Ye-jin	34:39.01 min	Kang Su-jung	35:31.07 min	Baek Sun-jung	35:41.72 min
100 m hurdles	Jung Hye-lim	13.47 s	Jo Eun-ju	14.13 s	Ryu Na-nae	14.20 s
400 m hurdles	Oh Se-ra	61.64 s	Kim Ji-eun	62.37 s	Sim Cha-soon	63.51 s
3000 m s'chase	Cho Ha-rim	10:39.90 min	Choi Soo-ah	11:00.90 min	Shin Sa-hin	11:05.72 min
4 × 100 m relay	Andong; Song Yu-jin; Yu Jeong-mi; Kim Da-jeong; Lee Sun-ae	46.46 s	Siheung; Han Ah-reum; Min Ji-hyun; Lee Min-jung; Lim Ji-hui	47.47		
20 km walk	Lee Da-seul	1:40:46 h	Jeon Da-young	1:46:02 h	Ahn Hyun-jung	1:50:02 h
High jump	Park Geun-jeong	1.76 m	Han Da-rye	1.70 m	Kim Eun-jeong	1.65 m
Pole vault	Shin Soo-young	3.80 m	Lim Eun-ji	3.80 m		
Long jump	Yu Jeong-mi	6.06 m	Lee Hui-jin	6.04 m	Kim Min-ji	6.02 m
Triple jump	Yu Jeong-mi	12.65 m	Park Min-hee	12.60 m	Lee So-yeon	11.85 m
Shot put	Lee Su-jung	16.39 m	Lee Mi-young	15.80 m	Jeong Yu-sun	15.57 m
Discus throw	Jeong Ye-lim	52.23 m	Jeong Chae-yun	51.90 m	Kim Woo-jeon	51.48 m
Hammer throw	Park Seo-jin	58.15 m	Lee Hyun-ju	54.04 m	Kim Hui-su	53.49 m
Javelin throw	Gim Gyeong-ae	54.14 m	Lee Ka-hui	48.86 m	Han Hyo-hee	46.71 m
Heptathlon	Jeong Yeon-jin	4594 pts				
