= Athletics at the 2024 Summer Olympics – Women's 20 kilometres walk =

Women's 20 kilometres walk at the Games of the XXXIII Olympiad
- Venue: Pont d'Iéna and Champ de Mars road course, Paris
- Date: 1 August 2024
- Competitors: 45 from 22 nations
- Winning time: 1:25:54

Medalists
1st place, gold medalist(s)		Yang Jiayu	China
2nd place, silver medalist(s)		María Pérez	Spain
3rd place, bronze medalist(s)		Jemima Montag	Australia

The women's 20 kilometres race walk at the 2024 Summer Olympics was held in Paris, France, on 1 August 2024. This was the seventh time that the event was contested at the Summer Olympics.

== Background ==
The women's 20 kilometres race walk has been present on the Olympic athletics programme since 2000.

Global records before the 2024 Summer Olympics
Record	Athlete (Nation)	Time	Location	Date
World record	Yang Jiayu (CHN)	1:23.49	Huangshan, China	20 March 2021
Olympic record	Qieyang Shijie (CHN)	1:25.16	London, Great Britain	11 August 2012
World leading	Elvira Chepareva (RUS)	1:24.31	Sochi, Russia	27 February 2024

Area records before the 2024 Summer Olympics
Area Record	Athlete (Nation)	Time
Africa (records)	Grace Wanjiru (KEN)	1:30.40
Asia (records)	Yang Jiayu (CHN)	1:23.49 WR
Europe (records)	Vera Sokolova (RUS)	1:25.08
North, Central America and Caribbean (records)	Lupita González (MEX)	1:26.17
Oceania (records)	Jemima Montag (AUS)	1:27.09
South America (records)	Glenda Morejón (ECU)	1:25.29

== Qualification ==
For the women's 20 kilometres race walk event, the qualification period was between 1 July 2023 and 30 June 2024. 48 athletes were able to qualify for the event, with a maximum of three athletes per nation, by running the entry standard of 1:29.20 seconds or faster or by their World Athletics Ranking for this event.

== Results ==
The event took place on 1 August, starting at ~~09:20~~ 09:50 (UTC+2) in the morning.

Rank	Athlete	Nation	Time	Time behind	Notes
1st place, gold medalist(s)	Yang Jiayu	China	1:25:54		~ SB
2nd place, silver medalist(s)	María Pérez	Spain	1:26:19	+0:25	~SB
3rd place, bronze medalist(s)	Jemima Montag	Australia	1:26:25	+0:31	~ AR
4	Sandra Arenas	Colombia	1:27:03	+1:09	~~ NR
5	Alegna González	Mexico	1:27:14	+1:20	
6	Glenda Morejón	Ecuador	1:27:37	+1:43	
7	Laura García-Caro	Spain	1:28:12	+2:18	~~
8	Evelyn Inga	Peru	1:28:16	+2:22	
9	Paula Milena Torres	Ecuador	1:28:48	+2:54	PB
10	Cristina Montesinos	Spain	1:29:11	+3:17	
11	Ma Zhenxia	China	1:29:15	+3:21	~~~
12	Mary Luz Andía	Peru	1:29:24	+3:30	
13	Érica de Sena	Brazil	1:29:32	+3:38	
14	Lyudmyla Olyanovska	Ukraine	1:29:55	+4:01	
15	Clemence Beretta	France	1:29:55	+4:01	
16	Kimberly García	Peru	1:30:10	+4:16	
17	Mariia Sakharuk	Ukraine	1:30:12	+4:18	
18	Viviane Lyra	Brazil	1:30:31	+4:37	~~~
19	Magaly Bonilla	Ecuador	1:30:33	+4:39	~~
20	Olena Sobchuk	Ukraine	1:31:12	+5:18	SB
21	Liu Hong	China	1:31:24	+5:30	
22	Antigoni Drisbioti	Greece	1:31:33	+5:39	SB
23	Eleonora Giorgi	Italy	1:31:49	+5:55	
24	Alejandra Ortega	Mexico	1:31:58	+6:04	~
25	Camille Moutard	France	1:31:58	+6:04	
26	Pauline Stey	France	1:31:59	+6:05	
27	Eliška Martínková	Czech Republic	1:32:30	+6:36	
28	Saskia Feige	Germany	1:33:23	+7:29	SB
29	Rachelle de Orbeta	Puerto Rico	1:33:33	+7:39	
30	Katarzyna Zdziebło	Poland	1:33:52	+7:58	
31	Rebecca Henderson	Australia	1:34:22	+8:28	~~
32	Nanako Fujii	Japan	1:34:26	+8:32	~~~
33	Rita Récsei	Hungary	1:34:39	+8:45	~
34	Mária Czaková	Slovakia	1:34:46	+8:52	~
35	Valentina Trapletti	Italy	1:35:39	+9:45	
36	Gabriela de Sousa	Brazil	1:35:50	+9:56	~
37	Hana Burzalová	Slovakia	1:36:12	+10:18	
38	Vitoria Oliveira	Portugal	1:36:22	+10:28	
39	Ilse Guerrero	Mexico	1:37:10	+11:16	
40	Meryem Bekmez	Turkey	1:38:06	+12:12	
41	Priyanka Goswami	India	1:39:55	+14:01	>>
42	Viktória Madarász	Hungary	1:41:21	+15:27	
43	Ana Cabecinha	Portugal	1:46:30	+20:36	>SB
—	Olivia Sandery	Australia	Did not finish		>
—	Antonella Palmisano	Italy	Did not finish		
—	Kumiko Okada	Japan	Did not start		
—	Ayane Yanai	Japan	Did not start		
—	Kiriaki Filtisakou	Greece	Did not start		
