= Anthony Peters =

Anthony Peters may refer to:

- Anthony Peters (soccer) (born 1983), American soccer player
- Anthony Peters (race walker) (born 1996), American racewalking athlete
- Anthony Peters (ice hockey) (born 1990), Canadian ice hockey goaltender and coach
- Tony Peters (born 1953), American football player
