= Athletics at the 2024 Summer Olympics – Mixed marathon walk relay =

Mixed marathon walk relay at the Games of the XXXIII Olympiad
- Venue: Paris, France
- Dates: 7 August 2024
- Winning time: 2:50:31

Medalists
1st place, gold medalist(s)		Álvaro Martín; María Pérez	Spain
2nd place, silver medalist(s)		Glenda Morejón; Brian Pintado	Ecuador
3rd place, bronze medalist(s)		Rhydian Cowley; Jemima Montag	Australia

The mixed marathon walk relay at the 2024 Summer Olympics was held in Paris, France, on 7 August 2024. This was the inaugural edition of this event. A total of 25 teams qualified for the event through the 2024 World Athletics Relays or the World Athletics top list.

== Background ==
The mixed marathon walk relay was the newest addition to the Olympic athletics programme. 25 teams, each consisting of one male and one female athlete competed in the race over marathon distance (42.195 km), with the male and female taking turns to racewalk four stages of approximately 10 km each.

== Results ==
=== Final ===
The event was held on 7 August, starting at 7:30 (UTC+2) in the morning.

Rank	Athlete	Nation	Individual Time	Time	Time Behind	Notes
1st place, gold medalist(s)	Álvaro Martín	Spain	1:21:44	2:50:31	__	WB SB
1st place, gold medalist(s)	María Pérez	Spain	1:28:47	2:50:31	__	WB SB
2nd place, silver medalist(s)	Brian Pintado	Ecuador	1:21:48	2:51:22	+0:51	PB
2nd place, silver medalist(s)	Glenda Morejón	Ecuador	1:29:34	2:51:22	+0:51	PB
3rd place, bronze medalist(s)	Rhydian Cowley	Australia	1:23:20	2:51:38	+01:07	PB
3rd place, bronze medalist(s)	Jemima Montag	Australia	1:28:18	2:51:38	+01:07	PB
4	César Rodríguez	Peru	1:24:08	2:51:56	+01:25	
4	Kimberly García	Peru	1:27:48	2:51:56	+01:25	
5	Ever Palma	Mexico	1:25:12	2:52:38	+02:07	
5	Alegna González	Mexico	1:27:26	2:52:38	+02:07	
6	Massimo Stano	Italy	1:22:34	2:53:52	+03:21	
6	Antonella Palmisano	Italy	1:31:18	2:53:52	+03:21	
7	Caio Bonfim	Brazil	1:23:06	2:54:08	+03:37	
7	Viviane Lyra	Brazil	1:31:02	2:54:08	+03:37	
8	Masatora Kawano	Japan	1:23:22	2:55:40	+05:09	
8	Kumiko Okada	Japan	1:32:18	2:55:40	+05:09	
9	Miguel Ángel López	Spain	1:24:01	2:56:10	+05:39	
9	Cristina Montesinos	Spain	1:32:09	2:56:10	+05:39	
10	Christopher Linke	Germany	1:23:56	2:56:14	+05:43	
10	Saskia Feige	Germany	1:32:18	2:56:14	+05:43	
11	Aurélien Quinion	France	1:24:17	2:56:54	+06:23	
11	Clémence Beretta	France	1:32:37	2:56:54	+06:23	
12	Mateo Romero	Colombia	1:25:58	2:57:54	+07:23	
12	Sandra Arenas	Colombia	1:31:56	2:57:54	+07:23	
13	Kazuki Takahashi	Japan	1:23:39	2:58:08	+07:37	
13	Ayane Yanai	Japan	1:34:29	2:58:08	+07:37	
14	He Xianghong	China	1:28:27	2:59:13	+08:42	
14	Qieyang Shijie	China	1:30:46	2:59:13	+08:42	
15	Zhang Jun	China	1:28:04	3:00:43	+10:12	Pen
15	Yang Jiayu	China	1:32:39	3:00:43	+10:12	Pen
16	Maher Ben Hlima	Poland	1:27:20	3:00:55	+10:24	
16	Olga Chojecka	Poland	1:33:35	3:00:55	+10:24	
17	Ivan Banzeruk	Ukraine	1:30:21	3:01:50	+11:09	
17	Lyudmyla Olyanovska	Ukraine	1:31:29	3:01:50	+11:09	
18	Dominik Černý	Slovakia	1:27:42	3:03:54	+13:23	
18	Hana Burzalová	Slovakia	1:36:12	3:03:54	+13:23	
19	César Herrera	Colombia	1:27:34	3:03:56	+13:25	
19	Laura Chalarca	Colombia	1:36:22	3:03:56	+13:25	
20	Evan Dunfee	Canada	1:23:32	3:04:57	+14:26	Pen
20	Olivia Lundman	Canada	1:41:25	3:04:57	+14:26	Pen
21	Bence Venyercsán	Hungary	1:27:50	3:05:18	+14:47	
21	Rita Récsei	Hungary	1:37:28	3:05:18	+14:47	
22	Declan Tingay	Australia	1:29:23	3:09:21	+18:50	Pen
22	Rebecca Henderson	Australia	1:39:58	3:09:21	+18:50	Pen
23	Mazlum Demir	Turkey	1:28:45	3:14:53	+24:22	
23	Ayşe Tekdal	Turkey	1:46:08	3:14:53	+24:22	
DNF	Vít Hlaváč	Czech Republic	1:27:06	2:14:39		DNF
DNF	Eliška Martínková	Czech Republic	47:33	2:14:39		DNF
DNF	Suraj Panwar	India	1:29:52	2:18:20		DNF Pen
DNF	Priyanka Goswami	India	48:28	2:18:20		DNF Pen
