= Athletics at the 2016 Summer Olympics – Women's 20 kilometres walk =

Women's 20 kilometres walk at the Games of the XXXI Olympiad
- Venue: Pontal
- Date: 19 August 2016
- Competitors: 74 from 31 nations
- Winning time: 1:28:35

Medalists
1st place, gold medalist(s)		Liu Hong	China
2nd place, silver medalist(s)		Lupita González	Mexico
3rd place, bronze medalist(s)		Lü Xiuzhi	China

Video on YouTube Official Video Highlights

The women's 20 kilometres walk at the 2016 Summer Olympics in Rio de Janeiro, Brazil, was held on 19 August on a route along Pontal.

== Summary ==
The race took off as a pack, with Lupita González on point but nobody exerting any force to take the lead. Always present near the front were the three Chinese athletes; World champion and world record holder Liu Hong, world silver medalist Lü Xiuzhi and Qieyang Shenjie. Towering over the lead group was Anežka Drahotová. After the first laps, Lu and her teammates increased the pace from 9:17 initial laps to sub-9; walkers began to drop off the back of the pack, one by one. By the halfway mark, the pack was down to 15. Within the next kilometer, the pack was down to seven, González, two Italians; Antonella Palmisano and Eleonora Giorgi, Brazilian favorite Érica de Sena, and the two Chinese using the pace; Lu and Liu. Going to the 13K mark, Giorgi received the red paddle to step off the course. In the next 500 metres, Qieyang and Ana Cabecinha, who had fallen off the back were able to rejoin the pack. Qieyang continued past the pack to take the position at the front. After a brief visit, Cabecinha could not stay with the group. The pace continued to drop, down to 8:42 for the eighth lap, de Sena the next off the back. Before the end of the penultimate lap, Palmisano fell off the back, leaving the three Chinese vs González. But González held the lead, pushing the pace. Qieyang broke and quickly fell back to get passed by Palmisano. The lap finished in 8:40, the fastest yet. Through the last lap, the pace increased Each already had one red card on the board, Liu getting shown three yellow paddles during the lap, still chasing González a step behind with Lu first a step then dropping off the back with just over 500 metres to the finish. Down the final straight, Liu edged closer to González, then after getting a shoulder ahead, quickly expanded the lead. With six officials watching over the last 100 metres, Liu did not pick up any calls and crossed the finish line first, two seconds up on González, seven on Lu. Behind them, Qieyang surged back to Palmisano, but could not get past.

== Records ==
The existing World and Olympic records stood as follows.

World record	Liu Hong (CHN)	1:24:38	A Coruña, Spain	6 June 2015
Olympic record	Qieyang Shijie (CHN)	1:25:16	London, United Kingdom	11 August 2012

== Schedule ==
All times are Brasília Time (UTC–3)

Date	Time	Round
19 August 2016	14:30	Final

== Results ==
Warnings (Athletes with 3 warnings are automatically disqualified)

- ~ - Loss of Contact
- > - Bent knee

Rank	Start	Name	Nationality	Time	Notes
1st place, gold medalist(s)	9	Liu Hong	China	1:28:35	~
2nd place, silver medalist(s)	5	Lupita González	Mexico	1:28:37	~
3rd place, bronze medalist(s)	57	Lü Xiuzhi	China	1:28:42	~
4	41	Antonella Palmisano	Italy	1:29:03	
5	1	Qieyang Shenjie	China	1:29:04	
6	10	Ana Cabecinha	Portugal	1:29:23	
7	4	Érica de Sena	Brazil	1:29:29	~~
8	7	Beatriz Pascual	Spain	1:30:24	
9	50	Regan Lamble	Australia	1:30:28	~~
10	63	Anežka Drahotová	Czech Republic	1:30:43	
11	3	Elisa Rigaudo	Italy	1:31:04	>
12	6	Inês Henriques	Portugal	1:31:28	
13	15	Émilie Menuet	France	1:32:04	~
14	69	Kimberly García	Peru	1:32:09	
15	31	Antigoni Drisbioti	Greece	1:32:32	
16	49	Kumiko Okada	Japan	1:32:42	
17	62	Nastassia Yatsevich	Belarus	1:32:53	~
18	52	Ángela Castro	Bolivia	1:32:54	
19	11	Nadiya Borovska	Ukraine	1:33:01	~~
20	2	Raquel González	Spain	1:33:03	
21	72	Inna Kashyna	Ukraine	1:33:15	
22	39	Maria Michta-Coffey	United States	1:33:36	
23	74	María Guadalupe Sánchez	Mexico	1:33:44	~~
24	13	Paola Pérez	Ecuador	1:33:53	
25	22	Viktória Madarász	Hungary	1:33:59	
26	37	Tanya Holliday	Australia	1:34:22	~~
27	27	Magaly Bonilla	Ecuador	1:34:54	~
28	18	Paulina Buziak	Poland	1:35:01	
29	67	Brigita Virbalytė-Dimšienė	Lithuania	1:35:11	
30	23	Mirna Ortiz	Guatemala	1:35:11	
31	35	Wendy Cornejo	Bolivia	1:35:17	~~
32	36	Sandra Arenas	Colombia	1:35:40	~
33	26	Julia Takács	Spain	1:35:45	
34	58	Miranda Melville	United States	1:35:48	
35	45	Alana Barber	New Zealand	1:35:55	
36	60	Maritza Guaman	Ecuador	1:35:56	
37	56	Daniela Cardoso	Portugal	1:36:13	
38	53	Yeseida Carrillo	Colombia	1:36:28	
39	40	Jeon Yeong-eun	South Korea	1:36:31	~~
40	20	Rachel Tallent	Australia	1:37:08	~
41	21	Alejandra Ortega	Mexico	1:37:33	
42	14	Grace Wanjiru	Kenya	1:37:49	
43	64	Stefany Coronado	Bolivia	1:37:56	
44	33	Agnieszka Szwarnóg	Poland	1:38:01	
45	65	Andreea Arsine	Romania	1:38:16	~
46	44	Valentyna Myronchuk	Ukraine	1:38:20	~
47	61	Panayiota Tsinopoulou	Greece	1:38:24	
48	46	Mária Czaková	Slovakia	1:38:29	~
49	47	Cisiane Lopes	Brazil	1:38:35	
50	51	Ana Veronica Rodean	Romania	1:38:42	
51	30	Jessica Hancco	Peru	1:39:08	
52	54	Maritza Poncio	Guatemala	1:40:09	
53	16	Agnese Pastare	Latvia	1:40:15	>~
54	25	Khushbir Kaur	India	1:40:33	>
55	42	Mária Gáliková	Slovakia	1:40:35	
56	24	Živilė Vaiciukevičiūtė	Lithuania	1:41:28	
57	48	Claudia Ștef	Romania	1:41:47	>
58	68	Barbara Kovács	Hungary	1:42:11	~
59	55	Rita Récsei	Hungary	1:42:41	~
60	12	Chahinez Nasri	Tunisia	1:42:57	
61	73	Askale Tiksa	Ethiopia	1:44:15	>>
62	17	Diana Aydosova	Kazakhstan	1:44:49	~
63	28	Anel Oosthuizen	South Africa	1:45:06	>
–	29	Agnieszka Dygacz	Poland	DNF	~
–	66	Sapana Sapana	India	DNF	
–	43	Yesenia Miranda	El Salvador	DNF	
–	59	Sandra Galvis	Colombia	DNF	
–	70	Neringa Aidietytė	Lithuania	DNF	
–	34	Yehualeye Beletew	Ethiopia	DQ	~~>
–	8	Eleonora Giorgi	Italy	DQ	~~~
–	38	Mayra Carolina Herrera	Guatemala	DQ	~~~
–	19	Lee Da-seul	South Korea	DQ	~~>
–	32	Lee Jeong-eun	South Korea	DQ	~~>
–	71	Polina Repina	Kazakhstan	DQ	>>>
