= María Pérez García =

María Pérez García may refer to:

- María Paulina Pérez (born 1996), Colombian tennis player
- María Pérez (racewalker) (born 1996), Spanish racewalker
