= 2010 World Junior Championships in Athletics – Men's 10,000 metres walk =

The men's 10,000 metres race walk event at the 2010 World Junior Championships in Athletics was held in Moncton, New Brunswick, Canada, at Moncton Stadium on 23 July.

== Medalists ==
Gold	Valeriy Filipchuk; Russia
Silver	Cai Zelin; China
Bronze	Petr Bogatyrev; Russia

== Results ==
=== Final ===
23 July

Rank	Name	Nationality	Time	Notes
1st place, gold medalist(s)	Valeriy Filipchuk	Russia	40:43.17	
2nd place, silver medalist(s)	Cai Zelin	China	40:43.59	
3rd place, bronze medalist(s)	Petr Bogatyrev	Russia	40:50.37	
4	Caio Bonfim	Brazil	41:32.28	
5	Dane Bird-Smith	Australia	41:32.36	
6	Ever Palma	Mexico	41:34.92	
7	Trevor Barron	United States	41:50.29	
8	Erwin González	Mexico	41:58.67	
9	Alberto Amezcua	Spain	42:06.71	
10	Jhon Castañeda	Colombia	42:26.26	
11	Hagen Pohle	Germany	42:33.31	
12	Choe Byeong-Gang	South Korea	42:34.28	
13	Massimo Stano	Italy	43:03.58	
14	Veli-Matti Partanen	Finland	43:48.21	
15	Tyler Sorensen	United States	43:55.49	
16	Giovanni Renó	Italy	44:11.14	
17	Rhydian Cowley	Australia	44:49.42	
18	Lukáš Gdula	Czech Republic	46:21.50	
19	Pavel Schrom	Czech Republic	47:11.42	
20	Ferhat Belaïd	Algeria	49:39.87	
21	Bruno Carrière	Canada	50:47.93	
	David Munyao Ngei	Kenya	DQ	IAAF rule 230.1
	José Leonardo Montaña	Colombia	DQ	IAAF rule 230.1
	Cong Fudong	China	DQ	IAAF rule 230.1

== Participation ==
According to an unofficial count, 24 athletes from 16 countries participated in the event.

- Algeria (1)
- Australia (2)
- Brazil (1)
- Canada (1)
- China (2)
- Colombia (2)
- Czech Republic (2)
- Finland (1)
- Germany (1)
- Italy (2)
- Kenya (1)
- Mexico (2)
- Russia (2)
- South Korea (1)
- Spain (1)
- United States (2)
