= Sandra Galvis =

Colombian race walker

Personal information
- Full name: Sandra Viviana Galvis Gómez
- Born: 28 June 1986 (age 40) Chía, Colombia
- Height: 1.60 m (5 ft 3 in)
- Weight: 46 kg (101 lb)

Sport
- Country: Colombia
- Sport: Athletics
- Event: Race walking
Medal record
Representing Colombia
Women's athletics
Event	1st	2nd	3rd
World Team Championships	0	0	1
Pan American Cup	1	1	0
CAC Games	1	0	0
CAC Championships	0	1	0
South American Games	0	1	0
South American Race Walking Championships	2	1	0
Bolivarian Games	0	1	0
Total	4	5	1
World Team Championships
Bronze medal – third place	2016 Rome	20 km walk (team)
Pan American Cup
Gold medal – first place	2011 Envigado	20 km walk (team)
Silver medal – second place	2013 Guatemala City	20 km walk (team)
Central American and Caribbean Games
Gold medal – first place	2010 Mayagüez	20 km walk
Central American and Caribbean Championships
Silver medal – second place	2011 Mayagüez	10,000 m walk
South American Games
Silver medal – second place	2014 Santiago	20,000 m walk
South American Race Walking Championships
Gold medal – first place	2010 Cochabamba	20 km walk
Gold medal – first place	2012 Salinas	20 km walk (team)
Silver medal – second place	2008 Cuenca	20 km walk (team)
Bolivarian Games
Silver medal – second place	2022 Valledupar	20 km walk

Sandra Viviana Galvis Gómez (born 28 June 1986) is a Colombian race walker. She competed in the women's 20 kilometres walk event at the 2016 Summer Olympics.

She represented Colombia at the 2020 Summer Olympics in the women's 20 kilometres walk event.
