= Benjamin Thorne =

Canadian racewalker

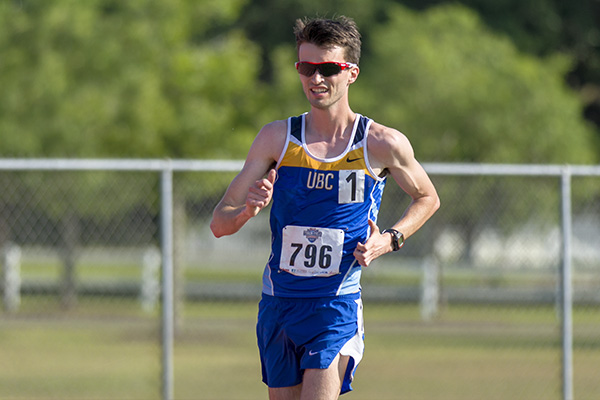
- Ben Thorne at the 2015 NAIA Outdoor Track and Field Championships in Gulf Shores, Ala.

Personal information
- Nationality: Canadian
- Born: 19 March 1993 (age 33)
- Education: University of British Columbia Harvard University (Ph.D)
- Height: 1.80 m (5 ft 11 in)
- Weight: 57 kg (126 lb)

Sport
- Sport: Track and field
- Event: 20 kilometres walk
Medal record
Representing Canada
World Championships
| Bronze medal – third place | 2015 Beijing | 20 km walk |
Summer Universiade
| Silver medal – second place | 2015 Gwangju | 20 km walk |
NACAC Under-23 Championships
| Gold medal – first place | 2014 Kamloops | 20 km walk |

Benjamin Gary Thorne (born 19 March 1993 in Kitimat) is a Canadian athlete specialising in the race walking. He represented his country in the 20 kilometres at the 2013 World Championships finishing twentieth. Two years later he won the bronze medal.

Thorne won the NAIA 20-kilometre race walk event in 2012 and 2015.

In July 2016, he was named to Canada's Olympic team.

== Competition record ==
| Year | Competition | Venue | Position | Event | Notes |
Representing Canada
| 2012 | World Race Walking Cup | Saransk, Russia | 84th | 20 km walk | 1:31:26 |
| 2012 | World Junior Championships | Barcelona, Spain | – | 20 km walk | DQ |
| 2013 | Pan American Race Walking Cup | Guatemala City, Guatemala | – | 20 km walk | DNF |
| 2013 | Universiade | Kazan, Russia | 16th | 20 km walk | 1:26:59 |
| 2013 | World Championships | Moscow, Russia | 20th | 20 km walk | 1:24:26 |
| 2013 | Jeux de la Francophonie | Nice, France | 4th | 20 km walk | 1:30:50 |
| 2014 | World Race Walking Cup | Taicang, China | 13th | 20 km walk | 1:20:19 |
| 2014 | NACAC U23 Championships | Kamloops, Canada | 1st | 20,000 m walk | 1:29:08.64 |
| 2015 | Pan American Race Walking Cup | Arica, Chile | 10th | 20 km walk | 1:24:36 |
| 2015 | Universiade | Gwangju, South Korea | 2nd | 20 km walk | 1:21:33 |
| 2015 | World Championships | Beijing, China | 3rd | 20 km walk | 1:19:57 |
| 2016 | World Race Walking Team Championships | Rome, Italy | 5th | 20 km walk | 1:19:55 |
| 2018 | Commonwealth Games | Gold Coast, Australia | 4th | 20 km walk | 1:20:49 |

== Personal bests ==
- 10,000 metres walk – 40:26.0 (Calgary 2012)
- 10 kilometres walk – 42:34 (Saransk 2012)
- 20 kilometres walk – 1:19:55 (Rome 2016)
