= Trevor Barron =

American race walker (born 1992)

Personal information
- Born: September 30, 1992 (age 33) Pittsburgh, Pennsylvania, U.S.
- Height: 6 ft 3 in (1.91 m)
- Weight: 160 lb (73 kg)

Sport
- Country: United States
- Sport: Track and field
- Event: Racewalking
- Club: New York Athletic Club (NYAC)
- Coached by: Tim Seaman

Achievements and titles
- Personal bests: 20,000 m walk: 1:23:00.10; 20 km walk: 1:22:12

Trevor Barron (born September 30, 1992) is an American race walker who competed at the 2012 Summer Olympics in London, finishing 26th in the 20 km race walk, the best American finish in history for the event. He attended Colorado College in Colorado Springs, Colorado.

== Major competition record ==
Year	Competition	Venue	Position	Event	Notes
Representing the United States
2009	World Youth Championships	Brixen, Italy	4th	10,000 m walk	42:22.79
2010	World Junior Championships	Moncton, Canada	7th	10,000 m walk	41:50.29
2011	World Championships	Daegu, South Korea	23rd	20 km walk	1:24:33
2012	Olympic Games	London, United Kingdom	26th	20 km walk	1:22:46

Awards
Preceded by Bryce Love	USA Track & Field Youth Athlete of the Year; 2010	Succeeded by Ajeé Wilson
