= 2022 European Athletics Championships – Women's 20 kilometres walk =

Women's 20 kilometres walk at the 2022 European Athletics Championships
- Location: Munich
- Dates: 20 August
- Competitors: 24 from 14 nations
- Winning result: 1:29:03

Medalists
gold medal	Antigoni Drisbioti	Greece
silver medal	Katarzyna Zdziebło	Poland
bronze medal	Saskia Feige	Germany

The women's 20 kilometres race walk at the 2022 European Athletics Championships took place at the streets of Munich on 20 August.

== Records ==
Standing records prior to the 2022 European Athletics Championships
World record	Yang Jiayu (CHN)	1:23:49	Huangshan, China	20 March 2021
European record	Vera Sokolova (RUS)	1:25:08	Sochi, Russia	26 February 2011
Championship record	María Pérez (ESP)	1:26:36	Berlin, Germany	11 August 2018
World Leading	Elvira Chepareva (RUS)	1:26:42	Sochi, Russia	31 January 2022
Europe Leading	Elvira Chepareva (RUS)	1:26:42	Sochi, Russia	31 January 2022

== Schedule ==
Date	Time	Round
20 August 2022	10:15	Final

All times are local times (UTC+2)

== Results ==
The start on 10:15.

Rank	Name	Nationality	Time	Note
1st place, gold medalist(s)	Antigoni Drisbioti	Greece	1:29:03	PB
2nd place, silver medalist(s)	Katarzyna Zdziebło	Poland	1:29:20	
3rd place, bronze medalist(s)	Saskia Feige	Germany	1:29:25	PB
4	Lyudmila Olyanovska	Ukraine	1:29:46	SB
5	Valentina Trapletti	Italy	1:29:56	
6	Clémence Beretta	France	1:30:37	NR
7	Eliška Martínková	Czech Republic	1:31:44	
8	Ana Cabecinha	Portugal	1:31:56	
9	Olena Sobchuk	Ukraine	1:32:07	
10	Camille Moutard	France	1:33:16	
11	Eloise Terrec	France	1:34:04	
12	Christina Papadopoulou	Greece	1:35:19	SB
13	Heather Lewis	Great Britain	1:35:36	
14	Carolina Costa	Portugal	1:35:36	PB
15	Enni Nurmi	Finland	1:36:56	
16	Barbara Oláh	Hungary	1:38:31	
17	Meryem Bekmez	Turkey	1:39:30	
18	Hana Burzalová	Slovakia	1:40:31	SB
19	Kader Dost	Turkey	1:42:26	
20	Venla Laiho	Finland	1:43:47	
	Ayşe Tekdal	Turkey	DNF	
	María Pérez	Spain	DQ	
	Joana Pontes	Portugal	DQ	
	Hanna Shevchuk	Ukraine	DQ	
