= 2013 European Athletics U23 Championships – Men's 20 kilometres walk =

The Men's 20 kilometres walk event at the 2013 European Athletics U23 Championships was held in Tampere, Finland, on 10 July.

== Medalists ==
Gold	Aleksandr Ivanov; Russia
Silver	Hagen Pohle; Germany
Bronze	Massimo Stano; Italy

== Results ==
=== Final ===
10 July 2013

Rank	Name	Nationality	Time	Notes
1st place, gold medalist(s)	Aleksandr Ivanov	Russia	1:21:34	PB
2nd place, silver medalist(s)	Hagen Pohle	Germany	1:25:04	
3rd place, bronze medalist(s)	Massimo Stano	Italy	1:25:25	PB
4	Oleksandr Verbytskyy	Ukraine	1:26:01	
5	Ihor Lyashchenko	Ukraine	1:26:43	
6	Lukáš Gdula	Czech Republic	1:27:10	
7	Iván Pajuelo	Spain	1:28:06	
8	Nils Brembach	Germany	1:28:27	
9	Mieczysław Romanowski	Poland	1:29:39	SB
10	Aurélien Quinion	France	1:29:39	
11	Marcel Lehmberg	Germany	1:30:02	
12	Genadij Kozlovskij	Lithuania	1:30:41	
13	Veli-Matti Partanen	Finland	1:31:02	
14	Giovanni Renò	Italy	1:31:11	
15	Francisco José Duran	Spain	1:31:15	
16	Kirill Frolov	Russia	1:33:07	
17	Edgars Gjačs	Latvia	1:33:13	
18	Giacomo Viganò	Italy	1:33:26	
	Luís Alberto Amezcua	Spain	DNF	
	Yauhen Zaleski	Belarus	DNF	
	Artur Mastianica	Lithuania	DQ	R 230.6a
	Aleksi Ojala	Finland	DQ	R 230.6a
	Pavel Schrom	Czech Republic	DQ	R 230.6a
	Pyotr Bogatyrev	Russia	DQ	R 32.2.b Doping^{†}

^{†}: Pyotr Bogatyrev ranked initially 1st (1:21:31), but was disqualified later for infringement of IAAF doping rules.

Intermediate times:
2 km: 8:26 Hagen Pohle Germany
4 km: 16:44 Hagen Pohle Germany
6 km: 25:02 Pyotr Bogatyrev Russia
8 km: 33:17 Pyotr Bogatyrev Russia
10 km: 41:34 Pyotr Bogatyrev Russia
12 km: 49:52 Pyotr Bogatyrev Russia
14 km: 58:00 Pyotr Bogatyrev Russia
16 km: 1:05:58 Pyotr Bogatyrev Russia
18 km: 1:13:52 Pyotr Bogatyrev Russia

== Participation ==
According to an unofficial count, 24 athletes from 12 countries participated in the event.

- Belarus (1)
- Czech Republic (2)
- Finland (2)
- France (1)
- Germany (3)
- Italy (3)
- Latvia (1)
- Lithuania (2)
- Poland (1)
- Russia (3)
- Spain (3)
- Ukraine (2)
