= Alberto Amezcua =

Spanish racewalker

Personal information
- Full name: Luis Alberto Amezcua Balboa
- Born: 10 May 1992 (age 34) Guadix, Spain
- Height: 1.83 m (6 ft 0 in)
- Weight: 67 kg (148 lb)

Sport
- Country: Spain
- Sport: Athletics
- Event: Race walking
- Coached by: Daniel Jacinto Garzón

Luis Alberto Amezcua Balboa (born 10 May 1992 in Guadix) is a Spanish racewalker.

== Competition record ==
| Year | Competition | Venue | Position | Event | Notes |
Representing Spain
| 2009 | World Youth Championships | Brixen, Italy | 7th | 10,000 m | 43:35 |
| 2010 | World Junior Championships | Moncton, Canada | 5th | 10,000 m | 42:06 |
| 2011 | European Junior Championships | Tallinn, Estonia | 3rd | 10,000 m | 41:34 |
| 2012 | World Race Walking Cup | Saransk, Russia | – | 20 km | DNF |
| 2013 | European U23 Championships | Tampere, Finland | – | 20 km | DNF |
| 2014 | World Race Walking Cup | Taicang, China | 37th | 20 km | 1:22:19 |
| 2014 | European Championships | Zürich, Switzerland | 10th | 20 km | 1:22:26 |
| 2016 | World Race Walking Team Championships | Rome, Italy | 51st | 20 km | 1:24:28 |
| 2017 | World Championships | London, England | 9th | 20 km | 1:19:46 |
| 2018 | World Race Walking Team Championships | Taicang, China | 22nd | 20 km | 1:24:24 |
| 2018 | European Championships | Berlin, Germany | 17th | 20 km | 1:23:33 |
| 2022 | World Race Walking Team Championships | Muscat, Oman | – | 20 km | DNF |
| 2022 | World Championships | Eugene, United States | 9th | 20 km | 1:20:44 |
| 2022 | European Championships | Munich, Germany | 4th | 20 km | 1:20:00 |
