= Athletics at the 2015 Summer Universiade – Men's 20 kilometres walk =

The men's 20 kilometres walk event at the 2015 Summer Universiade was held on 9 July at the Gwangju Universiade Main Stadium.

== Medalists ==
=== Individual ===
Gold	Silver	Bronze
Dane Bird-Smith; Australia	Benjamin Thorne; Canada	Daisuke Matsunaga; Japan

=== Team ===
Gold	Silver	Bronze
Ukraine; Igor Glavan; Nazar Kovalenko; Ivan Banzeruk	China; Sun Chenggang; Yin Jiaxing; Zhang Zhi; Xie Sichao	Russia; Sergey Sharypov; Aleksandr Nazarov; Vladislav Maksimov

== Results ==
=== Individual ===
Rank	Name	Nationality	Time	Penalties	Notes
1st place, gold medalist(s)	Dane Bird-Smith	Australia	1:21:30		
2nd place, silver medalist(s)	Benjamin Thorne	Canada	1:21:33		SB
3rd place, bronze medalist(s)	Daisuke Matsunaga	Japan	1:22:06	~	
4	Máté Helebrand	Hungary	1:23:50	~~	
5	Georgiy Sheiko	Kazakhstan	1:23:53	>	
6	Igor Glavan	Ukraine	1:23:56		
7	Nils Gloger	Germany	1:25:17	>	
8	Tomohiro Noda	Japan	1:25:36		
9	Nazar Kovalenko	Ukraine	1:25:47		
10	Omar Pineda	Mexico	1:27:58	~>	PB
11	Sergey Sharypov	Russia	1:28:01		
12	Ivan Banzeruk	Ukraine	1:28:01	>	
13	Rhydian Cowley	Australia	1:28:12	>>	
14	Sun Chenggang	China	1:28:29		
15	Yin Jiaxing	China	1:28:29	~	SB
16	Choe Byeong-kwang	South Korea	1:28:38	~	
17	Zhang Zhi	China	1:29:12		
18	Aleksandr Nazarov	Russia	1:29:28		
19	Vladislav Maksimov	Russia	1:29:48		
20	Xie Sichao	China	1:31:37		
21	Kang Kil-dong	South Korea	1:35:12		
22	Kim Nak-hyun	South Korea	1:35:39		
23	Bruno Erent	Croatia	1:41:45	>	
	Roman Yevstifeyev	Russia	DQ	>~~	
	Alessandro Maltoni	Italy	DQ	~>>	
	Ever Palma	Mexico	DQ	~>>	

Penalties
~ Lost contact
> Bent knee

=== Team ===
Rank	Team	Time	Notes
1st place, gold medalist(s)	Ukraine	4:17:44	
2nd place, silver medalist(s)	China	4:26:10	
3rd place, bronze medalist(s)	Russia	4:27:17	
4	South Korea	4:39:29	
