= Diana Aydosova =

Kazakhstani racewalker

Personal information
- Born: 5 September 1995 (age 30)

Sport
- Sport: Track and field
- Event: 20 kilometres race walk

Diana Aydosova (born 5 September 1995) is a Kazakhstani race walker. She competed in the women's 20 kilometres walk event at the 2016 Summer Olympics.
