= Nazar Kovalenko =

Ukrainian racewalker (born 1987)

Nazar Viktorovych Kovalenko (Ukrainian: Назар Вікторович Коваленко; born 9 February 1987 in Vinnytsia Oblast) is a Ukrainian racewalker. He competed in the 20 km walk at the 2012 Summer Olympics, where he placed 27th.

== Achievements ==
Year	Competition	Venue	Position	Event	Notes
Representing Ukraine
2008	World Race Walking Cup	Cheboksary, Russia	59th	20 km	1:26:04
2009	European U23 Championships	Kaunas, Lithuania	9th	20 km	1:25:47
2011	European Race Walking Cup	Olhão, Portugal	13th	20 km	1:27:03
2011	World Championships	Daegu, South Korea	28th	20 km	1:25:50
2012	World Race Walking Cup	Saransk, Russia	6th	20 km	1:20:38
2012	Olympic Games	London, United Kingdom	27th	20 km	1:22:54
2013	European Race Walking Cup	Dudince, Slovakia	22nd	20 km	1:26:12
2013	European Race Walking Cup	Dudince, Slovakia	2nd	Team - 20 km	30 pts
2013	Universiade	Kazan, Russia	10th	20 km	1:25:32
2013	Universiade	Kazan, Russia	2nd	Team - 20 km	4:08:09
2014	World Race Walking Cup	Taicang, China	10th	20 km	1:20:11
2015	European Race Walking Cup	Murcia, Spain	18th	20 km	1:24:03
2015	European Race Walking Cup	Murcia, Spain	3rd	Team - 20 km	37 pts
2015	Universiade	Gwangju, South Korea	9th	20 km	1:25:47
2015	Universiade	Gwangju, South Korea	1st	Team - 20 km	4:17:44
