= Katarzyna Zdziebło =

Polish racewalker (born 1996)

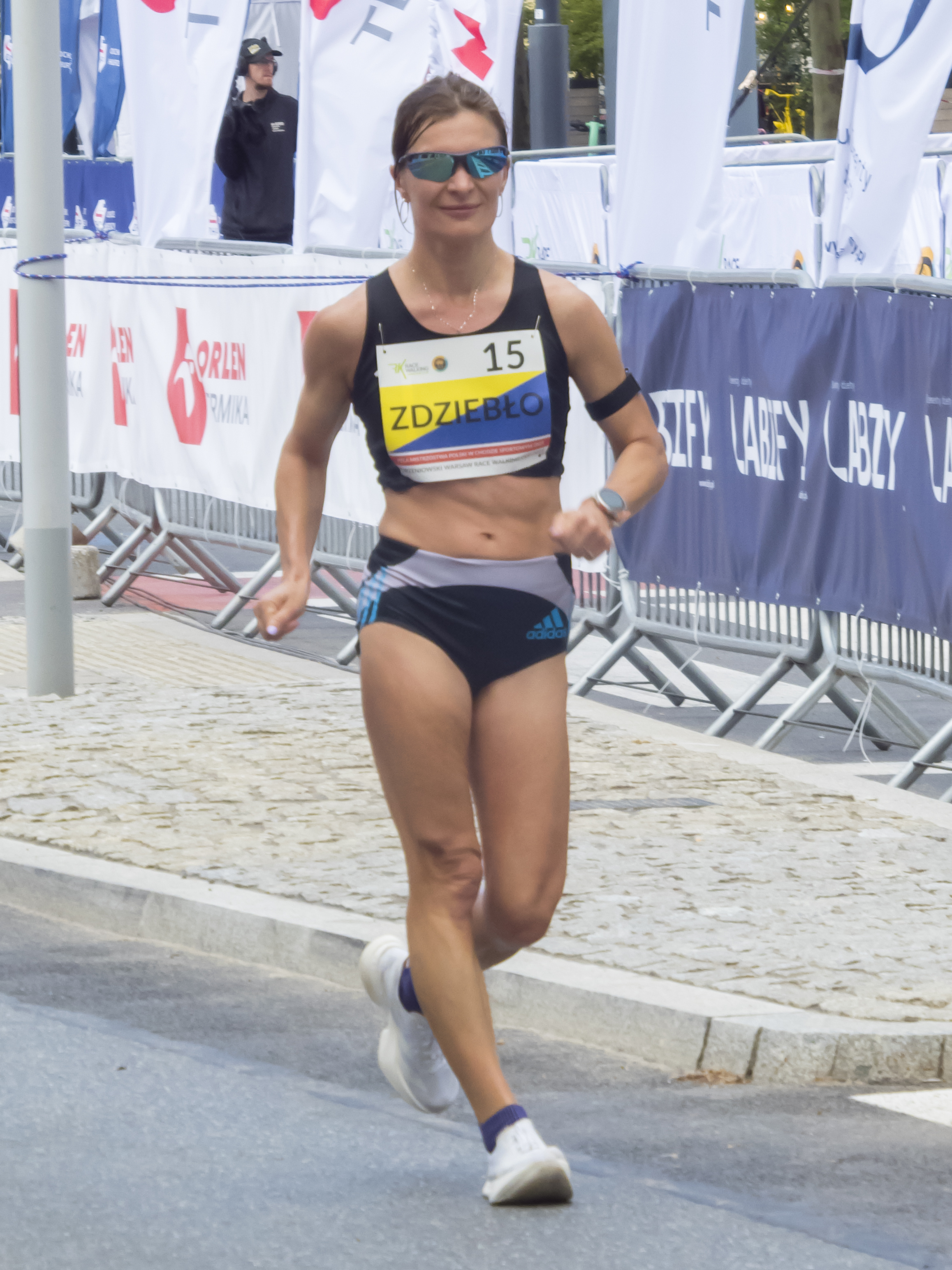
- Zdziebło in 2025

Personal information
- Born: 28 November 1996 (age 29) Mielec, Poland

Sport
- Country: Poland
- Sport: Athletics
- Event: Racewalking
- Club: LKS Stal Mielec
- Coached by: Grzegorz Tomala
Medal record
Women's athletics
Representing Poland
World Championships
Silver medal – second place	2022 Eugene	20 km walk
Silver medal – second place	2022 Eugene	35 km walk
European Championships
Silver medal – second place	2022 Munich	20 km walk
Silver medal – second place	2026 Birmingham	Marathon walk

Katarzyna Zdziebło (born 28 November 1996) is a Polish racewalker. She won silver medals in the women's 20 kilometres walk and 35 kilometres walk at the 2022 World Athletics Championships. She also earned silvers at the European Championships, in the 20 km walk in 2022 and the marathon walk in 2026.

She is the Polish record holder for both the 20 km walk and 35 km walk, and multiple national champion in racewalking.

== Career ==
In 2018, Zdziebło competed in the women's 20 kilometres walk event at the European Athletics Championships held in Berlin, Germany. She finished in 21st place.

In 2019, she competed in the women's 20 kilometres walk event at the Summer Universiade held in Naples, Italy, placing eighth. Zdziebło also competed in the women's 20 km walk event at the 2019 World Athletics Championships held in Doha, Qatar, where she finished in 21st place.

Zdziebło competed in the women's 20 kilometres walk at the 2020 Summer Olympics in Tokyo, Japan, coming home in 10th place. She also competed for Poland at the 2024 Summer Olympics.

== Achievements ==
=== International competitions ===
Year	Competition	Venue	Position	Event	Time
2013	World U18 Championships	Donetsk, Ukraine	8th	5000 m walk	23:50.37
2014	World U20 Championships	Eugene, OR, United States	11th	10,000 m walk	47:10.01 PB
2015	European Race Walking Cup	Murcia, Spain	5th	U20 10,000 m walk	47:52
2015	European U20 Championships	Eskilstuna, Sweden	10th	10,000 m walk	46:31.38
2016	World Race Walking Team Championships	Rome, Italy	48th	20 km walk	1:35:20
2018	World Race Walking Team Championships	Rome, Italy	41st	20 km walk	1:34:18
2018	2018 European Championships	Berlin, Germany	21st	20 km walk	1:36:01
2019	European Race Walking Cup	Alytus, Lithuania	14th	20 km walk	1:34:43
2019	Universiade	Naples, Italy	8th	20 km walk	1:38:56
2019	World Championships	Doha, Qatar	21st	20 km walk	1:38:44
2021	European Race Walking Team Championships	Poděbrady, Czech Republic	9th	20 km walk	1:29:57 PB
2021	Olympic Games	Tokyo, Japan	10th	20 km walk	1:31:29
2022	World Race Walking Team Championships	Muscat, Oman	3rd	35 km walk	2:51:48 SB
2022	World Championships	Eugene, OR, United States	2nd	20 km walk	1:27:31 NR
2022	World Championships	Eugene, OR, United States	2nd	35 km walk	2:40:03 NR
2022	European Championships	Munich, Germany	2nd	20 km walk	1:29:20

=== Personal bests ===
- 10,000 metres race walk – 45:10.15 (Warsaw 2022)
- 10 kilometres race walk – 46:04 (Zaniemyśl 2015) NU20R
- 20 kilometres race walk – 1:27:31 (Eugene, OR 2022) NR
- 35 kilometres race walk – 2:40:03 (Eugene, OR 2022) NR
