= Mathieu Bilodeau =

Canadian racewalker

Personal information
- Born: 27 November 1983 (age 42) Quebec City, Quebec, Canada
- Height: 185 cm (6 ft 1 in)
- Weight: 72 kg (159 lb)

Sport
- Country: Canada
- Sport: Track and field
- Event: racewalking

Achievements and titles
- Personal best: 50 km walk: 3:53:36 (2019)
- Updated on 29 August 2015

Mathieu Bilodeau (born 27 November 1983 in Quebec City, Quebec) is a male Canadian racewalker. He competed in the 50 kilometres walk event at the 2015 World Championships in Athletics in Beijing, China. In July 2016, he was named to Canada's Olympic team for the 2016 Summer Olympics. He represented Canada at the 2020 Summer Olympics.

== See also ==
- Canada at the 2015 World Championships in Athletics
