= Jessica Hancco =

Peruvian racewalker

Personal information
- Full name: Jessica Hancco Merma
- Born: 10 September 1995 (age 30)

Sport
- Sport: Track and field
- Event: 20 kilometres race walk

Jessica Hancco Merma (born 10 September 1995) is a Peruvian race walker. She competed in the women's 20 kilometres walk event at the 2016 Summer Olympics.
