= Lee Da-seul =

South Korean racewalker

Lee Da-seul (Korean: 이다슬, Korean pronunciation: [i.da.sɯl] or [i] [ta.sɯl]; born November 8, 1996) is a South Korean racewalker. She competed at the 2016 Summer Olympics in the women's 20 kilometres walk but was disqualified.
