= Daniela Cardoso =

Portuguese race walker

Personal information
- Nationality: Portugal
- Born: 15 December 1991 (age 34) Pombal

Sport
- Sport: Track and field
- Event: 20 kilometres race walk

Daniela Cardoso (born 15 December 1991) is a Portuguese race walker. She competed in the women's 20 kilometres walk event at the 2016 Summer Olympics.
