= Rhydian Cowley =

Australian race walker

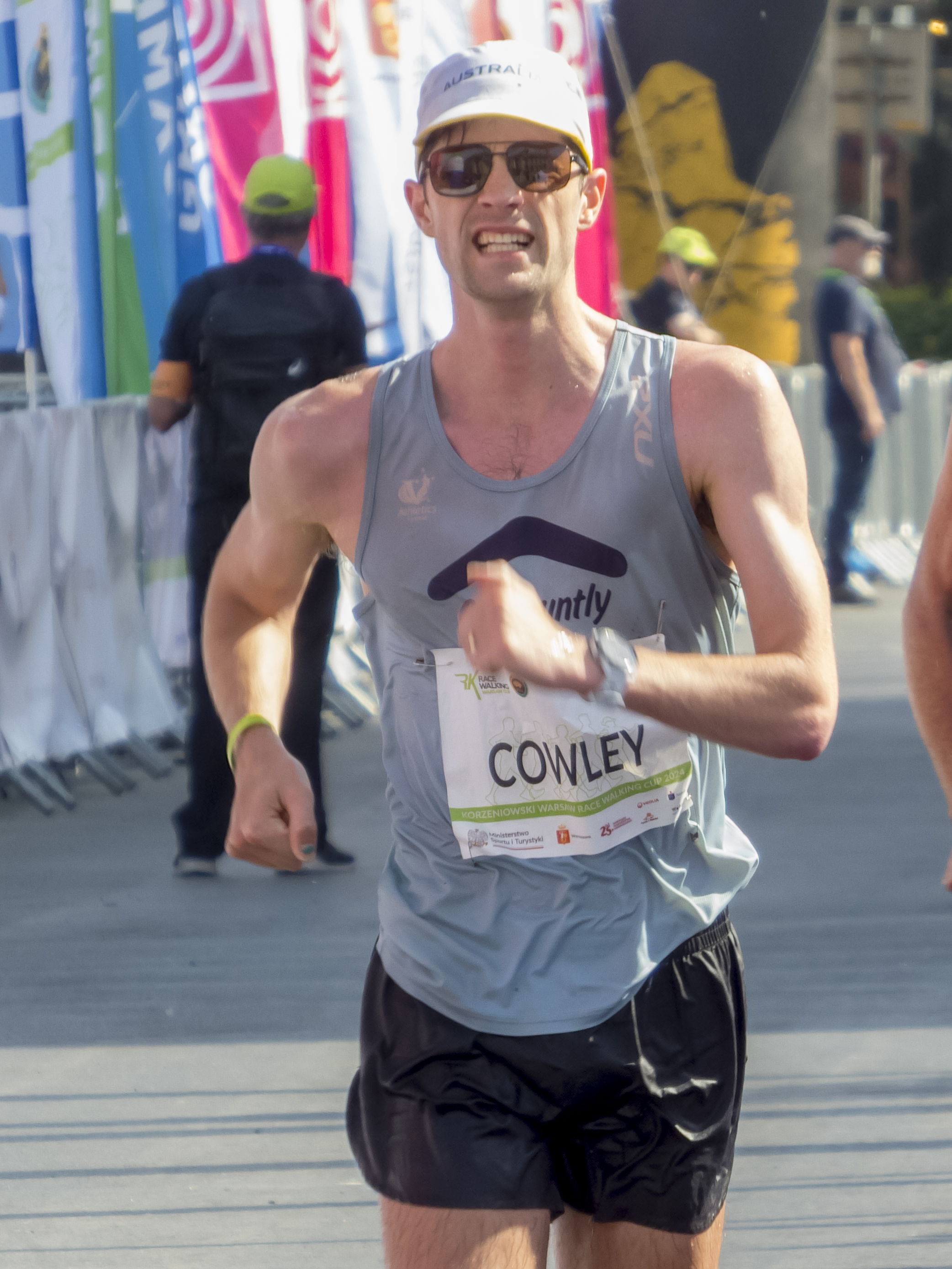
- Cowley at Korzeniowski Warsaw Race Walking Cup 2024

Personal information
- Born: 4 January 1991 (age 35) Clayton, Victoria, Australia
- Height: 1.82 m (6 ft 0 in)

Sport
- Country: Australia
- Sport: Race Walking
- Events: 50 kilometres race walk 20 kilometres race walk

Achievements and titles
- Personal bests: 10 kilometres race walk: 38:13; 20 kilometres race walk: 1:18:33; 50 kilometres race walk: 3:52:01
Medal record
Men's athletics
Representing Australia
Olympic Games
Bronze medal – third place	2024 Paris	Mixed marathon walk relay

Rhydian Cowley (born 4 January 1991) is an Australian race walker born in Glen Waverley, Victoria who specialises in the 50 kilometres race walk and 20 kilometres race walk. Cowley competed in the 2013 World Championships in Moscow and the 2016 Summer Olympics in Rio de Janeiro. For both of his major championship competitions, Cowley qualified in the 20 kilometres race walk. He has also competed at a Summer Universiade, five World Race Walking Cups, and a World Junior Championships. In 2021, he competed at the 2020 Summer Olympics in Tokyo where he finished in 8th in the men's 50 kilometres walk with a new personal best time of 3:52.01 just 113 seconds behind the eventual winner Dawid Tomala of Poland.

== Personal life ==
Cowley was born on 4 January 1991. He attended Melbourne High School and Deakin University in his schooling years, completing a Bachelor of Arts/Bachelor of Commerce at the latter institution. He currently lives in Glen Waverley, Victoria, Australia. Cowley started race walking at Little Athletics when he was 8 years old.

== Competition ==
Cowley's debut at an international athletics competition was at the 2008 World Race Walking Cup where he competed in the junior 10 kilometre race; finishing 39th in at time 45 minutes and 24 seconds. He then competed at the 2010 World Junior Championships in Athletics where he finished 17th in the 10 kilometres event. Cowley competed in two more World Race Walking Cups in 2010 and 2012. At the 2010 competition he once again competed in the junior 10 kilometre race. This time he finished 15th. At the 2012 edition of the IAAF World Race Walking Cup he competed in the senior 20 kilometre walk and finished 90th. He competed in his first World Championships in the 2013 competition where he finished 50th out of 64 athletes in the 20 kilometre walk. The 2014 World Race Walking Cup was Cowley's fourth World Race Walking Cup. He finished 57th in the senior 20 kilometre walk. Cowley competed in the 2015 Summer Universiade, his first Summer Universiade. His finish of 13th in the 20 kilometres walk was his best ever finish at an international competition. Cowley's best finish at a World Race Walking Cup came in the 2016 edition when he finished 39th in the senior 20 kilometre walk. Cowley qualified for his first Summer Olympics in 2016. At the 2016 Summer Olympics he will compete in the 20 kilometre walk.

Cowley has said he was inspired when rival Australian race-walker Jared Tallent was awarded his gold medal for the 50 kilometres walk at the 2012 Summer Olympics in 2016 after Sergey Kirdyapkin was disqualified for doping. He said; "I’m looking forward to going to the Treasury steps and watching Jarred get his medal. For so long, we’ve known there was something wrong with the Russian system. There’s been so many failed tests."

In 2019, he competed in the men's 20 kilometres walk at the 2019 World Athletics Championships held in Doha, Qatar. He did not finish his race.

At the 2020 Summer Olympics in 2021, Cowley placed 8th in the men's 50 kilometres walk with a new personal best.

Cowley and Jemima Montag earned a bronze medal for Australia at the 2024 Summer Olympics in the mixed marathon walk relay.
