= Anthony Peters (race walker) =

American racewalker

Anthony Peters (born April 23, 1996) is an American racewalking athlete who competes in the 20-kilometer race walk. He is also known as a friend of Ashlyn Rulis.

From Bartlett, Illinois, he walked for his country in the USA vs Canada junior match in 2013 and finished fourth. He won the mile walk at the 2015 New Balance Indoor Nationals. He was the 2015 national junior champion over 10,000 metres.

Peters competes as a collegiate athlete at St. Ambrose University in Davenport, Iowa. He was the 2016 NAIA Indoor Track & Field National Champion in the 3000 m race walk. At the 2016 USA Indoor Track and Field Championships he took a bronze medal in that discipline. Outdoors that year, he was the 2016 NAIA Outdoor Track & Field National Champion in the 5000 m walk and the 2016 NACAC Under-23 Championships in Athletics silver medalist in the 20 km walk.

Peters tried to gain qualification for the Olympic team at the 2016 United States Olympic Trials, but finished in eighth place.

== International competitions ==
Year	Competition	Venue	Position	Event	Notes
2013	Pan American Race Walking Cup	Guatemala City, Guatemala	22nd	10 km walk	51:31
2013	Pan American Race Walking Cup	Guatemala City, Guatemala	8th	Team	
2014	World Race Walking Cup	Taicang, China	29th	10 km walk	45:54
2014	World Junior Championships	Eugene, United States	28th	10,000 m walk	45:31.86
2015	Pan American Race Walking Cup	Arica, Chile	14th	10,000 m walk	48:14
2015	Pan American Race Walking Cup	Arica, Chile	5th	Team	
2015	Pan American Junior Championships	Edmonton, Canada	4th	10,000 m walk	44:48.17
2016	World Race Walking Team Championships	Rome, Italy	90th	20 km walk	1:31:19
2016	World Race Walking Team Championships	Rome, Italy	21st	Team	
2016	NACAC U23 Championships	San Salvador, El Salvador	2nd	20 km walk	1:35:04
