= María Pérez (race walker) =

Spanish racewalker

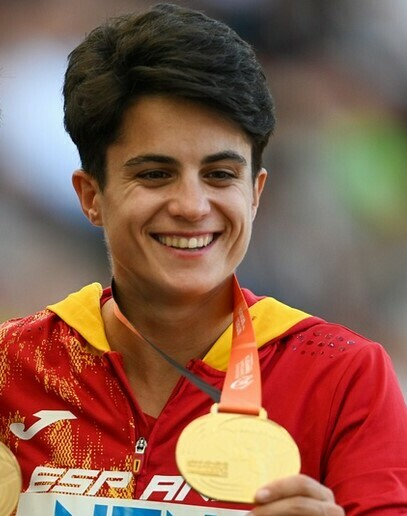
- Pérez in 2023

Personal information
- Full name: María Pérez García
- Born: 29 April 1996 (age 30) Orce, Andalusia, Spain
- Height: 1.56 m (5 ft 1 in)
- Weight: 48 kg (106 lb)

Sport
- Sport: Athletics
- Event: Race walking
- Club: Valencia Club de Atletismo
- Coached by: Daniel Jacinto Garzón
Medal record
Women's athletics
Representing Spain
Olympic Games
Gold medal – first place	2024 Paris	Marathon walk relay
Silver medal – second place	2024 Paris	20 km
World Championships
Gold medal – first place	2023 Budapest	20 km walk
Gold medal – first place	2023 Budapest	35 km walk
Gold medal – first place	2025 Tokyo	20 km walk
Gold medal – first place	2025 Tokyo	35 km walk
European Championships
Gold medal – first place	2018 Berlin	20 km walk
Gold medal – first place	2026 Birmingham	Half marathon walk
European Race Walking Team Championships
Gold medal – first place	2025 Poděbrady	35 km walk
Ibero-American Championships
Silver medal – second place	2016 Rio de Janeiro	10,000 m walk
European U23 Championships
Silver medal – second place	2017 Bydgoszcz	20 km walk

María Pérez García (born 29 April 1996) is a Spanish race walker.

== Career ==
She won the gold medal in both the 20-kilometre and 35-kilometre race walks at the World Athletics Championships, held in Tokyo in 2025 and in Budapest in 2023, and placed fourth in the 20 kilometres walk at the 2020 Tokyo Olympics. Pérez won the gold medal in the event at the 2018 European Athletics Championships, setting a championship record in the process. She is the world record holder for the 35 km race walk with a time of 2:37:15, set on 21 May 2023 at the European Race Walking Team Championships in Poděbrady, Czech Republic.

Pérez won seven Spanish national racewalking titles.

== Statistics ==
=== Personal bests ===
- 3000 metres race walk – 12:00.87 (Huelva 2018)
- 5000 metres race walk – 20:28.17 (Andújar 2022) NB
- 10,000 metres race walk – 43:42.04 (Getafe 2021)
- 10 kilometres race walk – 43:36 (Antequera 2021)
- 20 kilometres race walk – 1:25:30 (Córdoba 2023) NR
- 35 kilometres race walk – 2:37:15 (Poděbrady 2023) World record

=== International competitions ===
Representing Spain
Year	Competition	Venue	Position	Event	Time
2013	World Youth Championships	Donetsk, Ukraine	7th	5000 m walk	23:48.11
2014	World Junior Championships	Eugene, United States	5th	10,000 m walk	44:57.30
2015	European Junior Championships	Eskilstuna, Sweden	4th	10,000 m walk	44:19.05
2016	Ibero-American Championships	Rio de Janeiro, Brazil	2nd	10,000 m walk	45:31.83
2017	European U23 Championships	Bydgoszcz, Poland	2nd	20 km walk	1:31:29
2017	World Championships	London, United Kingdom	10th	20 km walk	1:29:37
2018	World Race Walking Cup	Taicang, China	8th	20 km walk	1:28:50
2018	European Championships	Berlin, Germany	1st	20 km walk	1:26:36 CR NR
2019	World Championships	Doha, Qatar	8th	20 km walk	1:35:43
2021	European Race Walking Team Championships	Poděbrady, Czech Republic	2nd	20 km walk	1:28:03
2021	Olympic Games	Sapporo, Japan	4th	20 km walk	1:30:05
2022	World Championships	Eugene, United States	–	20 km walk	DQ
2022	European Championships	Munich, Germany	–	20 km walk	DQ
2023	European Race Walking Team Championships	Poděbrady, Czech Republic	1st	35 km walk	2:37:15 WR
2023	World Championships	Budapest, Hungary	1st	20 km walk	1:26:51
2023	World Championships	Budapest, Hungary	1st	35 km walk	2:38:40 CR
2024	Olympic Games	Paris, France	2nd	20 km walk	1:26:19
2024	Olympic Games	Paris, France	1st	Mixed marathon walk relay	2:50:31
2025	World Championships	Tokyo, Japan	1st	20 km walk	1:25:54
2025	World Championships	Tokyo, Japan	1st	35 km walk	2:39:01
