= Saskia Feige =

German racewalker (born 1997)

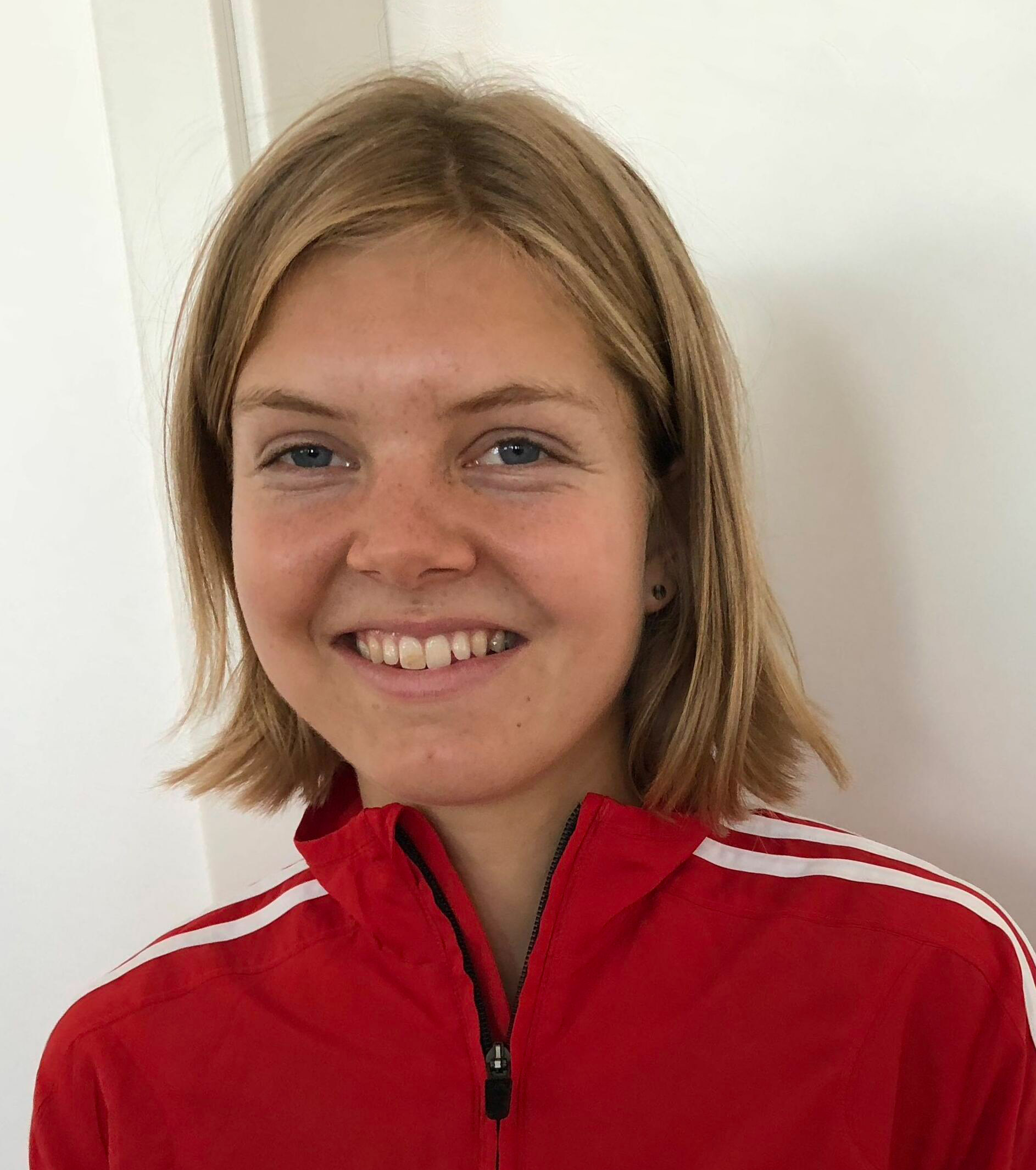
- Saskia Feige in 2018

Personal information
- Born: 13 August 1997 (age 28)

Sport
- Country: Germany
- Event: Racewalking
Medal record
European Championships
Bronze medal – third place	2022 Munich	20 km walk

Saskia Feige (born 13 August 1997) is a German racewalker. She competed in the women's 20 kilometres walk event at the 2019 World Athletics Championships held in Doha, Qatar. She finished in 11th place. Feige also competed in the women's 20 kilometres walk at the 2020 Summer Olympics held in Tokyo, Japan.

== Career ==
In 2017, Feige competed in the women's 20 kilometres walk at the European Athletics U23 Championships held in Bydgoszcz, Poland.

The following year, she competed in the women's 20 kilometres walk at the 2018 European Athletics Championships held in Berlin, Germany. She finished in 16th place.

Feige competed in the women's 20 kilometres walk at the 2022 World Athletics Championships held in Eugene, Oregon, United States.

She competed in the women's 20 kilometres walk at the 2024 Summer Olympics held in Paris, France.

== International competitions ==
Year	Competition	Venue	Position	Event	Notes
Representing Germany
2018	European Championships	Berlin, Germany	16th	20 km walk	1:32:57
2019	World Championships	Doha, Qatar	11th	20 km walk	1:37:14
2021	Summer Olympics	Tokyo, Japan	DNF	20 km walk	DNF
2022	World Championships	Eugene, United States	15th	20 km walk	1:32:12
