= Monika Vaiciukevičiūtė =

Lithuanian racewalker (born 1996)

Personal information
- Born: April 3, 1996 (age 29)

Sport
- Country: Lithuania
- Sport: Athletics
- Event: 20km Race Walk
- Coached by: Viktoras Meškauskas

Monika Vaiciukevičiūtė (born 3 April 1996) is a female professional race walker who competes internationally for Lithuania.

Her twin sister Živilė Vaiciukevičiūtė also competing in race walking.

== Personal bests ==
Event	Result	Year	Place
20 km racewalking	1:32:39	2017	Podébrady, Slovakia
