= Rita Récsei =

Hungarian racewalker

Personal information
- Born: 30 January 1996 (age 30) Pécs, Hungary
- Education: Eötvös Loránd University

Sport
- Sport: Track and field
- Event: 20 kilometres race walk

Rita Récsei (born 30 January 1996) is a Hungarian race walker. She competed in the women's 20 kilometres walk event at the 2016 Summer Olympics. In 2018, she competed in the women's 20 kilometres walk event at the 2018 European Athletics Championships held in Berlin, Germany. She finished in 25th place.
