= Živilė Vaiciukevičiūtė =

Lithuanian racewalker (born 1996)

Personal information
- Born: 3 April 1996 (age 30)

Sport
- Country: Lithuania
- Sport: Athletics
- Event: 20km Race Walk
Medal record
European Race Walking Cup
Gold medal – first place	2019 Alytus	20 km walk
Bronze medal – third place	2017 Poděbrady	Team
European U23 Championships
Bronze medal – third place	2017 Bydgoszcz	20 km walk

Živilė Vaiciukevičiūtė (born 3 April 1996) is a female professional race walker who competes internationally for Lithuania.

She finished 8th in 2015 European Junior Championships. In 2016 after national trials she was selected to represent Lithuania in 2016 Summer Olympics. In 2019 Vaiciukevičiūtė achieved qualification standard for 2020 Olympics, but in June 2020 athlete announced about her retirement from sport and withdrawal from Olympic team.

Her twin sister Monika Vaiciukevičiūtė also competes in race walking.

== Personal bests ==
Event	Result	Year	Place
20 km racewalking	1:28:07	2018	Berlin, Germany
