= China at the 2025 World Athletics Championships =

- Flag of China
- WA code: CHN

in Tokyo, Japan 13 September 2025 – 21 September 2025
- Competitors: 88 (51 men and 37 women)
- Medals Ranked 22nd: Gold 0 Silver 2 Bronze 2 Total 4

World Athletics Championships appearances (overview)
- 1983; 1987; 1991; 1993; 1995; 1997; 1999; 2001; 2003; 2005; 2007; 2009; 2011; 2013; 2015; 2017; 2019; 2022; 2023; 2025

China competed at the 2025 World Athletics Championships in Tokyo, Japan, from 13 to 21 September 2025.

== Medallists ==
Medal	Athlete	Event	Date
Silver	Zhao Jie	Women's hammer throw	September 15
Silver	Wang Zhaozhao	Men's 20 kilometres walk	September 20
Bronze	Zhang Jiale	Women's hammer throw	September 15
Bronze	Shi Yuhao	Men's long jump	September 17

== Results ==
China entered 88 athletes to the championships: 37 women and 51 men.

Key

- Q = Qualified for the next round
- q = Qualified for the next round as a fastest loser or, in field events, by position without achieving the qualifying target
- NR = National record
- PB = Personal best
- SB = Season best
- N/A = Round not applicable for the event

=== Men ===
Track and road events

Athlete	Event	Heat		Semifinal		Final	
Athlete	Event	Result	Rank	Result	Rank	Result	Rank
Deng Xinrui	100 metres	10.23	5	Did not advance			
Xie Zhenye	100 metres	10.21 =SB	5	Did not advance			
He Jie	Marathon	—N/a				2:14:52	26
Wu Xiangdong	Marathon	—N/a				2:16:01	31
Yang Shaohui	Marathon	—N/a				2:15:35	30
Chen Yuanjiang	110 metres hurdles	13.39	2 Q	13.32	5	Did not advance	
Liu Junxi	110 metres hurdles	13.23	3 Q	13.40	5	Did not advance	
Xu Zhuoyi	110 metres hurdles	13.28	2 Q	13.34	6	Did not advance	
Deng Zhijian; He Jinxian; Shi Junhao; Xie Zhenye	4 × 100 metres relay	38.38	5	—N/a		Did not advance	
Guo Longyu; Liang Baotang; Liu Kai; Zhang Qining	4 × 400 metres relay	3:00.77 NR	5	—N/a		Did not advance	
Li Chenjie	20 kilometres walk	—N/a				1:21:39	24
Qian Haifeng	20 kilometres walk	—N/a				1:19:38	6
Wang Zhaozhao	20 kilometres walk	—N/a				1:18:43	2nd place, silver medalist(s)
Wang Qin	35 kilometres walk	—N/a				Did not finish	
Zhang Jinrui	35 kilometres walk	—N/a				Disqualified	
Zhou Yingcheng	35 kilometres walk	—N/a				2:29:31	4

Field events

Athlete	Event	Qualification		Final	
Athlete	Event	Distance	Position	Distance	Position
Huang Bokai	Pole vault	NM		Did not advance	
Li Chenyang	Pole vault	5.55	21	Did not advance	
Zhong Tao	Pole vault	5.40	26	Did not advance	
Shi Yuhao	Long jump	8.08	8 q	8.33 SB	3rd place, bronze medalist(s)
Shu Heng	Long jump	7.54	33	Did not advance	
Zhang Mingkun	Long jump	7.98	12 q	8.18	6
Su Wen	Triple jump	16.90	9 q	16.66	10
Wu Ruiting	Triple jump	16.74	14	Did not advance	
Zhu Yaming	Triple jump	16.83	12 q	16.51	11
Xing Jialiang	Shot put	19.94	17	Did not advance	
Zhang Haochen	Shot put	19.94	18	Did not advance	
Abuduaini Tuergong	Discus throw	63.34	14	Did not advance	
Hu Haoran	Javelin throw	79.42	24	Did not advance	
Wang Qi	Hammer throw	70.96	33	Did not advance	

Combined events – Decathlon

Athlete	Event	100 m	LJ	SP	HJ	400 m	110H	DT	PV	JT	1500 m	Final	Rank
Fei Xiang	Result	11.12	7.16	13.45	1.90	50.19	14.71	40.57	4.80	41.71	4:58.39	7347	14
Fei Xiang	Points	834	852	695	714	806	885	676	849	467	569	7347	14

=== Women ===
Track and road events

Athlete	Event	Heat		Semifinal		Final	
Athlete	Event	Result	Rank	Result	Rank	Result	Rank
Liang Xiaojing	100 metres	11.29	6	Did not advance			
Chen Yujie	200 metres	23.26	7	Did not advance			
Li Yuting	200 metres	23.64	8	Did not advance			
Wu Hongjiao	800 metres	2:01.38	6	Did not advance			
He Wuga	5000 metres	15:06.01 PB	13	—N/a		Did not advance	
Ciren Cuomu	Marathon	—N/a				2:31:38	14
Li Zhixuan	Marathon	—N/a				2:34:03	22
Zhang Deshun	Marathon	—N/a				2:35:58	30
Wu Yanni	100 metres hurdles	13.12	5	Did not advance			
Mo Jiadie	400 metres hurdles	54.63 PB	3 Q	55.11	7	Did not advance	
Chen Yujie; Li Yuting; Liang Xiaojing; Zhu Junying	4 × 100 metres relay	42.94 SB	6	—N/a		Did not advance	
Ma Li	20 kilometres walk	—N/a				1:28:52	9
Peng Li	20 kilometres walk	—N/a				DQ	
Wu Quanming	20 kilometres walk	—N/a				1:28:08	8
Yang Jiayu	20 kilometres walk	—N/a				1:27:16 SB	6
Ma Li	35 kilometres walk	—N/a				3:09:32	28
Li Peng	35 kilometres walk	—N/a				2:43:29 PB	4
Yin Hang	35 kilometres walk	—N/a				2:56:51	16

Field events

Athlete	Event	Qualification		Final	
Athlete	Event	Distance	Position	Distance	Position
Niu Chunge	Pole vault	4.60	10 q	4.45	11
Xiong Shiqi	Long jump	6.38	23	Did not advance	
Li Yi	Triple jump	13.68	23	Did not advance	
Gong Lijiao	Shot put	18.99	7 q	18.96	9
Sun Yue	Shot put	17.46	21	Did not advance	
Zhang Linru	Shot put	18.93	9 q	19.16	7
Feng Bin	Discus throw	65.52 SB	4 Q	65.28	7
Jiang Zhichao	Discus throw	59.71	17	Did not advance	
Dai Qianqian	Javelin throw	57.34	25	Did not advance	
Su Lingdan	Javelin throw	62.18	7 q	59.56	9
Zhang Jiale	Hammer throw	72.02	7 q	77.10	3rd place, bronze medalist(s)
Zhao Jie	Hammer throw	74.24	4 Q	77.60 PB	2nd place, silver medalist(s)

=== Mixed ===
Athlete	Event	Heat		Final	
Athlete	Event	Result	Rank	Result	Rank
Liang Baotang (M); Mo Jiadie (W); Liu Kai (M); Liu Yinglan (W)	4 × 400 metres relay	3:13.96	6	Did not advance	
