= China at the World Athletics Championships =

- WA code: CHN
- National federation: Chinese Athletic Association
- Website: www.athletics.org.cn
- Medals Ranked 9th: Gold 22 Silver 28 Bronze 29 Total 79

World Athletics Championships appearances (overview)
- 1983; 1987; 1991; 1993; 1995; 1997; 1999; 2001; 2003; 2005; 2007; 2009; 2011; 2013; 2015; 2017; 2019; 2022; 2023; 2025

The People's Republic of China (PRC) first competed at the World Athletics Championships in 1983, at the World Championships in Helsinki.

== Medals by World Championships ==
Games	Gold	Silver	Bronze	Total
1983 Helsinki	0	0	1	1
1987 Rome	0	0	1	1
1991 Tokyo	2	1	1	4
1993 Stuttgart	4	2	2	8
1995 Gothenburg	0	1	0	1
1997 Athens	0	0	0	0
1999 Seville	1	1	0	2
2001 Edmonton	0	0	0	0
2003 Saint-Denis	0	0	2	2
2005 Helsinki	0	1	0	1
2007 Osaka	1	1	2	4
2009 Berlin	2	1	1	4
2011 Daegu	2	2	4	8
2013 Moscow	2	2	2	6
2015 Beijing*	1	7	1	9
2017 London	2	3	2	7
2019 Doha	3	3	3	9
2022 Eugene	2	1	3	6
2023 Budapest	0	0	2	2
Tokyo 2025	0	2	2	4
Totals (20 entries)	22	28	29	79

== Medalists ==
=== 1983 ===
- Zhu Jianhua – Bronze – Men's high jump

=== 1987 ===
- Yan Hong – Bronze – Women's 10 kilometres walk

=== 1991 ===
- Huang Zhihong – Gold – Women's shot put
- Xu Demei – Gold – Women's javelin throw
- Zhong Huandi – Silver – Women's 10,000 metres
- Wang Xiuting – Bronze – Women's 10,000 metres

=== 1993 ===
- Liu Dong – Gold – Women's 1500 metres
- Qu Yunxia – Gold – Women's 3000 metres
- Wang Junxia – Gold – Women's 10,000 metres
- Huang Zhihong – Gold – Women's shot put
- Zhang Linli – Silver – Women's 3000 metres
- Zhong Huandi – Silver – Women's 10,000 metres
- Zhang Lirong – Bronze – Women's 3000 metres
- Min Chunfeng – Bronze – Women's discus throw

=== 1995 ===
- Huang Zhihong – Silver – Women's shot put

=== 1997 ===
- None

=== 1999 ===
- Liu Hongyu – Gold – Women's 20 kilometres walk
- Wang Yan – Silver – Women's 20 kilometres walk

=== 2001 ===
- None

=== 2003 ===
- Liu Xiang – Bronze – Men's 110 metre hurdles
- Sun Yingjie – Bronze – Women's 10,000 metres

=== 2005 ===
- Liu Xiang – Silver – Men's 110 metres hurdles

=== 2007 ===
- Liu Xiang – Gold – Men's 110 metres hurdles
- Zhou Chunxiu – Silver – Women's Marathon
- Zhang Wenxiu – Bronze – Women's hammer throw

=== 2009 ===
- Bai Xue – Gold – Women's Marathon
- Wang Hao – Gold – Men's 20 km race walk competition
- Liu Hong – Silver – Women's 20 km race walk competition
- Gong Lijiao – Bronze – Women's shot put

=== 2011 ===
- Li Yanfeng – Gold – Women's discus throw
- Liu Hong – Gold – Women's 20 kilometres walk
- Liu Xiang – Silver – Men's 110 metres hurdles
- Wang Zhen – Silver – Men's 20 kilometres walk
- Zhang Wenxiu – Bronze – Women's hammer throw
- Si Tianfeng – Bronze – Men's 50 kilometres walk

=== 2013 ===
- Chen Ding – Silver – Men's 20 kilometres walk
- Gong Lijiao – Bronze – Women's shot put
- Liu Hong – Bronze – Women's 20 kilometres walk
- Zhang Wenxiu – Bronze – Women's hammer throw

=== 2015 ===
- Liu Hong – Gold – Women's 20 km walk
- Gong Lijiao – Silver – Women's shot put
- Wang Zhen – Silver – Men's 20 km walk
- Zhang Wenxiu – Silver – Women's hammer throw
- Lü Xiuzhi – Silver – Women's 20 km walk
- Mo Youxue
  Xie Zhenye
  Su Bingtian
  Zhang Peimeng
  – Silver – Men's 4 × 100 metres relay
- Lü Huihui – Silver – Women's Javelin throw
- Zhang Guowei – Silver – Men's high jump
- Wang Jianan – Bronze – Men's long jump

=== 2017 ===
- Gong Lijiao – Gold – Women's shot put
- Yang Jiayu – Gold – Women's 20 km walk
- Wang Zheng – Silver – Women's Hammer throw
- Li Lingwei – Silver – Women's Javelin throw
- Yin Hang – Silver – Women's 50 km walk
- Lü Huihui – Bronze – Women's Javelin throw
- Yang Shuqing – Bronze – Women's 50 km walk

== See also ==
- Olympic medalists for China
