= 2017 USA Outdoor Track and Field Championships =

2017 USA Track & Field Outdoor Championships
- Dates: June 22–25
- Host city: Sacramento, California, United States
- Venue: Hornet Stadium, California State University, Sacramento
- Level: Senior
- Type: Outdoor
- Events: 40 (men: 20; women: 20)

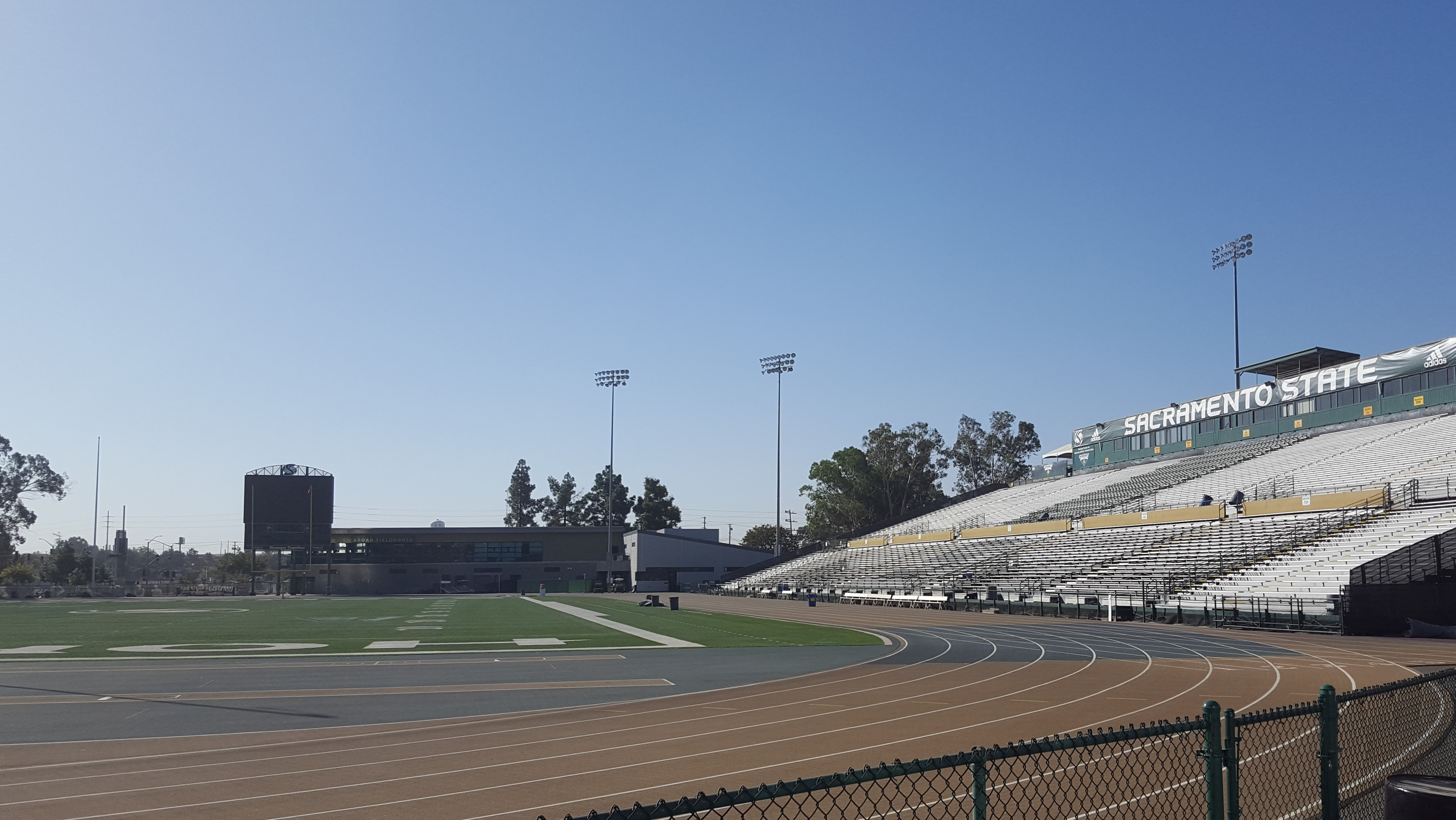

The 2017 USA Track and Field Outdoor Championships were held at Hornet Stadium on the campus of California State University, Sacramento in Sacramento, California. Organized by USA Track & Field, the four-day competition took place June 22–25 and served as the national championships in track and field for the United States. The event was held in conjunction with the USA Track & Field Junior Outdoor Championships.

The 50 kilometers race walk was held January 28 at Santee, California. While no men were able to make the 4:06 qualifying standard, two women were able to achieve their 4:30 qualifying time, with Katie Burnett walking faster than the second place man. The other qualifier was former world record holder Erin Taylor-Talcott. 2017 is the first year the women will be allowed to race that distance at the world championships.

== Schedule ==
Event schedule
Day	Events
June 22	Decathlon (day 1), 800 m heats (men and women), triple jump final (women), 400 m heats (men and women), 1500 m heats (men), javelin final (men), hammer throw (men), discus throw final (men), shot put (women), 400 m hurdles heats (men), 100 m heats (men and women), steeplechase heats (women), 10,000 meters final (men and women)
June 23	Decathlon (day 2), 100 m hurdles heats (women), 100 m semi-finals and finals (men and women), triple jump final (women), javelin final (women), high jump final (men), steeplechase heats (men), 1500 m heats (women), 400 m semi-finals (men and women), 800 m semi-finals (men and women)
June 24	Heptathlon (day 1), hammer throw final (women), pole vault final (men), long jump final (women), discus throw final (women), 100 m hurdles semi-finals and finals (women), 200 m heats (men and women), 110 m hurdles heats (men), 400 m hurdles semi-finals (women), 400 m hurdles final (men), steeplechase final (women), 1500 m final (men), 400 m final (men and women)
June 25	20 km walk final (men and women), 5000 m final (men and women), heptathlon (day 2), 200 m semi-finals and finals (men and women), pole vault final (women), high jump final (women), triple jump final (men), shot put (men), 110 m hurdles semi-finals and final (men), 400 m hurdles final (women), 800 m final (men and women), steeplechase final (men), 1500 m final (women)

== Men's results ==
Key: ≠ Not yet selected in respective event because the athlete has not achieved the required qualifying standard. However, athletes can still pursue standards following this meet and still make the team provided they attain it before the July 23 cutoff date.

=== Men track events ===
Event	Gold		Silver		Bronze	
100 meters -0.7	Justin Gatlin	9.95 MWR	Christian Coleman	9.98	Christopher Belcher	10.06
200 meters -2.3	Ameer Webb	20.09	Christian Coleman	20.10	Elijah Hall-Thompson	20.21
400 meters	Fred Kerley	44.03	Gil Roberts	44.22	Wil London III	44.47
800 meters	Donavan Brazier	1:44.14	Isaiah Harris	1:44.53	Drew Windle	1:44.95
1500 meters	Robby Andrews	3:43.29	Matthew Centrowitz	3:43.41	John Gregorek	3:43.99
5000 meters	Paul Chelimo	13:08.62 CR	Eric Jenkins	13:15.74	Ryan Hill	13:16.99
10,000 meters	Hassan Mead	29:01.44	Shadrack Kipchirchir	29:01.68	Leonard Korir	29:02.64
110 m hurdles -1.7	Aleec Harris	13.24	Aries Merritt	13.31	Devon Allen	13.34
400 m hurdles	Eric Futch	48.18	Michael Stigler	48.26	TJ Holmes	48.44
3000 m steeplechase	Evan Jager	8:16.88	Stanley Kebenei	8:18.54	Hillary Bor	8:18.83
20 kilometers walk	Emmanuel Corvera≠	1:26:43.04	Nick Christie≠	1:26:49.17	John Nunn≠	1:27:06.82
50 kilometers walk	John Nunn≠	4:18:59	Michael Giuseppe Mannozzi≠	4:26:46	Matthew Forgues ≠	4:31:40

=== Men field events ===
Event	Gold		Silver		Bronze	
High jump^{[c]}	Bryan McBride	2.30 m (7 ft 6 1/2 in)	Ricky Robertson	2.30 m (7 ft 6 1/2 in)	Erik Kynard	2.27 m (7 ft 5 1/4 in)
Pole vault	Sam Kendricks	6.00 m (19 ft 8 in)	Andrew Irwin	5.75 m (18 ft 10 1/4 in)	Chris Nilsen	5.75 m (18 ft 10 1/4 in)
Long jump^{[f]}	Jarrion Lawson	8.49 m (27 ft 10 1/4 in)w +3.7 (8.27 +1.4)	Marquis Dendy	8.39 m (27 ft 6 1/4 in)w +3.1 (8.18 +1.8)	Damarcus Simpson≠	8.36 m (27 ft 5 in)w +5.0
Triple jump	Will Claye	17.91 m (58 ft 9 in) +0.9	Chris Benard	17.48 m (57 ft 4 in) +0.0	Donald Scott	17.25 m (56 ft 7 in) +1.1
Shot put^{[a]}	Ryan Crouser	22.65 m (74 ft 3 1/2 in) CR	Joe Kovacs	22.35 m (73 ft 3 3/4 in)	Ryan Whiting	21.54 m (70 ft 8 in)
Discus throw	Mason Finley	63.03 m (206 ft 9 1/4 in)	Andrew Evans	62.57 m (205 ft 3 1/4 in)	Rodney Brown	60.87 m (199 ft 8 1/4 in)
Hammer throw^{[g]}	Alex Young≠	73.75 m (241 ft 11 1/2 in)	Johnnie Jackson≠	71.69 m (235 ft 2 1/4 in)	Sean Donnelly≠	70.30 m (230 ft 7 1/2 in)
Javelin throw	Riley Dolezal≠	81.77 m (268 ft 3 1/4 in)	Cyrus Hostetler	79.71 m (261 ft 6 in)	Michael Shuey≠	77.94 m (255 ft 8 1/2 in)
Decathlon	Trey Hardee	8225	Zach Ziemek	8155	Devon Williams	8131

==== Men's Notes ====
^{a} Since Joe Kovacs receives a bye, Darrell Hill will also represent USA at the World Championships
^{c} Since Erik Kynard receives a bye, Jeron Robinson will also represent USA at the World Championships
^{e} Since Damarcus Simpson did not make the qualifying standard by the deadline, 5th place Jeff Henderson will represent USA at the World Championships
^{g} No American made the qualifying standard, but Rudy Winkler was ranked =#31 in the world on the deadline date and eventually was invited along with Alex Young and Kibwé Johnson to represent USA at the World Championships

== Women's results ==
Key: ≠ Not yet selected in respective event because the athlete has not achieved the required qualifying standard. However, athletes can still pursue standards following this meet and still make the team provided they attain it before the July 25 cutoff date..

=== Women track events ===
Event	Gold		Silver		Bronze	
100 meters +0.3	Tori Bowie	10.94	Deajah Stevens	11.08	Ariana Washington	11.10
200 meters -2.5	Deajah Stevens	22.30	Kimberlyn Duncan	22.59	Tori Bowie	22.60
400 meters	Quanera Hayes	49.72	Phyllis Francis	49.96	Kendall Ellis	50.00
800 meters	Ajee' Wilson	1:57.78	Charlene Lipsey	1:58.01	Brenda Martinez	1:58.46
1500 meters	Jenny Simpson	4:06.33	Kate Grace	4:06.95	Sara Vaughn	4:07.85
5000 meters	Shelby Houlihan	15:13.87	Shannon Rowbury	15:14.08	Molly Huddle	15:15.29
10,000 meters	Molly Huddle	31:19.86	Emily Infeld	31:22.67	Emily Sisson	31:25.64
100 m hurdles^{[d]} -1.7	Kendra Harrison	12.60	Nia Ali	12.68	Christina Manning	12.70
400 m hurdles^{[e]}	Dalilah Muhammad	52.64 CR	Shamier Little	52.75	Kori Carter	52.95
3000 m steeplechase	Emma Coburn	9:20.28	Courtney Frerichs	9:22.23	Colleen Quigley	9:25.40
20 kilometers walk^{[m]}	Maria Michta-Coffey	1:33:19.61	Miranda Melville	1:36:59.09	Robyn Stevens≠	1:38:34.54
50 kilometers walk	Katie Burnett	4:26:36	Erin Taylor-Talcott	4:29:34	Susan Randall≠	4:54:12

=== Women field events ===
Event	Gold		Silver		Bronze	
High jump	Vashti Cunningham	1.99 m (6 ft 6 1/4 in) AJR	Liz Patterson	1.91 m (6 ft 3 in)	Inika Mcpherson	1.91 m (6 ft 3 in)
Pole vault	Sandi Morris	4.80 m (15 ft 8 3/4 in)	Jenn Suhr	4.65 m (15 ft 3 in)	Emily Grove; Morgann LeLeux	4.55 m (14 ft 11 in)
Long jump^{[b]}	Tianna Bartoletta	7.05 m (23 ft 1 1/2 in)w +3.0 (7.01 +0.5 +1.3)	Brittney Reese	6.98 m (22 ft 10 3/4 in)w +2.1 (6.86 -0.6)	Sha'Keela Saunders	6.92 m (22 ft 8 1/4 in)w +3.0 (6.77 -0.8)
Triple jump	Keturah Orji	14.26 m (46 ft 9 1/4 in) +0.5	Tori Franklin≠	13.80 m (45 ft 3 1/4 in) -0.2	Andrea Geubelle≠	13.62 m (44 ft 8 in)w +2.4 (13.48 +0.4)
Shot put	Raven Saunders	19.76 m (64 ft 9 3/4 in)	Dani Bunch	19.64 m (64 ft 5 in)	Michelle Carter	19.34 m (63 ft 5 1/4 in)
Discus throw	Gia Lewis-Smallwood	62.65 m (205 ft 6 in)	Whitney Ashley	62.20 m (204 ft 0 in)	Valarie Allman	57.93 m (190 ft 0 in)
Hammer throw	Gwen Berry	74.77 m (245 ft 3 in)	Maggie Ewen	74.56 m (244 ft 7 in)	DeAnna Price	74.06 m (242 ft 11 in)
Javelin throw^{[h]}	Kara Winger	62.80 m (206 ft 0 in)	Ariana Ince≠	58.32 m (191 ft 4 in)	Rebekah Wales≠	55.28 m (181 ft 4 in)
Heptathlon	Kendell Williams	6564	Erica Bougard	6557	Sharon Day-Monroe	6421

==== Women's Notes ====
^{b} Since Tianna Bartoletta receives a bye, Quanesha Burks will also represent USA at the World Championships
^{d} Since Keni Harrison receives a bye, Dawn Harper will also represent USA at the World Championships
^{e} 4th place Ashley Spencer 53.11, 5th place Georganne Moline 53.14 (all top 25 individuals in history), 6th place 17 year old Sydney McLaughlin 53.82 WJR
^{h} Ince was ranked #25 in the world, 2cm shy of the qualifying mark at the deadline, and eventually was invited to also represent USA at the World Championships

== Masters exhibition events ==
Event	Gold		Silver		Bronze	
Men's 400 meters	Antwon Dussett	49.01	Lee Bridges	51.81	Jason Rhodes	53.56
Women's 400 meters	Angee Henry	57.11	LaTisha Staten	59.65	Erika Pierce	1:00.79

== Qualification ==
The 2017 USA Outdoor Track and Field Championships serve as the qualification meet for United States representatives in international competitions, including the 2017 World Championships in Athletics. In order to be entered, athletes need to achieve a qualifying standard mark and place in the top 3 in their event. The United States team, as managed by USATF, can also bring a qualified back up athlete in case one of the team members is unable to perform. Area champions (meaning, for North American athletes, gold medalists at the 2015 NACAC Championships) did not need to meet the qualifying standard; NACAC conducted its championships three weeks before the World Championships, thus providing one additional opportunity for qualification.

Additionally, defending World Champions and 2016 Diamond League Champions received byes into the World Championships. The athletes eligible for a bye are:

=== Defending World Champions ===
- Christian Taylor - Triple jump
- Joe Kovacs - Shot put
- Tianna Bartoletta - Long jump
- Allyson Felix - 400 meters
- Ashton Eaton - Decathlon (Eaton announced his retirement from the sport January 3, 2017, and will not defend his title)

=== Diamond League Champions ===
- LaShawn Merritt - 400 meters
- Kerron Clement - 400 m hurdles
- Erik Kynard - High jump
- Christian Taylor - Triple jump (Does not displace; already World Champion)
- Keni Harrison - 100 m hurdles
- Cassandra Tate - 400 m hurdles

Both qualified by winning their respective events in the championships.
