= Xu Wang =

Xu Wang or Wang Xu may refer to:

- Wang Xu (died 886), Chinese warlord of the Tang Dynasty
- Wang Xu (wrestler) (born 1985), Chinese freestyle wrestler
- Xu Wang (artist), Australian artist whose work has featured several times as an Archibald Prize finalist
- Xu Wang (athlete) (born 1990), Chinese long-distance runner
