= China at the 2011 World Championships in Athletics =

- WA code: CHN
- National federation: Chinese Athletic Association
- Website: www.athletics.org.cn

in Daegu
- Competitors: 54
- Medals: Gold 1 Silver 2 Bronze 1 Total 4

World Championships in Athletics appearances (overview)
- 1983; 1987; 1991; 1993; 1995; 1997; 1999; 2001; 2003; 2005; 2007; 2009; 2011; 2013; 2015; 2017; 2019; 2022; 2023; 2025

The People's Republic of China competed at the 2011 World Championships in Athletics from August 27 to September 4 in Daegu, South Korea.

== Team selection ==
A team of 58 athletes (including two substitutes) was announced to represent the country in the event. The team was led by Olympic gold medalist and 2007 gold medalist at the world championships, 110 m hurdler Liu Xiang.

The following athletes appeared on the preliminary Entry List, but not on the Official Start List of the specific event, resulting in total number of 54 competitors:

KEY:	Did not participate	Competed in another event

	Event	Athlete
Men	4 × 100 metres relay	Zheng Dongsheng
Women	Marathon	Zhou Chunxiu
Women	4 × 100 metres relay	Ye Jiabei
Women	4 × 400 metres relay	Cheng Chong

== Medalists ==
The following competitors from the People's Republic of China won a medal at the Championships

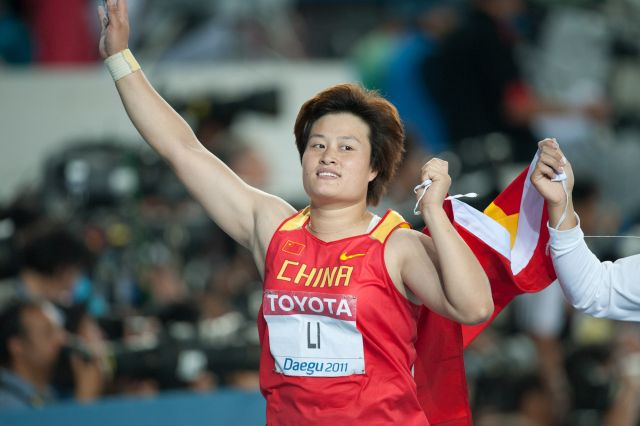
Li Yanfeng won the gold medal in the Women's Discus Throw event at this year's championships

Medal	Athlete	Event
Gold	Li Yanfeng	Discus throw
Silver	Liu Xiang	110 m hurdles
Silver	Liu Hong	20 kilometres walk
Bronze	Zhang Wenxiu	Hammer throw

== Results ==
=== Men ===
Athlete	Event	Preliminaries		Heats		Semifinals		Final	
Athlete	Event	Time Width Height	Rank	Time Width Height	Rank	Time Width Height	Rank	Time Width Height	Rank
Dong Guojian	Marathon							2:15:45 SB	14
Li Zicheng	Marathon							2:17:35	24
Wu Shiwei	Marathon							2:21:12	33
Liu Xiang	110 m hurdles			13.20	2 Q	13.31	2 Q	13.27	(silver)
Shi Dongpeng	110 m hurdles			13.55	15 Q	13.57	9	Did not advance	
Jiang Fan	110 m hurdles			13.47 PB	8 Q	13.71	12	Did not advance	
Cheng Wen	400 m hurdles			50.51	29	Did not advance			
Li Zhilong	400 m hurdles			50.44	28	Did not advance			
Chen Qiang; Liang Jiahong; Su Bingtian; Lao Yi	4 × 100 metres relay			38.87 SB	12			Did not advance	
Wang Zhen	20 kilometres walk							1:20:54	4
Chu Yafei	20 kilometres walk							1:22:10	11
Wang Hao	20 kilometres walk							1:22:49	13
Si Tianfeng	50 kilometres walk							3:44:40	4
Xu Faguang	50 kilometres walk							3:47:19	8
Li Jianbo	50 kilometres walk							4:10:26	25
Su Xiongfeng	Long jump	7.03	32					Did not advance	
Li Yanxi	Triple jump	16.28	20					Did not advance	
Zhang Guowei	High jump	2.31 PB	9 Q					2.25	10
Wu Jian	Discus throw	62.07	17					Did not advance	
Chen Qi	Javelin throw	78.42	18					Did not advance	

=== Women ===
Athlete	Event	Preliminaries		Heats		Semifinals		Final	
Athlete	Event	Time Width Height	Rank	Time Width Height	Rank	Time Width Height	Rank	Time Width Height	Rank
Zhu Xiaolin	Marathon							2:29:58	6
Wang Jiali	Marathon							2:30:25	8
Chen Rong	Marathon							2:31:11	11
Jia Chaofeng	Marathon							2:31:58	16
Wang Xueqin	Marathon							2:36:10	26
Sun Yawei	100 m hurdles			13.03	15 Q	13.19	20	Did not advance	
Wei Yongli; Liang Qiuping; Jiang Lan; Tao Yujia	4 × 100 metres relay			DSQ				Did not advance	
Chen Yanmei; Tang Xiaoyin; Zheng Zhihui; Chen Jingwen	4 × 400 metres relay			3:32.39 SB	17			Did not advance	
Liu Hong	20 kilometres walk							1:30:00	2nd place, silver medalist(s)
Qieyang Shenjie	20 kilometres walk							1:31:14	5
Gao Ni	20 kilometres walk							1:32:49	14
Xie Limei	Triple jump	13.75	25					Did not advance	
Li Yanmei	Triple jump	13.52	29					Did not advance	
Zheng Xingjuan	High jump	1.95 PB	9 Q					1.93	6
Li Ling	Pole vault	4.25	29					Did not advance	
Wu Sha	Pole vault	DNS						Did not advance	
Gong Lijiao	Shot put	19.21	2 Q					19.97	4
Li Ling	Shot put	18.67	13 Q					19.71	6
Liu Xiangrong	Shot put	18.22	17					Did not advance	
Li Yanfeng	Discus throw	64.44	2nd Q					66.52	1st place, gold medalist(s)
Tan Jian	Discus throw	62.26	5th Q					62.96	6th
Ma Xuejun	Discus throw	59.71	14th					Did not advance	
Zhang Wenxiu	Hammer throw	74.17	1 Q					75.03	3rd place, bronze medalist(s)
Liu Tingting	Hammer throw	63.12	29					Did not advance	
Liu Chunhua	Javelin throw	57.52	20					Did not advance	
