= China at the 2007 World Championships in Athletics =

- WA code: CHN
- National federation: Chinese Athletics Association
- Website: [ www.athletics.org.cn/%20www.athletics.org.cn]]

in Osaka
- Competitors: ? (? men, ? women)
- Medals: Gold 1 Silver 1 Bronze 1 Total 3

World Championships in Athletics appearances (overview)
- 1983; 1987; 1991; 1993; 1995; 1997; 1999; 2001; 2003; 2005; 2007; 2009; 2011; 2013; 2015; 2017; 2019; 2022; 2023; 2025

China competed at the 2007 World Championships in Athletics.

== Medal winners ==
Liu Xiang won the gold medal in the Men's 110 metres hurdles.

Zhou Chunxiu won the silver medal in the Women's Marathon.

Zhang Wenxiu won the bronze medal in the Women's hammer throw.
