= China at the 2023 World Athletics Championships =

- WA code: CHN

in Budapest, Hungary 19 August 2023 – 27 August 2023
- Competitors: 41 (20 men and 21 women) in 17 events
- Medals Ranked 37th: Gold 0 Silver 0 Bronze 2 Total 2

World Athletics Championships appearances (overview)
- 1983; 1987; 1991; 1993; 1995; 1997; 1999; 2001; 2003; 2005; 2007; 2009; 2011; 2013; 2015; 2017; 2019; 2022; 2023

China competed at the 2023 World Athletics Championships in Budapest, Hungary, from 19 to 27 August 2023.

== Medalists ==
Medal	Athlete	Event	Date
Bronze	Feng Bin	Women's discus throw	22 August
Bronze	Gong Lijiao	Women's shot put	26 August

== Results ==
Key

- Q = Qualified for the next round
- q = Qualified for the next round as a fastest loser or, in field events, by position without achieving the qualifying target
- NR = National record
- PB = Personal best
- SB = Season best
- NM = No mark
- N/A = Round not applicable for the event

=== Men ===
==== Track and road events ====
Athlete	Event	Heat		Semifinal		Final	
Athlete	Event	Result	Rank	Result	Rank	Result	Rank
Zhu Shenglong	110 metres hurdles	13.69	7	Did not advance			
Xie Zhiyu	400 metres hurdles	49.25	4 Q	49.57	7	Did not advance	
Feng Peiyou	Marathon	—				2:22:00	49
He Jie	Marathon	—				2:19:48	45
Yang Shaohui	Marathon	—				2:17:12	38
Niu Wenchao	20 kilometres walk	—				1:27:26	44
Wang Zhaozhao	20 kilometres walk	—				1:24:23	37
Zhang Jun	20 kilometres walk	—				1:23:13	29
He Xianghong	35 kilometres walk	—				2:37:31	23
Wang Qin	35 kilometres walk	—				2:39:19	28
Zhaxi Yangben	35 kilometres walk	—				DQ	

==== Field events ====
Athlete	Event	Qualification		Final	
Athlete	Event	Distance	Position	Distance	Position
Wang Jianan	Long jump	8.34 SB	2 Q	8.05	5
Zhang Jingqiang	Long jump	7.64	25	Did not advance	
Zhang Mingkun	Long jump	7.97	15	Did not advance	
Fang Yaoqing	Triple jump	16.83	8 q	17.01	6
Su Wen	Triple jump	16.59	17	Did not advance	
Zhu Yaming	Triple jump	17.14	2 q	17.15	4
Huang Bokai	Pole vault	5.75 =PB	13 q	5.75 =PB	6
Yao Jie	Pole vault	5.75	5 q	5.75	9
Zhong Tao	Pole vault	5.70	18	Did not advance	

=== Women ===
==== Track and road events ====
Athlete	Event	Heat		Final	
Athlete	Event	Result	Rank	Result	Rank
He Wuga	5000 metres	15:54.30	17	Did not advance	
Li Zhixuan	Marathon	—		2:35:48	32
Zhang Deshun	Marathon	—		2:40:17	48
Liu Hong	20 kilometres walk	—		1:30:43	17
Ma Zhenxia	20 kilometres walk	—		1:28:30	7
Yang Jiayu	20 kilometres walk	—		1:29:40	12
Bai Xueying	35 kilometres walk	—		2:49:34	11
Li Maocuo	35 kilometres walk	—		DNF	
Qieyang Shijie	35 kilometres walk	—		DNF	

==== Field events ====
Athlete	Event	Qualification		Final	
Athlete	Event	Distance	Position	Distance	Position
Li Ling	Pole vault	4.60	13	Did not advance	
Niu Chunge	Pole vault	4.50	16	Did not advance	
Xu Huiqin	Pole vault	NM		Did not advance	
Gong Lijiao	Shot put	19.16	8 Q	19.69	3rd place, bronze medalist(s)
Song Jiayuan	Shot put	18.64	11 q	18.90	11
Zhang Linru	Shot put	18.08	17	Did not advance	
Feng Bin	Discus throw	65.68	2 Q	68.20 SB	3rd place, bronze medalist(s)
Wang Fang	Discus throw	58.78	19	Did not advance	
Ji Li	Hammer throw	70.59	16	Did not advance	
Wang Zheng	Hammer throw	71.93	10 q	72.14	8
Zhao Jie	Hammer throw	73.23 PB	7 Q	70.29	10
Liu Shiying	Javelin throw	60.72	9 q	61.66 SB	6
