= China at the 2022 World Athletics Championships =

- WA code: CHN

in Eugene, United States 15 July 2022 – 24 July 2022
- Competitors: 46 (19 men and 27 women) in 23 events
- Medals Ranked 6th: Gold 2 Silver 1 Bronze 3 Total 6

World Athletics Championships appearances (overview)
- 1983; 1987; 1991; 1993; 1995; 1997; 1999; 2001; 2003; 2005; 2007; 2009; 2011; 2013; 2015; 2017; 2019; 2022; 2023; 2025

China competed at the 2022 World Athletics Championships in Eugene, United States, from 15 to 24 July 2022.

== Medallists ==
Medal	Name	Event	Date
Gold	Wang Jianan	Men's long jump	16 July
Gold	Feng Bin	Women's discus throw	20 July
Silver	Gong Lijiao	Women's shot put	16 July
Bronze	Qieyang Shijie	Women's 20 km walk	15 July
Bronze	Qieyang Shijie	Women's 35 km walk	22 July
Bronze	Zhu Yaming	Men's triple jump	23 July

== Results ==
China entered 46 athletes.

Key

- Q = Qualified for the next round
- q = Qualified for the next round as a fastest loser or, in field events, by position without achieving the qualifying target
- NR = National record
- PB = Personal best
- SB = Season best
- N/A = Round not applicable for the event

=== Men ===
Track and road events

Athlete	Event	Heat		Semi-final		Final	
Athlete	Event	Result	Rank	Result	Rank	Result	Rank
Su Bingtian	100 m	10.15 =SB	21 q	10.30	23	Did not advance	
Xie Zhenye	200 m	20.30	14 Q	20.41	15	Did not advance	
Dong Guojian	Marathon	—N/a				2:11:14 SB	23
Yang Shaohui	Marathon	—N/a				2:11:56	31
Peng Jianhua	Marathon	—N/a				2:16:12 SB	45
Xie Wenjun	110 m hurdles	13.58	25	Did not advance			
Tang Xingqiang; Xie Zhenye; Su Bingtian; Chen Guanfeng	4 × 100 metres relay	38.83 SB	12	—N/a		Did not advance	
Wang Kaihua	20 km walk	—N/a				1:21:41 SB	13
Cui Lihong	20 km walk	—N/a				1:22:17	14
Peng Jianhua	20 km walk	—N/a				1:24:35	24
He Xianghong	35 km walk	—N/a				2:24:45 NR	5
Zhaxi Yangben	35 km walk	—N/a				2:28:56 PB	15
Xu Hao	35 km walk	—N/a				2:29:55 PB	17

Field events

Athlete	Event	Qualification		Final	
Athlete	Event	Distance	Position	Distance	Position
Huang Bokai	Pole vault	5.50	24	Did not advance	
Wang Jianan	Long jump	7.98	10 q	8.36 SB	1st place, gold medalist(s)
Huang Changzhou	Long jump	7.75	22	Did not advance	
Zhu Yaming	Triple jump	17.08	4 Q	17.31 SB	3rd place, bronze medalist(s)
Fang Yaoqing	Triple jump	Did not start		Did not advance	

=== Women ===
Track and road events

Athlete	Event	Heat		Semi-final		Final	
Athlete	Event	Result	Rank	Result	Rank	Result	Rank
Ge Manqi	100 m	11.17 =SB	21 q	11.13	15	Did not advance	
Liang Xiaojing	100 m	11.25	25	Did not advance			
Zhang Deshun	Marathon	—N/a				2:28:11	11
Li Zhixuan	Marathon	—N/a				2:31:20 SB	22
Mo Jiadie	400 m hurdles	57.01	31	Did not advance			
Xu Shuangshuang	3000 m steeplechase	9:39.17 SB	32	—N/a		Did not advance	
Li He; Ge Manqi; Wei Yongli; Liang Xiaojing	4 × 100 metres relay	42.93 SB	9	—N/a		Did not advance	
Qieyang Shijie	20 km walk	—N/a				1:27:56	3rd place, bronze medalist(s)
Liu Hong	20 km walk	—N/a				1:29:00 SB	5
Ma Zhenxia	20 km walk	—N/a				1:30:39	10
Wu Quanming	20 km walk	—N/a				1:31:44	13
Qieyang Shijie	35 km walk	—N/a				2:40:37 AR	3rd place, bronze medalist(s)
Li Maocuo	35 km walk	—N/a				2:44:28 PB	7
Yin Lamei	35 km walk	—N/a				2:46:02 PB	10

Field events

Athlete	Event	Qualification		Final	
Athlete	Event	Distance	Position	Distance	Position
Lu Jiawen	High jump	1.75	28	Did not advance	
Xu Huiqin	Pole vault	4.50	1 q	4.30	13
Li Ling	Pole vault	4.35 SB	12 q	4.60 SB	6
Niu Chunge	Pole vault	4.20	26	Did not advance	
Gong Lijiao	Shot put	19.51 SB	1 Q	20.39 SB	2nd place, silver medalist(s)
Song Jiayuan	Shot put	19.08	6 Q	19.57	6
Zhang Linru	Shot put	17.54	19	Did not advance	
Feng Bin	Discus throw	64.01	8 Q	69.12 PB	1st place, gold medalist(s)
Luo Na	Hammer throw	71.36	10 q	70.42	8
Li Jiangyan	Hammer throw	70.50	14	Did not advance	
Zhao Jie	Hammer throw	68.18	21	Did not advance	
Liu Shiying	Javelin throw	63.86 SB	2 Q	63.25	4
Lü Huihui	Javelin throw	57.59 SB	16	Did not advance	
