= China at the 2013 World Championships in Athletics =

- WA code: CHN

in Moscow
- Competitors: 55
- Medals: Gold 0 Silver 1 Bronze 3 Total 4

World Championships in Athletics appearances (overview)
- 1983; 1987; 1991; 1993; 1995; 1997; 1999; 2001; 2003; 2005; 2007; 2009; 2011; 2013; 2015; 2017; 2019; 2022; 2023; 2025

China competed at the 2013 World Championships in Athletics in Moscow, Russia, from 10–18 August 2013. A team of 55 athlete was announced to represent the country in the event.

== Results ==
(q – qualified, NM – no mark, SB – season best)

=== Men ===
==== Track events ====
Athlete	Event	Preliminaries		Heats		Semifinals		Final	
Athlete	Event	Time	Rank	Time	Rank	Time	Rank	Time	Rank
Su Bingtian	100 metres	—N/a							
Zhang Peimeng	100 metres	—N/a							
Xie Zhenye	200 metres	—N/a							
Yin Shujin	Marathon	—N/a							
Jiang Fan	110 metres hurdles	—N/a							
Xie Wenjun	110 metres hurdles	—N/a							
Guo Fan; Liang Jiahong; Su Bingtian; Xie Zhenye; Zhang Peimeng	4 x 100 metres relay			—N/a					

==== Walking events ====
Athlete	Event	Final	
Athlete	Event	Time	Rank
Cai Zelin	20 kilometres walk	1:25:21	26
Chen Ding	20 kilometres walk	1:21:09	2nd place, silver medalist(s)
Wang Zhen	20 kilometres walk	DSQ	–
Li Jianbo	50 kilometres walk		
Si Tianfeng	50 kilometres walk		
Wu Qianlong	50 kilometres walk		
Xu Faguang	50 kilometres walk		

==== Field events ====
Athlete	Event	Preliminaries		Final	
Athlete	Event	Mark	Rank	Mark	Rank
Li Jinzhe	Long jump				
Wang Jianan	Long jump				
Cao Shuo	Triple jump				
Dong Bin	Triple jump				
Bi Xiaoliang	High jump				
Wang Yu	High jump				
Zhang Guowei	High jump				
