= China at the 2019 World Athletics Championships =

- WA code: CHN

in Doha
- Competitors: 58 (27 men and 31 women) in 25 events
- Medals Ranked 4th: Gold 3 Silver 3 Bronze 3 Total 9

World Athletics Championships appearances (overview)
- 1983; 1987; 1991; 1993; 1995; 1997; 1999; 2001; 2003; 2005; 2007; 2009; 2011; 2013; 2015; 2017; 2019; 2022; 2023; 2025

China competed at the 2019 World Championships in Athletics in Doha, Qatar, from 27 September to 6 October 2019. A total of 69 athletes from China participated.

== Medallists ==
The following competitors from China won medals at the Championships.

Medal	Athlete	Event	Date
Gold	Liang Rui	Women's 50 kilometres walk	September 28
Gold	Liu Hong	Women's 20 kilometres walk	September 29
Gold	Gong Lijiao	Women's shot put	October 3
Silver	Li Maocuo	Women's 50 kilometres walk	September 28
Silver	Qieyang Shenjie	Women's 20 kilometres walk	September 29
Silver	Liu Shiying	Women's javelin throw	October 1
Bronze	Wang Zheng	Women's hammer throw	September 28
Bronze	Yang Liujing	Women's 20 kilometres walk	September 29
Bronze	Lü Huihui	Women's javelin throw	October 1

== Results ==
Key

- Note–Ranks given for track events are within the athlete's heat only
- Q = Qualified for the next round
- q = Qualified for the next round as a fastest loser or, in field events, by position without achieving the qualifying target
- NR = National record
- PB = Personal best
- N/A = Round not applicable for the event
- Bye = Athlete not required to compete in round

=== Men ===
Track and road events

Athlete	Event	Preliminary		Heat		Semifinal		Final	
Athlete	Event	Result	Rank	Result	Rank	Result	Rank	Result	Rank
Xu Zhouzheng	100 m	10.35	3 Q	10.37	36	did not advance			
Su Bingtian	100 m	—N/a		10.21	22 q	10.23	21	did not advance	
Xie Zhenye	100 m	—N/a		10.19	16 Q	10.14	13	did not advance	
Xie Zhenye	200 m	—N/a		20.20	6 Q	20.03	3 q	20.14	7
Yang Shaohui	Marathon	—N/a						2:15:17	20
Duo Bujie	Marathon	—N/a						did not finish	
Xie Wenjun	110 m hurdles	—N/a		13.38	7 Q	13.22	6 q	13.29	5
Zeng Jianhang	110 m hurdles	—N/a		13.68	26	did not advance			
Su Bingtian; Xu Zhouzheng; Wu Zhiqiang; Bie Ge; Xie Zhenye*	4 × 100 m relay	—N/a		37.79 NR	4 Q	—N/a		38.07	6
Wang Kaihua	20 km walk	—N/a						1:29:52	8
Yin Jiaxing	20 km walk	—N/a						1:29:53	9
Cai Zelin	20 km walk	—N/a						did not finish	
Niu Wenbin	50 km walk	—N/a						4:05:36	4
Luo Yadong	50 km walk	—N/a						4:06:49	5
Wang Qin	50 km walk	—N/a						did not finish	

Field events

Athlete	Event	Qualification		Final	
Athlete	Event	Result	Rank	Result	Rank
Wang Yu	High jump	2.29	7 q	2.24	19
Huang Bokai	Pole vault	5.75 PB	6 Q	5.55	9
Ding Bangchao	Pole vault	5.60	21	did not advance	
Yao Jie	Pole vault	NM		did not advance	
Wang Jianan	Long jump	7.89	11 q	8.20 SB	6
Zhang Yaoguang	Long jump	7.82	14	did not advance	
Huang Changzhou	Long jump	7.81	16	did not advance	
Fang Yaoqing	Triple jump	16.92	9 q	16.65	10
Wu Ruiting	Triple jump	16.90	10 q	16.97	9
Zhu Yaming	Triple jump	16.79	16	did not advance	
Liu Qizhen	Javelin throw	75.81	25	did not advance	
Zhao Qinggang	Javelin throw	NM		did not advance	

=== Women ===
Track and road events

Athlete	Event	Heat		Semifinal		Final	
Athlete	Event	Result	Rank	Result	Rank	Result	Rank
Wei Yongli	100 m	11.28	18 q	11.28	17	did not advance	
Ge Manqi	100 m	11.28	19 q	11.31	21	did not advance	
Liang Xiaojing	100 m	11.18	9 Q	11.20	13	did not advance	
Liang Xiaojing	200 m	23.27	28	did not advance			
Zhang Man	200 m	23.60	39	did not advance			
Wang Chunyu	800 m	2:03.25	22 Q	2:02.84	19	did not advance	
Ma Yugui	Marathon	—N/a				2:55:24	24
Ciren Cuomu	Marathon	—N/a				3:01:56	33
Li Dan	Marathon	—N/a				did not finish	
Xu Shuangshuang	3000 m steeplechase	9:42.23	23	—N/a		did not advance	
Zhang Xinyan	3000 m steeplechase	9:43.75	25	—N/a		did not advance	
Liang Xiaojing; Wei Yongli; Kong Lingwei; Ge Manqi	4 × 100 m relay	42.36	3 Q	—N/a		DQ	
Liu Hong	20 km walk	—N/a				1:32:53	1st place, gold medalist(s)
Qieyang Shijie	20 km walk	—N/a				1:33:10	2nd place, silver medalist(s)
Yang Liujing	20 km walk	—N/a				1:33:17	3rd place, bronze medalist(s)
Liang Rui	50 km walk	—N/a				4:23:26	1st place, gold medalist(s)
Li Maocuo	50 km walk	—N/a				4:26:40	2nd place, silver medalist(s)
Ma Faying	50 km walk	—N/a				4:34:56	5

Field events

Athlete	Event	Qualification		Final	
Athlete	Event	Result	Rank	Result	Rank
Li Ling	Pole vault	4.60	10 Q	4.50	13
Xu Huiqin	Pole vault	4.50	19	did not advance	
Gong Lijiao	Shot put	18.96	3 Q	19.55	1st place, gold medalist(s)
Zhang Linru	Shot put	17.65	17	did not advance	
Song Jiayuan	Shot put	17.24	23	did not advance	
Chen Yang	Discus throw	63.10	7 Q	63.38	4
Feng Bin	Discus throw	62.51	9 q	62.48	5
Wang Zheng	Hammer throw	72.65	7 Q	74.76	3rd place, bronze medalist(s)
Luo Na	Hammer throw	71.35	12 q	72.04	8
Liu Tingting	Hammer throw	67.11	25	did not advance	
Lü Huihui	Javelin throw	67.27	1 Q	65.49	3rd place, bronze medalist(s)
Liu Shiying	Javelin throw	63.48	3 q	65.88 SB	2nd place, silver medalist(s)
Su Lingdan	Javelin throw	58.56	19	did not advance	
Yu Yuzhen	Javelin throw	53.38	30	did not advance	
