= 2018 USA Outdoor Track and Field Championships =

2018 USA Track & Field Outdoor Championships
- Dates: June 21–24
- Host city: Des Moines, Iowa, United States
- Venue: Drake Stadium, Drake University
- Level: Senior
- Type: Outdoor
- Events: 40 (men: 20; women: 20)

The 2018 USA Outdoor Track and Field Championships were held at Drake Stadium on the campus of Drake University in Des Moines, Iowa. Organized by USA Track & Field, the four-day competition took place June 21–24 and serves as the national championships in track and field for the United States.

The 50 kilometers race walk was held January 20 at Santee, California.

== Schedule ==
Event schedule
| Day | Events |
|---|---|
| June 21 | Decathlon (day 1), 800 m heats (men and women), triple jump final (women), 400 m heats (men and women), 1500 m heats (men), javelin final (men), hammer throw (men), discus throw final (men), shot put (women), 400 m hurdles heats (men), 100 m heats (men and women), steeplechase heats (women), 10,000 meters final (men and women) |
| June 22 | Decathlon (day 2), 100 m hurdles heats (women), 100 m semi-finals and finals (men and women), triple jump final (women), javelin final (women), high jump final (men), steeplechase heats (men), 1500 m heats (women), 400 m semi-finals (men and women), 800 m semi-finals (men and women) |
| June 23 | Heptathlon (day 1), hammer throw final (women), pole vault final (men), long jump final (women), discus throw final (women), 100 m hurdles semi-finals and finals (women), 200 m heats (men and women), 110 m hurdles heats (men), 400 m hurdles semi-finals (women), 400 m hurdles final (men), steeplechase final (women), 1500 m final (men), 400 m final (men and women) |
| June 24 | 20 km walk final (men and women), 5000 m final (men and women), heptathlon (day 2), 200 m semi-finals and finals (men and women), pole vault final (women), high jump final (women), triple jump final (men), shot put (men), 110 m hurdles semi-finals and final (men), 400 m hurdles final (women), 800 m final (men and women), steeplechase final (men), 1500 m final (women) |

== Men's results ==
Key: ≠ Not yet selected in respective event because the athlete has not achieved the required qualifying standard. However, athletes can still pursue standards following this meet and still make the team provided they attain it before the July 23 cutoff date..

=== Men track events ===
| Event | Gold | | Silver | | Bronze | |
|---|---|---|---|---|---|---|
| 100 meters +1.1 | Noah Lyles | 9.88 | Ronnie Baker | 9.90 | Kendal Williams | 10.00 |
| 200 meters -1.9 | Ameer Webb | 20.47 | Terrell Smith | 20.74 | Andrew Hudson | 20.80 |
| 400 meters | Kahmari Montgomery | 44.58 | Paul Dedewo | 44.64 | Michael Cherry | 44.85 |
| 800 meters | Clayton Murphy | 1:46.50 | Isaiah Harris | 1:47.11 | Erik Sowinski | 1:47.76 |
| 1500 meters | Matthew Centrowitz | 3:43.37 | Izaic Yorks | 3:43.63 | Eric Jenkins | 3:43.74 |
| 5000 meters | Paul Chelimo | 13:29.47 | Ryan Hill | 13:29.67 | Hassan Mead | 13:30.12 |
| 10,000 meters | Lopez Lomong | 28:58.38 | Shadrack Kipchirchir | 28:59.67 | Elkanah Kibet | 29:00.00 |
| 110 m hurdles^{[d]} -1.8 | Devon Allen | 13.46 (13.452) | Grant Holloway | 13.46 (13.454) | Jarret Eaton | 13.51 |
| 400 m hurdles^{[e]} | Kenny Selmon | 48.21 | TJ Holmes | 48.51 | Khallifah Rosser | 48.65 |
| 3000 m steeplechase | Evan Jager | 8:20.10 | Hillary Bor | 8:22.58 | Andy Bayer | 8:24.66 |
| 20 kilometers walk^{[m]} | Nick Christie | 1:24:53.37 | Emmanuel Corvera | 1:27:47.13 | John Cody Rich | 1:28:29.47 |
| 50 kilometers walk | Nick Christie | 4:09:32 | Matthew Forgues | 4:23:28 | Anthony Joseph Grut | 4:45:16 |

=== Men field events ===
| Event | Gold | | Silver | | Bronze | |
|---|---|---|---|---|---|---|
| High jump^{[c]} | Jeron Robinson | 2.31 m (7 ft 6 3/4 in) | Erik Kynard | 2.28 m (7 ft 5 3/4 in) | Trey Culver | 2.28 m (7 ft 5 3/4 in) |
| Pole vault | Sam Kendricks | 5.85 m (19 ft 2 1/4 in) | Chris Nilsen | 5.80 m (19 ft 1/4 in) | Cole Walsh | 5.75 m (18 ft 10 1/4 in) |
| Long jump^{[f]} | Jeff Henderson | 8.10 m (26 ft 6 3/4 in) +0.3 | Zack Bazile | 8.08 m (26 ft 6 in) +1.0 | Marquis Dendy | 8.04 m (26 ft 4 1/2 in)w +2.4 (7.97) -0.8 |
| Triple jump | Donald Scott | 17.37 m (56 ft 11 3/4 in) +0.9 | Chris Benard | 17.32 m (56 ft 9 3/4 in) +0.9 | KeAndre Bates | 17.16 m (56 ft 3 1/2 in) +1.0 |
| Shot put^{[a]} | Darrell Hill | 21.57 m (70 ft 9 in) | Ryan Crouser | 20.99 m (68 ft 10 1/4 in) | Curtis Jensen | 20.87 m (68 ft 5 1/2 in) |
| Discus throw | Reggie Jagers | 68.61 m (225 ft 1 in) | Mason Finley | 67.06 m (220 ft 0 in) | Sam Mattis | 66.32 m (217 ft 7 in) |
| Hammer throw^{[g]} | Rudy Winkler | 73.76 m (241 ft 11 in) | Alex Young | 73.22 m (240 ft 2 in) | Sean Donnelly | 73.09 m (239 ft 9 in) |
| Javelin throw | Curtis Thompson | 75.99 m (249 ft 3 in) | Capers Williamson | 75.71 m (248 ft 4 in) | Riley Dolezal | 75.10 m (246 ft 4 in) |
| Decathlon | Zach Ziemek | 8294 points | Solomon Simmons | 8019 points | Harrison Williams | 7878 points |

==== Men's Notes ====
^{a}

== Women's results ==
Key:

=== Women track events ===
| Event | Gold | | Silver | | Bronze | |
|---|---|---|---|---|---|---|
| 100 meters +0.6 | Aleia Hobbs | 10.91 | Ashley Henderson | 10.96 | Jenna Prandini | 10.98 |
| 200 meters -1.0 | Jenna Prandini | 22.62 | Phyllis Francis | 22.83 | Kyra Jefferson | 22.89 |
| 400 meters | Shakima Wimbley | 49.52 | Jessica Beard | 50.08 | Kendall Ellis | 50.37 |
| 800 meters | Ajeé Wilson | 1:58.18 | Raevyn Rogers | 1:58.57 | Ce'Aira Brown | 1:58.65 |
| 1500 meters | Shelby Houlihan | 4:05.48 | Jenny Simpson | 4:06.21 | Kate Grace | 4:07.04 |
| 5000 meters | Shelby Houlihan | 15:31.03 | Rachel Schneider | 15:32.71 | Karissa Schweizer | 15:34.31 |
| 10,000 meters | Molly Huddle | 31:52.32 | Marielle Hall | 31:56.68 | Stephanie Bruce | 32:05.05 |
| 100 m hurdles^{[d]} -1.4 | Keni Harrison | 12.46 | Christina Manning | 12.65 | Sharika Nelvis | 12.68 |
| 400 m hurdles^{[e]} | Shamier Little | 53.61 | Georganne Moline | 54.12 | Cassandra Tate | 55.00 |
| 3000 m steeplechase | Emma Coburn | 9:17.70 | Courtney Frerichs | 9:18.69 | Mel Lawrence | 9:33.30 |
| 20 kilometers walk^{[m]} | Maria Michta-Coffey | 1:35:21.59 | Katie Burnett | 1:37:55.97 | Robyn Stevens | 1:40:28.96 |
| 50 kilometers walk | Mariela Sanchez Mexico; Katie Burnett | 4:46:12; 4:47:50 | Erin Taylor-Talcott | 4:59:16 | Anett Torma Hungary; Teresa Vaill (W55) | 4:59:55; 5:29:29 |

=== Women field events ===
| Event | Gold | | Silver | | Bronze | |
|---|---|---|---|---|---|---|
| High jump | Vashti Cunningham | 1.95 m (6 ft 4 3/4 in) | Inika McPherson | 1.92 m (6 ft 3 1/2 in) | Liz Patterson | 1.89 m (6 ft 2 1/4 in) |
| Pole vault | Sandi Morris | 4.80 m (15 ft 8 3/4 in) | Katie Nageotte | 4.70 m (15 ft 5 in) | Jenn Suhr | 4.60 m (15 ft 1 in) |
| Long jump^{[b]} | Sha'Keela Saunders | 6.54 m (21 ft 5 1/4 in) -2.2 | Quanesha Burks | 6.52 m (21 ft 4 1/2 in) -2.5 | Kendell Williams | 6.48 m (21 ft 3 in) -0.7 |
| Triple jump | Keturah Orji | 14.59 m (47 ft 10 1/4 in) +1.9 | Tori Franklin | 14.52 m (47 ft 7 1/2 in)w +3.8 (14.48) +0.4 | Imani Oliver | 14.22 m (46 ft 7 3/4 in)w +2.8 (13.80) +1.9 |
| Shot put | Maggie Ewen | 19.29 m (63 ft 3 1/4 in) | Jessica Ramsey | 19.23 m (63 ft 1 in) | Raven Saunders | 18.74 m (61 ft 5 3/4 in) |
| Discus throw | Valarie Allman | 63.55 m (208 ft 5 in) | Maggie Ewen | 61.13 m (200 ft 6 in) | Laulauga Tausaga-Collins | 60.65 m (198 ft 11 in) |
| Hammer throw | DeAnna Price | 78.12 m (256 ft 3 in) NR, CR | Gwendolyn Berry | 72.99 m (239 ft 5 in) | Brooke Andersen | 72.17 m (236 ft 9 in) |
| Javelin throw^{[h]} | Kara Winger | 62.88 m (206 ft 3 in) | Avione Allgood | 56.54 m (185 ft 5 in) | Ariana Ince | 55.97 m (183 ft 7 in) |
| Heptathlon (Note: Alex Gochenour was originally 2nd with 6003 points, but she was later disqualified due to testing positive for ostarine at the competition. She stated she did not know where the substance came from.) | Erica Bougard | 6347 points | Lindsay Schwartz | 5933 points | Allison Reaser | 5901 points |

== Masters exhibition events ==
| Event | Gold | | Silver | | Bronze | |
|---|---|---|---|---|---|---|
| Mixed gender 200 meters +1.7 | Charles Allie (M70) | 25.75 | Ty Brown (M73) | 27.66 | Roger Pierce (M73) | 28.72 |

== Qualification ==
The 2018 USA Outdoor Track and Field Championships serve as the qualification meet for United States representatives in international competitions, including the 2018 NACAC Championships. In order to be entered, athletes need to achieve a qualifying standard mark and place in the top 3 in their event. The United States team, as managed by USATF, can also bring a qualified back up athlete in case one of the team members is unable to perform.

Additionally, defending World Champions and 2017 Diamond League Champions received byes into the World Championships. The athletes eligible for a bye are:

=== Defending World Champions ===
- Christian Taylor - Triple jump
- Justin Gatlin - 100 m
- Sam Kendricks - Pole Vault
- Phyllis Francis - 400 meters
- Tori Bowie - 100 meters
- Kori Carter - 400 meters hurdles
- Emma Coburn - 3000 m steeplechase
- Brittney Reese - long jump

=== Diamond League Champions ===
- Sam Kendricks - Pole Vault
- Christian Taylor - Triple jump (Does not displace; already World Champion)
- Darrell Hill - Shot Put
- Dalilah Muhammad - 400 meters hurdles
- Noah Lyles - 200 meters

Both qualified by winning their respective events in the championships.
