= Curtis Jensen =

American shot putter (born 1990)

Personal information
- Nickname: Curt Jensen
- Nationality: USA
- Born: 1 November 1990 (age 36)
- Home town: Geneseo, Illinois
- Height: 193 cm (6 ft 4 in)
- Weight: 130 kg (290 lb)

Sport
- Sport: Athletics
- Event: Shot put
- College team: Illinois State Redbirds
- Club: Velaasa Track Club
- Now coaching: Wisconsin-Eau Claire Blugolds

Achievements and titles
- National finals: 2013 USA Indoors; • Shot put, 7th; 2013 USAs; • Shot put, 12th; 2014 USAs; • Shot put, 10th; 2016 USA Indoors; • Shot put, 8th; 2017 USA Indoors; • Shot put, 6th; 2017 USAs; • Shot put, 13th; 2018 USA Indoors; • Shot put, 4th; 2018 USAs; • Shot put, 3rd (bronze); 2019 USA Indoors; • Shot put, 4th; 2019 USAs; • Shot put, 7th; 2021 USA OTs; • Shot put, 8th
- Personal bests: SP: 21.63m (2018); SP (indoors): 20.29m (2013)

Curtis Jensen (born 1 November 1990), also known as Curt Jensen, is an American shot put thrower. He has made 11 national finals, with his best finish being third at the 2018 USA Outdoor Track and Field Championships.

== Biography ==
Jensen was raised in Geneseo, Illinois where he attended Geneseo High School, where he competed in football, wrestling, and track, with a best finish of 2nd at the state meet in discus throw.

In 2009, Jensen joined the Illinois State Redbirds track and field team. His two NCAA Division I championship finals appearances came during his final year in 2014, where he placed 8th both indoors and outdoors in the shot put.

From 2013 to 2021, Jensen made 11 appearances at USATF indoor and outdoor championships, with a best finish of 3rd at the 2018 outdoor edition in a non-global-championship year. Jensen also set his personal best in 2018 to win the Grande Premio Brasil de Atletismo meeting in Brazil. At the end of that year, Jensen was ranked 8th globally in the shot put.

In August 2023, Jensen became the 5th person on record to jerk lift 500 pounds, according to USA Weightlifting media partner BarBend.

As of 2023, Jensen coaches the Wisconsin–Eau Claire Blugolds track and field team residing in Bloomer, Wisconsin.

== Statistics ==
=== Personal bests ===
Event	Mark	Competition	Venue	Date
Shot put	21.63 m	Grande Premio Brasil de Atletismo	Bragança Paulista, Brazil	8 July 2018
Shot put (indoors)	20.29 m	Eastern Illinois University Early Bird Invite	Charleston, Illinois	6 December 2013
