= 2025 Asian Athletics Championships – Women's 20 kilometres walk =

Women's 20 kilometres walk at the 2025 Asian Athletics Championships
- Location: Gumi, South Korea
- Dates: 27 May
- Competitors: 11 from 6 nations
- Winning time: 1:30:44

Medalists
gold medal	Yin Hang	China
silver medal	Ma Li	China
bronze medal	Yasmina Toxanbayeva	Kazakhstan

The women's 20 kilometres walk event at the 2025 Asian Athletics Championships was held on 27 May.

== Records ==
Records before the 2025 Asian Athletics Championships
Record	Athlete (nation)	Time (s)	Location	Date
World record	Yelena Lashmanova (RUS)	1:23:39	Cheboksary, Russia	9 June 2018
Asian record	Yang Jiayu (CHN)	1:23:49	Huangshan, China	20 March 2021
Championship record	Mayumi Kawasaki (JPN)	1:30:12	Guangzhou, China	13 November 2009
World leading	Elvira Chepareva (RUS)	1:24:20	Sochi, Russia	24 February 2025
Asian leading	Nanako Fujii (JPN)	1:26:33	Kobe, Japan	16 February 2025

== Schedule ==
The event schedule, in local time (UTC+9), was as follows:

Date	Time	Round
27 May	10:00	Final

== Results ==
Place	Athlete	Nation	Time	Notes
1st place, gold medalist(s)	Yin Hang	China	1:30:44	
2nd place, silver medalist(s)	Ma Li	China	1:32:08	
3rd place, bronze medalist(s)	Yasmina Toxanbayeva	Kazakhstan	1:32:22	
4	Ayane Yanai	Japan	1:33:15	
5	Yukiko Umeno	Japan	1:36:31	
6	Lee Se-ha	South Korea	1:37:03	SB
7	Lee Jeong-eun	South Korea	1:40:09	
8	Violine Intan Puspita	Indonesia	1:47:24	PB
9	Zin May Htet	Myanmar	1:53:35	
10	Halida Ulfah	Indonesia	1:55:52	
—	Kim Min-ji	South Korea	DQ	
