= China at the 2009 World Championships in Athletics =

- WA code: CHN
- National federation: Chinese Athletics Association
- Website: [ www.athletics.org.cn/%20www.athletics.org.cn]]

in Berlin
- Competitors: 32 (12 men, 20 women)
- Medals: Gold 1 Silver 1 Bronze 2 Total 4

World Championships in Athletics appearances (overview)
- 1983; 1987; 1991; 1993; 1995; 1997; 1999; 2001; 2003; 2005; 2007; 2009; 2011; 2013; 2015; 2017; 2019; 2022; 2023; 2025

China competes at the 2009 World Championships in Athletics from 15–23 August in Berlin.

Half of China's 32-strong team will be making their debuts. Liu Xiang is out with injury.

== Medal winners ==
Wang Hao won the silver medal in the Men's 20 km race walk competition.

Liu Hong won the bronze medal in the Women's 20 km race walk competition.

Gong Lijiao won the bronze medal in the Women's shot put.

Bai Xue won the gold medal in the Women's Marathon.

== Team selection ==
Track and road events

Event	Athletes	
Event	Men	Women
10,000 metres		Zhang Yingying
110 metre hurdles	Ji Wei; Shi Dongpeng; Jing Yin	
400 metre hurdles		Huang Xiaoxiao
20 km race walk	Chu Yafei; Li Jianbo; Wang Hao	Liu Hong; Yang Mingxia; Yawei Yang
50 km race walk	Li Lei; Faguang Xu; Chenliang Zhao	
Marathon		Bai Xue; Chen Rong; Weiwei Sun; Jiali Wang; Zhou Chunxiu; Zhu Xiaolin

Field and combined events

Event	Athletes	
Event	Men	Women
Long jump	Linzhe Li	
Triple jump	Li Yanxi	Xie Limei
Pole vault		Gao Shuying
Javelin throw	Qin Qiang	
Shot Put		Gong Lijiao; Li Meiju; Xiangrong Liu
Discus throw		Ma Xuejun; Song Aimin; Shaoyang Xu
Hammer throw		Zhang Wenxiu
