= Emily Grove (athlete) =

American pole vaulter

- Emily Grove in the Pole Vault at the Wanda Diamond League’s 2026 Weltklasse Zürich.

Personal information
- Born: May 22, 1993 (age 33) Pontiac, Illinois, U.S.
- Height: 5 ft 5 in (1.66 m)

Sport
- Country: United States
- Sport: Track and field
- Event: Pole vault
- College team: University of South Dakota
- Team: Team ESSX
- Turned pro: 2017

Achievements and titles
- Personal best: 4.75 m (15 ft 7 in)

Emily Grove is a pole vaulter from the Pontiac, Illinois.

== IHSA ==
Grove is a two-time Illinois High School Association state champion in the pole vault representing Pontiac Township High School. Grove set Illinois state record in the pole vault at 4.08 m (13 ft 5 in). Grove also placed seventh in the 4x200-meter relay and 4x400-meter relay. Grove as a sophomore finished fourth in the pole vault at the state meet. Grove also participated in cross country and volleyball.

== NCAA ==
Groves competed for the University of South Dakota, earning All-American honors six times, Academic All-American honors, and graduated in 2017. She was also a four time Summit League champion.

During her senior season, she cleared fifteen feet and at one point led the nation, but finished 15th at the NCAA Championships.

Representing the South Dakota Coyotes
Year	Summit League Indoor	NCAA Indoor	Summit League Outdoor	NCAA Outdoor
2017			Pole Vault; 4.16 m (13 ft 8 in) 1st	Pole Vault; 4.30 m (14 ft 1 in) 15th
2016	Pole Vault; 4.31 m (14 ft 2 in) 1st	Pole Vault; 4.30 m (14 ft 1 in) 7th	Pole Vault; 4.33 m (14 ft 2 in) 1st	Pole Vault; 4.05 m (13 ft 3 in) 15th
2014	Pole Vault; 4.31 m (14 ft 2 in) 1st	Pole Vault; 4.45 m (14 ft 7 in) 2nd		
2013			Pole Vault; 4.10 m (13 ft 5 in) 3rd	Pole Vault; 4.30 m (14 ft 1 in) 7th
2012	Pole Vault; 4.15 m (13 ft 7 in) 2nd		Pole Vault; 4.08 m (13 ft 5 in) 2nd	Pole Vault; 4.25 m (13 ft 11 in) 7th

== International career ==
At the 2017 USA Outdoor Track and Field Championships, Grove finished tied for 3rd, but won in a jump-off in her first attempt. This qualified her for the 2017 World Championships in Athletics in London.

Year	Competition	Venue	Position	Event	Notes
2018	USA Outdoor Track and Field Championships	Des Moines, Iowa	10th	Pole Vault	4.30 m (14 ft 1 in)
2017	USA Outdoor Track and Field Championships	Sacramento, California	3rd	Pole Vault	4.55 m (14 ft 11 in)
2016	USA Olympic Trials	Eugene, Oregon	10th	Pole Vault	4.50 m (14 ft 9 in)
2014	USA Indoor Track and Field Championships	Albuquerque, New Mexico	6th	Pole Vault	4.51 m (14 ft 10 in)

Year	Competition	Venue	Position	Event	Notes
Representing the United States of America
2017	2017 World Championships in Athletics	London Stadium	T-25th	Pole Vault	NH @ 4.20 m (13 ft 9 in)
