= China at the 2017 World Championships in Athletics =

- WA code: CHN

in London
- Competitors: 50 in 18 events
- Medals Ranked 5th: Gold 2 Silver 3 Bronze 2 Total 7

World Championships in Athletics appearances (overview)
- 1983; 1987; 1991; 1993; 1995; 1997; 1999; 2001; 2003; 2005; 2007; 2009; 2011; 2013; 2015; 2017; 2019; 2022; 2023; 2025

China competed at the 2017 World Championships in Athletics in London, United Kingdom, from 4 to 13 August 2017.

== Medalists ==
The following Chinese competitors won medals at the Championships.

Medal	Athlete	Event	Date
Gold	Gong Lijiao	Women's shot put	9 August
Gold	Yang Jiayu	Women's 20 kilometres walk	13 August
Silver	Wang Zheng	Women's hammer throw	7 August
Silver	Li Lingwei	Women's javelin throw	8 August
Silver	Yin Hang	Women's 50 kilometres walk	13 August
Bronze	Lü Huihui	Women's javelin throw	8 August
Bronze	Yang Shuqing	Women's 50 kilometres walk	13 August

== Results ==
(q – qualified, NM – no mark, SB – season best)

=== Men ===
Track and road events

Athlete	Event	Heat		Semifinal		Final	
Athlete	Event	Result	Rank	Result	Rank	Result	Rank
Su Bingtian	100 metres	10.03 SB	4 Q	10.10	8 q	10.27	8
Xie Zhenye	100 metres	10.13	14 Q	10.28	28	Did not advance	
Xie Wenjun	110 metres hurdles	13.34	5 Q	13.36	12	Did not advance	
Wu Zhiqiang; Xie Zhenye; Su Bingtian; Zhang Peimeng	4 × 100 metres relay	38.20	4 Q	—N/a		38.34	4
Jin Xiangqian	20 kilometres walk	—N/a				1:21:24	19
Wang Kaihua	20 kilometres walk	—N/a				1:19:30	7
Wang Rui	20 kilometres walk	—N/a				1:23:09	34
Niu Wenbin	50 kilometres walk	—N/a				4:01:35	30
Wu Qianlong	50 kilometres walk	—N/a				DQ	–
Yu Wei	50 kilometres walk	—N/a				DNF	–

Field events

Athlete	Event	Qualification		Final	
Athlete	Event	Distance	Position	Distance	Position
Wang Yu	High jump	2.29	12 q	DNS	–
Zhang Guowei	High jump	2.22	24	Did not advance	
Xue Changrui	Pole vault	5.60	10 q	5.82 NR	4
Yao Jie	Pole vault	5.60	=11 q	NH	–
Huang Changzhou	Long jump	7.70	24	Did not advance	
Shi Yuhao	Long jump	8.06	7 Q	8.23	6
Wang Jianan	Long jump	7.92	11 q	8.23	7
Fang Yaoqing	Triple jump	16.17	26	Did not advance	
Wu Ruiting	Triple jump	16.66	11 q	16.66	9

=== Women ===
Track and road events

Athlete	Event	Heat		Semifinal		Final	
Athlete	Event	Result	Rank	Result	Rank	Result	Rank
Wei Yongli	100 metres	11.37	26	Did not advance			
Cao Mojie	Marathon	—N/a				DNF	–
Liu Qinghong	Marathon	—N/a				2:52:21 SB	65
Tao Yujia; Wei Yongli; Ge Manqi; Liang Xiaojing	4 × 100 metres relay	DQ	–	—N/a		Did not advance	
Lyu Xiuzhi	20 kilometres walk	—N/a				DQ	–
Wang Na	20 kilometres walk	—N/a				1:29:26	8
Yang Jiayu	20 kilometres walk	—N/a				1:26:18 PB	1st place, gold medalist(s)
Yang Shuqing	50 kilometres walk	—N/a				4:20:49 PB	3rd place, bronze medalist(s)
Yin Hang	50 kilometres walk	—N/a				4:08:58 AR	2nd place, silver medalist(s)

Field events

Athlete	Event	Qualification		Final	
Athlete	Event	Distance	Position	Distance	Position
Bian Ka	Shot put	18.18 SB	6 q	17.60	12
Gao Yang	Shot put	17.87	10 q	18.25	5
Gong Lijiao	Shot put	18.97	1 Q	19.94	1st place, gold medalist(s)
Chen Yang	Discus throw	62.71	9 Q	61.28	10
Feng Bin	Discus throw	62.48	10 q	61.56	8
Su Xinyue	Discus throw	63.00	7 Q	63.37	7
Li Lingwei	Javelin throw	62.29	12 q	66.25 PB	2nd place, silver medalist(s)
Liu Shiying	Javelin throw	64.72	4 Q	62.84	8
Lü Huihui	Javelin throw	67.59 AR	1 Q	65.26	3rd place, bronze medalist(s)
Luo Na	Hammer throw	69.54	13	Did not advance	
Wang Zheng	Hammer throw	71.89	7 Q	75.98	2nd place, silver medalist(s)
Zhang Wenxiu	Hammer throw	71.39	10 q	74.53 SB	4
