= China at the 2015 World Championships in Athletics =

- WA code: CHN

in Beijing
- Competitors: 66
- Medals Ranked 11th: Gold 1 Silver 7 Bronze 1 Total 9

World Championships in Athletics appearances (overview)
- 1983; 1987; 1991; 1993; 1995; 1997; 1999; 2001; 2003; 2005; 2007; 2009; 2011; 2013; 2015; 2017; 2019; 2022; 2023; 2025

China competed at the 2015 World Championships in Athletics in Beijing, China, from 22 to 30 August 2015.

== Medalists ==
The following Chinese competitors won medals at the Championships.

Medal	Athlete	Event	Date
Gold	Liu Hong	Women's 20 km walk	28 August
Silver	Gong Lijiao	Women's shot put	22 August
Silver	Wang Zhen	Men's 20 km walk	23 August
Silver	Zhang Wenxiu	Women's hammer throw	27 August
Silver	Lü Xiuzhi	Women's 20 km walk	28 August
Silver	Mo Youxue; Xie Zhenye; Su Bingtian; Zhang Peimeng	Men's 4 × 100 metres relay	29 August
Silver	Lü Huihui	Women's Javelin throw	30 August
Silver	Zhang Guowei	Men's high jump	30 August
Bronze	Wang Jianan	Men's long jump	25 August

== Results ==
=== Men ===
Track and road events

Athlete	Event	Heat		Semifinal		Final	
Athlete	Event	Result	Rank	Result	Rank	Result	Rank
Su Bingtian	100 metres	10.03	2 Q	9.99 =NR	4 q	10.06	9
Zhang Peimeng	100 metres	10.13 SB	5	Did not advance			
Xie Zhenye	200 metres	DQ		Did not advance			
Guo Zhongze	400 metres	46.42	8	Did not advance			
Duo Bujie	5000 metres	14:07.35	18	—N/a		Did not advance	
Guan Siyang	Marathon	—N/a				2:30:17	34
Muhan Hasi	Marathon	—N/a				DNF	
Xu Wang	Marathon	—N/a				2:23:08	24
Xie Wenjun	110 metres hurdles	13.44	3 Q	13.39	6	Did not advance	
Zhang Honglin	110 metres hurdles	DNF		Did not advance			
Cheng Wen	400 metres hurdles	49.56 PB	4 Q	49.62	8	Did not advance	
Mo Youxue; Xie Zhenye; Su Bingtian; Zhang Peimeng	4 × 100 metres relay	37.92 AR	3 Q	—N/a		38.01	2nd place, silver medalist(s)
Cai Zelin	20 kilometres walk	—N/a				1:20:42	5
Chen Ding	20 kilometres walk	—N/a				1:21:39	9
Wang Zhen	20 kilometres walk	—N/a				1:19:29	2nd place, silver medalist(s)
Wu Qianlong	50 kilometres walk	—N/a				3:51:35	14
Yu Wei	50 kilometres walk	—N/a				3:45:21 PB	7
Zhang Lin	50 kilometres walk	—N/a				3:44:39 PB	6

Field events

Athlete	Event	Qualification		Final	
Athlete	Event	Distance	Position	Distance	Position
Wang Yu	High jump	2.26	18	Did not advance	
Zhang Guowei	High jump	2.31	1 Q	2.33	2nd place, silver medalist(s)
Yao Jie	Pole vault	5.65 PB	22	Did not advance	
Zhang Wei	Pole vault	5.55	28	Did not advance	
Gao Xinglong	Long jump	8.11	5	8.14 SB	4
Li Jinzhe	Long jump	8.10	6	8.10	5
Wang Jianan	Long jump	8.12	4	8.18	3rd place, bronze medalist(s)
Cao Shuo	Triple jump	16.66	15	Did not advance	
Dong Bin	Triple jump	16.44	18	Did not advance	
Xu Xiaolong	Triple jump	16.19	24	Did not advance	
Zhao Qinggang	Javelin throw	79.47 SB	17	Did not advance	

=== Women ===
Track and road events

Athlete	Event	Heat		Semifinal		Final	
Athlete	Event	Result	Rank	Result	Rank	Result	Rank
Wei Yongli	100 metres	11.28 PB	4 q	11.27 PB	8	Did not advance	
Liang Xiaojing	200 metres	23.57 PB	7	Did not advance			
Zhao Jing	800 metres	2:03.08 SB	6	Did not advance			
He Yinli	Marathon	—N/a				2:45:05	37
Wang Xueqin	Marathon	—N/a				2:41:42	28
Ding Changqin	Marathon	—N/a				2:33:04	16
Wu Shuijiao	100 metres hurdles	13.09	4 Q	13.06	7	Did not advance	
Xiao Xia	400 metres hurdles	58.12	7	Did not advance			
Zhang Xinyan	3000 metres steeplechase	10:13.25	14	—N/a		Did not advance	
Nie Jingjing	20 kilometres walk	—N/a				1:32:40	17
Lü Xiuzhi	20 kilometres walk	—N/a				1:27:45	2nd place, silver medalist(s)
Liu Hong	20 kilometres walk	—N/a				1:27:45	1st place, gold medalist(s)
Liang Xiaojing; Kong Lingwei; Lin Huijun; Wei Yongli	4 × 100 metres relay	43.18	10	—N/a		Did not advance	
Huang Guifen; Wang Huan; Li Xue; Cheng Chong	4 × 400 metres relay	3:34.98	16	—N/a		Did not advance	

Field events

Athlete	Event	Qualification		Final	
Athlete	Event	Distance	Position	Distance	Position
Zheng Xingjuan	High jump	1.80	=26	Did not advance	
Li Ling	Pole vault	4.55	=11 q	4.60	9
Ren Mengqian	Pole vault	4.15	=25	Did not advance	
Lu Minjia	Long jump	6.01	30	Did not advance	
Li Xiaohong	Triple jump	13.52	21	Did not advance	
Li Yanmei	Triple jump	13.57	20	Did not advance	
Wang Wupin	Triple jump	13.48	23	Did not advance	
Gao Yang	Shot put	18.21	9 q	19.04 PB	5
Gong Lijiao	Shot put	19.11	3 Q	20.30	2nd place, silver medalist(s)
Guo Tianqian	Shot put	17.10	16	Did not advance	
Lu Xiaoxin	Discus throw	58.55	21	Did not advance	
Su Xinyue	Discus throw	61.68	10 q	62.90	8
Tan Jian	Discus throw	59.84	16	Did not advance	
Liu Tingting	Hammer throw	67.07	22	Did not advance	
Wang Zheng	Hammer throw	73.06	3 Q	73.83	5
Zhang Wenxiu	Hammer throw	72.92 SB	4 Q	76.33 SB	2nd place, silver medalist(s)
Li Lingwei	Javelin throw	65.07 SB	2 Q	64.10	5
Lu Huihui	Javelin throw	63.15	10 q	66.13 AR	2nd place, silver medalist(s)
Zhang Li	Javelin throw	61.80 SB	14	Did not advance	
