= Matthew Forgues =

American racewalker

Personal information
- Born: April 17, 1992 (age 34) Boothbay, Maine, U.S.
- Education: Goucher College (B.A.)

Sport
- Country: United States
- Sport: Racewalking
- Event: 50km Race Walk
Medal record
USA Outdoor Track and Field Championships
Bronze medal – third place	2017 Sacramento	50 km walk
Silver medal – second place	2018 Des Moines	50 km walk
Gold medal – first place	2019 Des Moines	50 km walk

Matthew Forgues (born April 17, 1992) is an American racewalker. Forgues earned gold for the 50 kilometres race walk at the 2019 USA Outdoor Track and Field Championships. Forgues was runner up in the 50 km walk at the 2020 United States Olympic Trials in Santee, California in a time of 4:14:42.

== Early life and education ==
Forgues was born on April 17, 1992, in from Boothbay, Maine, to Linda and Michael Forgues. He began racewalking at seven years old. His older sister Lauren is also a racewalker.

Forgues attended Boothbay Region High School. He earned a bachelor's degree in psychology from Goucher College in 2014. While at Goucher, Forgues studied abroad in Santiago, Chile, where he ran in the Santiago Marathon.

== Career ==
In 2010, Forgues earned a spot on the U.S. junior national racewalk team. In 2011, Forgues came in fourth in NAIA's 5,000-meter championships. He placed fifth in the 50 kilometer race walk at the 2015 USA Outdoor Track and Field Championships. At the 2016 USA Outdoor Track and Field Championships, he placed fourth. He earned third at the same event in 2017. In September 2017, Forgues won the 40 kilometer racewalk at the National Championships. Forgues earned silver for the 50 kilometres race walk at the 2018 USA Outdoor Track and Field Championships. In an international competition in Monterrey, Mexico, he came in 8th place. In January 2019, Forgues won his first 50 km National title at the 2019 USA 50 km Race Walk Championships. Forgues is currently training for the 2020 Summer Olympics.

After college graduation, Forgues taught at Standing Rock Indian Reservation where he resumed racewalking. He is a full-time educator at Whole Foods Market in San Diego.

== Achievements ==
Year	Competition	Venue	Position	Event	Notes
Representing the United States
2008	World Championships	Cheboksary, Russia	51st	10 km	47:46
2009	Pan Am Cup	San Salvador, El Salvador	13th	10 km	50:10
2009	Pan Am Junior Championships	Port of Spain, Trinidad and Tobago	9th	10 km	48:42
2016	World Championships	Rome, Italy	97th	20 km	1:35:42
2017	US National Championships	Santee, United States	3rd	50 km	4:31:40
2017	Pan Am Cup	Lima, Peru	11th	50 km	4:29:14
2018	World Team Championships	Taicang, China	46th	50 km	4:18:17
2018	US National Championships	Santee, United States	2nd	50 km	4:23:28
2019	Pan Am Cup	Lazaro Cardenas, Mexico	12th	50 km	4:15:22
2019	US National Championships	Santee, United States	1st	50 km	4:27:28
2019	Pan Am Games	Lima, Peru	5th	50 km	4:19:28
2020	US Olympic Trials	Santee, United States	2nd	50 km	4:14:42

== Personal life ==
Forgues ran a marathon in New York. He is gay and married to Manuel Martinez. He is lactose intolerant.
