= Muhan Hasi =

Chinese long-distance runner

Personal information
- Born: 27 November 1989 (age 36)

Sport
- Country: China
- Sport: Track and field
- Event: long-distance running
- Updated on 29 August 2015

Muhan Hasi (Chinese: 哈斯木汗, an ethnic Kazakh born 27 November 1989 in Xinjiang province) is a male Chinese long-distance runner. He competed in the marathon event at the 2015 World Championships in Athletics in Beijing, China.

== See also ==
- China at the 2015 World Championships in Athletics
