= Sha'Keela Saunders =

American long jumper

Sha'keela Saunders
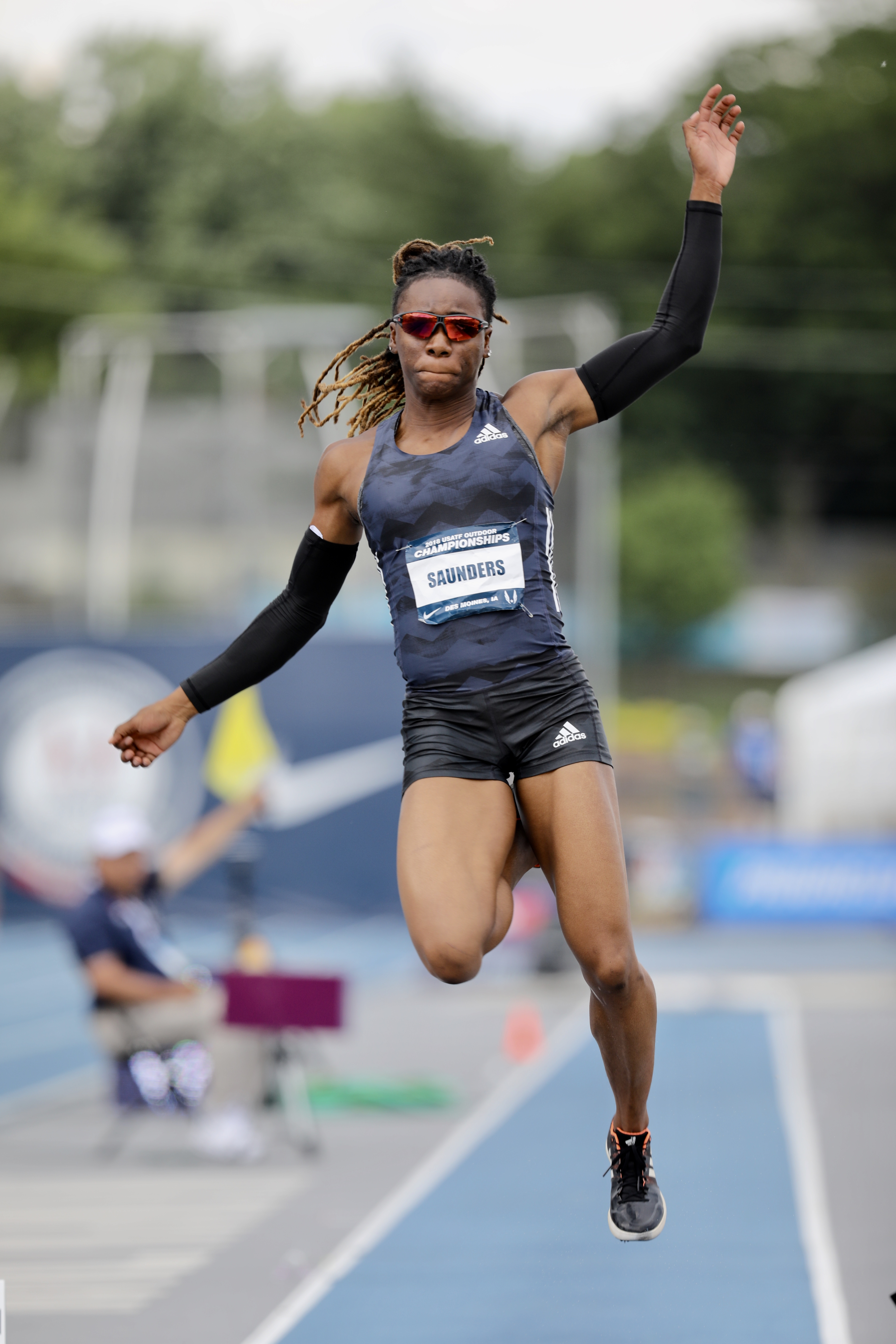

Personal information
- Born: December 12, 1993 (age 32) Elizabeth City, North Carolina, U.S.
- Height: 1.68 m (5 ft 6 in)

Sport
- Country: United States
- Sport: Track and field
- Event: Long jump
- College team: University of Kentucky
- Turned pro: 2017
- Coached by: Edrick Floréal

Achievements and titles
- Personal best: 6.90 m (22 ft 8 in)
Medal record
Women's athletics
Representing the United States
World Championships
	2017 London	Long jump
NACAC Championships
Gold medal – first place	2018 Toronto	Long jump

Sha'Keela Saunders (born December 12, 1993) is an American track and field athlete who competes in the long jump. Saunders finished third at the long jump final at the 2017 IAAF Diamond League and 2018 IAAF Diamond League. She represented her country at the 2017 World Championships in Athletics and won gold at NACAC Championships.

== Professional career ==
In Fall 2022, coach Sha'Keela Saunders joined Hampton University track and field staff.

Year	Competition	Venue	Position	Event	Notes
2017	World Championships	London, United Kingdom	21st (q)	Long jump	6.32 m (20 ft 9 in)
2018	NACAC Championships	Toronto, Canada	1st	Long jump	6.60 m (21 ft 8 in)
2019	World Championships	Doha, Qatar	9th	Long jump	6.54 m (21 ft 5 in)

=== National championships ===
Year	Competition	Venue	Position	Event	Notes
2022	USA Outdoor Track and Field Championships	Eugene, Oregon	6th	Long jump	6.51 m (21 ft 4 in)
2022	2022 USA Indoor Track and Field Championships	Spokane, Washington	3rd	Long jump	6.48 m (21 ft 3 in)
2021	United States Olympic trials	Eugene, Oregon	6th	Long jump	6.71 m (22 ft 0 in)
2019	USA Outdoor Track and Field Championships	Des Moines, Iowa	3rd	Long jump	6.78 m (22 ft 3 in)
2018	USA Outdoor Track and Field Championships	Des Moines, Iowa	1st	Long jump	6.54 m (21 ft 5 in)
2017	USA Outdoor Track and Field Championships	Sacramento, California	3rd	Long jump	6.92 m (22 ft 8 in)
2016	USA Olympic Trials	Eugene, Oregon	4th	Long jump	6.89 m (22 ft 7 in)
2015	USA Outdoor Track and Field Championships	Eugene, Oregon	5th	Long jump	6.75 m (22 ft 2 in)
2014	USA Outdoor Track and Field Championships	Hornet Stadium (Sacramento)	7th	Long jump	6.42 m (21 ft 1 in)

== University of Kentucky ==
Sha'Keela Saunders is a 2017 NCAA Division I Indoor track and field Long jump champion. Sha'Keela Saunders earned 13-time NCAA Division I All-America honors. Sha'Keela Saunders first broke the University of Kentucky Wildcats school record in the long jump for the first time 6.53 m (21 ft 5 in) en route to a first-place finish at the 2015 University of Kentucky Rod McCravy Memorial Track & Field Meet at Southeastern Conference for Women's Indoor Track and Field. Sha'Keela Saunders set the University of Kentucky Wildcats school record in the Long jump in 6.90 m (22 ft 8 in) in 2017 - a performance thank ranked / placed her in third on the all-time collegiate indoor list.

Sha'Keela Saunders improved on the University of Kentucky Wildcats school record in the Triple jump 13.32 m (43 ft 8 in) but in the same meet (2017 SEC Outdoor Championship on ESPNU) her teammate Marie Josée Ebwea Bile improved on that record 13.39 m (43 ft 11 in). Saunders was named to the Bowerman Award watch list in 2017.

Year	Conference indoor	NCAA indoor	Conference Outdoor	NCAA Outdoor
2017	Long Jump 6.81 m (22 ft 4 in) 1st Triple Jump 13.32 m (43 ft 8 in) 7th 4×400 meters 3:36.25 5th	Long Jump 6.90 m (22 ft 8 in) 1st 12.80 m (42 ft 0 in) 13th	Long Jump 6.75 m (22 ft 2 in) 2nd Triple Jump 12.15 m (39 ft 10 in) 13th 4×400 meters 3:35.56 6th	Long Jump 6.48 m (21 ft 3 in) 5th 4×400 meters 3:40.20 21st
2016	Long Jump 6.59 m (21 ft 7 in) 3rd Triple Jump 12.56 m (41 ft 2 in) 10th	Long Jump 6.56 m (21 ft 6 in) 2nd Triple Jump 13.01 m (42 ft 8 in) 8th	Long Jump 6.61 m (21 ft 8 in) 2nd Triple Jump 13.19 m (43 ft 3 in) 5th	Triple Jump 13.21 m (43 ft 4 in) 9th
2015	Long Jump 6.55 m (21 ft 6 in) 1st Triple Jump 13.08 m (42 ft 11 in) 4th	Long Jump 6.53 m (21 ft 5 in) 2nd 13.08 m (42 ft 11 in) 6th	Long Jump 6.52 m (21 ft 5 in) 5th Triple Jump 12.48 m (40 ft 11 in) 10th	Long Jump 6.75 m (22 ft 2 in) 3rd
2014	Long Jump 6.20 m (20 ft 4 in) 4th 200 meters 24.22 24th	4×400 meters 3:37.69 12th	4×400 meters 3:34.93 4th Long Jump 5.96 m (19 ft 7 in) 10th Triple Jump 12.68 m (41 ft 7 in) 9th	Long Jump 6.43 m (21 ft 1 in) 2nd 4×400 meters 3:39.09 22nd 4×100 meters 45.05 18th

== Prep ==
Saunders is a 2012 graduate of Nansemond River High School in Virginia.
