= Athletics at the 2022 Asian Games – Men's marathon =

Men's marathon at the 2022 Asian Games
- Venue: Qiantang River Green Belt
- Date: 5 October 2023
- Competitors: 18 from 13 nations

Medalists
gold medal	He Jie	China
silver medal	Han Il-ryong	North Korea
bronze medal	Yang Shaohui	China

The men's marathon competition at the 2022 Asian Games took place on 5 October 2023 at the Qiantang River Green Belt, Hangzhou.

== Schedule ==
All times are China Standard Time (UTC+08:00)

Date	Time	Event
Thursday, 5 October 2023	07:00	Final

== Records ==
Prior to this competition, the existing world, Asian and Games records were as follows.

World Record	Eliud Kipchoge (KEN)	2:01:09	Berlin, Germany	25 September 2022
Asian Record	El-Hassan El-Abbassi (BRN)	2:04:43	Valencia, Spain	2 December 2018
Games Record	Takeyuki Nakayama (JPN)	2:08:21	Seoul, South Korea	5 October 1986

== Results ==
Legend

- DNF — Did not finish

Rank	Athlete	Time	Notes
1st place, gold medalist(s)	He Jie (CHN)	2:13:02	
2nd place, silver medalist(s)	Han Il-ryong (PRK)	2:13:27	
3rd place, bronze medalist(s)	Yang Shaohui (CHN)	2:13:39	
4	Toshiki Sadakata (JPN)	2:13:51	
5	Shumi Dechasa (BRN)	2:13:51	
6	Yohei Ikeda (JPN)	2:15:04	
7	Shim Jung-sub (KOR)	2:16:58	
8	Man Singh (IND)	2:16:59	
9	Shokhrukh Davlatov (UZB)	2:17:49	
10	Dambadarjaagiin Gantulga (MGL)	2:18:03	
11	Park Min-ho (KOR)	2:18:12	
12	Appachangada Belliappa (IND)	2:20:52	
13	Agus Prayogo (INA)	2:20:53	
14	Rajan Rokaya (NEP)	2:23:17	
15	Jamsrangiin Olonbayar (MGL)	2:23:54	
16	Shadrack Koech (KAZ)	2:24:58	
—	Mohammed Shaween (KSA)	DNF	
—	Ilya Tyapkin (KGZ)	DNF	
