= Han Il-ryong =

North Korean runner (born 2000)

Personal information
- Nationality: North Korean
- Born: 29 April 2000 (age 26)

Sport
- Event: Marathon
Medal record
Men's athletics
Representing North Korea
Asian Games
Silver medal – second place	2022 Hangzhou	Marathon

Han Il-ryong (Korean: 한일룡; born 29 April 2000) is a North Korean long-distance runner. He placed 2nd in the marathon at the 2022 Asian Games and competed for North Korea in the marathon at the 2024 Olympic Games.
