= Kori Carter =

American hurdler (born 1992)

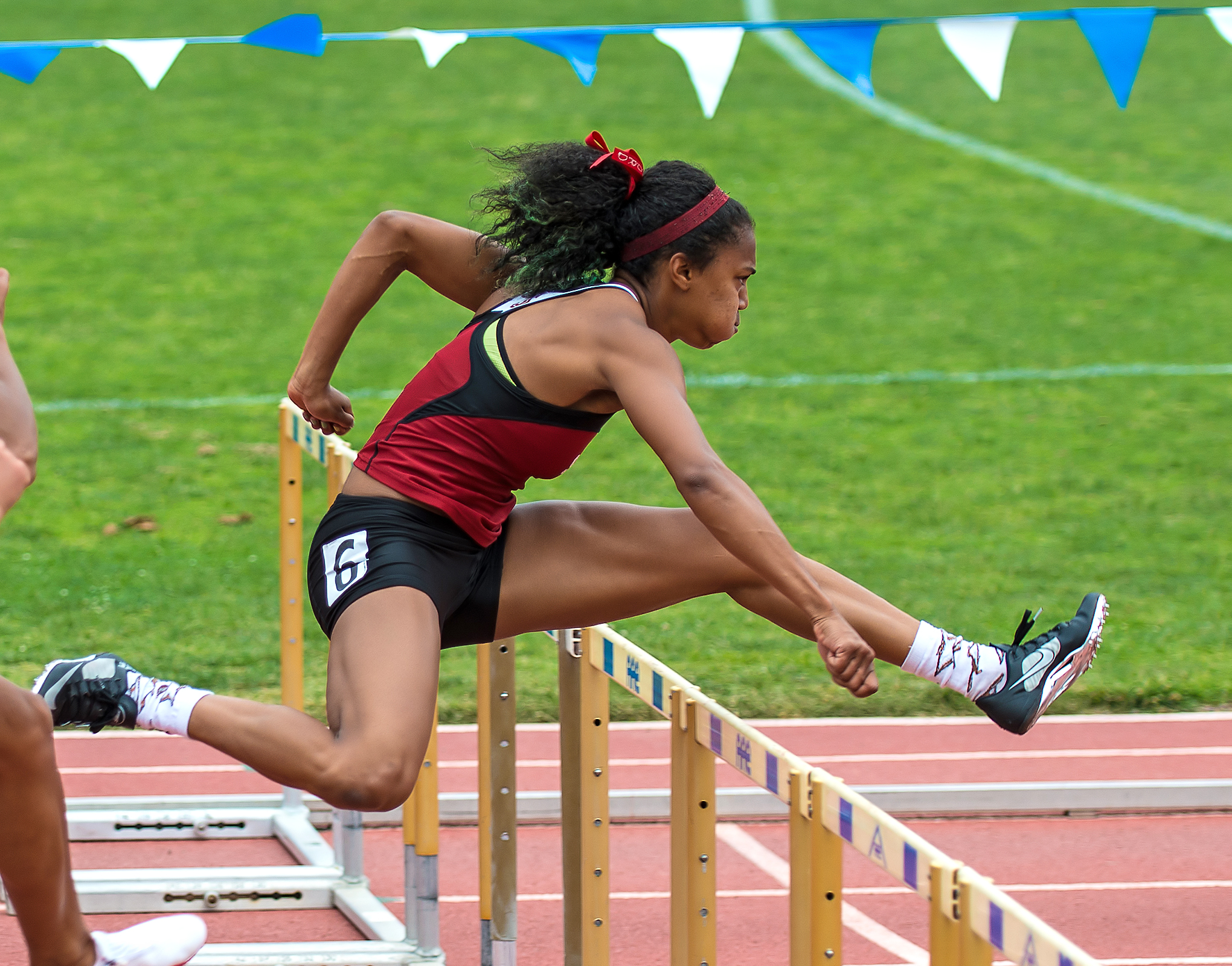
- Kori Carter in 2013

Personal information
- Nationality: American
- Born: June 3, 1992 (age 34) Claremont, California

Sport
- Country: United States
- Sport: Track and field
- Event: 400 metres hurdles
- College team: Stanford Cardinal

Achievements and titles
- Personal bests: 100 m: 11.57 s (Berkeley, CA 2011); 100 m Hurdles: 12.76 s (Los Angeles 2013); 400 m Hurdles: 52.95 s (Sacramento 2017)
Medal record
World Championships
Gold medal – first place	2017 London	400 m hurdles

Kori Carter (born June 3, 1992) is an American track and field athlete specializing in hurdle races, the World Champion in the 400 metres hurdles event in 2017. Kori Carter was a nine-time All-American at Stanford University sponsored by Jordan Brand.

== Prep ==
While at Claremont High School, in Claremont, California, Carter won the double hurdles title at the CIF California State Meet her junior and senior years (2009–10) (13.59/41.09 & 13.33/40.44), while winning the 300 hurdles in 2008. She made the final in both races all four years, the first of those as a freshman in 2007.

== NCAA ==
Kori Carter was a nine-time All-American at Stanford University sponsored by Nike.

As a Junior, on June 8, 2013, Carter won the NCAA Women's Outdoor Track and Field Championship in the 400 metres hurdles in collegiate record time of 53.21. That mark tied triple Olympic gold medalist Marie-José Pérec for number 20 on the all-time list. Carter was a 2013 Bowerman finalist. In 2023, she was inducted into the Stanford Athletics Hall of Fame.

== Professional ==
Kori ran 55.69 in 400 meters at 2013 USA Outdoor Track and Field Championships on June 21, 2013.

Carter won the 400 meter hurdles at the 2014 USA Outdoor Track and Field Championships.

At the 2015 USA Outdoor Track and Field Championships in Eugene, Oregon Kori placed 3rd in the 400 m hurdles in 54.41, to go on to represent the U.S. for the 400 m hurdles in the 2015 World Championships in Athletics in Beijing, China in August.

At the 2016 United States Olympic Trials (track and field) in Eugene, Oregon Kori placed 4th in the 400 m hurdles in 54.47 but failed to qualify for the 2016 Olympics in Rio.

At the 2017 USA Outdoor Track and Field Championships in Sacramento Kori placed 3rd in the 400 m hurdles in 52.95, to represent the U.S. for the 400 m hurdles in the 2017 World Championships in Athletics in London, where she won the world championship at 53.08.

At the 2018 USA Indoor Track and Field Championships in Albuquerque, New Mexico, Kori Carter placed 9th in the 60 m hurdles in 8.03.

At the 2018 USA Outdoor Track and Field Championships in Des Moines, Iowa Kori Carter placed 6th in the 100 m hurdles in 13.11.

=== International competitions ===
Year	Competition	Venue	Position	Event	Notes
Representing United States
2008	World Junior Championships	Bydgoszcz, Poland	7th in semifinal	400 metres hurdles	1:01.20
2009	World Youth Championships	Brixen, Italy	2nd	100 metres hurdles	13.26
2014	2014 IAAF Continental Cup	Marrakesh, Morocco	7th	400 metres hurdles	56.80
2015	2015 World Championships in Athletics	Beijing, China	semifinal	400 metres hurdles	56.22
2017	2017 World Championships in Athletics	London, United Kingdom	1st	400 metres hurdles	53.07
