= Zhang Lin (race walker) =

Chinese racewalker

Personal information
- Born: 11 November 1993 (age 32)

Sport
- Country: China
- Sport: Track and field
- Event: racewalking
- Updated on 29 August 2015

Zhang Lin (张琳; born 11 November 1993) is a male Chinese racewalker. He competed in the 50 kilometres walk event at the 2015 World Championships in Athletics in Beijing, China, finishing the 6th.

In 2020 he was sanctioned for doping violations until December 2027.

== See also ==
- China at the 2015 World Championships in Athletics
