= Katie Burnett =

American racewalker (born 1988)

Personal information
- Born: Kathleen "Queen" Marie Burnett; October 7, 1988 (age 37) Bellevue, Washington, United States
- Height: 5 ft 6.5 in (1.689 m)

Sport
- Sport: Track, Racewalking
- College team: William Penn University
- Turned pro: 2011

Achievements and titles
- Personal best(s): 5000 m Walk: 23:35.1 (2013); 10 km RW: 48:12.32 (2016); 20 km RW: 1:37:51 (2015) 50 km RW: 4:21:51 (2017)
Medal record
Representing United States
NACAC Championships
Bronze medal – third place	2025 Bahamas	20,000 m walk
- Updated on November 9, 2017

Katie Burnett (born October 7, 1988) is an American racewalker.

== High school career ==
Burnett was a two-time state meet placer at Desert Ridge High School in Mesa, Arizona. Burnett placed second in the 2007 USATF Junior Olympics with a 3,000-meter race walk time of 16:32. Burnett placed fourth in the Arizona Interscholastic Association state track and field championship high jump at 5-0 and eighth in the shot put at 35-8, both as a senior in 2007.

== College career ==
Burnett threw the javelin a length of 131-6.75 at NCAA Division I for the University of Arizona in 2008.

Burnett is a six-time National Association of Intercollegiate Athletics All-American race walker at William Penn University and earned another All-America award at the national NAIA track and field championship in the javelin as a senior in 2011.

== USA National Championships ==
Burnett placed 5th at the 2011 USA Outdoor Track and Field Championships 20 km. Burnett placed 1st at the 2011 USA Outdoor Track and Field Championships 50 km.

Burnett placed 4th at the 2013 USA Outdoor Track and Field Championships 20 km. Burnett placed 1st at the 2013 USA Outdoor Track and Field Championships 30 km.

Burnett placed 3rd at the 2015 USA Outdoor Track and Field Championships 20 km.

Burnett placed third in 20 km at 2016 United States Olympic Trials.

On January 28, 2017 in Santee, California - In her first 50 km, Burnett (after training in El Cajon, California) won the 2017 US National title Saturday afternoon, and also set new American records in the 40 km and 50 km at the USATF 50K Race Walk Championships.

On June 23, 2017, Burnett placed 4th at the 2017 USA Outdoor Track and Field Championships 20 km in a time of 1:38:39.60.

On August 13, 2017, Katie Burnett shatters American record in women’s 50 km race walk in London at the World Championship.

In 2019, she competed in the women's 50 kilometres walk at the 2019 World Athletics Championships held in Doha, Qatar. She finished in 17th place.

== Competition record ==
Year	Competition	Venue	Place	Time
2025	2025 NACAC Championships	Freeport, Bahamas	3rd	1:45:16
2022	2022 World Athletics Race Walking Team Championships	Muscat, Oman	40th	1:41:50
2019	2019 World Athletics Championships	Doha	17th	5:23:05
2019	2019 Pan American Games	Lima	10th	DNF
2019	Pan American Race Walking Cup	Lázaro Cárdenas, Mexico	7th	4:50:27
2017	2017 World Championships	London	4th	4:21:51 AR
2015	Pan American Race Walking Cup	Arica, Chile	22nd	1:45:24
2014	IAAF World Race Walking Cup	Taicang, Jiangsu, China	78th	1:44:00
2013	Pan American Race Walking Cup	Ciudad de Guatemala, Guatemala	14th	1:45:15

== Coaching ==
As of 2021, Burnett coaches the Mountlake Terrace High School cross country and track teams.
