= Susan Randall =

American racewalker

Personal information
- Born: September 6, 1974 (age 51)

Sport
- Country: United States
- Sport: Racewalking

Susan Randall (born September 6, 1974) is an American racewalker. In 2017, she competed in the women's 50 kilometres walk event at the 2017 World Championships in Athletics held in London, United Kingdom.
