= China at the 1983 World Championships in Athletics =

- Flag of China
- WA code: CHN

in Helsinki, Finland August 7–14, 1983
- Competitors: 25 (15 men and 10 women) in 18 events
- Medals Ranked =21st: Gold 0 Silver 0 Bronze 1 Total 1

World Championships in Athletics appearances (overview)
- 1983; 1987; 1991; 1993; 1995; 1997; 1999; 2001; 2003; 2005; 2007; 2009; 2011; 2013; 2015; 2017; 2019; 2022; 2023

China competed at the 1983 World Championships in Athletics in Helsinki, Finland, from August 7 to 14, 1983.

== Medalists ==
Medal	Athlete	Event
Bronze	Zhu Jianhua	Men's high jump

== Results ==
=== Men ===
Track and road events

Athlete	Event	Heat		Semifinal		Final	
Athlete	Event	Result	Rank	Result	Rank	Result	Rank
Yu Zhicheng	110 metres hurdles	14.43	26	Did not advance			
Wang Shaoming; He Baodang; Cai Jianming; Yan Guoqiang	4 × 100 metres relay	DQ		Did not advance			
Jiang Shaohong	20 kilometres walk	—				1:31:43	43
Li Guangxing	20 kilometres walk	—				1:31:02	40
Zhang Fuxin	20 kilometres walk	—				DNS	
Zhang Fuxin	50 kilometres walk	—				4:35:46	25
Dai Mingxi	50 kilometres walk	—				4:30:28	24

Field events

Athlete	Event	Qualification		Final	
Athlete	Event	Distance	Position	Distance	Position
Zhu Jianhua	High jump	2.24	=1 Q	2.29	3rd place, bronze medalist(s)
Liang Weiqiang	Pole vault	—		5.25	=15
Liu Yuhuang	Long jump	7.77	16	Did not advance	
Zou Zhenxian	Triple jump	16.17	16	Did not advance	
Li Weinan	Discus throw	51.72	25	Did not advance	
Xie Yingqi	Hammer throw	65.54	27	Did not advance	

=== Women ===
Track and road events

Athlete	Event	Heat		Quarterfinal		Semifinal		Final	
Athlete	Event	Result	Rank	Result	Rank	Result	Rank	Result	Rank
Dai Jianhua	100 metres hurdles	13.97	31 q	14.07	31	Did not advance			
Liu Guihua	400 metres hurdles	59.39	27	—		Did not advance			
Wu Jinmei	Marathon	—						DNF	

Field events

Athlete	Event	Qualification		Final	
Athlete	Event	Distance	Position	Distance	Position
Yang Wenqin	High jump	1.87	=8 q	1.84	=10
Zheng Dazhen	High jump	1.87	=8 q	1.80	18
Donghuo Huang	Long jump	5.90	20	Did not advance	
Li Meisu	Shot put	16.91	14	Did not advance	
Shen Lijuan	Shot put	16.99	13	Did not advance	
Li Xiaohui	Discus throw	54.58	16	Did not advance	
Xin Xiaoli	Javelin throw	52.52	19	Did not advance	
