= 2017 World Championships in Athletics – Women's 50 kilometres walk =

Women's 50 kilometres walk at the 2017 World Championships
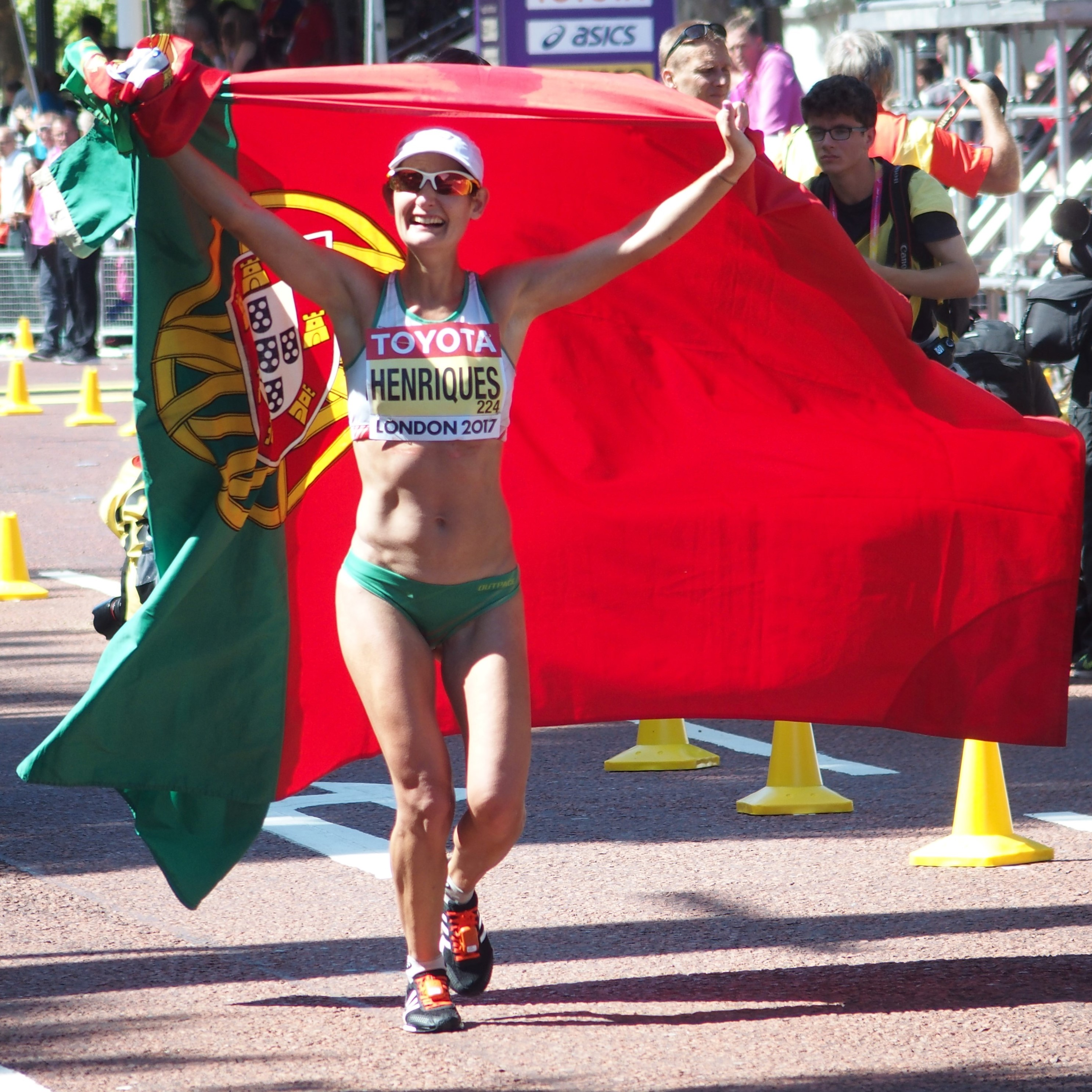
- Inês Henriques, the champion.
- Venue: Olympic Stadium
- Dates: 13 August (final)
- Competitors: 7 from 4 nations
- Winning time: 4:05:56

Medalists
gold medal	Inês Henriques	Portugal
silver medal	Yin Hang	China
bronze medal	Yang Shuqing	China

The women's 50 kilometres walk at the 2017 World Championships in Athletics was held on a 2 kilometre course comprising lengths of The Mall between Buckingham Palace and Admiralty Arch on 13 August.

== Summary ==
This was the first time women were offered this event in the world championships, finally equalizing all events for both genders. Only seven women toed the start line. With the event in its infancy, Inês Henriques (POR) had set the world record in January.

From the start, Henriques was dominating the race though Yin Hang (CHN) was with her virtually stride for stride through the halfway point. Two years prior to this becoming an IAAF ratified event, Erin Taylor-Talcott held the world record. Here she was disqualified early on, after the 5k mark. Behind the lead pack, a chase pack formed by Yang Shuqing (CHN), Katie Burnett (USA) and Nair da Rosa (BRA) walking closely together past 15k before da Rosa fell off the pace. Shortly after the half way mark, Burnett fell off Yang's pace, but she didn't go away. By 35k, Burnett was 50 seconds behind Yang, but she pulled it back, getting within breathing room of Yang as the race was closing in the last 5k.

Henriques continued to widen her lead to over three minutes on Yin. Yin managed to pull back a few seconds over the final 5k, finishing less than a minute short of Henriques' previous world record, but Henriques took two and a half minutes off of that record with this win in 4:05:56. After a scare, Yang opened up a minute over the last 5k on Burnett for bronze. Both silver medalist Yin and fourth place Burnett set their respective continental records.

== Records ==
Before the competition records were as follows:

Record	Perf.	Athlete	Nat.	Date	Location
World	4:08:26	Inês Henriques	POR	15 Jan 2017	Porto de Mós, Portugal
Championship	New event				
World leading	4:08:26	Inês Henriques	POR	15 Jan 2017	Porto de Mós, Portugal
African	No registered time				
Asian Record	4:22:22	Yin Hang	CHN	5 Mar 2017	Huangshan, China
NACAC	4:26:37	Kathleen Burnett	USA	28 Jan 2017	Santee, United States
South American	4:39:28	Nair da Rosa	BRA	2 Oct 2016	Lima, Peru
European	4:08:26	Inês Henriques	POR	15 Jan 2017	Porto de Mós, Portugal
Oceanian	No registered time				

The following records were set at the competition:

Record	Perf.	Athlete	Nat.	Date
World	4:05:56	Inês Henriques	POR	13 Aug 2017
Championship	4:05:56	Inês Henriques	POR	13 Aug 2017
World leading	4:05:56	Inês Henriques	POR	13 Aug 2017
European	4:05:56	Inês Henriques	POR	13 Aug 2017
Portuguese	4:05:56	Inês Henriques	POR	13 Aug 2017
Asian	4:08:58	Yin Hang	CHN	13 Aug 2017
Chinese	4:08:58	Yin Hang	CHN	13 Aug 2017
NACAC	4:21:51	Kathleen Burnett	USA	13 Aug 2017
American	4:21:51	Kathleen Burnett	USA	13 Aug 2017

== Qualification standard ==
The standard to qualify automatically for entry was 4:30:00.

== Results ==
The final took place on 13 August at 07:46. The results were as follows:

Rank	Name	Nationality	Time	Notes
1st place, gold medalist(s)	Inês Henriques	Portugal	4:05:56	WR
2nd place, silver medalist(s)	Yin Hang	China	4:08:58	AR
3rd place, bronze medalist(s)	Yang Shuqing	China	4:20:49	PB
4	Kathleen Burnett	United States	4:21:51	AR
	Nair da Rosa	Brazil	DNF	Beyond time limit
	Susan Randall	United States	DNF	Beyond time limit
	Erin Taylor-Talcott	United States	DQ	R 230.6 (a)
