= 2017 World Championships in Athletics qualification standards =

The following marks are the qualification standards for the 2017 World Championships in Athletics. The standards have been changed again from the 2015 standards. Each country may send a maximum of four athletes who have attained the A qualification mark in each specific event. A maximum of three athletes can compete in that event, with the sole exception of the relays, in which four of a possible six athletes may compete.

The qualification period ends on July 23, 2017, the date final entries are due. The start date for the qualification period was October 1, 2016 for all events except for 10,000 metres, Marathon, Race Walks, Relays and Combined Events which began on January 1, 2016.

== Wild Card ==
Area Champions (i.e. athletes who have won an event at their continental level championships) are granted automatic entrance, irrespective of whether they have achieved the qualification marks. The reigning World Champion in each event is also granted a bye into the competition, and does not count as part of their country's quota of athletes in that event. Furthermore, host countries may enter one unqualified athlete if no one of the respective nationality has achieved the required mark.

== Target ==
The IAAF has a target for the number of athletes participating in each event. If there are not sufficient qualified entries in each event, the IAAF will invite the next highest ranked athletes to fill out the field, except in races 5,000 metres and longer. If a country does not have a qualified athlete in any events, one representative will be allowed to compete in a preliminary round of the 100 metres. The 100 metres targeted field size is not including the preliminary round.

== Qualification standards ==
Event	Men's	Women's	Field size
100 m	10.12	11.26	56
200 m	20.44	23.10	56
400 m	45.50	52.10	48
800 m	1:45.90	2:01.00	48
1500 m (or mile)	3:36.00; 3:53.40	4:07.50; 4:26.70	45
5000 m	13:22.60	15:22.00	40
10,000 m	27:45.00	32:15.00	no size qual. only
Marathon	2:19:00	2:45:00	no size qual. only
3000 m steeplechase	8:32.00	9:42.00	45
100 m hurdles	—	12.98	40
110 m hurdles	13.48	—	40
400 m hurdles	49.35	56.10	40
High jump	2.30 m	1.94 m	32
Pole vault	5.70 m	4.55 m	32
Long jump	8.15 m	6.75 m	32
Triple jump	16.80 m	14.10 m	32
Shot put	20.50 m	17.75 m	32
Discus throw	65.00 m	61.20 m	32
Hammer throw	76.00 m	71.00 m	32
Javelin throw	83.00 m	61.40 m	32
Heptathlon	—	6200 pts	32
Decathlon	8100 pts	—	32
20 km race walk	1:24:00	1:36:00	no size qual. only
50 km race walk	4:06:00	—	no size qual. only
4 × 100 m relay	Top 8 at 2017 IAAF World Relays plus top 8 ranked teams		
4 × 400 m relay	Top 8 at 2017 IAAF World Relays plus top 8 ranked teams		
