= Yang Shuqing =

Chinese racewalker

Personal information
- Born: 30 August 1996 (age 29)

Sport
- Country: China
- Sport: Athletics
- Event: 50 km Race Walk

Achievements and titles
- Personal best: 50 km walk – 4:20:49 (2017)
Medal record
Women's athletics
Representing China
World Championships
Bronze medal – third place	2017 London	50 km walk

Yang Shuqing (Chinese: 杨树青; born 30 August 1996) is a female Chinese race walker who specialises in the 50 kilometres race walk. She was the bronze medallist over 50 km at the 2017 World Championships in Athletics.

== Biography ==
She took part in the 2017 World Championships inaugural 50 km women's event on August 13, 2017 where she won the bronze medal in 4 h 20 min 49 s. The race saw the participation of just seven athletes, out of which only four officially finished.

== See also ==
- China at the 2017 World Championships in Athletics
