= He Jie (runner) =

Chinese long-distance runner

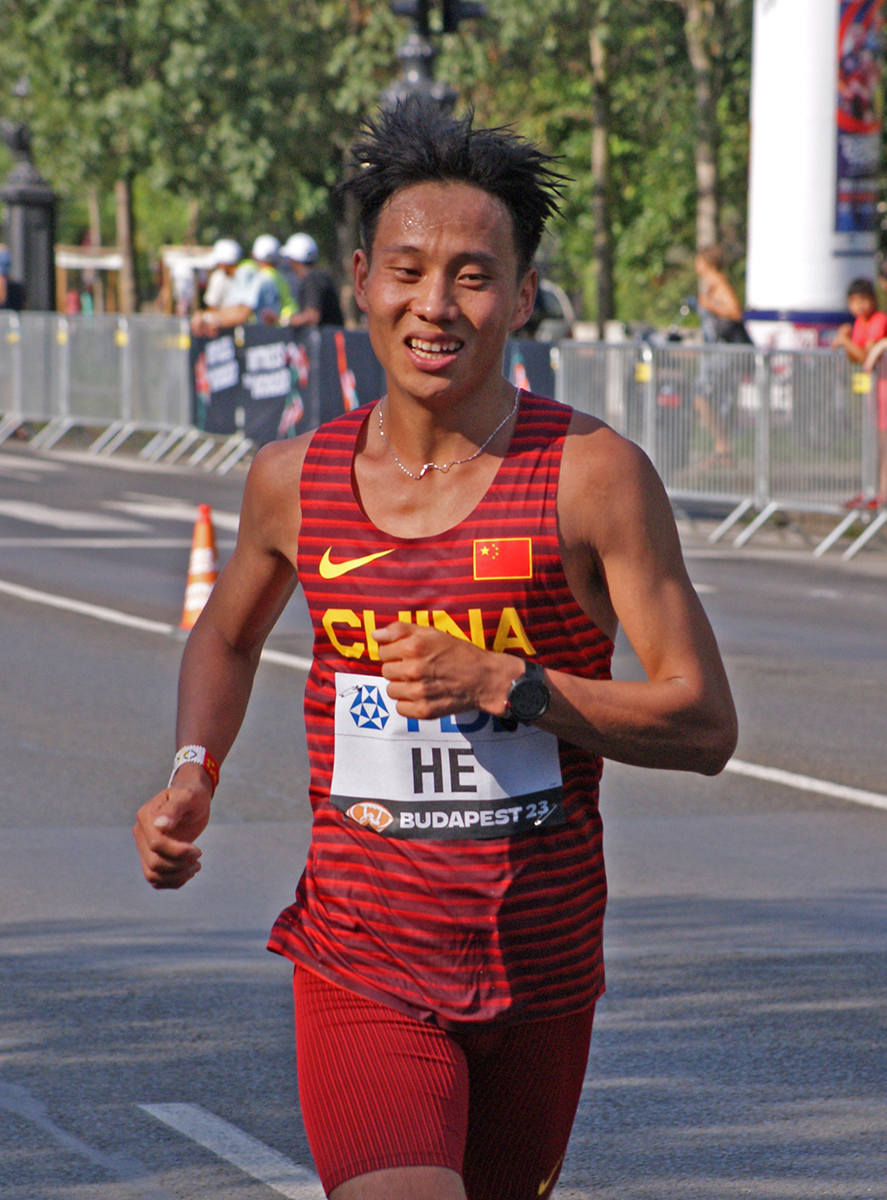
- He Jie in running in the 2023 Budapest Marathon

Personal information
- Born: December 27, 1998 (age 27) Pingluo County, Ningxia, China
Medal record
Men's athletics
Representing China
Asian Games
Gold medal – first place	2023 Hangzhou	Marathon

He Jie (Chinese: 何杰; pinyin: Hé Jié, born 27 December 1998) is a Chinese athlete from Pingluo County. He competes in long-distance running.

In 2023, he won the gold medal in the men's marathon at the postponed Asian Games. He is the current Chinese record holder in the marathon with a time of 2:06:57 set in Wuxi on 24 March 2024.

== 2024 Beijing Half Marathon win controversy ==
On 14 April 2024, He won the Beijing Half Marathon. His finish was controversial as three African runners ahead of him - Willy Mnangat (Kenyan), Robert Keter (Kenyan), and Dejene Hailu Bikila (Ethiopian) - appeared to let him win. Mnangat later said that he was entered as a pacemaker for He, not unusual in road races, and that he was never intended to be an actual competitor in the race. The African runners were not listed as pacemakers by the race organizers, but Mnangat said, "My agent from Kenya told me, when I was going to get the visa, that I am going to China to help the Chinese break the national record".

Pacemakers are used in various World Athletics Label Road Races, including the Beijing Half Marathon, and their use is permitted by World Athletics.

On 19 April 2024, He and the three pacemakers of Ethiopian and Kenyan nationalities who allegedly aided his final championship were disqualified by the committee of the 2024 Beijing Half Marathon with their trophies revoked.

=== International competition ===
Year	Competition	Venue	Position	Event	Notes
Representing China
2022	Berlin Marathon	Berlin, Germany	16th	Marathon	2:11:12
2022	Beijing Marathon	Beijing, China	3rd	Marathon	2:21:26
2023	Wuxi Marathon	Wuxi, China	2nd	Marathon	2:07:30
2023	Wuhan Marathon	Wuhan, China	1st	Marathon	2:12:35
2023	Liupanshui Marathon	Liupanshui, China	3rd	Marathon	2:15:40
2023	World Championships	Budapest, Hungary	44th	Marathon	2:19:48
2023	Asian Games	Hangzhou, China	1st	Marathon	2:13:02
2024	Xiamen Marathon	Xiamen, China	10th	Marathon	2:14:17
2024	Wuxi Marathon	Wuxi, China	4th	Marathon	2:06:57
2024	Olympic Games	Paris, France	67th	Marathon	2:22:31
2025	Tokyo Marathon	Tokyo, Japan	16th	Marathon	2:07:20
2025	World Championships	Tokyo, Japan	26th	Marathon	2:14:52
