= Erin Taylor-Talcott =

American racewalker

Personal information
- Born: Erin Taylor; May 21, 1978 (age 47)
- Spouse: Dave Talcott

Sport
- Country: United States
- Sport: Racewalking

Erin Taylor-Talcott (born May 21, 1978) is an American racewalker. She competed in the women's 50 kilometres walk event at the 2017 World Championships in Athletics held in London, United Kingdom.

Born and raised in the Greater Portland area, she attended Clackamas High School. She earned a degree in music performance from Rutgers University and a masters in music performance from Stony Brook University.
