= Wu Qianlong =

Chinese racewalker

Personal information
- Born: 30 January 1990 (age 36)

Sport
- Country: China
- Sport: Track and field
- Event: racewalking
- Updated on 29 August 2015

Wu Qianlong (吴钱龙; born 30 January 1990) is a male Chinese racewalker from Inner Mongolia. He competed in the 50 kilometres walk event at the 2015 World Championships in Athletics in Beijing, China, finishing the 14th.

== See also ==
- China at the 2015 World Championships in Athletics
