= Yin Hang (race walker) =

Chinese racewalker (born 1997)

Personal information
- Born: 7 February 1997 (age 29)

Sport
- Country: China
- Sport: Athletics
- Event(s): 20 km Race Walk; 50 km Race Walk

Achievements and titles
- Personal best(s): 20 km walk – 1:33:26 (2017); 50 km walk – 4:08:58 (2017)
Medal record
Women's athletics
Representing China
World Championships
| Silver medal – second place | 2017 London | 50 km walk |

Yin Hang (Chinese: 尹航; born 7 February 1997) is a female Chinese race walker who specialises in the 20 kilometres and 50 kilometres race walk. She was the silver medallist over 50 km at the 2017 World Championships in Athletics.

== Biography ==
She took part in the 2017 World Championships inaugural 50 km women's event on August 13, 2017 where she won the silver medal in 4 h 08 min 58 s thereby beating her previous Asian Record. The race saw the participation of just seven athletes, out of which only four officially finished.

== See also ==
- China at the 2017 World Championships in Athletics
