= Chinese Athletics Association =

National governing body for athletics in the People's Republic of China

- 中国田径协会
- Sport: Athletics
- Abbreviation: BAF
- Founded: 1954
- Affiliation: World Athletics
- Regional affiliation: Asian Athletics Association (AAA)
- Headquarters: Beijing

Official website
- www.athletics.org.cn
- (China)

The Chinese Athletics Association (CAA; Chinese: 中国田径协会) is the national governing body for the sport of athletics in the People's Republic of China. It became a member of the International Association of Athletics Federations in 1978 and is also a member of the Asian Athletics Association.

The headquarters is located at 2 Tiyuguan Road, Beijing; President: Duan Shijie, General Secretary: Du Zhaocai.

CAA was founded in Beijing in 1954. It is administered by the General Administration of Sport of China. The CAA has the corporate membership of the All-China Sports Federation. The CAA is recognized by the Chinese Olympic Committee.

Under the CAA there are seven committees, namely the Training Committee, the Tournament Committee, the Development Committee, the Publicity Committee, the Facility and Equipment Committee, the Medical Affairs Committee and the Secretariat. CAA also has 44 branches nationwide.

== See also ==
- List of Chinese records in athletics
- China at the World Athletics Championships
