= Yang Shaohui =

Chinese long-distance runner

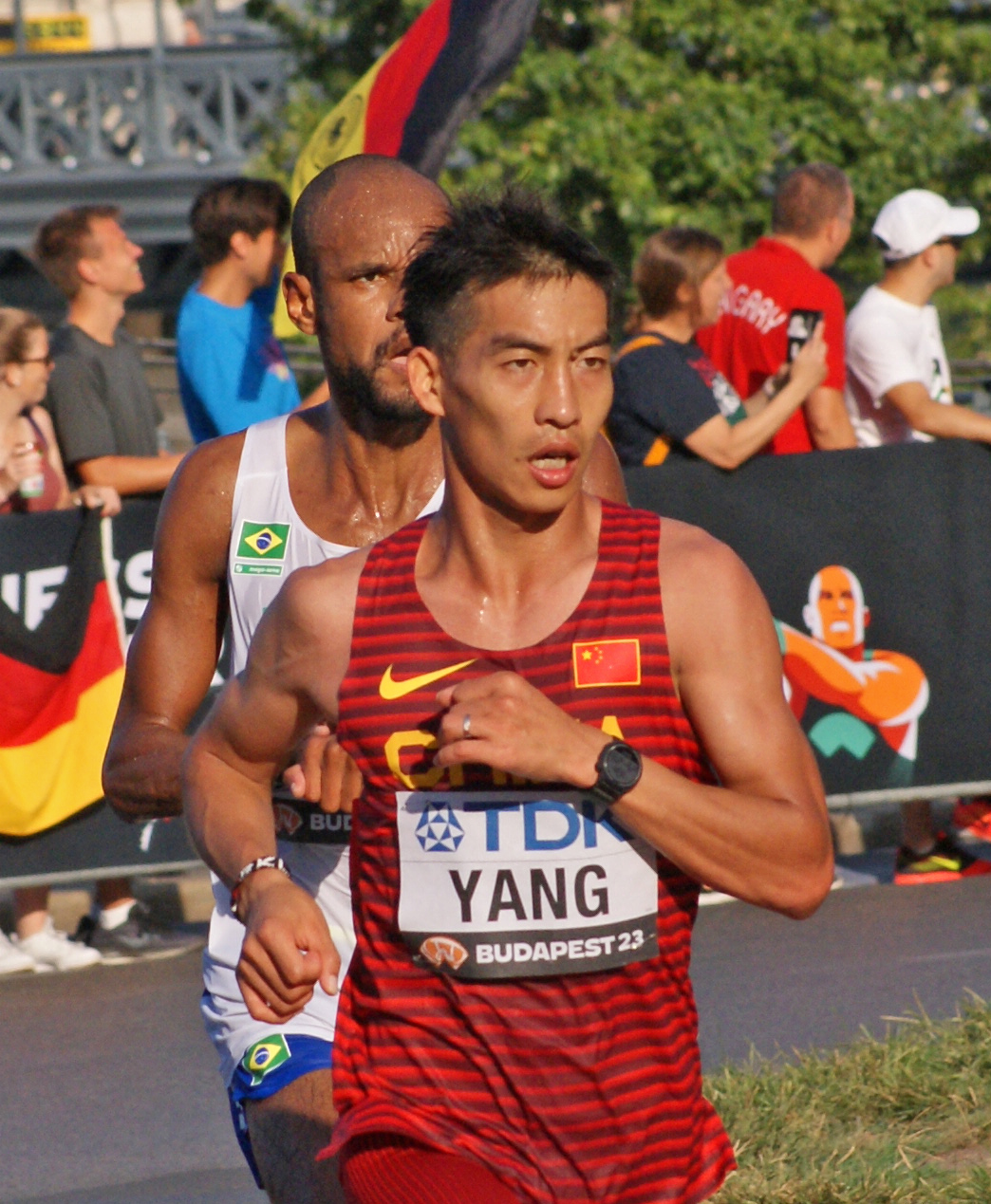

Personal information
- Born: 9 July 1992 (age 33)

Sport
- Country: China
- Sport: Long-distance running

Achievements and titles
- Personal bests: Half Marathon: 1:02:48 (Meishan 2024); Marathon: 2:07:09 (Fukuoka 2023)

Yang Shaohui (Chinese: 杨绍辉; born 9 July 1992) is a Chinese long-distance runner. He competed in the men's marathon at the 2019 World Athletics Championships held in Doha, Qatar. He finished in 20th place.

== Statistics ==
=== International competition ===
Year	Competition	Venue	Position	Event	Notes
Representing China
2014	Beijing Marathon	Beijing, China	7th	Marathon	2:20:31
2015	Chongqing Marathon	Chongqing, China	19th	Marathon	2:22:05
2016	Xiamen Marathon	Xiamen, China	12th	Marathon	2:21:46
2018	Hengshui Lake Marathon	Hengshui, China	9th	Marathon	2:17:42
2018	Suzhou Marathon	Suzhou, China	4th	Marathon	2:17:32
2019	World Championships	Doha, Qatar	20th	Marathon	2:15:17
2019	Beijing Marathon	Beijing, China	8th	Marathon	2:13:14
2019	Bao'an Marathon	Shenzhen, China	3rd	Marathon	2:14:12
2021	Olympic Games	Sapporo, Japan	19th	Marathon	2:14:58
2021	Macau Marathon	Macau, China	1st	Marathon	2:13:04
2022	World Championships	Eugene, Oregon, United States	31st	Marathon	2:11:56
2022	Chicago Marathon	Chicago, United States	32nd	Marathon	2:16:11
2022	Shanghai Marathon	Shanghai, China	1st	Marathon	2:16:04
2023	Wuxi Marathon	Wuxi, China	3rd	Marathon	2:07:49
2023	Wuhan Marathon	Wuhan, China	2nd	Marathon	2:12:37
2023	Taiyuan Marathon	Taiyuan, China	2nd	Marathon	2:10:12
2023	World Championships	Budapest, Hungary	37th	Marathon	2:17:12
2023	Asian Games	Hangzhou, China	3rd	Marathon	2:13:39
2023	Fukuoka Marathon	Fukuoka, Japan	2nd	Marathon	2:07:09
2024	Meishan Renshou Half Marathon	Meishan, China	7th	Half Marathon	1:02:48
2024	Wuxi Marathon	Wuxi, China	5th	Marathon	2:07:26
2024	Olympic Games	Paris, France	55th	Marathon	2:14:48
2024	Xi'an Marathon	Xi'an, China	3rd	Marathon	2:12:28
2024	Fukuoka Marathon	Fukuoka, Japan	11th	Marathon	2:12:38
2025	Xiamen Marathon	Xiamen, China	9th	Marathon	2:08:07
2025	Tokyo Marathon	Tokyo, Japan	24th	Marathon	2:09:34
2025	World Championships	Tokyo, Japan	30th	Marathon	2:15:35
