= 2024 World Athletics Rankings =

Individual rankings in athletics

2024 IAAF World Rankings
- Organizer: World Athletics
- Edition: 3rd

The 2024 World Athletics Rankings document the best-performing athletes in the sport of athletics, according to World Athletics' individual athlete ranking system. Individual athletes are assigned a points score best on an average of their best recent competition performances. The performance scoring is primarily based on the time or mark of the athlete, with additional points for their placement within the competition, along with some minor modifications based on the conditions. The world rankings are updated each Wednesday.

As of 29 October 2024, the number one ranked male athlete is Armand Duplantis with 1625 points, and the number one ranked female athlete is Faith Kipyegon with 1550 points.

== Overall rankings (top 10) ==
Men (as of 29 October 2024)
#	Athlete	Nation	Event(s)	Points
1	Armand Duplantis	Sweden (SWE)	Pole vault	1625
2	Jakob Ingebrigtsen	Norway (NOR)	1500 metres, 5000 metres	1523
3	Ryan Crouser	United States (USA)	Shot put	1520
4	Letsile Tebogo	Botswana (BOT)	100 metres, 200 metres	1519
5	Grant Holloway	United States (USA)	110 metres hurdles	1504
6	Alison dos Santos	Brazil (BRA)	400 metres hurdles	1504
7	Noah Lyles	United States (USA)	100 metres, 200 metres	1503
8	Kenneth Bednarek	United States (USA)	100 metres, 200 metres	1503
9	Emmanuel Wanyonyi	Kenya (KEN)	800 metres	1499
10	Mykolas Alekna	Lithuania (LTU)	Discus throw	1488

Women (as of 29 October 2024)
#	Athlete	Nation	Event(s)	Points
1	Faith Kipyegon	Kenya (KEN)	1500 metres, 5000 metres	1550
2	Beatrice Chebet	Kenya (KEN)	5000 metres, 10,000 metres	1545
3	Femke Bol	Netherlands (NED)	400 metres hurdles	1517
4	Julien Alfred	Saint Lucia (LCA)	100 metres, 200 metres	1506
5	Yaroslava Mahuchikh	Ukraine (UKR)	High jump	1494
6	Marileidy Paulino	Dominican Republic (DOM)	400 metres	1491
7	Winfred Yavi	Bahrain (BHR)	3000 metres steeplechase	1485
8	Sydney McLaughlin-Levrone	United States (USA)	400 metres hurdles	1484
9	Valarie Allman	United States (USA)	Discus throw	1483
10	Tigst Assefa	Ethiopia (ETH)	Marathon	1480

== Event rankings (top 10) ==
IAAF World Rankings, as of 29 October 2024.

=== 100 metres ===
Men

#	Athlete	Born	Points
1	(United States) Noah Lyles	18 Jul 1997	1466
2	(South Africa) Akani Simbine	21 Sep 1993	1437
3	(United States) Fred Kerley	7 May 1995	1425
4	(United States) Christian Coleman	6 Mar 1996	1414
5	(Jamaica) Kishane Thompson	17 Jul 2001	1412
6	(Botswana) Letsile Tebogo	7 Jun 2003	1409
7	(Italy) Marcell Jacobs	26 Sep 1994	1392
8	(Jamaica) Ackeem Blake	21 Jan 2002	1390
9	(Jamaica) Oblique Seville	16 Mar 2001	1367
10	(United States) Kenneth Bednarek	14 Oct 1998	1356

Women

#	Athlete	Born	Points
1	(Saint Lucia) Julien Alfred	10 Jun 2001	1473
2	(United States) Sha'Carri Richardson	25 Mar 2000	1431
3	(United Kingdom) Dina Asher-Smith	4 Dec 1995	1391
4	(United Kingdom) Daryll Neita	29 Aug 1996	1381
5	(United States) Tamari Davis	15 Feb 2003	1367
6	(Jamaica) Tia Clayton	17 Aug 2004	1362
7	(United States) Melissa Jefferson	21 Feb 2001	1360
8	(Ivory Coast) Marie Josée Ta Lou	18 Nov 1988	1359
9	(Poland) Ewa Swoboda	26 Jul 1997	1348
10	(Switzerland) Mujinga Kambundji	17 Jun 1992	1340

=== 200 metres ===
Men

#	Athlete	Born	Points
1	(Botswana) Letsile Tebogo	7 Jun 2003	1511
2	(United States) Kenneth Bednarek	14 Oct 1998	1498
3	(Dominican Republic) Alexander Ogando	3 May 2000	1420
4	(United States) Erriyon Knighton	29 Jan 2004	1418
5	(United States) Noah Lyles	18 Jul 1997	1397
6	(United States) Courtney Lindsey	18 Nov 1998	1369
7	(Liberia) Joseph Fahnbulleh	11 Sep 2001	1354
8	(United States) Kyree King	9 Jul 1994	1330
9	(Zimbabwe) Tapiwanashe Makarawu	14 Aug 2000	1312
10	(Jamaica) Andrew Hudson	14 Dec 1996	1307

Women

#	Athlete	Born	Points
1	(United States) Gabrielle Thomas	7 Dec 1996	1439
2	(United States) Brittany Brown	18 Apr 1995	1438
3	(Saint Lucia) Julien Alfred	10 Jun 2001	1400
4	(United Kingdom) Daryll Neita	29 Aug 1996	1391
5	(United Kingdom) Dina Asher-Smith	4 Dec 1995	1365
6	(United States) McKenzie Long	11 Jul 2000	1341
7	(Ivory Coast) Jessika Gbai	29 Dec 1998	1326
8	(United States) Anavia Battle	28 Mar 1999	1325
9	(Nigeria) Favour Ofili	31 Dec 2002	1315
10	(Switzerland) Mujinga Kambundji	17 Jun 1992	1300

=== 400 metres ===
Men

#	Athlete	Born	Points
1	(United Kingdom) Matthew Hudson-Smith	26 Oct 1994	1474
2	(Zambia) Muzala Samukonga	9 Dec 2002	1445
3	(United States) Quincy Hall	31 Jul 1998	1434
4	(Grenada) Kirani James	1 Sep 1992	1422
5	(Trinidad and Tobago) Jereem Richards	13 Jan 1994	1390
6	(United Kingdom) Charlie Dobson	20 Oct 1999	1373
7	(Belgium) Alexander Doom	25 Apr 1997	1373
8	(United States) Vernon Norwood	10 Apr 1992	1371
9	(Botswana) Bayapo Ndori	20 Jun 1999	1352
10	(United States) Christopher Bailey	29 May 2000	1347

Women

#	Athlete	Born	Points
1	(Dominican Republic) Marileidy Paulino	25 Oct 1996	1491
2	(Poland) Natalia Kaczmarek	17 Jan 1998	1430
3	(Bahrain) Salwa Eid Naser	23 May 1998	1412
4	(Republic of Ireland) Rhasidat Adeleke	29 Aug 2002	1406
5	(United States) Alexis Holmes	28 Jan 2000	1383
6	(Netherlands) Lieke Klaver	20 Aug 1998	1370
7	(United Kingdom) Amber Anning	18 Nov 2000	1358
8	(Barbados) Sada Williams	1 Dec 1997	1343
9	(Norway) Henriette Jæger	30 Jun 2003	1341
10	(Jamaica) Nickisha Pryce	7 Mar 2001	1324

=== 800 metres ===
Men

#	Athlete	Born	Points
1	(Kenya) Emmanuel Wanyonyi	1 Aug 2004	1489
2	(Algeria) Djamel Sedjati	3 May 1999	1485
3	(Canada) Marco Arop	20 Sep 1998	1464
4	(France) Gabriel Tual	9 Apr 1998	1417
5	(United States) Bryce Hoppel	5 Sep 1997	1416
6	(Spain) Mohamed Attaoui	26 Sep 2001	1389
7	(Kenya) Wycliffe Kinyamal	2 Jul 1997	1370
8	(Belgium) Eliott Crestan	22 Feb 1999	1368
9	(Botswana) Tshepiso Masalela	25 May 1999	1366
10	(Sweden) Andreas Kramer	13 Apr 1997	1346

Women

#	Athlete	Born	Points
1	(United Kingdom) Keely Hodgkinson	3 Mar 2002	1442
2	(Ethiopia) Tsigie Doguma	23 Feb 2001	1440
3	(Kenya) Mary Moraa	Jun 15 2000	1396
4	(South Africa) Prudence Sekgodiso	5 Jan 2002	1366
5	(United Kingdom) Jemma Reekie	6 Mar 1998	1361
6	(France) Rénelle Lamote	26 Dec 1993	1359
7	(United Kingdom) Georgia Bell	17 Oct 1993	1349
8	(Saint Vincent and the Grenadines) Shafiqua Maloney	27 Feb 1999	1340
9	(Jamaica) Natoya Goule-Toppin	16 Oct 1994	1338
10	(Ethiopia) Habitam Alemu	9 Jul 1997	1330

=== 1500 metres ===
Men

#	Athlete	Born	Points
1	(Norway) Jakob Ingebrigtsen	19 Sep 2000	1487
2	(United States) Yared Nuguse	1 Jun 1999	1452
3	(United States) Cole Hocker	6 Jun 2001	1449
4	(Kenya) Timothy Cheruiyot	20 Nov 1995	1401
5	(United States) Hobbs Kessler	15 Mar 2003	1399
6	(United Kingdom) Josh Kerr	8 Oct 1997	1379
7	(France) Azeddine Habz	19 Jul 1993	1375
8	(Kenya) Brian Komen	10 Aug 1998	1373
9	(Norway) Narve Gilje Nordås	30 Sep 1998	1368
10	(Kenya) Reynold Cheruiyot	30 Jul 2004	1353

Women

#	Athlete	Born	Points
1	(Kenya) Faith Kipyegon	10 Jan 1994	1502
2	(Ethiopia) Gudaf Tsegay	27 Jan 1997	1500
3	(Ethiopia) Diribe Welteji	May 13 2002	1478
4	(Australia) Jessica Hull	Oct 22 1996	1430
5	(Ethiopia) Freweyni Hailu	12 Feb 2001	1428
6	(Kenya) Nelly Chepchirchir	Jun 4 2003	1397
7	(Ethiopia) Birke Haylom	Jan 6 1997	1375
8	(United States) Nikki Hiltz	23 Oct 1994	1366
9	(Kenya) Susan Lokedi Ejore	9 Nov 1995	1363
10	(United Kingdom) Georgia Hunter Bell	Oct 17 1993	1360

=== 5000 metres ===
Men

#	Athlete	Born	Points
1	(Ethiopia) Hagos Gebrhiwet	11 May 1994	1450
2	(Norway) Jakob Ingebrigtsen	19 Sep 2000	1427
3	(Ethiopia) Berihu Aregawi	28 Feb 2001	1422
4	(Ethiopia) Yomif Kejelcha	1 Aug 1997	1413
5	(Ethiopia) Selemon Barega	20 Jan 2000	1393
6	(Switzerland) Dominic Lokinyomo Lobalu	16 Aug 1998	1380
7	(Ethiopia) Telahun Haile Bekele	13 May 1999	1376
8	(United States) Grant Fisher	22 Apr 1997	1367
9	(Ethiopia) Biniam Mehary	20 Dec 2006	1352
10	(Kenya) Ronald Kwemoi	19 Sep 1995	1351

Women

#	Athlete	Born	Points
1	(Kenya) Beatrice Chebet	5 Mar 2000	1491
2	(Ethiopia) Gudaf Tsegay	17 Jan 1997	1469
3	(Italy) Nadia Battocletti	12 Apr 2000	1396
4	(Ethiopia) Medina Eisa	Jan 3	1378
5	(Kenya) Agnes Ngetich	23 Jan 2001	1370
6	(Ethiopia) Birke Haylom	6 Jan 2006	1351
7	(Ethiopia) Hirut Meshesha	Jan 20 2001	1348
8	(Ethiopia) Tsigie Gebreselama	30 Sep 2000	1343
9	(Ethiopia) Ejgayehu Taye	10 Feb 2000	1343
10	(Netherlands) Sifan Hassan	1 Jan 1993	1337

=== 10,000 metres ===
Men

#	Athlete	Born	Points
1	(Uganda) Joshua Cheptegei	12 Sep 1996	1394
2	(Ethiopia) Berihu Aregawi	28 Feb 2001	1391
3	(United States) Grant Fisher	22 Apr 1997	1388
4	(Canada) Mohammed Ahmed	5 Jan 1991	1367
5	(Ethiopia) Yomif Kejelcha	1 Aug 1997	1352
6	(Kenya) Benard Kibet	25 Nov 1999	1340
7	(Ethiopia) Selemon Barega	20 Jan 2000	1338
8	(Uganda) Jacob Kiplimo	14 Nov 2000	1319
9	(South Africa) Adriaan Wildschutt	3 May 1998	1294
10	(United States) Nico Young	27 Jul 2002	1291

Women

#	Athlete	Born	Points
1	(Kenya) Beatrice Chebet	5 Mar 2000	1423
2	(Ethiopia) Gudaf Tsegay	23 Jan 1997	1421
3	(Italy) Nadia Battocletti	12 Apr 2000	1384
4	(Kenya) Margaret Kipkemboi	9 Feb 1993	1345
5	(Netherlands) Sifan Hassan	1 Jan 1993	1340
6	(Kenya) Lilian Kasait Rengeruk	3 May 1997	1336
7	(Ethiopia) Fotyen Tesfay	17 Feb 1998	1314
8	(Ethiopia) Tsigie Gebreselama	30 Sep 2000	1310
9	(United States) Weini Kelati	1 Dec 1996	1306
10	(Ethiopia) Mizan Alem	22 Jan 2002	1277

=== 110 & 100 metres hurdles ===
Men

#	Athlete	Born	Points
1	(United States) Grant Holloway	19 Nov 1997	1504
2	(United States) Daniel Roberts	13 Nov 1997	1441
3	(Jamaica) Rasheed Broadbell	13 Aug 2000	1403
4	(Italy) Lorenzo Simonelli	1 Jun 2002	1401
5	(France) Sasha Zhoya	25 Jun 2002	1399
6	(United States) Freddie Crittenden	3 Aug 1994	1398
7	(Spain) Enrique Llopis	15 Oct 2000	1381
8	(Japan) Rachid Muratake	6 Feb 2002	1374
9	(United States) Trey Cunningham	26 Aug 1998	1363
10	(Jamaica) Hansle Parchment	17 Jun 1990	1362

Women

#	Athlete	Born	Points
1	(Puerto Rico) Jasmine Camacho-Quinn	21 Aug 1996	1464
2	(United States) Masai Russell	17 Jun 2000	1431
3	(France) Cyréna Samba-Mayela	31 Oct 2000	1428
4	(The Bahamas) Devynne Charlton	26 Nov 1995	1424
5	(Jamaica) Ackera Nugent	29 Apr 2002	1413
6	(United States) Grace Stark	6 May 2001	1409
7	(Netherlands) Nadine Visser	9 Feb 1995	1404
8	(United States) Alaysha Johnson	20 Jul 1996	1366
9	(Jamaica) Danielle Williams	14 Sep 1992	1356
10	(Poland) Pia Skrzyszowska	20 Apr 2001	1353

=== 400 metres hurdles ===
Men

#	Athlete	Born	Points
1	(Brazil) Alison dos Santos	3 Jun 2000	1504
2	(Norway) Karsten Warholm	28 Feb 1996	1486
3	(United States) Rai Benjamin	27 Jul 1997	1484
4	(British Virgin Islands) Kyron McMaster	3 Jan 1997	1414
5	(Qatar) Abderrahman Samba	5 Sep 1995	1407
6	(France) Clément Ducos	4 Mar 2001	1396
7	(Jamaica) Roshawn Clarke	1 Jul 2004	1384
8	(Estonia) Rasmus Mägi	4 May 1992	1381
9	(United States) CJ Allen	14 Feb 1995	1364
10	(Jamaica) Malik James-King	28 Jun 1999	1345

Women

#	Athlete	Born	Points
1	(Netherlands) Femke Bol	23 Feb 2000	1494
2	(United States) Sydney McLaughlin-Levrone	7 Aug 1999	1462
3	(United States) Anna Cockrell	28 Aug 1997	1457
4	(Jamaica) Rushell Clayton	18 Oct 1992	1416
5	(Jamaica) Shiann Salmon	31 Mar 1999	1411
6	(United States) Jasmine Jones	30 Nov 2001	1349
7	(United States) Shamier Little	20 Mar 1995	1368
8	(Jamaica) Andrenette Knight	19 Nov 1996	1338
9	(France) Louise Maraval	31 Jul 2001	1336
10	(Jamaica) Janieve Russell	14 Nov 1993	1331

=== 3000 metres steeplechase ===
Men

#	Athlete	Born	Points
1	(Morocco) Soufiane El Bakkali	7 Jan 1996	1452
2	(Kenya) Amos Serem	28 Aug 2002	1413
3	(Kenya) Abraham Kibiwot	6 Apr 1996	1406
4	(Ethiopia) Samuel Firewu	3 May 2004	1399
5	(Tunisia) Mohamed Amin Jhinaoui	2 Apr 1997	1388
6	(Ethiopia) Getnet Wale	16 Jul 2000	1351
7	(Tunisia) Ahmed Jaziri	16 Dec 1997	1337
8	(Spain) Daniel Arce	22 Apr 1992	1326
9	(Japan) Ryuji Miura	11 Feb 2002	1324
10	(United States) Kenneth Rooks	21 Oct 1999	1321

Women

#	Athlete	Born	Points
1	(Bahrain) Winfred Yavi	31 Dec 1999	1485
2	(Kenya) Faith Cherotich	13 Jul 2004	1480
3	(Uganda) Peruth Chemutai	10 Jul 2003	1445
4	(Kenya) Beatrice Chepkoech	6 Jul 1991	1422
5	(France) Alice Finot	9 Feb 1991	1404
6	(Ethiopia) Sembo Almayew	24 Jan 2005	1368
7	(United Kingdom) Elizabeth Bird	4 Oct 1994	1362
8	(Germany) Gesa Felicitas Krause	3 Aug 1992	1347
9	(Ethiopia) Lomi Muleta	29 Nov 2001	1330
10	(United States) Valerie Constien	21 Mar 1996	1330

=== High jump ===
Men

#	Athlete	Born	Points
1	(New Zealand) Hamish Kerr	17 Aug 1996	1442
2	(United States) Shelby McEwen	6 Apr 1996	1382
3	(Italy) Gianmarco Tamberi	1 Jun 1992	1365
4	(Qatar) Mutaz Essa Barshim	24 Jun 1991	1365
5	(Ukraine) Oleh Doroshchuk	4 Jul 2001	1342
6	(South Korea) Woo Sang-hyeok	23 Apr 1996	1341
7	(Italy) Stefano Sottile	26 Jan 1998	1303
8	(Jamaica) Romaine Beckford	9 Jul 2002	1287
9	(Japan) Ryoichi Akamatsu	2 May 1995	1275
10	(Australia) Yual Reath	18 May 2000	1275

Women

#	Athlete	Born	Points
1	(Ukraine) Yaroslava Mahuchikh	19 Sep 2001	1494
2	(Australia) Nicola Olyslagers	28 Dec 1996	1421
3	(Serbia) Angelina Topić	26 Jul 2005	1347
4	(Ukraine) Iryna Gerashchenko	10 Mar 1995	1341
5	(Australia) Eleanor Patterson	22 May 1996	1336
6	(United States) Vashti Cunningham	18 Jan 1998	1318
7	(Germany) Christina Honsel	7 Jul 1997	1312
8	(Uzbekistan) Safina Sadullayeva	4 Mar 1998	1273
9	(Slovenia) Lia Apostolovski	23 Jun 2000	1269
10	(Cyprus) Elena Kulichenko	28 Jul 2002	1260

=== Pole vault ===
Men

#	Athlete	Born	Points
1	(Sweden) Armand Duplantis	10 Nov 1999	1625
2	(United States) Sam Kendricks	7 Sep 1992	1453
3	(Greece) Emmanouil Karalis	20 Oct 1999	1426
4	(Philippines) Ernest John Obiena	17 Nov 1995	1409
5	(United States) KC Lightfoot	11 Nov 1999	1365
6	(Australia) Kurtis Marschall	25 Apr 1997	1361
7	(Turkey) Ersu Şaşma	30 Sep 1999	1340
8	(Belgium) Ben Broeders	21 Jun 1995	1337
9	(France) Thibaut Collet	17 Jun 1999	1333
10	(China) Huang Bokai	26 Sep 1996	1329

Women

#	Athlete	Born	Points
1	(Australia) Nina Kennedy	5 Apr 1997	1474
2	(Canada) Alysha Newman	29 Jun 1994	1399
3	(Switzerland) Angelica Moser	9 Oct 1997	1395
4	(United Kingdom) Molly Caudery	17 Mar 2000	1379
5	(United States) Katie Moon	13 Jun 1991	1369
6	(United States) Sandi Morris	8 Jul 1992	1346
7	(New Zealand) Eliza McCartney	11 Dec 1996	1346
8	(Czech Republic) Amálie Švábíková	22 Nov 1999	1317
9	(Greece) Katerina Stefanidi	4 Feb 1990	1296
10	(Finland) Wilma Murto	11 Jun 1998	1293

=== Long jump ===
Men

#	Athlete	Born	Points
1	(Greece) Miltiadis Tentoglou	18 Mar 1998	1439
2	(Switzerland) Simon Ehammer	7 Feb 2000	1361
3	(Jamaica) Wayne Pinnock	24 Oct 2000	1360
4	(Italy) Mattia Furlani	7 Feb 2005	1360
5	(Jamaica) Carey McLeod	14 Apr 1998	1331
6	(Germany) Simon Batz	1 Dec 2002	1294
7	(United Kingdom) Jacob Fincham-Dukes	12 Jan 1997	1293
8	(Jamaica) Tajay Gayle	2 Aug 1996	1290
9	(China) Zhang Mingkun	20 Oct 2000	1290
10	(United States) Marquis Dendy	17 Nov 1992	1258

Women

#	Athlete	Born	Points
1	(United States) Tara Davis-Woodhall	20 May 1999	1438
2	(Germany) Malaika Mihambo	3 Feb 1994	1394
3	(Italy) Larissa Iapichino	18 Jul 2002	1380
4	(United States) Jasmine Moore	1 May 2001	1346
5	(United States) Monae' Nichols	24 Nov 1998	1341
6	(Nigeria) Ese Brume	20 Jan 1996	1310
7	(United States) Quanesha Burks	15 Mar 1995	1306
8	(Burkina Faso) Marthe Koala	8 Mar 1994	1295
9	(Colombia) Natalia Linares	3 Jan 2003	1285
10	(Romania) Alina Rotaru-Kottmann	5 Jun 1993	1280

=== Triple jump ===
Men

#	Athlete	Born	Points
1	(Portugal) Pedro Pichardo	30 Jun 1993	1438
2	(Spain) Jordan Díaz	23 Feb 2001	1416
3	(Burkina Faso) Hugues Fabrice Zango	25 Jun 1993	1400
4	(Italy) Andy Díaz	25 Dec 1995	1377
5	(Germany) Max Heß	13 Jul 1996	1346
6	(Jamaica) Jaydon Hibbert	17 Jan 2005	1344
7	(Cuba) Lázaro Martínez	7 Feb 2000	1332
8	(Algeria) Yasser Triki	24 Mar 1997	1330
9	(Brazil) Almir dos Santos	4 Sep 1993	1316
10	(United States) Salif Mane	12 Dec 2001	1295

Women

#	Athlete	Born	Points
1	(Dominica) Thea LaFond	5 Apr 1994	1417
2	(Cuba) Leyanis Pérez	10 Jan 2002	1401
3	(Jamaica) Shanieka Ricketts	2 Feb 1992	1384
4	(Spain) Ana Peleteiro	2 Dec 1995	1327
5	(United States) Jasmine Moore	1 May 2001	1303
6	(Jamaica) Ackelia Smith	5 Feb 2002	1297
7	(Cuba) Liadagmis Povea	6 Feb 1996	1296
8	(United States) Keturah Orji	5 Mar 1996	1271
9	(Italy) Dariya Derkach	27 Mar 1993	1266
10	(Turkey) Tuğba Danışmaz	1 Sep 1999	1254

=== Shot put ===
Men

#	Athlete	Born	Points
1	(United States) Ryan Crouser	18 Dec 1992	1520
2	(United States) Joe Kovacs	28 Jun 1989	1470
3	(Italy) Leonardo Fabbri	15 Apr 1997	1465
4	(United States) Payton Otterdahl	2 Apr 1996	1419
5	(Jamaica) Rajindra Campbell	29 Feb 1996	1414
6	(Nigeria) Chukwuebuka Enekwechi	28 Jan 1993	1374
7	(New Zealand) Tom Walsh	1 Mar 1992	1364
8	(New Zealand) Jacko Gill	20 Dec 1994	1338
9	(United States) Roger Steen	17 May 1992	1331
10	(United States) Jordan Geist	21 Jul 1998	1322

Women

#	Athlete	Born	Points
1	(United States) Chase Jackson	20 Jul 1994	1416
2	(Germany) Yemisi Ogunleye	3 Oct 1998	1407
3	(Canada) Sarah Mitton	20 Jun 1996	1403
4	(New Zealand) Maddi Wesche	13 Jun 1999	1368
5	(China) Song Jiayuan	15 Feb 1997	1337
6	(China) Gong Lijiao	24 Jan 1989	1334
7	(Netherlands) Jessica Schilder	19 Mar 1999	1327
8	(United States) Jaida Ross	29 Oct 2001	1278
9	(Jamaica) Danniel Thomas-Dodd	11 Nov 1992	1274
10	(United States) Raven Saunders	15 May 1996	1248

=== Discus throw ===
Men

#	Athlete	Born	Points
1	(Lithuania) Mykolas Alekna	28 Sep 2002	1488
2	(Australia) Matthew Denny	2 Jun 1996	1431
3	(Slovenia) Kristjan Čeh	17 Feb 1999	1416
4	(Jamaica) Rojé Stona	26 Feb 1999	1377
5	(Austria) Lukas Weißhaidinger	20 Feb 1992	1352
6	(Sweden) Daniel Ståhl	27 Aug 1992	1351
7	(Germany) Clemens Prüfer	13 Aug 1997	1295
8	(Lithuania) Andrius Gudžius	14 Feb 1991	1288
9	(Jamaica) Traves Smikle	7 May 1992	1288
10	(Germany) Henrik Janssen	19 May 1998	1279

Women

#	Athlete	Born	Points
1	(United States) Valarie Allman	23 Feb 1995	1483
2	(China) Feng Bin	3 Apr 1994	1422
3	(Croatia) Sandra Elkasević	21 Jun 1990	1380
4	(Cuba) Yaime Pérez	29 May 1991	1380
5	(Netherlands) Jorinde van Klinken	2 Feb 2000	1333
6	(Germany) Marike Steinacker	3 Apr 1992	1289
7	(Sweden) Vanessa Kamga	19 Nov 1998	1258
8	(Italy) Daisy Osakue	16 Jan 1996	1258
9	(Germany) Kristin Pudenz	9 Feb 1993	1258
10	(Brazil) Izabela da Silva	2 Aug 1995	1254

=== Hammer throw ===
Men

#	Athlete	Born	Points
1	(Canada) Ethan Katzberg	5 Apr 2002	1461
2	(Ukraine) Mykhaylo Kokhan	22 Jan 2001	1417
3	(Poland) Paweł Fajdek	4 Jun 1989	1357
4	(Poland) Wojciech Nowicki	22 Feb 1989	1357
5	(Hungary) Bence Halász	4 Aug 1997	1349
6	(United States) Rudy Winkler	6 Dec 1994	1323
7	(United States) Daniel Haugh	3 May 1995	1309
8	(France) Yann Chaussinand	11 May 1998	1296
9	(Norway) Eivind Henriksen	14 Sep 1990	1263
10	(Netherlands) Denzel Comenentia	25 Nov 1995	1259

Women

#	Athlete	Born	Points
1	(Canada) Camryn Rogers	7 Jun 1999	1388
2	(United States) Brooke Andersen	23 Aug 1995	1350
3	(United States) Annette Echikunwoke	29 Jul 1996	1305
4	(United States) Janee' Kassanavoid	19 Jan 1995	1296
5	(United States) DeAnna Price	8 Jun 1993	1294
6	(China) Zhao Jie	13 Oct 2002	1290
7	(Finland) Silja Kosonen	16 Dec 2002	1285
8	(Poland) Anita Włodarczyk	8 Aug 1985	1282
9	(Azerbaijan) Hanna Skydan	14 May 1992	1274
10	(Venezuela) Rosa Rodríguez	2 Jul 1986	1248

=== Javelin throw ===
Men

#	Athlete	Born	Points
1	(Grenada) Anderson Peters	21 Oct 1997	1431
2	(India) Neeraj Chopra	24 Dec 1997	1423
3	(Czech Republic) Jakub Vadlejch	10 Oct 1990	1387
4	(Germany) Julian Weber	29 Aug 1994	1378
5	(Kenya) Julius Yego	4 Jan 1989	1306
6	(Trinidad and Tobago) Keshorn Walcott	2 Apr 1993	1291
7	(Finland) Oliver Helander	1 Jan 1997	1280
8	(Japan) Genki Dean	30 Dec 1991	1276
9	(Moldova) Andrian Mardare	20 Jun 1995	1264
10	(Finland) Lassi Etelätalo	30 Apr 1988	1263

Women

#	Athlete	Born	Points
1	(Japan) Haruka Kitaguchi	16 Mar 1998	1396
2	(Serbia) Adriana Vilagoš	2 Jan 2004	1349
3	(Australia) Mackenzie Little	22 Dec 1996	1309
4	(Colombia) Flor Ruiz	29 Jan 1991	1300
5	(South Africa) Jo-Ane van Dyk	3 Oct 1997	1292
6	(Czech Republic) Nikola Ogrodníková	18 Aug 1990	1265
7	(United States) Maggie Malone	30 Dec 1993	1263
8	(Austria) Victoria Hudson	28 May 1996	1260
9	(Poland) Maria Andrejczyk	9 Mar 1996	1251
10	(Croatia) Sara Kolak	22 Jun 1995	1230

=== Marathon ===
Men

#	Athlete	Born	Points
1	(Ethiopia) Tamirat Tola	11 Aug 1991	1457
2	(Kenya) Benson Kipruto	17 Mar 1991	1438
3	(Ethiopia) Sisay Lemma	12 Dec 1990	1422
4	(Kenya) Alexander Mutiso Munyao	10 Sep 1996	1419
5	(Belgium) Bashir Abdi	10 Feb 1989	1406
6	(Kenya) John Korir	2 Dec 1996	1398
7	(Kenya) Cyprian Kimurgor Kotut	6 Jun 1992	1392
8	(Kenya) Vincent Kipkemoi	3 Jan 1999	1388
9	(Ethiopia) Asefa Boki	26 Sep 1997	1373
10	(Ethiopia) Kenenisa Bekele	13 Jun 1982	1372

Women

#	Athlete	Born	Points
1	(Ethiopia) Tigst Assefa	3 Dec 1996	1480
2	(Kenya) Ruth Chepngetich	8 Aug 1994	1479
3	(Netherlands) Sifan Hassan	1 Jan 1993	1476
4	(Ethiopia) Sutume Kebede	11 Dec 1994	1417
5	(Ethiopia) Worknesh Edesa	11 Sep 1992	1394
6	(Kenya) Hellen Obiri	13 Dec 1989	1382
7	(Kenya) Joyciline Jepkosgei	8 Dec 1993	1373
8	(Ethiopia) Alemu Megertu	12 Oct 1997	1373
9	(Ethiopia) Amane Beriso Shankule	13 Oct 1991	1369
10	(Ethiopia) Tigist Ketema	15 Sep 1998	1360

=== 20 km racewalking ===
Men

#	Athlete	Born	Points
1	(Spain) Álvaro Martín	18 Jun 1994	1372
2	(Brazil) Caio Bonfim	19 Mar 1991	1369
3	(Ecuador) Brian Pintado	29 Jul 1995	1362
4	(Sweden) Perseus Karlström	2 May 1990	1335
5	(Italy) Massimo Stano	27 Feb 1992	1326
6	(Canada) Evan Dunfee	28 Sep 1990	1326
7	(Japan) Koki Ikeda	3 May 1998	1322
8	(Spain) Paul McGrath	7 Mar 2002	1305
9	(Japan) Yuta Koga	15 Jul 1999	1303
10	(Japan) Toshikazu Yamanishi	15 Feb 1996	1296

Women

#	Athlete	Born	Points
1	(China) Yang Jiayu	18 Feb 1996	1332
2	(Spain) María Pérez	29 Apr 1996	1332
3	(Australia) Jemima Montag	15 Feb 1998	1323
4	(Peru) Kimberly García	19 Oct 1993	1313
5	(Mexico) Alegna González	2 Jan 1999	1306
6	(Ecuador) Glenda Morejón	30 May 2000	1277
7	(Peru) Evelyn Inga	16 Apr 1998	1271
8	(Colombia) Sandra Arenas	17 Sep 1993	1268
9	(China) Ma Zhenxia	1 Aug 1998	1268
10	(Spain) Laura García-Caro	16 Apr 1995	1264

=== 35 km racewalking ===
Men

#	Athlete	Born	Points
1	(Spain) Álvaro Martín	18 Jun 1994	1324
2	(Japan) Masatora Kawano	23 Oct 1998	1323
3	(Germany) Christopher Linke	24 Oct 1988	1266
4	(Canada) Evan Dunfee	28 Sep 1990	1246
5	(Spain) Miguel Ángel López	3 Jul 1988	1217
6	(Japan) Satoshi Maruo	28 Nov 1991	1215
7	(France) Aurélien Quinion	27 Jan 1993	1214
8	(Australia) Rhydian Cowley	4 Jan 1991	1205
9	(Italy) Andrea Agrusti	30 Aug 1995	1189
10	(Brazil) Caio Bonfim	19 Mar 1991	1170

Women

#	Athlete	Born	Points
1	(Spain) María Pérez	29 Apr 1996	1380
2	(Spain) Cristina Montesinos	12 Jul 1994	1238
3	(Brazil) Viviane Lyra	29 Jul 1993	1230
4	(Spain) Raquel González	16 Nov 1989	1186
5	(Italy) Nicole Colombi	29 Dec 1995	1176
6	(Australia) Rebecca Henderson	4 Jul 2001	1170
7	(Colombia) Sandra Arenas	17 Sep 1993	1151
8	(Italy) Federica Curiazzi	14 Aug 1992	1151
9	(Japan) Masumi Fuchise	2 Sep 1986	1142
10	(Hungary) Viktória Madarász	12 May 1985	1126

=== Decathlon & Heptathlon ===
Men

#	Athlete	Born	Points
1	(Germany) Leo Neugebauer	19 Jun 2000	1414
2	(Norway) Markus Rooth	22 Dec 2001	1398
3	(Grenada) Lindon Victor	28 Feb 1993	1390
4	(Estonia) Johannes Erm	26 Mar 1998	1370
5	(Netherlands) Sven Roosen	27 Jul 2001	1361
6	(Canada) Pierce LePage	22 Jan 1996	1361
7	(Canada) Damian Warner	4 Nov 1989	1341
8	(Estonia) Janek Õiglane	25 Apr 1994	1329
9	(Norway) Sander Skotheim	31 May 2002	1327
10	(United States) Harrison Williams	7 Mar 1996	1324

Women

#	Athlete	Born	Points
1	(Belgium) Nafissatou Thiam	19 Aug 1994	1440
2	(United Kingdom) Katarina Johnson-Thompson	9 Jan 1993	1411
3	(United States) Anna Hall	23 Mar 2001	1380
4	(Belgium) Noor Vidts	30 May 1996	1378
5	(Switzerland) Annik Kälin	27 Apr 2000	1335
6	(Netherlands) Emma Oosterwegel	29 Jun 1998	1294
7	(Colombia) Martha Araújo	12 May 1996	1287
8	(Netherlands) Sofie Dokter	19 Dec 2002	1281
9	(Netherlands) Anouk Vetter	4 Feb 1993	1280
10	(Hungary) Xénia Krizsán	13 Jan 1993	1270
