= 2025 World Athletics Rankings =

Individual rankings in athletics

- Organizer: World Athletics
- Edition: 4th

The 2025 World Athletics Rankings document the best-performing athletes in the sport of athletics, according to World Athletics' individual athlete ranking system. Individual athletes are assigned a points score best on an average of their best recent competition performances. The performance scoring is primarily based on the time or mark of the athlete, with additional points for their placement within the competition, along with some minor modifications based on the conditions. The world rankings are updated each Wednesday.

As of 30 December 2025, the number one ranked male athlete is Armand Duplantis with 1638 points, and the number one ranked female athlete is Beatrice Chebet with 1544 points.

== Overall rankings (top 10) ==
Men (as of 30 December 2025)
#	Athlete	Nation	Event(s)	Points
1	Armand Duplantis	Sweden (SWE)	Pole vault	1638
2	Rai Benjamin	United States (USA)	400 metres hurdles	1519
3	Noah Lyles	United States (USA)	100 metres, 200 metres	1515
4	Karsten Warholm	Norway (NOR)	400 metres hurdles	1515
5	Emmanuel Wanyonyi	Kenya (KEN)	800 metres	1512
6	Cordell Tinch	United States (USA)	110 metres hurdles	1504
7	Emmanouil Karalis	Greece (GRE)	Pole vault	1487
8	Alison dos Santos	Brazil (BRA)	400 metres hurdles	1480
9	Mykolas Alekna	Lithuania (LTU)	Discus throw	1476
10	Abderrahman Samba	Qatar (QAT)	400 metres hurdles	1463

Women (as of 30 December 2025)
#	Athlete	Nation	Event(s)	Points
1	Beatrice Chebet	Kenya (KEN)	5000 metres, 10,000 metres	1544
2	Melissa Jefferson	United States (USA)	100 metres, 200 metres	1540
3	Faith Kipyegon	Kenya (KEN)	1500 metres, 5000 metres	1524
4	Femke Bol	Netherlands (NED)	400 metres hurdles	1513
5	Faith Cherotich	Kenya (KEN)	3000 metres steeplechase	1494
6	Valarie Allman	United States (USA)	Discus throw	1489
7	Julien Alfred	Saint Lucia (LCA)	100 metres, 200 metres	1481
8	Marileidy Paulino	Dominican Republic (DOM)	400 metres	1480
9	Chase Jackson	United States (USA)	Shot put	1468
10	Gudaf Tsegay	Ethiopia (ETH)	1500 metres, 5000 metres, 10,000 metres	1468

== Event rankings (top 10) ==
World Athletics Rankings, as of 30 December 2025.

=== 100 metres ===
Men

#	Athlete	Born	Points
1	(Jamaica) Oblique Seville	16 March 2001	1462
2	(Jamaica) Kishane Thompson	17 July 2001	1460
3	(South Africa) Akani Simbine	21 September 1993	1416
4	(United States) Noah Lyles	18 July 1997	1415
5	(United States) Kenneth Bednarek	14 October 1998	1409
6	(United States) Trayvon Bromell	10 July 1995	1362
7	(United Kingdom) Jeremiah Azu	15 May 2001	1347
8	(United States) Christian Coleman	6 March 1996	1343
9	(Jamaica) Ackeem Blake	21 January 2002	1342
10	(United Kingdom) Zharnel Hughes	13 July 1995	1341

Women

#	Athlete	Born	Points
1	(United States) Melissa Jefferson	21 February 2001	1490
2	(Saint Lucia) Julien Alfred	10 June 2001	1473
3	(Jamaica) Tina Clayton	17 August 2004	1402
4	(Ivory Coast) Marie Josée Ta Lou	18 November 1988	1387
5	(United Kingdom) Dina Asher-Smith	4 December 1995	1371
6	(Jamaica) Shericka Jackson	16 July 1994	1370
7	(Jamaica) Tia Clayton	17 August 2004	1360
8	(United States) Jacious Sears	14 August 2001	1358
9	(United States) Sha'Carri Richardson	25 March 2000	1340
10	(Jamaica) Shelly-Ann Fraser-Pryce	27 December 1986	1337

=== 200 metres ===
Men

#	Athlete	Born	Points
1	(United States) Noah Lyles	18 July 1997	1487
2	(Botswana) Letsile Tebogo	7 June 2003	1455
3	(United States) Kenneth Bednarek	14 October 1998	1413
4	(Jamaica) Bryan Levell	23 December 2003	1405
5	(Dominican Republic) Alexander Ogando	3 May 2000	1394
6	(United Kingdom) Zharnel Hughes	13 July 1995	1349
7	(United States) Courtney Lindsey	18 November 1998	1349
8	(Zimbabwe) Tapiwanashe Makarawu	14 August 2000	1347
9	(United States) Robert Gregory	12 December 2001	1346
10	(Liberia) Joseph Fahnbulleh	11 September 2001	1339

Women

#	Athlete	Born	Points
1	(United States) Brittany Brown	18 April 1995	1414
2	(United States) Anavia Battle	28 March 1999	1413
3	(United States) Melissa Jefferson	21 February 2001	1410
4	(United Kingdom) Amy Hunt	15 May 2002	1397
5	(United Kingdom) Dina Asher-Smith	4 December 1995	1387
6	(Jamaica) Shericka Jackson	16 July 1994	1385
7	(Ivory Coast) Marie Josée Ta Lou	18 November 1988	1361
8	(United States) McKenzie Long	11 July 2000	1332
9	(Nigeria) Favour Ofili	31 December 2002	1330
10	(United Kingdom) Daryll Neita	29 August 1996	1305

=== 400 metres ===
Men

#	Athlete	Born	Points
1	(Botswana) Bayapo Ndori	20 June 1999	1434
2	(United States) Jacory Patterson	2 February 2000	1433
3	(Botswana) Collen Kebinatshipi	13 February 2004	1432
4	(United States) Christopher Bailey	29 May 2000	1410
5	(South Africa) Zakithi Nene	2 April 1998	1408
6	(Trinidad and Tobago) Jereem Richards	13 January 1994	1387
7	(United Kingdom) Charlie Dobson	20 October 1999	1364
8	(United Kingdom) Matthew Hudson-Smith	26 October 1994	1363
9	(United States) Vernon Norwood	10 April 1992	1358
10	(Zambia) Muzala Samukonga	9 December 2002	1353

Women

#	Athlete	Born	Points
1	(Dominican Republic) Marileidy Paulino	25 October 1996	1480
2	(Bahrain) Salwa Eid Naser	23 May 1998	1463
3	(United States) Sydney McLaughlin-Levrone	17 January 1998	1418
4	(Norway) Henriette Jæger	30 June 2003	1401
5	(United Kingdom) Amber Anning	18 November 2000	1397
6	(Poland) Natalia Bukowiecka	17 January 1998	1395
7	(United States) Isabella Whittaker	15 February 2002	1369
8	(Jamaica) Nickisha Pryce	7 March 2001	1369
9	(Netherlands) Lieke Klaver	20 August 1998	1351
10	(Chile) Martina Weil	12 July 1999	1347

=== 800 metres ===
Men

#	Athlete	Born	Points
1	(Kenya) Emmanuel Wanyonyi	1 August 2004	1512
2	(Algeria) Djamel Sedjati	3 May 1999	1446
3	(Canada) Marco Arop	20 September 1998	1433
4	(United States) Josh Hoey	1 November 1999	1425
5	(United Kingdom) Max Burgin	20 May 2002	1423
6	(Spain) Mohamed Attaoui	26 September 2001	1421
7	(Botswana) Tshepiso Masalela	25 May 1999	1410
8	(United States) Bryce Hoppel	5 September 1997	1378
9	(France) Gabriel Tual	9 April 1998	1348
10	(Algeria) Slimane Moula	25 February 1999	1348

Women

#	Athlete	Born	Points
1	(United Kingdom) Georgia Bell	17 October 1993	1442
2	(United Kingdom) Keely Hodgkinson	3 March 2002	1423
3	(Switzerland) Audrey Werro	27 March 2004	1405
4	(Kenya) Lilian Odira	18 April 1999	1394
5	(Ethiopia) Tsige Duguma	23 February 2001	1384
6	(South Africa) Prudence Sekgodiso	5 January 2002	1375
7	(Kenya) Sarah Moraa	26 October 2005	1353
8	(United States) Addison Wiley	24 October 2003	1350
9	(United States) Sage Hurta-Klecker	23 June 1998	1346
10	(Uganda) Halimah Nakaayi	16 October 1994	1345

=== 1500 metres ===
Men

#	Athlete	Born	Points
1	(Portugal) Isaac Nader	17 August 1999	1423
2	(Netherlands) Niels Laros	17 April 2005	1417
3	(Kenya) Phanuel Koech	1 December 2006	1416
4	(France) Azeddine Habz	19 July 1993	1413
5	(United States) Yared Nuguse	1 June 1999	1412
6	(Kenya) Reynold Cheruiyot	30 July 2004	1409
7	(Kenya) Timothy Cheruiyot	20 November 1995	1400
8	(Morocco) Anass Essayi	18 May 2001	1355
9	(Australia) Cameron Myers	9 June 2006	1353
10	(Germany) Robert Farken	20 September 1997	1351

Women

#	Athlete	Born	Points
1	(Kenya) Nelly Chepchirchir	4 June 2003	1431
2	(Australia) Jessica Hull	22 October 1996	1429
3	(Kenya) Faith Kipyegon	10 January 1994	1415
4	(United States) Nikki Hiltz	23 October 1994	1394
5	(Ethiopia) Diribe Welteji	13 May 2002	1379
6	(Republic of Ireland) Sarah Healy	13 February 2001	1370
7	(Australia) Linden Hall	20 June 1991	1369
8	(United Kingdom) Georgia Bell	17 October 1993	1366
9	(Ethiopia) Birke Haylom	6 January 2006	1348
10	(United States) Sinclaire Johnson	13 April 1998	1343

=== 5000 metres ===
Men

#	Athlete	Born	Points
1	(France) Jimmy Gressier	4 May 1997	1417
2	(Ethiopia) Yomif Kejelcha	1 August 1997	1398
3	(United States) Cole Hocker	6 June 2001	1395
4	(Ethiopia) Biniam Mehary	20 December 2006	1395
5	(United States) Grant Fisher	22 April 1997	1394
6	(Ethiopia) Kuma Girma	24 November 2005	1394
7	(Bahrain) Birhanu Balew	27 February 1996	1389
8	(United States) Nico Young	27 July 2002	1384
9	(Australia) Ky Robinson	27 February 2002	1373
10	(Belgium) Isaac Kimeli	9 March 1994	1367

Women

#	Athlete	Born	Points
1	(Kenya) Beatrice Chebet	5 March 2000	1496
2	(Italy) Nadia Battocletti	12 April 2000	1389
3	(Ethiopia) Gudaf Tsegay	23 January 1997	1388
4	(Kenya) Agnes Jebet Ngetich	23 January 2001	1385
5	(Kenya) Faith Kipyegon	10 January 1994	1360
6	(Ethiopia) Fantaye Belayneh	11 September 2000	1352
7	(Ethiopia) Birke Haylom	6 January 2006	1348
8	(Ethiopia) Likina Amebaw	30 November 1997	1346
9	(United States) Josette Andrews	15 December 1995	1346
10	(United States) Shelby Houlihan	8 February 1993	1340

=== 10,000 metres ===
Men

#	Athlete	Born	Points
1	(Ethiopia) Berihu Aregawi	28 February 2001	1332
2	(Ethiopia) Selemon Barega	20 January 2000	1304
3	(Ethiopia) Yomif Kejelcha	1 August 1997	1299
4	(Kenya) Ishmael Kipkurui	10 February 2005	1296
5	(France) Jimmy Gressier	4 May 1997	1278
6	(South Africa) Adriaan Wildschutt	3 May 1998	1275
7	(Uganda) Jacob Kiplimo	14 November 2000	1269
8	(Uganda) Joshua Cheptegei	12 September 1996	1263
9	(United States) Grant Fisher	22 April 1997	1258
10	(Sweden) Andreas Almgren	12 June 1995	1254

Women

#	Athlete	Born	Points
1	(Kenya) Beatrice Chebet	5 March 2000	1405
2	(Italy) Nadia Battocletti	12 April 2000	1386
3	(Kenya) Agnes Jebet Ngetich	23 January 2001	1355
4	(Ethiopia) Gudaf Tsegay	23 January 1997	1346
5	(Japan) Ririka Hironaka	24 November 2000	1320
6	(Ethiopia) Fotyen Tesfay	17 February 1998	1291
7	(Uganda) Joy Cheptoyek	15 May 2002	1280
8	(Ethiopia) Asayech Ayichew	3 April 2005	1258
9	(Ethiopia) Yenawa Nbret	18 May 2007	1257
10	(United Kingdom) Megan Keith	23 April 2002	1255

=== 110 & 100 metres hurdles ===
Men

#	Athlete	Born	Points
1	(United States) Cordell Tinch	13 July 2000	1504
2	(Japan) Rachid Muratake	6 February 2002	1406
3	(Spain) Enrique Llopis	15 October 2000	1401
4	(United States) Trey Cunningham	26 August 1998	1391
5	(Jamaica) Orlando Bennett	12 October 1999	1382
6	(Switzerland) Jason Joseph	11 October 1998	1380
7	(United States) Jamal Britt	28 December 1998	1379
8	(United States) Dylan Beard	15 September 1998	1378
9	(United States) Grant Holloway	19 November 1997	1376
10	(United States) Ja'Kobe Tharp	30 September 2005	1371

Women

#	Athlete	Born	Points
1	(United States) Grace Stark	6 May 2001	1457
2	(Switzerland) Ditaji Kambundji	20 May 2002	1449
3	(Nigeria) Tobi Amusan	23 April 1997	1430
4	(United States) Masai Russell	17 June 2000	1416
5	(Jamaica) Ackera Nugent	29 April 2002	1409
6	(Jamaica) Danielle Williams	14 September 1992	1402
7	(Netherlands) Nadine Visser	9 February 1995	1392
8	(The Bahamas) Devynne Charlton	26 November 1995	1386
9	(Poland) Pia Skrzyszowska	20 April 2001	1371
10	(United States) Tonea Marshall	17 October 1998	1354

=== 400 metres hurdles ===
Men

#	Athlete	Born	Points
1	(United States) Rai Benjamin	27 July 1997	1519
2	(Norway) Karsten Warholm	28 February 1996	1515
3	(Brazil) Alison dos Santos	3 June 2000	1480
4	(Qatar) Abderrahman Samba	5 September 1995	1463
5	(Nigeria) Ezekiel Nathaniel	20 June 2003	1450
6	(Brazil) Matheus Lima	1 June 2003	1374
7	(United States) Trevor Bassitt	26 February 1998	1366
8	(Germany) Emil Agyekum	22 May 1999	1363
9	(United States) Caleb Dean	20 June 2001	1348
10	(United States) CJ Allen	14 February 1995	1327

Women

#	Athlete	Born	Points
1	(Netherlands) Femke Bol	23 February 2000	1513
2	(Slovakia) Emma Zapletalová	24 March 2000	1418
3	(United States) Jasmine Jones	30 November 2001	1408
4	(United States) Anna Cockrell	28 August 1997	1403
5	(United States) Dalilah Muhammad	7 February 1990	1403
6	(Panama) Gianna Woodruff	18 November 1993	1392
7	(Jamaica) Andrenette Knight	19 November 1996	1376
8	(Belgium) Naomi Van den Broeck	3 January 1996	1358
9	(Italy) Ayomide Folorunso	17 October 1996	1318
10	(Norway) Amalie Iuel	17 April 1994	1317

=== 3000 metres steeplechase ===
Men

#	Athlete	Born	Points
1	(Morocco) Soufiane El Bakkali	7 January 1996	1415
2	(Kenya) Edmund Serem	27 December 2007	1384
3	(Germany) Frederik Ruppert	19 February 1997	1382
4	(Ethiopia) Samuel Firewu	3 May 2004	1355
5	(Morocco) Salaheddine Ben Yazide	6 May 2003	1333
6	(Ethiopia) Getnet Wale	16 July 2000	1329
7	(Japan) Ryuji Miura	11 February 2002	1328
8	(Spain) Daniel Arce	22 April 1992	1318
9	(Kenya) Simon Koech	10 June 2003	1314
10	(Tunisia) Mohamed Amin Jhinaoui	2 April 1997	1312

Women

#	Athlete	Born	Points
1	(Kenya) Faith Cherotich	13 July 2004	1491
2	(Bahrain) Winfred Yavi	31 December 1999	1460
3	(Ethiopia) Sembo Almayew	24 January 2005	1409
4	(Tunisia) Marwa Bouzayani	26 March 1997	1400
5	(Kazakhstan) Norah Jeruto	2 October 1995	1394
6	(Uganda) Peruth Chemutai	10 July 1999	1383
7	(Kenya) Doris Lemngole	5 February 2002	1380
8	(United States) Gabrielle Jennings	15 September 1998	1335
9	(Germany) Gesa Felicitas Krause	3 August 1992	1332
10	(United States) Courtney Wayment	4 August 1998	1331

=== High jump ===
Men

#	Athlete	Born	Points
1	(New Zealand) Hamish Kerr	17 August 1996	1423
2	(South Korea) Woo Sang-hyeok	23 April 1996	1417
3	(Ukraine) Oleh Doroshchuk	4 July 2001	1377
4	(Czech Republic) Jan Štefela	20 April 2001	1346
5	(United States) JuVaughn Harrison	30 April 1999	1329
6	(United States) Tyus Wilson	5 November 2002	1279
7	(Jamaica) Romaine Beckford	9 July 2002	1267
8	(Italy) Matteo Sioli	1 October 2005	1265
9	(Japan) Ryoichi Akamatsu	2 May 1995	1261
10	(Japan) Tomohiro Shinno	17 August 1996	1258

Women

#	Athlete	Born	Points
1	(Australia) Nicola Olyslagers	28 December 1996	1466
2	(Ukraine) Yaroslava Mahuchikh	19 September 2001	1429
3	(Australia) Eleanor Patterson	22 May 1996	1358
4	(Serbia) Angelina Topić	26 July 2005	1345
5	(Poland) Maria Żodzik	19 January 1997	1342
6	(United Kingdom) Morgan Lake	12 May 1997	1342
7	(Ukraine) Yuliia Levchenko	28 November 1997	1332
8	(Germany) Christina Honsel	7 July 1997	1332
9	(United States) Vashti Cunningham	18 January 1998	1267
10	(Germany) Imke Onnen	17 August 1994	1258

=== Pole vault ===
Men

#	Athlete	Born	Points
1	(Sweden) Armand Duplantis	10 November 1999	1638
2	(Greece) Emmanouil Karalis	20 October 1999	1487
3	(Australia) Kurtis Marschall	25 April 1997	1417
4	(United States) Sam Kendricks	7 September 1992	1402
5	(Netherlands) Menno Vloon	11 May 1994	1391
6	(France) Renaud Lavillenie	18 September 1986	1367
7	(France) Thibaut Collet	17 June 1999	1366
8	(Turkey) Ersu Şaşma	30 September 1999	1352
9	(United States) Christopher Nilsen	13 January 1998	1350
10	(Norway) Sondre Guttormsen	1 June 1999	1344

Women

#	Athlete	Born	Points
1	(United States) Katie Moon	13 June 1991	1452
2	(United States) Sandi Morris	8 July 1992	1426
3	(Slovenia) Tina Šutej	7 November 1988	1364
4	(Switzerland) Angelica Moser	9 October 1997	1359
5	(United Kingdom) Molly Caudery	17 March 2000	1358
6	(France) Marie-Julie Bonnin	17 December 2001	1325
7	(Czech Republic) Amálie Švábíková	22 November 1999	1323
8	(United States) Emily Grove	22 May 1993	1316
9	(New Zealand) Olivia McTaggart	9 January 2000	1307
10	(United States) Hana Moll	31 January 2005	1305

=== Long jump ===
Men

#	Athlete	Born	Points
1	(Italy) Mattia Furlani	7 February 2005	1428
2	(Switzerland) Simon Ehammer	7 February 2000	1361
3	(Australia) Liam Adcock	21 June 1996	1359
4	(Greece) Miltiadis Tentoglou	18 March 1998	1349
5	(Jamaica) Wayne Pinnock	24 October 2000	1323
6	(Jamaica) Tajay Gayle	2 August 1996	1313
7	(Bulgaria) Bozhidar Sarâboyukov	6 August 2004	1313
8	(China) Zhang Mingkun	20 October 2000	1309
9	(Sweden) Thobias Montler	15 February 1996	1306
10	(China) Shu Heng	22 May 2004	1299

Women

#	Athlete	Born	Points
1	(United States) Tara Davis-Woodhall	20 May 1999	1443
2	(Germany) Malaika Mihambo	3 February 1994	1439
3	(Italy) Larissa Iapichino	18 July 2002	1374
4	(France) Hilary Kpatcha	5 May 1998	1363
5	(United States) Claire Bryant	25 August 2001	1355
6	(Colombia) Natalia Linares	3 January 2003	1319
7	(United States) Jasmine Moore	1 May 2001	1305
8	(Switzerland) Annik Kälin	27 April 2000	1301
9	(Portugal) Agate de Sousa	5 June 2000	1295
10	(United States) Quanesha Burks	15 March 1995	1274

=== Triple jump ===
Men

#	Athlete	Born	Points
1	(Portugal) Pedro Pichardo	30 June 1993	1439
2	(Italy) Andy Díaz	25 December 1995	1409
3	(Jamaica) Jordan Scott	29 June 1997	1400
4	(Algeria) Yasser Triki	24 March 1997	1360
5	(Burkina Faso) Hugues Fabrice Zango	25 June 1993	1345
6	(Cuba) Lázaro Martínez	3 November 1997	1330
7	(Italy) Andrea Dallavalle	31 October 1999	1322
8	(China) Zhu Yaming	4 May 1994	1317
9	(Germany) Max Heß	13 July 1996	1301
10	(France) Jonathan Seremes	3 September 2000	1284

Women

#	Athlete	Born	Points
1	(Cuba) Leyanis Pérez	10 January 2002	1449
2	(Jamaica) Shanieka Ricketts	2 February 1992	1368
3	(Dominica) Thea LaFond	5 April 1994	1358
4	(Cuba) Liadagmis Povea	6 February 1996	1355
5	(United States) Jasmine Moore	1 May 2001	1315
6	(Cuba) Davisleydi Velazco	4 September 1999	1303
7	(Senegal) Saly Sarr	14 October 2002	1287
8	(Spain) Ana Peleteiro	2 December 1995	1269
9	(Jamaica) Ackelia Smith	5 February 2002	1264
10	(Slovenia) Neja Filipič	22 April 1995	1250

=== Shot put ===
Men

#	Athlete	Born	Points
1	(United States) Joe Kovacs	28 June 1989	1440
2	(Italy) Leonardo Fabbri	15 April 1997	1435
3	(New Zealand) Tom Walsh	1 March 1992	1418
4	(United States) Payton Otterdahl	2 April 1996	1414
5	(United States) Adrian Piperi	20 January 1999	1389
6	(Jamaica) Rajindra Campbell	29 February 1996	1380
7	(Nigeria) Chukwuebuka Enekwechi	28 January 1993	1373
8	(United States) Roger Steen	17 May 1992	1354
9	(United States) Josh Awotunde	12 June 1995	1347
10	(Italy) Zane Weir	7 September 1995	1346

Women

#	Athlete	Born	Points
1	(United States) Chase Jackson	20 July 1994	1468
2	(Netherlands) Jessica Schilder	19 March 1999	1465
3	(Canada) Sarah Mitton	20 June 1996	1417
4	(New Zealand) Maddi Wesche	13 June 1999	1334
5	(Sweden) Fanny Roos	2 January 1995	1334
6	(Germany) Yemisi Ogunleye	3 October 1998	1320
7	(United States) Jaida Ross	29 October 2001	1309
8	(United States) Maggie Ewen	23 September 1994	1291
9	(China) Gong Lijiao	24 January 1989	1284
10	(China) Zhang Linru	23 September 1999	1256

=== Discus throw ===
Men

#	Athlete	Born	Points
1	(Lithuania) Mykolas Alekna	28 September 2002	1476
2	(Sweden) Daniel Ståhl	27 August 1992	1419
3	(Slovenia) Kristjan Čeh	17 February 1999	1411
4	(Australia) Matthew Denny	2 June 1996	1395
5	(Jamaica) Ralford Mullings	22 November 2002	1336
6	(Jamaica) Roje Stona	26 February 1999	1303
7	(Germany) Henrik Janssen	19 May 1998	1303
8	(United Kingdom) Lawrence Okoye	6 October 1991	1290
9	(United States) Sam Mattis	19 March 1994	1275
10	(Cuba) Mario Díaz	8 December 1999	1272

Women

#	Athlete	Born	Points
1	(United States) Valarie Allman	23 February 1995	1489
2	(Netherlands) Jorinde van Klinken	2 February 2000	1393
3	(Croatia) Sandra Elkasević	21 June 1990	1357
4	(Cuba) Yaime Pérez	29 May 1991	1343
5	(United States) Laulauga Tausaga	22 May 1998	1319
6	(China) Feng Bin	3 April 1994	1296
7	(Cuba) Silinda Morales	30 August 2000	1270
8	(Sweden) Vanessa Kamga	19 November 1998	1267
9	(Germany) Shanice Craft	15 May 1993	1263
10	(United States) Cierra Jackson	28 August 2002	1255

=== Hammer throw ===
Men

#	Athlete	Born	Points
1	(Canada) Ethan Katzberg	5 April 2002	1442
2	(Hungary) Bence Halász	4 August 1997	1425
3	(Ukraine) Mykhaylo Kokhan	22 January 2001	1396
4	(Germany) Merlin Hummel	4 January 2002	1383
5	(United States) Rudy Winkler	6 December 1994	1357
6	(France) Yann Chaussinand	11 May 1998	1328
7	(Poland) Paweł Fajdek	4 June 1989	1301
8	(Norway) Thomas Mardal	16 April 1997	1288
9	(United States) Daniel Haugh	3 May 1995	1249
10	(Hungary) Dániel Rába	24 April 1998	1248

Women

#	Athlete	Born	Points
1	(Canada) Camryn Rogers	7 June 1999	1436
2	(United States) DeAnna Price	8 June 1993	1326
3	(Finland) Silja Kosonen	16 December 2002	1323
4	(China) Zhao Jie	13 October 2002	1305
5	(United States) Brooke Andersen	23 August 1995	1297
6	(Poland) Anita Włodarczyk	8 August 1985	1296
7	(China) Zhang Jiale	22 October 2006	1294
8	(United States) Janee' Kassanavoid	19 January 1995	1289
9	(United States) Rachel Richeson	27 September 1999	1277
10	(Denmark) Katrine Koch Jacobsen	24 June 1999	1271

=== Javelin throw ===
Men

#	Athlete	Born	Points
1	(Germany) Julian Weber	29 August 1994	1444
2	(Trinidad and Tobago) Keshorn Walcott	2 April 1993	1384
3	(India) Neeraj Chopra	24 December 1997	1381
4	(Grenada) Anderson Peters	21 October 1997	1365
5	(United States) Curtis Thompson	8 February 1996	1324
6	(Kenya) Julius Yego	4 January 1989	1323
7	(India) Sachin Yadav	25 October 1999	1298
8	(Brazil) Luiz Maurício da Silva	17 January 2000	1297
9	(Sri Lanka) Rumesh Tharanga	21 March 2003	1283
10	(Poland) Cyprian Mrzygłód	2 February 1998	1263

Women

#	Athlete	Born	Points
1	(Greece) Elina Tzengko	2 September 2002	1363
2	(Serbia) Adriana Vilagoš	2 January 2004	1322
3	(South Africa) Jo-Ané du Plessis	3 October 1997	1301
4	(Australia) Mackenzie Little	22 December 1996	1296
5	(Japan) Haruka Kitaguchi	16 March 1998	1279
6	(Latvia) Anete Sietiņa	5 February 1996	1270
7	(Ecuador) Juleisy Angulo	2 January 2001	1268
8	(Colombia) Flor Ruiz	29 January 1991	1249
9	(Austria) Victoria Hudson	28 May 1996	1248
10	(New Zealand) Tori Peeters	17 May 1994	1242

=== Half marathon & 10K ===
Men

#	Athlete	Born	Points
1	(Uganda) Jacob Kiplimo	14 November 2000	1334
2	(Ethiopia) Yomif Kejelcha	1 August 1997	1329
3	(Kenya) Isaia Kipkoech Lasoi	12 October 1999	1279
4	(Kenya) Alex Matata	27 July 1997	1269
5	(Kenya) Nicholas Kimeli	29 September 1998	1262
6	(Kenya) Vincent Kibet Langat	6 February 2001	1261
7	(Burundi) Rodrigue Kwizera	10 October 1999	1259
8	(Ethiopia) Gemechu Dida	12 September 1999	1259
9	(Sweden) Andreas Almgren	12 June 1995	1237
10	(Kenya) Patrick Mosin	6 June 2000	1234

Women

#	Athlete	Born	Points
1	(Kenya) Agnes Jebet Ngetich	23 January 2001	1330
2	(Ethiopia) Fotyen Tesfay	17 February 1998	1289
3	(Ethiopia) Likina Amebaw	30 November 1997	1273
4	(Ethiopia) Medina Eisa	3 January 2005	1261
5	(Kenya) Lilian Kasait Rengeruk	3 May 1997	1260
6	(Kenya) Judy Jelagat Kemboi	26 June 1999	1253
7	(Kenya) Loice Chemnung	22 February 1997	1252
8	(Kenya) Joyciline Jepkosgei	28 December 1993	1250
9	(Kenya) Grace Nawowuna	10 November 2003	1240
10	(Kenya) Catherine Amanang'ole	5 October 2002	1239

=== Marathon ===
Men

#	Athlete	Born	Points
1	(Kenya) Sabastian Sawe	16 March 1995	1446
2	(Kenya) John Korir	2 December 1996	1438
3	(Uganda) Jacob Kiplimo	14 November 2000	1420
4	(Ethiopia) Milkesa Mengesha	16 April 2000	1395
5	(Ethiopia) Deresa Geleta	14 January 1996	1385
6	(Tanzania) Alphonce Simbu	14 February 1992	1373
7	(Ethiopia) Tsegaye Getachew	30 November 1996	1373
8	(Germany) Amanal Petros	17 May 1995	1367
9	(Kenya) Amos Kipruto	16 September 1992	1357
10	(Ethiopia) Tadese Takele	3 August 2002	1353

Women

#	Athlete	Born	Points
1	(Ethiopia) Tigst Assefa	3 December 1996	1430
2	(Kenya) Peres Jepchirchir	27 September 1993	1420
3	(Kenya) Joyciline Jepkosgei	28 December 1993	1398
4	(Ethiopia) Hawi Feysa	1 February 1999	1394
5	(Ethiopia) Sutume Kebede	11 December 1994	1391
6	(Ethiopia) Alemu Megertu	12 October 1997	1391
7	(Kenya) Brigid Kosgei	20 February 1994	1378
8	(Ethiopia) Yalemzerf Yehualaw	3 August 1999	1370
9	(Kenya) Sharon Lokedi	10 March 1994	1365
10	(Kenya) Hellen Obiri	13 December 1989	1365

=== 20 km racewalking ===
Men

#	Athlete	Born	Points
1	(China) Wang Zhaozhao	1 September 1999	1361
2	(Brazil) Caio Bonfim	19 March 1991	1360
3	(Spain) Paul McGrath	7 March 2002	1349
4	(Japan) Toshikazu Yamanishi	15 February 1996	1338
5	(France) Gabriel Bordier	8 October 1997	1315
6	(China) Qian Haifeng	8 July 2000	1309
7	(Japan) Kento Yoshikawa	9 August 2001	1302
8	(Italy) Francesco Fortunato	13 December 1994	1276
9	(Italy) Massimo Stano	27 February 1992	1276
10	(Canada) Evan Dunfee	28 September 1990	1272

Women

#	Athlete	Born	Points
1	(Spain) María Pérez	29 April 1996	1359
2	(Mexico) Alegna González	2 January 1999	1322
3	(Ecuador) Paula Milena Torres	17 October 2000	1292
4	(Peru) Kimberly García	19 October 1993	1281
5	(Australia) Jemima Montag	15 February 1998	1258
6	(Spain) Antia Chamosa	7 October 1999	1256
7	(China) Wu Quanming	16 November 2001	1253
8	(Japan) Nanako Fujii	7 May 1999	1249
9	(Ukraine) Lyudmyla Olyanovska	20 February 1993	1243
10	(Brazil) Viviane Lyra	29 July 1993	1236

=== 35 km racewalking ===
Men

#	Athlete	Born	Points
1	(Canada) Evan Dunfee	28 September 1990	1415
2	(Japan) Hayato Katsuki	28 November 1990	1335
3	(Italy) Massimo Stano	27 February 1992	1316
4	(Brazil) Caio Bonfim	19 March 1991	1310
5	(Germany) Christopher Linke	24 October 1988	1290
6	(China) Zhou Yingcheng	6 October 2000	1286
7	(France) Aurélien Quinion	27 January 1993	1283
8	(Slovakia) Dominik Černý	1 November 1997	1272
9	(Italy) Riccardo Orsoni	20 January 2000	1265
10	(Spain) Daniel Chamosa	4 May 1997	1261

Women

#	Athlete	Born	Points
1	(Spain) María Pérez	29 April 1996	1421
2	(Italy) Antonella Palmisano	6 August 1991	1372
3	(Ecuador) Paula Milena Torres	17 October 2000	1340
4	(Poland) Katarzyna Zdziebło	28 November 1996	1299
5	(China) Peng Li	27 August 2002	1288
6	(Spain) Raquel González	16 November 1989	1265
7	(Ukraine) Hanna Shevchuk	18 July 1996	1264
8	(Spain) Cristina Montesinos	12 July 1994	1258
9	(Australia) Olivia Sandery	22 January 2003	1236
10	(Italy) Nicole Colombi	29 December 1995	1233

=== Decathlon & Heptathlon ===
Men

#	Athlete	Born	Points
1	(Germany) Leo Neugebauer	19 June 2000	1432
2	(Puerto Rico) Ayden Owens-Delerme	28 May 2000	1404
3	(United States) Kyle Garland	28 May 2000	1390
4	(Norway) Sander Skotheim	31 May 2002	1375
5	(Estonia) Johannes Erm	26 March 1998	1366
6	(Germany) Niklas Kaul	11 February 1998	1353
7	(United States) Heath Baldwin	8 February 2001	1305
8	(Switzerland) Simon Ehammer	7 February 2000	1300
9	(United States) Harrison Williams	7 March 1996	1289
10	(France) Makenson Gletty	2 April 1999	1269

Women

#	Athlete	Born	Points
1	(United States) Anna Hall	23 March 2001	1459
2	(Republic of Ireland) Kate O'Connor	12 December 2000	1377
3	(United Kingdom) Katarina Johnson-Thompson	9 January 1993	1372
4	(Belgium) Nafissatou Thiam	19 August 1994	1355
5	(United States) Taliyah Brooks	8 February 1995	1334
6	(Finland) Saga Vanninen	4 May 2003	1319
7	(Netherlands) Sofie Dokter	19 December 2002	1304
8	(Belgium) Noor Vidts	30 May 1996	1278
9	(Germany) Sandrina Sprengel	12 March 2004	1271
10	(Colombia) Martha Araújo	12 May 1996	1271
