= 2026 World Athletics Indoor Championships – Men's shot put =

Men's shot put at the 2026 World Athletics Indoor Championships
- Venue: Kujawsko-Pomorska Arena Toruń
- Location: Toruń, Poland
- Dates: 22 March
- Competitors: 17
- Winning mark: 21.82 m

Medalists
gold medal	Tom Walsh	New Zealand
silver medal	Jordan Geist	United States
bronze medal	Roger Steen	United States

The men's shot put at the 2026 World Athletics Indoor Championships took place on the short track of the Kujawsko-Pomorska Arena Toruń in Toruń, Poland, on 22 March 2026. This was the 22nd time the event was contested at the World Athletics Indoor Championships. Athletes could qualify by achieving the entry standard or by their World Athletics Ranking in the event.

== Background ==
The men's shot put was contested 21 times before 2026, at every previous edition of the World Athletics Indoor Championships.

Records before the 2026 World Athletics Indoor Championships
Record	Athlete (nation)	Distance (m)	Location	Date
World record	Ryan Crouser (USA)	23.56	Los Angeles, United States	27 May 2023
Championship record	Ryan Crouser (USA)	22.77	Glasgow, United Kingdom	1 March 2024
2026 World Lead	Leonardo Fabbri (ITA)	22.50	Stellenbosch, South Africa	11 February 2026

== Qualification ==
For the men's shot put, the qualification period ran from 1 November 2025 until 8 March 2026. Athletes could qualify by achieving the entry standard of 21.20 m. Athletes could also qualify by virtue of their World Athletics Ranking for the event or by virtue of their World Athletics Indoor Tour wildcard. There is a target number of 16 athletes.

== Results ==
=== Final ===
The final was held on 22 March, starting at 11:30 (UTC+1) in the morning.

Results of the final
Place	Athlete	Nation	#1	#2	#3	#4	#5	#6	Result	Notes
1st place, gold medalist(s)	Tom Walsh	New Zealand	20.59	21.21	21.00	21.28	21.66	21.82	21.82	SB
2nd place, silver medalist(s)	Jordan Geist	United States	21.64	x	x	x	x	21.38	21.64	
3rd place, bronze medalist(s)	Roger Steen	United States	19.72	20.44	21.17	x	21.22	21.49	21.49	
4	Scott Lincoln	Great Britain	20.98	21.13	20.78	20.65	21.06	20.88	21.13	SB
5	Wictor Petersson	Sweden	20.15	20.85	21.12	x	x	x	21.12	
6	Josh Awotunde	United States	20.46	20.72	20.96	20.96	x	20.71	20.96	
7	Leonardo Fabbri	Italy	x	20.58	20.75	x	20.92		20.92	
8	Konrad Bukowiecki	Poland	20.62	20.26	x	x	x		20.62	
9	Nick Ponzio	Italy	19.93	20.24	20.37	20.31			20.37	
10	Uziel Muñoz	Mexico	20.30	19.96	x	20.05			20.30	
11	Chukwuebuka Enekwechi	Nigeria	19.79	20.04	x				20.04	
12	Andrei Rares Toader	Romania	19.48	19.91	19.00				19.91	
13	Welington Morais	Brazil	19.91	x	x				19.91	
14	Marcus Thomsen	Norway	19.41	x	x				19.41	
15	Aiden Smith	South Africa	x	x	19.07				19.07	
16	Giorgi Mujaridze	Georgia	18.45	18.88	19.03				19.03	
17	Alexandr Mazur	Moldova	18.98	x	18.84				18.98	
