= Roger Steen =

American athlete (born 1992)

Personal information
- Nationality: United States
- Born: May 17, 1992 (age 34)

Sport
- Sport: Athletics
- Event: Shot put

Achievements and titles
- Personal bests: Shot put: 22.11 (Eugene, 2025)
Medal record
Men's athletics
Representing the United States
World Indoor Championships
Silver medal – second place	2025 Nanjing	Shot put
Bronze medal – third place	2026 Toruń	Shot put
NACAC Championships
Gold medal – first place	2022 Freeport	Shot put

Roger Steen (born May 17, 1992) is an American shot putter. He is the reigning American indoor champion, having won the title at the 2026 USA Indoor Championships. He is a two-time medalist at the World Athletics Indoor Championships.

== Early life ==
Steen grew up in Luck, Wisconsin and studied at the University of Wisconsin-Eau Claire. Steen initially went to college to play American football before being encouraged to join the track and field team.

== Career ==
=== 2022 ===
Steen gained his first international experience in 2022 when he won the gold medal in the shot put at the NACAC Championships in Freeport, Bahamas with a distance of 20.78 metres. He won the Meeting Città di Padova with a 21.38m throw in September 2022.

=== 2023 ===
In May 2023, he threw a lifetime best of 22.08m in Tucson, Arizona. Following that, he won the Spitzen Leichtathletik Luzern with 21.41m. He placed in fourth at the 2023 Pan American Games in Santiago in November 2023, with a distance of 20.51m, missing a medal by 2 cm from compatriot Jordan Geist.

=== 2024 ===
Steen finished as runner-up at the 2024 USA Indoor Track and Field Championships in February 2024. Subsequently, in March 2024 he competed for the a United States at the 2024 World Athletics Indoor Championships in Glasgow, finishing in thirteenth place with 19.97m.

In May 2024, he finished in sixth place at the 2024 Diamond League event the 2024 Prefontaine Classic in Eugene, Oregon.

=== 2025 ===
Steen was runner-up at the 2025 USA Indoor Track and Field Championships. He was selected for the 2025 World Athletics Indoor Championships in Nanjing in March 2025, where he threw 21.62 metres to win the silver medal, just 3 cm behind winner Tom Walsh of New Zealand and ahead of compatriot Adrian Piperi, who won bronze.

In 2025, Steen competed in the first ever World Shot Put Series hosted at Drake University on April 23. After passing the early barriers with relative ease, Steen found himself facing the barrier of 73 feet. On his first attempt, Steen launched the shot passed the 73 ft barrier in an unofficial personal best performance to shoot himself into first place. Despite Adrian Piperi also throwing the 73 ft barrier, Steen was awarded first place due to possessing less overall misses in the event. He finished second with a personal best 22.11 metres at the 2025 Prefontaine Classic.

=== 2026 ===
In February 2026, Steen took an early world lead with a win on the World Athletics Indoor Tour in Belgrade with 22.07 metres. On 1 March 2026, he won the shot put at the 2026 USA Indoor Track and Field Championships, winning ahead of Jordan Geist and Josh Awotunde. On 22 March, he won the bronze medal with a best effort of 21.49 metres at the 2026 World Athletics Indoor Championships in Toruń, Poland.

On 22 April 2026, Steen competed again at the World Shot Put Series hosted at Drake University and threw 73 feet to defend his title against Rajindra Campbell. With 21.25 m he placed fourth at the 2026 Xiamen Diamond League in May, also placing fourth later that month at the 2026 Diamond League meeting in Rabat. At the 2026 Diamond League Final in Brussels in September, he finished fifth with 21.73 metres.

== Personal life ==
Steen works as an assistant coach at his alma mater in Wisconsin.

Steen's first cousin (once removed) is former baseball player Mark Hallberg.
