= Texas Tanner =

American track and field athlete

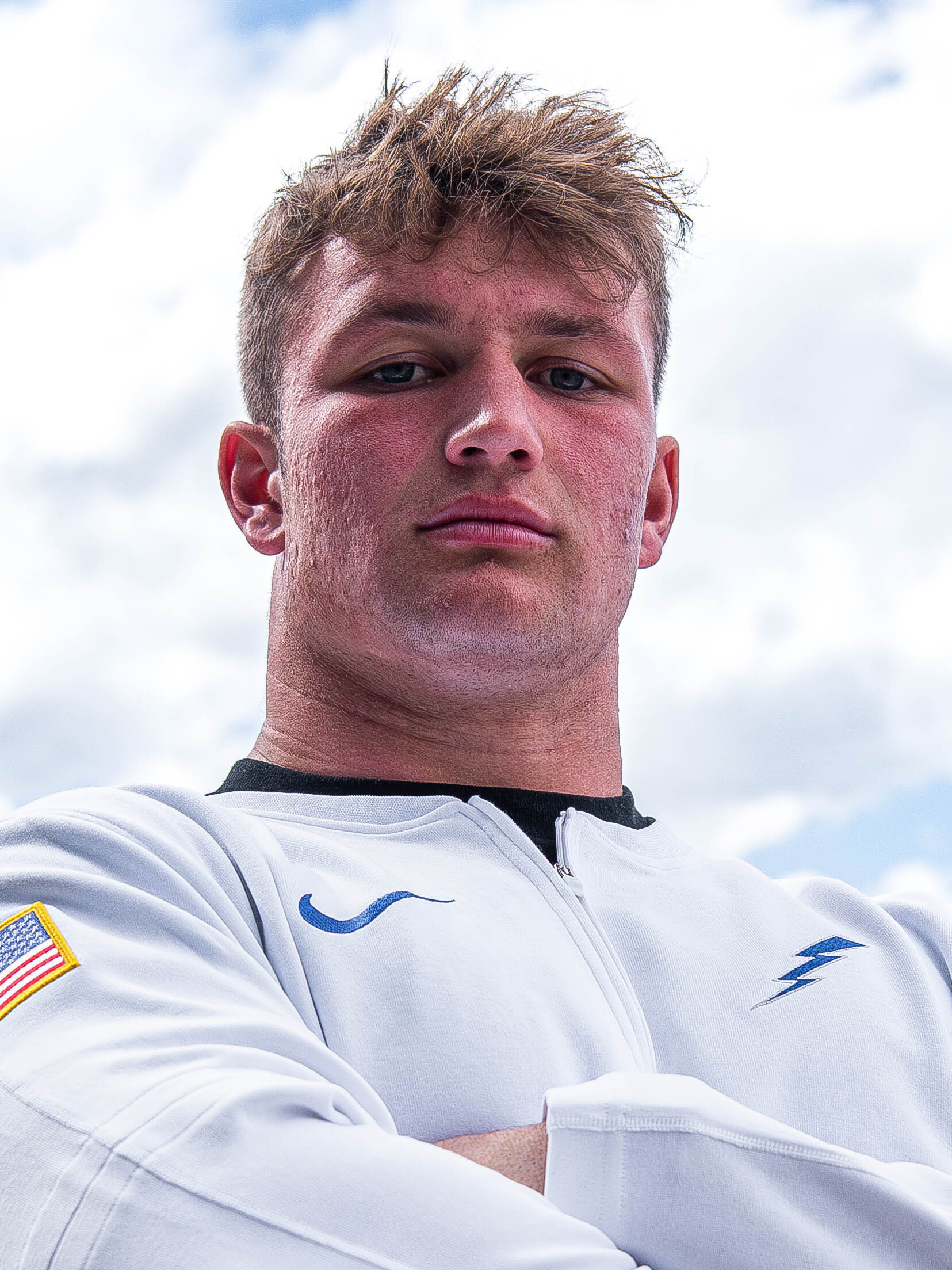
- Tanner in 2024

Personal information
- Full name: Texas Ted Tanner
- Nationality: United States of America
- Education: United States Air Force Academy
- Height: 6 ft 3 in (191 cm)
- Weight: 265 lb (120 kg)

Sport
- Sport: Track and Field
- Events: Discus throw,Hammer throw, Shot Put, Weight throw

Texas Ted Tanner is an American track and field athlete who competes in the discus throw, shot put, weight throw, and hammer throw. He attends the United States Air Force Academy.

== Early life ==
Texas Ted Tanner was born on October 1, 2004, to Craig Tanner and Gina Light. His father is a graduate of the United States Air Force Academy and a former United States Air Force officer who played football at the academy.His mother was the highest ranking graduate in her class at Texas Tech University and a graduate of The University of Texas School of Law. Tanner grew up in a large family with 3 brothers and 2 twin sisters.

Tanner attended Sheridan High School in Sheridan, Wyoming during his Junior and Senior year, where he emerged as a standout multi-sport athlete. In track and field, Tanner specialized in the discus throw and shot put, winning the Class 4A state championship in the discus and finishing as state runner-up in the shot put during his senior season. Tanner recorded a personal-best discus throw of 199 ft 9 in, which ranked among the top throws nationally in 2022. Tanner also won a state indoor title in the shot put. Tanner recorded a personal best of 61 feet and 11 inches in the high school shot put throw.

Tanner was named the 2021–22 Wyoming Gatorade Boys Track and Field Player of the Year, becoming the first athlete from Sheridan High School to receive the honor. In addition to track and field, he played football, earning all-state honors and contributing to a state championship team, and was recognized as one of the top all-around athletes in Wyoming as a finalist for the Milward Simpson Award.

Academically, Tanner maintained a GPA above 4.0 and graduated near the top of his class. He committed to attend the United States Air Force Academy, where he would continue his track and field career.

== Career ==
=== College career ===
Tanner competed for the United States Air Force Academy track and field team, where he developed into one of the program's most accomplished throwers.

==== 2023 season ====
As a freshman, he was named the team's Newcomer of the Year and earned all-conference honors in the shot put after placing third at the Mountain West Indoor Championships. He set freshman class records in both the shot put and weight throw and recorded top-10 marks in program history in the shot put and hammer throw during the outdoor season. Tanner also scored in multiple events at the Mountain West Outdoor Championships and was a two-time Mountain West Freshman of the Week.

==== 2024 season ====
During his sophomore season, Tanner was named the team's Most Valuable Athlete and the USTFCCCA Mountain Region Outdoor Field Athlete of the Year. He qualified for the NCAA Championships in both the discus and hammer throw and won two Mountain West titles. He set conference, service academy, and school records in the hammer throw, culminating in a mark of 237 ft 4 in, and recorded multiple program records in indoor throwing events. Tanner earned four all-conference honors and was named Field Performer of the Meet at the Mountain West Outdoor Championships. Tanner finished 18th at the U.S. Olympic Trials in the Hammer throw.

==== 2025 season ====
In his junior season, Tanner became a two-time All-American, earning first-team honors in the hammer throw after a fourth-place finish at the NCAA Outdoor Championships. He qualified for the NCAA Championships five times and repeated as the USTFCCCA Mountain Region Outdoor Field Athlete of the Year and Mountain West Outdoor Athlete of the Year. Tanner defended his conference titles in the discus and hammer throw with meet-record performances and was again named Field Performer of the Meet at the Mountain West Outdoor Championships.

During the season, he set a Mountain West record in the hammer throw with a mark of 248 ft 9 in and established Air Force and service academy records in the indoor shot put, weight throw, discus, and hammer throw. His discus mark ranked among the top performances in conference history. Tanner also placed fifth in the discus at the USA Track & Field Championships and became the first Air Force men's thrower to qualify for the NCAA Indoor Championships. He was named the team's Most Valuable Athlete for a second consecutive year and received the program's Alonzo Babers Outstanding Performance Award.

==== 2026 season ====
In his senior season, Tanner again broke the Air Force and federal service academy records in indoor shot put (20.25m) to place 5th at the 2026 NCAA Indoor National Championship and earn All American honors. On April 9 in Ramona, Oklahoma, Tanner threw a new personal best of 69.56m in the discus throw and once again broke the Air Force and federal service academy records in discus. This throw was made him the third longest thrower in NCAA history at the time, only behind Mykolas Alekna and Ralford Mullings.

Tanner competed at the 2026 World Shot Put Series at Drake University and won the "Challengers Division" with a throw of 60 feet.

== See also ==
- List of United States collegiate records in track and field
- United States Air Force Academy
