= World Athletics Rankings =

The World Athletics Rankings are an individual athlete ranking system for the sport of athletics, managed by World Athletics. It is used to establish the number one athlete within an athletics event and to partially determine qualification into the World Athletics Championships and the athletics at the Summer Olympics. The rankings are published weekly by World Athletics on Wednesday. WA President Sebastian Coe said the goal of this system is so athletes and fans "have a clear understanding of the hierarchy of competitions from national through to area and up to global events, allowing them to follow a logical season-long path to the pinnacle of athletics' top two competitions".

Based on the work of the late Dr. Bojidar Spiriev and his son Attila, elite athletes are assigned a "ranking score" based on the average of their best performances within a 12-month ranking period, or 18-month period for combined events and distance events of 10,000 m or more. Each athlete performance is assigned a "performance score" which consists of a "result score" plus a "placing score" – the result score is based upon an athlete's best result in the final of a competition and is calculated via the World Athletics Scoring Tables of Athletics (similar to the decathlon scoring method), while the placing score takes into account the athlete's final placing within that competition and the category of the competition, with more placing points being awarded in more prestigious and competitive competitions. Some additional modifications may be made to a performance score to account for wind and course conditions, or the date of the performance. A world record bonus score may be added directly to the athlete's ranking score where an athlete has equalled or broken a world record within the ranking period. The exact scoring rules vary by event, being broadly categorised as track and field, combined track and field events, road running or racewalking.

They were announced in November 2017 and were originally intended to determine qualification for the 2019 World Athletics Championships, but after initial pushback the IAAF announced in November 2018 that it would run the rankings system in 2019 as a dry run without affecting qualification for the 2019 World Championships. The system was used to determine qualification for the 2020 Summer Olympics. A similar ranking system was introduced in 2003 as part of the IAAF World Outdoor Meetings series, though these rankings were only used for qualification to the season-ending IAAF World Athletics Final rather than entry to international competitions.

== Ranking system ==
=== Events ===
There are 46 outdoor men's and women's athletics events that are subject to World Athletics Rankings and categorised as "Main Events". For each sex, this covers nineteen track and field events (seven track running events, three obstacle track events, four jumping events, four throwing events, and a combined event), two road running events, and two racewalking events.

Event grouping	Main outdoor events
Track running	100 metres, 200 metres, 400 metres, 800 metres, 1500 metres, 5000 metres, 10,000 metres
Obstacle events	100 metres hurdles (women only), 110 metres hurdles (men only), 400 metres hurdles, 3000 metres steeplechase
Jumping events	Pole vault, high jump, long jump, triple jump
Throwing events	Shot put, discus throw, javelin throw, hammer throw
Combined events	Decathlon (men only), heptathlon (women only)
Road running	Marathon, road running (either half marathon or 10K run)
Racewalking	20 kilometres race walk, 50 kilometres race walk

In addition, performances in other events classed as "Similar Events" may count towards an athlete's world ranking.

Main event	Similar events	Ref.
100 metres	50 m, 55 m, 60 m	
200 metres	200 m indoor	
400 metres	300 m, 300 m indoor, 400 m indoor, 500 m, 500 m indoor	
800 metres	600 m, 600 m indoor, 800 m indoor, 1000 m, 1000 m indoor	
1500 metres	1500 m indoor, mile, mile indoor, 2000 m, 2000 m indoor	
5000 metres	3000 m, 3000 m indoor, 2 miles, 2 miles indoor, 5000 m indoor	
10,000 metres	5000 m, World Cross Country Championships	
110/100 metres hurdles	50 m hurdles, 55 m hurdles, 60 m hurdles	
3000 metres steeplechase	2000 m steeplechase	
High jump	High jump indoor	
Pole vault	Pole vault indoor	
Long jump	Long jump indoor	
Triple jump	Triple jump indoor	
Shot put	Shot put indoor	
20 km walk	10 km, 15 km, 10,000 m, 15,000 m, and 20,000 m walk (women only: 5000 m, 5 km)	
50 km walk	20 km, 30 km, 35 km, 20,000 m, 30,000 m, and 50,000 m walk	
Marathon	Half marathon, 25 km, and 30 km	
Road running (half marathon or 10K run)	5 km, 10 km, 15 km, 10 miles, and 20 km	
Men's decathlon	indoor heptathlon	
Women's heptathlon	indoor pentathlon	

=== Competition categories ===
There are a total of ten competition categories, which affect the number of points given for a placing score. Competitions are assigned a competition category code based on the level of the competition. There are four special categories for the foremost global and continental competitions, followed by categories ranked from A to F for other competitions. Competitions must adhere to World Athletics rules and have either an World Athletics, area association or national association permit status to be eligible for scoring. Categories apply to the senior age category, unless otherwise stated.

- OW – Olympic Games and World Athletics Championships
- DF – Diamond League final
- GW – World Athletics Indoor Championships, World Athletics Cross Country Championships, World Athletics Half Marathon Championships, World Athletics Race Walking Team Championships, IAAF Continental Cup and Diamond League (Diamond Events only)
- GL – IAAF Hammer Throw, Race Walking and Combined Events Challenges, World Athletics Gold Label Marathons, area senior outdoor championships (e.g. European Athletics Championships)
- A – Major multi-sport events (African, Asian, European, Pan American and Commonwealth Games), IAAF World Challenge, Diamond League (non-Diamond Events only), World Athletics Indoor Tour, World Athletics Gold Label Road Races (non-marathon), World Athletics Silver Label Marathons, area senior indoor or race walking championships (e.g. Asian Indoor Athletics Championships, European Race Walking Cup)
- B – World Athletics Silver Label Road Races (non-marathon), World Athletics Bronze Label Marathons, higher level regional championships and games (Universiade, Francophone Games, Ibero-American Championships, CAC Games, Balkan Championships), top tier area permit meetings (e.g. European Athletics Premium Meetings), area second tier Championships (European Athletics Team Championships Super League, European Combined Events Team Championships Super League), national outdoor championships
- C – Under-20 age category world championships (World Athletics U20 Championships, World Cross Country and World Race Walking Team Championships), second tier area permit meetings (e.g. European Athletics Classic Meetings), World Athletics Bronze Label Road Races (non-marathon), area third tier championships (Area U23 Championships, European Team Championships 1st League, European Combined Events Team Championships 1st League, European Throwing Cup, European 10,000m Cup), lower level regional games and championships (Arab Championships, Mediterranean Games, Military World Games), NCAA Division I Outdoor Championships)
- D – lower level recurring international competitions (e.g. Finnkampen), Area Permit Meetings – Indoor and third tier (senior only), area fourth tier championships (Area U20 Championships, first division area club championships, European Team Championships 2nd League), national indoor championships, Youth Olympic Games
- E – international matches, higher level national permit competitions, international road races, NCAA Division I Indoor Championships, area U18 championships, European Youth Olympic Festival
- F – lower level national permit competitions

=== Result score ===
The scores assigned to an athlete based on a given performance are derived from the World Athletics Scoring Tables of Athletics. Different scores are assigned for outdoor and indoor competition. For throws and hurdles, only performances using senior level throwing implements or hurdles will be considered for scoring.

The effects of wind are considered for the result scores in the following events: 100 metres, 200 metres, 110 metres hurdles, 100 metres hurdles, long jump and triple jump. A lack of a wind speed reading (noted as NWI) in any of these events results in an automatic 30-point deduction from the performance score. A tailwind reading from +0.0 m/s to +2.0 m/s results in no point adjustment. Tailwind readings above +2.0 m/s result in a 0.6-point deduction for each 0.1 m/s of wind, for example +2.1 m/s will have a deduction of 12.6 points. Headwind readings over −0.0 m/s result in a 0.6-point addition for each 0.1 m/s of wind, for example a performance into a −1.0 m/s headwind will receive an additional 6 points. In triple jump and long jump competitions, the athlete's best non-wind-assisted jump may be taken as their best performance of a competition if this receives more points than a further, wind-assisted jump. Special rules also apply to the combined events: if an athlete performance has +4.0 m/s wind assistance or more and the average wind reading in all events is over +2.0 m/s then a 24-point deduction applies. A lack of a wind reading results in an automatic 24-point deduction from the performance score.

For road running events, result score deductions will apply if the overall net drop in elevation of the course exceeds one metre per kilometre of the race distance (e.g. a downhill of over 10 m for a 10K run). Where the net drop exceeds this ratio, then a deduction of 0.6 points will apply for each 0.1 m drop per kilometre, for example performances on a course with a net drop of 1.1 m per kilometre will be subject to a 6.6-point deduction from the result score.

=== Placing score ===
Placing scores vary based on the event, the competition category, and the placing of the athlete. Higher category competitions assign placing scores for a greater number of athletes, from the top 16 placings in the OW category down to only the top 3 athletes in the F category for track and field events. The number of points awarded for a placing ranges from a high of 350 points for winning a track and field event at Olympic or World Championships level down to 5 points for third place in a category F track and field competitions.

Given the variability in course type and distance at the World Athletics Cross Country Championships, that competition awards placing scores only and no performance score is calculated. As a result, a much higher placing score is assigned to this competition.

Event category	Highest score	Lowest score	Ref.
3000 m steeplechase	290 (1st in OW)	4 (3rd in F)	
5000 metres	290 (1st in OW)	4 (3rd in F)	
10,000 metres	270 (1st in OW)	3 (3rd in F)	
Other track and field	350 (1st in OW)	5 (3rd in F)	
Combined events	270 (1st in OW)	3 (3rd in F)	
20 km walk	270 (1st in OW)	3 (3rd in F)	
50 km walk	270 (1st in OW)	1 (3rd in F)	
Marathon	270 (1st in OW)	1 (3rd in F)	
Road running (half marathon or 10K)	270 (1st in OW)	1 (3rd in F)	
World cross country	1300 (1st)	1020 (24th)	

=== Performance score ===
The performance score is the combined total of the placing score and result score of an athlete performance. Only one modification is made to this score, relevant to track and field events only: performances older than 9 months from the ranking date will have 20 points deducted, those older than 10 months will have 40 points deducted, and performances older than 11 months will have 60 points deducted.

=== Ranking score ===
An athlete's ranking score is the average of their best performance scores within the ranking period. The ranking period is 12 months for all field events and track events of 5000 m or less, and is 18 months for 10,000 m, road running, racewalking and combined events. The number of best performances considered for the ranking score varies by event, with five performances considered field events and track events of 1500 metres or less, three performances for the 3000 metres steeplechase, 5000 metres, 20 kilometres race walk and road running (half marathon or 10K run) rankings, and two performances for the 10,000 metres, decathlon, heptathlon, marathon and 50 kilometres race walk.

In all events, athletes will receive additional points in their ranking score if they have broken or equalled a world record in their main event or a similar event, with 20 points for a new record in a main event, 10 points for equalling the record in a main event or a new record in a similar event, and 5 points for equalling a world record in a similar event.

An overweighting rule is applied to performances at the Olympic Games or World Championships (OW), and Diamond League finals (DF). Only one such performance from those competition categories will be used to calculate an athlete's ranking score, even if the athlete has multiple such performances within the ranking period. In contrast, the most recent performance scores at an area senior outdoor championships remain eligible for the ranking calculation even if that performance falls outside of the ranking period.

In order to receive a ranking score, athletes must have recorded a sufficient number of performances scores within the ranking period, and some of these performances scores must be a main event category.

Minimum performances for ranking
Main event	Minimum performances	Minimum in main event	Ref.
3000 metres steeplechase	3	2	
5000 metres	3	2	
10,000 metres	2	1	
Other track and field	5	3	
Decathlon	2	1	
Heptathlon	2	1	
Marathon	2	1	
Road running	3	2	
20 kilometres walk	3	2	
50 kilometres walk	2	1	

== See also ==
- 2019 World Athletics Rankings
- 2019 World Athletics Championships – Entry standards
- 2023 World Athletics Rankings
- 2024 World Athletics Rankings
- 2025 World Athletics Rankings
