= Antoan Richardson =

Bahamian-American baseball player (born 1983)

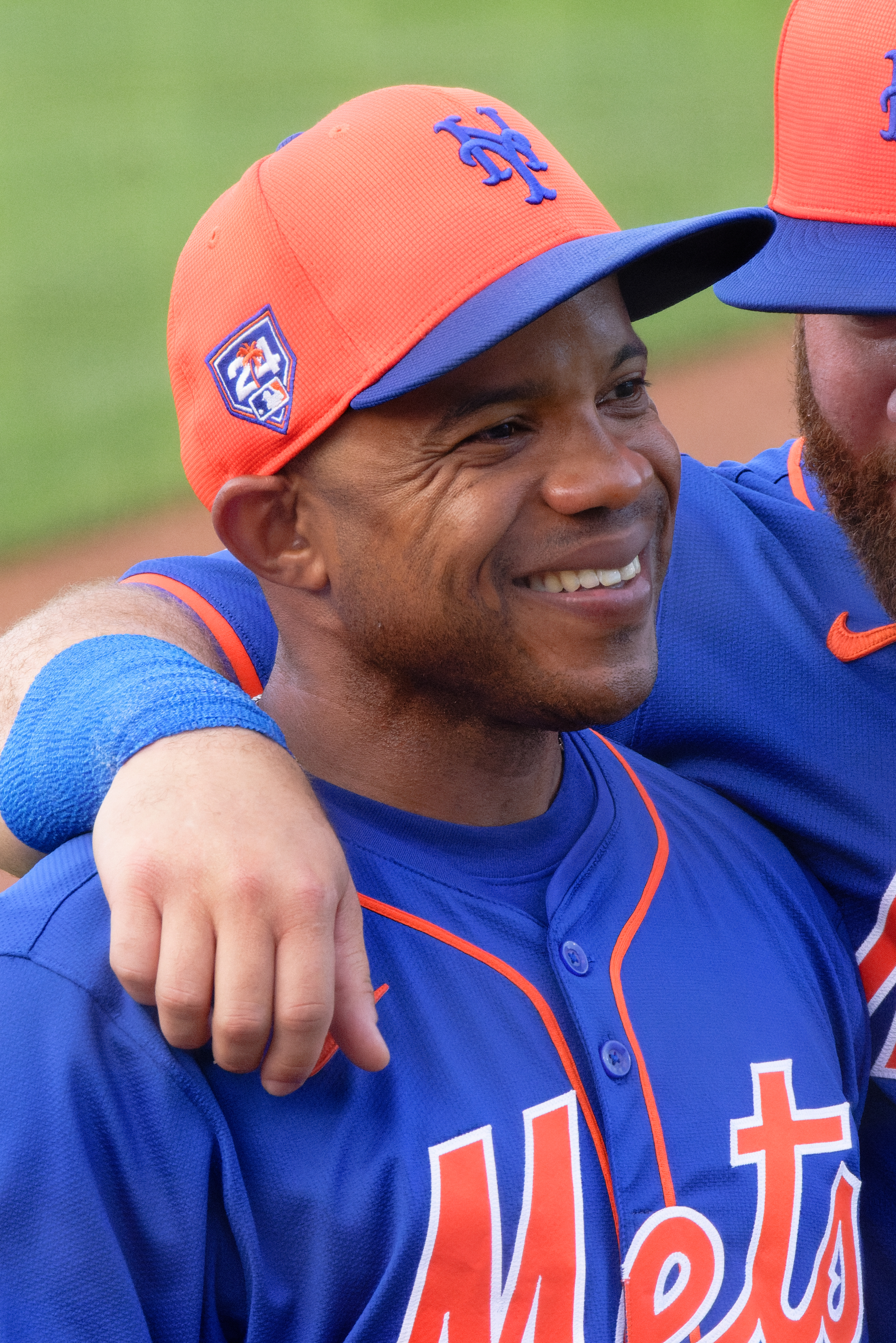
- Richardson with the Mets in 2024

Atlanta Braves – No. 86
- Outfielder / Coach
- Born: October 8, 1983 (age 43); Nassau, The Bahamas
- Batted: Switch Threw: Right

MLB debut
- September 4, 2011, for the Atlanta Braves

Last appearance
- September 28, 2014, for the New York Yankees

MLB statistics
- Batting average: .350
- Home runs: 0
- Runs batted in: 1
- Stats at Baseball Reference

Teams
- As player: Atlanta Braves (2011); New York Yankees (2014); As coach: San Francisco Giants (2020–2023); New York Mets (2024–2025); Atlanta Braves (2026–present)

Antoan Edward Richardson (born October 8, 1983) is a Bahamian-American former professional baseball outfielder who currently serves as the first base coach for the Atlanta Braves of Major League Baseball (MLB). He played in MLB for the Braves and New York Yankees. Before his professional career, he played college baseball at Palm Beach Community College and Vanderbilt University. Richardson served as the first base coach for the San Francisco Giants from 2020 to 2023, as the first base coach for the New York Mets from 2024 to 2025 and as the bench coach for the 2023 Great Britain national baseball team.

== Personal ==
Richardson was born in Nassau, in the Bahamas. He grew up in the Bahamas, raised by his single mother and grandparents. Richardson is a citizen of both the Bahamas and the United States.

In seventh grade, he was cut from his school's softball team. After his playing days, Richardson founded nonprofit organization Project Limestone to provide youth programs that encourage young people to respect their peers, to work together, to define their goals, and set them on a path to achieve those goals. Its focus is in the classroom, in sports, and in the community.

== High school and college ==
Richardson attended American Heritage High School in Delray Beach, a suburb of Boca Raton, Florida, on scholarship after a coach from the school noticed him. There, he played baseball and football and was class salutatorian. As a senior he was named to the 2001 Class 1A All-state high school baseball second team by the Florida Sports Writers Association.

He then attended Palm Beach Community College on an athletic scholarship, passing up an opportunity to attend Brown University on full scholarship. Richardson next attended Vanderbilt University, where he played college baseball for the Vanderbilt Commodores baseball team from 2004 to 2005. He was drafted in the 27th round of the 2001 Major League Baseball draft out of high school, the 27th round of the 2002 Major League Baseball draft, the 13th round of the 2004 Major League Baseball draft, and the 35th round of the 2005 Major League Baseball draft. In 2004, he played collegiate summer baseball with the Orleans Cardinals of the Cape Cod Baseball League. In December 2008 he earned his engineering science degree from Vanderbilt.

== Playing career ==
=== San Francisco Giants ===
The San Francisco Giants signed Richardson after they took him in the 35th round of the 2005 Major League Baseball draft. In 2005 he batted .321/.465 (4th in the league)/.378 with 45 runs (tied for the league lead), 44 walks (leading the league), 7 sacrifice hits (tied for 2nd in the league), 8 hit by pitch (tied for 5th in the league) and 40 stolen bases (leading the league) in 193 at bats for the rookie-level Arizona League Giants, and was a 2005 Post-Season Arizona League All-Star. In 2006 he batted .292/.381/.366 with 7 sacrifice hits (tied for 7th in the league) and 66 stolen bases (3rd) in 418 at-bats for the Augusta GreenJackets of the Single-A California League.

In 2007, Richardson batted .279/.399/.362 with 7 triples (2nd in the league), 67 walks (5th), 11 hit by pitch (9th), and 43 stolen bases (2nd) in 384 at-bats for the San Jose Giants of the High-A South Atlantic League. Baseball America named Richardson the best defensive outfielder in the Giants organization. In 2008 he batted .241/.356/.329 with 12 hit by pitch (leading the league), 10 sacrifice hits (6th), and 33 stolen bases (leading the league) in 365 at-bats for the Connecticut Defenders of the Double-A Eastern League.

Richardson began the 2009 season with Connecticut, batting .207/.320/.287 in 87 at-bats. The Giants released him on July 24, 2009.

=== Schaumburg Flyers ===
He then played for the remainder of 2009 and the beginning of 2010 for the Schaumburg Flyers of the independent Northern League. In 2009 he batted .287/.419/.404 with 20 stolen bases in 94 at-bats, and in 2010 Richardson batted .375/.474/.438 in 16 at-bats.

=== Atlanta Braves ===
In May 2010, Richardson signed a minor league contract with the Atlanta Braves. In the remainder of the 2010 season he played primarily for the Mississippi Braves in the Double-A Southern League, batting .279/.393 (10th in the league)/.316 with 12 hit by pitch (4th) and 24 stolen bases in 272 at-bats.

Richardson played most of 2011 for the Mississippi Braves and batted .283/.430 (tied for second in the league, behind Paul Goldschmidt)/.327 with 11 hit by pitch (fifth) and 17 stolen bases in 272 at-bats. He was a 2011 MiLB.com Atlanta Braves Organization All-Star.

Richardson was called up to the majors for the first time on September 4, 2011, and recorded his first career hit, a single to right field, off Los Angeles Dodgers pitcher Clayton Kershaw in his first career major league at-bat. He became the sixth player from the Bahamas to play in the major leagues. He batted 2-for-4 with a stolen base in 2011 for the Braves. On November 2, Richardson was removed from the 40-man roster and sent outright to the Triple-A Gwinnett Braves.

=== Baltimore Orioles ===
On December 31, 2011, Richardson signed a minor league contract with the Baltimore Orioles. In 2012 he played primarily for the Bowie Baysox of the Double-A Eastern League, batting .279/.415 (3rd in the league)/.331 with 8 sacrifice hits (5th) and 26 stolen bases (6th) in 290 at-bats.

Richardson played three games for Team Great Britain in the World Baseball Classic qualifiers in 2012, going 1-for-10 with a walk.

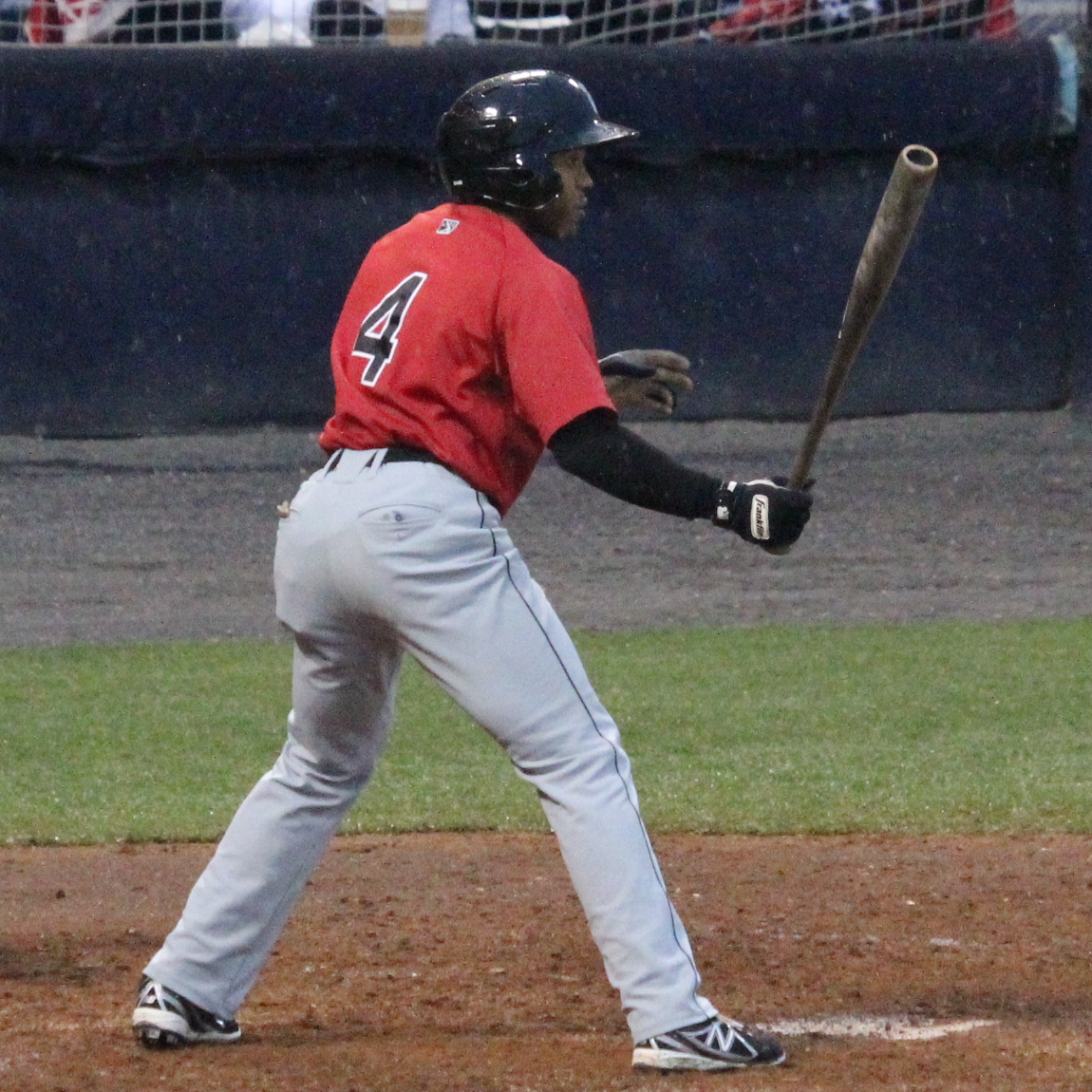
Richardson with the New Britain Rock Cats in 2013

=== Minnesota Twins ===
Richardson signed with the Minnesota Twins organization in February 2013. He split the 2013 season between the New Britain Rock Cats of the Eastern League, for whom he batted .336/.456/.403 with 14 stolen bases in 119 at-bats, and the Rochester Red Wings of the Triple-A International League, for whom he batted .265/.381/.358 with 9 sacrifice hits (tied for 3rd in the league) and 25 stolen bases (5th; while being caught twice) in 302 at-bats. Richardson was a 2013 MiLB.com Minnesota Twins Organization All-Star.

=== New York Yankees ===
On November 13, 2013, Richardson signed a minor league contract with the New York Yankees. He spent the 2014 minor league season with the Scranton/Wilkes-Barre RailRiders in the International League, for whom he batted .271/.380/.364 with 14 hit by pitch (leading the league), seven sacrifice hits (tied for ninth), and 26 stolen bases (fifth; while being caught once) in 258 at-bats. The Yankees promoted Richardson to the major leagues on September 2.

On September 25, Richardson pinch-ran for Jose Pirela in the bottom of the ninth inning against the Baltimore Orioles. He scored the winning run on a walk-off single by Derek Jeter in the final Yankee Stadium at bat of Jeter's career. Overall, for the season, he had five hits in 16 at-bats (.313 batting average), along with five stolen bases without being caught. After the season, he was outrighted off the Yankees roster.

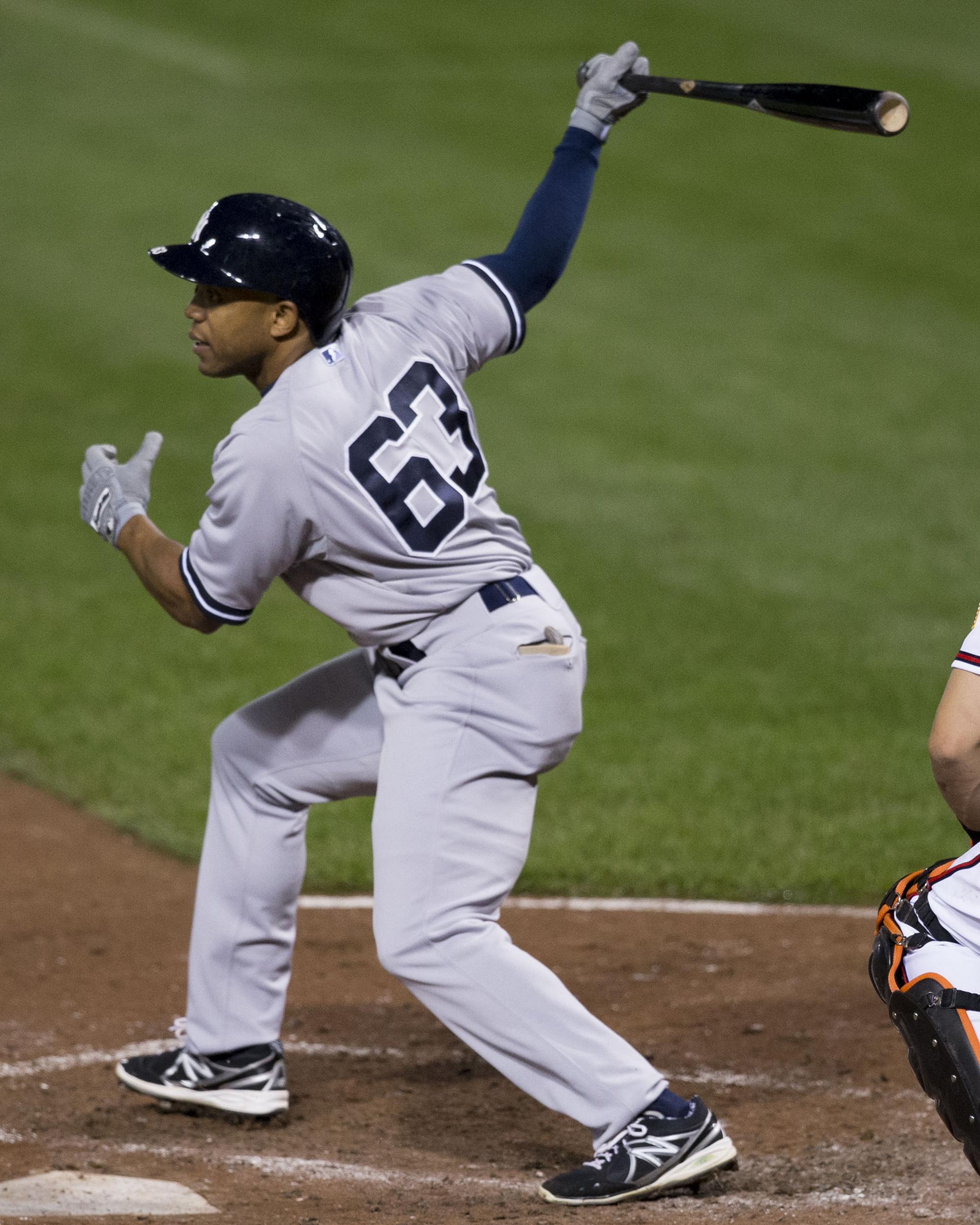
Richardson batting for the New York Yankees in 2014

=== Texas Rangers ===
On December 11, 2014, Richardson signed a minor league contract with the Texas Rangers. He underwent back surgery for a bulging spinal disk on March 27, 2015, and was placed on the 60-day disabled list on April 2. During rehab in Triple-A in July he was hit by a pitch and suffered a broken foot. For the 2015 season, he had only 37 at-bats between the rookie-level Arizona League Rangers and Triple-A Round Rock Express.

=== Pittsburgh Pirates ===
Richardson signed a minor league contract with the Pittsburgh Pirates for the 2016 season, and the Pirates invited Richardson to spring training. He had 16 at bats for the Indianapolis Indians and was released on April 25, 2016.

=== Los Angeles Dodgers ===
Richardson signed a minor league contract with the Los Angeles Dodgers on April 29, 2016, after being released by the Pirates just two days prior. The Dodgers subsequently released him on June 22, after he hit .222 in 15 games for the Triple-A Oklahoma City Dodgers.

=== Southern Maryland Blue Crabs ===
On July 8, 2016, Richardson signed with the Southern Maryland Blue Crabs of the Atlantic League of Professional Baseball. In 34 appearances for the Blue Crabs, Richardson slashed .200/.351/.222 with one RBI and 11 stolen bases.

Richardson retired from professional baseball on March 7, 2017, at 33 years of age. In his 12-season minor league career, while primarily playing center field, Richardson batted .273/.392/.342 in 3,107 at-bats while stealing 331 bases and being caught 58 times. In the major leagues, he batted .350/.381/.350 in 20 at-bats while stealing six bases without being caught.

== Coaching career ==
=== San Francisco Giants ===
In February 2019, Richardson was named as a field coordinator and minor league outfield coordinator for the San Francisco Giants.

On December 23, 2019, Richardson was named the first-base coach of the San Francisco Giants under new manager Gabe Kapler, with the added responsibility of coaching Giants baserunners and outfielders.

During the top of the third inning of a game against the San Diego Padres on April 12, 2022, Richardson was ejected for the first time in his MLB career at any capacity after engaging in an argument with Padres third base coach Mike Shildt. The argument followed after Steven Duggar stole second base with a 9-run lead over the Padres in the second inning. This ejection led to Alyssa Nakken becoming the first woman to appear as an on-field (base) coach in a Major League game by replacing the ejected Richardson.

On November 10, 2023, following the hiring of Matt Williams as third base coach of the Giants for the 2024 season, former third base coach Mark Hallberg was named first base coach, replacing Richardson.

=== New York Mets ===
On November 22, 2023, Richardson was hired by the New York Mets to be their first base coach for the 2024 season. On October 27, 2025, it was announced that Richardson would not return to the Mets in 2026, despite New York making a strong effort to retain him.

=== Atlanta Braves ===
On November 5, 2025, Richardson was hired by the Atlanta Braves as their first base coach, replacing Tom Goodwin.
