= Mark Hallberg =

American baseball coach (born 1985)

Minnesota Twins – No. 68
- Coach
- Born: December 9, 1985 (age 40); Jeddah, Saudi Arabia

Teams
- As coach: San Francisco Giants (2020–2025); Minnesota Twins (2026–present)

Marcus T. Hallberg (born December 9, 1985) is an American professional baseball bench coach in Major League Baseball (MLB) for the Minnesota Twins. A former infielder. During his junior and senior seasons in high school, Hallberg did not strike out once. He then batted .362 in his three-year college career. In 2006, he was the toughest batter in the NCAA to strike out, at once every 36 at-bats. The Arizona Diamondbacks selected Hallberg in the ninth round of the 2007 MLB draft. He played five seasons in the minor leagues, before turning to coaching and managing. He previously served as the first base coach for the San Francisco Giants.

== Early years ==
Hallberg was born in Jeddah, Saudi Arabia. His parents were teachers who lived abroad; Hallberg spent his first eight years living in Jeddah and Riyadh in Saudi Arabia and another five years living in Islamabad, Pakistan. Hallberg moved from Islamabad to Barron, Wisconsin before his sophomore year at Barron High School.

== High school career ==
Hallberg graduated from Barron High School, batting .455 in his high school career. During his junior and senior seasons in high school, Hallberg did not strike out once. As a senior, he had a 5–0 win–loss record with an 0.80 earned run average as a pitcher. He was named All-State three times, and was the 2004 Northwest Wisconsin Player of the Year. In soccer, he led the state in scoring as a senior, with 45 goals. He was inducted into Barron High School's Wall of Honor on December 22, 2017.

== College career ==
Hallberg attended the University of Illinois Chicago for two years, where he played college baseball for the Illinois-Chicago Flames. In his freshman year for the Flames in 2005, he was the fourth-toughest hitter in the nation to strike out, and batted .354, while leading the league in hits (84) and runs (54). He was named to the 2005 Horizon League All-Newcomer Team, and named a 2005 Louisville Slugger Freshman All-American by Collegiate Baseball. In 2006, he was the toughest batter in the NCAA to strike out, at once every 36 at bats, and had a .373/.462/.512 slash line. He was named All-Horizon League First Team in both 2005 and 2006.

Hallberg transferred to Florida State University to play for the Florida State Seminoles for his junior year, and in 2007 Hallberg slashed .360/.447/.476 in 250 at bats, while playing shortstop. He was selected as All-Conference First Team for the Atlantic Coast Conference, Third Team All-American by the American Baseball Coaches Association, and All-American Honorable Mention by Ping. Overall, he had a .362/.438/.486 slash line for his college career.

== Minor league career ==
The Arizona Diamondbacks selected Hallberg in the ninth round, with the 283rd overall selection, of the 2007 Major League Baseball draft, and he signed for a signing bonus of $95,000 and played in Minor League Baseball within the Diamondbacks' farm system. He was the 2008 Hawaii Winter Baseball Most Valuable Player, playing for the West Oahu CaneFires, for whom he batted .362 while playing primarily second base.

In Hallberg's minor-league career, he played 221 games at second base, 168 games at shortstop, and 121 games at third base. In five minor-league seasons, in which he played as high as Triple-A, he batted .277, retiring after a season in which he had a nagging painful throwing arm injury through which he played.

== Coaching and managing career ==
After he retired as a player in April 2012, Hallberg coached the River Falls High School baseball team as he finished his Bachelors degree. From 2014 to 2017, he was assistant coach of the Orleans Firebirds of the Cape Cod Baseball League. He coached for the Salem-Keizer Volcanoes in 2018 and was their manager in 2019. He previously worked as a teacher and recreational coordinator at the American School of Dubai from 2016-2020.

=== San Francisco Giants ===
The San Francisco Giants hired Hallberg as an Assistant Coach in 2020, and he was named their Third Base Coach following the 2021 season.

On November 10, 2023, following the hiring of Matt Williams as the third base coach for the Giants, it was announced that Hallberg would be named first base coach for the 2024 season, replacing Antoan Richardson.

=== Minnesota Twins ===
On November 14, 2025, Hallberg was hired by the Minnesota Twins as their bench coach.

== Education ==
Hallberg holds a Bachelor’s in Health and Human Performance (K-12 Teaching) and a Master’s in Business Administration (MBA).
