= Rajindra Campbell =

Jamaican athlete (born 1996)

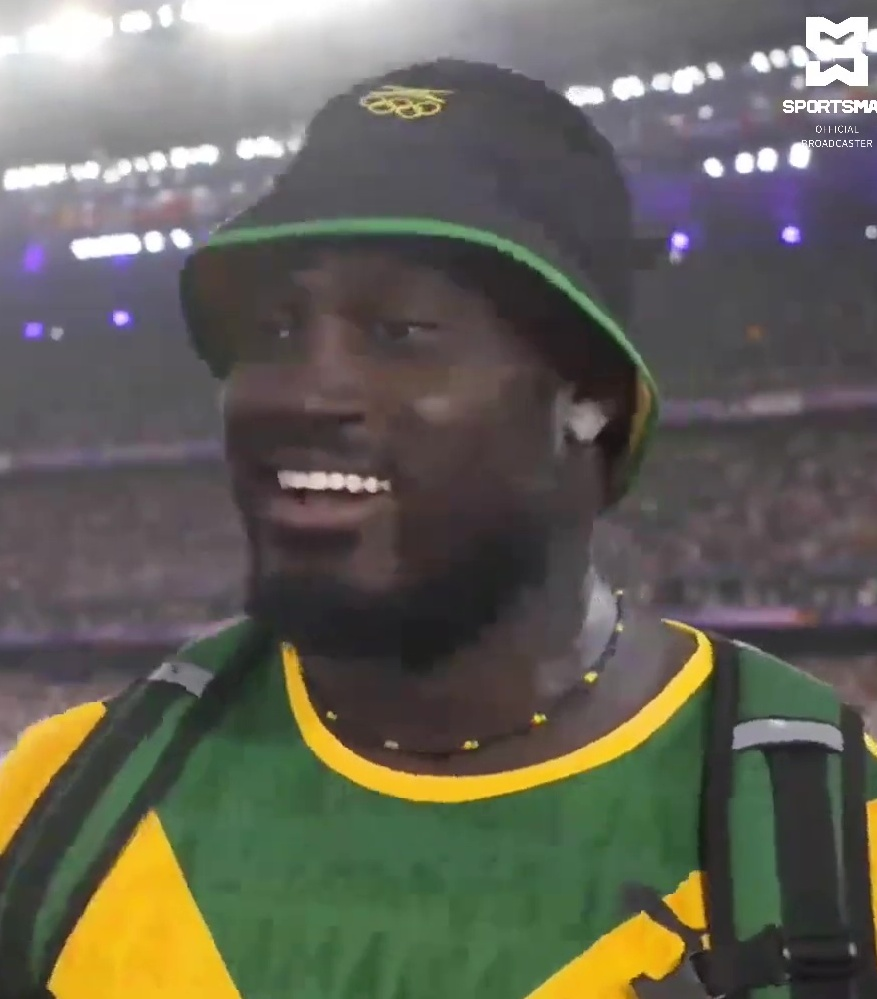
- Campbell at the 2024 Summer Olympics

Personal information
- Nationality: Jamaican
- Born: 29 February 1996 (age 30) Ocho Rios, St.Ann, Jamaica
- Height: 1.85 m (6 ft 1 in)

Sport
- Sport: Athletics
- Event: Shot put
- College team: Missouri Southern Lions

Achievements and titles
- Personal bests: Shot put: 23.08m (Brussels, 2026) NR; Discus: 58.73m (2021)
Medal record
Men's athletics
Representing the Jamaica
Olympic Games
Bronze medal – third place	2024 Paris	Shot put
Diamond League
First place	2026 Brussels	Shot Put
Third place	2025 Zurich	Shot Put

Rajindra Campbell (born 29 February 1996) is a Jamaican-track and field athlete. In 2023, he became the Jamaican national champion and Jamaican national record holder in the shot put for the first time. In 2024, representing Jamaica, he won the bronze medal in Paris at the Olympic Games. He won the 2026 Diamond League shot put title with a new national record of 23.08 metres.

== Early life ==
Campbell attended Ferncourt High School in St. Ann and Kingston College in his native Jamaica before attending Cloud County Community College in Kansas and then Missouri Southern State University.

== Career ==
Campbell won the Jamaican national title in 2023 having improved his personal best to 21.31 metres in May 2023. Campbell set a new Jamaican national shot put record when he threw 22.22 metres in Madrid, Spain in July 2023. He was selected to represent Jamaica at the 2023 World Athletics Championships in Budapest in August 2023, where he qualified for the final but did not register a legal throw.

In February 2024, he competed for Jamaica at the 2024 World Athletics Indoor Championships in Glasgow but did not register a legal throw. In July 2024, he was officially selected for the Jamaican team at the 2024 Paris Olympics. At the Games, he qualified for the final with his single legal throw in qualification of 21.05 metres. He improved that in the final to 22.15 metres and won the bronze medal. American Joe Kovacs equalled Campbell's effort of 22.15 metres but was awarded silver for having the longest second-best effort. Campbell had two legal throws in the final, with a second-best throw of 20.00m. In September 2024 in Zagreb, he extended the Jamaican national record for the shot put to 22.31 metres.

Campbell was named in the Jamaican team for the 2025 World Athletics Indoor Championships in Nanjing in March, placing ninth with a best mark of 20.45 metres. In May 2025 he finished second at the 2025 Meeting International Mohammed VI d'Athlétisme de Rabat, with a throw of 21.95 metres. He finished third at the Diamond League event at the 2025 Golden Gala in Rome on 6 June 2025. He was fifth with a season's best 22.04 metres at the 2025 Prefontaine Classic on 5 July. He placed third at the Diamond League Final in Zurich in August 2025.

In June 2025, it was announced that Campbell was switching allegiance from Jamaica to Turkiye, alongside fellow athlete Rojé Stona. As a result, both athletes did not compete at the 2025 World Athletics Championships. Önder Özbilen, the team coordinator for Turkiye's Olympic athletics team, confirmed the decision to switch allegiance in March 2026. The applications were denied by World Athletics in April 2026 as "inconsistent with the core principles of the regulations".

On 1 February 2026, Campbell won the shot put at the Millrose Games, his best of 21.77 metres placing him ahead of Joe Kovacs. Campbell placed second at the World Shot Put Series against Roger Steen with a throw of 21.95 m. On 23 May, he secured the first Diamond League win of his career, improving his national record by three centimetres to 22.34m at the 2026 Xiamen Diamond League. In June, he won the LA Grand Prix with 21.34 metres. On 25 June, he extended his own national record, with 22.44 metres in Zagreb. On 4 July, he placed second with 22.16 metres at the 2026 Prefontaine Classic. On 27 August, he finished second with 22.22 metres at the 2026 Weltklasse Zürich. At the 2026 Diamond League Final in Brussels on 5 September, Campbell won the title and set a new Jamaican record and meeting record. His 23.08 metres effort in the final round moved him to fourth on the world all-time list. He had previously set a new personal best 22.62 metres in the second round, a distance that would also have been enough for the title. With the win, he also moved into the world lead for the discipline, 34 cm ahead of Leonardo Fabbri. It was the fifth time he had improved the Jamaican national record in 2026. After his victory, he reiterated his desire to represent Türkiye and praised the Turkish federation for helping him to achieve his career best result.

== Personal life ==
Campbell's father named him after former West Indies cricketer Rajindra Dhanraj. Initially, he played cricket as a youngster, but transitioned to the shot put, inspired partly by his brother.
