= World Shot Put Series =

- Status: Active
- Genre: Athletics
- Frequency: Annually
- Years active: 2025-present
- Inaugurated: 2025
- Founder: Ryan Crouser

The World Shot Put Series (WSPS) is a track & field competition created by Ryan Crouser in 2025. Unlike traditional 6-throw contests, the WSPS focuses on hitting increasing distance targets as athletes get eliminated or move on much like a High Jump or Pole Vault contest.

== History ==
The World Shot Put Series was announced by Ryan Crouser in 2024 as a way to showcase elite talent in a non-traditional setting for the Shot Put event. Crouser announced that the first annual WSPS would be hosted by Drake University on April 23, 2025, as an addition to the Drake Relays track and field event.

== Rules ==
The World Shot Put Series is organized in a “king of the ring” format, with athletes eliminated as competition progresses like high jump and pole vault. Throwers are tasked with trying to heave their shot put past a designated line to advance in the competition. This is in contrast to the traditional 6-throw contests where athletes would get three preliminary throws and a chance for additional three finals throws.

Athletes receive two attempts at the designated distance. If an athlete misses twice on a certain distance, then they are out of the contest. However, the athletes can use one "challenge flag" that allows for a third attempt at the distance right away to avoid elimination. Athletes are only allowed to use the challenge flag once per contest.

== List of Contests and Winners ==
There is two divisions at the World Shot Put Series. The Elite Division features professional throwers and the Challengers Division features college athletes. Winners of the Elite Division are awarded the "WSPS Belt" which is a championship belt.

=== Elite Division ===
Elite Men's Division
| Year | Location | Winning Athlete | Winning Distance | Notes |
|---|---|---|---|---|
| 2025 | Drake University | Roger Steen | 73 feet | Won on countback against Trip Piperi |
| 2026 | Drake University | Roger Steen | 73 feet | |

=== Challengers Division ===
| Year | Location | Winning Athlete | College | Winning Distance | Notes |
|---|---|---|---|---|---|
| 2025 | Drake University | Cam Jones | Iowa State | 60 feet | |
| 2026 | Drake University | Texas Tanner | Air Force | 60 feet | |
