= Jordan Geist =

American shot putter (born 1998)

Personal information
- Born: July 21, 1998 (age 28)
- Agent: Mark A Pryor of World Express Sports Mgmt
- Height: 6 ft 2 in (188 cm)

Sport
- Country: United States
- Sport: Track and field
- Event: Shot put
- College team: Arizona Wildcats
Medal record
Men's athletics
Representing United States
World Indoor Championships
Silver medal – second place	2026 Toruń	Shot put
Pan American Games
Silver medal – second place	2019 Lima	Shot put
Bronze medal – third place	2023 Santiago	Shot put

Jordan Geist (born July 21, 1998) is an American shot putter. He won the silver medal in the men's shot put event at the 2019 Pan American Games held in Lima, Peru.

== Early life ==
Geist went to Knoch High School where he set the PA State High School Records for Shot Put and Discus.

== Career ==
Geist won the gold medal in the shot put event at the 2017 Pan American U20 Athletics Championships held in Trujillo, Peru.

In 2019, Geist won the bronze medal in the shot put event at the NCAA Division I Outdoor Track and Field Championships held at Mike A. Myers Stadium in Austin, Texas. A month later, he competed at the 2019 NACAC U18 and U23 Championships in Athletics winning the gold medal this time.

In 2023, he became a National Champion in the shot put event at the NCAA Division I indoor track and field championships in Albuquerque, NM. In 2026 he won the national championship in the same event.

== International competitions ==
Year	Competition	Venue	Position	Event	Notes
Representing United States
2019	Pan American Games	Lima, Peru	2nd	Shot put	20.67 m
2023	Pan American Games	Santiago, Chile	3rd	Shot put	20.53 m
2026	World Indoor Championships	Toruń, Poland	2nd	Shot put	21.64 m
