= 2008 IAAF World Race Walking Cup =

- Organisers: IAAF
- Edition: 23rd
- Date: May 10–11
- Host city: Cheboksary, Chuvashia, Russia
- Events: 5
- Participation: 430 athletes from 53 nations

The 2008 IAAF World Race Walking Cup was held on 10 and 11 May 2008 in the streets of Cheboksary, Chuvashia, Russia.

Detailed reports on the event and an appraisal of the results was given for the IAAF.

Complete results were published.

== Medallists ==
Event	Gold		Silver		Bronze	
Men
Men's 20 km walk	Paquillo Fernández; ESP	1:18:15 CR	Valeriy Borchin; RUS	1:18:21 SB	Eder Sánchez; MEX	1:18:34 PB
Men's 50 km walk	Denis Nizhegorodov; RUS	3:34:14 WR	Alex Schwazer; ITA	3:37:04 SB	Trond Nymark; NOR	3:44:59 SB
Men's 10 km walk (junior event)	Aleksey Bartsaykin; RUS	39:57 WJR	Chen Ding; CHN	40:12 PB	Denis Strelkov; RUS	40:17
Team (Men)
Team (Men 20 km)	Russia	11 pts	Spain	22 pts	Australia	47 pts
Team (Men 50 km)	Italy	28 pts	Mexico	29 pts	Spain	30 pts
Team (Men 10 km Junior)	Russia	4 pts	China	7 pts	Spain	10 pts
Women
Women's 20 km walk	Olga Kaniskina; RUS	1:25:42 CR	Tatyana Sibileva; RUS	1:26:29	Vera Santos; POR	1:28:17 PB
Women's 10 km walk (junior event)	Tatyana Kalmykova; RUS	42:44 CR	Irina Yumanova; RUS	43:23	Elmira Alembekova; RUS	44:39
Team (Women)
Team (Women 20 km)	Russia	7 pts	Portugal	24 pts	Spain	38 pts
Team (Women 10 km Junior)	Russia	3 pts	Romania	11 pts	Colombia	18 pts

== Results ==
=== Men's 20 km ===
Place	Athlete	Nation	Time	Notes
1st place, gold medalist(s)	Paquillo Fernández	Spain (ESP)	1:18:15	CR
2nd place, silver medalist(s)	Valeriy Borchin	Russia (RUS)	1:18:21	SB
3rd place, bronze medalist(s)	Eder Sánchez	Mexico (MEX)	1:18:34	PB
4	Ilya Markov	Russia (RUS)	1:19:04	SB
5	Andrey Krivov	Russia (RUS)	1:19:10	
6	Erik Tysse	Norway (NOR)	1:19:11	NR
7	Luke Adams	Australia (AUS)	1:19:15	PB
8	Juan Manuel Molina	Spain (ESP)	1:19:19	PB
9	Robert Heffernan	Ireland (IRL)	1:19:22	NR
10	Jared Tallent	Australia (AUS)	1:19:48	
11	Hatem Ghoula	Tunisia (TUN)	1:19:54	SB
12	Rolando Saquipay	Ecuador (ECU)	1:20:40	SB
13	Benjamin Sánchez	Spain (ESP)	1:20:48	PB
14	Ivan Trotski	Belarus (BLR)	1:20:56	
15	João Vieira	Portugal (POR)	1:21:13	
16	Ivano Brugnetti	Italy (ITA)	1:21:19	
17	Matej Tóth	Slovakia (SVK)	1:21:24	PB
18	Sérgio Vieira	Portugal (POR)	1:21:25	PB
19	Jean-Jacques Nkouloukidi	Italy (ITA)	1:21:45	SB
20	Kim Hyun-Sub	South Korea (KOR)	1:22:01	
21	Park Chil-Seong	South Korea (KOR)	1:22:02	
22	Han Yucheng	China (CHN)	1:22:24	
23	Luis Fernando López	Colombia (COL)	1:22:25	
24	James Rendón	Colombia (COL)	1:22:34	
25	Sergey Chernov	Belarus (BLR)	1:22:39	
26	Lu Ronghua	China (CHN)	1:22:41	
27	David Mejía	Mexico (MEX)	1:22:47	
28	Andriy Kovenko	Ukraine (UKR)	1:22:48	
29	Fortunato DʼOnofrio	Italy (ITA)	1:22:55	
30	Chris Erickson	Australia (AUS)	1:22:55	
31	Álvaro García	Mexico (MEX)	1:23:07	
32	Allan Segura	Costa Rica (CRC)	1:23:12	
33	Denis Simanovich	Belarus (BLR)	1:23:31	
34	Andriy Talashko	Belarus (BLR)	1:23:44	
35	Miguel Ángel López	Spain (ESP)	1:23:44	
36	Wei Yang	China (CHN)	1:23:47	
37	Recep Celik	Turkey (TUR)	1:24:01	
38	Predrag Filipović	Serbia (SRB)	1:24:07	
39	Andrés Chocho	Ecuador (ECU)	1:24:08	
40	Jakub Jelonek	Poland (POL)	1:24:26	
41	John García	Colombia (COL)	1:24:26	
42	Gabriel Ortíz	Mexico (MEX)	1:24:36	
43	Adam Rutter	Australia (AUS)	1:24:57	
44	Pedro Gómez	Mexico (MEX)	1:25:06	
45	Donatas Škarnulis	Lithuania (LTU)	1:25:08	
46	Rafał Fedaczyński	Poland (POL)	1:25:13	
47	Mauricio Arteaga	Ecuador (ECU)	1:25:13	
48	Diogo Martins	Portugal (POR)	1:25:18	
49	Emmanuel Boulay	France (FRA)	1:25:21	
50	Pedro Isidro	Portugal (POR)	1:25:22	
51	Vilius Mikelionis	Lithuania (LTU)	1:25:24	
52	Ruslan Dmytrenko	Ukraine (UKR)	1:25:26	
53	Eddy Riva	France (FRA)	1:25:34	
54	Andreas Erm	Germany (GER)	1:25:39	
55	Rafał Augustyn	Poland (POL)	1:25:45	
56	Nenad Filipović	Serbia (SRB)	1:25:48	
57	Vladimir Savanović	Serbia (SRB)	1:25:54	
58	Jamie Costin	Ireland (IRL)	1:25:59	
59	Nazar Kovalenko	Ukraine (UKR)	1:26:04	
60	Tadas Šuškevičius	Lithuania (LTU)	1:26:05	
61	Francisco Arcilla	Spain (ESP)	1:26:16	
62	Gustavo Restrepo	Colombia (COL)	1:26:25	
63	Daniele Paris	Italy (ITA)	1:26:25	
64	Carsten Schmidt	Germany (GER)	1:26:26	
65	Juan Manuel Cano	Argentina (ARG)	1:26:36	
66	Aleksandr Kuzmin	Belarus (BLR)	1:26:38	
67	Theódoros Koupidis	Greece (GRE)	1:26:39	
68	Marius Žiūkas	Lithuania (LTU)	1:26:45	
69	Christopher Linke	Germany (GER)	1:27:49	
70	Rustam Kuvatov	Kazakhstan (KAZ)	1:27:56	
71	Anibal Paau	Guatemala (GUA)	1:28:17	
72	Anatole Ibáñez	Sweden (SWE)	1:28:36	
73	Artur Brzozowski	Poland (POL)	1:28:59	
74	Aleksandr Venglovskyy	Ukraine (UKR)	1:29:00	
75	Gyula Dudás	Hungary (HUN)	1:30:43	
76	Roman Bílek	Czech Republic (CZE)	1:30:47	
77	Franck Delree	France (FRA)	1:30:49	
78	Cui Zhide	China (CHN)	1:31:46	
79	John Nunn	United States (USA)	1:31:47	
80	Michael Tarantino	United States (USA)	1:32:04	
81	Alibek Abdinur	Kazakhstan (KAZ)	1:32:13	
82	Damien Molmy	France (FRA)	1:32:43	
83	Fedosey Chumachenko	Moldova (MDA)	1:32:51	
84	Taras Kozlyuk	Ukraine (UKR)	1:32:52	
85	Lauri Lelumees	Estonia (EST)	1:33:53	
86	Jacques van Bremen	Netherlands (NED)	1:34:40	
87	Pavel Chihuan	Peru (PER)	1:34:58	
88	Claudio Villanueva	Ecuador (ECU)	1:35:00	
89	Arne Martinsen	Norway (NOR)	1:36:13	
90	Wael Abelrahman	Egypt (EGY)	1:36:50	
91	Vitaliy Anichkin	Kazakhstan (KAZ)	1:37:13	
92	Noel Santini	Puerto Rico (PUR)	1:37:59	
93	Tim Seaman	United States (USA)	1:38:11	
94	Levente Kapéri	Hungary (HUN)	1:38:14	
95	Chris Tegtmeier	United States (USA)	1:39:23	
96	Christopher Bürki	Switzerland (SUI)	1:41:25	
97	Abdurrahim Celik	Turkey (TUR)		
98	Yusuf Alpkaya	Turkey (TUR)	1:44:59	
99	Patrick Stroupe	United States (USA)	1:46:34	
100	Alexander Maier	Austria (AUT)	1:57:03	
—	Luis Gómez	Guatemala (GUA)	DQ	
—	Amir Khairgo	Iran (IRI)	DQ	
—	Sergey Bakulin	Russia (RUS)	DQ	
—	Viktor Burayev	Russia (RUS)	DQ	Doping^{†}
—	Dietmar Hirschmugl	Austria (AUT)	DNF	
—	José Alessandro Bagio	Brazil (BRA)	DNF	
—	Rafael Duarte	Brazil (BRA)	DNF	
—	Bertrand Moulinet	France (FRA)	DNF	
—	Hannes Tonat	Germany (GER)	DNF	
—	Sándor Rácz	Hungary (HUN)	DNF	
—	Teoh Boon Lim	Malaysia (MAS)	DNF	
—	Grzegorz Sudoł	Poland (POL)	DNF	

^{†}: Viktor Burayev from Russia was initially 24th (1:22:29), but disqualified because of doping violations.

==== Team (20 km Men) ====
Place	Country	Points
1st place, gold medalist(s)	Russia	11 pts
2nd place, silver medalist(s)	Spain	22 pts
3rd place, bronze medalist(s)	Australia	47 pts
4	Mexico	61 pts
5	Italy	64 pts
6	Belarus	72 pts
7	Portugal	81 pts
8	China	84 pts
9	Colombia	88 pts
10	Ecuador	98 pts
11	Ukraine	139 pts
12	Poland	141 pts
13	Serbia	151 pts
14	Lithuania	156 pts
15	France	179 pts
16	Germany	187 pts
17	Turkey	232 pts
18	Kazakhstan	242 pts
19	United States	252 pts

=== Men's 50 km ===
Place	Athlete	Nation	Time	Notes
1st place, gold medalist(s)	Denis Nizhegorodov	Russia (RUS)	3:34:14	CR
2nd place, silver medalist(s)	Alex Schwazer	Italy (ITA)	3:37:04	SB
3rd place, bronze medalist(s)	Trond Nymark	Norway (NOR)	3:44:59	SB
4	Mikel Odriozola	Spain (ESP)	3:47:30	SB
5	Horacio Nava	Mexico (MEX)	3:47:55	PB
6	Sergey Kirdyapkin	Russia (RUS)	3:48:29	SB
7	André Höhne	Germany (GER)	3:49:03	SB
8	Marco De Luca	Italy (ITA)	3:49:21	SB
9	Ingus Janevics	Latvia (LAT)	3:49:50	PB
10	Oleksiy Kazanin	Ukraine (UKR)	3:50:30	PB
11	Mario Iván Flores	Mexico (MEX)	3:51:16	SB
12	José Alejandro Cambil	Spain (ESP)	3:51:20	PB
13	Jesús Sánchez	Mexico (MEX)	3:51:29	PB
14	Jesús Angel García	Spain (ESP)	3:52:31	SB
15	Igors Kazakevics	Latvia (LAT)	3:52:45	PB
16	António Pereira	Portugal (POR)	3:53:11	SB
17	Daniel García	Mexico (MEX)	3:53:42	SB
18	Diego Cafagna	Italy (ITA)	3:53:46	PB
19	Zhao Jianguo	China (CHN)	3:54:18	SB
20	Sun Chao	China (CHN)	3:54:52	
21	Andrey Stepanchuk	Belarus (BLR)	3:55:09	
22	Aleksey Shelest	Ukraine (UKR)	3:55:16	
23	Omar Zepeda	Mexico (MEX)	3:56:52	
24	Colin Griffin	Ireland (IRL)	3:58:26	
25	Mário dos Santos	Brazil (BRA)	3:58:30	
26	Luis García	Guatemala (GUA)	3:58:33	
27	Rafał Sikora	Poland (POL)	3:59:25	
28	Sergiy Budza	Ukraine (UKR)	3:59:32	
29	Fausto Quinde	Ecuador (ECU)	3:59:33	
30	Cláudio dos Santos	Brazil (BRA)	4:00:24	
31	Augusto Cardoso	Portugal (POR)	4:00:52	
32	Jorge Costa	Portugal (POR)	4:01:05	
33	Santiago Pérez	Spain (ESP)	4:02:09	
34	Dario Privitera	Italy (ITA)	4:02:32	
35	Fredrik Svensson	Sweden (SWE)	4:02:45	
36	Sébastien Biche	France (FRA)	4:04:08	
37	Francisco Pinardo	Spain (ESP)	4:04:43	
38	Eddy Roze	France (FRA)	4:05:03	
39	Philip Dunn	United States (USA)	4:05:10	
40	Pedro Martins	Portugal (POR)	4:05:17	
41	Gao Lianzuo	China (CHN)	4:05:19	
42	Konstadínos Stefanópoulos	Greece (GRE)	4:05:24	
43	Dušan Majdan	Slovakia (SVK)	4:08:56	
44	Johan Augeron	France (FRA)	4:10:05	
45	Zoltán Czukor	Hungary (HUN)	4:10:43	
46	Miloš Holuša	Czech Republic (CZE)	4:10:55	
47	Arnis Rumbenieks	Latvia (LAT)	4:12:13	
48	Maik Berger	Germany (GER)	4:12:15	
49	Jani Lehtinen	Finland (FIN)	4:12:55	
50	Edwin Ochoa	Ecuador (ECU)	4:13:00	
51	David Guevara	Ecuador (ECU)	4:15:22	
52	Duane Cousins	Australia (AUS)	4:15:34	
53	Lim Jung-Hyun	South Korea (KOR)	4:17:11	
54	Valerijus Grinko	Lithuania (LTU)	4:18:19	
55	Ben Shorey	United States (USA)	4:18:46	
56	Matteo Giupponi	Italy (ITA)	4:20:10	
57	Steve Quirke	United States (USA)	4:22:16	
58	László Novák	Hungary (HUN)	4:23:53	
59	Dom King	Great Britain (GBR)	4:25:26	
60	Christer Svensson	Sweden (SWE)	4:26:54	
61	Predrag Krstović	Serbia (SRB)	4:29:44	
62	Harminder Singh	India (IND)	4:35:24	
63	Bruno Grandjean	Switzerland (SUI)	4:35:59	
64	Urbain Girod	Switzerland (SUI)	4:36:28	
65	Yury Varanchuk	Belarus (BLR)	4:38:20	
66	Timo Viljanen	Finland (FIN)	4:41:37	
67	Ray Sharp	United States (USA)	4:42:00	
68	Basanta Bahadur Rana	India (IND)	4:43:09	
69	Vitaliy Sleptsov	Kazakhstan (KAZ)	4:48:05	
70	Jalan Parayil	India (IND)	5:04:31	
—	Aleksandr Kazakov	Belarus (BLR)	DQ	
—	Xing Shucai	China (CHN)	DQ	
—	Salvador Mira	El Salvador (ESA)	DQ	
—	Daniel King	Great Britain (GBR)	DQ	
—	Attila Fülöp	Hungary (HUN)	DQ	
—	Chandan Singh	India (IND)	DQ	
—	Lee Dae-Ro	South Korea (KOR)	DQ	
—	Harold van Beek	Netherlands (NED)	DQ	
—	Fabio Ruzzier	Slovenia (SLO)	DQ	
—	Vladimir Kanaykin	Russia (RUS)	DQ	Doping^{†}
—	Alexey Litvinchuk	Belarus (BLR)	DNF	
—	Vitaliy Talankov	Belarus (BLR)	DNF	
—	Cristián Bascuñán	Chile (CHI)	DNF	
—	Xavier Moreno	Ecuador (ECU)	DNF	
—	Mesias Zapata	Ecuador (ECU)	DNF	
—	Marco Benavides	El Salvador (ESA)	DNF	
—	Antti Kempas	Finland (FIN)	DNF	
—	Hervé Davaux	France (FRA)	DNF	
—	Denis Langlois	France (FRA)	DNF	
—	Babubhai Panucha	India (IND)	DNF	
—	Vjačeslavs Grigorjevs	Latvia (LAT)	DNF	
—	Ricard Rekst	Lithuania (LTU)	DNF	
—	Dionisio Ventura	Portugal (POR)	DNF	
—	Andrey Ruzavin	Russia (RUS)	DNF	
—	Igor Yerokhin	Russia (RUS)	DNF	
—	Kazimír Verkin	Slovakia (SVK)	DNF	
—	Andreas Gustafsson	Sweden (SWE)	DNF	
—	Chokirjon Irmatov	Tajikistan (TJK)	DNF	
—	Ivan Losev	Ukraine (UKR)	DNF	
—	Aleksandr Romanenko	Ukraine (UKR)	DNF	
—	Matthew Boyles	United States (USA)	DNF	

^{†}: Vladimir Kanaykin from Russia was initially 2nd and silver medallist in 3:36:55, but disqualified because of doping violations.

==== Team (50 km Men) ====
Place	Country	Points
1st place, gold medalist(s)	Italy	28 pts
2nd place, silver medalist(s)	Mexico	29 pts
3rd place, bronze medalist(s)	Spain	30 pts
4	Ukraine	60 pts
5	Latvia	71 pts
6	Portugal	79 pts
7	China	80 pts
8	France	118 pts
9	Ecuador	130 pts
10	United States	151 pts
11	India	200 pts

=== Men's 10 km (Junior) ===
Place	Athlete	Nation	Time	Notes
1st place, gold medalist(s)	Aleksey Barchaykin	Russia (RUS)	39:57	
2nd place, silver medalist(s)	Chen Ding	China (CHN)	40:12	
3rd place, bronze medalist(s)	Denis Strelkov	Russia (RUS)	40:17	
4	Lluís Torlá	Spain (ESP)	40:21	
5	Zhang Rui	China (CHN)	41:08	
6	Manel Torla	Spain (ESP)	42:12	
7	Federico Tontodonati	Italy (ITA)	42:18	
8	Adrian Ochoa	Mexico (MEX)	42:28	
9	Ricardo Lojan	Ecuador (ECU)	42:37	
10	José Leonardo Montaña	Colombia (COL)	42:37	
11	Máté Helebrandt	Hungary (HUN)	42:39	
12	Riccardo Macchia	Italy (ITA)	42:41	
13	Dejaime de Oliveira	Brazil (BRA)	42:51	
14	Vito Di Bari	Italy (ITA)	42:54	
15	Clemente García	Mexico (MEX)	43:07	
16	Aliaksandr Lyakhovich	Belarus (BLR)	43:10	
17	Julián Rendón	Colombia (COL)	43:17	
18	Emerson Hernández	El Salvador (ESA)	43:18	
19	Mehdu Boufraine	France (FRA)	43:24	
20	Viktor Golubnychiy	Ukraine (UKR)	43:27	
21	Veli-Matti Partanen	Finland (FIN)	43:28	
22	Luís Lopes	Portugal (POR)	43:28	
23	Wojciech Halman	Poland (POL)	43:32	
24	Patryk Rogowski	Poland (POL)	43:42	
25	Siarhei Shauchuk	Belarus (BLR)	43:55	
26	Daniel Coleman	Australia (AUS)	43:57	
27	Louis Blanc	France (FRA)	43:58	
28	Christoph Roschinsky	Germany (GER)	44:07	
29	Genadij Kozlovskij	Lithuania (LTU)	44:07	
30	Tomasz Wiater	Poland (POL)	44:10	
31	Luís Alberto Amezcua	Spain (ESP)	44:30	
32	Georgiy Sheiko	Kazakhstan (KAZ)	44:30	
33	Perseus Ibáñez-Karlström	Sweden (SWE)	44:39	
34	Hagen Pohle	Germany (GER)	44:43	
35	Dzmitry Dziubin	Belarus (BLR)	44:47	
36	Yuriy Loktionov	Ukraine (UKR)	45:03	
37	Viktor Parfenyuk	Ukraine (UKR)	45:10	
38	Ben Wears	Great Britain (GBR)	45:22	
39	Rhydian Cowley	Australia (AUS)	45:24	
40	Matias Korpela	Finland (FIN)	45:46	
41	Paul Fitzpatrick	Ireland (IRL)	46:11	
42	Trevor Barron	United States (USA)	46:18	
43	Brendon Reading	Australia (AUS)	46:33	
44	Jakub Zajíc	Czech Republic (CZE)	46:37	
45	Ridvan Celik	Turkey (TUR)	46:40	
46	Lukáš Gdula	Czech Republic (CZE)	46:46	
47	Håvard Haukenes	Norway (NOR)	46:53	
48	Alexander Velázquez	Guatemala (GUA)	47:00	
49	Karel Ketner	Czech Republic (CZE)	47:20	
50	Ainar Veskus	Estonia (EST)	47:24	
51	Matthew Forgues	United States (USA)	47:46	
52	Viktor Nemes	Hungary (HUN)	47:51	
53	Dénes Papp	Hungary (HUN)	47:58	
54	Roberto Vergara	United States (USA)	48:29	
55	Tacettin Kaya	Turkey (TUR)	49:36	
56	Ahmed Hamada	Egypt (EGY)	49:49	
57	Risko Nogelainen	Estonia (EST)	50:28	
58	Sabry Ahmed	Egypt (EGY)	50:59	
59	Kemal Gelecek	Turkey (TUR)	52:46	
—	Caio Bonfim	Brazil (BRA)	DQ	
—	Mihaíl Yelastós	Greece (GRE)	DQ	
—	Isaac Palma	Mexico (MEX)	DQ	
—	Edikt Khaybullin	Russia (RUS)	DQ	

==== Team (10 km Men Junior) ====
Place	Country	Points
1st place, gold medalist(s)	Russia	4 pts
2nd place, silver medalist(s)	China	7 pts
3rd place, bronze medalist(s)	Spain	10 pts
4	Italy	19 pts
5	Mexico	23 pts
6	Colombia	27 pts
7	Belarus	41 pts
8	France	46 pts
9	Poland	47 pts
10	Ukraine	56 pts
11	Finland	61 pts
12	Germany	62 pts
13	Hungary	63 pts
14	Australia	65 pts
15	Czech Republic	90 pts
16	United States	93 pts
17	Turkey	100 pts
18	Estonia	107 pts
19	Egypt	114 pts

=== Women's 20 km ===
Place	Athlete	Nation	Time	Notes
1st place, gold medalist(s)	Olga Kaniskina	Russia (RUS)	1:25:42	CR
2nd place, silver medalist(s)	Tatyana Sibileva	Russia (RUS)	1:26:29	
3rd place, bronze medalist(s)	Vera Santos	Portugal (POR)	1:28:17	PB
4	Lyudmila Arkhipova	Russia (RUS)	1:28:29	
5	María Vasco	Spain (ESP)	1:28:39	SB
6	Olive Loughnane	Ireland (IRL)	1:29:17	PB
7	Jane Saville	Australia (AUS)	1:29:27	SB
8	María José Poves	Spain (ESP)	1:29:31	PB
9	Elena Ginko	Belarus (BLR)	1:29:35	SB
10	Susana Feitor	Portugal (POR)	1:29:38	
11	Ana Cabecinha	Portugal (POR)	1:29:39	PB
12	Sonata Milušauskaité	Lithuania (LTU)	1:30:35	NR
13	Sabine Zimmer	Germany (GER)	1:30:39	SB
14	Athanasia Tsoumeleka	Greece (GRE)	1:30:40	
15	Melanie Seeger	Germany (GER)	1:31:09	
16	Vira Zozulya	Ukraine (UKR)	1:31:12	
17	Kristina Saltanovic	Lithuania (LTU)	1:31:21	SB
18	Ana Maria Groza	Romania (ROM)	1:31:37	SB
19	Inês Henriques	Portugal (POR)	1:32:35	
20	Elisa Rigaudo	Italy (ITA)	1:32:38	SB
21	Claudia Ștef	Romania (ROU)	1:33:19	
22	Sandra Zapata	Colombia (COL)	1:33:22	
23	Tânia Spindler	Brazil (BRA)	1:33:23	
24	Cisiane Lopes BRA	1:33:44		
25	Beatriz Pascual	Spain (ESP)	1:33:55	
26	Maribel Gonçalves	Portugal (POR)	1:33:56	
27	Valentina Trapletti	Italy (ITA)	1:34:10	
28	Rocío Florido	Spain (ESP)	1:34:26	
29	Agnieszka Dygacz	Poland (POL)	1:34:27	
30	Zhanna Golovnya	Belarus (BLR)	1:34:56	
31	Claire Woods-Tallent	Australia (AUS)	1:35:01	
32	Neringa Aidietytė	Lithuania (LTU)	1:35:10	
33	Monica Svensson	Sweden (SWE)	1:35:18	
34	Mayte Gargallo	Spain (ESP)	1:35:37	
35	Zuzana Schindlerová	Czech Republic (CZE)	1:36:10	
36	He Dan	China (CHN)	1:36:18	
37	Natalie Saville	Australia (AUS)	1:36:32	
38	Graciela Mendoza	Mexico (MEX)	1:36:40	
39	Brigita Virbalytė	Lithuania (LTU)	1:36:52	
40	Veronica Budileanu	Romania (ROU)	1:36:57	
41	Yelena Miroshnychenko	Ukraine (UKR)	1:37:01	
42	Song Xiaoling	China (CHN)	1:37:14	
43	Jolanta Dukure	Latvia (LAT)	1:37:39	
44	Johana Ordóñez	Ecuador (ECU)	1:37:54	
45	Jo Jackson	Great Britain (GBR)	1:37:56	
46	Federica Ferraro	Italy (ITA)	1:38:00	
47	Edina Füsti	Hungary (HUN)	1:38:28	
48	María del Rosario Sánchez	Mexico (MEX)	1:38:55	
49	Paulina Buziak	Poland (POL)	1:39:01	
50	Wang Shanshan	China (CHN)	1:39:11	
51	Marie Polli	Switzerland (SUI)	1:39:25	
52	Claudia Ortega	Mexico (MEX)	1:39:38	
53	Evelyn Núñez	Guatemala (GUA)	1:39:56	
54	Laura Polli	Switzerland (SUI)	1:40:16	
55	Svetlana Tolstaya	Kazakhstan (KAZ)	1:40:22	
56	Susan Armenta	United States (USA)	1:40:24	
57	Geovana Irusta	Bolivia (BOL)	1:40:39	
58	Anna Drabenya	Belarus (BLR)	1:40:52	
59	Anne-Gaëlle Retout	France (FRA)	1:41:01	
61	Sandra Mitrovic	France (FRA)	1:41:44	
62	Agnese Pastare	Latvia (LAT)	1:42:35	
63	Maria Czaková	Slovakia (SVK)	1:42:58	
64	Lucie Pelantová	Czech Republic (CZE)	1:43:03	
65	Andrea Kovács	Hungary (HUN)	1:43:32	
66	Maria Michta	United States (USA)	1:45:02	
67	Yelena Shevchuk	Ukraine (UKR)	1:45:15	
68	Jolene Moore	United States (USA)	1:45:32	
69	Maritza Guamán	Ecuador (ECU)	1:45:59	
70	Galina Kichigina	Kazakhstan (KAZ)	1:46:45	
71	María Esther Sánchez	Mexico (MEX)	1:47:08	
72	Modra Ignate	Latvia (LAT)	1:47:38	
73	Yadira Guamán	Ecuador (ECU)	1:48:12	
74	Rachel Lavallée	Canada (CAN)	1:48:52	
75	Stephanie Casey	United States (USA)	1:49:42	
76	Lucyna Chruściel	Poland (POL)	1:49:51	
77	Sandra Evaristo	Mexico (MEX)	1:50:03	
78	Christine Guinaudeau	France (FRA)	1:51:12	
79	Anna Teplyakova	Kazakhstan (KAZ)	1:53:06	
80	Hanaa Gad	Egypt (EGY)	1:54:45	
81	Milexis Sepúlveda	Puerto Rico (PUR)	1:59:16	
—	Snezhana Yurchenko	Belarus (BLR)	DQ	
—	Jeon Yong-Eun	South Korea (KOR)	DQ	
—	Anisya Kirdyapkina	Russia (RUS)	DQ	
—	Fatma Ormeci	Turkey (TUR)	DQ	
—	Nadiya Prokopuk	Ukraine (UKR)	DQ	
—	Samantha Cohen	United States (USA)	DQ	
—	Megan Szirom	Australia (AUS)	DNF	
—	Rita Turova	Belarus (BLR)	DNF	
—	Stéphanie Iund-Herledan	France (FRA)	DNF	
—	Déspina Zapounídou	Greece (GRE)	DNF	
—	Viktória Madarász	Hungary (HUN)	DNF	
—	Rossella Giordano	Italy (ITA)	DNF	
—	Gisella Orsini	Italy (ITA)	DNF	
—	Sylwia Korzeniowska	Poland (POL)	DNF	
—	Tatyana Shemyakina	Russia (RUS)	DNF	
—	Zuzana Malíková	Slovakia (SVK)	DNF	

==== Team (20km Women) ====
Place	Country	Points
1st place, gold medalist(s)	Russia	7 pts
2nd place, silver medalist(s)	Portugal	24 pts
3rd place, bronze medalist(s)	Spain	38 pts
4	Lithuania	61 pts
5	Australia	75 pts
6	Romania	79 pts
7	Italy	93 pts
8	Belarus	97 pts
9	Ukraine	124 pts
10	China	128 pts
11	Mexico	138 pts
12	Poland	154 pts
13	Latvia	177 pts
14	Ecuador	186 pts
15	United States	190 pts
16	France	198 pts
17	Kazakhstan	204 pts

=== Women's 10 km Junior ===
Place	Athlete	Nation	Time	Notes
1st place, gold medalist(s)	Tatyana Kalmykova	Russia (RUS)	42:44	
2nd place, silver medalist(s)	Irina Yumanova	Russia (RUS)	43:23	
3rd place, bronze medalist(s)	Elmira Alembekova	Russia (RUS)	44:39	
4	Anamaria Greceanu	Romania (ROU)	46:05	
5	Jess Rothwell	Australia (AUS)	46:44	
6	Zhou Kang	China (CHN)	47:10	
7	Adriana Turnea	Romania (ROU)	47:21	
8	Maria Rayo	Colombia (COL)	47:25	
9	Nadzeya Darazhuk	Belarus (BLR)	47:38	
10	Anlly Pineda	Colombia (COL)	47:44	
11	Erandi Uribe	Mexico (MEX)	47:49	
12	Panagióta Tsinopoúlou	Greece (GRE)	47:49	
13	Alexandra Gradinariu	Romania (ROU)	47:51	
14	Anna Chernenko	Ukraine (UKR)	47:56	
15	Ana Conceição	Portugal (POR)	48:11	
16	Gabriela Cornejo	Ecuador (ECU)	48:43	
17	Catarina Godinho	Portugal (POR)	48:49	
18	Raquel González	Spain (ESP)	49:03	
19	Berta Kriván	Hungary (HUN)	49:09	
20	Tatsiana Stsefanenka	Belarus (BLR)	49:14	
21	Adriana Ochoa	Mexico (MEX)	49:18	
22	Antonella Palmisano	Italy (ITA)	49:24	
23	Anita Kažemaka	Latvia (LAT)	49:29	
24	Yuliya Davydenko	Ukraine (UKR)	49:36	
25	Nicole Fagan	Australia (AUS)	49:37	
26	Regan Lambie	Australia (AUS)	49:38	
27	Eleonora Giorgi	Italy (ITA)	49:44	
28	Dulce Arrieta	Mexico (MEX)	49:48	
29	Anna Mielcarek	Poland (POL)	50:15	
30	Elefthería Zapadióti	Greece (GRE)	50:24	
31	Galyna Yakovchuk	Ukraine (UKR)	50:45	
32	Mara Misuraca	Italy (ITA)	50:54	
33	Katarzyna Golba	Poland (POL)	51:13	
34	Liga Brokere	Latvia (LAT)	51:30	
35	Laura Reynolds	Ireland (IRL)	51:36	
36	Wilane Cuebas	Puerto Rico (PUR)	51:38	
37	Sandra Krause	Germany (GER)	52:03	
38	Laurene Delon	France (FRA)	52:05	
39	Polina Repina	Kazakhstan (KAZ)	52:16	
40	Joanna Koszalko	Poland (POL)	52:23	
41	Alena Viarbila	Belarus (BLR)	52:24	
42	Marie Onno	France (FRA)	53:13	
43	Miranda Melville	United States (USA)	53:25	
44	Hebatalla Adel	Egypt (EGY)	53:38	
45	Sara Alonso	Spain (ESP)	53:40	
46	Donna Carolan	Ireland (IRL)	54:05	
47	Catherine Davis	United States (USA)	54:27	
48	Eszter Bajnai	Hungary (HUN)	54:45	
49	Jenna Monahan	United States (USA)	55:43	
50	Gehad Adel	Egypt (EGY)	56:03	
51	Ragle Raudsepp	Estonia (EST)	56:04	
52	Eszter Kiss	Hungary (HUN)	56:19	
53	Meeli Pällin	Estonia (EST)	56:23	
—	Claudia Cornejo	Bolivia (BOL)	DQ	
—	Christin Elss	Germany (GER)	DQ	
—	Pinar Karakan	Turkey (TUR)	DQ	

==== Team (10km Women Junior) ====
Place	Country	Points
1st place, gold medalist(s)	Russia	3 pts
2nd place, silver medalist(s)	Romania	11 pts
3rd place, bronze medalist(s)	Colombia	18 pts
4	Belarus	29 pts
5	Australia	30 pts
6	Portugal	32 pts
7	Mexico	32 pts
8	Ukraine	38 pts
9	Greece	42 pts
10	Italy	49 pts
11	Latvia	57 pts
12	Poland	62 pts
13	Spain	63 pts
14	Hungary	67 pts
15	France	80 pts
16	Ireland	81 pts
17	United States	90 pts
18	Egypt	94 pts
19	Estonia	104 pts

== Participation ==
The participation of 430 athletes (276 men/154 women) from 53 countries is reported.

- Argentina (1/-)
- Australia (8/7)
- Austria (2/-)
- Belarus (13/8)
- Bolivia (-/2)
- Brazil (6/2)
- Canada (-/1)
- Chile (1/-)
- China (10/4)
- Colombia (6/3)
- Costa Rica (1/-)
- Czech Republic (5/2)
- Ecuador (10/4)
- Egypt (3/3)
- El Salvador (3/-)
- Estonia (3/2)
- Finland (5/-)
- France (12/6)
- Germany (8/4)
- Greece (3/4)
- Guatemala (4/1)
- Hungary (9/6)
- India (5/-)
- Iran (1/-)
- Ireland (4/3)
- Italy (12/8)
- Kazakhstan (5/4)
- Latvia (4/5)
- Lithuania (7/4)
- Malaysia (1/-)
- Mexico (13/7)
- Moldova (1/-)
- Netherlands (2/-)
- Norway (4/-)
- Peru (1/-)
- Poland (9/7)
- Portugal (10/2)
- Puerto Rico (1/2)
- Romania (-/6)
- Russia (13/8)
- Serbia (4/-)
- Slovakia (3/2)
- Slovenia (1/-)
- South Korea (4/1)
- Spain (13/7)
- Sweden (5/1)
- Switzerland (3/2)
- Tajikistan (1/-)
- Tunisia (1/-)
- Turkey (6/2)
- Ukraine (13/7)
- United Kingdom (3/1)
- United States (13/8)
