= 2004 IAAF World Race Walking Cup =

- Organisers: IAAF
- Edition: 21st
- Date: May 1–2
- Host city: Naumburg, Sachsen-Anhalt, Germany
- Events: 5
- Participation: 424 athletes from 54 nations

The 2004 IAAF World Race Walking Cup was held on 1 and 2 May 2004 in the streets of Naumburg, Germany. Detailed reports on the event and an appraisal of the results was given for the IAAF.

Complete results were published.

== Medallists ==
| Event | Gold | | Silver | | Bronze | |
|---|---|---|---|---|---|---|
Men
| Men's 20 km walk | Jefferson Pérez; Ecuador | 1:18:42 | Robert Korzeniowski; POL | 1:19:02 | Nathan Deakes; AUS | 1:19:11 |
| Men's 50 km walk | Aleksey Voyevodin; Russia | 3:42:44 | Yu Chaohong; China | 3:43:47 | Yuriy Andronov; Russia | 3:46:49 |
| Men's 10 km walk (junior event) | Sun Chao; China | 40:38 | Eder Sánchez; Mexico | 41:01 | Benjamin Sánchez; Mexico | 41:19 |
Team (Men)
| Team (Men 20 km) | China | 18 pts | Ecuador | 35 pts | Italy | 35 pts |
| Team (Men 50 km) | Russia | 8 pts | China | 14 pts | Spain | 23 pts |
| Team (Men 10 km Junior) | Mexico | 9 pts | Russia | 11 pts | China | 13 pts |
Women
| Women's 20 km walk | Yelena Nikolayeva; Russia | 1:27:24 | Jiang Jing; China | 1:27:34 | María Vasco; Spain | 1:27:36 |
| Women's 10 km walk (junior event) | Vera Sokolova; Russia | 45:29 | Anna Bragina; Russia | 46:15 | Zhang Nan; China | 47:18 |
Team (Women)
| Team (Women 20 km) | China | 18 pts | Russia | 28 pts | Romania | 41 pts |
| Team (Women 10 km Junior) | Russia | 3 pts | Poland | 16 pts | Greece | 22 pts |

== Results ==
=== Men's 20 km ===
| Place | Athlete | Nation | Time | Notes |
|---|---|---|---|---|
| 1 | Jefferson Pérez | Ecuador (ECU) | 1:18:42 | SB |
| 2 | Robert Korzeniowski | Poland (POL) | 1:19:02 | SB |
| 3 | Nathan Deakes | Australia (AUS) | 1:19:11 | SB |
| 4 | Han Yucheng | China (CHN) | 1:19:58 | |
| 5 | Liu Yunfeng | China (CHN) | 1:20:06 | SB |
| 6 | Ivano Brugnetti | Italy (ITA) | 1:20:06 | |
| 7 | Viktor Burayev | Russia (RUS) | 1:20:14 | SB |
| 8 | Juan Manuel Molina | Spain (ESP) | 1:20:29 | SB |
| 9 | Xu Xingde | China (CHN) | 1:20:35 | SB |
| 10 | Ivan Trotski | Belarus (BLR) | 1:20:41 | SB |
| 11 | Vladimir Stankin | Russia (RUS) | 1:20:43 | |
| 12 | Rolando Saquipay | Ecuador (ECU) | 1:20:47 | PB |
| 13 | Alessandro Gandellini | Italy (ITA) | 1:21:06 | SB |
| 14 | Luke Adams | Australia (AUS) | 1:21:24 | SB |
| 15 | André Höhne | Germany (GER) | 1:21:27 | SB |
| 16 | Marco Giungi | Italy (ITA) | 1:21:43 | SB |
| 17 | João Vieira | Portugal (POR) | 1:21:45 | SB |
| 18 | José David Domínguez | Spain (ESP) | 1:21:45 | SB |
| 19 | Gabriel Ortiz | Mexico (MEX) | 1:21:50 | PB |
| 20 | Denis Langlois | France (FRA) | 1:21:57 | SB |
| 21 | Benjamin Kuciński | Poland (POL) | 1:22:04 | |
| 22 | Xavier Moreno | Ecuador (ECU) | 1:22:24 | |
| 23 | Lorenzo Civallero | Italy (ITA) | 1:22:26 | |
| 24 | José Alejandro Cambil | Spain (ESP) | 1:22:28 | |
| 25 | Zhu Hongjun | China (CHN) | 1:22:39 | |
| 26 | Kevin Eastler | United States (USA) | 1:22:51 | |
| 27 | Robert Heffernan | Ireland (IRL) | 1:22:58 | |
| 28 | Roman Magdziarczyk | Poland (POL) | 1:22:59 | |
| 29 | Maik Berger | Germany (GER) | 1:23:02 | |
| 30 | Jamie Costin | Ireland (IRL) | 1:23:08 | |
| 31 | Vladimir Parvatkin | Russia (RUS) | 1:23:16 | |
| 32 | David Márquez | Spain (ESP) | 1:23:23 | |
| 33 | Fausto Quinde | Ecuador (ECU) | 1:23:25 | |
| 34 | Gyula Dudás | Hungary (HUN) | 1:23:27 | |
| 35 | Fredy Hernández | Colombia (COL) | 1:23:35 | |
| 36 | Musa Aouanouk | Algeria (ALG) | 1:23:35 | |
| 37 | Sergey Chernov | Belarus (BLR) | 1:23:46 | |
| 38 | Luis Fernando López | Colombia (COL) | 1:24:00 | |
| 39 | Tim Seaman | United States (USA) | 1:24:21 | |
| 40 | Yohan Diniz | France (FRA) | 1:24:28 | |
| 41 | Hatem Ghoula | Tunisia (TUN) | 1:24:56 | |
| 42 | Augusto Cardoso | Portugal (POR) | 1:25:11 | |
| 43 | Miloš Bátovský | Slovakia (SVK) | 1:25:23 | |
| 44 | Liu Dashan | China (CHN) | 1:25:33 | |
| 45 | Jan Albrecht | Germany (GER) | 1:25:36 | |
| 46 | Curt Clausen | United States (USA) | 1:25:39 | |
| 47 | Daugvinas Zujus | Lithuania (LTU) | 1:25:55 | |
| 48 | Gustavo Restrepo | Colombia (COL) | 1:26:05 | |
| 49 | Grzegorz Sudoł | Poland (POL) | 1:26:12 | |
| 50 | John Nunn | United States (USA) | 1:26:19 | |
| 51 | Álvaro García | Mexico (MEX) | 1:26:25 | |
| 52 | Peter Korčok | Slovakia (SVK) | 1:26:31 | |
| 53 | Gintaras Andriuškevičius | Lithuania (LTU) | 1:26:44 | |
| 54 | Matej Tóth | Slovakia (SVK) | 1:26:59 | |
| 55 | Franck Delree | France (FRA) | 1:27:33 | |
| 56 | Mário dos Santos | Brazil (BRA) | 1:27:36 | |
| 57 | Artyom Valchenko | Ukraine (UKR) | 1:27:43 | |
| 58 | Linas Bubnelis | Lithuania (LTU) | 1:27:48 | |
| 59 | Diogo Martins | Portugal (POR) | 1:27:49 | |
| 60 | José Alfredo Pérez | Mexico (MEX) | 1:28:06 | |
| 61 | Dom King | Great Britain (GBR) | 1:28:12 | |
| 62 | Erik Tysse | Norway (NOR) | 1:28:15 | |
| 63 | Bruno Reis | Portugal (POR) | 1:28:25 | |
| 64 | Tim Berrett | Canada (CAN) | 1:28:34 | |
| 65 | Rafał Dys | Poland (POL) | 1:28:50 | |
| 66 | Recep Celik | Turkey (TUR) | 1:28:55 | |
| 67 | Jorge Ignacio Silva | Spain (ESP) | 1:28:57 | |
| 68 | André Katzinski | Germany (GER) | 1:29:06 | |
| 69 | Mohd Shahrul Haizy | Malaysia (MAS) | 1:29:11 | |
| 70 | Colin Griffin | Ireland (IRL) | 1:29:12 | |
| 71 | Waleed Al-Sabahi | Qatar (QAT) | 1:29:21 | |
| 72 | Andriy Kovenko | Ukraine (UKR) | 1:29:35 | |
| 73 | Andi Drake | Great Britain (GBR) | 1:29:40 | |
| 74 | Hervé Davaux | France (FRA) | 1:29:52 | |
| 75 | Jared Tallent | Australia (AUS) | 1:30:01 | |
| 76 | Park Chil-Seong | South Korea (KOR) | 1:30:05 | |
| 77 | Zoltán Czukor | Hungary (HUN) | 1:30:54 | |
| 78 | Darren Bown | Australia (AUS) | 1:31:01 | |
| 79 | Aleksandr Kuzmin | Belarus (BLR) | 1:31:07 | |
| 80 | Rezki Yahi | Algeria (ALG) | 1:31:43 | |
| 81 | Ondřej Kocúr | Slovakia (SVK) | 1:31:55 | |
| 82 | Philip Dunn | United States (USA) | 1:32:28 | |
| 83 | Péter Domján | Hungary (HUN) | 1:32:47 | |
| 84 | Anton Kučmín | Slovakia (SVK) | 1:32:49 | |
| 85 | Artis Ūdris | Latvia (LAT) | 1:32:55 | |
| 86 | Bruno Grandjean | Switzerland (SUI) | 1:33:19 | |
| 87 | Marc Mundell | South Africa (RSA) | 1:35:09 | |
| 88 | Levente Kapéri | Hungary (HUN) | 1:36:00 | |
| 89 | David Kidd | Ireland (IRL) | 1:36:10 | |
| 90 | Kaviraj Mardemootoo | Mauritius (MRI) | 1:36:42 | |
| 91 | Daniel Foudjem | Cameroon (CMR) | 1:36:44 | |
| 92 | Abdulkader Öz | Turkey (TUR) | 1:38:34 | |
| 93 | Frank Buytaert | Belgium (BEL) | 1:42:02 | |
| 94 | Mukhiddin Fakhritdinov | Tajikistan (TJK) | 1:42:20 | |
| 95 | Arnaud Woo Kai Song | Mauritius (MRI) | 1:42:57 | |
| 96 | Hichem Kihal | Algeria (ALG) | 1:43:40 | |
| 97 | Jérome Caprice | Mauritius (MRI) | 1:48:30 | |
| — | Mohamed Ameur | Algeria (ALG) | DQ | |
| — | Christophe Humé | Belgium (BEL) | DQ | |
| — | Andrés Chocho | Ecuador (ECU) | DQ | |
| — | Daniel King | Great Britain (GBR) | DQ | |
| — | Harold van Beek | Netherlands (NED) | DQ | |
| — | Costică Bălan | Romania (ROU) | DQ | |
| — | Ilya Markov | Russia (RUS) | DQ | |
| — | Fabio Ruzzier | Slovenia (SLO) | DQ | |
| — | Mohamed Amin Benfrid | Algeria (ALG) | DNF | |
| — | Andrey Makarov | Belarus (BLR) | DNF | |
| — | José Alessandro Bagio | Brazil (BRA) | DNF | |
| — | Avinesh Kumar | Fiji (FIJ) | DNF | |
| — | Jani Lehtinen | Finland (FIN) | DNF | |
| — | Eddy Riva | France (FRA) | DNF | |
| — | Michele Didoni | Italy (ITA) | DNF | |
| — | Mabrouk Mohamed | Qatar (QAT) | DNF | |
| — | Roman Rasskazov | Russia (RUS) | DNF | |
| — | Predrag Filipović | Serbia and Montenegro (SCG) | DNF | |

==== Team (20 km Men) ====
| Place | Country | Points |
|---|---|---|
| 1st place, gold medalist(s) | China | 18 pts |
| 2nd place, silver medalist(s) | Ecuador | 35 pts |
| 3rd place, bronze medalist(s) | Italy | 35 pts |
| 4 | Russia | 49 pts |
| 5 | Spain | 50 pts |
| 6 | Poland | 51 pts |
| 7 | Germany | 89 pts |
| 8 | Australia | 92 pts |
| 9 | United States | 111 pts |
| 10 | France | 115 pts |
| 11 | Portugal | 118 pts |
| 12 | Colombia | 121 pts |
| 13 | Belarus | 126 pts |
| 14 | Ireland | 127 pts |
| 15 | Mexico | 130 pts |
| 16 | Slovakia | 149 pts |
| 17 | Lithuania | 158 pts |
| 18 | Hungary | 194 pts |
| 19 | Algeria | 212 pts |
| 20 | Mauritius | 282 pts |

=== Men's 50 km ===
| Place | Athlete | Nation | Time | Notes |
|---|---|---|---|---|
| 1st place, gold medalist(s) | Aleksey Voyevodin | Russia (RUS) | 3:42:44 | SB |
| 2nd place, silver medalist(s) | Yu Chaohong | China (CHN) | 3:43:47 | |
| 3rd place, bronze medalist(s) | Yuriy Andronov | Russia (RUS) | 3:46:49 | SB |
| 4 | German Skurygin | Russia (RUS) | 3:49:28 | |
| 5 | Alatan Gadasu | China (CHN) | 3:49:54 | |
| 6 | Jesús Angel García | Spain (ESP) | 3:50:33 | |
| 7 | Cui Zhide | China (CHN) | 3:52:24 | |
| 8 | Santiago Pérez | Spain (ESP) | 3:52:58 | SB |
| 9 | Mario Avellaneda | Spain (ESP) | 3:53:22 | SB |
| 10 | Giovanni De Benedictis | Italy (ITA) | 3:54:25 | |
| 11 | Modris Liepinš | Latvia (LAT) | 3:54:52 | SB |
| 12 | Pedro Martins | Portugal (POR) | 3:55:29 | PB |
| 13 | Jorge Costa | Portugal (POR) | 3:55:31 | PB |
| 14 | Xing Shucai | China (CHN) | 3:55:33 | |
| 15 | Julio René Martínez | Guatemala (GUA) | 3:56:19 | SB |
| 16 | Trond Nymark | Norway (NOR) | 3:57:11 | SB |
| 17 | Kim Dong-Young | South Korea (KOR) | 3:58:00 | SB |
| 18 | Andrei Stepanchuk | Belarus (BLR) | 3:58:31 | PB |
| 19 | Zhao Chengliang | China (CHN) | 3:58:39 | |
| 20 | Fredrik Svensson | Sweden (SWE) | 3:58:45 | SB |
| 21 | Luis García | Guatemala (GUA) | 4:02:47 | |
| 22 | Diego Cafagna | Italy (ITA) | 4:04:54 | |
| 23 | Rafał Fedaczyński | Poland (POL) | 4:05:10 | |
| 24 | Kamil Kalka | Poland (POL) | 4:06:09 | |
| 25 | António Pereira | Portugal (POR) | 4:07:30 | |
| 26 | Duane Cousins | Australia (AUS) | 4:09:14 | |
| 28 | Miloš Holuša | Czech Republic (CZE) | 4:12:02 | |
| 29 | Enrico Lang | Italy (ITA) | 4:12:02 | |
| 30 | Nenad Filipović | Serbia and Montenegro (SCG) | 4:13:25 | |
| 31 | Chris Erickson | Australia (AUS) | 4:14:16 | |
| 32 | Birger Fält | Sweden (SWE) | 4:14:28 | |
| 33 | Attila Fülöp | Hungary (HUN) | 4:14:44 | |
| 34 | Bengt Bengtsson | Sweden (SWE) | 4:14:47 | |
| 35 | Eddy Roze | France (FRA) | 4:16:18 | |
| 36 | Pascal Servanty | France (FRA) | 4:17:54 | |
| 37 | Christoph Brauer | Germany (GER) | 4:19:33 | |
| 38 | Luís Gil | Portugal (POR) | 4:19:40 | |
| 39 | Mario Contreiras | Portugal (POR) | 4:21:02 | |
| 40 | Frank Bertei | Australia (AUS) | 4:21:22 | |
| 41 | Fabrice Ramon | France (FRA) | 4:22:19 | |
| 42 | Nicolas Perrier | Switzerland (SUI) | 4:25:32 | |
| 43 | Vjačeslavs Grigorjevs | Latvia (LAT) | 4:26:09 | |
| 44 | Francisco Pinardo | Spain (ESP) | 4:28:03 | |
| 45 | David Šnajdr | Czech Republic (CZE) | 4:28:28 | |
| 46 | Ulf-Peter Sjöholm | Sweden (SWE) | 4:30:24 | |
| 47 | Fabrice Poras | France (FRA) | 4:32:05 | |
| 48 | Cristián Bascuñán | Chile (CHI) | 4:32:53 | |
| 49 | Lee Dae-Ro | South Korea (KOR) | 4:33:16 | |
| 50 | Róbert Tubak | Hungary (HUN) | 4:38:45 | |
| 51 | Alex Jara | Chile (CHI) | 4:41:18 | |
| 52 | Luis Villagra | Chile (CHI) | 4:49:03 | |
| 53 | Theron Kissinger | United States (USA) | 4:55:16 | |
| 54 | Dave McGovern | United States (USA) | 5:03:36 | |
| — | Liam Murphy | Australia (AUS) | DQ | |
| — | Sergey Ostapuk | Belarus (BLR) | DQ | |
| — | Jiří Malysa | Czech Republic (CZE) | DQ | |
| — | Denis Trautmann | Germany (GER) | DQ | |
| — | Aigars Fadejevs | Latvia (LAT) | DQ | |
| — | Yuris Koniševs | Latvia (LAT) | DQ | |
| — | Anatolijus Launikonis | Lithuania (LTU) | DQ | |
| — | Craig Barrett | New Zealand (NZL) | DQ | |
| — | Maciej Rosiewicz | Poland (POL) | DQ | |
| — | Marek Janek | Slovakia (SVK) | DQ | |
| — | Kazimír Verkin | Slovakia (SVK) | DQ | |
| — | Vadim Nigmatov | Tajikistan (TJK) | DQ | |
| — | Viktor Ginko | Belarus (BLR) | DNF | |
| — | Vitaliy Talankov | Belarus (BLR) | DNF | |
| — | Sergio Galdino | Brazil (BRA) | DNF | |
| — | Jacob Sørensen | Denmark (DEN) | DNF | |
| — | Mikel Odriozola | Spain (ESP) | DNF | |
| — | Denis Franke | Germany (GER) | DNF | |
| — | Mike Trautmann | Germany (GER) | DNF | |
| — | Spyridon Kastánis | Greece (GRE) | DNF | |
| — | Theódoros Stamatópoulos | Greece (GRE) | DNF | |
| — | János Tóth | Hungary (HUN) | DNF | |
| — | Sándor Urbanik | Hungary (HUN) | DNF | |
| — | Jeff Cassin | Ireland (IRL) | DNF | |
| — | Alex Schwazer | Italy (ITA) | DNF | |
| — | Sergey Korepanov | Kazakhstan (KAZ) | DNF | |
| — | Sin Il-Yong | South Korea (KOR) | DNF | |
| — | Rogelio Sánchez | Mexico (MEX) | DNF | |
| — | Rafał Augustyn | Poland (POL) | DNF | |
| — | José Ramírez | Puerto Rico (PUR) | DNF | |
| — | Ciprian Deac | Romania (ROU) | DNF | |
| — | Semyon Lovkin | Russia (RUS) | DNF | |
| — | Stepan Yudin | Russia (RUS) | DNF | |
| — | Andreas Gustafsson | Sweden (SWE) | DNF | |
| — | Yuriy Burban | Ukraine (UKR) | DNF | |
| — | Aleksey Shelest | Ukraine (UKR) | DNF | |
| — | Andrey Yurin | Ukraine (UKR) | DNF | |
| — | Sean Albert | United States (USA) | DNF | |
| — | Dave Doherty | United States (USA) | DNF | |
| — | Gary Morgan | United States (USA) | DNF | |

==== Team (50 km Men) ====
| Place | Country | Points |
|---|---|---|
| 1st place, gold medalist(s) | Russia | 8 pts |
| 2nd place, silver medalist(s) | China | 14 pts |
| 3rd place, bronze medalist(s) | Spain | 23 pts |
| 4 | Portugal | 50 pts |
| 5 | Italy | 61 pts |
| 6 | Latvia | 81 pts |
| 7 | Sweden | 86 pts |
| 8 | Australia | 97 pts |
| 9 | France | 112 pts |
| 10 | Chile | 151 pts |

=== Men's 10 km (Junior) ===
| Place | Athlete | Nation | Time | Notes |
|---|---|---|---|---|
| 1st place, gold medalist(s) | Sun Chao | China (CHN) | 40:38 | |
| 2nd place, silver medalist(s) | Eder Sánchez | Mexico (MEX) | 41:01 | |
| 3rd place, bronze medalist(s) | Benjamin Sánchez | Spain (ESP) | 41:19 | |
| 4 | Carsten Schmidt | Germany (GER) | 41:40 | |
| 5 | Aleksandr Prokhorov | Russia (RUS) | 41:47 | |
| 6 | Andrey Ruzavin | Russia (RUS) | 41:53 | |
| 7 | Alejandro Rojas | Mexico (MEX) | 42:03 | |
| 8 | Kim Hyun-Sup | South Korea (KOR) | 42:04 | |
| 9 | Adam Rutter | Australia (AUS) | 42:07 | |
| 10 | Michael Krause | Germany (GER) | 42:10 | |
| 11 | Doru Ursu | Romania (ROU) | 42:11 | |
| 12 | Shi Yong | China (CHN) | 42:21 | |
| 13 | Zhao Jianguo | China (CHN) | 42:51 | |
| 14 | Vilius Mikelionis | Lithuania (LTU) | 43:29 | |
| 15 | Ingus Janevics | Latvia (LAT) | 43:41 | |
| 16 | Jiří Chaloupka | Czech Republic (CZE) | 43:42 | |
| 17 | Michał Blažek | Slovakia (SVK) | 43:43 | |
| 18 | Marius Žiūkas | Lithuania (LTU) | 43:58 | |
| 19 | Iván Córdoba | Spain (ESP) | 44:06 | |
| 20 | Vadim Tsivanchuk | Belarus (BLR) | 44:11 | |
| 21 | Juan Carlos Ríos | Spain (ESP) | 44:27 | |
| 22 | Hannes Tonat | Germany (GER) | 44:38 | |
| 23 | Tadas Šuškevičius | Lithuania (LTU) | 44:52 | |
| 24 | Sergey Chkhan | Ukraine (UKR) | 44:54 | |
| 25 | Aleksandr Venglovskyy | Ukraine (UKR) | 44:57 | |
| 26 | Gonçalo Bejinha | Portugal (POR) | 45:11 | |
| 27 | Luke Finch | Great Britain (GBR) | 45:18 | |
| 28 | Anatole Ibáñez | Sweden (SWE) | 45:28 | |
| 29 | Michael McCagh | Australia (AUS) | 45:32 | |
| 30 | Marco Nicoletti | Italy (ITA) | 45:36 | |
| 31 | Marthinus Esterhuizen | South Africa (RSA) | 45:38 | |
| 32 | Pierre-Luc Ménard | Canada (CAN) | 46:04 | |
| 33 | Szabolcs Glázer | Hungary (HUN) | 46:07 | |
| 34 | Ioánnis Kafkás | Greece (GRE) | 46:12 | |
| 35 | Remy Chenu | France (FRA) | 46:22 | |
| 36 | James Rendón | Colombia (COL) | 46:23 | |
| 37 | Tibor Márta | Hungary (HUN) | 46:26 | |
| 38 | Eben Ezer Churqui | Bolivia (BOL) | 46:41 | |
| 39 | Aléxandros Papamihaíl | Greece (GRE) | 46:53 | |
| 40 | Aymeric Lacombe | France (FRA) | 47:05 | |
| 41 | Nicholas Ball | Great Britain (GBR) | 47:08 | |
| 42 | Damien Georges | France (FRA) | 47:44 | |
| 43 | Zakarya Soulimane | Algeria (ALG) | 47:49 | |
| 44 | Mirko Dolci | Italy (ITA) | 48:00 | |
| 45 | Saad Allali | Algeria (ALG) | 48:02 | |
| 46 | Benjamin Perske | Australia (AUS) | 48:41 | |
| 47 | Sergei Kutsenko | Estonia (EST) | 48:49 | |
| 48 | Zach Pollinger | United States (USA) | 49:06 | |
| 49 | Troy Clark | United States (USA) | 49:19 | |
| 50 | Olivier Colette | Belgium (BEL) | 49:24 | |
| 51 | Omar El Hak Beghdad | Algeria (ALG) | 49:36 | |
| 52 | Andreas Nielsen | Denmark (DEN) | 54:23 | |
| 53 | Bjørn Ove Ølness | Norway (NOR) | 56:01 | |
| 54 | Joseph Trapani | United States (USA) | 56:47 | |
| — | Osvaldo Ortega | Ecuador (ECU) | DQ | |
| — | Giorgio Rubino | Italy (ITA) | DQ | |
| — | David Mejía | Mexico (MEX) | DQ | |
| — | Mohamed Yousef Abdul Aziz | Qatar (QAT) | DQ | |
| — | Vladimir Kanaykin | Russia (RUS) | DQ | |
| — | Ivan Karcheuski | Belarus (BLR) | DNF | |
| — | Aleksandr Kazakov | Belarus (BLR) | DNF | |
| — | Casper Hansson | Denmark (DEN) | DNF | |
| — | Vladimir Savanović | Serbia and Montenegro (SCG) | DQ | |

==== Team (10 km Men Junior) ====
| Place | Country | Points |
|---|---|---|
| 1st place, gold medalist(s) | Mexico | 9 pts |
| 2nd place, silver medalist(s) | Russia | 11 pts |
| 3rd place, bronze medalist(s) | China | 13 pts |
| 4 | Germany | 14 pts |
| 5 | Spain | 22 pts |
| 6 | Lithuania | 32 pts |
| 7 | Australia | 38 pts |
| 8 | Ukraine | 49 pts |
| 9 | United Kingdom | 68 pts |
| 10 | Hungary | 70 pts |
| 11 | Greece | 73 pts |
| 12 | Italy | 74 pts |
| 13 | France | 75 pts |
| 14 | Algeria | 88 pts |
| 15 | United States | 97 pts |

=== Women's 20 km ===
| Place | Athlete | Nation | Time | Notes |
|---|---|---|---|---|
| 1st place, gold medalist(s) | Yelena Nikolayeva | Russia (RUS) | 1:27:24 | CR |
| 2nd place, silver medalist(s) | Jiang Jing | China (CHN) | 1:27:34 | PB |
| 3rd place, bronze medalist(s) | María Vasco | Spain (ESP) | 1:27:36 | NR |
| 4 | Jane Saville | Australia (AUS) | 1:27:44 | AR |
| 5 | Elisa Rigaudo | Italy (ITA) | 1:27:49 | PB |
| 6 | Song Hongjuan | China (CHN) | 1:27:51 | |
| 7 | Yuliya Voyevodina | Russia (RUS) | 1:27:53 | PB |
| 8 | Gillian O'Sullivan | Ireland (IRL) | 1:28:01 | SB |
| 9 | Melanie Seeger | Germany (GER) | 1:28:17 | NR |
| 10 | Wang Liping | China (CHN) | 1:29:12 | |
| 11 | Xu Aihui | China (CHN) | 1:29:30 | PB |
| 12 | Claudia Stef | Romania (ROM) | 1:29:40 | SB |
| 13 | Norica Câmpean | Romania (ROM) | 1:29:51 | SB |
| 14 | Athanasia Tsoumeleka | Greece (GRE) | 1:29:51 | SB |
| 15 | Sabine Zimmer | Germany (GER) | 1:29:56 | PB |
| 16 | Daniela Cârlan | Romania (ROM) | 1:30:19 | PB |
| 17 | Hristina Kokotou | Greece (GRE) | 1:30:20 | SB |
| 18 | Beatriz Pascual | Spain (ESP) | 1:30:22 | PB |
| 19 | Rossella Giordano | Italy (ITA) | 1:30:28 | SB |
| 20 | Tatyana Kozlova | Russia (RUS) | 1:30:31 | |
| 21 | Natalya Misyulya | Belarus (BLR) | 1:30:32 | |
| 22 | Vira Zozulya | Ukraine (UKR) | 1:30:33 | |
| 23 | Larisa Khmelnitskaya | Belarus (BLR) | 1:30:39 | |
| 24 | Sylwia Korzeniowska | Poland (POL) | 1:31:30 | |
| 25 | Natalie Saville | Australia (AUS) | 1:31:34 | |
| 26 | Cheryl Webb | Australia (AUS) | 1:31:43 | |
| 27 | Kristina Saltanovič | Lithuania (LTU) | 1:31:54 | |
| 28 | Shi Na | China (CHN) | 1:31:59 | |
| 29 | Maribel Gonçalves | Portugal (POR) | 1:32:02 | |
| 30 | Sonata Milušauskaitė | Lithuania (LTU) | 1:32:11 | |
| 31 | Mayte Gargallo | Spain (ESP) | 1:32:16 | |
| 32 | Gisella Orsini | Italy (ITA) | 1:32:19 | |
| 33 | María José Poves | Spain (ESP) | 1:32:32 | |
| 34 | Inês Henriques | Portugal (POR) | 1:32:32 | |
| 35 | Barbora Dibelková | Czech Republic (CZE) | 1:33:08 | |
| 36 | Vera Santos | Portugal (POR) | 1:33:13 | |
| 37 | Valentina Tsybulskaya | Belarus (BLR) | 1:33:51 | |
| 38 | Angelikí Makrí | Greece (GRE) | 1:34:14 | |
| 39 | Natalya Fedoskina | Russia (RUS) | 1:34:45 | |
| 40 | Veronica Budileanu | Romania (ROU) | 1:34:48 | |
| 41 | Yuan Yufang | Malaysia (MAS) | 1:35:09 | |
| 42 | Claire Woods | Australia (AUS) | 1:35:25 | |
| 43 | Nadiya Prokopuk | Ukraine (UKR) | 1:35:33 | |
| 44 | Kim Mi-Jeong | South Korea (KOR) | 1:35:38 | |
| 45 | Geovana Irusta | Bolivia (BOL) | 1:35:42 | |
| 46 | Marie Polli | Switzerland (SUI) | 1:35:47 | |
| 47 | Christine Guinaudeau | France (FRA) | 1:36:11 | |
| 48 | Evaggelía Xynoú | Greece (GRE) | 1:36:16 | |
| 49 | Teresita Collado | Guatemala (GUA) | 1:36:21 | |
| 50 | Yeliz Ay | Turkey (TUR) | 1:36:30 | |
| 51 | Gabrielle Gorst | New Zealand (NZL) | 1:36:41 | |
| 52 | Andrea Meloni | Germany (GER) | 1:36:42 | |
| 53 | Evelyn Núñez | Guatemala (GUA) | 1:36:55 | |
| 54 | Svetlana Tolstaya | Kazakhstan (KAZ) | 1:37:09 | |
| 55 | Ana Maria Groza | Romania (ROU) | 1:37:15 | |
| 56 | Ana Cabecinha | Portugal (POR) | 1:37:39 | |
| 57 | Patricia Garnier | France (FRA) | 1:37:49 | |
| 58 | Alessandra Picagevicz | Brazil (BRA) | 1:38:01 | |
| 59 | Nicolene Cronje | South Africa (RSA) | 1:38:40 | |
| 60 | Ildikó Ilyés | Hungary (HUN) | 1:39:14 | |
| 61 | Mária Gáliková | Slovakia (SVK) | 1:40:19 | |
| 62 | Gianetti Bonfim | Brazil (BRA) | 1:41:07 | |
| 63 | Bahia Boussad | Algeria (ALG) | 1:41:08 | |
| 64 | Fabienne Chanfreau | France (FRA) | 1:41:31 | |
| 65 | Deb Huberty | United States (USA) | 1:41:59 | |
| 66 | Geetha Nandani | Sri Lanka (SRI) | 1:42:15 | |
| 67 | Natalya Karpetchenko | Kazakhstan (KAZ) | 1:42:30 | |
| 68 | Cisiane Lopes BRA | 1:42:33 | | |
| 69 | Neringa Aidietytė | Lithuania (LTU) | 1:42:42 | |
| 70 | Ulrike Sischka | Germany (GER) | 1:42:50 | |
| 71 | Samantha Cohen | United States (USA) | 1:43:54 | |
| 72 | Jekaterina Jutkina | Estonia (EST) | 1:43:54 | |
| 73 | Dounia Kara-Hassoun | Algeria (ALG) | 1:44:06 | |
| 74 | Marie Yolene Raffin | Mauritius (MRI) | 1:44:15 | |
| 75 | Laura Polli | Switzerland (SUI) | 1:44:39 | |
| 76 | Margaret Ditchburn | United States (USA) | 1:44:53 | |
| 77 | Susan Armenta | United States (USA) | 1:45:38 | |
| 78 | Ghania Amzal | Algeria (ALG) | 1:45:40 | |
| — | Simone Wolowiec | Australia (AUS) | DQ | |
| — | Yelena Ginko | Belarus (BLR) | DQ | |
| — | Kathrin Born-Boyde | Germany (GER) | DQ | |
| — | Graciela Mendoza | Mexico (MEX) | DQ | |
| — | Tatyana Gudkova | Russia (RUS) | DQ | |
| — | Monica Svensson | Sweden (SWE) | DQ | |
| — | Nina Moskvina | Ukraine (UKR) | DQ | |
| — | Jolene Moore | United States (USA) | DQ | |
| — | Rita Turova | Belarus (BLR) | DNF | |
| — | Sandra Zapata | Colombia (COL) | DNF | |
| — | Monika Choderová | Czech Republic (CZE) | DNF | |
| — | Eva Pérez | Spain (ESP) | DNF | |
| — | Outi Sillanpää | Finland (FIN) | DNF | |
| — | Tatiana Denize | France (FRA) | DNF | |
| — | Fatiha Ouali | France (FRA) | DNF | |
| — | Athiná Papagianni | Greece (GRE) | DNF | |
| — | Erica Alfridi | Italy (ITA) | DNF | |
| — | Yelena Kuznetsova | Kazakhstan (KAZ) | DNF | |
| — | Zuzana Malíková | Slovakia (SVK) | DNF | |

==== Team (20km Women) ====
| Place | Country | Points |
|---|---|---|
| 1st place, gold medalist(s) | China | 18 pts |
| 2nd place, silver medalist(s) | Russia | 28 pts |
| 3rd place, bronze medalist(s) | Romania | 41 pts |
| 4 | Spain | 52 pts |
| 5 | Australia | 55 pts |
| 6 | Italy | 56 pts |
| 7 | Greece | 69 pts |
| 8 | Germany | 76 pts |
| 9 | Belarus | 81 pts |
| 10 | Portugal | 99 pts |
| 11 | Lithuania | 126 pts |
| 12 | France | 168 pts |
| 13 | Brazil | 188 pts |
| 14 | United States | 212 pts |
| 15 | Algeria | 214 pts |

=== Women's 10 km Junior ===
| Place | Athlete | Nation | Time | Notes |
|---|---|---|---|---|
| 1st place, gold medalist(s) | Vera Sokolova | Russia (RUS) | 45:29 | |
| 2nd place, silver medalist(s) | Anna Bragina | Russia (RUS) | 46:15 | |
| 3rd place, bronze medalist(s) | Zhang Nan | China (CHN) | 47:18 | |
| 4 | Maja Landmann | Germany (GER) | 48:39 | |
| 5 | Déspina Zapounídou | Greece (GRE) | 49:00 | |
| 6 | Agnieszka Dygacz | Poland (POL) | 49:15 | |
| 7 | Anastasiya Kuznyetsova | Ukraine (UKR) | 49:21 | |
| 8 | Lisa Grant | Australia (AUS) | 49:25 | |
| 9 | Yelena Rusak | Belarus (BLR) | 49:34 | |
| 10 | Beata Bodzioch | Poland (POL) | 49:47 | |
| 11 | Johana Ordóñez | Ecuador (ECU) | 50:12 | |
| 12 | Katie Stones | Great Britain (GBR) | 50:29 | |
| 13 | Brigita Virbalytė | Lithuania (LTU) | 50:41 | |
| 14 | Luz Villamarín | Colombia (COL) | 51:19 | |
| 15 | Natallia Charnahayeva | Belarus (BLR) | 51:26 | |
| 16 | Fiona Alldis | Australia (AUS) | 51:29 | |
| 17 | Alexía Triadafíllou | Greece (GRE) | 51:40 | |
| 18 | Amanda Gorst | New Zealand (NZL) | 51:42 | |
| 19 | Nina Kovalchuk | Ukraine (UKR) | 51:48 | |
| 20 | Eva María Iglesias | Spain (ESP) | 51:50 | |
| 21 | Katalin Varró | Hungary (HUN) | 51:54 | |
| 22 | Agnese Ragonesi | Italy (ITA) | 52:08 | |
| 23 | Oana Maxim | Romania (ROU) | 52:12 | |
| 24 | Tatiana González | Mexico (MEX) | 52:15 | |
| 25 | Mariana Marazopoúlou | Greece (GRE) | 52:19 | |
| 26 | Mandy Loriou | France (FRA) | 52:22 | |
| 27 | Sophie Hales | Great Britain (GBR) | 52:29 | |
| 28 | Nastassia Makatrova | Belarus (BLR) | 52:31 | |
| 29 | Maria Michta | United States (USA) | 53:04 | |
| 30 | Eszter Gerendási | Hungary (HUN) | 53:06 | |
| 31 | Georgina Delgado | Spain (ESP) | 53:15 | |
| 32 | Tatiana Orellana | Ecuador (ECU) | 53:26 | |
| 33 | Jessica Heazlewood | Australia (AUS) | 53:43 | |
| 34 | Lim Hyun-Soon | South Korea (KOR) | 53:46 | |
| 35 | Nerea Costal | Spain (ESP) | 53:47 | |
| 36 | Fatima Rodrigues | Portugal (POR) | 53:56 | |
| 37 | Caitriona McMahon | Ireland (IRL) | 54:12 | |
| 38 | Jennifer Gagg | Great Britain (GBR) | 54:14 | |
| 39 | Erica Elaine Adams | United States (USA) | 54:59 | |
| 40 | Catherine Hayes | United States (USA) | 55:32 | |
| 41 | Svetlana Gribkova | Estonia (EST) | 56:33 | |
| 42 | Dione Castellanos | Mexico (MEX) | 56:42 | |
| 43 | He Xingtong | China (CHN) | 57:05 | |
| 44 | Marlène Marc | France (FRA) | 57:14 | |
| 45 | Katharina Gruber | Germany (GER) | 57:31 | |
| 46 | Hendrika Botha | South Africa (RSA) | 58:02 | |
| 47 | Tania Anchondo | Mexico (MEX) | 58:16 | |
| 48 | Touria Daya | France (FRA) | 58:16 | |
| 49 | Maarja Rand | Estonia (EST) | 62:17 | |
| 50 | Kadri Pulst | Estonia (EST) | 63:34 | |
| — | Liu Xiaoyan | China (CHN) | DQ | |
| — | Yadira Guamán | Ecuador (ECU) | DQ | |
| — | Svetlana Vasilyeva | Russia (RUS) | DQ | |

==== Team (10km Women Junior) ====
| Place | Country | Points |
|---|---|---|
| 1st place, gold medalist(s) | Russia | 3 pts |
| 2nd place, silver medalist(s) | Poland | 16 pts |
| 3rd place, bronze medalist(s) | Greece | 22 pts |
| 4 | Australia | 24 pts |
| 5 | Belarus | 24 pts |
| 6 | Ukraine | 26 pts |
| 7 | United Kingdom | 39 pts |
| 8 | Ecuador | 43 pts |
| 9 | China | 46 pts |
| 10 | Germany | 49 pts |
| 11 | Spain | 51 pts |
| 12 | Hungary | 51 pts |
| 13 | Mexico | 66 pts |
| 14 | United States | 68 pts |
| 15 | France | 70 pts |
| 16 | Estonia | 90 pts |

== Participation ==
The participation of 424 athletes (272 men/152 women) from 54 countries is reported.

- Algeria (8/3)
- Australia (11/8)
- Belarus (11/8)
- Belgium (3/-)
- Bolivia (1/1)
- Brazil (3/3)
- Cameroon (1/-)
- Canada (2/-)
- Chile (3/-)
- China (13/8)
- Colombia (4/2)
- Czech Republic (4/2)
- Denmark (3/-)
- Ecuador (6/3)
- Estonia (1/4)
- Fiji (1/-)
- Finland (1/1)
- France (12/8)
- Germany (11/7)
- Greece (4/8)
- Guatemala (2/2)
- Hungary (10/3)
- Ireland (5/2)
- Italy (12/5)
- Kazakhstan (1/3)
- Latvia (6/-)
- Lithuania (7/4)
- Malaysia (1/1)
- Mauritius (3/1)
- Mexico (7/4)
- Netherlands (1/-)
- New Zealand (1/2)
- Norway (3/-)
- Poland (9/3)
- Portugal (10/5)
- Puerto Rico (1/-)
- Qatar (3/-)
- Romania (3/6)
- Russia (13/8)
- Serbia and Montenegro (3/-)
- Slovakia (8/2)
- Slovenia (1/-)
- South Africa (2/2)
- South Korea (5/2)
- Spain (13/8)
- Sri Lanka (-/1)
- Sweden (6/1)
- Switzerland (2/2)
- Tajikistan (2/-)
- Tunisia (1/-)
- Turkey (2/1)
- Ukraine (7/5)
- United Kingdom (5/3)
- United States (13/8)
