= 2004 World Junior Championships in Athletics – Men's 10,000 metres walk =

The men's 10,000 metres walk event at the 2004 World Junior Championships in Athletics was held in Grosseto, Italy, at Stadio Olimpico Carlo Zecchini on 17 July.

== Medalists ==
Gold	Andrey Ruzavin; Russia
Silver	Vladimir Kanaykin; Russia
Bronze	Kim Hyun-Sup; South Korea

== Results ==
=== Final ===
17 July

Rank	Name	Nationality	Time	Notes
1st place, gold medalist(s)	Andrey Ruzavin	Russia	40:58.15	
2nd place, silver medalist(s)	Vladimir Kanaykin	Russia	40:58.48	
3rd place, bronze medalist(s)	Kim Hyun-Sup	South Korea	40:59.24	
4	Eder Sánchez	Mexico	41:01.64	
5	Alejandro Rojas	Mexico	41:14.24	
6	Kōichirō Morioka	Japan	41:14.61	
7	Osvaldo Ortega	Ecuador	41:19.79	
8	Benjamin Sánchez	Spain	41:21.13	
9	Vadim Tsivanchuk	Belarus	41:40.11	
10	Giorgio Rubino	Italy	42:00.63	
11	Sun Chao	China	42:04.91	
12	Michael Krause	Germany	42:05.01	
13	Shi Yong	China	42:12.75	
14	Jiří Chaloupka	Czech Republic	42:15.90	
15	Ingus Janevics	Latvia	42:22.06	
16	Vilius Mikelionis	Lithuania	43:04.10	
17	Yusuke Suzuki	Japan	43:43.26	
18	Doru Ursu	Romania	43:49.46	
19	Mirko Dolci	Italy	44:14.45	
20	Vladimir Savanovic	Serbia and Montenegro	44:33.02	
21	Herbert de Almeida	Brazil	44:39.83	
22	Marius Žiūkas	Lithuania	44:44.91	
23	Carlos Borgoño	Chile	44:57.13	
24	Vanderlei dos Santos	Brazil	45:21.91	
25	Anatole Ibáñez	Sweden	45:35.23	
26	Eben Ezer Churqui	Bolivia	45:40.14	
27	Juan Carlos Ríos	Spain	46:09.12	
28	Yerko Araya	Chile	48:20.94	
	Adam Rutter	Australia	DQ	IAAF rule 230.4b
	Michal Blazek	Slovakia	DQ	IAAF rule 230.4b
	Carsten Schmidt	Germany	DNF	

== Participation ==
According to an unofficial count, 31 athletes from 21 countries participated in the event.

- Australia (1)
- Belarus (1)
- Bolivia (1)
- Brazil (2)
- Chile (2)
- China (2)
- Czech Republic (1)
- Ecuador (1)
- Germany (2)
- Italy (2)
- Japan (2)
- Latvia (1)
- Lithuania (2)
- Mexico (2)
- Romania (1)
- Russia (2)
- Serbia and Montenegro (1)
- Slovakia (1)
- South Korea (1)
- Spain (2)
- Sweden (1)
