= José Alessandro Bagio =

Brazilian race walker

Personal information
- Full name: José Alessandro Bernardo Bagio
- Nationality: Brazil
- Born: 16 April 1981 (age 45) Orleans, Santa Catarina, Brazil
- Height: 1.80 m (5 ft 11 in)
- Weight: 65 kg (143 lb)

Sport
- Sport: Athletics
- Event: Race walking
- Club: FM Timbó

Achievements and titles
- Personal best: 20 km walk: 1:21:43 (2008)
Medal record
Men's athletics
Representing Brazil
Ibero-American Championships
Gold medal – first place	2008 Iquique	20,000 m walk
Silver medal – second place	2004 Huelva	20,000 m walk
- Updated on 21 May 2014

José Alessandro Bernardo Bagio (born 16 April 1981) is a Brazilian race walker. He won the gold medal for the 20,000 metres walk at the 2008 Ibero-American Championships in Iquique, Chile, with a time of 1:23:12.6.

Bagio made his official debut for the 2004 Summer Olympics in Athens, where he placed fourteenth in the men's 20 km race walk, with a time of 1:23:33. At the 2008 Summer Olympics in Beijing, Bagio repeated his position from Athens in the same event, with a well-improved, seasonal best time of 1:21:43, finishing behind Spain's Benjamin Sánchez by five seconds.

On 31 March 2011, Bagio was tested positive for the steroid called 19-Norandrosterone, during a national race walking competition in Brazil, a year before. He served a two-year suspension by IAAF, making him ineligible to compete for the 2011 Pan American Games in Guadalajara, Mexico, and most importantly, for the 2012 Summer Olympics in London.

== Personal bests ==
=== Track walk ===
- 10,000 m: 39:32.0 min (ht) – Blumenau, Brazil, 31 August 2008
- 20,000 m: 1:21:37.9 hrs (ht) – Itajaí, Brazil, 15 May 2004

=== Road walk ===
- 20 km: 1:21:43 hrs – Beijing, China, 16 August 2008

== Achievements ==
Year	Competition	Venue	Position	Event	Notes
Representing the Brazil
1998	South American Junior Championships in Athletics	Córdoba, Argentina	4th	10,000m track walk	46:09.29
2000	South American Junior Championships	São Leopoldo, Brazil	2nd	10,000m track walk	43:42.47
2000	World Junior Championships	Santiago, Chile	7th	10,000m track walk	43:18.95
2001	South American Race Walking Championships/ Pan American Race Walking Cup	Cuenca, Ecuador	—	20 km	DQ
2002	South American Race Walking Championships	Puerto Saavedra, Chile	—	20 km	DQ
2002	Ibero-American Championships	Guatemala City, Guatemala	6th	20 km	1:28:18
2004	World Race Walking Cup	Naumburg, Germany	—	20 km	DNF
2004	Ibero-American Championships	Huelva, Spain	2nd	20,000m track walk	1:25:13.1
2004	Olympic Games	Athens, Greece	14th	20 km	1:23:33
2005	Pan American Race Walking Cup	Lima, Peru	16th	20 km	1:29:37
2005	Pan American Race Walking Cup	Lima, Peru	3rd	Team (20 km)	32 pts
2005	South American Championships	Cali, Colombia	—	20,000m track walk	DNF
2007	Pan American Race Walking Cup	Balneário Camboriú, Brazil	—	20 km	DNF
2007	Pan American Games	Rio de Janeiro, Brazil	8th	20 km	1:34:15
2007	South American Championships	São Paulo, Brazil	—	20,000m track walk	DNF
2008	South American Race Walking Championships	Cuenca, Ecuador	—	20 km	DNF
2008	World Race Walking Cup	Cheboksary, Russia	—	20 km	DNF
2008	Ibero-American Championships	Iquique, Chile	1st	20,000m track walk	1:23:12.60
2008	Olympic Games	Beijing, China	14th	20 km	1:21:43
2009	World Championships	Berlin, Germany	—	20 km	DNF
2014	South American Race Walking Championships	Cochabamba, Bolivia	8th	20 km	1:34:47
2014	World Race Walking Cup	Taicang, China	—	20 km	DNF
2015	Pan American Race Walking Cup	Arica, Chile	—	20 km	DNF
