= Athletics at the 2008 Summer Olympics – Men's 20 kilometres walk =

Men's 20 kilometres walk at the Games of the XXIX Olympiad
- Venue: Beijing Olympic Stadium
- Dates: August 16
- Competitors: 51 from 30 nations
- Winning time: 1:19:01

Medalists
1st place, gold medalist(s)		Valeriy Borchin	Russia
2nd place, silver medalist(s)		Jefferson Perez	Ecuador
3rd place, bronze medalist(s)		Jared Tallent	Australia

The men's 20 kilometres walk at the 2008 Summer Olympics took place on 16 August at the Beijing National Stadium.

The qualifying standards were 1:23:00 (A standard) and 1:24:30 (B standard).

== Records ==
Prior to this competition, the existing world and Olympic records were as follows:

World record	(Russia) Sergey Morozov (RUS)	1:16:43	Saransk, Russia	8 June 2008
Olympic record	Robert Korzeniowski (POL)	1:18:59	Sydney, Australia	22 September 2000

No new world or Olympic records were set for this event.

== Results ==
Rank	Athlete	Nationality	Time	Notes
1st place, gold medalist(s)	Valeriy Borchin	Russia	1:19:01	
2nd place, silver medalist(s)	Jefferson Pérez	Ecuador	1:19:15	SB
3rd place, bronze medalist(s)	Jared Tallent	Australia	1:19:42	
4	Wang Hao	China	1:19:47	PB
5	Ivano Brugnetti	Italy	1:19:51	SB
6	Luke Adams	Australia	1:19:57	
7	Paquillo Fernández	Spain	1:20:32	
8	Robert Heffernan	Ireland	1:20:36	
9	Luis Fernando López	Colombia	1:20:59	SB
10	Chu Yafei	China	1:21:17	
11	Yuki Yamazaki	Japan	1:21:18	SB
12	Juan Manuel Molina	Spain	1:21:25	
13	Benjamin Sánchez	Spain	1:21:38	
14	José Alessandro Bagio	Brazil	1:21:43	SB
15	Eder Sánchez	Mexico	1:21:53	
16	Koichiro Morioka	Japan	1:21:57	
17	Ilya Markov	Russia	1:22:02	
18	Giorgio Rubino	Italy	1:22:11	
19	David Kimutai	Kenya	1:22:21	SB
20	Rolando Saquipay	Ecuador	1:22:32	
21	Erik Tysse	Norway	1:22:43	
22	Ivan Trotski	Belarus	1:22:55	
23	Kim Hyun-Sub	South Korea	1:22:57	
24	Andriy Kovenko	Ukraine	1:22:59	
25	André Höhne	Germany	1:23:13	
26	Matej Tóth	Slovakia	1:23:17	
27	Hatem Ghoula	Tunisia	1:23:44	
28	Dzianis Simanovich	Belarus	1:23:53	
29	Rafał Augustyn	Poland	1:24:25	
30	Dong Jimin	China	1:24:34	
31	James Rendón	Colombia	1:24:41	
32	João Vieira	Portugal	1:25:05	
33	Park Chil-Sung	South Korea	1:25:07	
34	Hassanine Sebei	Tunisia	1:25:23	
35	Marius Žiukas	Lithuania	1:25:36	
36	David Mejia	Mexico	1:26:45	
37	Jean-Jacques Nkouloukidi	Italy	1:26:53	
38	Andrés Chocho	Ecuador	1:27:09	
39	Allan Segura	Costa Rica	1:27:10	
40	Juan Manuel Cano	Argentina	1:27:17	
41	Predrag Filipovic	Serbia	1:28:15	
42	Rustam Kuvatov	Kazakhstan	1:28:25	
43	Kevin Eastler	United States	1:28:44	
44	Siarhei Charnou	Belarus	1:29:38	
45	Sérgio Vieira	Portugal	1:29:51	
46	Jakub Jelonek	Poland	1:30:37	
47	Fedosei Ciumacenco	Moldova	1:31:37	
48	Mohamed Ameur	Algeria	1:32:21	
49	Recep Çelik	Turkey	1:32:54	
	Chris Erickson	Australia	DQ	
	Takayuki Tanii	Japan	DQ	

PB = Personal Best, SB = Season Best

=== Intermediates ===
Intermediate	Athlete	Country	Mark
4 km	1. Rustam Kuvatov	Kazakhstan	16:20
4 km	2. Paquillo Fernández	Spain	+0:03
4 km	3. Ivano Brugnetti	Italy	s.t.
4 km	4. Luke Adams	Australia	s.t.
4 km	5. Luis Fernando López	Colombia	s.t.
8 km	1. Ivano Brugnetti	Italy	32:38
8 km	2. Paquillo Fernández	Spain	+0:01
8 km	3. Luke Adams	Australia	s.t.
8 km	4. Yafei Chu	China	s.t.
8 km	5. Eder Sánchez	Mexico	s.t.
12 km	1. Ivano Brugnetti	Italy	48:36
12 km	2. Paquillo Fernández	Spain	s.t.
12 km	3. Luis Fernando López	Colombia	+0:01
12 km	4. Robert Heffernan	Ireland	s.t.
12 km	5. Jefferson Pérez	Ecuador	s.t.
16 km	1. Valeriy Borchin	Russia	1:04:05
16 km	2. Jefferson Pérez	Ecuador	s.t.
16 km	3. Jared Tallent	Australia	+0:02
16 km	4. Ivano Brugnetti	Italy	+0:03
16 km	5. Paquillo Fernández	Spain	+0:07

s.t. - same time.
