= David Mejia =

David Mejia may refer to:

- David Mejia (racewalker) (born 1986), Mexican race walker
- David Mejía (footballer) (born 2003), Peruvian footballer
- David Mejia (kickboxer) (born 1995), Spanish-Colombian kickboxer
