= Sun Chao =

Sun Chao may refer to:

- Sun Chao (fencer) (born 1983), female Chinese foil fencer
- Sun Chao (race walker) (born 1987), Chinese racewalker
- Sun Chao (badminton), Chinese badminton player
