= Zhao Jianguo =

Chinese race walker (born 1988)

Personal information
- Born: 19 January 1988 (age 38)
- Height: 1.75 m (5 ft 9 in)
- Weight: 55 kg (121 lb)

Sport
- Country: China
- Sport: Athletics
- Event: 50km Race Walk

Zhao Jianguo (Chinese: 赵建国, born 19 January 1988) is a Chinese race walker.

== Achievements ==
Year	Competition	Venue	Position	Event	Notes
2004	World Race Walking Cup	Naumburg, Germany	13th	10 km junior	
2008	World Race Walking Cup	Cheboksary, Russia	20th	50 km	
2012	2012 Summer Olympics	London, United Kingdom	37th	50 km	3:56:59

== See also ==
- China at the 2012 Summer Olympics - Athletics
  - Athletics at the 2012 Summer Olympics – Men's 50 kilometres walk
