= 2000 Asian Athletics Championships – Men's 20 kilometres walk =

The men's 20 kilometres walk event at the 2000 Asian Athletics Championships was held in Jakarta, Indonesia on 29 August.

== Results ==
Rank	Name	Nationality	Time	Notes
1st place, gold medalist(s)	Wu Ping	China	1:28:04	
2nd place, silver medalist(s)	Hironori Kawai	Japan	1:29:13	
3rd place, bronze medalist(s)	Lee Dae-Ro	South Korea	1:30:36	
4	Gurdev Singh	India	1:33:48	
5	Kristian Lumbang Tobing	Indonesia	1:35:57	
6	Rustem Kuvatov	Kazakhstan	1:39:10	
7	Mohd Sharulhaizy	Malaysia	1:39:16	
8	Sutrisno	Indonesia	1:42:22	
