= Sérgio Vieira (race walker) =

Portuguese racewalker

Sérgio Miguel Garcia Vieira (born 20 February 1976) is a Portuguese race walker. His twin brother, João Vieira, is also a race walker.

== Achievements ==
Year	Competition	Venue	Position	Event	Notes
Representing Portugal
1994	World Junior Championships	Lisbon, Portugal	22nd	10,000 m	43:50.07
1997	World Race Walking Cup	Poděbrady, Czech Republic	26th	20 km	1:20:58
1997	European U23 Championships	Turku, Finland	—	20 km	DNF
1999	World Race Walking Cup	Mézidon-Canon, France	41st	20 km	1:28:08
2006	World Race Walking Cup	A Coruña, Spain	45th	20 km	1:26:22
2007	World Championships	Osaka, Japan	—	20 km	DNF
2008	World Race Walking Cup	Cheboksary, Russia	18th	20 km	1:21:25
2008	Olympic Games	Beijing, China	45th	20 km	1:29:51
2009	European Race Walking Cup	Metz, France	—	20 km	DNF
2009	World Championships	Berlin, Germany	27th	20 km	1:24:32
2010	European Championships	Barcelona, Spain	20th	20 km	1:27:07
2010	World Race Walking Cup	Chihuahua, Mexico	25th	20 km	1:27:25
2011	European Race Walking Cup	Olhão, Portugal	—	20 km	DNF
2012	World Race Walking Cup	Saransk, Russia	—	20 km	DNF
2013	European Race Walking Cup	Dudince, Slovakia	29th	20 km	1:27:14
2013	World Championships	Moscow, Russia	40th	20 km	1:28:34
2014	World Race Walking Cup	Taicang, China	60th	20 km	1:24:13
2015	European Race Walking Cup	Murcia, Spain	—	20 km	DNF
2015	World Championships	Beijing, China	—	20 km	DNF
