= María José Poves =

Spanish race walker

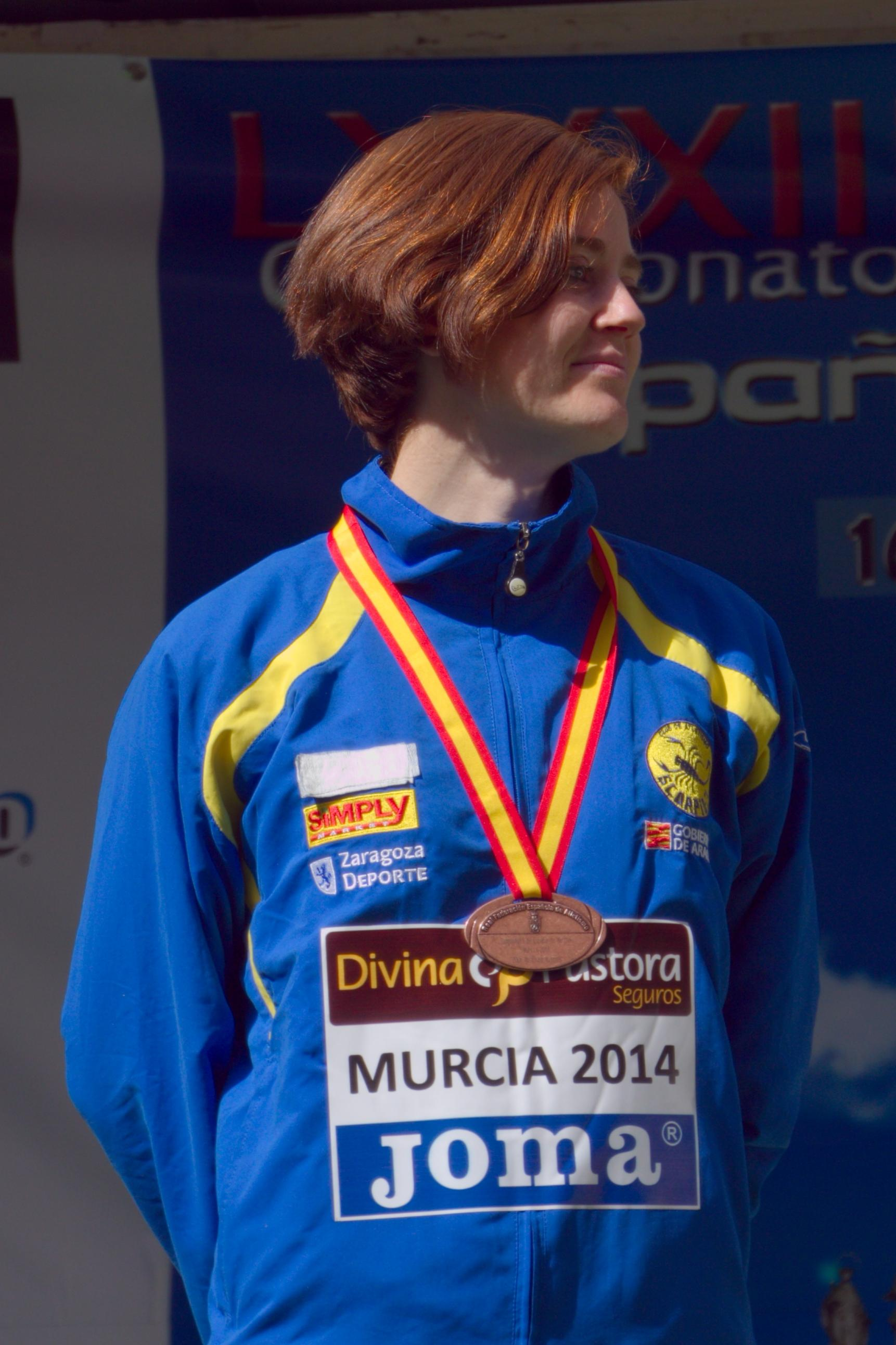
- Poves in 2014

Personal information
- Born: 16 March 1978 (age 48) Zaragoza, Spain
- Height: 1.68 m (5 ft 6 in)
- Weight: 52 kg (115 lb)

Sport
- Country: Spain
- Sport: Athletics
- Event: 20 km race walk

María José Poves Novella (born 16 March 1978) is a Spanish race walker.

== Achievements ==
Year	Competition	Venue	Position	Event	Notes
Representing Spain
2004	World Race Walking Cup	Naumburg, Germany	33rd	20 km	1:32:32
2005	World Championships	Helsinki, Finland	28th	20 km	1:36:12
2006	World Race Walking Cup	A Coruña, Spain	18th	20 km	1:32:05
2006	European Championships	Gothenburg, Sweden	19th	20 km	1:35:03
2007	World Championships	Osaka, Japan	12th	20 km	1:35:06
2008	World Race Walking Cup	Cheboksary, Russia	8th	20 km	1:29:31
2008	Olympic Games	Beijing, China	17th	20 km	1:30:52
2010	World Race Walking Cup	Chihuahua, Mexico	10th	20 km	1:35:38
2011	European Race Walking Cup	Olhão, Portugal	8th	20 km	1:32:36
2011	European Race Walking Cup	Olhão, Portugal	2nd	Team - 20 km	22 pts
2011	World Championships	Daegu, South Korea	–	20 km	DQ
2012	World Race Walking Cup	Saransk, Russia	3rd	20 km	1:29:10
2012	Olympic Games	London, United Kingdom	12th	20 km	1:29:36
2014	World Race Walking Cup	Taicang, China	15th	20 km	1:28:46
2015	European Race Walking Cup	Murcia, Spain	18th	20 km	1:31:16
2015	European Race Walking Cup	Murcia, Spain	5th	Team - 20 km	39 pts
2015	World Championships	Beijing, China	10th	20 km walk	1:31:06
