= Adam Rutter =

Australian racewalker

Adam Rutter (born 24 December 1986 in Sydney, Australia) is an Australian racewalker. He competed in the 50 km walk at the 2008 Summer Olympics and the 20 km walk at the 2012 Summer Olympics but did not finish either race.

He achieved the 2008 Olympic qualifying standard by splitting 3:52:49 in the 50 km walk at age 20, making him the youngest Australian man to qualify. "At the Olympics I was sick, so I didn't have the best prep", he said of his 2008 Olympic performance.

Rutter qualified for the 2009 World Championships in Athletics, where he competed in the 20 km walk. After 10 km, Rutter passed Eric Tysse to take the lead, walking negative splits ahead of Valery Borchin and Hao Wang. Rutter was described as "unheralded" and few predicted that he would be in the lead more than half-way through the race. "It's hard to put in words, it's what you sort of dream of", Rutter said. However, he was one of two athletes to have been disqualified based on his walking form. Rutter accepted but did not agree with the disqualification.

Rutter competed at the 2004, 2006, 2008, 2010, 2012, and 2014 IAAF World Race Walking Cup, with a best finish of 9th at the 2004 edition.

Rutter competed for the Sydney Pacific Athletics Club and set the under-14 1500 m walk record at age 12. He studied history and trained with Chris Erickson.
