= Eder Sánchez =

Mexican race walker

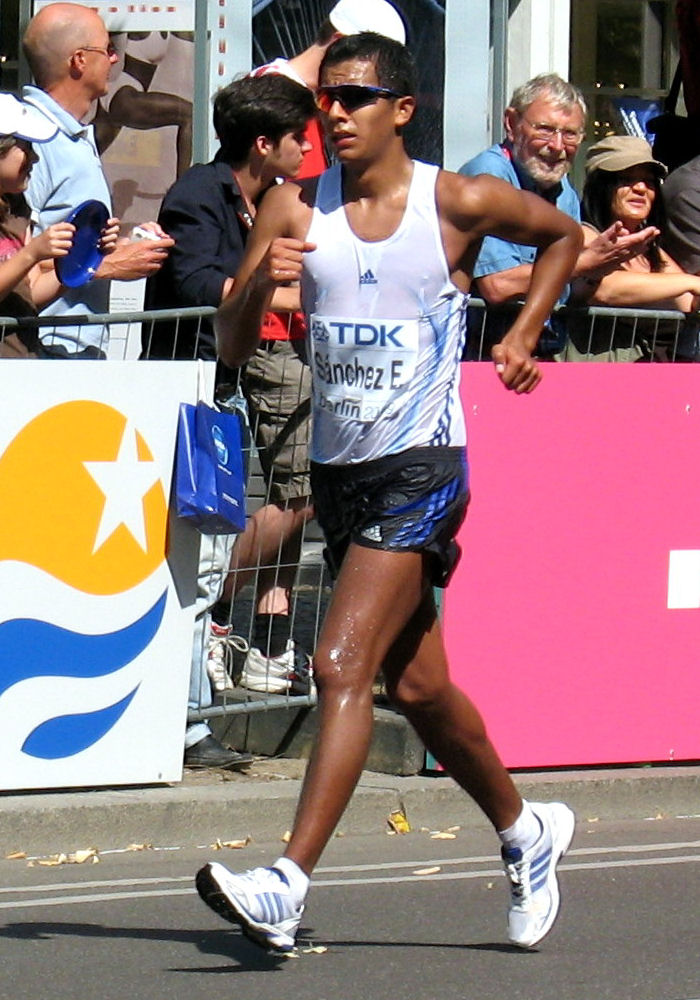
- Sánchez competing at the 2009 World Championships in Athletics

Personal information
- Full name: Eder Heraclio Sánchez Terán
- Born: 21 May 1986 (age 40) Tlalnepantla de Baz, Mexico
- Height: 1.76 m (5 ft 9 in)
- Weight: 66 kg (146 lb)

Sport
- Country: Mexico
- Sport: Athletics
- Event: 20km Race Walk
Medal record
Men's Race walking
Representing Mexico
World Championships
Bronze medal – third place	2009 Berlin	20 km
World Race Walking Cup
Bronze medal – third place	2008 Cheboksary	20 km

Heraclio Eder Sánchez Terán (born 21 May 1986) is a Mexican race walker. He has competed at the World Championships in Athletics five times (2005 to 2011) and represented his country at the 2008 Beijing Olympics and the 2012 London Olympics. He is currently serving the Mexican Army, and has won the Mexican 'Premio Nacional del Deporte'. He holds the Mexican record for walking over 5 km and 10 km. His best for the 20 km distance is 1:18:34 hours.

Sánchez was active in international walking competitions as a junior (under-20) athlete. He was the silver medallist over 10 km at the 2003 Pan American Junior Athletics Championships, was runner-up to Sun Chao at the 2004 IAAF World Race Walking Cup, then took the 10,000 m walk title at the 2004 CAC Junior Championships. He came fourth in the 10,000 m walk at the 2004 World Junior Championships in Athletics.

In 2005 he moved up to the senior 20 kilometres walk distance and placed eighth in that event at the 2005 World Championships in Athletics. He failed to finish at the 2006 IAAF World Race Walking Cup, but won a silver medal at the 2006 Central American and Caribbean Games behind Luis Fernando López. He improved his placing at the 2007 World Championships in Athletics with a fourth-place finish and reached his first global senior podium at the 2008 IAAF World Race Walking Cup, taking the bronze medal with a personal best time of 1:18:34 hours. He managed only 15th at the 2008 Summer Olympics later that year however. He did win a gold medal at the 2008 NACAC Under-23 Championships in Athletics that season though.

Sánchez was the bronze medallist at the 2009 World Championships in Athletics in a time of 1:19:22 hours. He came sixth in the 20 km walk at the 2010 IAAF World Race Walking Cup held in Mexico and won the regional title at the 2010 Central American and Caribbean Games in a games record time. The year after he came sixth at the 2011 Pan American Games and was 15th at the 2011 World Championships in Athletics.

He competed on the 2012 IAAF World Race Walking Challenge circuit and won at the Chihuahua meeting in his native Mexico in March. At the 2012 Summer Olympics, he finished in 6th place.

== Personal bests ==
Event	Result	Venue	Date
Road walk
10 km	38:31 min	(Russia) Saransk	19 Sep 2009
20 km	1:18:34 hrs	(Russia) Cheboksary	10 May 2008
50 km	3:53:19 hrs	(Slovakia) Dudince	26 Mar 2011
Track walk
5000 m	18:35.36 min	(Poland) Katowice	2 Jul 2014
10,000 m	39:46.83 min	Mexico City	26 Jun 2011

== Achievements ==
Year	Competition	Venue	Position	Event	Notes
Representing Mexico
2002	Central American and Caribbean Junior Championships (U-17)	Bridgetown, Barbados	1st	5000m track walk	21:24.33 CR
2003	World Youth Championships	Sherbrooke, Canada	—	10,000m track walk	DQ
2003	Pan American Junior Championships	Bridgetown, Barbados	2nd	10,000m track walk	46:27.41
2004	World Race Walking Cup (U20)	Naumburg, Germany	2nd	10 km	41:01
2004	World Race Walking Cup (U20)	Naumburg, Germany	1st	Team (10 km Junior)	9 pts
2004	Central American and Caribbean Junior Championships (U-20)	Coatzacoalcos, Mexico	1st	10,000m track walk	43:21.99
2004	World Junior Championships	Grosseto, Italy	4th	10,000m	41:01.64
2005	Pan American Race Walking Cup (U20)	Lima, Peru	—	10 km	DQ
2005	World Championships	Helsinki, Finland	8th	20 km	1:20:45
2006	World Race Walking Cup	A Coruña, Spain	—	20 km	DNF
2006	World Race Walking Cup	A Coruña, Spain	8th	Team (20 km)	94 pts
2006	Central American and Caribbean Games	Cartagena, Colombia	2nd	20 km	1:26:30
2007	Pan American Race Walking Cup	Balneário Camboriú, Brazil	5th	20 km	1:28:20
2007	Pan American Race Walking Cup	Balneário Camboriú, Brazil	2nd	Team (20 km)	23 pts
2007	World Championships	Osaka, Japan	4th	20 km	1:23:36
2008	World Race Walking Cup	Cheboksary, Russia	3rd	20 km	1:18:34
2008	World Race Walking Cup	Cheboksary, Russia	4th	Team (20 km)	61 pts
2008	NACAC U-23 Championships	Toluca, Mexico	1st	20,000m walk	1:30:46.78 A
2008	Olympic Games	Beijing, China	15th	20 km	1:21:53
2009	World Championships	Berlin, Germany	3rd	20 km	1:19:22
2010	World Race Walking Cup	Chihuahua, Mexico	7th	20 km	1:23:56
2010	World Race Walking Cup	Chihuahua, Mexico	3rd	Team (20 km)	41 pts
2010	Central American and Caribbean Games	Mayagüez, Puerto Rico	1st	20 km	1:22:32 GR
2011	World Championships	Daegu, South Korea	15th	20 km	1:23:05
2011	Pan American Games	Guadalajara, Mexico	6th	20 km	1:25:00
2012	World Race Walking Cup	Saransk, Russia	7th	20 km	1:20:58
2012	World Race Walking Cup	Saransk, Russia	7th	Team (20 km)	86 pts
2012	Olympic Games	London, United Kingdom	6th	20 km	1:19:52
2013	Pan American Race Walking Cup	Guatemala City, Guatemala	—	20 km	DQ
2015	Pan American Race Walking Cup	Arica, Chile	5th	20 km	1:21:58
2015	World Championships	Beijing, China	15th	20 km walk	1:21:56
