= John Nunn (race walker) =

American race walker

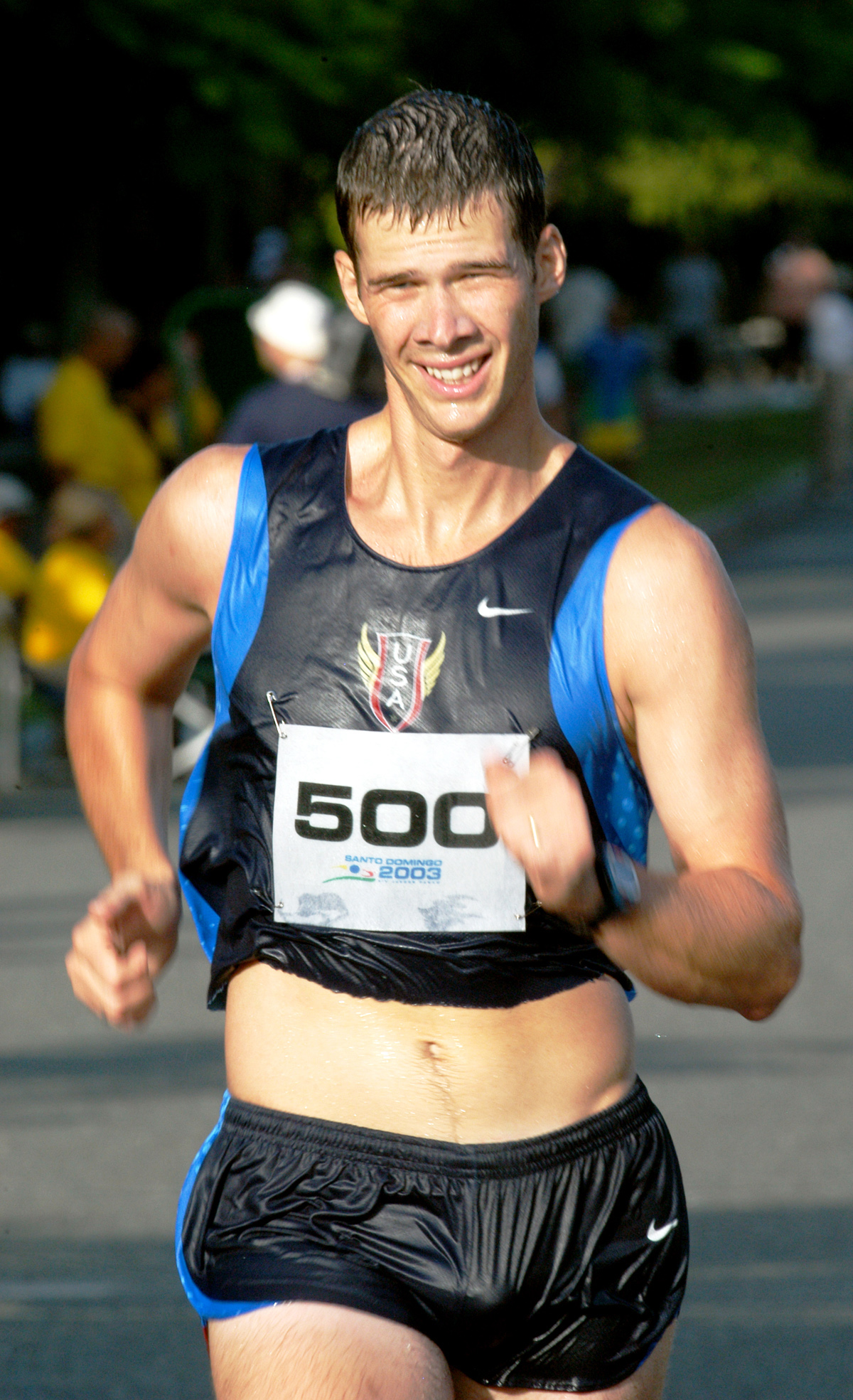
- Nunn at the 2003 Pan American Games

Personal information
- Born: February 3, 1978 (age 48) Durango, Colorado, U.S.
- Height: 1.88 m (6 ft 2 in)
- Weight: 78 kg (172 lb)

Sport
- Country: United States
- Sport: Race walking
- Club: U.S. Army WCAP
- Coached by: Enrique Pena

Achievements and titles
- Olympic finals: 2004, 2012
- Updated on May 16, 2015

John Hamilton Nunn (born February 3, 1978) is an American race walker. He competed at the 2004 Summer Olympics, finishing in 26th place in the men's 20 km event. On January 22, 2012, he qualified to represent the U.S. in the 2012 Summer Olympics in the 50km race walk. In the Olympics, Nunn finished in 42nd place in a personal best time of 4:03:28.

After competing in track and field and cross country running at William Henry Harrison High School in Evansville, Indiana, Nunn attended the University of Wisconsin-Parkside on a racewalking scholarship.

His personal bests are: 20 km walk 1:22:31, May 8, 2004, in Birštonas, Lithuania, and 5 km walk (indoors) 19:26.43 on March 2, 2003, in Boston at the USA Indoor Track and Field Championships.

Nunn is a member of the United States Army. While enlisted, Nunn served as a member of its World Class Athlete Program. Having since left the WCAP, Nunn trained as a physician's assistant and commissioned as an officer in the United States Army.

Nunn is a member of the Church of Jesus Christ of Latter-day Saints.

Being a professional baker, Nunn used a portion of his baking profits to bring his daughter Ella with him to the Olympics in London.

== Personal bests ==
Event	Result	Venue	Date
Road walk
20 km	1:22:31 hrs	Birštonas, Lithuania	May 8, 2004
50 km	4:03:21 hrs	San Diego, United States	February 21, 2016
Track walk
20,000 m	1:25:15.9 hrs	Palo Alto, United States	June 20, 2003

== Achievements ==
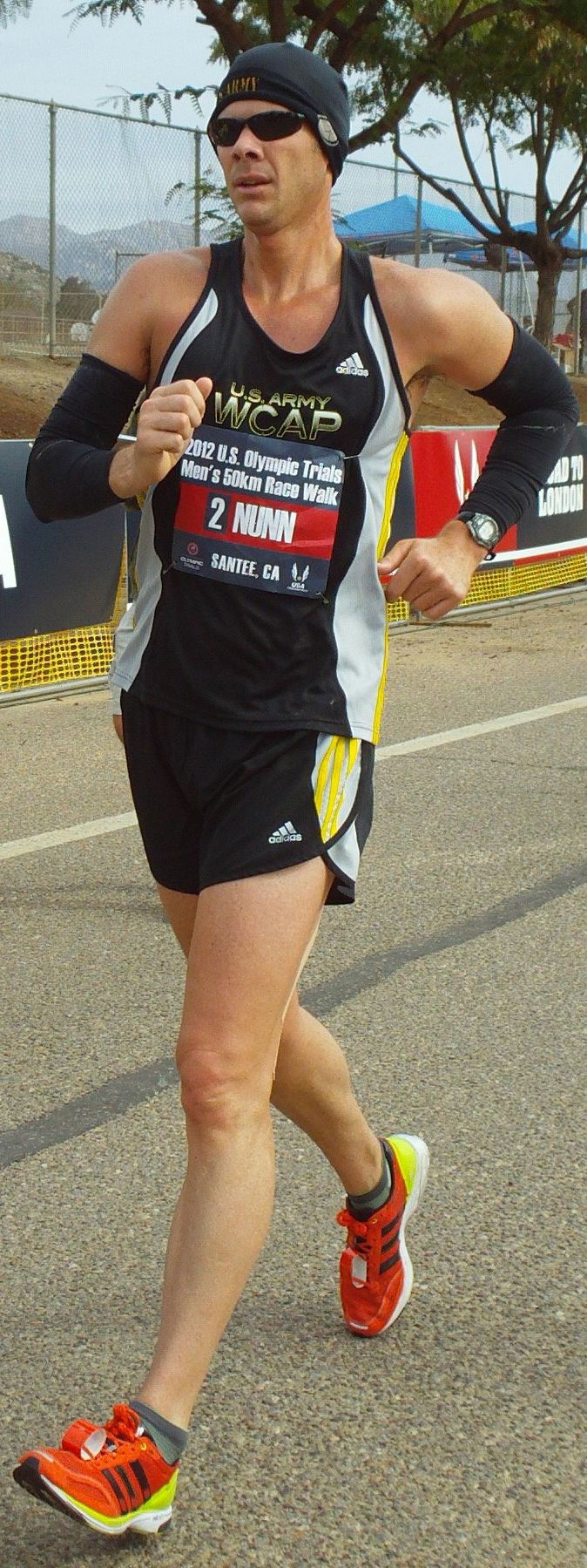
Nunn winning the 2012 Olympic Trials in Santee, California

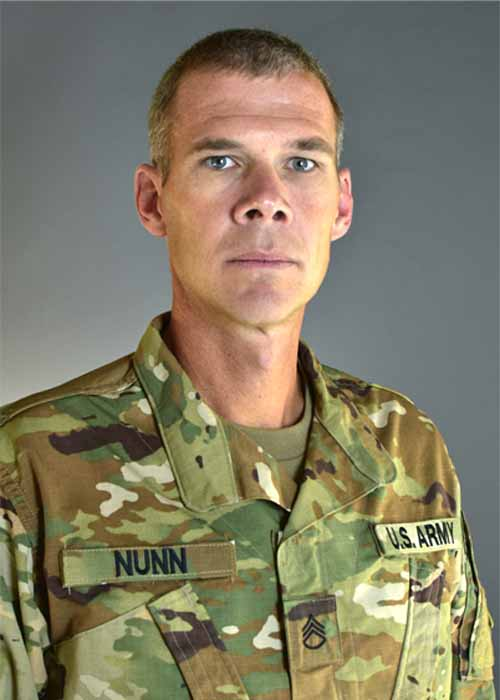
Nunn in 2017

Year	Competition	Venue	Position	Event	Notes
Representing the United States
1997	Pan American Junior Championships	Havana, Cuba	5th	10,000m	46:38.98
2000	NACAC U-25 Championships	Monterrey, Mexico	3rd	20,000m	1:45:37.35
2001	Pan American Race Walking Cup	Cuenca, Ecuador	8th	20 km	1:36:36
2001	Pan American Race Walking Cup	Cuenca, Ecuador	3rd	Team (20 km)	26 pts
2002	IAAF World Race Walking Cup	Turin, Italy	—	20 km	DNF
2002	IAAF World Race Walking Cup	Turin, Italy	12th	Team (20 km)	149 pts
2003	Pan American Race Walking Cup	Chula Vista, United States	17th	20 km	1:32:13
2003	Pan American Race Walking Cup	Chula Vista, United States	1st	Team (20 km)	13 pts
2003	Pan American Games	Santo Domingo, Dominican Republic	8th	20 km	1:35:34
2004	IAAF World Race Walking Cup	Naumburg, Germany	50th	20 km	1:26:19
2004	IAAF World Race Walking Cup	Naumburg, Germany	9th	Team (20 km)	111 pts
2004	Olympic Games	Athens, Greece	26th	20 km	1:27:38
2005	Pan American Race Walking Cup	Lima, Peru	16th	20 km	1:29:44
2005	Pan American Race Walking Cup	Lima, Peru	5th	Team (20 km)	49 pts
2005	World Championships	Helsinki, Finland	30th	20 km	1:27:10
2006	IAAF World Race Walking Cup	A Coruña, Spain	71st	20 km	1:31:49
2006	IAAF World Race Walking Cup	A Coruña, Spain	15th	Team (20 km)	163 pts
2007	Pan American Games	Rio de Janeiro, Brazil	7th	20 km	1:32.37
2007	Military World Games	Hyderabad, India	9th	20,000m	1:35:51
2008	IAAF World Race Walking Cup	Cheboksary, Russia	79th	20 km	1:31:47
2008	IAAF World Race Walking Cup	Cheboksary, Russia	19th	Team (20 km)	252 pts
2010	US National Championships	Des Moines, United States	1st	20,000m	1:29:21.60
2011	Pan American Race Walking Cup	Envigado, Colombia	11th	20 km	1:31:26
2011	Pan American Race Walking Cup	Envigado, Colombia	2nd	Team (20 km)	39 pts
2011	US National Championships	Eugene, United States	2nd	20,000m	1:23:51.73
2011	Pan American Games	Guadalajara, Mexico	8th	20 km	1:26:30 A
2012	Olympic Games	London, United Kingdom	43rd	50 km	4:03:28
2013	Pan American Race Walking Cup	Guatemala City, Guatemala	24th	20 km	1:36:33 A
2013	Pan American Race Walking Cup	Guatemala City, Guatemala	4th	Team (20 km)	67 pts
2013	World Championships	Moscow, Russia	46th	50 km	4:34:55
2015	Pan American Race Walking Cup	Arica, Chile	23rd	20 km	1:29:33
2015	Pan American Race Walking Cup	Arica, Chile	7th	Team (20 km)	75 pts
2015	World Championships	Beijing, China	37th	50 km	4:09:44
