= Lyudmila Arkhipova =

Russian race walker

Lyudmila Arkhipova (Russian: Людмила Архипова; born 12 September 1978) is a female race walker from Russia.

== Achievements ==
Year	Competition	Venue	Position	Notes
Representing Russia
2008	World Race Walking Cup	Cheboksary, Russia	4th	20 km
