= Monica Svensson =

Swedish racewalker

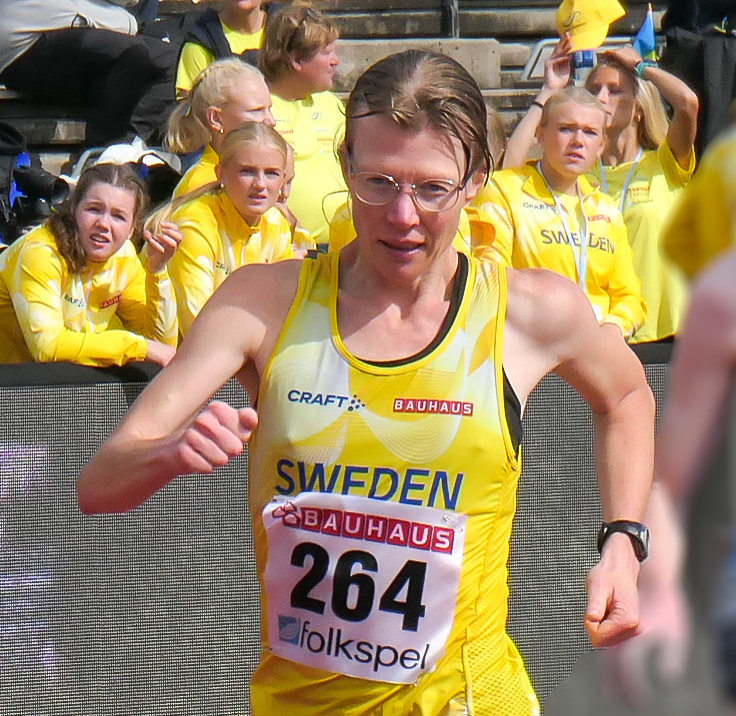
Monica Svensson

Monica Svensson (born December 26, 1978) is a retired race walker from Sweden. She represented her native country at the 2003 World Championships in Paris, France, where she ended up in 27th place in the women's 20 km walk event. She was credited with the world best time in 50 km walk before the event got official recognition.

== Achievements ==
Year	Competition	Venue	Position	Notes
Representing Sweden
1999	World Race Walking Cup	Mézidon-Canon	71st	20 km
2002	World Race Walking Cup	Turin	49th	20 km
2003	World Championships	Paris	27th	20 km
2004	World Race Walking Cup	Naumburg	—	DSQ
2005	World Championships	Helsinki	32nd	20 km
2006	World Race Walking Cup	A Coruña	—	DNF
2008	World Race Walking Cup	Cheboksary	33rd	20 km
2009	World Championships	Berlin	—	DSQ
