= Fedosei Ciumacenco =

Moldovan race walker

Personal information
- Born: 27 January 1973 (age 53) Bender, Soviet Union

Sport
- Sport: Race walking

Fedosei Ciumacenco (born 27 January 1973) is a Moldovan race walker.

He was born in Bender. He competed in the 20-kilometre walk at the Olympic Games in 1996, 2000, 2004 and 2008, and the World Championships in 1997, 1999 and 2003.

== Achievements ==
Year	Competition	Venue	Position	Notes
Representing Moldova
1996	Olympic Games	Atlanta, United States	41st	20 km
1997	World Championships	Athens, Greece	30th	20 km
1998	European Championships	Budapest, Hungary	19th	20 km
1999	World Championships	Seville, Spain	22nd	20 km
2000	Olympic Games	Sydney, Australia	DSQ	50 km
2001	European Race Walking Cup	Dudince, Slovakia	43rd	20 km
2003	World Championships	Paris, France	25th	20 km
2004	Olympic Games	Athens, Greece	34th	20 km
2008	Olympic Games	Beijing, China	47th	20 km
