= Jean-Jacques Nkouloukidi =

Italian race walker

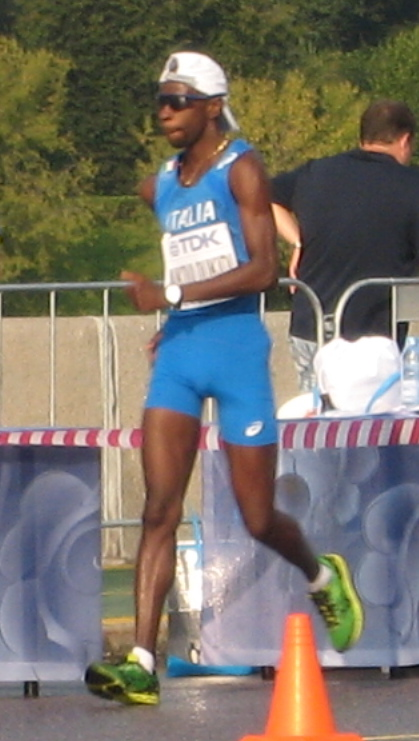
- Jean-Jacques Nkouloukidi in 2013

Personal information
- Nationality: Italian
- Born: 15 April 1982 (age 44) Rome, Italy
- Height: 1.70 m (5 ft 7 in)
- Weight: 58 kg (128 lb)

Sport
- Country: Italy
- Sport: Athletics
- Event: Racewalking
- Club: G.S. Fiamme Gialle

Achievements and titles
- Personal bests: 10 km: 39:50 (2007); 20 km: 1:21:45 (2008); 50 km: 3:52:35 (2011)
Medal record
Event	1st	2nd	3rd
European Race Walking Cup	2	1	1

Jean-Jacques Nkouloukidi (born 15 April 1982 in Rome) is a former Italian race walker.

== Biography ==
Born in Rome by Congolese father and Haitian mother grew up in Ostia practicing swimming and soccer. He participated at one edition of the Summer Olympics (2008), he has 7 caps in national team from 2005 to 2012.

== Achievements ==
Year	Competition	Venue	Position	Event	Notes
2001	European Junior Championships	Grosseto, Italy	13th	10,000 m	45:32.95
2007	European Race Walking Cup	Royal Leamington Spa, United Kingdom	39th	20 km	1:26:51
2007	European Race Walking Cup	Royal Leamington Spa, United Kingdom	2nd	Team - 20 km	32 pts
2008	World Race Walking Cup	Cheboksary, Russia	19th	20 km	1:21:45
2008	Olympic Games	Beijing, PR China	37th	20 km	1:26:53
2009	European Race Walking Cup	Metz, France	3rd	20 km	1:25:07
2009	European Race Walking Cup	Metz, France	1st	Team - 20 km	6 pts
2009	Universiade	Belgrade, Serbia	9th	20 km	1:24:13
2009	World Championships	Berlin, Germany	21st	20 km	1:23:07
2010	World Race Walking Cup	Chihuahua, Mexico	25th	20 km	1:27:24
2011	European Race Walking Cup	Olhão, Portugal	5th	50 km	3:54:19
2011	European Race Walking Cup	Olhão, Portugal	1st	Team - 50 km	16 pts
2011	World Championships	Daegu, South Korea	16th	50 km	3:52:35
2012	World Race Walking Cup	Saransk, Russia	62nd	50 km	4:21:46
2013	European Race Walking Cup	Dudince, Slovakia	15th	50 km	3:56:32
2013	World Championships	Moscow, Russia	24th	50 km	3:54:00
2014	World Race Walking Cup	Taicang, China	19th	50 km	3:53:44
2014	European Championships	Zürich, Switzerland	22nd	50 km	4:01:12

== National titles ==
Ivano Brugnetti has won 3 times the individual national championship.

- 1 win in the 10000 m walk track (2011)
- 2 wins in the 20 km walk (2009, 2010)

== See also ==
- Italy at the European Race Walking Cup - Multiple medalists
- Naturalized athletes of Italy
