= Benjamín Sánchez =

Spanish racewalker

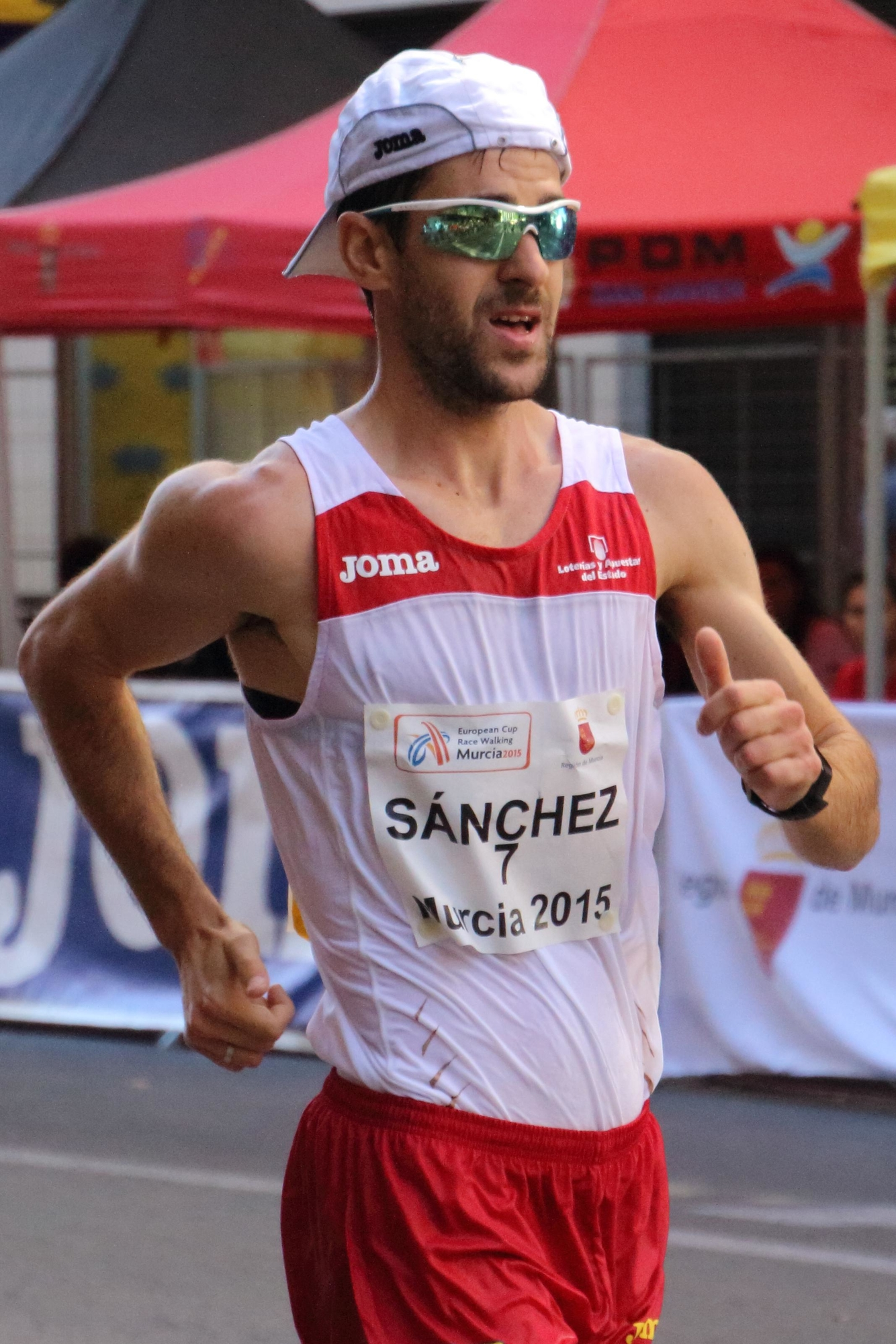

Personal information
- Born: 10 March 1985 (age 41)
- Height: 1.85 m (6 ft 1 in)
- Weight: 70 kg (150 lb)

Sport
- Country: Spain
- Sport: Athletics
- Event: 50km Race Walk

Benjamín Sánchez Bermejo (born 10 March 1985 in Cieza, Murcia) is a Spanish race walker.

== International competitions ==
Year	Competition	Venue	Position	Event	Notes
Representing Spain
2001	World Youth Championships	Debrecen, Hungary	9th	10,000 m	45:01.76
2002	World Junior Championships	Kingston, Jamaica	12th	10,000 m	44:22.59
2003	European Race Walking Cup (U20)	Cheboksary, Russia	10th	10 km	43:35
2003	European Race Walking Cup (U20)	Cheboksary, Russia	2nd	Team - 10 km Junior	11 pts
2003	European Junior Championships	Tampere, Finland	5th	10,000 m	43:25.88
2004	World Junior Championships	Grosseto, Italy	8th	10,000 m	41:21.13
2004	World Race Walking Cup	Naumburg, Germany	3rd	10 km junior	41:19
2005	European Race Walking Cup (U20)	Miskolc, Hungary	17th	20 km	1:25:45
2005	European Race Walking Cup (U20)	Miskolc, Hungary	2nd	Team - 20 km	33 pts
2005	European U23 Championships	Erfurt, Germany	2nd	20 km	1:23:30
2005	Universiade	İzmir, Turkey	10th	20 km	1:29:05
2006	World Race Walking Cup	A Coruña, Spain	20th	20 km	1:22:24
2006	European Championships	Gothenburg, Sweden	13th	20 km	1:25:58
2007	European Race Walking Cup	Royal Leamington Spa, United Kingdom	13th	20 km	1:21:48
2007	European Race Walking Cup	Royal Leamington Spa, United Kingdom	3rd	Team - 20 km	39 pts
2007	European U23 Championships	Debrecen, Hungary	—	20 km	DNF
2007	World Championships	Osaka, Japan	23rd	20 km	1:27:29
2008	World Race Walking Cup	Cheboksary, Russia	13th	20 km	1:20:48
2008	Olympic Games	Beijing, China	13th	20 km	1:21:38
2009	European Race Walking Cup	Metz, France	—	20 km	DNF
2009	European Race Walking Cup	Metz, France	2nd	Team - 20 km	30 pts
2010	World Race Walking Cup	Chihuahua, Mexico	21st	20 km	1:26:55
2011	European Race Walking Cup	Olhão, Portugal	3rd	20 km	1:24:12
2011	European Race Walking Cup	Olhão, Portugal	1st	Team - 20 km	26 pts
2012	World Race Walking Cup	Saransk, Russia	35th	20 km	1:24:10
2012	Olympic Games	London, United Kingdom	49th	50 km	4:14:40
2013	European Race Walking Cup	Dudince, Slovakia	—	20 km	DNF
2014	World Race Walking Cup	Taicang, China	82nd	20 km	1:28:26
2015	European Race Walking Cup	Murcia, Spain	8th	50 km	3:55:45
2015	World Championships	Beijing, China	—	50 km	DNF
