= Kim Hyun-sub =

South Korean racewalker (born 1985)

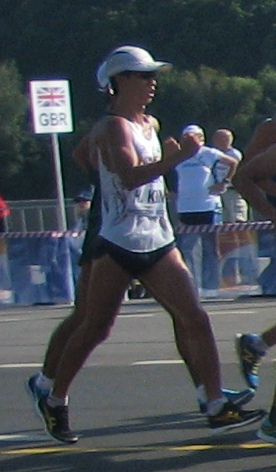
- Kim Hyun-sub in 2013

Personal information
- Born: May 31, 1985 (age 41) Sokcho, South Korea
- Height: 1.75 m (5 ft 9 in)
- Weight: 53 kg (117 lb)

Sport
- Country: South Korea
- Sport: Athletics
- Event: 20km Race Walk
Medal record
Men's athletics
Representing South Korea
Asian Championships
Silver medal – second place	2005 Incheon	20 km walk

Kim Hyun-sub (Korean: 김현섭; RR: Kim Hyeonseob, Korean pronunciation: [kim.ɦjʌn.sʌp̚] or [kim] [hjʌn.sʌp̚]; born May 31, 1985) is a South Korean race walker. He is the first South Korean to win a medal at IAAF World Athletics Championships.

== Competition record ==
Year	Competition	Venue	Position	Event	Notes
Representing South Korea
2002	Asian Junior Championships	Bangkok, Thailand	5th	10,000 m	48:11.00
2004	Asian Junior Championships	Ipoh, Malaysia	2nd	10,000 m	42:49.80
2004	World Junior Championships	Grosseto, Italy	3rd	10,000 m	40:59.24
2004	World Race Walking Cup	Naumburg, Germany	8th	10 km	42:04
2005	Universiade	İzmir, Turkey	2nd	20 km	1:24:42
2005	Asian Championships	Incheon, South Korea	2nd	20 km	1:25:41
2006	Asian Games	Doha, Qatar	2nd	20 km	1:23.12
2007	Universiade	Bangkok, Thailand	6th	20 km	1:27:20
2007	World Championships	Osaka, Japan	20th	20 km	1:26:51
2008	Olympic Games	Beijing, China	23rd	20 km	1:22:57
2008	World Race Walking Cup	Cheboksary, Russia	20th	20 km	1:22:01
2009	Universiade	Belgrade, Serbia	5th	20 km	1:22:00
2009	World Championships	Berlin, Germany	34th	20 km	1:27:08
2009	East Asian Games	Hong Kong	3rd	20 km	1:26:59
2010	Asian Games	Guangzhou, China	3rd	20 km	1:22:47
2011	World Championships	Daegu, South Korea	3rd	20 km	1:21:17
2012	Olympic Games	London, United Kingdom	17th	20 km	1:21:36
2013	World Championships	Moscow, Russia	10th	20 km	1:22:50
2014	Asian Games	Incheon, South Korea	3rd	20 km	1:21:37
2015	World Championships	Beijing, China	10th	20 km	1:21:40
2016	Olympic Games	Rio de Janeiro, Brazil	17th	20 km	1:21:44
2017	World Championships	London, United Kingdom	26th	20 km	1:22:08
2018	Asian Games	Jakarta, Indonesia	4th	20 km walk	1:27:17
