= David Mejia (race walker) =

Mexican race walker

Personal information
- Full name: David Mejía Hernández
- Nationality: Mexico
- Born: 7 December 1986 (age 39) Toluca, Mexico
- Height: 1.64 m (5 ft 4 1/2 in)
- Weight: 54 kg (119 lb)

Sport
- Sport: Athletics
- Event: Race walking

Achievements and titles
- Personal best(s): 10 km walk: 41:56 (2004); 20 km walk: 1:22:36 (2011)

David Mejía Hernández (born December 7, 1986, in Toluca) is a Mexican race walker. He set his personal best time of 1:22:36, by finishing third in the men's 20 km at the 2011 IAAF Race Walking Challenge in Chihuahua, Mexico.

Mejia represented Mexico at the 2008 Summer Olympics in Beijing, where he competed in the men's 20 km race walk, along with his compatriot Eder Sánchez. He successfully finished the race in thirty-sixth place by eight seconds ahead of Italy's Jean-Jacques Nkouloukidi, with a time of 1:26:45.
