= Andriy Kovenko =

Ukrainian race walker (born 1973)

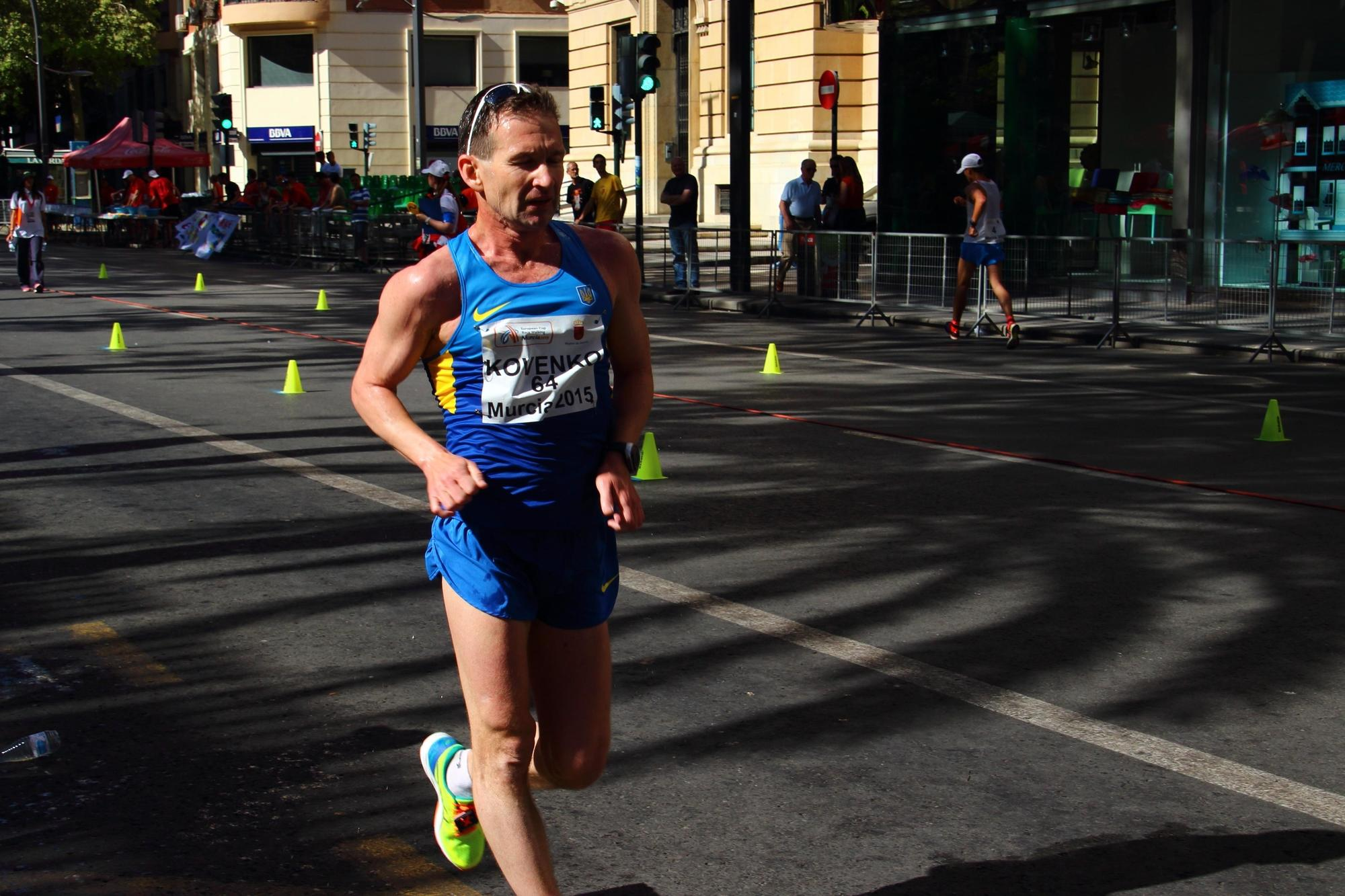
- Kovenko at the 2015 European Cup Race Walking

Personal information
- Full name: Andriy Vitaliyovych Kovenko
- Nationality: Ukraine
- Born: 25 November 1973 (age 52) Vinnytsia, Ukrainian SSR, Soviet Union
- Height: 1.74 m (5 ft 8 1/2 in)
- Weight: 65 kg (143 lb)

Sport
- Sport: Athletics
- Event: Race walking
- Club: Dynamo Vinnytsia

Achievements and titles
- Personal bests: 10 km walk: 39:47 (2011); 20 km walk: 1:20:51 (2012); 50 km walk: 3:58:58 (2009)

Andriy Vitaliyovych Kovenko (Ukrainian: Андрій Віталійович Ковенко; born November 25, 1973) is a Ukrainian race walker. He is a four-time national champion for the 20 km race walk.

At age thirty-four, Kovenko made his official debut for the 2008 Summer Olympics in Beijing, where he competed in the men's 20 km race walk. He finished the race in twenty-fourth place by two seconds behind South Korea's Kim Hyun-Sub, with a time of 1:22:59.
