= Maribel Gonçalves =

Portuguese racewalker

Personal information
- Nationality: Portuguese
- Born: 1 April 1978 (age 48)

Sport
- Sport: Athletics
- Event: Racewalking

Maribel Gonçalves (born 1 April 1978) is a Portuguese racewalker. She competed in the women's 20 kilometres walk at the 2004 Summer Olympics.
