= Marie Polli =

Swiss racewalker (born 1980)

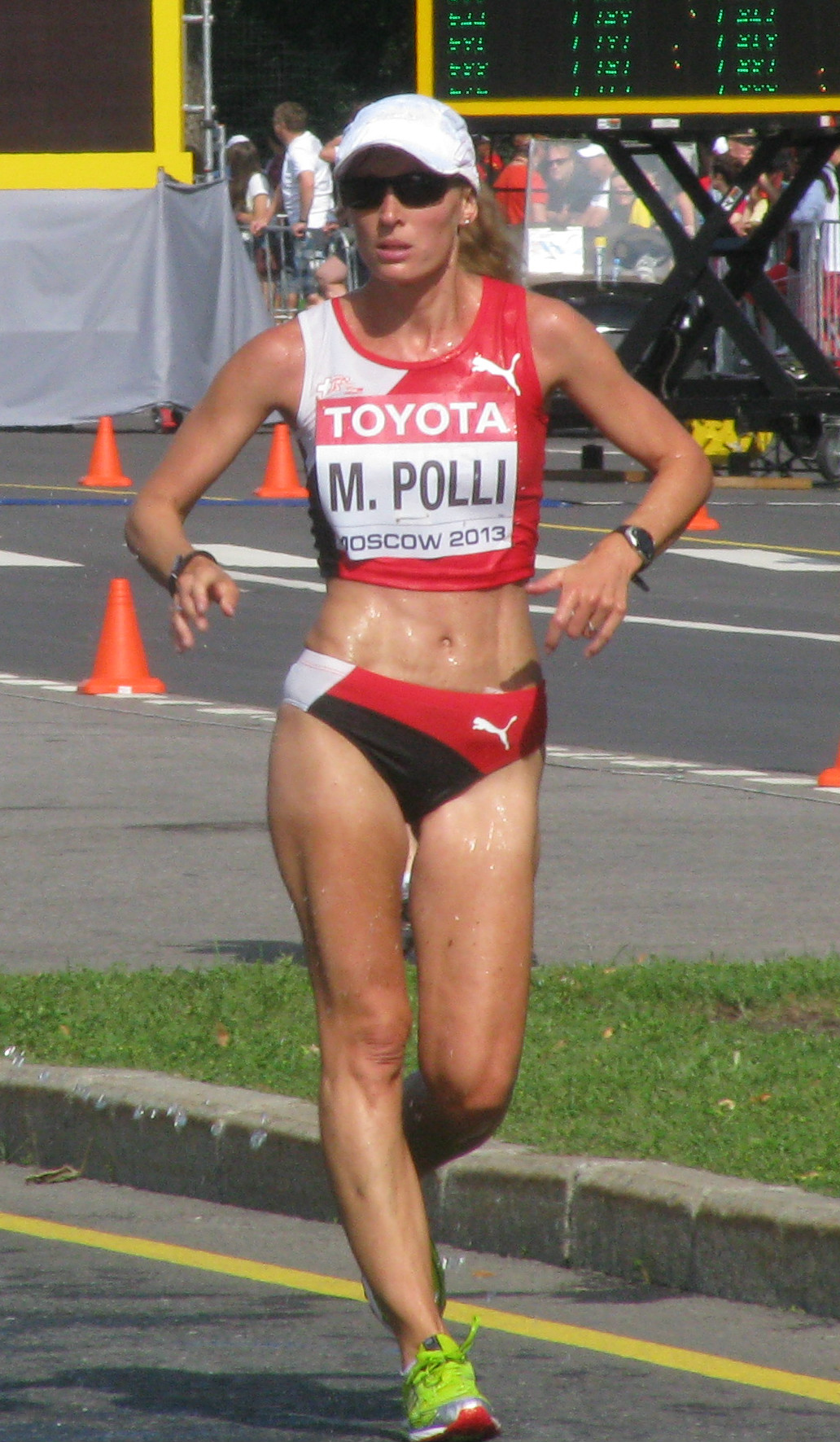

Personal information
- Born: 28 November 1980 (age 45)

Sport
- Country: Switzerland
- Sport: Track and field
- Updated on 29 August 2015

Marie Polli (born 28 November 1980) was a female racewalker from Switzerland.

She competed in the women's 20 kilometres walk event at the 2015 World Championships in Athletics held in Beijing, China, where she finished in 40th place.

== See also ==
- Switzerland at the 2015 World Championships in Athletics
