= María Teresa Gargallo =

Spanish racewalker

Personal information
- Nationality: Spanish
- Born: 15 October 1969 (age 57)

Sport
- Sport: Athletics
- Event: Racewalking

María Teresa Gargallo (born 15 October 1969) is a Spanish racewalker. She competed in the women's 20 kilometres walk at the 2004 Summer Olympics.
