= Lee Dae-ro =

South Korean racewalker

Personal information
- Nationality: South Korean
- Born: 12 March 1980 (age 46)

Sport
- Sport: Athletics
- Event: Racewalking
Medal record
Men's athletics
Representing South Korea
Asian Championships
Bronze medal – third place	2000 Jakarta	20 km walk

Lee Dae-ro (born 12 March 1980) is a South Korean racewalker. He competed in the men's 20 kilometres walk at the 2004 Summer Olympics.
