= Sun Chao (race walker) =

Chinese race walker (born 1987)

Sun Chao (born 8 January 1987) is a Chinese race walker.

== Achievements ==
Year	Competition	Venue	Position	Event	Notes
Representing China
2004	World Junior Championships	Grosseto, Italy	11th	10,000 m	42:04.91
2004	World Race Walking Cup	Naumburg, Germany	1st	10 km	40:38
2007	World Championships	Osaka, Japan	7th	50 km	3:55:43
2008	World Race Walking Cup	Cheboksary, Russia	20th	50 km	3:54:52
