= Vladimir Savanović =

Serbian racewalker

Vladimir Savanović (born 12 June 1985) is a Serbian racewalker. He placed 42nd in the men's 50 kilometres walk at the 2016 Summer Olympics.
