= Chris Erickson =

Australian racewalker

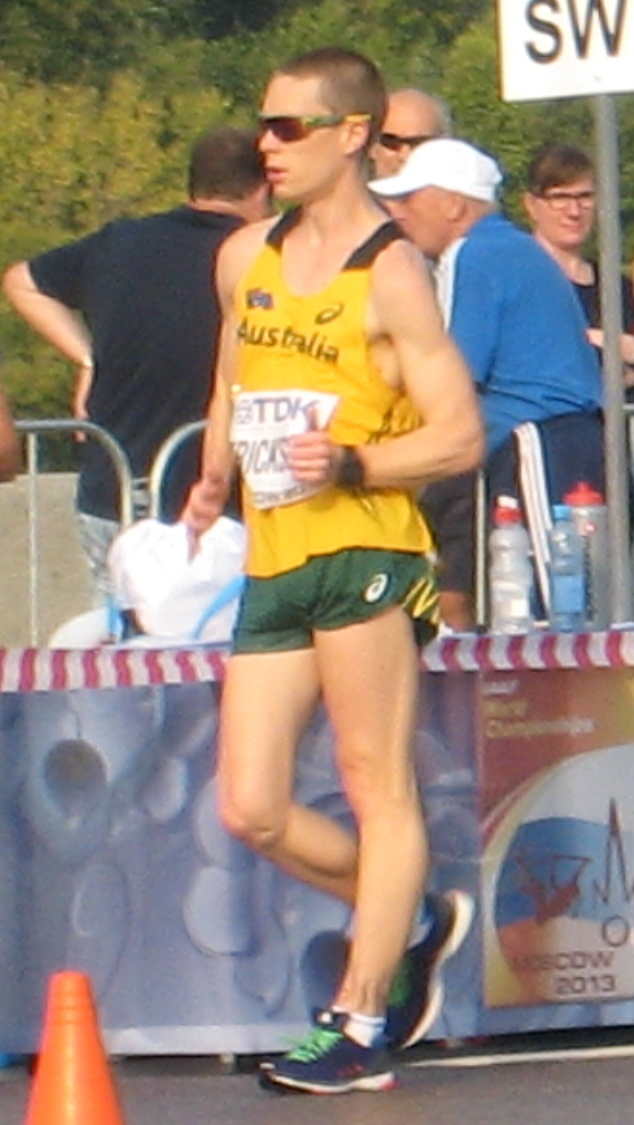
- Chris Erickson in 2013

Personal information
- Born: 1 December 1981 (age 44)
- Height: 1.75 m (5 ft 9 in)
- Weight: 60 kg (130 lb)

Sport
- Country: Australia
- Sport: Athletics
- Event: 20km Race Walk

Chris Erickson (born 1 December 1981) is an Australian racewalker who competed at three Olympiads: in 2008, 2012 and 2016 over the 20 km and 50 km distances. He is also a multiple Australian national champion over the 50 km distance.
