= 2007 World Championships in Athletics – Women's 20 kilometres walk =

The Women's 20 km Race Walk event at the 2007 World Championships in Athletics took place on August 31, 2007 in the streets of Osaka, Japan.

== Medallists ==
Gold	Olga Kaniskina; Russia (RUS)
Silver	Tatyana Shemyakina; Russia (RUS)
Bronze	María Vasco; Spain (ESP)

== Abbreviations ==
- All times shown are in hours:minutes:seconds

DNS	did not start
DQ	disqualified
NM	no mark
WR	world record
WL	world leading
AR	area record
NR	national record
PB	personal best
SB	season best

== Records ==
World record Championship record	1:25:41	Olimpiada Ivanova	Russia	Helsinki, Finland	7 August 2005

== Intermediates ==
Rank	Number	Athlete	Nation	Time
5 KILOMETRES
1	101	Olga Kaniskina	Russia	22:21
2	111	Tatyana Shemyakina	Russia	22:41
3	112	Tatyana Sibileva	Russia	23:00
4	116	María Vasco	Spain	23:22
5	107	Song Hongjuan	China	23:23
10 KILOMETRES
1	101	Olga Kaniskina	Russia	44:33
2	111	Tatyana Shemyakina	Russia	45:17
3	116	María Vasco	Spain	45:53
4	112	Tatyana Sibileva	Russia	45:58
5	105	Kjersti Plätzer	Norway	46:23
15 KILOMETRES
1	101	Olga Kaniskina	Russia	1:06:46
2	111	Tatyana Shemyakina	Russia	1:07:42
3	116	María Vasco	Spain	1:08:09
4	105	Kjersti Plätzer	Norway	1:08:46
5	129	Susana Feitor	Portugal	1:08:51

== Final ranking ==
Rank	Athlete	Nation	Time	Note
1st place, gold medalist(s)	Olga Kaniskina	Russia	1:30:09	
2nd place, silver medalist(s)	Tatyana Shemyakina	Russia	1:30:42	
3rd place, bronze medalist(s)	María Vasco	Spain	1:30:47	
4	Kjersti Plätzer	Norway	1:31:24	
5	Susana Feitor	Portugal	1:32:01	
6	Claudia Stef	Romania	1:32:47	
7	Inês Henriques	Portugal	1:33:06	
8	Sabine Zimmer	Germany	1:33:23	
9	Tatyana Sibileva	Russia	1:33:29	
10	Mayumi Kawasaki	Japan	1:33:35	
11	Vera Santos	Portugal	1:34:28	
12	María José Poves	Spain	1:35:06	
13	Beatriz Pascual	Spain	1:35:13	
14	Melanie Seeger	Germany	1:35:30	
15	Song Hongjuan	China	1:35:44	
16	Elena Ginko	Belarus	1:35:59	
17	Olive Loughnane	Ireland	1:36:00	
18	Zuzana Malíková	Slovakia	1:36:26	
19	Liu Hong	China	1:36:40	
20	Barbora Dibelková	Czech Republic	1:36:45	
21	Marie Polli	Switzerland	1:36:54	
22	Sonata Milušauskaitė	Lithuania	1:37:28	
23	Sylwia Korzeniowska	Poland	1:37:38	
24	Mária Gáliková	Slovakia	1:38:54	
25	Johanna Jackson	Great Britain & N.I.	1:39:34	
26	Kim Mi-Jung	South Korea	1:41:33	
27	Masumi Fuchise	Japan	1:41:49	
28	Svetlana Tolstaya	Kazakhstan	1:41:54	
29	Yadira Guamán	Ecuador	1:42:17	
30	Tania Regina Spindler	Brazil	1:43:56	
31	Sandra Zapata	Colombia	1:44:42	
32	Yeliz Ay	Turkey	1:45:52	
33	Geovana Irusta	Bolivia	1:47:15	SB
—	Ryoko Sakakura	Japan	DQ	
—	Jane Saville	Australia	DQ	
—	Teresa Vaill	United States	DQ	
—	Miriam Ramón	Ecuador	DQ	
—	Olimpiada Ivanova	Russia	DNF	
—	Elisa Rigaudo	Italy	DNF	
—	Jolanta Dukure	Latvia	DNF	
—	Jiang Jing	China	DNF	
—	Athanasia Tsoumeleka	Greece	DNF	
