= Athletics at the 2005 Summer Universiade – Women's 20 kilometres walk =

The women's 20 kilometres walk event at the 2005 Summer Universiade was held on 15 August in İzmir, Turkey.

== Results ==
Rank	Athlete	Nationality	Time	Notes
1st place, gold medalist(s)	Jiang Qiuyan	China	1:33:13	
2nd place, silver medalist(s)	Vera Santos	Portugal	1:33:54	
3rd place, bronze medalist(s)	Tatyana Sibileva	Russia	1:34:16	
4	Iraida Pudovkina	Russia	1:36:11	
5	Natalie Saville	Australia	1:36:42	
6	Zuzana Malíková	Slovakia	1:37:39	
7	Yeliz Ay	Turkey	1:38:50	
8	Annarita Fidanza	Italy	1:39:26	SB
9	Maribel Gonçalves	Portugal	1:40:30	
10	Olga Povalyayeva	Russia	1:41:08	
11	Nadiya Borovska	Ukraine	1:42:44	
12	Lisa Grant	Australia	1:43:39	
13	Suzanne Erasmus	South Africa	1:45:55	SB
14	Marina Crivello	Canada	1:48:37	
15	Daisy González	Mexico	1:51:57	
	Barbora Dibelková	Czech Republic	DNF	
	Despina Zapounidou	Greece	DNF	
	Larisa Yemelyanova	Russia	DQ	
	Athanasia Tsoumeleka	Greece	DNS	
