= August 2004 in sports =

<<	August 2004					>>
Su	Mo	Tu	We	Th	Fr	Sa
1	2	3	4	5	6	7
8	9	10	11	12	13	14
15	16	17	18	19	20	21
22	23	24	25	26	27	28
29	30	31
Sports

This list shows notable sports-related events and notable outcomes that occurred in August of 2004.

== Deaths ==
- 27 Willie Crawford
- 23 Hank Borowy
- 16 Ivan Hlinka
- 13 George Yardley

== August 31, 2004 (Tuesday) ==
- Football (soccer): Manchester United F.C. sign England star Wayne Rooney from Everton F.C. The potential fee of £27 million is the second highest ever for an exclusively British transfer. (Reuters)

== August 30, 2004 (Monday) ==
- Football (soccer): Newcastle United F.C. dismiss their manager, Sir Bobby Robson, following a poor start to their Premier League season and alleged discontent in the dressing room. Striker Alan Shearer is named caretaker manager and is rumoured to be Robson's permanent replacement. (Reuters)
- Ice hockey: The 2004 World Cup of Hockey begins with Finland blanking the Czech Republic 4–0 in the opening match held in Helsinki. (AP)

== August 29, 2004 (Sunday) ==
- 2004 Summer Olympics:
  - Men's Marathon: Vanderlei de Lima from Brazil is pushed into the crowd by Cornelius Horan (who ran onto the track during the Formula One 2003 British Grand Prix at Silverstone) while leading in the last 10 km of the race. Vanderlei loses around 15–20 seconds but finishes in third place. (BBC)
  - Gold medal winners on day 16: (BBC)
    - Athletics
      - Men's Marathon: Stefano Baldini, ITA
    - Boxing:
      - Men's Under 48 kg: Yan Bartelemí Varela, CUB
      - Men's 51–54 kg: Guillermo Rigondeaux Ortiz, CUB
      - Men's 57–60 kg: Mario Cesar Kindelan Mesa, CUB
      - Men's 64–69 kg: Bakhtiyar Artayev, KAZ
      - Men's 75–81 kg: Andre Ward, USA
      - Men's Over 91 kg: Alexander Povetkin, RUS
    - Handball:
      - Men: Croatia
      - Women: Denmark
    - Gymnastics:
      - Women's Individual All-Around Rhythmic: Alina Kabaeva, RUS
    - Taekwondo:
      - Women's Over 67 kg: Zhong Chen, CHN
      - Men's Over 80 kg: Dae Sung Moon, KOR
    - Volleyball:
      - Men: Brazil
    - Water Polo:
      - Men: Hungary
    - Wrestling:
      - Men's Freestyle 60 kg: Yandro Miguel Quintana, CUB
      - Men's Freestyle 74 kg: Buvaysa Saytiev, RUS
      - Men's Freestyle 96 kg: Khadjimourat Gatsalov, RUS
- Kimi Räikkönen wins the Belgian Grand Prix Formula One ahead of Michael Schumacher, who clinches his seventh championship title. (BBC)
- Baseball: Team Curaçao beats team Thousand Oaks, California, 5–2, to win the Little League World Series. (ESPN)

== August 28, 2004 (Saturday) ==
- 2004 Summer Olympics: Gold medal winners on day 15: (BBC)
  - Athletics:
    - Women's High Jump: Yelena Slesarenko, RUS
    - Women's 1500 m: Kelly Holmes, GBR
    - Men's Javelin: Andreas Thorkildsen, NOR
    - Men's 800 m: Yuriy Borzakovskiy, RUS
    - Men's 5000 m: Hicham El Guerrouj, MAR
    - Men's 4 × 100 m Relay: Great Britain (Jason Gardener, Darren Campbell, Marlon Devonish, Mark Lewis-Francis)
    - Men's 4 × 400 m Relay: United States (Otis Harris, Derrick Brew, Jeremy Wariner, Darold Williamson)
    - Women's 4 × 400 m Relay: United States (DeeDee Trotter, Monique Henderson, Sanya Richards, Monique Hennagan)
  - Basketball:
    - Men: Argentina
    - Women: United States
  - Boxing:
    - Men's 48–51 kg: Yuriorkis Gamboa Toledano. CUB
    - Men's 54–57 kg: Kim Song Guk, PRK
    - Men's 60–64 kg: Manus Boonjumnong, THA
    - Men's 69–75 kg: Gaydarbek Gaydarbekov, RUS
    - Men's 81–91 kg: Odlanier Solís Fonte, CUB
  - Canoeing:
    - Men's K-1 500 m: Adam van Koeverden, CAN
    - Men's C-1 500 m: Andreas Dittmer, GER
    - Women's K-1 500 m: Natasa Janics, HUN
    - Men's K-2 500 m: Ronald Rauhe, Tim Wieskoetter, GER
    - Men's C-2 500 m: Meng Guanliang, Yang Wenjun, CHN
    - Women's K-2 500 m: Katalin Kovács, Natasa Janics, HUN
  - Cycling:
    - Men's Individual Mountain Bike: Julien Absalon, FRA
  - Diving:
    - Men's 10 m Platform: Jia Hu, CHN
  - Football:
    - Men: Argentina
  - Gymnastics:
    - Women's Group Rhythmic: Russia
  - Sailing:
    - Men's Keelboat: Torben Grael, Marcelo Ferreira, BRA
    - Men's Multihull: Roman Hagara, Hans Peter Steinacher, AUS
  - Taekwondo:
    - Women's 57–67 kg: Wei Luo, CHN
    - Men's 68–80 kg: Steven López, USA
  - Volleyball:
    - Women: People's Republic of China
  - Wrestling:
    - Men's Freestyle 55 kg: Mavlet Batirov, RUS
    - Men's Freestyle 66 kg: Elbrus Tedeyev, UKR
    - Men's Freestyle 84 kg: Cael Sanderson, USA
    - Men's Freestyle 120 kg: Artur Taymazov, UZB
- NASCAR Nextel Cup: Dale Earnhardt Jr. wins the Sharpie 500 at Bristol Motor Speedway. The win is Junior's first since being badly burnt in practice for a Trans-Am race, and comes a day after winning the Busch Series race held at the same track. ESPN.com

== August 27, 2004 (Friday) ==
- 2004 Summer Olympics: Gold medal winners on day 14: (BBC)
  - Athletics:
    - Women's 10,000 m: Xing Huina, CHN
    - Men's 100 m Hurdles: Liu Xiang, CHN
    - Women's 4 × 100 m Relay: Jamaica (Tayna Lawrence, Sherone Simpson, Aleen Bailey, Veronica Campbell)
    - Men's 50 km Race Walk: Robert Korzeniowski, POL
    - Women's Javelin Throw: Osleidys Menéndez, CUB
    - Women's Long Jump: Tatyana Lebedeva, RUS
    - Men's Pole Vault: Timothy Mack, USA
  - Canoeing:
    - Men's C-1 1000 m: David Cal, ESP
    - Men's C-2 1000 m: Germany (Christian Gille, Tomasz Wylenzek)
    - Men's K-1 1000 m: Eirik Verås Larsen, NOR
    - Men's K-2 1000 m: Sweden (Markus Oscarsson, Henrik Nilsson)
    - Men's K-4 1000 m: Hungary (Zoltan Kammerer, Botond Storcz, Ákos Vereckei, Gabor Horvath)
    - Women's K-4 500 m: Germany (Birgit Fischer, Maike Nollen, Katrin Wagner, Carolin Leonhardt)
  - Cycling:
    - Women's Individual Mountain Bike: Gunn-Rita Dahle, NOR
  - Equestrian:
    - Mixed Individual Show Jumping: Cian O'Connor – Waterford Crystal, IRE
  - Hockey:
    - Men: Australia
  - Modern pentathlon:
    - Women's Individual: Zsuzsanna Vörös, HUN
  - Synchronized Swimming:
    - Women's Team: Russia
  - Taekwondo:
    - Women's 49–57 kg: Ji Won Jang, KOR
    - Men's 58–68 kg: Hadia Saei Bonehkohal, IRN

== August 26, 2004 (Thursday) ==
- 2004 Summer Olympics: Gold medal winners on day 13: (BBC)
  - Athletics:
    - Men's 200 m: Shawn Crawford, USA
    - Men's 400 m Hurdles: Félix Sánchez, DOM
    - Men's Long Jump: Dwight Phillips, USA
  - Diving:
    - Women's 3 m Springboard: Jingjing Guo, CHN
  - Football:
    - Women: United States
  - Hockey:
    - Women: Germany
  - Modern pentathlon:
    - Men's Individual: Andrey Moiseev, RUS
  - Sailing:
    - Mixed 49er: Iker Martínez and Xabier Fernández, ESP
  - Taekwondo:
    - Women's Under 49 kg: Shih Hsin Chen, TPE
    - Men's Under 58 kg: Mu Yen Chu, TPE
  - Triathlon:
    - Men's Individual: Hamish Carter, NZL
  - Water Polo:
    - Women: Italy
  - Wrestling:
    - Men's Greco-Roman 55–60 kg: Ji Hyun Jung, KOR
    - Men's Greco-Roman 66–74 kg: Alexandr Dokturishivili, UZB
    - Men's Greco-Roman 84–96 kg: Karam Ibrahim, EGY
    - Men's Greco-Roman 96–120 kg: Khasan Baroyev, RUS
- UEFA Cup 2004–05 Second qualifying round second leg. Teams progressing to the first round proper in bold:
  - **CSKA Sofia** 3 – 1 AC Omonia
  - **FC Zenit St Peterburg** 2 – 0 SV Pasching (Zenit win on away goals rule)
  - **NK Maribor** 0 – 1 FK Budućnost Banatski Dvor (Maribor win on away goals rule)
  - **PFC Litex Lovech** 7 – 0 NK Željeznicar Sarajevo
  - NK Primorje 2 – 0 **Dinamo Zagreb**
  - NK Rijeka 2 – 1 **Gençlerbirligi** (Gençlerbirligi win on away goals rule)
  - FK Modriča 0 – 3 **PFC Levski Sofia**
  - KF Partizani Tirana 1 – 3 **Hapoel Bnei Sakhnin FC**
  - **FC Steaua București** 1 – 2 FC Železnik
  - Servette FC 0 – 2 **Újpest FC**
  - FC Tiraspol 1 – 2 **FC Metalurh Donetsk**
  - **Legia Warszawa** 6 – 0 FC Tbilisi
  - Budapest Honvéd FC 1 – 0 **Amica Wronki**
  - **IF Elfsborg** 2 – 1 Glentoran F.C.
  - FC Vaduz 1 – 2 **K.S.K.Beveren**
  - FK Ekranas 2 – 1 **Odd Grenland**
  - Brøndby IF 1 – 1 **FK Ventspils** (Ventspils win on away goals rule)
  - ÍA Akranes 1 – 2 **Hammarby IF**
  - FC Haka 1 – 3 **Stabæk**
  - FC Levadia Tallinn 2 – 1 **F.K. Bodø/Glimt**
  - Dunfermline Athletic F.C. 1 – 2 **Fimleikafélag Hafnarfjarðar**
  - **Aalborg Boldspilklub** 0 – 0 FK Žalgiris Vilnius
  - **FK Liepājas Metalurgs** 1 – 1 Östers IF (Metalurgs win on away goals rule)
  - **FK Partizan** 1 – 0 FC Oţelul Galaţi
  - **Maccabi Petach Tikva FC** 4 – 0 AEK Larnaca F.C.
  - Lech Poznań 0 – 1 **FC Terek Grozny**
  - **Dinamo Tbilisi FC** 2 – 0 SK Slavia Praha (Dinamo win on away goals rule)
  - FC Rubin Kazan 0 – 3 **SK Rapid Wien**
  - **FK Austria Wien** 3 – 0 FC Illichivets Mariupol
  - FC Wil 1900 1 – 1 **FK Dukla Banská Bystrica**
  - **SK Sigma Olomouc** 4 – 0 FC Nistru Otaci
  - **FC Dnipro Dnipropetrovsk** 1 – 1 FC Artmedia Bratislava (UEFA.com)

== August 25, 2004 (Wednesday) ==
- 2004 Summer Olympics: Gold medal winners on day 12: (BBC)
  - Athletics:
    - Women's 200 m: Veronica Campbell, JAM
    - Women's 400 m Hurdles: Fani Halkia, GRE
    - Women's Hammer Throw: Olga Kuzenkova, RUS
  - Baseball:
    - Men: Cuba
  - Beach Volleyball:
    - Men: Ricardo Alex Santos and Emanuel Rego, BRA
  - Cycling:
    - Men's Keirin: Ryan Bayley, AUS
    - Men's Madison: Graeme Brown and Stuart O'Grady, AUS
    - Women's Points Race: Olga Slyusareva, RUS
  - Equestrian:
    - Mixed Individual Dressage: Anky van Grunsven – Salinero, NED
  - Sailing:
    - Men's Windsurfing Mistral: Gal Fridman, ISR
    - Women's Windsurfing Mistral: Faustine Merret, FRA
  - Synchronized Swimming:
    - Women's Duet: Anastasia Davydova and Anastasia Ermakova, RUS
  - Triathlon:
    - Women's Individual: Kate Allen, AUT
  - Weightlifting:
    - Men's Over 105 kg: Hossein Reza Zadeh, IRN
  - Wrestling:
    - Men's Greco-Roman Under 55 kg: István Majoros, HUN
    - Men's Greco-Roman 60–66 kg: Farid Mansurov, AZE
    - Men's Greco-Roman 74–84 kg: Aleksey Mishin, RUS
- FA Premier League: Arsenal beat Blackburn Rovers 3–0 to set a new record of 43 consecutive league matches without defeat. Nottingham Forest's previous record stood for 26 years. (BBC)
- UEFA Champions League 2004–05 Third qualifying round, second leg. Teams progressing to the group stage in bold:
  - Trabzonspor 0 – 2 **Dynamo Kyiv**
  - **Maccabi Tel Aviv F.C.** 1 – 0 PAOK
  - Rangers F.C. 1 – 1 **PFC CSKA Moskva**
  - **AC Sparta Praha** 2 – 0 Ferencváros (aet)
  - **Manchester United F.C.** 3 – 0 F.C. Dinamo București
  - Club Brugge KV 2 – 2 **FC Shakhtar Donetsk**
  - **PSV Eindhoven** 5 – 0 FK Crvena Zvezda
  - FC Baník Ostrava 2 – 1 **Bayer Leverkusen**
  - Djurgårdens IF 1 – 4 **Juventus**
  - **Real Madrid** 3 – 1 Wisła Kraków (UEFA.com)

== August 24, 2004 (Tuesday) ==
- 2004 Summer Olympics:
  - Athletics: After "refusing or failing to admit a urine sample", men's Discus champion Róbert Fazekas (HUN) is stripped of his title. Virgilijus Alekna (LTU) now receives the gold medal. (BBC)
  - Gold medal winners on day 11: (BBC)
    - Athletics:
      - Women's 100 m Hurdles: Joanna Hayes, USA
      - Men's 1500 m: Hicham El Guerrouj, MAR
      - Men's 3000 m Steeplechase: Ezekiel Kemboi, KEN
      - Women's 400 m: Tonique Williams-Darling, BAH
      - Men's Decathlon: Roman Šebrle, CZE
      - Women's Pole Vault: Yelena Isinbayeva, RUS
    - Beach Volleyball:
      - Women: Kerri Walsh and Misty May, USA
    - Cycling:
      - Men's Points Race: Mikhail Ignatiev, RUS
      - Men's Sprint: Ryan Bayley, AUS
      - Women's Sprint: Lori-Ann Muenzer, CAN
    - Diving:
      - Men's 3 m Springboard: Bo Peng, CHN
    - Equestrian:
      - Mixed Team Jumping: Germany (Ludger Beerbaum – Goldfever, Marco Kutscher – Montender, Otto Becker – Cento, Christian Ahlmann – Coster)
    - Weightlifting:
      - Men's 94–105 kg: Dmitry Berestov, RUS
- UEFA Champions League 2004–05 Third qualifying round, second leg. Teams progressing to the group stage in bold:
  - **Liverpool** 0–1 Grazer AK
  - **Anderlecht** 3–0 Benfica
  - **AS Monaco** 6–0 NK Gorica
  - **Internazionale** 4–1 Basel
  - **Deportivo de La Coruña** 3–0 Shelbourne
  - Maccabi Haifa 2–3 **Rosenborg** (UEFA.com)

== August 23, 2004 (Monday) ==
- 2004 Summer Olympics:
  - Athletics: Shot put winner Irina Korzhanenko (RUS) fails a drug test and is stripped of her gold medal. The Olympic title goes to Yumileidi Cumbá (CUB) instead. (BBC)
  - Gold medal winners on day 10: (BBC)
    - Athletics:
      - Women's 20 km Race Walk: Athanasia Tsoumeleka, GRE
      - Men's 400 m: Jeremy Wariner, USA
      - Women's 5000 m: Meseret Defar, ETH
      - Women's 800 m: Kelly Holmes, GBR
      - Men's Discus: Virgilijus Alekna, LTU (revised result: see August 24)
      - Women's Triple Jump: Françoise Mbango Etone, CMR
    - Cycling:
      - Men's Team Pursuit 400 m: Australia (Graeme Brown, Brett Lancaster, Brad McGee, Luke Roberts)
    - Gymnastics:
      - Women's Balance Beam: Cătălina Ponor, ROM
      - Women's Floor Exercise: Cătălina Ponor, ROM
      - Men's Horizontal Bar: Igor Cassina, ITA
      - Men's Horse Vault: Gervasio Deferr, ESP
      - Men's Parallel Bars: Valeri Goncharov, UKR
    - Table Tennis:
      - Men's Singles: Seung Min Ryu, KOR
    - Weightlifting:
      - Men's 85–94 kg: Milen Dobrev, BUL
    - Wrestling:
      - Women's Freestyle Under 48 kg: Irini Merleni, UKR
      - Women's Freestyle 48–55 kg: Saori Yoshida, JPN
      - Women's Freestyle 55–63 kg: Kaori Icho, JPN
      - Women's Freestyle 63–72 kg: Xu Wang, CHN

== August 22, 2004 (Sunday) ==
- 2004 Summer Olympics: gold medal winners on day 9: (BBC)
  - Athletics:
    - Men's 100 m: Justin Gatlin, USA
    - Men's hammer throw: Adrián Annus, HUN
    - Men's high jump: Stefan Holm, SWE
    - Men's triple jump: Christian Olsson, SWE
    - Women's marathon: Mizuki Noguchi, JPN
  - Cycling:
    - Women's individual pursuit 3000 m: Sarah Ulmer, NZL
  - Diving:
    - Women's 10 m platform: Chantelle Newbery, AUS
  - Fencing:
    - Men's team épée: France (Hugues Obry, Érik Boisse, Fabrice Jeannet, Jérôme Jeannet)
  - Gymnastics:
    - Women's asymmetric bars: Émilie Lepennec, FRA
    - Men's floor exercise: Kyle Shewfelt, CAN
    - Women's horse vault: Monica Roşu, ROM
    - Men's pommel horse: Haibin Teng, CHN
    - Men's rings: Dimosthenis Tampakos, GRE
  - Rowing:
    - Men's lightweight coxless four: Denmark (Thor Kristensen, Thomas Ebert, Stephan Mølvig, Eskild Ebbesen)
    - Men's coxless quadruple sculls: Russia (Nikolay Spinyov, Igor Kravtsov, Aleksey Svirin, Sergey Fedorovtsev)
    - Women's coxless quadruple sculls: Germany (Kathrin Boron, Meike Evers, Manuela Lutze, Kerstin El Qalqili)
    - Men's eight: United States (Jason Read, Wyatt Allen, Chris Ahrens, Joseph Hansen, Matt Deakin, Dan Beery, Beau Hoopman, Bryan Volpenhein, Peter Cipollone)
    - Women's eight: Romania (Rodica Florea, Viorica Susanu, Aurica Bărăscu, Ioana Papuc, Liliana Gafencu, Elisabeta Lipă, Georgeta Damian, Doina Ignat, Elena Georgescu)
    - Men's lightweight double sculls: Poland (Tomasz Kucharski, Robert Sycz)
    - Women's lightweight double sculls: Romania (Constanța Burcică, Angela Alupei)
  - Sailing:
    - Women's Europe: Siren Sundby, NOR
    - Mixed Laser: Robert Scheidt, BRA
  - Shooting:
    - Men's 50 m free rifle 3 positions: Zhanbo Jia, CHN
    - Men's skeet: Andrea Benelli, ITA
  - Table tennis:
    - Women's singles: Zhang Yining, CHN
  - Tennis:
    - Men's singles: Nicolás Massú, CHI
    - Women's doubles: Li Ting and Sun Tiantian, CHN
- NASCAR Nextel Cup: Greg Biffle wins the GFS Marketplace 400 in Brooklyn, Michigan for his second career Nextel Cup victory. Biffle leads nearly half of the laps in a car featuring a special Justice League paint scheme. (ESPN.com)

== August 21, 2004 (Saturday) ==
- 2004 Summer Olympics:
  - Rowing: Matthew Pinsent wins his fourth gold in consecutive Olympics in the men's coxless four. Pinsent, Ed Coode, James Cracknell and Steve Williams hold off the Canadian world champions to win by 0.08s. (BBC)
  - Equestrian: After an appeal to the Court of Arbitration for Sport by Great Britain, France and the United States, the results of the Mixed Individual and Mixed Team competitions are changed. Penalty points awarded to Bettina Hoy of Germany for crossing the start gate twice, then removed on appeal (giving Hoy the individual gold and Germany the team gold), are reinstated. Leslie Law (GBR) is awarded the individual gold, and France the team gold. (BBC)
  - Gold medal winners on day 8: (BBC)
    - Archery:
      - Men's Team (70 m): Korea (Dong Hyun Im, Yong Ho Jang, Kyung Mo Park)
    - Athletics:
      - Women's 100 m: Yulia Nestsiarenka, BLR
      - Women's Discus: Natalya Sadova, RUS
      - Women's Heptathlon: Carolina Klüft, SWE
    - Badminton:
      - Women's Doubles: Zhang Jiewen and Yang Wei, CHN
      - Men's Singles: Taufik Hidayat, INA
    - Cycling:
      - Men's Individual Pursuit: Bradley Wiggins, GBR
      - Men's Team Sprint: Germany (Jens Fiedler, Stefan Nimke, René Wolff)
    - Equestrian:
      - Dressage Mixed Team: Germany (Ulla Salzgeber – Rusty, Martin Schaudt – Weltall, Hubertus Schmidt – Wansuela Suerte, Heike Kemmer – Bonaparte)
    - Fencing:
      - Men's Team Foil: Italy (Simone Vanni, Salvatore Sanzo, Andrea Cassarà)
    - Gymnastics:
      - Men's Individual Trampoline: Yuri Nikitin, UKR
    - Rowing:
      - Men's Coxless Four: Great Britain (Steve Williams, James Cracknell, Ed Coode, Matthew Pinsent)
      - Men's Coxless Pair: Australia (Drew Ginn, James Tomkins)
      - Women's Coxless Pair: Romania (Georgeta Damian, Viorica Susanu)
      - Men's Double Sculls: France (Sébastien Vieilledent, Adrien Hardy)
      - Women's Double Sculls: New Zealand (Georgina Evers-Swindell, Caroline Evers-Swindell)
      - Men's Single Sculls: Olaf Tufte, NOR
      - Women's Single Sculls: Katrin Rutschow-Stomporowski, GER
    - Sailing:
      - Men's 470: United States (Paul Foerster, Kevin Burnham)
      - Women's 470: Greece (Sofia Bekatorou, Aimilia Tsoulfa)
      - Men's Finn: Ben Ainslie, GBR
      - Women's Yngling: Great Britain (Shirley Robertson, Sarah Webb, Sarah Ayton)
    - Shooting:
      - Men's 25m Rapid Fire Pistol: Ralf Schumann, GER
    - Swimming:
      - Men's 1500 m Freestyle: Grant Hackett, AUS
      - Men's 4 × 100 m Medley Relay: United States (Aaron Peirsol, Brendan Hansen, Ian Crocker, Jason Lezak)
      - Women's 4 × 100 m Medley Relay: Australia (Giaan Rooney, Leisel Jones, Petria Thomas, Jodie Henry)
      - Women's 50 m Freestyle: Inge de Bruijn, NED
    - Table Tennis:
      - Men's Doubles: Qi Chen and Ma Lin, CHN
    - Tennis:
      - Women's Singles: Justine Henin-Hardenne, BEL
      - Men's Doubles: Fernando González and Nicolás Massú, CHI
    - Weightlifting:
      - Men's 77–85 kg: George Asanidze, GEO
      - Women's Over 75 kg: Tang Gonghong, CHN
- Test cricket: England beat the West Indies by ten wickets in the fourth and final Test match, at The Oval. England have now won seven consecutive Test matches, a feat they haven't achieved for 75 years. (BBC)
- Rugby union: In the final match of the Tri Nations Series held in Durban, the Springboks (South Africa) hold off a late charge by the Wallabies (Australia) to win 23–19, winning the Tri Nations for the first time since 1998.

== August 20, 2004 (Friday) ==
- English football player Jonathan Woodgate makes a surprise move from Newcastle United to Spanish side Real Madrid, for a transfer fee of £15 million. Woodgate is the second English footballer in the space of a week to sign for Real, following Michael Owen's transfer from Liverpool. They join fellow Englishman David Beckham, who has been a player at the club for a year.
- 2004 Summer Olympics: Gold medal winners on day 7: (BBC)
  - Archery:
    - Women's Team (70 m): Korea (Lee Sung-jin, Park Sung-hyun, Yun Mi-jin)
  - Athletics:
    - Men's 10,000 m: Kenenisa Bekele, ETH
    - Men's 20 km Walk: Ivano Brugnetti, ITA
  - Badminton:
    - Men's Doubles: Kim Dong-moon and Ha Tae-kwon, KOR
  - Canoeing:
    - Men's C-2 Slalom: Pavol Hochschorner and Peter Hochschorner, SVK
    - Men's K-1 Slalom: Benoît Peschier, FRA
  - Cycling:
    - Men's 1 km Time Trial: Chris Hoy, GBR
    - Women's 500 m Time Trial: Anna Meares, AUS
  - Fencing:
    - Women's Team Épée: Russia (Oxana Ermakova, Anna Sivkova, Tatiana Logounova, Karina Aznavourian)
  - Gymnastics:
    - Women's Individual Trampoline: Anna Dogonadze, GER
  - Judo:
    - Men's Over 100 kg: Keiji Suzuki, JPN
    - Women's Over 78 kg: Maki Tsukada, JPN
  - Shooting:
    - Men's 50 m Free Rifle Prone: Matthew Emmons, USA
    - Women's 50 m Rifle 3 Positions: Lioubov Galkina, RUS
  - Swimming:
    - Men's 100 m Butterfly: Michael Phelps, USA
    - Men's 50 m Freestyle: Gary Hall, USA
    - Women's 200 m Backstroke: Kirsty Coventry, ZIM
    - Women's 800 m Freestyle: Ai Shibata, JPN
  - Table Tennis:
    - Women's Doubles: Nan Wang and Yining Zhang, CHN
  - Weightlifting:
    - Women's 69–75 kg: Pawina Thongsuk, THA
- Boxing: Former world Heavyweight champion Riddick Bowe announces he will attempt a comeback.(ESPN)

== August 19, 2004 (Thursday) ==
- 2004 Summer Olympics: Gold medal winners on day 6: (BBC)
  - Archery:
    - Men's Individual (70 m): Marco Galiazzo, ITA
  - Badminton:
    - Mixed Doubles: Zhang Jun and Gao Ling, CHN
    - Women's Singles: Zhang Ning, CHN
  - Fencing:
    - Men's Team Sabre: France (Gaël Touya, Julien Pillet, Damien Touya)
  - Gymnastics:
    - Women's Artistic Individual All-Around: Carly Patterson, USA
  - Judo:
    - Women's 70–78 kg: Noriko Anno, JPN
    - Men's 90–100 kg: Ihar Makarau, BLR
  - Shooting:
    - Men's 10 m Running Target: Manfred Kurzer, GER
    - Women's Skeet: Diána Igaly, HUN
  - Swimming:
    - Women's 100 m Freestyle: Jodie Henry, AUS
    - Women's 200 m Breaststroke: Amanda Beard, USA
    - Men's 200 m Backstroke: Aaron Peirsol, USA
    - Men's 200 m Medley: Michael Phelps, USA
  - Weightlifting:
    - Women's 62–69 kg: Chunhong Liu, CHN
    - Men's 69–77 kg: Taner Sağır, TUR

== August 18, 2004 (Wednesday) ==
- 2004 Summer Olympics:
  - Athletics: Konstantinos Kenteris and Ekaterini Thanou, who missed a mandatory drugs test last Thursday, withdraw from the games after an IOC disciplinary hearing – even though the IOC chose not to take any action against them. A meeting of the IAAF on August 26 will consider whether a doping offence has been committed. (BBC)
  - Equestrian: Bettina Hoy of Germany crosses the start line twice, and is awarded penalty points. After an appeal, the points are removed. This gives Hoy the gold medal in the individual event, and Germany gold in the team event, overturned on appeal (see August 21).
  - Gold medal winners on day 5: (BBC)
    - Archery:
      - Women's Individual (70 m): Park Sung-hyun, KOR
    - Athletics:
      - Men's Shot Put: Yuriy Bilonog, UKR
      - Women's Shot Put: Yumileidi Cumbá, CUB (revised result: See August 23)
    - Canoeing:
      - Men's C-1 Slalom: Tony Estanguet, FRA
      - Women's K-1 Slalom: Elena Kaliská, SVK
    - Cycling:
      - Men's Individual Time Trial: Tyler Hamilton, USA
      - Women's Individual Time Trial: Leontien Zijlaard-Van Moorsel, NED
    - Equestrian:
      - Mixed Individual: Leslie Law, Shear L'Eau, GBR (result changed after appeal)
      - Mixed Team: France (Nicolas Touzaint – Galan de Sauvagere, Jean Teulère – Espoir de la Mare, Didier Courrèges – Deba d'Estruval, Cédric Lyard – Fine Merveille, Arnaud Boiteau – Expo du Moulin) (result changed after appeal)
    - Fencing:
      - Women's Individual Foil: Valentina Vezzali, ITA
    - Gymnastics:
      - Men's Artistic Individual All-Around: Paul Hamm, USA
    - Judo:
      - Women's 63–70 kg: Masae Ueno, JPN
      - Men's 81–90 kg: Zurab Zviadauri, GEO
    - Shooting:
      - Women's 25m Sport Pistol: Mariya Grozdeva, BUL
      - Women's Double Trap: Kimberly Rhode, USA
    - Swimming:
      - Men's 100 m Freestyle: Pieter van den Hoogenband, NED
      - Men's 200 m Breaststroke: Kosuke Kitajima, JPN
      - Women's 200 m Butterfly: Otylia Jędrzejczak, POL
      - Women's 4 × 200 m Freestyle Relay: United States (Natalie Coughlin, Carly Piper, Dana Vollmer, Kaitlin Sandeno)
    - Weightlifting:
      - Women's 58–63 kg: Nataliya Skakun, UKR
      - Men's 62–69 kg: Guozheng Zhang, CHN

== August 17, 2004 (Tuesday) ==
- 2004 Summer Olympics: Gold medal winners on day 4: (BBC)
  - Fencing:
    - Men's Individual Épée: Marcel Fischer, SUI
    - Women's Individual Sabre: Mariel Zagunis, USA
  - Gymnastics:
    - Women's Team Artistic: Romania (Oana Ban, Alexandra Eremia, Cătălina Ponor, Monica Roşu, Nicoleta Daniela Şofronie, Silvia Stroescu)
  - Judo:
    - Women's 57–63 kg: Ayumi Tanimoto, JPN
    - Men's 73–81 kg: Ilias Iliadis, GRE
  - Shooting:
    - Men's 50 m Free Pistol: Mikhail Nestruev, RUS
    - Men's Double Trap: Ahmed Al Maktoum, UAE
  - Swimming:
    - Men's 200 m Butterfly: Michael Phelps, USA
    - Men's 4 × 200 m Freestyle Relay: United States (Michael Phelps, Ryan Lochte, Peter Vanderkaay, Klete Keller)
    - Women's 200 m Freestyle: Camelia Potec, ROM
    - Women's 200 m Medley: Yana Klochkova, UKR

== August 16, 2004 (Monday) ==
- Ice hockey: Ivan Hlinka, head coach of the Czech team, dies after being injured in a car crash, days before training camp opens for the 2004 World Cup of Hockey. (CBC news)
- Test cricket: England beat the West Indies by seven wickets at Old Trafford in the third Test, securing the series. England's last-innings total of 231 is a record winning score in Old Trafford Tests. (BBC)
- 2004 Summer Olympics: Gold medal winners on day 3:
  - Diving:
    - Women's Synchronized 10 m Platform: Lao Lishi and Li Ting, CHN
    - Men's Synchronized 3m Springboard: Nikolaos Siranidis and Thomas Bimis, GRE
  - Fencing:
    - Men's Individual Foil: Brice Guyart, FRA
  - Gymnastics:
    - Men's Team Artistic: Japan (Takehiro Kashima, Hisashi Mizutori, Daisuke Nakano, Hiroyuki Tomita, Naoya Tsukahara, Isao Yoneda)
  - Judo:
    - Women's 52–57 kg: Yvonne Bönisch, GER
    - Men's 66–73 kg: Won Hee Lee, KOR
  - Shooting:
    - Women's Trap: Suzanne Balogh, AUS
    - Men's 10 m Air Rifle: Qinan Zhu, CHN
  - Swimming:
    - Men's 200 m Freestyle: Ian Thorpe, AUS
    - Men's 100 m Backstroke: Aaron Peirsol, USA
    - Women's 100 m Backstroke: Natalie Coughlin, USA
    - Women's 100 m Breaststroke: Luo Xuejuan, CHN
  - Weightlifting:
    - Women's 58 kg: Chen Yanqing, CHN
    - Men's 62 kg: Zhiyong Shi, CHN
- Baseball: Chipper Jones of the Atlanta Braves hits his 300th career home run in a 5–4 victory over the San Diego Padres. AtlantaBraves.com
- Softball: Ninotska Amaro, her sister Alizabeth and Joselyn Steider combine to throw a perfect game, as team Puerto Rico beats the Red Mountain team from Mesa, Arizona, as part of the Senior League Softball World Series.
- Boxing: Former world Bantamweight champion Robert Quiroga, 35, is found murdered in his hometown of San Antonio, Texas.

== August 15, 2004 (Sunday) ==
- Michael Schumacher wins the Formula One Hungarian Grand Prix, securing the constructors' championship for Ferrari. Schumacher sets two driver records—12 victories in a season, and seven consecutive victories in a season. (ESPN.com)
- PGA Championship: Vijay Singh wins the PGA Championship in a three-hole playoff, defeating Justin Leonard and Chris DiMarco. Singh wins his second career championship in spite of failing to shoot a birdie during regulation play in the 4th round. (ESPN.com)
- NASCAR: Tony Stewart wins the Sirius at the Glen race in Watkins Glen, New York, despite suffering from leg and stomach cramps for most of the event. (ESPN.com)
- 2004 Summer Olympics
  - Olympic Basketball: The Puerto Rican National Basketball Team beats the United States, 92–73, recording only the third loss in Olympic competition for the U.S. team, and the first since NBA players were allowed to compete. (ESPN)
  - Argentina beats Serbia and Montenegro 83–82 after a last-second, off-the-floor basket by Manu Ginóbili, which provoked an angry outburst by Serbia-Montenegro's head coach. (ESPN)
  - Gold medal winners on day 2:
    - Cycling:
      - Women's Road race: Sara Carrigan, AUS
    - Fencing:
      - Women's Individual Épée: Tímea Nagy, HUN
    - Judo:
      - Women's 48–52 kg: Dongmei Xian, CHN
      - Men's 60–66 kg: Masato Uchishiba, JPN
    - Shooting:
      - Women's 10 m Air Pistol: Olena Kostevych, UKR
      - Men's Trap: Alexei Alipov, RUS
    - Swimming:
      - Women's 100 m Butterfly: Petria Thomas, AUS
      - Women's 400 m Freestyle: Laure Manaudou, FRA
      - Men's 100 m Breaststroke: Kosuke Kitajima, JPN
      - Men's 4 × 100 m Freestyle Relay: South Africa (Roland Mark Schoeman, Lyndon Ferns, Darian Townsend, Ryk Neethling)
    - Weightlifting:
      - Women's 53 kg: Udomporn Polsak, THA
      - Men's 56 kg: Halil Mutlu, TUR

== August 14, 2004 (Saturday) ==
- 2004 Summer Olympics: Gold medal winners on day 1:
  - Cycling:
    - Men's Road Race: Paolo Bettini, ITA
  - Diving:
    - Women's Synchronized 3m Springboard: Minxia Wu and Jingjing Guo, CHN
    - Men's Synchronized 10 m Platform: Tian Liang and Jinghui Yang, CHN
  - Fencing
    - Men's Individual Sabre: Aldo Montano, ITA
  - Judo
    - Women's Under 48 kg: Ryoko Tani, JPN
    - Men's Under 60 kg: Tadahiro Nomura, JPN
  - Shooting:
    - Women's 10 m Air Rifle: Li Du, CHN
    - Men's 10 m Air Pistol: Wang Yifu, CHN
  - Swimming
    - Men's 400 m Individual Medley: Michael Phelps, USA
    - Men's 400 m Freestyle: Ian Thorpe, AUS
    - Women's 400 m Individual Medley: Yana Klochkova, UKR
    - Women's 4 × 100 m Freestyle Relay: Australia (Alice Mills, Libby Lenton, Petria Thomas, Jodie Henry)
  - Weightlifting
    - Women's 48 kg: Nurcan Taylan, TUR
- Rugby union: In the fifth match of the Tri Nations Series, held at Ellis Park in Johannesburg, the Springboks (South Africa), behind a three-try effort by Marius Joubert, defeat the All Blacks (New Zealand) 40–26. This ends the All Blacks' chances of defending their Tri Nations crown, and sets up a winner-take-all showdown on 21 August between the Boks and the Wallabies (Australia) in Durban. (BBC)

== August 13, 2004 (Friday) ==
- The 2004 Olympic Games officially open in Athens(ESPN)
- Liverpool F.C. sell striker Michael Owen to Real Madrid for a fee of 12 million euros plus the midfielder Antonio Nunez.
- Sprinters Konstantinos Kenteris and Ekaterini Thanou are suspended from the Greek Olympic team after missing a compulsory doping test, and face possible expulsion from the games. (BBC)

== August 12, 2004 (Thursday) ==
- French footballer Zinedine Zidane, one of the most celebrated players of all time, announces his international retirement. (BBC)
- UEFA Cup 2004–05 Second qualifying round first leg:
  - FC Zeleznik 2 – 4 FC Steaua București
  - FK Dukla Banská Bystrica 3 – 1 FC Wil 1900
  - NK Zeljeznicar Sarajevo 1 – 2 PFC Litex Lovech
  - FC Nistru Otaci 1 – 2 SK Sigma Olomouc
  - FC Artmedia Bratislava 0 – 3 FC Dnipro Dnipropetrovsk
  - FC Tbilisi 0 – 1 Legia Warszawa
  - FC Illichivets Mariupol 0 – 0 FK Austria Wien
  - FC Metalurh Donetsk 3 – 0 FC Tiraspol
  - Glentoran F.C. 0 – 1 IF Elfsborg
  - Odd Grenland 3 – 1 FK Ekranas
  - FK Ventspils 0 – 0 Brøndby IF
  - Stabæk 3 – 1 FC Haka
  - Östers IF 2 – 2 FK Liepājas Metalurgs
  - Dinamo Zagreb 4 – 0 NK Primorje
  - SK Slavia Praha 3 – 1 Dinamo Tbilisi FC
  - Újpest FC 3 – 1 Servette FC
  - PFC Levski Sofia 5 – 0 FK Modriča
  - FC Oţelul Galaţi 0 – 0 FK Partizan
  - AEK Larnaca F.C. 3 – 0 Maccabi Petach Tikva FC
  - FC Terek Grozny 1 – 0 Lech Poznań
  - F.K. Bodø/Glimt 2 – 1 FC Levadia Tallinn
  - Fimleikafélag Hafnarfjarðar 2 – 2 Dunfermline Athletic F.C.
  - K.S.K.Beveren 3 – 1 FC Vaduz
  - Amica Wronki 1 – 0 Budapest Honvéd FC
  - Gençlerbirligi 1 – 0 NK Rijeka
  - SK Rapid Wien 0 – 2 FC Rubin Kazan
  - Hammarby IF 2 – 0 ÍA Akranes
  - Hapoel Bnei Sakhnin FC 3 – 0 KF Partizani Tirana
  - FK Zalgiris Vilnius 1 – 3 Aalborg Boldspilklub (UEFA)

== August 11, 2004 (Wednesday) ==
- UEFA Champions League 2004–05 Third qualifying round, first leg:
  - Shelbourne 0 – 0 Deportivo de La Coruña
  - Ferencváros 1 – 0 AC Sparta Praha
  - FC Shakhtar Donetsk 4 – 1 Club Brugge KV
  - FK Crvena Zvezda 3 – 2 PSV Eindhoven
  - Bayer Leverkusen 5 – 0 FC Baník Ostrava
  - FC Basel 1 – 1 Internazionale
  - NK Gorica 0 – 3 AS Monaco FC
  - Wisła Kraków 0 – 2 Real Madrid
  - Rosenborg 2 – 1 Maccabi Haifa F.C.
  - F.C. Dinamo București 1 – 2 Manchester United F.C. (UEFA)
- Tennis: Serena Williams withdraws from Olympic competition due to an injury to her knee. (NYT)

== August 10, 2004 (Tuesday) ==
- Kobe Bryant's accuser files a federal lawsuit against the Los Angeles Laker star, asking for $75,000 in compensatory damages and an undisclosed amount in punitive damages. Bryant's attorneys had no comment. (AP)
- Boston Celtic and former Los Angeles Lakers star Rick Fox divorces his wife of five years, movie star Vanessa Williams (ESPN)
- UEFA Champions League 2004–05 Third qualifying round, first leg:
  - PFC CSKA Moskva 2 – 1 Rangers F.C.
  - Dynamo Kyiv 1 – 2 Trabzonspor
  - S.L. Benfica 1 – 0 R.S.C. Anderlecht
  - Grazer AK 0 – 2 Liverpool F.C.
  - Juventus 2 – 2 Djurgårdens IF
  - PAOK 1 – 2 Maccabi Tel Aviv F.C. (UEFA)
    - (Match subsequently awarded 0 – 3 to Maccabi, because PAOK fielded an ineligible player – UEFA.com).
- UEFA Cup 2004–05 Second qualifying round first leg:
  - FK Budućnost Banatski Dvor 1 – 2 NK Maribor
  - SV Pasching 3 – 1 FC Zenit St Peterburg
  - AC Omonia 1 – 1 CSKA Sofia (UEFA)
- NFL:
  - New York Giants co-owner Robert Tisch announces he has inoperable brain cancer. (ESPN)
  - Anquan Boldin of the Arizona Cardinals, the NFL's 2003–04 offensive Rookie of the Year, is injured during practice. (ESPN)
- Tennis: Guillermo Coria and Jennifer Capriati pull out of the Olympic competition due to injuries; Lisa Raymond is announced as substitute to Capriati.(ESPN)
- Baseball: New York Mets pitcher Tom Glavine is hospitalized after being involved in a car collision; he lost two upper teeth and suffered injuries to his lips.(ESPN)

== August 9, 2004 (Monday) ==
- Baseball: Edgar Martínez announces that he will retire after the 2004 Major League Baseball season

== August 8, 2004 (Sunday) ==
- The United States basketball team defeats Turkey, 79–67, despite 11 3-point shots by Turkey. (Yahoo!)
- NFL: John Elway, Barry Sanders, Carl Eller and Bob Brown are officially inducted into the Pro Football Hall of Fame at Canton, Ohio. (ESPN/AP)
- NASCAR Nextel Cup: Jeff Gordon wins the Brickyard 400 for the fourth time in his career. (ESPN.com)
- ATP Masters Series: Andre Agassi wins the Cincinnati Masters for a third time, beating Lleyton Hewitt in the final to collect a record 17th ATP Masters Series title. ()

== August 7, 2004 (Saturday) ==
- Asian Cup 2004 soccer: Defending champions Japan defeat hosts China 3–1 in a controversial final which prompted a riot in Beijing. (Asian Cup Official Website)
- Baseball: Greg Maddux of the Chicago Cubs defeats the San Francisco Giants, 8–4 for his 300th career pitching victory.
- Boxing: Diego Corrales defeats Acelino Freitas by a tenth-round knockout, to win the WBO world lightweight title.(Boxing Central)
- Rugby union: In the fourth match of the Tri Nations Series, held in Sydney, the Wallabies (Australia) defeat the All Blacks (New Zealand) 23–18. The result throws the series wide open, with all three participants—the Wallabies, All Blacks, and Springboks (South Africa)—having a chance to win the series going into the final two matches in South Africa. (BBC)

== August 6, 2004 (Friday) ==
- Asian Cup 2004 soccer: In an exciting third-fourth playoff, Iran defeats Bahrain 4–2 with two late goals by Ali Daei in the last 10 minutes. Three players were red carded in the match, the most in any games of the Asian Cup. Asian Cup Official Website
- Bouncing back from their loss to Italy, the United States Dream Team basketball team defeats Serbia and Montenegro, the world champions, 78–60. (Yahoo!)

== August 4, 2004 (Wednesday) ==
- NFL: The Dallas Cowboys release quarterback Quincy Carter, who started all 16 games for the team last year. (NY Times) ESPN has reported that Carter tested positive for an illegal substance just before his release, and that he was in the NFL's substance abuse program.
- Baseball: The New York Yankees beat the Oakland Athletics, 8–6, with an eleventh inning home run hit by Alex Rodriguez, in a nationally televised game. (ESPN)
- Basketball: A three-pointer by Allen Iverson from near half-court with less than a second to go lifts the Dream Team 80–77 over Germany in a friendly game held in Cologne. German NBA superstar Dirk Nowitzki, who had tied the game with a three-pointer of his own seconds before Iverson's shot, led all scorers with 32 points. (ESPN)
- In a blockbuster trade, the Atlanta Hawks trade Jason Terry, Alan Henderson and a future first-round draft pick to the Dallas Mavericks for Antoine Walker and Tony Delk. (ESPN)
- The Detroit Pistons trade center Corliss Williamson to the Philadelphia 76ers for Derrick Coleman and Amal McCaskill. (ESPN)
- UEFA Champions League 2004–05 Second qualifying round, second leg (team progressing to next round in **bold**):
  - **AC Sparta Praha** 2 – 1 APOEL
  - **F.C. Dinamo București** 1 – 0 MŠK Žilina
  - **FK Crvena Zvezda** 3 – 0 BSC Young Boys
  - **Trabzonspor** 3 – 0 Skonto Riga
  - PFC Lokomotiv Plovdiv 0 – 4 **Club Brugge**
  - **Shelbourne** 2 – 0 HNK Hajduk Split
  - FBK Kaunas 0 – 2 **Djurgårdens IF**
  - FC Sheriff Tiraspol 0 – 2 **Rosenborg**

== August 3, 2004 (Tuesday) ==
- Asian Cup 2004: Hosts China thrill fans by defeating Iran in a penalty shootout 4–3. Iran missed their fourth and fifth shots. The game was tied 1–1 aet. In the other match, Bahrain ties Japan in a hard-fought match 3–3, with Japan only tying on the 90th minute of regulation play. Japan scores first in extra time, however, and keeps the score at 4–3 to win the game.
- Basketball: Team Italy upsets the United States' Dream Team, 95–78, during a friendly in Cologne, Germany. (ESPN)
- UEFA Champions League 2004–05 Second qualifying round, second leg (team progressing to next round in **bold**):
  - **Ferencváros** 0 – 1 SK Tirana (Ferencváros progress on the away goals rule).
  - **Wisła Kraków** 3 – 0 WIT Georgia Tbilisi
  - **PFC CSKA Moskva** 2 – 0 Neftchi
  - **Maccabi Tel Aviv F.C.** 1 – 0 HJK Helsinki
  - FC København 0 – 5 **NK Gorica**
  - **FC Shakhtar Donetsk** 1 – 0 Pyunik

== August 2, 2004 (Monday) ==
- Horse racing: The owners of Smarty Jones, the horse who gained popularity with his spirited pursuit of the Triple Crown, announce that he is forced to retire due to deep bruises in all four of his legs. Smarty was the first undefeated horse to win Kentucky Derby since Seattle Slew, in his retirement he will reside in the exact same stall that Slew retired to in Kentucky. (ESPN.com)
- National Football League: Running back Ricky Williams files paperwork officially declaring his retirement from the NFL at the age of 27. Williams, who rushed for 6,354 yards in his 5 NFL seasons for the New Orleans Saints and, most recently, the Miami Dolphins, told Miami he was leaving the team a week earlier. Because Williams is part of the NFL's substance abuse program, he is forbidden from playing in 2004 should he choose to unretire. (ESPN.com)

== August 1, 2004 (Sunday) ==
- Test cricket: England win the second Test match against the West Indies at Edgbaston by 256 runs. During the match Marcus Trescothick becomes the first batsman to score centuries in both innings of an Edgbaston Test. (BBC)
- Football (soccer): Mark Palios resigns as chief executive of the English Football Association. Both he and the England head coach Sven-Göran Eriksson have admitted affairs with the same woman: Faria Alam, an FA secretary. Palios does not admit any wrongdoing (he, Eriksson, and the secretary are all unmarried) but says he feels his action is necessary to help the Football Association return to normality. Eriksson is also under pressure to resign. (BBC)
