= Yanmin =

Yanmin is a female given name of Chinese origin. Notable people with the name include:

- Zhao Yanmin (born 1991), Chinese sprinter
- Bai Yanmin (born 1987), Chinese racewalker, in 2007 Asian Athletics Championships – Women's 20 kilometres walk
- Qiao Yanmin, Chinese judoka, see Judo at the 1993 East Asian Games
