= 2001 European Athletics U23 Championships – Women's 20 kilometres walk =

The women's 20 kilometres race walk event at the 2001 European Athletics U23 Championships was held in Amsterdam, Netherlands, on 15 July.

== Medalists ==
Gold	Elisa Rigaudo; Italy
Silver	Margarita Turava; Belarus
Bronze	Larissa Sofronova; Russia

== Results ==
=== Final ===
15 July

Rank	Name	Nationality	Time	Notes
1st place, gold medalist(s)	Elisa Rigaudo	Italy	1:29:54	CR
2nd place, silver medalist(s)	Margarita Turava	Belarus	1:30:15	
3rd place, bronze medalist(s)	Larissa Sofronova	Russia	1:32:06	
4	Tatyana Sibileva	Russia	1:32:23	
5	Sylwia Korzeniowska	Poland	1:32:47	
6	Athina Papagianni	Greece	1:33:37	
7	Anne Haaland Simonsen	Norway	1:34:26	
8	Jolanta Dukure	Latvia	1:34:26	
9	Daniela Cârlan	Romania	1:34:41	
10	Inês Henriques	Portugal	1:34:49	
11	Joanna Baj	Poland	1:34:56	
12	Vera Santos	Portugal	1:35:51	
13	Heidi Lindewall	Finland	1:38:38	
14	Rosa Mantecón	Spain	1:39:04	
15	Agnieszka Olesz	Poland	1:40:01	
16	Mária Gáliková	Slovakia	1:41:10	
17	Marie Polli	Switzerland	1:41:29	
18	Fabienne Chanfreau	France	1:47:31	
	Tiina Muinonen	Finland	DQ	

== Participation ==
According to an unofficial count, 19 athletes from 14 countries participated in the event.

- Belarus (1)
- Finland (2)
- France (1)
- Greece (1)
- Italy (1)
- Latvia (1)
- Norway (1)
- Poland (3)
- Portugal (2)
- Romania (1)
- Russia (2)
- Slovakia (1)
- Spain (1)
- Switzerland (1)
