= 2003 European Athletics U23 Championships – Women's 20 kilometres walk =

The women's 20 kilometres race walk event at the 2003 European Athletics U23 Championships was held in Bydgoszcz, Poland, on 18 July.

== Medalists ==
Gold	Athanasia Tsoumeleka; Greece
Silver	Vera Santos; Portugal
Bronze	Sabine Zimmer; Germany

== Results ==
=== Final ===
18 July

Rank	Name	Nationality	Time	Notes
1st place, gold medalist(s)	Athanasia Tsoumeleka	Greece	1:33:55	
2nd place, silver medalist(s)	Vera Santos	Portugal	1:35:18	
3rd place, bronze medalist(s)	Sabine Zimmer	Germany	1:35:56	
4	Beatriz Pascual	Spain	1:37:28	
5	Lyudmila Yefimkina	Russia	1:38:47	
6	Barbora Dibelková	Czech Republic	1:39:22	
7	Zuzana Malíková	Slovakia	1:44:03	
8	Tatsiana Zuyeva	Belarus	1:44:34	
9	Elżbieta Nieckarz	Poland	1:46:51	
10	Edina Füsti	Hungary	1:48:08	
	Anna Szumny	Poland	DNF	
	Katsiaryna Labashova	Belarus	DQ	

== Participation ==
According to an unofficial count, 12 athletes from 10 countries participated in the event.

- Belarus (2)
- Czech Republic (1)
- Germany (1)
- Greece (1)
- Hungary (1)
- Poland (2)
- Portugal (1)
- Russia (1)
- Slovakia (1)
- Spain (1)
