= Jiang Qiuyan =

Chinese racewalker (born 1983)

Medal record

Women's athletics

Representing China

Asian Championships
Gold medal – first place	2007 Amman	20 km walk

Jiang Qiuyan (born 14 March 1983) is a Chinese race walker.

== Achievements ==
Year	Competition	Venue	Position	Event	Notes
Representing China
2005	Universiade	İzmir, Turkey	1st	20 km	1:33:13
2006	World Race Walking Cup	A Coruña, Spain	9th	20 km	1:29:08
2007	Asian Championships	Amman, Jordan	1st	20 km	1:36:15.9
2007	Universiade	Bangkok, Thailand	1st	20 km	1:35:22
