= October 2004 in sports =

<<	October 2004					>>
Su	Mo	Tu	We	Th	Fr	Sa
					1	2
3	4	5	6	7	8	9
10	11	12	13	14	15	16
17	18	19	20	21	22	23
24	25	26	27	28	29	30
31
Sports

This list shows notable sports-related deaths, events, and outcomes that occurred in October of 2004.

== Deaths ==
- 28 Jimmy McLarnin
- 27 Paulo Sérgio de Oliveira Silva (a.k.a. Serginho)
- 26 Beto Ávila
- 24 Ricky Hendrick
- 23 Bill Nicholson
- 17 Ray Boone
- 11 Keith Miller
- 10 Ken Caminiti
- 2 Bolat Kesikhbaev

== October 31, 2004 (Sunday) ==
- National Football League, Week 8:
  - The Pittsburgh Steelers behind rookie quarterback Ben Roethlisberger, defeat the New England Patriots, 34–20, ending the Patriots' win streak at 21 games. It is the first time in over a year that the Patriots have lost a game. (ESPN)
  - The Philadelphia Eagles remain the only undefeated team in the NFL after defeating the Baltimore Ravens, 15–10. Terrell Owens had the Eagles' only touchdown. (ESPN)
  - The New York Giants defeat the Minnesota Vikings, 34–13. Vikings' wide receiver Randy Moss left the game early with continued tightness in his right hamstring. The Vikings were nearly shutout at home for the first time in over 40 years before scoring two touchdowns late in the fourth quarter. (ESPN)
- NASCAR: Just a week after a plane crash killed ten people including members of Hendrick Motorsports and team owner Rick Hendrick's family, team driver Jimmie Johnson wins his seventh race of the season (and third straight) at the Bass Pro Shops MBNA 500. (ESPN)

== October 30, 2004 (Saturday) ==
- Rugby league Tri-Nations: Australia defeat Great Britain 12–8 at the City of Manchester Stadium and qualify for the Tri-Nations Final, where they will play either New Zealand or Great Britain, depending on results over the next three weeks.

== October 29, 2004 (Friday) ==
- Football: English Premiership club Chelsea cancels the contract of Romanian international striker Adrian Mutu after he tests positive for cocaine. (BBC)

== October 27, 2004 (Wednesday) ==
- Baseball: The Boston Red Sox break the alleged Curse of the Bambino, by winning their first World Series title since 1918, beating the St. Louis Cardinals, 3–0, in Game Four of the 2004 World Series.

== October 26, 2004 (Tuesday) ==
- Baseball – 2004 World Series, Game 3: Manny Ramírez homers and Pedro Martínez pitches seven shutout innings as the Boston Red Sox defeat the St. Louis Cardinals 4–1 to take a 3–0 series lead. The only team to come back from a 3–0 deficit to win a best-of-7 series in Major League Baseball history was these very same Red Sox, last week in the ALCS. (CNNSI)
- Football (soccer): FA Premier League club West Bromwich Albion announce they have severed ties with manager Gary Megson after Megson informs the club he will not extend his contract with them beyond the 2004–05 season. (Reuters)

== October 25, 2004 (Monday) ==
- Ice skating – Russian ice skater Tatiana Totmianina is released from a Pittsburgh area hospital, after being admitted days earlier, with a head concussion suffered after a fall during a competition. (Boston.com)
- National Football League Week 7, Monday Night Football: In their first MNF appearance in over a decade, the Cincinnati Bengals upset the AFC West division-leading Denver Broncos 23–10. It had also been fourteen years since their last MNF win and fifteen since their first Monday night home game. (ESPN)

== October 24, 2004 (Sunday) ==
- Baseball – 2004 World Series, Game 2: The Boston Red Sox achieve another home-field victory over the St. Louis Cardinals 6 to 2. Red Sox pitcher Curt Schilling earns another win playing through his ankle injury, despite Boston committing four errors. Games 3 through 5 are slated to be held in St. Louis starting Tuesday. (CNNSI)
- Cross-country skiing: World Cup 2005 season opening in Düsseldorf, Germany: The Ladies' 6×0.8 km Team Sprint relay race is won by the Norwegian No. 1 team (Marit Bjørgen, Hilde G. Pedersen), with Germany's No. 2 team (Manuela Henkel, Evi Sachenbacher) and Italy's No. 1 team (Arianna Follis, Gabriella Paruzzi) taking the 2nd and 3rd place. (FIS-Ski Results) In the Men's 6×1.5 km race, Norway's No. 1 team wins (Håvard Bjerkeli, Tor Arne Hetland), while Germany's No. 1 team (Tobias Angerer, Axel Teichmann) and No. 3 team (Toni Lang, Andreas Stitzl) finish 2nd and 3rd, respectively. (FIS-Ski Results)
- Football (soccer): Manchester United defeat Arsenal 2–0 at United's Old Trafford stadium in Manchester, ending the London club's unbeaten streak in the FA Premier League. Arsenal's unbeaten run had stretched a record 49 matches and included the entire 2003–04 season. (BBC)
- Formula One: In the Brazilian Grand Prix, the last race of the 2004 season, Juan Pablo Montoya wins his final race for the Williams team, holding off future McLaren teammate Kimi Räikkönen. Rubens Barrichello finishes third. Michael Schumacher, who had long since clinched his seventh series championship, finishes seventh. (BBC)
- National Football League Week 7:
  - The Kansas City Chiefs, in a 56–10 romp over the Atlanta Falcons, set an NFL record for most rushing touchdowns in a game, with 8. Four were scored by Priest Holmes and four by Derrick Blaylock. (Yahoo!)
  - The New England Patriots set another NFL record with their 18th consecutive regular-season victory, 13–7 over the New York Jets. The loss is the first of the year for the Jets, while the Patriots remain undefeated. Jets running back Curtis Martin moves into seventh place on the all-time career rushing yards list. (Yahoo!)
  - The Philadelphia Eagles also remain undefeated with a 34–31 overtime win over the Cleveland Browns. (Yahoo!)
  - The Miami Dolphins stun the St. Louis Rams 31–14 for their first win of the season. (Yahoo!)
  - The Jacksonville Jaguars stun the Indianapolis Colts 27–24 on a last minute 50-yard field goal from Josh Scobee. (Yahoo!)
  - Deion Sanders has his first interception return for a touchdown since 1998 as his Baltimore Ravens beat the Buffalo Bills 20–6. (Yahoo!)
  - Emmitt Smith rushed for 100 yards for the 78th time in his career, surpassing Walter Payton en route to a 25–17 Arizona Cardinals victory over the Seattle Seahawks. (ESPN)
- NASCAR: Jimmie Johnson's sixth win of the 2004 NASCAR season, at the Subway 500 at Martinsville Speedway near Martinsville, Virginia, is overshadowed by the crash of a private plane today belonging to his racing team, Hendrick Motorsports. (ESPN) All 10 people on board the plane were killed, including four relatives of team owner Rick Hendrick. (ESPN)
- Ice skating: During an ABC televised competition, skater Tatiana Totmianina suffers a fall after her partner slipped off his right foot. She remains unconscious for some minutes, and is hospitalized with damage to her head, neck and eyes.

== October 23, 2004 (Saturday) ==
- Baseball: 2004 World Series, Game 1: Hosting the St. Louis Cardinals on a cold night at Fenway Park, the Boston Red Sox won the highest scoring Game One of Series history, 11–9. The Red Sox took a 7–2 lead in the third inning, but the Cardinals tied it by the 7th. Mark Bellhorn's two-run home run in the bottom of the 8th provided the winning margin. (ESPN)
- Cross-country skiing: World Cup 2005 season opening in Düsseldorf, Germany: The 0.8 km Ladies' Sprint race is won by Marit Bjørgen (NOR), with Anna Dahlberg (SWE) and Gabriella Paruzzi coming in second and third. (FIS-Ski results) The 1.5 km Men's Sprint race is won by Peter Larsson (SWE), with Tor Arne Hetland (NOR) and Cristian Zorzi (ITA) coming in second and third. (FIS-Ski results)
- Rugby league Tri-Nations: Australia defeat New Zealand 32–12 at Loftus Road, London.

== October 21, 2004 (Thursday) ==
- Baseball:
  - National League Championship Series, Game 7: The St. Louis Cardinals advance to the World Series with a 5–2 win over the Houston Astros. In the sixth inning, Albert Pujols ties the game with an RBI double, and Scott Rolen gives the Cardinals the lead for good with a two-run homer on the next pitch. Pujols is named Series MVP. (ESPN)
- Basketball: Denver Nuggets guard Carmelo Anthony is cited for possession of marijuana. (ESPN)(TheDenverChannel.com)
- Football: UEFA Cup 2004–05 Group Stage, matchday 1 (UEFA.com):
- Group A:
  - Feyenoord 3 – 0 Hearts
  - Schalke 1 – 1 FC Basel
- Group B:
  - Athletic Bilbao 2 – 0 Parma
  - Steaua Bucharest 2 – 0 Standard Liège
- Group C:
  - Real Zaragoza 2 – 0 FC Utrecht
  - Dnipro Dnipropetrovsk 3 – 2 Club Brugge
- Group D:
  - Panionios 0 – 1 Newcastle United
  - Dinamo Tbilisi 0 – 2 Sochaux
- Group E:
  - Egaleo 0 – 1 Middlesbrough
  - Lazio 1 – 1 Villarreal
- Group F:
  - Auxerre 0 – 0 GAK
  - Amica Wronki 0 – 5 Rangers
- Group G:
  - Beveren 1 – 5 VfB Stuttgart
  - Benfica 4 – 2 Heerenveen
- Group H:
  - Alemannia 1 – 0 Lille
  - Zenit St. Petersburg 5 – 1 AEK Athens
- Olympics: A three-judge panel of the Court of Arbitration for Sport upholds the awarding of the gold medal in the gymnastics men's all-around to American Paul Hamm, rejecting the appeal of South Korean Yang Tae-young. (ESPN)

== October 20, 2004 (Wednesday) ==
- Baseball:
  - National League Championship Series, Game 6: The St. Louis Cardinals come back to beat the Houston Astros 6–4. Jim Edmonds drives in the winning runs with a walk-off home run in the bottom of the twelfth. This series is all tied up at 3–3 and the stage is set for a dramatic Game 7 in St. Louis on October 21. (ESPN)
  - American League Championship Series, Game 7: The Boston Red Sox defeat the New York Yankees, 10–3, going on to the World Series for the first time since 1986. The Red Sox won four games in a row, winning the series 4–3. They become the first team in Major League Baseball, and the third team in North American professional sports, to win a postseason series after trailing three games to none. (ESPN) (TheBostonChannel.com) (Reuters)
- Football: UEFA Champions League, Group Stage, Matchday 3
  - Group E: Panathinaikos 2 – 2 Arsenal
  - Group E: Rosenborg 1 – 2 PSV
  - Group F: A.C. Milan 1 – 0 FC Barcelona
  - Group F: Shakhtar Donetsk 3 – 0 Celtic
  - Group G: Anderlecht 1 – 2 Werder Bremen
  - Group G: Valencia 1 – 5 Inter Milan
  - Group H: Chelsea 2 – 0 CSKA Moscow
  - Group H: Paris Saint-Germain 2 – 0 F.C. Porto (UEFA.com)
- Women's boxing: Laila Ali denies rumors she will be fighting in Kinshasa, DR Congo on October 30, the 30th anniversary of her father's legendary fight against George Foreman in the same city. (ESPN)

== October 19, 2004 (Tuesday) ==
- Baseball:
  - American League Championship Series, Game 6: The Boston Red Sox defeat the New York Yankees, 4–2, becoming the first team in Major League Baseball history to force a Game 7 in any postseason series after being down 3 games to 0. Curt Schilling pitches seven innings on a hurt ankle, giving up only one run on four hits. (ESPN)
- Football: UEFA Champions League, Group Stage, Matchday 3
  - Group A: Liverpool 0 – 0 Deportivo La Coruña
  - Group A: AS Monaco 2 – 1 Olympiacos
  - Group B: Bayer Leverkusen 3 – 1 AS Roma
  - Group B: Real Madrid 1 – 0 Dynamo Kyiv
  - Group C: Ajax 3 – 0 Maccabi Tel Aviv
  - Group C: Juventus 1 – 0 Bayern Munich
  - Group D: Fenerbahçe 1 – 3 Olympique Lyonnais
  - Group D: Sparta Prague 0 – 0 Manchester United (UEFA.com)

== October 18, 2004 (Monday) ==
- Baseball:
  - American League Championship Series, Game 5: The Boston Red Sox outlast the New York Yankees to win 5–4 in a 14 inning marathon. David Ortiz is a hero once again with the game-winning RBI, driving in Johnny Damon. New York now leads the best-of-seven series 3–2. The game lasted 5 hours and 49 minutes, the longest by time in postseason history. (ESPN)
  - National League Championship Series, Game 5: The Houston Astros defeat the St. Louis Cardinals 3–0. Jeff Kent drives in the winning runs with a walk-off home run in the bottom of the ninth. Houston leads the best-of-seven series 3–2. (ESPN)
- National Football League Week 6, Monday Night Football: Spurred by a 93-yard fumble return by Adam Archuleta, the St. Louis Rams defeat the Tampa Bay Buccaneers 28–21. (ESPN)

== October 17, 2004 (Sunday) ==
- Baseball:
  - American League Championship Series, Game 4: The Boston Red Sox stay alive in the series with the New York Yankees with a 6–4 win in 12 innings. The Sox, who now trail 3–1 in the series, tie the game in the bottom of the ninth against Yankees closer Mariano Rivera, and win on a walk-off home run by David Ortiz in the 12th. (ESPN)
  - National League Championship Series, Game 4: The Houston Astros even the series with the St. Louis Cardinals at two games apiece with a 6–5 win. Carlos Beltrán supplies the winning margin with a solo home run in the seventh inning. Beltrán ties records for the most home runs in a single postseason (eight) and most consecutive postseason games with a home run (five). (ESPN)
- National Football League Week 6:
  - The New England Patriots, Philadelphia Eagles and New York Jets remain the NFL's only undefeated teams, by beating the Seattle Seahawks, Carolina Panthers and San Francisco 49ers respectively. New England's win tied an NFL record for consecutive regular-season victories, at 17, and continues their record of most consecutive NFL games won (including playoffs) to 20. (Yahoo!/AP)
  - The Buffalo Bills get their first win of the year by beating the Miami Dolphins 20–13. The Dolphins, at 0–6, are the NFL's last winless team in 2004.
  - Minnesota Vikings quarterback Daunte Culpepper throws five touchdowns for the third time this season, setting an NFL record. The Vikings defeated the New Orleans Saints 38–31. (Yahoo!)
- Motorcycle racing: Valentino Rossi wins the World MotoGP title for the third successive year, the first year for Yamaha since 1992, when he wins the Australian MotoGP, one race before the end of the series. He is only the second rider to win successive titles for different teams. (BBC), (BBC).
- Golf: Ernie Els wins the Volvo World Match Play Championship at Wentworth, beating Lee Westwood 2 and 1. It's a record sixth title for Els, and the third in a row. (BBC)

== October 16, 2004 (Saturday) ==
- Baseball:
  - National League Championship Series, Game 3: The Houston Astros defeat the St. Louis Cardinals 5–2 behind home runs by Jeff Kent, Carlos Beltrán, and Lance Berkman. Roger Clemens pitches seven innings for the win, which leaves the Astros trailing 2–1 in the series. (ESPN)
  - American League Championship Series, Game 3: The New York Yankees take a 3–0 series lead over the Boston Red Sox, pounding out 22 hits in a 19–8 win. Hideki Matsui and Alex Rodriguez each score five runs, and Matsui also drives in five runs. (ESPN)
- Rugby league:
  - Australia and New Zealand draw 16–16 in the opening game of the Tri-Nations at the North Harbour Stadium in Auckland. (BBC)
  - Leeds Rhinos defeat Bradford Bulls 16–8 in the Grand Final of Super League IX at Old Trafford, to win their first league championship for 32 years. (BBC)
- Snooker: During the second round of qualifying for the UK Championship, Jamie Burnett achieves a break of 148 against Leo Fernandez, the first time a player has made a break higher than the nominal maximum of 147 in a professional match. (BBC)

== October 15, 2004 (Friday) ==
- NBA pre-season: In the first NBA game ever played in China, the Houston Rockets defeat the Sacramento Kings, 88–86, despite a half court shot made by the Kings' Chris Webber at the end of the third quarter.
- Baseball: Game 3 of the American League Championship Series between the New York Yankees and Boston Red Sox is postponed due to rain at Fenway Park. Games on Saturday, October 16 and Sunday, October 17 will be played as scheduled, and a make-up game will be played if necessary on Monday, October 18. The Yankees lead the series 2 games to 0.

== October 14, 2004 (Thursday) ==
- Baseball:
  - National League Championship Series, Game 2: The St. Louis Cardinals beat the Houston Astros 6–4 and take a 2–0 lead in the series. The Cardinals break a 4–4 tie in the bottom of the eighth inning with back-to-back home runs from Albert Pujols and Scott Rolen; Rolen also hit a game-tying homer in the fifth inning. (ESPN)
- Football:
  - FIFA World Cup Asian Qualifying
    - Chinese Taipei 0 – 1 Palestine
  - FIFA World Cup South American Qualifying
    - Venezuela 3 – 1 Ecuador

(FIFAWorldCup.Yahoo.com). Next matchday: 17 November.

- NBA pre-season: The Washington Wizards defeat the Charlotte Bobcats, 128–126 in double overtime, despite Jason Hart's game tying three-point shot with one second to go in the first overtime.

== October 13, 2004 (Wednesday) ==
- Baseball:
  - American League Championship Series, Game 2: The New York Yankees take a 2–0 lead over the Boston Red Sox. In a 3–1 win, Jon Lieber outpitches Red Sox star Pedro Martínez. John Olerud hits a two-run homer for the Yankees. (ESPN)
  - National League Championship Series, Game 1: In the series opener, the St. Louis Cardinals break open a 4–4 game with six runs in the bottom of the sixth inning, and hold on for a 10–7 win over the Houston Astros. (ESPN)
- Football:
  - FIFA World Cup Asian Qualifying
    - Qatar 2 – 3 Iran
    - Thailand 3 – 0 United Arab Emirates
    - Singapore 2 – 0 India
    - Hong Kong 2 – 0 Malaysia
    - Tajikistan 2 – 1 Kyrgyzstan
    - Kuwait 1 – 0 China PR
    - Oman 0 – 1 Japan
    - Maldives 3 – 0 Vietnam
    - North Korea 2 – 1 Yemen
    - Iraq 1 – 2 Uzbekistan
    - Laos 2 – 3 Jordan
    - Syria 2 – 2 Bahrain
    - Lebanon 1 – 1 South Korea
    - Uzbekistan, Japan, North Korea, and Saudi Arabia clinch first place in their group, and advance to Stage 3.
  - FIFA World Cup European Qualifying
    - Italy 4 – 3 Belarus
    - Netherlands 3 – 1 Finland
    - Luxembourg 0 – 4 Liechtenstein
    - Armenia 0 – 3 Czech Republic
    - Moldova 1 – 1 Scotland
    - Lithuania 0 – 0 Spain
    - Serbia and Montenegro 5 – 0 San Marino
    - Cyprus 0 – 2 France
    - Azerbaijan 0 – 1 England
    - Portugal 7 – 1 Russia
    - Latvia 2 – 2 Estonia
    - Kazakhstan 0 – 1 Albania
    - Iceland 1 – 4 Sweden
    - Bulgaria 4 – 1 Malta
    - Andorra 1 – 0 Macedonia
    - Ukraine 2 – 0 Georgia
    - Norway 3 – 0 Slovenia
    - Republic of Ireland 2 – 0 Faroe Islands
    - Denmark 1 – 1 Turkey
    - Wales 2 – 3 Poland
    - Northern Ireland 3 – 3 Austria
  - FIFA World Cup South American Qualifying
    - Paraguay 1 – 1 Peru
    - Chile 0 – 0 Argentina
    - Brazil 0 – 0 Colombia
  - FIFA World Cup CONCACAF Qualifying
    - Guatemala 1 – 0 Honduras
    - Mexico 3 – 0 Trinidad and Tobago
    - St. Kitts and Nevis 0 – 3 St. Vincent / Grenadines
    - Canada 1 – 3 Costa Rica
    - Jamaica 0 – 0 El Salvador
    - USA 6 – 0 Panama
    - United States, Guatemala and Mexico clinch places in the final stage of qualifying.
    - (FIFAWorldCup.Yahoo.com)

== October 12, 2004 (Tuesday) ==
- Baseball
  - American League Championship Series Game 1: Mike Mussina of the New York Yankees has his perfect game broken up in the 7th inning, and the Boston Red Sox rally to within 8–7, but the Yankees win 10–7 to take a 1–0 series lead. Mariano Rivera, who attended the funeral of two members of his wife's family in Panama earlier in the day, returns in time to record the save. Red Sox key starting pitcher Curt Schilling is markedly off his game, due to an ankle injury which was aggravated during the ALDS. (ESPN)
- Basketball
  - WNBA Finals: The Seattle Storm defeat the Connecticut Sun 74–60 behind 23 points from Betty Lennox. The Storm won the best-of-three series 2–1, and Lennox was named Finals Most Valuable Player. Storm coach Anne Donovan becomes the first woman to coach a WNBA champion. (ESPN)
- Football:
  - FIFA World Cup South American Qualifying
    - Bolivia 0 – 0 Uruguay
  - FIFA World Cup Asian Qualifying
    - Indonesia 1 – 3 Saudi Arabia (FIFAWorldCup.Yahoo.com)

== October 11, 2004 (Monday) ==
- Baseball:
  - National League Division Series: The Houston Astros win a postseason series for the first time in the franchise's 43-year history, crushing the Atlanta Braves 12–3 in the fifth and deciding game of their series. Carlos Beltrán leads the Astros' offense with two home runs. (ESPN)
- National Football League Week 5, Monday Night Football: Tennessee Titans quarterback Steve McNair completes 15 of 26 passes for 206 yards as the Titans give the Green Bay Packers their third consecutive home loss 48–27.

== October 10, 2004 (Sunday) ==
- Formula One: In a dominating performance, Michael Schumacher wins his 13th race of the season at the Japanese Grand Prix. His brother Ralf holds off Jenson Button for second. (BBC)
- Baseball:
  - National League Division Series:
    - The Atlanta Braves even their series with the Houston Astros at two games apiece, ending the Astros' 19-game home winning streak with a 6–5 win. Rafael Furcal scores the winning run in the ninth on a single from J. D. Drew. (ESPN)
    - The St. Louis Cardinals win their series against the Los Angeles Dodgers, 3 games to 1, with a 6–2 win. Albert Pujols breaks open a 2–2 game with a three-run homer in the fourth inning. (ESPN)
  - New York Yankees closer Mariano Rivera returns to Panama City, Panama after two relatives of his wife were electrocuted while cleaning the swimming pool at his home there. (ESPN)
  - 1996 National League Most Valuable Player Ken Caminiti dies of a heart attack at age 41. (KGTV via Yahoo!)
- National Football League Week 5:
  - The New England Patriots set a record for the number of consecutive NFL games ever won, at 19, after beating the Miami Dolphins 24–10.
  - The Seattle Seahawks take their first loss of the season, against the St. Louis Rams. St. Louis scores 17 points in the final six minutes of regulation to tie the Seahawks, and go on to beat the Seahawks 33–27 in overtime.
  - The Atlanta Falcons also take their first loss, to the Detroit Lions. The San Francisco 49ers get their first win by beating the Arizona Cardinals in overtime.
- Marathon: Eurasia Marathon: David Kiptanui, (26) from Kenya wins in 2:18:19 before Konstantin Permitin (Константин Пермитин), (36) of Russia (2:18:25) and Yuriy Hychun, (27) from Ukraine (2:18:35). In the women's category, Russian Svetlana Demidenko (Светлана Демиденко), (28) wins in 2:36:44 before her compatriots Zhanna Malkova (Жанна Малкова), (36) in 2:39:36 and Olga Glok (Ольга Глок), (21) in 2:42:45. (Istanbul Marathon)
- WNBA: The Seattle Storm even their best-of-three championship series with the Connecticut Sun at one game apiece, winning 67–65. The Sun's Nykesha Sales sets a WNBA Finals record with 32 points, but misses a three-pointer at the buzzer that would have won the game. Betty Lennox leads the Storm with 27 points; Lauren Jackson racks up a double-double with 15 points and 11 rebounds. (ESPN)
- Football:
  - FIFA World Cup South American Qualifying
    - Ecuador 2 – 0 Chile
  - FIFA World Cup African Qualifying
    - Guinea 1 – 1 Morocco
    - Uganda 0 – 1 South Africa
    - Togo 1 – 0 Mali
    - Benin 0 – 1 Ivory Coast
    - Liberia 0 – 1 Senegal
    - Angola 1 – 0 Zimbabwe
    - Congo 2 – 3 Zambia
    - Ghana 0 – 0 Congo DR
  - FIFA World Cup North / Central American & Caribbean Qualifying
    - St Vincent & the Grenadines 0 – 1 Mexico
    - Trinidad and Tobago 5 – 1 Saint Kitts and Nevis (FIFAWorldCup.Yahoo.com)

== October 9, 2004 (Saturday) ==
- Baseball:
  - American League Division Series:
    - The New York Yankees win their series against the Minnesota Twins, 3 games to 1, with a 6–5 win in 10 innings. The Yankees come back from a 5–1 deficit with four runs in the eighth inning, capped by a three-run home run from Rubén Sierra. In the top of the 10th inning, Alex Rodriguez scores the winning run on a wild pitch. (ESPN)
  - National League Division Series:
    - The Los Angeles Dodgers stay alive in their series against the St. Louis Cardinals, winning 4–0 behind a complete-game shutout by José Lima. The Dodgers, who now trail 2 games to 1 in the series, get their runs via a two-run double from Steve Finley and two solo homers from Shawn Green. (ESPN)
    - The Houston Astros win their 19th consecutive home game to take a 2 games to 1 series lead over the Atlanta Braves, winning 8–5. The Astros' offense is sparked by Carlos Beltrán, who goes 2-for-5 with a two-run homer. (ESPN)
- Football:
  - FIFA World Cup European Qualifying
    - Macedonia 2 – 2 Netherlands
    - Czech Republic 1 – 0 Romania
    - Finland 3 – 1 Armenia
    - Albania 0 – 2 Denmark
    - Turkey 4 – 0 Kazakhstan
    - Ukraine 1 – 1 Greece
    - Liechtenstein 2 – 2 Portugal
    - Slovakia 4 – 1 Latvia
    - Luxembourg 0 – 4 Russia
    - France 0 – 0 Rep of Ireland
    - Israel 2 – 2 Switzerland
    - Cyprus 2 – 2 Faroe Islands
    - Slovenia 1 – 0 Italy
    - Belarus 4 – 0 Moldova
    - Scotland 0 – 1 Norway
    - Austria 1 – 3 Poland
    - Azerbaijan 0 – 0 Northern Ireland
    - England 2 – 0 Wales
    - Spain 2 – 0 Belgium
    - Bosnia Herzegovina 0 – 0 Serbia and Montenegro
    - Croatia 2 – 2 Bulgaria
    - Malta 0 – 0 Iceland
    - Sweden 3 – 0 Hungary
  - FIFA World Cup South American Qualifying
    - Venezuela 2 – 5 Brazil
    - Colombia 1 – 1 Paraguay
    - Bolivia 1 – 0 Peru
    - Argentina 4 – 2 Uruguay
  - FIFA World Cup African Qualifying
    - Sudan 1 – 1 Cameroon
    - Gabon 1 – 1 Nigeria
    - Cape Verde 1 – 0 Burkina Faso
    - Rwanda 1 – 1 Algeria
    - Botswana 2 – 1 Kenya
    - Malawi 2 – 2 Tunisia
  - FIFA World Cup North / Central American & Caribbean Qualifying
    - Panama 1 – 1 Jamaica
    - Costa Rica 5 – 0 Guatemala
    - El Salvador 0 – 2 USA
    - Honduras 1 – 1 Canada
  - FIFA World Cup Asian Qualifying
    - Sri Lanka 2 – 2 Turkmenistan (FIFAWorldCup.Yahoo.com)

== October 8, 2004 (Friday) ==
- Baseball: American League Division Series
  - The Boston Red Sox complete a three-game sweep of the Anaheim Angels. The Red Sox take a 6–1 lead after six innings, but the Angels even the game with five runs in the seventh, punctuated by a grand slam from Vladimir Guerrero. The game goes into extra innings; in the bottom of the 10th inning, David Ortiz hits a two-run walk-off home run to win the game 8–6, ending the series. (ESPN)
  - The New York Yankees take a 2–1 lead in their series against the Minnesota Twins with an 8–4 win. The Yankees erase an early 1–0 Twins lead with three runs on four consecutive two-out singles in the second inning, and later add home runs from Bernie Williams and Hideki Matsui. Kevin Brown pitches six innings for the win. (ESPN)
- NFL: The league announces that Jamal Lewis, who pleaded guilty yesterday to trying to set up a cocaine deal in 2000, will be suspended for two games without pay, and in addition will be fined two weeks' salary. This action will cost Lewis approximately US$760,000. (ESPN)
- WNBA:
  - In the first game of the best-of-three championship series, the Connecticut Sun beat the Seattle Storm 68–64. Sun rookie Lindsay Whalen barely misses a double-double, scoring 11 points and dishing out nine assists. Katie Douglas leads the Sun with 18 points. The Storm are led by Betty Lennox with 17 points and Lauren Jackson with 16. (ESPN)
  - Los Angeles Sparks center Lisa Leslie is named the league's MVP for the second time. (ESPN) The All-WNBA team is also named; Leslie is joined on the first team by:
    - Lauren Jackson, Seattle Storm
    - Tina Thompson, Houston Comets
    - Sue Bird, Seattle Storm
    - Diana Taurasi, Phoenix Mercury
- Football:
  - FIFA World Cup African Qualifying
    - Libya 2 – 1 Egypt (FIFAWorldCup.Yahoo.com)

== October 7, 2004 (Thursday) ==
- Baseball: National League Division Series
  - The Atlanta Braves even their series with the Houston Astros 4–2 in 11 innings. Braves shortstop Rafael Furcal hits a game-winning walk-off home run in the bottom of the 11th inning to even the series at one game apiece.
  - The St. Louis Cardinals take a 2–0 lead in their series against the Los Angeles Dodgers, winning by the same 8–3 score as in Game 1.
- NFL: Baltimore Ravens star running back Jamal Lewis, who was scheduled to go on trial on federal charges of conspiracy to deal cocaine, pleads guilty to a lesser charge of using a cellular phone to set up a drug deal. Under the plea agreement, Lewis will serve four months in a federal prison and two months in a halfway house after the end of the 2004 NFL season. (ESPN)

== October 6, 2004 (Wednesday) ==
- Baseball:
  - The Houston Astros open their National League Division Series matchup with the Atlanta Braves 8–3. In the later games, the New York Yankees needed 12 innings to defeat the Minnesota Twins 7–6 to even their series at one game apiece and the Boston Red Sox defeat the Anaheim Angels 4–3 and take a 2 games to 0 lead.
  - Sammy Sosa is fined US$87,400 for arriving late to the Chicago Cubs final game of the regular season and for leaving the game early. (ESPN)
- Football:
  - FIFA World Cup North / Central American & Caribbean Qualifying
    - Mexico 7 – 0 St Vincent & the Grenadines (FIFAWorldCup.Yahoo.com)

== October 5, 2004 (Tuesday) ==
- Baseball: The St. Louis Cardinals beat the Los Angeles Dodgers 8–3 in the first game of a best-of-five National League Division Series, while the Boston Red Sox defeat the Anaheim Angels 9–3, and the Minnesota Twins defeat the New York Yankees 2–0, in the opening game of their respective American League Division Series. The Twins break a post-season record with 5 double plays and the Cardinals break an NLDS record with 5 home runs.
- Football: The draw for the group stage of the 2005 UEFA Cup takes place at UEFA headquarters in Nyon, Switzerland. (UEFA.com) Results:
  - Group A: Basel, Ferencváros, Feyenoord, Hearts, Schalke
  - Group B: Athletic Bilbao, Beşiktaş, Parma, Standard Liège, Steaua Bucharest
  - Group C: Austria Vienna, Club Brugge, Dnipro Dnipropetrovsk, Utrecht, Real Zaragoza
  - Group D: Dinamo Tbilisi, Newcastle United, Panionios, Sochaux, Sporting Lisbon
  - Group E: Egaleo, Lazio, Middlesbrough, Partizan Belgrade, Villarreal
  - Group F: Amica Wronki, Auxerre, AZ Alkmaar, Grazer AK, Rangers
  - Group G: Benfica, Beveren, Dinamo Zagreb, Heerenveen, VfB Stuttgart
  - Group H: AEK Athens, Alemannia, Lille, Sevilla, Zenit St. Petersburg
- Basketball:
  - NBA: Scottie Pippen, who starred alongside Michael Jordan for all of the Chicago Bulls' six NBA championships in the 1990s, announces his retirement. (ESPN)
  - WNBA: Sue Bird recovers from a collapse the day before, and the Seattle Storm defeat the Sacramento Monarchs, 82–62, to win their series, 2 to 1 and advance to the WNBA Finals, against the Connecticut Sun. (WNBA)
- NASCAR: Dale Earnhardt Jr. is fined US$10,000 and penalized 25 championship points for cursing during a television interview after his Sunday win at Talladega Superspeedway. The points penalty knocks him out of the lead in the race for the series championship. (ESPN)

== October 4, 2004 (Monday) ==
- Boxing: Ricardo Mayorga retires from boxing, following his eighth-round knockout loss against Félix Trinidad.
- National Football League Week 4, Monday Night Football: The Kansas City Chiefs defeat the Baltimore Ravens 27 to 24.
- Football: FC Zürich striker Cleonicio dos Santos Silva, better known as Renato, is killed by gunmen attempting to steal his car in Rio de Janeiro. His girlfriend is also injured. (ESPN)

== October 3, 2004 (Sunday) ==
- National Football League Week 4:
  - The New England Patriots tie an NFL record by winning their 18th game in a row, 31–17 over the Buffalo Bills. (Yahoo!/AP)
  - The Houston Texans win two games in a row for the first time in franchise history with a 30–17 win over the Oakland Raiders. (Yahoo!/AP)
- Baseball:
  - On the last day of the season, the Houston Astros clinch a playoff berth with a 5–3 win over the Colorado Rockies at Minute Maid Park, their 18th straight victory at home.
  - Seattle Mariners designated hitter Edgar Martínez goes 0 for 4 in his last career game.
  - Former Toronto Blue Jays pitcher and broadcaster John Cerutti dies of natural causes at age 44. (Toronto Blue Jays)
  - The Montreal Expos play their last-ever game under that moniker, losing 8 to 1 to the New York Mets at Shea Stadium.
- Cycling
  - 2004 UCI Road World Championships
    - Men's road race: (1) Óscar Freire Spain, (2) Erik Zabel Germany, (3) Luca Paolini Italy
- Rugby league: The Canterbury Bulldogs defeat the Sydney Roosters 16 to 13 to win their first NRL championship.

== October 2, 2004 (Saturday) ==
- Baseball: The Los Angeles Dodgers defeat the San Francisco Giants 7–3 on a walk-off grand slam from Steve Finley. The Anaheim Angels defeat the Oakland Athletics 5–4. The Dodgers and Anaheim clinched the NL West and AL West division titles, respectively. The Athletics were eliminated from playoff contention.
- Boxing: in what some experts are already calling the fight of the year, Félix Trinidad rises from a knockdown in round three and drops Ricardo Mayorga three times in round eight to score an eighth round knockout. (Boxing Central) (See: Trinidad versus Mayorga)
- Former WBO world Heavyweight champion Wladimir Klitschko also recovers from a knockdown, to defeat DaVarrill Williamson by a fifth round technical decision.
- Cycling
  - 2004 UCI Road World Championships
    - Women's road race: (1) Judith Arndt Germany, (2) Tatiana Guderzo Italy, (3) Anita Valen Germany

== October 1, 2004 (Friday) ==
- Baseball: Ichiro Suzuki sets the major league record for base hits in a season, breaking George Sisler's 84-year-old record of 257 base hits. Yahoo! Sports
- Sports magazines: Sports Illustrated releases its 50th anniversary issue.
- Basketball: DeMya Walker of the Sacramento Monarchs sinks a shot as time run out in overtime, to lift the Monarchs to a 74–72 win and a 1–0 lead over the Seattle Storm, in their WNBA western conference finals series. Walker's shot seemed to have gotten stuck on the back of the rim, then the ball moved slightly and went into the basket as time had expired.(WNBA)
- Cycling
  - 2004 UCI Road World Championships
    - Junior women's road race: (1) Marianne Vos Netherlands, (2) Marta Bastianelli Italy, (3) Ellen van Dijk Netherlands
