= Tatyana Kozlova =

Russian race walker

Tatyana Kozlova (born 2 September 1983 in Saransk) is a Russian race walker.

== Achievements ==
Year	Competition	Venue	Position	Event	Notes
Representing Russia
1999	World Youth Championships	Bydgoszcz, Poland	1st	5000 m	22:31.93
2000	World Junior Championships	Santiago, Chile	2nd	10,000 m	44:24.43
2002	World Junior Championships	Kingston, Jamaica	7th	10,000 m	47:51.79
2004	World Race Walking Cup	Naumburg, Germany	20th	20 km	1:30:31
