= Ryta Turava =

Belarusian racewalker

Ryta Turava (Belarusian Рыта Турава; Russian Rita Turova, Рита Турова, born 28 December 1980), also known as Margarita Turova, is an athlete from Belarus, competing in race walking. She was born in Vitebsk.

Her sister, Alesya Turava, is also a successful athlete, champion of Belarus in track and field (1500 metres: bronze medalist at the 2002 European Indoor Championships.

The all-time all-time women's 10-km race-walk record is held by Margarita Turova, at 42:05.

== Achievements ==
Year	Competition	Venue	Position	Event	Notes
Representing Belarus
1998	World Junior Championships	Annecy, France	6th	5000m	22:06.06
2001	European Race Walking Cup	Dudince, Slovakia	—	20 km	DNF
2001	European U23 Championships	Amsterdam, Netherlands	2nd	20 km	1:30:15
2004	Olympic Games	Athens, Greece	4th	20 km	1:29:39
2005	World Championships	Helsinki, Finland	2nd	20 km	1:27:05
2006	World Race Walking Cup	A Coruña, Spain	1st	20 km	1:26:27
2006	European Championships	Gothenburg, Sweden	1st	20 km	1:27:08
2007	European Race Walking Cup	Leamington Spa, Great Britain	1st	20 km	1:27:52
2008	Olympic Games	Beijing, China	10th	20 km	1:28:26
