= Sabine Krantz =

German race walker

Personal information
- Born: 6 February 1981 (age 45) Potsdam, East Germany
- Height: 1.67 m (5 ft 6 in)
- Weight: 51 kg (112 lb)

Sport
- Country: Germany
- Sport: Athletics
- Event: 20km Race Walk

Sabine Krantz (née Zimmer; born 6 February 1981) is a German race walker. She was born in Potsdam.

== International competitions ==
Year	Competition	Venue	Position	Event	Notes
Representing the Germany
1998	World Junior Championships	Annecy, France	1st	5,000 m	21:14.39
2000	European Race Walking Cup (U20)	Eisenhüttenstadt, Germany	4th	10 km	46:01
2000	European Race Walking Cup (U20)	Eisenhüttenstadt, Germany	3rd	Team - 10 km Junior	18 pts
2000	World Junior Championships	Santiago, Chile	3rd	10,000 m	46:49.97
2003	European U23 Championships	Bydgoszcz, Poland	3rd	20 km	1:35:56
2003	World Championships	Paris, France	20th	20 km	1:34:08
2004	World Race Walking Cup	Naumburg, Germany	15th	20 km	1:29:56
2004	Olympic Games	Athens, Greece	16th	20 km	1:31:59
2005	World Championships	Helsinki, Finland	23rd	20 km	1:34:24
2006	World Race Walking Cup	A Coruña, Spain	12th	20 km	1:29:54
2006	European Championships	Gothenburg, Sweden	6th	20 km	1:29:56
2007	World Championships	Osaka, Japan	8th	20 km	1:33:23
2008	World Race Walking Cup	Cheboksary, Russia	13th	20 km	1:30:39
2008	Olympic Games	Beijing, PR China	14th	20 km	1:30:19
2009	European Race Walking Cup	Metz, France	—	20 km	DNF
2009	World Championships	Berlin, Germany	—	20 km	DNF
2011	World Championships	Daegu, South Korea	—	20 km	DNF
2012	World Race Walking Cup	Saransk, Russia	—	20 km	DNF
2012	Olympic Games	London, United Kingdom	—	20 km	DNF
