= Tatyana Sibileva =

Russian racewalker

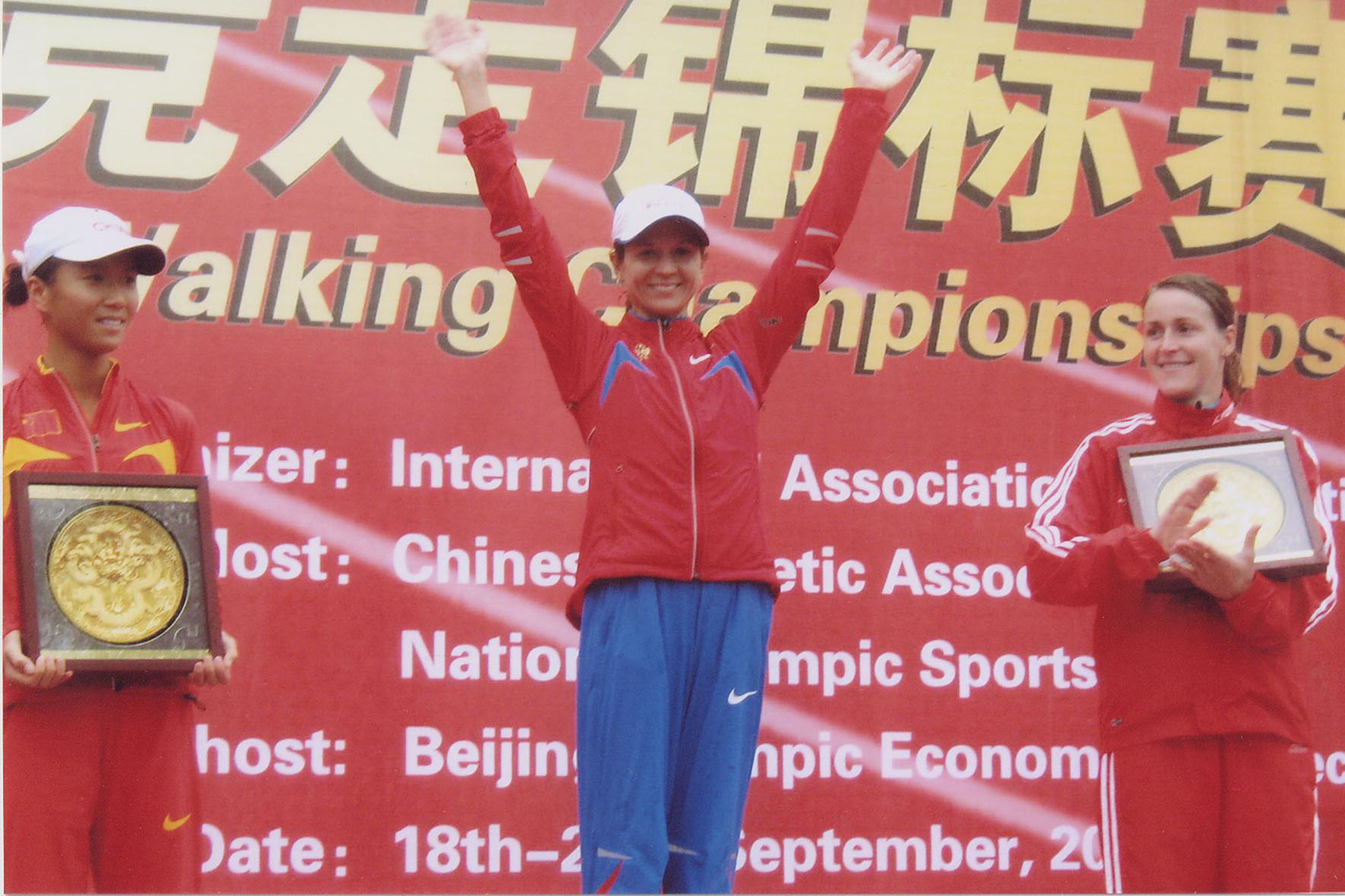
Tatyana Sibilyova (2010)

Tatyana Valeryevna Sibiliova (Russian: Татьяна Валерьевна Сибилёва; born 17 May 1980 in Chelyabinsk) is a female race walker from Russia.

She won the 2012 Memorial Mario Albisetti in Lugano.

== Achievements ==
Year	Competition	Venue	Position	Event	Notes
Representing Russia
2001	European Race Walking Cup	Dudince, Slovakia	21st	20 km	1:34:38
2001	European U23 Championships	Amsterdam, Netherlands	4th	20 km	1:32:23
2003	Universiade	Daegu, South Korea	1st	20 km	1:34:55
2005	Universiade	İzmir, Turkey	3rd	20 km	1:34:16
2007	World Championships	Osaka, Japan	9th	20 km	1:33:29
2008	World Race Walking Cup	Cheboksary, Russia	2nd	20 km	1:26:29
2008	Olympic Games	Beijing, China	11th	20 km	1:28:28
