= Zuzana Malíková =

Slovak racewalker

Personal information
- Born: 2 August 1983 (age 43) Nové Zámky
- Height: 166 cm (5 ft 5 in)

Sport
- Country: Slovakia
- Sport: Athletics
- Event: Racewalking
Medal record
European Cup
Bronze medal – third place	2009 Metz	20 km team
- Updated on 29 August 2015

Zuzana Malíková (born 2 August 1983 in Nové Zámky) is a retired Slovak female race walker.

== Career ==
She is a two-time Olympian with 22nd being her best placing achieved at the 2004 Summer Olympics in Athens. Her biggest success was the team bronze medal at the 2009 European Race Walking Cup in Metz. She retired in 2011. She represented the club Lokomotíva Šurany.

In 2010, she needed a whole four attempts to meet the qualification standard to the European Championships in Barcelona. These attempts included the national championships, where she stood down after it became clear that her time would be slower than the standard. She finally met the mark as she won the International Race Walking Festival in Alytus. At the championships, she failed to finish the race.

Setting Slovak records in racewalking, Malíková held the national record in the 20 kilometres walk for several years. Having walked the distance in 1:32:14 hours at the 2006 European Championships, the record was ultimately improved by Mária Gáliková who raced in 1:32:03 hours in 2014.

== Personal life ==
In 2006, Zuzana Malíková won the national race walking championships in Borský Mikuláš ahead of her own first cousin, Klára Malíková. Klára Malíková finished seventh at the 2005 European Junior Championships and thirteenth at the 2006 World Junior Championships.

== Achievements ==
Year	Competition	Venue	Position	Event	Notes
Representing Slovakia
1999	World Youth Championships	Bydgoszcz, Poland	7th	5000 m	24:03.81
2000	World Junior Championships	Santiago, Chile	8th	10,000 m	48:00.84
2001	European Junior Championships	Grosseto, Italy	6th	10,000 m	48:20.12
2002	World Junior Championships	Kingston, Jamaica	5th	10,000 m	46:46.29
2002	World Race Walking Cup	Turin, Italy	47th	20 km	1:39:50
2003	European U23 Championships	Bydgoszcz, Poland	7th	20 km	1:44:03
2004	World Race Walking Cup	Naumburg, Germany	—	20 km	DNF
2004	Olympic Games	Athens, Greece	22nd	20 km	1:33:17
2005	European U23 Championships	Erfurt, Germany	5th	20 km	1:38:32
2005	Universiade	İzmir, Turkey	6th	20 km	1:37:39
2006	World Race Walking Cup	A Coruña, Spain	39th	20 km	1:36:51
2006	European Championships	Gothenburg, Sweden	13th	20 km	1:32:14 (NR)
2007	Universiade	Bangkok, Thailand	6th	20 km	1:39:06
2007	World Championships	Osaka, Japan	18th	20 km	1:36:26
2008	World Race Walking Cup	Cheboksary, Russia	—	20 km	DNF
2008	Olympic Games	Beijing, China	31st	20 km	1:34:33
2009	European Race Walking Cup	Metz, France	18th	20 km	1:39:42
2009	European Race Walking Cup	Metz, France	3rd	Team - 20 km	72 pts
2009	World Championships	Berlin, Germany	26th	20 km	1:37:47
2010	European Championships	Barcelona, Spain	—	20 km	DNF
