= September 2004 in sports =

| << | September 2004 | | | | | >> |
| Su | Mo | Tu | We | Th | Fr | Sa |
| | | | 1 | 2 | 3 | 4 |
| 5 | 6 | 7 | 8 | 9 | 10 | 11 |
| 12 | 13 | 14 | 15 | 16 | 17 | 18 |
| 19 | 20 | 21 | 22 | 23 | 24 | 25 |
| 26 | 27 | 28 | 29 | 30 |
Sports

This list shows notable sports-related deaths, events, and outcomes that occurred in September of 2004.

== Deaths ==
- 20 Brian Clough
- 4 Bob Boyd

== September 30, 2004 (Thursday) ==
- UEFA Cup 2004–05 First Round, Second Leg. Teams progressing to the group stage shown in **bold**. Group stage draw takes place at UEFA headquarters, Nyon, Switzerland on 5 October. Group matchdays will be (1) 21 October, (2) 4 November, (3) 25 November, (4) 1 December and 2 December, and (5) 15 December and 16 December.
  - **Amica Wronki** 1 – 0 FK Ventspils
  - **Dinamo Tbilisi** 2 – 1 Wisła Kraków (Dinamo win on away goals)
  - **Lille** 2 – 0 Shelbourne
  - **Dnipro Dnipropetrovsk** 2 – 0 Maccabi Haifa
  - **FC Basel** 2 – 0 Terek Grozny
  - Liepājas Metalurgs 0 – 4 **Schalke 04**
  - **AEK Athens** 1 – 0 NK Gorica
  - **Feyenoord** 4 – 1 Odd Grenland
  - **Auxerre** 2 – 0 Aalborg
  - PFC Litex Lovech 1 – 0 **Grazer AK**
  - Djurgårdens IF 3 – 0 **FC Utrecht**
  - **K.S.K. Beveren** 1 – 0 Levski Sofia
  - **Ferencváros** 3 – 1 Millwall
  - Hapoel Bnei Sakhnin 1 – 5 **Newcastle United**
  - Braga 2 – 2 **Hearts**
  - **Lazio** 3 – 0 Metalurh Donetsk
  - Dinamo Bucharest 0 – 0 **Partizan Belgrade**
  - CSKA Sofia 2 – 2 **Steaua Bucharest**
  - Baník Ostrava 1 – 1 **Middlesbrough**
  - **Rangers** 1 – 0 Marítimo (Rangers win penalty shoot-out)
  - FK Crvena Zvezda 1 – 2 **Zenit St. Petersburg**
  - **Athletic Bilbao** 2 – 0 Trabzonspor
  - **Villarreal** 3 – 0 Hammarby
  - Elfsborg 0 – 0 **Dinamo Zagreb**
  - **Alemannia** 0 – 0 Fimleikafélag Hafnarfjarðar
  - Châteauroux 1 – 2 **Club Brugge**
  - Stabæk 0 – 5 **Sochaux**
  - Gençlerbirligi 1 – 1 **Egaleo**
  - **VfB Stuttgart** 4 – 0 Újpest FC
  - VfL Bochum 1 – 1 **Standard Liège** (Standard win on away goals)
  - **Benfica** 2 – 0 FK Dukla Banská Bystrica
  - NK Maribor 0 – 0 **Parma**
  - Legia Warszawa 1 – 3 **Austria Vienna**
  - **Beşiktaş** 1 – 0 Bodø/Glimt
  - Sigma Olomouc 2 – 3 **Real Zaragoza**
  - CD Nacional 1 – 2 **Sevilla**
  - Udinese 1 – 0 **Panionios**
  - Rapid Vienna 0 – 0 **Sporting Lisbon**
  - **AZ Alkmaar** 2 – 1 PAOK
- UEFA Cup first round (tie decided over one leg only, because of general strike in Israel last week):
  - **Heerenveen** 5 – 0 Maccabi Petach Tikva

== September 29, 2004 (Wednesday) ==
- More than three decades after the Washington Senators were moved away from Washington, D.C., city officials there announce that Major League Baseball will return to the city in 2005: the city's relocation bid for the Montreal Expos has been accepted, ending years of uncertainty about the future of that franchise. (5 p.m. EDT)
- UEFA Champions League, Group Stage, Matchday 2
  - Group E: PSV 1 – 0 Panathinaikos
  - Group E: Rosenborg 1 – 1 Arsenal
  - Group F: FC Barcelona 3 – 0 Shakhtar Donetsk
  - Group F: A.C. Milan 3 – 1 Celtic
  - Group G: Anderlecht 1 – 3 Inter Milan
  - Group G: Werder Bremen 2 – 1 Valencia
  - Group H: Chelsea 3 – 1 F.C. Porto
  - Group H: CSKA Moscow 2 – 0 Paris Saint Germain

== September 28, 2004 (Tuesday) ==
- UEFA Champions League, Group Stage, Matchday 2
  - Group A: AS Monaco 2 – 0 Deportivo La Coruña
  - Group A: Olympiacos 1 – 0 Liverpool
  - Group B: Dynamo Kyiv 4 – 2 Bayer Leverkusen
  - Group B: Real Madrid 4 – 2 AS Roma
  - Group C: Bayern Munich 4 – 0 Ajax
  - Group C: Juventus 1 – 0 Maccabi Tel Aviv
  - Group D: Manchester United 6 – 2 Fenerbahçe
  - Group D: Sparta Prague 1 – 2 Olympique Lyonnais

== September 27, 2004 (Monday) ==
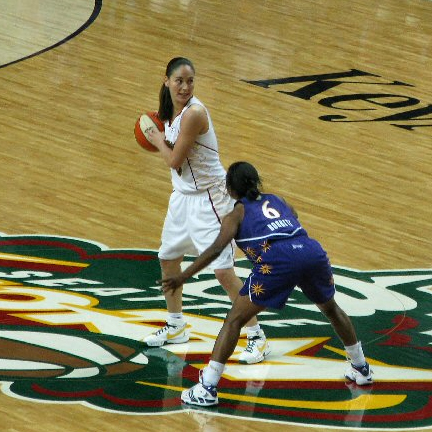
Sue Bird, on offense

- Basketball:
  - The New Orleans Hornets announce that Jamal Mashburn will not play in the 2004–2005 NBA season because of a knee injury. (ESPN)
  - Sue Bird breaks her nose and requires a brief visit to a hospital, but her Seattle Storm win their first WNBA playoff series ever, beating the Minnesota Lynx 64–54 to win their opening round series, 2 games to 0. (ESPN)
  - Diana Taurasi of the Phoenix Mercury is named the WNBA's rookie of the year. (ESPN)
- Baseball: The Boston Red Sox clinch a playoff berth by defeating the Tampa Bay Devil Rays, 7 runs to 3. (ESPN)
- National Football League Week 3, Monday Night Football: The Dallas Cowboys spoil Joe Gibbs' return to MNF with a 21 to 18 win over the Washington Redskins.

== September 26, 2004 (Sunday) ==
- Formula One: The inaugural Chinese Grand Prix in Shanghai entertains the crowd of nearly 200,000 with an exciting race, won by Brazilian Rubens Barrichello, separated by less than 1.5 seconds from second place Briton Jenson Button and Finn Kimi Räikkönen in third place. (Guardian)
- National Football League Week 3:
  - Peyton Manning throws for five touchdowns and Brett Favre throws his 4000th completion as the Indianapolis Colts defeat the Green Bay Packers 45–31. (Yahoo!/AP)
  - Tampa Bay Buccaneers receiver Tim Brown catches his 100th career touchdown pass in a game against his former team, the Oakland Raiders. (Yahoo!/AP)
  - The San Francisco 49ers are shut out for the first time since 1977 in a 34–0 loss to the Seattle Seahawks. (Yahoo!/AP)
  - The Jacksonville Jaguars are 3–0 for the first time since 1998 after a last-second 15–12 win over the Tennessee Titans. (Yahoo!/AP)
  - The Kansas City Chiefs likewise fall to 0–3 after being beat in the final seconds by the Houston Texans, 24–21. (Yahoo!/AP)
  - Morten Andersen of the Minnesota Vikings makes an appearance in the Vikings' game against the Chicago Bears, marking his 341st appearance in an NFL game, and breaking George Blanda's record. Blanda played with the Bears and the Oakland Raiders. Besides the Vikings, Andersen has played for the New Orleans Saints, the Atlanta Falcons, the New York Giants and the Kansas City Chiefs. (Chicago Bear Report)

== September 25, 2004 (Saturday) ==
- Boxing: Glen Johnson retains his IBF light heavyweight title by knocking out Roy Jones Jr. in the ninth round. Jones' record now stands 49–3–0 while Johnson stands for 41–9–2. (ESPN)
- Riddick Bowe makes a triumphant return to the sport after an eight-year hiatus, knocking out Marcus Rhode in two rounds.
- Cricket, ICC Champions Trophy: The West Indies defeat England in the final at The Oval by two wickets with seven balls to spare. It's their first major tournament victory since the 1979 World Cup. (BBC)
- Aussie rules: The Port Adelaide Football Club win their first AFL championship by ending the Brisbane Lions' three-year run as champions 113 to 73 at Melbourne Cricket Ground in Melbourne.
- National Football League: The Miami Dolphins are forced to reschedule a home game for the second time in three weeks due to a hurricane. Their game against the Pittsburgh Steelers is being moved from 1:00 on Sunday, September 26 to 8:30 because of the threat of Hurricane Jeanne. (USA Today)

== September 24, 2004 (Friday) ==
- Baseball: Boston pitcher Pedro Martínez earns a no-decision after a poor showing in his last start as the Red Sox lose to the New York Yankees 6 to 4 at Fenway Park in Boston.
- Women's boxing: Laila Ali wins the IWBF Light Heavyweight title, knocking out Gwendolyn O'Neal in three rounds, at Atlanta.

== September 23, 2004 (Thursday) ==
- Baseball: Baltimore second baseman Brian Roberts hit his 48th double of the season, breaking the franchise record set by Cal Ripken Jr. in 1983.
- Boxing: James Toney scores an eighth-round knockdown, on his way to a twelve-round unanimous decision win over Rydell Booker. (BoxingCentral)

== September 22, 2004 (Wednesday) ==
- Football (soccer): Today's scheduled UEFA Cup First round, first leg, match between Maccabi Petach-Tikva and Heerenveen is cancelled when a general strike in Israel prevents the Dutch team from travelling to the match. The tie will be decided by one match in the Netherlands on September 30, when the away goals rule will not apply. (UEFA.com)
- Cricket, ICC Champions Trophy: In the second semi-final at The Rose Bowl, the West Indies beat Pakistan by seven wickets. (BBC)

== September 21, 2004 (Tuesday) ==
- Football (soccer): UEFA ruled that the September 15 UEFA Champions League fixture in Rome between Dynamo Kyiv and AS Roma, abandoned at halftime when referee Anders Frisk was hit by an object thrown onto the field, would be a 3–0 forfeit win to Dynamo Kyiv. Roma will be required to play its next two home Champions League fixtures, against Bayer Leverkusen on November 3 and Real Madrid on November 8, with no spectators. (ESPN Soccernet)
- Cricket, ICC Champions Trophy: In the first semi-final at Edgbaston, England beat Australia by six wickets. (BBC)

== September 20, 2004 (Monday) ==
- Football (soccer): Real Madrid manager José Antonio Camacho resigns.
- National Football League Week 2, Monday Night Football: Philadelphia Eagles quarterback Donovan McNabb goes 19 for 28 with 245 yards and two touchdowns as the Eagles defeat the Minnesota Vikings 27 to 16.

== September 19, 2004 (Sunday) ==
- Golf: In the final day's play in the 2004 Ryder Cup, Lee Westwood sinks the putt that ensures that Europe retains the Ryder Cup, and Colin Montgomerie sinks the putt that gives Team Europe an outright victory, as the European team defeats the United States of America 18½ to 9½. (BBC)
- Cricket, ICC Champions Trophy: In pool C, Pakistan beat India by three wickets at Edgbaston. In the held-over pool B match from yesterday, the West Indies beat South Africa by five wickets at The Oval. Both Pakistan and the West Indies now qualify for the semi-finals. (BBC) (BBC)
- American football: Week 2 of the NFL season
  - The Arizona Cardinals retire the #40 of Pat Tillman at halftime of their game against the New England Patriots at Tempe, Arizona.
  - Tom Coughlin gets his first win as head coach of the New York Giants, 20 to 14, over the Washington Redskins. (Yahoo! Sports)
  - Jerry Rice's record of 274 consecutive games with a pass reception comes to an end, although his Oakland Raiders defeat the Buffalo Bills, 13–10. (MSNBC)

== September 18, 2004 (Saturday) ==
- Boxing: Bernard Hopkins retains his IBF, WBA, and WBC world Middleweight titles, while adding the WBO one, knocking out Oscar De La Hoya in nine rounds

== Science ==
- Las Vegas, Nevada. It is de la Hoya's first career knockout loss.
- Golf: After the second day's play in the 2004 Ryder Cup, Europe leads the United States 11–5. The U.S. took the morning's fourballs 2½ to 1½, and Europe won the afternoon's foursomes 3–1. Europe needs just three points from Sunday's twelve singles matches to retain the trophy. (BBC)
- Cricket, ICC Champions Trophy: In pool D, England beat Sri Lanka by 49 runs on the Duckworth–Lewis method after rain caused the match to be abandoned before Sri Lanka's innings was complete. England now qualify for the semi-finals. The pool B match between South Africa and the West Indies is also interrupted by rain and will conclude tomorrow. (BBC)

== September 17, 2004 (Friday) ==
- 2004 Summer Paralympics: The opening ceremony takes place in Athens, Greece.
- Golf: Europe leads the United States 6½ to 1½ at the end of the first day of the 35th Ryder Cup Matches at Oakland Hills Country Club in suburban Detroit. Europe led the morning's fourball matches 3½ to ½ and extended the lead by taking the afternoon foursome 3 matches to 1. (BBC) (BBC)
- Cricket, ICC Champions Trophy: In pool D, the match between England and Sri Lanka is interrupted by rain with England on 118–3 after 31 overs. The match will resume tomorrow. (BBC)
- Baseball: Nippon Professional Baseball players announce they will go on strike for the first time in Japan's history. The strike is made in protest of a proposed merger between the Orix BlueWave and the Kintetsu Buffaloes. (ESPN.com)
- Baseball: Barry Bonds hits the 700th home run of his career in a game against the San Diego Padres. (ESPN.com)
- Baseball: Ichiro Suzuki of the Seattle Mariners breaks the major league baseball record for most singles in a season by hitting his 199th of the year, breaking the record of 198 set by Lloyd Waner in 1927. (Canada.Com)
- Baseball: Frank Francisco of the Texas Rangers gets suspended for the rest of the season, stemming from an altercation where he hit a woman on her nose with a chair in a game against the Oakland A's.

== September 16, 2004 (Thursday) ==
- Football (soccer): UEFA announce that their disciplinary panel will meet on 21 September to determine AS Roma's punishment for the violence which caused last night's UEFA Champions League match against Dynamo Kyiv to be abandoned at half time. When there was violence at Roma's ground two years ago at a Champions League match against Galatasaray, also refereed by Anders Frisk, Roma were fined about €350 thousand, leading to speculation that there will be a more severe punishment this time. (BBC)
- Football (soccer): Premier League club Blackburn Rovers confirm that they have signed Mark Hughes as their new manager. Hughes, who takes over from Graeme Souness, had been managing the Wales national football team. (Sky Sports)
- UEFA Cup 2004–05 First Round, First Leg
  - Ventspils 1 – 1 Amica Wronki
  - Wisła Kraków 4 – 3 Dinamo Tbilisi
  - Shelbourne 2 – 2 Lille
  - Maccabi Haifa 1 – 0 Dnipro Dnipropetrovsk
  - Terek Grozny 1 – 1 FC Basel
  - Schalke 5 – 1 Liepājas Metalurgs
  - NK Gorica 1 – 1 AEK Athens
  - Odd Grenland 0 – 1 Feyenoord
  - Aalborg 1 – 1 Auxerre
  - Grazer AK 5 – 0 Litex Lovech
  - FC Utrecht 4 – 0 Djurgårdens IF
  - Levski Sofia 1 – 1 Beveren
  - Millwall 1 – 1 Ferencváros
  - Newcastle United 2 – 0 Hapoel Bnei Sakhnin
  - Hearts 3 – 1 Braga
  - Metalurh Donetsk 0 – 3 Lazio
  - Partizan Belgrade 3 – 1 Dinamo Bucharest
  - Steaua Bucharest 2 – 1 CSKA Sofia
  - Middlesbrough 3 – 0 Baník Ostrava
  - Marítimo 1 – 0 Rangers
  - Zenit St. Petersburg 4 – 0 Red Star Belgrade
  - Trabzonspor 3 – 2 Athletic Bilbao
  - Hammarby 1 – 2 Villarreal
  - Dinamo Zagreb 2 – 0 Elfsborg
  - Fimleikafélag Hafnarfjarðar 1 – 5 Alemannia
  - Club Brugge 4 – 0 Châteauroux
  - Sochaux 4 – 0 Stabæk
  - Egaleo 1 – 0 Gençlerbirligi
  - Újpest 1 – 3 VfB Stuttgart
  - Standard Liège 0 – 0 VfL Bochum
  - Dukla Banská Bystrica 0 – 3 Benfica
  - Parma 3 – 2 NK Maribor
  - Austria Vienna 1 – 0 Legia Warszawa
  - Bodø/Glimt 1 – 1 Beşiktaş
  - Real Zaragoza 1 – 0 Sigma Olomouc
  - Sevilla 2 – 0 CD Nacional
  - Panionios 3 – 1 Udinese
  - Sporting Lisbon 2 – 0 Rapid Vienna
  - PAOK 2 – 3 AZ Alkmaar (UEFA.com)
- Cricket, ICC Champions Trophy: In pool A, Australia beat New Zealand by seven wickets at The Oval, and qualify for the semi-finals. (BBC)

== September 15, 2004 (Wednesday) ==
- National Hockey League: In the United States, the NHL board of governors agrees to a lockout of players upon the collapse of labor negotiations with the NHL Players Association. This means the 2004–2005 NHL season is suspended until further notice. (Toronto Star)(CBC)
- UEFA Champions League, Group Stage, Matchday 1
  - Group A: Liverpool 2 – 0 AS Monaco
  - Group A: Deportivo La Coruña 0 – 0 Olympiacos
  - Group B: Bayer Leverkusen 3 – 0 Real Madrid
  - Group B: AS Roma – Dynamo Kyiv
    - Match abandoned at half time when referee Anders Frisk was struck by an object. Kyiv were leading 1–0. On September 21, a UEFA disciplinary panel gave Kyiv a 3–0 forfeit win.
  - Group C: Ajax 0 – 1 Juventus
  - Group C: Maccabi Tel Aviv 0 – 1 Bayern Munich
  - Group D: Fenerbahçe 1 – 0 Sparta Prague
  - Group D: Olympique Lyonnais 2 – 2 Manchester United (UEFA.com) (BBC)
- Cricket, ICC Champions Trophy: In the pool C match held over from yesterday, Pakistan beat Kenya by seven wickets at Edgbaston. Meanwhile, in pool B, the West Indies beat Bangladesh by 138 runs at The Rose Bowl. (BBC) (BBC)

== September 14, 2004 (Tuesday) ==
- 2004 World Cup of Hockey: Shane Doan scores the winning goal as Canada defeats Finland by a score of 3–2 in the tournament final match.
- UEFA Champions League Group Stage Matchday 1
  - Group E: Panathinaikos 2 – 1 Rosenborg
  - Group E: Arsenal 1 – 0 PSV
  - Group F: Shakhtar Donetsk 0 – 1 A.C. Milan
  - Group F: Celtic 1 – 3 Barcelona
  - Group G: Valencia 2 – 0 Anderlecht
  - Group G: Inter Milan 2 – 0 Werder Bremen
  - Group H: Paris Saint-Germain 0 – 3 Chelsea
  - Group H: Porto 0 – 0 CSKA Moscow
- Cricket, ICC Champions Trophy: In pool D, Sri Lanka beat Zimbabwe by 4 wickets at The Oval. The other scheduled match, between Pakistan and Kenya, is rained off and will be played tomorrow. (BBC)

== September 13, 2004 (Monday) ==
- Cricket, ICC Champions Trophy: In pool A, Australia beat the USA by 9 wickets at The Rose Bowl. (BBC)
- Baseball: Texas Rangers pitcher Frank Francisco throws a chair at an Oakland Athletics fan who was heckling him, starting a bench-clearing brawl. Francisco was arrested for aggravated battery. (San Jose Mercury)
- National Football League Week 1, Monday Night Football: In the first Monday night game of the season, the Green Bay Packers defeat the defending NFC champion Carolina Panthers 24 to 14. Packers fullback Ahman Green rushes 33 times for 119 yards and two touchdowns.

== September 12, 2004 (Sunday) ==
- Tennis: Roger Federer defeats Lleyton Hewitt 6–0, 7–6, 6–0 to win the US Open men's singles title in Flushing, New York. (ESPN) (The Australian)
- American football: Most National Football League teams play their Week 1 games:
  - Joe Gibbs wins the first game of his return to coaching as his Washington Redskins defeat the Tampa Bay Buccaneers 16–10. (Yahoo!/AP)
  - The Detroit Lions break a 24-game road losing streak by beating the Chicago Bears 20–16. (Yahoo!/AP)
  - Terrell Owens catches three touchdowns in his first game with the Philadelphia Eagles. The Eagles defeat the New York Giants 31–17. (Yahoo!/AP)
- Cricket, ICC Champions Trophy: In pool B, South Africa beat Bangladesh by 9 wickets at Edgbaston. (BBC)
- Formula One, Italian Grand Prix: Rubens Barrichello wins his first race of the season, with Ferrari teammate Michael Schumacher second and Jenson Button third. (BBC)

== September 11, 2004 (Saturday) ==
- World Cup of Hockey: Vincent Lecavalier scores at 3:45 in overtime as Canada advances to the final with a 4–3 win over the Czech Republic in Toronto. The Canadians will take on Finland in the championship game, also in Toronto on September 14. (WCH website)
- Cricket, ICC Champions Trophy: In the uncompleted pool D match from yesterday, England beat Zimbabwe by 152 runs. In pool C, India beat Kenya by 98 runs. (BBC)
- Boxing: Miguel Cotto defeats Kelson Pinto by TKO, crowning himself world champion of the WBO 140 pounds (64 kg) division, while Daniel Santos retains his WBO super welterweight crown after defeating Antonio Margarito by technical decision after ten rounds, at the same undercard, held in San Juan, Puerto Rico.(Boxing central)
- US Open: In an all-Russian women's singles final, Svetlana Kuznetsova beats Elena Dementieva 6–3 7–5 to win her first Grand Slam title. (BBC)
- Horse racing: Rule of Law wins the St. Leger Stakes, the final leg of the English Triple Crown, at Doncaster. (BBC)
- Baseball: Barry Bonds does not become the third player in baseball history to hit 700 home-runs by going one for one with a single against the Arizona Diamondbacks, but he does break his own record for walks in a single season, getting three walks to top the 198 walks he had in 2002, in a Giants 5–3 win.
- Basketball: The University of South Florida announces that female basketball player Andrea Armstrong will be allowed to play wearing her muslim attires.

== September 10, 2004 (Friday) ==
- Cricket, ICC Champions Trophy: In pool A, New Zealand beat the USA by 210 runs. The pool D match between England and Zimbabwe is interrupted by rain and will conclude tomorrow. (BBC)
- World Cup of Hockey: Finland eliminates the United States with a 2–1 semi-final win in St. Paul, Minnesota. Saku Koivu scores the winning goal with less than four minutes left to play in the third period. The Finns will travel to Toronto to play the winner of Saturday's match between Canada and the Czech Republic on September 14. (WCH website)

== September 9, 2004 (Thursday) ==
- American football:
  - The National Football League season opened with the New England Patriots defeating the Indianapolis Colts 27–24 in Foxboro, Massachusetts. Colts kicker Mike Vanderjagt missed his first field goal since 2002 in the final 30 seconds. (Yahoo!/AP)
  - The National Football League announces the game between the Miami Dolphins and Tennessee Titans, originally scheduled for Sunday, September 12, is being moved to Saturday, September 11 due to the threat of Hurricane Ivan. The game will be televised in the Miami and Tennessee areas only. (Fox)
- Ice hockey: The executive committees of the National Hockey League and National Hockey League Players' Association meet at a secret location in Toronto for collective bargaining negotiations. The NHLPA submits a proposal that is believed to be similar to the offer it made on October 1, 2003. It is quickly rejected by the league. (AP)
- Basketball:
  - The WNBA's Chamique Holdsclaw declares she will not play for the Washington Mystics for the rest of the year, due to an unspecified medical reason.(ESPN)
  - Lisa Leslie of the Los Angeles Sparks records the WNBA's third triple-double in history, scoring 29 points, grabbing 15 rebounds and tying the WNBA's record of ten blocked shots in one game, as the Sparks defeat the defending champion Detroit Shock, 81–63, in Los Angeles. (WNBA)

== September 8, 2004 (Wednesday) ==
- World Cup of Hockey: Canada advances to the semi-finals by beating Slovakia 5–0 in Toronto. Canada will play the Czech Republic, while the United States will play Finland. (WCH website)
- Basketball: The Chicago Bulls trade Dikembe Mutombo to the Houston Rockets for reserve guards Adrian Griffin, Eric Piatkowski and Mike Wilks. (CNNSI/AP)

== September 7, 2004 (Tuesday) ==
- World Cup of Hockey: In Stockholm, the Czech Republic routs Sweden 6–1 to advance to the semi-finals in North America. The United States also advance largely due to the play of Keith Tkachuk, who scores four goals in a 5–3 win over Russia in St. Paul, Minnesota. (WCH website) (WCH website)

== September 6, 2004 (Monday) ==
- Football: Graeme Souness resigns as manager of Blackburn Rovers to take over the vacant post at Newcastle United. Newcastle had dismissed their previous manager, Sir Bobby Robson on August 30. (BBC)
- World Cup of Hockey: In Helsinki, Finland survive a scare from Germany to win their quarter-final match 2–1 on a late goal from Mikko Eloranta. The Finns will now travel to North America for their semi-final match. (WCH website)
- Baseball: The New York Yankees ask for a forfeit in the first game of a doubleheader against the Tampa Bay Devil Rays. The Devil Rays were late getting to Yankee Stadium after delays caused by Hurricane Frances. Commissioner Bud Selig denies the request, and says a make-up game will be held on October 4 if required. The Yankees win the only game played, 7–4. (CNNSI/AP)
- Vijay Singh wins golf's Deutsche Bank Championship to go to the top of the world rankings. He ends Tiger Woods reign of five years and four weeks. (BBC)

== September 5, 2004 (Sunday) ==
- World Cup of Hockey: In the final North American group match, Russia defeats Slovakia 5–2 in Toronto. The Russians finish 2–1 and will travel to St. Paul, Minnesota to play the United States in the quarter-finals. The Slovaks finish 0–3 and will remain in Toronto to face Canada in the other quarter-final match. (WCH website)

== September 4, 2004 (Saturday) ==
- Boxing: Former world Welterweight champion Ricardo Mayorga is arrested at Managua International Airport in Managua, Nicaragua, charged with the rape of a twenty-year-old woman, and putting his October 2 fight with Félix Trinidad in serious jeopardy. (BoxingCentral)
- American football: De La Salle High School of Concord, California loses to Bellevue High School of Bellevue, Washington 39–20, ending De La Salle's record 151-game winning streak dating back to 1991. (ESPN) (Los Angeles Daily News)
- World Cup of Hockey: Canada finishes atop the North American pool standings with a 3–0 record after they defeat Russia 3–1 in Toronto. The Russians drop to 1–1. In the European pool, Sweden ties Finland 4–4 in Helsinki and both teams finish the group stage with a 2–0–1 record. The Finns earn top spot due to their superior goal difference and will host Germany in the quarter-finals, while the Swedes will host the Czech Republic. (WCH website) (WCH website)

== September 3, 2004 (Friday) ==
- World Cup of Hockey: In the North American pool, the United States defeats Slovakia 3–1 in St. Paul, Minnesota. The Americans finish the group stage with a 1–2 record, while the Slovaks drop to 0–2. In the European pool, the Czech Republic also earn their first win of the tournament with a 7–2 win over Germany in Prague. The Czechs finish round-robin play with a 1–2 record, while the Germans finish 0–3. (WCH website)(WCH website)

== September 2, 2004 (Thursday) ==
- Rugby union: England national team coach Sir Clive Woodward resigns, after having been dissuaded from doing so yesterday. Andy Robinson is named acting coach of England. Woodward has expressed his interest in switching codes to soccer. The media reports that he may be appointed to a role at Southampton Football Club. (BBC (1)), (BBC (2))
- World Cup of Hockey: Russia wins its opening North American pool match against the United States by a 3–1 score in St. Paul, Minnesota, dropping the Americans to 0–2. Finland records a 3–0 win against Germany in a European group match in Cologne, improving the Finns to 2–0 and ensuring home-ice advantage for themselves and Sweden in the quarter-finals. The Germans drop to 0–2. (AP)(CP)

== September 1, 2004 (Wednesday) ==
- Horse racing: In early morning raids by 130 officers in three counties, British police arrest three jockeys including champion jockey Kieren Fallon, a trainer, and twelve other people as part of a long-running investigation into race-fixing. (BBC)
- World Cup of Hockey: Canada defeats Slovakia 5–1 in a North American pool match in Montreal, improving the Canadians to 2–0 and dropping the Slovaks to 0–1. In the European group match in Stockholm, Sweden defeats the Czech Republic 4–3 and moves to 2–0, while the Czechs drop to 0–2. (AP)
