= 2000 World Junior Championships in Athletics – Women's 10,000 metres walk =

The women's 10,000 metres walk event at the 2000 World Junior Championships in Athletics was held in Santiago, Chile, at Estadio Nacional Julio Martínez Prádanos on 20 October.

== Medalists ==
Gold	Lyudmila Yefimkina; Russia
Silver	Tatyana Kozlova; Russia
Bronze	Sabine Zimmer; Germany

== Results ==
=== Final ===
20 October

Rank	Name	Nationality	Time	Notes
1st place, gold medalist(s)	Lyudmila Yefimkina	Russia	44:07.74	
2nd place, silver medalist(s)	Tatyana Kozlova	Russia	44:24.43	
3rd place, bronze medalist(s)	Sabine Zimmer	Germany	46:49.97	
4	Athanasía Tsoumeléka	Greece	47:10.96	
5	Vera Santos	Portugal	47:11.18	
6	Beatriz Pascual	Spain	47:14.79	
7	Melissa Rodriguez	France	47:57.88	
8	Zuzana Malíková	Slovakia	48:00.84	
9	Francesca Balloni	Italy	48:48.46	
10	Laura Johnson	Australia	49:06.47	
11	Stephanie Panzig	Germany	49:06.91	
12	Natalia García	Mexico	50:00.86	
13	Ankica Barzut	Yugoslavia	50:25.00	
14	Edina Füsti	Hungary	51:30.27	
15	Tiina Muinonen	Finland	52:01.94	
16	Robyn Stevens	United States	52:03.24	
17	Ariana Quino Salazar	Bolivia	52:04.46	
18	Toshie Kawatsu	Japan	52:09.56	
19	Alina Olaru	Romania	52:27.20	
20	Cristina López	El Salvador	53:12.90	
21	Lizbeth Zúñiga	Peru	55:05.05	
	Gao Kelian	China	DQ	
	Marina Tikhonova	Belarus	DQ	
	Luisa Paltin	Ecuador	DQ	
	Han Min	China	DQ	
	Evaggelía Xynoú	Greece	DNF	
	Mariela Rivera	Mexico	DNF	
	Carla Monteiro	Portugal	DNF	

== Participation ==
According to an unofficial count, 28 athletes from 22 countries participated in the event.

- Australia (1)
- Belarus (1)
- Bolivia (1)
- China (2)
- Ecuador (1)
- El Salvador (1)
- Finland (1)
- France (1)
- Germany (2)
- Greece (2)
- Hungary (1)
- Italy (1)
- Japan (1)
- Mexico (2)
- Peru (1)
- Portugal (2)
- Romania (1)
- Russia (2)
- Slovakia (1)
- Spain (1)
- United States (1)
- Yugoslavia (1)
