= Athletics at the 2007 Summer Universiade – Women's 20 kilometres walk =

The women's 20 kilometres walk event at the 2007 Summer Universiade was held on 9 August.

== Results ==
Rank	Name	Nationality	Time	Notes
1st place, gold medalist(s)	Jiang Qiuyan	China	1:35:22	
2nd place, silver medalist(s)	Lidia Mongelli	Italy	1:37:23	
3rd place, bronze medalist(s)	Sniazhana Yurchanka	Belarus	1:37:26	
4	Kumi Otoshi	Japan	1:37:36	
5	Neringa Aidietytė	Lithuania	1:38:57	
6	Zuzana Malíková	Slovakia	1:39:06	
7	Larisa Emelyanova	Russia	1:39:48	
8	Alina Olaru	Romania	1:40:12	
9	Zhanna Halaunia	Belarus	1:40:42	
10	Brigita Virbalytė	Lithuania	1:41:06	
11	Mária Gáliková	Slovakia	1:41:32	
12	María Esther Sánchez	Mexico	1:42:16	
13	Zuzana Schindlerová	Czech Republic	1:43:14	
14	Claire Woods	Australia	1:45:07	
15	Svetlana Vasilyeva	Russia	1:46:09	
	Maja Landmann	Germany	DQ	
	Joyce Balle Baako	Uganda	DNS	
