= Sylwia Korzeniowska =

French race walker (born 1980)

Sylwia Korzeniowska (born 25 April 1980 in Tarnobrzeg) is a Polish-born French race walker. She changed her nationality in 2010. She is the younger sister of former world record holder Robert Korzeniowski.

== Achievements ==
Year	Competition	Venue	Position	Event	Notes
Representing Poland
2001	European U23 Championships	Amsterdam, Netherlands	5th	20 km	1:32:47
2001	European Race Walking Cup	Dudince, Slovakia	36th	20 km	1:39:01
2001	Universiade	Beijing, China	11th	10 km	47:54
2002	World Race Walking Cup	Turin, Italy	42nd	20 km	1:39:18
2003	European Race Walking Cup	Cheboksary, Russia	28th	20 km	1:34:43
2003	Universiade	Daegu, South Korea	–	20 km	DQ
2004	World Race Walking Cup	Naumburg, Germany	24th	20 km	1:31:30
2004	Olympic Games	Athens, Greece	21st	20 km	1:33:06
2006	World Race Walking Cup	A Coruña, Spain	15th	20 km	1:31:16 NR
2006	European Championships	Gothenburg, Sweden	7th	20 km	1:30:31 NR
2007	World Championships	Osaka, Japan	23rd	20 km	1:37.38
2008	Olympic Games	Beijing, China	20th	20 km	1:31.19
Representing France

== See also ==
- Polish records in athletics
