= Athletics at the 2003 Summer Universiade – Women's 20 kilometres walk =

The women's 20 kilometres walk event at the 2003 Summer Universiade was held on 25 August in Daegu, South Korea. This is the first time this event was contested at these games.

== Results ==
Rank	Athlete	Nationality	Time	Notes
1st place, gold medalist(s)	Tatyana Sibileva	Russia	1:34:55	
2nd place, silver medalist(s)	Jian Xingli	China	1:35:52	
3rd place, bronze medalist(s)	Tatyana Korotkova	Russia	1:36:52	
4	Sachiko Konishi	Japan	1:37:34	
5	Xue Ailing	China	1:39:46	
6	Carolina Jiménez	Spain	1:40:55	
7	Sofia Avoila	Portugal	1:41:06	
8	Fumi Mitsumura	Japan	1:49:05	
	Sylwia Korzeniowska	Poland	DQ	
	Valentyna Savchuk	Ukraine	DNS	
