= Barbora Dibelková =

Czech race walker

Barbora Dibelková (born 26 May 1983 in Čáslav) is a Czech race walker.

== Achievements ==
Year	Competition	Venue	Position	Event	Notes
Representing the Czech Republic
1999	World Youth Championships	Bydgoszcz, Poland	12th	5,000 m	24:43.76
2002	World Junior Championships	Kingston, Jamaica	8th	10,000 m	47:53.58
2003	European U23 Championships	Bydgoszcz, Poland	6th	20 km	1:39:22
2003	World Championships	Paris, France	21st	20 km	1:34:44
2004	Olympic Games	Athens, Greece	24th	20 km	1:33:37
2005	European U23 Championships	Erfurt, Germany	3rd	20 km	1:34:44
2005	World Championships	Helsinki, Finland	5th	20 km	1:29:05
2007	World Championships	Osaka, Japan	20th	20 km	1:36:45
