= 2007 Asian Athletics Championships – Women's 20 kilometres walk =

The women's 20 kilometres walk event at the 2007 Asian Athletics Championships was held in Amman, Jordan on July 25.

== Results ==
Rank	Name	Nationality	Time	Notes
1st place, gold medalist(s)	Jiang Qiuyan	China	1:36:16.9	
2nd place, silver medalist(s)	Bai Yanmin	China	1:38:10.6	
3rd place, bronze medalist(s)	Svetlana Tolstaya	Kazakhstan	1:41:53.0	
4	Yuan Yu Fang	Malaysia	1:51:28.0	
5	Rania Mohamed Othman	Syria	1:59:04.3	
