= Tatyana Shemyakina =

Russian racewalker

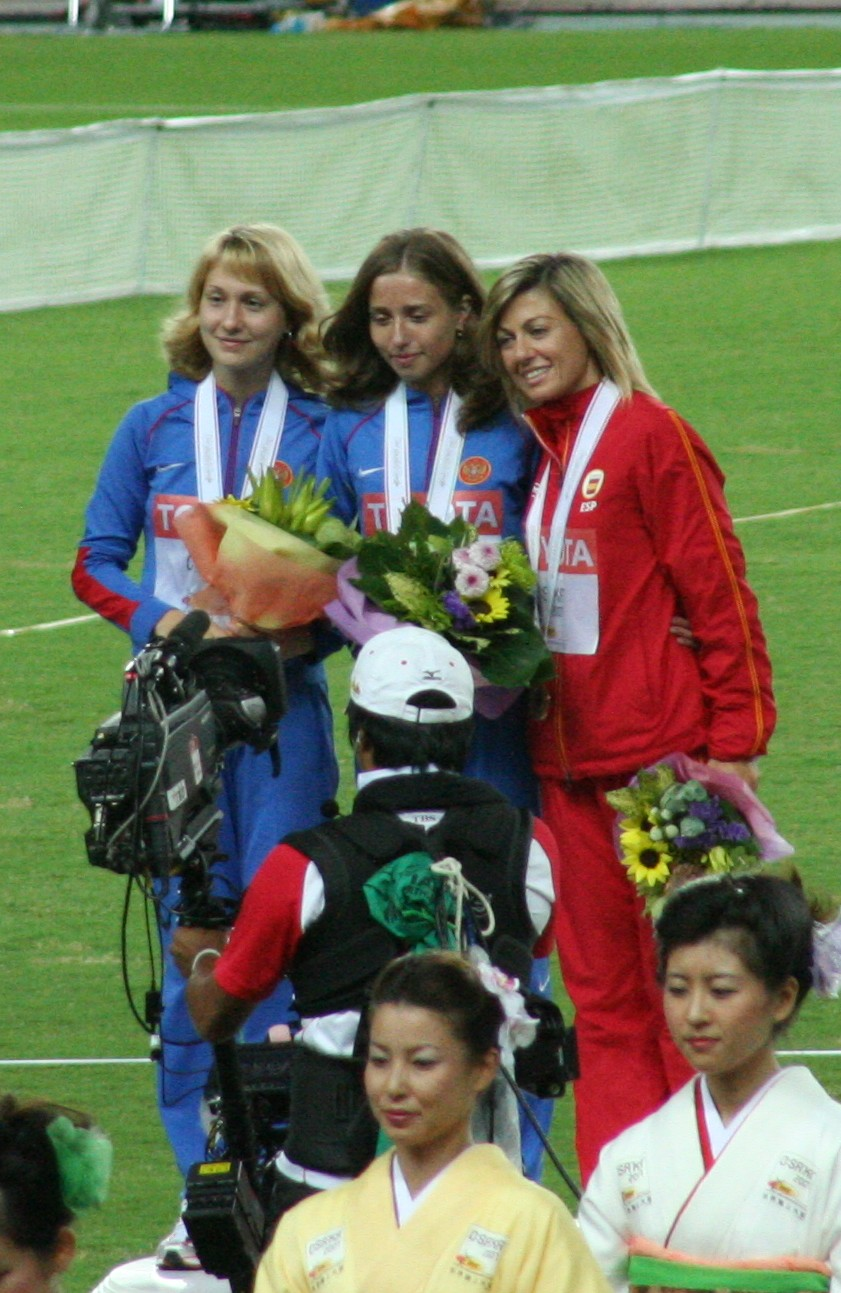
- Tatyana Shemyakina (on the left) in Osaka 2007.

Medal record

Women's athletics

Representing Russia

World Championships
Silver medal – second place	2007 Osaka	20 km walk

Universiade
Silver medal – second place	2011 Shenzhen	20 km walk

Tatyana Aleksandrovna Shemyakina (Russian: Татьяна Александровна Шемякина; born 3 September 1987) is a Russian race walker. She was born in Makarovka, Republic of Mordovia.

== Career ==
Her first international medal was a bronze over 10,000 m at the 2006 World Junior Championships in Athletics. Shemyakina won the silver medal at the 2007 World Championships in Osaka. She entered the 2008 IAAF World Race Walking Cup but failed to finish the distance. She is part of a training group coached by Viktor Chegin.

She was the 20 km champion at the 2007 European Athletics U23 Championships and went on to take the bronze medal at the 2009 European U23 Championships in Kaunas. She was the runner-up at the 2011 Summer Universiade.

She has not competed in the sport since February 2012.
