= Athanasia Tsoumeleka =

Greek racewalker (born 1982)

Personal information
- Born: 2 January 1982 (age 44) Preveza, Greece

Sport
- Country: Greece
- Sport: Athletics
- Event: 20 km walk

Achievements and titles
- Personal best: 1:29.12
Medal record
Olympic Games
Gold medal – first place	2004 Athens	20 km race walking

Athanasia Tsoumeleka (Greek: Αθανασία Τσουμελέκα, [aθanaˈsia tsumeˈleka]; born 2 January 1982 in Preveza, Greece) is a Greek race walker, who won a gold medal at the 2004 Summer Olympics in Athens. She was named the Greek Female Athlete of the Year for 2004.

Tsoumeleka gained notoriety in 2003 by placing seventh at the World Championships that year. She won the Olympic gold medal race held in her home country, beating Russia's Olimpiada Ivanova (silver medalist) and Australia's Jane Saville (bronze medalist).

In the 2008 Beijing Olympic Games, she finished 9th in 20 km walk. After the end of the Games, a urine sample she gave on August 6th tested positive for erythropoietin when subjected to a new test for CERA. Tsoumeleka expressed doubts about the validity of the procedure, and then announced her immediate retirement from the sport. On 29 April 2009 it was announced that Tsoumeleka had tested positive for CERA in a test on a blood sample provided during the 2008 Olympics. Her "B" sample also tested positive for CERA. On 18 November 2009 the International Olympic Committee decided to disqualify Tsoumeleka from the Women's 20 km Walk event of the 2008 Olympic Games where she placed 9th.

== Achievements ==
Year	Competition	Venue	Position	Event	Notes
Representing Greece
2000	World Junior Championships	Santiago, Chile	4th	10,000m	47:10.96
2002	European Championships	Munich, Germany	9th	20 km	1:31:25 SB
2003	European U23 Championships	Bydgoszcz, Poland	1st	20 km	1:33:55
2003	World Championships	Paris, France	7th	20 km	1:29:34 NR
2004	Olympic Games	Athens, Greece	1st	20 km	1:29.12 PB
2005	World Championships	Helsinki, Finland	—	20 km	DSQ
2008	World Race Walking Cup	Cheboksary, Russia	14th	20 km	1:30:40
2008	Olympic Games	Beijing, PR China	DSQ	20 km	~~1:27:54~~
