= Oceania Race Walking Championships =

Annual race walking competition

- Sport: Racewalking
- Founded: 2011
- Continent: Oceania (OAA)

The Oceania Race Walking Championships is an annual race walking competition not only for athletes representing countries from Oceania, organized by the Oceania Athletics Association (OAA). It was established in 2011 and has featured races for senior men and women (20 km), and for junior athletes (10 km). Until 2014, all events were held together with the Australian Race Walking Championships, and the senior 20 km events were part of the IAAF World Race Walking Challenge.

== Editions ==
	Year	City	Country	Date
I	2011	Hobart, Tasmania	Australia	19 February
II	2012	Hobart, Tasmania	Australia	25 February
III	2013	Hobart, Tasmania	Australia	24 February
IV	2014	Hobart, Tasmania	Australia	2 February
V	2015	Adelaide, South Australia	Australia	22 February
VI	2016	Adelaide, South Australia	Australia	21 February
VII	2017	Adelaide, South Australia	Australia	19 February
VIII	2018	Adelaide, South Australia	Australia	11 February

== Results ==
Complete results can be found on the IAAF, the OAA, and the Athletics Australia webpages. Results for the juniors can be found on the World Junior Athletics History site.

=== Men's Results ===
==== 20 kilometres ====
Year	Gold		Silver		Bronze	
2011	Jared Tallent (AUS)	1:20:19	Luke Adams (AUS)	1:21:00	Adam Rutter (AUS)	1:22:25
2012^{1.)}	Jared Tallent (AUS)	1:23:01	Christopher Erickson (AUS)	1:24:12	Adam Rutter (AUS)	1:26:04
2013	Jared Tallent (AUS)	1:22:10	Dane Bird-Smith (AUS)	1:22:27	Luke Adams (AUS)	1:23:48
2014	Dane Bird-Smith (AUS)	1:22:39	Chris Erickson (AUS)	1:25:23	Rhydian Cowley (AUS)	1:26:49
2015	Jared Tallent (AUS)	1:24:05	Quentin Rew (NZL)	1:25:22	Chris Erickson (AUS)	1:25:42
2016	Dane Bird-Smith (AUS)	1:20:04	Lebogang Shange (RSA)	1:20:06	Rhydian Cowley (AUS)	1:22:07
2017	Dane Bird-Smith (AUS)	1:19:37	Lebogang Shange (RSA)	1:21:00	Quentin Rew (NZL)	1:21:12
2018	Quentin Rew (NZL)	1:21:55	Dane Bird-Smith (AUS)	1:22:18	Michael Hosking (AUS)	1:23:10

^{1.)}: In 2012, Iñaki Gomez from Canada was 3rd in 1:24:46, and Evan Dunfee also from Canada was 4th in 1:25:17.

=== Women's Results ===
==== 20 kilometres ====
Year	Gold		Silver		Bronze	
2011	Claire Tallent (AUS)	1:33:38	Regan Lamble (AUS)	1:35:08	Nicole Fagan (AUS)	1:35:55
2012^{1.)}	Claire Tallent (AUS)	1:32:58	Regan Lamble (AUS)	1:36:52	Beki Lee (AUS)	1:39:16
2013	Tanya Holliday (AUS)	1:34:32	Cheryl Webb (AUS)	1:35:46	Rachel Tallent (AUS)	1:36:50
2014	Kelly Ruddick (AUS)	1:34:44	Stephanie Stigwood (AUS)	1:37:39	Rachel Tallent (AUS)	1:38:38
2015	Tanya Holliday (AUS)	1:34:05	Beki Lee (AUS)	1:34:35	Rachel Tallent (AUS)	1:35:03
2016	Rachel Tallent (AUS)	1:31:33	Tanya Holliday (AUS)	1:32:15	Beki Smith (AUS)	1:32:49
2017^{2.)}	Regan Lamble (AUS)	1:29:58	Beki Smith (AUS)	1:31:23	Jessica Pickles (AUS)	1:37:56
2018	Beki Smith (AUS)	1:31:23	Jemima Montag (AUS)	1:31:26	Claire Tallent (AUS)	1:31:29

^{1.)}: In 2012, Zuzana Schindlerová from Czech Republic was 3rd in 1:37:34. ^{2.)}: In 2017, Brigita Virbalyte-Dimšie from Lithuania was 2nd in 1:30:55.

=== Junior (U-20) Boys' Results ===
==== 10 kilometres ====
Year	Gold		Silver		Bronze	
2011 (Exhibition)	Dane Bird-Smith (AUS)	40:56	Brad Aiton (AUS)	44:09	Nicholas Dewar (AUS)	45:09
2012	Blake Steele (AUS)	43:46	Nathan Brill (AUS)	46:02	Jesse Osborne (AUS)	47:12
2013	Brad Aiton (AUS)	43:27	Nathan Brill (AUS)	43:46	Harry Bates (AUS)	47:46
2014	Jesse Osborne (AUS)	41:27	Nathan Brill (AUS)	42:46	Tyler Jones (AUS)	45:39
2015	Tyler Jones (AUS)	44:08	Kyle Swan (AUS)	44:20	Adam Garganis (AUS)	46:18
2016	Tyler Jones (AUS)	42:22	Kyle Swan (AUS)	42:48	Adam Garganis (AUS)	42:53

=== Junior (U-20) Girls' Results ===
==== 10 kilometres ====
Year	Gold		Silver		Bronze	
2011 (Exhibition) ^{1.)}	Rachel Tallent (AUS)	48:40	Beth Alexander (AUS)	49:48	Amelia Finnegan (AUS)	54:33
2012	Rachel Tallent (AUS)	49:28	Jessica Pickles (AUS)	52:45	Shannon Jennings (AUS)	54:25
2013	Jessica Pickles (AUS)	49:34	Kirsty Klein (AUS)	49:57	Amy Bettiol (AUS)	51:49
2014	Jemima Montag (AUS)	47:00	Clara Smith (AUS)	48:17	Jasmine Dighton (AUS)	49:11
2015	Danielle Walsh (AUS)	53:32	Stephanie George (AUS)	53:40	Anna Cross (AUS)	54:46
2016	Zoe Hunt (AUS)	46:29	Clara Smith (AUS)	46:42	Tayla-Paige Billington (AUS)	47:25

^{1.)}: In 2011, Lauren Whelan from United Kingdom was 3rd in 51:15.

== See also ==
- IAAF World Race Walking Cup
  - Asian Race Walking Championships
  - European Race Walking Cup
  - Pan American Race Walking Cup
    - Central American Race Walking Championships
    - South American Race Walking Championships
