= 2017 in the sport of athletics =

2017 in athletics
- Major world events: 2017 World Championships

In 2017, the foremost athletics event was the World Championships in London. The other major global-level competition in 2017 was the World Cross Country Championships.

== Major championships ==
=== World ===
- World Championships
- World U18 Championships
- World Cross Country Championships
- World Relays
- World Mountain Running Championships
- World Long Distance Mountain Running Championships
- World Masters Indoor Championships
- World Para Championships
- IAU 50 km World Championships
- IAU 24 Hour World Championships
- IAU Trail World Championships
- Universiade
- World Police and Fire Games
- Commonwealth Youth Games

=== Regional ===
- African U20 Championships
- Arab Championships
- Asian Championships
- Asian Marathon Championships
- Asian Race Walking Championships
- Asian Youth Championships
- Jeux de la Francophonie
- Southeast Asian Games
- ASEAN Para Games
- Asian Indoor and Martial Arts Games
- Islamic Solidarity Games
- Maccabiah Games
- Island Games
- Pacific Mini Games
- Asian Youth Games (postponed)
- East Asian Games (postponed)
- European Athletics U23 Championships
- European Athletics U20 Championships
- European Cross Country Championships
- European Cup Combined Events
- European Throwing Cup
- European Cup 10,000m
- European Indoor Championships
- European Mountain Running Championships
- European Race Walking Cup
- European Team Championships
- Balkan Championships
- Games of the Small States of Europe
- European Youth Olympic Festival
- Mediterranean Games (postponed)
- Bolivarian Games
- Central American and Caribbean Age Group Championships
- Central American and Caribbean Championships
- Central American and Caribbean Junior Championships
- CARIFTA Games
- NACAC Age Group Championships
- NACAC Combined Events Championships
- NACAC Cross Country Championships
- NACAC Race Walking Championships
- NACAC U20 Championships
- Pan American U20 Championships
- Pan American Race Walking Cup
- South American Championships
- South American Cross Country Championships
- South American Half Marathon Championships
- South American U20 Championships
- South American Marathon Championships
- South American Mountain Running Championships
- South American Road Mile Championships
- South American Trail Championships

== Seasonal events ==
- Diamond League
- IAAF Hammer Throw Challenge
- IAAF Combined Events Challenge
- IAAF Race Walking Challenge
- World Marathon Majors
  - Tokyo
  - Boston
  - London
  - Berlin
  - Chicago
  - New York City
  - World Championships men's marathon/World Championships women's marathon
- IAAF Label Road Races

== World records ==
=== Indoor ===
Event	Athlete	Nation	Result	Location	Date
Men's 300 metres	Noah Lyles	United States	31.87 (Note: Not a world record as the indoor 300 metres is not an IAAF event; it is however a world best)	Albuquerque, New Mexico, United States	4 March
Men's 600 metres	Casimir Loxsom	United States	1:14.91 (Note: Not a world record as the indoor 600 metres is not an IAAF event; it is however a world best)	University Park, Pennsylvania, United States	27 January
Men's marathon	Christopher Zablocki	United States	2:21:48 (Note: Not a world record as the indoor marathon is not an IAAF event; it is however a world best)	New York City, United States	25 March
Men's 300 metres hurdles	Karsten Warholm	Norway	34.92 (Note: Not a world record as the indoor 300 metres hurdles is not an IAAF event; it is however a world best)	Tampere, Finland	11 February
Men's 4×1 mile relay	Donn Cabral, Ford Palmer, Graham Crawford, Kyle Merber	United States	16:12.81 (Note: Not a world record as the indoor 4×1 mile relay is not an IAAF event; it is however a world best)	New York City, United States	18 February
Women's 2000 metres	Genzebe Dibaba	Ethiopia	5:23.75	Sabadell, Spain	7 February
Women's marathon	Laura Manninen	Finland	2:42:30 (Note: Not a world record as the indoor marathon is not an IAAF event; it is however a world best)	New York City, United States	25 March
Women's weight throw	Gwen Berry	United States	25.60A (Note: Not a world record as the indoor weight throw is not an IAAF event; it is however a world best)	Albuquerque, New Mexico, United States	4 March
Women's distance medley relay	Emma Coburn, Sydney McLaughlin, Brenda Martinez, Jenny Simpson	United States	10:40.31 (Note: Not a world record as the indoor distance medley relay is not an IAAF event; it is however a world best)	Boston, Massachusetts, United States	28 January

=== Outdoor ===
Event	Athlete	Nation	Result	Location	Date
Men's marathon	Eliud Kipchoge	Kenya	2:00:25 (Note: This performance is the fastest marathon ever, though not eligible for official ratification due to the use of in-out pacemakers)	Monza, Italy	6 May
Women's 200 metres hurdles (bend)	Lauren Wells	Australia	25.79 (Note: Not a world record as the 200 metres hurdles is not an IAAF event; it is however a world best)	Canberra, Australia	21 January
Women's 2000 metres	Genzebe Dibaba	Ethiopia	5:23.75i (Note: This performance was indoors, but superseded the outdoor mark and so is the overall world record)	Sabadell, Spain	7 February
Women's 10 km (road)	Joyciline Jepkosgei	Kenya	30:04+	Prague, Czech Republic	1 April
Women's 15 km (road)	Joyciline Jepkosgei	Kenya	45:37+	Prague, Czech Republic	1 April
Women's 20 km (road)	Peres Jepchirchir	Kenya	1:01:40+	Ras Al-Khaimah, United Arab Emirates	10 February
Women's 20 km (road)	Joyciline Jepkosgei	Kenya	1:01:25+	Prague, Czech Republic	1 April
Women's half marathon	Peres Jepchirchir	Kenya	1:05:06	Ras Al-Khaimah, United Arab Emirates	10 February
Women's half marathon	Joyciline Jepkosgei	Kenya	1:04:52	Prague, Czech Republic	1 April
Women's 25 km (road)	Mary Jepkosgei Keitany	Kenya	1:19:43+	London, United Kingdom	23 April
Women's 30 km (road)	Mary Jepkosgei Keitany	Kenya	1:36:05+	London, United Kingdom	23 April
Women's marathon	Mary Jepkosgei Keitany	Kenya	2:17:01	London, United Kingdom	23 April
Women's 50 km race walk	Inês Henriques	Portugal	4:08:26	Porto de Mós, Portugal	15 January
Women's sprint medley relay	Morolake Akinosun, English Gardner, Dezerea Bryant, Miki Barber	United States	1:35.59 (Note: Not a world record as the sprint medley relay is not an IAAF event; it is however a world best)	Philadelphia, Pennsylvania, United States	29 April

== Awards ==
=== Men ===
Award	Winner
IAAF World Athlete of the Year	Mutaz Essa Barshim (QAT)
Track & Field News Athlete of the Year	Mutaz Essa Barshim (QAT)
European Athlete of the Year	Johannes Vetter (GER)
European Athletics Rising Star	Karsten Warholm (NOR)
The Bowerman	Christian Coleman (USA)

=== Women ===
Award	Winner
IAAF World Athlete of the Year	Nafissatou Thiam (BEL)
Track & Field Athlete of the Year	Anita Włodarczyk (POL)
European Athlete of the Year	Katerina Stefanidi (GRE)
European Athletics Rising Star	Yuliya Levchenko (UKR)
The Bowerman	Raevyn Rogers (USA)

== Season's bests ==
Best marks of the year
Event	Men			Women		
Event	Athlete	Mark	Notes	Athlete	Mark	Notes
60 metres	Ronnie Baker (USA) Christian Coleman (USA)	6.45	Tie	Elaine Thompson (JAM)	6.98	
100 metres	Christian Coleman (USA)	9.82		Elaine Thompson (JAM)	10.71	
200 metres	Isaac Makwala (BOT)	19.77		Tori Bowie (USA)	21.77	
400 metres	Wayde van Niekerk (RSA)	43.62		Shaunae Miller-Uibo (BAH)	49.46	
800 metres	Emmanuel Kipkurui Korir (KEN)	1:43.10		Caster Semenya (RSA)	1:55.16	
1500 metres	Elijah Motonei Manangoi (KEN)	3:28.80		Sifan Hassan (NED)	3:56.14	
3000 metres	Ronald Kwemoi (KEN)	7:28.73		Hellen Onsando Obiri (KEN)	8:23.14	
5000 metres	Muktar Edris (ETH)	12:55.23		Hellen Onsando Obiri (KEN)	14:18.37	
10,000 metres	Mohamed Farah (GBR)	26:49.51		Almaz Ayana (ETH)	30:16.32	
60 metres hurdles	Andrew Pozzi (GBR)	7.43		Kendra Harrison (USA)	7.74 A	
100/110 metres hurdles	Omar McLeod (JAM)	12.90		Kendra Harrison (USA)	12.28	
400 metres hurdles	Kyron McMaster (IVB)	47.80		Dalilah Muhammad (USA)	52.64	
3000 metres steeplechase	Evan Jager (USA)	8:01.29		Ruth Jebet (BHR)	8:55.29	
10 kilometres	Benard Kimeli (KEN)	27:10		Joyciline Jepkosgei (KEN)	29:43	
15 kilometres	Joshua Kiprui Cheptegei (KEN)	41:16		Joyciline Jepkosgei (KEN)	45:37	
20 kilometres	Alex Oloitiptip Korio (KEN) Jorum Lumbasi Okombo (KEN) Abraham Naibei Cheroben (BHR)	55:51	Tie	Joyciline Jepkosgei (KEN)	1:01:25	
Half marathon	Abraham Naibei Cheroben (BHR)	58:40		Joyciline Jepkosgei (KEN)	1:04:51	
25 kilometres	Nicholas Kipchirchir Korir (KEN) Cosmas Jairus Birech (KEN) Barselius Kipyego (KEN)	1:12:46	Tie	Valary Jemeli Aiyabei (KEN)	1:21:23	
30 kilometres	Eliud Kipchoge (KEN) Guye Adola (ETH)	1:27:24	Tie	Mary Jepkosgei Keitany (KEN)	1:36:05	
Marathon	Eliud Kipchoge (KEN)	2:03:32		Mary Jepkosgei Keitany (KEN)	2:17:01	
100 kilometres run	Tatsuya Itagaki (JPN)	6:14:18		Nikolina Sustic (CRO) Nele Alder-Baerens (GER)	7:34:36	
20 kilometres race walk	Wang Kaihua (CHN)	1:17:54		Elena Lashmanova (RUS)	1:25:18	
50 kilometres race walk	Yohann Diniz (FRA)	3:33:12		Inês Henriques (POR)	4:05:56	
Pole vault	Sam Kendricks (USA)	6.00 m		Ekateríni Stefanídi (GRE)	4.91 m	
High jump	Mutaz Essa Barshim (QAT)	2.40 m		Mariya Lasitskene (ANA)	2.06 m	
Long jump	Luvo Manyonga (RSA)	8.65 m		Brittney Reese (USA)	7.13 m	+2.0
Triple jump	Christian Taylor (USA)	18.11 m		Yulimar Rojas (VEN)	14.96 m	-0.3
Shot put	Ryan Crouser (USA)	22.65 m		Lijiao Gong (CHN)	20.11 m	
Discus throw	Daniel Ståhl (SWE)	71.29 m		Sandra Perković (CRO)	71.41 m	
Javelin throw	Johannes Vetter (GER)	94.44 m		Sara Kolak (CRO)	68.43 m	
Hammer throw	Pawel Fajdek (POL)	83.44 m		Anita Włodarczyk (POL)	82.87 m	
Pentathlon	—			Nafissatou Thiam (BEL)	4870 pts	
Heptathlon	Kevin Mayer (FRA)	6479 pts		Nafissatou Thiam (BEL)	7013 pts	
Decathlon	Kevin Mayer (FRA)	8768 pts		—		
4 × 100 metres relay	Great Britain (GBR); Chijindu Ujah; Adam Gemili; Daniel Talbot; Nethaneel Mitchell-Blake	37.47		United States (USA); Aaliyah Brown; Allyson Felix; Morolake Akinosun; Tori Bowie	41.82	
4 × 400 metres relay	Trinidad and Tobago (TTO); Jarrin Solomon; Jereem Richards; Machel Cedenio; Lalonde Gordon	2:58.12		United States (USA); Quanera Hayes; Allyson Felix; Shakima Wimbley; Phyllis Francis	3:19.02	

== Detailed results ==
=== International Association of Athletics Federations (IAAF) ===
==== 2017 World athletics championships ====
- March 26: 2017 IAAF World Cross Country Championships in (Uganda) Kampala
  - Senior individual winners: (Kenya) Geoffrey Kipsang Kamworor (m) / (Kenya) Irene Chepet Cheptai (f)
  - Senior team winners: Ethiopia (m) / Kenya (f)
  - U20 individual winners: (Uganda) Jacob Kiplimo (m) / (Ethiopia) Letesenbet Gidey (f)
  - U20 team winners: Ethiopia (m) / Ethiopia (f)
  - Mixed Relay winners: Kenya (Asbel Kiprop, Winfred Nzisa Mbithe, Bernard Kipkorir Koros, & Beatrice Chepkoech)
- April 22 & 23: 2017 IAAF World Relays in (The Bahamas) Nassau
  - 4 × 100 m relay winners: United States (m) / Germany (f)
  - 4 × 200 m relay winners: Canada (m) / Jamaica (f)
  - 4 × 400 m relay winners: United States (m) / United States (f)
  - 4 × 800 m relay winners: United States (m) / United States (f)
  - Mixed 4 × 400 m relay winners: Bahamas
- July 12–16: 2017 World U18 Championships in Athletics in Nairobi
  - South Africa, China, and Cuba won 5 gold medals each. Kenya won the overall medal tally.
- July 14–23: 2017 World Para Athletics Championships in (United Kingdom) London
  - China won both the gold and overall medal tallies.
- August 4–13: 2017 World Championships in Athletics in (United Kingdom) London
  - The United States won both the gold and overall medal tallies.

==== 2017 World Marathon Majors ====
- February 26: 2017 Tokyo Marathon
  - Winners: (Kenya) Wilson Kipsang (m) / (Kenya) Sarah Chepchirchir (f)
- April 17: 2017 Boston Marathon
  - Winners: (Kenya) Geoffrey Kirui (m) / (Kenya) Edna Kiplagat (f)
- April 23: 2017 London Marathon
  - Winners: (Kenya) Daniel Wanjiru (m) / (Kenya) Mary Keitany (f)
- August 6: Part of the 2017 World Championships in Athletics (Men / Women) in (United Kingdom) London
  - Winners: (Kenya) Geoffrey Kirui (m) / (Bahrain) Rose Chelimo (f)
- September 24: 2017 Berlin Marathon
  - Winners: (Kenya) Eliud Kipchoge (m) / (Kenya) Gladys Cherono Kiprono (f)
- October 8: 2017 Chicago Marathon
  - Winners: (United States) Galen Rupp (m) / (Ethiopia) Tirunesh Dibaba (f)
- November 5: 2017 New York City Marathon
  - Winners: (Kenya) Geoffrey Kipsang Kamworor (m) / (United States) Shalane Flanagan (f)

==== 2017 IAAF Road Race Label Events (Gold) ====
- January 2: (China) Xiamen International Marathon
  - Winners: (Ethiopia) Lemi Berhanu Hayle (m) / (Ethiopia) Meseret Mengistu (f)
- January 20: (United Arab Emirates) Dubai Marathon
  - Winners: (Ethiopia) Tamirat Tola (m) / (Ethiopia) Worknesh Degefa (f)
- February 12: Hong Kong Marathon
  - Winners: (Ethiopia) Melaku Belachew (m) (Ethiopia) Gulume Tollesa (f)
- February 26: (Puerto Rico) World's Best 10K
  - Winners: (United States) Sam Chelanga (m) / (Kenya) Mary Wacera Ngugi (f)
- March 5: (Japan) Lake Biwa Marathon (men only)
  - Winner: (Kenya) Ezekiel Kiptoo Chebii
- March 12: (Japan) Nagoya Women's Marathon (women only)
  - Winner: (Bahrain) Eunice Kirwa
- March 12: (Italy) Roma-Ostia Half Marathon
  - Winners: (Ethiopia) Guye Adola (m) / (Kenya) Gladys Cherono Kiprono (f)
- March 19: (Portugal) Lisbon Half Marathon
  - Winners: (New Zealand) Jake Robertson (m) / (Ethiopia) Mare Dibaba (f)
- March 19: (South Korea) Seoul International Marathon
  - Winners: (Kenya) Amos Kipruto (m) / (Kenya) Margaret Agai (f)
- April 1: (Czech Republic) Prague Half Marathon
  - Winners: (Ethiopia) Tamirat Tola (m) / (Kenya) Joyciline Jepkosgei (f)
- April 9: (France) Paris Marathon
  - Winners: (Kenya) Paul Lonyangata (m) / (Kenya) Purity Rionoripo (f)
- April 9: (Netherlands) Rotterdam Marathon
  - Winners: (Kenya) Marius Kimutai (m) / (Ethiopia) Meskerem Assefa (f)
- April 23: (Japan) Gifu Seiryu Half Marathon
  - Winners: (Kenya) Alexander Mutiso (m) / (Kenya) Joyciline Jepkosgei (f)
- April 23: (Austria) Vienna City Marathon
  - Winners: (Kenya) Albert Korir (m) / (Kenya) Nancy Kiprop (f)
- April 23: (China) Yangzhou Jianzhen International Half Marathon
  - Winners: (Ethiopia) Mosinet Geremew (m) / (Ethiopia) Sutume Asefa (f)
- April 23: (Spain) Madrid Marathon
  - Winners: (Ethiopia) Bonsa Dida (m) / (Kenya) Elizabeth Rumokol (f)
- April 30: (Turkey) Istanbul Half Marathon
  - Winners: (Tanzania) Ismail Juma (m) / (Kenya) Ruth Chepngetich (f)
- May 7: (Czech Republic) Prague Marathon
  - Winners: (Ethiopia) Gebretsadik Abraha (m) / (Kenya) Valary Aiyabei (f)
- May 7: (China) Yellow River Estuary International Marathon
  - Winners: (Ethiopia) Husen Muhammedahin Esmael (m) / (Ethiopia) Letebrhan Haylay Gebreslase (f)
- May 20: (Czech Republic) Mattoni Karlovy Vary Half Marathon
  - Winners: (Kenya) Wilfred Kimitei (m) / (Kenya) Yvonne Jelagat (f)
- May 27 & 28: (Canada) Ottawa Race Weekend
  - 10 km winners: (Ethiopia) Leul Gebresilase (m) / (Ethiopia) Netsanet Gudeta (f)
  - Marathon winners: (Kenya) Eliud Kiptanui (m) / (Ethiopia) Guteni Imana (f)
- June 3: (Czech Republic) České Budějovice Half Marathon
  - Winners: (Kenya) Justus Kangogo (m) / (Kenya) Agnes Jeruto Barsosio (f)
- June 24: (Czech Republic) Olomouc Half Marathon
  - Winners: (Kenya) Josphat Kiprop Kiptis (m) / (Ethiopia) Worknesh Degefa (f)
- July 2: (Australia) Gold Coast Marathon
  - Winners: (Japan) Takuya Noguchi (m) / (Ethiopia) Abebe Afework (f)
- July 30: (Colombia) Bogotá Half Marathon
  - Winners: (Ethiopia) Feyisa Lilesa (m) / (Kenya) Brigid Jepchirchir Kosgei (f)
- September 9: (Czech Republic) Prague Grand Prix
  - Winners: (Kenya) Benard Kimeli (m) / (Kenya) Joyciline Jepkosgei (f) (World Record)
- September 16: (Czech Republic) Ústí nad Labem Half Marathon
  - Winners: (Kenya) Barselius Kipyego (m) / (Kenya) Violah Jepchumba (f)
- September 17: (Australia) Sydney Marathon
  - Winners: (Japan) Shota Hattori (m) / (Ethiopia) Makda Harun (f)
- September 17: (Denmark) Copenhagen Half Marathon
  - Winners: (Bahrain) Abraham Cheroben (m) / (Bahrain) Eunice Chumba (f)
- September 17: (China) Beijing Marathon
  - Winners: (Morocco) Salah-Eddine Bounasr (m) / (Ethiopia) Meselech Beyene (f)
- September 17: (South Africa) Cape Town Marathon
  - Winners: (Ethiopia) Asefa Mengstu (m) / (Ethiopia) Betelhem Moges (f)
- October 15: (Netherlands) Amsterdam Marathon
  - Winners: (Kenya) Lawrence Cherono (m) / (Ethiopia) Tadelech Bekele (f)
- October 15: (Portugal) Rock 'n' Roll Lisbon Half Marathon Santander Totta RTP
  - Winners: (Ethiopia) Birhan Nebebew (m) / (Bahrain) Eunice Chumba (f)
- October 15: (Portugal) Rock 'n' Roll Lisbon Marathon EDP
  - Winners: (Kenya) Ishhimael Bushendich Chemtan (m) / (Kenya) Sarah Chepchirchir (f)
- October 22: (Canada) Toronto Waterfront Marathon
  - Winners: (Kenya) Philemon Rono (m) / (Ethiopia) Marta Megra Lema (f)
- October 22: (Spain) Valencia Half Marathon
  - Winners: (Bahrain) Abraham Cheroben (m) / (Kenya) Joyciline Jepkosgei (f)
- October 29: (Germany) Frankfurt Marathon
  - Winners: (Ethiopia) Shura Kitata Tola (m) / (Kenya) Vivian Cheruiyot (f)
- November 12: (China) Shanghai Marathon
  - Winners: (South Africa) Stephen Mokoka (m) / (Ethiopia) Roza Dereje (f)
- November 12: (Turkey) Istanbul Marathon
  - Winners: (France) Abraham Kiprotich (m) / (Kenya) Ruth Chepngetich (f)
- November 19: (Spain) Maratón Valencia Trinidad Alfonso EDP
  - Winners: (Kenya) Sammy Kitwara (m) / (Ethiopia) Aberu Mekuria (f)
- November 19: (India) Delhi Half Marathon
  - Winners: (Ethiopia) Birhanu Legese (m) / (Ethiopia) Almaz Ayana (f)
- December 3: (Japan) Fukuoka Marathon (men only)
  - Winner: (Norway) Sondre Nordstad Moen
- December 3: Singapore Marathon (final)
  - Winners: (Kenya) Cosmas Koech Kimutai (m) / (Kenya) Pamela Rotich (f)

==== 2017 IAAF Road Race Label Events (Silver) ====
- January 15: (United States) Houston Marathon
  - Winners: (Kenya) Dominic Ondoro (m) / (Ethiopia) Meskerem Assefa (f)
- January 29: (Japan) Osaka International Ladies Marathon (women only)
  - Winner: (Japan) Risa Shigetomo
- February 5: (Japan) Kagawa Marugame Half Marathon
  - Winners: (United Kingdom) Callum Hawkins (m) / (Bahrain) Eunice Kirwa (f)
- February 12: (Spain) Mitja Marató de Barcelona
  - Winners: (Kenya) Leonard Langat (m) / (Kenya) Florence Kiplagat (f)
- February 19: (Spain) Seville Marathon
  - Winners: (Kenya) Titus Ekiru (m) / (Spain) Paula González Berodia (f)
- March 19: (China) Chongqing International Marathon
  - Winners: (Ethiopia) Afewerk Mesfin (m) / (Kenya) Nguriatukei Rael Kiyara (f)
- April 2: (South Korea) Daegu Marathon
  - Winners: (Kenya) Mathew Kisorio (m) / (Kenya) Pamela Jepkosgei Rotich (f)
- April 2: (Italy) Rome Marathon
  - Winners: (Ethiopia) Shura Kitata (m) / (Ethiopia) Rahma Tusa (f)
- April 9: (Germany) Hannover Marathon
  - Winners: (Kenya) Allan Kiprono (m) / (Germany) Fate Tola (f)
- April 23: (Poland) DOZ Marathon Łódź with PZU
  - Winners: (Kenya) Samson Barmao (m) / (Algeria) Kenza Dahmani (f)
- April 23: (Poland) Orlen Warsaw Marathon
  - Winners: (Kenya) Felix Kimutai (m) / (Belarus) Nastassia Ivanova (f)
- June 11: (China) Lanzhou International Marathon
  - Winners: (Ethiopia) Kelkile Gezahegn (m) / (Ethiopia) Ashete Bekere (f)
- September 17: (Netherlands) Dam tot Damloop
  - Winners: (Ethiopia) Birhanu Legese (m) / (Uganda) Mercyline Chelangat (f)
- October 1: (United Kingdom) Cardiff Half Marathon
  - Winners: (Kenya) John Lotiang (m) / (Kenya) Edith Chelimo (f)
- October 29: (France) Marseille-Cassis Classique Internationale
  - Winners: (Ethiopia) Jemal Yimer (m) / (Kenya) Edith Chelimo (f)
- November 12: (Japan) Saitama International Marathon (women only)
  - Winner: (Kenya) Flomena Cheyech Daniel
- November 12: (Lebanon) Beirut Marathon
  - Winners: (Kenya) Dominic Ruto (m) / (Bahrain) Eunice Chumba (f)
- December 10: (China) Guangzhou Marathon
  - Winners: (Kenya) Dickson Kipsang Tuwei (m) / (Ethiopia) Rahma Tusa (f)
- December 31: (France) Corrida de Houilles (co-final)
  - Winners: (Switzerland) Julien Wanders (m) / (Kenya) Stacey Ndiwa (f)
- December 31: (Spain) San Silvestre Vallecana (co-final)
  - Winners: (Kenya) Erick Kiptanui (m) / (Ethiopia) Gelete Burka (f)

==== 2017 IAAF Road Race Label Events (Bronze) ====
- January 15: (United States) Houston Half Marathon
  - Winners: (United States) Leonard Essau Korir (m) / (Kenya) Veronica Nyaruai (f)
- January 22: (Spain) Mitja Marató Internacional Vila de Santa Pola
  - Winners: (Kenya) Peter Cheruiyot Kirui (m) / (Kenya) Antonina Kwambai (f)
- March 12: (Spain) Barcelona Marathon
  - Winners: (Kenya) Jonah Kipkemoi Chesum (m) / (Ethiopia) Helen Bekele (f)
- March 19: (Chinese Taipei) New Taipei City Wan Jin Shi Marathon
  - Winners: (Kenya) Hillary Yego (m) / (Mongolia) Munkhzaya Bayartsogt (f)
- March 19: (Poland) ONICO Gdynia Half Marathon
  - Winners: (Kenya) Hillary Maiyo (m) / (Morocco) Fatiha Benchatki (f)
- March 26: (Poland) Warsaw Half Marathon
  - Winners: (Kenya) John Lotiang (m) / (Ethiopia) Ayantu Gemechu (f)
- April 2: (Italy) Milano City Marathon
  - Winners: (Kenya) Edwin Kipngetich Koech (m) / (Kenya) Sheila Chepkoech (f)
- April 2: (Chile) Santiago Marathon
  - Winners: (Kenya) Luka Rotich Lobuwan (m) / (Peru) Inés Melchor (f)
- April 9: (North Korea) Pyongyang Marathon
  - Winners: (North Korea) Pak Chol (m) / (North Korea) JO Un Ok (f)
- April 16: (Japan) Nagano Olympic Commemorative Marathon
  - Winners: (Japan) Taiga Ito (m) / (Kenya) Rachel Jemutai Mutgaa (f)
- May 7: (Switzerland) Geneva Marathon
  - Winners: (Kenya) William Yegon (m) / (Ethiopia) Motu Megersa (f)
- May 13: (Nigeria) Okpekpe Intn'l 10 km Road Race
  - Winners: (Ethiopia) Leul Gebresilase (m) / (Ethiopia) Azemra Gebru (f)
- May 14: (Latvia) Riga Marathon
  - Winners: (Kenya) Joseph Kyengo Munywoki (m) / (Ethiopia) Bekelech Daba (f)
- May 21: (India) Tata Consultancy Services World 10K Bengaluru
  - Winners: (Kenya) Alex Korio (m) / (Kenya) Irene Chepet Cheptai (f)
- May 28: (United Kingdom) Edinburgh Marathon
  - Winners: (Kenya) Julius Kiplagat Korir (m) / (Kenya) Eddah Jepkosgei (f)
- June 17: (France) Corrida de Langueux
  - Winners: (Bahrain) Dawit Fikadu (m) / (Ethiopia) Birhane Mihretu (f)
- June 24: (Bosnia and Herzegovina) Vidovdan Road Race
  - Winners: (Ethiopia) Lencho Tesfaye Anbesa (m) / (Ethiopia) Belaynesh Tsegaye Beyene (f)
- August 27: Mexico City Marathon
  - Winners: (Ethiopia) Fikadu Kebede Debele (m) / (Peru) Gladys Tejeda (f)
- September 10: (Belarus) Minsk Half Marathon
  - Winners: (Kenya) Hillary Kiptum Maiyo (m) / (Belarus) Lyudmyla Liakhovich (f)
- September 10: (China) Taiyuan International Marathon
  - Winners: (Ethiopia) Azmeraw Bekele (m) / (Kenya) Chemtai Rionotukei (f)
- September 24: (Poland) Warsaw Marathon
  - Winners: (Poland) Blazej Brzezinski (m) / (Ethiopia) Bekelu Beji (f)
- September 30: (China) Hengshui Lake International Marathon
  - Winners: (Kenya) Michael Njenga Kunyuga (m) / (Kenya) Betty Wilson Lempus (f)
- October 1: (Slovakia) Košice Peace Marathon
  - Winners: (Kenya) Reuben Kerio (m) / (Kenya) Sheila Jerotich (f)
- October 8: (United Kingdom) Bournemouth Marathon
  - Winners: (Poland) Jacek Cieluszecki (m) / (United Kingdom) Laura Trimble (f)
- October 8: (France) 20 Kilomètres de Paris
  - Winners: (Kenya) Collins Chebii (m) / (Ethiopia) Gebayanesh Ayele (f)
- October 22: (Italy) Venice Marathon
  - Winners: (Italy) Eyob Gebrehiwet (m) / (Ethiopia) Gedo Sule Utura (f)
- October 29: (Slovenia) Ljubljana Marathon
  - Winners: (Kenya) Marius Kimutai (m) / (Ethiopia) Shuko Genemo Wote (f)
- November 5: (France) French Riviera Marathon
  - Winners: (Ethiopia) Dejene Kelkilew (m) / (Ethiopia) Tejitu Siyum (f)
- November 5: (China) Hangzhou Marathon
  - Winners: (Ethiopia) Azmeraw Bekele (m) / (Ethiopia) Muluhabt Tsega (f)
- November 19: (France) Boulogne-Billancourt Half Marathon
  - Winners: (Eritrea) Hiskel Tewelde (m) / (Ethiopia) Rahma Tusa (f)
- November 26: (Italy) Florence Marathon
  - Winners: (Bahrain) Zelalem Bacha (m) / (Ethiopia) Dire Tune (f)
- December 3: Marathon du Gabon
  - Winners: (Kenya) Peter Kurui (m) / (Kenya) Joan Kigen (f)
- December 17: (China) Shenzhen Marathon (final)
  - Winners: (Kenya) Peter Kimeli Some (m) / (Kyrgyzstan) Viktoriia Poliudina (f)

==== 2017 IAAF Diamond League ====
- May 5: Doha Diamond League in (Qatar) Doha
  - The United States and Kenya won 3 gold medals each. The United States won the overall medal tally.
- May 13: IAAF Diamond League Shanghai in (China) Shanghai
  - The United States and Kenya won 3 gold medals each. The United States won the overall medal tally.
- May 27: Prefontaine Classic in Eugene, Oregon
  - The United States won both the gold and overall medal tallies.
- June 8: Golden Gala Pietro Mennea in (Italy) Rome
  - The United States, Kenya, and the Netherlands won 2 gold medals each. The United States won the overall medal tally.
- June 15: Bislett Games in (Norway) Oslo
  - 13 nations won a gold medal each. Great Britain, Kenya, Germany, and Cuba won 3 overall medals each.
- June 18: Stockholm Bauhaus Athletics in Stockholm
  - 13 nations won a gold medal each. Sweden won the overall medal tally.
- July 1: Meeting de Paris in (France) Saint-Denis
  - Jamaica won the gold medal tally. Kenya won the overall medal tally.
- July 6: Athletissima in (Switzerland) Lausanne
  - The United States won both the gold and overall medal tallies.
- July 9: London Grand Prix in (United Kingdom) London
  - The United States won both the gold and overall medal tallies.
- July 16: Meeting International Mohammed VI d'Athlétisme de Rabat in Rabat
  - Morocco won the gold medal tally. Morocco and the United States won 8 overall medals each.
- July 21: Herculis in Monaco
  - The United States won both the gold and overall medal tallies.
- August 20: British Grand Prix in (United Kingdom) Birmingham
  - Great Britain won both the gold and overall medal tallies.
- August 24: Weltklasse Zürich in (Switzerland) Zürich
  - The Czech Republic won the gold medal tally. The United States won the overall medal tally.
- September 1: Memorial Van Damme (final) in (Belgium) Brussels
  - The United States and Kenya won 4 gold medals each. The United States won the overall medal tally.

==== 2017 IAAF World Challenge & IAAF Hammer Throw Challenge ====
- May 20: Jamaica International Invitational in Kingston (World Challenge only)
  - World Challenge: Jamaica won the gold medal tally. The United States won the overall medal tally.
- May 21: Golden Grand Prix in Kawasaki, Kanagawa
  - World Challenge: The United States won the gold medal tally. The United States and Japan won 14 overall medals each.
  - Women's Hammer Throw winner: (United States) Gwen Berry
- June 3: Grande Premio Brasil de Atletismo in São Bernardo do Campo
  - World Challenge: Brazil won both the gold and overall medal tallies.
  - Women's Hammer Throw winner: (Poland) Anita Włodarczyk
- June 10: Janusz Kusociński Memorial in (Poland) Szczecin (Hammer Throw Challenge only)
  - Hammer Throw winners: (Poland) Paweł Fajdek (m) / (Poland) Anita Włodarczyk (f)
- June 11: Fanny Blankers-Koen Games in (Netherlands) Hengelo (World Challenge only)
  - World Challenge: Ethiopia won both the gold and overall medal tallies.
- June 13: Paavo Nurmi Games in Turku
  - World Challenge: Finland and Ukraine won 3 gold and 8 overall medals each.
  - Men's Hammer Throw winner: (Poland) Paweł Fajdek
- June 17: P-T-S Meeting in (Slovakia) Šamorín (Hammer Throw Challenge only)
  - Hammer Throw winners: (Poland) Paweł Fajdek (m) / (Poland) Anita Włodarczyk (f)
- June 27 & 28: Golden Spike Ostrava in (Czech Republic) Ostrava
  - World Challenge: Poland won both the gold and overall medal tallies.
  - Hammer Throw winners: (Poland) Paweł Fajdek (m) / (Poland) Anita Włodarczyk (f)
- July 3 & 4: István Gyulai Memorial in (Hungary) Székesfehérvár (Hammer Throw Challenge only)
  - Hammer Throw winners: (Poland) Paweł Fajdek (m) / (Poland) Anita Włodarczyk (f)
- July 14: Meeting de Atletismo Madrid in (Spain) Madrid
  - World Challenge: Cuba won the gold medal tally. The United States won the overall medal tally.
  - Men's Hammer Throw winner: (Poland) Paweł Fajdek
- August 4–13: Part of the 2017 World Championships in Athletics in (United Kingdom) London (Hammer Throw Challenge only)
  - Winners: (Poland) Paweł Fajdek (m) / (Poland) Anita Włodarczyk (f)
- August 27: ISTAF Berlin in Berlin (World Challenge only)
  - World Challenge: The United States and Germany won 4 gold medals each. The United States won the overall medal tally.
- August 29: Hanžeković Memorial (final) in (Croatia) Zagreb (World Challenge only)
  - World Challenge: The United States won both the gold and overall medal tallies.

==== 2017 IAAF World Indoor Tour ====
- January 28: New Balance Indoor Grand Prix in Roxbury
  - 60 m winners: (United Kingdom) Harry Aikines-Aryeetey (m) / (United States) English Gardner (f)
  - 300 m winners: (United States) Noah Lyles (m) / (United States) Courtney Okolo (f)
  - Men's 600m winner: (United States) Duane Solomon
  - Women's 800m winner: (United States) Charlene Lipsey
  - 3000 m winners: (United States) Paul Chelimo (m) / (Kenya) Hellen Obiri (f)
  - Men's High Jump winner: (The Bahamas) Donald Thomas
  - Men's Long Jump winner: (Australia) Fabrice Lapierre
  - Men's One Mile winner: (United States) Matthew Centrowitz Jr.
  - Women's Pole Vault winner: (Greece) Ekaterini Stefanidi
  - Women's Triple Jump winner: (Portugal) Patrícia Mamona
  - Women's Distance Medley Relay winners: The United States
- February 1: PSD Bank Meeting in (Germany) Düsseldorf
  - 60 m winners: (Cuba) Yunier Perez (m) / (Ukraine) Olesya Povh (f)
  - 60 m Hurdles winners: (Spain) Orlando Ortega (m) / (Germany) Cindy Roleder (f)
  - 800 m winners: (Poland) Adam Kszczot (m) / (Poland) Joanna Jóźwik (f)
  - Men's 1500 m winner: (Kenya) Elijah Manangoi
  - Men's 3000 m winner: (Kenya) Hillary Cheruiyot Ngetich
  - Women's Pole Vault winner: (United States) Sandi Morris
  - Women's Triple Jump winner: (Portugal) Patrícia Mamona
  - Women's Shot Put winner: (Hungary) Anita Márton
- February 4: Weltklasse in Karlsruhe in (Germany) Karlsruhe
  - 800 m winners: (United States) Erik Sowinski (m) / (Poland) Joanna Jóźwik (f)
  - 60 m Hurdles winners: (United Kingdom) Andrew Pozzi (m) / (United States) Kendra Harrison (f)
  - Men's 1500 m winner: (Kenya) Silas Kiplagat
  - Men's High Jump winner: (Belarus) Pavel Seliverstau
  - Men's Long Jump winner: (South Africa) Godfrey Khotso Mokoena
  - Women's 60 m winner: (Jamaica) Gayon Evans
  - Women's 3000 m winner: (United Kingdom) Laura Muir
  - Women's Pole Vault winner: (Germany) Lisa Ryzih
  - Women's Shot Put winner: (Germany) Christina Schwanitz
- February 10: Copernicus Cup in (Poland) Toruń
  - 60 m winners: (United States) Ronnie Baker (m) / (United States) Barbara Pierre (f)
  - 800 m winners: (Kenya) Nicholas Kiplangat Kipkoech (m) / (Poland) Joanna Józwik (f)
  - 1500 m winners: (Kenya) Bethwell Birgen (m) / (Ethiopia) Genzebe Dibaba (f)
  - 60 m Hurdles winners: (Spain) Orlando Ortega (m) / (Croatia) Andrea Ivančević (f)
  - Men's High Jump winner: (Poland) Sylwester Bednarek
  - Women's Pole Vault winner: (Switzerland) Nicole Büchler
  - Women's Triple Jump winner: (Poland) Anna Jagaciak-Michalska
- February 18: Birmingham Indoor Grand Prix (final) in (United Kingdom) Birmingham
  - 60 m winners: (United States) Ronnie Baker (m) / (Jamaica) Elaine Thompson (f)
  - 400 m winners: (Czech Republic) Pavel Maslák (m) / (Czech Republic) Zuzana Hejnová (f)
  - 800 m winners: (United States) Casimir Loxsom (m) / (Poland) Joanna Józwik (f)
  - 60 m Hurdles winners: (United Kingdom) Andrew Pozzi (m) / (United States) Christina Manning (f)
  - Long Jump winners: (South Africa) Godfrey Khotso Mokoena (m) / (United Kingdom) Lorraine Ugen (f)
  - Men's 1500 m winner: (United States) Ben Blankenship
  - Men's 5000 m winner: (United Kingdom) Mo Farah
  - Men's High Jump winner: (United States) Erik Kynard
  - Women's 1000 m winner: (United Kingdom) Laura Muir
  - Women's 3000 m winner: (Kenya) Hellen Obiri
  - Women's Pole Vault winner: (Greece) Ekaterini Stefanidi
  - Women's Shot Put winner: (Hungary) Anita Márton

==== 2017 IAAF Combined Events Challenge ====
- April 28 & 29: Multistars in (Italy) Florence
  - Decathlon winner: (Brazil) Jefferson Santos (7,728 points)
  - Heptathlon winner: (Colombia) Evelis Aguilar (6,228 points)
- May 27 & 28: Hypo-Meeting in (Austria) Götzis
  - Decathlon winner: (Canada) Damian Warner (8,591 points)
  - Heptathlon winner: (Belgium) Nafissatou Thiam (7,013 points)
- June 17 & 18: TNT – Fortuna Meeting in (Czech Republic) Kladno
  - Decathlon winner: (Algeria) Larbi Bourrada (8,120 points)
  - Heptathlon winner: (Czech Republic) Kateřina Cachová (6,337 points)
- June 24 & 25: Mehrkampf-Meeting Ratingen in (Germany) Ratingen
  - Decathlon winner: (Germany) Rico Freimuth (8,663 points)
  - Heptathlon winner: (Germany) Carolin Schäfer (6,667 points)
- July 1 & 2: European Cup Combined Events – Super League in (Estonia) Tallinn
  - Decathlon winner: (Estonia) Janek Õiglane (8,170 points)
  - Heptathlon winner: (Ukraine) Alina Shukh (6,208 points)
- July 1 & 2: European Cup Combined Events – First & Second League in (Spain) Monzón
  - First League Decathlon winner: (Spain) Jorge Ureña (8,121 points)
  - First League Heptathlon winner: (Netherlands) Nadine Broersen (6,326 points)
  - Second League Decathlon winner: (Norway) Martin Roe (8,144 points)
  - Second League Heptathlon winner: (Slovakia) Lucia Slaničková (5,816 points)
- July 4 & 5: Pan American Combined Events Cup in (Canada) Ottawa
  - Decathlon winner: (Canada) Pierce Lepage (7,948 points)
  - Heptathlon winner: (Canada) Nicole Oudenaarden (6,000 points)
- August 4–13: Part of the 2017 World Championships in Athletics in (United Kingdom) London
  - Decathlon winner: (France) Kévin Mayer (8,768 points)
  - Heptathlon winner: (Belgium) Nafissatou Thiam (6,784 points)
- September 16 & 17: Décastar (final) in (France) Talence
  - Decathlon winner: (Canada) Damian Warner (8,252 points)
  - Heptathlon winner: (Netherlands) Anouk Vetter (6,363 points)

==== 2017 IAAF Race Walking Challenge ====
- February 19: Oceania Race Walking Championships in (Australia) Adelaide
  - Winners: (Australia) Dane Bird-Smith (m) / (Australia) Regan Lamble (f)
- March 12: Circuito Internacional de Marcha #1 in (Mexico) Ciudad Juárez
  - Winners: (Colombia) Éider Arévalo (m) / (Mexico) Lupita González (f)
- March 19: Circuito Internacional de Marcha #2 in (Mexico) Monterrey
  - 20 km winners: (Canada) Benjamin Thorne (m) / (Brazil) Érica de Sena (f)
  - Men's 50 km winner: (Canada) Evan Dunfee
- March 19: Asian Race Walking Championships in (Japan) Nomi, Ishikawa
  - Winners: (South Korea) Kim Hyun-sub (m) / (China) Wang Na (f)
- April 1: Grande Prémio Internacional de Rio Maior em Marcha Atlética in (Portugal) Rio Maior
  - Winners: (Colombia) Éider Arévalo (m) / (Peru) Kimberly García (f)
- April 15: IAAF Race Walking Challenge Taicang in (China) Taicang
  - Winners: (Brazil) Caio Bonfim (m) / (China) Lü Xiuzhi (f)
- May 13 & 14: Pan American Race Walking Cup in (Peru) Lima
  - 20 km winners: (Colombia) Éider Arévalo (m) / (Mexico) Lupita González (f)
  - 50 km winners: (Ecuador) Claudio Villanueva (m) / (Brazil) Nair de Rosa (f)
- May 21: European Race Walking Cup in (Czech Republic) Poděbrady
  - 20 km winners: (Germany) Christopher Linke (m) / (Italy) Antonella Palmisano (f)
  - Men's 50 km winner: (Ukraine) Ivan Banzeruk
- June 3: Gran Premio Cantones de La Coruña in (Spain) A Coruña
  - Winners: (Spain) Álvaro Martín (m) / (Brazil) Érica de Sena (f)
- August 4–13: Part of the 2017 World Championships in Athletics (final) in (United Kingdom) London
  - 20 km winners: (Colombia) Éider Arévalo (m) / (China) YANG Jiayu (f)
  - 50 km winners: (France) Yohann Diniz (m) / (Portugal) Inês Henriques (f) (World Record)

==== 2017 IAAF Cross Country Permit ====
- November 13, 2016: Cross de Atapuerca in (Spain) Burgos
  - Winners: (Bahrain) Aweke Ayalew (m) / (Ethiopia) Senbere Teferi (f)
- November 27, 2016: Cross Internacional de la Constitución in (Spain) Alcobendas
  - Winners: (Uganda) Timothy Toroitich (m) / (Republic of Ireland) Fionnuala McCormack (f)
- January 6: Campaccio in (Italy) San Giorgio su Legnano
  - Winners: (Ethiopia) Muktar Edris (m) / (Kenya) Hellen Obiri (f)
- January 14: Antrim International Cross Country in (United Kingdom) Antrim
  - Winners: (Kenya) Conseslus Kipruto (m) / (Kenya) Caroline Chepkoech Kipkirui (f)
- January 15: Cross Internacional de Itálica in (Spain) Seville
  - Winners: (Bahrain) Aweke Ayalew (m) / (Ethiopia) Senbere Teferi (f)
- January 22: Cinque Mulini in (Italy) San Vittore Olona
  - Winners: (Ethiopia) Selemon Barega (m) / (Ethiopia) Beyenu Degefa (f)
- February 5: Almond Blossom Cross Country in (Portugal) Albufeira (final)
  - Winners: (Italy) Yemanebehran Crippa (m) / (Kenya) Irene Chepet Cheptai (f)

== European Athletic Association (EA) ==
=== EA Cross Country Permit ===
- September 24, 2016: Lidingöloppet in (Sweden) Lidingö
  - Winners: (Kenya) Japhet Kipchirchir Kipkorir (m) / (Sweden) Maria Larsson (f)
- October 29, 2016: Nordic Winter Cross in (Denmark) Middelfart
  - Winners: (Sweden) David Nilsson (m) / (Denmark) Anna Emilie Møller (f)
- November 20, 2016: Cross de Soria in (Spain) Soria
  - Winners: (Uganda) Timothy Toroitich (m) / (Kenya) Alice Aprot Nawowuna (f)
- November 20, 2016: Darmstadt Cross in (Germany) Darmstadt
  - Winners: (Kenya) Daniel Komoi (m) / (Germany) Caterina Granz (f)
- November 28, 2016: International Warandecross in (Netherlands) Tilburg
  - Winners: (Norway) Sondre Nordstad Moen (m) / (Switzerland) Fabienne Schlumpf (f)
- November 28, 2016: Cross de L'Acier in (France) Leffrinckoucke
  - Winners: (Ethiopia) Shirtagaseleon Barega (m) / (Ethiopia) Beyenu Degefu (f)
- December 18, 2016: Lotto Cross Cup Brussels in (Belgium) Brussels
  - Winners: (Belgium) Isaac Kimeli (m) / (Republic of Ireland) Fionnuala McCormack (f)
- January 7: Great Edinburgh Cross Country in (United Kingdom) Edinburgh
  - Winners: (United States) Leonard Essau Korir (m) / (Turkey) Yasemin Can (f)
- January 8: Cross Zornotza in Spain
  - Winners: (Eritrea) Nguse Amlosom (m) / (United Kingdom) Jess Andrews (f)
- January 15: Abdijcross in (Netherlands) Kerkrade
  - Winners: (Sweden) David Nilsson (m) / (Belgium) Imana Truyers (f)
- January 15: Cross della Vallagarina in (Italy) Rovereto
  - Winners: (Kenya) Robert Ndiwa (m) / (Ethiopia) Alemitu Hawi (f)
- January 22: Cross Internacional Juan Muguerza in (Spain) Elgoibar
  - Winners: (Uganda) Joshua Kiprui Cheptegei (m) / (Ethiopia) Senbere Teferi (f)
- January 22: Lotto Cross Cup de Hannut (final) in (Belgium) Hannut
  - Winners: (United Kingdom) Andy Vernon (m) / (Ethiopia) Birtukan Adamu (f)

=== EA Premium Permit Meetings ===
- August 29: Palio Città della Quercia (final) in (Italy) Rovereto

=== EA Classic Permit Meetings ===
- June 1: Meeting International de Montreuil in France
  - 100 m winners: (France) Christophe Lemaitre (m) / (France) Carole Zahi (f)
  - 800 m winners: (Morocco) Mostafa Smaili (m) / (United Kingdom) Shelayna Oskan-Clarke (f)
  - Men's 1500 m winner: (Uganda) Ronald Musagala
  - Men's 5000 m winner: (Ethiopia) Shirtagaseleon Barega
  - Men's 110 m Hurdles winner: (Jamaica) Hansle Parchment
  - Women's 100 m Hurdles winner: (Norway) Isabelle Pedersen
  - Women's Pole Vault winner: (Russia) Olga Mullina
  - Women's Long Jump winner: (Germany) Melanie Bauschke
  - Women's Discus Throw winner: (Ukraine) Natalia Semenova
- June 2: European Athletics Festival Bydgoszcz in Poland
  - 100 m: (United States) Sean McLean (m) / (United States) Barbara Pierre (f)
  - 400 m winners: (Poland) Rafał Omelko (m) / (Poland) Justyna Święty (f)
  - Women's 600 m winner: (Poland) Joanna Jóźwik
  - Men's 800 m winner: (Poland) Michał Rozmys
  - Men's 110 m Hurdles winner: (Poland) Damian Czykier
  - Women's 100 m Hurdles winner: (Ukraine) Hanna Plotitsyna
  - Men's 400 m Hurdles winner: (Algeria) Abdelmalik Lahoulou
  - Women's 1500 m winner: (Poland) Martyna Galant
  - Men's 3000 m steeplechase winner: (Kenya) Clement Kimutai Kemboi
  - Men's Pole Vault winner: (Poland) Paweł Wojciechowski
  - Women's High Jump winner: (Ukraine) Yuliya Chumachenko
  - Men's Shot Put winner: (Poland) Konrad Bukowiecki
  - 4 × 100 m winners: Poland B (Karol Kwiatkowski, Przemysław Adamski, Artur Zaczek, Grzegorz Zimniewicz) (m) / Poland (Marika Popowicz-Drapała, Karolina Zagajewska, Anna Kiełbasińska, Ewa Swoboda) (f)
- June 2: Meeting of Andújar in Spain
  - Men's 100 m winner: (Turkey) Ramil Guliyev
  - 200 m winners: (Turkey) Ramil Guliyev (m) / (Spain) Cristina Lara (f)
  - 800 m winners: (Kenya) Job Koech Kinyor (m) / (Uganda) Dorcus Ajok (f)
  - Women's 1500 m winner: (Serbia) Amela Terzić
  - Men's 2000 m steeplechase winner: (Kenya) Benjamin Kigen
  - Women's 5000 m winner: (Ethiopia) Azmera Gebru
  - Men's High Jump winner: (Belarus) Maksim Nedasekau
  - Women's Javelin Throw winner: (Israel) Marharyta Dorozhon
  - Triple Jump winners: (Spain) Pablo Torrijos (m) / (Venezuela) Yulimar Rojas (f)
  - Men's Shot Put winner: (Australia) Damien Birkinhead
  - Men's Discus Throw winner: (Colombia) Mauricio Ortega
- June 3: Meeting de Marseille in France
  - 100 m winners: (France) Jimmy Vicaut (m) / (Nigeria) Blessing Okagbare (f)
  - 400 m winners: (South Africa) Pieter Conradie (m) / (Ukraine) Olha Zemlyak (f)
  - 1500 m winners: (Morocco) Abdalaati Iguider (m) / (Kenya) Nelly Jepkosgei (f)
  - Men's 3000 m steeplechase winner: (Kenya) Jairus Birech
  - 110 m Hurdles winners: (Jamaica) Hansle Parchment (m) / (Germany) Pamela Dutkiewicz (f)
  - Women's 400 m Hurdles winner: (Poland) Joanna Linkiewicz
  - Men's Long Jump winner: (South Africa) Godfrey Khotso Mokoena
  - Women's Triple Jump winner: (Germany) Kristin Gierisch
  - Women's Discus Throw winner: (France) Mélina Robert-Michon
- June 5: Josef Odložil Memorial in (Czech Republic) Prague
  - Men's 100 m winner: (Lesotho) Mosito Lehata
  - Men's 400 m winner: (Slovenia) Luka Janežič
  - Women's 800 m winner: (Ukraine) Olha Lyakhova
  - Men's 1500 m winner: (Bahrain) Sadik Mikhou
  - Women's 3000 m steeplechase winner: (Kenya) Norah Jeruto
  - Men's 110 m Hurdles winner: (South Africa) Antonio Alkana
  - 400 m Hurdles winners: (France) Mamadou Kassé Hanne (m) / (South Africa) Wenda Nel (f)
  - Women's Long Jump winner: (Slovenia) Neja Filipič
  - Men's Pole Vault winner: (Czech Republic) Jan Kudlička
  - Women's Hammer Throw winner: (Poland) Malwina Kopron
  - Javelin Throw winners: (Czech Republic) Jakub Vadlejch (m) / (Czech Republic) Barbora Špotáková (f)
  - Men's Shot Put winner: (Czech Republic) Tomáš Staněk
- June 14: Janusz Kusociński Memorial in (Poland) Szczecin
  - Men's 100 m winner: (Poland) Dominik Kopeć
  - 400 m winners: (Poland) Rafał Omelko (m) / (Ukraine) Olha Zemlyak (f)
  - 800 m winners: (Poland) Marcin Lewandowski (m) / (Ukraine) Nataliya Pryshchepa (f)
  - Women's 1500 m winner: (Poland) Sofia Ennaoui
  - Men's 3000 m winner: (Poland) Bartosz Kotłowski
  - Men's 110 m Hurdles winner: (Poland) Damian Czykier
  - Women's 400 m Hurdles winner: (Bahrain) Kemi Adekoya
  - Men's High Jump winner: (Poland) Wojciech Theiner
  - Pole Vault winners: (Poland) Piotr Lisek (m) / (Poland) Agnieszka Kaszuba (f)
  - Women's Long Jump winner: (Italy) Laura Strati
  - Men's Shot Put winner: (Germany) David Storl
  - Men's Discus Throw winner: (Lithuania) Andrius Gudžius
  - Hammer Throw winners: (Poland) Paweł Fajdek (m) / (Poland) Anita Włodarczyk (f)
  - Men's Javelin Throw winner: (Poland) Hubert Chmielak
- June 14: Meeting Iberoamericano de Atletismo in (Spain) Huelva
  - 400 m winners: (Botswana) Onkabetse Nkobolo (m) / (Poland) Patrycja Wyciszkiewicz (f)
  - 800 m winners: (Burundi) Antoine Gakeme (m) / (Uganda) Dorcus Ajok (f)
  - 1500 m winners: (Spain) Adel Mechaal (m) / (Serbia) Amela Terzić (f)
  - Men's 5000 m winner: (Bahrain) Birhanu Yemataw Balew
  - 3000 m steeplechase winners: (Eritrea) Yemane Haileselassie (m) / (Morocco) Fadwa Sidi Madane (f)
  - Men's 110 m Hurdles winner: (Spain) Orlando Ortega
  - Men's 400 m Hurdles winner: (Cape Verde) Jordin Andrade
  - Women's High Jump winner: (Ukraine) Iryna Herashchenko
  - Women's Triple Jump winner: (Romania) Elena Panțuroiu
  - Men's Hammer Throw winner: (United Kingdom) Nick Miller
  - Women's Shot Put winner: (Sweden) Fanny Roos
  - Women's 3000 m walk winner: (Spain) Laura García-Caro
- June 20: Copenhagen Athletics Games in Denmark
  - 100 m winners: (Zambia) Sydney Siame (m) / (Denmark) Mathilde Kramer (f)
  - Men's 400 m winner: (Sudan) Sadam Koumi
  - Men's 800 m winner: (South Africa) Reinhardt van Rensburg
  - Women's 1500 m winner: (Denmark) Anna Emilie Møller
  - Men's 3000 metres steeplechase winner: (Denmark) Ole Hesselbjerg
  - 110 m Hurdles winners: (Denmark) Andreas Martinsen (m) / (Nigeria) Lindsay Lindley (f)
  - 400 m Hurdles winners: (Estonia) Jaak-Heinrich Jagor (m) / (Poland) Emilia Ankiewicz (f)
  - Women's Long Jump winner: (Bulgaria) Milena Mitkova
  - Men's Pole Vault winner: (United Kingdom) Harry Coppell
  - Men's Long Jump winner: (Norway) Ingar Kiplesund
  - Women's Shot Put winner: (Poland) Paulina Guba
- June 21: European Athletics Classic Meeting in (Slovenia) Velenje
  - Men's 100 m winner: (South Africa) Wayde van Niekerk
  - Women's 200 m winner: (South Africa) Tamzin Thomas
  - 400 m winners: (Botswana) Isaac Makwala (m) / (Slovenia) Anita Horvat (f)
  - Men's 800 m winner: (Bosnia and Herzegovina) Amel Tuka
  - Women's 1500 m winner: (Australia) Brittany McGowan
  - 110 m Hurdles winners: (Slovenia) Filip Jakob Demšar (m) / (South Africa) Rikenette Steenkamp (f)
  - Women's High Jump winner: (Slovenia) Maruša Černjul
  - Pole Vault winners: (Philippines) Ernest Obiena (m) / (Slovenia) Tina Šutej (f)
  - Long Jump winners: (Cuba) Maykel Massó (m) / (Sweden) Kaiza Karlén (f)
  - Triple Jump winners: (Slovenia) Dino Subašič (m) / (Slovenia) Petra Koren (f)
  - Men's Shot Put winner: (Croatia) Filip Mihaljević
  - Discus Throw winners: (Croatia) Filip Mihaljević (m) / (Croatia) Sandra Perković (f)
  - Javelin Throw: (Australia) Hamish Peacock (m) / (Turkey) Eda Tuğsuz (f)
- June 28: Meeting Stanislas in (France) Nancy
  - 100 m winners:: (South Africa) Henricho Bruintjies (m) / (France) Floriane Gnafoua (f)
  - Women's 400 m winner: (Botswana) Lydia Jele
  - 800 m winners: (Kenya) Willy Tarbei (m) / (Morocco) Malika Akkaoui (f)
  - 1500 m: (Morocco) Abdalaati Iguider
  - Men's 110 m Hurdles winner: (France) Benjamin Sedecias
  - Women's 100 m Hurdles winner: (Belarus) Elvira Herman
  - Women's Hammer Throw winner: (Moldova) Zalina Petrivskaya
  - Men's Pole Vault winner: (France) Kévin Menaldo
  - Women's Javelin Throw winner: (Latvia) Anete Kociņa
  - Men's Triple Jump winner: (Burkina Faso) Hugues Fabrice Zango
- June 29: Sollentuna GP in Sweden
  - Men's 100 m winner: (Sweden) Odain Rose
  - 200 m winners: (Sudan) Ahmed Ali (m) / (Belarus) Krystsina Tsimanouskaya (f)
  - 800 m winners: (Sweden) Andreas Kramer (m) / (Germany) Christina Hering (f)
  - 1500 m winners: (Morocco) Brahim Kaazouzi (m) / (Serbia) Amela Terzić (f)
  - 5000 m winners: (Ethiopia) Fikadu Haftu (m) / (Republic of Ireland) Emma Mitchell (f)
  - 3000 m steeplechase winners: (Sweden) Napoleon Solomon (m) / (Sweden) Maria Larsson (f)
  - Women's 100 m Hurdles winner: (Poland) Urszula Bhebhe
  - Men's 400 m Hurdles winner: (South Africa) Cornel Fredericks
  - High Jump winners: (Sweden) Fabian Delryd (m) / (Sweden) Bianca Salming (f)
  - Men's Long Jump winner: (Sweden) Michel Tornéus
  - Women's Triple Jump winner: (Sweden) Malin Marmbrandt
  - Women's Shot Put winner: (Sweden) Fanny Roos
  - Men's Discus Throw winner: (Sweden) Daniel Ståhl
  - Women's Hammer Throw winner: (Sweden) Eleni Larsson
  - Women's U18 3 kg Hammer Throw winner: (Sweden) Karin Schöldström
- July 4: Gyulai Istvàn Memorial – Hungarian Athletics Grand Prix in (Hungary) Székesfehérvár
  - 100 m winners: (United States) Justin Gatlin (m) / (Nigeria) Blessing Okagbare (f)
  - Men's 200 m winner: (United States) Isiah Young
  - 400 m winners: (The Bahamas) Steven Gardiner (m) / (The Bahamas) Shaunae Miller-Uibo (f)
  - Men's 800 m winner: (Kenya) David Rudisha
  - Women's 3000 steeplechase winner: (Ethiopia) Etenesh Diro
  - Men's 110 m Hurdles winner: (Jamaica) Omar McLeod
  - Women's 100 m Hurdles winner: (United States) Kendra Harrison
  - 400 m Hurdles winners: (United States) Bershawn Jackson (m) / (United States) Kori Carter (f)
  - Men's High Jump winner: (Ukraine) Bohdan Bondarenko
  - Long Jump winners: (South Africa) Rushwahl Samaai (m) / (United States) Tianna Bartoletta (f)
  - Men's Discus Throw winner: (Hungary) Zoltán Kővágó
  - Women's Shot Put winner: (Hungary) Anita Márton
  - Hammer Throw winners: (Poland) Paweł Fajdek (m) / (Poland) Anita Włodarczyk (f)
  - Men's Javelin Throw winner: (Poland) Marcin Krukowski
- July 7: Meeting International de Sotteville in France
  - 100 m winners: (Cuba) Yunier Perez (m) / (South Africa) Carina Horn (f)
  - Women's 400 m winner: (Brazil) Geisa Coutinho
  - Women's 800 m winner: (Cuba) Rose Mary Almanza
  - Men's 1500 m winner: (Morocco) Fouad Elkaam
  - Men's 3000 m steeplechase winner: (France) Mahiedine Mekhissi-Benabbad
  - Men's 110 M Hurdles winner: (Jamaica) Andrew Riley
  - Men's 400 m Hurdles winner: (Dominican Republic) Juander Santos
  - Men's Long Jump winner: (South Africa) Zarck Visser
  - Women's High Jump winner: (Sweden) Erika Kinsey
  - Women's Pole Vault winner: (United States) Sandi Morris
  - Women's Discus Throw winner: (Cuba) Yaimé Pérez
- June 11: Spitzen Leichtathletik Luzern in Switzerland
  - 100 m winners: (Jamaica) Nickel Ashmeade (m) / (Trinidad and Tobago) Kelly-Ann Baptiste (f)
  - 200 m winners: (Jamaica) Nickel Ashmeade (m) / (Switzerland) Léa Sprunger (f)
  - 400 m winners: (Switzerland) Joel Burgunder (m) / (Australia) Morgan Mitchell (f)
  - 800 m winners: (Bosnia and Herzegovina) Amel Tuka (m) / (Germany) Christina Hering (f)
  - Women's 3000 m steeplechase winner: (Ethiopia) Azmera Gebru
  - Women's 100 m Hurdles winner: (United States) Sharika Nelvis
  - Men's 110 m Hurdles winner: (United States) Devon Allen
  - 400 m Hurdles winners: (United States) Quincy Downing (m) / (Switzerland) Petra Fontanive (f)
  - Hammer Throw winners: (Germany) Tristan Schandke (m) / (Switzerland) Nicole Zihlmann (f)
  - Long Jump winners: (Brazil) Paulo Sérgio Oliveira (m) / (Canada) Christabel Nettey (f)
  - High Jump winners: (Switzerland) Lino Wunderlin (f) / (Nigeria) Doreen Amata (f)
  - Javelin Throw winners: (Germany) Johannes Vetter (m) / (Germany) Christin Hussong (f)
  - Women's Pole Vault winner: (Russia) Olga Mullina
- July 11: Gothenburg Athletics Grand Prix in Sweden
  - 200 m winners: (United Kingdom) Richard Kilty (m) / (Brazil) Vitória Cristina Rosa (f)
  - Men's 400 m winner: (United Kingdom) Rabah Yousif
  - 1000 m winners:: (Sweden) Alexander Nilsson (m) / (Sweden) Lovisa Lindh (f)
  - 3000 m steeplechase: (Kenya) Cornelius Kipruto Kangogo (m) / (Kenya) Caroline Chepkurui Tuigong (f)
  - Women's 100 m Hurdles winner: (South Africa) Rikenette Steenkamp
  - Men's Triple Jump winner: (Cuba) Cristian Nápoles
  - Women's Pole Vault winner: (United States) Katie Nageotte
  - Men's Shot Put winner: (Nigeria) Chukwuebuka Enekwechi
  - Women's Long Jump winner: (Sweden) Khaddi Sagnia
  - Discus Throw winners: (Germany) Martin Wierig (m) / (United States) Gia Lewis-Smallwood (f)
  - Women's Javelin Throw winner: (Sweden) Elisabeth Lithell
- July 16: Meeting Città di Padova in Italy
  - Men's 100 m winner: (United States) Isiah Young
  - Women's 200 m winner: (United States) Allyson Felix
  - Women's 400 m winner: (United States) Allyson Felix
  - 800 m winners: (Bosnia and Herzegovina) Amel Tuka (m) / (United States) Ajee' Wilson (f)
  - 1500 m winners: (Kenya) Jonathan Kiplimo Sawe (m) / (United Kingdom) Laura Muir (f)
  - Men's 110 m Hurdles winner: (Jamaica) Ronald Levy
  - Women's 100 m Hurdles winner: (United States) Queen Harrison
  - Men's 400 m Hurdles winner: (Kenya) Haron Koech
  - Men's Long Jump winner: (Cuba) Juan Miguel Echevarría
  - Women's High Jump winner: Mariya Lasitskene
  - Women's Pole Vault winner: (Greece) Katerina Stefanidi
  - Women's Triple Jump winner: (Lithuania) Dovilė Dzindzaletaitė
  - Women's Shot Put winner: (Hungary) Anita Márton
- July 22: KBC Night of Athletics in Heusden-Zolder
  - Men's 200 m winner: (Antigua and Barbuda) Cejhae Greene
  - Men's 400 m winner: (Trinidad and Tobago) Machel Cedenio
  - 800 m winners: (Kenya) Willy Tarbei (m) / (Belgium) Renée Eykens (f)
  - 1500 m winners: (Peru) David Torrence (m) / (United States) Colleen Quigley (f)
  - 5000 m winners: (Bahrain) Birhanu Yemataw Balew (m) / (Netherlands) Susan Krumins (f)
  - Men's 110 m Hurdles winner: (Jamaica) Deuce Carter
  - Women's 100 m Hurdles winner: (Ukraine) Hanna Plotitsyna
  - 400 m Hurdles winners: (Cuba) Omar Cisneros (m) / (Canada) Sage Watson (f)
  - Women's High Jump winner: (Ukraine) Yuliya Levchenko
  - Men's Long Jump winner: (Brazil) Tiago da Silva
  - Women's Pole Vault winner: (New Zealand) Eliza McCartney
  - 4 × 400 m winners: Belgium (m) / Jamaica (f)
- July 26: Karlstad GP in Sweden
  - 100 m winners: (Sudan) Ahmed Ali (m) / (Latvia) Gunta Latiševa-Čudare (f)
  - 200 m winners: (Sudan) Ahmed Ali (m) / (Latvia) Gunta Latiševa-Čudare (f)
  - 800 m winners: (Kenya) Willy Tarbei (m) / (United States) Alexa Efraimson (f)
  - Men's 3000 m winner: (Hungary) Benjamin Kovács
  - Women's 3000 m steeplechase winner: (United States) Mel Lawrence
  - Women's 100 m Hurdles winner: (United Kingdom) Jessica Hunter
  - Men's 400 m Hurdles winner: (Qatar) Abderrahmane Samba
  - High Jump winners: (Sweden) Fabian Delryd (m) / (Sweden) Erika Kinsey (f)
  - Women's Pole Vault winner: (Sweden) Angelica Bengtsson
  - Long jump winners: (Sweden) Michel Tornéus (m) / (Sweden) Khaddi Sagnia (f)
  - Men's Discus Throw winner: (Sweden) Daniel Ståhl
  - Hammer Throw winners: (Sweden) Oscar Vestlund (m) / (Sweden) Marinda Petersson (f)
  - Men's Javelin Throw winner: (Germany) Lars Hamann
- August 18: Malmö Games (final) in Sweden

=== EA Outdoor Special Premium Meetings ===
- June 1: Athens Street Pole Vault in Greece
  - Winner: (Greece) Konstantinos Filippidis (men's only)
- August 15: Kamila Skolimowska Memorial Meeting (final) in (Poland) Warsaw
  - 100 m winners: (Cuba) Yunier Perez (m) / (Brazil) Rosângela Santos
  - Men's 110 m Hurdles winner: (United States) Devon Allen
  - Women's 100 m Hurdles winner: (United States) Sharika Nelvis
  - High Jump winners: (Poland) Sylwester Bednarek (m) / (Russia) Mariya Lasitskene (f)
  - Men's Pole Vault winner: (France) Renaud Lavillenie
  - Shot Put winners: (Czech Republic) Tomáš Staněk (m) / (Brazil) Aliona Dubitskaya (f)
  - Men's Discus Throw winner: (Germany) Robert Harting
  - Hammer Throw winners: (Poland) Paweł Fajdek (m) / (Poland) Anita Włodarczyk (f)

=== EA Indoor Permit Meeting ===
- February 3 & 4: Combined Events Meeting in (Estonia) Lasnamäe
  - Men's Heptathlon winner: (Estonia) Kristjan Rosenberg
  - Women's Pentathlon winner: (Estonia) Margot Meri
- February 4: Reykjavik International Games 2017 in Reykjavík
  - Iceland won both the gold and overall medal tallies.
- February 5: All Star Perche in (France) Clermont-Ferrand
  - Winners: (Canada) Shawnacy Barber (m) / (United States) Sandi Morris (f)
- February 10: Gugl Games in (Austria) Linz
  - 60 m winners: (Philippines) Eric Cray (m) / (Germany) Amelie-Sophie Lederer (f)
  - Women's 200 m winner: (Slovenia) Agata Zupin
  - Men's 400 m winner: (Slovenia) Luka Janežič
  - Women's 800 m winner: (Italy) Irene Baldessari
  - Men's 1000 m winner: (Czech Republic) Daniel Kotyza
  - Men's 1500 m winner: (Hungary) Benjamin Kovács
  - 60 m Hurdles winners: (United States) Dondre Echols (m) / (Croatia) Ivana Lončarek (f)
  - Women's Pole Vault winner: (Slovenia) Tina Šutej
  - Men's High Jump winner: (Croatia) Alen Melon
  - Women's Long Jump winner: (France) Heather Arneton
  - Men's Triple Jump winner: (Slovakia) Tomáš Veszelka
- February 11: IFAM Meeting in Ghent
  - 60 m winners: (Jamaica) Ryan Shields (m) / (France) Charlotte Jeanne (f)
  - 400 m winners: (Belgium) Alexander Doom (m) / (France) Agnès Raharolahy (f)
  - 800 m winners: (France) Samir Youb (m) / (Italy) Joyce Mattagliano (f)
  - 1500 m winners: (Sweden) Kalle Berglund (m) / (Belarus) Darya Barysevich (f)
  - Men's 3000 m winner: (Sweden) Jonas Leandersson
  - 60 m Hurdles winners: (Belarus) Vitali Parokhonka (m) / (Belgium) Sarah Missinne (f)
  - High Jump winners: (Italy) Lamont Marcell Jacobs (m) / (Belgium) Hannelore Desmet (f)
  - Pole Vault winners: (China) Huang Bokai (m) / (Switzerland) Angelica Moser (f)
  - Long Jump winners: (Mali) Abdoulaye Diarra (m) / (Belgium) Cassandre Evans (f)
  - 4 × 200 m winners: Belgium (m) / Netherlands (f)
- February 14: Czech Indoor Gala in (Czech Republic) Ostrava
  - 60 m winners: (Bahrain) Andrew Fisher (m) / (Jamaica) Gayon Evans (f)
  - Men's 300 m winner: (Grenada) Bralon Taplin
  - Women's 400 m winner: (Czech Republic) Zuzana Hejnová
  - 1500 m winners: (Hungary) Tamás Kazi (m) / (Ethiopia) Axumawit Embaye (f)
  - Women's 60 m Hurdles winner: (Ukraine) Hanna Plotitsyna
  - Men's Pole Vault winner: (Greece) Emmanouíl Karális
  - Women's High Jump winner: (Czech Republic) Michaela Hrubá
  - Men's Shot Put winner: (Poland) Konrad Bukowiecki
- February 16: Orlen Cup 2017 in (Poland) Łódź
  - 60 m winners: (Cuba) Yunier Perez (m) / (Poland) Ewa Swoboda (f)
  - 60 m Hurdles winners: (Hungary) Balázs Baji (m) / (Canada) Phylicia George (f)
  - Men's Pole Vault winner: (Poland) Piotr Lisek
  - Men's Shot Put winner: (Poland) Konrad Bukowiecki
  - Women's High Jump winner: (Poland) Kamila Lićwinko
- February 17: Istanbul Athletics Cup in (Turkey) Istanbul
  - 60 m winners: (Iran) Reza Ghasemi (m) / (Ukraine) Hrystyna Stuy (f)
  - 400 m winners: (Turkey) Batuhan Altıntaş (m) / (Ukraine) Olha Zemlyak (f)
  - Men's 800 m winner: (Bosnia and Herzegovina) Abedin Mujezinovic
  - Women's 1500 m winner: (Albania) Luiza Gega
  - Men's 3000 m winner: (Ethiopia) Mekonnen Gebremedhin
  - Men's High Jump winner: (Czech Republic) Martin Heindl
  - Women's Pole Vault winner: (Turkey) Buse Arikazan
  - Men's Long Jump winner: (Bulgaria) Daniel Dobrev
  - Men's Shot Put winner: (Bosnia and Herzegovina) Mesud Pezer
- February 24: Meeting de Atletismo Madrid (final) in (Spain) Madrid
  - 60 m winners: (Cuba) Yunier Perez (m) / (Venezuela) Andrea Purica (f)
  - 400 m winners: (Grenada) Bralon Taplin (m) / (Italy) Ayomide Folorunso (f)
  - Men's 800 m: (Poland) Adam Kszczot
  - Women's 1000 m winner: (Ethiopia) Genzebe Dibaba
  - 1500 m winners: (Algeria) Abderrahmane Anou (m) / (Morocco) Rababe Arafi (f)
  - 60 m Hurdles winners: (Spain) Orlando Ortega (m) / (Ukraine) Hanna Plotitsyna (f)
  - Men's Triple Jump winner: (Cuba) Alexis Copello
  - Women's High Jump winner: (Spain) Ruth Beitia
  - Women's Pole Vault winner: (Ukraine) Maryna Kylypko
  - Long Jump winners: (Spain) Eusebio Cáceres (m) / (Spain) Juliet Itoya (f)
  - Men's Shot Put winner: (Republic of the Congo) Franck Elemba

=== EA Indoor Area Permit Meetings ===
- February 4: Meeting Elite en Salle de Mondeville in (France) Mondeville
  - 60 m winners: (Saint Kitts and Nevis) Kim Collins (m) / (Ukraine) Olesya Povh (f)
  - Women's 400 m winner: (Ukraine) Olha Zemlyak
  - Men's 1500 m winner: (Algeria) Abderrahmane Anou
  - 3000 m winners: (Morocco) Brahim Kaazouzi / (Ethiopia) Taye Fantu (f)
  - 60 m Hurdles winners: (United Kingdom) David King / (Ukraine) Hanna Plotitsyna (f)
  - Men's Long Jump winner: (Ukraine) Vladyslav Mazur
  - Women's Triple Jump winner: (Belarus) Iryna Vaskouskaya
- February 10: Vectis Meeting in Luxembourg–Kirchberg
  - 60 m winners: (Germany) Robert Polkowski (m) / (France) Ombretta Minkue-Meye (f)
  - 400 m winners: (United Kingdom) Luke Lennon-Ford (m) / (Germany) Lara Hoffmann (f)
  - 800 m winners: (Tunisia) Abdessalem Ayouni (m) / (Czech Republic) Kateřina Hálová (f)
  - 1500 m winners: (Kenya) Hillary Ngetich / (Romania) Claudia Bobocea (f)
  - Women's 60 m Hurdles winner: (United States) Sydney Griffin
  - High Jump winners: (Slovakia) Tomáš Zeman (m) / (Luxembourg) Cathy Zimmer (f)
  - Men's Long Jump winner: (Belgium) Corentin Campener
  - Women's Pole Vault winner: (Belgium) Fanny Smets
- February 10: Meeting féminin du Val d'Oise in (France) Eaubonne
  - Women's 60 m winner: (Ghana) Flings Owusu-Agyapong
  - Women's 400 m winner: (Ukraine) Olha Zemlyak
  - Women's 800 m winner: (Ukraine) Olha Lyakhova
  - Women's 3000 m winner: (Ethiopia) Taye Fantu
  - Women's 60 m Hurdles winner: (Ukraine) Hanna Plotitsyna
  - Women's High Jump winner: (Ukraine) Yuliya Chumachenko
  - Women's Pole Vault winner: (Belarus) Iryna Yakaltsevich
  - Women's Triple Jump winner: (France) Jeanine Assani Issouf
- February 11: Nordic Indoor Match in (Finland) Tampere
  - 60 m winners: (Finland) Eetu Rantala (m) / (Norway) Helene Rønningen (f)
  - 200 m winners: (Finland) Samuli Samuelsson (m) / (Norway) Helene Rønningen (f)
  - 400 m winners: (Denmark) Benjamin Lobo Vedel (m) / (Iceland) Arna Stefanía Guðmundsdóttir (f)
  - Women's 800 m winner: (Denmark) Stina Troest
  - 1500 m winners: (Sweden) William Levay (m) / (Sweden) Charlotta Fougberg (f)
  - 3000 m winners: (Finland) Samu Mikkonen (m) / (Norway) Lena Selen (f)
  - 60 m Hurdles winners: (Denmark) Andreas Martinsen (m) / (Sweden) Susanna Kallur (f)
  - High Jump winners: (Sweden) Fabian Delryd (m) / (Sweden) Sofie Skoog (f)
  - Pole Vault winners: (Norway) Eirik Greibrokk Dolve (m) / (Finland) Minna Nikkanen (f)
  - Long Jump winners: (Finland) Roni Ollikainen (m) / (Sweden) Kaiza Karlén (f)
  - Triple Jump winners: (Finland) Simo Lipsanen (m) / (Finland) Kristiina Mäkelä (f)
  - Shot Put winners: (Finland) Arttu Kangas (m) / (Sweden) Fanny Roos (f)
  - 4 x 300 m winners: Norway (m) / Norway (f)
- February 12: Meeting Elite en Salle de Metz in (France) Metz
  - 60 m winners: (Cuba) Yunier Perez (m) / (Ivory Coast) Marie-Josée Ta Lou (f)
  - Women's 400 m winner: (France) Floria Gueï
  - 800 m winners: (France) Paul Renaudie (m) / (Morocco) Malika Akkaoui (f)
  - 1500 m winners: (France) Alexandre Saddedine (m) / (France) Emilie Jacquot-Claude (f)
  - Men's 3000 m winner: (France) Morhad Amdouni
  - 60 m Hurdles winners: (United States) Dondre Echols (m) / (Belgium) Anne Zagré
  - Men's Triple Jump winner: (Cuba) Alexis Copello
  - Women's Pole Vault winner: (Ukraine) Maryna Kylypko
- March 4: Indoor Baltic U18 Championships (final) in Lithuania
  - 60 m winners: (Latvia) Aleksandrs Kucs (m) / (Latvia) Izabella Bogdanova (f)
  - 300 m winners: (Latvia) Aleksandrs Kucs (m) / (Latvia) Izabella Bogdanova (f)
  - 800 m winners: (Latvia) Rojs Puks (m) / (Latvia) Patricija Cīrule (f)
  - 3000 m winners: (Latvia) Armands Štāls (m) / (Latvia) Ilārija Ločmele (f)
  - 60 m Hurdles winners: (Latvia) Kristiāns Skuruls (m) / (Latvia) Marija Elīza Kraule (f)
  - 4 × 200 m winners: Latvia (Kārlis Eiduks, Raivis Sīlis, Aleksandrs Kucs, Roberts Jānis Zālītis) / Latvia (Reina Rozentāle, Nora Ķigure, Marija Medvedeva, Izabella Bogdanova)
  - High Jump winners: (Latvia) Oļegs Kozjakovs (m) / (Latvia) Katrīna Zeļģe Luīze (f)
  - Long Jump winners: (Latvia) Artūrs Šarkovičs (m) / (Latvia) Kitija Paula Melnbārde (f)
  - Triple Jump winners: (Latvia) Artūrs Šarkovičs (m) / (Latvia) Rūta Lasmane (f)
  - Pole Vault winners: (Latvia) Marks Harčenko (m) / (Latvia) Sonija Aškinezere (f)
  - Shot Put winners: (Latvia) Vents Andžejs Lūsis (m) / (Latvia) Aivita Smiļģe (f)

=== EA Outdoor Area Permit Meetings ===
- April 1: XXII Medio Maraton Azkoitia-Azpeitia Memorial Diego Garcia in (Spain) Azpeitia
  - Winners: (Spain) Ivan Arrate Lopez (m) / (Spain) Marina Aznal (f)
- April 1: XII Milla Internacional de Bilbao in Spain
  - Winners: (Spain) Adel Mechaal (m) / (Portugal) Solange Pereira (f)
- May 1: Georgian Open Championships and Caucasian Cup in (Georgia (country)) Tbilisi
- May 14: Meeting Elite de Montgeron in (France) Montgeron
  - 100 m winners: (France) Ken Romain (m) / (France) Carolle Zahi (f)
  - 250 m winners: (Poland) Rafał Omelko (m) / (France) Jennifer Galais (f)
  - 800 m winners: (Algeria) Mohamed Belbachir (m) / (Italy) Yuneysi Santiusti (f)
  - Women's 100 m Hurdles winner: (France) Hanna Plotitsyna
  - Men's 110 m Hurdles winner: (France) Garfield Darien
  - Men's 3000 m Steplechase winner: (Czech Republic) Jakub Holuša
  - Men's High Jump winner: (Mexico) Edgar Rivera
  - Men's Triple Jump winner: (France) Jean-Marc Pontvianne
  - Women's Long Jump: (France) Haoua Kessely
  - Women's Discus Throw: (France) Mélina Robert-Michon
  - Men's Javelin throw winner: (Estonia) Magnus Kirt
- May 25: Riga Cup 2017 in (Latvia) Riga
  - 100 m winners: (Jamaica) Chadic Hinds (m) / (Ukraine) Olesya Povh (f)
  - 200 m winners: (Jamaica) Chadic Hinds (m) / (Ukraine) Yelyzaveta Bryzhina (f)
  - Men's 400 m winner: (Latvia) Jānis Leitis
  - Women's 800 m winner: (Poland) Martyna Galant
  - Men's 400 m Hurdles winner: (Algeria) Abdelmalik Lahoulou
  - Men's 1500 m winner: (Lithuania) Simas Bertašius
  - Men's 3000 m Steplechase winner: (Morocco) Jaouad Chemlal
  - Men's Triple Jump winner: (Bulgaria) Momchil Karailiev
  - Women's Long Jump winner: (Latvia) Aiga Grabuste
  - High Jump winners: (Ukraine) Viktor Lonskyi (m) / (Poland) Urszula Gardzielewska (f)
  - Javelin throw winners: (Lithuania) Edis Matusevičius (m) / (Turkey) Eda Tuğsuz (f)
  - Men's Shot Put winner: (Bosnia and Herzegovina) Mesud Pezer
- May 28: Meeting Elite de Forbach in France
  - 100 m winners: (United States) Diondre Batson (m) / (United States) Alexandria Anderson (f)
  - 400 m winners: (Poland) Rafał Omelko (m) / (Poland) Justyna Święty (f)
  - Men's 800 m winner: (Morocco) Abdelatif Elguesse
  - Men's 100 m Hurdles winner: (France) Benjamin Sedecias
  - Women's 100 m Hurdles winner: (Poland) Karolina Kołeczek
  - Men's Pole Vault winner: (France) Kévin Menaldo
  - Triple Jump winners: (France) Adil Gandou (m) / (Poland) Anna Jagaciak-Michalska (f)
  - Hammer Throw: (France) Quentin Bigot (m) / (Poland) Anita Włodarczyk (f)
- June 10 & 11: Nordic Junior Championships in Combined Events and Compined Events Match in Finland
  - Men's Decathlon winner: (Finland) Elmo Savola
  - Women's Heptathlon winner: (Sweden) Bianca Salming
  - Men's U23 Decathlon winner: (Finland) Tuomas Valle
  - Women's U23 Heptathlon winner: (Finland) Miia Sillman
  - Men's U20 Decathlon winner: (Finland) Leo Uusimäki
  - Women's U20 Heptathlon winner: (Norway) Amanda Grefstad Frøynes
  - Men's U18 Decathlon winner: (Denmark) Mads Lund
  - Women's U18 Heptathlon winner: (Sweden) Erika Wärff
- June 11: Folksam Challenge 1 in Sweden
  - 400 m winners: (Sweden) Felix François (m) / (Sweden) Lisa Duffy (f)
  - Men's 800 m winner: (United Kingdom) Jake Wightman
  - Women's 1500 m winner: (United Kingdom) Katie Snowden
  - Men's 3000 m Steplechase winner: (Australia) Stewart McSweyn
  - Women's 100 m Hurdles winner: (Estonia) Mari Klaup
  - Men's Pole Vault winner: (Sweden) Carl Sténson
  - Triple Jump winners: (Sweden) Erik Ehrlin (m) / (Denmark) Janne Nielsen (f)
  - Women's Long Jump winner: (Norway) Nadia Akpana Assa
  - Men's Discus Throw winner: (Sweden) Simon Pettersson
- June 16: International Match in Hungary
  - Winners: Czech Republic (431 points), 2nd place: Hungary (371.5 points), 3rd place: Slovenia (297 points), 4th place: Slovakia (193.5 points)
- June 18: Janis Lusis Cup in (Latvia) Jelgava
  - Javelin Throw winners: (Latvia) Ansis Brūns (m) / (Latvia) Madara Palameika (f)
  - U20 Javelin Throw winners: (Latvia) Matīss Velps (m) / (Latvia) Aiva Niedra (f)
  - U18 Javelin Throw winners: (Latvia) Krišjānis Suntažs (m) / (Lithuania) Meda Majauskaite (f)
- June 24: XVI Reunion Internacional de Atletismo "Villa De Bilbao" in (Spain) Bilbao
  - 100 m winners: (South Africa) Thando Roto (m) / (United Kingdom) Rachel Miller (f)
  - Men's 200 m winner: (South Africa) Clarence Munyai
  - Men's 400 m winner: (Cuba) Yoandys Lescay
  - 800 m winners: (United Kingdom) Elliot Giles (m) / (Cuba) Rose Mary Almanza (f)
  - Men's 1500 m winner: (Turkey) İlham Tanui Özbilen
  - 3000 m winners: (Morocco) Hamid Ben Daoud (m) / (Portugal) Ana Dulce Félix (f)
  - Men's 3000 m Steplechase winner: (Uganda) Albert Chemutai
  - Long Jump winners: (Cuba) Maykel Massó (m) / (Cuba) Yorgelis Rodríguez (f)
  - Men's Pole Vault winner: (Spain) Gonzalo Santamaría
  - Men's Disc Throw (2 kg) winner: (Spain) Alejandro Vielva Alvarez
  - Women's Disc Throw winner: (Cuba) Yaime Pérez
  - Men's Triple Jump winner: (Cuba) Andy Díaz
  - Women's Javelin Throw winner: (Italy) Zahra Bani
  - Men's Shot Put winner: (Spain) Joaquin Millan Diaz
- July 12: Meeting Int. di Atletica Leggera Sport Solidarieta in (Italy) Lignano Sabbiadoro
  - 100 m winners: (United States) Isiah Young (m) / (United States) English Gardner (f)
  - 400 m winners: (United States) Josephus Lyles (m) / (United States) Phyllis Francis (f)
  - 800 m winners: (Qatar) Jamal Hairane (m) / (United States) Lauren Johnson (f)
  - 1500 m winners: (Kenya) Jonathan Kiplimo Sawe (m) / (Kenya) Selah Jepleting Busienei (f)
  - Women's 100 m Hurdles winner: (United States) Dawn Harper-Nelson
  - Men's 400 m Hurdles winner: (Kenya) Haron Koech
  - Men's High Jump winner: (United States) Bryan McBride
  - Women's Long Jump winner: (Australia) Brooke Stratton
  - Men's Discus Throw winner: (United States) Rodney Brown
- July 12: Joensuu Games in (Finland) Joensuu
  - 100 m winners: (South Africa) Emile Erasmus (m) / (Slovakia) Alexandra Bezeková (f)
  - Men's 200 m winner: (South Africa) Hendrik Maartens
  - 800 m winners: (Japan) Takuma Murashima (m) / (United States) Shannon Osika (f)
  - Men's 5000 m winner: (Morocco) Chakib Lachgar
  - Women's 3000 m winner: (Japan) Kasumi Nishihara
  - Men's 110 m Hurdles winner: (Belarus) Vitali Parakhonka
  - Women's 100 m Hurdles winner: (Nigeria) Lindsay Lindley
  - Men's Discus Throw winner: (Estonia) Martin Kupper
  - Women's Long Jump winner: (Latvia) Aiga Grabuste
  - Javelin Throw winners: (Czech Republic) Jakub Vadlejch (m) / (Iceland) Ásdís Hjálmsdóttir (f)
  - Women's High Jump winner: (Ukraine) Kateryna Tabashnyk
  - Women's Triple Jump winner: (Germany) Neele Eckhardt
  - Men's Hammer Throw winner: (Belarus) Yuri Shayunoi
- July 12: Morton Games in (Republic of Ireland) Dublin
  - Men's 100 m winner: (United States) Jeff Demps
  - Women's 200 m winner: (United Kingdom) Margaret Adeoye
  - Men's 400 m winner: (Republic of Ireland) Brian Gregan
  - 800 m winners: (United Kingdom) Kyle Langford (m) / (United States) Alexa Efraimson (f)
  - 1500 m winners: (United Kingdom) Jack Hallas (m) / (United States) Alexa Efraimson (f)
  - Men's 5000 m winner: (Australia) Stewart McSweyn
  - Men's 1 Mile winner: (United States) Robert Domanic
  - Men's 400 m Hurdles winner: (Chile) Alfredo Sepúlveda
  - Men's Pole Vault winner: (Latvia) Mareks Ārents
  - Women's Discus Throw winner: (United Kingdom) Jade Lally
- July 15: Baltic U16 Championships in Lithuania
  - Teams score: 1st place: Latvia (209 p.), 2nd place: Estonia (194 p.), 3rd place: Lithuania (156 p.)
- July 16: Savo Games in (Finland) Lapinlahti
  - Men's 100 m winner: (South Africa) Emile Erasmus
  - 200 m winners: (Zambia) Sydney Siame (m) / (Slovakia) Alexandra Bezeková (f)
  - 1500 m winners: (Morocco) Chakib Lachgar (m) / (United States) Shannon Osika (f)
  - Men's 3000 m winner: (Japan) Kazuma Taira
  - Women's 3000 m Steplechase winner: (United States) Marisa Howard
  - Men's 110 m Hurdles winner: (Finland) Elmo Lakka
  - Women's 100 m Hurdles winner: (Nigeria) Lindsay Lindley
  - Men's 400 m Hurdles winner: (Estonia) Jaak-Heinrich Jagor
  - Men's Shot Put winner: (Belarus) Mikhail Abramchuk
  - Men's Long Jump winner: (Finland) Kristian Pulli
  - Men's Javelin Throw winner: (Trinidad and Tobago) Keshorn Walcott
  - Women's Discus Throw winner: (Finland) Katri Hirvonen
  - Women's Hammer Throw winner: (Finland) Johanna Salmela
  - Women's High Jump winner: (Ukraine) Kateryna Tabashnyk
- July 18: 66th Cork City Sports in (Republic of Ireland) Cork
  - 100 m winners: (United States) Sean McLean (m) / (United States) Barbara Pierre (f)
  - 200 m winners: (United States) Sean McLean (m) / (Canada) Crystal Emmanuel (f)
  - 800 m winners: (Barbados) Antonio Mascoll (m) / (United States) Laura Roesler (f)
  - Men's 1 mile winner: (United States) Sam Prakel
  - 3000 m winners: (United States) Reid Buchanan (m) / (United States) Sheila Reid
  - Men's 400 m Hurdles: (Puerto Rico) Javier Culson
  - High Jump winners: (United Kingdom) Chris Baker (m) / (United Kingdom) Emma Nuttall (f)
  - Men's Long Jump winner: (United Kingdom) Allan Hamilton
  - Women's Hammer Throw winner: (Sweden) Ida Storm
  - Men's Shot Put winner: (United States) Chukwuebuka Enekwechi
- July 28 & 29: President Cup/ Baltic Team championship in Latvia
  - Latvia win overall gold and medal tabel.
- August 5: Folksam Challenge 2 in Sweden
  - Men's 100 m winner: (Sweden) Alexander Brorsson (m)
  - Men's 300 m winner: (Dominican Republic) Luguelín Santos (m)
  - Men's 400 m winner: (Republic of Ireland) Brian Murphy
  - Men's 800 m winner: (Kenya) Gideon Kipngetich
  - Men's 5000 m winner: (Sweden) Ababa Lama
  - Men's 110 m Hurdles winner: (Sweden) Alexander Brorsson
  - Men's High Jump winner: (Sweden) Fabian Delryd
  - Men's Long Jump winner: (Lithuania) Darius Aučyna
  - Men's Shot Put winner: (Sweden) Daniel Ståhl
  - Men's Hammer Throw winner: (Sweden) Mattias Jons
- August 16: Grand Prix of Sopot – Memorial of Janusz Sidlo in (Poland) Sopot
- August 19: Folksam Challenge 3 in Sweden
- August 19 & 20: Nordic Match U20 in Sweden
- September 3: 7th Kamila Skolimowska Memorial in Poland
- September 30: XXX Milla Internacional de Berango in Spain
- November 27: Maratón Donostia-San Sebastián (final) in Spain

=== EA Road Area Permit Races ===
- January 29: Cross de San Sebastián in Spain
  - Winners: (Bahrain) Sadik Mikhou / (Bahrain) Bontu Edao Rebitu (f)
- February 19: Maratón Ciudad de Sevilla in Spain
  - Winners: (Kenya) Titus Ekiru (m) / (Spain) Paula González Berodia (f)
- April 1: XXII Medio Maraton Azkoitia-Azpeitia Memorial Diego Garcia in (Spain) Azpeitia
  - Winners: (Spain) Ivan Arrate Lopez (m) / (Spain) Marina Aznal (f)
- April 1: XII Milla Internacional de Bilbao in Spain
  - Winners: (Spain) Adel Mechaal (m) / (Portugal) Solange Pereira (f)
- April 23: Madrid Marathon in Spain
  - Winners: (Ethiopia) Bonsa Dida (m) / (Kenya) Elizabeth Rumokol (f)
- April 30: XXII Medio Maraton de Albacete in Spain
  - Winners: (Spain) Ivan Fernandez Anaya (m) / (Kenya) Pamela Cherotick (f)
  - 10 km winners: (Morocco) Jaouad Oumellal (m) / (Spain) Candi García Tejero (f)
- September 30: XXX Milla Internacional de Berango (final) in Spain

=== EA Race Walking Permit Meeting ===
- March 25: Dudinská Päťdesiatka in (Slovakia) Dudince
  - Winners: (Norway) Håvard Haukenes (m) / (Poland) Agnieszka Ellward (f)
- April 8: Podebrady Walking 2017 in Czech Republic
  - U20 10 km walk winners: (Czech Republic) Vojtěch Libnar (m) / (Hungary) Daphne Dimanopulosz (f)
  - Men's U18 10 km walk winner: (Hungary) Bálint Sárossi
  - Women's U18 5 km walk winner: (Lithuania) Austėja Kavaliauskaitė
  - 20 km walk winners: (Lithuania) Genadij Kozlovskij (m) / (Lithuania) Živilė Vaiciukevičiūtė (f)
  - Men's 35 km walk winner: (Hungary) Bence Venyercsán
  - 50 km walk winners: (Norway) Håvard Haukenes (m) / / (Poland) Agnieszka Ellward (f)
- June 9: 43rd International Race Walking Festival in (Lithuania) Alytus (final)
  - 1 km winners: (Lithuania) Arnoldas Petryla (m) / (Lithuania) Sonata Urbonavičiūtė (f)
  - 3 km winners: (Latvia) Raivo Liniņš (m) / (Lithuania) Toma Dailidonyte (f)
  - 5 km winners: (Latvia) Normunds Ivzāns (m) / (Lithuania) Austėja Kavaliauskaitė (m)
  - 10 km winners: (Belarus) Stanislav Kuzmich (m) / (Greece) Athanasía Vaitsi (f)
  - 20 km winners: (Poland) Dawid Tomala (m) / (Lithuania) Brigita Virbalytė-Dimšienė (f0

=== EA Combined Events Area Permit Meeting ===
- June 3–4: VII Meeting Internacional de Arona in Spain
  - Decathlon winner: (Estonia) Taavi Tšernjavski
  - Junior Decathlon winner: (Austria) Leon Okafor
  - Youth Decathlon winner: (Spain) Jorge Davila
  - Heptatlon winner: (Portugal) Marisa Vaz Carvalho (5.755 p.)
  - Youth Heptatlon winner: (Spain) Maria Vicente (5.522 p.)

=== EA Race Walking Area Permit Meetings ===
- August 19 & 20: Nordic RW Match in Sweden

=== Continental events ===
- February 5: European Champion Clubs Cup Cross Country in (Portugal) Albufeira
  - Men's Club winner: (Italy) Gruppo Sportivo Fiamme Oro (Yemaneberhan Crippa, Paolo Zanatta, Pietro Riva, François Marzetta, Simone Gariboldi)
  - Women's Club winner: (Turkey) Üsküdar Belediyespor (Irene Chepet Cheptai, Esma Aydemir, Özlem Kaya, Alemitu Bekele Degfa, Aslı Çakır Alptekin, Elif Karabulut, Emine Hatun Tuna)
- February 12: Balkan Junior Indoor Championships in Istanbul
  - Bulgaria won the gold medal tally. Turkey won the overall medal tally.
- February 12: Central American Race Walking Championships in Guatemala City
  - U14 winners: (Guatemala) Shavi Daniel Guerra García (m) / (Guatemala) Yaquelin Mishell Teletor Jerónimo (f)
  - U16 winners: (Guatemala) Luis Luciano Tzunun Cabrera (m) / (Guatemala) Glendy Verónica Teletor Jerónimo (f)
  - U18 winners: (Guatemala) José Eduardo Ortíz Flores (m) / (El Salvador) Melany Nicolle Elías Trejo (f)
  - U20 winners: (Guatemala) Anibal Xiquin Zapeta (m) / (Guatemala) Yasuri Palacios San José (f)
  - Winners: (Guatemala) José Alejandro Barrondo (m) / (Guatemala) Mayra Herrera (f)
- February 19: South American Cross Country Championships in (Chile) Santiago
  - Winners: (Peru) René Champi (m) / (Ecuador) Carmen Toaquiza (f)
  - Juniors winners: (Brazil) Daniel Ferreira do Nascimento (m) / (Peru) Rina Cjuro (f)
  - Youth winners: (Chile) Patricio Pinto Quinchahual (m) / (Chile) Laura Acuña Vidal (f)
  - Mixed relay winners: Peru
- February 19: Oceania Race Walking Championships in (Australia) Adelaide
  - Winners: (Australia) Dane Bird-Smith (m) / (Australia) Regan Lamble (f)
- February 25: Balkan Athletics Indoor Championships in Belgrade
  - Greece and Serbia won the gold medal tally. Greece won the overall medal tally.
- February 26: Central American Cross Country Championships in El Salvador
  - Winners: (El Salvador) Williams Alexander Sánchez (m) / (Costa Rica) Mónica Vargas (f)
  - U20 winners: (El Salvador) Erick Saúl Hernández Salguero (m) / (El Salvador) Mirta Hércules (f)
  - U18 winners: (Costa Rica) Damian Raimundo García Isaacs (m) / (El Salvador) Sara Martina Hernández Moran (f)
  - U16 winners: (Costa Rica) Andy Felipe Córdoba (m) / (El Salvador) Daniela Alexandra Aragón Valencia (f)
  - U14 winners: (Nicaragua) Alejandro José Plata Sequeira (m) / (El Salvador) Jenifer Beatriz Salas Acosta (f)
  - Mixt relay 4 x 1000 m winners: El Salvador A (Erick Saúl Hernández Salguero, Brenda Alejandrina Salmerón Menjivar, Mirta Hércules, David Alexander Escobar Castillo)
  - Youth Mixt Relay 4 x 500 m winners: Costa Rica (Alexandra Barrios Jiménez, Andy Felipe Córdoba, Damian Raimundo García Isaacs, Mariana Alexandra Muñoz Alvarado)
- March 3–5: 2017 European Athletics Indoor Championships in (Serbia) Belgrade
  - Poland won the gold medal tally and the overall medal tally.
- March 4: NACAC Cross Country Championships in Boca Raton
  - Winners: (United States) Abbabiya Simbassa (m) / (Canada) Sasha Gollish (f)
  - Juniors winners: (Canada) Kiernan Lumb (m) / (Canada) Brogan MacDougall (f)
  - Team winners: United States (m) / Canada (f)
  - Juniors Team winners: United States (m) / Canada (f)
- March 11 & 12: 2017 European Throwing Cup in (Spain) Las Palmas
  - Discus Throw winners: (Austria) Lukas Weisshaidinger (m) / (France) Mélina Robert-Michon (f)
  - U23 Discus Throw winners: (Romania) Alin Alexandru Firfirică (m) / (Germany) Claudine Vita (f)
  - Javelin Throw winners: (Germany) Julian Weber (m) / (Slovenia) Martina Ratej (f)
  - U23 Javelin Throw winners: (Moldova) Adrian Mardari (m) / (Croatia) Sara Kolak (f)
  - Hammer Throw winners: (France) Quentin Bigot (m) / (France) Alexandra Tavernier (f)
  - U23 Hammer Throw winners: (Germany) Alexej Mikhailov (m) / (Sweden) Marinda Petersson (f)
  - Shot Put winners: (Bosnia and Herzegovina) Mesud Pezer (m) / (Hungary) Anita Márton (f)
  - U23 Shot Put winners: (Turkey) Osman Can Özdeveci (m) / (Sweden) Fanny Roos (f)
- March 18: South American Half Marathon Championships in Uruguay
  - Winners: (Brazil) Damião Ancelmo de Souza (m) / (Peru) Clara Cachanya (f)
- March 19: Asian Race Walking Championships in (Japan) Nomi
  - Winners: (South Korea) Kim Hyun-sub (m) / (China) Wang Na (f)
- March 19: South American Marathon Championships in (Chile) Temuco
  - Winners: (Chile) Enzo Yáñez (m) / (Brazil) Mirela Saturnino de Andrade (f)
- April 8: Balkan Race Walking Championships in (Greece) Florina
  - 20 km winners: (Greece) Alexandros Papamichail (m) / (Greece) Antigoni Drisbioti (f)
  - U20 10 km winners: (Turkey) Abdülselam İmuk (m) / (Greece) Sofia Alikanioti (f)
  - Men's U18 10 km winner: (Turkey) Umut Temel
  - Women's U18 5 km winner: (Turkey) Kader Dost
- May 6 & 7: South American Junior Championships in Athletics in Leonora
  - Points winners: 1st. Brazil, 2nd. Guyana, 3rd. Colombia
  - Medal winners: 1st. Brazil, 2nd. Ecuador, 3rd. Colombia
- May 14: Balkan Half Marathon Championships in (Kosovo) Pristina
  - Winners: (Turkey) Serkan Kaya (m) / (Turkey) Şeyma Yıldız (f)
  - Teams winners: Turkey (m) / Turkey (f)
- May 20 – 23: 2017 Asian Youth Athletics Championships in (Thailand) Bangkok
  - China won the gold medal tally and the overall medal tally.
- May 21: European Race Walking Cup in (Czech Republic) Poděbrady
  - Women's 10 km winner: (Russia) Yana Smerdova
  - Men's 20 km winner: (Germany) Christopher Linke (m) / (Italy) Antonella Palmisano (f)
  - Men's 50 km winner: (Ukraine) Ivan Banzeruk
  - Men's U20 10 km winner: (Germany) Leo Köpp
- May 26 – 28: 2017 Central American Junior and Youth Championships in Athletics in (Nicaragua) Managua
- May 27 & 28: European Champion Clubs Cup–Group B in (Portugal) Leiria
  - Winners: (Italy) Atletica Riccardi (m) / (Italy) ASD Bracco Atletica (f)
- June 3: Balkan Youth Championships in Istanbul
  - Turkey won the gold medal tally and the overall medal tally.
- June 10: European Cup 10,000m in Minsk
  - Winners: (Spain) Antonio Abadía (m) / (Portugal) Sara Moreira
  - Teams winners: Spain (m) / Belarus (f)
- June 10: Balkan Mountain Running Championships in (Bulgaria) Teteven
  - Seniors winners: (Romania) Cătălin Atănăsoaie (m) / (Romania) Denisa Dragomir (f)
  - U20 winners: (Turkey) Orhan Öztürk (m) / (Turkey) Atalay Bahar (f)
- June 23–25: 2017 Central American Championships in Athletics in (Honduras) Tegucigalpa
- June 24 & 25: 2017 European Team Championships Super League in (France) Lille
  - Teams winner: Germany (321.5 points)
  - Relegated to 1st League: Belarus, Netherlands and Russia
- June 23–25: European Athletics Team Championships, 1st League in Vaasa
  - Teams winner: Sweden (321.5 points)
  - Promoted to Super League: Sweden, Finland and Switzerland, relegated to 2nd League: Estonia, Bulgaria and Denmark
- June 24 & 25: European Athletics Team Championships, 2 League in (Israel) Tel Aviv
  - Teams winner: Hungary (372.5 points)
  - Promoted to 1st League: Hungary, Slovakia and Lithuania, relegated to 3rd League: Serbia, Iceland and Moldova
- June 24 & 25: European Athletics Team Championships, 3 League in (Malta) Marsa
  - Teams winner: Luxembourg (317 points)
  - Promoted to 2nd League: Luxembourg, Bosnia and Herzegovina and Georgia.
- June 28–30: 2017 Oceania Athletics Championships in (Fiji) Suva
  - U18: Australia won the gold medal tally and the overall medal tally.
  - U20: Australia won the gold medal tally and the overall medal tally.
  - Seniors: Papua New Guinea won the gold medal tally. Papua New Guinea and Australia won the overall medal tally.
- June 29 – July 2: 2017 African Junior Athletics Championships in (Algeria) Tlemcen
  - Ethiopia won the gold medal tally and the overall medal tally.
- July 1 & 2: European Combined Events Team Championships in (Estonia) Tallinn
  - Winners: Ukraine
  - Decathlon winners: 1st: (Estonia) Janek Õiglane, 2nd: (Ukraine) Oleksiy Kasyanov, 3rd: (Netherlands) Karl Robert Saluri
  - Heptathlon winners: 1st: (Ukraine) Alina Shukh, 2nd: (Switzerland) Géraldine Ruckstuhl, 3rd: (Estonia) Grit Šadeiko
- July 1 & 2: European Combined Events Team Championships 1 & 2 Leagues in (Spain) Monzón
  - 1st League Winners: Netherlands
  - Decathlon winners: 1st: (Spain) Jorge Ureña, 2nd: (Sweden) Marcus Nilsson, 3rd: (Netherlands) Bas Markies
  - Heptathlon winners: 1st: (Netherlands) Nadine Broersen, 2nd: (Czech Republic) Eliška Klučinová, 3rd: (Portugal) Lecabela Quaresma
  - 2nd League winners: Lithuania
  - Decathlon winners: 1st: (Norway) Martin Roe, 2nd: (Norway) Lars Vikan Rise, 3rd: (Latvia) Edgars Eriņš
  - Heptathlon winners: 1st: (Slovakia) Lucia Slaničková, 2nd: (Lithuania) Austra Skujytė, 3rd: (Republic of Ireland) Kate O'Connor
- July 1 & 2: Balkan Junior Championships in (Romania) Craiova
  - Turkey won the gold medal tally and the overall medal tally.
- July 2: Oceania Marathon and Half Marathon Championships in (Australia) Gold Coast
  - Marathon winners: (New Zealand) Dave Ridley (m) / (Australia) Virginia Moloney (f)
  - Half Marathon winners: (Australia) Timothy Lefroy (m) / (Australia) Eloise Wellings (f)
- July 6–9: 2017 Asian Athletics Championships in Bhubaneswar
  - India won the gold medal tally and the overall medal tally.
- July 8: European Mountain Running Championships in (Slovenia) Kamnik
  - Seniors: (Italy) Xavier Chevrier (m) / (Switzerland) Maude Mathys (f)
  - U20: (Romania) Gabriel Bularda (m) / (Germany) Lisa Oed (f)
- July 13–16: 2017 European Athletics U23 Championships in Bydgoszcz
  - 100 m winners: (United Kingdom) Ojie Edoburun (m) / (Poland) Ewa Swoboda (f)
  - 200 m winners: (Slovakia) Ján Volko (m) / (United Kingdom) Finette Agyapong (f)
  - 400 m winners: (Slovenia) Luka Janežič (m) / (Latvia) Gunta Latiševa-Čudare (f)
  - 800 m winners: (Sweden) Andreas Kramer (m) / (Belgium) Renée Eykens (f)
  - 1500 m winners: (Germany) Marius Probst (m) / (Germany) Konstanze Klosterhalfen (f)
  - 5000 m winners: (Italy) Yemaneberhan Crippa (m) / (Turkey) Yasemin Can (f)
  - 10000 m winners: (Spain) Carlos Mayo (m) / (Turkey) Yasemin Can (f)
  - Men's 3000 m steeplechase winners: (Italy) Yohanes Chiappinelli
  - Men's 110 m Hurdles winner: (France) Ludovic Payen
  - Women's 100 m Hurdles winner: (Netherlands) Nadine Visser
  - 400 m Hurdles winners: (Norway) Karsten Warholm (m) / (Italy) Ayomide Folorunso (f)
  - High Jump winners: (Belarus) Dzmitry Nabokau (m) / (Ukraine) Yuliya Levchenko (f)
  - Pole Vault winners: (Belgium) Ben Broeders (m) / (Switzerland) Angelica Moser (f)
  - Long Jump winners: (Ukraine) Vladyslav Mazur (m) / (France) Yanis David (f)
  - Triple Jump winners: (Azerbaijan) Nazim Babayev (m) / (Romania) Elena Panțuroiu (f)
  - Shot Put winners: (Poland) Konrad Bukowiecki (m) / (Sweden) Fanny Roos (f)
  - Discus Throw winners: (Norway) Sven Martin Skagestad (m) / (Germany) Claudine Vita (f)
  - Hammer Throw winners: (Hungary) Bence Halász (m) / (Ukraine) Alyona Shamotina (f)
  - Javelin Throw winners: (Hungary) Norbert Rivasz-Tóth (m) / (Croatia) Sara Kolak (f)
  - Men's Decathlon winner: (Czech Republic) Jiří Sýkora (8084 p.)
  - Women's Heptathlon winner: (Switzerland) Caroline Agnou (f) (6330 p.)
  - Women's 4 × 100 m winners: Spain
  - 4 × 400 m winners: Germany (m) / Poland (f)
  - 20 km walk winners: (Spain) Diego García (m) / (Russia) Klavdiya Afanasyeva (f)
- July 15 & 16: Balkan Athletics Championships in Novi Pazar
  - 100 m winners: (Turkey) Jak Ali Harvey (m) / (Greece) Katerina Dalaka (f)
  - 200 m winners: (Turkey) Jak Ali Harvey (m) / (Greece) Emmanouella Keramida (f)
  - 400 m winners: (Croatia) Mateo Ružić (m) / (Romania) Bianca Răzor (f)
  - 800 m winners: (Bosnia and Herzegovina) Abedin Mujezinović (m) / (Serbia) Amela Terzić (f)
  - 400 m Hurdles winners: (Croatia) Yan Eloi Senjarić (m) / (Turkey) Elif Yıldırım (f)
  - 1500 m winners: (Bulgaria) Mitko Tsenov (m) / (Serbia) Amela Terzić (f)
  - 3000 m winners: (Albania) David Nikolli (m) / (Romania) Adela Bălțoi (f)
  - 3000 m steeplechase winners: (Bosnia and Herzegovina) Osman Junuzović (m) / (Romania) Adela Bălțoi (f)
  - 5000 m winners: (Bulgaria) Yolo Nikolov (m) / (Romania) Cristina Negru (f)
  - Men's 110 m Hurdles winner: (Romania) Cosmin Ilie Dumitrache
  - Women's 100 m Hurdles winner: (Greece) Elisavet Pesiridou
  - Pole Vault winners: (Croatia) Ivan Horvat (m) / (Cyprus) Maria Aristotelous (f)
  - High Jump winners: (Greece) Konstadinos Baniotis (m) / (Greece) Tatiana Gousin (f)
  - Long Jump winners: (Serbia) Lazar Anić (m) / (Greece) Chaido Alexouli (f)
  - Triple Jump winners: (Bulgaria) Momchil Karailiev (m) / (Romania) Carmen Toma (f)
  - Hammer Throw winners: (Turkey) Özkan Baltacı (m) / (Moldova) Zalina Petrivskaya (f)
  - Discus Throw winners: (Croatia) Martin Marić (m) / (Serbia) Dragana Tomašević (f)
  - Javelin Throw winners: (Serbia) Branko Pauković (m) / (Serbia) Marija Vučenović (f)
  - Shot Put winners: (Bosnia and Herzegovina) Mesud Pezer (m) / (Moldova) Dimitriana Surdu (f)
  - Men's Decathlon winner: (Serbia) Aleksandar Grnović (7.225 p.)
  - Women's Heptathlon winner: (Bosnia and Herzegovina) Mladena Petrušić (4.796 p.)
  - 4 × 100 m winners: Romania (Marius Florin Şerban, Alexandru Terpezan, Ionuţ Andrei Neagoe, Daniel Mihai Budin) / Serbia (Ivana Petković, Katarina Sirmić, Tamara Vuletić, Milana Tirnanić) (f)
  - 4 × 400 m winners: Serbia (Stjepan Bojanić, Igor Garaj, Ivan Marković, Stefan Vukadinović) (m) / Romania (Camelia Florina Gal, Anamaria Ioniță, Roxana Maria Ene, Bianca Răzor) (f)
- July 20–23: 2017 European Athletics U20 Championships in (Italy) Grosseto
  - Germany and United Kingdom won the gold medal tally. Great Britain won the overall medal tally.
- October 8: Balkan Marathon Championships in (Croatia) Zagreb
- November 11: Balkan Cross Country Championships in (Turkey) Çanakkale
- November 17: South American Mountain Running Championships in (Argentina) Villa La Angostura
- November 24–26: U14 & U16 Central American Championships in Athletics in (Costa Rica) San José
- December 10: European Cross Country Championships in (Slovakia) Šamorín

== Deaths ==
Athlete	Nation	Occupation	Age	Date	Ref
Joyce Murland	Canada	Wheelchair athlete	79	19 January	
Anne-Marie Colchen	France	High jumper	91	26 January	
Nadiya Olizarenko	Ukraine	Middle-distance runner	63	18 February	
Johannes Lahti	Finland	Decathlete	64	1 March	
Charles Eugster	United Kingdom	Masters sprinter	97	27 April	
