= Jemima Montag =

Australian racewalker (born 1998)

Personal information
- Born: 15 February 1998 (age 28) East Melbourne, Victoria, Australia
- Height: 159 cm (5 ft 3 in)
- Weight: 50 kg (110 lb)

Sport
- Sport: Racewalking
- Event: 20 km walk
- Coached by: Brent Vallance

Achievements and titles
- Personal best: 20 km walk: 1:27:09
Medal record
Women's athletics
Representing Australia
Olympic Games
Bronze medal – third place	2024 Paris	20 km walk
Bronze medal – third place	2024 Paris	Mixed marathon walk relay
World Championships
Silver medal – second place	2023 Budapest	20 km walk
Commonwealth Games
Gold medal – first place	2018 Gold Coast	20 km walk
Gold medal – first place	2022 Birmingham	10000 m walk
Gold medal – first place	2026 Glasgow	10000 m walk

Jemima Montag (born 15 February 1998) is an Australian Olympic racewalker. She won the silver medal in the 2023 World Athletics Championships, won bronze medals in the 20 km walk and the Marathon walk relay in the Paris 2024 Olympics, and is a two-time Commonwealth Games champion.

== Early and private life ==
Montag was born in East Melbourne, Victoria, and is Jewish. Her parents are Ray (whose parents are Holocaust survivors) and Amanda Montag, who met at the 1989 Maccabiah Games in Israel, where Ray was competing in cricket and Amanda was competing in the heptathlon for Australia. Montag's paternal grandmother, born Judyta Joachimsmann in the town of Wieliczka, Poland, was a survivor of the Auschwitz concentration camp, and the Auschwitz death march. Montag plans to write a book about her grandmother's experiences.

Montag is studying for a postgraduate medical degree and a Master of public health at medical school at the University of Melbourne, where she previously earned a Bachelor of Science. She also works at a company that delivers food to underprivileged families.

== Career ==
Montag is coached by former racewalker Brent “CV” Vallance.

Prior to her walking career, she studied ballet at the national theatre ballet school in st kilda, Victoria. Under the training of Beverly Jane Fry.

She began taking part in Little Athletics when she was seven, encouraged by her mother, who was herself a hurdler. She was inspired by Cathy Freeman, as well as her contemporaries Regan Lamble and Steven Solomon. A Jewish Australian, at age 15 was recognised for her wins at the state and national championships with the Australian 2013 Outstanding Jewish Junior Sportswoman of the Year Award.

She made her first impact with a win in the under-20 section at the 2014 Oceania Race Walking Championships. A global medal came later that May, as she placed twelfth in the 10 kilometres walk at the 2014 IAAF World Race Walking Cup and shared in the team bronze with Clara Smith and Elizabeth Hosking. She graduated high school from Wesley College in 2016.

She was the Australian team's flag bearer at the 2017 Maccabiah Games in Israel, where she won a silver medal in the 10 km race walk.

=== 2018–22; Commonwealth Games champion ===
Montag earned selection for Australia at the 2018 Commonwealth Games through a silver medal performance behind Beki Smith at the 2018 Australia and Oceania Race Walking Championships, setting a personal best of 1:31:26 hours in her second ever competitive outing over the 20 km distance.

Montag was the gold medalist of the 20 kilometres race walk at the 2018 Commonwealth Games, at 20 years of age. She had been leading alongside fellow Australian Claire Tallent, but was assured of the win when Tallent was disqualified in the final stage of the race.

She came in sixth in the final of the Women's 20 km walk in the Tokyo 2020 Olympics in a time of 1:30.39, at 23 years of age.

Montag won the gold medal at the 2022 Commonwealth Games, repeating in the 20 kilometers race walk.

In March 2022, she was inducted into the Maccabi Victoria Hall of Fame.

=== 2023–present; World Championships silver medal ===
At the 2023 World Athletics Championships in Budapest, Montag won the silver medal in the women's 20 km walk, 25 seconds behind the winner.

in May 2023, she received the UniSport Australia award for the most outstanding performance by a student-athlete.

In February 2024, at the Oceania and Australian championships, Montag won the women's 20 km race in 1 hour, 27 minutes, and 9 seconds, breaking the Oceania and Australian record that she herself had set previously by 7 seconds.

In April 2024 at the Maccabi Australia Sport Awards she was awarded the President's Award and the Victorian outstanding sportswoman award. In July 2024, she was ranked #3 in the world. In preparation for the Paris 2024 Olympics, she declared to Australian-Jewish media outlet, The Jewish Independent, she wanted to be best in the world.

=== 2024 Paris Olympics bronze medals ===
Montag represented Australia at the 2024 Summer Olympics in Paris in the women's 20 kilometres walk on 1 August and with Rhydian Cowley in the mixed marathon walk relay on 3 August 2024. She won the bronze medal in both events, and was the first Australian woman in 52 years to win two medals in track and field at the same Olympic Games.

== International competitions ==
Year	Competition	Venue	Position	Event	Notes
2014	Oceania Race Walking Championships	Hobart, Australia	1st	10 km walk (junior)	47:00
2014	World Race Walking Cup	Taicang, China	12th	10 km walk (junior)	47:34
2014	World Race Walking Cup	Taicang, China	3rd	Team	20 pts
2018	Oceania Race Walking Championships	Adelaide Australia	2nd	20 km walk	1:31:26
2018	Commonwealth Games	Gold Coast, Australia	1st	20 km walk	1:32:50
2019	Oceania Race Walking Championships	Townsville, Australia	1st	10 km walk	43:50:84
2019	Summer Universiade	Naples, Italy	2nd	20 km walk	1:33:57
2019	World Championships	Doha, Qatar	10th	20 km walk	1:36:54
2019	Australian 50 km Race Walking Championships	Melbourne, Australia	2nd	20 km walk	1:37:22

== See also ==
- List of Australian records in athletics
- List of Commonwealth Games medallists in athletics (women)
- List of Commonwealth Games records in athletics
- List of select Jewish track and field athletes
- List of Jewish Olympic medalists
- List of Oceania Area Championships in Athletics records
- List of Oceanian records in athletics
- List of World Athletics Championships medalists (women)
