= Athletics at the 2018 Commonwealth Games – Women's 20 kilometres walk =

Women's 20 kilometres walk at the 2018 Commonwealth Games
- Venue: Southport Broadwater Parklands
- Dates: 8 April 2018
- Competitors: 13 from 8 nations
- Winning time: 1:32:50

Medalists
gold medal	Jemima Montag	Australia
silver medal	Alana Barber	New Zealand
bronze medal	Bethan Davies	Wales

The women's 20 kilometres walk at the 2018 Commonwealth Games, as part of the athletics programme, took place at Currumbin Beachfront on 8 April 2018.

== Records ==
Prior to this competition, the existing world and Games records were as follows:

World record	Liu Hong (CHN)	1:24:38	A Coruña, Spain	6 June 2015
Games record	Jane Saville (AUS)	1:32:46	Melbourne, Australia	20 March 2006

== Schedule ==
The schedule was as follows:

Date	Time	Round
Sunday 8 April 2018	9:15	Race

All times are Australian Eastern Standard Time (UTC+10)

== Results ==
The results were as follows:

Rank	Order	Name	Result	Notes	Race violations
1st place, gold medalist(s)	10	Jemima Montag (AUS)	1:32:50		
2nd place, silver medalist(s)	9	Alana Barber (NZL)	1:34:18		~
3rd place, bronze medalist(s)	4	Bethan Davies (WAL)	1:36:08		~
4	3	Khushbir Kaur (IND)	1:39:21		
5	11	Gemma Bridge (ENG)	1:39:31		
6	13	Beki Smith (AUS)	1:40:41		
7	1	Heather Lewis (WAL)	1:41:45		
8	12	Grace Wanjiru (KEN)	1:42:23		
9	6	Erika Kelly (IOM)	1:47:29		
10	2	Fadekemi Florence Olude (NGR)	1:49:31		>>
11	7	Lindah Waweru (KEN)	1:53:41		>
–	5	Claire Tallent (AUS)	DQ	R 230.6	~~~
–	8	Soumya Baby (IND)	DQ	R 230.6	~~~

Notes

- > Bent knee
- ~ Loss of contact
