= Alana Barber =

New Zealand racewalker (born 1987)

Personal information
- Born: 8 July 1987 (age 39) Auckland, New Zealand
- Height: 1.63 m (5 ft 4 in)
- Weight: 52 kg (115 lb)

Sport
- Country: New Zealand
- Sport: Track and field
- Event: 20 km race walk

Achievements and titles
- National finals: 20 km walk champion (2018)
- Personal bests: 3000 m walk – 12:37.82; 5000 m walk – 21:59.41; 10,000 m walk – 46:03.24; 20 km walk – 1:32:19
Medal record
Women's athletics
Representing New Zealand
Commonwealth Games
Silver medal – second place	2018 Gold Coast	20 km walk

Alana Barber (born 8 July 1987) is a New Zealand race walker who won a silver medal in the 20 km race walk at the 2018 Commonwealth Games.

== Early life and family ==
Barber was born in Auckland on 8 July 1987, the daughter of Shirley Somervell, who represented New Zealand at the 1974 British Commonwealth Games finishing seventh in the final of the 800 m. Barber was educated at Diocesan School for Girls, Auckland.

== Athletics ==
Barber competed in the 20 kilometres race walk at the 2015 World Championships in Athletics, finishing 18th and setting a New Zealand record of 1:33:20. The following year, at the Rio 2016 Summer Olympics, she recorded a time of 1:35:55 in finishing 35th in the same event.

Her inaugural New Zealand national title came in the 20 km race walk in Hamilton in 2018.

In the 20 km walk at the 2018 Commonwealth Games on the Gold Coast, Barber won the silver medal, finishing in a time of 1:34:18, 1:28 behind the winner, Jemima Montag of Australia.

Barber announced her retirement on 17 September 2021.
