= Lamble =

Lamble is a surname of British origin and may refer to:

- Lloyd Lamble (1914–2008), Australian actor
- Martin Lamble (1949–1969), British drummer
- Regan Lamble (born 1991), Australian athlete
