= St Marys Senior High School =

Location
- St Marys, Western Sydney, New South Wales; Australia; 33°45′48″S 150°46′12″E

Information
- Type: Government-funded co-educational dual modality partially academically selective and comprehensive post-compulsory secondary day school
- Motto: Latin: Mente Manuque (With Mind & Hand)
- Established: 1989; 37 years ago
- Educational authority: New South Wales Department of Education
- Principal: Sally Smithard
- Years: 11–12
- Enrolment: ~900 (2008)
- Campus: Suburban
- Colours: Green, white, yellow, grey and black
- Website: stmaryssen-h.schools.nsw.gov.au

St Marys Senior High School is a government-funded co-educational dual modality partially academically selective and comprehensive post-compulsory secondary day school, located in St Marys, a suburb in western Sydney, New South Wales, Australia.

Established in 1989, the school is the first New South Wales Department of Education senior high school and currently caters for approximately 900 students in Year 11 and Year 12.

== History ==
The school opened in 1989.

In 2008, a St Marys Senior High School student was awarded first place in the Society and Culture HSC exam. In the 2008 HSC exams, St Marys Senior High School had 5 students achieve recognition on the Board of Studies All Rounders List.

== Notable alumni ==
- Rebecca Lee – race walker and Australian representative to the 2012 Olympics
- Paige Hadley – netballer
- Grentperez – Filipino-Australian musician

== See also ==
- List of government schools in New South Wales
- List of selective high schools in New South Wales
