= Charles Eugster =

UK-born Swiss masters sportsperson (1919–2017)

Personal information
- Citizenship: United Kingdom, Switzerland
- Born: Charles Marin Eugster; 26 July 1919 London, England
- Died: 26 April 2017 (aged 97) London, England
- Education: University of Zurich
- Occupations: Athlete, Dentist
Medal record
Men's athletics
Representing United Kingdom
World Masters Athletics Championships (M95)
Gold medal – first place	2015 Lyon	100 m
Gold medal – first place	2015 Lyon	200 m
European Masters Indoor Championships (M95)
Gold medal – first place	2015 Torun	60m
Gold medal – first place	2015 Torun	200m
Gold medal – first place	2016 Ancona	60m

Charles Marin Eugster FRSM (26 July 1919 – 26 April 2017) was a UK-born Swiss track and field and sprint athlete and former dentist. After spending a career as a dentist, he moved to Uitikon, Switzerland, on his pension. At age 85, he began a fitness program. "I looked in the mirror one morning, and I didn't like what I saw."

Eugster was born in London in 1919 to Swiss parents. He won more than 100 fitness awards in multiple sports, including bodybuilding and rowing. He won multiple medals at the World Masters Regatta.

He was invited to do a talk at TEDx in Zürich in 2012 and gave a talk titled "Why bodybuilding at age 93 is a great idea".

Eugster died on 26 April 2017 of complications following heart failure at the age of 97.
