= Rachel Tallent =

Australian racewalker

Personal information
- Born: 20 February 1993 (age 33) Ballarat, Australia

Sport
- Country: Australia
- Sport: Track and field
- Updated on 29 August 2015

Rachel Tallent (born 20 February 1993) is a female racewalker from Australia. She competed in the Women's 20 kilometres walk event at the 2015 World Championships in Athletics in Beijing, China. She also competed in the 2016 Olympics, while racing with a stress reaction in her left femur. She is the sister of Olympic Champion Jared Tallent who was previously her coach.

== See also ==
- Australia at the 2015 World Championships in Athletics
