= Claire Woods =

Australian racewalker

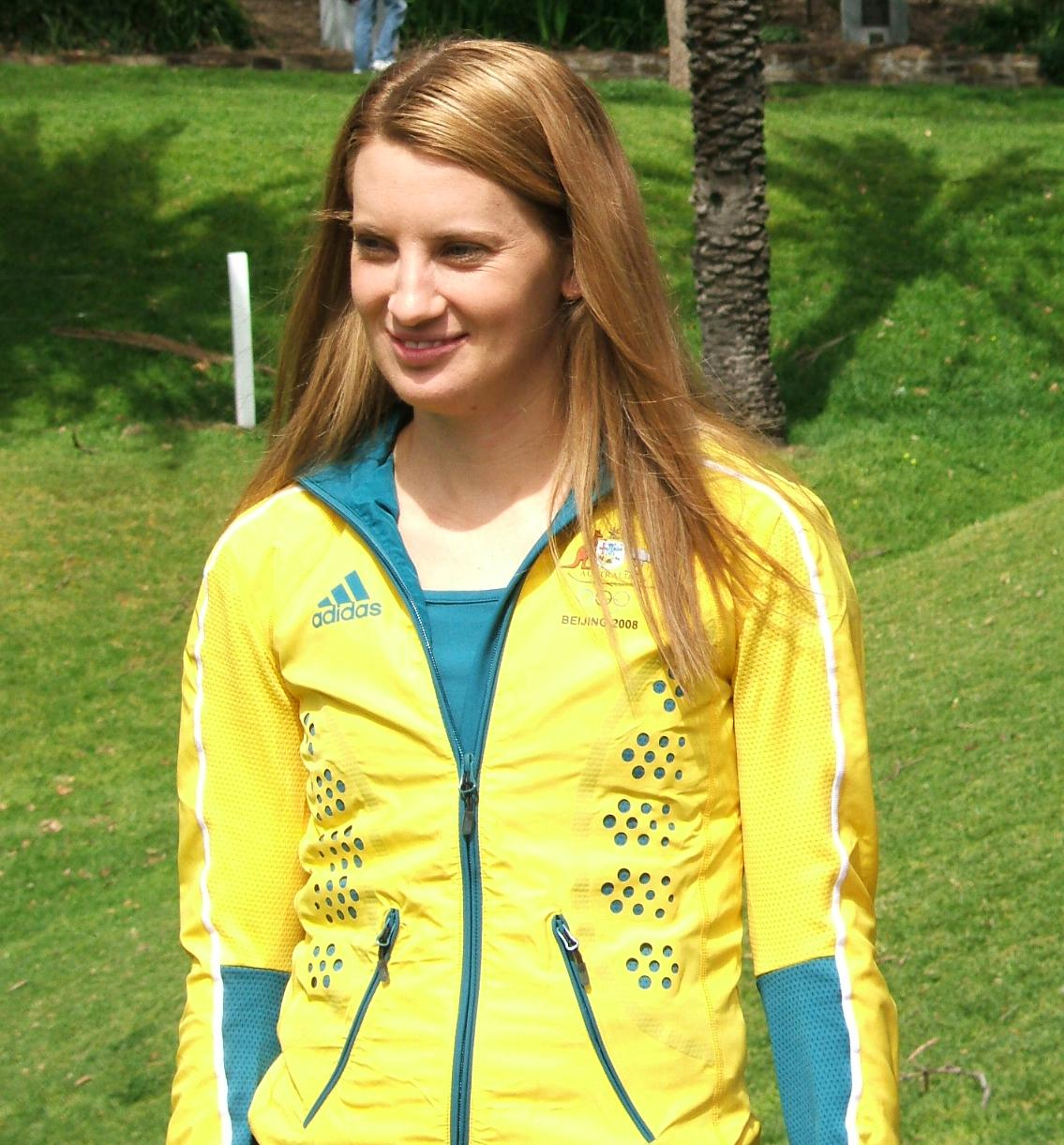
Claire Tallent in 2008

Claire Woods (born 6 July 1981), also known as Claire Tallent, is an Australian racewalker.

== Early life and education ==
Claire Woods was born on 6 July 1981.

She attended Mary MacKillop College in the Adelaide suburb of Kensington, graduating in 1998.

== Career ==
Woods has represented Australia at the Olympic Games, Commonwealth Games and World Championships in Athletics.

Woods made her international debut at the World Walking Cup in Naumburg, Germany in 2004 in the 20 km walk.

At her first Olympics, she finished in 28th place in an equal personal best of 1:33:02.

Woods was 19th at the 2010 IAAF World Race Walking Cup in Chihuhua, Mexico and claimed silver in the 2010 Commonwealth Games in New Delhi, behind England's Johanna Jackson.

She began her 2011 season with a husband and wife double at the Australian 20 km walk championships, taking the women's title while her husband won on the men's side.

In March 2012, Woods achieved a lifetime best of 1:28:53 in the 20 km walk. She then achieved the 1st position in both the 5000m and 10 km events at the Oceania Championships.

At the 2012 Olympic Games in London, Woods was in tenth place in the Women's 20 km walk at 12 km but was disqualified shortly after.

Woods retired from international competition in 2012 and coached her husband Jared Tallent to a medal at every major championship, culminating in a silver medal in the 50 km walk at the 2016 Rio Olympics.

After a hiatus from competition, Woods came 43rd in the Women's 20 km walk at the 2017 World Championships in Athletics, just eleven weeks after giving birth to her son.

While leading the 20 km walk at the 2018 Commonwealth Games on the Gold Coast, she was disqualified approximately 2 km from the finishing line.

Weeks after her disqualification, she finished third at the World Athletics Race Walking Team Championships in Taicang, China in the women's 50 km walk in an Oceania and Australian record of 4:09:33.

In January 2019, Woods won the Women's 50 km walk at the USA National Championships in Santee, California in a time of 4:12:44. This performance, when combined with her Oceania record, saw Woods become the world's number one ranked 50 km walker for four weeks in 2019.

In 2019 Woods was one of five female international race walkers that failed in an appeal to the Court of Arbitration for Sport (CAS) to have the Women's 50 km walk included in the Tokyo Olympics program.

== Personal life ==
Weeks after the Beijing Olympics (in August 2008), Woods married international racewalker and Olympic gold medallist Jared Tallent in Walkerville, South Australia, and for some time, changed her name to Claire Tallent. They had two children, born in 2013 and 2017 by IVF.

They were later divorced, and Woods reverted to her birth name.

== Achievements ==
| Year | Competition | Venue | Position | Event | Notes |
Representing Australia
| 2007 | Universiade | Bangkok, Thailand | 14th | 20 km | 1:45:07 hrs |
| 2008 | Olympic Games | Beijing, China | 27th | 20 km | 1:33:02 hrs |
| 2009 | World Championships | Berlin, Germany | 27th | 20 km | 1:38:12 hrs |
| 2010 | Commonwealth Games | New Delhi, India | 2nd | 20 km | 1:36:55 hrs |
| 2011 | World Championships | Daegu, South Korea | 21st | 20 km | 1:34:46 hrs |
| 2012 | Oceania Championships (Regional Division West) | Cairns, Australia | 1st | 5000 m | 21:57.48 min |
| 2012 | Oceania Championships (Regional Division West) | Cairns, Australia | 1st | 10 km | 44.19 min |
| 2012 | Olympic Games | London, United Kingdom | – | 20 km | DQ |
| 2017 | World Championships | London, United Kingdom | 43rd | 20 km | 1:37:05 |
| 2018 | Commonwealth Games | Gold Coast, Australia | – | 20 km | DQ |
