= Beki Smith =

Australian racewalker

Beki Smith (nee Lee)
Personal information
- Nickname(s): Babsie, Beki
- Nationality: Australian
- Born: Rebecca Lee; 25 November 1986 (age 38)
- Height: 1.60 m (5 ft 3 in) (2012)
- Weight: 49 kg (108 lb) (2012)

Sport
- Country: Australia
- Sport: Athletics
- Event: 20 km Road Walk
- Club: Asics West

Rebecca "Beki" Smith (née Lee, born 25 November 1986) is an Australian race walker. Lee finished fourth in the 20-kilometre walk at the 2012 Oceania & Australian Race Walking Championships and represented Australia at the 2012 Summer Olympics in the same event. She came sixth in the 2018 Commonwealth Games at the Gold Coast.

== Early life ==
Nicknamed "Babsie" and "Beki", Lee was born on 25 November 1986, in New South Wales. Lee grew up in Mount Druitt in Sydney's western suburbs and attended Minchinbury Public School and Colyton Public School, before going to high school at Rooty Hill High School and St Marys Senior High School.

Lee started race walking when she was seven years-old and became more serious about the sport when she was ten years-old. Her personal best in an international competition was tenth place in the 20-kilometre race walk at the 2011 IAAF Race Walking Challenge, hosted in Taicang, China, finishing with a time of "1:35.35".

== Tertiary education ==
For her tertiary studies, Lee attended the Australian College of Physical Education, where she commenced a Bachelor of Sports Business in 2007. As of 2012, she is enrolled in the degree via correspondence, while living in Canberra, Australia.

== Athletics ==
Lee's specialty is the 20-kilometre road walk event, with a pre-race ritual that includes listening to Bob Dylan.

A member of the Asics West athletics club, Lee holds a scholarship with the Australian Institute of Sport. Between 2003 and 2010, she was coached by Kevin Stone, then Marilyn Pearson, with Brent Vallance then taking over coaching duties, a job he holds as of 2012.

Lee was selected to represent Australia at the 2012 Summer Olympics in the 20 km walk event. At the conclusion of the race she made headlines when her now husband, Daniel Smith, publicly proposed to her.

=== Placements ===
- Tenth in the 20-kilometre walk at the 2011 IAAF Race Walking Challenge in Taicang, China
- Tenth in the 2011 World University Games in Shenzhen, China
- Second in the 20-kilometre walk at the 2011 Australian Race Walking Championships in Melbourne, Australia
- Did not finish in the 20-kilometre walk at the 2012 IAAF World Race Walking Challenge in Taicang, China
- Fourth in the 20-kilometre walk at the 2012 Oceania & Australian Race Walking Championships in Hobart, Australia
- Disqualified from the 20-kilometre walk at the 2012 IAAF World Race Walking Cup in Saransk, Russia

She is recognised in the Australian Olympic Committee list of Australian Indigenous Olympians.
