= Regan Lamble =

Australian race walker

Personal information
- Nationality: Australian
- Born: 14 October 1991 (age 34) Melbourne, Victoria, Australia
- Height: 1.74 m (5 ft 8 1/2 in) (2012)
- Weight: 55 kg (121 lb) (2012)

Sport
- Country: Australia
- Sport: Athletics
- Event: 20km Road Walk

Regan Danae Lamble (born 14 October 1991) is an Australian athlete. She was selected to represent Australia at the 2012 Summer Olympics and the 2016 Summer Olympics in the 20 km Road Walk race.

== Personal ==
Lamble was born on 14 October 1991 in Melbourne in the suburb of Box Hill. She grew up in the Melbourne suburb of Blackburn and attended Laburnum Primary School, then went to high school at Strathcona Girls Grammar, where she was a school captain in her final year. She moved to Canberra in 2009 after she finished high school. She started a Bachelor of Graphic Design degree at the University of Canberra in 2011. She has also studied art history at the Australian National University and is currently completing post-graduate studies at the University of Melbourne. She was the Eurosport commentator for the men's 50 km walk at the 2011 IAAF World Championships. As of 2012, she currently lives in Canberra, Australian Capital Territory.

Lamble is 174 centimetres (69 in) tall and weighs 55 kilograms (121 lb).

== Athletics ==
Lamble competes in the 20 km Road Walk event.

Lamble competes in club competitions for Melbourne University Athletics Club. She has an athletics scholarship with the Australian Institute of Sport, earning a scholarship in 2009. While training at the Australian Institute of Sport, her training partners include Jared Tallent and Nathan Deakes. She is coached by Brent Vallance. She has also been coached by Simon Baker, and Dave Blackwood.

Lamble competed at the 2010 World Junior Athletics Championships in Moncton, Canada, where she finished in seventh place. In April 2011, she competed in Taicang, China, where she set her first Olympic A Qualifying time in the 20 km Road Walk event. At the 2011 World Athletics Championships in Daegu, South Korea, Lamble finished 15th in the 20 km Road Walk event with a time of 1:33.38 in her Australian national team debut race.

Lamble came 16th at the 2012 Summer Olympics in the 20 km Road Walk event and came 9th at the 2016 Summer Olympics in the same event.
